= Thames Silents =

Series of re-released silent films

Thames Silents is a series of releases (theatrical, broadcast and home video) of films from the silent era produced by the British ITV contractor Thames Television. Kevin Brownlow and David Gill were the two main people involved in the project.

The collaboration between Brownlow and Gill had begun with the Thames documentary series Hollywood (1980), a thirteen part exploration of the silent era. It was an enormous success, and generated a degree of renewed interest in silent cinema. Subsequently, Thames screened the team's two subsequent television series, Unknown Chaplin and Buster Keaton: A Hard Act to Follow, plus the two part Harold Lloyd: The Third Genius examining silent comedy.

In conjunction with several US organisations, the Thames Silents project restored full-length silent films, often released for limited cinema screenings. These began with Abel Gance's Napoléon (1927) in 1980, a French epic for which Brownlow has a special affection. Later examples include Chaplin, Keaton and Lloyd comedies, and films by other significant figures from the period such as Douglas Fairbanks, Rudolph Valentino, Erich von Stroheim, Rex Ingram, and D.W. Griffith. Napoleon was one of Channel Four's earliest broadcasts, and many of the films were released on home video. The composer Carl Davis was commissioned to write new scores for almost all of the releases.

Thames Silents continued, via Brownlow's Photoplay Productions, since 1990; Thames Television lost its ITV franchise in December 1992. It is no longer used as an imprint by FremantleMedia, the ultimate owners of Thames.
