= Buster Keaton: A Hard Act to Follow =

1987 3-part television documentary series

Buster Keaton: A Hard Act to Follow is a three-part television documentary series made in 1987, charting the life and career of Buster Keaton. The series was written and produced by Kevin Brownlow and David Gill for Thames Television and narrated by Lindsay Anderson. It was one of three such series produced as follow-ups to Brownlow and Gill's epic documentary series Hollywood (1980), falling between Unknown Chaplin (1983) and Harold Lloyd: The Third Genius (1989).

The series makes extensive use of Keaton's own words, taken from various radio and television interviews. Clips from Keaton's movies are taken from the best available sources (though without the benefit of modern digital remastering techniques), and clips from Keaton's silent films are shown at their original speed. Keaton's widow Eleanor and his business associate Raymond Rohauer worked closely with Brownlow and Gill in the production, and appear in the documentary.

PBS aired the film in the U.S. as part of its American Masters series in 1987, and it has more recently been aired on Turner Classic Movies. It is currently available on DVD in the United Kingdom, as a companion to the Buster Keaton Chronicles movie box set.
