= Cinema Europe: The Other Hollywood =

Documentary film series

Cinema Europe: The Other Hollywood (1995) is a documentary film series produced by David Gill and silent film historian Kevin Brownlow. It is a follow-up to their 1980 documentary film series, Hollywood.

== Overview ==
The six-part mini-series focuses on the origin of European cinema, from its infancy as a novelty created by French inventors Auguste and Louis Lumière to its flourishing as the pinnacle of film-making in the silent era and as a serious commercial contender against America (that is, until the surge of the Nazis). The important series contains much rare footage and offers an even-handed analysis of the specific strengths and weaknesses of the various national film industries during this first flourishing of film as art.

The documentary is narrated by filmmaker and actor Kenneth Branagh. Original music in the film was composed by Carl Davis, Philip Appleby & Nic Raine.

The series originally aired on the BBC in 1995, and on Turner Classic Movies in the US in 1996. In 2000, Image Entertainment released the whole series on a 2-disc DVD (3 episodes on each disc) totaling 348 minutes.

The documentary was shown from time to time on public television stations, usually at late night slots, due to its length and occasional sexual frankness.

== Episodes ==
The documentary is divided into the following episodes (with original BBC airdates):

- "Where It All Began" (Introductory Episode)

October 1, 1995
Highlighting the world's first public presentation of films in Paris, the silent film industries in Denmark and Italy, the comedies by Max Linder and Ernst Lubitsch, Abel Gance's J'accuse and the onset of World War I.

- "Art's Promised Land" (Sweden)

October 8, 1995
Including Ingeborg Holm, Terje Vigen and The Phantom Carriage by Victor Sjöström and Greta Garbo's star-making performance opposite Lars Hanson in Mauritz Stiller's Gosta Berling's Saga. Directed by Michael Winterbottom.

- "The Unchained Camera" (Germany)

October 15, 1995
Featuring The Cabinet of Dr. Caligari, Battleship Potemkin by Sergei Eisenstein, Metropolis, Die Nibelungen by Fritz Lang, Joyless Street starring Greta Garbo, F. W. Murnau's Nosferatu, Emil Jannings, The White Hell of Pitz Palu featuring Leni Riefenstahl and Louise Brooks becomes a star in G. W. Pabst's Pandora's Box and Diary of a Lost Girl.

- "The Music of Light" (France)

October 22, 1995
Highlighting Abel Gance's masterpieces, Napoleon and La Roue.

- "Opportunity Lost" (Britain)

October 29, 1995
Exploring the early career of Alfred Hitchcock.

- "End of an Era" (Finale)

November 5, 1995
Focusing on the arrival of sound films, The Jazz Singer, The Blue Angel, and the onslaught of World War II.
