= Patrick Stanbury =

British film producer, restorer and historian

Patrick Stanbury is a British film producer, restorer and historian.

== Photoplay productions ==
In 1990, together with Kevin Brownlow and David Gill, Stanbury established Photoplay Productions. He served as Associate Producer on all Photoplay's early work. When Gill died in 1997, Stanbury and Brownlow continued programme-making together, with Stanbury assuming responsibility for producing, as well as taking over Gill's role in charge of video and music preparation for the feature restorations.

== Selected filmography ==
- I'm King Kong!: The Exploits of Merian C. Cooper (2005)
- Garbo (2005)
- About Unknown Chaplin (2005)
- So Funny It Hurt: Buster Keaton & MGM (2004)
- Cecil B. DeMille: American Epic (2004)
- The Tramp and the Dictator (2002)
- Lon Chaney: A Thousand Faces (2000)
