= Harvey Parry =

American actor

- Born: April 23, 1900
- Died: September 18, 1985 (aged 85)

Harvey Parry (April 23, 1900 – September 18, 1985) was an American stuntman and actor whose career spanned the silent era and the disaster movie genre of the 1970s.

Born on April 23, 1900, in San Francisco, California, Parry had been an Association of American Universities boxing and diving champion, and had a spell in a circus as an acrobat. His first film job was as a property man at the studios, before realising that his skills made him ideally suited to perform stunts, an increasingly in-demand feature of early cinema.

He first worked for Mack Sennett in 1919, before doubling for Harold Lloyd in one of his early 'thrill' pictures, Never Weaken (1921). Parry performed the reverse shots before an oncoming locomotive for Monty Banks’ racing-car-to-train transfer in Play Safe (1927).

He worked for Lloyd again in perhaps Lloyd's most famous picture, Safety Last! (1923), which featured a climb up a skyscraper as its climax. In particular, Parry was used for the long shots of the building, which would have been too dangerous for a star of Lloyd's stature to perform. Parry did not disclose his work on this film until after Lloyd's death in 1971.

In a long career of more than 60 years, Parry doubled for stars including Humphrey Bogart, Peter Lorre, George Raft and even Mary Pickford, as his 5'6" frame made him ideally suited to substitute for women.

Parry also made many acting appearances, often in bit parts; however, he did have a semi-regular role in the 1970 crime series Baretta. He also appeared in an acting role as the referee in the Martin Scorsese film Raging Bull (1980). His final film as a stuntman was in the Blake Edwards comedy A Fine Mess (1986). The film was released shortly after Parry's death in September 1985. His personal papers, including correspondence with the Stuntmen's Association, are held in the archive of the Academy of Motion Picture Arts and Sciences.

Harvey Parry was one of the interviewees for the award-winning Thames Television series Hollywood, in which he spoke at length about how many of the stunts were achieved, often with minimal safety precautions and low pay. He closed the episode on stunt performers with this reminiscence:

It was a different day. I wish I could really explain... I wish I could really give what's in here out to you there, the greatness of the old days. They made good pictures too... with a boxed lunch, a two-dollar bill and a roll of film. That's what it was. But it was great.
