= David Lean bibliography =

A list of books and essays about David Lean:

- Brownlow, Kevin (15 August 1996). David Lean: A Biography. St. Martin's Press. ISBN 978-1-4668-3237-4.
- Lean, David (2009). David Lean: Interviews. Univ. Press of Mississippi. ISBN 978-1-60473-235-1.
- Phillips, Gene (24 November 2006). Beyond the Epic: The Life and Films of David Lean. University Press of Kentucky. ISBN 0-8131-7155-5.
- Santas, Constantine (22 September 2011). The Epic Films of David Lean. Scarecrow Press. ISBN 978-0-8108-8211-9.
- Silverman, Stephen M. (1992). David Lean. Abrams. ISBN 978-0-8109-2507-6.
