= Photoplay Productions =

British independent film company

Photoplay Productions is an independent film company, based in the UK, under the direction of Kevin Brownlow and Patrick Stanbury. It is one of the few independent companies to operate in the revival of interest in silent cinema and has been recognised as a driving force in the subject.

In 2010, Photoplay Productions was the recipient of the Silent Film Festival Award

== Documentary production ==
Photoplay Productions has been recognised as a driving force in the revival of interest in silent cinema.

Amongst its film history documentaries are:

- D. W. Griffith: Father of Film, produced by Kevin Brownlow, David Gill and Patrick Stanbury. Narrated by Sam Wanamaker.
- I'm King Kong! - The Exploits of Merian C Cooper (2005) directed by Kevin Brownlow and Christopher Bird. Narrated by Alec Baldwin
- Garbo (2005) directed by Kevin Brownlow and Christopher Bird. Narrated by Julie Christie
- Cinema Europe: The Other Hollywood (1995) directed by Kevin Brownlow and David Gill. Narrated by Kenneth Branagh
- Universal Horror (1998) directed by Kevin Brownlow. Narrated by Kenneth Branagh
- The Tramp and the Dictator (2002) directed by Kevin Brownlow and Michael Kloft. Narrated by Kenneth Branagh
- Cecil B. DeMille - American Epic (2003) directed by Kevin Brownlow directed by Kevin Brownlow. Narrated by Kenneth Branagh
- Lon Chaney - A Thousand Faces (2000) directed by Kevin Brownlow Narrated by Kenneth Branagh
- So Funny It Hurt – Buster Keaton And MGM (2004) directed by Kevin Brownlow and Christopher Bird. Narrated by James Karen
- Abel Gance – The Charm of Dynamite (1968) directed by Kevin Brownlow. Narrated by Lindsay Anderson

== Film restoration ==
Photoplay Productions has restored numerous feature silent films and shorts, with music by Carl Davis including the following titles:

=== Features ===
- Napoleon (1927) directed by Abel Gance starring Albert Dieudonné
- The Birth of a Nation (1915) directed by D. W. Griffith starring Lillian Gish and Henry B Walthall
- Greed (1924) directed by Eric Von Stroheim with ZaSu Pitts and Gibson Gowland
- Nosferatu (1922) directed by F. W. Murnau starring Max Schreck
- It (1927) directed by Clarence Badger starring Clara Bow
- Old Heidelberg (1927) directed by Ernst Lubitsch starring Ramon Novarro and Norma Shearer
- Sunrise: A Song of Two Humans (1927) directed by F. W. Murnau starring Janet Gaynor and George O'Brien
- Flesh and the Devil (1926) directed by Clarence Brown starring Greta Garbo and John Gilbert
- The Mysterious Lady (1928) directed by Fred Niblo starring Greta Garbo and Conrad Nagel
- A Woman of Affairs (1928) directed by Clarence Brown starring Greta Garbo and John Gilbert
- The Blot (1921) directed by Lois Weber starring Claire Windsor and Louis Calhern
- The Crowd (1928) directed by King Vidor starring Eleanor Boardman and James Murray
- La Terre (1919) directed by André Antoine starring Germaine Rouer and Armand Bour
- The Yellow Ticket (1918) directed by Victor Jansen starring Pola Negri
- The Godless Girl (1928) directed by Cecil B. DeMille
- The Wind (1928) directed by Victor Seastrom with Lillian Gish and Lars Hanson
- The Wedding March (1928) directed by and starring Erich von Stroheim with Fay Wray
- The Iron Mask (1929) directed by Allan Dwan starring Douglas Fairbanks
- The Thief of Bagdad (1924) directed by Raoul Walsh starring Douglas Fairbanks
- The Eagle (1925) directed by Clarence Brown starring Rudolph Valentino and Vilma Banky
- The Four Horsemen of the Apocalypse (1921) directed by Rex Ingram starring Rudolph Valentino
- The Big Parade (1925) directed by King Vidor starring John Gilbert and Renee Adoree
- Wings (1927) directed by William Wellman starring Clara Bow, Richard Arlen and Charles "Buddy" Rogers
- The Chess Player (1926) directed by Raymond Bernard starring Pierre Blanchar and Edith Jehanne
- Orphans of the Storm (1921) directed by D. W. Griffith starring Lillian and Dorothy Gish
- Show People (1928) directed by King Vidor starring Marion Davies and William Haines
- The Iron Horse (1924) directed by John Ford starring George O 'Brien and Madge Bellamy
- The Extra Girl (1923) directed by F. Richard Jones starring Mabel Normand
- Ben-Hur – A Tale of the Christ (1925) directed by Fred Niblo starring Ramon Novarro
- The Cat and the Canary (1927) directed by Paul Leni
- The General (1926) co-directed by and starring Buster Keaton
- Our Hospitality (1923) co-directed by and starring Buster Keaton
- Speedy (1928) directed by Ted Wilde starring Harold Lloyd
- The Kid Brother (1927) directed by Ted Wilde starring Harold Lloyd
- Safety Last! (1923) directed by Fred C. Newmeyer and Sam Taylor starring Harold Lloyd
- Girl Shy (1924) directed by Fred C. Newmeyer and Sam Taylor starring Harold Lloyd
- Hot Water (1924) directed by Fred C. Newmeyer starring Harold Lloyd
- The Phantom of the Opera (1925) directed by Rupert Julian starring Lon Chaney
- The Hunchback of Notre Dame (1923) directed by Wallace Worsley with Lon Chaney
- Heart o' the Hills (1919) directed by Sidney Franklin starring Mary Pickford and John Gilbert
- Mare Nostrum (1926) directed by Rex Ingram starring Alice Terry and Antonio Moreno
- The Wicked Darling (1919) directed by Tod Browning with Lon Chaney and Priscilla Dean
- The Strong Man (1927) directed by Frank Capra starring Harry Langdon
- Broken Blossoms (1919) directed by D. W. Griffith starring Lillian Gish and Richard Barthelmess
- Intolerance (1916) directed by D. W. Griffith starring Lillian Gish, Robert Harron and Constance Talmadge

=== Shorts ===
- The Adventures of Dollie (1908) directed by D. W. Griffith starring Lillian and Dorothy Gish
- The Immigrant (1917) directed by and starring Charles Chaplin
- One Week (1920) co-directed by and starring Buster Keaton
- Get Out and Get Under (1920) directed by Hal Roach with Harold Lloyd
- Giving Them Fits (1915) directed by Hal Roach starring Harold Lloyd
- Sword Points (1928) directed by Mark Sandrich starring Lupino Lane

=== Academy recognition ===
In 2010 Photoplay Director Kevin Brownlow was awarded an honorary Oscar for his services to cinema in the role of film historian and film restorer.
