= Raymond Rohauer =

American film collector and distributor

Rohauer, c. 1968

Raymond Rohauer (c. 1924 – November 10, 1987) was an American film collector and distributor. Rohauer first started his career by curating films at the Coronet Theatre. In the 1950s, he came to prominence as a distributor and reissuer of Buster Keaton movies which he partnered with Keaton for. Rohauer would later acquire various films, such as silent films, which expanded into a film library better known as the Rohauer Library. Rohauer often used tactics to secure the distribution of these films, protect his library by exhibiting low-quality copies of such, and licensing them, which were often contested by his contemporaries and the subject of his controversy. He died on November 10, 1987, with his film library estimated to have 700 titles. Since then, his library has been integrated into the Cohen Film Collection.

== Early life and career ==
Raymond Rohauer was born in 1924 and raised in Buffalo, New York. He moved to California in 1942 and was educated at Los Angeles City College. Rohauer made a five-reel 16mm experimental film Whirlpool (1947), which was not successful. He subsequently became active in film exhibition at the Coronet Theatre from 1950, which was, according to William K. Everson, a "bizarre combination of art house, film society, and exploitation cinema". Films shown at the Coronet were generally copied illicitly, occasionally to the irritation of the Museum of Modern Art (MoMA) in New York City because Rohauer often neglected to remove identifying features present in their prints.

In 1954, Rohauer met Buster Keaton and his wife, Eleanor. The Coronet Theatre was showing The General, which "Buster hadn't seen ... in years and he wanted me to see it," Eleanor Keaton said in 1987. "Raymond recognized Buster and their friendship started." Rohauer in that same article recalls: "I was in the projection room. I got a ring that Buster Keaton was in the lobby. I go down and there he is with Eleanor. The next day I met with him at his home. I didn't realize we were going to join forces. But I realized he had this I-don't-care attitude about his stuff. He said, 'It's valueless. I don't own the rights.'" Keaton had prints of the features Three Ages, Sherlock Jr., Steamboat Bill, Jr., College (missing one reel) and the shorts The Boat and My Wife's Relations, which Keaton and Rohauer had transferred to safety stock from deteriorating nitrate film stock. Other prints of Keaton's films had been found at the Italian Villa, Keaton's palatial estate of the 1920s now owned by actor James Mason. Mason decided to donate the films to the Academy of Motion Picture Arts and Sciences in January 1956: "I knew that Keaton could not use the films to his personal advantage and that he did not command the facilities for preserving them. Anyway, right or wrong, I chose the Academy." Rohauer, undaunted, created the new legal entity Buster Keaton Productions, with himself and Mr. and Mrs. Keaton as executive officers. This entity gave Rohauer legal access to the Keaton titles held by the Academy.

Raymond Rohauer was known for claiming rights to films under dubious pretexts; he pursued court battles over The Birth of a Nation, eventually found to be in the public domain, and other classics. He made new prints of director Leni Riefenstahl's 1938 documentary Olympia, only to find that Riefenstahl was still alive and determined to assert her rights as the true owner. Rohauer and Riefenstahl ultimately agreed on a settlement. Often, Rohauer would re-edit films or insert new intertitles, so he could claim copyright on these new editions and charge a licensing fee.

== Later career ==
By the early 1960s, Rohauer was known within the motion picture industry as a leading source for silent films. Television producer Jay Ward licensed Rohauer's silent footage for his satirical Fractured Flickers series.

During the 1960s, Rohauer returned to the East Coast and became the film curator of the Huntington Hartford Gallery of Modern Art in New York City, although the gallery's existence was relatively brief. In some cases, he acquired the rights to stories from the estates of deceased writers, so gaining a hold over The Sheik (1921), produced by Paramount and starring Rudolph Valentino. Alternatively, he found instances where living writers no longer held the rights to their work, an example being the J.B. Priestley novel Benighted, which was the basis for The Old Dark House (1932), James Whale's Universal horror film that had been thought lost. According to William K. Everson, he would claim to overseas contacts that he had won libel suits which he had, in fact, lost or accept bookings for silent films which no longer existed.

The biggest markets for the "Rohauer Collection", as it came to be merchandised, were revival theaters and colleges. Rohauer, offering the Buster Keaton silent films and Mack Sennett comedies (which he also claimed to own), deliberately distributed third-rate copies featuring harsh contrast and washed-out details. These prints were just clear enough to be shown to audiences, but not good enough to be copied any further.

Rohauer was involved in the preservation of outtakes from the films of Charlie Chaplin, which were saved after the filmmaker was forced to leave the United States in 1952. This material formed the basis of the Unknown Chaplin series in 1983. Such was Rohauer's reputation in this field that Kevin Brownlow, the co-producer of this series and the earlier Hollywood (1980), had not previously allowed his production staff to use Rohauer's resources. Brownlow considered him a "pirate", while William K. Everson preferred the term "freebooter", as it implied the "certain cavalier charm that Rohauer possessed".

== Death and legacy ==
At the time, Rohauer was reported to have died at the St. Luke's–Roosevelt Hospital Center in Manhattan, New York City from complications following a heart attack on November 10, 1987. Later sources say he died from AIDS.

The 700 titles amassed by Rohauer passed to the Douris Corporation in 1996. Douris licensed the Keaton films to the American Movie Classics cable-television network. For the first time in decades, original film materials were consulted, resulting in superior, first-generation video masters for a nationwide, marathon broadcast -- a loss of control unthinkable to Rohauer during his lifetime. The Rohauer library was acquired by Cohen Film Collection in 2011. Cohen has since issued four volumes of Keaton films on home video.
