= Carl Davis =

US–UK conductor and composer (1936–2023)

Carl Davis CBE
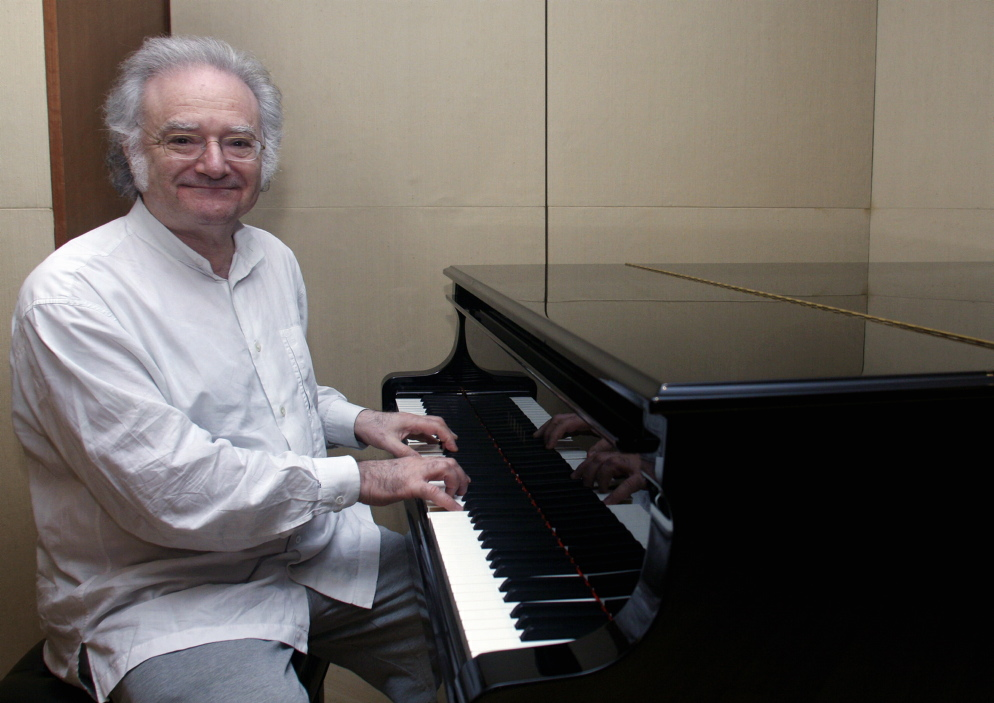
- Davis in 2009
- Born: October 28, 1936; New York City, US
- Died: August 3, 2023 (aged 86); Oxford, England
- Education: Bard College
- Occupations: Conductor and composer
- Years active: 1960–2023
- Spouse: Jean Boht (m. 1970)
- Children: 2
- Website: carldaviscollection.com

Carl Davis (October 28, 1936 – August 3, 2023) was an American-born British conductor and composer. He wrote music for more than 100 television programmes, notably the landmark ITV series The World at War (1973) and BBC's Pride and Prejudice (1995), and he created new scores for concert and cinema performances of vintage silent movies and composed many film, ballet and concert scores that were performed worldwide, including the Liverpool Oratorio in 1991, in collaboration with Paul McCartney. Davis's publisher was Faber Music.

== Early life and career ==
Carl Davis was born in Brooklyn, New York, on October 28, 1936, to Jewish parents, Sara (née Perlmutter) and Isadore Davis. He studied composition with Paul Nordoff and Hugo Kauder, and subsequently with Per Nørgard in Copenhagen. He attended Bard College, in Annandale-on-Hudson, New York. His early work in the US provided valuable conducting experience with organisations such as the New York City Opera and the Robert Shaw Chorale. In 1959, the revue Diversions, of which he was co-author, won an off-Broadway award and subsequently travelled to the Edinburgh Festival in 1961. As a direct result of its success there, Davis was commissioned by Ned Sherrin to compose music for the original British version of That Was the Week That Was. Other radio and TV commissions followed and Davis's UK career was launched.

== Television ==
Davis achieved early prominence with the title music for the BBC's anthology play series The Wednesday Play and later for Play for Today. For the critically acclaimed and popular success Pride and Prejudice (1995) Davis used period classical music as his inspiration, in particular Beethoven's Septet E flat major, Op. 20 and a theme strongly reminiscent of the finale of his Emperor Concerto.

Davis' television scores included The Naked Civil Servant (1975), Shades of Greene (1975), The Kiss of Death (1977), Langrishe, Go Down (1978), Prince Regent (1979), Private Schulz (1980), Oppenheimer (1980), Winston Churchill: The Wilderness Years (1981), The Hound of the Baskervilles (1982), The Far Pavilions (1984), The Day the Universe Changed (1985), The Pickwick Papers (1985), Hotel du Lac (1986), Ashenden (1991), Anne Frank Remembered (1995), Seesaw (1998), Coming Home (1998), Upstairs Downstairs (2010), and Brexicuted (2018).

Davis also worked for television producer Jeremy Isaacs in providing the original music for the documentary history series The World at War (1973) for Thames Television, and later Cold War (1998) for the BBC. He conducted the BBC's theme song for its coverage of the 2006 FIFA World Cup, adapted from George Frideric Handel's "See the Conquering Hero Comes".

== Silent film music ==
In the late 1970s, Davis was commissioned by documentarians Kevin Brownlow and David Gill to create music for Thames Television's Hollywood: A Celebration of the American Silent Film (1980). His association with them continued the same year with the restoration of Abel Gance's 1927 epic silent film Napoléon, for which Davis' music – drawing once again on Beethoven as a source – was used in its cinematic re-release and television screenings. There was a similar treatment for D. W. Griffith's Intolerance: Love's Struggle Through The Ages (1916). This had orchestral music originally, but Davis's new score was used instead in 1989. In March 2012 Davis conducted the Oakland East Bay Symphony, performing his score live during a presentation of Napoleon in the complete Brownlow restoration at the San Francisco Silent Film Festival in Oakland.

The Hollywood documentary series was followed by the documentaries Unknown Chaplin (1983), Buster Keaton: A Hard Act to Follow (1987) and Harold Lloyd: The Third Genius (1989). In the 1980s and 1990s, Davis wrote and conducted the scores for numerous Thames Silents releases and television screenings.

By 1993, his reputation made him the number one choice for new scores to silent films. Many DVD releases, including Ben-Hur (1925), The Phantom of the Opera (1925), Safety Last (1923), DeMille's The Godless Girl (1928), Chaplin's City Lights (1931, re-orchestrated by Davis based on Chaplin's and José Padilla's original written score), and Erich von Stroheim's Greed (1924), use Davis's music. Davis also entirely re-scored Clarence Brown's Flesh and the Devil (1927). On several occasions he conducted these scores live in the cinema or concert hall as the film was being screened.

== Film music ==
Davis also composed for contemporary films, including the BAFTA and Ivor Novello award winning score for The French Lieutenant's Woman in 1981. His other films included The Bofors Gun (1968), The Only Way (1970), I, Monster (1971), Up Pompeii (1971), Up the Chastity Belt (1971), Rentadick (1972), What Became of Jack and Jill? (1972), Catholics (1973), Man Friday (1975), The Sailor's Return (1978), Champions (1983), King David (1985), The Girl in a Swing (1988), Scandal (1989), The Rainbow (1989), Frankenstein Unbound (1990), The Trial (1993), Widows' Peak (1994), The Great Gatsby (2000), Mothers & Daughters (2004) and The Understudy (2008).

== Stage and concert works ==
Although Carl Davis wrote several substantial orchestral and concertante pieces – including the symphonic A Circle of Stones for full orchestra in 1997 – the core of his work outside of film and television was drama and dance, particularly musicals and ballet. He continued to actively compose over the last decade of his life, during which he produced four large scale dance works: Nijinsky (2016) and Chaplin, the Tramp (2019), both for the Slovak National Ballet in Bratislava; The Great Gatsby for the Pittsburgh Ballet Theatre (2019); and most recently the two-act Le Fantôme et Christine, from Gaston Leroux's 1911 novel, which develops themes he first composed for the 1925 silent movie Phantom of the Opera. This received its premiere by the Shanghai Ballet on May 11, 2023. Other works include:

- Alice in Wonderland is a musical adaptation of Lewis Carroll's novel Alice's Adventures in Wonderland, with additional lyrics by John Wells. The first performance took place on 13 December 1986 at The Lyric Theatre in London by the London Lyric Company, directed by Stuart Hutchinson. On December 12 1977, a radio adaptation of the musical with Polly James as Alice premiered on BBC Radio 4.
- Aladdin, commissioned by Scottish Ballet in 2000 for the Edinburgh Festival Theatre, is a three act ballet with choreography by Robert Cohan.
- A Christmas Carol, a ballet in three acts written in 1992, having been commissioned by Scottish Ballet. Choreography by Massimo Moricone.
- A Circle of Stones, four symphonic pictures for orchestra, was written for broadcast on S4C in 1997.
- The Clarinet Concerto was commissioned by the Greenwich Festival in 1984, where it was performed by the English Chamber Orchestra with soloist David Campbell.
- Cyrano, a Birmingham Royal Ballet commission, was premiered at the Liverpool Philharmonic Hall, (one excerpt), by the Royal Liverpool Philharmonic Orchestra conducted by the composer in 2006.
- The Fantasy for Flute, Strings and Harpsichord was first performed at the Chichester Music Festival in 1985 by the Academy of St Martin in the Fields, soloist Susan Milan.
- The Lady of the Camellias – La Dame Aux Camelias is a ballet in two acts and was first performed at the Croatian National Theatre, Zagreb by the Croatian National Theatre Ballet in 2008.
- The Last Train to Tomorrow for children's choir, actors and orchestra, based on the wartime Kindertransport rescue effort of children from Nazi-controlled territory, was premiered by the Hallé Orchestra and Children's Choir in 2012.
- Lipizzaner is a ballet for chamber orchestra commissioned by Northern Ballet Theatre. It premiered in November 1989 at the Manchester Palace.
- The Liverpool Oratorio. In 1991, Davis and Paul McCartney collaborated on an eight-movement choral work, recorded to commemorate the 150th anniversary of the Royal Liverpool Philharmonic. Loosely based on McCartney's own life, the Liverpool Oratorio was jointly composed by Davis and McCartney and conducted by Davis.
- The Mermaid is a musical set to text by Hiawyn Oram, based on the fairy tale by Hans Christian Andersen. Composed in 2003, it received its debut performance at Fairfield Preparatory School: Loughborough Endowed Schools in 2011.

== Personal life and death ==
Davis married the British actress Jean Boht on December 28, 1970. They had two daughters, filmmakers Hannah Louise (born 1972) and Jessie Jo (born 1974). Davis also composed music for his daughter Hannah's films Mothers & Daughters (2004) and The Understudy (2008). Davis and his wife were executive producers on the latter, and they appeared in the film as a married couple, the Davidovitches.

Davis died from a brain haemorrhage in Oxford on August 3, 2023, aged 86. His wife Jean Boht died a month later on September 12, 2023, aged 91, having suffered from vascular dementia and Alzheimer's disease.
