= Napoléon (1927 film) =

1927 film by Abel Gance

- Poster for smaller format rural France release, ca. 1928
- Directed by: Abel Gance
- Written by: Abel Gance
- Produced by: Abel Gance
- Starring: Albert Dieudonné; Gina Manès; Antonin Artaud; Edmond Van Daële
- Cinematography: Jules Kruger
- Edited by: Marguerite Beaugé (1927)
- Music by: Arthur Honegger (France); Werner Heymann (Germany)
- Distributed by: Pathé-Nathan
- Release date: 7 April 1927
- Running time: 562 minutes (see below)
- Country: France
- Language: Silent film with intertitles
- Box office: $2.5 million (1981 reissue)

Napoléon (on-screen title: Napoléon vu par Abel Gance, "Napoleon as seen by Abel Gance") is a 1927 French silent epic historical film, produced and directed by Abel Gance, that tells the story of Napoleon's early years.

The only film to use Polyvision (for the finale), it is recognised as a masterwork of fluid camera motion, produced in a time when most camera shots were static. Many innovative techniques were used to make the film, including fast cutting, extensive close-ups, a wide variety of hand-held camera shots, location shooting, point of view shots, multiple-camera setups, multiple exposure, superimposition, underwater camera, kaleidoscopic images, film tinting, split screen and mosaic shots, multi-screen projection, and other visual effects. A revival of Napoléon in the mid-1950s influenced the filmmakers of the French New Wave. The film used the Keller-Dorian cinematography for its color sequences.

The film begins in Brienne-le-Château with youthful Napoleon attending military school where he manages a snowball fight like a military campaign, yet he suffers the insults of other boys. It continues a decade later with scenes of the French Revolution and Napoleon's presence at the periphery as a young army lieutenant. He returns to visit his family home in Corsica but politics shift against him and put him in mortal danger. He flees, taking his family to France. Serving as an officer of artillery in the Siege of Toulon, Napoleon's genius for leadership is rewarded with a promotion to brigadier general. Jealous revolutionaries imprison Napoleon but then the political tide turns against the Revolution's own leaders. Napoleon leaves prison, forming plans to invade Italy. He falls in love with the beautiful Joséphine de Beauharnais. The emergency government charges him with the task of protecting the National Assembly. Succeeding in this he is promoted to Commander-in-Chief of the Army of the Interior, and he marries Joséphine. He takes control of the army which protects the French–Italian border and propels it to victory in an invasion of Italy.

Gance planned for Napoléon to be the first of six films about Napoleon's career, a chronology of great triumph and defeat ending in Napoleon's death in exile on the island of Saint Helena. After the difficulties encountered in making the first film, Gance realised that the costs involved would make the full project impossible.

Napoléon was first released in a gala at the Palais Garnier (then the home of the Paris Opera) on 7 April 1927. The film had been screened in only eight European cities when Metro-Goldwyn-Mayer bought the rights to it, but after screening it in London, it was cut drastically in length, and only the central panel of the three-screen Polyvision sequences was retained before it received a limited release in the United States. There, the film was indifferently received at a time when talkies were just starting to appear. The film was restored in 1980 after twenty years' work by silent film historian Kevin Brownlow, with further restoration done under his supervision in 2016. A new restoration of the film, supervised by Georges Mourier, premiered in France in July 2024.

== Plot ==
Napoléon, as reconstructed by Kevin Brownlow

The scenario of the film as originally written by Gance was published in 1927 by Librairie Plon. Much of the scenario describes scenes that were rejected during initial editing, and do not appear in any known version of the film. The following plot includes only those scenes that are known to have been included in some version of the film. Not every scene described below can be viewed today.

=== Act I ===
==== Brienne ====
In the winter of 1783, young Napoleon Buonaparte (Vladimir Roudenko) is enrolled at Brienne College, a military school for sons of nobility, run by the religious Minim Fathers in Brienne-le-Château, France. The boys at the school are holding a snowball fight organised as a battlefield. Two bullies—Phélippeaux (Petit Vidal) and Peccaduc (Roblin)—schoolyard antagonists of Napoleon, are leading the larger side, outnumbering the side that Napoleon fights for. These two sneak up on Napoleon with snowballs enclosing stones. A hardened snowball draws blood on Napoleon's face. Napoleon is warned of another rock-snowball by a shout from Tristan Fleuri (Nicolas Koline), the fictional school scullion representing the French everyman and a friend to Napoleon. Napoleon recovers himself and dashes alone to the enemy snowbank to engage the two bullies in close combat. The Minim Fathers, watching the snowball fight from windows and doorways, applaud the action. Napoleon returns to his troops and encourages them to attack ferociously. He watches keenly and calmly as this attack progresses, assessing the balance of the struggle and giving appropriate orders. He smiles as his troops turn the tide of battle. Carrying his side's flag, he leads his forces in a final charge and raises the flag at the enemy stronghold.

The monks come out of the school buildings to discover who led the victory. A young military instructor, Jean-Charles Pichegru (René Jeanne), asks Napoleon for his name. Napoleon responds "Nap-eye-ony" in Corsican-accented French and is laughed at by the others. Despite the fact Pichegru thought Napoleon had said "Paille-au-nez" (straw in the nose), Pichegru tells him that he will go far.

In class, the boys study geography. Napoleon is angered by the condescending textbook description of Corsica. He is taunted by the other boys and kicked by the two bullies who hold flanking seats. Another of the class's island examples is Saint Helena, which puts Napoleon into a pensive daydream.

Unhappy in school, Napoleon writes about his difficulties in a letter to his family. A bully reports to a monk that Napoleon is hiding letters in his bed, and the monk tears the letter to pieces. Angry, Napoleon goes to visit the attic quarters of his friend Fleuri, a place of refuge where Napoleon keeps his captive bird, a young eagle that was sent to him from Corsica by an uncle. Napoleon tenderly pets the eagle's head, then leaves to fetch water for the bird. The two bullies take this opportunity to set the bird free. Napoleon finds the bird gone and runs to the dormitory to demand the culprit show himself. None of the boys admit to the deed. Napoleon exclaims that they are all guilty, and begins to fight them all, jumping from bed to bed. In the clash, pillows are split and feathers fly through the air as the Minim Fathers work to restore order. They collar Napoleon and throw him outside in the snow. Napoleon cries to himself on the limber of a cannon, then he looks up to see the young eagle in a tree. He calls to the eagle which flies down to the cannon barrel. Napoleon caresses the eagle and smiles through his tears.

==== The French Revolution ====
In 1792, the great hall of the Club of the Cordeliers is filled with revolutionary zeal as hundreds of members wait for a meeting to begin. The leaders of the group, Georges Danton (Alexandre Koubitzky), Jean-Paul Marat (Antonin Artaud) and Maximilien Robespierre (Edmond Van Daële), are seen conferring. Camille Desmoulins (Robert Vidalin), Danton's secretary, interrupts Danton to tell of a new song that has been printed, called "La Marseillaise". A young army captain, Claude Joseph Rouget de Lisle (Harry Krimer) has written the words and brought the song to the club. Danton directs de Lisle to sing the song to the club. The sheet music is distributed and the club learns to sing the song, rising in fervor with each passage. At the edge of the crowd, Napoleon (Albert Dieudonné), now a young army lieutenant, thanks de Lisle as he leaves: "Your hymn will save many a cannon."

Splashed with water in a narrow Paris street, Napoleon is noticed by Joséphine de Beauharnais (Gina Manès) and Paul Barras (Max Maxudian) as they step from a carriage on their way into the house of Mademoiselle Lenormand (Carrie Carvalho), the fortune teller. Inside, Lenormand exclaims to Joséphine that she has the amazing fortune to be the future queen.

On the night of 10 August 1792, Napoleon watches impassively as mob rule takes over Paris and a man is hung by revolutionaries. In front of the National Assembly, Danton tells the crowd that they have cracked the monarchy. Napoleon senses a purpose rising within him, to bring order to the chaos. The mob violence has tempered his character.

Napoleon, on leave from the French Army, travels to Corsica with his sister, Élisa (Yvette Dieudonné). They are greeted by his mother, Letizia Buonaparte (Eugénie Buffet) and the rest of his family at their summer home in Les Milelli. The shepherd Santo-Ricci (Henri Baudin) interrupts the happy welcome to tell Napoleon the bad news that Corsica's president, Pasquale Paoli (Maurice Schutz), is planning to give the island to the British. Napoleon declares his intention to prevent this fate.

Riding a horse and revisiting places of his childhood, Napoleon stops in Milelli gardens and considers whether to retreat and protect his family, or to advance into the political arena. Later in the streets of Ajaccio, Pozzo di Borgo (Acho Chakatouny) encourages a mob to put Napoleon to death for opposing Paoli, and the townsfolk surround the Buonaparte home. Napoleon stands outside the door and stares the crowd down, dispersing them silently. Paoli signs a death warrant, putting a price on Napoleon's head. Napoleon's brothers, Lucien (Sylvio Cavicchia) and Joseph (Georges Lampin), leave for Calvi to see if French authorities can intervene. Napoleon faces the danger alone, walking into an inn where men are arguing politics, all of whom would like to see him dead. He confronts the men and says, "Our fatherland is France ...with me!" His arguments subdue the crowd, but di Borgo enters the inn, accompanied by gendarmes. Napoleon evades capture and rides away on his horse, pursued by di Borgo and his men.

Upstairs in the Ajaccio town hall, a council declares war on France even while the French flag flies outside the window. Napoleon climbs up the balcony and takes down the flag, shouting to the council, "It is too great for you!" The men fire their pistols at Napoleon but miss as he rides away.

While chasing Napoleon, di Borgo stretches a rope across a road that Napoleon is likely to take. As expected, Napoleon rides toward the rope, but he draws his sabre and cuts it down. Napoleon continues at high speed to the shore where he finds a small boat. He abandons the horse and gets into the boat, discovering that it has no oars or sail. He unfurls the French flag from Ajaccio and uses it as a sail. He is drawn out into the open sea.

Meanwhile, in Paris, meeting in the National Assembly, the majority Girondists are losing to the Montagnards: Robespierre, Danton, Marat and their followers. Robespierre calls for all Girondists to be indicted. (Napoleon's boat is tossed by increasing waves.) The Girondists seek to flee but are repulsed. (A storm throws Napoleon back and forth in his boat.) The assembly hall rolls with the struggle between Girondists and Montagnards. (Napoleon grimly bails water to prevent his violently rocking boat from sinking.)

Later, in calm water, the small boat is seen by Lucien and Joseph Buonaparte aboard a French ship, Le Hasard. The larger ship is steered to rescue the unknown boat, and as it is pulled close, Napoleon is recognised, lying unconscious at the bottom, gripping the French flag. Waking, Napoleon directs the ship to a cove in Corsica where the Buonaparte family is rescued. The ship sails for France carrying a future queen, three future kings, and the future Emperor of France. The British warship HMS Agamemnon sights Le Hasard, and a young officer, Horatio Nelson (Olaf Fjord), asks his captain if he might be allowed to shoot at the enemy vessel and sink it. The captain denies the request, saying that the target is too unimportant to waste powder and shot. As Le Hasard sails away, an eagle flies to the Buonapartes and lands on the ship's flagpole.

=== Act II ===
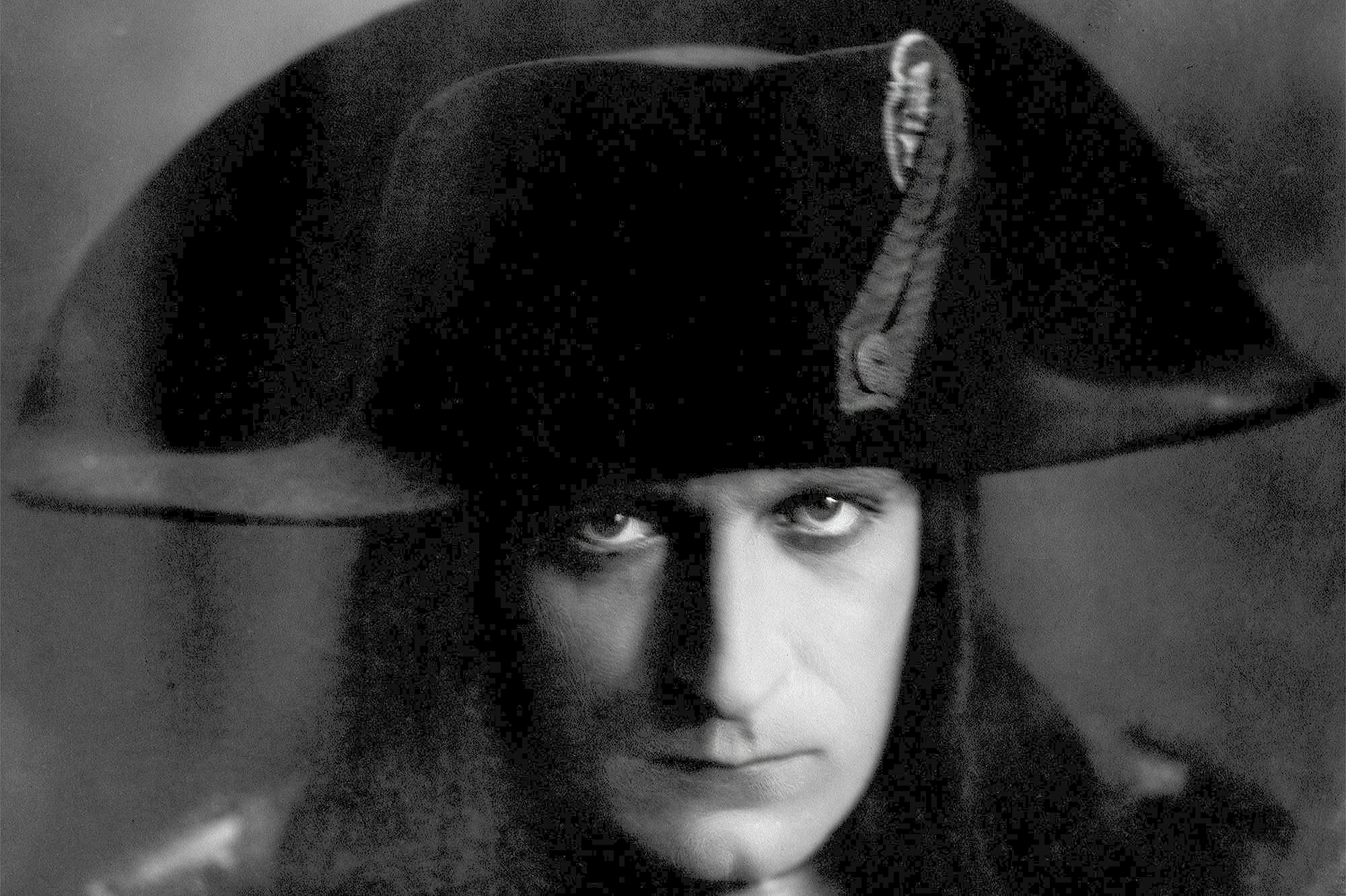
Actor Albert Dieudonné played Napoleon

In July 1793, fanatic Girondist Charlotte Corday (Marguerite Gance) visits Marat in his home and kills him with a knife. Two months later, General Jean François Carteaux (Léon Courtois), in control of a French army, is ineffectively besieging the port of Toulon, held by 20,000 English, Spanish and Italian troops. Captain Napoleon is assigned to the artillery section and is dismayed by the obvious lack of French discipline. He confronts Carteaux in an inn run by Tristan Fleuri, formerly the scullion of Brienne. Napoleon advises Carteaux how best to engage the artillery against Toulon, but Carteaux is dismissive. An enemy artillery shot hits the inn and scatters the officers. Napoleon stays to study a map of Toulon while Fleuri's young son Marcellin (Serge Freddy-Karl) mimes with Napoleon's hat and sword. Fleuri's beautiful daughter Violine Fleuri (Annabella) admires Napoleon silently.

General Jacques François Dugommier (Alexandre Bernard) replaces Carteaux and asks Napoleon to join in war planning. Later, Napoleon sees a cannon being removed from a fortification and demands that it be returned. He fires a shot at the enemy and establishes the position as the "Battery of Men Without Fear". French soldiers rally around Napoleon with heightened spirits. Dugommier advances Napoleon to the position of commander-in-chief of the artillery.

French troops under Napoleon prepare for a midnight attack. Veteran soldier Moustache (Henry Krauss) tells 7-year-old Marcellin, now a drummer boy, that the heroic drummer boy Joseph Agricol Viala was 13 when he was killed in battle. Marcellin takes courage; he expects to have six years of life left. Napoleon orders the attack forward amidst rain and high wind. A reversal causes Antoine Christophe Saliceti (Philippe Hériat) to name Napoleon's strategy a great crime. Consequently, Dugommier orders Napoleon to cease attacking, but Napoleon discusses the matter with Dugommier and the attack is carried forward successfully despite Saliceti's warnings. English cannon positions are taken in bloody hand-to-hand combat, lit by lightning flashes and whipped by rain. Because of the French advance, English Admiral Samuel Hood (W. Percy Day) orders the burning of the moored French fleet before French troops can recapture the ships. The next morning, Dugommier, seeking to promote Napoleon to the rank of brigadier general, finds him asleep, exhausted. An eagle beats its wings as it perches on a tree next to Napoleon. ('End of the First Epoch'.)

=== Act III ===
After being shamed in Toulon, Saliceti wants to put Napoleon on trial. Robespierre says he should be offered the command of Paris, but if he refuses, he will be tried. Robespierre, supported by Georges Couthon (Louis Vonelly) and Louis Antoine de Saint-Just (Abel Gance), condemns Danton to death. Saint-Just puts Joséphine into prison at Les Carmes where she is comforted by General Lazare Hoche (Pierre Batcheff). Fleuri, now a jailer, calls for "De Beauharnais" to be executed, and Joséphine's ex-husband, Alexandre de Beauharnais (Georges Cahuzac) rises to accept his fate. Elsewhere, Napoleon is also imprisoned for refusing to serve under Robespierre. He works out the possibility of building a canal to Suez as Saliceti taunts him for not trying to form a legal defence.

In an archive room filled with the files of condemned prisoners, clerks Bonnet (Boris Fastovich-Kovanko) and La Bussière (Jean d'Yd) work secretly with Fleuri to destroy (by eating) some of the dossiers including those for Napoleon and Joséphine. Meanwhile, at the National Assembly, Violine with her little brother Marcellin watches from the gallery. Voices are raised against Robespierre and Saint-Just. Jean-Lambert Tallien (Jean Gaudrey) threatens Robespierre with a knife. Violine decides not to shoot Saint-Just with a pistol she brought. Back at the archives, the prison clerks are given new dossiers on those to be executed by guillotine: Robespierre, Saint-Just and Couthon.

Joséphine and Napoleon are released from their separate prisons. Napoleon declines the request by General Aubry to command infantry in the War in the Vendée under General Hoche, saying he would not fight Frenchman against Frenchman when 200,000 foreigners were threatening the country. He is given a minor map-making command as punishment for refusing the greater post. He draws up plans for an invasion of Italy. In Nice, General Schérer (Alexandre Mathillon) sees the plans and laughs at the foolhardy proposal. The plans are sent back, and Napoleon pastes them up to cover a broken window in the poor apartment he shares with Captain Marmont (Pierre de Canolle), Sergeant Junot (Jean Henry) and the actor Talma (Roger Blum). Napoleon and Junot see the contrast of cold, starving people outside of wealthy houses.

Joséphine convinces Barras to suggest to the National Assembly that Napoleon is the best man to quell a royalist uprising. On 3 October 1795 Napoleon accepts and supplies 800 guns for defence. Directed by Napoleon, Major Joachim Murat (Genica Missirio) seizes a number of cannons to fight the royalists. Di Borgo shoots at Napoleon but misses; di Borgo is then wounded by Fleuri's accidental musket discharge. Saliceti is prevented from escaping in disguise. Napoleon sets Saliceti and di Borgo free. Joseph Fouché (Guy Favières) tells Joséphine that the noise of the fighting is Napoleon "entering history again". Napoleon is made General in Chief of the Army of the Interior to great celebration.

A Victim's Ball is held at Les Carmes, formerly the prison where Joséphine was held. To amuse the attendees, Fleuri re-enacts the tragedy of the executioner's roll-call. The beauty of Joséphine is admired by Thérésa Tallien (Andrée Standard) and Madame Juliette Récamier (Suzy Vernon), and Napoleon is also fascinated. He plays chess with Hoche, beating him as Joséphine watches and entices Napoleon with her charms. The dancers at the ball become uninhibited; the young women begin to dance partially nude.

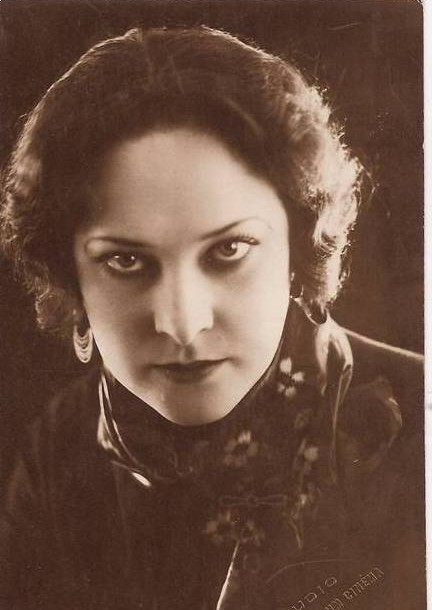
French actress Gina Manès played Joséphine de Beauharnais, Napoleon's wife.

In his army office, Napoleon tells 14-year-old Eugène de Beauharnais (Georges Hénin) that he can keep his executed father's sword. The next day, Joséphine arrives with Eugène to thank Napoleon for this kindness to her only son. The general staff officers wait for hours while Napoleon clumsily tries to convey his feelings for Joséphine. Later, Napoleon practises his amorous style under the guidance of his old friend Talma, the actor. Napoleon visits Joséphine daily. Violine is greatly hurt to see Napoleon's attentions directed away from herself. In trade for agreeing to marry Napoleon, Joséphine demands of Barras that he place Napoleon in charge of the French Army of Italy. Playing with Joséphine's children, Napoleon narrowly misses seeing Barras in her home. Joséphine hires Violine as a servant.

Napoleon plans to invade Italy. He wishes to marry Joséphine as quickly as possible before he leaves. Hurried preparations go forward. On the wedding day, 9 March 1796, Napoleon is 2 hours late. He is found in his room planning the Italian campaign, and the wedding ceremony is rushed. That night, Violine and Joséphine both prepare for the wedding bed. Violine prays to a shrine of Napoleon. Joséphine and Napoleon embrace at the bed. In the next room, Violine kisses a shadowy figure of Napoleon that she has created from a doll.

=== Act IV ===
Just before leaving Paris, Napoleon enters the empty National Assembly hall at night, and sees the spirits of those who had set the Revolution in motion. The ghostly figures of Danton and Saint-Just speak to Napoleon, and demand answers from him regarding his plan for France. All the spirits sing "La Marseillaise".

Only 48 hours after his wedding, Napoleon leaves Paris in a coach for Nice. He writes dispatches, and letters to Joséphine. Back in Paris, Joséphine and Violine pray at the little shrine to Napoleon.

Napoleon speeds to Albenga on horseback to find the army officers resentful and the soldiers starving. He orders a review of the troops. The troops respond quickly to the commanding presence of Napoleon and bring themselves to perfect attention. Fleuri, now a soldier, tries and fails to get a hint of recognition from Napoleon. The Army of Italy is newly filled with fighting spirit. Napoleon encourages them for the coming campaign into Italy, the "honour, glory and riches" which will be theirs upon victory. The underfed and poorly armed force advances into Montenotte and takes the town. Further advances carry Napoleon to Montezemolo. As he gazes upon the Alps, visions appear to him of future armies, future battles, and the face of Joséphine. The French troops move forward triumphantly as the vision of an eagle fills their path, a vision of the blue, white and red French flag waving before them.

== Primary cast ==
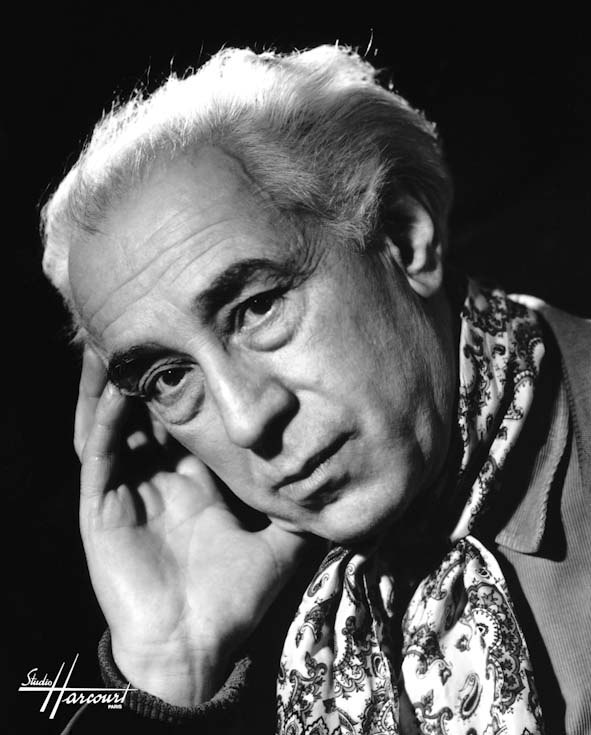
Abel Gance wrote, produced, directed, and acted in the film.

- Albert Dieudonné as Napoléon
  - Vladimir Roudenko as Napoléon Bonaparte (child)
- Edmond Van Daële as Maximilien Robespierre
- Alexandre Koubitzky as Georges Danton
- Antonin Artaud as Jean-Paul Marat
- Abel Gance as Louis de Saint-Just
- Gina Manès as Joséphine de Beauharnais
- Marguerite Gance as Charlotte Corday
- Yvette Dieudonné as Élisa Bonaparte
- Philippe Hériat as Antoine Saliceti
- Max Maxudian as Barras
- Acho Chakatouny as Pozzo di Borgo
- Annabella as Violine Fleuri
- Nicolas Koline as Tristan Fleuri
- Maurice Schutz as Pasquale Paoli
- Andrée Standart as Thérésa Tallien
- Suzy Vernon as Madame Récamier
- Petit Vidal as Phélippeaux
- Francine Mussey as Lucile Desmoulins
- Robert Vidalin as Camille Desmoulins
- Louis Vonelly as Couthon
- Jean d'Yd as La Bussière
- René Jeanne as Jean-Charles Pichegru
- Henri Beaulieu as Beaumarchais

== Music ==
The film features Gance's interpretation of the birth of the song "La Marseillaise", the national anthem of France. In the film, the French singer Maryse Damia portrays the spirit of the song. "La Marseillaise" is played by the orchestra repeatedly during a scene at the Club of the Cordeliers, and again at other points in the plot. During the 1927 Paris Opera premiere, the song was sung live by Alexandre Koubitzky to accompany the Cordeliers scene. Koubitzky played Danton in the film, but he was also a well-known singer. Gance had earlier asked Koubitzky and Damia to sing during the filming of the Cordeliers scene to inspire the cast and extras. Kevin Brownlow wrote in 1983 that he thought it was "daring" of Gance "to make a song the highpoint of a silent film!"

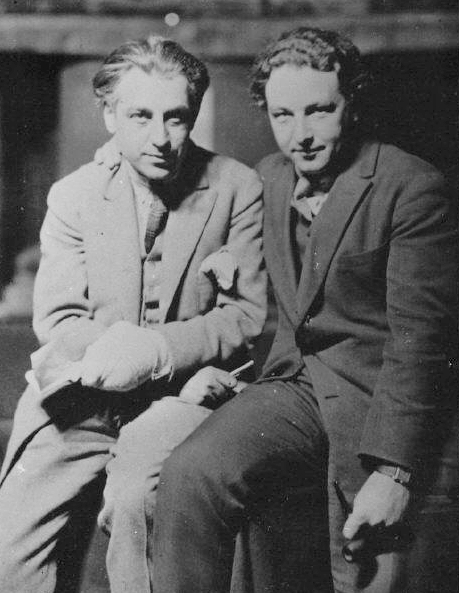
Abel Gance (left) and composer Arthur Honegger in 1926.

The majority of the film is accompanied by incidental music. For this material, the original score was composed by Arthur Honegger in 1927 in France. A separate score was written by Werner Heymann in Germany, also in 1927. In pace with Brownlow's efforts to restore the movie to something close to its 1927 incarnation, two scores were prepared in 1979–1980; one by Carl Davis in the UK and one by Carmine Coppola in the US.

Beginning in late 1979, Carmine Coppola composed a score incorporating themes taken from various sources such as Ludwig van Beethoven, Hector Berlioz, Bedřich Smetana, Felix Mendelssohn and George Frideric Handel. He composed three original themes: a heroic one for Napoleon, a love theme for scenes with Josephine, and a Buonaparte family theme. He also used French revolutionary songs that were supplied by Davis in early 1980 during a London meeting between Coppola, Davis and Brownlow. Two such songs were "Ah! ça ira" and "La Carmagnole". Coppola returns to "La Marseillaise" as the finale. Coppola's score was heard first in New York at Radio City Music Hall performed for very nearly four hours, accompanying a film projected at 24 frames per second as suggested by producer Robert A. Harris. Coppola included some sections of music carried solely by an organist to relieve the 60-piece orchestra.

Working quickly from September 1980, Davis arranged a score based on selections of classical music; especially the Eroica Symphony by Beethoven who had initially admired Napoleon as a liberator, and had dedicated the symphony to Napoleon. Taking this as an opportunity to research the music Napoleon would have heard, Davis also used folk music from Corsica, French revolutionary songs, a tune from Napoleon's favourite opera (Nina by Giovanni Paisiello) and pieces by other classical composers who were active in France in the 18th century. Davis uses "La Marseillaise" as a recurring theme and returns to it during Napoleon's vision of ghostly patriots at the National Assembly. In scoring the film, Davis was assisted by David Gill and Liz Sutherland; the three had just completed the Thames Television documentary series Hollywood (1980), on the silent film era. To accompany a screening of 4 hours 50 minutes shown at 20 frames per second during the 24th London Film Festival, Davis conducted the Wren Orchestra. Following this, work continued on restoration of the film with the goal of finding more footage to make a more complete version. In 2000, Davis lengthened his score and a new version of the movie was shown in London, projected at 20 frames per second for 5 hours 32 minutes. The 2000 score was performed in London in 2004 and 2013, and also in Oakland, California, in 2012, with Davis conducting local orchestras.

== Triptych sequence ==
The triptych finale of Napoleon showing its two vertical seams.

Polyvision is the name that French film critic Émile Vuillermoz gave to a specialised widescreen film format devised exclusively for the filming and projection of Gance's Napoléon. It involves the simultaneous projection of three reels of silent film arrayed in a horizontal row, making for a total aspect ratio of 4.00:1 (3× 1.33:1). Gance was worried the film's finale would not have the proper impact by being confined to a small screen. Gance thought of expanding the frame by using three cameras next to each other. This is considered to be the best-known of the film's several innovative techniques. Though American filmmakers began experimenting with 70mm widescreen (such as Fox Grandeur) in 1929, widescreen did not take off until CinemaScope was introduced in 1953.

Polyvision was only used for the final reel of Napoleon, to create a climactic finale. Filming the whole story in Polyvision was logistically difficult as Gance wished for a number of innovative shots, each requiring greater flexibility than was allowed by three interlocked cameras. When the film was greatly trimmed by the distributors early on during exhibition, the new version only retained the centre strip to allow projection in standard single-projector cinemas. Gance was unable to eliminate the problem of the two seams dividing the three panels of film as shown on screen, so he avoided the problem by putting three completely different shots together in some of the Polyvision scenes. When Gance viewed Cinerama for the first time in 1955, he noticed the widescreen image was still not seamless, and the problem was not entirely fixed.

== Restorations ==
The Apollo Theatre in France, during the 1927 theatrical release of Napoléon.

Film historian Kevin Brownlow conducted reconstructions of the film in the years leading up to 1980, including the Polyvision scenes. As a boy, Brownlow had purchased two 9.5 mm reels of the film from a street market. He was captivated by the cinematic boldness of short clips, and his research led to a lifelong fascination with the film and a quest to reconstruct it. On 31 August 1979, Napoléon was shown to a crowd of hundreds at the Telluride Film Festival, in Telluride, Colorado. The film was presented in full Polyvision at the specially constructed Abel Gance Open Air Cinema, which is still in use today. Gance was in the audience until the chilly air drove him indoors after which he watched from the window of his room at the New Sheridan Hotel. Kevin Brownlow was also in attendance and presented Gance with his Silver Medallion.

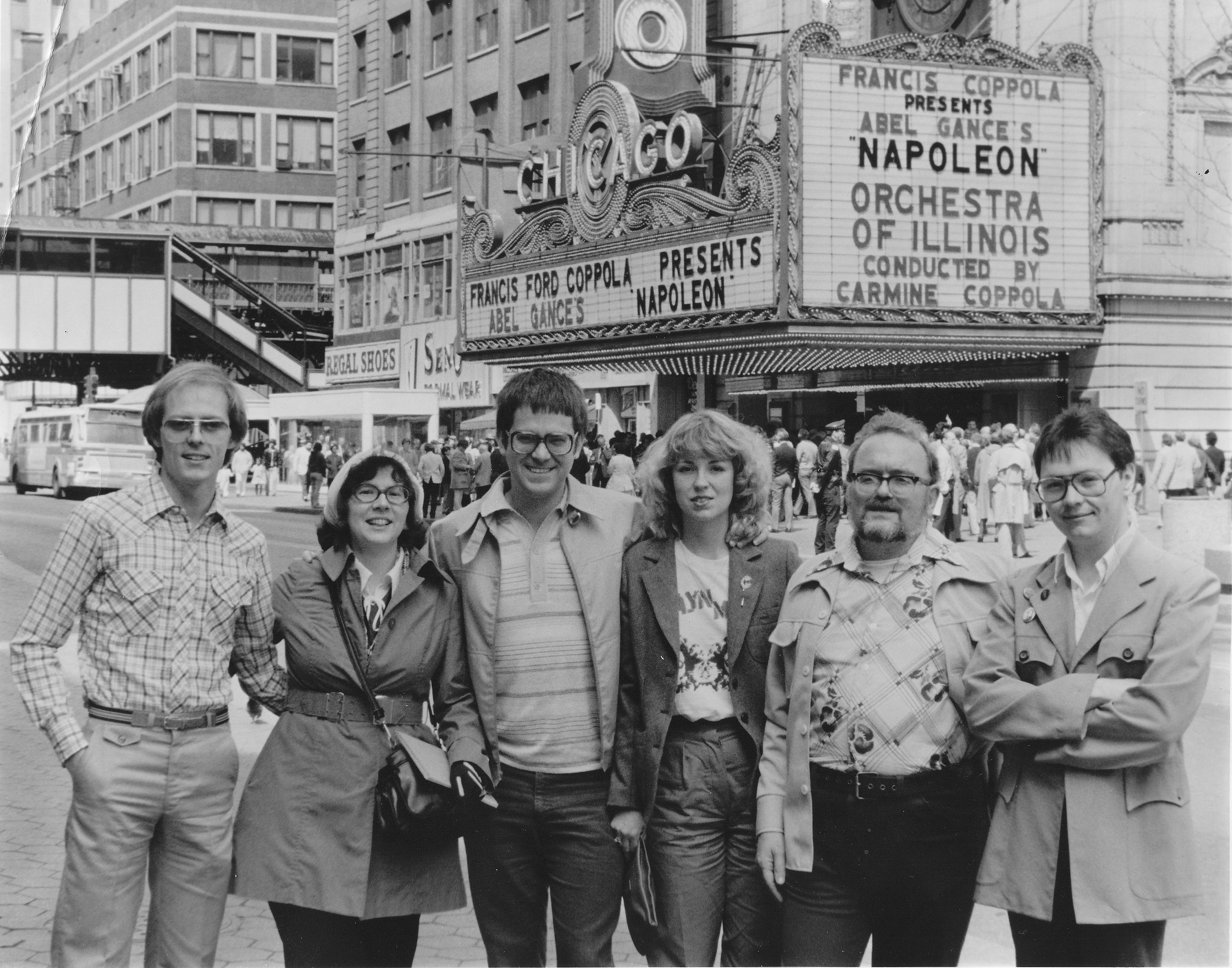
A group of friends gathers outside of the Chicago Theatre in 1981 to see Francis Ford Coppola's version of Napoléon

Brownlow's 1980 reconstruction was re-edited and released in the United States by American Zoetrope (through Universal Pictures) with a score by Carmine Coppola performed live at the screenings. The restoration premiered in the United States at Radio City Music Hall in New York City on 23–25 January 1981; each performance showed to a standing room only house. Gance could not attend because of poor health. At the end of 24 January screening, a telephone was brought onstage and the audience was told that Gance was listening on the other end and wished to know what they had thought of his film. The audience erupted in an ovation of applause and cheers that lasted several minutes. The acclaim surrounding the film's revival brought Gance much-belated recognition as a master director before his death eleven months later, in November 1981.

Another restoration was made by Brownlow in 1983. When it was screened at the Barbican Centre in London, French actress Annabella, who plays the fictional character Violine in the film (personifying France in her plight, beset by enemies from within and without), was in attendance. She was introduced to the audience prior to screenings and during one of the intervals sat alongside Kevin Brownlow, signing copies of the latter's book about the history and restoration of the film. Brownlow re-edited the film again in 2000, including previously missing footage rediscovered by the Cinémathèque Française in Paris. Altogether, 35 minutes of reclaimed film had been added, making the 2000 restoration five and a half hours.

The film is only very rarely screened in full restoration, due to the expense of the orchestra and the difficult requirement of three synchronised projectors and three screens for the Polyvision section. One such screening was at the Royal Festival Hall in London in December 2004, including a live orchestral score of classical music extracts arranged and conducted by Carl Davis. The screening itself was the subject of hotly contested legal threats from Francis Ford Coppola via Universal Studios to the British Film Institute over whether the latter had the right to screen the film without the Coppola score. An understanding was reached and the film was screened for both days. Coppola's single-screen version of the film was last projected for the public at the Los Angeles County Museum of Art in two showings in celebration of Bastille Day on 13–14 July 2007, using a 70 mm print struck by Universal Studios in the early 1980s.

At the San Francisco Silent Film Festival in July 2011, Brownlow announced there would be four screenings of his 2000 version, shown at the original 20 frames per second, with the final triptych and a live orchestra, to be held at the Paramount Theatre in Oakland, California, from 24 March to 1 April 2012. These, the first US screenings of his 5.5-hour-long restoration were described as requiring 3 intermissions, one of which was a dinner break. Score arranger Carl Davis led the 46-piece Oakland East Bay Symphony for the performances.

At a screening of Napoléon on 30 November 2013, at the Royal Festival Hall in London, full to capacity, the film and orchestra received a standing ovation, without pause, from the front of the stalls to the rear of the balcony. Davis conducted the Philharmonia Orchestra in a performance that spanned a little over eight hours, including a 100-minute dinner break.

On 13 November 2016, Napoléon was the subject of the Film Programme on BBC Radio 4. The BBC website announced: "Historian Kevin Brownlow tells Francine Stock about his 50-year quest to restore Abel Gance's silent masterpiece Napoleon to its five and half-hour glory, and why the search for missing scenes still continues even though the film is about to be released on DVD for the very first time."

A restoration of the almost-seven-hour-long so-called Apollo version (i.e. the version of Napoléon shown at the Apollo Theatre in Paris in 1927), conducted by Cinémathèque Française under the direction of the restorer and director Georges Mourier, and financed by the CNC along with Netflix, was scheduled to be completed by 5 May 2021. Because of complications associated with the restoration process, the release was postponed, and premiered in France in July 2024.

The five-and-a-half hour Brownlow-edited version of the film sold out a two-day run at the Film Forum in Manhattan in early November 2025. This was believed to be the first screening of the film in New York City since 1981.

Released versions and screenings

Date	Title	Film length (meters)	Time (Hours:Minutes)	FPS	Editor	Score	Venues	Triptych	Format
April 1927	Napoléon	5,400	4:10	20	Marguerite Beaugé	Arthur Honegger	Paris Opera	toned	35 mm
May 1927	Napoléon (version définitive)	12,800	9:22	20	Abel Gance	Arthur Honegger	Apollo Theatre, Paris	none	35 mm
October 1927	Napoléon (UFA)		<3:00	20	Universum Film AG	Werner Heymann	Germany and Central Europe	toned	35 mm
November 1927	Napoléon		4:10 (shown in two seatings, some scenes repeated)	20	Abel Gance	Arthur Honegger	Marivaux Theatre, Paris	toned, shown twice	35 mm
Winter 1927–28	Napoléon	various	various	20			French provinces		35 mm
ca. 1928	Napoleon (version définitive as sent to the U.S. in 29 reels)	8,800	6:43	20	Abel Gance		none	none	35 mm
March–April 1928	Napoléon (Gaumont)		~3:00 (Shown in two parts)	20	Gaumont	Arthur Honegger	Gaumont-Palace, Paris	none	35 mm
June 1928	Napoleon (UK 1928)	11,400	7:20	20	Abel Gance	Arthur Honegger	UK	toned	35 mm
January 1929	Napoleon (USA 1929)	2,400	1:51	20	Metro-Goldwyn-Mayer		USA	none	35 mm
ca. 1928	Napoléon (Pathé-Rural)	17 reels		20			Rural France	none	17.5 mm
1928	Napoléon (Pathé-Baby)	9 reels		20			French homes	none	9.5 mm
1929	Napoléon (Pathescope)	6 reels		20			UK homes	none	9.5 mm
1935	Napoléon Bonaparte vu et entendu par Abel Gance	4,000, later 3,000		20	Abel Gance	Henri Verdun		none	35 mm
1935	Napoléon Bonaparte (Film-Office version)	1,500		20	Abel Gance	Henri Verdun		none	16 mm 9.5 mm 8 mm
1955	Napoléon Bonaparte (Studio 28 version)							black and white	35 mm
1965	Napoléon				Henri Langlois		Cinémathèque Française	none	35 mm
1970	Bonaparte et la Révolution		4:45 (4:00 at 24 fps)	20	Abel Gance			none	35 mm
1979	Napoléon (Brownlow)		4:55	20	Kevin Brownlow	None: ad lib accompaniment on electronic piano	Telluride Film Festival, Colorado	black and white	35 mm
1980	Napoléon (Brownlow 1980)	6,630	4:50	20	Kevin Brownlow	Carl Davis	Edinburgh Film Festival; National Film Theatre, London	black and white	35 mm
1981	Napoleon (Coppola)		4:00	24	Francis Ford Coppola	Carmine Coppola	Radio City Music Hall, New York City	tinted	35 mm
1983	Napoléon (Brownlow 1983)	7,155	5:13	20	Kevin Brownlow	Carl Davis	Cinémathèque Française	black and white	35 mm
1983	Napoléon (Brownlow 1983 TV cut)		4:50	20	Kevin Brownlow	Carl Davis	Channel 4 (UK television)	none	35 mm
1989	Napoleon (Brownlow 1980)	6,630	4:50	20	Kevin Brownlow	Marius Constant	Cité de la Musique, Paris	none	35 mm
1989	Napoléon (Brownlow 1989 TV cut)		4:50	20	Kevin Brownlow	Carl Davis	Channel 4 (UK television)	toned, letterboxed inside 4:3	35 mm
2000	Napoléon (Brownlow 2000)	7,542	5:30	20	Kevin Brownlow	Carl Davis	Royal Festival Hall, London	toned	35 mm
2004	Napoléon (Brownlow 2004)	7,542	5:32	20	Kevin Brownlow	Carl Davis	Royal Festival Hall, London	toned	35 mm
2012	Napoléon (Brownlow 2004)	7,542	5:32	20	Kevin Brownlow	Carl Davis	Paramount Theatre, Oakland	toned	35 mm
2013	Napoléon (Brownlow 2004)	7,542	5:32	20	Kevin Brownlow	Carl Davis	Royal Festival Hall, London	toned	35 mm
2014	Napoléon (Brownlow 2004)	7,542	5:32	20	Kevin Brownlow	Carl Davis	Ziggo Dome, Amsterdam	toned	35 mm
2016	Napoléon (Brownlow 2004)	7,542	5:32	20	Kevin Brownlow	Carl Davis	Royal Festival Hall – London, BFI Southbank, Bristol Watershed	toned	DCP (2K scan)
2024	Napoléon (Mourier)		7:05	18	Georges Mourier	Frank Strobel	La Seine Musicale, Paris	toned	DCP (5K scan)
2025	Napoléon (Brownlow 2004)	7.542	5:32	20	Kevin Brownlow	Carl Davis	Film Forum, New York City	toned	DCP (2K scan)
2026	Napoléon (Brownlow 2004)	7.542	5:32	20	Kevin Brownlow	Carl Davis	National Gallery of Art, Washington, DC	toned	DCP (2K scan)

== Legacy ==
Napoléon is widely considered to be one of the greatest and most innovative films of not only the silent era but also of all time. Review aggregator Rotten Tomatoes reports that 87% of critics have given the film a positive review, based upon 68 reviews, with an average score of 9.3/10. The website's critics consensus reads: "Monumental in scale and distinguished by innovative technique, Napoléon is an expressive epic that maintains a singular intimacy with its subject."

Anita Brookner of London Review of Books wrote that the film has an "energy, extravagance, ambition, orgiastic pleasure, high drama and the desire for endless victory: not only Napoleon’s destiny but everyone’s most central hope." The 2012 screening has been acclaimed, with Mick LaSalle of the San Francisco Chronicle calling the film, "A rich feast of images and emotions." He also praised the triptych finale, calling it, "An overwhelming and surprisingly emotional experience." Judith Martin of The Washington Post wrote that the film "inspires that wonderfully satisfying theatrical experience of whole-heartedly cheering a hero and hissing villains, while also providing the uplift that comes from a real work of art" and praised its visual metaphors, editing, and tableaus. Peter Bradshaw wrote in The Guardian that Napoléon "looks startlingly futuristic and experimental, as if we are being shown something from the 21st century’s bleeding edge. It’s as if it has evolved beyond spoken dialogue into some colossal mute hallucination." Mark Kermode described the film "as significant to the evolution of cinema as the works of Sergei Eisenstein and D. W. Griffith" that "created a kaleidoscopic motion picture which stretched the boundaries of the screen in every way possible."

Director Stanley Kubrick was not a fan of the film, saying in an interview "I found it really terrible. Technically [Gance] was ahead of his time and he introduced new film techniques – in fact Eisenstein credited him with stimulating his initial interest in montage – but as far as story and performance goes it's a very crude picture."

It is included by the Vatican in a list of important films, as compiled in 1995, under the category of "Art".

== Home media ==
For many years the Brownlow restoration with Carl Davis's score was unavailable for home viewing. In 2016 it was released by BFI and Photoplay Productions on DVD, Blu-ray and for streaming via the BFI Player.

Francis Ford Coppola's 1981 edit (3 hours and 43 minutes), accompanied by Carmine Coppola's score and projected at 24 fps, has been released on VHS and Laserdisc in the US, and in Australia on a Region 4 DVD. These have also been pirated on DVDs emanating from Europe and elsewhere. To suit home viewers watching on a single standard-width television screen, the triptych portion is letterboxed, such that image height is reduced to one-third for that portion of the film.

A 4K Blu-ray release of the Mourier restoration was announced by French label Potemkine for November 4, 2025.

== See also ==
- Cultural depictions of Napoleon
- List of biographical films
- List of early color feature films
- List of longest films

== Bibliography ==
- Brownlow, Kevin (1968). The Parade's Gone By.... University of California Press. ISBN 0-520-03068-0.
- Brownlow, Kevin (1983). Napoleon: Abel Gance's classic film (1 ed.). New York: Knopf. ISBN 0-394-53394-1.
- Brownlow, Kevin (2004). Napoleon: Abel Gance's classic film (2 ed.). London: Photoplay. ISBN 1-84457-077-0.
