= Thames Television =

Former ITV weekday service for London

- Thames "London Skyline" ident, featuring London landmarks

- The Thames Television region when it lost its franchise in 1992
- Type: Region of television network
- Branding: Thames
- Country: England
- First air date: 30 July 1968; 58 years ago
- Founded: 31 January 1968; 58 years ago (ITV franchisee); 1 January 1993; 33 years ago (production company)
- Motto: A Talent For Television
- TV transmitters: Crystal Palace, Bluebell Hill, Croydon
- Headquarters: Teddington Studios, London, United Kingdom
- Broadcast area: London
- Owner: Thorn EMI (51%) and BET plc (49%) (until 1993); Pearson plc (1993–2000); RTL Group (2000–2006)
- Parent: Thorn EMI (1968–1993); FremantleMedia (1993–2006)
- Key people: Jeremy Isaacs, Bryan Cowgill, Brian Tesler, David Elstein, Richard Dunn
- Dissolved: 31 December 1992; 33 years ago (ITV franchisee); 2006; 20 years ago (production company) (Note: Still legally exists as a dormant company according to Companies House records.)
- Picture format: 405 line (1968-1985); 625 line PAL colour (1969-1992)
- Affiliation: ITV
- Language: English
- Replaced: As ITV franchisee: Rediffusion London; As company: ABC Weekend TV; Rediffusion London
- Replaced by: As ITV franchisee: Carlton Television; As production company: Talkback Thames
- Subsidiary: Thames Video; Euston Films; Cosgrove Hall Productions (until 1992)

Thames Television, commonly simplified to just Thames, was a franchise holder for a region of the British ITV television network serving London and surrounding areas from 30 July 1968 until the night of 31 December 1992. Thames Television broadcast from 09:25 Monday morning to 17:15 Friday afternoon (19:00 Friday night until 1982) at which time it would hand over to London Weekend Television (LWT).

Formed as a joint company, it merged the television interests of British Electric Traction (trading as Associated-Rediffusion) owning 49%, and Associated British Picture Corporation—soon taken over by EMI—owning 51%. Like all ITV franchisees at that time, it was a broadcaster, a producer and a commissioner of television programmes, making shows both for the local region it covered and, as one of the "Big Five" ITV companies, for networking nationally across the ITV regions. After its loss of franchise in 1992, it continued as an independent production company until 2006.

The British Film Institute describes Thames as having "served the capital and the network with a long-running, broad-based and extensive series of programmes, several of which either continue or are well-remembered today." Thames covered a broad spectrum of commercial public-service television, with a strong mix of drama, current affairs and comedy.

After Thames was acquired by FremantleMedia it was merged with another Fremantle company, Talkback, to form a new independent production company, Talkback Thames; consequently, Thames ceased to exist as a separate entity, but it, along with Talkback's own logo, continued to be used separately until 2006, when a new logo for Talkback Thames was introduced. However, on 1 January 2012, the Thames brand was revived when Talkback Thames was split into four different labels: Boundless, Retort, Talkback and Thames, within the newly created FremantleMedia UK production arm. Thames was once again amalgamated with Talkback to form a new company called Talkback Thames in 2025.

== History ==
=== Formation ===
==== Background ====
From its formation in 1954, the Independent Television Authority (ITA) offered broadcasting licences to different companies for weekday and weekend service in its first three Independent Television network locations, the London area, the Midlands, and the North. The initial six contracts were parcelled out to different companies. Associated-Rediffusion (Rediffusion) won the London weekday service while Associated Television (ATV) operated weekends. ATV also won the weekday service in the Midlands, while ABC Weekend TV operated the weekend service. Granada Television won daytime service in the North, and ABC the weekends.

Geographical and structural changes led to the first significant shakeups of the network, a process that started in 1967 to take effect from 1968. As part of these changes, the separate weekend service was eliminated in the Midlands and North, who would instead be served by a single seven-day schedule. The London weekday/weekend split schedule remained the same, although the weekend contract was extended to include Friday evenings, but was opened to new applicants.

==== ABC loses franchises ====
As a result of the changes to the schedule, ABC was at risk of losing both of its existing franchises, the weekend services that would be going away. Consequently, ABC applied for both the Midlands seven-day operation and the contract to serve London at the weekend, preferring the latter.

It was widely expected that the company would be awarded the London weekend franchise. Instead, after an impressive application by a consortium led by David Frost and others, this market was awarded to what became London Weekend Television.

This led to a serious problem for the ITA as ABC was a popular station, whose productions earned vital foreign currency – one such series was The Avengers. Its station management and presentation style were also admired.

While they were still in the running for the seven-day service in the Midlands, it was clear this would be won by ATV, who was also a large earner of overseas revenue, having won the Queen's Award for Export in 1966.

==== Rediffusion angers the ITA ====
In programming, Rediffusion was originally considered stuffy but in the previous contract round of 1964, it had re-invented itself, dropping the name Associated-Rediffusion in favour of the trendier Rediffusion London, to reflect the cultural changes of the time, with its output altered accordingly.

By the time of the 1967 negotiations, Rediffusion believed that its contract renewal for London weekday service was a formality, and its application reflected this complacency: the company had treated the ITA high-handedly in interviews.

In the early days of ITV, the company had worked hard to keep the network on-air during financial crises that threatened the collapse of other companies, particularly Granada. It was reported that Rediffusion's chairman Sir John Spencer Wills felt the ITA owed his company a 'debt of gratitude' for this, a comment which particularly annoyed the authority.

During the interview process, several members of Rediffusion management also appeared in interviews for applicants for other regions, principally the consortium of which David Frost was a member, as well as the interview for Rediffusion, leading the ITA to question the loyalty at the company.

==== ABC and Rediffusion become Thames ====
The outcome proposed by the ITA was a "shotgun marriage" between ABC and Rediffusion. "The combination of these two companies," announced ITA Chairman Lord Hill, "seemed to the Authority to offer the possibility of a programme company of real excellence." The resultant company was awarded the contract to serve London on weekdays.

Control of the new company would be given to ABC, a move unpopular with Rediffusion. Questioning the ITA's decision, Rediffusion attempted to slow down the merger: only the threat of giving the licence solely to ABC made it relent. To assist Rediffusion financially, the ITA insisted that the new company have two sets of shares: voting shares which would allow ABC to have control (with 51%) and 'B' shares which were to be split equally between the two, thus sharing profits fairly.

The structure of the new company was also a problem. A merger between the two existing contract holders ABC Television Limited and Rediffusion Television Limited was impossible, owing to internal politics, as was a merger between their respective parent companies Associated British Picture Corporation and British Electric Traction. The answer was found to be a new holding company, Thames Television (Holdings) Ltd. ABC's parent, the Associated British Picture Corporation was taken over by EMI in 1969, and in 1979 became part of Thorn EMI.

The ITA ordered ABC's managing director Howard Thomas and its director of programmes Brian Tesler to be appointed in similar capacities at the new station, the only individuals named or specified in all 15 franchise awards. ABC had majority control of the new company and the make-up of its board predominantly (and eventually fully) came from ABC. The use of ABC's old studios at Teddington meant the workforce was predominantly ex-ABC, although those at Kingsway were ex-Rediffusion.

After some discussion as to the name of the new company—some directors favoured ABC London, while others suggested Tower Television to reflect the Post Office Tower and the Tower of London—it was named Thames Television, after the River Thames. This name had been previously considered and rejected by London Weekend Television.

On 30 July 1968, Thames began broadcasting to London. The opening week was disrupted by sporadic strike action; the following week, the action had spread to all of ITV and resulted in the creation of a management-run ITV Emergency National Service for some two weeks.

Each week Thames broadcast from the start of transmissions on Monday until its handover to London Weekend Television at 19:00 on Friday. (From 1982, the handover time was 17:15.)

=== Studios ===
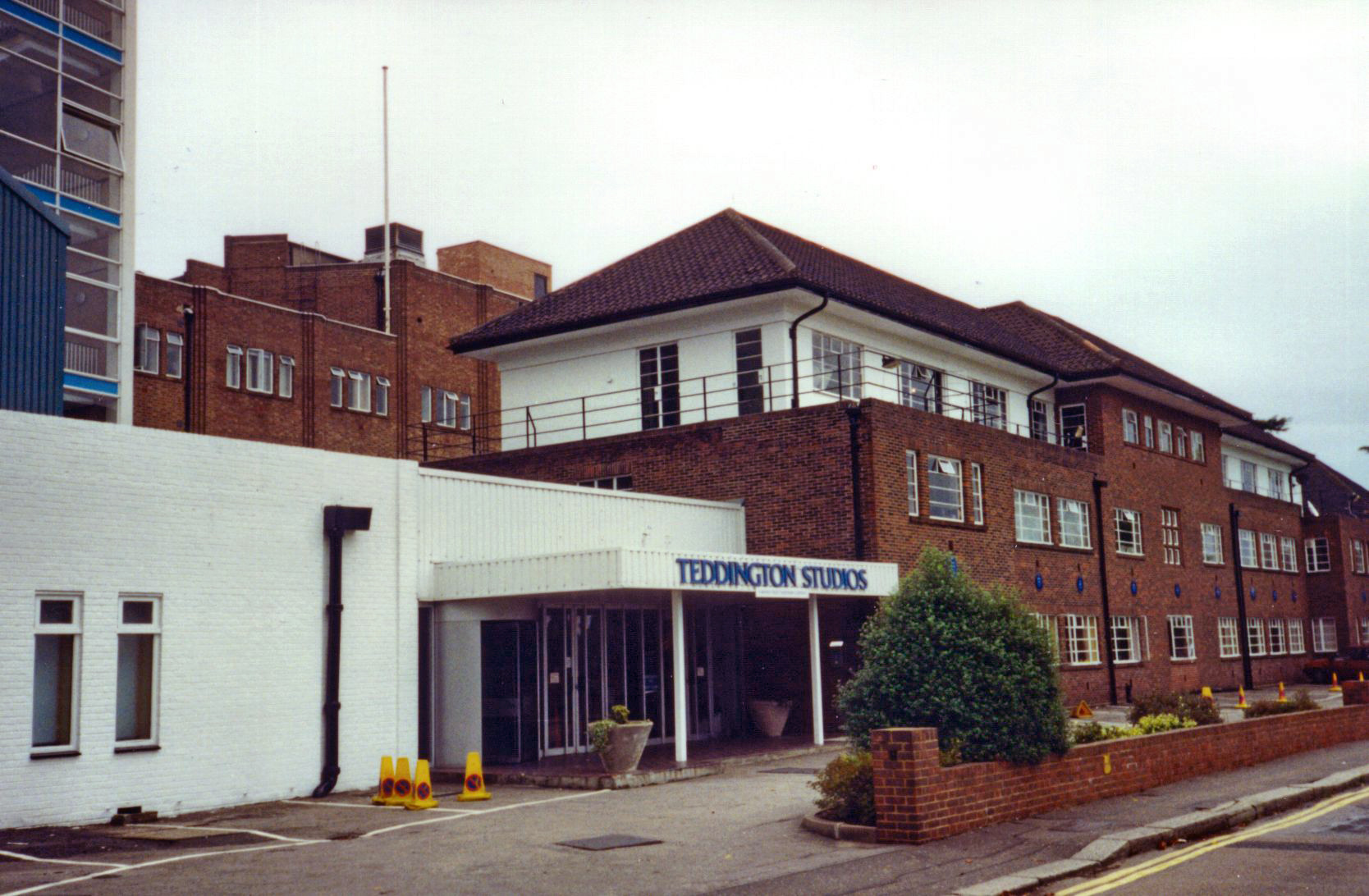
Thames's main studio complex at Teddington

The former ABC studios at Teddington became Thames's main production base. Thames's corporate base moved to its newly constructed studios and offices on Euston Road (next to Euston Tower) in 1970, when it relinquished Television House, Rediffusion's former London headquarters. The Teddington studios were highly desirable, as they had participated in colour experiments and were already partially converted by the time of the franchise change, and as such had been sought after by both Thames and LWT.

When Thames was formed, the new company acquired numerous other properties of the former franchise holders. Rediffusion's main studio complex at Wembley was leased to London Weekend Television by order of the ITA before being sold to Lee International in 1977. ABC's Midlands base in Aston, Birmingham (see Alpha Television), co-owned with ATV, was sold in 1971 when ATV moved to new colour television facilities. Its northern base in Didsbury, Manchester, was used by Yorkshire Television prior to its Kirkstall Road studios in Leeds being completed, and eventually sold to Manchester Polytechnic in 1970, with a lease on sales offices in central Manchester being surrendered.

=== Early programmes ===
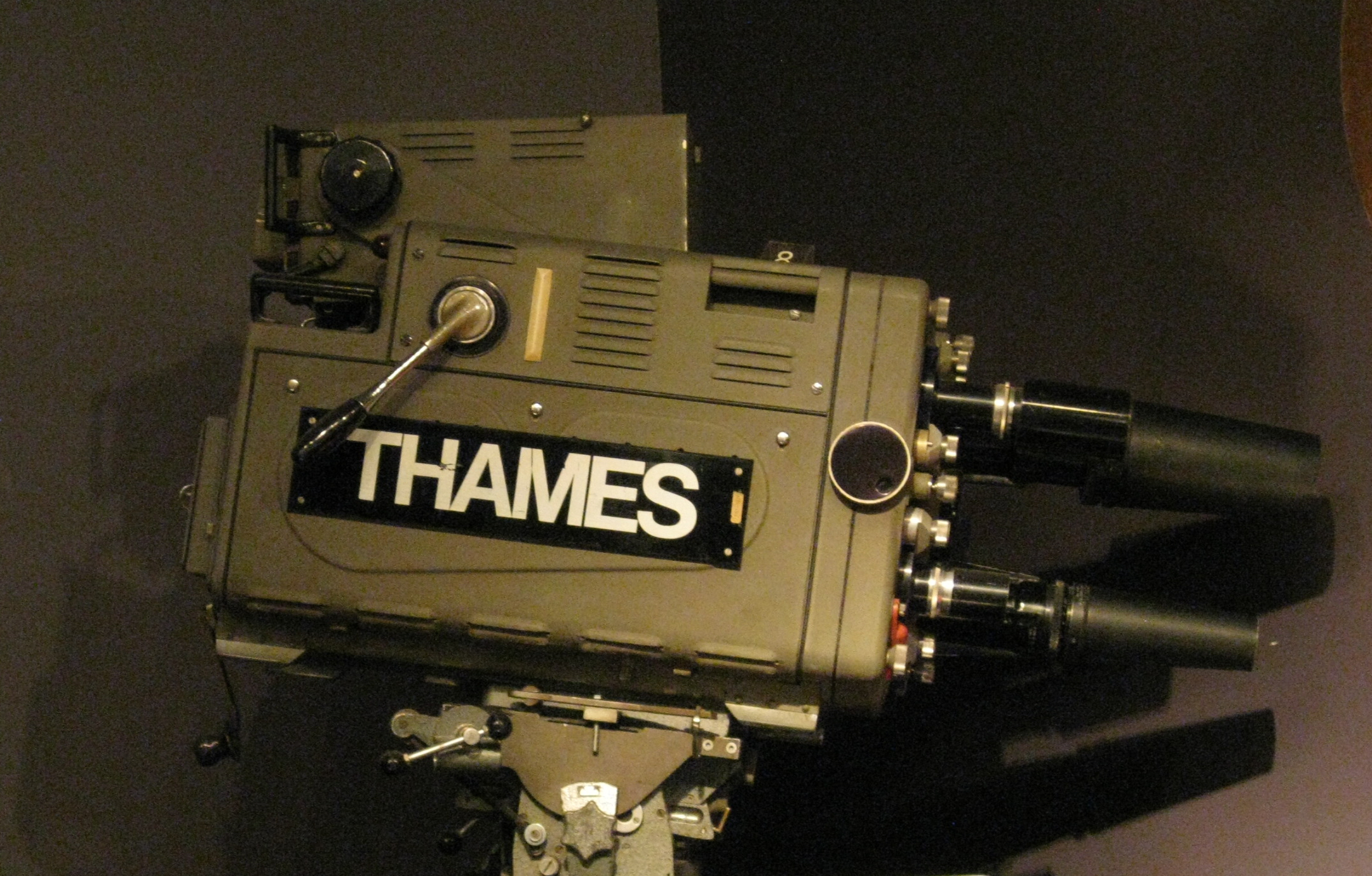
A Thames TV camera (a Marconi Mark 3) at the National Science and Media Museum, Bradford

Thames was among the "Big Five" franchises that provided much of the ITV schedule. The station continued formats inherited from its predecessors. These included the variety show Opportunity Knocks, Armchair Theatre, the last series of The Avengers, and the detective thrillers Callan and Public Eye, all inherited from ABC. The comedy Do Not Adjust Your Set, though, originated with Rediffusion, and if nominally a children's show, was one of the forerunners of Monty Python's Flying Circus.

More conventional sitcoms, all of which began in Thames's early years, included Father, Dear Father (1968–73), the Sid James vehicle Bless This House (1971–76), and Love Thy Neighbour (1972–76). Another sitcom, Man About the House (1973–76), was successful enough for two spin-offs, George and Mildred (1976–80) and Robin's Nest (1977-81).

The company took over the This Is Your Life format in 1969, several years after the BBC had dropped the show in 1964. Another BBC favourite was comedian Benny Hill, the star of The Benny Hill Show (1969–89), who was placed under contract. Hill spent most of the rest of his career with Thames.

The Sooty Show, cancelled in 1967 by the BBC, now aired on Thames and began on the first day of transmission. It continued after Harry Corbett's retirement in 1975 with his son, Matthew Corbett, and lasted on Thames until late 1992. The company also produced the children's show Magpie (1968–80), intended as a rival for Blue Peter on BBC1, and The Tomorrow People (1973–79), a science fiction series commissioned as an answer to the BBC's Doctor Who.

For preschool children there was Rainbow, which started in 1972 and ran for 20 years. The programme used animation and graphics created by Stop Frame Productions, which later became Cosgrove Hall, a Thames subsidiary founded in 1976 which made animated series for children. During the hours after Rainbow and before the children's slot, Good Afternoon was transmitted, a magazine programme. It began after the IBA allowed non-schools broadcasting in this period of the day, when the government relaxed the regulations around daytime television and featured interview editions undertaken by such broadcasters as Mavis Nicholson, and a weekly consumer programme, which eventually became a programme in its own right; Money-Go-Round.

Thames also produced The World at War (1973–74), a 26-part history of the Second World War using unseen footage and interviews, often of high-level participants. The series, narrated by Laurence Olivier, was commissioned in 1969, took four years to produce, and cost a record £4m (approx £47m in 2018).

Thames gained a reputation for drama with such series as Jenny, Lady Randolph Churchill (1974), with Lee Remick as the mother of Winston Churchill. It won an Emmy as the best series in its category, as Edward & Mrs. Simpson (1978), about the abdication crisis, did later. Other successful series in the genre from this period include Shades of Greene (1975–76), Rock Follies (1976), and Armchair Thriller (1978–80). These programmes were made in the then standard 'hybrid' studio video/location film format, but the British industry was in the slow process of dropping the multi-camera studio format for drama, excepting soaps, to making the genre entirely on film.

The Thames offshoot Euston Films was founded in 1971 to specialise in drama output made entirely on film, then still a rare practice. Euston made the police series The Sweeney (1975–78), Danger UXB (1979), and Minder (1979–94), plus the last appearance of Nigel Kneale's best known creation in Quatermass (1979). In this era, Euston also made single one-off dramas such as The Naked Civil Servant (1975).

On 1 December 1976, the punk band the Sex Pistols were interviewed live on Thames's regional news magazine programme, Today. Members of the group uttered obscenities during their interview with Bill Grundy. In his introduction, Grundy said they are "as drunk as I am", but later said his comment was a joke, and had allowed the bad language to illustrate the character of the individuals in the group. The interview filled two minutes at the end of the programme, but the production team feared trouble in the studio if they stopped the programme mid-air. Thames's telephone switchboard was jammed by complaining viewers. Responding to the incident, Thames said in a statement: "Because the programme was live, it was impossible to foresee the language that would be used." The press continued to be interested in the incident for several days. Grundy was suspended and Today ended soon afterwards; his career never recovered. Over time, Thames replaced Today with a more conventional news offering as seen on other ITV stations. Thames at Six was launched, later Thames News.

In 1978, Thames secured a contract with Morecambe & Wise. The comedians had worked for the BBC since 1968 with major national success, but the decisive factor leading the duo to leave the corporation was Thames's offer to feature them as main leads in a film made by the company's Euston Films subsidiary. The comedy duo's leading scriptwriter, Eddie Braben, did not initially move to ITV with them, and with Eric Morecambe's failing health, the new shows never gained the audiences or matched the esteem they had previously enjoyed.

One of the early anchor presenters was radio DJ Tom Edwards.

=== Industrial relations up to the end of 1979 ===
Like most of ITV, Thames was beset by conflicts with trade unions, notably the Association of Cinematograph Television and Allied Technicians (ACTT). A two-week technicians strike in the summer of 1975 shut down the whole of ITV with the technicians being bought off with a 35% pay rise.

Two years later in May 1977, another strike occurred when production assistants at Thames refused to operate new video equipment. Thames proceeded to sack all the technicians for breach of contract. The following month, both sides backed down over the issues, with all technicians returning to work.

The worst strike to hit the network originated at Thames. Failure to reach agreement on pay increases and shift allowances in the 1979 pay round resulted in technicians switching off power to the transmission facilities at the Euston Road centre on 6 August. After management restored power, the technicians walked out. Within four days, all but one ITV station had gone off-air after the ACTT asked members at other companies to walk out in claim for a 15% pay rise. The network was off the air for 10 weeks.

=== Later programming ===
Other Thames shows included This Week (known as TV Eye between 1979 and 1985), Rumpole of the Bailey, the game shows Strike It Lucky, Give Us a Clue and Name That Tune, and the drama Dodger, Bonzo and the Rest.

Thames sitcoms during the 1980s and early 1990s included Keep it in the Family, Never the Twain, After Henry, and Mr. Bean. The Mr. Bean pilot episode, starring Rowan Atkinson as the titular character, was first broadcast on ITV on 1 January 1990, and the eventual run lasted beyond Thames holding of its franchise. Less well-known is its adaptation of Andy Capp (1988), starring James Bolam. Two of its post-franchise sitcoms found more success when they transferred away from ITV – Men Behaving Badly, which moved to the BBC in 1994 and Is It Legal?, which moved to Channel 4 in 1998. Both were written by Simon Nye and co-produced by independent company Hartswood Films.

A few years after The World at War, Thames broadcast Hollywood (1980), a 13-part documentary series about the era of the America silent cinema. This series, produced by Kevin Brownlow and David Gill, was followed by the company sponsoring Thames Silents, a project undertaken by Brownlow and Gill of the restoration and screenings (in a limited number of cinemas and on television) of major films from the silent era. The two men followed Hollywood with series dedicated to leading comics of the silent era, Unknown Chaplin (1983) and Buster Keaton: A Hard Act to Follow (1987). A programme on Harold Lloyd (The Third Genius) followed in 1989. Hollywood and the Chaplin series were narrated by the actor James Mason.

Unusually for a commercial broadcaster, Thames also produced lavish versions of Gilbert and Sullivan's The Mikado and Shakespeare's A Midsummer Night's Dream.

Thames's subsidiary production company Euston Films continued to produce many of Thames's highest-profile drama contributions to ITV network programming to the end of its ITV franchise. These included Reilly, Ace of Spies (1983), Jack the Ripper (1988), Capital City (1989–1990), Selling Hitler (1991), and Anglo-Saxon Attitudes (1992).

The Bill (1984–2010) began as a one-hour series of separate stories in 1984, but from 1988 until 1998 was broadcast several times a week, usually in a 30 minute slot. Its storylines became overly melodramatic and focussed far more directly on particular police characters rather than the crime from 1998 and its return to the hour long slot and then became much more a soap opera in 2002 (when individual story titles were dropped) until coming full circle dealing predominantly with crime again in about 2007 for the last few years of its existence.

=== Programming controversies ===
In January 1985, the company made a deal with international distributors for US production company Lorimar to purchase the UK broadcasting rights for US drama Dallas, at that time transmitted on BBC1. This broke a gentlemen's agreement between the two sides not to poach each other's imported shows. Thames paid £55,000 a show compared to the £29,000 of the BBC. The deal brought condemnation from the BBC and from other ITV stations, who feared the BBC would poach their imports, pushing up prices.

The BBC planned to delay transmission of the episodes of Dallas that it already had, with the hope to broadcast them at the same time Thames broadcast its new purchases. Ultimately, pressure from several ITV companies (especially Yorkshire Television) to the IBA forced Thames to sell the series back to the BBC at a loss. Bryan Cowgill, the managing director of Thames left the company, as he believed his position was untenable since the board was unwilling to support his plans to buy the series. In October, Thames paid the BBC, via the IBA, £300,000 in compensation to make up the shortfall in additional cost for new episodes of Dallas.

The most controversial programme Thames broadcast was the documentary "Death on the Rock", part of the current affairs This Week series. The programme questioned the authority of British troops who had shot dead suspected IRA members allegedly planning a terrorist attack on a British military ceremony in Gibraltar. The documentary was regarded almost as treason by many Conservative politicians, and The Sunday Times made claims about one of the witnesses interviewed which were later found to be libellous.

The following year, in 1989, Thames ended the contract of Benny Hill, a stalwart at the station since 1969. It was believed that the comedian was dismissed because his shows were considered offensive and politically incorrect, but John Howard Davies said the decision was taken because of falling ratings, very high production costs and Hill was looking tired. The show at its peak had 21 million viewers, while the last episode had nine million.

=== Industrial relations in the Thatcher era ===
Through the early 1980s, Thames experienced a series of local disputes while management deliberately confronted contractual 'rackets', and pursued the introduction of new technologies based on operational requirements rather than precedent. For Thames's management, this was a materialist operation with a clear dimension, and to weed out unscrupulous bargaining and working practices.

In the summer of 1984 a major strike was called, this time, over Thames's management unilaterally issuing new rostering schedules (overtime payments for transmission staff), and the use of new cameras and editing equipment. There were no internal discussions of the potential savings that could be derived from new shift patterns, but there was a strong sense that union controls had to be removed before the company embarked on increasing its operations. The technicians walked for a few hours on Monday 30 July, but the station was able to return just one day as management and administration staff took over their roles.

On Monday 27 August, ACTT technicians walked out again over the new shift patterns; the strike ended on 3 September 1984, at 1p.m. after the union agreed to rostering according to need, while the management dropped plans for ending six-day working fortnights. Bryan Cowgill said: "The need for sensible change in the way we conduct our operations has been at the heart of this dispute. The outcome of a damaging and costly dispute has resulted in substantial progress towards a more realistic and effective way of working".

Over the following four weeks, further discussions took place about implementing the plans while introducing new technologies. On Wednesday 17 October, another strike was instigated, as talks failed to reach agreement. The union warned against a management-run service, as it would be a recipe for total network disturbance and a massive loss of programmes, but Thames claimed that it would be justified due to the strike being unofficial. On Monday 22 October, a management-run service started operating; the company claimed the revised schedule was popular with the viewers.

During the period of the management operated emergency schedule, viewers in the Thames Television region would see the ITV breakfast service TV-am from 6.25am until 9.25am. Once TV-am concluded, when the rest of the UK received schools programmes, Thames viewers were left with a blue screen showing their upcoming emergency schedule which would normally start at around 1.30pm and conclude around midnight. With no access to ITN News, viewers in the Thames region had to make do with short Thames News bulletins. Weekend ITV schedules for the London region were not affected by the strike, with London Weekend Television coming on air on Fridays at 5.15pm as usual.

The strike ended on 3 November 1984, after 62 film editors agreed to the new conditions, while the ACTT agreed as well to start negotiations about the introductions of new technology. Additional episodes of network productions were screened to help clear the backlog, since no outside programmes were broadcast. Thames said: "We are delighted in the outcome of the dispute which we believe is in the best interests of everyone who works at Thames".

For the Thames board, the dispute represented a huge, but necessary, cost if the company was to expand its production operations profitably. Profits at Thames dropped – from £14.1 million in 1983/84 to £8.75 million in 1984/85 – during the strike period, but were able to recover back to £14.6 million in 1985/86 just before flotation on the stock market.

During April 1988, after successfully introducing new technologies and employing more freelance staff, Thames announced the loss of 200 jobs from its permanent workforce, which followed similar action from other ITV companies in a bid to slim down their workforce and alter working practices for economic reasons. Thames made a further 297 employees redundant as part of its restructuring plan to reduce its staff to 1,500 in preparation for the 1991 ITV franchise round.

=== Area and ownership changes ===
In 1982, the Independent Broadcasting Authority decided to change the Thames franchise area, which resulted in the Bluebell Hill transmitter in north Kent, its associated relays and the main relay at Tunbridge Wells being transferred from London to the new South and South-East of England, TVS franchise, in order to serve the new region better.

In 1985, Carlton Communications had executed a failed take-over bid for Thames after Thorn EMI and British Electric Traction decided to sell their share of Thames. The deal was blocked by both Richard Dunn, chief executive of Thames, and by the IBA, which concluded 'the proposal would lead to a major change in the nature and characteristic of a viable ITV programme company'.

Carlton's owner, Michael Green, claimed that the decision left him 'bewildered' and said: 'We are surprised at the IBA's decision. I'm absolutely certain it would not have been a major change to Thames. We have always suggested that we would make absolutely sure the company would continue to be what it is at this moment in time.' The IBA said it had nothing against Carlton owning part of an ITV company, but believed 'any' single ownership of an ITV company was undesirable.

It has been said that Carlton chief executive Michael Green talked to the then Prime Minister Margaret Thatcher on the matter, which in turn may have helped to shape the Broadcasting Act 1990, which replaced the IBA with the Independent Television Commission and the change in franchise allocation procedures.

Thames finally floated on the stock market in July 1986, after being blocked by the IBA in late 1982. The shares on offer were being sold by BET and Thorn EMI, which planned to reduce their shareholding from 100% down to 28.8%. A few days afterwards speculation appeared that Carlton had attempted to buy a sizable number of shares; Michael Green, chairman of Carlton, was quoted saying "I can't possibly comment" but a Thames spokesperson pointed out "It does seem quite likely, however, no one share holder can own more than 10% of our equity so it's difficult to see what they might have in mind".

During 1989 reports appeared that talks were taking place with Carlton about an agreed merger, which resulted in no action. The flotation was not a great success, EMI and BET only managing to reduce their shares to 56.6%, with management acquiring much of the new stock. In March 1990, EMI and BET tried once again to sell off their shares in Thames, with Carlton and CLT (a Luxembourg-based media company) both in the running.

However, by October talks had stalled, with EMI and BET still controlling Thames before heading into the 1991 franchise round.

=== Franchise loss ===
On 16 October 1991, it was announced that Thames Television would lose its weekday London ITV franchise from the beginning of January 1993 as a result of losing the silent auction used to award the new licences. Thames bid £32.5 million while Carlton Television placed a bid of £43.2 million, and, since both Thames and Carlton were deemed to have passed the quality threshold, the licence was awarded to Carlton for having submitted the higher cash bid; the highest bidder in the auction, CPV-TV, was deemed to have failed on quality grounds. Some commentators consequently speculated that Thames had fallen victim to a 'government vendetta', whilst others felt that the auction had been won fairly. Carlton chose to commission the vast majority of its production content from third parties, and rent studio and broadcasting space at LWT's London Studios.

Thames was bullish after losing, since the company had made confidential contingency plans, which involved 1,000 redundancies and the closure of the Euston Road facility. The company believed it would become "Europe's most powerful independent producer and programme distributor." The Times quoted a spokesman the day after the announcement: "We can be more profitable this way, being forced out of broadcasting will save us £32.5m a year in bid payments, £30 million a year in advertising revenue taxes and about £10m in transmitter cost."

The transition of ITV companies was never smooth, but Thames's bitterness stayed until the very end. In June 1992 Carlton and the ITV network centre had backed down over its demands for Thames to relinquish its right to broadcast repeats of its own programmes on rival channels for 10 years. Thames believed Carlton's demands were unreasonable and would have forced it to drop most networked programmes on ITV during the autumn of 1992.

Thames chairman Richard Dunn publicly stated that Carlton chairman Michael Green had done everything in his power to obtain the London weekday franchise since being blocked by the IBA in 1985. Prior to its launch, Carlton was forced to advertise on LWT to promote its new programme line up, following an acrimonious High Court dispute between Thames and Carlton over the selling of rights of hundreds of films in Thames's library. Carlton settled out of court for £13.1 million.

The loss of Thames's franchise was seen as controversial by many, and highly significant by most, given Thames's history within ITV, as a long-standing franchisee in its own right, its heritage from the start of the network through its founding parents ABC and Rediffusion London, and the fact that it was one of the major contributors of content to the ITV network. The auction method used to conduct the new franchise round was a significant change from previous rounds and was brought about by the Broadcasting Act 1990. Consequently, the franchise loss became a subject of political debate, with changes brought about by the 1990 act being cited as the primary reason for an operation such as Thames being able to lose its licence to broadcast. That the then Conservative government had passed such an act caused accusations of direct responsibility to be levelled at former Prime Minister Margaret Thatcher in particular, who had presided over its creation.

Opinions varied on the matter of political motivations; some cite the documentary "Death On The Rock", which may have caused displeasure to the then government, whilst others link it to a more general ideological dislike of the way ITV had been run at the time, with over-manning, and the fact that programme production was generally limited to franchise holders (sometimes critically referred to as barriers to entry), being seen as examples of why more commercial freedom and competition was needed within the network.

== Television and movies ==
In 2021, Fremantle were licensing various Thames Television programmes to British television channels such as That's TV and Talking Pictures TV. Programmes from the Thames archive include:

=== Documentary ===
- This Is Your Life
- Attack on the Liberty (1987)
- Death on the Rock (This Week series) (1988)

=== Comedy ===
- The Benny Hill Show
- Father, Dear Father
- The Morecambe & Wise Show
- Carry On Christmas Specials
- Bless This House
- For the Love of Ada
- Let There Be Love
- Keep it in the Family
- Tripper's and Slinger's Day
- Thirty Minutes Worth
- Love Thy Neighbour
- All in Good Faith
- The Best of Tommy Cooper
- Man About the House
- Never Mind the Quality, Feel the Width
- Never the Twain
- Robin's Nest
- Room Service
- George and Mildred
- Shelley
- Mr. Bean
- Men Behaving Badly
- Full House
- Get Some In!
- Fresh Fields and French Fields
- After Henry
- Hope It Rains

=== Entertainment ===
- Des O'Connor Tonight
- Opportunity Knocks
- The Kenny Everett Video Show/Video Cassette

=== Game shows ===
- Give Us a Clue
- Name That Tune
- Strike It Lucky
- Take Your Pick!
- What's My Line?
- Whodunnit?
- Quick on the Draw
- Looks Familiar
- Whose Baby?
- Pass the Buck
- Hollywood or Bust
- Everybody's Equal

=== Drama ===
- Armchair Cinema
- Armchair Theatre
- The Avengers
- London Belongs To Me
- The Mind of Mr. J.G. Reeder
- Minder
- Mystery and Imagination
- The Rivals of Sherlock Holmes
- Rumpole of the Bailey
- Six Days of Justice
- Special Branch
- Widows
- The Sweeney
- The Bill
- The Tomorrow People

=== Factual ===
- Hollywood
- This Week
- The World at War

=== Children's ===
- Ace of Wands
- Alias the Jester
- The Beano's Dennis the Menace and Gnasher Show
- The Boy Merlin
- Button Moon
- C.A.B.
- CBTV
- Chocky
- Chorlton and the Wheelies
- Cockleshell Bay
- Count Duckula
- Creepy Crawlies
- Danger Mouse
- The Fool of the World and the Flying Ship
- Hattytown Tales
- Jamie and the Magic Torch
- Mike and Angelo
- Rainbow
- The Return of Dogtanian
- Rod, Jane and Freddy
- The Sooty Show/Learn with Sooty
- Simon in the Land of Chalk Drawings (Co-produced with FilmFair)
- Spatz
- T-Bag
- A Tale of Two Toads
- The Talking Parcel
- Time Riders
- Terry Pratchett's Truckers
- Thomas the Tank Engine and Friends (post production services on the third series)
- The Tyrant King
- Victor & Hugo: Bunglers in Crime
- The Wind in the Willows (1983 film)
- The Wind in the Willows (1984-1990 TV series)

== Branding and presentation ==
The start of Thames ITV generic ident

The final Thames ident

The first idents to be used comprised a plain screen with the words 'from Thames' written in white in the Helvetica font, and a vignette that resembled the famous ident, containing famous London landmarks. The first ident was used to signify programmes made at Rediffusion's old studios at Adastral House, the latter, shows that came from ABC's former Teddington Studios. Some programmes recorded at Teddington, such as some episodes of the 1969 series of "Callan" did, however, use the "from Thames" caption, indicating that they may have been edited at Adastral House rather than Teddington. Both of the company's logos were accompanied by a fanfare called Salute to Thames, composed by Johnny Hawksworth.

With the introduction of colour, the ident was remodelled on the vignette, this time using photographs rather than drawings. This ident was designed by agency Minale Tattersfield. It was originally shot by stop-frame animation on 16 mm film, then shot again on 35 mm film in 1976 and finally digitised on computer in 1984. All of these animations featured the same design, which consisted of the skyline slowly rolling up from the River Thames along with the logo, which was reflected briefly on the water and then quickly faded to its static position at the centre of the ident.

The ident was finally withdrawn in July 1989, when Thames celebrated its 21st anniversary. The revised ident retained the London landmarks but contained them in a blue and orange triangle, pointing downwards, with three wavy blue lines to represent the river and the words 'Thames XXI' in the orange part of the triangle and it was this logo which was used on the first ITV branding idents on 4 September 1989.

A new ident was launched on 3 September 1990, featuring a redesigned triangle logo containing Big Ben, the British Telecom Tower, the dome of St Paul's Cathedral and the Tower Bridge. Initially, this ident, featuring a new station theme composed by Anthony and Gaynor Sadler, was used only before local programmes; a modified ITV generic ident featuring this new logo was used for networked shows. Once Thames learned it was to lose its franchise to Carlton, the ITV-branded ident was dropped in favour of the local ident which was used throughout during most broadcast hours (except for overnights) from 4 November 1991 until 31 December 1992.

== From 1992 ==
Thames Television was involved in an attempt to win the new Channel 5 licence when it was first advertised in early 1992. Thames was the main shareholder in a consortium (alongside Warner Bros. Television and others) called Channel Five Holdings. The consortium became the only bidder for the licence in December 1992 after two other groups dropped out. However, the ITC rejected the bid as a result of concerns about its business plan and investor backing. The deadline was therefore extended twice before the licence was handed to Channel 5 Broadcasting Limited.

On 1 November 1992, a new satellite station called UK Gold was launched as a joint venture between Thames and BBC Enterprises, to show repeats of shows from both broadcasters. Thames's share was bought out by Flextech in 1996.

After its loss of the ITV franchise on 31 December 1992, Thames continued as an independent production company for another ten years. This Is Your Life ran on ITV for 25 years until 1994 when the network cancelled it and the series was recommissioned by the BBC, with Thames continuing to produce it. The corporation ended the series in 2003. (Note: It was revived once again, this time by ITV Productions and SMG Productions for ITV in 2007, hosted by Sir Trevor McDonald, but failed after one series.) The Bill continued on ITV until 2010.

Following the loss of Thames's franchise, the Euston Road base of Thames was sold off and demolished. The site of the studios is currently occupied by Triton Square and the registered headquarters of the British operation of Spanish bank Santander. The studios at Teddington were sold to a management buy-out team and were part of the Pinewood Group, owners of both Pinewood and Shepperton Studios.

Final logo used between 2003 and 2006, when it was a separate entity of Talkback Thames

Thames Television was acquired by Pearson Television on 23 April 1993. Pearson Television was itself sold by Pearson plc to CLT-UFA in 2000, thus merging to become the RTL Group, and rebranded as FremantleMedia in 2001. In 2003, Thames Television was merged with another FremantleMedia subsidiary, Talkback (founded by comedians Mel Smith and Griff Rhys Jones in 1981), to form Talkback Thames. Despite the merger, Thames continued as a separate entity and its own logo to be used at the end of the label's entertainment and drama productions until 2006. That subsidiary was split into four new production companies at the start of 2012, with the new Thames producing entertainment programming until the start of 2025, when the re-merging of it and Talkback to form Talkback Thames.

== Culture ==
Thames is often quoted as a prime example of a commercial public-service broadcaster with shows covering all aspects of the spectrum and the largest producer in the network. Its shows achieved massive audiences and are still remembered many years later. This is sometimes attributed to the culture of the company, which could be claimed to be a continuation of that at ABC. That station was more highly regarded by the ITA (amongst others) than Rediffusion whose programming was seen as downmarket and whose management-style was viewed as high-handed. The two companies allowed Thames independence (although in later years there were accusations that they both treated the company as a cash cow).

The children's department also spawned the independent production company Tetra Films, which would later revive some classic Thames children's programmes for ITV – The Tomorrow People (1992–5, in association with Thames-owned Reeves Entertainment for ITV and Nickelodeon) and Rainbow (1994–96, for HTV) – along with a range of original film and television productions.

== See also ==
- Thames (2012-2025)
- Euston Films
- Talkback Thames
- Thames Silents
- Associated-Rediffusion
- ABC Weekend TV
- Carlton Television
- London Weekend Television
- ITV (TV network)
- History of ITV

== Notes ==
ITV regional service
Preceded by Rediffusion	London (weekdays); 30 July 1968 – 31 December 1992	Succeeded by Carlton Television
