= Unknown Chaplin =

- Genre: Documentary series
- Written by: Kevin Brownlow; David Gill
- Directed by: Kevin Brownlow; David Gill
- Presented by: James Mason
- Starring: Sydney Chaplin; Virginia Cherrill; Jackie Coogan; Lita Grey; Georgia Hale; Dean Riesner
- Composer: Carl Davis
- Country of origin: United Kingdom
- Original language: English
- No. of series: 1
- No. of episodes: 3

Production
- Running time: 52 minutes (including commercials)
- Production company: Thames Television

Original release
- Network: ITV
- Release: 5 January – 19 January 1983

Unknown Chaplin is a three-part 1983 British documentary series about the career and methods of the silent film luminary Charlie Chaplin, using previously unseen film for illustration. The series consist of three episodes, with title My Happiest Years, The Great Director and Hidden Treasures.

The film was directed and written by film historians Kevin Brownlow and David Gill. They were granted access to unseen material from Chaplin's private film archive by his widow Oona O'Neil Chaplin. Episode one of the series was also based on a large cache of pirated outtakes from the Mutual Film Corporation period of Chaplin's career (1916-1917), made available by the film collector Raymond Rohauer. The documentary also includes interviews with Chaplin's second wife Lita Grey, his son Sydney Earl Chaplin, and his surviving co-stars Jackie Coogan, Dean Riesner, Georgia Hale, and Virginia Cherrill.

The series gives unparalleled insight into Chaplin's working methods and filmmaking techniques. In particular, the Mutual outtakes (which Chaplin ordered destroyed due to content inappropriate for the time) show his painstaking approach to developing comedic and dramatic ideas on film, examined in what director Brownlow described as an "archaeology of the cinema". Also shown for the first time are completed scenes Chaplin cut from his classic feature films The Circus, City Lights, and Modern Times, and an enigmatic sequence from an abandoned film entitled The Professor from 1919. The program also includes footage of Georgia Hale as the flower girl in City Lights during a period when Chaplin had fired Cherrill, and rare home movies of Chaplin, including a remarkable behind-the-scenes private film of him at work on City Lights.

The series exhibits various outtakes of Chaplin laughing or getting angry when scenes go awry. Edna Purviance corpses in several clips, and in one she plays a joke on another actress during filming. A compilation of alternate takes illustrates how Chaplin slowly developed the story line of The Immigrant.

The film was narrated by James Mason, and original music was scored and conducted by Carl Davis, largely based on themes composed by Chaplin himself. PBS distributed the series in the United States in 1986 as part of the series American Masters. In the 2005 DVD release of the series, Brownlow relates some of Unknown Chaplin's backstory. The series was rereleased on DVD in November 2024. In 2010, Brownlow published a book on the making of the documentary titled The Search for Charlie Chaplin.
