= Hollywood (British TV series) =

1980 documentary series

- Thames Video Collection VHS 1 of 13
- Genre: Documentary
- Written by: Kevin Brownlow; David Gill
- Directed by: Kevin Brownlow; David Gill
- Narrated by: James Mason
- Theme music composer: Carl Davis
- Composer: Carl Davis
- Country of origin: United Kingdom
- Original language: English
- No. of episodes: 13

Production
- Producers: Kevin Brownlow; David Gill
- Editors: Dan Carter; Trevor Waite; Oscar Webb
- Running time: 49-52min per episode (ex. commercials), ~11h15m57s in total
- Production company: Thames Television

Original release
- Network: ITV
- Release: January 8 – April 1, 1980

Hollywood (also known as Hollywood: A Celebration of the American Silent Film) is a British television documentary miniseries produced by Thames Television and originally broadcast on ITV in 1980. Written and directed by film historians Kevin Brownlow and David Gill, it explored the establishment and development of the Hollywood studios and their cultural impact during the silent film era of the 1910s and 1920s. At the 1981 BAFTA TV Awards, the series won for Best Original Television Music and was nominated for Best Factual Series, Best Film Editing and Best Graphics.

The series has seldom been released on home video formats, apparently due to the complexity of obtaining home video rights to all of the film clips used. It is available on the Internet Archive.

In 1995, Brownlow and Gill produced the followup series, Cinema Europe: The Other Hollywood, which explores the rise of the silent film industry in Sweden, Germany, France and Great Britain.

== Synopsis ==
The series consists of 13 50-minute episodes, with each episode dealing with a specific aspect of Hollywood history. The actor James Mason, an enthusiast of the period, supplied the narration while a lilting and expressive score was contributed by Carl Davis.

Technical quality was an important aspect of the production. Silent films had often been screened on television from poor-quality copies running at an inaccurate speed, usually accompanied by honky tonk piano music. Hollywood used silent film clips sourced from the best available material, shown at their original running speed via a polygonal prism telecine, and with an orchestral score, giving viewers a chance to see what they originally looked and sounded like. For instance, the first episode features a clip of Life of an American Fireman, produced in 1903 with the aforementioned stereotypical poor quality print and music and then compares that with a clip of The Fire Brigade, produced over two decades later in 1926, in a high quality print run at the proper speed with full orchestral accompaniment.

The producers filmed the recollections of many of the period's surviving participants, and illustrated their interviews with scenes from their various films, as well as production still photographs, and historical photographs of the Los Angeles environs. Some of these interviews are notable for being among the only filmed interviews given by their subjects.

== Participants ==
Among the notable people who contributed interviews were:

- Actors – Mary Astor, Eleanor Boardman, Louise Brooks, Olive Carey, Iron Eyes Cody, Jackie Coogan, Dolores Costello, Viola Dana, Douglas Fairbanks, Jr., Janet Gaynor, Leatrice Joy, Lillian Gish, Bessie Love, Ben Lyon, Marion Mack, Tim McCoy, Colleen Moore, Charles 'Buddy' Rogers, Gloria Swanson, Blanche Sweet, John Wayne, Eva von Berne, and Lois Wilson.
- Directors – Dorothy Arzner, Clarence Brown, Karl Brown, Frank Capra, George Cukor, Allan Dwan, Byron Haskin, Henry Hathaway, Henry King, Lewis Milestone, Hal Roach, Albert S. Rogell, King Vidor, and William Wyler.

Also interviewed were choreographer Agnes de Mille, writer Anita Loos, writer Adela Rogers St. Johns, press agent/writer Cedric Belfrage, organist Gaylord Carter, cinematographers George J. Folsey, Lee Garmes, and Paul Ivano, writer Jesse L. Lasky, Jr., special effects artist A. Arnold Gillespie, Lord Mountbatten, agent Paul Kohner, producer/writer Samuel Marx, editors William Hornbeck and Grant Whytock, property man Lefty Hough, stuntmen Bob Rose, Yakima Canutt, Paul Malvern, and Harvey Parry, Rudolph Valentino's brother Alberto Valentino, Valerie von Stroheim, and English set designer Laurence Irving.

== Episodes ==
1. "Pioneers" – The evolution of film from penny arcade curiosity to art form, from what was considered the first plot-driven film, The Great Train Robbery, through to The Birth of a Nation, films showing the power of the medium. Early Technicolor footage, along with other color technologies, are also featured. Interviews include Lillian Gish, Jackie Coogan and King Vidor.
2. "In the Beginning" – Hollywood is transformed from a peaceful village with dusty streets and lemon groves to the birthplace of the industry in California. Silent film transcends international boundaries to become a worldwide phenomenon. Interviews include Henry King, Agnes de Mille, and Lillian Gish.
3. "Single Beds and Double Standards" – Fast success in Hollywood brings a cavalier party lifestyle, which led to shocking scandals such as Roscoe "Fatty" Arbuckle's trial and subsequent acquittal for manslaughter. To tone down the image of Hollywood and curtail films with footage unsuitable to all audiences, Will H. Hays is appointed and introduces Hollywood's self regulated Production Code, which would be enforced well into the 1960s, while filmmakers still found creative ways to present 'adult' situations. Interviews include King Vidor and Gloria Swanson.
4. "Hollywood Goes to War" – The outbreak of World War I provides Hollywood with a successful source for plots and profits. Peacetime curtails the release of war movies, until the release of King Vidor's The Big Parade in 1925. Wings (1927) earns the first Academy Award for Best Picture. As movies transition to sound, Universal releases Lewis Milestone's All Quiet on the Western Front, showing the German side of the conflict, becoming a powerful statement of war by the generation that fought it. Interviews include Douglas Fairbanks, Jr., King Vidor, Blanche Sweet and Lillian Gish.
5. "Hazard of the Game" – Silent films are often remembered for slapstick gags and dangerous stunts. Stuntmen took anonymous credit for very little pay and could not reveal their involvement. Stuntmen Yakima Canutt, Harvey Parry, Bob Rose and Paul Malvern tell hair-raising and humorous stories, and reveal the secrets behind many famous stunts.
6. "Swanson & Valentino" – Two of the great romantic legends of the silent screen are profiled. Rudolph Valentino's on-screen persona is remarkably different from his real personal life, as recounted by his brother, Alberto, and Gloria Swanson recalls her meteoric rise – and fall – with remarkable candor.
7. "Autocrats" – Two of Hollywood's greatest directors, Cecil B. DeMille and Erich von Stroheim. One worked with the Hollywood system, the other against it. DeMille's pictures, lavish in detail and cost, made his studio a fortune, while Von Stroheim's similar ways, albeit to excess in footage and expense, resulted in films that were often either excessively cut by the studios or never released, leading to him being fired on several occasions. Interviews include Agnes DeMille, Gloria Swanson, Allen Dwan, and Henry King.
8. "Comedy – A Serious Business" – Hollywood learned very early how to make people laugh. Comedy was king, and battling for the throne were stars like Harold Lloyd, Buster Keaton, Harry Langdon and Charlie Chaplin. In a purely visual medium, their comedy was a work of genius. Interviews include Hal Roach, Sr., Jackie Coogan, Buster Keaton (archival) and Harold Lloyd (archival.)
9. "Out West" – 'The Old West' was still in existence in the silent days. Old cowboys and outlaws relived their youth, and got paid for doing it, by working in films. The 'western craze' really begins with stars like William S. Hart, Harry Carey and Tom Mix. Interviews include Yakima Canutt, Colonel Tim McCoy, Harvey Parry and John Wayne.
10. "The Man with the Megaphone" – Silent film directors were flamboyant pioneers, making up their technique as they went along. Filming 'indoor' sets on open outdoor lots and combating the elements, communicating with actors in spite of overwhelming distraction and deafening noise, directors (male and female) fashion great films out of chaos and confusion. Interviews include Bessie Love, Janet Gaynor and King Vidor.
11. "Trick of the Light" – Skilled cameramen had the ability to turn an actress into a screen goddess, and were valuable assets to studios and stars. With the aid of art directors, they achieved some of the most amazing and dangerous sequences captured on film, pioneering photography effects used through the remainder of the 20th century. Interviews include William Wyler and Lillian Gish.
12. "Star Treatment" – Producers discovered the effect of 'star power' on their box office bottom line. Creating Hollywood stars becomes its own industry, resulting in the Hollywood Star System, from which came Clara Bow, Greta Garbo, and John Gilbert, successor to Rudolph Valentino as "The Great Lover". But as easily as they made them, studios could break them. Interviews include Charles "Buddy" Rogers, Louise Brooks and King Vidor.
13. "End of an Era" – Silent films had universal appeal, simply by replacing intertitles and dialogue cards for the foreign markets. Sound film was experimented with in many forms since the 1890s, but did not become commercially successful until The Jazz Singer in 1927. Hollywood movie making was transformed and ultimately shattered, taking the careers of many silent film stars, directors and producers with it, victims of the emerging technology. Interviews include Lillian Gish, Mary Astor, Janet Gaynor, George Cukor and Frank Capra, Sr.

== Films featured in Hollywood ==
- The Dickson Experimental Sound Film (1894)
- Edison Kinetoscopic Record of a Sneeze (1894)
- Life of an American Fireman (1903)
- The Great Train Robbery (1903)
- Le Spectre rouge/The Red Spectre (1907)
- The Curtain Pole (1909)
- Faithful (1910)
- The Girl and Her Trust (1912)
- A Beast at Bay (1912)
- Queen Elizabeth (1912)
- An Unseen Enemy (1912)
- The Musketeers of Pig Alley (1912)
- Quo Vadis? (1913)
- Suspense (1913)
- The Reformers or, The Lost Art of Minding One's Business (1913)
- Making a Living (1914)
- The Squaw Man (1914)
- The Massacre (1914)
- Judith of Bethulia (1914)
- The Birth of a Nation (1915)
- The Juggernaut (1915)
- Mabel and Fatty Viewing the World's Fair at San Francisco (1915)
- The Cheat (1915)
- Fatty and Mabel Adrift (1916)
- A Movie Star (1916)
- He Did and He Didn't (1916)
- The Extra Man and the Milk-Fed Lion (1916)
- Hell's Hinges (1916)
- Civilization (1916)
- The Children in the House (1916)
- The Floorwalker (1916)
- Intolerance: Love's Struggle Throughout the Ages (1916)
- Tom's Strategy (1916)
- The Pawnshop (1916)
- The Return of Draw Egan (1916)
- Luke's Movie Muddle (1916)
- The Rink (1916)
- Joan the Woman (1916)
- Teddy at the Throttle (1917)
- Straight Shooting (1917)
- Coney Island (1917)
- The Pullman Bride (1917)
- Blue Jeans (1917)
- Stella Maris (1918)
- My Four Years in Germany (1918)
- Hearts of the World (1918)
- The Lady of the Dugout (1918)
- The Bond (1918)
- The Heart of Humanity (1918)
- Daddy-Long-Legs (1919)
- Blind Husbands (1919)
- Eyes of Youth (1919)
- Male and Female (1919)
- Heart o' the Hills (1919)
- Suds (1920)
- Why Change Your Wife? (1920)
- One Week (1920)
- Way Down East (1920)
- Life of the Party (1920)
- The Kid (1921)
- Forbidden Fruit (1921)
- The Four Horsemen of the Apocalypse (1921)
- Dream Street (1921)
- The Three Musketeers (1921)
- Little Lord Fauntleroy (1921)
- Never Weaken (1921)
- The Sheik (1921)
- Affairs of Anatol (1921)
- Foolish Wives (1922)
- Manslaughter (1922)
- Robin Hood (1922)
- Down to the Sea in Ships (1922)
- Around the World in Eighteen Days (1922)
- The Covered Wagon (1923)
- Safety Last! (1923)
- Merry-Go-Round (1923)
- The Hunchback of Notre Dame (1923)
- Scaramouche (1923)
- Zaza (1923)
- The Extra Girl (1923)
- Flaming Youth (1923)
- Our Hospitality (1923)
- The Ten Commandments (1923)
- The Thief of Bagdad (1924)
- The Enchanted College (1924)
- Manhandled (1924)
- Monsieur Beaucaire (1924)
- The Iron Horse (1924)
- Hot Water (1924)
- A Sainted Devil (1924)
- Greed (1924)
- Seven Chances (1925)
- The Merry Widow (1925)
- Little Annie Rooney (1925)
- The King on Main Street (1925)
- The Big Parade (1925)
- The Eagle (1925)
- Stage Struck (1925)
- The Plastic Age (1925)
- Tumbleweeds (1925)
- Ben-Hur: A Tale of the Christ (1925)
- Mare Nostrum (1926)
- Dancing Mothers (1926)
- The Black Pirate (1926)
- Ella Cinders (1926)
- The Devil Horse (1926)
- The Son of the Sheik (1926)
- Mantrap (1926)
- Don Juan (1926)
- The Strong Man (1926)
- The Temptress (1926)
- The Winning of Barbara Worth (1926)
- The Great K & A Train Robbery (1926)
- What Price Glory? (1926)
- Old Ironsides (1926)
- The Fire Brigade (1926)
- The General (1926)
- Flesh and the Devil (1926)
- Play Safe (1927)
- It (1927)
- The Love of Sunya (1927)
- The Beloved Rogue (1927)
- The King of Kings (1927)
- Children of Divorce (1927)
- Wings (1927)
- A Kiss from Mary Pickford (1927)
- Sunrise: A Song of Two Humans (1927)
- The Jazz Singer (1927)
- Man, Woman and Sin (1927)
- The Gaucho (1927)
- Love (1927)
- Sadie Thompson (1927)
- Four Sons (1928)
- The Crowd (1928)
- The Trail of '98 (1928)
- Steamboat Bill, Jr. (1928)
- Lights of New York (1928)
- Lilac Time (1928)
- The Mysterious Lady (1928)
- The Wind (1928)
- The Singing Fool (1928)
- The Wedding March (1928)
- Noah's Ark (1928)
- Show People (1928)
- A Woman of Affairs (1928)
- Queen Kelly (1929)
- The Iron Mask (1929)
- Big Business (1929)
- The Black Watch (1929)
- The Hollywood Revue of 1929 (1929)
- His Glorious Night (1929)
- The Saturday Night Kid (1929)
- The Sky Hawk (1929)
- Peacock Alley (1930)
- Anna Christie (1930)
- Redemption (1930)
- Show Girl in Hollywood (1930)
- All Quiet on the Western Front (1930)
- The Viking (1931)
- Hoop-La (1933)
- Queen Christina (1933)
- Sunset Boulevard (1950)
- The Searchers (1956)

== Home media ==
In North America, the series was released in 1990 by HBO Video on VHS and laserdisc.
