= David Gill (film historian) =

British film historian

David Ian Gill (9 June 1928 – 28 September 1997) was a British film historian, preservationist and documentarian who documented the history of motion pictures and helped restore many early, silent films.

He was born in Papua New Guinea, the son of Cecil Gill, a missionary doctor. His uncle was the sculptor Eric Gill. The family returned to England in 1933 where Gill attended the Belmont Abbey School, Hereford.

Gill died at his home in Huntingdon, England, aged 69, after a heart attack.

== Career ==
Gill trained as a dancer and joined Britain's Sadler's Wells Theatre Ballet in 1946, appearing in The Sleeping Princess, which opened in Covent Garden that year. In 1953, he married dancer Pauline Wadsworth, who later taught at The Royal Ballet School.

Gill left ballet in 1955 to work in television, producing his mime play, The Way of the Cross, for the BBC before joining Associated-Rediffusion as an editor. As a result of that year's franchise changes, he moved to Thames Television in 1968, working mainly on news and documentaries for, amongst others, the Today and This Week programmes.

Whilst at Thames, he met film historian Kevin Brownlow, with whom he was to form Photoplay Productions and work as co-director and producer on several silent film-related projects. These included the Hollywood (1980) series and a restoration of Abel Gance's epic Napoléon, which was performed in 1980 at the Empire, Leicester Square. Brownlow and Gill formed their own company, Photoplay Productions in 1990, in order to continue their restoration work and documentaries on silent cinema. Among the 25 films they restored are Ben-Hur: A Tale of the Christ, The Phantom of the Opera, The Thief of Bagdad and The Four Horsemen of the Apocalypse.

Gill's unexpected death, in September 1997, came as he was planning a series of archival films on dance and working on Nosferatu (1922), the 1997 entry in the Channel 4 Silents series, which was to take place at the Royal Festival Hall later in the year.

== Filmography ==
=== Silent feature films ===
- D. W. Griffith's The Birth of a Nation (restoration)
- Charlie Chaplin's The Gold Rush (restoration)
- The Student Prince in Old Heidelberg (1927) (producer) (1986 alternate version)
- The Wind (1928) (producer) (restored version)
- The Blot (1921) (producer) (restored version)

=== Documentaries ===
- Harold Lloyd: The Third Genius (TV documentary 1989)
- Cinema Europe: The Other Hollywood (TV series, 1995, co-producer)
- D. W. Griffith: Father of Film (1993) (producer)
- American Masters (producer) (1 episode, 1989)
- Buster Keaton: A Hard Act to Follow (1987) (TV) (producer)
- Unknown Chaplin (1983 TV series, co-producer)
- Hollywood (1980 TV series, co-producer)
- Till I End My Song, a documentary on the River Thames. Nominated for Emmy and British film awards in 1968.

His documentaries on Vietnam, South Africa, and Northern Ireland were broadcast on the British series This Week.

== Articles ==
- David Gill, The Birth of a Nation. Orphan or Pariah? Griffithiana, no. 60/61, October 1997, pp. 17–29 (film restoration)
