= Some Blondes Are Dangerous =

1937 American drama film

- Theatrical release poster
- Directed by: Milton Carruth
- Screenplay by: Lester Cole
- Based on: Iron Man by W. R. Burnett
- Produced by: E. M. Asher
- Starring: Noah Beery Jr.; William Gargan; Nan Grey; Dorothea Kent; Roland Drew; Lew Kelly; Polly Rowles; John Butler
- Cinematography: George Robinson
- Edited by: Frank Gross
- Production company: Universal Pictures
- Distributed by: Universal Pictures
- Release date: November 1, 1937
- Running time: 65 minutes
- Country: United States
- Language: English

Some Blondes Are Dangerous is a 1937 American drama film directed by Milton Carruth and written by Lester Cole. It is based on the 1930 novel Iron Man by W. R. Burnett. The film stars Noah Beery Jr., William Gargan, Nan Grey, Dorothea Kent, Roland Drew, Lew Kelly, Polly Rowles and John Butler. The film was released on November 1, 1937, by Universal Pictures.

== Plot ==
A boxer hooks up with a suspicious blonde even though he is advised not to.

== Cast ==
- Noah Beery Jr. as Bud Mason
- William Gargan as George Regan
- Nan Grey as Judy Williams
- Dorothea Kent as Rose Whitney
- Roland Drew as Paul Lewis
- Lew Kelly as Jeff
- Polly Rowles as Mrs. Lewis
- John Butler as McNeil
- Eddie Roberts as Rattler O'Keefe
- Edwin Stanley as Edward Reilly
- Fred Kohler Jr. as Fighter
- Joe Smallwood as Spike
- Max Wagner as Ruby Hall
- Louis Natheaux as Hymie Mandle
- Walter Friedman as Dink Pappas
- Charles Murphy as Mug

== Production ==
This picture is one of very few in which Noah Beery Jr., nephew of Wallace Beery, is top-billed as the lead rather than a supporting player. Along with almost countless other roles across the decades, Noah Beery Jr. later played James Garner's character's father "Rocky" in the 1970s television series The Rockford Files.
