= Cipher Bureau =

Cipher Bureau may refer to:

- Cipher Bureau (United States), a.k.a. Black Chamber (1919–1929), the US government's first peacetime cryptanalytic organization
- Cipher Bureau (Poland) (Biuro Szyfrów), the interwar Polish unit charged with signals intelligence, cryptography and cryptanalysis that broke the German cipher machine Enigma
- Cipher Bureau (film), a 1938 American film
