= Eleodoro Marenco =

Argentine artist

Eleodoro Ergasto Marenco
- Born: July 13, 1914; Buenos Aires, Argentina
- Died: June 17, 1996 (aged 81); Buenos Aires, Argentina
- Known for: Painting

Eleodoro Ergasto Marenco (July 13, 1914 – June 17, 1996) was an Argentine artist, best known for his paintings on Argentine gauchos, horses, and horsemen. He illustrated many books, including notable editions of many important books from classical gaucho literature. He was appointed as costume advisor in the film Way of a Gaucho. A public square in Buenos Aires bears his name.
