= Breezing Home =

1937 film

- Film poster
- Directed by: Milton Carruth
- Written by: Charles Grayson; Finley Peter Dunne; Philip Dunne
- Produced by: Edmund Grainger
- Starring: Binnie Barnes; William Gargan; Wendy Barrie
- Cinematography: Gilbert Warrenton
- Edited by: Otis Garrett
- Music by: Score: Charles Previn; Songs: Jimmy McHugh (music); Harold Adamson (lyrics)
- Production company: Universal Pictures
- Distributed by: Universal Pictures
- Release date: February 1, 1937
- Running time: 64 minutes
- Country: United States
- Language: English

Breezing Home is a 1937 American drama film directed by Milton Carruth and starring Binnie Barnes, William Gargan, and Wendy Barrie. It was produced and distributed by Universal Pictures.

== Plot ==
A racehorse trainer, Steve Rowan, is forced to sell one of his favorites, Galaxy, to a crooked bookie, Joe Montgomery. With the gambler unable to get directly involved, Gloria Lee, who is Joe's girlfriend, acts as the horse's official new owner when Galaxy is entered in a race.

Steve is still the trainer, but quits after Joe fixes the race by bribing a jockey to disrupt Galaxy's race. Steve leaves for California, where wealthy stable owner Henrietta Fairfax hires him to train Memento, her own top thoroughbred.

Gloria's guilt results in her following Steve out west. She needs to borrow $1,000 to race Galaxy, but is banished from the track when officials discover that Joe gave her the money. Henrietta is in love with Steve but realizes he has feeling for Gloria, permitting him to train Galaxy on her behalf in an upcoming stakes race, which Galaxy wins.

== Main cast ==
- Binnie Barnes as Henrietta Fairfax
- William Gargan as Steve Rowan
- Wendy Barrie as Gloria Lee
- Raymond Walburn as Clint Evans
- Alma Kruger as Mrs. Evans
- Alan Baxter as Joe Montgomery
- Willie Best as Speed
- Michael Loring as Eddie

== See also ==
- List of films about horses
- List of films about horse racing

== Bibliography ==
- Palmer, Scott (1998). British Film Actors' Credits, 1895–1987. Jefferson, NC: McFarland. ISBN 978-0-89950-316-5.
