= Dorothea Kent =

American actress (1916–1990)

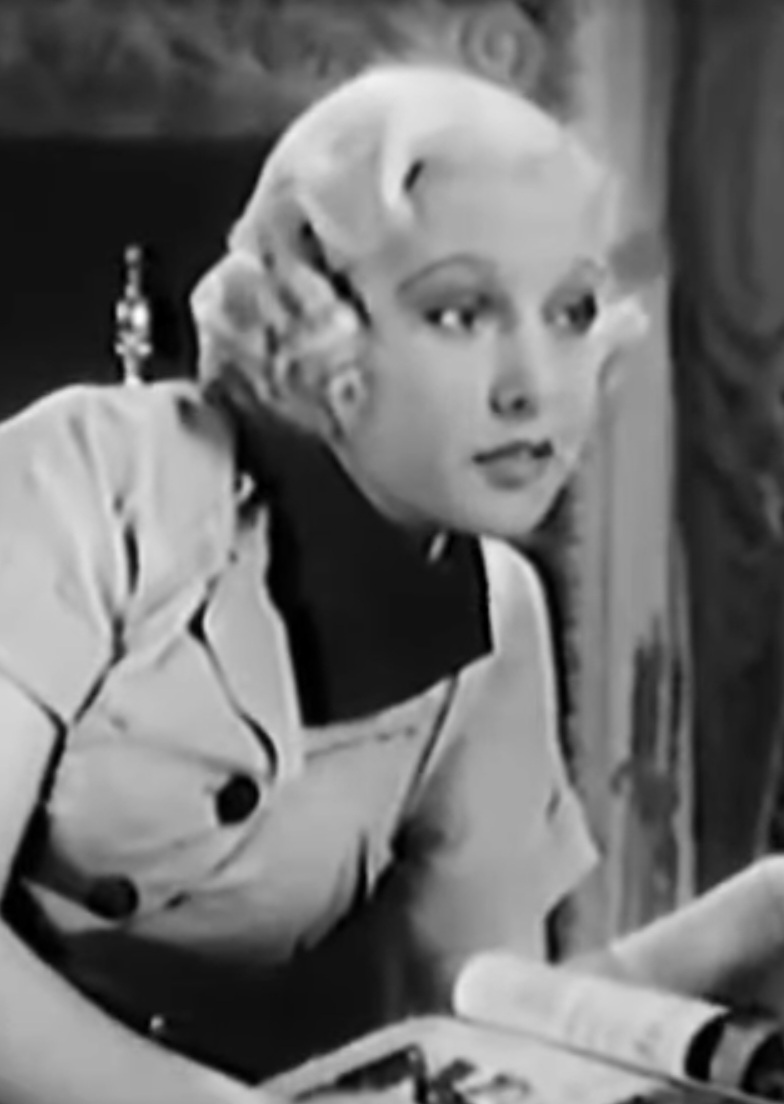
- Kent in August Weekend (1936)
- Born: Dorothea Jane Schaeffer; June 6, 1916; St. Joseph, Missouri, U.S.
- Died: December 10, 1990 (aged 74); Burbank, California, U.S.
- Resting place: San Fernando Mission Cemetery
- Occupation: Actress
- Years active: 1935–1948
- Spouses: Lester Arthur Corson (m. 1934, divorced) Kenneth Ortis Baker (m. 1941, divorced)

Dorothea Kent (born Dorothea Jane Schaeffer; June 6, 1916 – December 10, 1990) was an American film actress. She appeared in more than 40 films between 1935 and 1948. A former model, she often played dumb sidekicks of the heroine, and rarely played the lead. In addition to her credited roles, she also had roles in six other films, including her last role in the 1948 film The Babe Ruth Story.

The daughter of Mr. and Mrs. Anthony Schaeffer, Kent was born Dorothea Jane Schaeffer in Missouri on June 6, 1916, and died in Burbank, California, on December 10, 1990, from cancer. She was buried at the San Fernando Mission Cemetery.

== Partial filmography ==
- George White's Scandals (1934) - Dancer (uncredited)
- Horses' Collars (1935, Short) - Nell Higginbottom
- The Little Big Top (1935, Short)
- Hayseed Romance (1935, Short) - Molly
- Tars and Stripes (1935, Short) - Mack's Girlfriend
- It Never Rains (1935, Short)
- The E-Flat Man (1935, Short) - Elmer's Girl
- Knockout Drops (1935, Short)
- August Weekend (1936) - Midge Washburne (uncredited)
- The Luckiest Girl in the World (1936) - Mary
- Flying Hostess (1936) - Party Girl (uncredited)
- More Than a Secretary (1936) - Maizie West
- As Good as Married (1937) - Poochie
- Carnival Queen (1937) - Marion Prescott
- A Girl with Ideas (1937) - Isabelle Foster
- Some Blondes Are Dangerous (1937) - Rose Whitney
- Prescription for Romance (1937) - Lola Carroll
- Goodbye Broadway (1938) - Jeanne Carlyle
- Young Fugitives (1938) - Meg
- Having Wonderful Time (1938) - Maxine
- Youth Takes a Fling (1938) - Jean
- The Last Express (1938) - Amy Arden
- Strange Faces (1938) - Maggie Moore
- Risky Business (1939) - Mary Dexter
- She Married a Cop (1939) - Mabel Dunne
- Million Dollar Legs (1939) - Susie Quinn
- Danger Ahead (1940) - Genevieve
- Flight Angels (1940) - Mabel
- Cross-Country Romance (1940) - Millie
- They Drive by Night (1940) - Sue (uncredited)
- No, No, Nanette (1940) - Betty
- It Started with Eve (1941) - Jackie Donovan
- Call of the Canyon (1942) - Jane Oakley
- King of the Cowboys (1943) - Ruby Smith
- Stage Door Canteen (1943) - Mamie - Jersey's Girl
- Pin Up Girl (1944) - Kay
- Army Wives (1944) - Louise
- Carolina Blues (1944) - Maisie (uncredited)
- Bring On the Girls (1945) - Myrtle (uncredited)
- Ten Cents a Dance (1945) - Sadie (uncredited)
- The Missing Lady (1946) - Jennie Delaney
- Behind the Mask (1946) - Jennie Delaney
- It Happened on 5th Avenue (1947) - Margie Temple
- The Babe Ruth Story (1948) - Blonde (uncredited)
