= The Showdown (1940 film) =

1940 film

- Theatrical release poster
- Directed by: Howard Bretherton
- Screenplay by: Donald Kusel; Harold Daniel Kusel
- Story by: Jack Jungmeyer
- Produced by: Harry Sherman
- Starring: William Boyd; Russell Hayden; Britt Wood; Morris Ankrum; Jan Clayton; Wright Kramer; Donald Kirke
- Cinematography: Russell Harlan
- Edited by: Carroll Lewis
- Music by: John Leipold
- Production company: Harry Sherman Productions
- Distributed by: Paramount Pictures
- Release date: March 8, 1940
- Running time: 65 minutes
- Country: United States
- Language: English

The Showdown is a 1940 American Western film directed by Howard Bretherton, written by Donald Kusel and Harold Daniel Kusel, and starring William Boyd, Russell Hayden, Britt Wood, Morris Ankrum, Jan Clayton, Wright Kramer and Donald Kirke. It was released on March 8, 1940, by Paramount Pictures.

== Plot ==
A Baron from Europe is out to steal some race horses, rename them and then race them from the Colonel's ranch. Hoppy becomes suspicious of the Baron, so when he wins money from him at poker, he marks the bills. Then gets robbed, but when the money appears it is in the Baron's hands.

== Cast ==
- William Boyd as Hopalong Cassidy
- Russell Hayden as Lucky Jenkins
- Britt Wood as Speedy McGinnis
- Morris Ankrum as Baron Rendor
- Jan Clayton as Sue Willard
- Wright Kramer as Colonel Rufe White
- Donald Kirke as Harry Cole
- Roy Barcroft as Bowman
- Eddie Dean as The Marshal
- Kermit Maynard as Henchman Johnson
- Walter Shumway as Henchman Snell
- The King's Men as Singing Cowhands
