= Sunset Trail =

1939 film

- Theatrical release poster
- Directed by: Lesley Selander
- Screenplay by: Norman Houston
- Produced by: Harry Sherman
- Starring: William Boyd; George "Gabby" Hayes; Russell Hayden; Charlotte Wynters; Jan Clayton; Robert Fiske; Kenneth Harlan
- Cinematography: Russell Harlan
- Edited by: Robert B. Warwick Jr.
- Music by: Gerard Carbonara
- Production company: Harry Sherman Productions
- Distributed by: Paramount Pictures
- Release date: February 24, 1939
- Running time: 69 minutes
- Country: United States
- Language: English

Sunset Trail is a 1939 American Western film directed by Lesley Selander, written by Norman Houston, and starring William Boyd, George "Gabby" Hayes, Russell Hayden, Charlotte Wynters, Jan Clayton, Robert Fiske and Kenneth Harlan. It was released on February 24, 1939, by Paramount Pictures.

== Plot ==
Widow Ann Marsh (Charlotte Wynters), and her daughter Dorrie (Jan Clayton) return to Silver City and open a dude ranch after husband is killed and his $30,000 is missing. Widow Marsh has noted the serial numbers of the stolen money and this information is used to hunt down the killers/robbers. Hop-Along goes "undercover" posing as a fancy pants to smoke out the killers/robbers of the $30,000.

== Cast ==
- William Boyd as Hopalong Cassidy
- George "Gabby" Hayes as Windy Halliday
- Russell Hayden as Lucky Jenkins
- Charlotte Wynters as Ann Marsh
- Jan Clayton as Dorrie Marsh
- Robert Fiske as Monte Keller
- Kenneth Harlan as John Marsh
- Anthony Nace as Henchman Steve Dorman
- Kathryn Sheldon as Abigail Snodgrass
- Maurice Cass as E. Prescott Furbush
- Alphonse Ethier as Superintendent
- Glenn Strange as Bouncer
- Claudia Smith as Mary Rogers
