= Carnival Queen (film) =

1937 American film directed by Nate Watt

- Theatrical release poster
- Directed by: Nate Watt
- Screenplay by: James Mulhauser; Harold Buckley
- Based on: Love in the Mud by Richard Wormser
- Produced by: Robert Presnell Sr.
- Starring: Robert Wilcox; Dorothea Kent; Hobart Cavanaugh; G. Pat Collins; Harry Tyler; Ernest Cossart; David Oliver; Billy Wayne; Jonathan Hale; Raymond Brown
- Cinematography: George Robinson
- Edited by: Maurice Wright
- Production company: Universal Pictures
- Distributed by: Universal Pictures
- Release date: October 3, 1937
- Running time: 66 minutes
- Country: United States
- Language: English

Carnival Queen is a 1937 American crime film directed by Nate Watt and written by James Mulhauser and Harold Buckley. The film stars Robert Wilcox, Dorothea Kent, Hobart Cavanaugh, G. Pat Collins, Harry Tyler, Ernest Cossart, David Oliver, Billy Wayne, Jonathan Hale and Raymond Brown. It was released on October 3, 1937, by Universal Pictures.

== Plot ==
Self-involved heiress Marion Prescott discovers that she has lost almost all she owns in the Great Depression. Her one remaining asset is a carnival.

== Cast ==
- Robert Wilcox as Art Calhoun
- Dorothea Kent as Marion Prescott
- Hobart Cavanaugh as Professor Sylva
- G. Pat Collins as Bert MacGregor
- Harry Tyler as Fingers
- Ernest Cossart as Spaulding
- David Oliver as Chuck
- Billy Wayne as Hanlin
- Jonathan Hale as Robert Jacoby
- Raymond Brown as Constable
- Jimmy O'Gatty as Nick
- Frank Lackteen as Ala Ben Ala
- Jack Rube Clifford as Deputy Constable
- David Takahashi as Kyra
