= Lady Behave! =

1937 film by Lloyd Corrigan

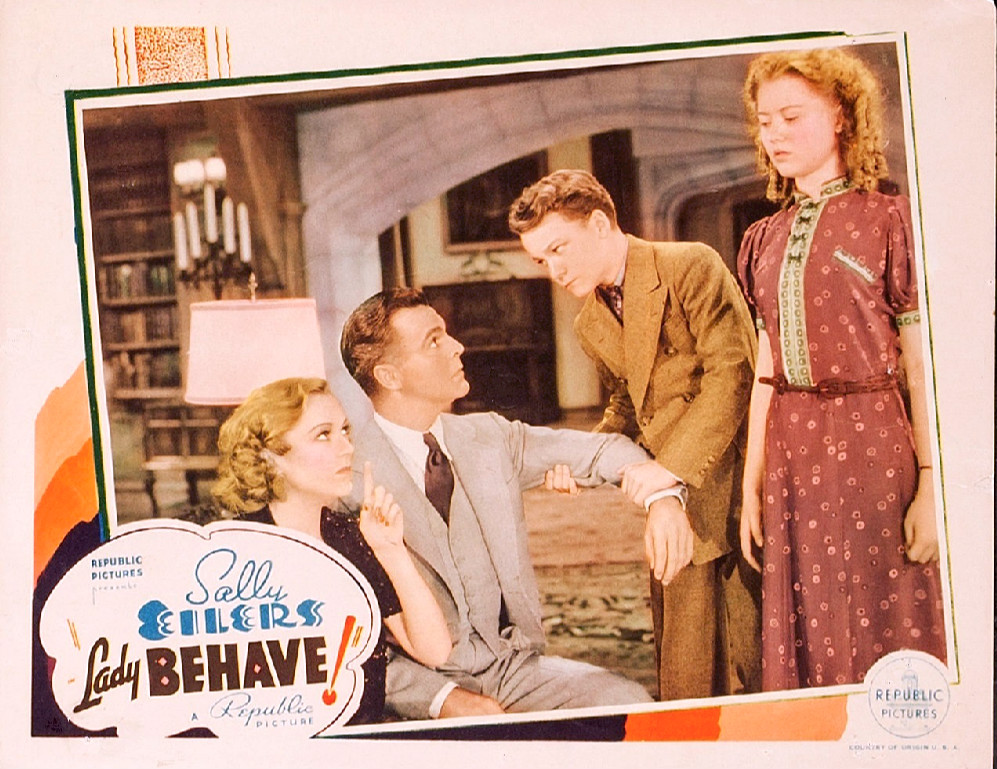
- Lobby card
- Directed by: Lloyd Corrigan
- Written by: Joseph Krumgold (screenplay); Olive Cooper (screenplay); Joseph Krumgold (original story)
- Produced by: Albert E. Levoy (associate producer)
- Starring: Sally Eilers; Neil Hamilton
- Cinematography: Harry J. Wild
- Edited by: William Morgan
- Music by: Alberto Colombo
- Distributed by: Republic Pictures
- Release date: January 5, 1938
- Running time: 70 minutes 53 minutes (American edited version)
- Country: United States
- Language: English

Lady Behave! is a 1938 American film directed by Lloyd Corrigan. The sophisticated comedy was released by Republic Pictures.

== Plot ==
Prior to leaving for Haiti, two sisters and their godfather/legal advisor are having a holiday in New Orleans. The fun loving Clarice goes out for a night on the town for Mardi Gras, as sensible conservative Paula and godfather Burton Williams remain home and prepare for their journey. Clarice comes back drunk in the morning. Before she passes out, she reveals she married the equally drunk wealthy playboy Stephen Cormack during the night. Clarice has forgotten that she is already married to gigolo Michael Andrews.

Cormack's solicitor shows up and mistakes Paula for Clarice. Used to Cormack's matrimonial antics, he offers Paula $5000 to divorce Cormack. Burton and Paula confer on the matter and discover that Clarice faces a minimum of ten years in prison for bigamy if the marriage is revealed. Paula has to impersonate Clarice until Burton can have the marriage of Clarice and Michael annulled.

Burton and Paula travel to New York City, where Cormack, his two children, and Michael live. Burton hatches a plan with Michael for him to portray a lover of Paula posing as Clarice to anger Cormack. The scheming Michael demands payment for his efforts, then on meeting Cormack's spoiled two children who wish to break up their father's marriage, tells them he will break up the marriage if they pay him $30,000, with $15,000 up front. Skilled in financial matters, Paula is able to acquire the $15,000 the children want without asking what the amount is for.

Over time, Paula keeps her virtue and the secret of her real identity intact, but Cormack's children begin to like her and want her to be their mother. Cormack gets into a brawl with Michael over Paula, posing as Clarice. However, the real Clarice arrives back with the news that her marriage with Michael is annulled. Clarice sues Cormack and asks for a divorce, thus leaving Cormack and Paula to be together.

== Cast ==
- Sally Eilers as Paula Kendall
- Neil Hamilton as Stephen Cormack
- Joseph Schildkraut as Michael Andrews
- Grant Mitchell as Burton Williams
- Patricia Farr as Clarice Kendall Andrews Cormack
- Marcia Mae Jones as Patricia Cormack
- George Ernest as Hank Cormack
- Warren Hymer as Butch
- Robert Greig as Alfred
- Charles Richman as Howell
- Spencer Charters as Innkeeper
- Mary Gordon as Cook

== Production ==
The film began with the title The Lady Misbehaves but Production Code Administration (PCA) director Joseph Breen strongly disapproved of the film's premise of "dealing with so serious a subject as a bigamous marriage, where the treatment is set for comedy." The Hays Office told Republic Pictures that in these times ladies do not misbehave; the dropping of "mis" would still give the desired undesirable impression.

The PCA approved the film when several changes were made to the script and the title was changed.
