= Patricia Farr =

American actress (1913–1948)

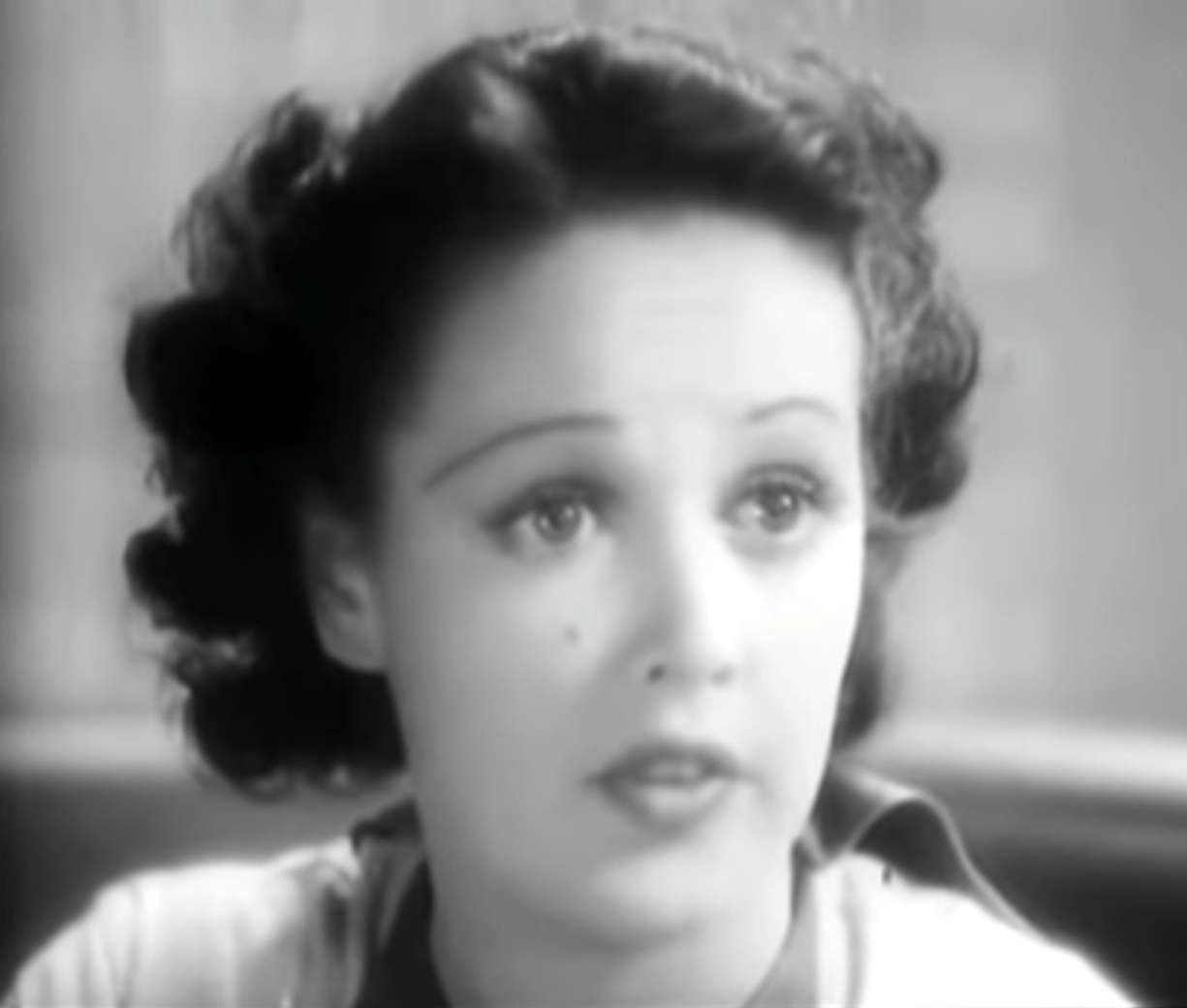
- Farr in Lady Luck (1936)
- Born: Arleine Rutledge Farr; January 15, 1913; Kansas City, Missouri, U.S.
- Died: February 23, 1948 (aged 35); Burbank, California, U.S.
- Other name: The Kansas City Girl
- Occupation: Actress
- Years active: 1931–1945
- Spouse: Robert Mayo (m. 1937)

Patricia Farr (born Arleine Rutledge Farr; January 15, 1913 – February 23, 1948) was an American actress who appeared in films of the 1930s and 1940s. Despite being billed as leading lady in at least one (Lady Luck) of the films in which she appeared, very few details of her life are available.

== Early years ==
Farr was the daughter of Mr. and Mrs. Larry Farr. She grew up in Ogden, Utah, where her great-great-grandfather had been mayor.

== Personal ==
The St. Maurice Valley Chronicle reported that her personal hobby was the collecting of "hot" swing phonograph records, and at the time of her appearing with Charles Quigley and Dorothy Wilson in Speed to Spare, she had two cabinets full of such records, many of them privately made original recordings.

Farr was married to Robert Mayo, a casting director with Columbia Pictures.

== Career ==
She was working as a movie theater usherette in Los Angeles when she was first signed by Paramount Pictures. She had a number of smaller roles before being cast as lead in the 12-part Universal Pictures serial Tailspin Tommy. She received training at a company school at Fox Studios for their stock actors. Farr was one of 14 young women "launched on the trail of film stardom" August 6, 1935, when they each received a six-month contract with 20th Century Fox after spending 18 months in the company's training school. The contracts included a studio option for renewal for as long as seven years.

Farr's film debut came in The Secret Call (1931).

As a young actress in 1936, Farr was speaking about Friday the 13th when she chose that day to sign a long-term contract with Columbia Pictures, being quoted as saying it "is my lucky day".

According to the Classic Actresses website, Farr was diagnosed with pancreatic cancer in 1946, died from the disease on February 23, 1948, and was buried at Forest Lawn Memorial Park in Glendale, California.

== Recognition ==
The Sydney Morning Herald reported on her work in Lady Behave!, writing, "Patricia Farr has the makings of first-class comedienne." They praised her for extracting more out of her role than was expected.

== Filmography ==
- The Secret Call (1931) as Ellen
- Silence (1931) (uncredited)
- What Price Hollywood? (1932) (uncredited)
- I Loved You Wednesday (1933) (uncredited)
- My Weakness (1933) (uncredited)
- Footlight Parade (1933) as Chorus Girl (uncredited)
- I Am Suzanne! (1933) as Chorine (uncredited)
- Stand Up and Cheer! (1934) (uncredited)
- Tailspin Tommy (1934) as Betty Lou Barnes
- Helldorado (1935) as Flo (uncredited)
- Orchids to You (1935) as Polly
- Metropolitan (1935) as Chorus Girl (uncredited)
- The Lady in Scarlet (1935) as Ella Carey
- Everybody's Old Man (1936) as Telephone Girl (uncredited)
- Three of a Kind (1936) as Prudence Cornelius
- Lady Luck (1936) as Mamie Murphy
- Criminals of the Air (1937) as Maimie
- Speed to Spare (1937) as Peaches OBrien
- Girls Can Play (1937) as Peanuts O'Malley
- All American Sweetheart (1937) as Connie Adams
- Lady Behave! (1937) as Clarice Kendall Andrews Cormack
- Trade Winds (1938) as Peggy (uncredited)
- Mr. & Mrs. Smith (1941) as Gloria
- West Point Widow (1941) as Miss Hinkle
- New Wine (1941) as Miss LaRue - gigolo's companion (framing sequences)
- Three Girls About Town (1941) as Telephone Operator (uncredited)
- Skylark (1941) as Lil - Waitress at Hamburger Stand (uncredited)
- To the Shores of Tripoli (1942) as Girl (uncredited)
- This Gun for Hire (1942) as Ruby
- Highways by Night (1942) as Phyllis (uncredited)
- National Barn Dance (1942) as Secretary (uncredited)
- Incendiary Blonde (1945) as Bill's Receptionist (uncredited)
