= The Lady in Scarlet =

1935 film by Charles Lamont

- Lobby card
- Directed by: Charles Lamont
- Written by: Arthur Hoerl
- Screenplay by: Robert Ellis; Helen Logan
- Produced by: George R. Batcheller
- Cinematography: M. A. Andersen
- Edited by: Roland D. Reed
- Distributed by: Chesterfield Pictures
- Release date: 1935
- Running time: 65 minutes
- Country: United States
- Language: English

The Lady in Scarlet is a 1935 American comedy drama film directed by Charles Lamont. It was made by Chesterfield Motion Pictures Corporation.

== Plot ==
In New York City, Dr. Phillip Boyer purchases an antique clock at the premises of antique dealer Albert J. Sayre and arranges with salesman Arthur Pennyward for the clock to be delivered that afternoon. When Boyer departs, Sayre, who has been secretly watching, accuses his wife of taking a romantic interest in Boyer.

About 5.30pm, Mrs. Sayre meets Dr. Boyer at a restaurant. Also present at the restaurant are Private Investigator Oliver Keith and his "girl friday" Ella Carey. When Boyer departs, Mrs. Sayre approaches Keith, asking for his help in finding out why a man has been watching the Sayre house and the reason for her husband's strange behavior. Keith escorts her home and together they find an unlocked front door and the dead body of Sayre in his office.

Police are called and establish time of death at "about 5 o'clock." Mrs. Sayre says she went to her hairdressing salon at around 4pm. Sayre's daughter Alice accuses Mrs. Sayre, her stepmother, of murdering her father for inheritance money. Dr. Boyer denies any romantic interest in Mrs. Sayre. Fingerprints provide a lead to rival antique dealer F.W. Dyker. Questioning reveals that Pennyward and Alice married the previous day over Sayre's objections. Boyer's alibi of being at his medical practice till 5.30 is found to be false as he left about 3.30. Pennyward reveals to Keith that Sayre ran a profitable enterprise selling fake antiques through Dyker, but they argued over payments.

The family assembles for the reading of the will by attorney Shelby. The estate is shared equally between Sayre's wife and daughter, as Sayre was murdered before signing the new will. Strangely, $100,000 in bonds which Alice knows should be hers upon marriage are not mentioned in the will. When the bonds are found to be missing, Alice accuses Mrs. Sayre of theft.

Keith, Ella, and Officer Trainey find the man who has been seen watching the Sayre home. Named Quigley, he reveals he was paid by Sayre to follow Mrs. Sayre and that she and Boyer were together much earlier on the afternoon of the murder than they had admitted. Later that evening, Dr. Boyer is found murdered in his car.

Several of the missing bonds are found in Pennyward's satchel and are identified by Shelby as exactly the same type as the missing bonds, despite his remark on the day of the reading of the will that he knew nothing of their type or denomination. Caught in a lie, Shelby is accused by Keith of murdering Sayre when he visited Sayre's home for the signing of the will. Shelby pulls a gun and fires it but is overpowered, with the bullet expected to provide ballistics evidence that he killed Boyer too. Quigley is arrested for blackmailing both Sayre and Boyer.

Alice and her stepmother reconcile. Pennyward and Alice go off on their honeymoon. Dyker goes free but with his reputation even more tarnished.

== Cast ==
- Reginald Denny as Oliver Keith
- Patricia Farr as Ella Carey
- Jamison Thomas (sic) as Dr. Phillip J. Boyer
- Dorothy Revier as Mrs. Julia Sayre
- James Bush as Arthur Pennyward
- John St. Polis as Jerome T. Shelby
- Claudia Dell as Alice Sayre/Pennyward
- John T. Murray as Albert J. Sayre
- Lew Kelly as Inspector Lewis Trainey
- Jack Adair as F. W. Dyker
