= Charlotte Wynters =

American actress

- Born: December 4, 1899; Wheeling, West Virginia, U.S.
- Died: January 7, 1991 (aged 91); Santa Monica, California, U.S.
- Occupation: Actress
- Years active: 1931-1957 (film)
- Known for: Sunset Trail; Cipher Bureau; Nancy Drew... Trouble Shooter; Reformatory; The Falcon's Brother; Clarence
- Spouse(s): Charles E. Schall (1928–1938) (divorced); Barton MacLane (1939–1969) (his death)

Charlotte Wynters (December 4, 1899 – January 7, 1991) was an American stage and film actress.

== Biography ==
A native of Wheeling, West Virginia, Wynters appeared as a leading lady in a number of B pictures during the 1930s.

During the 1922–23 theatrical season, Wynters headed a stock company at the Lyceum Theatre in Paterson, New Jersey. In the 1929–30 season, she acted with a troupe at the Adelphi Theater in Philadelphia. On Broadway, Wynters appeared in Bad Girl (1930), The Wiser They Are (1931), A Regular Guy (1931), Air Minded (1932), and Her Tin Soldier (1933).

On November 22, 1939, Wynters married actor Barton MacLane in Beverly Hills. She also was married to Charles Schall.

== Filmography ==
Year	Title	Role	Notes
1931	Personal Maid	Gwen Gary	
1931	His Woman	Flo	
1931	The Struggle	Nina	
1935	The Ivory-Handled Gun	Paddy Moore	
1935	The Calling of Dan Matthews	Hope Strong	
1936	The Trail of the Lonesome Pine	Katherine Hale	Uncredited
1936	Mr. Cinderella	Martha	
1936	The Man I Marry	Bridesmaid	Uncredited
1936	Let's Make a Million	Caroline	
1937	Smart Blonde	Marcia Friel	
1937	Girl Overboard	Molly Shane	
1937	Clarence	Violet	
1938	The Buccaneer	Charming Southern Lady	Uncredited
1938	The Baroness and the Butler	Lady at Charity Party	Uncredited
1938	Sinners in Paradise	Thelma Chase	
1938	Reformatory	Adele Webster	
1938	Professor Beware	Dorothy - Reporter	Uncredited
1938	Sunset Trail	Ann Marsh	
1938	Cipher Bureau	Helen Lane	
1939	Pride of the Navy	Mrs. Falcon	
1939	Panama Patrol	Helen Lane	
1939	Nancy Drew… Trouble Shooter	Edna Gregory	
1939	Renegade Trail	Mary Joyce	
1939	The Women	Miss Batchelor	Uncredited
1940	City of Chance	Mrs. Helen Walcott	
1940	Parole Fixer	Nellie	
1940	Tomboy	Frances - the Schoolteacher	
1940	Queen of the Mob	Mrs. Grimley	
1940	Gallant Sons	Estelle	
1941	High Sierra	Woman Behind Counter	Uncredited
1941	The Great Lie	Mrs. Anderson	Uncredited
1941	Dive Bomber	Mrs. Silvers - Hostess	Uncredited
1941	Life Begins for Andy Hardy	Elizabeth Norton	Uncredited
1941	Married Bachelor	Margaret Johns	Uncredited
1941	Ellery Queen and the Murder Ring	Miss Fox	
1941	Design for Scandal	Thelma	Uncredited
1942	Dr. Kildare's Victory	Mrs. Hubbell	
1942	A Desperate Chance for Ellery Queen	Mrs. Irene Evington Hadley	
1942	Are Husbands Necessary?	Mrs. Finley	
1942	Halfway to Shanghai	Caroline Rawlins	
1942	The Falcon's Brother	Arlette	
1942	Now, Voyager	Grace Weston	Uncredited
1943	Man of Courage	Joyce Griffith	
1943	The Powers Girl	Miss McAllister	Uncredited
1943	The Underdog	Mrs. Bailey	
1943	Harvest Melody	Nancy	
1945	The Phantom Speaks	Cornelia Wilmont	
1945	Mama Loves Papa	Mrs. McIntosh	
1947	The Hal Roach Comedy Carnival	Miss Hart, in 'Fabulous Joe'	
1947	The Fabulous Joe	Miss Hart, Secretary	Uncredited
1948	Lulu Belle	Mrs. Gloria Randolph	
1950	A Woman of Distinction	Miss Withers	Uncredited
1955	Foxfire	Mrs. Mablett	
1957	Eighteen and Anxious	Mrs. Warren	
