= Risky Business (1939 film) =

- Directed by: Arthur Lubin
- Written by: Charles Grayson
- Based on: story Okay America by William Anthony McGuire
- Produced by: Burt Kelly
- Starring: George Murphy; Dorothea Kent
- Cinematography: Stanley Cortez
- Edited by: Maurice Wright
- Music by: Vera West
- Distributed by: Universal Pictures
- Release date: 3 March 1939
- Running time: 65 mins
- Country: United States
- Language: English

Risky Business is a 1939 film directed by Arthur Lubin and starring George Murphy and Dorothea Kent.

== Plot ==
Radio commentator Dan Clifford takes desperate chances to save the life of a young girl, Norma Jameson, who has been kidnapped.

== Cast ==
- George Murphy as Dan Clifford
- Dorothea Kent as Mary Dexter
- Eduardo Ciannelli as Philip Decarno
- Leon Ames as Hinge Jackson
- El Brendel as Axel
- John Wray as Silas
- Arthur Loft as Captain Wallace
- Frances Robinson as Norma Jameson
- Pierre Watkin as Abernathy
- Grant Richards as Jack Norman
- Charles Trowbridge as Henry Jameson
- Mary Forbes as Mrs. Jameson

== Production ==
The film was based on a story by William McGuire, Okay America, which had been filmed in 1932.

Arthur Lubin was attached to the project on 20 January 1939. George Murphy occasionally worked for Universal under one picture arrangements. Filming started January 30, 1939.

== Reception ==
The New York Times said the film was not interesting and was "a risky entertainment." The Los Angeles Times said it had an "ingenious" story and "unusually good acting and direction."
