= Charles Lamont =

American filmmaker (1895–1993)

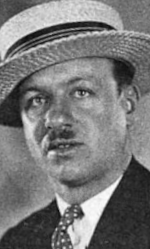
- In The Moving Picture World, February 1927
- Born: Charles Fred Lamont; May 5, 1895; San Francisco, California, U.S.
- Died: September 11, 1993 (aged 98); Woodland Hills, Los Angeles, California, U.S.
- Spouse: Estelle Bradley

Charles Lamont (May 5, 1895 – September 11, 1993) was an American filmmaker, known for directing over 200 titles and producing and writing many others. He directed nine Abbott and Costello comedies and many Ma and Pa Kettle films.

== Biography ==
Lamont was born in San Francisco. Lamont came from a family of actors, being the fourth generation to be an actor. He appeared onstage while a teenager and started appearing in films from 1919. He worked as a prop man before becoming assistant director.

Lamont started directing comedy shorts in 1922, including for Mack Sennett and Al Christie. Some of Lamont's earliest directorial jobs were silent short-subject comedies for Educational Pictures. One of the studio's popular series was Juvenile Comedies, featuring the child actor Malcolm "Big Boy" Sebastian. Lamont directed some of these films, as well as some of the competing "Buster Brown" comedies for Universal Pictures release. Both Educational and Universal figured prominently in Lamont's career.

In 1932 Educational assigned Lamont to the Baby Burlesks series of short comedies, which featured the then-four year old Shirley Temple. By 1934 Lamont was Educational's top director, and he collaborated with Buster Keaton on most of Keaton's 16 Educational shorts.

After Educational shut down its Hollywood studio, Lamont was hired by Columbia Pictures to work with such stars as Charley Chase and The Three Stooges, but his stay was short ("I had an intense hatred for [Columbia president] Harry Cohn," said Lamont to authors Ted Okuda and Edward Watz).

Lamont then freelanced at various studios (and produced a few features himself) before joining Universal Pictures in 1942. Lamont always had a tremendous rapport with juvenile performers, and Universal entrusted him with a series of musical-comedy vehicles for the studio's teenage singing star Gloria Jean. Lamont emphasized the comic elements of the films, with Donald O'Connor and Peggy Ryan contributing their talents, and the teen musicals were very popular with wartime audiences.

Lamont directed a couple of 1945 films starring Yvonne de Carlo and Rod Cameron, Salome Where She Danced and Frontier Gal, which were not well known in the US but were popular with some French critics.

Lamont's experience with limited budgets served him well at Universal, and soon he was promoted to the studio's more important productions. By 1950 he was established as one of Universal's most efficient directors. So it was with surprise and reluctance that Lamont received his new assignment: Abbott and Costello movies. These comedy features were moneymakers for the studio but had no prestige at all, and Lamont bristled at what seemed to be a backward career move. His Universal bosses explained their need for a good comedy director who could do the job indefinitely, and Lamont came to realize that "Abbott and Costello were my future." Lamont remained with the team until the studio cut them loose in 1955.

Lamont also directed Universal's successful Ma and Pa Kettle comedies; his last film was the final Francis the Talking Mule comedy, Francis in the Haunted House (1956).

Lamont died of pneumonia in Woodland Hills, Los Angeles in 1993 at age 98.

== Selected filmography ==
=== Short subjects ===
- Zorro
- The Big Game (1923)
- Don't Play Hookey (1923)
- Mama's Baby Boy (1923)
- Hats (1924)
- Her City Sport (1924)
- Raisin' Cain (1925)
- Maid in Morocco (1925)
- Sea Scamps (1926)
- My Kid (1926)
- Brunettes Prefer Gentlemen (1927)
- Scared Silly (1927)
- Misplaced Husbands (1928)
- The Crazy Nut (1929)
- Fake Flappers (1929)
- Dance with Me (1930)
- Don't Get Excited (1930)
- My Kid (1931)
- Fast and Furious (1931)
- The Pie-Covered Wagon (1932)
- War Babies (1932) (one of eight Baby Burlesks films with Shirley Temple, 1932–33)
- Merrily Yours (1933)
- Pardon My Pups (1934)
- Managed Money (1934)
- The Gold Ghost (1934)
- Allez Oop (1934)
- Palooka from Paducah (1935)
- Hayseed Romance (1935)
- Tars and Stripes (1935)
- The E-Flat Man (1935)
- Restless Knights (1935)
- Three on a Limb (1936)
- Grand Slam Opera (1936)
- Love Nest on Wheels (1937)
- Playing the Ponies (1937)
- Jail Bait (1937)
- Ditto (1937)
- The Wrong Miss Wright (1937)
- Calling All Doctors (1937)

=== Feature films ===
- Sons of Steel (1934)
- Circumstantial Evidence (1935)
- The Lady in Scarlet (1935)
- Tomorrow's Youth (1935)
- A Shot in the Dark (1935)
- False Pretenses (1935)
- The Dark Hour (1936)
- Bulldog Edition (1936)
- Below the Deadline (1936)
- Lady Luck (1936)
- Ring Around the Moon (1936)
- Wallaby Jim of the Islands (1937)
- Shadows Over Shanghai (1938)
- Slander House (1938)
- Cipher Bureau (1938)
- International Crime (1938)
- Long Shot (1939)
- Verbena Tragica (1939)
- Unexpected Father (1939)
- Pride of the Navy (1939)
- Panama Patrol (1939)
- Inside Information (1939)
- Give Us Wings (1940)
- Oh Johnny, How You Can Love (1940)
- San Antonio Rose (1941)
- Road Agent (1941)
- You're Telling Me (1942)
- Get Hep to Love (1942)
- Don't Get Personal (1942)
- It Comes Up Love (1942)
- Almost Married (1942)
- Top Man (1943)
- When Johnny Comes Marching Home (1943)
- Mister Big (1943)
- Hit the Ice (1943)
- Bowery to Broadway (1944)
- Chip Off the Old Block (1944)
- The Merry Monahans (1944)
- Salome Where She Danced (1945)
- Frontier Gal (1945)
- Slave Girl (1947)
- The Untamed Breed (1948)
- Ma and Pa Kettle (1949)
- Bagdad (1949)
- Ma and Pa Kettle Go to Town (1950)
- Abbott and Costello in the Foreign Legion (1950)
- Curtain Call at Cactus Creek (1950)
- I Was a Shoplifter (1950)
- Comin' Round the Mountain (1951)
- Flame of Araby (1951)
- Abbott and Costello Meet the Invisible Man (1951)
- Abbott and Costello Meet Captain Kidd (1952)
- Abbott and Costello Go to Mars (1953)
- Ma and Pa Kettle on Vacation (1953)
- Abbott and Costello Meet Dr. Jekyll and Mr. Hyde (1953)
- Ma and Pa Kettle at Home (1954)
- Ricochet Romance (1954)
- Untamed Heiress (1954)
- Carolina Cannonball (1955)
- Abbott and Costello Meet the Keystone Kops (1955)
- Abbott and Costello Meet the Mummy (1955)
- Lay That Rifle Down (1955)
- The Kettles in the Ozarks (1956)
- Francis in the Haunted House (1956)

== Notes ==
- Okuda, Ted (April 1986). "Poker, Petulance and Hijinks with Those Bad Boys from Burlesque". Filmfax. No. 2. pp. 44–48.
