= List of films that won two or more Academy Awards acting categories =

This is a list of films that won two or more Academy Awards acting categories.

The Academy of Motion Picture Arts and Sciences annually presents Academy Awards for acting performances in the following four categories: Best Actor, Best Actress, Best Supporting Actor, and Best Supporting Actress.

As of the 96th Academy Awards (2023), 41 films have won at least two acting awards. Of these, three films – A Streetcar Named Desire (1951), Network (1976), and Everything Everywhere All at Once (2022) – have won three acting awards. The former two were also nominated at least once in each acting category. To date, no film has won four acting Academy Awards, nor has any film swept all four acting categories.

== Four acting awards ==
To date, no film has won all four Academy Awards in the four acting categories (Best Actor, Best Actress, Best Supporting Actor, Best Supporting Actress).

However, there have been fifteen films containing at least one nominated performance in each of the four Academy Award acting categories.

== Three acting awards ==
Ceremony	Year	Film	Best Actor	Best Actress	Best Supporting Actor	Best Supporting Actress
24th	1951	A Streetcar Named Desire	—	Vivien Leigh	Karl Malden	Kim Hunter
49th	1976	Network	Peter Finch	Faye Dunaway	—	Beatrice Straight
95th	2022	Everything Everywhere All at Once	—	Michelle Yeoh	Ke Huy Quan	Jamie Lee Curtis

Notes

- Marlon Brando was nominated for Best Actor for A Streetcar Named Desire. However, he lost to Humphrey Bogart, who won for The African Queen.
- Ned Beatty was nominated for Best Supporting Actor for Network. However, he lost to Jason Robards, who won for All the President's Men.
- William Holden was also nominated for Best Actor for Network, losing to his co-star Finch.
- Stephanie Hsu was also nominated for Best Supporting Actress for Everything Everywhere All at Once, losing to her co-star Curtis.
- Everything Everywhere All at Once is the only film of the three to not have an eligible nominee in the category that they missed (Best Actor).
- Everything Everywhere All at Once is the only film to win three acting Oscars, as well as the Academy Award for Best Picture and Best Director.

== Best Actor and Best Actress ==
Ceremony	Year	Film	Best Actor	Best Actress
7th	1934	It Happened One Night	Clark Gable	Claudette Colbert
48th	1975	One Flew Over the Cuckoo's Nest	Jack Nicholson	Louise Fletcher
49th	1976	Network	Peter Finch	Faye Dunaway
51st	1978	Coming Home	Jon Voight	Jane Fonda
54th	1981	On Golden Pond	Henry Fonda	Katharine Hepburn
64th	1991	The Silence of the Lambs	Anthony Hopkins	Jodie Foster
70th	1997	As Good as It Gets	Jack Nicholson	Helen Hunt

== Best Actor and Best Supporting Actor ==
Ceremony	Year	Film	Best Actor	Best Supporting Actor
17th	1944	Going My Way	Bing Crosby	Barry Fitzgerald
19th	1946	The Best Years of Our Lives	Fredric March	Harold Russell
32nd	1959	Ben-Hur	Charlton Heston	Hugh Griffith
76th	2003	Mystic River	Sean Penn	Tim Robbins
86th	2013	Dallas Buyers Club	Matthew McConaughey	Jared Leto
96th	2023	Oppenheimer	Cillian Murphy	Robert Downey Jr.

== Best Actor and Best Supporting Actress ==
Ceremony	Year	Film	Best Actor	Best Supporting Actress
22nd	1949	All the King's Men	Broderick Crawford	Mercedes McCambridge
27th	1954	On the Waterfront	Marlon Brando	Eva Marie Saint
31st	1958	Separate Tables	David Niven	Wendy Hiller
33rd	1960	Elmer Gantry	Burt Lancaster	Shirley Jones
49th	1976	Network	Peter Finch	Beatrice Straight
52nd	1979	Kramer vs. Kramer	Dustin Hoffman	Meryl Streep
62nd	1989	My Left Foot	Daniel Day-Lewis	Brenda Fricker

== Best Actress and Best Supporting Actor ==
Ceremony	Year	Film	Best Actress	Best Supporting Actor
24th	1951	A Streetcar Named Desire	Vivien Leigh	Karl Malden
36th	1963	Hud	Patricia Neal	Melvyn Douglas
45th	1972	Cabaret	Liza Minnelli	Joel Grey
56th	1983	Terms of Endearment	Shirley MacLaine	Jack Nicholson
77th	2004	Million Dollar Baby	Hilary Swank	Morgan Freeman
90th	2017	Three Billboards Outside Ebbing, Missouri	Frances McDormand	Sam Rockwell
95th	2022	Everything Everywhere All at Once	Michelle Yeoh	Ke Huy Quan

== Best Actress and Best Supporting Actress ==
Ceremony	Year	Film	Best Actress	Best Supporting Actress
11th	1938	Jezebel	Bette Davis	Fay Bainter
12th	1939	Gone with the Wind	Vivien Leigh	Hattie McDaniel
15th	1942	Mrs. Miniver	Greer Garson	Teresa Wright
24th	1951	A Streetcar Named Desire	Vivien Leigh	Kim Hunter
35th	1962	The Miracle Worker	Anne Bancroft	Patty Duke
39th	1966	Who's Afraid of Virginia Woolf?	Elizabeth Taylor	Sandy Dennis
49th	1976	Network	Faye Dunaway	Beatrice Straight
60th	1987	Moonstruck	Cher	Olympia Dukakis
66th	1993	The Piano	Holly Hunter	Anna Paquin
71st	1998	Shakespeare in Love	Gwyneth Paltrow	Judi Dench
95th	2022	Everything Everywhere All at Once	Michelle Yeoh	Jamie Lee Curtis

== Best Supporting Actor and Best Supporting Actress ==
Ceremony	Year	Film	Best Supporting Actor	Best Supporting Actress
24th	1951	A Streetcar Named Desire	Karl Malden	Kim Hunter
26th	1953	From Here to Eternity	Frank Sinatra	Donna Reed
30th	1957	Sayonara	Red Buttons	Miyoshi Umeki
34th	1961	West Side Story	George Chakiris	Rita Moreno
44th	1971	The Last Picture Show	Ben Johnson	Cloris Leachman
50th	1977	Julia	Jason Robards	Vanessa Redgrave
59th	1986	Hannah and Her Sisters	Michael Caine	Dianne Wiest
83rd	2010	The Fighter	Christian Bale	Melissa Leo
95th	2022	Everything Everywhere All at Once	Ke Huy Quan	Jamie Lee Curtis

== Superlatives ==
There are six possible combinations by which a film can win two Academy Awards for acting.

- The first film to win two acting awards was It Happened One Night (1934), which won Best Actor and Best Actress at the 7th Academy Awards.
- The most recent film to win at least two acting awards was Oppenheimer (2023), which won Best Actor and Best Supporting Actor at the 96th Academy Awards.
- The combination that has occurred most often is Best Actress and Best Supporting Actress (eleven films).
- The combination that has occurred least often is Best Actor and Best Supporting Actor (six films).
- The combination that occurred the longest time ago is Best Actor and Best Supporting Actress, with My Left Foot (1989) winning both at the 62nd Academy Awards.
- The combination with the longest gap between award wins is Best Actor and Best Supporting Actor, which occurred 44 years apart: first with Ben-Hur (1959) at the 32nd Academy Awards, and again with Mystic River (2003) at the 76th Academy Awards.
- The Miracle Worker (1962) and Hud (1963) are the only films to win two or more acting Oscars without getting nominated for the Academy Award for Best Picture.
- Jezebel (1938), Separate Tables (1958), Elmer Gantry (1960), As Good as It Gets (1997), Dallas Buyers Club (2013), and Three Billboards Outside Ebbing, Missouri (2017) are the only films to win multiple acting Oscars without receiving an Academy Award for Best Director nomination.

== See also ==
- List of Big Five Academy Award winners and nominees
- List of films with all four Academy Award acting nominations
- List of movies with more than one Academy Award nomination in the same category
- List of actors with two or more Academy Awards in acting categories
