= List of movies with more than one Academy Award nomination in the same category =

These are lists of movies with more than one Academy Award nomination in a single category. There are five categories in which this is possible: the four acting categories, and Best Original Song.

From the 81st Academy Awards, producers can submit at most two songs from the same film for Best Original Song; prior to this, four films received three nominations in the category.

There is no statutory limit on the number of acting nominees from the same film in a single category. As of the 97th Academy Awards, no film has ever received more than three; the last film to do so was The Godfather Part II, which received three nominations for Best Supporting Actor at the 47th Academy Awards.

The movie, year and nominees are listed, as well as the outcome at the ceremony.

== Academy Award for Best Actor ==
Year	Film	Nominees	Winner
1935 (8th)	Mutiny on the Bounty	Clark Gable, Charles Laughton, and Franchot Tone	Victor McLaglen, The Informer
1944 (17th)	Going My Way	Bing Crosby and Barry Fitzgerald	Crosby
1953 (26th)	From Here to Eternity	Montgomery Clift and Burt Lancaster	William Holden, Stalag 17
1956 (29th)	Giant	James Dean and Rock Hudson	Yul Brynner, The King and I
1958 (31st)	The Defiant Ones	Tony Curtis and Sidney Poitier	David Niven, Separate Tables
1961 (34th)	Judgment at Nuremberg	Maximilian Schell and Spencer Tracy	Schell
1964 (37th)	Becket	Richard Burton and Peter O'Toole	Rex Harrison, My Fair Lady
1969 (42nd)	Midnight Cowboy	Dustin Hoffman and Jon Voight	John Wayne, True Grit
1972 (45th)	Sleuth	Michael Caine and Laurence Olivier	Marlon Brando, The Godfather
1976 (49th)	Network	Peter Finch and William Holden	Finch
1983 (56th)	The Dresser	Tom Courtenay and Albert Finney	Robert Duvall, Tender Mercies
1984 (57th)	Amadeus	F. Murray Abraham and Tom Hulce	Abraham

== Academy Award for Best Actress ==
Year	Film	Nominees	Winner
1950 (23rd)	All About Eve	Anne Baxter and Bette Davis	Judy Holliday, Born Yesterday
1959 (32nd)	Suddenly, Last Summer	Katharine Hepburn and Elizabeth Taylor	Simone Signoret, Room at the Top
1977 (50th)	The Turning Point	Anne Bancroft and Shirley MacLaine	Diane Keaton, Annie Hall
1983 (56th)	Terms of Endearment	Shirley MacLaine and Debra Winger	MacLaine
1991 (64th)	Thelma & Louise	Geena Davis and Susan Sarandon	Jodie Foster, The Silence of the Lambs

== Academy Award for Best Supporting Actor ==
Year	Film	Nominees	Winner
1939 (12th)	Mr. Smith Goes to Washington	Harry Carey and Claude Rains	Thomas Mitchell, Stagecoach
1951 (24th)	Quo Vadis	Leo Genn and Peter Ustinov	Karl Malden, A Streetcar Named Desire
1953 (26th)	Shane	Brandon deWilde and Jack Palance	Frank Sinatra, From Here to Eternity
1954 (27th)	On the Waterfront	Lee J. Cobb, Karl Malden, and Rod Steiger	Edmond O'Brien, The Barefoot Contessa
1957 (30th)	Peyton Place	Arthur Kennedy and Russ Tamblyn	Red Buttons, Sayonara
1959 (32nd)	Anatomy of a Murder	Arthur O'Connell and George C. Scott	Hugh Griffith, Ben-Hur
1961 (34th)	The Hustler	Jackie Gleason and George C. Scott	George Chakiris, West Side Story
1967 (40th)	Bonnie and Clyde	Gene Hackman and Michael J. Pollard	George Kennedy, Cool Hand Luke
1971 (44th)	The Last Picture Show	Jeff Bridges and Ben Johnson	Johnson
1972 (45th)	The Godfather	James Caan, Robert Duvall, and Al Pacino	Joel Grey, Cabaret
1974 (47th)	The Godfather Part II	Robert De Niro, Michael V. Gazzo, and Lee Strasberg	De Niro
1976 (49th)	Rocky	Burgess Meredith and Burt Young	Jason Robards, All The President's Men
1977 (50th)	Julia	Jason Robards and Maximilian Schell	Robards
1980 (53rd)	Ordinary People	Judd Hirsch and Timothy Hutton	Hutton
1983 (56th)	Terms of Endearment	John Lithgow and Jack Nicholson	Nicholson
1986 (59th)	Platoon	Tom Berenger and Willem Dafoe	Michael Caine, Hannah and Her Sisters
1991 (64th)	Bugsy	Harvey Keitel and Ben Kingsley	Jack Palance, City Slickers
2017 (90th)	Three Billboards Outside Ebbing, Missouri	Woody Harrelson and Sam Rockwell	Rockwell
2019 (92nd)	The Irishman	Al Pacino and Joe Pesci	Brad Pitt, Once Upon a Time in Hollywood
2020/21 (93rd)	Judas and the Black Messiah	Daniel Kaluuya and LaKeith Stanfield	Kaluuya
2021 (94th)	The Power of the Dog	Jesse Plemons and Kodi Smit-McPhee	Troy Kotsur, CODA
2022 (95th)	The Banshees of Inisherin	Brendan Gleeson and Barry Keoghan	Ke Huy Quan, Everything Everywhere All at Once
2025 (98th)	One Battle After Another	Benicio Del Toro and Sean Penn	Penn

== Academy Award for Best Supporting Actress ==
Year	Film	Nominees	Winner
1939 (12th)	Gone with the Wind	Olivia de Havilland and Hattie McDaniel	McDaniel (Note: becoming the first African-American to win an Academy Award.)
1941 (14th)	The Little Foxes	Patricia Collinge and Teresa Wright	Mary Astor, The Great Lie
1942 (15th)	Mrs. Miniver	May Whitty and Teresa Wright	Wright
1943 (16th)	The Song of Bernadette	Gladys Cooper and Anne Revere	Katina Paxinou, For Whom the Bell Tolls
1945 (18th)	Mildred Pierce	Eve Arden and Ann Blyth	Anne Revere, National Velvet
1947 (20th)	Gentleman's Agreement	Celeste Holm and Anne Revere	Holm
1948 (21st)	I Remember Mama	Barbara Bel Geddes and Ellen Corby	Claire Trevor, Key Largo
1949 (22nd)	Come to the Stable	Celeste Holm and Elsa Lanchester	Mercedes McCambridge, All the King's Men
1949 (22nd)	Pinky	Ethel Barrymore and Ethel Waters	Mercedes McCambridge, All the King's Men
1950 (23rd)	All About Eve	Celeste Holm and Thelma Ritter	Josephine Hull, Harvey
1954 (27th)	The High and the Mighty	Jan Sterling and Claire Trevor	Eva Marie Saint, On the Waterfront
1956 (29th)	The Bad Seed	Eileen Heckart and Patty McCormack	Dorothy Malone, Written on the Wind
1957 (30th)	Peyton Place	Hope Lange and Diane Varsi	Miyoshi Umeki, Sayonara
1959 (32nd)	Imitation of Life	Susan Kohner and Juanita Moore	Shelley Winters, The Diary of Anne Frank
1963 (36th)	Tom Jones	Diane Cilento, Edith Evans, and Joyce Redman	Margaret Rutherford, The V.I.P.s
1965 (38th)	Othello	Joyce Redman and Maggie Smith	Shelley Winters, A Patch of Blue
1970 (43rd)	Airport	Helen Hayes and Maureen Stapleton	Hayes
1971 (44th)	The Last Picture Show	Ellen Burstyn and Cloris Leachman	Leachman
1973 (46th)	Paper Moon	Madeline Kahn and Tatum O'Neal	O'Neal
1975 (48th)	Nashville	Ronee Blakley and Lily Tomlin	Lee Grant, Shampoo
1979 (52nd)	Kramer vs. Kramer	Jane Alexander and Meryl Streep	Streep
1982 (55th)	Tootsie	Teri Garr and Jessica Lange	Lange
1985 (58th)	The Color Purple	Margaret Avery and Oprah Winfrey	Anjelica Huston, Prizzi's Honor
1988 (61st)	Working Girl	Joan Cusack and Sigourney Weaver	Geena Davis, The Accidental Tourist
1989 (62nd)	Enemies, A Love Story	Anjelica Huston and Lena Olin	Brenda Fricker, My Left Foot
1994 (67th)	Bullets Over Broadway	Jennifer Tilly and Dianne Wiest	Wiest
2000 (73rd)	Almost Famous	Kate Hudson and Frances McDormand	Marcia Gay Harden, Pollock
2001 (74th)	Gosford Park	Helen Mirren and Maggie Smith	Jennifer Connelly, A Beautiful Mind
2002 (75th)	Chicago	Queen Latifah and Catherine Zeta-Jones	Zeta-Jones
2006 (79th)	Babel	Adriana Barraza and Rinko Kikuchi	Jennifer Hudson, Dreamgirls
2008 (81st)	Doubt	Amy Adams and Viola Davis	Penélope Cruz, Vicky Cristina Barcelona
2009 (82nd)	Up in the Air	Vera Farmiga and Anna Kendrick	Mo'Nique, Precious
2010 (83rd)	The Fighter	Amy Adams and Melissa Leo	Leo
2011 (84th)	The Help	Jessica Chastain and Octavia Spencer	Spencer
2018 (91st)	The Favourite	Emma Stone and Rachel Weisz	Regina King, If Beale Street Could Talk
2022 (95th)	Everything Everywhere All at Once	Jamie Lee Curtis and Stephanie Hsu	Curtis
2025 (98th)	Sentimental Value	Elle Fanning and Inga Ibsdotter Lilleaas	Amy Madigan, Weapons

== Academy Award for Best Original Song ==
Year	Film	Nominees	Winner(s)
1980 (53rd)	Fame	Michael Gore and Dean Pitchford for "Fame"; Michael and Lesley Gore for "Out Here on My Own"	Gore and Pitchford, "Fame"
1983 (56th)	Flashdance	Giorgio Moroder, Keith Forsey, and Irene Cara for "Flashdance... What a Feeling"; Michael Sembello and Dennis Matkosky for "Maniac"	Moroder, Forsey, and Cara, "Flashdance... What a Feeling"
1983 (56th)	Yentl	Michel Legrand and Alan & Marilyn Bergman for "Papa, Can You Hear Me?" and "The Way He Makes Me Feel"	Moroder, Forsey, and Cara, "Flashdance... What a Feeling"
1984 (57th)	Footloose	Kenny Loggins and Tom Snow for "Footloose"; Snow and Dean Pitchford for "Let's Hear It for the Boy"	Stevie Wonder, "I Just Called to Say I Love You" from The Woman in Red
1985 (58th)	White Nights	Lionel Richie for "Say You, Say Me"; Stephen Bishop for "Separate Lives"	Richie, "Say You, Say Me"
1989 (62nd)	The Little Mermaid	Alan Menken and Howard Ashman for "Kiss the Girl" and "Under the Sea"	Menken and Ashman, "Under the Sea"
1991 (64th)	Beauty and the Beast	Alan Menken and Howard Ashman for "Be Our Guest", "Beauty and the Beast", and "Belle"	Menken and Ashman, "Beauty and the Beast"
1992 (65th)	Aladdin	Alan Menken and Tim Rice for "A Whole New World"; Menken and Howard Ashman for "Friend Like Me"	Menken and Rice, "A Whole New World"
1992 (65th)	The Bodyguard	David Foster and Linda Thompson for "I Have Nothing"; Jud J. Friedman and Allan Dennis Rich for "Run to You"	Menken and Rice, "A Whole New World"
1993 (66th)	Philadelphia	Neil Young for "Philadelphia"; Bruce Springsteen for "Streets of Philadelphia"	Springsteen, "Streets of Philadelphia"
1994 (67th)	The Lion King	Elton John and Tim Rice for "Can You Feel the Love Tonight", "Circle of Life", and "Hakuna Matata"	John and Rice, "Can You Feel The Love Tonight"
2003 (76th)	Cold Mountain	Elvis Costello and T Bone Burnett for "The Scarlet Tide"; Sting for "You Will Be My Ain True Love"	Fran Walsh, Howard Shore, and Annie Lennox, "Into the West" from The Lord of the Rings: The Return of the King
2006 (79th)	Dreamgirls	Henry Krieger, Scott Cutler, and Anne Preven for "Listen"; Krieger and Siedah Garrett for "Love You I Do"; Krieger and Willie Reale for "Patience"	Melissa Etheridge, "I Need to Wake Up" from An Inconvenient Truth
2007 (80th)	Enchanted	Alan Menken and Stephen Schwartz for "Happy Working Song", "So Close", and "That's How You Know"	Glen Hansard and Markéta Irglová, "Falling Slowly" from Once
2008 (81st)	Slumdog Millionaire	A. R. Rahman and Gulzar for "Jai Ho"; Rahman and M.I.A. for "O... Saya"	Rahman and Gulzar, "Jai Ho"
2009 (82nd)	The Princess and the Frog	Randy Newman for "Almost There" and "Down in New Orleans"	Ryan Bingham and T Bone Burnett, "The Weary Kind" from Crazy Heart
2016 (89th)	La La Land	Justin Hurwitz and Pasek & Paul for "Audition (The Fools Who Dream)" and "City of Stars"	Hurwitz and Pasek & Paul, "City of Stars"
2023 (96th)	Barbie	Mark Ronson and Andrew Wyatt for "I'm Just Ken"; Billie Eilish and Finneas O'Connell for "What Was I Made For?"	Eilish and O'Connell, "What Was I Made For?"
2024 (97th)	Emilia Pérez	Clément Ducol, Camille, and Jacques Audiard for "El Mal"; Ducol and Camille for "Mi Camino"	Ducol, Camille, and Audiard, "El Mal"

== See also ==
- List of films that won two or more Academy Awards acting categories
