= Let's Make a Million =

1936 film by Ray McCarey

- Theatrical release poster
- Directed by: Ray McCarey
- Screenplay by: Manuel Seff; Robert Yost
- Story by: Thomas Ahearn; Lawrence Pohle
- Produced by: Harold Hurley
- Starring: Charlotte Wynters; Edward Everett Horton; Porter Hall; J. M. Kerrigan; Margaret Seddon; Margaret McWade
- Cinematography: Karl Struss
- Edited by: Doane Harrison
- Production company: Paramount Pictures
- Distributed by: Paramount Pictures
- Release date: December 13, 1936
- Running time: 61 minutes
- Country: United States
- Language: English

Let's Make a Million is a 1936 American comedy film directed by Ray McCarey and written by Manuel Seff and Robert Yost. The film stars Charlotte Wynters, Edward Everett Horton, Porter Hall, J. M. Kerrigan, Margaret Seddon and Margaret McWade. The film was released on December 13, 1936, by Paramount Pictures.

== Plot ==
When Congress votes to pay $2 billion in bonus bonds to World War I veterans, gullible Oklahoma machine supply company owner Harrison Gentry receives $1,100. His greedy aunts want to use the money for a memorial to their father, while his fiancée Caroline wants it as a stake so they can marry. Instead, Gentry goes to Kansas City and is duped into investing it in a phony oil company that promises to drill on a promising parcel in Harrison's hometown. Many townspeople join him in investing, only to go broke when the company gives up on a sham well and dissolves. Harrison is ostracized by his neighbors. He leads an American Legion post to strong-arm the remainder of the money back from the swindlers, and uses it to drill a real well that strikes a gusher.

== Cast ==
- Edward Everett Horton as Harrison Gentry
- Charlotte Wynters as Caroline
- Porter Hall as Spencer
- J. M. Kerrigan as Sam Smith
- Margaret Seddon as Aunt Martha
- Margaret McWade as Aunt Lucy
- Purnell Pratt as Gilbert
- Irving Bacon as Jerry
- Ivan Miller as Peter Winton
