= The E-Flat Man =

1935 film

- Directed by: Charles Lamont
- Written by: Glen Lambert; Charles Lamont
- Produced by: E.H. Allen; E. W. Hammons
- Starring: Buster Keaton
- Cinematography: Dwight Warren
- Production company: Educational Films Corporation of America
- Release date: August 9, 1935
- Running time: 20 minutes
- Country: United States
- Language: English

The E-Flat Man is a 1935 American short comedy film directed by Charles Lamont and starring Buster Keaton. It was written by Glen Lambert and Lamont.

== Plot ==
A mob boss tells his crew to get him some aspirin to treat his aching tooth. Since it is after midnight, his crew break into the closed drug store. Across the street, Elmer waits outside his girlfriend's house as the two plan to elope. The police are alerted to a robbery taking place on the street and when they arrive the robbers escape in Elmer's car and Elmer and his girlfriend mistakenly drive off in the cop car. An alert is put out and Elmer and his girlfriend realize they are now on the run from the police. They take cover on a local farm and hide in a hay bale and in the morning given jobs on the farm: Elmer as a farmhand and his girlfriend as a maid but are soon forced to leave after their description is given again over the farmhouse radio

Back at the station the real robbers are apprehended. Morning arrives and Elmer and his girlfriends are pursued through the cornfields by the police and eventually take cover in a train, not knowing that the compartment they have jumped into is a ventilated refrigerator and they are forced to start a fire to stay warm.

The pair decide to turn themselves in but upon arriving at police headquarters they are taken to another room reserved for marriages and presumably are exonerated of the crimes and married.

== Cast ==
- Buster Keaton as Elmer
- Dorothea Kent as Elmer's girl
- Broderick O'Farrell as Mr. Reynolds
- Charles McAvoy
- Si Jenks as farmer
- Fern Emmett as farmer's wife
- Jack Shutta
- Matthew Betz as hood with toothache (uncredited)
- Bud Jamison as cop (uncredited)

== See also ==
- Buster Keaton filmography
