= The Melody Lingers On (film) =

1935 film by David Burton

- Directed by: David Burton
- Written by: Lillian Hellman; Ralph Block; Philip Dunne
- Produced by: Edward Small
- Starring: Josephine Hutchinson
- Production company: Reliance Pictures
- Distributed by: United Artists
- Release date: 1935
- Country: United States
- Language: English

The Melody Lingers On is a 1935 American film.

== Plot ==
A piano virtuoso has a child out of wedlock to her fiance, who is killed trying to save her life. Their son is brought up by foster parents and becomes a musician.

== Cast ==
- Josephine Hutchinson
- George Houston
- John Halliday

== Production ==
Edward Small bought the rights to the novel in November 1934. Lillian Hellman wrote an early draft of the script. Philip Dunne was then hired to work on it with Ralph Block.

== Reception ==
According to Dunne "The Melody Lingers On lingered not at all in theaters but died a swift and merciful death".
