= Lady Luck (1936 film) =

1936 film by Charles Lamont

- Lobby card
- Directed by: Charles Lamont
- Written by: Dorrell; Stuart McGowan
- Screenplay by: John Kraft
- Produced by: George R. Batcheller
- Starring: Patricia Farr; William Bakewell; Duncan Renaldo
- Cinematography: M. A. Andersen
- Edited by: Roland D. Reed
- Production company: Chesterfield Pictures
- Distributed by: Chesterfield Pictures
- Release date: September 14, 1936
- Running time: 64 minutes
- Country: United States
- Language: English

Lady Luck is a 1936 American comedy film directed by Charles Lamont and starring Patricia Farr, William Bakewell, and Duncan Renaldo. It was made by Chesterfield Motion Pictures Corporation.

Lady Luck is in the public domain as it was issued with a defective copyright notice.

== Plot ==
In New York City, Mamie Murphy is working as a manicurist when she hears on the radio that she has won $2,500 on the racehorse Lady Luck in a sweepstakes draw, with the chance to win a further $150,000. Newspaper reporter Dave Haines is sent to interview Mamie because he already knows her and fancies her. She turns down his invitation to accompany him that evening to the Blue Moon nightclub, but accepts an invitation from "businessman" Jack Conroy.

Conroy, who is actually a financially strapped playboy, is visited at his home by mild-mannered James Hemingway, who half-heartedly threatens him with a revolver and tells him to stay away from his wife. Conroy denies any involvement with her. Arriving at the Blue Moon about 9 pm, Conroy wines and dines Mamie, while being watched scathingly by Mrs. Hemingway who is seated nearby. It's obvious that Conroy has in fact had a romantic liaison with her.

The next day at the salon, Mamie signs a deal with theatrical agents Feinberg Goldberg Sternberg & O'Rooney that will give her a career in showbiz, but only if she wins the $150,000. The win is stipulated because it will give Mamie and any productions in which she appears an enormous amount of free publicity. That evening Mamie learns that she has not won anything at all when the real winner, an older woman also named Mamie Murphy, turns up at her door. The older Murphy offers to keep silent so the showbiz deal will go through.

The horse race is held and Lady Luck wins. Mamie is now making newspaper headlines, and she and "Aunt" Mamie accept the offer from a real estate dealer to move into a plush apartment complete with servants for one month, for his publicity purposes. Mamie and Conroy publicly announce plans to marry. A maid at the new apartment overhears Mamie telling "Aunt" Mamie the whereabouts of her ticket. Soon after, Mamie and Aunt Mamie are drugged with laced coffee and sleep for hours. They find Conroy's dead body in the room when they awaken.

Haines, Mamie, Aunt Mamie, Conroy's valet Briggs, Hemingway and his wife all come under suspicion, but eventually it is revealed that Blue Moon owner Tony Morelli and his wife Rita had set up the loan of the apartment with crooked servants. Their plan was to get the ticket, pass off Rita as Mamie, and collect a fortune from a banker for the ticket. Conroy unexpectedly arrived ahead of the banker, realized a plot was going on, and threatened to notify the police so that Mamie's fortune and his marriage to her would not be jeopardized. Tony shot him and implicated Mamie and Aunt Mamie.

The rich Aunt Mamie is attracted to Detective Lieutenant James Riley, and they go off to a movie together. Mamie, although left with nothing, realises that she may be better off without the troubles brought on by fame and fortune, and resumes her feisty friendship with Dave Haines.

== Cast ==
- Patricia Farr as Mamie Murphy
- William Bakewell as Dave Haines
- Lulu McConnell as "Aunt" Mamie Murphy
- Duncan Renaldo as Tony Morelli
- Iris Adrian as Rita
- Jameson Thomas as Jack Conroy
- Lew Kelly as Det. Lieutenant James Riley
- Vivian Oakland as Mrs. Hemingway
- Claude Allister (sic) as Briggs (Conroy's valet)
- Arthur Hoyt as Mr. Hemingway
- John Kelly as Joe (bouncer at the Blue Moon)
- Charles Lane as Mr. Feinberg
