= The Ivory-Handled Gun =

1935 film by Ray Taylor

- Theatrical release poster
- Directed by: Ray Taylor
- Screenplay by: John T. Neville
- Story by: Charles E. Barnes
- Produced by: Buck Jones
- Starring: Buck Jones; Charlotte Wynters; Walter Miller; Frank Rice; Carl Stockdale; Joseph W. Girard
- Cinematography: Herbert Kirkpatrick; Allen Q. Thompson
- Edited by: Bernard Loftus
- Production company: Universal Pictures
- Distributed by: Universal Pictures
- Release date: November 11, 1935
- Running time: 58 minutes
- Country: United States
- Language: English

The Ivory-Handled Gun is a 1935 American Western film directed by Ray Taylor and written by John T. Neville. The film stars Buck Jones, Charlotte Wynters, Walter Miller, Frank Rice, Carl Stockdale and Joseph W. Girard. The film was released on November 11, 1935, by Universal Pictures.

== Cast ==
- Buck Jones as Buck Ward
- Charlotte Wynters as Paddy Moore
- Walter Miller as Plunkett aka The Wolverine Kid
- Frank Rice as Pike
- Carl Stockdale as Bill Ward
- Joseph W. Girard as Pat Moore
- Niles Welch as Pat Moore as a young man
- Eddie Phillips as Bill Ward as a young man
- Bob Kortman as Alf Steen
- Lee Shumway as Henchman Pete
- Stanley Blystone as Squint Barlow
- Ben Corbett as Henchman Steve
- Lafe McKee as Sheriff Crane
- Silver as Silver

== Critical reception ==
Variety wrote that the film "contains usual number of implausible situations and incredible stunts, but will get over with the western fans." Frank Rice was given credit for giving "the neatest rough-and-ready western characterization uncovered in horse operas for months" that was "head and shoulders above" the rest of the cast, and "Charlotte Wynters is welcome relief from usual sugary heroines of these pictures, though a slight English access is incongruous."
