= Jan Clayton =

American actress (1917–1983)

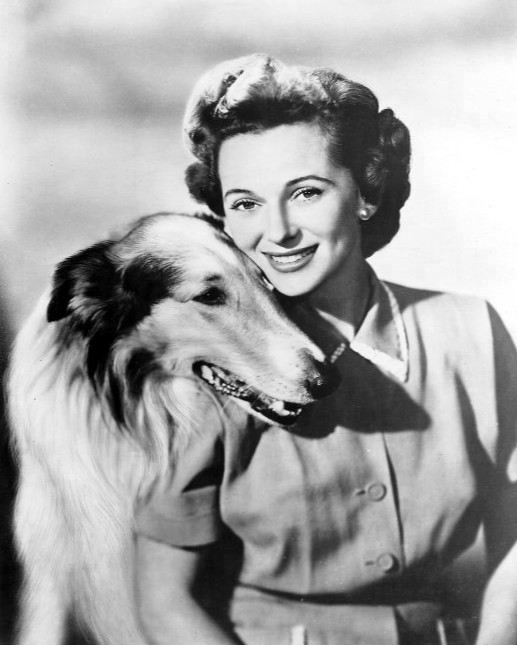
- Clayton with Pal in Lassie (1955)
- Born: August 26, 1917; Tularosa, New Mexico, U.S.
- Died: August 28, 1983 (aged 66); West Hollywood, California, U.S.
- Resting place: Fairview Cemetery, Tularosa, New Mexico
- Occupation: Actress
- Years active: 1935–1981
- Spouses: Russell Hayden (m. 1938; div. 1943) Robert Lerner (m. 1946; div. 1958) George Greeley (m. 1966; div. 1968)
- Children: 4

Jan Clayton (August 26, 1917 – August 28, 1983) was a film, musical theater, and television actress and singer. She starred in the popular 1950s TV series Lassie.

== Early years ==
Born in 1917 in Tularosa, New Mexico, the only child of two schoolteachers, Clayton started singing by age four.

== Career ==
Clayton was a Metro-Goldwyn-Mayer starlet in the early 1940s, appearing in several films, none of them particularly notable, except for an unbilled role in 1948 as a singing inmate in The Snake Pit. She appeared in the role of Julie Jordan in the original 1945 Broadway production of Rodgers and Hammerstein's classic Carousel. Clayton can be heard on the original cast recordings of both Carousel (1945) and the 1946 Broadway revival of Kern's 1927 musical play Show Boat.

In 1954, Clayton was one of the many guest stars in a television spectacular tribute to Rodgers and Hammerstein, The General Foods 25th Anniversary Show, which featured all the then-surviving stars (except Alfred Drake) of all the classic Broadway musicals that the team had written (1943–1954). Clayton and John Raitt, in full makeup and costume, performed "If I Loved You" (also known as the Bench Scene) from Carousel. Clayton during this period also played herself in an appearance on Peter Lawford's NBC sitcom Dear Phoebe.

While starring in Show Boat, Clayton met Robert Lerner, an heir to the women's clothing shops bearing his name. They were married and moved to California, where Lerner attended Loyola Law School and Clayton concentrated on mothering. "We had three children in three years", she said in a 1976 interview with People magazine. "Then came Lassie"; "I took it because I was dying to work."

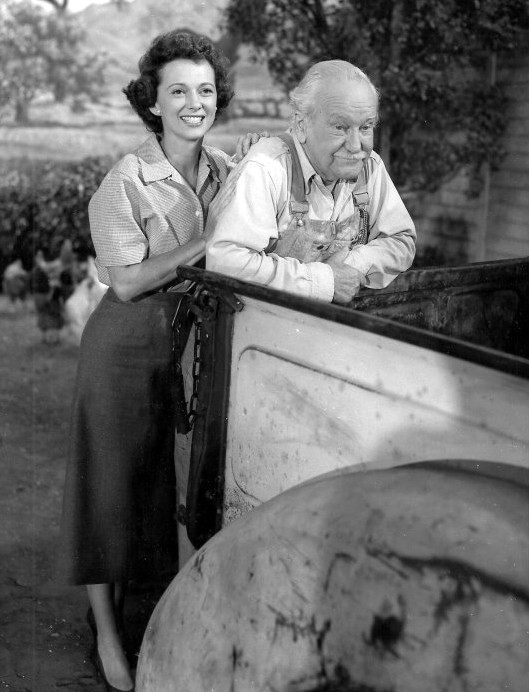
Clayton and George Cleveland in Lassie, 1954.

Clayton became known to TV audiences as the mother of Jeff Miller (Tommy Rettig) on the television series Lassie (a.k.a. Jeff's Collie in syndication reruns). Clayton played the first four seasons of Lassie, from September 1954 to December 1957, as Ellen Miller, a war widow living on her father-in-law's farm with her preteen son, Jeff, and her late husband's cantankerous old father, Gramps (played by the Canadian-born George Cleveland).

There were only a few times in Lassie when Clayton sang, most notably in the episode "The Gypsys" (Season 2, Ep. 15) in which she sang the song "Marushka".

Despite Lassie doing well with the TV audiences, Tommy Rettig sought release from his contract in the popular series' fourth season. Clayton quit the production as well at that time. "My home life was being absolutely wrecked," she explained. "I had four children and a husband, and I was always working".

Clayton appeared in only one more Lassie episode after those cast changes. In "Timmy's Family", broadcast originally in December 1957, she guest-starred in a supporting role to Lassie's new family.

Following her departure from Lassie, Clayton in 1959 starred in a TV pilot called The Jan Clayton Show, a sitcom in which she portrayed a college English teacher. She produced and starred the next year in The Brown Horse, another proposed series about a woman trying to pay for her daughter's college tuition by working in a San Francisco restaurant. Then, in 1961, she again starred in a comedy pilot based on Bess Streeter Aldrich's book Cheers for Miss Bishop. None of those three pilots was ever "picked up" or purchased by a sponsor for production as a weekly series.

Clayton also performed in the 1961 episode "The Prairie Story" on NBC's Wagon Train. The episode, written by Jean Holloway, examines how the harsh prairie causes havoc in the lives of some of the women on the wagon train. Robert Horton starred in this episode, which aired three months after the death of Ward Bond.

In the 1962 episode "St. Louis Woman" on NBC's The Tall Man, Clayton performed in the role of Janet Harper, a widow engaged to Tom Davis (Canadian-born Russ Conway), a friend of Sheriff Pat Garrett (Barry Sullivan). While Tom is away from Lincoln, New Mexico, the setting of The Tall Man, on a cattle drive, Janet begins to show a romantic interest in Garrett. Roger Mobley appears in this episode as David Harper, Janet's young son.

In 1964, she guest starred on Gunsmoke, portraying “Clara Wright”, a widow whose husband confesses to murder in S9E29’s “Bently”.

Of note, as the Gunsmoke episode “Bently” ends, “Chester Goode” respectfully escorts “Clara Wright” to the stage, making Jan Clayton the last actor of note (save for some unknown townspeople) to be seen on screen with Marshall Dillon’s beloved friend, as this marked actor Dennis Weaver’s final moment on the TV Western series. She returned to the series in 1965, playing “Mary Rice”, a mother with scurvy who sacrifices treatment in order to save her son, also ailing with the same disease, in “Gilt Guilt” (S10E31).

Clayton was posthumously inducted into the New Mexico Entertainment Hall of Fame in 2012.

== Affiliations ==
In the 1970s Clayton began receiving treatment for her alcoholism. "My drinking got worse after my daughter died," she explained in her 1976 People interview. "Before that I was a social drinker. But even then after a few drinks I'd get the sillies, then the cries and finally the meanies." She joined Alcoholics Anonymous in 1970 and helped counsel other alcoholics on how to reclaim their lives. Every Thursday, she worked as a volunteer answering the phone for the Alcoholism Council of Greater Los Angeles. She later became a board member in the organization.

== Death ==
Clayton died of cancer in West Hollywood, California, on August 28, 1983, just two days after her 66th birthday. Her ashes are buried next to the gravesite of her father at Fairview Cemetery in Tularosa, New Mexico.

== Filmography ==
Year	Title	Role	Notes
1938	Sunset Trail	Dorrie Marsh	
1938	In Old Mexico	Anita Gonzalez	
1939	The Llano Kid	Lupita Sandoval	
1940	The Showdown	Sue Willard	
1940	Flight Angels	Jane Morrow	
1940	Father Is a Prince	Connie Bower	
1941	Six-Gun Gold	Penny Blanchard	
1942	The Loves of Edgar Allan Poe	Poe's Young Mother	Uncredited
1945	This Man's Navy	Cathey Cortland	
1948	The Snake Pit	Singing Inmate	
1949	The Wolf Hunters	Renée	
