= The Calling of Dan Matthews =

1935 film directed by Phil Rosen

- Directed by: Phil Rosen
- Written by: Karl Brown; Daniel Jarrett; Don Swift; Harold Bell Wright (novel)
- Produced by: Sol Lesser
- Starring: Richard Arlen; Charlotte Wynters; Douglass Dumbrille
- Cinematography: Allen G. Siegler
- Music by: Mischa Bakaleinikoff
- Production company: Columbia Pictures
- Distributed by: Columbia Pictures
- Release date: December 10, 1935
- Running time: 67 minutes
- Country: United States
- Language: English

The Calling of Dan Matthews is a 1935 American crime film directed by Phil Rosen and starring Richard Arlen, Charlotte Wynters and Douglass Dumbrille. It was based on the novel of the same title by Harold Bell Wright.

== Cast ==
- Richard Arlen as Dan Matthews
- Charlotte Wynters as Hope Strong
- Douglass Dumbrille as Jeff Hardy
- Mary Kornman as Kitty Marley
- Donald Cook as Frank Blair
- Frederick Burton as James B. Strong
- Lee Moran as Hypo
- Tom Dugan as Herman
- Edward McWade as Lawyer Partington
- Carlyle Blackwell Jr. as Tommy
- Oscar Apfel as District Attorney
- Bess Flowers as Miss Ryan

== Bibliography ==
- Goble, Alan. The Complete Index to Literary Sources in Film. Walter de Gruyter, 1999.
