= Milton Carruth =

American film editor, director

- Born: March 23, 1899; Coronado, California, U.S.
- Died: September 7, 1972 (aged 73); Los Angeles, California, U.S.
- Occupation(s): Film editor, director
- Years active: 1929–1966

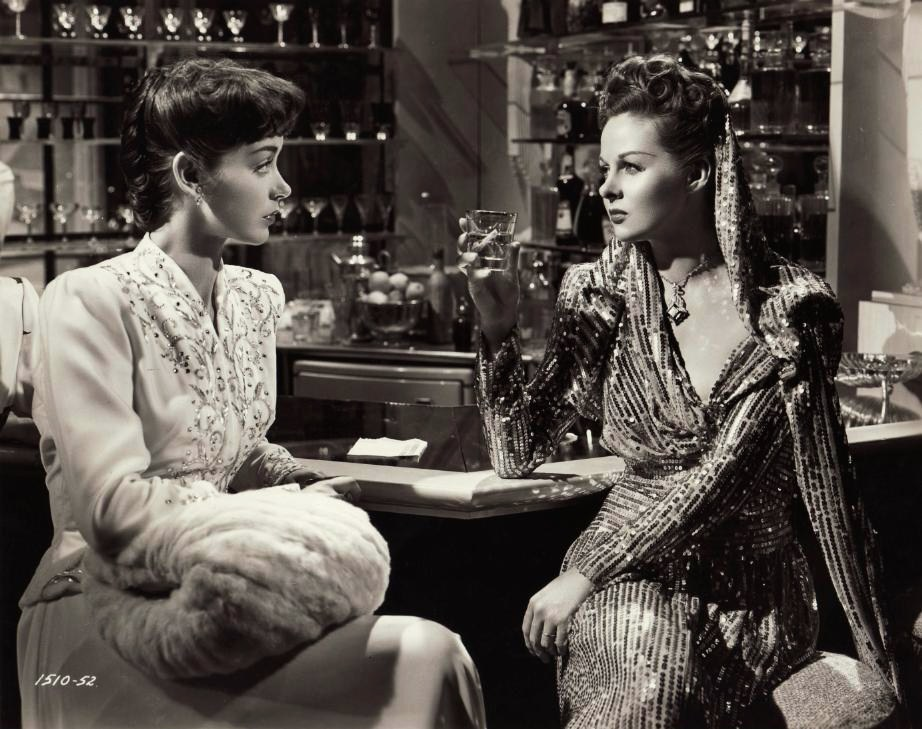
Marsha Hunt (left) & Susan Hayward in Smash-Up, the Story of a Woman - cropped screenshot

Milton Carruth (March 23, 1899 – September 7, 1972) was an American film editor and, for a period in the 1930s, film director. Among the 129 films he edited are All Quiet on the Western Front (directed by Lewis Milestone, 1930, silent version), Shadow of a Doubt (directed by Alfred Hitchcock, 1943), Pillow Talk (directed by Michael Gordon, 1959), and Imitation of Life (directed by Douglas Sirk, 1959). His career as an editor spanned from 1929 through 1966 (The Pad and How to Use It (directed by Brian G. Hutton, 1966).

In 1937 and 1938, he directed seven films: Love Letters of a Star, She's Dangerous, Breezing Home, The Man in Blue, Reported Missing!, The Lady Fights Back and Some Blondes Are Dangerous. Following these films, he returned to his "first love", which was film editing.

Carruth spent his entire career working at Universal Studios; he was "one of three editors who served as the core of Universal's editing department for a span of some forty years". He had been selected as a member of the American Cinema Editors.
