= Three of a Kind (1936 film) =

1936 film by Phil Rosen

- Directed by: Phil Rosen
- Written by: Arthur T. Horman
- Screenplay by: Arthur T. Horman
- Produced by: Maury M. Cohen
- Starring: See below
- Production company: Invincible Pictures
- Distributed by: Chesterfield Pictures
- Release date: 1936
- Running time: 73 minutes
- Country: United States
- Language: English

Three of a Kind is a 1936 American comedy film directed by Phil Rosen. It was made by Invincible Pictures Corporation which was later absorbed into Republic Pictures.

== Plot ==
Barbara Penfield tries to persuade her father, laundry magnate F. Thorndyke Penfield, to invest in a business venture proposed by her sweetheart Rodney Randall. Her father, knowing Randall to be a fortune hunter, refuses and stops her allowance and freezes her bank account. Undeterred from financing Randall, but lacking the cash, Barbara decides to trade in her expensive car for a very cheap one.

While she is out on a test drive with a salesman, her car is fraudulently sold by con man "Con" Cornelius who is loitering around the car yard. The buyer, Jerry Bassett, is a Penfield Company laundry worker who has just quit after winning best employee award and $1,000. He sets out for the Royal Valley holiday resort and on the road picks up Barbara who, after the cheap car broke down, is hitchhiking to a rendezvous there with Randall. She does not recognize her own car which Bassett is driving, and introduces herself using the false name Beatrice Payne.

Arriving at the Royal Valley, Bassett and "Beatrice" book into separate rooms. Later Cornelius and his daughter Prudence arrive. Bassett learns that Beatrice is really Barbara Penfield, the daughter of his ex-employer, and it is confirmed when Penfield himself arrives to put a stop to any further negotiation between her and Randall.

Several cases of mistaken identity result between Penfield, Randall, Cornelius, and Bassett, with almost everyone believing the other is rich and manoeuvering to make a deal with him. Meanwhile, police investigator Cogarty is on the trail of the fraudulently sold car and he recognizes ex-convict Cornelius and swindler Randall. Bassett is wrongly arrested for stealing the car, with police compounding the mistaken identity situation.

Prudence and Randall marry, and when all the identities are sorted out, Barbara and Bassett announce their intention to do the same and to manage the Penfield business when Penfield retires.

== Cast ==
- Evalyn Knapp as Barbara Penfield
- Chick Chandler as Jerry Bassett
- Berton Churchill as 'Con' Cornelius
- Richard Carle as F. Thorndyke Penfield
- Bradley Page as Rodney Randall
- Patricia Farr as Prudence Cornelius
- Lew Kelly as Police Sgt. Cogarty
- Pat West as Beef Smith
- Bryant Washburn as Mr. Grimwood
- Harry Bradley as Mr. Fash
- John Dilson as Doc Adams
- Billy Gilbert as The Tailor
