= Pinky (film) =

1949 film directed by Elia Kazan

- Theatrical release poster
- Directed by: Elia Kazan
- Written by: Philip Dunne; Dudley Nichols
- Based on: Quality by Cid Ricketts Sumner
- Produced by: Darryl F. Zanuck
- Starring: Jeanne Crain; Ethel Barrymore; Ethel Waters; William Lundigan
- Cinematography: Joseph MacDonald
- Edited by: Harmon Jones
- Music by: Alfred Newman
- Distributed by: 20th Century-Fox
- Release date: September 29, 1949
- Running time: 102 minutes
- Country: United States
- Language: English
- Box office: $3.8 million (rentals)

Pinky is a 1949 American drama film directed by Elia Kazan and produced by Darryl F. Zanuck. The screenplay was adapted by Philip Dunne and Dudley Nichols based on Cid Ricketts Sumner's 1946 novel Quality. It stars Jeanne Crain as the title character, a young light-skinned black woman who passes for white. It also stars Ethel Barrymore, Ethel Waters and William Lundigan.

Pinky was released in the United States on September 29, 1949, by 20th Century-Fox. It generated considerable controversy because of its subject of race relations and the casting of Crain to play a black woman. It was nonetheless a critical and commercial success, and earned Crain, Barrymore and Waters Academy Award nominations.

== Plot ==
Jeanne Crain and Ethel Waters

Pinky Johnson returns to the Southern United States to visit Dicey, the illiterate black laundress grandmother who raised her. Pinky confesses to Dicey that she passed for white while studying to be a nurse in the Northern United States. She had also fallen in love with a white man, Dr. Thomas Adams, who knows nothing about her black heritage.

Pinky is harassed by racist local law enforcement while attempting to reclaim money owed to her grandmother. Two white men try to sexually assault her. Dr. Canady, a black physician, asks Pinky to train black nursing students, but Pinky plans to return to the North.

Dicey asks Pinky to stay temporarily to care for her ailing, elderly white friend and neighbor Miss Em. Pinky has always disliked Miss Em and considers her another of the many bigots in the area. Pinky relents and agrees to tend Miss Em after learning that when Dicey had pneumonia, Miss Em cared for her. Pinky nurses the strong-willed Miss Em, but does not hide her resentment. However, as they spend time together, she grows to like and respect her patient.

Miss Em bequeaths Pinky her stately house and property when she dies, but greedy relative Melba Wooley challenges the will. Everyone advises Pinky that she has no chance of winning, but she begs Miss Em's old friend, retired judge Walker, to defend her in court. With great reluctance, he agrees to take the case. Pinky washes clothes by hand when her grandmother is sick in order to pay court expenses. At the trial, despite hostile white spectators and the absence of Dr. Adams, the only defense witness, presiding judge Shoreham unexpectedly rules in Pinky's favor. When Pinky thanks her attorney, he coldly informs her that justice was served, but not the interests of the community.

Tom, who has arrived from the North after tracking Pinky down, wants her to sell the inherited property, resume her masquerade as a white woman, marry him and leave the South, but she refuses, firmly believing that Miss Em intended her to use the house and property for some purpose, and Tom leaves. Pinky establishes a clinic and nursery school staffed by Dr. Canady's black nursing students on the property.

== Cast ==
- Jeanne Crain as Patricia "Pinky" Johnson
- Ethel Barrymore as Miss Em
- Ethel Waters as Dicey Johnson
- William Lundigan as Dr. Thomas "Tom" Adams
- Basil Ruysdael as Judge Walker
- Kenny Washington as Dr. Canady
- Nina Mae McKinney as Rozelia
- Griff Barnett as Dr. Joe McGill
- Frederick O'Neal as Jake Walters
- Evelyn Varden as Melba Wooley
- Raymond Greenleaf as Judge Shoreham
- Juanita Moore as Nurse
- Arthur Hunnicutt as Police Chief (uncredited)
- Harry Tenbrook as Townsman (uncredited)

== Production ==
John Ford was originally hired to direct the film but was replaced after one week because producer Darryl F. Zanuck was unhappy with the dailies.

Both Lena Horne and Dorothy Dandridge were interested in playing the role of Pinky. In the end, Jeanne Crain was chosen. Elia Kazan, who assumed directing duties when John Ford was fired, was unhappy with the casting choice, and later said, "Jeanne Crain was a sweet girl, but she was like a Sunday school teacher. I did my best with her, but she didn't have any fire. The only good thing about her was that it went so far in the direction of no temperament that you felt Pinky was floating through all of her experiences without reacting to them, which is what 'passing' is."

== Banning and Supreme Court ruling ==
Pinky enjoyed wide success in the southern United States, but was banned by the city of Marshall, Texas, for its subject matter. In Marshall, W. L. Gelling managed the segregated Paramount Theater, where blacks were restricted to the balcony. Gelling booked Pinky for exhibition in February 1950, a year in which the First Amendment did not protect movies, subsequent to Mutual Film Corporation v. Industrial Commission of Ohio (1915).

Marshall's city commission "reactivated" the Board of Censors, established by a 1921 ordinance, and designated five members who demanded the submission of the picture for approval. They disapproved its showing, stating that it was "prejudicial to the best interests of the citizens of the City of Marshall." Gelling exhibited the film anyway and was charged with a misdemeanor. Three board members testified that they objected to the picture because it depicted a white man retaining his love for a woman after learning that she was a Negro, a white man kissing and embracing a Negro woman and two white ruffians assaulting Pinky after she tells them that she is colored.

Gelling was convicted and fined $200. He appealed the conviction to the U.S. Supreme Court. In the case of W. L. Gelling v. State of Texas 343 U.S. 960 (1952), the Court then overturned Gelling's conviction based on the free-speech protections given to movies in the recently decided case of Joseph Burstyn, Inc v. Wilson (1952).

In a concurring opinion, Justice William O. Douglas wrote that the Marshall city ordinance was unconstitutional as it represented prior restraint on free speech. "The evil of prior restraint, condemned...by Burstyn v. Wilson, 343 U.S. 495, 72 S.Ct. 777, in the case of motion pictures, is present here in flagrant form. If a board of censors can tell the American people what it is in their best interests to see or to read or to hear...then thought is regimented, authority substituted for liberty, and the great purpose of the First Amendment to keep uncontrolled the freedom of expression defeated." In his own concurring opinion, Justice Felix Frankfurter wrote, "This ordinance offends the Due Process Clause of the Fourteenth Amendment on the score of indefiniteness."

== Box-office performance ==
Pinky was 20th Century-Fox's second-most-successful film of 1949 (after I Was a Male War Bride) and the year's sixth-highest-grossing.

== Award nominations ==
Award	Category	Nominee(s)	Result	Ref.
Academy Awards	Best Actress	Jeanne Crain	Nominated	
Academy Awards	Best Supporting Actress	Ethel Barrymore	Nominated	
Academy Awards	Best Supporting Actress	Ethel Waters	Nominated	
Writers Guild of America Awards	Best Written Film Concerning American Scene	Philip Dunne and Dudley Nichols	Nominated	

== See also ==
- 1949 in film
- List of black Academy Award winners and nominees
- List of movies with more than one Academy Award nomination in the same category
