= Helldorado (film) =

1934 film directed by James Cruze

- Directed by: James Cruze
- Screenplay by: Philip Dunne; Frances Hyland; Rex Taylor
- Story by: Frank Mitchell Dazey
- Produced by: Jesse L. Lasky
- Starring: Richard Arlen; Madge Evans; Ralph Bellamy; James Gleason; Helen Jerome Eddy; Henry B. Walthall
- Cinematography: John F. Seitz
- Edited by: Harold D. Schuster
- Production company: Fox Film Corporation
- Distributed by: Fox Film Corporation
- Release date: December 21, 1934
- Running time: 74 minutes
- Country: United States
- Language: English

Helldorado is a 1934 American drama film directed by James Cruze and written by Philip Dunne, Frances Hyland, and Rex Taylor. The film stars Richard Arlen, Madge Evans, Ralph Bellamy, James Gleason, Helen Jerome Eddy and Henry B. Walthall. The film was released on December 21, 1934, by Fox Film Corporation.

== Cast ==
- Richard Arlen as Art Ryan
- Madge Evans as Glenda Wynant
- Ralph Bellamy as J.F. Van Avery
- James Gleason as Sam Barnes
- Helen Jerome Eddy as Miss Fife
- Henry B. Walthall as Abner Meadows
- Gertrude Short as Mae
- Patricia Farr as Flo
- Stanley Fields as truck driver
- Philip Hurlic as Sam Ed
- Stepin Fetchit as Ulysses
- Lester Dorr as newspaper reporter
