= Reformatory (film) =

1938 film directed by Lewis D. Collins

- Directed by: Lewis D. Collins
- Written by: Gordon Rigby
- Produced by: Larry Darmour
- Starring: Jack Holt; Bobby Jordan; Charlotte Wynters
- Cinematography: James S. Brown Jr.
- Edited by: Dwight Caldwell
- Music by: Lee Zahler
- Production company: Larry Darmour Productions
- Distributed by: Columbia Pictures
- Release date: June 20, 1938
- Running time: 61 minutes
- Country: United States
- Language: English

Reformatory is a 1938 American crime drama film directed by Lewis D. Collins and starring Jack Holt, Bobby Jordan and Charlotte Wynters.

== Plot ==
The inmates at a juvenile detention institution plan a mass breakout, despite the attempts of a new superintendent to bring in a more liberal regime.

== Cast ==
- Jack Holt as Robert Dean
- Bobby Jordan as Pinkey Leonard
- Charlotte Wynters as Adele Webster
- Grant Mitchell as Arnold Frayne
- Tommy Bupp as Fibber Regan
- Frankie Darro as Louie Miller
- Ward Bond as Mac Grady
- Sheila Bromley as Mrs. Regan
- Vernon Dent as Cook Howard
- Greta Granstedt as Millie
- Paul Everton as Gov. Spaulding
- Lloyd Ingraham as Doctor Blakely
- Joe Caits as Jim Leonard

== Bibliography ==
- Timothy Shary & Robin Mcinnes. Teen Movies: American Youth on Screen. Wallflower Press, 2005.
