= Tomboy (1940 film) =

- Theatrical release poster
- Directed by: Robert F. McGowan
- Screenplay by: Dorothy Davenport; Marion Orth
- Produced by: William T. Lackey
- Starring: Marcia Mae Jones; Jackie Moran; Grant Withers; Charlotte Wynters; George Cleveland; Marvin Stephens
- Cinematography: Harry Neumann
- Edited by: Russell F. Schoengarth
- Production company: Monogram Pictures
- Distributed by: Monogram Pictures
- Release date: April 20, 1940
- Running time: 70 minutes
- Country: United States
- Language: English

Tomboy is a 1940 American romance film directed by Robert F. McGowan and written by Dorothy Davenport and Marion Orth. The film stars Marcia Mae Jones, Jackie Moran, Grant Withers, Charlotte Wynters, George Cleveland and Marvin Stephens. The film was released on April 20, 1940, by Monogram Pictures.

== Cast ==
- Marcia Mae Jones as Pat Kelly
- Jackie Moran as Steve
- Grant Withers as Charlie Kelly
- Charlotte Wynters as Frances
- George Cleveland as Matt
- Marvin Stephens as Harry
- Clara Blandick as Martha
- Gene Morgan as First Tramp
