= Cipher Bureau (film) =

- Directed by: Charles Lamont
- Written by: Arthur Hoerl, from a Monroe Shaff story
- Produced by: Franklyn Warner
- Cinematography: Arthur Martinelli
- Distributed by: Grand National Pictures
- Release date: October 26, 1938
- Running time: 64 minutes
- Country: United States
- Language: English

Cipher Bureau is a 1938 American film directed by Charles Lamont. The film was successful enough to elicit a sequel, Panama Patrol.

== Plot ==
Philip Waring, the head of a listening agency in Washington D.C., is dedicated to breaking up a foreign radio-spy ring. He enlists his naval-officer brother and tangles with beautiful spies.

== Cast ==
- Leon Ames as Philip Waring
- Charlotte Wynters as Helen Lane
- Joan Woodbury as Therese Brahm
- Don Dillaway as Paul Waring
- Gustav von Seyffertitz as Albert Grood
- Tenen Holtz as Simon Herrick
- Walter Bonn as Anton Decker
- Si Wills as Lt. Clarke
- George Lynn as Lt. Tydall
- Jason Robards as Ellsworth
- Sidney Miller as Jimmy
- Hooper Atchley as Commander Nash
- Robert Frazer as Paul's counsel
