= Pride of the Navy =

1939 film by Charles Lamont

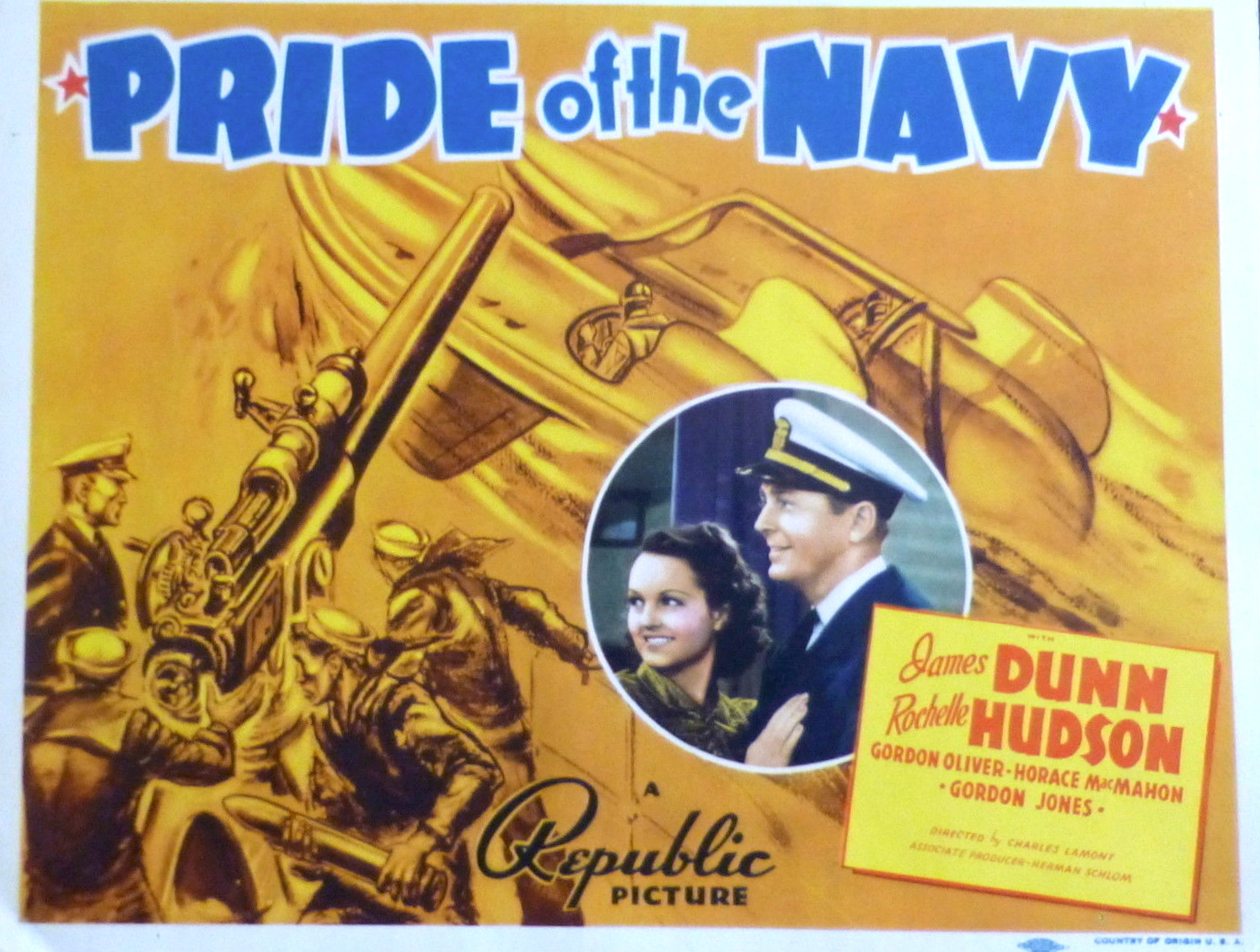
- Lobby card
- Directed by: Charles Lamont
- Screenplay by: Ben Markson; Saul Elkins
- Story by: James Webb; Joseph Hoffman
- Produced by: Herman Schlom
- Starring: James Dunn; Rochelle Hudson; Gordon Oliver; Horace McMahon; Gordon Jones; Charlotte Wynters
- Cinematography: Jack A. Marta
- Edited by: Edward Mann
- Music by: Cy Feuer; William Lava
- Production company: Republic Pictures
- Distributed by: Republic Pictures
- Release date: January 23, 1939
- Running time: 60 minutes
- Country: United States
- Language: English

Pride of the Navy is a 1939 American action film directed by Charles Lamont and written by Ben Markson and Saul Elkins. The film stars James Dunn, Rochelle Hudson, Gordon Oliver, Horace McMahon, Gordon Jones and Charlotte Wynters. The film was released on January 23, 1939, by Republic Pictures.

== Cast ==
- James Dunn as Speed Brennan
- Rochelle Hudson as Gloria Tyler
- Gordon Oliver as Jerry Richards
- Horace McMahon as Gloomey Kelly
- Gordon Jones as Joe Falcon
- Charlotte Wynters as Mrs. Falcon
- Joseph Crehan as Brad Foster
- Charles Trowbridge as Capt. Tyler
