= Strange Faces =

1938 film directed by Errol Taggart

- Theatrical release poster
- Directed by: Errol Taggart
- Screenplay by: Charles Grayson
- Story by: Cornelius Reece; Arndt Giusti
- Produced by: Burt Kelly
- Starring: Frank Jenks; Dorothea Kent; Andy Devine; Leon Ames; Mary Treen; Frank M. Thomas
- Cinematography: Elwood Bredell
- Edited by: Charles Maynard
- Music by: Charles Previn
- Production company: Universal Pictures
- Distributed by: Universal Pictures
- Release date: November 13, 1938
- Running time: 65 minutes
- Country: United States
- Language: English

Strange Faces is a 1938 American drama film directed by Errol Taggart and written by Charles Grayson. The film stars Frank Jenks, Dorothea Kent, Andy Devine, Leon Ames, Mary Treen and Frank M. Thomas. The film was released on November 13, 1938, by Universal Pictures.

== Cast ==
- Frank Jenks as Nick Denby
- Dorothea Kent as Maggie Moore
- Andy Devine as Hector Hobbs
- Leon Ames as Joe Gurney
- Mary Treen as Lorry May
- Frank M. Thomas as Ward
- Spencer Charters as Mason City Sheriff
- Joe King as Police Lt. Hennigan
- Renie Riano as Mrs. Keller
- Frank Jaquet as Henry Evans
- Frances Robinson as Girl in café
- Eddie "Rochester" Anderson as William
- Mark Daniels as Young man in café
