= Tars and Stripes =

1935 film

- Directed by: Buster Keaton; Charles Lamont
- Produced by: E.H. Allen; E. W. Hammons
- Starring: Buster Keaton
- Cinematography: Dwight Warren
- Production company: Educational Pictures
- Distributed by: Metro-Goldwyn-Mayer
- Release date: May 3, 1935
- Running time: 20 minutes
- Country: United States
- Language: English

Tars and Stripes is a 1935 American Educational Pictures short comedy film directed by and starring Buster Keaton. The film was shot at Naval Training Center San Diego, California.

== Plot ==
At a Navy training station, Apprentice Seaman Elmer Doolittle is constantly mocked and berated due to his constant clumsiness and lack of common sense. He is frequently given mundane tasks to complete in order to keep him away from the other apprentices with actual potential but Chief Gunners Mate Richard Mack vows to make a sailor out of him if it kills him. After failing to teaching how to tie knots or march properly, Mack becomes angered after he believes he witnesses Elmer flirting with his girlfriend when in actuality he was just helping fix her broken shoe. Elmer eventually reaches the rank of seaman but Mack's girlfriend eventually does develop feelings for Elmer and this enrages Mack who banishes Elmer to the brig and tells him he will stay there. Elmer dismays but soon perks up after realizing Mack's girlfriend has snuck into the brig as well.

== Cast ==
- Buster Keaton as Apprentice Seaman Elmer Doolittle
- Vernon Dent as Chief Gunners Mate Richard Mack
- Dorothea Kent as Mack's Girlfriend

== See also ==
- Buster Keaton filmography
