= Panama Patrol =

1939 film directed by Charles Lamont

- Poster for the film
- Directed by: Charles Lamont
- Written by: Arthur Hoerl
- Produced by: Charles Lamont
- Starring: Leon Ames; Charlotte Wynters; Adrienne Ames
- Cinematography: Arthur Martinelli
- Edited by: Bernard Loftus
- Music by: David Chudnow
- Production company: Fine Arts Pictures
- Distributed by: Grand National Films
- Release date: May 20, 1939 (US)
- Running time: 67 minutes
- Country: United States
- Language: English

Panama Patrol is a 1939 American drama film. Directed by Charles Lamont, the film stars Leon Ames, Charlotte Wynters, and Adrienne Ames, it was released on May 20, 1939. The film was known during production by the working titles of Curio Cipher and Panama Cipher.

== Plot ==
Major Phillip Waring, the head of the Cipher Bureau in Washington, D. C., is called away on the day of his wedding to secretary Helen Lane by an urgent request to decipher a diplomatic message intercepted from an international spy ring.

Waring and his assistant, Lieutenant Murdock, track down one of the spies, but he is shot before they are able to question him.

With the spy's death, their only clue is a letter written in Chinese, which they give to Bureau interpreter Artie Johnson to decipher. Unknown to Waring, Johnson is the clandestine leader of the spy ring, and the interpreter gives Waring information that leads him into a trap at the Maing curio shop.

When Waring fails to return from his mission, Murdock goes to the shop and rescues him. While at the shop, Waring discovers another letter, and when asked to interpret it, Johnson cleverly changes one of the letters in the code by means of a blotter.

Johnson's information sends Waring and Murdock to California on a wild goose chase. In their absence, however, Helen finds Johnson's blotter and realizes that he is involved in the spy ring. While confronting Johnson at his house, Helen is taken captive by the ring.

Meanwhile, Waring realizes that his mission is a frame-up, and returns to Washington to discover Helen's peril. Arriving at Johnson's house just after the spies have left with Helen, Waring discovers the final part of the code, which reveals the spy's plan to impede traffic traveling through the Panama Canal.

The cipher also discloses the location of the spy headquarters, and Waring and Murdock arrive just in time to rescue Helen and smash the spy ring.

== Cast ==
- Leon Ames as Major Phillip Waring
- Charlotte Wynters as Helen Lane
- Adrienne Ames as Lia Maing
- Weldon Heyburn as Lt. Murdock
- Abner Biberman as Artie Johnson
- Sidney Miller as Jimmy
- Jack Smart as Eli Maing
- Donald Barry as Lt. Loring
- Hugh McArthur as Lt. Everett
- William Von Brincken as Marlin
