= Lew Kelly =

American actor (1879–1944)

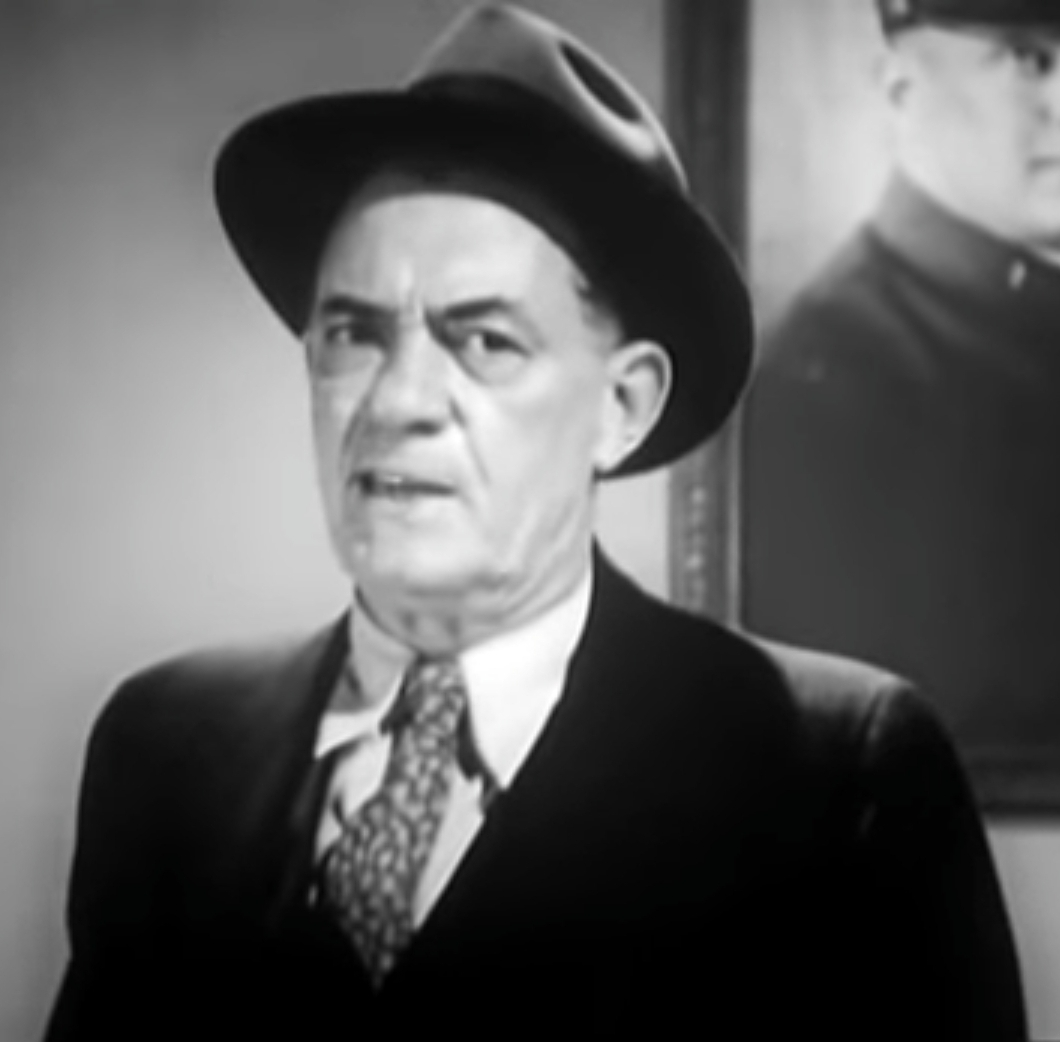
- Kelly in Lady Luck (1936)
- Born: August 24, 1879; St. Louis, Missouri, U.S.
- Died: June 10, 1944 (aged 64); Los Angeles, California, U.S.
- Resting place: California
- Occupation: Actor
- Years active: 1928–1944

Lew Kelly (August 24, 1879 – June 10, 1944) was an American stage and film actor. He appeared in more than 200 films between 1928 and 1944. He was born Louis Kelly in St. Louis, Missouri, and died in Los Angeles, California.

== Selected filmography ==
- Barnum Was Right (1929)
- The Woman Racket (1930)
- I Take This Woman (1931)
- The Devil Plays (1931)
- Lady and Gent (1932)
- The Devil Horse (1932)
- Vanity Street (1932)
- Laughter in Hell (1933)
- State Trooper (1933)
- The Meanest Gal in Town (1934)
- What's Your Racket? (1934)
- One in a Million (1934)
- The Lady in Scarlet (1935)
- Mississippi (1935)
- Three of a Kind (1936)
- Winds of the Wasteland (1936)
- Lady Luck (1936)
- Wanted! Jane Turner (1936)
- It Happened Out West (1937)
- Lawless Valley (1938)
- Three Texas Steers (1939)
- Road Agent (1941)
- The Little Foxes (1941)
- Spook Louder (1943)
