= Way of a Gaucho =

1952 film by Jacques Tourneur

- Theatrical release poster
- Directed by: Jacques Tourneur
- Screenplay by: Philip Dunne
- Based on: The novel Way of a Gaucho by Herbert Childs
- Produced by: Philip Dunne
- Starring: Gene Tierney; Rory Calhoun; Richard Boone
- Cinematography: Harry Jackson
- Edited by: Robert Fritch
- Music by: Sol Kaplan
- Color process: Technicolor
- Production company: 20th Century Fox
- Distributed by: 20th Century Fox
- Release date: October 16, 1952
- Running time: 91 minutes
- Country: United States
- Language: English
- Budget: $2.239 million
- Box office: $1.4 million (US rentals)

Way of a Gaucho is a 1952 American Western drama film directed by Jacques Tourneur and starring Gene Tierney and Rory Calhoun. It was written by Philip Dunne and based on a novel by Herbert Childs.

The film was made by 20th Century Fox and shot on location in Argentina. It was one of a growing trend of runaway productions which saw American production shift away from Hollywood to other countries, particularly Britain and Italy, where the Hollywood studios had large amounts of money frozen because of currency controls. During World War II the Argentinian market had remained open to Hollywood films and Fox had built up significant earnings which they were unable to spend outside the country.

The film failed to make a profit on its release. The story portrays the adventures of an Argentine rebel gaucho, a South American cattleman considered a variant of the Mexican vaquero and the American cowboy.

== Plot ==
In 1875 Argentina, a young gaucho, Martin Penalosa, kills another man in a duel. His prison sentence is commuted to joining the army. He serves under the tough Major Salinas, but soon grows tired of military life and deserts. He adopts the Nom de guerre Valverde and leads a band of gauchos to resist the increasing encroachment of railroad agents into the Pampas.

In the meantime Salinas quits the army and becomes chief of police, so he can continue his vendetta against him. After falling in love with an aristocratic woman, Martin decides to escape with her to Chile, crossing the Andes on horseback. On the way Teresa tells him that she is pregnant, so they decide to return and get married instead, because of her safety and that for them is inconceivable for the child to be raised without a legitimate last name.

When they arrive at the cathedral, the police follow them so Martin has to escape again, leaving Teresa in the care of Father Fernandez. That night Martin's childhood friend Miguel talks with Teresa about a deal he reached with the Governor, in which Martin voluntarily turns himself in, in exchange for a 3-year prison sentence and a clean slate.

Teresa tells Miguel where Martin is hiding, but Salinas also follows, prompting a horse chase through a cattle run, that causes Miguel to fall from his horse and be trampled to death by the herd. That same night, Martin returns filled with guilt to meet Teresa and while she offers to escape to Brazil or Europe, he declines and tells her to meet him at noon at the cathedral. The next day Father Fernandez arranges a meeting alone with Salinas, where Martin agrees to turn himself in and face the consequences of his actions, as long as he can first marry Teresa as a free man.

== Cast ==
- Rory Calhoun as Martin Penalosa
- Gene Tierney as Teresa Chavez
- Richard Boone as Maj. Salinas
- Hugh Marlowe as Don Miguel Aleondo
- Everett Sloane as Falcon

== Production ==
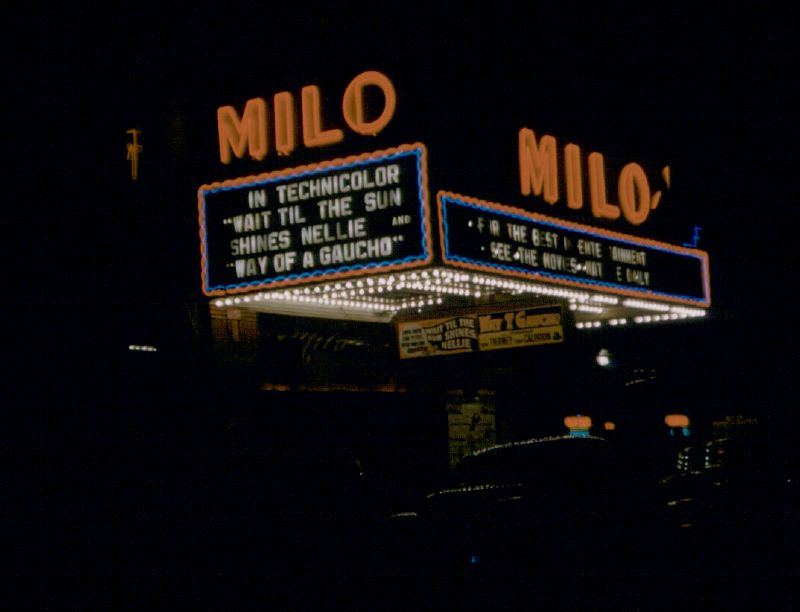
Film being shown at a cinema in Chicago

=== Development ===
The film was based on a novel by Herbert Childs which was published in 1948. The New York Times called it an "admirable first novel".

20th Century Fox bought the film rights in July 1950. Henry King was the original director assigned and it was hoped to star Tyrone Power. Philip Dunne wrote the script and in January 1951 he was promoted to producer. (Fox often promoted writers to producers – such as Charles Brackett, Lamar Trotti and Nunnally Johnson.)

By March there was talks that Power would no longer star. Then in May King, who wanted to direct another movie, was replaced by Jacques Tourneur, who had just signed a long-term contract with the studio.

The studio wanted Power to star, but he was unhappy with continually being cast in period movies. He refused to star in Lydia Bailey and was put on suspension by Fox, which meant he missed out on Gaucho. (Power would later come to terms with the studio and appear in Diplomatic Courier.) In August the lead role was given to Rory Calhoun, who the studio were grooming for stardom. "I've had my eye on Rory for several years", said Darryl Zanuck, head of Fox, "but he was under contract to another studio."

The female lead was given to Jean Peters. The third lead was given to Richard Boone, who had made a number of movies for Fox.

Dunne and Tourneur left for South America in late August to do location filming. Dunne estimated the budget would be around $2 million.

Peters asked to be excused from the film for ill health and was replaced by Gene Tierney.

=== Shooting ===
There were political disturbances in Argentina before and during filming but it was decided to proceed anyway. Filming began October 8, 1951.

Apart from the leading parts, English-speaking Argentine actors were hired. The film's production was troubled, in part because of a tense relationship between the filmmakers and the Peronist government of Argentina. The story is freely based on the epic poem Martín Fierro (1872 and 1879) by Argentine poet, politician and journalist José Hernández. The film's producer and screenwriter Philip Dunne observed that Juan Perón's followers "had made the legendary gaucho, then almost extinct, a national hero and symbol of their own aggressive nationalism" and the script was closely monitored by the Minister of Information Raul Apold. The budget overran by $413,000 and eventually cost $2,239,000.

"We believe we've got a good picture", said Dunne towards the end of the shoot. "The scenery has been magnificent and Darryl Zanuck gave me some of his best people to work with. We've made everything authentic for the period... We were budgeted for $2 million for the picture, about half in dollars, half in pesos. But we didn't make the picture here just to use blocked pesos. Zanuck told me he wanted to make a great picture. He got one."

== Legacy ==
The making of a Gaucho film in Argentina by a major United States film studio inspired the local studios to make a Western movie in Argentina for the first time. El último cow-boy (The Last Cowboy) is the result, an Argentinian black and white film directed by Juan Sires, based on the script by Eric Della Valle and Miguel Petruccelli, that premiered on February 25, 1954, and had as its cast: Augusto Codeca, Hector Calcaño, Hector Quintanilla and Pedro Laxalt. The film was initially going to be called "Camino del Cow-boy" (The Way of The Cowboy), seeking to replicate in jocular form Tourneur's Camino del Gaucho/Way of a Gaucho.

== Bibliography ==
- Fujiwara, Chris. Jacques Tourneur: The Cinema of Nightfall. McFarland & Co, 1998.
- Lev, Peter. The Fifties: Transforming the Screen 1950–1959. University of California Press, 2003.
- Solomon, Aubrey. Twentieth Century-Fox: A Corporate and Financial History. Scarecrow Press, 1988.
