= Eleanor Keaton =

American dancer and variety show performer (1918–1998)

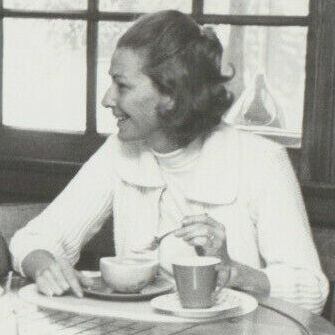
- Keaton in 1965
- Born: Eleanor Ruth Norris; July 29, 1918; Los Angeles, California, U.S.
- Died: October 19, 1998 (aged 80); Los Angeles, California, U.S.
- Occupations: Dancer; variety show performer
- Spouse: Buster Keaton (m. 1940; died 1966)
- Relatives: Joe Keaton (father-in-law); Myra Keaton (mother-in-law)

Eleanor Ruth Keaton (née Norris; July 29, 1918 – October 19, 1998) was an American dancer and variety show performer. She was an MGM contract dancer in her teens and became the third wife of silent-film comedian Buster Keaton at the age of 21, when Keaton was 44. She is credited with rehabilitating her husband's life and career. The two performed at the Cirque Medrano in Paris and on European tours in the 1950s; she also performed with him on The Buster Keaton Show in the early 1950s. After his death in 1966, she helped ensure Keaton's legacy by giving many interviews to biographers, film historians, and journalists, sharing details from his personal life and career, and also attended film festivals and celebrations honoring Keaton. In her later years, she bred champion St. Bernard dogs, was a gag consultant for Hollywood filmmakers, and was an invited speaker at silent-film screenings.

== Early life and career ==
Eleanor Ruth Norris was born in the Hollywood neighborhood of Los Angeles in 1918. She was the elder of two daughters of Ralph and Jessie Norris. Her father, a studio electrician for Warner Brothers, died in a fall from a scaffold in January 1929, aged 37. Her mother raised her and her sister on a small pension from the studio. Norris later said that she matured quickly after her father's death and became "a pretty direct and straightforward young lady".

Norris took dance lessons as a child and dropped out of school at age 15 to join a nightclub act called Six Blondes from Hollywood, which toured internationally. At age 17, she worked as a dancer in the New York nightclub of Harry Richman, and also became a contract dancer for Metro-Goldwyn-Mayer (MGM) studios. She appeared in the chorus of several MGM musicals, including Born to Dance (1936) and Rosalie (1937).

== Marriage to Buster Keaton ==
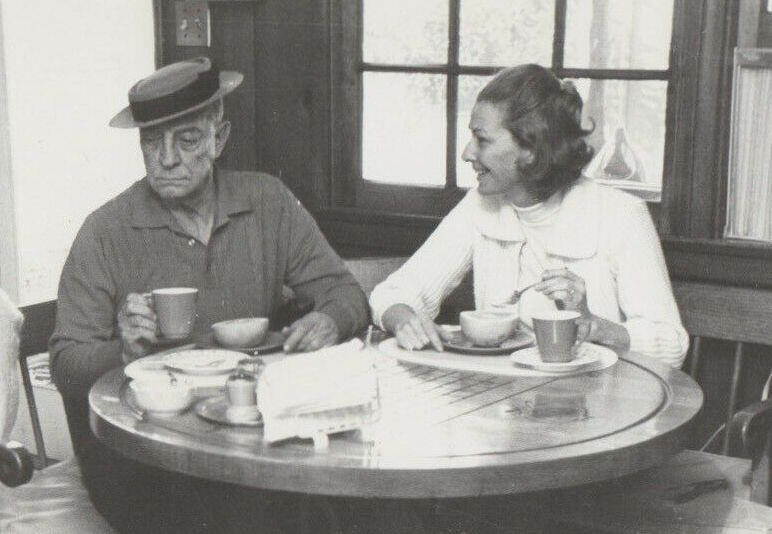
Buster and Eleanor Keaton in 1965

What I liked best about Buster was that he was easy to live with and fun to work with.

— Eleanor Keaton

Norris became acquainted with Buster Keaton in 1938 when she was looking to improve her bridge game. Keaton was known as "one of the best bridge players in Hollywood", and a friend introduced her to the game at Keaton's house in Cheviot Hills. Norris later said that she sat at Keaton's bridge game a few nights a week for over a year without interacting with her host. One time, however, she snapped back at another player who "made a nasty remark" about a card she had played, and Keaton raised his eyes and noticed her. They dated for about a year before he proposed marriage.

With his independent filmmaking career taken from him, two failed marriages, most of his money gone, and a history of alcoholism, Keaton, 42 years old when they met in 1938, was quite the opposite of the pretty and popular Eleanor, then aged 19. Keaton was working at MGM as a gag writer, producing comedy routines for the Marx Brothers and others at a salary of $200 a week. He spent his free time playing cards with friends. Though at first glance he seemed "old and sad and forbidding", Norris discovered that he was kind, gentle, and patient. She sensed that she could give Keaton what he needed: not just a wife, but "a combination valet, cook, housekeeper, bill payer, and constant reminder". John C. Tibbetts noted in his interview with her that she possessed "the kind of sturdy independence, inner reserve and genuine caring nature that must have appealed to Buster". Friends of both Keaton and Norris warned her against the marriage; she recalled: "They said he had had enough trouble in his life without adding me; and that I should go away and leave him alone". In his autobiography, My Wonderful World of Slapstick, Keaton wrote that his friends were more worried about him than Eleanor. But the couple went ahead and married on May 29, 1940.

The couple moved into Buster's mother's home and Eleanor ran the household for the three of them. In a few years' time, Buster began supporting his sister Louise and brother Harry, along with Harry's wife and two children, who also moved in with them. Eleanor said that neither she nor Buster wanted to have children, explaining, "I figured I'd raised him and that was enough". Eleanor told Tibbetts that Buster was generally good about controlling his drinking, and that together they decided that he could have a "cocktail hour" before dinner. She said he drank two beers before dinner for the rest of his life.

== European tours ==
As theater attendance decreased after World War II, MGM laid off its chorus members, including Eleanor Keaton in 1953. However, a new career began for both her and Buster in Europe when the Cirque Medrano invited Buster to perform in Paris in 1947. The act, his first vaudeville performance in 30 years, featured the couple in a routine called "putting a drunk woman to bed":

[The] routine involved Keaton trying to get his intoxicated wife into bed without waking her up. Her totally inert body refuses to respond to his wishes, constantly sliding into grotesque positions. When he finally gets her into a chair she slides off it, and when he puts her on the bed and tries to roll her over, she rolls off onto the floor again. After several minutes of hilarious pantomime, he finally gets the girl into bed and the bed collapses to the floor.

The act was well-received and well-paying: Keaton received $1,500 per performance at the Cirque Medrano. The Keatons also appeared on variety bills in Italy, Scotland, and England. They spent about six months a year performing in Europe in the 1950s. Eleanor also performed with her husband on The Buster Keaton Show in the early 1950s. In 1957, the couple performed in a U.S. national tour of Once Upon a Mattress. On April 3, 1957, they appeared on the reality television documentary show This Is Your Life; she helped arrange the appearance of Buster's sister, brother, sons, and notable contemporaries.

Eleanor accompanied Buster to all of his engagements and location shooting for his films. He performed in state fairs in Michigan, Iowa, Minnesota, Kansas, Tennessee, and Alabama; in fact, it was on a return trip from the Kansas State Fair that Eleanor, driving while Buster dozed, stopped the car when she realized they were in Piqua and introduced him to the place he had been born while his parents were touring in a medicine show. The couple also traveled nearly 5,000 mi (8,000 km) across Canada for the filming of The Railrodder and the accompanying documentary Buster Keaton Rides Again.

Eleanor was widely credited with rehabilitating Buster's life and career. In his authorized biography, Keaton, Rudi Blesh praised Eleanor for having buoyed her husband through career setbacks and encouraging him to keep plying his talents on television and in film. He wrote:

[S]he has seen Buster Keaton through a long period of painful adjustment, relapse, and readjustment and a dozen partial comebacks. She has carried him, content and at times happy, across the threshold of his seventies. She has lived with the most difficult and tragic of human beings, the exiled and estranged artist. Through it all she has retained both love and admiration for him".

In their leisure time, the couple played bridge, basketball, and went camping together. In 1957, Buster received $50,000 (equivalent to $690,000 in 2025) from Paramount Pictures for the rights to his life story. Though The Buster Keaton Story (1957) was more fiction than fact, the money enabled Keaton to buy a ranch house on 1.25 acres (0.51 ha) in the San Fernando Valley.

== Later life ==
I enjoy helping perpetuate his name. I think he deserves it. I'd prefer the younger generation heard of him and the older generation didn't forget.

— Eleanor Keaton, 1998

Buster Keaton died on February 1, 1966. After his death, Eleanor worked to ensure his legacy. She attended film festivals and film screenings celebrating his work around the world. She gave many interviews to journalists, biographers, and film historians, speaking candidly about her husband's personality, opinions, career, and their life together. She appeared in the television documentaries Buster Keaton: A Hard Act to Follow (1987) and Buster Keaton: Genius in Slapshoes (1995). Her presence at the second and third annual Buster Keaton Celebration in Iola, Kansas, in 1994 and 1995 helped legitimize the event. She was later honored as a recipient of The Buster, an award given by the International Buster Keaton Society.

In 1995, the centenary of Buster's birth, film retrospectives and conferences were held in the U.S. and Canada. Eleanor attended events in Berlin, Rio de Janeiro, New York, Los Angeles, Muskegon, Michigan, and Piqua, Kansas.

In June 1998, Keaton donated more than 900 items of her husband's personal memorabilia from 1938 to 1966 to the Margaret Herrick Library of the Academy of Motion Picture Arts and Sciences at the urging of biographer Jeffrey Vance, who argued that these materials should be preserved in an archive rather than in the hands of private collectors or sold at auction. This memorabilia included "very early original vintage photographs from Keaton's infancy, childhood, and vaudeville days, as well as a Keaton family photo album of snapshots dating from 1909 to 1917". Keaton also gifted film stills and other memorabilia to the Buster Keaton Memorial Museum in Piqua. She contributed many stories and personal photographs to Vance for his 2001 coffee-table book Buster Keaton Remembered.

Keaton also owned a pet shop and bred St. Bernard dogs descended from one of Buster's pets. Some of these dogs appeared in the Beethoven film series. After closing her shop in 1983, she volunteered as a docent at the Greater Los Angeles Zoo. She also served as a gag consultant for Hollywood filmmakers such as Mel Brooks, and was invited to speak at silent-film screenings, such as the annual Last Remaining Seats film series at the Los Angeles Conservancy.

== Memberships and affiliations ==
Keaton was an honorary member of the International Buster Keaton Society and The Sons of the Desert, a Laurel and Hardy appreciation society.

== Death ==
In October 1998, Keaton was hospitalized at the Motion Picture Relief Fund Hospital in Woodland Hills suffering from emphysema and lung cancer. She died on October 19, 1998, aged 80. Her remains were cremated.

== Filmography ==
Film
Year	Film	Role	Notes
1938	The Big Broadcast of 1938	Chorus Girl	Uncredited
1939	The Wizard of Oz	Ozmite	Uncredited
1944	Bathing Beauty	Swimmer	Uncredited
1950	The Misadventures of Buster Keaton		Uncredited
1965	Buster Keaton Rides Again	Self	
2018	The Great Buster	Self (as Eleanor Norris)	Archive footage, posthumously release
Television
Year	Title	Role	Notes
1952	All Star Revue	Self	episode: Host: Walter O'Keefe; Guests: Frankie Laine, Buster Keaton, Eleanor Keaton, The Three Stooges, Margaret Whiting, Dorothy Shay, Johnny Carson
1957	This Is Your Life	Self	episode: Buster Keaton
1966	The Mike Douglas Show	Self	episode: #6.61
1971	The Merv Griffin Show	Self	episode: Roehauer Film Festival
1987	Buster Keaton: A Hard Act to Follow	Self	episode: #1.1, #1.2, #1.3
1998	E! Mysteries & Scandals	Self	episode: Fatty Arbuckle
1998	Biography	Self	Archive footage, episode: Fatty Arbuckle: Betrayed by Hollywood

== Portrayals ==
Eleanor Keaton's relationship with Buster Keaton is the subject of the 2022 semi-fictionalized novel Third Act by Kevin Mori, in which the two narrate alternating chapters.

== Sources ==
- Blesh, Rudi (1967). Keaton. Secker & Warburg – via Internet Archive.
- Grant, Edmond (1999). The Motion Picture Guide: 1999 Annual. CineBooks. ISBN 9780933997431.
- Keaton, Buster; Samuels, Charles (1960). My Wonderful World of Slapstick. Doubleday.
- Keaton, Eleanor; Vance, Jeffrey (2001). Buster Keaton Remembered. Harry N. Abrams Inc. ISBN 9780810942271.
- Meade, Marion (2014). Buster Keaton: Cut to the Chase. Open Road Media. ISBN 9781497602311.
- Tibbetts, John C. (September 1, 1995). "The Hole in the Doughnut: The Last Days of Buster Keaton". Journal of Dramatic Theory and Criticism. X (1).
- Wilson, Scott (2016). Resting Places: The Burial Sites of More Than 14,000 Famous Persons (3rd ed.). McFarland. ISBN 9780786479924.
