= Seeing Stars =

Seeing Stars may refer to

- Seeing Stars (1922 film), a one-reel "trailer" film with appearances by Charlie Chaplin and Buster Keaton
- Seeing Stars (1932 film), a Krazy Kat animated short
- Seeing Stars (TV series), a 1950s Australian variety TV show
- Seeing Stars (band/album), British band of the 1990s with an eponymous album
- Seeing Stars, a 2010 poetry collection by Simon Armitage
- "Seeing Stars", the second episode of the second season of Helluva Boss
- For seeing stars, the visual illusion often used as a device in cartoons, see phosphene
