= Buster Keaton =

American actor and filmmaker (1895–1966)

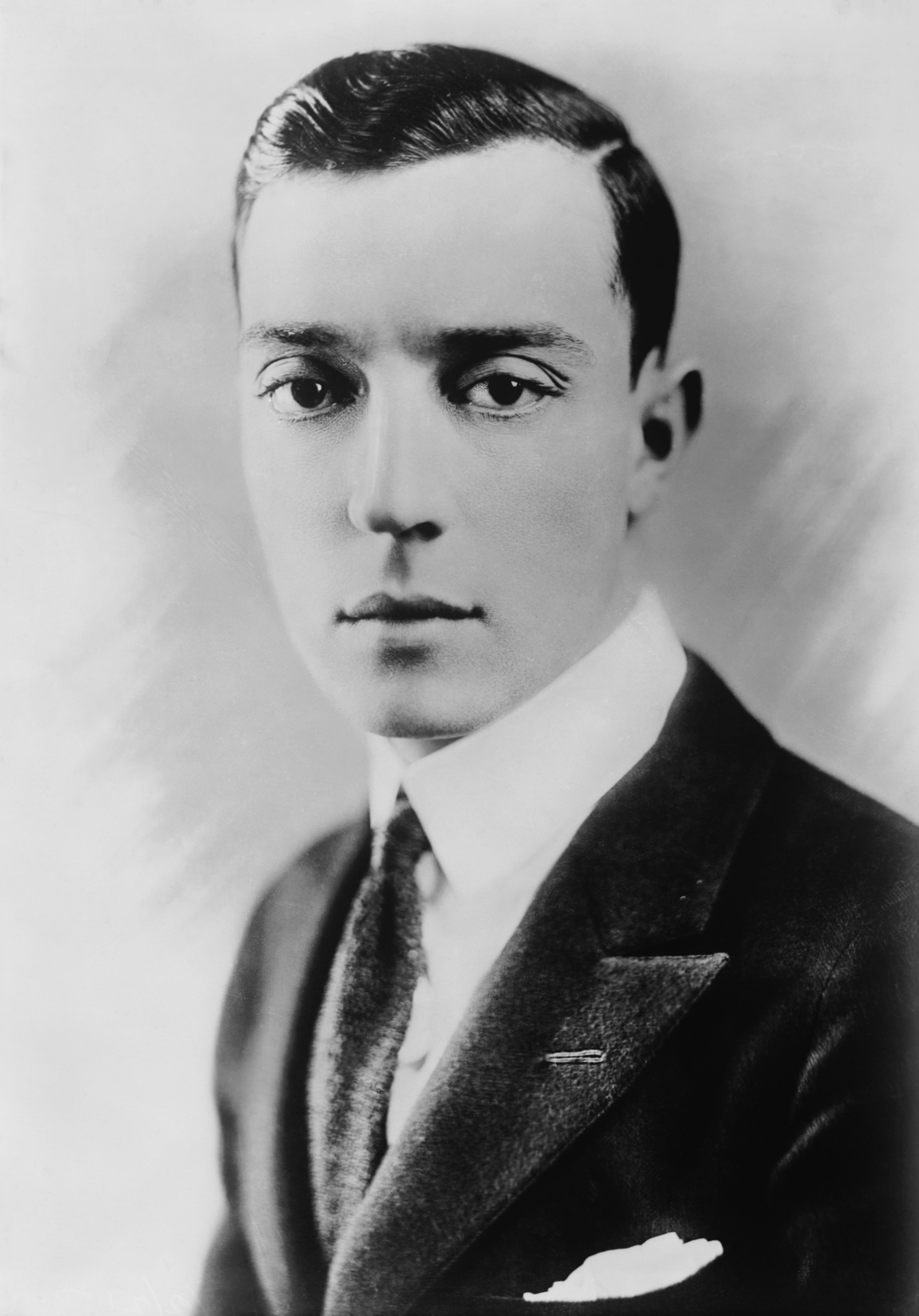
- Keaton c. 1920s
- Born: Joseph Frank Keaton; October 4, 1895; Piqua, Kansas, U.S.
- Died: February 1, 1966 (aged 70); Los Angeles, California, U.S.
- Resting place: Forest Lawn Memorial Park
- Occupations: Actor; comedian; filmmaker; stuntman
- Years active: 1899–1966
- Works: Full list
- Spouses: Natalie Talmadge (m. 1921; div. 1932) Mae Scriven (m. 1933; div. 1936) Eleanor Norris (m. 1940)
- Children: 2
- Parents: Joe Keaton (father); Myra Cutler (mother)
- Awards: Honorary Oscar (1959)

Joseph Frank "Buster" Keaton (October 4, 1895 – February 1, 1966) was an American actor, comedian and filmmaker. He is best known for his silent films, in which he performed physical comedy and inventive stunts. He maintained a stoic, deadpan facial expression that became his trademark and earned him the nickname "The Great Stone Face".

Keaton was a child vaudeville star, performing as part of his family's traveling act. As an adult, he began working with independent producer Joseph M. Schenck and filmmaker Edward F. Cline, with whom he made successful two-reel comedies in the early 1920s, including One Week (1920), The Playhouse (1921) and The Electric House (1922). He moved to feature-length films, including Our Hospitality (1923), Sherlock Jr. (1924), The General (1926) and Steamboat Bill, Jr. (1928). Orson Welles called The General "the greatest comedy ever made...and perhaps the greatest film ever made".

Keaton's career declined after 1928, when he signed with Metro-Goldwyn-Mayer and lost his artistic independence. His first wife divorced him, and he descended into alcoholism. He was fired from MGM in 1933, ending his career as a leading man in feature films. He recovered in the 1940s, marrying Eleanor Norris and working as an honored comic performer until the end of his life. During this period, he made cameos in Billy Wilder's Sunset Boulevard (1950) and Charlie Chaplin's Limelight (1952).

Roger Ebert wrote of Keaton's "extraordinary period from 1920 to 1929" making him "the greatest actor-director in the history of the movies". In 1996, Entertainment Weekly recognized Keaton as the seventh-greatest film director, writing "his films offer belly laughs of mind-boggling physical invention and a spacey determination that nears philosophical grandeur." The American Film Institute included The General, Sherlock Jr. and The Navigator on their AFI's 100 Years...100 Laughs list. He is the subject of Kevin Brownlow's Buster Keaton: A Hard Act to Follow (1987) and Peter Bogdanovich's The Great Buster: A Celebration (2018).

== Career ==
=== Early life in vaudeville ===
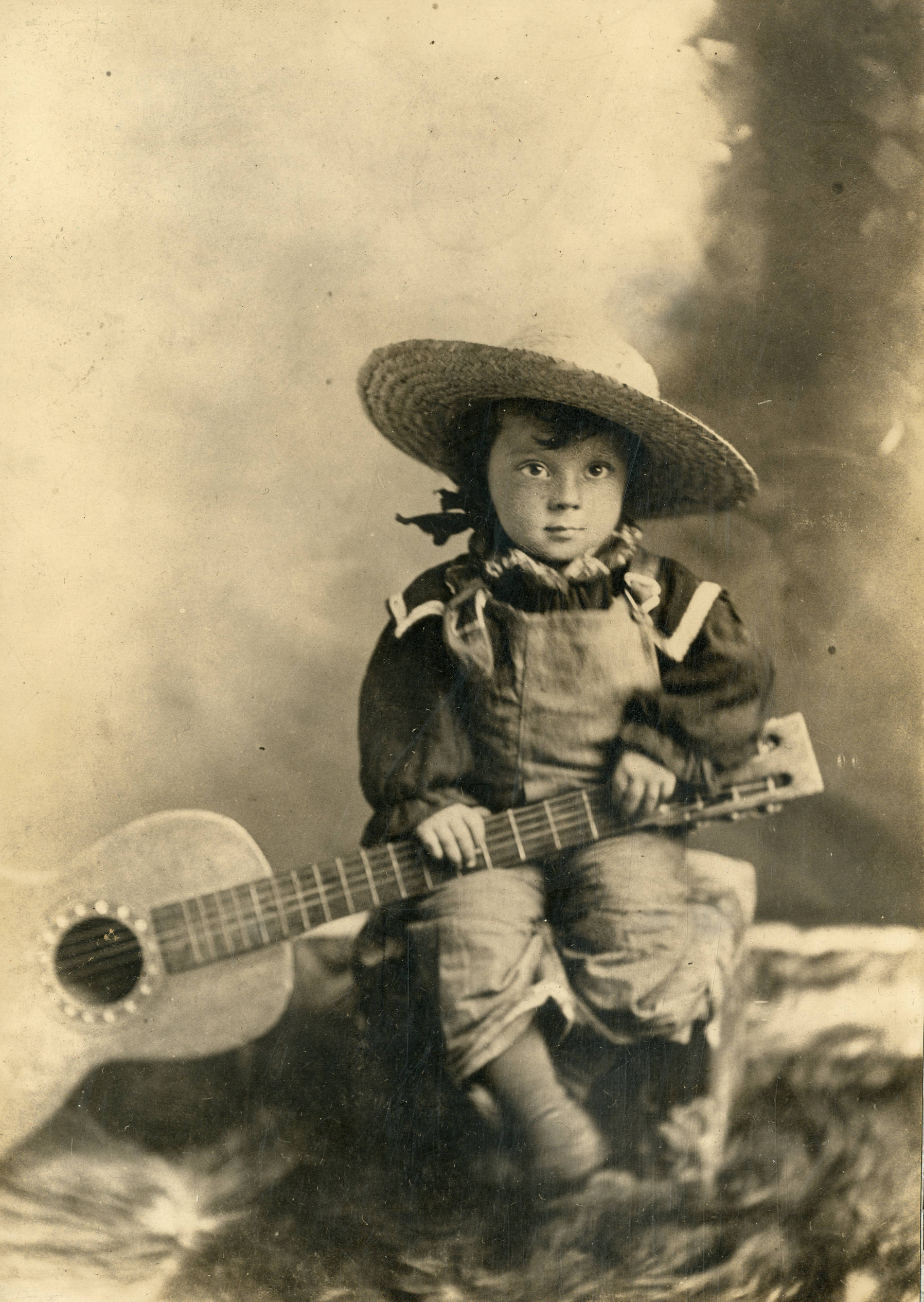
Keaton as a child in vaudeville (c. 1897)

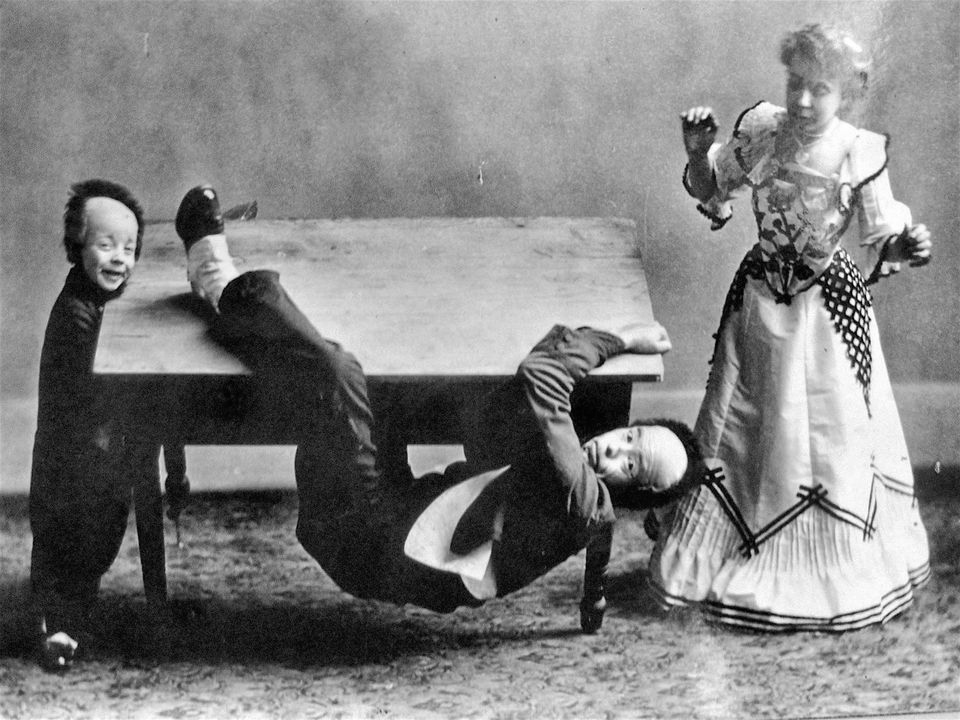
Six-year-old Keaton and his parents Myra and Joe Keaton, in a publicity photo for their vaudeville act, The Three Keatons

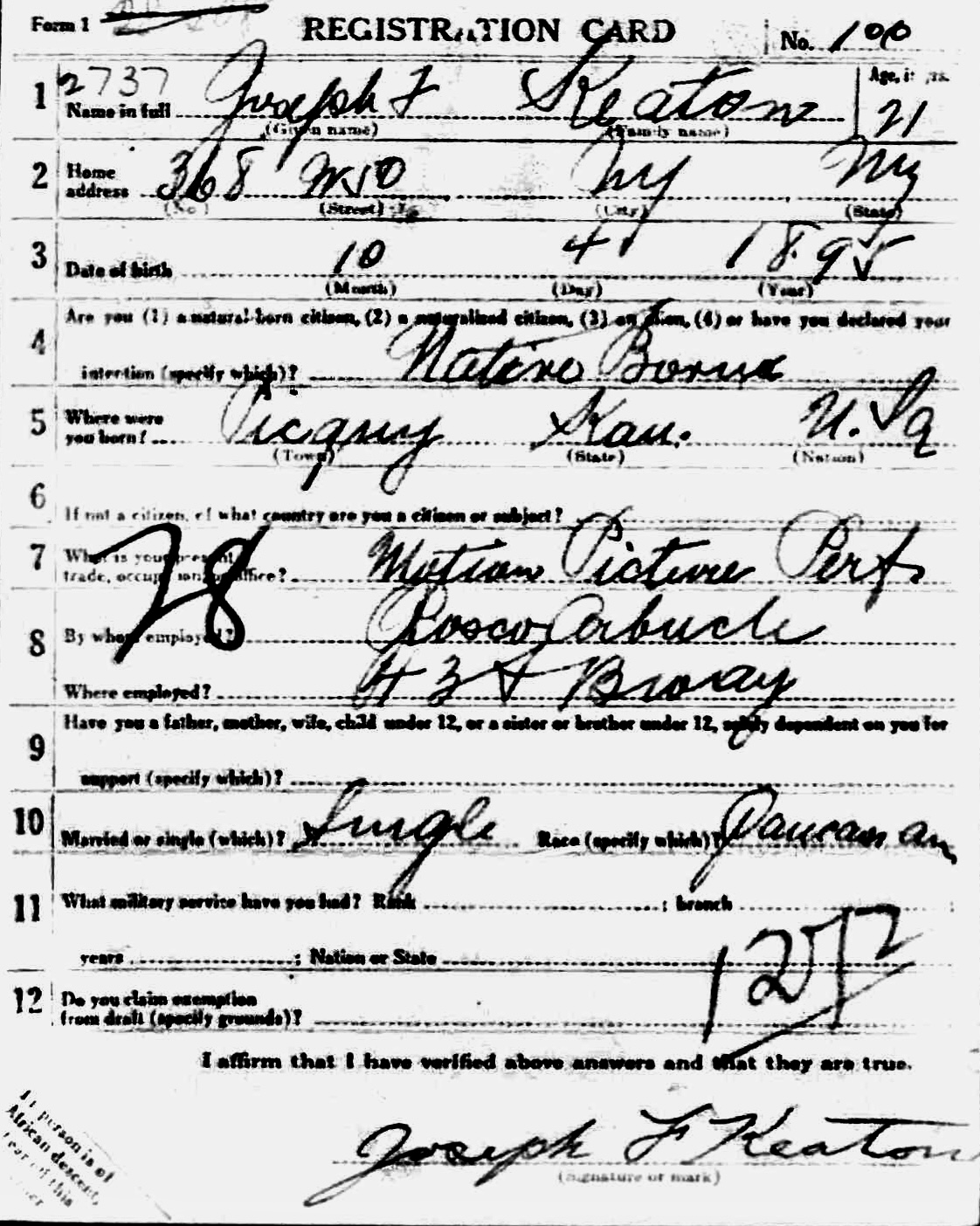
Buster Keaton's draft card; "motion picture performer" employed by Roscoe Arbuckle

Keaton was born on October 4, 1895, to a vaudeville family in Piqua, Kansas, the small town that his mother, Myra Keaton (née Cutler), was visiting at the time. He was named Joseph to continue a tradition on his father's side (he was sixth in a line bearing the name Joseph Keaton) and Frank for his maternal grandfather, who disapproved of his parents' union. His father was Joseph Hallie "Joe" Keaton who had a traveling show called the Mohawk Indian Medicine Company, which performed on stage and sold patent medicine on the side. According to a frequently repeated story, which may be apocryphal, Keaton acquired the nickname Buster at the age of 18 months. After the child fell down a long flight of stairs without injury, an actor friend named George Pardey remarked, "Gee whiz, he's a regular buster!" After this, Keaton's father began to use the nickname to refer to the youngster. Keaton retold the anecdote over the years, including in a 1964 interview with the CBC's Telescope. In Keaton's retelling, he was six months old when the incident occurred, and Harry Houdini gave him the nickname (though the family did not get to know Houdini until later). Family lore tells of a cyclone picking a young Buster up and depositing him four blocks away, an image that worked its way into one of his films.

At the age of 3, Keaton began performing with his parents in The Three Keatons. He first appeared on stage in 1899 in Wilmington, Delaware. The act was mainly a comedy sketch. Myra played the saxophone to one side, while Joe and Buster performed center stage, both wearing slapsoles, bald-headed wigs and "Irish" beards. The young Keaton goaded his father by disobeying him, and the elder Keaton responded by throwing him against the scenery, into the orchestra pit, or even into the audience. A suitcase handle was sewn into Keaton's clothing to aid with the constant tossing. The act evolved as Keaton learned to take trick falls safely; he was rarely injured or bruised on stage. This knockabout style of comedy led to accusations of child abuse and, occasionally, arrest. However, Keaton was always able to show the authorities that he had no bruises or broken bones. He was eventually billed as "The Little Boy Who Can't Be Damaged", and the overall act as "The Roughest Act That Was Ever in the History of the Stage". Decades later, Keaton said that he was never hurt by his father and that the falls and physical comedy were a matter of proper technical execution. In 1914, he told the Detroit News: "The secret is in landing limp and breaking the fall with a foot or a hand. It's a knack. I started so young that landing right is second nature with me. Several times I'd have been killed if I hadn't been able to land like a cat. Imitators of our act don't last long, because they can't stand the treatment."

Keaton said he had so much fun that he sometimes began laughing as his father threw him across the stage. Noticing that this caused the audience to laugh less, he adopted his famous deadpan expression when performing. The act ran up against laws banning child performers in vaudeville. According to one biographer, Keaton was made to go to school while performing in New York, but only attended for part of one day. Despite tangles with the law, Keaton was a rising and relatively well-paid star in the theater. He stated that he learned to read and write late, and was taught by his mother. By the time he was 21, his father's alcoholism threatened the reputation of the family act, so Buster and Myra left for New York, where his career quickly moved from vaudeville to film.

Keaton served in the American Expeditionary Forces in France with the United States Army's 40th Infantry Division during World War I. His unit remained intact and was not broken up to provide replacements, as happened to some other late-arriving divisions. During his time in the army he developed an ear infection that permanently impaired his hearing.

=== Film ===
==== Silent era ====
Keaton spent the summers of 1908–1916 "at the 'Actor's Colony' in the Bluffton neighborhood of Muskegon, Michigan, along with other famous vaudevillians."

In February 1917, he met Roscoe "Fatty" Arbuckle at the Talmadge Studios in New York City, where Arbuckle was under contract to Joseph M. Schenck. Joe Keaton disapproved of films, and Keaton also had reservations about the medium. During his first meeting with Arbuckle, he was asked to jump in and start acting. Keaton was such a natural in his first film, The Butcher Boy, he was hired on the spot. At the end of the day, he asked to borrow one of the cameras to get a feel for how it worked. He took the camera back to his hotel room where he dismantled and reassembled it by morning. Keaton later said that he was soon Arbuckle's second director and his entire gag department. He appeared in a total of 14 Arbuckle shorts, running into 1920. They were popular, and contrary to Keaton's later reputation as "The Great Stone Face", he often smiled and even laughed in them. Keaton and Arbuckle became close friends, and Keaton was one of the few people, along with Charlie Chaplin, to defend Arbuckle's character during accusations that he was responsible for the death of actress Virginia Rappe. (Arbuckle was eventually acquitted, with an apology from the jury for the ordeal he underwent.)

In 1920, The Saphead was released, in which Keaton had his first starring role in a full-length feature film. It was based on a successful play, The New Henrietta, which had already been filmed once, under the title The Lamb, with Douglas Fairbanks playing the lead. After Keaton's successful work with Arbuckle, Schenck gave him his own production unit, Buster Keaton Productions. He made a series of 19 two-reel comedies, including One Week (1920), The Playhouse (1921), Cops and The Electric House (both 1922). Keaton then moved to full-length features.

Keaton, who did his own stunt work, in a potentially life-threatening scene from Steamboat Bill, Jr. (1928)

Keaton's writers included Clyde Bruckman, Joseph Mitchell and Jean Havez, but the most ingenious gags were generally conceived by Keaton himself. Director Leo McCarey, recalling the freewheeling days of making slapstick comedies, said, "All of us tried to steal each other's gagmen. But we had no luck with Keaton because he thought up his best gags himself and we couldn't steal him!" The more adventurous ideas called for dangerous stunts, performed by Keaton at great physical risk. A scene from Steamboat Bill, Jr. required Keaton to stand still as the facade of a two-story building fell on top of him. Keaton's character emerged unscathed, due to a single open window. The stunt required precision, because the prop facade weighed two tons, and the window only offered a few inches of clearance around Keaton's body. The sequence furnished one of the most memorable images of his career. He insisted on doing his own stunts, as "stuntmen don't get laughs".

Aside from Steamboat Bill, Jr. (1928), Keaton's most enduring feature-length films include Three Ages and Our Hospitality (both 1923), The Navigator and Sherlock Jr. (both 1924), Seven Chances (1925), The General (1926) and The Cameraman (1928). The General, set during the American Civil War, combined physical comedy with Keaton's love of trains, including an epic locomotive chase. Employing picturesque locations, the film's storyline reenacted an actual wartime incident. Though it would come to be regarded as Keaton's greatest achievement, the film received mixed reviews at the time. It was too dramatic for some filmgoers expecting a lightweight comedy, and reviewers questioned Keaton's judgment in making a comedic film about the Civil War, even while noting it had a "few laughs".

It was an expensive misfire (the climactic scene of a locomotive plummeting through a burning bridge was the most expensive single shot in silent-film history), and Keaton was never entrusted with total control over his films again. His distributor, United Artists, insisted on a production manager who monitored expenses and interfered with certain story elements. Keaton endured this treatment for two more feature films, and then exchanged his independent setup for employment at Hollywood's biggest studio, Metro-Goldwyn-Mayer (MGM). Keaton's loss of independence as a filmmaker coincided with the coming of sound films (although he was interested in making the transition) and mounting personal problems, and his career in the early sound era was hurt as a result.

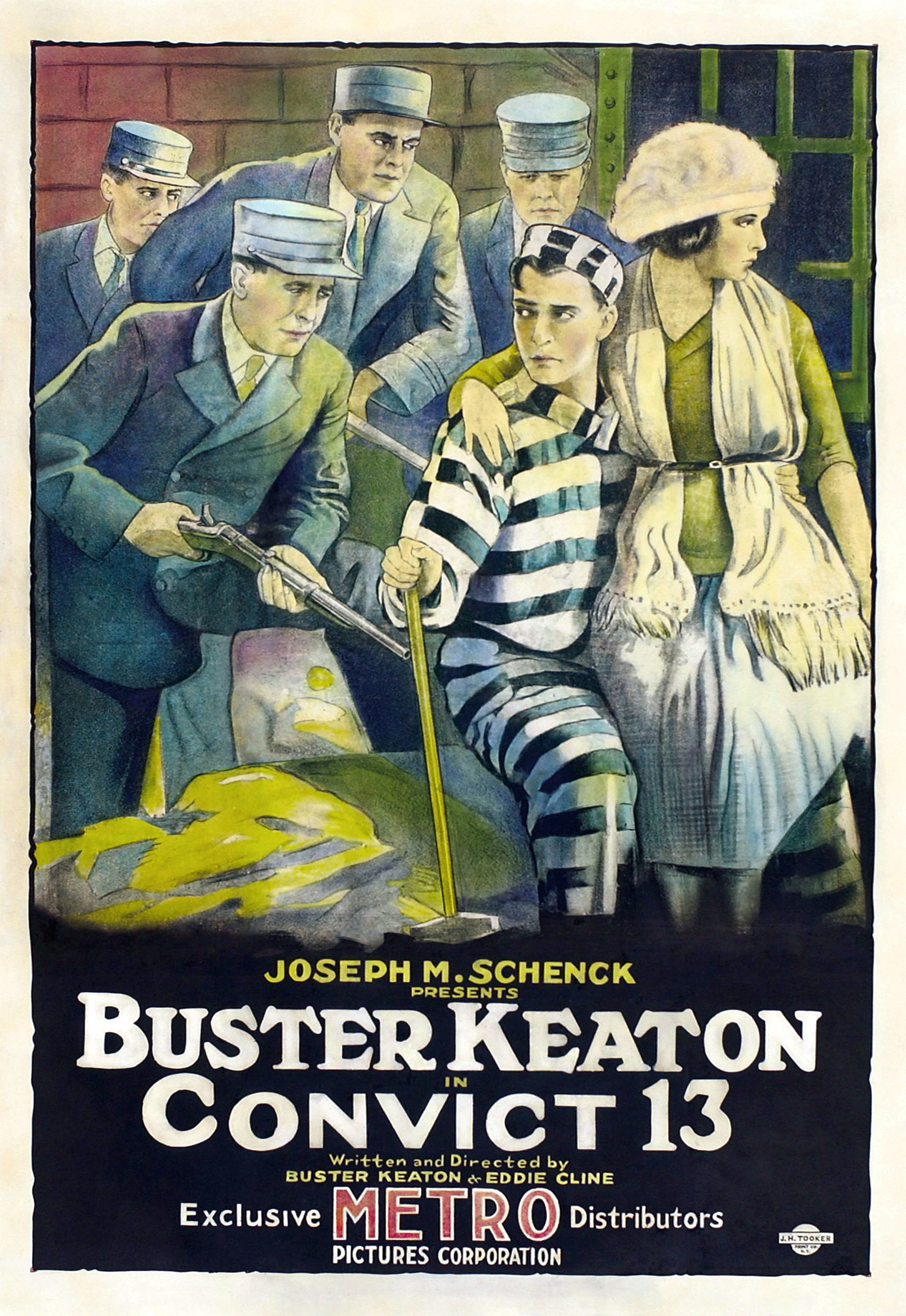
Theater poster for Convict 13 (1920)

A short clip from the beginning of Cops (1922).

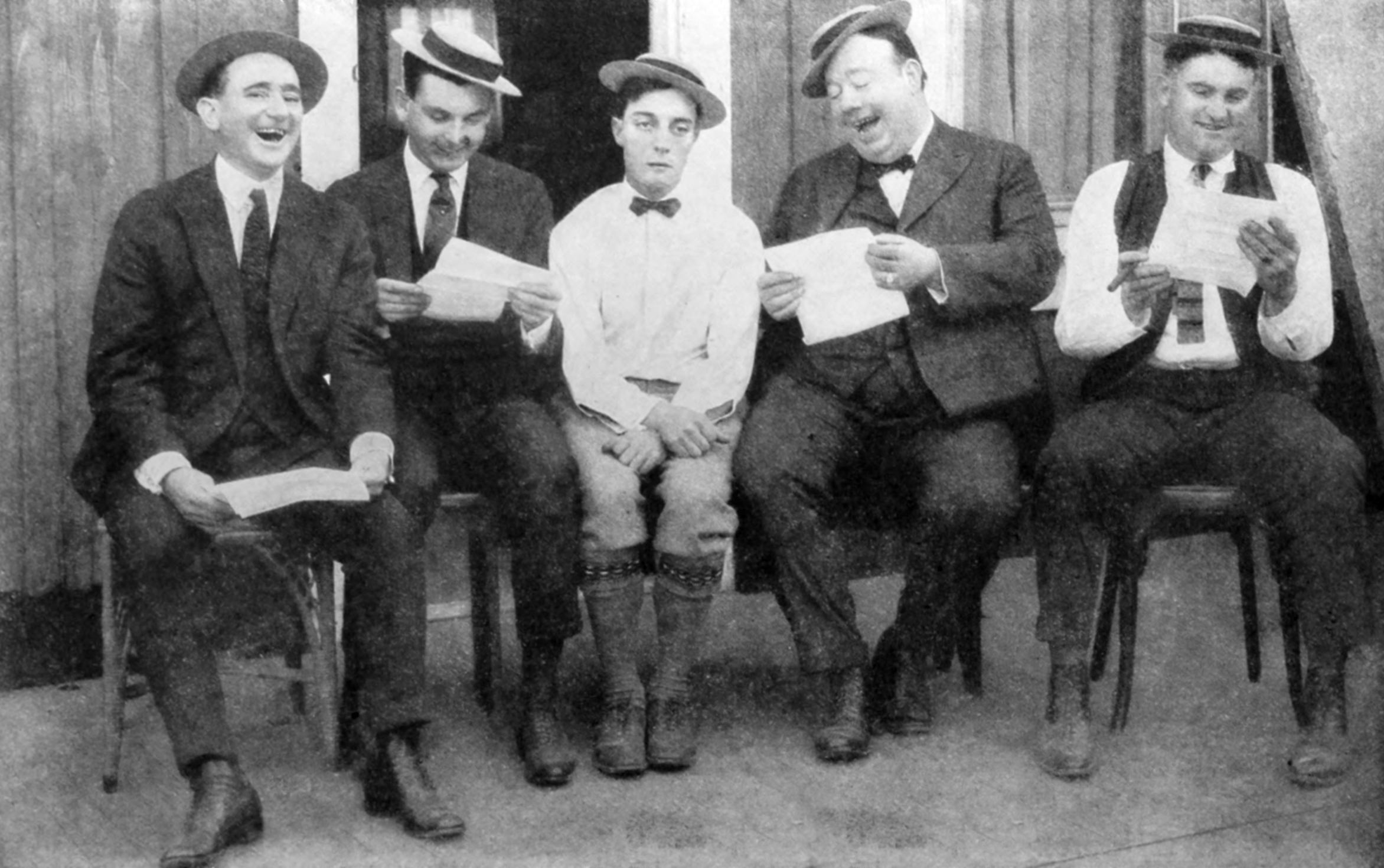
Keaton (center) in 1923 with (from left) writers Joe Mitchell, Clyde Bruckman, Jean Havez and Eddie Cline

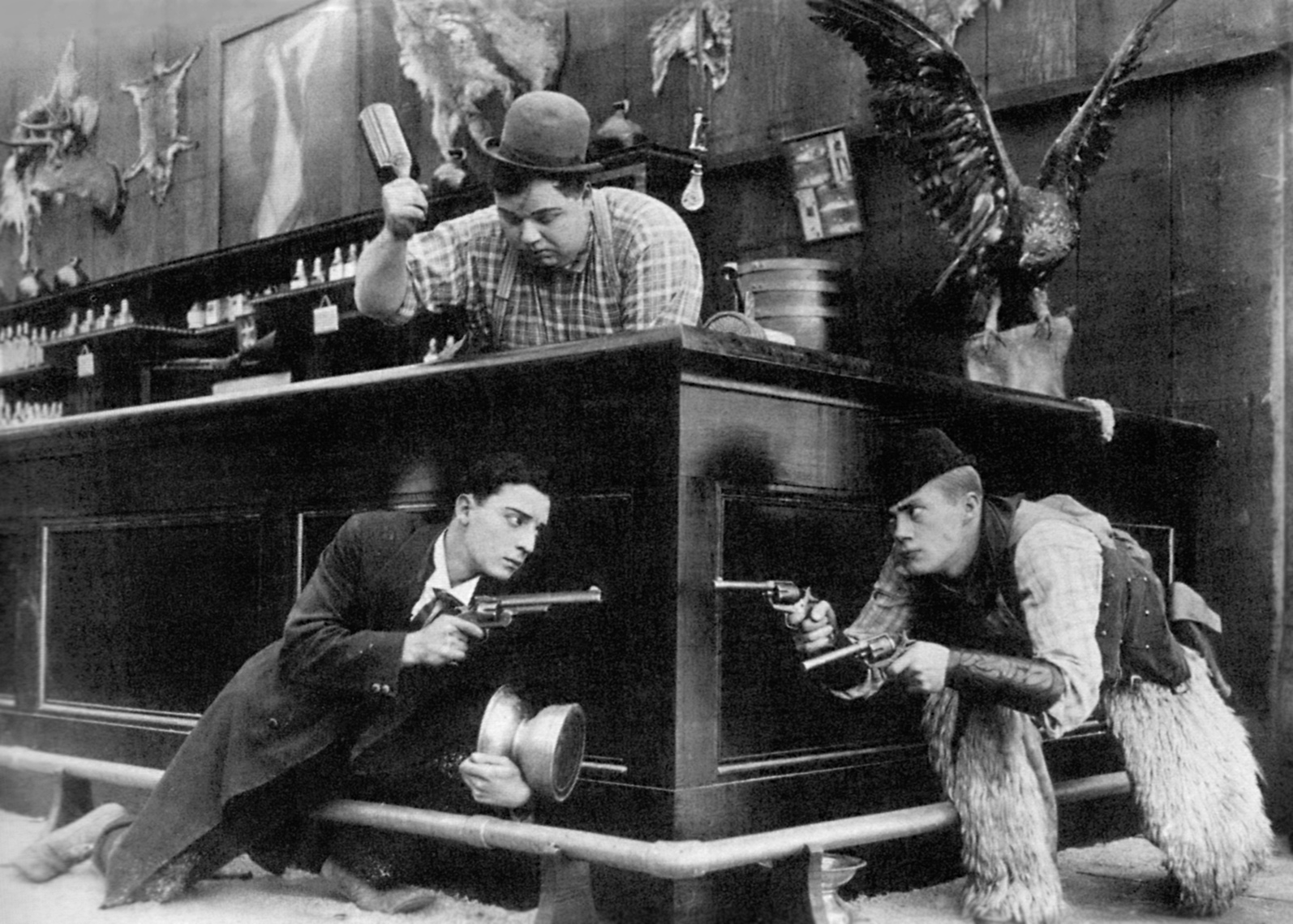
Keaton (left) with Roscoe Arbuckle (top) and Al St. John in a still from Out West (1918)

=== New studio, new problems ===
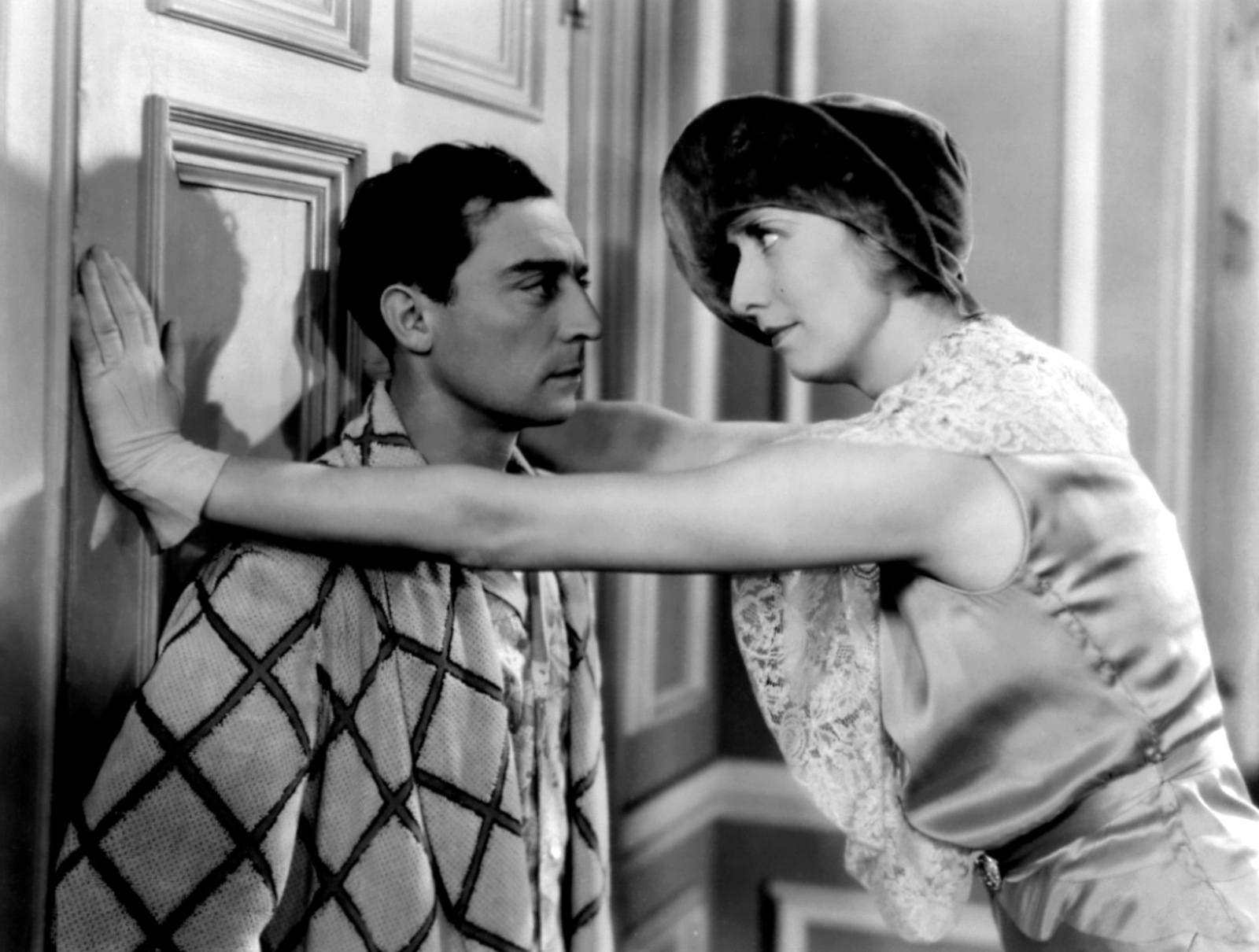
With Charlotte Greenwood in one of his first "talkies", Parlor, Bedroom and Bath (1931)

Keaton's last three features, which had been produced under Keaton's control and released independently, fell short of financial expectations at the box office. In 1928 film executive Nicholas Schenck arranged a deal with Metro-Goldwyn-Mayer for Keaton's services. Keaton had little to say about the details of the MGM contract; he would no longer have any financial responsibility for his films, and even his salary had been pre-negotiated, without his own input. Charlie Chaplin and Harold Lloyd advised him against making the move, cautioning that he would lose his independence. But, given Schenck's desire to keep things "in the family" and Keaton's having to admit that his independent pictures hadn't done well, Keaton agreed to sign with MGM. In his autobiography, he cited this as the worst business decision of his life.

Welcomed to the studio by Irving Thalberg, with whom he initially had a relationship of mutual admiration, Keaton realized too late that the studio system MGM represented would severely limit his creative input. The giant studio was run along strict factory lines, with everything planned and budgeted in advance. The first of MGM's Keaton films was The Cameraman (1928), and Keaton sensed trouble immediately when he saw the script: "It was as long as War and Peace. I took out 40 useless characters and a couple of subplots. These guys didn't realize—they still don't realize—that the best comedies are simple. I said, 'I'd like to do something with a drunk and a fat lady and a kid. Get 'em for me.' At my studio they would have the characters I wanted in 10 minutes. But not MGM. You had to requisition a toothpick in triplicate. I just stood there, and everybody is hassling." MGM wanted only Keaton the star, Keaton the creator was considered a waste of time and money because "in the time it took him to develop a project, he could have appeared in two or three pictures set up by the studio's production staff."

When the studio began making talking films, Keaton was enthused about the new technology and wanted to make his next film, Spite Marriage, with sound. MGM refused, because the film was more valuable in silent form; it could be shown around the world in theaters that had not converted to sound. Also, soundstages were then at a premium, and MGM usually reserved them for dramatic productions. MGM also forced Keaton to use a stunt double during some of the more dangerous scenes to protect its investment, something he had never done in his heyday: "Stuntmen don't get you laughs," Keaton had said.

In the first Keaton pictures with sound, he and his fellow actors would shoot each scene three times: once in English, once in Spanish, and once in either French or German. The actors would phonetically memorize the foreign-language scripts a few lines at a time and shoot immediately after. This is discussed in the TCM documentary Buster Keaton: So Funny it Hurt, with Keaton complaining about having to shoot lousy films not just once, but three times.

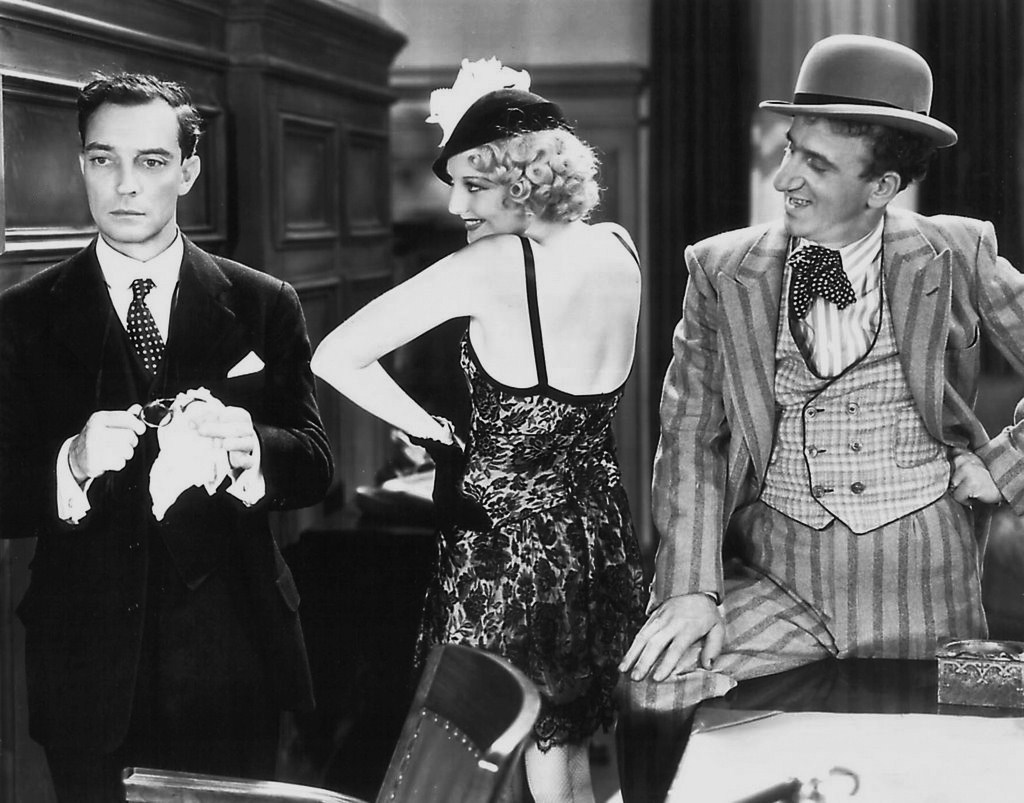
Keaton, Thelma Todd and Jimmy Durante in Speak Easily (1932)

Keaton kept trying to persuade his bosses to let him do things his way. Production head Irving Thalberg would not permit Keaton to create a script from scratch because the studio had already purchased a stage property dating from 1917, Parlor, Bedroom and Bath, at the suggestion of Lawrence Weingarten, who was Thalberg's brother-in-law and Keaton's producer. ("We were desperate. We didn't know what to do," recalled Weingarten.) However, Thalberg did allow Keaton to stage the gags, including long stretches of pantomime, and agreed to send a crew to Keaton's own mansion for exterior shots. Keaton's relative freedom during this project resulted in a better than usual film. "Apart from its exceptional quality," writes biographer James Curtis, "the big takeaway from Parlor, Bedroom and Bath was its extraordinary commercial success. Performing better at the box office than any of Keaton's other MGM talkies, it pulled in worldwide rentals of $985,000 [$20,694,850 in 2024]. With a yield [net profit] of $299,000 [$6,281,990 in 2024], it became the most profitable of all of Buster Keaton's features, silent or sound." Curtis notes that it was also the only one of his MGM features that came in under budget and ahead of schedule.

The next project confirmed Keaton's fears about studio interference. He was handed a script titled Sidewalks of New York (1931), in which he played a millionaire becoming involved with a slum-neighborhood girl and a gang of rowdy kids. Keaton thought the premise was totally unsuitable, and was uncomfortable with his directors Jules White and Zion Myers, who emphasized blunt slapstick. "I went over (Weingarten's) head and appealed to Irving Thalberg to help get me out of the assignment. Irving was usually on my side, but this time he said, 'Larry likes it. Everybody else in the studio likes the story. You are the only one who doesn't.' In the end, I gave up like a fool and said 'what the hell?' Who was I to say I was right and everyone was wrong?" The film's emphasis on obvious slapstick made it unsuitable for the usual, prestigious Broadway premiere—it opened simultaneously in two New York side-street theaters—but the less discriminating audiences in small towns across America flocked to the film, resulting in an ultimate success.

MGM had been featuring comical musician Cliff Edwards in Keaton's films. The studio replaced Edwards with Jimmy Durante. The laconic Keaton and the rambunctious Durante offered enough contrast to function as a team, resulting in three very successful films: Speak Easily (1932), The Passionate Plumber (1932) and What! No Beer? (1933).

=== Trouble behind the scenes ===
In March 1932 studio chief Louis B. Mayer's office requested Keaton to report for work on a Saturday afternoon, to go through the motions of filming a scene for studio visitors. Keaton already had plans to attend a local college-baseball championship, where he was to be the home-team mascot. He sent his regrets to Mayer's office and kept his date at the ball game, only to receive a warning from Mayer the following Tuesday, suspending his pay until he resumed working.

Keaton's behavior had become erratic by 1932. He was despondent over working conditions at the studio and his troubled marriage at home. This affected his films; he was sometimes visibly intoxicated on- and off-camera. "I got to the stage where I didn't give a darn whether school kept or not, and then I started drinking too much," Keaton told interviewer Tony Thomas. "When I found out that they could write stories and material better than I could anyway, what was the use of my fighting with them?" The demoralized Keaton couldn't turn to production chief Irving Thalberg for support, because Thalberg was then on a medical leave that lasted eight months. This left Louis B. Mayer temporarily in sole charge of the studio, which made Keaton's standing at MGM even more fragile. Keaton's absences were costing the company $3,000 a day ($70,000 a day in 2025).

The last straw came when Mayer "raided" Keaton's dressing room during a wild party with Keaton's "cronies and their girlfriends". MGM staffer Sam Marx remembered the outcome: "Buster ordered him out of the trailer, and Mayer ordered him out of the studio." Mayer couldn't oust him immediately, because Keaton's latest picture wasn't yet finished. Immediately after Keaton completed retakes on What! No Beer?, he was fired "for good and sufficient cause" in a letter signed by Mayer on February 2, 1933.

Keaton had been considered to appear in the studio's all-star success Grand Hotel, only to have his role of the consumptive Kringelein taken by Lionel Barrymore. As What! No Beer? was nearing completion, Keaton—"sober, shaved, and calm" as Keaton told his biographer Rudi Blesh—pitched an idea to Irving Thalberg. He wanted to make a feature-length parody of Grand Hotel with an all-comedy cast: himself in the Lionel Barrymore role, Jimmy Durante in the John Barrymore role, Marie Dressler in the Greta Garbo role, Polly Moran in the Joan Crawford role, Henry Armetta in the Jean Hersholt role, Edward Everett Horton in the Lewis Stone role, and Laurel and Hardy sharing the Wallace Beery role. Edward Sedgwick would be directing. Keaton called his version Grand Mills Hotel (after the Mills Hotel, a Bowery flophouse). Thalberg was hesitant about burlesquing the dignified studio's own work but, seeing Keaton's obvious disappointment, said he'd think about it.

After Louis B. Mayer had fired Keaton, Thalberg returned to the studio and persuaded Mayer that Keaton was still valuable to the company. Thalberg tried to resurrect Keaton's MGM career by offering to go ahead with the Grand Hotel satire, now retitled Gland Hotel. Keaton, still furious at Mayer, refused to return to the studio and Mayer was not about to apologize. So ended Buster Keaton's starring career in feature films.

=== European productions ===
In 1934, Keaton accepted an offer to make an independent film in Paris, Le Roi des Champs-Élysées; it was not released in the United States. During this period, he made another film in England, The Invader. MGM needed a certain number of British-made films to comply with Britain's Cinematograph Films Act of 1927: if American studios wanted to release their films in Britain, they would have to accept and distribute a certain quota of British films. MGM distributed the Keaton film in England to satisfy the quota, but declined to release it in the United States, because the studio had already terminated Keaton's employment and was no longer promoting him as one of its stars. The Invader was acquired by American film importer J. H. Hoffberg in October 1935, and he retitled it An Old Spanish Custom. Hoffberg released the film in the United States on the "states-rights" market, where independent exchanges bought regional rights to the film and offered it to local theaters in their territories. Because Hoffberg charged much lower rates than MGM had for a Buster Keaton feature, many independent companies grabbed it. Beginning in December 1935, An Old Spanish Custom played on double-feature programs in major theaters.

=== Educational Pictures ===
In 1934, Buster Keaton made a screen comeback in two-reel comedies for Educational Pictures. Most of these 20-minute shorts are simple visual comedies, with many of the gags supplied by Keaton himself, often recycling ideas from his family vaudeville act and his earlier films. Keaton had a free hand in staging the films, within the studio's budgetary limits and using its staff writers. The Educational two-reelers have far more pantomime than his earlier talkies, and Keaton is in good form throughout. The high point in the Educational series is Grand Slam Opera (1936), featuring Keaton in his own screenplay as an amateur-hour contestant.

The Educational series was very well received by theater owners and movie audiences, and Keaton was the studio's most important comedian. He was also its most expensive comedian (earning $2,500 per film, equal to $59,774 in 2025), and when Educational was forced to economize in 1937, the company could no longer afford to maintain two studios. Educational closed its Hollywood studio, thus forfeiting Keaton's services, and kept its cheaper New York studio going. The company replaced Keaton with New York-based stage star Willie Howard.

=== Gag writer ===
After Keaton's Educational series lapsed, he returned to MGM as a gag writer, supplying material for the final three Marx Brothers MGM films: At the Circus (1939), Go West (1940) and The Big Store (1941); these were not as artistically successful as the Marxes' previous MGM features. Keaton also directed three one-reel novelty shorts for the studio, but these did not result in further directorial assignments.

=== Columbia Pictures ===
In 1939, Columbia Pictures hired Keaton to star in two-reel comedies; he filmed two at a time over two years. These 10 films comprise his last series as a starring comedian. Columbia's short-subject comedians were generally paid a flat fee of $500 per film. Keaton, considered exceptional, was hired at double the usual rate. The director was usually Jules White, whose emphasis on slapstick and farce made most of these films resemble White's famous Three Stooges shorts. White sometimes paired Keaton with a second banana: either veteran comic Monty Collins or raucous comic dancer Elsie Ames. The insistent White directed Keaton whenever possible – to Keaton's mild annoyance – and only two Keaton shorts did without White's services because they were filmed on location, away from the studio. Those remaining two shorts were directed by Del Lord, a former director for Mack Sennett. Keaton's personal favorite was the series' debut, Pest from the West, directed by Lord; it was a shorter, tighter remake of Keaton's little-viewed 1935 feature The Invader. Trade critics loved it. Film Daily raved: "One of the funniest shorts of the season. In fact, of any season. It just goes to prove that this Buster Keaton feller is a natural boxoffice gold mine that is not being mined. When a comedy shown cold in a projection room can make trade press critics howl in their seats, then you can bet your mortgaged theater that it's FUNNY [emphasis theirs]."

Moviegoers and exhibitors welcomed Keaton's Columbia comedies; and when Columbia began reissuing older comedies to theaters in 1948, Keaton's Pest from the West was chosen to launch the "Comedy Favorites" series ("A 1939 Buster Keaton film and one of his funniest," noted Boxoffice. "It is good to see Buster back.") Keaton's Columbia shorts came back to theaters from 1948 to 1952, and again from 1962 to 1964. Author John McElwee reports the boxoffice figures: "Pest from the West, the first series entry in 1939, brought back domestic rentals of $23,000, and subsequent ones tended to hover around that approximate figure (Nothing But Pleasure did $24,000, General Nuisance got $26,000). Columbia also realized profits from reissues of the Keatons after the war. The Spook Speaks was back for the 1949–50 season, and picked up $24,200, this in addition to the $28,500 it had realized on its initial run."

=== 1940s and feature films ===
Keaton's personal life had stabilized with his 1940 marriage to MGM dancer Eleanor Norris, and now he was taking life a little easier, abandoning Columbia for the less strenuous field of feature films. Resuming his daily job as an MGM gag writer, he provided material for Red Skelton and gave help and advice to Lucille Ball.

Keaton accepted various character roles in both "A" and "B" features. He made his last starring feature, El Moderno Barba Azul (1946), in Mexico; the film was a low-budget production, and it may not have been seen in the United States until its release on VHS videotape in 1986, under the title Boom in the Moon. The film has a largely negative reputation, with renowned film historian Kevin Brownlow calling it the worst film ever made.

Critics rediscovered Keaton in 1949 and producers occasionally hired him for bigger "prestige" pictures. He had cameos in such films as In the Good Old Summertime (1949), Sunset Boulevard (1950) and Around the World in 80 Days (1956). In In the Good Old Summertime, Keaton personally directed the stars Judy Garland and Van Johnson in their first scene together, where they bump into each other on the street. Keaton invented comedy bits where Johnson keeps trying to apologize to a seething Garland, but winds up messing up her hairdo and tearing her dress.

Keaton also appeared in a comedy routine about two inept stage musicians in Charlie Chaplin's Limelight (1952), recalling the vaudeville of The Playhouse. With the exception of Seeing Stars, a minor publicity film produced in 1922, Limelight was the only time in which the two would ever appear together on film.

=== Television and rediscovery ===
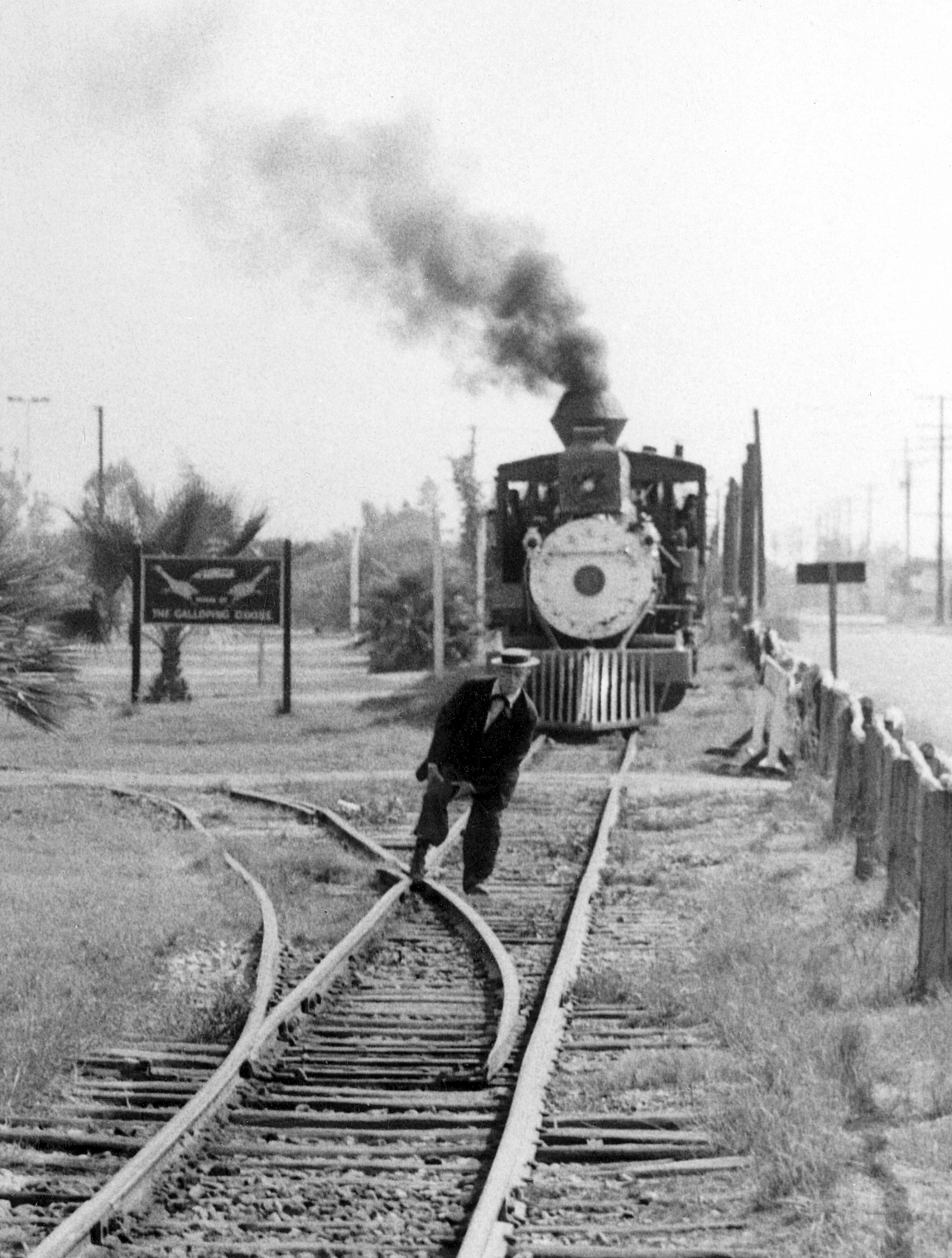
Keaton getting his foot stuck in railroad tracks at Knott's Berry Farm in 1956

In 1949, Ed Wynn invited Keaton to appear on his variety show, which was televised live on the West Coast. Kinescope film prints were made for distribution of the programs to other parts of the country, since there was no transcontinental coaxial cable until September 1951. Reaction was strong enough for a local Los Angeles station to offer Keaton The Buster Keaton Show (1950).

Producer Carl Hittleman mounted a new series, again titled The Buster Keaton Show, in 1951. This was an attempt to recreate the first series on film, allowing the program to be broadcast nationwide. The series benefited from a company of veteran actors, including Marcia Mae Jones as the ingenue, Iris Adrian, Dick Wessel, Fuzzy Knight, Dub Taylor, Philip Van Zandt, his silent-era contemporaries Harold Goodwin, Hank Mann and stuntman Harvey Parry. Keaton's wife Eleanor also was seen in the series (notably as Juliet to Keaton's Romeo in a little-theater vignette). Despite the hardworking cast and crew, the series was unsuccessful and only 13 half-hour episodes were filmed. Producer Hittleman audaciously reissued these same episodes in 1952 as though they were entirely new, with the series now titled Life with Buster Keaton. Variety reporter Fred Hift reviewed it as a series premiere, noting that it was filmed without a studio audience: the "lack of studio laughter weakened the climax of several of its acts." The producers fashioned a theatrical, hourlong feature film from the series, intended for the European market: The Misadventures of Buster Keaton was released on April 29, 1953, by British Lion, and it began playing on American television in September 1953. "Roughly reproduced slapstick museum piece, it's most likely to amuse those too young to remember the real thing," reported Josh Billings in London's Kinematograph Weekly. American television syndicators agreed, and marketed Life with Buster Keaton as a children's show. It continued to play for years afterward on small, low-budget stations.

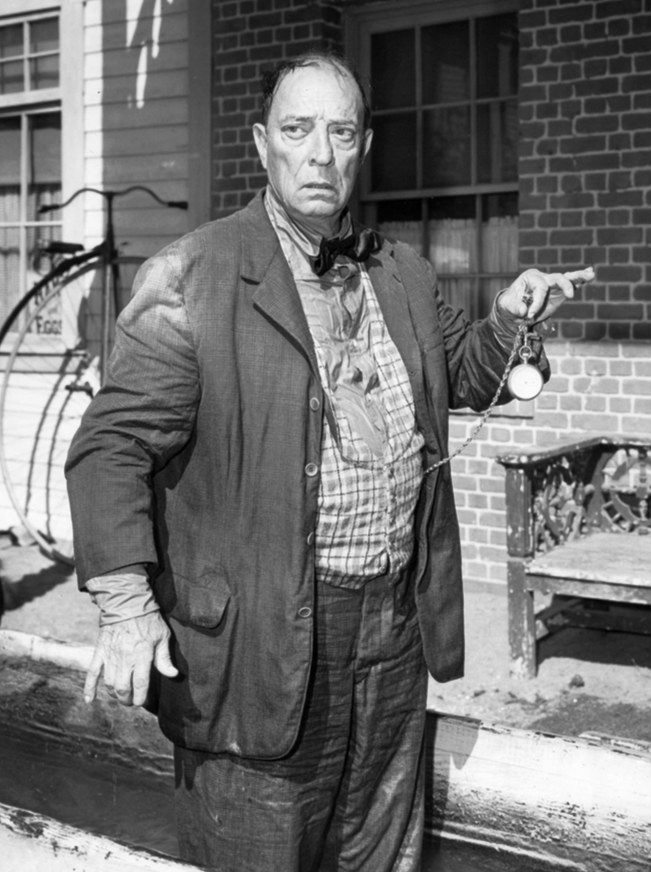
Keaton as a time traveler in the 1961 Twilight Zone episode "Once Upon a Time"

Keaton's periodic television appearances during the 1950s and 1960s helped to revive interest in his silent films. He appeared in the early television series Faye Emerson's Wonderful Town. Whenever a TV show wanted to simulate silent-movie comedy, Keaton answered the call and guested in such successful series as The Ken Murray Show, You Asked for It, The Garry Moore Show and The Ed Sullivan Show. Well into his fifties, Keaton successfully recreated his old routines, including one stunt in which he propped one foot onto a table, then swung the second foot up next to it and held the awkward position in midair for a moment before crashing to the stage floor. Garry Moore recalled, "I asked (Keaton) how he did all those falls, and he said, 'I'll show you.' He opened his jacket and he was all bruised. So that's how he did it—it hurt—but you had to care enough not to care."

=== Silent films revived ===
James Agee was key to reviving interest in Buster Keaton with his article about silent comedians in Life magazine in 1949, Comedy's Greatest Era. In 1954, Buster and Eleanor met movie-theater manager Raymond Rohauer, with whom they developed a business partnership to re-release his films. James Mason had bought the Keatons' house and found numerous cans of films, among which was Keaton's long-lost classic The Boat. Keaton had prints of the features Three Ages,Sherlock Jr., Steamboat Bill, Jr. and College (missing one reel), and the shorts The Boat and My Wife's Relations. Rohauer instructed Keaton to approach Mason for the films, but Mason—reasoning that Keaton didn't have the money to preserve the films himself—decided to donate them to the Academy of Motion Picture Arts and Sciences.

Rohauer then formed a new legal entity, Buster Keaton Productions, in September 1958. This gave Rohauer legal access to the old films at the academy. Rohauer had not reckoned on Leopold Friedman, sole surviving trustee of the original Buster Keaton Productions, Inc. of the 1920s. Friedman was now general counsel and secretary for Loew's Incorporated, MGM's parent company, and he represented MGM's interests and the stockholders of the still functioning Buster Keaton Productions, Inc. MGM still held the copyrights on six Keaton features and seven short subjects produced by Joe Schenck. Rohauer and Friedman waged legal battles for control of the Keaton films—in many cases Rohauer had the film prints but no rights, while Friedman had the rights but no film prints. The matter was finally settled in 1971, when Rohauer paid Friedman and the stockholders $50,000 for their percentage in the production company.

=== New fame in movies and television ===
On April 3, 1957, Buster Keaton was surprised by Ralph Edwards for the weekly NBC program This Is Your Life. The program also promoted the release of the fictionalized film biography The Buster Keaton Story with Donald O'Connor. In December 1958, Keaton was a guest star in the episode "A Very Merry Christmas" of The Donna Reed Show on ABC. He returned to the program in 1965 in the episode "Now You See It, Now You Don't". In August 1960, Keaton played mute King Sextimus the Silent in the national touring company of the Broadway musical Once Upon A Mattress. In 1961, he starred in The Twilight Zone episode "Once Upon a Time", which included both silent and sound sequences. He worked with comedian Ernie Kovacs on a television pilot tentatively titled Medicine Man, shooting scenes for it on January 12, 1962—the day before Kovacs died in a car crash. Medicine Man was completed but not aired.

=== Promotional and commercial films ===
Buster Keaton found steady work as an actor in TV commercials for Colgate, Alka-Seltzer, U.S. Steel, 7-Up, RCA Victor, Phillips 66, Milky Way, Ford Motors, Minit-Rub and Budweiser, among others. In a series of pantomime television commercials for Simon Pure Beer made in 1962 by Jim Mohr in Buffalo, New York, Keaton revisited some of the gags from his silent-film days.

In 1961, Keaton appeared in promotional films for Maryvale, a housing development in the western part of Phoenix.

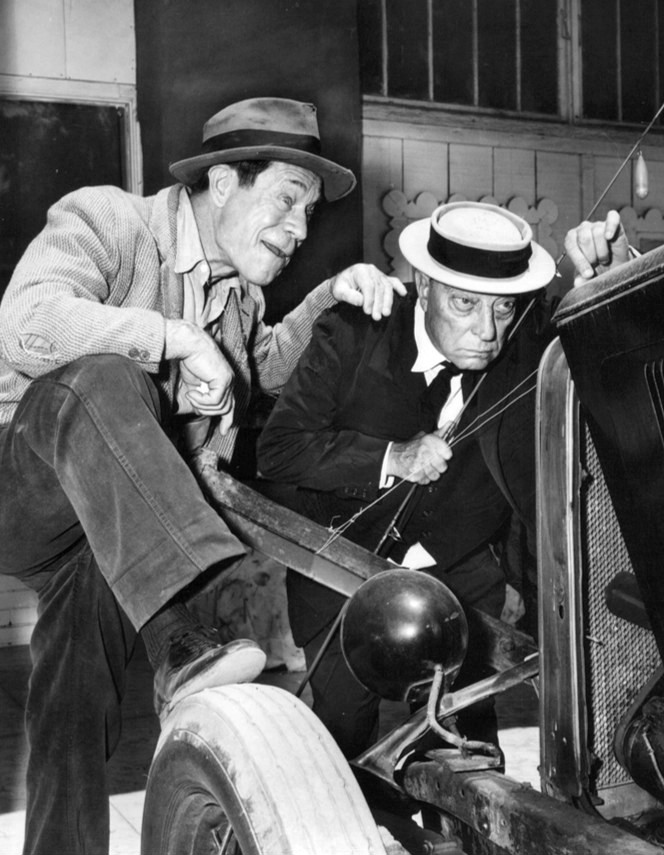
With Joe E. Brown in the 1962 Route 66 episode "Journey to Nineveh"

=== Return to feature films ===
In 1960, Keaton returned to MGM for the final time, playing a lion tamer in a 1960 adaptation of Mark Twain's Adventures of Huckleberry Finn. Much of the film was shot on location on the Sacramento River, which doubled for the Mississippi River setting of Twain's novel. In 1962 he signed on for a Canadian musical comedy feature, Ten Girls Ago, starring teen idol Dion and featuring Bert Lahr and Eddie Foy, Jr.. Keaton filmed his scenes as arranged, but the film endured a host of production problems and was never released.

Keaton had a cameo in the all-star comedy It's a Mad, Mad, Mad, Mad World (1963), appearing near the end as Jimmy. He assists Spencer Tracy's character, Captain C. G. Culpepper, by readying Culpepper's ultimately unused boat for his abortive escape. (The restored version of that film, released in 2013, contains a scene where Jimmy and Culpepper talk on the telephone. Lost after the comedy epic's "roadshow" exhibition, the audio of that scene was discovered and combined with still pictures to recreate the scene.)

In 1964, Keaton was featured in his first theatrical film series since 1941. American International Pictures hired him to furnish comedy scenes for its successful Beach Party pictures. Keaton appeared in four: Pajama Party (1964), Beach Blanket Bingo, How to Stuff a Wild Bikini and Sergeant Deadhead (all 1965). Director William Asher recalled:

I always loved Buster Keaton.... He would bring me bits and routines. He'd say, "How about this?" and it would just be this wonderful, inventive stuff.

Keaton's new popularity in movies prompted Columbia Pictures to re-release some of his vintage-1940 two-reel comedies to theaters. Columbia's home-movie division also sold two shorts, Pardon My Berth Marks and So You Won't Squawk, in abridged form on silent 8mm film.

During the autumn of 1964 Keaton was in Canada, starring in the color featurette The Railrodder for the National Film Board of Canada. He traveled from one end of Canada to the other on a motorized handcar, wearing his traditional pork pie hat and performing gags similar to those in films that he made 50 years before. A black-and-white companion film, Buster Keaton Rides Again (1965), documented Keaton at work during The Railrodder, staging, improving and rejecting gags on location.

In 1965, he appeared on the CBS television special A Salute to Stan Laurel, a tribute to the comedian and friend of Keaton who had died earlier that year. He also played the central role in Samuel Beckett's experimental project Film (1965).

American International co-produced an Italian comedy, War Italian Style (1965), co-starring the Italian comedy team of Franco and Ciccio. To make it more suitable for American audiences, the studio sent Buster Keaton, Fred Clark and Martha Hyer to join the cast and crew in Italy. (While in Italy, Keaton made an appearance at the Venice Film Festival.) Keaton's performance (as a German general) is almost entirely in pantomime.

For his next assignment, Keaton departed Italy for Spain, where Richard Lester's A Funny Thing Happened on the Way to the Forum was filmed in September–November 1965. Keaton amazed the cast and crew by doing many of his own stunts. His increasingly ill health compelled director Lester to save Keaton's strength for the major stunts and use a double for distant, routine shots of Keaton running.

Keaton's final appearance on film was in The Scribe, a 1966 safety film produced in Toronto by the Construction Safety Associations of Ontario: he died shortly after completing it.

== Style and themes ==
=== Use of parody ===
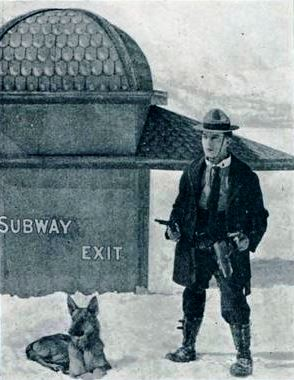
Buster Keaton in The Frozen North (1922)

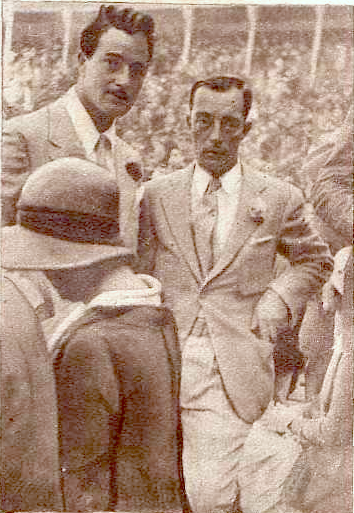
Gilbert Roland (left) with Keaton in San Sebastián, Spain, August 1930

Keaton started experimenting with parody during his vaudeville years, where most frequently his performances involved impressions and burlesques of other performers' acts. Most of these parodies targeted acts with which Keaton had shared the bill. When Keaton transposed his experience in vaudeville to film, in many works he parodied melodramas. Other favorite targets were cinematic plots, structures and devices.

One of his most biting parodies is The Frozen North (1922), a satirical take on William S. Hart's Western melodramas, like Hell's Hinges (1916) and The Narrow Trail (1917). Keaton parodied the melodramatic transformation from bad guy to good guy, which Hart's characters went through, known as "the good badman". He wears a small version of Hart's campaign hat from the Spanish–American War and a six-shooter on each thigh, and during the scene in which he shoots the neighbor and her husband, he reacts with thick glycerin tears, a trademark of Hart's. Audiences of the 1920s recognized the parody and thought the film hysterically funny. However, Hart himself was not amused by Keaton's antics, particularly the crying scene, and did not speak to Keaton for two years after he had seen the film. The film's opening intertitles give it its mock-serious tone, and are taken from Robert W. Service's "The Shooting of Dan McGrew".

In The Playhouse (1921), he parodied his contemporary Thomas H. Ince, Hart's producer, who indulged in over-crediting himself in his film productions. The short also featured the impression of a performing monkey which was likely derived from a co-biller's act (called Peter the Great). Three Ages (1923), his directorial debut, is a parody of D. W. Griffith's Intolerance (1916), from which it replicates the three inter-cut shorts structure. Three Ages also featured parodies of Bible stories, like those of Samson and Daniel. Keaton directed the film, along with Edward F. Cline. By this time, Keaton had further developed his distinct signature style that consisted of lucidity and precision along with acrobatics of ballistic precision and kineticism. Critic and film historian Imogen Sara Smith stated about Keaton's style:

the coolness and subtlety of his style [is] very cinematic in terms of recognising that the camera can pick up very, very small effects

=== Body language ===
Gilberto Perez commented on "Keaton's genius as an actor to keep a face so nearly deadpan and yet render it, by subtle inflections, so vividly expressive of inner life. His large, deep eyes are the most eloquent feature; with merely a stare, he can convey a wide range of emotions, from longing to mistrust, from puzzlement to sorrow."

Anthony Lane described Keaton's body language:

The traditional Buster stance requires that he remain upstanding, full of backbone, looking ahead... [in The General] he clambers onto the roof of his locomotive and leans gently forward to scan the terrain, with the breeze in his hair and adventure zipping toward him around the next bend. It is the angle that you remember: the figure perfectly straight but tilted forward, like the Spirit of Ecstasy on the hood of a Rolls-Royce... [in Three Ages], he drives a low-grade automobile over a bump in the road, and the car just crumbles beneath him. Rerun it on video, and you can see Buster riding the collapse like a surfer, hanging onto the steering wheel, coming beautifully to rest as the wave of wreckage breaks. ... In his coolness, his love of improvisation, his casual reluctance to be crushed, Keaton moves further away from the querulous, jumpy genius of Chaplin and closer to someone like Fred Astaire, who could come upon the chugging pistons of a ship's engines and hear within a matter of seconds the excitable rhythms of a new dance.

James Agee wrote: Keaton's face ranked almost with Lincoln's as an early American archetype; it was haunting, handsome, almost beautiful, yet it was irreducibly funny ... No other comedian could do as much with the dead pan. He used this great, sad, motionless face to suggest various related things: a one-track mind near the track's end of pure insanity; mulish imperturbability under the wildest circumstances ... an awe-inspiring sort of patience and power to endure, proper to granite but uncanny in flesh and blood. Everything that he did and was bore out this rigid face and played laughs against it. When he moved his eyes, it was like seeing them move in a statue. His short-legged body was all sudden, machinelike angles, governed by a daft aplomb. When he swept a semaphorelike arm to point, you could almost hear the electrical impulse in the signal block. When he ran from a cop his transitions from accelerating walk to easy jogtrot to brisk canter to headlong gallop to flogged-piston spring—always floating, above this frenzy, the untroubled, untouchable face—were as distinct and as soberly in order as an automatic gearshift.

Jeffrey Vance wrote:

Buster Keaton's comedy endures not just because he had a face that belongs on Mount Rushmore, at once hauntingly immovable and classically American, but because that face was attached to one of the most gifted actors and directors who ever graced the screen. Evolved from the knockabout upbringing of the vaudeville stage, Keaton's comedy is a whirlwind of hilarious, technically precise, adroitly executed, and surprising gags, very often set against a backdrop of visually stunning set pieces and locations—all this masked behind his unflinching, stoic veneer.

=== Pork-pie hats ===
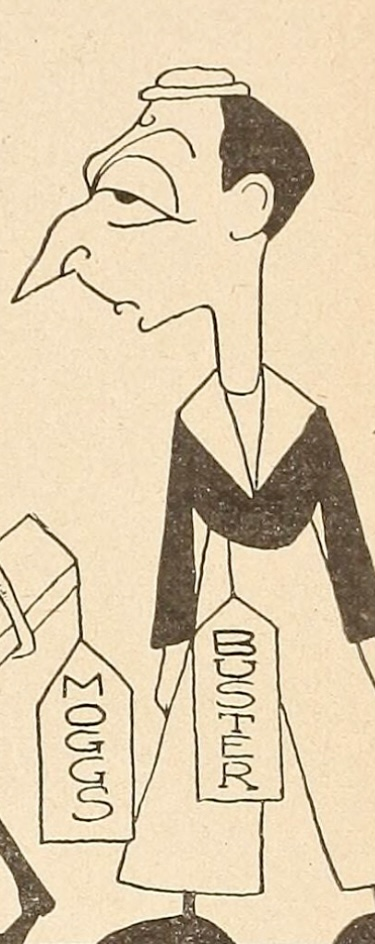
Buster Keaton caricature by John Decker from Picture-Play magazine, 1925

Keaton designed and modified his own pork pie hats during his career. In 1964, he told an interviewer that in making "this particular pork pie", he "started with a good Stetson and cut it down", stiffening the brim with sugar water. The hats were often destroyed during Keaton's wild film antics; some were given away as gifts and some were snatched by souvenir hunters. Keaton said he was lucky if he used only six hats in making a film. He estimated that he and his wife Eleanor made thousands of hats during his career. Keaton observed that during his silent period, such a hat cost him around two dollars (~$27–33 in 2022 dollars); at the time of his interview, he said, they cost almost $13 (~$116 in 2022 dollars).

== Personal life ==
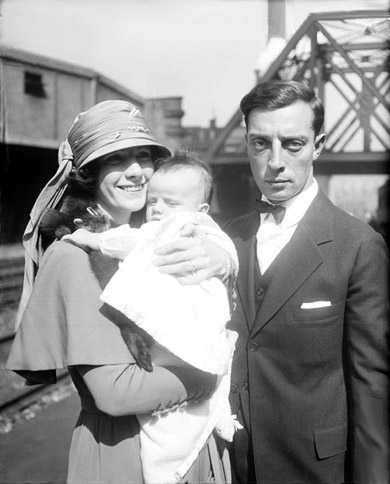
Keaton with Natalie Talmadge and Joseph in 1922

On May 31, 1921, Keaton married Natalie Talmadge, his leading lady in Our Hospitality, and the sister of actresses Norma Talmadge (married to his business partner Joseph M. Schenck at the time) and Constance Talmadge, at Norma's home in Bayside, Queens. In 1922 they had a son, Joseph, and in 1924 a second son, Robert.

After Robert's birth, the marriage began to suffer. Talmadge decided not to have any more children, banishing Keaton to a separate bedroom; he dated actresses Dorothy Sebastian and Kathleen Key during this period. Natalie's extravagance was another factor, as she spent up to a third of her husband's earnings.

Keaton had designed and built a modest cottage-like home as a surprise wedding gift for Natalie, but she was dissatisfied with its size and having no place for servants. Consequently, Keaton sold it to MGM executive Eddie Mannix at cost, and commissioned Gene Verge Sr. in 1926 to build a 10,000-square-foot (930 m^{2}) estate, the so-called Buster Keaton Italian villa, in Beverly Hills for $300,000 ($5,141,000 in 2024). Neighbors included Tom Mix and Rudolph Valentino. Among famous subsequent residents were renter Marlene Dietrich and, later, Cary Grant with his wife, heiress Barbara Hutton. James Mason and his wife Pamela purchased the home in 1948.

After attempts at reconciliation, Natalie divorced Buster in 1932, and changed the boys' surname to "Talmadge". On July 1, 1942, the 18-year-old Robert and the 20-year-old Joseph made the name change permanent after their mother won a court petition.

With the failure of his marriage and the loss of his independence as a filmmaker, Keaton descended into alcoholism. He was briefly institutionalized, according to the Turner Classic Movies documentary So Funny It Hurt. He escaped a straitjacket with tricks learned from Harry Houdini. In 1933, he married his nurse Mae Scriven during an alcoholic binge, about which he later claimed to remember nothing. Scriven claimed that she did not know Keaton's real first name until after the marriage. She filed for divorce in 1935 after finding him with Leah Clampitt Sewell, the wife of millionaire Barton Sewell II, in a hotel in Santa Barbara. They divorced in 1936 at great financial cost to Keaton. After undergoing aversion therapy, he stopped drinking for five years.

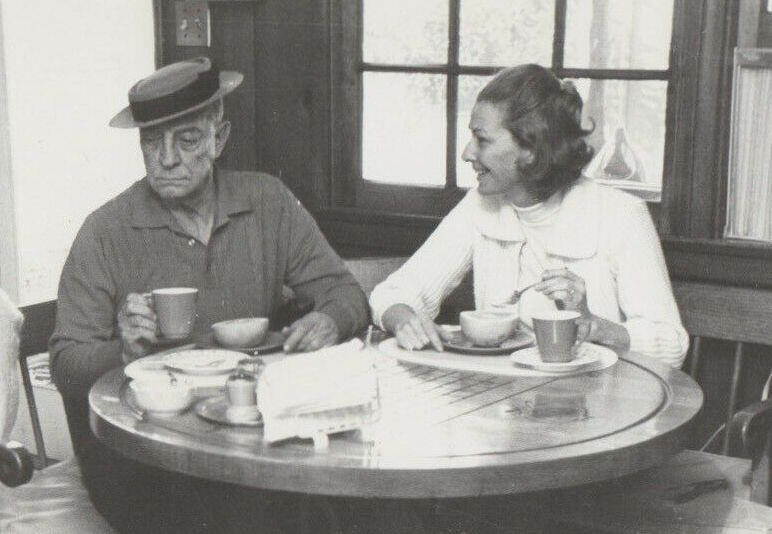
Keaton and wife Eleanor in 1965

On May 29, 1940, Keaton married Eleanor Norris, who was 23 years his junior. She has been credited with salvaging his life and career. The marriage lasted until his death. Between 1947 and 1954, the couple appeared regularly in the Cirque Medrano in Paris as a double act. She came to know his routines so well that she often participated in them in television revivals.

== Death ==
Keaton's grave at Forest Lawn Memorial Park (Hollywood Hills)

Keaton was a heavy smoker. He died of lung cancer on February 1, 1966, aged 70, in Woodland Hills, Los Angeles. Despite being diagnosed with cancer in January 1966, he was never told he was terminally ill. Keaton thought that he was recovering from a severe case of bronchitis. Confined to a hospital during his final days, Keaton was restless and paced the room endlessly, desiring to return home. In a British television documentary about his career, his widow Eleanor told producers from Thames Television that Keaton was up out of bed and moving around, and even played cards with friends who came to visit the day before he died. He was buried at Forest Lawn Memorial Park Cemetery in Hollywood Hills, California.

== Legacy ==
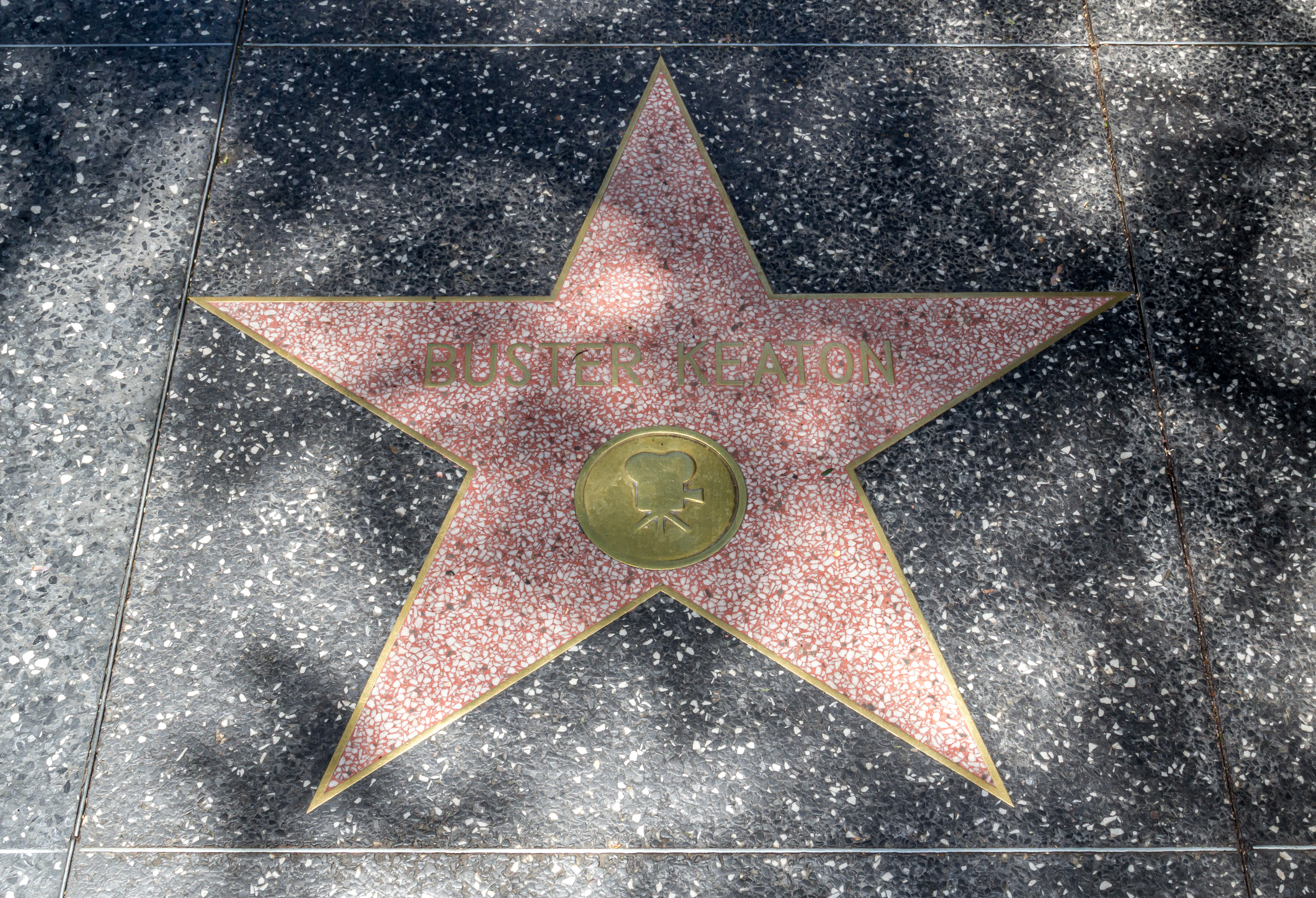
Keaton's star on the Hollywood Walk of Fame

David Thomson writes of Keaton's sense of style:

Go West is a masterpiece of the moving camera; in The Navigator the ship is a deserted, and nearly haunted, house; The General has the topographical vividness of an Anthony Mann film; and that dissolve in Seven Chances from a church empty but for Buster to one crowded out with hopeful women is typical of Keaton's instinct for interiors. ... I would swap all of Modern Times for that glorious moment in The General when Buster's meditation fails to notice the growing motion of the engine's drive shaft on which he's sitting. That illustrates the character of the dreamer so brilliantly revealed in his masterpiece Sherlock Jr..

Keaton was presented with a 1959 Academy Honorary Award at the 32nd Academy Awards, held in April 1960. Keaton has two stars on the Hollywood Walk of Fame: 6619 Hollywood Boulevard (for motion pictures); and 6225 Hollywood Boulevard (for television). The alley where Keaton shot Cops, located one block south of the Walk of Fame, was also renamed Chaplin-Keaton-Lloyd Alley in honor of Keaton and his contemporaries. Six of Keaton's films have been included in the National Film Registry: One Week (1920), Cops (1922), Sherlock Jr. (1924), The General (1926), Steamboat Bill, Jr. and The Cameraman (both 1928)

A 1957 film biography, The Buster Keaton Story, starring Donald O'Connor as Keaton was released. The screenplay, by Sidney Sheldon, who also directed the film, was loosely based on Keaton's life but contained many factual errors and merged his three wives into one character. A 1987 documentary, Buster Keaton: A Hard Act to Follow, directed by Kevin Brownlow and David Gill, won two Emmy Awards.

The International Buster Keaton Society was founded on October 4, 1992: Keaton's birthday. Dedicated to bringing greater public attention to Keaton's life and work, the membership includes many individuals from the television and film industry: actors, producers, authors, artists, graphic novelists, musicians, and designers, as well as those who simply admire the magic of Buster Keaton. The Society's nickname, the "Damfinos", draws its name from a boat in Keaton's The Boat (1921).

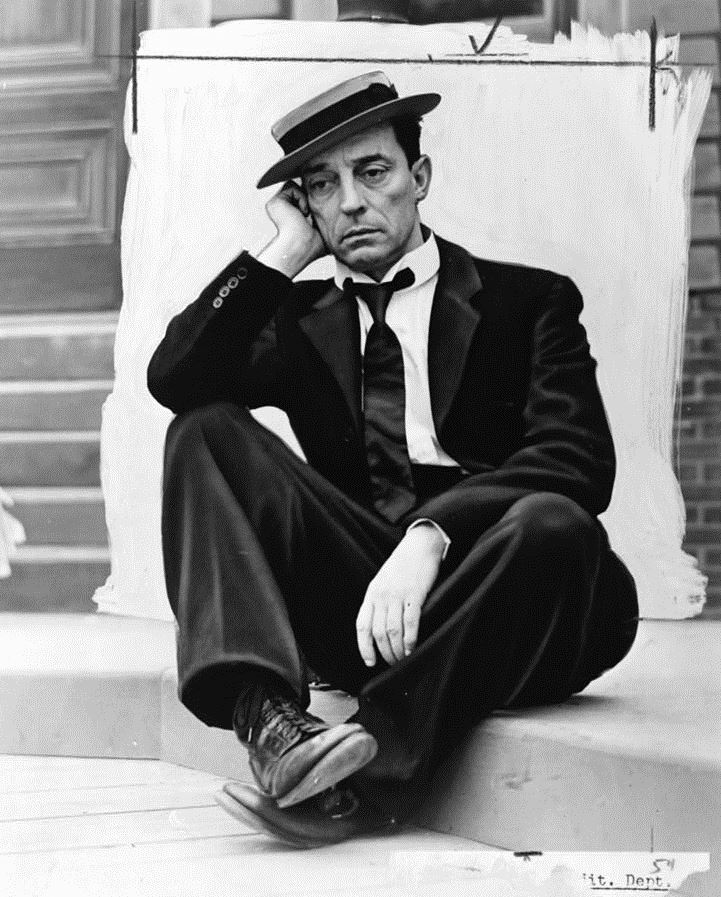
Keaton in costume with his signature pork pie hat, c. 1939

In his essay Film-arte, film-antiartístico, Salvador Dalí declared the works of Keaton to be prime examples of "anti-artistic" filmmaking, calling them "pure poetry". In 1925, Dalí produced a collage titled The Marriage of Buster Keaton featuring an image of the comedian in a seated pose, staring straight ahead with his trademark boater hat resting in his lap.

Agee analyzed his impact: "Keaton worked strictly for laughs, but his work came from so far inside a curious and original spirit that he achieved a great deal besides...He was the only major comedian who kept sentiment almost entirely out of his work, and he brought pure physical comedy to its greatest heights. Beneath his lack of emotion he was also uninsistently sardonic; deep below that, giving a disturbing tension and grandeur to the foolishness, for those who sensed it, there was in his comedy a freezing whisper not of pathos but of melancholia. With the humor, the craftsmanship and the action there was often, besides, a fine, still and sometimes dreamlike beauty."

Roger Ebert wrote, "The greatest of the silent clowns is Buster Keaton, not only because of what he did, but because of how he did it. Harold Lloyd made us laugh as much, Charlie Chaplin moved us more deeply, but no one had more courage than Buster." In his presentation for The General, Orson Welles hailed Buster Keaton as "the greatest of all the clowns in the history of the cinema... a supreme artist, and I think one of the most beautiful people who was ever photographed". Welles said Keaton was "beyond all praise... a very great artist, and one of the most beautiful men I ever saw on the screen. He was also a great director. In the last analysis, no one came near him." Critic Leslie Halliwell called Keaton "the funniest and most inventive silent clown of them all."

Mel Brooks has cited Keaton as a major influence: "I owe (Buster) a lot on two levels: One for being such a great teacher for me as a filmmaker myself, and the other just as a human being watching this gifted person doing these amazing things. He made me believe in make-believe." He borrowed the idea of the changing room scene from The Cameraman in Silent Movie. Sherlock Jr., in which a projectionist walks into another movie, influenced Woody Allen's The Purple Rose of Cairo, in which a character walks out of a movie and into real life.

In 1994, caricaturist Al Hirschfeld penned a series of silent film stars for the United States Post Office, including Rudolph Valentino and Keaton. Hirschfeld said that modern film stars were more difficult to depict, that silent film comedians such as Laurel and Hardy and Keaton "looked like their caricatures".

In 1996, Entertainment Weekly named Keaton the seventh-greatest film director, writing that "More than Chaplin, Keaton understood movies: He knew they consisted of a four-sided frame in which resided a malleable reality off which his persona could bounce. A vaudeville child star, Keaton grew up to be a tinkerer, an athlete, a visual mathematician; his films offer belly laughs of mind-boggling physical invention and a spacey determination that nears philosophical grandeur." In 2005, Richard Corliss and Richard Schickel included Sherlock Jr. on Time's All-Time 100 Movies list.

Actor and stunt performer Johnny Knoxville cites Keaton as an inspiration for Jackass projects. He re-enacted a famous Keaton stunt for the finale of Jackass Number Two. Comedian Richard Lewis stated that Keaton was his prime inspiration, and spoke of having a close friendship with Keaton's widow Eleanor. Lewis was particularly moved by the fact that Eleanor said his eyes looked like Keaton's.

In 2012, Kino Lorber released The Ultimate Buster Keaton Collection, a 14-disc Blu-ray box set of Keaton's work, including 11 of his feature films. In 2016, Tony Hale portrayed Keaton in an episode of Drunk History focusing on the silent comedian's supposed rivalry with Charlie Chaplin, who was played by musician Billie Joe Armstrong. On June 16, 2018, the International Buster Keaton Society laid a four-foot plaque in honor of both Keaton and Charles Chaplin on the corner of the shared block (1021 Lillian Ave) where each had made many of their silent comedies in Hollywood. In honor of the event, the City of Los Angeles declared the date "Buster Keaton Day".

In 2018, Peter Bogdanovich released The Great Buster: A Celebration, a documentary about Keaton's life, career and legacy. In 2022, critic Dana Stevens published a cultural history of Keaton's life and work, Camera Man: Buster Keaton, the Dawn of Cinema, and the Invention of the Twentieth Century. It was followed a month later by James Curtis' biography Buster Keaton: A Filmmaker's Life. In 2023, Keaton's life and work was depicted in the graphic biography Buster: A Life in Pictures, written by Ryan Barnett and illustrated by Matthew Tavares.

Anthony Lane wrote:

He was just too good, in too many ways, too soon... No action thriller of the last, blood-streaked decade has matched the kinetic violence at the end of Steamboat Bill, Jr., in which a storm pulls Keaton through one random catastrophe after another. Anyone who thinks that the movie-within-a-movie is a recent conceit, the province of The Purple Rose of Cairo and Last Action Hero, should check out Sherlock Jr., a film in which Keaton dreams himself into another film: he strolls up the aisle of the theatre, hops into the action, and fights to keep up with the breakneck changes of scene. As for The General, where do you start? It's a film about a train, but it's also a spirited romance, peppered with bickering and longing, and its evocation of the Civil War period has never been surpassed... He is the first action hero; to be precise, he is a small, pale-faced American who is startled, tripped, drenched and inspired into becoming a hero.

== Filmography ==
Directed features:

- Three Ages (1923)
- Our Hospitality (1923)
- Sherlock Jr. (1924)
- The Navigator (1924)
- Seven Chances (1925)
- Go West (1925)
- Battling Butler (1926)
- The General (1926)
- College (1927)
- Steamboat Bill, Jr. (1928)
- The Cameraman (1928)
- Spite Marriage (1929)
