= The Buster Keaton Story =

1957 film by Sidney Sheldon

- Theatrical release poster
- Directed by: Sidney Sheldon
- Screenplay by: Sidney Sheldon; Robert Smith
- Produced by: Sidney Sheldon; Robert Smith
- Starring: Donald O'Connor; Ann Blyth; Rhonda Fleming; Peter Lorre; Larry Keating; Jackie Coogan
- Cinematography: Loyal Griggs
- Edited by: Archie Marshek
- Music by: Victor Young
- Production company: Forum Productions
- Distributed by: Paramount Pictures
- Release date: April 21, 1957
- Running time: 91 minutes
- Country: United States
- Language: English

The Buster Keaton Story is a 1957 American biographical drama film directed by Sidney Sheldon and written by Sidney Sheldon and Robert Smith, following the life of early film star Buster Keaton. The film stars Donald O'Connor, Ann Blyth, Rhonda Fleming, Peter Lorre, Larry Keating and Jackie Coogan. It was released on April 21, 1957, by Paramount Pictures. The film was described by AllMovie as "sublimely inaccurate" regarding details of Keaton's life. It was produced by Paramount Pictures, which paid Keaton $50,000 for the rights to his life story.

== Plot ==
In the late 19th and early 20th centuries, child vaudevillian Buster Keaton stays in boarding houses, rides in train boxcars, and performs with his mother and father in a knock-about (physical comedy) act called The Three Keatons. As a young man Keaton travels on his own to Hollywood and tricks his way onto the grounds of silent-film studio Famous Studio as a workman carrying a board, as in one of his trademark comic bits.

Sneaking onto a set, he attracts the attention of a young casting director, Gloria Brent. He demonstrates his type of physical comedy to director Kurt Bergner, whom he does not impress. But Gloria recognizes his talent and recommends him to studio head Larry Winters, who offers him a contract. Keaton begins to get small parts in other people's pictures. As his comic talent becomes more apparent and his fame and money-making power grows, he is offered a contract to direct and star in his own silent films.

Dissatisfied with not sharing the profits of his films, he is told that he must invest in his own pictures in order to profit-share. He does in “The Gambler”, which is released at the same time as Al Jolson's blockbuster talkie, “The Jazz Singer”, reducing public interest in it. Buster struggles to adapt to performing in talking pictures.

He pursues a silent film star throughout his early career, Peggy Courtney, who sneers at his boarding-house manners and eventually marries a European duke in order to become a duchess. Crushed, Keaton begins drinking heavily. The casting director, Gloria, who has been interested in him and remained his friend throughout his career has been similarly disappointed by his lack of interest in her, and plans to marry a studio executive, Tom McAffee. Eventually, she confesses to her fiancé her continued interest in Keaton, and they break up. While Keaton is in a drunken black-out, she marries him in order to move in with him and take care of him so he does not die.

Buster doubts Gloria's motivation for marrying him and neglects and verbally abuses her. Things thaw between them; Buster has been offered a small part in a talking film by director Kurt Bergner. Buster quits the film in anger as he is not allowed enough screen time to develop any of his famous comedy routines.

On his way home Buster meets some children playing baseball and joins them, making up comedy bits within the game at which the children laugh. When he returns home, Gloria mistakes his elation from having made the children laugh for having gotten the motion picture part. Pretending to go to work the next day, Buster returns to the baseball field, which is empty. Some tourists recognize him and ask for his autograph. He pretends to have forgotten his wallet and borrows $10 from them, which he uses to get drunk.

Buster returns home drunk, and Gloria confronts him. He wonders aloud why she married him, and she declares her love for him. The children who played baseball with him arrive at his house to ask him to play baseball with them again. Gloria tells the children that he is sick and cannot play. Then she leaves Buster, hoping that leaving him will help him to face his drinking problem.

The children show up at Buster's house again, and he entertains them, but he falls down and hurts himself as he is still ill from drinking. He puts his mansion up for sale and moves out. He goes to see Larry, the studio head, to ask if he knows where Gloria is. Larry tells him that Gloria has resumed her old job at the studio; he calls Gloria into his office and leaves the two alone. Buster demonstrates to Gloria that he is quitting drinking, and tells her that he is returning to his roots, vaudeville. He tells her that she is free from the marriage.

Buster returns to vaudeville, where audiences still laugh at his routines. Gloria goes to see Buster backstage, and he impresses her into his act. Together, they are a hit. Buster tells Gloria that together they will be The Two Keatons. She raises three fingers to signal to him that they must be The Three Keatons, as she is expecting.

== Cast ==
- Donald O'Connor as Buster Keaton
  - Larry White as Buster Keaton, age 7
- Ann Blyth as Gloria Brent
- Rhonda Fleming as Peggy Courtney
- Peter Lorre as Kurt Bergner
- Larry Keating as Larry Winters
- Jackie Coogan as Elmer Case
- Richard Anderson as Tom McAffee
- Dave Willock as Joe Keaton
- Claire Carleton as Myra Keaton
- Dan Seymour as Indian chief
- Michael Ross as Assistant chief
- Nan Martin as Edna
- Robert Christopher as Nick
- Richard Aherne as Franklin
- Cecil B. DeMille as himself
- Richard Alexander as Tough Guy (uncredited)
- Ethan Laidlaw as Backstage prop man (uncredited)
- Buster Keaton as a cop taking a fall (uncredited)
- Minta Durfee as Boarder

== Reception ==
The film's critical reviews were mixed and its business and resulting revenue were tepid. But the harshest reviews came from Buster Keaton and his wife, who both had serious misgivings about the project from the very beginning when it was first pitched to them in 1955 by Sheldon and Smith. Keaton "knew it was going to be a disaster...They didn't know what they were talking about. You know when you've got a couple of idiots in the place, you know that," said Eleanor Keaton. And even though he was involved in the making of the movie—coaching star Donald O'Connor, supervising the comic sequences and even directing much of them in this, his own bio film.

When it first previewed in Glendale, CA in early 1957, Eleanor exclaimed, "For God's sake, it's the worst thing ever made...so awful! We sneaked out of the theater practically on our hands and knees. It was just trash." And years later Keaton would add, "The only thing I liked about it was O'Connor." Keaton's first payment from Paramount had been $19,000, so despite his dislike of the finished film, he made a special point of personally thanking Sidney Sheldon. When asked why, Keaton answered "I was able to buy a home."

== See also ==
- List of American films of 1957
