= Shake Hands with Murder =

1944 film by Albert Herman

- Poster of Shake Hands with Murder
- Directed by: Albert Herman
- Written by: Martin Mooney; John T. Neville
- Produced by: Albert Herman; Donald C. McKean
- Starring: Iris Adrian; Frank Jenks; Douglas Fowley
- Cinematography: Robert E. Cline
- Edited by: George M. Merrick
- Production company: American Productions
- Distributed by: Producers Releasing Corporation
- Release date: April 22, 1944
- Running time: 62 minutes
- Country: United States
- Language: English

Shake Hands with Murder is a 1944 American comedy mystery film directed by Albert Herman and starring Iris Adrian, Frank Jenks and Douglas Fowley. The film is a B movie released by the low-budget distributor Producers Releasing Corporation.

== Plot ==
Patsy Brent runs a small bail bond company. Her ambitious but dull-witted partner Eddie Jones secures bail for Steve Morgan, a man accused of embezzling $100,000 from his bank. Brent is furious and is forced to track Morgan before he can skip the country. When the president of the bank is found murdered, she also suspects that Morgan may even be a killer as well. However he is trying to prove his innocence of the charge, and Brent is persuaded to assist him in finding the real culprit.

== Cast ==
- Iris Adrian as Patsy Brent
- Frank Jenks as Eddie Jones
- Douglas Fowley as Steve Morgan
- Jack Raymond as Joe Blake
- Claire Rochelle as Miss Johnson, Secretary
- Herbert Rawlinson as John Clark
- Juan de la Cruz as Mr. Stanton
- I. Stanford Jolley as Mr. Haskins
- Forrest Taylor as Mr. Kennedy
- George Kirby as George Adams
- Gene Roth as William Howard
- Anitra Sparrow as Waitress
- Buck Harrington as Police Sergeant

== Bibliography ==
- Dixon, Wheeler. Producers Releasing Corporation: A Comprehensive Filmography and History. McFarland, 1986.
