= Buster Keaton: A Filmmaker's Life =

2022 book by James Curtis

- Author: James Curtis
- Language: English
- Subject: Buster Keaton
- Publisher: Knopf
- Publication date: February 15, 2022
- Pages: 832
- ISBN: 978-0-385-35421-9

Buster Keaton: A Filmmaker's Life is a 2022 book by James Curtis that examines the life of Buster Keaton.
