= James Curtis (biographer) =

American biographer

James Curtis is an American biographer. Born in Los Angeles, California, Curtis writes about important figures from the early days of film.

== Work ==
Curtis's publications include biographies of comedian W. C. Fields, director and screenwriter Preston Sturges, director James Whale, production designer William Cameron Menzies, actor Spencer Tracy. and comedian Mort Sahl. Curtis spent six years researching and writing Spencer Tracy: A Biography (2011). Film critic Leonard Maltin praised the work, saying in his review, "It represents a high-water mark in this field: a scrupulously researched life story that is also well-written and completely absorbing, through 878 pages of text".

He received the Special Jury Prize of the Theatre Library Association in 2004 for W. C. Fields: A Biography.

In 2022, Curtis wrote a biography of Buster Keaton entitled Buster Keaton: A Filmmaker's Life.
