= Buster Keaton Rides Again =

1965 Canadian documentary film

- DVD cover art
- Directed by: John Spotton
- Written by: Donald Brittain
- Produced by: Julian Biggs
- Starring: Buster Keaton; Eleanor Keaton; Gerald Potterton
- Narrated by: Michael Kane
- Cinematography: John Spotton
- Edited by: John Spotton
- Music by: Malca Gillson
- Distributed by: National Film Board of Canada
- Release date: October 30, 1965
- Running time: 55 minutes, 25 seconds
- Country: Canada
- Language: English

Buster Keaton Rides Again is a 55-minute 1965 documentary film directed by John Spotton and narrated by Michael Kane. The film is a behind-the-scenes documentary shot while Buster Keaton's film The Railrodder (1965), was being produced. Although it is a production documentary, the film is actually longer than The Railrodder, which was only 24 minutes long. Both films were produced by the National Film Board of Canada (NFB). A French version of Buster Keaton Rides Again, Avec Buster Keaton was also released.

== Synopsis ==
Buster Keaton Rides Again combines behind-the-scenes footage during the filming of The Railrodder with a retrospective of Keaton's work including scenes from The Butcher Boy (1917), The Frozen North (1922), Seven Chances (1925), and The General (1927). Keaton and Gerald Potterton, his director on The Railrodder, discussed and occasionally argued over gags in the film with the director concerned about the safety of his star. (Note: Keaton insisted that his comedic ideas about a map flapping about on his ride was not a dangerous stunt; the scene remained in the film.)

During the filming of The Railrodder, Keaton celebrated his 69th birthday. He also had the opportunity to meet fans across Canada.

== Production ==
Filmed concurrently with the production of The Railrodder during the fall of 1964, the NFB documentary was filmed in black-and-white, as opposed to the short film itself, which is in colour. The choice of black-and-white was not only for economic reasons, as the format allowed for an easy integration of the footage from Keaton's earlier films.

== Reception ==
Buster Keaton Rides Again was released with The Railrodder. The motivation behind making The Railrodder with Buster Keaton, was that "critics were rediscovering and wildly praising his great silent comedies of the '20s." Produced primarily as a made-for-television short feature on the Canadian Broadcasting Corporation (CBC), after broadcast, the film was made available on 16 mm to schools, libraries and other interested parties. The film was also made available to film libraries operated by university and provincial authorities.

== Awards ==
- 18th Canadian Film Awards, Montreal: Best Film, General Information, 1966
- Montreal International Film Festival, Montreal: First Prize, Medium-Length Films, 1966
- Golden Gate International Film Festival, San Francisco: Silver Trophy, Documentary, 1966
- International Exhibition of the Documentary Film, Venice: CIDALC Special Prize, 1966
- American Film and Video Festival, New York: First Prize, Music, Literature & Films, 1967
- Melbourne Film Festival, Melbourne: Special Prize for Best Biographical Documentary, 1967
- MIFED (Mercato internazionale del film e del documentario) International Contest of Public Relations, Milan: Gold Medal 1968
- 20th British Academy Film Awards, London: Nominee: BAFTA Award for Best Documentary, 1967

== Availability ==
Buster Keaton Rides Again and The Railrodder are available for free streaming on the National Film Board's website as well as on DVD. It is also on the NFB's YouTube channel. In Canada, the NFB itself markets the DVD, while Kino Video distributes the film in the United States.

== Bibliography ==
- Meade, Marion (22 August 1997). Buster Keaton: Cut to the Chase. New York: Da Capo Press, 1997. ISBN 978-0-3068-0802-9.
- Neibaur, James L. (2010). The Fall of Buster Keaton: His Films for MGM, Educational Pictures, and Columbia. Lanham, Maryland: Scarecrow Press, 2010. ISBN 978-0-810-87682-8.
