= The Great Buster: A Celebration =

- Poster
- Directed by: Peter Bogdanovich
- Written by: Peter Bogdanovich
- Produced by: Peter Bogdanovich; Charles S. Cohen; Roee Sharon; Louise Stratten
- Cinematography: Dustin Pearlman
- Edited by: Bill Berg-Hillinger
- Production company: Cohen Media Group
- Distributed by: Cohen Media Group
- Release date: October 5, 2018 (United States)
- Running time: 102 minutes
- Country: United States
- Language: English
- Box office: $125,807

The Great Buster: A Celebration is a 2018 American documentary film written and directed by Peter Bogdanovich. The film chronicles the life and career of iconic silent film star and comedian Buster Keaton. The film is narrated by Bogdanovich and features interviews with many industry figures such as Dick Van Dyke, Johnny Knoxville, Paul Dooley, French Stewart, Richard Lewis, Carl Reiner, Bill Hader, Mel Brooks, Cybill Shepherd, Werner Herzog, Nick Kroll, Quentin Tarantino, Leonard Maltin, Ben Mankiewicz, Bill Irwin, and Norman Lloyd. The film marked Bogdanovich's final directorial effort and Richard Lewis' final film before their deaths in 2022 and 2024 respectively.

== Reception ==
The film received critical acclaim. On the review aggregator website Rotten Tomatoes, it has a 94% approval rating, based on 47 reviews. The website's consensus reads, "The Great Buster: A Celebration isn't as breathlessly entertaining as the filmography that inspired it, but as a long-overdue primer, it's close to essential."
