= The Buster Keaton Show =

Television series

The Buster Keaton Show, also known as The Buster Keaton Comedy Show, is a television series broadcast starting in December 1949, starring Buster Keaton. It was broadcast over KTTV, which at the time was the Los Angeles affiliate of CBS (the network would start KNXT in 1951).

In 1949, comedian Ed Wynn invited Keaton to appear on his CBS Television comedy-variety show, The Ed Wynn Show, which was televised live on the West Coast. Kinescopes were made for distribution of the programs to other parts of the country, since there was no transcontinental coaxial cable until September 1951. Reaction was strong enough for a local Los Angeles station to offer Keaton his own show, also broadcast live, in 1950.

The Buster Keaton Comedy Show was Keaton's second foray into the new medium of television. It followed the 1949 one-off. Broadcast live, no record of that first program remains and it was not seen by viewers outside California, as it was not filmed in kinescope nor was there a coaxial cable linking the coasts at that time.

== The second Buster Keaton Show ==
Producer Carl Hittleman mounted a new series, titled The Buster Keaton Show, in 1951. This was an attempt to recreate the first series on film, allowing the program to be broadcast nationwide. The series benefited from a company of veteran actors, including Marcia Mae Jones as the ingenue, Iris Adrian, Dick Wessel, Fuzzy Knight, Dub Taylor, Philip Van Zandt, and his silent-era contemporaries Harold Goodwin, Hank Mann, and stuntman Harvey Parry. Keaton's wife Eleanor also was seen in the series (notably as Juliet to Keaton's Romeo in a little-theater vignette). Despite the hardworking cast and crew, the series was unsuccessful and only 13 half-hour episodes were filmed. Producer Hittleman audaciously reissued these same episodes in 1952 as though they were entirely new, with the series now titled Life with Buster Keaton. Variety reporter Fred Hift reviewed it as a series premiere, noting that it was filmed without a studio audience: the "lack of studio laughter weakened the climax of several of its acts." The producers fashioned a theatrical, hourlong feature film from the series, intended for the European market: The Misadventures of Buster Keaton was released on April 29, 1953 by British Lion, and it began playing on American television in September 1953. "Roughly reproduced slapstick museum piece, it's most likely to amuse those too young to remember the real thing," reported Josh Billings in London's Kinematograph Weekly. American television syndicators agreed, and marketed Life with Buster Keaton as a children's show. It continued to play for years afterward on small, low-budget stations.

An episode of The Buster Keaton Show, and three episodes of Life with Buster Keaton can be viewed on the Internet Archive. The former is a kinescope of a live telecast, and includes the original commercials for Studebaker cars. (This was an era where television shows typically had a single sponsor, with The Buster Keaton Show having three commercial breaks, each for Studebaker.)

== Known Surviving Episodes ==
- [First Series produced by KFI-TV 9 (KHJ-TV/KCAL) Live West Coast broadcast kinescoped for East Coast re-broadcast.]
- February 2, 1950 "The New Year's Eve Story" - (31:30) On New Year's Eve, Buster and his wife are stuck in their hotel room because Buster didn't make any reservations and everything is booked up. Every furniture gag gets used.
- February 23, 1950 "Gymnasium Story" - (27:28) Buster asks Rocky Jones help him to get into shape for an Insurance Examination.

-

- [Second Series produced by Consolidated Television Productions] * 9 of 13 episodes survive *
- Buster In Training (a.k.a. The Collapsible Clerk) - (25:27) (Pilot) Buster accidentally KO's two wrestlers and they challenge him to a rematch in the arena.(wrestlers: Great Scott & Lord Blears)
- The Army Story - (26:04) While going to get a drivers license,Buster ends up joining the Army.
- The Billboard Story - (25:35) The Little Theater is out of money so Buster tries to put up posters.
- The Detective Story - (26:31) Buster dreams he is Sam Keaton, Ace Detective. The BEST written show.
- Gone Fishing - (25:00) Foreign Spies trick Buster into helping them find a ruby.
- The Gorilla Story - (26:14) Buster runs a sporting goods store and tells a wild story of a gorilla.
- The Little Theater Story - (26:00) Buster takes the place of the lead in the play "The Great Profile"
- The Western Story - (25:47) Buster tells the story of his ancestors out west, embellishing a bit.
- The Bakery Story - (26:22) with Margaret DuMont - Buster loses his job at the sporting goods store and invests in a bakery not knowing that it is failing. (final show of the series)
