= Seeing Stars (1922 film) =

1922 Chaplin-Keaton one-reel film

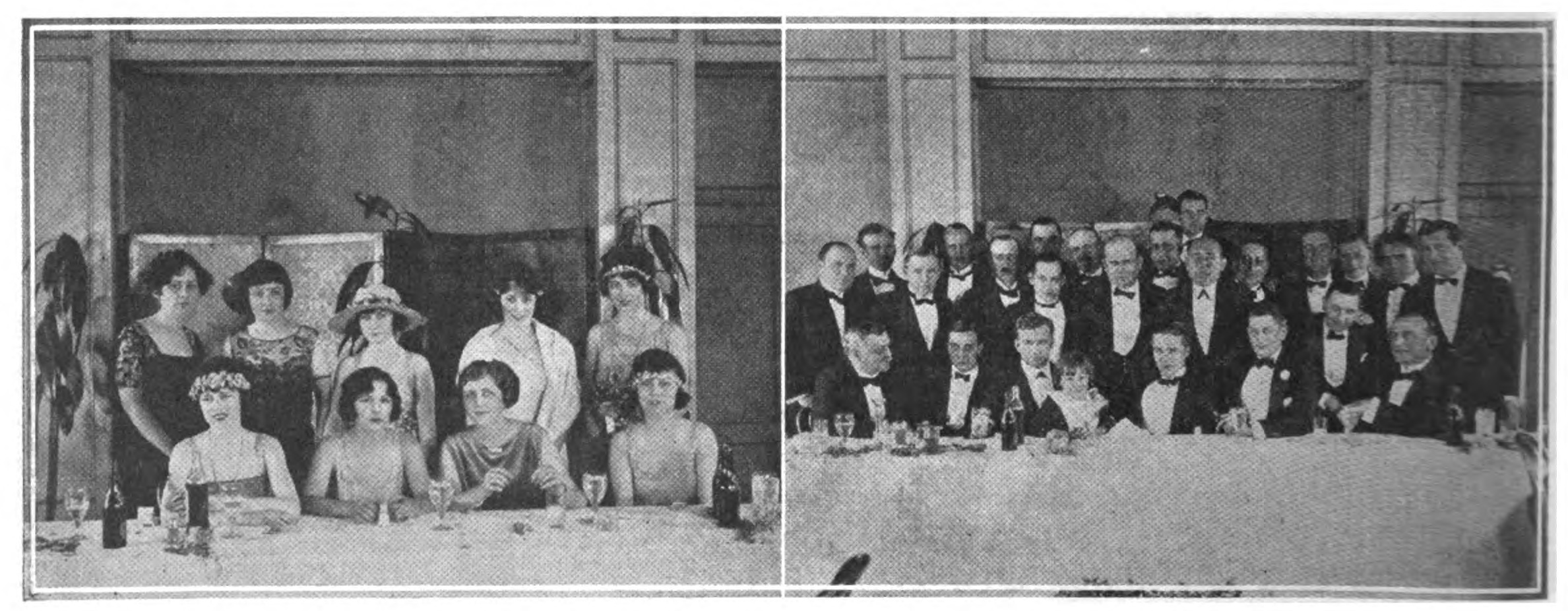
Independent Screen Artists' Guild inaugural dinner, December 15, 1921, Ambassador Hotel: In the right-hand photo, Keaton is front row, second from the left, Chaplin is center front; to the left of Keaton is Col. W. N. Selig; the boy left of Chaplin is Jackie Coogan (Exhibitors Trade Review)

Seeing Stars is a 1922 black-and-white eight-minute one-reel "trailer" film notable for a scene shared by Charlie Chaplin and Buster Keaton. Seeing Stars was one of just two times the great silent comedians appeared together onscreen; 30 years later, Limelight (1952) was the second occasion.

In the film, Chaplin and his The Kid costar Jackie Coogan share a banquet table with Thomas Ince; Buster Keaton (as himself) plays a waiter who serves them. Keaton's sisters-in-law, Norma and Constance Talmadge, also appear on-screen.

The film was produced by the Independent Screen Artists' Guild (headed by Chaplin and Norma Talmadge) and Associated First National Pictures, and was, for the most part, filmed at the Guild's December 15, 1921 inaugural banquet at the Ambassador Hotel in Los Angeles. A handful of shots are taken from other sources, such as a few frames of Keaton's The Balloonatic.

According to contemporary reports, the ISAC "planned to eliminate the middlemen and the Wall St. interests from pictures...Direct relations between exhibitors in the 18,000 theaters of the country and studios are the hope of the organizers who include all of the independent producers and the stars with their own units. They include: Charlie Chaplin, Norma Talmadge, Constance Talmadge, Mack Sennett, Buster Keaton. Sol Lesser (formerly of San Francisco), J. Parker Read, Jos. M. Schenck, Mabel Normand, Thos. H. Ince...Dorothy Phillips, Allen Holubar, Col. Wm. N. Selig, Maurice Tourneur, Richard Barthelmess, Jackie Coogan...Anita Loos...Mr. and Mrs. Carter DeHaven...Al Christie, C. H. Christie, King Vidor...Louis B. Mayer...B.P. Schulberg...and Marcia Manon."

Seeing Stars is available on the three-disc Buster Keaton: The Short Films Collection DVD set.
