= The Railrodder =

- movie poster
- Directed by: Gerald Potterton
- Written by: Gerald Potterton
- Produced by: Julian Biggs
- Starring: Buster Keaton
- Cinematography: Robert Humble
- Edited by: Jo Kirkpatrick; Gerald Potterton
- Music by: Eldon Rathburn
- Distributed by: National Film Board of Canada (NFB)
- Release date: October 2, 1965; (U.S.)
- Running time: 24 min.
- Country: Canada
- Language: (Note: While not technically a silent film, since background music and sounds are present, nonetheless, Keaton's character does not speak. Most silent films were intended to be accompanied by music and sound effects, and from the late 1920s were released with such soundtracks, so this film is in keeping with that practice.)

The Railrodder is a 1965 short comedy film starring Buster Keaton in one of his final film roles, directed and written by Gerald Potterton and produced by the National Film Board of Canada (NFB). A 25-minute comedic travelogue of Canada, The Railrodder was also Keaton's final silent film, as the film contains no dialogue and all sound effects are overdubbed.

The backdrop to all of this is the Canadian countryside, as The Railrodder provides scenic views of Nova Scotia, Quebec, Ontario, the Prairies, the Rockies and the West Coast, c. 1964-65. Cities visited by Buster include Montreal, Ottawa and Vancouver.

== Plot ==
The Railrodder (Buster Keaton) reads a newspaper in London, England. A full-page ad proclaiming "SEE CANADA NOW!" catches his attention. He promptly throws the newspaper away and jumps into the Thames. He subsequently reemerges on the east coast of Canada at Lawrencetown, Nova Scotia, having apparently swum across the Atlantic, where he is greeted by a sign indicating the direction to the other side of Canada, 3,982½ miles away.

The Railrodder starts his long hike, but soon finds a one-man, open-top rail maintenance vehicle, commonly known as a "speeder", parked on a rail track. He sits in the driver's seat intending to take a nap, but he accidentally puts the vehicle in gear, and it speeds off down the track.

In a series of mini-adventures shared by the Railrodder and the motor car, the vehicle (with an apparently inexhaustible fuel supply) follows the Canadian National Railway line across Canada. En route, the Railrodder is shown making breakfast, acting as a maid, and even doing laundry, never once intentionally stopping the vehicle aside from obtaining camouflage and preparing the motor on a swiveling bridge. A running gag involves a storage compartment in the vehicle which seems to be infinite on the inside, as he pulls out everything from pillows and a bison fur coat to a full tea service. Along the way, he also has some close calls with locomotives and even other speeders coming the other direction, but emerges harm-free each time.

The Railrodder finally arrives at the West Coast. After taking in the view for a few moments, he gets ready to start the long ride back, only to discover his rail car has been taken by a Japanese gentleman who has just emerged from the ocean — presumably the Strait of Georgia — and has decided to take his own tour of Canada. With a shrug, the Railrodder starts walking down the long track.

== Production ==
The Railrodder was produced by the National Film Board of Canada with principal photography being completed in 1964. A "behind-the-scenes" documentary short film that was released likely contains the only known footage of Keaton working behind-the-scenes on a film.

The Railrodder was made with the cooperation of the Canadian National Railway, while filming also took place on Canadian Pacific Railway, Great Northern Railway and Pacific Great Eastern Railway lines. An acknowledgment of the cooperation of railroads was given as a final title credit.

Buster Keaton Rides Again

Concurrent with the production of The Railrodder, the NFB produced the documentary Buster Keaton Rides Again which combines behind-the-scenes footage during the fall of 1964, filmed in black-and-white, as opposed to the short film itself, which is in colour. With a running time of 55 minutes, it is more than twice the length of The Railrodder. The documentary includes retrospective footage of Keaton's Hollywood career. Keaton and Gerald Potterton, his director, discussed and occasionally argued over gags in the film with the director concerned about the safety of his star. (Note: Keaton insisted that his comedic ideas about a map flapping about on his ride was not a dangerous stunt; the scene remained in the film.) During the filming of The Railrodder, Keaton celebrated his 69th birthday. He also had the opportunity to meet fans across Canada.

== Legacy ==
The motivation behind making The Railrodder with Buster Keaton, was that "critics were rediscovering and wildly praising his great silent comedies of the '20s." Produced primarily made-for-television on the Canadian Broadcasting Corporation (CBC), and after broadcast, the film was made available on 16 mm to schools, libraries and other interested parties. The film was also made available to film libraries operated by university and provincial authorities. The Railrodder and Buster Keaton Rides Again are available for free streaming on the National Film Board's website as well as on DVD. In addition it is also on the NFB's YouTube channel. In Canada, the NFB itself markets the DVD, while Kino Video distributes the film in the United States.

In 2002, Gerald Potterton was invited to the Buster Keaton Celebration in Iola, Kansas, near Keaton’s hometown of Piqua, Kansas. He was presented with The Buster Award, given for "professional excellence in the tradition of Buster Keaton." The citation for the award was: "This year's recipient, Gerald Potterton, plays a significant role in the history of comedy films. He is a crucial link from the silent comedy world of Buster Keaton to the modern sensibilities of today. How can we not be envious of his career? Not only did he get to know Buster Keaton well, but he can rightfully boast that he directed Keaton's last great film. Knowing our recipient, I suspect he would insist that in actuality Buster Keaton co-directed the movie they did together, but the truth is that, without him, the filmography of Buster Keaton would be sadly diminished. Although, in his later years, Buster Keaton worked in a lot of short films and television commercials, nothing could have been more special to that old vaudeville trouper than spending six weeks on a train, making a silent movie about train travel, courtesy of Her Majesty the Queen."

== Awards ==
- Berlin International Film Festival, Berlin: Special Commendation, 1965
- Festival of Tourist and Folklore Films, Brussels: Femina Award for Cinema, 1966
- 18th Canadian Film Awards, Montreal: Best Travel and Recreation Film, 1966
- BFI London Film Festival, London: Outstanding Film of the Year, 1966
- Locarno Film Festival, Locarno, Switzerland: Diploma of Honor, 1966
- Philadelphia International Festival of Short Films, Philadelphia: Award of Exceptional Merit, 1971
