= Iris Adrian =

American actress (1912–1994)

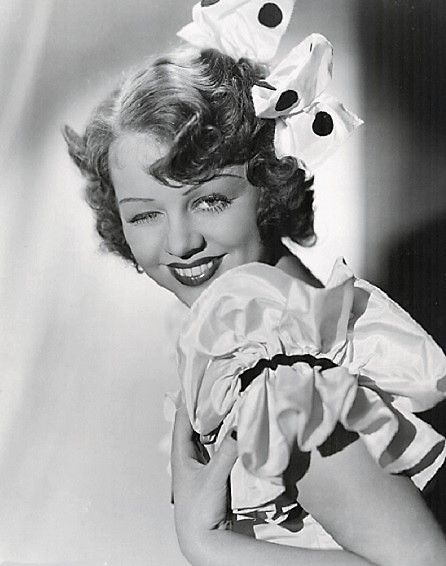
- Adrian c. 1940
- Born: Iris Adrian Hostetter; May 29, 1912; Los Angeles, California, U.S.
- Died: September 17, 1994 (aged 82); Los Angeles, California, U.S.
- Resting place: Forest Lawn Memorial Park, Hollywood Hills, Los Angeles
- Occupations: Actress; dancer
- Years active: 1928–1980
- Spouses: Charles Over (m. 1935; div. 1936) George Jay (m. 1943; div. 1945) Dan Schoonmaker (m. 1949; div. 1950) Ray F. Murphy (m. 1950; died 1983)

Iris Adrian Hostetter (May 29, 1912 – September 17, 1994) was an American stage and film actress.

== Life and career ==
Adrian was an only child, born in Los Angeles, California, to Florence (née Van Every) and Adrian Earl Hostetter, who wed in 1909 in Los Angeles. She was raised by her single mother in Los Angeles. She was a graduate of Hollywood High School.

Adrian won a beauty pageant, worked with the Ziegfeld Follies, and performed with Fred Waring before she entered films at the end of the silent era in Chasing Husbands (1928) and appeared as an extra or chorus girl in early sound films like Paramount on Parade (1930).

She continued playing incidental roles until 1936, when she landed her first major featured role in the Laurel and Hardy feature Our Relations. This led to a steady movie career, with the actress specializing in hard-boiled gals, glamorous gold-diggers, and gangsters' "molls" (she played a burlesque performer in the 1943 mystery Lady of Burlesque). Rather than being contractually bound to a single studio, she preferred to freelance and worked for both major and minor studios. Her only starring role was in Shake Hands with Murder (1944), for the low-budget PRC studio. Beginning in 1949 she was featured regularly in producer Robert L. Lippert's independently made features,

She appeared on several radio and television programs, including the Abbott and Costello Show and Life with Buster Keaton (compiled into the feature film The Misadventures of Buster Keaton).

She acted regularly, albeit without achieving star status, and by the end of the 1960s had appeared in more than one hundred films. In the Jerry Lewis comedy, The Errand Boy, she played a glamorous movie star "Anastasia Anastasia", whose on-set birthday party is wrecked by Lewis's shenanigans. In her later years she appeared in several Walt Disney films, including That Darn Cat!, The Love Bug, The Shaggy D.A., Freaky Friday, and No Deposit, No Return. Disney director Robert Stevenson considered Adrian his "good-luck charm". In these and other movies (such as The Odd Couple), she was typically cast as sharp-tongued, loudmouthed, or wisecracking waitresses, landladies, and other blue-collar neighborhood types. On television, she was a member of the cast of the unsuccessful situation comedy The Ted Knight Show in the spring of 1978. She also played numerous guest roles in television series such as Get Smart, Green Acres, Petticoat Junction, The Munsters, The Love Boat, The Lucy Show, The Beverly Hillbillies, and The Jack Benny Program.

== Personal life ==
Adrian was married to Charles Over from 1935 to 1936; the marriage ended in divorce. Her second marriage, to George Jay, also ended in divorce. On September 24, 1949, she married Dan Schoonmaker, a camera manufacturer, in Las Vegas. They separated two months later and were divorced on September 14, 1950, in Ciudad Juárez. Her fourth and final marriage was to football player Ray (Fido) Murphy, and lasted more than 30 years until his death in 1983.

Adrian had no children.

== Death ==
Adrian died in Los Angeles, as a result of a fall in her home sustained during the 1994 Northridge earthquake eight months earlier. Her ashes are within the Columbarium of Radiant Dawn at the Forest Lawn, Hollywood Hills Cemetery in Los Angeles.

== Filmography ==
=== Features ===
- The Vagabond King (1930) as Extra (uncredited)
- Lord Byron of Broadway (1930) as Lady In The Audience (uncredited)
- Paramount on Parade (1930) as Chorus Girl (uncredited)
- Let's Go Native (1930) as Chorine (uncredited)
- Midnight Daddies (1930) as Model (uncredited)
- Rumba (1935) as Goldie Allen
- Stolen Harmony (1935) as Sunny Verne
- The Gay Deception (1935) as Gettel's Wife (uncredited)
- Murder at Glen Athol (1935)
- Grand Exit (1935) as Diane, First Secretary (uncredited)
- A Message to Garcia (1936) as Muriel Randel
- One Rainy Afternoon (1936) as Cashier (uncredited)
- Stage Struck (1936) as Ms. LaRue (uncredited)
- Lady Luck (1936) as Rita
- Our Relations (1936) as Alice
- Mr. Cinderella (1936) as Lil, Maizie's Friend
- Gold Diggers of 1937 (1936) as Verna (uncredited)
- ...One Third of a Nation... (1939) as Myrtle
- Back Door to Heaven (1939) as Sugar, Burlesque Dancer
- Meet the Wildcat (1940) as Jail Cell Blonde
- Go West (1940) as Mary Lou (uncredited)
- Meet the Chump (1941) as Switchboard Operator (uncredited)
- Horror Island (1941) as Arleen Grady
- The Lady from Cheyenne (1941) as Chorus Girl (uncredited)
- Road to Zanzibar (1941) as French Soubrette
- Too Many Blondes (1941) as Hortense Kent
- Wild Geese Calling (1941) as Mazie
- Sing Another Chorus (1941) as Francine La Verne
- Hard Guy (1941) as Goldie Duvall
- New York Town (1941) as Toots O'Day (uncredited)
- Swing It Soldier (1941) as Dena Maxwellton
- I Killed That Man (1941) as Verne Drake
- Roxie Hart (1942) as 'Two-Gun' Gertie Baxter
- Rings on Her Fingers (1942) as Peggy
- To the Shores of Tripoli (1942) as Okay's Girlfriend (uncredited)
- Juke Box Jenny (1942) as Jinx Corey
- Fingers at the Window (1942) as Babe Stanton (uncredited)
- Broadway (1942) as Maisie
- Moonlight Masquerade (1942) as Contestant (uncredited)
- Orchestra Wives (1942) as Wisecracking Blonde in Bus Station (uncredited)
- Highways by Night (1942) as Blonde Chorine
- Thunder Birds (1942) (Not Listed - Reshot with Joyce Comton)
- McGuerins From Brooklyn (Two Mugs From Brooklyn) (1942)
- The Crystal Ball (1943) as Mrs. Angela Martin (uncredited)
- Calaboose (1943) as Gert, aka Ma, Sluggy's Moll
- He's My Guy (1943) as Chorus Girl (uncredited)
- Ladies' Day (1943) as Kitty McClouen
- Taxi, Mister (1943) as Diner Waitress
- Lady of Burlesque (1943) as Gee Gee Graham
- Action in the North Atlantic (1943) as Jenny O'Hara (uncredited)
- Hers to Hold (1943) as Arlene
- Submarine Base (1943) as Dorothy
- Spotlight Scandals (1943) as Bernice
- His Butler's Sister (1943) as Sunshine Twin
- Career Girl (1944) as Glenda Benton
- Million Dollar Kid (1944) as Mazie Dunbar
- Shake Hands with Murder (1944) as Patsy Brent
- Once Upon a Time (1944) as Theatregoer (uncredited)
- The Singing Sheriff (1944) as Lefty
- Swing Hostess (1944) as Marge O'Day
- I'm from Arkansas (1944) as Doris
- The Woman in the Window (1944) as Streetwalker (uncredited)
- Bluebeard (1944) as Mimi Robert
- Alaska (1944) as Kitty
- It's a Pleasure (1945) as Wilma
- Boston Blackie's Rendezvous (1945) as Martha
- Steppin' in Society (1945) as Shirley
- Road to Alcatraz (1945) as Louise Rogers
- The Stork Club (1945) as Gwen
- The Bamboo Blonde (1946) as Montana Jones
- Vacation in Reno (1946) as Bunny Wells
- Cross My Heart (1946) as Miss Baggart
- Fall Guy (1947) as Mrs. Ed Sindell
- Philo Vance Returns (1947) as Maggie McCarthy Blendon, aka Choo-choo Divine
- Love and Learn (1947) as New Danceland Hostess (uncredited)
- The Trouble with Women (1947) as Rita La May
- The Wistful Widow of Wagon Gap (1947)
- Smart Woman (1948) as Newspaper Columnist (uncredited)
- Out of the Storm (1948) as Ginger
- The Paleface (1948) as Pepper
- Miss Mink of 1949 (1949) as Mrs. McKelvey
- My Dream Is Yours (1949) as Peggy (uncredited)
- Sky Dragon (1949) as Wanda LaFern
- Flamingo Road (1949) as Blanche - Inmate of Women's Prison (uncredited)
- The Lovable Cheat (1949) as Madame Mercadet
- Mighty Joe Young (1949) as Gloria (uncredited)
- Trail of the Yukon (1949) as Paula
- Woman On Pier 13 (1949) as Club Waitress (uncredited)
- Tough Assignment (1949) as Gloria
- Always Leave Them Laughing (1949) as Julie Adams
- Bodyhold (1949) as Aggie (uncredited)
- There's a Girl in My Heart (1950) as Lulu Troy
- Blondie's Hero (1950) as Mae
- Joe Palooka in Humphrey Takes a Chance (1950) as Miss Tuttle
- Sideshow (1950) as Nellie
- Once a Thief (1950) as Pearl
- Hi-Jacked (1950) as Aggie
- Hunt the Man Down (1950) as Marie (uncredited)
- Stop That Cab (1951) as Lucy
- The Scarf (1951) as Floozy (uncredited)
- Varieties on Parade (1951) as Herself
- G.I. Jane (1951) as Lt. Adrian
- My Favorite Spy (1951) as Lola
- The Big Trees (1952)
- Carson City (1952) as Saloon Girl in Fight (uncredited)
- Crime Wave (1953) as Hastings' Girlfriend (uncredited)
- Take the High Ground! (1953) as Mrs. Butterfly (scenes deleted)
- Highway Dragnet (1954) as Sally
- The Fast and the Furious (1955) as Wilma Belding, Waitress
- The Helen Morgan Story (1957) as Louise Jensen - Secretary (uncredited)
- Carnival Rock (1957) as Celia
- The Buccaneer (1958) as Capt. Brown's Frowsy Wench
- Blue Hawaii (1961) as Enid Garvey
- The Errand Boy (1961) as Anastasia Anastasia, Actress
- Fate Is the Hunter (1964) as Woman (uncredited)
- That Darn Cat! (1965) as Landlady
- The Odd Couple (1968) as Waitress
- The Love Bug (1968) as Carhop
- The Barefoot Executive (1971) as Woman Shopper
- Scandalous John (1971) as Mavis
- The Apple Dumpling Gang (1975) as Poker Polly
- No Deposit, No Return (1976) as Housewife
- Gus (1976) as Fan's Wife
- The Shaggy D.A. (1976) as Manageress
- Freaky Friday (1976) as Bus Passenger
- Herbie Goes Bananas (1980) as Loud American Wife

=== Short subjects ===
- Chasing Husbands (1928)
- Whirls and Girls (1929) as 4th Girl (unconfirmed)
- The Freshman's Goat 20 min.. (1930)
- Don't Give Up (1930)
- College Cuties 19 min. (1930) as Iris
- Man to Man (1937)
- How to Clean House 18 min. (1948) as Isabella, The Maid
- Foy Meets Girl 17 min. (1950)
- Heebie Gee-Gees (1952) as Wally's Wife
- So You Want To Know Your Relatives 10 min. (1954) as Bubbles LaVonne (uncredited)
- So You Want to Be Pretty 10 min. (1956) as Mabel - Nurse (uncredited)

=== Selected Television Appearances ===
- Alfred Hitchcock Presents (1956) (Season 1 Episode 20: "And So Died Riabouchinska") as Macey

== Sources ==
- Terrace, Vincent. Radio Programs, 1924-1984. Jefferson, NC: McFarland, 1999; ISBN 0-7864-0351-9
- Cocchi, John. "The Films of Iris Adrian, 1972", The Real Stars. Curtis Books, 1973
- Maltin, Leonard."Interviews with Iris Adrian, 1972-73", The Real Stars 2, Curtis Books, 1973 OCLC 801245658
