= Buster Keaton filmography =

Actor filmography

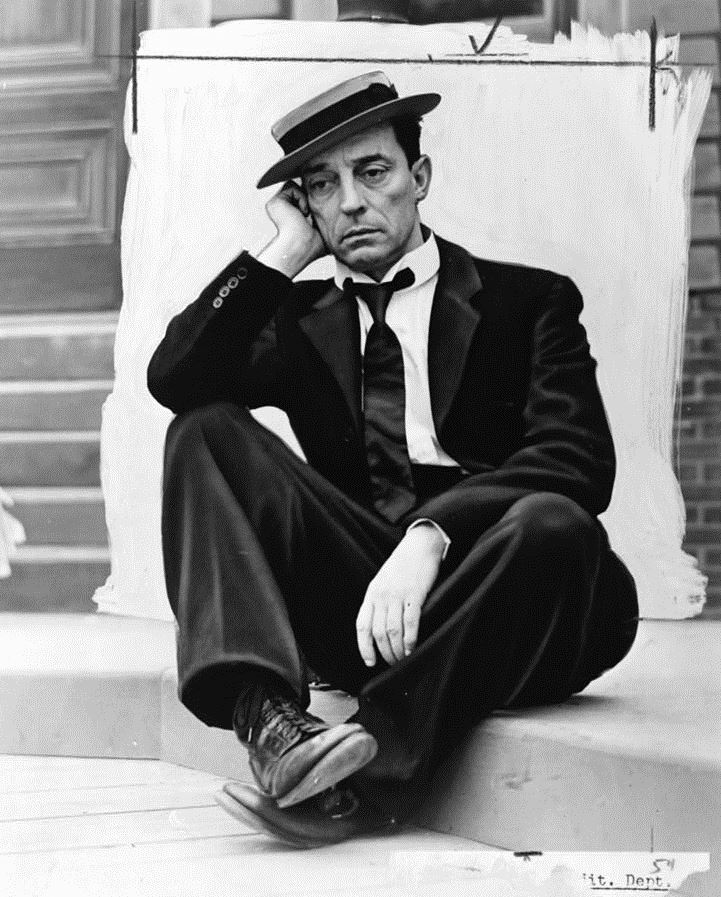
Joseph Frank "Buster" Keaton in 1939

This is a list of films by the American actor, comedian, and filmmaker Buster Keaton.

== Short films ==
=== Starring Roscoe Arbuckle, featuring Buster Keaton ===
Release date	Title	Credited as			Notes
Release date	Title	Writer	Director	Role	Notes
April 23, 1917	The Butcher Boy			Buster	First film role
June 25, 1917	The Rough House	Yes	Yes	Gardener / Delivery Boy / Cop	Co-directed and co-written by Roscoe Arbuckle
August 20, 1917	His Wedding Night			Delivery boy	—
September 30, 1917	Oh Doctor!			Junior Holepoke	—
October 29, 1917	Coney Island			Rival / Cop with mustache	—
December 10, 1917	A Country Hero			Vaudeville artist	Lost film
January 20, 1918	Out West			Sheriff / Saloon owner	—
March 18, 1918	The Bell Boy			Bellboy	—
May 13, 1918	Moonshine			Revenue agent	—
July 6, 1918	Good Night, Nurse!			Dr. Hampton / Woman with umbrella	—
September 15, 1918	The Cook			Waiter	Incomplete film
September 7, 1919	Back Stage			Stagehand	First film upon returning from service in WWI
October 26, 1919	The Hayseed			Manager, general store	—
January 11, 1920	The Garage			Mechanic / Fireman	Last film with Roscoe "Fatty" Arbuckle

=== Starring Buster Keaton under Buster Keaton Productions ===
Release date	Title	Credited as			Notes
Release date	Title	Writer	Director	Role	Notes
September 1, 1920	One Week	Yes	Yes	The groom	—
October 27, 1920	Convict 13	Yes	Yes	Golfer turned prisoner / Guard	—
December 22, 1920	Neighbors	Yes	Yes	The boy	—
December 22, 1920	The Scarecrow	Yes	Yes	Farmhand	—
February 10, 1921	The Haunted House	Yes	Yes	Bank clerk	—
March 14, 1921	Hard Luck	Yes	Yes	Suicidal boy	—
April 12, 1921	The High Sign	Yes	Yes	Our hero	Keaton's first solo film - produced before One Week.
May 18, 1921	The Goat	Yes	Yes	Buster Keaton	—
October 6, 1921	The Play House	Yes	Yes	Audience / Orchestra / Mr. Brown – First Minstrel / Second Minstrel / Interlocutors / Stagehand	—
November 10, 1921	The Boat	Yes	Yes	The boat builder	—
January 1922	The Paleface	Yes	Yes	Little Chief Paleface	—
March 1922	Cops	Yes	Yes	The young man	—
May 1922	My Wife's Relations	Yes	Yes	The husband	—
July 21, 1922	The Blacksmith	Yes	Yes	Blacksmith's assistant	—
August 28, 1922	The Frozen North	Yes	Yes	The bad man	—
October 16, 1922	The Electric House	Yes	Yes	Buster Keaton	—
November 1922	Day Dreams	Yes	Yes	The young man	Distributed by First National Pictures; Incomplete film
January 22, 1923	The Balloonatic	Yes	Yes	The young man	—
March 1923	Love Nest	Yes	Yes	Buster Keaton	Keaton's last independent two reeler.

=== Starring Buster Keaton for Educational Pictures ===
Release date	Title	Credited as			Notes
Release date	Title	Writer	Director	Role	Notes
March 16, 1934	The Gold Ghost			Wally	—
May 25, 1934	Allez Oop			Elmer	—
January 11, 1935	Palooka from Paducah			Jim Diltz	—
February 22, 1935	One Run Elmer			Elmer	—
March 15, 1935	Hayseed Romance			Elmer Dolittle	—
May 3, 1935	Tars and Stripes			Apprentice seaman Elmer Doolittle	—
August 9, 1935	The E-Flat Man			Elmer	—
October 25, 1935	The Timid Young Man			Milton	—
January 3, 1936	Three on a Limb			Elmer Brown	—
February 21, 1936	Grand Slam Opera	Yes		Elmer Butts	Screenplay by Buster Keaton and Charles Lamont
August 21, 1936	Blue Blazes			Elmer	filmed in New York
October 9, 1936	The Chemist			Elmer Triple	filmed in New York
November 20, 1936	Mixed Magic			Elmer "Happy" Butterworth	filmed in New York
January 8, 1937	Jail Bait			Office Boy	—
February 12, 1937	Ditto			The forgotten man	—
March 26, 1937	Love Nest on Wheels			Elmer	—

=== Starring Buster Keaton for Columbia Pictures ===
Release date	Title	Credited as			Notes
Release date	Title	Writer	Director	Role	Notes
June 16, 1939	Pest from the West	Yes		Sir	Screenplay by Clyde Bruckman and (uncredited) Buster Keaton
August 11, 1939	Mooching Through Georgia			Homer Cobb	—
January 19, 1940	Nothing But Pleasure			Clarence Plunkett	—
March 22, 1940	Pardon My Berth Marks			Elmer – Newspaper Copyboy	—
June 28, 1940	The Taming of the Snood			Buster Keaton	—
September 20, 1940	The Spook Speaks			Buster	—
December 13, 1940	His Ex Marks the Spot			Buster – the husband	—
February 21, 1941	So You Won't Squawk			Eddie	—
September 18, 1941	General Nuisance			Peter Hedley Lamar, Jr.	—
November 20, 1941	She's Oil Mine			Buster Waters, plumber	—

=== Starring Buster Keaton for independent producers ===
Release date	Title	Credited as			Notes
Release date	Title	Writer	Director	Role	Notes
December 31, 1947	Un Duel À Mort			Monsieur Keaton	French short for Les Films Cristal, directed by Pierre Blondy
October 15, 1952	Paradise for Buster			Buster	Industrial short for John Deere & Co., directed by Del Lord
1960	The Devil to Pay			Diablos	Industrial short for the National Association of Wholesalers
1963	There's No Business Like No Business			Owner of Service Station	Industrial short for Maremont Exhaust and the Gabriel Shocks Division of the Arvin Corporation
1963	The Triumph of Lester Snapwell			Lester Snapwell	Industrial short, filmed in color, for the Eastman Kodak Company
1965	The Fall Guy			The Fall Guy	Industrial short for U.S. Steel
January 8, 1965	Film			The Man	Experimental project by Samuel Beckett
October 2, 1965	The Railrodder			The Man	National Film Board of Canada travelogue, filmed in color, to promote travel in Canada.
January 8, 1966	The Scribe			Journalist	Industrial short for the Construction Safety Association of Ontario

=== Directed by (but not featuring) Buster Keaton for Metro-Goldwyn-Mayer ===
Release date	Title	Credited as			Notes
Release date	Title	Writer	Director	Role	Notes
February 26, 1938	Life in Sometown, USA		Yes		—
May 28, 1938	Hollywood Handicap		Yes		
September 10, 1938	Streamlined Swing		Yes		Musical Short

=== With Buster Keaton in featured or cameo roles ===
Release date	Title	Credited as			Notes
Release date	Title	Writer	Director	Role	Notes
1922	Seeing Stars			Himself	—
April 12, 1925	The Iron Mule			Indian	—
April 4, 1931	The Stolen Jools			Policeman	—
December 7, 1935	La Fiesta de Santa Barbara			Himself	—
August 6, 1936	Sunkist Stars at Palm Springs			Himself	—
May 3, 1939	Hollywood Hobbies			Himself	Third baseman on all-star baseball team

== Feature films ==
=== Starring Buster Keaton for Metro Pictures ===
Release date	Title	Credited as			Notes
Release date	Title	Writer	Director	Role	Notes
October 18, 1920	The Saphead	Yes		Bertie "The Lamb" Van Alstyne	—

=== Starring Buster Keaton under Buster Keaton Productions ===
Release date	Title	Credited as			Notes
Release date	Title	Writer	Director	Role	Notes
September 24, 1923	Three Ages		Yes	The Boy	Co-directed with Edward F. Cline
November 19, 1923	Our Hospitality		Yes	Willie McKay	Co-directed with John G. Blystone
May 11, 1924	Sherlock Jr.		Yes	Projectionist / Sherlock Jr.	—
October 13, 1924	The Navigator		Yes	Rollo Treadway	Co-directed with Donald Crisp
March 15, 1925	Seven Chances		Yes	James Shannon	—
November 1, 1925	Go West	Yes	Yes	Friendless	—
September 19, 1926	Battling Butler		Yes	Alfred Butler	—
December 31, 1926(Tokyo)	The General	Yes	Yes	Johnnie Gray	Co-written and directed with Clyde Bruckman
September 27, 1927	College		Yes	Ronald	Co-directed with James W. Horne
May 20, 1928	Steamboat Bill, Jr.		Yes	William Canfield Jr.	Co-directed with Charles Reisner

=== Starring Buster Keaton for Metro-Goldwyn-Mayer ===
Release date	Title	Credited as			Notes
Release date	Title	Writer	Director	Role	Notes
September 22, 1928	The Cameraman		Yes	Buster	Co-directed with Edward Sedgwick
April 6, 1929	Spite Marriage		Yes	Elmer Gantry	Co-directed with Edward Sedgwick
March 22, 1930	Free and Easy			Elmer	—
July 7, 1930	Estrellados			Canuto Cuadratin	Spanish-language version of Free and Easy
August 30, 1930	Doughboys			Elmer	—
January 23, 1931	De frente...marchen			Canuto de la Montera	Spanish-language version of Doughboys
February 28, 1931	Parlor, Bedroom and Bath			Reginald Irving	—
September 26, 1931	Sidewalks of New York			Harmon	—
October 19, 1931	Casanova wider Willen			Reggie Irving	German-language version of Parlor, Bedroom and Bath
December 23, 1931	Buster se marie			Reggie	French-language version of Parlor, Bedroom and Bath
February 6, 1932	The Passionate Plumber			Elmer E. Tuttle	—
August 13, 1932	Speak Easily			Professor Post	—
December 30, 1932	Le plombier amoureux			Elmer Tuttle	French-language version of The Passionate Plumber
February 10, 1933	What! No Beer?			Elmer J. Butts	—

=== Starring Buster Keaton for independent producers ===
Release date	Title	Credited as			Notes
Release date	Title	Writer	Director	Role	Notes
December 11, 1934	Le Roi des Champs-Élysées			Buster Garner / Jim le Balafré	—
January 2, 1936	The Invader			Leander Proudfoot	—
August 2, 1946	El Moderno Barba Azul			GI / Prisoner	Also known as A Modern Bluebeard and Boom in the Moon
October 30, 1965	Buster Keaton Rides Again			Himself	Documentary about the making of The Railrodder

=== With Buster Keaton in featured or cameo roles ===
Release date	Title	Credited as			Notes
Release date	Title	Writer	Director	Role	Notes
October 10, 1920	The Round-Up			Indian	Uncredited
December 23, 1928	Brotherly Love			Barber	Uncredited, appearance is speculative
April 23, 1929	Tide of Empire			Drunk thrown out of bar	Uncredited
June 20, 1929	The Hollywood Revue			Himself / Princess Raja	—
Unreleased, scheduled for September 1930	The March of Time			Caveman	—
November, 1931	Wir schalten um auf Hollywood			Himself	Truncated German-language version of The March of Time
October 13, 1939	Hollywood Cavalcade			Himself	—
July 19, 1940	New Moon			Prisoner – "LuLu"	most scenes deleted
October 11, 1940	The Villain Still Pursued Her			William Dalton	—
November 1, 1940	Li'l Abner			Lonesome Polecat	—
March 26, 1943	Forever and a Day			Wilkins	—
September 29, 1944	San Diego, I Love You			Bus Driver	—
June 1, 1945	That's the Spirit			L.M., angel	—
September 28, 1945	That Night with You			Sam	—
November 4, 1945	She Went to the Races			Bellboy	—
March 15, 1946	God's Country			Mr. Boone aka Old Tarp	—
July 25, 1946	Easy to Wed	Yes			Uncredited
April 13, 1949	Take Me Out to the Ball Game	Yes			
May 11, 1949	The Lovable Cheat			Goulard	—
July 29, 1949	In the Good Old Summertime	Yes		Hickey	—
August 1949	You're My Everything			Butler	cameo appearance
August 10, 1950	Sunset Boulevard			Himself	cameo appearance
October 23, 1952	Limelight			Calvero's Partner	—
June 14, 1953	The Enchanting Enemy			Buster	—
October 17, 1956	Around the World in 80 Days			Train Conductor – San Francisco to Fort Kearney	—
August 3, 1960	The Adventures of Huckleberry Finn			Lion Tamer	—
November 7, 1963	It's a Mad, Mad, Mad, Mad World			Jimmy the Crook	—
November 11, 1964	Pajama Party			Chief Rotten Eagle	—
April 14, 1965	Beach Blanket Bingo			Buster	—
July 14, 1965	How to Stuff a Wild Bikini			Bwana	—
August 18, 1965	Sergeant Deadhead			Airman Blinken	—
December 2, 1965	War Italian Style			General von Kassler	—
October 16, 1966	A Funny Thing Happened on the Way to the Forum			Erronius	Final film role, released posthumously

== Television appearances (incomplete) ==
- The Ed Wynn Show, (1949) as Buster
- The Buster Keaton Show, KKTV (1950) as Buster
- Life with Buster Keaton, KKTV (1951) as Buster
- Douglas Fairbanks Presents, episode "The Awakening" (1954) as The Man
- Screen Directors Playhouse, episode "The Silent Partner" (1955) as Kelsey Dutton
- The Eddie Cantor Comedy Theater S1E38 "Strange Little Stranger" as Travel Agent
- The Rosemary Clooney Show, (1956) as Keystone Policeman
- Circus Time, Buster Keaton (1957)
- What's My Line? 09/01/1957 (Episode # 326) (Season 8, Ep 35) as Mystery Guest
- The Donna Reed Show (1957) episode "A Very Merry Christmas" as Charlie
- Milky Way, Buster Keaton TV Commercial (1961)
- The Twilight Zone, episode "Once Upon a Time" (1961) as Woodrow Mulligan the Janitor
- Candid Camera, episode "In the Diner" (1962)
- The Scene Stealers, Buster Keaton and Ed Wynn (1962).
- Route 66, in "Journey to Nineveh" (1962) as Jonah Butler, the town jinx
- Mr. Smith Goes to Washington, in episode "Think Mink" (1963) as Si Willis
- Burke's Law, (1964) as Buster
- The Greatest Show on Earth (1964) S1E30 "You're All Right, Ivy" as Pippo
- Cleopatra Skit, (1964) Buster Keaton on The Hollywood Palace
- Buster Keaton and Lucille Ball, in Salute to Stan Laurel (1965) as Buster
- Alka-Seltzer, TV advertisement, (1966) as Buster
- Ford Van, TV advertisement, (1966) as Buster
