= Paradise for Buster =

- Directed by: Del Lord; Robert Cawlson (asst.)
- Written by: J. P. Pringle; John Grey; Harold Goodwin
- Produced by: A Wilding Pictures Production Presented by John Deere and Company, Inc.
- Starring: Buster Keaton; Harold Goodwin
- Cinematography: J. J. LaFleur; Robert Sable
- Edited by: William Minnerly
- Music by: Albert Glasser
- Release date: October 15, 1952
- Running time: 39 minutes
- Country: United States
- Language: English

Paradise for Buster (1952) is a private industrial film made by John Deere and Company, Inc. showcasing Buster Keaton.

== Plot ==
Bookkeeper Buster Keaton works for a company in the big city when he inherits a rural farm from his uncle Burr McKeaton and is able to quit his job. The city job sight gags include sprayed ink, tray smashing and many doors breaking glass.

Arriving at the rundown, debt-ridden farm, Buster finds a piggy bank under his uncle Burr McKeaton's portrait and while trying to break it open, winds up burning down the farm in the process. He then explores the rest of the "estate" and while trying to fix a water-stream, Buster gets caught in a windmill.

Disconsolate, he decides to end it all by tying a rock and rope around his neck and jumping off a pier into a lake on his estate. Before jumping, he notices tons of trout jumping in the lake and decides to fish instead.

Many sight gags ensue with Buster trying to catch a fish. A passerby, Harold Goodwin, offers Buster two dollars to fish in his lake.

An idea has sprouted and we next see Buster collecting money (and inserting it into many different sized piggybanks) from the city folk who arrive to pay admission to his "Fisherman's Paradise - Buster Keaton, Prop."

== Production ==
Many of the gags in this industrial short are updated versions of Buster's earlier silent film work. The glass doors breaking previously occur in 1928's The Cameraman and 1940's Pardon My Berth Marks.

The breaking of the piggybank is most similar in The Cameraman. The molasses gag harkens back to 1917's The Butcher Boy. The windmill gag is analogous to the water wheel gag in 1922's Daydreams.

The suicide gag recalls the suicide in 1922's The Electric House with the shooting of the fish reminiscent of 1923's The Love Nest. Buster only says four words in this 39 minute production: "Good morning" and "I quit."

== See also ==
- Buster Keaton filmography
