= Pest from the West =

- Directed by: Del Lord
- Written by: Clyde Bruckman; Buster Keaton
- Produced by: Jules White
- Starring: Buster Keaton; Lorna Gray; Gino Corrado; Richard Fiske; Bud Jamison; Forbes Murray; Eddie Laughton; Ned Glass
- Cinematography: Henry Freulich
- Edited by: Charles Nelson
- Distributed by: Columbia Pictures
- Release date: June 16, 1939
- Country: United States
- Language: English

Pest from the West is a 1939 American short comedy film featuring American comedian Buster Keaton. This film was a condensed remake of Keaton's English-made feature film The Invader (1935).

It is the first short subject starring Buster Keaton made for Columbia Pictures. Keaton made a total of ten short films for the studio between 1939 and 1941.

== Plot ==
Keaton is a millionaire vacationing in Mexico traveler who falls in love with a señorita and sets out to win her.

== Cast ==
- Buster Keaton
- Lorna Gray

== Production ==
This was the first film made by Columbia Pictures starring Keaton and was a condensed remake of his English-made feature film The Invader (1935). Keaton's silent-era writer Clyde Bruckman collaborated on the screenplay and it was directed by comedy veteran Del Lord. The supporting cast features Columbia regulars Lorna Gray, Gino Corrado, Richard Fiske, Bud Jamison, Eddie Laughton, and Ned Glass with the voices of short-subject stars Charley Chase and Curly Howard heard on the soundtrack.

Much of Pest from the West was filmed on location at Balboa, California, United States (Keaton repeatedly falls off his boat, into Balboa Bay). The Mexican-village settings were adapted from sets used in Columbia's 1937 feature film Lost Horizon.

== Reception ==
Pest from the West was a huge hit in theaters, and earned rave reports from exhibitors. Keaton starred in nine more Columbia shorts, the last of which was She's Oil Mine. Like Pest from the West, this borrowed content from an older Keaton feature, The Passionate Plumber.

The Film Daily called the short "one of the funniest shorts of the season. In fact, of any season. It just goes to prove that this Buster Keaton feller is a natural B.O. gold mine that is not being mined."
