= Dangerously Yours =

Dangerously Yours may refer to:

- Dangerously Yours (1933 film), an American film directed by Frank Tuttle
- Dangerously Yours (1937 film), an American film directed by Malcolm St. Clair
