= The Taming of the Snood =

- Directed by: Jules White
- Written by: Clyde Bruckman; Edwart Adamson
- Produced by: Jules White
- Starring: Buster Keaton; Dorothy Appleby; Elsie Ames; Richard Fiske; Bruce Bennett
- Cinematography: Henry Freulich
- Edited by: Mel Thorsen
- Distributed by: Columbia Pictures
- Release date: June 28, 1940
- Country: United States
- Language: English

The Taming of the Snood is a 1940 film directed by Jules White. It is the fifth short subject starring Buster Keaton made for Columbia Pictures.

== Plot ==
Buster is the owner of "Keaton's Snappy Hats" hat shop. While he is modelling hats for a customer, jewel thief Dorothy Appleby, she hides a stolen ring under the band of his boater hat. She persuades him she likes his hat and has it delivered to her apartment. When Buster arrives, the maid Elsie Ames, winds up doing many stunts and pratfalls with Buster. The jewel thief returns to her apartment and retrieves the ring and hides it on the leg of her parrot. The parrot flies out the window and Buster and the maid go after it, eventually hanging from a flagpole and careening back into the apartment with the ring. Detectives have caught up with the thief and the ring is promptly handed over to them.

== Cast ==
- Buster Keaton as the shop owner
- Dorothy Appleby as Miss Wilson
- Elsie Ames as the maid Odette
- Richard Fiske as a detective
- Bruce Bennett as a detective

== See also ==
- Buster Keaton filmography
