= General Nuisance =

- Directed by: Jules White
- Written by: Clyde Bruckman; Felix Adler
- Produced by: Jules White
- Starring: Buster Keaton; Dorothy Appleby; Elsie Ames; Monty Collins; Nick Arno; Bud Jamison; Lynton Brendt; Harry Semels
- Cinematography: Benjamin Kline
- Edited by: Jerome Thoms
- Distributed by: Columbia Pictures
- Release date: September 18, 1941
- Country: United States
- Language: English

General Nuisance (1941) is the ninth short subject starring Buster Keaton made for Columbia Pictures.

== Plot ==
Aristocratic millionaire Peter Hedley Lamar Jr. is entranced by army nurse but her cohort lets Lamar know that Dorothy is only interested in men in uniform. Lamar enlists to be near Dorothy, but Elsie tries to woo Lamar by singing a silly song to him (and Buster sings and dances!). Still interested in Dorothy, Lamar wounds himself to get under the care of Dorothy. Elsie is still after him, but Dorothy finally comes around after Lamar saves her life.

== Cast ==
- Buster Keaton as Peter Hedley Lamar Jr.
- Dorothy Appleby as army nurse Dorothy
- Elsie Ames as army nurse
- Monty Collins as Sgt. Michael Collins
- Nick Arno as recruiting doctor
- Bud Jamison as a General
- Lynton Brendt as a Captain
- Harry Semels as a Latin American delegate

== Production ==
This short is a reworking of Buster's 1930 feature Doughboys.

== See also ==
- Buster Keaton filmography
