= The Spook Speaks =

- Directed by: Jules White
- Written by: Clyde Bruckman; Ewart Adamson
- Produced by: Jules White
- Starring: Buster Keaton; Dorothy Appleby; Elsie Ames; Lynton Brent; Bruce Bennett; Don Beddoe
- Cinematography: Henry Freulich
- Edited by: Mel Thorsen
- Distributed by: Columbia Pictures
- Release date: September 20, 1940
- Country: United States
- Language: English

The Spook Speaks is a 1940 film directed by Jules White. It is the sixth short subject starring Buster Keaton made for Columbia Pictures.

== Plot ==
Buster and his wife Elsie Ames are temps sent to a house owned by a spiritualist/magician Professor Mordini (Lynton Brent), where they are to act as caretakers. Mordini leaves on a vacation and warns the couple not to let his former assistant in the house to steal his secrets. Spooky gags follow, along with a penguin on roller skates. A newlywed couple arrives (Dorothy Appleby and Don Beddoe), and the wife is fascinated by spiritualism. Mordini's vengeful former assistant Bruce Bennett breaks into the house and finds Mordini's master controls, scaring everyone out of the house at last.

== Cast ==
- Buster Keaton as the caretaker
- Elsie Ames as his wife
- Lynton Brent as Professor Mordini
- Dorothy Appleby as the newlywed wife
- Don Beddoe as the newlywed husband
- Bruce Bennett as the former assistant
- Orson the penguin

== See also ==
- Buster Keaton filmography
