= So You Won't Squawk =

- Directed by: Del Lord
- Written by: Elwood Ullman
- Produced by: Del Lord; Hugh McCollum
- Starring: Buster Keaton; Matt McHugh; Eddie Fetherston; Bud Jamison; Hank Mann; Vernon Dent; Edmund Cobb
- Cinematography: Benjamin Kline
- Edited by: Arthur Seid
- Distributed by: Columbia Pictures
- Release date: February 21, 1941
- Country: United States
- Language: English

So You Won't Squawk is a 1941 American short comedy film directed by Del Lord and starring Buster Keaton. It was written by Ellwood Ullman and was the eighth short subject Keaton made for Columbia Pictures.

== Plot ==
Handyman Eddie is mistaken for gangster Louie the Wolf. Louie encourages this deception and lets rival gangster Slugger McGraw think Eddie is him. Slugger attempts to kill Eddie many times. After one final attempt a car chase ensues with Eddie throwing various items out the window to get the attention of the police.

== Cast ==
- Buster Keaton as Eddie
- Eddie Fetherston as Louie the Wolf
- Matt McHugh as Slugger McGraw
- Bud Jamison as Tom
- Vernon Dent as bartender
- Hank Mann as workman
- Edmund Cobb as policeman

== Production ==
The chase scene is a reworking of Buster's final chase from his feature Le Roi des Champs-Élysées (1934).

== Reception ==
Boxoffice wrote: "Good. Buster Keaton gets taken lor a ride in this slapstick spree because gangsters mistake him for their dangerous rival. They toss him out of windows, over cliffs and under the gg pipe but he proves indestructiple. The only thing dead about him is his pan. There's one very funny sequence in which Buster is chased by the entire police force, and he also has a hilarious session with a nickel-nungry telephone operator."

== See also ==
- Buster Keaton filmography
