= Death in the Air =

1937 film by Elmer Clifton

- DVD cover
- Directed by: Elmer Clifton
- Written by: Charles R. Condon; Bernard McConville
- Produced by: Fanchon Royer
- Starring: Lona Andre; John Carroll; Leon Ames; Henry Hall
- Cinematography: James Diamond; Arthur Reed
- Edited by: Carl Himm
- Music by: Corson Jowett (sound) (credited as Carson Jowett)
- Production companies: Fanchon Royer Features, Inc.
- Distributed by: Distributed through "States rights"
- Release date: February 11, 1937
- Running time: 69 minutes
- Country: United States
- Language: English

Death in the Air (aka Pilot X and The Mysterious Bombardier) is a 1937 American film directed by Elmer Clifton and starring Lona Andre, John Carroll, Leon Ames and Henry Hall. The film is also known as Murder in the Air in the United Kingdom and as The Mysterious Bombardier (American reissue title). The film was Fanchon Royer's first production for her new company, Fanchon Royer Features, Inc. Film Daily reported that former FBI agent Melvin Purvis was offered a role in the film but declined.

== Plot ==
Inspector Gallagher of the United States Department of Commerce views a number of crashes and disappearances of the Goering-Gage Aviation Corporation aircraft as suspicious. With test pilot Jerry Blackwood, Gallagher visits the company. Jerry test flies Goering-Gage aircraft but finds nothing wrong. When a crash survivor claims that a mystery aircraft had attacked his plane, its owner, Henry Goering, hires psychiatrist Dr. Norris to question the man. Dr. Norris believes that a psychotic ex-World War I flying ace, whom he dubs "Pilot X," may be responsible for the attacks.

With the help of Blackwood, Goering and Norris assemble a group of five former flying aces who may have a connection with the mysterious Pilot X. He recruits German lieutenant Baron von Guttard, French lieutenant Rene Le Rue, British captain Roland Saunders, Canadian lieutenant Douglas Thompson and American lieutenant John Ives. The group meets in a mansion to devise a plan for confronting Pilot X.

However, von Guttard comes under immediate suspicion because of his son Carl, a former German prisoner of war. On the team's first patrol, Pilot X attacks, killing von Guttard. Later that day, Le Rue is killed by Pilot X and the next day, Saunders experiences a mental breakdown. Blackwood receives a note from Pilot X asking him to meet him in the sky the next morning. Thompson receives a similar note but Pilot X, who is on the airfield, paints an "X" on Thompson's aircraft.

Blackwood mistakes Thompson for Pilot X and kills him. When a paint can is found in Ives' locker, all accuse him of being Pilot X. That night, Dr. Norris calls the elder Goering, telling him that he knows the identify of Pilot X, but he is murdered. Gallagher believes that Blackwood is Pilot X and sends Ives and Saunders after him.

Helen Gage, Henry's ward, however, first finds part of Saunders' goggles near Norris' dead body, then finds the other half in his aircraft. Saunders pursues Blackwood with Helen trapped on his aircraft. Once in the sky, Pilot X appears and attacks Saunders, wounding him.

In a fierce dogfight, Pilot X attacks Blackwood but is downed. In the wreckage of Pilot X's aircraft, the body of Carl Goering is discovered, along with a photograph of him in a German uniform. He was not in fact a prisoner of war, but had deserted and joined the German Air Force. With the mystery solved, Blackwood and Helen realize that they are attracted to one another and embrace.

== Cast ==
- Lona Andre as Helen Gage
- John Carroll as Jerry Blackwood
- Leon Ames as Carl Goering
- Henry Hall as Henry Goering
- Hans Joby as Lt. Baron von Guttard (credited as John S. Peters)
- Gaston Glass as Lt. Rene La Rue
- Pat Somerset as Capt. Roland Saunders
- Wheeler Oakman as Lt. Douglas Thompson
- Reed Howes as Lt. John Ives
- Willard Kent as Inspector Gallagher
- John Elliott as Dr. Norris

== Production ==
Principal photography for Death in the Air under the working title of Pilot X began on June 25, 1936. A series of name changes ensued, and an affidavit was filed on March 10, 1938 with New York State censors to change the title to Pilot X. On May 13, 1943, the production was retitled and reissued as Mysterious Bombardier. (Note: Variety erroneously called the film "Death in the Sky".)

The aircraft used in the film include the Waco INF, Pitcairn PA 7S "Mailwing Sport", Fleet 2 and Stinson SR 8B. Stock footage from Hell's Angels (1930) with scenes of the Fokker D.VII and Sikorsky S-29-A was incorporated into the film. In addition, sequences of Boeing F2B fighter aircraft filmed at air shows were used.

== Reception ==
In the book Aviation in the Cinema, aviation film historian Stephen Pendo considered Death in the Air "a very bad, quickly made melodrama about a murder-bent ex-war pilot ... it used much stock footage." (Note: Pendo also erroneously called the film "Death in the Sky".)
