= Paradise Express =

1937 film by Joseph Kane

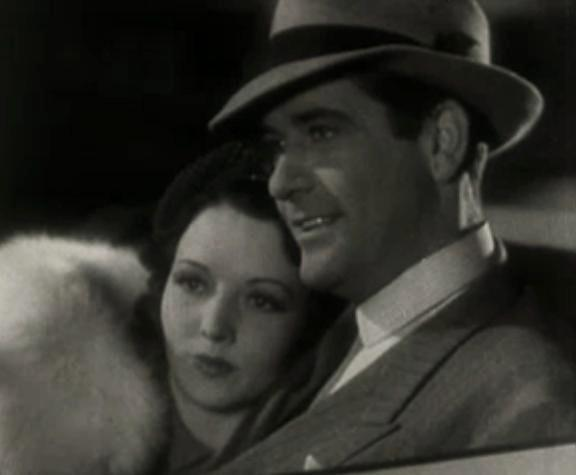
- Dorothy Appleby and Grant Withers in the film
- Directed by: Joseph Kane
- Written by: Allan Vaughan Elston (story) and Paul Perez (story); Betty Burbridge (screenplay) and Jack Natteford (screenplay)
- Produced by: Nat Levine (producer); Sol C. Siegel (associate producer)
- Starring: See below
- Cinematography: Jack A. Marta
- Edited by: Edward Mann
- Release date: February 22, 1937
- Running time: 60 minutes 53 minutes (American edited version)
- Country: United States
- Language: English

Paradise Express is a 1937 American drama film directed by Joseph Kane.

== Plot summary ==
The Moon Valley Railroad is losing money to the Armstrong Trucking Company, which is owned by gangsters. When the railroad goes into receivership, it is forced to lay off several people. The president of the railroad, Jed Carson, has acquired a hatred for the new receiver, Lawrence 'Larry' Doyle. His granddaughter, Kay Carson, also does not like Doyle. After getting himself acquainted with both Jed Carson and Kay Carson, Doyle goes and wins back some business. Kay starts to take a liking to Doyle, but her grandfather still hates him. When the new customer's freight is damaged, Doyle knows it is the Armstrong Trucking Company. After talking to Doyle, it is revealed that the owner of Armstrong Trucking, Mr. Armstrong, had Doyle appointed as the receiver, thinking it would benefit him. However, Doyle has no plans to help the Armstrong Trucking Company.

Now that the railroad has won some business back, it must work on its speed, to attract more business. Doyle asks a former railroad employee to run a fast freight to beat the trucking company's schedule. When the train is mysteriously wrecked, the town blames Doyle. However, Jed Carson does research and finds that the wreck was not Doyle's fault, and reveals it to the people of the town. Before the wreck occurred, the train beat the trucking company's schedule. When the trucking company challenges the railroad to a race for a contract, the railroad starts to win, but when the train stops for water, they find out that the water tower has been vandalized by the trucking Company. Without water for the tender, the locomotive cannot run. Doyle thinks up the idea to cut up the ice in the refrigerator cars, and pass it to the tender. Soon, the locomotive is running, and after a close call at a railroad crossing, the train rolls into paradise. Armstrong and his henchmen are convicted when one of the trucking company's employees writes a confession. The film ends with Kay embracing Doyle, for she has fallen for him.

== Cast ==
- Grant Withers as Lawrence 'Larry' Doyle
- Dorothy Appleby as Kay Carson
- Arthur Hoyt as Phineas K. Trotter
- Maude Eburne as Maggie Casey
- Harry Davenport as Jed Carson
- Donald Kirke as Armstrong
- Arthur Loft as Glover
- Lew Kelly as Tom Wilson
- Anthony Pawley as Stymie
- Fern Emmett as Landlady
- John Holland as Gus
- Robert McClung as Harmonica Player
- Bruce Mitchell as Train Conductor
- Guy Wilkerson as Skinny Smith
- George Cleveland as Farmer Beasley
- Ralph McCullough as Dispatcher
- William L. Thorne as Farmer at meeting
