= Elsie Ames =

American actress

- Born: May 18, 1902; New Jersey, United States
- Died: May 3, 1983 (aged 80); Northridge, Los Angeles, California, United States
- Occupation: Actress

Elsie Ames (May 18, 1902 – May 3, 1983) was an American comic dancer and film actress. Between 1937 and 1974 she acted in 15 films. She is best known as the female film partner of Buster Keaton.

Ames was half of the vaudeville team Ames and Arno, doing a slapstick adagio routine. Theirs was a good, standard vaudeville act, as Variety reported in 1938: "Elsie Ames and Nick Arno make every second of their knockabout routine count for laughs. Nothing seems left to chance. Also, a mid-center walloper is the encore." Ames and Arno performed their act on film in the Bing Crosby musical Double or Nothing (1937).

Elsie Ames's willingness to take pratfalls and physical punishment in the name of comedy made her a natural candidate for Columbia Pictures' short subjects. Producer Jules White had a host of male physical comedians under contract, but no female comics who could withstand the films' high slapstick content. In 1940 White hired Ames, who stood a little over 5 ft 0 in (1.52 m) tall, as a foil for the 5 ft 5 in (1.65 m)-tall Buster Keaton. She worked with Keaton in five of his 10 Columbia shorts, and received featured billing. After the final short in the series, She's Oil Mine, Keaton let his Columbia contract lapse, leaving Ames idle. White tried to keep her Columbia career going, co-starring her with Harry Langdon (in two shorts) and then El Brendel (in one final short). She left Columbia in 1942.

She made two further movies, both with Nick Arno, doing their dance specialty.

== Personal ==
Elsie Ames's daughter, Elizabeth Deering, is also an actress. Elizabeth "Betty Lou" Deering was married 1964–1983 to Seymour Cassel. Ames and her then son-in-law acted together in Minnie and Moskowitz (1971). Ames and Deering acted in A Woman Under the Influence (1974). Ames was married to her long-time vaudeville performing partner, Nicholas "Arno" Casamassima (professionally known as Nick Arno). The couple married in 1924 and performed together for decades as the comedic dance duo Ames and Arno until his death in 1958.

== Filmography ==
- Double or Nothing (1937)
- His Ex Marks the Spot (1940)
- The Spook Speaks (1940)
- The Taming of the Snood (1940)
- General Nuisance (1941)
- She's Oil Mine (1941)
- Rhythm Inn (1951)
- Houdini (1953)
- Minnie and Moskowitz (1971) as Florence
- A Woman Under the Influence (1974)
