= One Run Elmer =

1935 film

- Directed by: Charles Lamont
- Written by: Glen Lambert
- Produced by: E. H. Allen; E. W. Hammons
- Starring: Buster Keaton
- Cinematography: Dwight Warren
- Production company: Educational Pictures
- Distributed by: Fox
- Release date: February 22, 1935
- Running time: 19 minutes
- Country: United States
- Language: English

One Run Elmer is a 1935 American short comedy film featuring Buster Keaton, and directed by Charles Lamont.

== Plot ==
Elmer is the owner of a gas station somewhere on the desert highway. One day a family of ruthless businessmen show up and erect their own gas station directly opposite Elmer's and begin competing with him. The two businesses repeatedly lower their prices for gas with Elmer eventually gaining the upper hand, but when the customers arrive they believe Elmer's gas to be cheap since it is going for such a low price and get gas from the rival station instead. When a beautiful girl arrives at Elmer's station he attempts to brush all of the desert sand off of the girl's car but ends up covering her in it. While Elmer is attending to the girl, the rival businessman pumps gas into her car and flirts with the girl. He tells the girl that he runs a baseball team nearby and invites her to watch him play. Elmer, fueled by jealousy challenges the businessmen to an impromptu baseball practice and is quickly outclassed. The two agree to assemble their own teams and face one another the next day.

The beautiful girl arrives and decides she'll go on a date with whoever wins. During the game, both men resort to cheating, with the businessman tying the home base to his ankle so he can drag it closer to him, and Keaton using a bat twice its regular size. The conclusion of the game comes when Elmer steals a bullet from a nearby policeman's holster and places it inside his bat. When the opposing team pitches the ball, Elmer hits it with the bat and the resulting boom sends the ball flying across the desert, allowing Elmer to win the game. Elmer and the beautiful girl embrace but the rival businessman sneaks up and kisses the girl. The girl goes to slap the businessman but Elmer unwittingly moves into the path of the slap. Shocked, Elmer runs off across the sand as the girl chases after him.

== Cast ==
- Buster Keaton as Elmer
- Lona Andre as The Girl
- Dewey Robinson as The umpire
- Harold Goodwin as Elmer's rival
- Bobby Dunn as Ball player (uncredited)
- Jim Thorpe as Second baseman (uncredited)

== See also ==
- Buster Keaton filmography
