= Dorothy Appleby =

American actress (1906–1990)

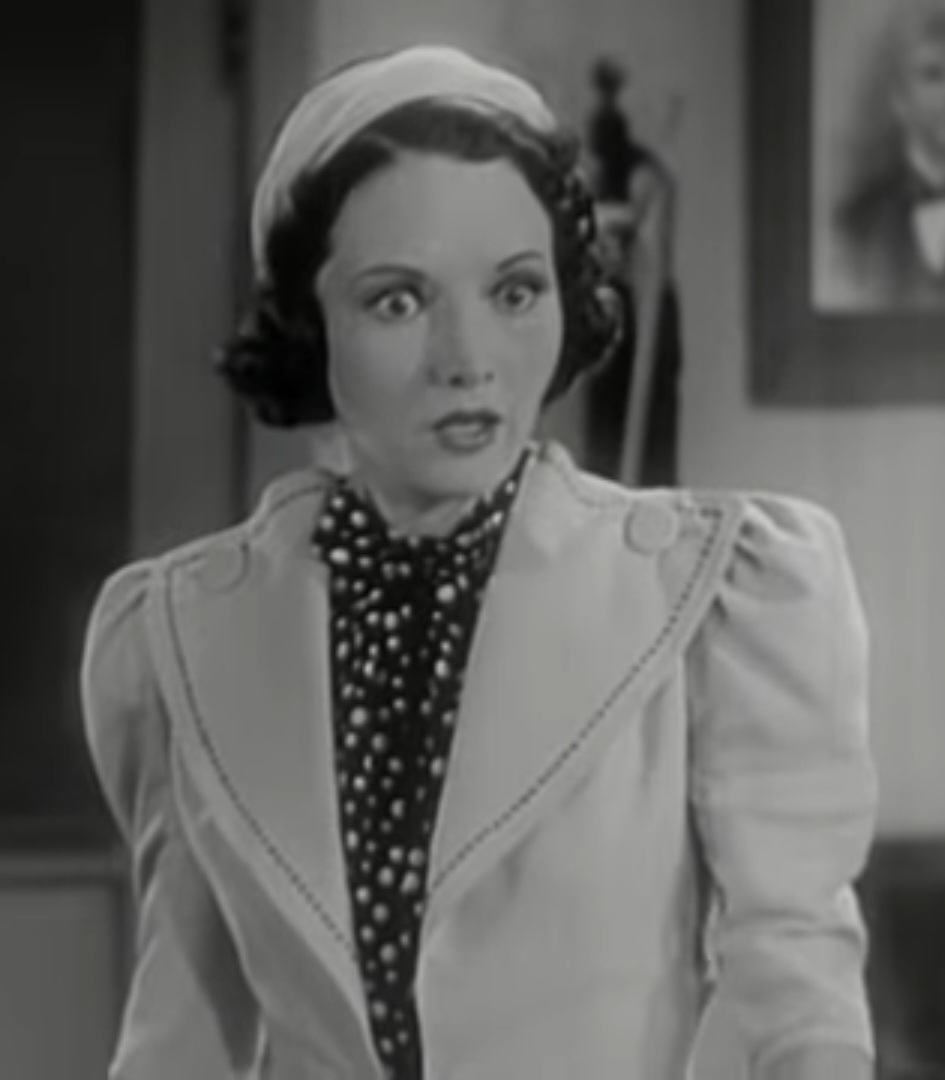
- Appleby in Paradise Express (1937)
- Born: January 6, 1906; Portland, Maine, U.S.
- Died: August 9, 1990 (aged 84); Hicksville, New York City, U.S.
- Occupation: Actress
- Years active: 1931–1943
- Spouses: Morgan H. Galloway (m. 1931; div. 1932) Paul Drake (m. 1943; div. 1980)

Dorothy Appleby (January 6, 1906 – August 9, 1990) was an American film actress. She appeared in over 50 films from 1931 to 1943.

== Early years ==
Appleby's parents were Mr. and Mrs. George F. Appleby. She first appeared on stage in Portland, Maine, her city of birth, when she was 2 1/2 years old. She sang and danced in productions at Portland High School.

== Career ==
Appleby gained early acting experience as an understudy and a chorus member in plays in New York City. A newspaper article reported that Appleby "came to New York fresh from winning a Maine beauty contest."

Appleby was seen in many supporting roles, almost always in short subjects or low-budget feature films.

Appleby soon found steady work in Columbia Pictures' two-reel comedies. She appeared frequently with The Three Stooges. She worked with Columbia comics Andy Clyde, El Brendel, and Hugh Herbert, and she had an uncredited part in John Ford's Stagecoach.

Some of Appleby's Stooge comedies were Loco Boy Makes Good, So Long Mr. Chumps, and In the Sweet Pie and Pie. One memorable appearance was as Mexican brunette Rosita in 1940's Cookoo Cavaliers. In the film, Appleby gets clobbered by the Stooges when a facial "mud pack" made of concrete dries on her face. One of her later screen roles was a one-line bit (playing a college student at age 35) in the 1941 Jane Withers feature Small Town Deb.

Broadway plays in which Appleby appeared include Princess April (1924), Puzzles of 1925 (1925), Square Crooks (1926), Young Sinners (1929 and 1931), and Springtime for Henry (1933).

== Personal life and death ==
In October 1925, newspapers reported that Appleby had married Teddy Hayes, an athletic trainer. Days later, however, Appleby contradicted that report. "Honest Injun, I'm single," she said. "Didn't mean it when I said I was married to Teddy Hayes." She married actor Morgan H. Galloway on May 11, 1931, in Harrison, New York. The marriage was kept secret for 10 days. On May 11, 1932, she was granted a divorce from Galloway.

Appleby died in Hicksville, New York on August 9, 1990, aged 84.

== Partial filmography ==
- Paradise for Two (1927) - Young girl (uncredited)
- New York (1927) - Young girl (uncredited)
- Square Crooks (1928) - Kay Ellison
- Under Eighteen (1931) - Elsie
- Trick for Trick (1933) - Maisie Henry
- King of the Wild Horses (1933) - Napeeta
- The Prizefighter and the Lady (1933) - Woman in Bar (uncredited)
- As the Earth Turns (1934) - Doris
- Jail Birds of Paradise (1934, short) - Miss Deering - Prison Warden
- School for Girls (1934) - Florence Burns
- I Give My Love (1934) - Alice Henley
- Two Heads on a Pillow (1934) - Mitzie LaVerne
- Fate's Fathead (1934, short) - Dorothy Chase
- Charlie Chan in Paris (1935) - Nardi
- Let 'Em Have It (1935) - Lola
- Riffraff (1936) - Gertie
- Lady of Secrets (1936) - Erma (uncredited)
- North of Nome (1936) - Ruby
- Paradise Express (1937) - Kay Carson
- Sea Racketeers (1937) - Dancer (uncredited)
- Make a Wish (1937) - Telephone Girl
- Fit for a King (1937) - Waitress (uncredited)
- Small Town Boy (1937) - Sandra French
- Live, Love and Learn (1937) - Lou - Bob's Model (uncredited)
- Making the Headlines (1938) - Claire Sandford
- Stagecoach (1939) - Girl in Saloon (uncredited)
- The Flying Irishman (1939) - Maybelle - a Waitress (uncredited)
- When Tomorrow Comes (1939) - Waitress (uncredited)
- The Women (1939) - Treatment Girl (uncredited)
- Nothing But Pleasure (1940, short) - Mrs. Plunkett
- Convicted Woman (1940) - Daisy
- Rockin' Thru the Rockies (1940, short) - Tessie
- Pardon My Berth Marks (1940, short) - Mary Christman
- The Doctor Takes a Wife (1940) - Woman in Book Store (uncredited)
- Gold Rush Maisie (1940) - Hatcheck Girl (uncredited)
- From Nurse to Worse (1940, short) - Dr. Lerious' Receptionist (uncredited)
- The Taming of the Snood (1940, short) - Miss Wilson
- The Spook Speaks (1940, short) - Newlywed Wife
- The Devil's Pipeline (1940) - Stewardess
- Cookoo Cavaliers (1940, short) - Rosita (uncredited)
- High Sierra (1941) - Margie - Joe's Girlfriend (uncredited)
- So Long Mr. Chumps (1941, short) - Pomeroy's Girlfriend (uncredited)
- Manpower (1941) - Wilma
- In the Sweet Pie and Pie (1941, short) - Tiska Jones
- General Nuisance (1941, short) - Army nurse Dorothy
- His Ex Marks the Spot (1941, short) - Buster's second wife
- Loco Boy Makes Good (1942, short) - Twitchell's Girl
- What's the Matador? (1942, short) - O'Brien's Secretary
- Small Town Deb (1942) - Tim's dancing partner (uncredited)
