= Six Hours to Live =

1932 film

- Directed by: William Dieterle
- Written by: Morton Barteaux; Bradley King; Gordon Morris
- Starring: Warner Baxter; Miriam Jordan; John Boles
- Cinematography: John F. Seitz
- Edited by: Ralph Dixon
- Music by: R.H. Bassett; Peter Brunelli
- Production company: Fox Film Corporation
- Distributed by: Fox Film Corporation
- Release date: October 16, 1932
- Running time: 72 minutes
- Country: United States
- Language: English

Six Hours to Live is a 1932 American pre-Code science fiction drama film directed by William Dieterle and starring Warner Baxter, Miriam Jordan and John Boles. It is based on the story "Auf Weidersehen" by Gordon Morris and Morton Barteaux.

== Plot ==
Paul Onslow, an ambassador from a small mythical country, stands in the way of an international trade agreement because it would be ruinous for his nation. He receives several threats and on the eve of the final vote he is murdered. A visiting scientist who has invented a special ray restores Onslow to life for six hours. Rather than take revenge on his killer, Onslow devotes his short reprieve to good deeds, including convincing his fiancee to forget him and marry another man; casting his vote against the trade agreement; and destroying the scientist's machine.

== Cast ==
- Warner Baxter as Capt. Paul Onslow
- Miriam Jordan as Baroness Valerie von Sturm
- John Boles as Karl Kranz
- George F. Marion as Prof. Otto Bauer
- Halliwell Hobbes as Baron Emil von Sturm
- Irene Ware as The Prostitute
- Beryl Mercer as The Widow
- Edward McWade as Ivan
- John Davidson as Kellner
- Edwin Maxwell as Police Commissioner
- Dewey Robinson as Blucher
- Eugenie Besserer as The Marquisa
- Marilyn Harris as Flower Girl
- Claude King as Conference Chairman
- Michael Mark as Townsman in Window
- Torben Meyer as Sturges - Butler
- John Reinhardt as Masher
- Bodil Rosing as Greta
- Michael Visaroff as Monsieur Thereux
- Wilhelm von Brincken as Reporter
- Hans Heinrich von Twardowski as Flosky

== Reception ==
Critic Mordaunt Hall wrote in The New York Times, "Fantastic as is the theme of 'Six Hours to Live,' William Dieterle's gifted direction and the capable performances of the principals cause it to be an unusually compelling piece of work. It may disappoint those who look for a final flash of the hero and heroine in each other's arms, but it will please others who want imagination and subtlety in screen entertainment."

Harrison's Reports wrote: "A treat awaits the picture-going public, at least such of it as appreciates art, for the industry has not yet produced the equal of it. So thrillingly fascinating it is. It is not due so much to the story as it is to the direction, and naturally to the acting. Director Dieterle's artistry has imparted delicate shadings to the mood."

== Bibliography ==
- Solomon, Aubrey. The Fox Film Corporation, 1915-1935. A History and Filmography. McFarland & Co, 2011.
