= I Give My Love =

1934 film by Karl Freund

- Directed by: Karl Freund
- Screenplay by: Doris Anderson; Milton Krims
- Story by: Vicki Baum
- Produced by: B. F. Zeidman
- Starring: Paul Lukas; Wynne Gibson; Eric Linden; Anita Louise; John Darrow; Dorothy Appleby
- Cinematography: George Robinson
- Edited by: Edward Curtiss
- Music by: Howard Jackson
- Production company: Universal Pictures
- Distributed by: Universal Pictures
- Release date: July 17, 1934
- Running time: 70 minutes
- Country: United States
- Language: English

I Give My Love is a 1934 American drama film directed by Karl Freund and written by Doris Anderson and Milton Krims. The film stars Paul Lukas, Wynne Gibson, Eric Linden, Anita Louise, John Darrow and Dorothy Appleby. The film was released on July 17, 1934, by Universal Pictures.

== Cast ==
- Paul Lukas as Paul Vadja
- Wynne Gibson as Judy Blair
- Eric Linden as Paul Vadja Jr. - at Age 21
- Anita Louise as Lorna March
- John Darrow as Alex Blair
- Dorothy Appleby as Alice Henley
- Tad Alexander as Paul Vadja Jr. - at Age 12
- Sam Hardy as Pogey
- Kenneth Howell as Frank Howard
- Louise Beavers as Woman on Street with Newspaper
