= The Navigator (1924 film) =

1924 film

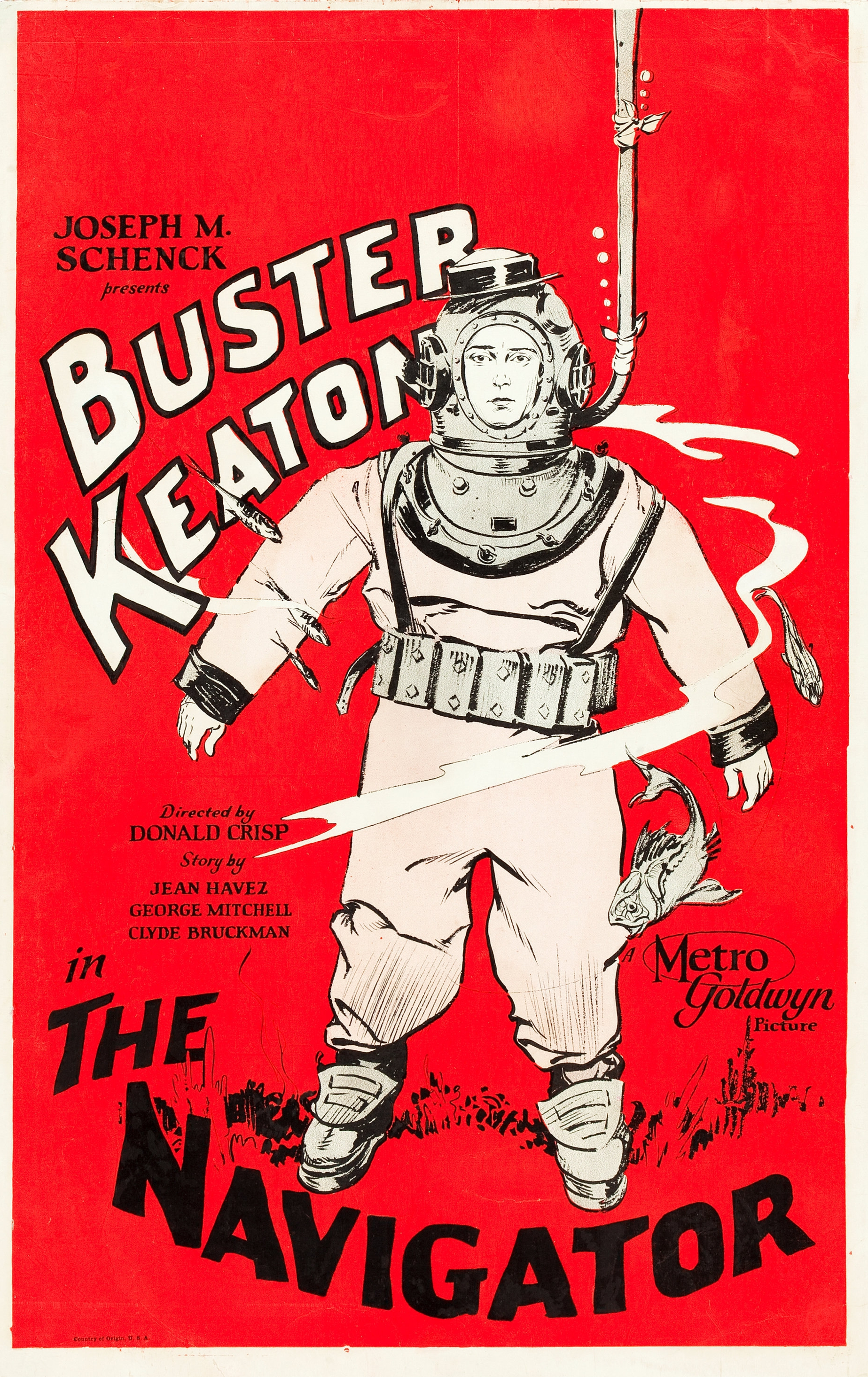
- Window Poster
- Directed by: Buster Keaton; Donald Crisp
- Written by: Clyde Bruckman; Jean C. Havez; Joseph A. Mitchell; Buster Keaton
- Produced by: Buster Keaton
- Starring: Buster Keaton; Kathryn McGuire
- Cinematography: Byron Houck; Elgin Lessley
- Edited by: Buster Keaton
- Music by: Robert Israel (1995 score)
- Distributed by: Metro-Goldwyn
- Release date: October 13, 1924
- Running time: 65 minutes (7 reels)
- Country: United States
- Language: Silent (English intertitles)
- Budget: $385,000
- Box office: $680,406

The Navigator is a 1924 American comedy film directed by and starring Buster Keaton. The film was written by Clyde Bruckman and co-directed by Donald Crisp. In 2018, the film was selected for preservation in the United States National Film Registry by the Library of Congress as being "culturally, historically, or aesthetically significant."

== Plot ==
The Navigator (1924)

Wealthy Rollo Treadway suddenly decides to propose to his neighbor across the street, Betsy O'Brien, and sends his servant to book passage for a honeymoon sea cruise to Honolulu. When Betsy rejects his sudden offer, however, he decides to go on the trip anyway, boarding without delay that night. Because the pier number is partially covered, he ends up on the wrong ship, the Navigator, which Betsy's rich father has just sold to a small country at war.

Agents for the other small nation in the conflict decide to set the ship adrift that same night. When Betsy's father checks up on the ship, he is captured and tied up ashore by the saboteurs. Betsy hears his cry for help and boards the ship to look for him, just before it is cut loose.

The Navigator drifts out into the Pacific Ocean. The two unwitting passengers eventually find each other. They sight a navy ship and hoist a brightly colored flag, not realizing it signals that the ship is under quarantine. As a result, the other vessel turns away. At first, they have great difficulty looking after themselves (both used to being served), but adapt after a few weeks, with Rube Goldberg - like devices to make coffee, open cans and boil biscuits.

Finally, the ship grounds itself near an inhabited tropical island and springs a leak. While Rollo dons a deep sea diving suit and submerges to patch the hole, the natives canoe out and take Betsy captive. When Rollo emerges from the ocean, the natives are scared off, enabling him to rescue Betsy and take her back to the ship. The natives return and try to board the ship. After a fierce struggle, Rollo and Betsy try to escape in a small dinghy. It starts to sink, and the natives swiftly overtake them in their canoes. Just when all seems lost, a navy submarine surfaces right underneath them and they are saved.

== Cast ==
- Buster Keaton as Rollo Treadway
- Frederick Vroom as John O'Brien
- Kathryn McGuire as Betsy O'Brien

=== Uncredited ===
- Noble Johnson as Chief
- Clarence Burton as Spy
- H.N. Clugston as Spy

== Production ==
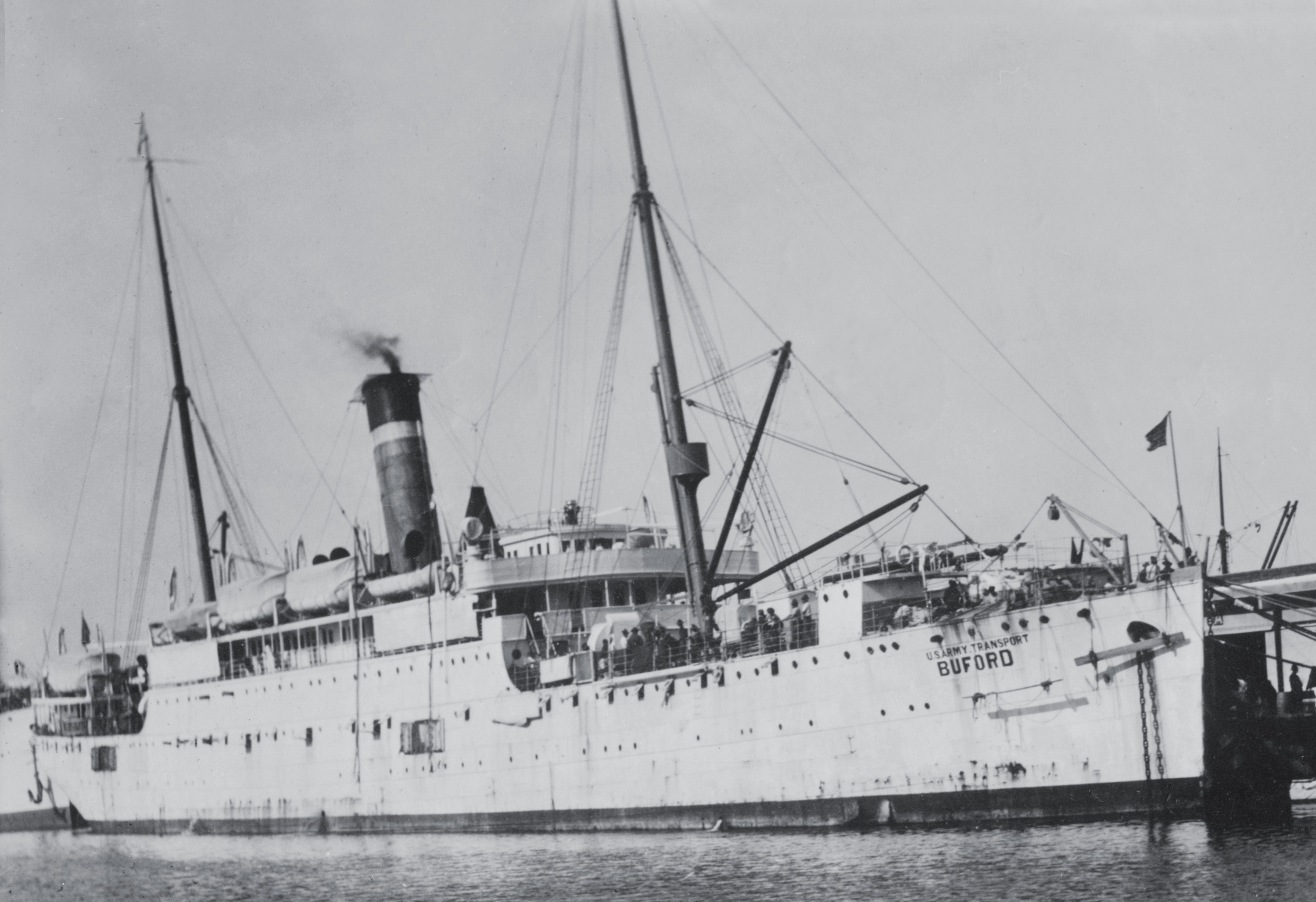
The ex-US Buford aka SS Navigator

After the disappointing reception of Sherlock Jr., Keaton and his production team's morale was low and they were looking for a project that would be both exciting and successful. While Keaton's Art Director Fred Gabourie was scouting shipyards in San Francisco for another project, The Sea Hawk, he was shown the former USAT Buford, a 5,000 ton, 500 foot ship that was being sold for scrap metal. The actual vessel was a combination passenger/cargo liner that had served as an Army transport during the Spanish–American War and World War I. Prior to The Navigator, the Buford's most controversial service had occurred in 1919–20, during the First Red Scare, when it was used as the "Soviet Ark" to deport 249 "undesirables" from the United States to revolutionary Russia, among them the noted anarchists Emma Goldman and Alexander Berkman. Gabourie was told that a film production could do anything with the ship, including set it on fire or sink it. Gabourie rushed back to Los Angeles to tell Keaton about the ship. Keaton immediately began planning a film centered around the Buford and had producer Joseph Schenck charter the boat for $25,000 with a crew and sail it to Los Angeles.

Keaton renamed the ship Navigator and his crew began remodeling the interior, installing film lights and painting it. Of the 60 person film crew about half were real sailors hired to handle the ship. Filming on board the Navigator took 10 weeks, mostly off Catalina Island. Keaton initially hired Donald Crisp to direct the dramatic scenes, leaving himself free to concentrate on the comedic ones. However, Crisp was uninterested in drama and "turned gagman overnight on me!" according to Keaton. Keaton found Crisp difficult to collaborate with and informed Crisp that the shooting was over just as an excuse to get rid of him. Keaton then resumed filming without Crisp. After completing production on board the Navigator, Keaton began shooting the underwater scenes in the Riverside municipal pool. They had to extend the pool's concrete walls to 20 feet and submerged a 12-foot prop propeller. However the extra weight in the pool caused the bottom to cave in and Keaton had to move production to Lake Tahoe to finish the underwater scenes. To cope with the cold temperature of the lake, Keaton and his cameraman drank bourbon. It took Keaton several weeks to complete what would become a few minutes of underwater footage in the finished film. The delays caused the film to go over budget, which Keaton and Schenck fought over.

== Critical reception ==
The film premiered on Columbus Day 1924 at the Capitol Theater in New York, at that time the largest movie theater in the world. At the Capitol The Navigator was a huge hit and ran for a rare second week at the theater. Overall The Navigator was Keaton's biggest hit, grossing $680,406 on a $385,000 budget. Keaton said that it was his best film.

When the film was released, Variety said, "Buster Keaton's comedy is spotty. That is to say it's both commonplace and novel, with the latter sufficient to make the picture a laugh getter..." Variety also noted the novelty of Keaton's deep-sea diving costume and settings and praised "an abundance of funny business" in some of the film's underwater scenes.

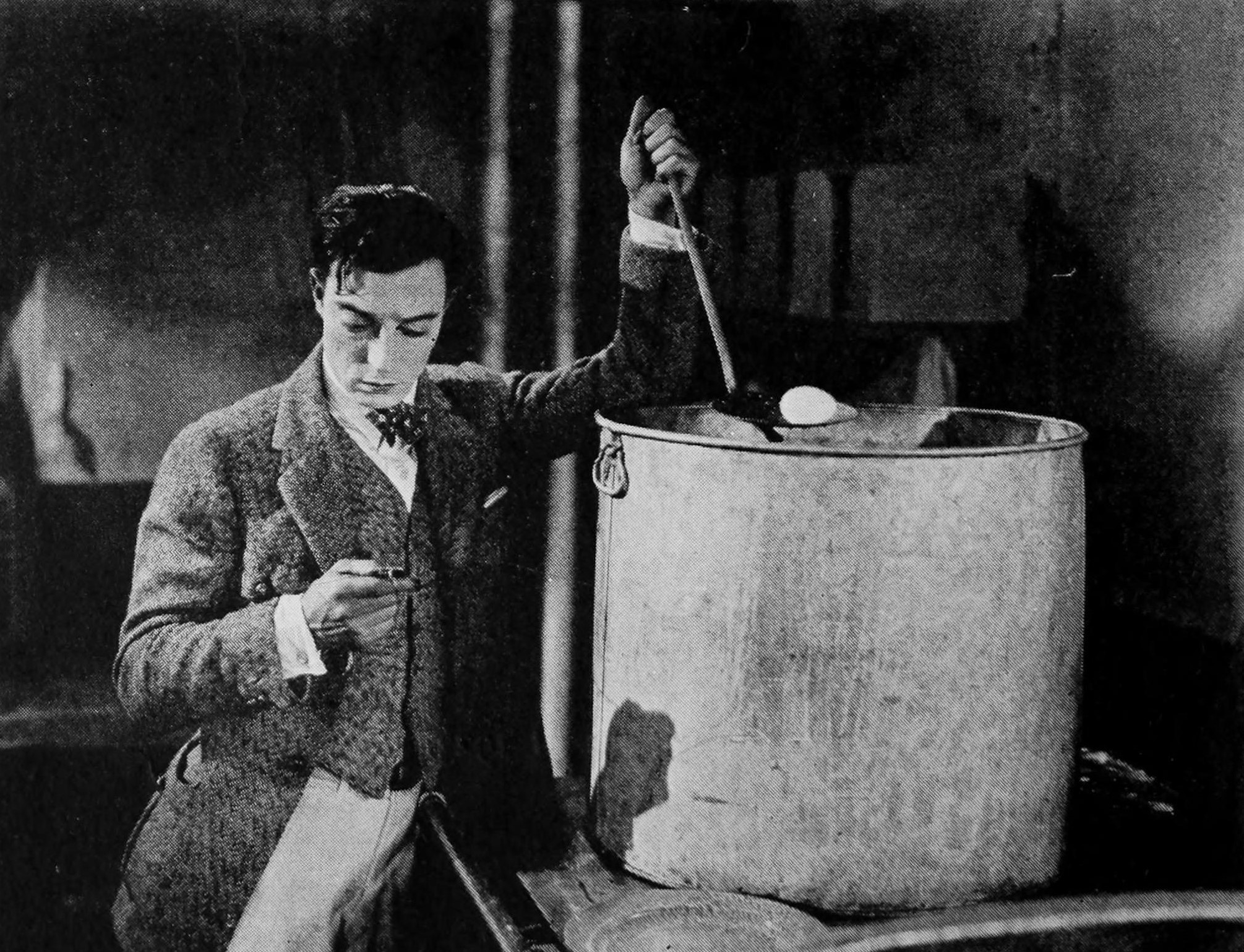
Buster Keaton in The Navigator.

More recently, film critic Dennis Schwartz wrote that the film "proved to be Keaton's biggest commercial success. Its theme of civilized man versus the machine (seen as making life difficult for modern man because we have become so dependent on it and it's not always reliable), was never used more effectively in cinema."

== Accolades ==
The film is recognized by American Film Institute in these lists: * 2000: AFI's 100 Years...100 Laughs – #81

== Preservation ==
A 16mm print of "The Navigator" (1924) is preserved at the George Eastman Museum.

== See also ==
- Buster Keaton filmography
