= Two Heads on a Pillow =

- Theatrical release poster
- Directed by: William Nigh
- Screenplay by: Albert DeMond
- Based on: The Eternal Masculine by Dorothy Canfield Fisher
- Produced by: M.H. Hoffman
- Starring: Neil Hamilton; Miriam Jordan; Henry Armetta; Hardie Albright; Dorothy Appleby; Mary Forbes
- Cinematography: Harry Neumann
- Edited by: Mildred Johnston
- Production company: Liberty Pictures
- Distributed by: Liberty Pictures
- Release date: October 2, 1934
- Running time: 68 minutes
- Country: United States
- Language: English

Two Heads on a Pillow is a 1934 American romance film directed by William Nigh and written by Albert DeMond. The film stars Neil Hamilton, Miriam Jordan, Henry Armetta, Hardie Albright, Dorothy Appleby and Mary Forbes. The film was released on October 2, 1934, by Liberty Pictures.

== Plot ==
Newlyweds (Neil Hamilton and Miriam Jordan) break up, then meet again as opposing lawyers on an annulment case.

== Cast ==
- Neil Hamilton as John C. Smith
- Miriam Jordan as Evelyn Smith / Evelyn Adams
- Henry Armetta as Enrico Populopulini
- Hardie Albright as David L. Talbot
- Dorothy Appleby as Mitzie LaVerne
- Mary Forbes as Mrs. Caroline Devonshire
- Edward Martindel as Judge Benjamin Gorman
- Claude King as Albert Devonshire
- Lona Andre as Pamela Devonshire
- Betty Blythe as Mrs. Agnes Walker
- Eddie Kane as Samuel Walker
- Claire McDowell as Mrs. Helen Gorman
- George J. Lewis as Anthony Populopulini
- Emily Fitzroy as Mrs. Van Suydam
- Nellie V. Nichols as Mrs. Rose Populopulini
- Jilda Ford as Cabaret Singer
- Mary Foy as Mrs. Jenner
- Jack Kennedy as Mr. Jenner
