= Miriam Jordan =

British actress (1904–1987)

- Born: 3 March 1904; London, England, UK
- Died: 4 December 1987 (aged 83); Great Warley, England, UK
- Occupation: Actress
- Years active: 1932–1949

Miriam Jordan (3 March 1904 – 4 December 1987) was a British stage and film actress. She enjoyed a brief career in Hollywood as a leading lady during the early 1930s, but most of her work was confined to the stage.

== Selected filmography ==
Year	Title	Role	Notes
1932	Sherlock Holmes	Alice Faulkner	
1932	Six Hours to Live	Baroness Valerie von Sturm	
1933	Dangerously Yours	Claire Roberts	
1933	I Loved You Wednesday	Cynthia Williams	
1934	Two Heads on a Pillow	Evelyn Smith	

== Bibliography ==
- Aubrey Solomon. The Fox Film Corporation, 1915-1935: A History and Filmography. McFarland, 2011.
