= Lona Andre =

American actress (1915–1992)

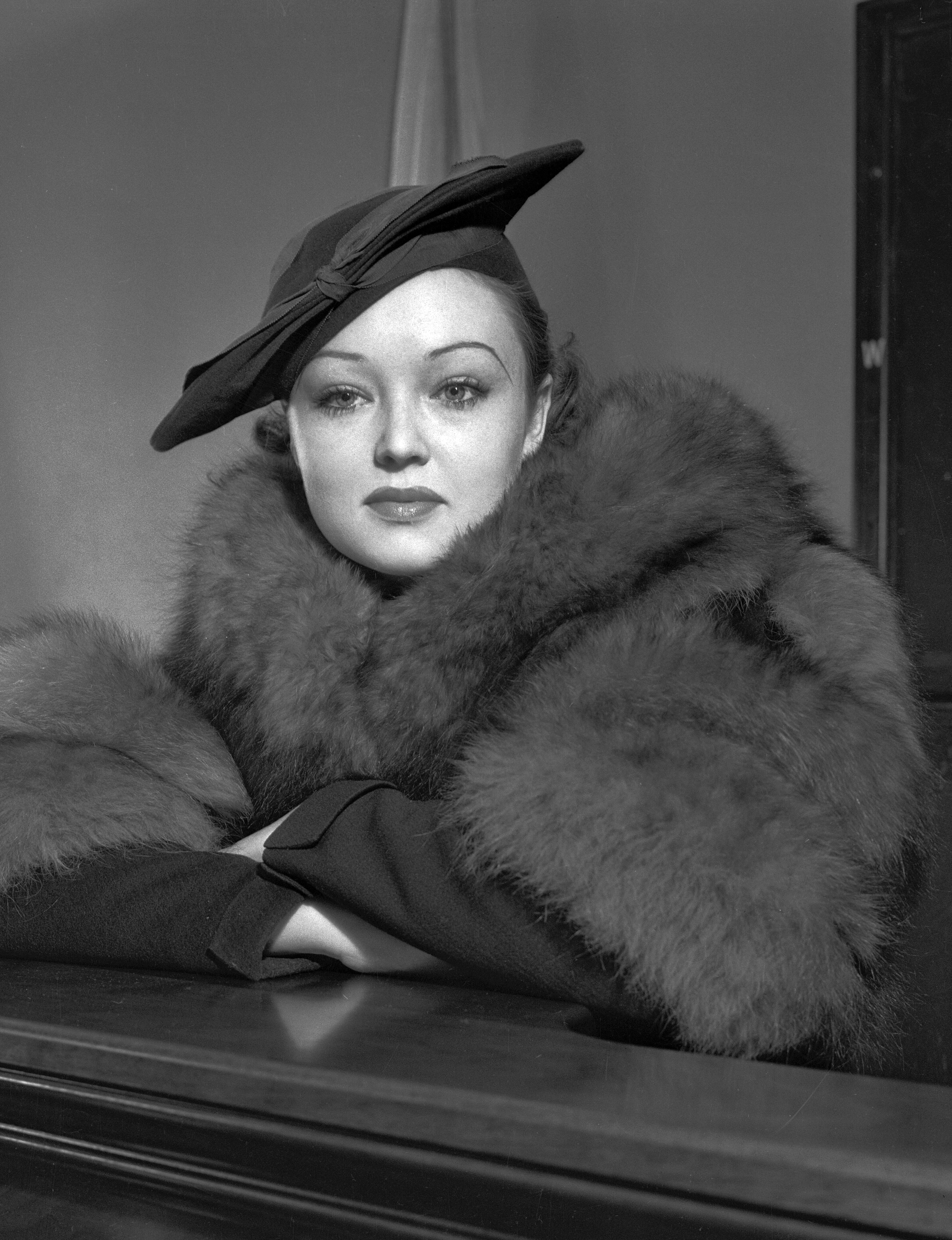
- Andre in 1935
- Born: Launa Anderson; March 2, 1915; Nashville, Tennessee, U.S.
- Died: September 18, 1992 (aged 77); Los Angeles, California, U.S.
- Resting place: Forest Lawn Memorial Park, Glendale, California
- Occupations: Actress; golfer; businesswoman
- Years active: 1933–1949
- Spouses: Edward Norris (m. 1935; annul. 1935) Richard E. Patton (m. 1942, died) James T. Bolling (div. 1947)

Lona Andre (born Launa Anderson; March 2, 1915 – September 18, 1992) was an American film actress, golfer, and businesswoman.

== Biography ==
Born in Nashville, Tennessee, Andre attracted attention with her first films in Hollywood and was named as one of the WAMPAS Baby Stars of 1932.

In 1934, she was part of the cast of School For Girls along with Toby Wing, Lois Wilson, Sidney Fox, and Dorothy Lee. In 1936 she appeared alongside Laurel and Hardy in their feature film Our Relations.

== Marriages ==
In June 1935, Andre eloped to Santa Barbara, California to marry MGM actor Edward Norris, then filed for an annulment action four days after her marriage in Tijuana, Mexico. When she worked with Buster Keaton for Educational Pictures in the mid-1930s, she enjoyed his company and they were often seen nightclubbing.

In October 1942, she married Richard E. Patton.

She was later married to salesman, James T. Bolling, and was divorced from him in March 1947. (An Associated Press story dated May 23, 1947, reported that a judge granted the divorce "yesterday", which would have been May 22, 1947.)

== Golf ==
In 1938, Andre set a then world golfing record for women by shooting 156 holes of golf in 11 hours and 56 minutes on the Lake Norconian, California course. Her best round was 91 strokes for 18 holes and her worst was 115.

== Post-acting career ==
Her acting career greatly diminished during the 1940s, and she made her last film appearance in 1943, in the Hal Roach featurette Taxi, Mister. After her film career ended she became a successful real estate broker and never returned to acting.

== Filmography ==
Year	Title	Role	Notes
1933	The Mysterious Rider	Dorothy	
1933	The Woman Accused	Cora Matthews	
1933	Pick-Up	Party Girl	Uncredited
1933	The Girl in 419	Chambermaid	Uncredited
1933	International House	Chorus Queen	
1933	College Humor	Ginger Chadwick	
1933	Her Bodyguard	Hat Check Girl	Uncredited
1933	Too Much Harmony	Show Girl	Uncredited
1933	The Way to Love	M. Prial's Assistant	Uncredited
1933	Take a Chance	Miss Miami Beach	
1934	School for Girls	Peggy	
1934	Come on Marines!	Shirley	
1934	Woman Unafraid	Peggy	
1934	Let's Be Ritzy	Store Clerk	
1934	Murder at the Vanities	Lona - Earl Carroll Girl	Uncredited
1934	The Old Fashioned Way	Girl in Audience	Uncredited
1934	Two Heads on a Pillow	Pamela Devonshire	
1934	The Merry Widow	Maid to Sonia	Uncredited
1934	By Your Leave	Florence Purcell	
1934	Lost in the Stratosphere	Sophie	
1935	One Run Elmer	The Girl	Short
1935	Under the Pampas Moon	Girl	Uncredited
1935	Border Brigands	Diane	
1935	Broadway Melody of 1936	Showgirl	Uncredited
1935	Happiness C.O.D.	Beatrice Manning	
1935	Skybound	Teddy Blaine	
1935	The Timid Young Man	Helen	Short
1936	Custer's Last Stand	Belle Meade	Serial
1936	Three on a Limb	Molly	Short
1936	Lucky Terror	Ann Thornton aka Madame Fatima	
1936	Our Relations	Lily	
1936	The Plainsman	Southern Belle	Uncredited
1936	Death in the Air	Helen Gage	
1937	High Hat	Dixie Durkin	
1937	The Great Hospital Mystery	Miss White	Uncredited
1937	Slaves in Bondage	Dona Lee	
1937	Trailin' Trouble	Patience 'Patty' Blair	
1938	Sunset Murder Case	Nita Madera	
1938	Race Suicide	Florence Davis	
1940	Ghost Valley Raiders	Linda Marley	
1940	A Night at Earl Carroll's	Chorus Girl	Uncredited
1941	You're the One	Girl	
1942	Pardon My Sarong	Girl on Bus with Tommy	Uncredited
1943	Taxi, Mister	Chorus Girl	
1943	Confessions of a Vice Baron	Florence Davis (edited from 'Race Suicide')	Uncredited, (archive footage)
1949	Two Knights from Brooklyn	Chorus Girl	Uncredited, (archive footage)

== Sources ==
- Liebman, Roy (2000). The Wampas Baby Stars: A Biographical Dictionary, 1922–1934. Jefferson, North Carolina: McFarland. ISBN 0-7864-0756-5.
