= Fanchon Royer =

American film producer

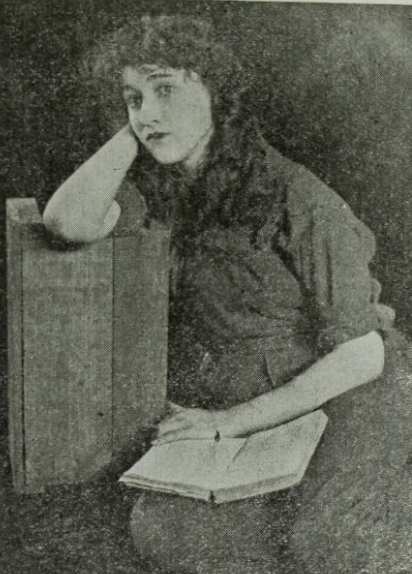
- Fanchon Royer, from a 1919 publication
- Born: January 21, 1902; Des Moines, Iowa, United States
- Died: September 24, 1986 (aged 84); Los Angeles, California, United States
- Occupation: Producer
- Years active: 1932–1938 (film production)

Fanchon Royer (1902–1986) was an American film producer, active during the 1930s. She was one of the few woman producers in Hollywood during the era, associated with low-budget independent studios such as Mayfair Pictures.

After graduating from the University of Southern California, she entered films during the silent era as an extra. Later work as a film journalist and publicity agent led on to her career as a poverty row producer. In 1936 she was production assistant to Nat Levine at Republic Pictures, but resigned to establish her own company. However this only produced one film.

Following her film career, she moved to Mexico and upon the suggestion of Monsignor Edward R. Kirk, she became a successful writer. Her work focused on Catholic themes in the American Southwest and Mexico with her most noted titles being: The Franciscans Came First (St. Anthony Guild, 1951), The Tenth Muse: Sor Juana Ines de la Cruz (St. Anthony Guild, 1952), St. Francis Solanus, Apostle to America (St. Anthony Guild, 1955), Padre Pro (Kenedy, 1954), The Power of Little Children (Academy Library Guild, 1954), and St. Anthony Claret (Farrar, 1957).

She was married to the actor Raymond Cannon from 1920 until they divorced in 1931.

== Selected filmography ==
- Cannonball Express (1932)
- The Heart Punch (1932)
- Behind Jury Doors (1932)
- The Honor of the Press (1932)
- Revenge at Monte Carlo (1933)
- Neighbors' Wives (1933)
- Her Resale Value (1933)
- Alimony Madness (1933)
- Fighting Lady (1935)
- Ten Laps to Go (1936)
- Mile-a-Minute-Love (1937)
- A Million to One (1937)
- Death in the Air (1937)
- Turn Off the Moon (1937)
- Religious Racketeers (1938)

== Bibliography ==
- Michael R. Pitts. Poverty Row Studios, 1929–1940: An Illustrated History of 55 Independent Film Companies, with a Filmography for Each. McFarland & Company, 2005.
