= Sherlock Holmes (1932 film) =

1932 film

- Directed by: William K. Howard
- Written by: Bertram Millhauser
- Based on: Sherlock Holmes by William Gillette
- Produced by: William K. Howard
- Starring: Clive Brook; Reginald Owen; Miriam Jordan; Ernest Torrence
- Cinematography: George Barnes
- Music by: Hugo Friedhofer
- Production company: Fox Film Corporation
- Distributed by: Fox Film Corporation
- Release date: November 6, 1932
- Running time: 68 minutes
- Country: United States
- Language: English

Sherlock Holmes (a.k.a. Conan Doyle's Master Detective Sherlock Holmes) is a 1932 American pre-Code film starring Clive Brook as the eponymous London detective. The movie is based on the successful stage play Sherlock Holmes by William Gillette, in turn based on the stories by Arthur Conan Doyle, and was directed by William K. Howard for the Fox Film Corporation. Brook had played Holmes previously in The Return of Sherlock Holmes and the "Murder Will Out" segment of Paramount on Parade.

Reginald Owen plays Dr. Watson, and Ernest Torrence is Holmes's arch-rival, Professor Moriarty. Reginald Owen played Sherlock Holmes the following year in A Study in Scarlet. Owen is one of a small number of actors to play both Holmes and Watson. Examples of other such actors include Jeremy Brett, who played Watson on stage in the United States and, most famously, Holmes on British television, Carleton Hobbs, who played both roles in British radio adaptations, and Patrick Macnee, who played both roles in US television movies.

== Cast ==
- Clive Brook as Sherlock Holmes
- Miriam Jordan as Alice Faulkner
- Ernest Torrence as Moriarty
- Herbert Mundin as George
- Reginald Owen as Dr. Watson
- Howard Leeds as Little Billy
- Alan Mowbray as Colonel Gore-King
- C. Montague Shaw as Judge
- Frank Atkinson as Man in Bar
- Ivan F. Simpson as Faulkner
- Stanley Fields asTony Ardetti

Uncredited:

- Ted Billings as Carnival Thug
- Roy D'Arcy as Manuel Lopez
- Edward Dillon as Al
- John George as Bird Shop Thug
- Robert Graves as Gaston Roux
- Lew Hicks as Prison Guard
- Brandon Hurst as Secretary to Erskine
- Claude King as Sir Albert Hastings
- Arnold Lucy as Chaplain
- Lucien Prival as Hans Dreiaugen
