= A Million to One (film) =

1937 film

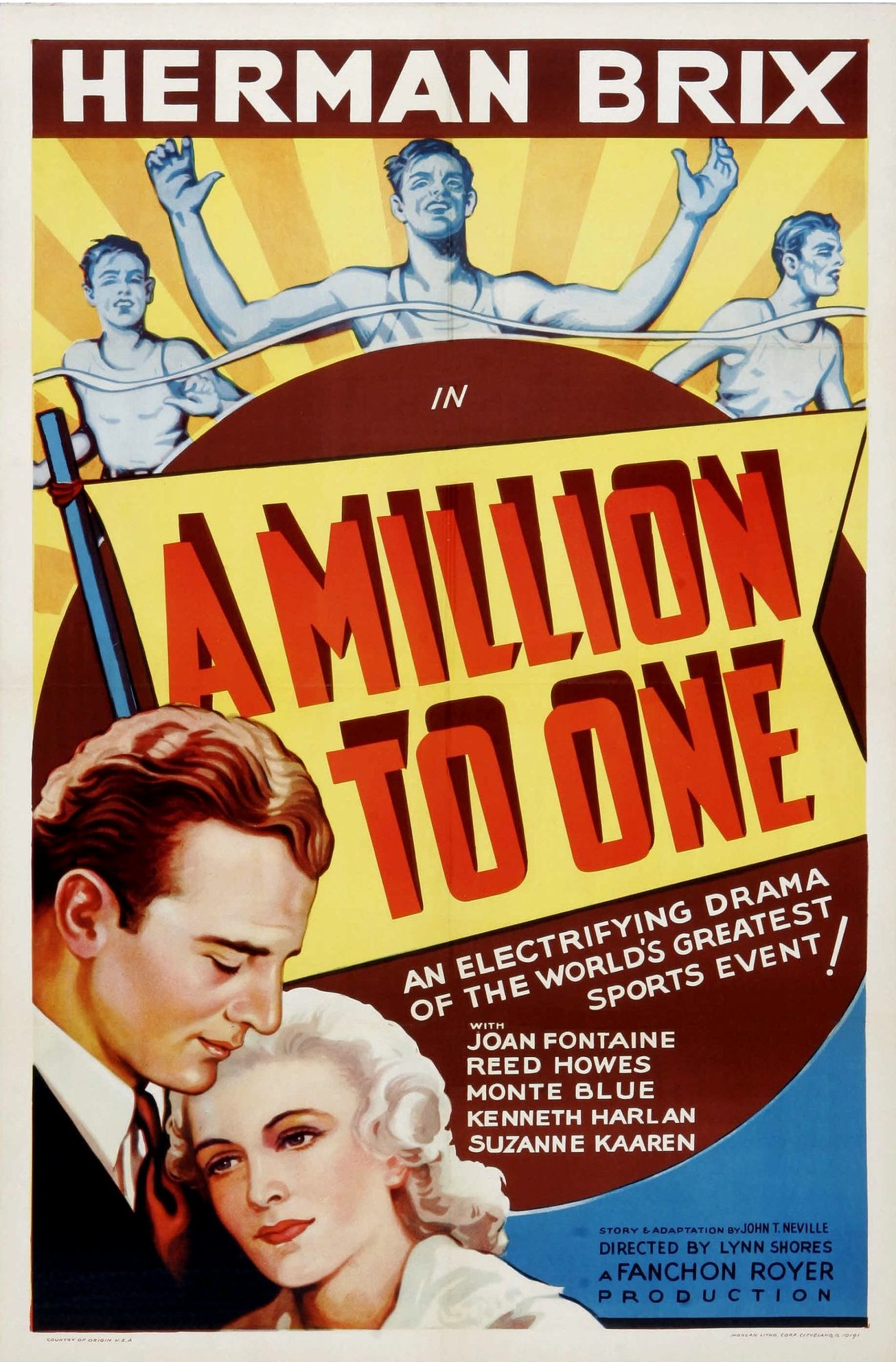
- Theatrical release poster
- Directed by: Lynn Shores
- Screenplay by: John T. Neville
- Story by: John T. Neville
- Produced by: Fanchon Royer
- Starring: Bruce Bennett; Joan Fontaine; Reed Howes; Monte Blue; Kenneth Harlan; Suzanne Kaaren
- Cinematography: James Diamond
- Edited by: Edward Schroeder
- Production company: Fanchon Royer Pictures
- Distributed by: Puritan Pictures
- Release date: March 3, 1937
- Running time: 68 minutes
- Country: United States
- Language: English

A Million to One is a 1937 American drama film directed by Lynn Shores and written by John T. Neville. The film stars Bruce Bennett, Joan Fontaine, Reed Howes, Monte Blue, Kenneth Harlan and Suzanne Kaaren. The film was released on March 3, 1937, by Puritan Pictures.

Bennett is billed as Herman Brix, which was his given name and the one he used as an athlete while competing in football and the 1928 Summer Olympics.

== Plot ==
After his father wins the Olympic decathlon but is disqualified for being judged a paid professional athlete rather than an amateur, Johnny Kent becomes a rising star in the athletic world himself.

William Stevens, the runner-up who received the gold medal after John Kent was stripped of it, has a daughter, Joan, who begins seeing young Johnny socially while he trains. The distraction she causes, combined with a rivalry with Duke Hale in competition both in sports and for the girl, complicates matters as Johnny's quest continues.

== Cast ==
- Bruce Bennett as Johnny Kent
- Joan Fontaine as Joan Stevens
- Reed Howes as Duke Hale
- Monte Blue as John Kent, Sr.
- Kenneth Harlan as William Stevens
- Suzanne Kaaren as Pat Stanley
- Joey O'Brien as Johnny Kent, as a young boy
- Joy Healy as Joan Stevens, as a young girl
- Ben Hall as Joe
- Edward Peil, Sr. as Mac
- Dick Simmons as Friend

== See also ==
- List of films about the sport of athletics
