= Loco Boy Makes Good =

1942 American short film by Jules White

- Directed by: Jules White
- Written by: Felix Adler; Clyde Bruckman
- Produced by: Jules White
- Starring: Moe Howard; Larry Fine; Curly Howard; Vernon Dent; John Tyrrell; Dorothy Appleby; Symona Boniface; Bud Jamison; Eddie Laughton; Heinie Conklin
- Cinematography: John Stumar
- Edited by: Jerome Thoms
- Distributed by: Columbia Pictures
- Release date: January 8, 1942 (U.S.)
- Running time: 17:28
- Country: United States
- Language: English

Loco Boy Makes Good is a 1942 short subject directed by Jules White starring American slapstick comedy team The Three Stooges (Moe Howard, Larry Fine and Curly Howard). It is the 60th entry in the series released by Columbia Pictures starring the comedians, who released 190 shorts for the studio between 1934 and 1959.

== Plot ==
The Stooges get thrown out (literally) of a motel by their irascible landlord for having insignificant arrears in rent. Desperate to pay their rent, the Stooges contrive to get easy money by having Curly slip on a bar of soap in a hotel lobby so they can sue and win a large settlement. However, they abandon their scheme when they discover that Mrs. Brown, the hotel's elderly proprietor, is being threatened with the loss of her establishment by the impatient holder of the mortgage. Confronted with the plight of Mrs. Brown, the trio resolve to help her by undertaking the restoration of the dilapidated hotel.

After many mishaps while renovating the place, the Stooges orchestrate a grand reopening ceremony, wherein they endeavor to showcase the rejuvenated establishment to critical acclaim. The boys put on a show with the famous critic Waldo Twitchell in attendance. Their act goes over poorly until Curly accidentally puts on a magician's coat from which concealed animals unexpectedly emerge, captivating the audience and ensuring the triumph of their enterprise.

== Cast ==
=== Credited ===
- Moe Howard as Moe/Moe Jr.
- Larry Fine as Larry/Larry Jr.
- Curly Howard as Curly
- John Tyrrell as Waldo Twitchell
- Dorothy Appleby as Twitchell's Girl

=== Uncredited ===
- Frances Raymond as Mrs. Brown
- Symona Boniface as Nightclub Patron with Mouse Down Dress
- Bud Jamison as Happy Haven Hotel Manager
- Eddie Laughton as Drunk Customer
- Vernon Dent as Balbo the Magician
- Al Thompson as Dancing Partner with glasses
- Victor Travers as Bald Nightclub patron
- Heinie Conklin as Nightclub patron
- James Millican as Nightclub patron
- Lynton Brent as Nightclub patron with beard and glasses
- Duke York as Night patron

== Production notes ==
Filming for Loco Boy Makes Good took place from July 29 to August 1, 1941. However, it did not appear in theatres until January 1942, the first Stooges short to be released after the attack on Pearl Harbor.

Loco Boy Makes Good is filled with parodies and timely references. The title itself parodies the expression "Local Boy Makes Good," a generic small-town newspaper headline about a local citizen who has achieved a major accomplishment. Loco is Spanish for "crazy." In addition, the character name "Waldo Twitchell" is pun of the name Walter Winchell.

The Stooges' act is billed as "Nill, Null & Void: Three Hams Who Lay Their Own Eggs, appearing in the Kokonuts Grove." The "Kokonuts Grove" is a reference to the Cocoanut Grove (Ambassador Hotel) in Los Angeles.

== Controversy ==
In March 1946, silent film actor Harold Lloyd sued Columbia Pictures for $500,000 ($9,852,342 today), claiming they violated copyright laws. The court discovered that the script for Lloyd's 1932 film Movie Crazy, directed by Clyde Bruckman (with Lloyd stepping in due to Bruckman's alcoholism), was nearly identical to Bruckman's script for Loco Boy Makes Good, released four years earlier. Columbia lost the lawsuit. Later, Universal Pictures faced similar lawsuits for using Bruckman's scripts, resulting in millions of dollars in damages.

== Quotes ==
- Curly: (storming to the dressing room) "How do ya like that?! Hittin' me with a tomato! And Major Bowes said I had talent!"
- Balbo: (chuckles) "A tomato, 'uh?"
- Curly: "Yeah, a cowardly tomato, one that hits you and runs!"
- Patron: "Excuse me, waiter, do you have pâté de fois gras?"
- Larry: (confused) "...I'll see if the band can play it."
- Moe: "Start slipping, we start suing."
- Moe: "Who is he? Why he's one of the biggest steelmen in the country! He'd steal any...I mean, his steel is known from coast to coast. Willie Steal."
