= His Ex Marks the Spot =

- Directed by: Jules White
- Written by: Felix Adler
- Produced by: Jules White
- Starring: Buster Keaton; Dorothy Appleby; Elsie Ames; Matt McHugh
- Cinematography: Benjamin Kline
- Edited by: Mel Thorsen
- Production company: Columbia Pictures
- Distributed by: Columbia Pictures
- Release date: December 13, 1940
- Running time: 18 minute
- Country: United States
- Language: English

His Ex Marks the Spot (1940) is the seventh short subject starring Buster Keaton made for Columbia Pictures.

== Plot ==
Buster is married to his second wife Dorothy Appleby where he must pay his first wife Elsie Ames alimony leading to current financial stress. To save the alimony payment, Buster invites his first wife and new boyfriend (Matt McHugh) to live with his current wife. As you can imagine, there is a lot of comedic conflict. To get the couple out and not have to pay alimony, a shotgun wedding ensues.

== Cast ==
- Buster Keaton as the husband
- Dorothy Appleby as the second wife
- Elsie Ames as the first wife
- Matt McHugh as Radcliffe, the boyfriend

== See also ==
- Buster Keaton filmography
