= The Mysterious Rider (1933 film) =

1933 film by Fred Allen

- Directed by: Fred Allen
- Screenplay by: Harvey Gates; Robert N. Lee
- Produced by: Harold Hurley
- Starring: Kent Taylor; Lona Andre; Berton Churchill; Irving Pichel; Warren Hymer; Gail Patrick; Cora Sue Collins
- Cinematography: Archie Stout
- Music by: John Leipold
- Production company: Paramount Pictures
- Distributed by: Paramount Pictures
- Release date: January 20, 1933
- Running time: 57 minutes
- Country: United States
- Language: English

The Mysterious Rider is a 1933 American pre-Code Western film directed by Fred Allen and written by Harvey Gates and Robert N. Lee. The film stars Kent Taylor, Lona Andre, Berton Churchill, Irving Pichel, Warren Hymer, Gail Patrick and Cora Sue Collins. The film was released on January 20, 1933, by Paramount Pictures.

== Cast ==
- Kent Taylor as Wade Benton
- Lona Andre as Dorothy
- Berton Churchill as Mark King
- Irving Pichel as Cliff Harkness
- Warren Hymer as 'Jitney' Smith
- Gail Patrick as Mary Benton Foster
- Cora Sue Collins as 'Jo-Jo' Foster
- E. H. Calvert as Sheriff Matt Arnold
- Sherwood Bailey as Matt Arnold Jr.
- Clarence Wilson as Hezekiah Gentry
- Niles Welch as John Foster
