= I Loved You Wednesday =

1933 film

- Directed by: Henry King; William Cameron Menzies
- Screenplay by: Philip Klein; Horace Jackson
- Based on: I Loved You Wednesday by Molly Ricardel and William DuBois
- Produced by: Henry King
- Starring: Warner Baxter; Elissa Landi; Victor Jory; Miriam Jordan
- Cinematography: Hal Mohr
- Edited by: Frank E. Hull
- Music by: Louis De Francesco
- Production company: Fox Film Corporation
- Distributed by: Fox Film Corporation
- Release date: June 16, 1933
- Running time: 80 minutes
- Country: United States
- Language: English

I Loved You Wednesday is a 1933 American pre-Code comedy drama film directed by Henry King and William Cameron Menzies and written by Philip Klein and Horace Jackson, adapted from the 1932 play of the same title by Molly Ricardel and William DuBois. The film stars Warner Baxter, Elissa Landi, Victor Jory, Miriam Jordan, Laura Hope Crews, and June Lang. The film was released on June 16, 1933, by Fox Film Corporation.

== Plot ==
Vicki Meredith, a ballet student in Paris, meets and falls for fellow American and aspiring architect Randall Williams. Some time into their relationship she discovers he already has a wife back home. Angered by this she abandons Paris and heads for South America where she meets engineer Philip Fletcher, and falls in love before he then leaves to work on the Boulder Dam. In America she encounters Philip again as well as Randall and his wife.

== Cast ==
- Warner Baxter as Philip Fletcher
- Elissa Landi as Vicki Meredith
- Victor Jory as Randall Williams
- Miriam Jordan as Cynthia Williams
- Laura Hope Crews as Doc Mary Hanson
- June Lang as Ballet Dancer
- Anne Nagel as Ruby - the Hat Check Girl
- Chris-Pin Martin as Chris - the Waiter
- Gino Corrado as Opera Singing Neighbor
- Ethan Laidlaw as Signalman
- Mischa Auer as Piano Accompanist
- Alphonse Martell as Bickering Frenchman
- Charles R. Moore as Elevator Operator
- Bull Montana as Doorman at Speakeasy
