= Skybound (film) =

1935 film

- Directed by: Raymond K. Johnson
- Written by: George Jeske; Charles E. Roberts
- Produced by: C.C. Burr
- Starring: Lloyd Hughes; Edward J. Nugent; Lona Andre
- Cinematography: Irvin Akers
- Edited by: Tony Martinelli
- Music by: Lee Zahler
- Production company: C.C. Burr Productions
- Distributed by: Puritan Pictures
- Release date: September 23, 1935
- Running time: 55 minutes
- Country: United States
- Language: English

Skybound is a 1935 American action film directed by Raymond K. Johnson and starring Lloyd Hughes, Edward J. Nugent and Lona Andre. It was produced as an independent second feature on Poverty Row and distributed by Puritan Pictures. The film's sets were designed by the art director Vin Taylor.

== Plot ==
A gang of smugglers hoping to outwit Captain John Kent, a pilot with United States Border Patrol, use an attractive nightclub singer to try and trick his younger brother Doug into assisting them.

== Cast ==
- Lloyd Hughes as Capt. John Kent
- Edward J. Nugent as Doug Kent
- Lona Andre as Teddy Blaine
- Grant Withers as Chet Morley
- Claire Rochelle as Marion Kent
- John Cowell as Clyde Faber
- Harry Harvey as George Duncan
- Sam Lufkin as William Saunders
- Loren Rowell as Maj. Duncan
- Mabel Mason as Cafe Cashier
- Jack Gardner as Patrol Flyer
- Robert Dillon as Patrol Flyer
- Jack Cheatham as Joe - Patrol Flyer
- John Fox Stone as Patrol Flyer
- Jerry Rousseau as Patrol Flyer
- Dick Curtis as Master of Ceremonies
- Ralph Dawson as Plainclothesman
- Doris Karns as Cigarette Girl
- Herb Vigran as Grant - Mechanic

== Bibliography ==
- Pitts, Michael R. Poverty Row Studios, 1929–1940. McFarland & Company, 2005.
