= Nothing But Pleasure =

- Directed by: Jules White
- Written by: Clyde Bruckman
- Produced by: Jules White
- Starring: Buster Keaton; Dorothy Appleby; Beatrice Blinn; Robert Sterling; Vernon Dent
- Cinematography: Henry Freulich
- Distributed by: Columbia Pictures
- Release date: January 19, 1940
- Running time: 20 mins.
- Country: United States
- Language: English

Nothing But Pleasure is the third short subject American comedian Buster Keaton made for Columbia Pictures. Keaton made a total of ten films for the studio between 1939 and 1941.

== Plot ==
Clarence Plunkett and his wife drive to Detroit to buy a new car. To save money on the shipping fee, they decide to drive it back home.

== Cast ==
- Buster Keaton as Clarence Plunkett
- Dorothy Appleby as Clarence's wife

== Production ==
This short was later remade as an episode of The Abbott and Costello Show.
