= The Invader (1935 film) =

- Directed by: Adrian Brunel
- Written by: Edwin Greenfield
- Produced by: Harold Richman; Sam Spiegel
- Starring: Buster Keaton; Lupita Tovar; Lyn Harding; Esme Percy
- Cinematography: Eugen Schüfftan
- Edited by: Daniel Birt
- Music by: John Greenwood
- Production companies: British & Continental
- Distributed by: MGM (England); J. H. Hoffberg (United States)
- Release date: 1935
- Running time: 61 minutes
- Country: United Kingdom
- Language: English

The Invader is a 1935 British comedy film directed by Adrian Brunel and starring Buster Keaton, Lupita Tovar, and Lyn Harding. The film was later remade by Keaton as a short subject, Pest from the West (1939), with a millionaire setting out to win a local girl in Mexico.

== Production ==
Keaton was then recovering from severe bouts of alcoholism, which had contributed to his former studio Metro-Goldwyn-Mayer discharging him in 1933. Despite the efforts of director Adrian Brunel, Keaton managed to sneak a few drinks during production. Buster Keaton was noticeably impaired in some scenes but delivered a professional performance.

Produced at Isleworth Studios by British & Continental, The Invader was released by MGM in England to meet the annual quota set by the British government—but MGM declined to release the picture in the United States. Keaton, having left the studio under a cloud two years before, was no longer being promoted by MGM as one of its players.

Instead, the American rights to the film were secured by J. H. Hoffberg, a New York-based importer of European films who acquired the film in October 1935. This was the most important feature Hoffberg had handled, with a major star name to exploit, and the usually economical Hoffberg produced elaborate, full-color posters and accessories to promote the film, which he retitled An Old Spanish Custom.

Hoffberg wanted to replace the stately Latin overture of the British release with more upbeat swing music, but the closest he could manage was a commercial phonograph record of a current pop song, "It's an Old Southern Custom", performed by Victor Young and his orchestra. Current video versions of An Old Spanish Custom restore the Latin theme from the original British release.

== Release and reception ==
At the time this British feature was being prepared for American release, Buster Keaton was making short comedies for Educational Pictures, but had not been seen in American feature films for two years. Hoffberg offered An Old Spanish Custom at much lower rates than Keaton's MGM features had commanded, which attracted attention from independent distributors in America. They in turn offered the film to neighborhood theaters in their regional territories, assuring national exposure. An Old Spanish Custom was playing as a second feature in major theaters, beginning in December 1935.

Trade reviewers called it typical for Keaton. "This will do in undiscriminating nabes (neighborhood theaters) as feature support," reported The Exhibitor. "Comedy lies in Keaton's attempts to acclimate self to Old Spain—dancing, serenading, dueling—in simple awkward style. Film Daily noted: "Despite poor performances by the principal players, with the exception of Buster Keaton, and a creaky story, this British production provides some laughs and is okay for the pop houses. Photography okay. Direction so-so."

== Later revivals ==
Because An Old Spanish Custom was not handled by a major studio, the film went out of circulation after its initial runs. Only a few 16mm nontheatrical prints were held by local film libraries for rental use. It soon became one of the rarest Buster Keaton titles. The film was revived only occasionally on television in the 1950s, and in 1968 WIBF-TV in Philadelphia showed the film in prime time as part of its "The Best of the Worst" series.

An Old Spanish Custom even returned to New York theaters: once on May 5, 1972, as part of the Thalia Theater's "Cinema Cavalcade" of obscure 1930s titles, and once in 1991 at the Film Forum, as presented personally by historian William K. Everson.

A VHS videotape version was released in 1990, and a DVD version followed in 2005.

== Cast ==
- Buster Keaton as Leander Proudfoot
- Lupita Tovar as Lupita Melez
- Lyn Harding as Gonzalo Gonzalez
- Esmé Percy as Jose
- Andreas Malandrinos as Carlos, bartender
- Clifford Heatherley as Cheeseman, butler
- Hilda Moreno as Carmita
- Webster Booth as Cantina Singer
