= Pardon My Berth Marks =

- Directed by: Jules White
- Written by: Clyde Bruckman
- Produced by: Jules White
- Starring: Buster Keaton; Dorothy Appleby; Vernon Dent; Richard Fiske; Ned Glass; John Tyrrell; Bud Jamison; Jack Lipson
- Cinematography: Benjamin H. Kline
- Distributed by: Columbia Pictures
- Release date: March 22, 1940
- Country: United States
- Language: English

Pardon My Berth Marks is the fourth short subject starring American comedian Buster Keaton made for Columbia Pictures. Keaton made a total of ten films for the studio between 1939 and 1941.

== Plot ==
Elmer is a budding newspaper reporter who boards a train and innocently becomes involved with a mobster's wife.

Elmer is the all-purpose errand boy in a busy newsroom,and not very good at his job;to the frustration of boss Venon Dent. Buster answers the boss' phone when a gangster calls to complain about an expose' the

paper ran. Elmer tells him he doesn't have the nerve to show up.So the gangster comes over and beats up the bewildered editor/.

When a tip comes in t hat a famous actress is taking a train to Reno,Nevada to obtain a divorce,nobody is left to cover the story except Elmer. At the train station,Buster destroys the woman's luggage before realizing who she is. She feels comfortable with ANY man around, because the man she is divorcing is the same gangster who beat up the Editor.The gangster is flying to Reno to meet the train at the end of the line.

Elmer has gotten a "Just Married" sign attatched to his backside, and now everybody assumes he and Mary are man and wife.This is "confirmed" when Elmer is spotted entering Mary's berth late at night. Elmer is actually trying to capture a runaway parrot--who keeps squawking "I Love You" loud enough for the whole train to hear.

An enormous crowd is waiting at the Reno train station to welcome the "newlyweds". ELmer manages to knock out the gangster. Looking for something to tie him up with, he yanks the emergency cord;sending everyone on the train into a flying finale'.

== Cast ==
- Buster Keaton as Elmer
- Dorothy Appleby as Mary Chrismas

== Production ==
Columbia remade this film in 1947 (with Harry Von Zell) as Rolling Down to Reno.
