= She's Oil Mine =

- Directed by: Jules White
- Written by: Clyde Bruckman; Felix Adler
- Produced by: Jules White
- Starring: Buster Keaton; Monte Collins; Eddie Laughton; Elsie Ames; Harry Semels; Bud Jamison
- Cinematography: Benjamin H. Kline
- Edited by: Jerome Thoms
- Distributed by: Columbia Pictures
- Release date: November 20, 1941
- Running time: 17 mins.
- Country: United States
- Language: English

She's Oil Mine is the last short subject American comedian Buster Keaton made for Columbia Pictures. Keaton made a total of 10 films for the studio from 1939 to 1941.

== Plot ==
Waters and Piper are plumbers. During a busy day in their shop, an heiress flees from a persistent suitor. The jealous suitor challenges Keaton to a duel.

The duel takes place on the heiress’s property, where oil drilling is underway. During the confrontation, an oil well is accidentally struck and begins to gush. The resulting oil discovery makes the heiress wealthy, resolves the dispute, and ends the suitor’s pursuit.

== Cast ==
- Buster Keaton as Waters
- Monte Collins as Piper
- Elsie Ames as the heiress
- Eddie Laughton as the suitor

== Background ==
The film is a reworking of Keaton's 1932 feature The Passionate Plumber. The duel was also reworked in Keaton's 1947 French short Un Duel A Mort.

After making 10 shorts for Columbia, Keaton chose not to renew his contract and opted for supporting roles in feature films. Columbia continued to offer the Keaton comedies to theaters well into the 1960s.
