= Dangerously Yours (1933 film) =

1933 film

- Directed by: Frank Tuttle
- Written by: Horace Jackson
- Starring: Warner Baxter; Miriam Jordan; Herbert Mundin
- Cinematography: John F. Seitz
- Edited by: Harold D. Schuster
- Production company: Fox Film Corporation
- Distributed by: Fox Film Corporation
- Release date: February 24, 1933
- Running time: 74 minutes
- Country: United States
- Language: English

Dangerously Yours is a 1933 American Pre-Code comedy film directed by Frank Tuttle, starring Warner Baxter, Miriam Jordan and Herbert Mundin.

== Cast ==
- Warner Baxter as Andrew Burke
- Miriam Jordan as Claire Roberts
- Herbert Mundin as Grove
- Florence Eldridge as Jo Horton
- Florence Roberts as Mrs. Lathem
- William B. Davidson as George Carr
- Arthur Hoyt as Dr. Ryder
- Mischa Auer as Kassim
- Nella Walker as Lady Gregory
- Edmund Burns as Tony
- Robert Greig as White
- Tyrell Davis as Theodore Brill

== Bibliography ==
- Aubrey Solomon. The Fox Film Corporation, 1915–1935: A History and Filmography. McFarland, 2011.
