= The Cameraman =

1928 film directed by Edward Sedgwick

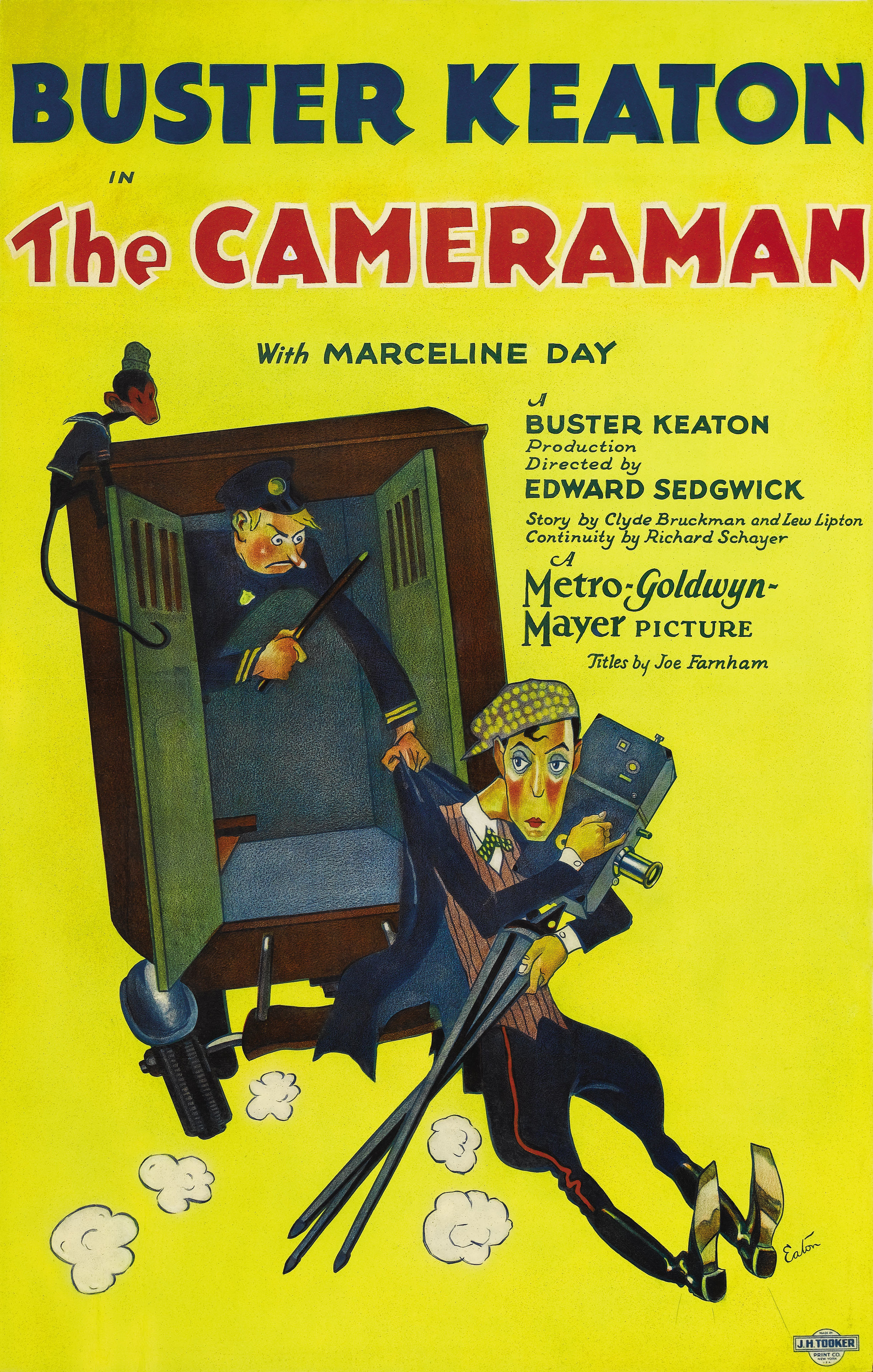
- Theatrical poster
- Directed by: Edward Sedgwick; Buster Keaton
- Written by: Story: Clyde Bruckman; Lew Lipton; Titles: Joseph W. Farnham
- Produced by: Buster Keaton; Lawrence Weingarten (uncredited)
- Starring: Buster Keaton; Marceline Day
- Cinematography: Reggie Lanning; Elgin Lessley
- Edited by: Hugh Wynn
- Music by: Mitja Reichenberg
- Distributed by: Metro-Goldwyn-Mayer
- Release date: September 22, 1928
- Running time: 70 minutes (8 reels)
- Country: United States
- Languages: Silent film English intertitles

The Cameraman is a 1928 American silent romantic comedy film directed by Edward Sedgwick and an uncredited Buster Keaton. The picture stars Keaton and Marceline Day.

It was Keaton's first film under contract to Metro-Goldwyn-Mayer. The following year, however, MGM refused to let Keaton continue with creative control over his pictures, causing lasting damage to his career from which Keaton never really recovered. Keaton later referred to his move to MGM as "the worst mistake of my career."

The film is considered by fans and critics to be one of Keaton's best, and was selected for preservation in the National Film Registry in 2005, being deemed "culturally, historically, or aesthetically significant." The Cameraman entered the public domain in the United States on January 1, 2024.

== Plot ==
Full film

Buster, a sidewalk tintype portrait photographer in New York City, develops a crush on Sally, a secretary who works for MGM Newsreels. To be near her, he purchases an old film camera, emptying his bank account, and attempts to get a job as one of MGM's cameramen. Harold, an MGM cameraman who has designs on Sally himself, mocks his ambition.

Sally, however, encourages Buster and suggests he film anything and everything. Buster's first attempts show his total lack of experience. He double exposes or over exposes much of the footage, and the rest is simply no good. Despite this setback, Sally agrees to go out with Buster, after her Sunday date cancels. They go to the city plunge (pool), where Buster gets involved in numerous mishaps. Later, Harold offers Sally a ride home, while Buster has to sit in the rumble seat, where he gets drenched in the rain.

The next day, Sally gives him a hot tip she has just received that something big is going to happen in Chinatown. In his rush to get there, he accidentally runs into an organ grinder, who falls and apparently kills his monkey. A nearby cop makes Buster pay for the monkey and take its body with him. The monkey turns out only to be dazed and joins Buster on his venture.

In Chinatown, Buster films the outbreak of a Tong War, narrowly escaping death on several occasions. At the end, he is rescued from Tong members by the timely arrival of the police, led by a cop who had been the unintentional victim of several of Buster's antics over the last few days. The cop tries to have him committed to the mental hospital, but Buster makes his escape with his camera intact.

Returning to MGM, Buster and the newsreel company's boss are dismayed to find that he apparently forgot to load film into his camera. When Sally finds herself in trouble for giving Buster the tip, Buster offers to make amends by leaving MGM alone once and for all.

Buster returns to his old job, but does not give up on filming, setting up to record a boat race. He then discovers that he has Tong footage after all; the mischievous monkey had switched the film reels. Sally and Harold are speeding along in one of the boats. When Harold makes too sharp a turn, the two are thrown into the river. Harold saves himself, but Sally is trapped by the circling boat. Buster stops filming to jump in and rescues her. When Buster rushes to a drug store to get medical supplies to revive her, Harold returns and takes credit for the rescue. The two go off, leaving the brokenhearted Buster behind, while the monkey films it all on the camera.

Buster decides to send his Tong footage to MGM free of charge. The boss decides to screen it for Harold and Sally for laughs, but is thrilled by what he sees. They also see footage of Buster's boat footage and the monkey's shot of Buster's rescue of Sally. The boss calls it the best camerawork he has seen in years. The boss sends Sally to get Buster, who tells him that he's in for a great reception. Buster assumes a ticker-tape parade is in his honor, whereas it is really for Charles Lindbergh.

== Cast ==
- Buster Keaton as Buster
- Marceline Day as Sally Richards
- Harold Goodwin as Harold Stagg
- Sidney Bracey as Edward Blake, the boss
- Harry Gribbon as Hennessey, the cop

=== Uncredited cast ===
- Richard Alexander as one of Buster's rivals, the 'big sea lion'
- Edward Brophy as the man in the bath-house, who insists on sharing Buster's tiny changing room
- Ray Cooke as an office worker
- Vernon Dent as the man in tight bathing suit
- William Irving as a photographer
- Charles Lindbergh as himself (archive footage)
- Bert Moorhouse as Randall
- Harry Keaton as the man in the swimming pool
- Louise Keaton as the woman in the swimming pool
- Josephine the Monkey as the monkey

== Production ==
On January 26, 1928, Keaton signed a two-year deal with Metro-Goldwyn-Mayer. The deal required 2 films per year from Keaton and paid him $3,000 a week, making him the third highest-paid actor at the studio. Keaton brought most of his own crew with him from his own independent production company. He immediately pitched the idea for The Cameraman to MGM, who paid him $1,250 for it. Keaton later said that the MGM deal was "the worst mistake of my life."

The film was overseen by producer Lawrence Weingarten. Weingarten and Keaton fought on set and Weingarten called Keaton a child. Keaton was accustomed to complete control over his own productions and was unaccustomed to interference from producers. However, MGM's head of production Irving Thalberg loved the finished film and laughed during screenings of its rushes (a rare display of emotion from Thalberg). 22 writers were assigned to work on it, but Keaton convinced Thalberg to throw out the script and allow him to film it his own way.

The Cameraman would later serve as inspiration for part of the 1950 comedy Watch the Birdie, starring Red Skelton, with Keaton working as a gagman for MGM and serving as an advisor to Skelton. The dressing-room scene in which Buster and another bather attempt to change while being pressed up against each other and getting entangled in one another's clothes was the inspiration for the stateroom scene in the Marx Brothers 1935 film A Night at the Opera.

== Critical reception ==
The film was a box office hit, grossing $797,000, and was well received by film critics. MGM writing department used the film to train new writers as a "perfectly constructed comedy" for decades, even wearing out their print.

Critic Mordaunt Hall, writing for The New York Times, liked the film and the work of Buster Keaton. He said, "Mr. Keaton's latest effort is The Cameraman, which is filled with guffaws and grins, the sort of thing with many original and adroitly worked-out gags. But whether they belong to the story is immaterial...There are other sections that are wild and watery, but nonetheless humorous."

David Robinson wrote that the film "betrays nothing of the struggle and strain that went into its preparation. It is a lucid, beautifully formed dramatic comedy."

On Rotten Tomatoes, the film holds an approval rating of 100%, based on 20 reviews.

== Honors ==
In 2005, the film was selected for preservation in the United States National Film Registry by the Library of Congress as being "culturally, historically, or aesthetically significant."

== Preservation status ==
The Cameraman was at one point considered a lost film, destroyed in the 1965 MGM vault fire. However, a near-complete print was discovered in Paris in 1968. Another print, of much higher quality, although missing some footage, was discovered in 1991. The two prints were combined into a version which is now available; only three minutes of footage are known to remain lost. The Cameraman was released on Blu-ray and DVD through The Criterion Collection (under license from Warner Bros.) on June 16, 2020. As a film published in 1928, it entered the public domain on January 1, 2024.

== See also ==
- Buster Keaton filmography

== Bibliography ==
- The Cameraman essay by Daniel Eagan in American's Film Legacy: The Authoritative Guide to the Landmark Movies in the National Film Registry, A&C Black, 2010 ISBN 0826429777, pages 144-145.
- Meade, Marion (1997). Buster Keaton: Cut to the Chase. New York, NY: Da Capo Press. ISBN 0306808021.
- Wakeman, John (1987). World Film Directors. Vol. 1. New York, New York: The H. W. Wilson Company. ISBN 9780824207571.
