= Del Lord =

Canadian film director (1894–1970)

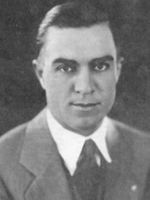
- Born: Delmer Lord; October 7, 1894; Grimsby, Ontario, Canada
- Died: March 23, 1970 (aged 75); Calabasas, California, United States
- Occupations: Film director, actor

Delmer "Del" Lord (October 7, 1894 – March 23, 1970) was a Canadian film director and actor best known as a director of Three Stooges films.

== Career ==
Delmer Lord was born in the small town of Grimsby, Ontario, Canada. Interested in the theatre, he traveled to New York City, then when fellow Canadian Mack Sennett offered him a job at his new Keystone Studios, Lord went on to work in Hollywood, California. There he played the driver of the Keystone Cops police van, appearing in many of the Cops' successful films.

Given a chance to direct, Del Lord became a specialist in automotive gags, rigging cars to explode, crash, fall apart, or dangle in precarious positions. Lord was responsible for a number of very successful comedies for Keystone and directed two feature films for Universal Pictures. However, the Great Depression plagued the film industry with budget cuts, and Sennett was forced to close his studio in 1933. Hal Roach launched a brief series of slapstick comedies with "The Taxi Boys" (Clyde Cook, Billy Gilbert, Billy Bevan, and other expressive comedians), and these films required outlandish visual gags and a fleet of crazy cars. Del Lord was the ideal man to direct, and he worked on these comedies exclusively for a year. After leaving Roach, Lord joined producer Phil Ryan's short-comedy unit at Paramount Pictures. During the summer of 1934, Lord took a job selling used cars at a relative's automobile agency. Producer Jules White, shopping for a Buick, encountered Lord at the agency and hired him to work at Columbia Pictures.

From 1935 to 1945, Lord directed some of Columbia's fastest and funniest two-reelers and is credited with developing the unique comic style of the Three Stooges. In addition to directing and/or co-producing more than three dozen Stooge shorts, he directed two of Buster Keaton's "comeback" shorts for Columbia, Pest from the West (1939) and So You Won't Squawk? (1940).

== Feature films ==
In 1936, a Canadian law required that American studios would have to release a certain quota of Canadian-made films in order to distribute their own Hollywood productions in Canada. Columbia, anxious to exert some control over the quality of the films, sent some of its actors and crew members to Canada, including its Canadian-born employees. Del Lord made one feature film there, What Price Vengeance (1937).

Facing a manpower shortage owing to wartime conditions, Columbia promoted Del Lord to feature films in 1944. Most of Lord's Columbia features are action melodramas rather than slapstick comedies; he may have gotten these assignments based on his handling of his one previous Columbia feature, What Price Vengeance. However, he did direct some "B" comedies during this period, the most prominent being Kansas City Kitty (1944) starring Joan Davis.

In 1945, Monogram Pictures announced that Del Lord would produce and direct its feature-length musical Swing Parade of 1946, which would feature the Three Stooges. Lord was forced to withdraw from the project when "conflicting commitments" interfered; Columbia had scheduled him to direct the Judy Canova comedy Singin' in the Corn (1946). Monogram reassigned him to a Bowery Boys comedy, In Fast Company (1946).

== Later career ==
In 1946, comedy star Hugh Herbert, then working in Columbia's short comedies, clashed with director Edward Bernds and refused to work with Bernds any longer. Producer Hugh McCollum asked Del Lord to return temporarily to the studio's short-subjects department, where he directed eight comedies with Herbert and one with the Stooges.

In 1952, Del Lord directed Buster Keaton in an industrial featurette, A Paradise for Buster. Lord can be seen in an episode of TV's This Is Your Life, honoring Lord's old boss Mack Sennett.

== Death ==
Del Lord died on March 23, 1970, in Calabasas, California, and is interred in the Olivewood Memorial Park, in Riverside, California.

== In popular culture ==
Two rock bands took their names from the Stooges' frequently credited director: the Del-Lourds of New Jersey (1963), an opening act for Jackie Wilson; and The Del-Lords of New York City (1983–90 and 2010–13).

== Selected filmography ==
- Lizzies of the Field (1924)
- Topsy and Eva (1927)
- Lost at the Front (1927)
- Barnum Was Right (1929)
- The Loud Mouth (1932)
- Oh, My Nerves (1935)
- The Three Stooges shorts (1935–1948, more than three dozen films)
- Trapped by Television (1936)
- What Price Vengeance (1937, released in the United Kingdom as Vengeance)
- Buster Keaton shorts: Pest from the West (1939) and So You Won't Squawk? (1940)
- Kansas City Kitty (1944)
- Let's Go Steady (1945)
- I Love a Bandleader (1945)
- Rough, Tough and Ready (1945)
- Singin' in the Corn (1946)
- In Fast Company (1946)
- It's Great to Be Young (1946)

== See also ==
- Canadian pioneers in early Hollywood
