= The Passionate Plumber =

1932 film directed by Edward Sedgwick

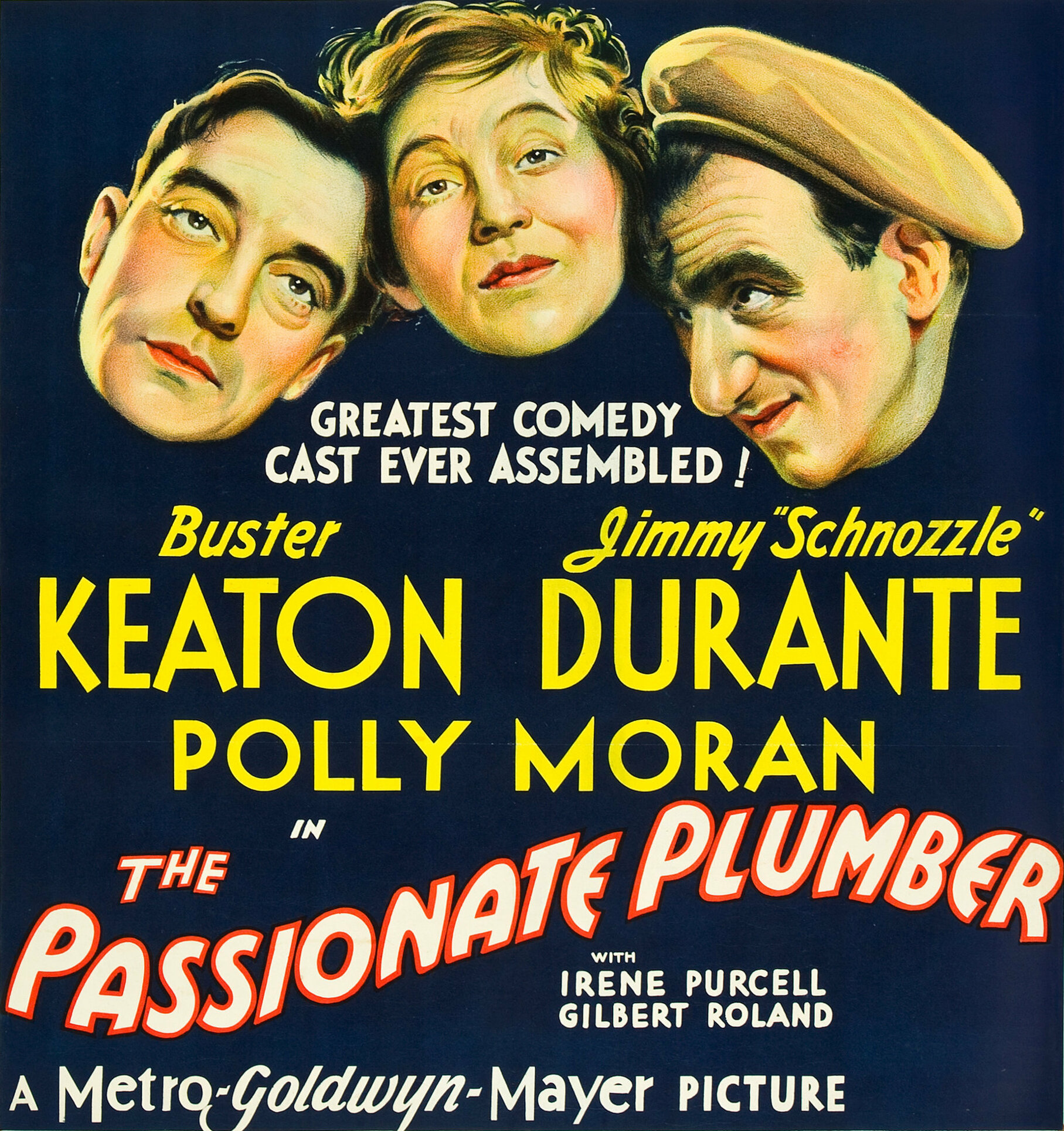
- 1932 window card
- Directed by: Edward Sedgwick
- Written by: Laurence E. Johnson; Ralph Spence
- Based on: Dans sa cadeur naïve 1926 play by Jacques Deval; Her Cardboard Lover 1927 play by Valerie Wyngate P. G. Wodehouse
- Produced by: Harry Rapf
- Starring: Buster Keaton; Jimmy Durante; Irene Purcell
- Cinematography: Norbert Brodine
- Edited by: William S. Gray
- Music by: Franz Waxman
- Production company: Metro-Goldwyn-Mayer
- Distributed by: Metro-Goldwyn-Mayer
- Release date: February 6, 1932
- Running time: 73 minutes
- Country: United States
- Language: English

The Passionate Plumber is a 1932 American pre-Code comedy film directed by Edward Sedgwick, and starring Buster Keaton, Jimmy Durante, and Irene Purcell. The screenplay by Laurence E. Johnson and Ralph Spence is based on the 1926 play Dans sa candeur naïve by Jacques Deval. It is the second screen adaptation of the play, following the 1928 silent film The Cardboard Lover. It later was remade in 1942 as Her Cardboard Lover.

A French-language version was made at the same time, under the title, Le plombier amoureux. The dueling sequence was reworked in two of Keaton's later short subjects, She's Oil Mine from 1941 and the 1947 Un Duel A Mort made in France.

Gilbert Roland did not appear in the credits for the American release.

== Plot ==
Paris plumber Elmer Tuttle is enlisted by socialite Patricia Alden to help make her lover Tony Lagorce jealous. With the help of his friend Julius J. McCracken, and through the high society contacts he has made through Patricia, Elmer hopes to find financing for his latest invention, a pistol with a target-illuminating light. Comic complications ensue when Elmer's effort to interest a military leader is misconstrued as an assassination attempt.

== Cast ==
- Buster Keaton as Elmer E. Tuttle
- Jimmy Durante as Julius J. McCracken
- Irene Purcell as Patricia Alden
- Polly Moran as Albine
- Gilbert Roland as Tony Lagorce
- Mona Maris as Nina Estrada
- Maude Eburne as Aunt Charlotte
- Henry Armetta as Bouncer
- Paul Porcasi as Paul Le Maire
- Jean Del Val as Chauffeur
- August Tollaire as General Bouschay
- Edward Brophy as Pedestrian

== Critical reception ==
In a less than flattering review, Variety observed: "There is some comedy of merit in this flimsy scenario, stretched from a natural two-reel length to fill a full-length spool, and it isn't necessary to gaze beyond the cast to find the source. But the cast and the laughs are constantly obliged to fight the plot and motives; unfortunately, the plot wins the battle, contrary to the picture's best interests. ... While Durante and Keaton are cross-firing for laughs, the rest is momentarily laid aside, and when the chief laugh grabbers return to the theme, they don't mix. Polly Moran hasn't much to do, which is the picture's biggest disappointment." The New York Times gave a positive review.
