= Clyde Bruckman =

American film writer and director (1894–1955)

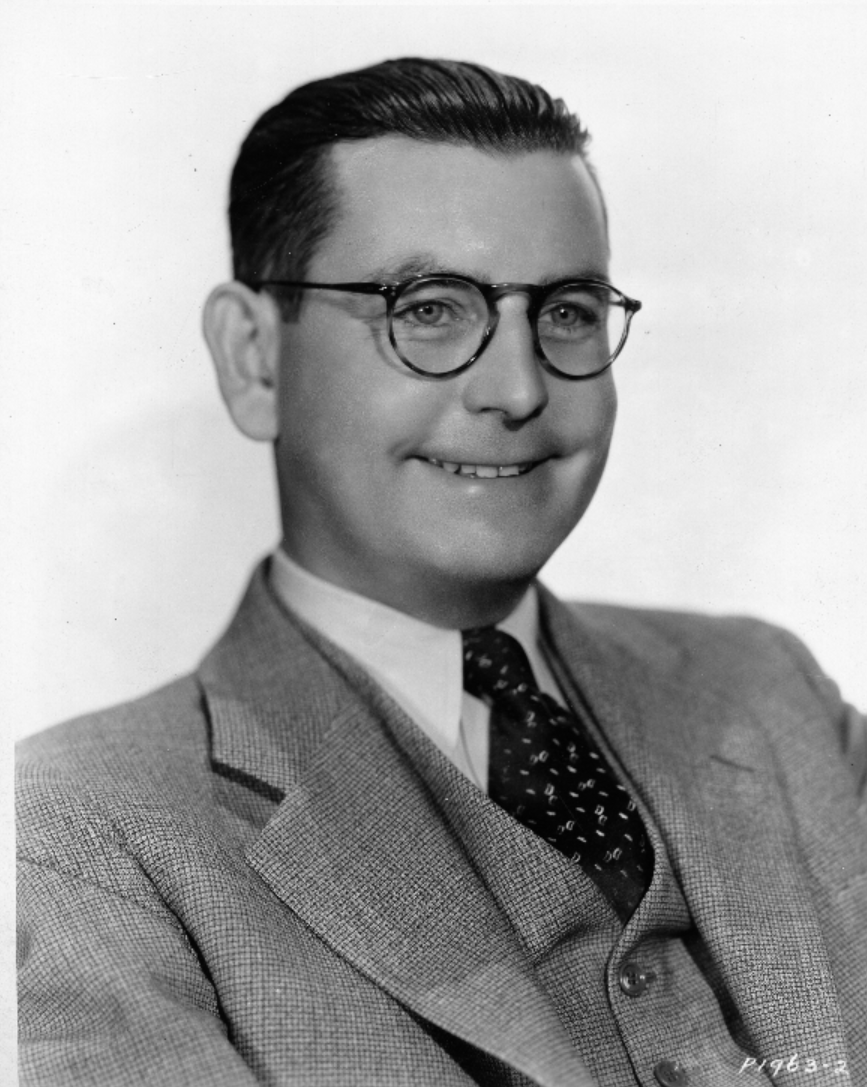
- Bruckman in 1935
- Born: Clyde Adolf Bruckman; June 30, 1894; San Bernardino, California, US
- Died: January 4, 1955 (aged 60); Santa Monica, California, US
- Occupations: Comedy writer, director
- Spouse(s): Lola Margaret Bruckman (1916–1931; her death); Gladys Bruckman (m. 1932)

Clyde Adolf Bruckman (June 30, 1894 – January 4, 1955) was an American writer and director of comedy films during the late silent era, who continued working into the 1950s. Bruckman collaborated with such comedians as Buster Keaton, Monty Banks, W. C. Fields, Laurel and Hardy, The Three Stooges, Abbott and Costello, and Harold Lloyd.

Hollywood chronicler Kenneth Anger considers Bruckman to have been one of the key figures in the history of American screen comedy.

== Early life ==
Clyde Adolf Bruckman (pronounced "BROOK-mun") was born on June 30, 1894, in San Bernardino, California. In 1911, Bruckman's father Rudolph was in a car accident that left him with headaches and brain damage. Rudolph shot himself in 1912.

Bruckman began writing for the sports pages of the San Bernardino Sun in the spring of 1912. In 1914, he moved to Los Angeles and got a job as a sportswriter for the Los Angeles Times. He later worked for the Los Angeles Examiner and the Saturday Evening Post.

On July 29, 1916, Bruckman married Lola Margaret Hamblin.

== Career ==
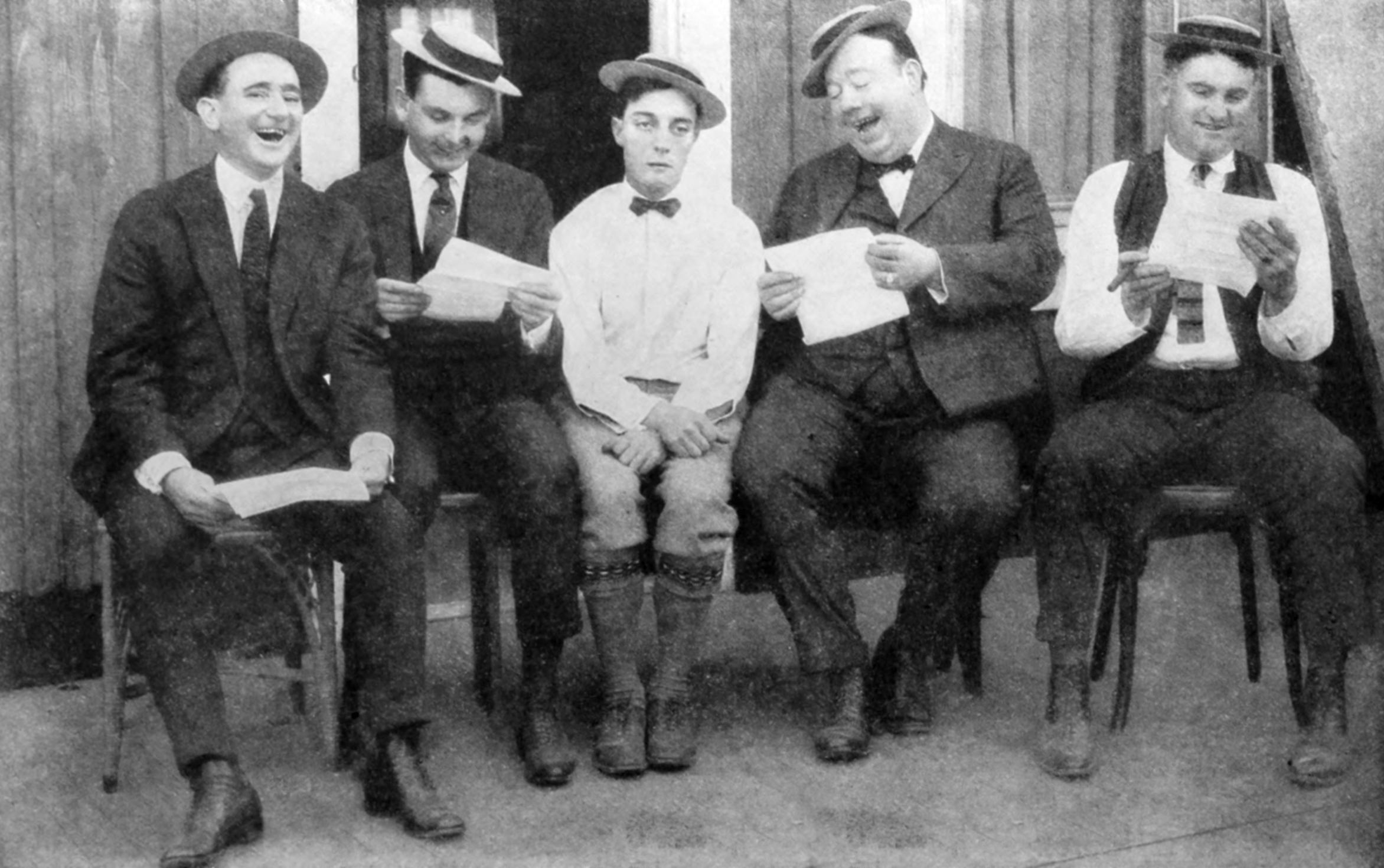
Joe Mitchell, Clyde Bruckman, Buster Keaton, Jean Havez and Eddie Cline (1923)

Bruckman first worked in film in 1919, writing intertitles for Universal Pictures. In 1921, he moved to Warner Bros. and then joined Metro Pictures as a gag writer for Buster Keaton.

Bruckman may be best known for his collaborations with Keaton, as Bruckman co-wrote several of Keaton's most popular feature films, including Our Hospitality, Sherlock Jr., The Navigator, Seven Chances, The General (which Bruckman also co-directed), and The Cameraman.

Clyde Bruckman directed four Laurel and Hardy comedies in the early stages of their established partnership at the Hal Roach Studios in 1927–1928, most notably The Battle of the Century with its celebrated pie fight. During this period he also wrote for and directed the thrill-comedians Harold Lloyd and Monty Banks.

Bruckman continued directing comedies during the sound era, his most famous credit being The Fatal Glass of Beer, W. C. Fields' esoteric satire of Yukon melodramas. Unfortunately for his career path, Bruckman's fondness for alcohol caused production delays that cost him directorial assignments. From 1935 forward, Bruckman would be limited to writing scripts.

== Recycling gags ==
Clyde Bruckman's wealth of silent-comedy experience earned him a steady position in Columbia Pictures' short-subject department (Bruckman was instrumental in Columbia's hiring his old boss Keaton in 1939). Bruckman continued to write new material for The Three Stooges and other comics, but as time went by, Bruckman's work ethic became lazier and he resorted to borrowing gags from Lloyd's and Keaton's silent films. After Bruckman lifted the magician's-coat sequence from Lloyd's Movie Crazy for The Three Stooges' Loco Boy Makes Good, and the "loosely basted tuxedo" routine from Lloyd's The Freshman for the Stooges' Three Smart Saps, Lloyd sued Columbia and won. "Never mind that Bruckman had co-written and co-directed Movie Crazy, giving him a pretty strong claim to intellectual ownership of the routine, or that Bruckman and Lloyd may very well have borrowed their ideas from a vaudeville act in the first place", wrote Ethan Gates in The New Republic, reviewing Matthew Dessem's 2015 biography of Bruckman, The Gag Man. Incidentally, Bruckman was not involved with The Freshman in any capacity, and he had no major involvement with Movie Crazy beyond a director credit and a few scenes, as Lloyd had to step in to direct the film due to Bruckman's alcohol abuse.

One example of Bruckman's constant recycling is a routine involving the comedian thinking he is boxed in while trying to leave a parallel parking space. The routine was used at least four times by Bruckman: with Lloyd Hamilton in Too Many Highballs (1933); W. C. Fields in Man on the Flying Trapeze (1935); Buster Keaton in Nothing But Pleasure (1940); and Abbott and Costello in a TV episode called Car Trouble (1954).

Bruckman was hired by Universal Pictures to write comedy scenes for the studio's "B" musical features. This was a lucrative assignment that paid better than short subjects. He continued recycling gags but on a larger scale, now lifting entire sequences from older films. He inserted the tuxedo routine into Universal's "B" musical-comedy feature Her Lucky Night. Bruckman adapted material from Lloyd's Welcome Danger into Universal's Joan Davis–Leon Errol comedy She Gets Her Man, and again consulted Movie Crazy for Universal's "B" comedy So's Your Uncle. Lloyd, outraged by three "wholesale infringements" within months, filed suit for US$1,700,000; the court ruled in Lloyd's favor but reduced the damages to $40,000. Universal fired Bruckman, and he never worked on a feature film again. Demoralized, he returned to the Columbia short-subject department. His work was now so slipshod that, according to writer-director Edward Bernds, Bruckman would simply hand in an old feature-film script without any attempt to update or revise it. "Bruckman's scripts were very sloppy. I would frequently have to revise his work, as there were so many unconnected pieces. Some of his scripts were totally incomprehensible."

== Television ==
The advent of television, and its constant need for broadcast material, gave Bruckman a new start. In 1949 he reunited with Buster Keaton for a new series of half-hour TV comedies. Abbott and Costello launched a filmed television series in 1951 and, having used up most of their own familiar routines during the show's first season, hired Clyde Bruckman, whose mental storehouse of gags saw them through a second season. Although Bruckman received credit for several scripts, these turned out to contain reworkings of old Keaton and Lloyd gags. Again, Lloyd filed suit, naming Abbott and Costello's production company as a party to the suit. As a result, other producers were unwilling to hire Bruckman.

Bruckman's only safe haven was Columbia, but producer Jules White had already filled his quota of scripts for that season and turned Bruckman away, having no immediate need for his services.

== Suicide ==
With nowhere else to turn, the desolate Bruckman borrowed a .45-caliber pistol from Keaton, claiming to need it for a hunting trip. On the afternoon of January 4, 1955, Bruckman, a resident of Santa Monica, California, parked his car outside a local restaurant, entered a restroom, and shot himself in the head. He left a typed note requesting that his wife be notified and his body be donated for medical or experimental purposes, stating that "I have no money to pay for a funeral."

Some reports claim the location was Santa Monica Boulevard in Hollywood or inside a phone booth, but according to his January 5 obituary, it was in the city of Santa Monica, and Bruckman left a typewritten note for the "gentlemen of the Santa Monica Police Department." Neither Buster Keaton nor Jules White had any inkling of Bruckman's intentions.

== Personal life ==
Bruckman married first wife Lola in 1916. She died after complications from emergency surgery on October 8, 1931. He was married to his second wife, Gladys, from March 1932 until his death. They had no children.

== Cultural references ==
The X-Files Season 3 episode "Clyde Bruckman's Final Repose" features a character, played by Peter Boyle, who foresees how other people die. Two detective characters on that episode are named Havez and Cline, after Jean Havez and Eddie Cline, two other writers who also worked with Keaton. A murder victim in that episode is named Claude Dukenfield, which was the real middle and last name of W. C. Fields, who collaborated with Bruckman on several films. As with his real-life namesake, Boyle's Bruckman character kills himself.
