= Culture of the Southern United States =

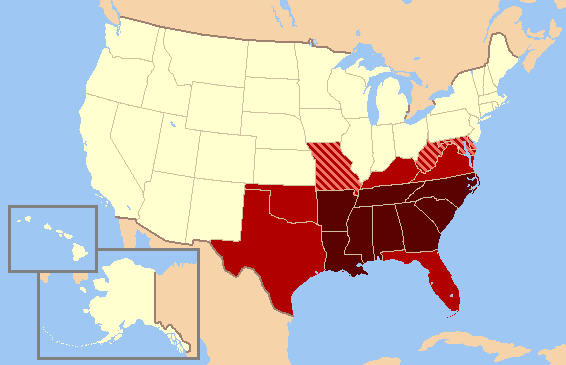
The states in dark red are usually included in modern-day definitions of the South, while those in the color red are often included. The striped states are sometimes considered Southern.

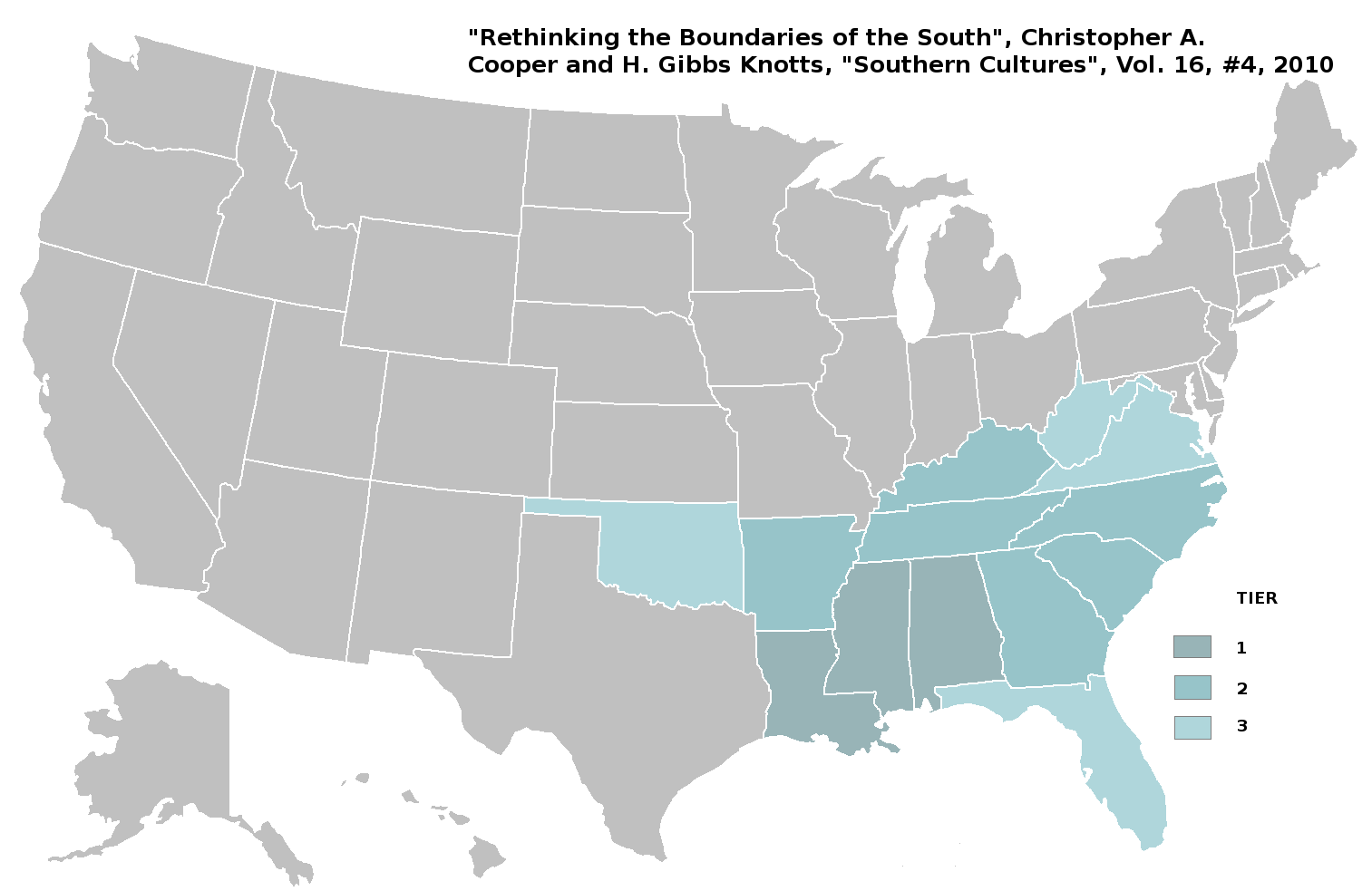
2010 study of southern identity

The culture of the Southern United States, Southern culture, or Southern heritage, is a subculture of the United States. From its many cultural influences, the South developed its own customs, dialects, arts, literature, cuisine, dance, and music. The combination of its history and the fact that many Southerners maintain—and even nurture—an identity separate from the rest of the country have made it one of the most studied and written-about regions of the United States.

From the 17th century until the mid-19th century, the central role of agriculture and slavery during the colonial period and antebellum era economies stratified society by land ownership. This landed gentry differentiated culture in the early Southern United States from areas north of the Mason–Dixon line and west of the Appalachians. The upland areas of the South were characterized by yeoman farmers who worked on their small landed property with few or no enslaved people, while the lower-lying elevations and Deep South were societies of more plantations worked by African slave labor. Events such as the First Great Awakening (1730s–1750s) would strengthen Protestantism in the South and United States as a whole. Communities often developed strong attachment to their churches as the primary community institution.

== History ==
Starting in the early 1600s and lasting to the mid-1800s, slavery played an outsized role in shaping the culture, politics, and economy of the South. This included its agricultural practices, the outbreak of the American Civil War, and the imposition of racial segregation. Southern yeoman farmers, subsistence farmers who owned few or no enslaved people, comprised a large portion of the population during the colonial period and antebellum era, which settled largely in the back country and uplands. Their way of life and culture differed sharply from that of the planter class. The climate of the region is conducive to growing tobacco, cotton, and other crops, and the red clay in many areas was used for the distinctive red-brick architecture of many commercial buildings.

Southern culture was also shaped by the region's landscape and by the presence and practices of Native Americans. Events such as the First Great Awakening (1730s–1750s) boosted Protestantism in the South and United States as a whole. For a century and a half, the Southern United States was heavily rural; World War II launched urbanization that would lead to social and economic transformation of the South.

Excerpt of Letter from Thomas Jefferson to Chastellux, with Enclosure, 2 September 1785
Thomas Jefferson to Chastellux, 2 September 1785

I had even ascribed this to it’s cause, to that warmth of their climate which unnerves and unmans both body and mind. While on this subject I will give you my idea of the characters of the several states. In the North they are cool, sober, laborious, persevering, independent; jealous of their own liberties, and just to those of others; interested, chicaning, superstitious and hypocritical in their religion. In the South they are fiery, voluptuary, indolent, unsteady, independent; zealous for their own liberties, but trampling on those of others; generous, candid, without attachment or pretensions to any religion but that of the heart.

These characteristics grow weaker and weaker by gradation from North to South and South to North, insomuch that an observing traveller, without the aid of the quadrant may always know his latitude by the character of the people among whom he finds himself. It is in Pennsylvania that the two characters seem to meet and blend and to form a people free from the extremes both of vice and virtue. Peculiar circumstances have given to New York the character which climate would have given had she been placed on the South instead of the North side of Pennsylvania. Perhaps too other circumstances may have occasioned in Virginia a transplantation of a particular vice foreign to it’s climate. You could judge of this with more impartiality than I could, and the probability is that your estimate of them is the most just. I think it for their good that the vices of their character should be pointed out to them that they may amend them; for a malady of either body or mind once known is half cured.

Thomas Jefferson

== People ==
=== Anglo-Americans ===
In the time of their arrival, the predominant cultural influence on the Southern states was that of the English colonists who established the original English colonies in the region. In the 17th century, most were of South West England and South East England origins, from regions such as Kent, Sussex and the West Country who settled mostly on the coastal regions of the South but pushed as far inland as the Appalachian mountains by the 18th century. In the 18th century, large groups of Scots lowlanders, Northern English and Ulster-Scots (later called the Scots-Irish) (whose ancestors were Protestants from the Scottish lowlands and Northern England) settled in Appalachia and the Piedmont. Following them were larger numbers of English indentured servants from across the English Midlands and Southern England; they would be the largest group to settle in the Southern Colonies during the colonial period. They were often called "crackers", a derogatory epithet applied to rural, non-elite whites of south Georgia and north Florida. Before the American Revolution, the term was applied by the English, as a derogatory epithet for the non-elite settlers of the southern backcountry. This usage can be found in a passage from a letter to the Earl of Dartmouth, "I should explain ... what is meant by Crackers; a name they have got from being great boasters; they are a lawless set of rascals on the frontiers of Virginia, the Carolinas and Georgia, who often change their places of abode."

Most European Southerners today are of partial or majority English and Scots-Irish ancestry. In previous censuses, over a third of Southern responders identified as being of English or partly English ancestry with 19,618,370 self-identifying as "English" on the 1980 census, followed by 12,709,872 identifying as Irish, 11,054,127 as Afro-American, and 10,742,903 as German. It should also be noted that those who did identify themselves of German ancestry were almost exclusively found in the northern border areas of the region which are adjacent to the American Mid-West. Those from the Tidewater area of Virginia and the Tidewater region of North Carolina identified themselves almost exclusively as of English origins, while those from the Piedmont areas were a mixture of English, Scotch-Irish, Scottish and Irish origins. South Georgia has a large Irish presence, the ancestors of whom were largely at one time Roman Catholic; however, many were converted to various Protestant sects due to the lack of a missionary presence of the Catholic Church in the 18th and 19th centuries. The predominance of Irish surnames in South Georgia has been noted by American historians for some time. Meanwhile, a community of Scottish highlanders settled around what is now Fayetteville in North Carolina. Gaelic was spoken in this region into the nineteenth century.

People of many nationalities established communities in the American South. Some examples are the German American population of the Edwards Plateau of Texas and, whose ancestors arrived in the region in the 1840s. German cultural influence continues to be felt in cities like New Braunfels, Texas near Austin and San Antonio. Much of the population of East Texas, Louisiana, coastal Mississippi and Alabama, and Florida traces its primary ancestry to French and/or Spanish colonists of the 18th century. Also important is the French community of New Orleans dating back to the 1880s.

=== African Americans ===
Another primary population group in the South is the African American descendants of enslaved Africans. African Americans comprise the United States' second largest ethnic group and second-largest racial minority, accounting for 14 percent of the total population, according to the 2010 census. In the South, they accounted for nearly 45% of the population from the Antebellum period through the early 20th century.

Despite Jim Crow-era outflow to the North and Midwest—the Great Migration—most of the country's Black population remains concentrated in the southern states from Virginia to Texas. Since the end of formal segregation, Black Americans have been returning to the South in large numbers—the New Great Migration.

=== Hispanics ===
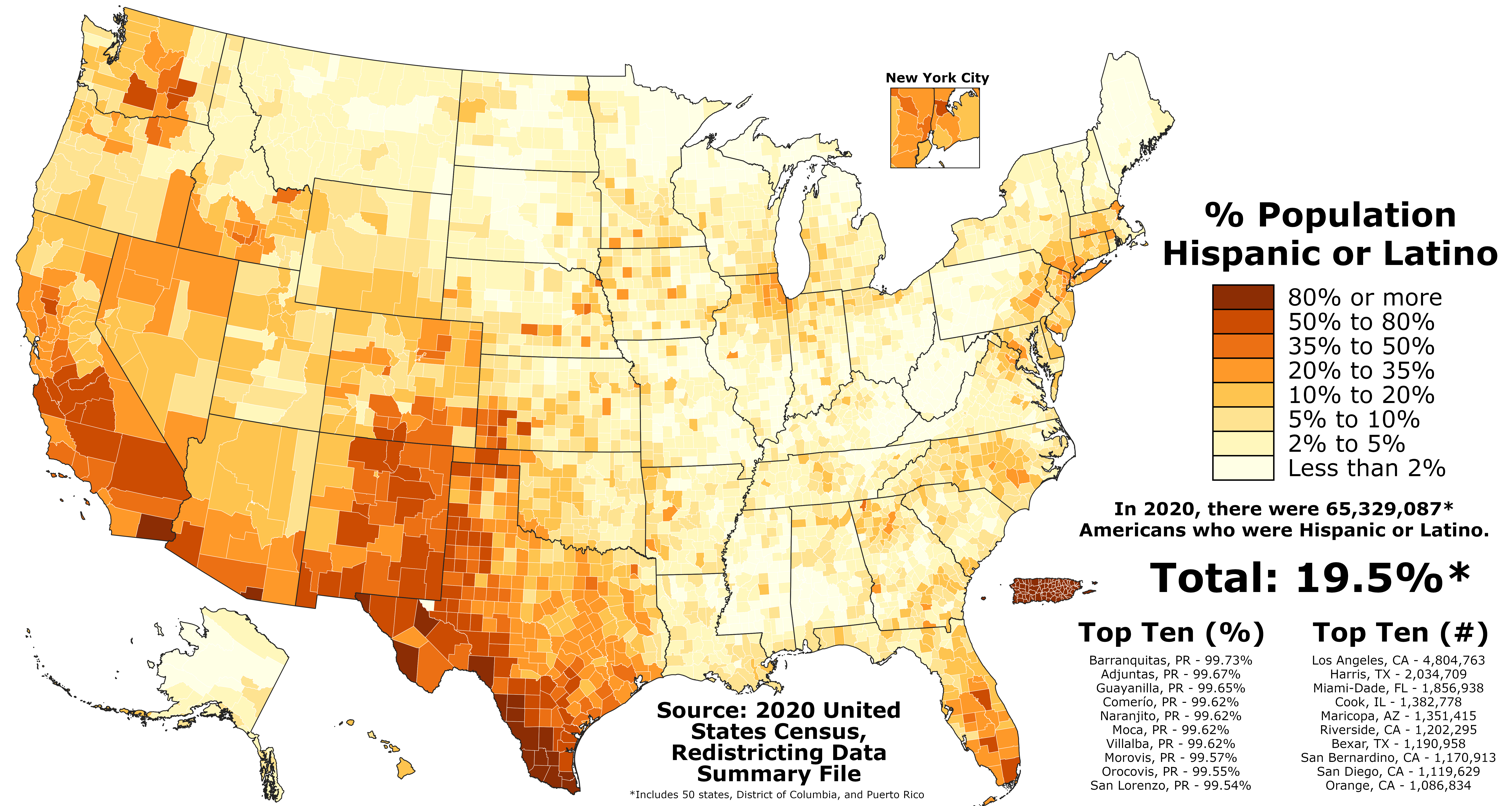
Proportion of Hispanic Americans in each county of the fifty states, the District of Columbia, and Puerto Rico as of the 2020 United States Census

A sizable and growing fraction of the Southern population is Hispanic Americans, especially immigrants from Latin America countries and particularly in Texas and Florida. The Hispanic population of the South has expanded considerably in recent years, due both to natural population growth and immigration over the past half-century. Urban areas such as Atlanta, New Orleans, Charlotte, and Nashville have seen a major increase in Latino immigrants since the 1990s. Factory and agribusiness jobs have also attracted Mexican and Latin American workers to more rural regions of the South.

== Religion ==
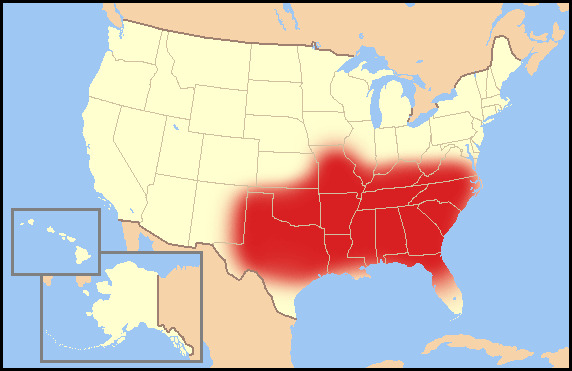
The area roughly considered to constitute the "Bible Belt"

Part of the South is known as the "Bible Belt", because of the prevalence there of evangelical Protestantism. South Florida has a large Jewish element that migrated from New York. Immigrants from Southeast Asia and South Asia have brought Buddhism and Hinduism to the region as well. In the colonial period and early 19th century the First Great Awakening and the Second Great Awakening transformed Southern religion. The evangelical religion was spread by religious revivals led by local lay Baptist ministers or itinerant Methodist ministers. They fashioned the nation's "Bible Belt."

=== Protestantism ===
After the Revolution, the Anglican Church of England was disestablished (meaning it no longer received local tax money) and reorganized as the Protestant Episcopal Church of the USA. The Revolution turned more people toward Methodist and Baptist preachers in the South. The Cane Ridge Revival and subsequent "camp meetings" on the Kentucky and Tennessee frontiers were the impetus behind the Restoration Movement. Traveling preachers used music and song to convert new members. Shape-note singing became a fundamental part of camp meetings in frontier regions. In the early decades of the 18th century, the Baptists in the South reduced their challenge to class and race. Rather than pressing for freedom for slaves, they encouraged planters to improve treatment of them, and ultimately used the Bible to justify slavery.

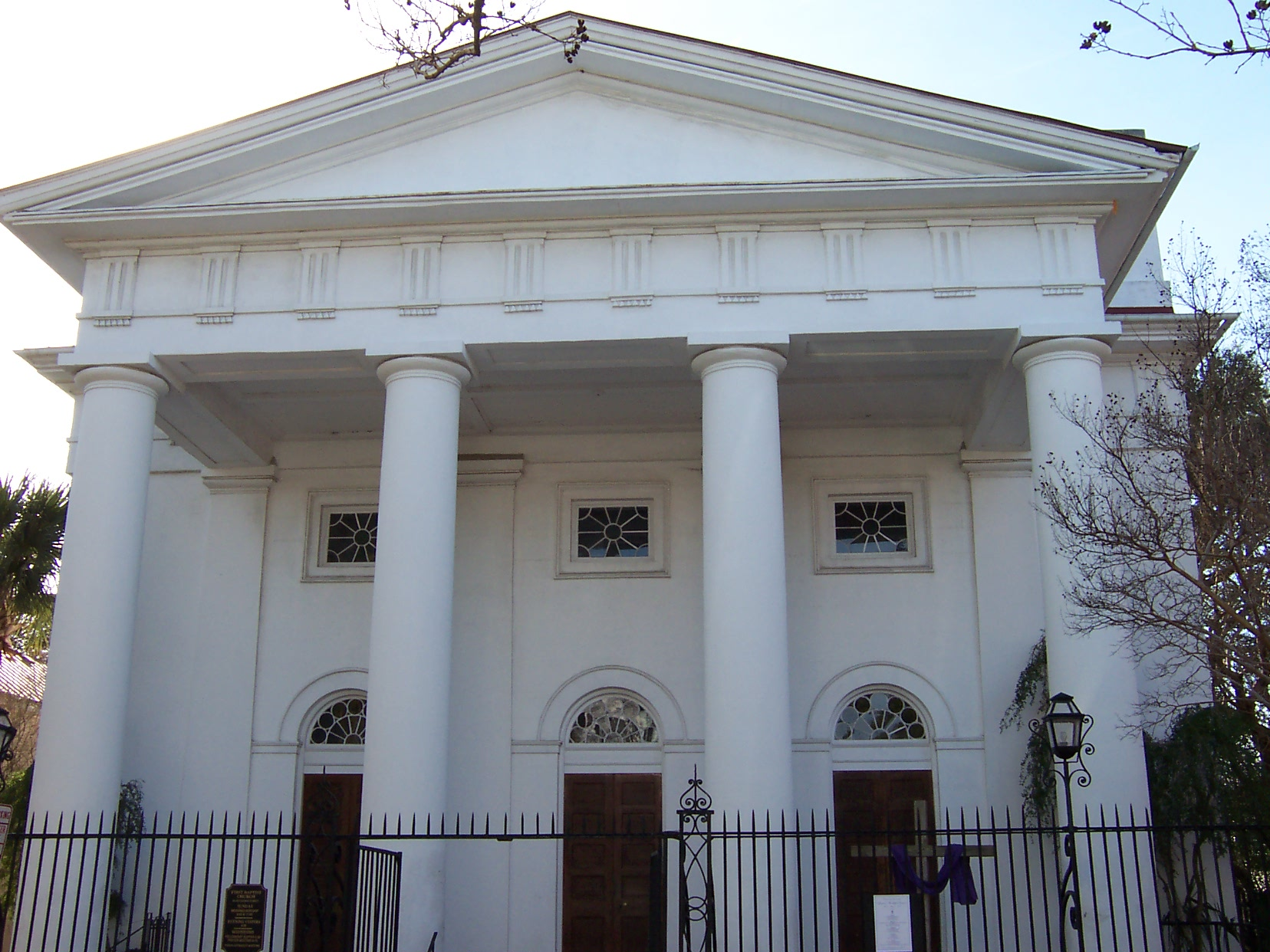
First Baptist Church in Charleston, South Carolina

In 1845, the Southern Baptist Convention separated from other regions. Baptist and Methodist churches proliferated across the Tidewater region, usually attracting common planters, artisans and workers. The wealthiest planters continued to be affiliated with the Episcopal Church. By the beginning of the Civil War, the Baptist and Methodist churches had attracted the most members in the South, and their churches were most numerous in the region.

=== Catholicism ===
Historically Catholic colonists were primarily those from Spain and France who settled in coastal areas of Florida, Alabama, Mississippi, Louisiana and Texas. Today, there are significant Catholic populations along the coast of the Gulf of Mexico (especially the port cities of New Orleans, Biloxi, Pensacola and Mobile), which preserve the continuing Catholic traditions of Carnival at the beginning of Lent in Mardi Gras parades and related customs. Elsewhere in the region, Catholics are typically a minority and of mainly Irish, German and French or modern Hispanic ancestry. As of 2013, Catholics comprised 42% of the population in the New Orleans Metropolitan area based on numbers presented by the Roman Catholic Archdiocese of New Orleans.

Atlanta, in comparison to some other Southern cities, had a relatively small Catholic population prior to the 1990s. Catholics comprised 1.7% of the population in 1960, and 3.1% of the population in 1980. The population has been growing rapidly since then. The number of Catholics grew from 292,300 members in 1998 to 900,000 members in 2010, an increase of 207 percent. The population was expected to top 1 million by 2011. The increase is fueled by Catholics moving to Atlanta from other parts of the U.S. and the world, and from newcomers to the church. About 16 percent of all metropolitan Atlanta residents are Catholic, comparable to many Midwestern metropolitan areas.

Raleigh, North Carolina also has a rapidly growing number of Catholics, with Catholicism having the largest number of affiliates out of any other religious group (11.3%) and the second largest number in Wake County (22%).

Maryland, which was settled by the British, is historically Catholic as well and many historians believe it was named after the Queen Henrietta Maria by Cecilius Calvert, 2nd Baron of Baltimore. Maryland was the only Roman Catholic British colony in the Americas, and was considered a refuge for England's Roman Catholic minority which was being persecuted by the Church of England. When William of Orange rose to power in England, Catholicism was outlawed in Maryland, causing a decrease in the number of practicing Catholics. In the 1840s, the Catholic population rebounded with the mass immigration of Irish due to the Great Famine of Ireland. Maryland also became home to many Polish and Italian immigrants.

In general, the inland regions of the Deep South and Upper South, such as Arkansas, Tennessee, Mississippi, and Alabama were less attractive to immigrants and have stronger concentrations of Baptists, Methodists, Churches of Christ and other Protestant or non-Catholic fellowships. Eastern and northern Texas are heavily Protestant, while the southern and western parts of the state are predominantly Catholic.

=== Black American spirituality ===
Due to the large population of Black Americans in the South, traditional African spiritual customs, particularly those brought by the Bakongo, Bambara, Hausa, Fon, and Ewe peoples, began to influence Christian practices as enslaved Africans converted to Christianity. This led to the normalization of African customs in the Black Church, American Pentecostalism, and the practice of Christianity across the South across racial lines. Studies have found that 20th Century American Christian practices, such as speaking in tongues and catching the holy ghost were directly influenced by traditional African forms of worship. Shoutin', a Christian method of worship is derived from the Ring Shout, a Bakongo religious practice from Angola and the Democratic Republic of the Congo that involved forming a circle, singing, and dancing to connect with the god Nzambi, the goddess Nzambici and the ancestors. These Africanisms became the basis of the Black American spiritual tradition known as Hoodoo. These beliefs were further combined with various other traditional African religions and Catholicism to form the diasporic religion Louisiana Voodoo. The Hausa people's concept of juju and the Bakongo people's concept of mojo became central aspects of both Hoodoo and Louisiana Voodoo.

=== Judaism ===
The city of Charleston, South Carolina, has had a significant Jewish population since the colonial period. The first were Sephardic Jews who had been living in London or on the island of Barbados. They were connected to Jewish communities in New England as well. The community figured prominently in the history of South Carolina. Richmond also had a large Sephardic Jewish community before the Revolution and still has a notable Jewish community today. They built the first synagogue in Virginia about 1791. New Orleans also historically (and in the present day) has a significant Jewish community.

The South Florida area is home to the nation's second largest concentration of Jewish Americans outside New York, most of them early 20th century migrants and descendants from the Northeast. They were descendants of Ashkenazi Jews from Germany, Russia, Poland and other parts of Eastern Europe. Twentieth-century migration and business development have brought significant Jewish and Muslim communities to most major business and university cities, such as Miami, Atlanta, Dallas, Houston, and more recently, Charlotte.

== Language ==
=== Southern dialect ===
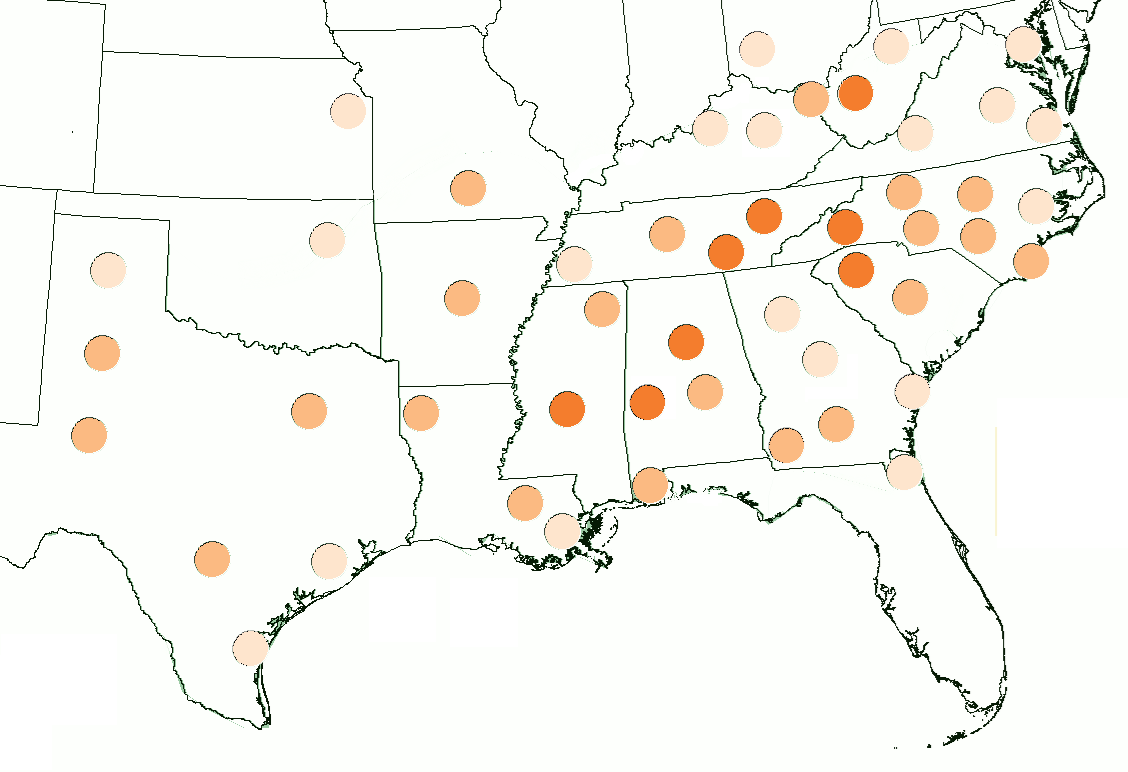
Approximate extent of Southern American English, based on multiple dialect studies

The merger of pin and pen in Southern American English. The areas marked in purple are where the merger is complete for most speakers. Based on Labov, Ash, and Boberg 2006: 68.

Southern American English is a group of dialects of the English language spoken throughout the Southern states of the United States, from West Virginia and Kentucky to the Gulf Coast, and from the mid-Atlantic coast to throughout most of Texas and Oklahoma.

Southern dialects make up the largest accent group in the United States. Southern American English can be divided into different sub-dialects, with speech differing between regions.

It has been said that Southerners are most easily distinguished from other Americans by their speech, both in terms of accent and idiom. However, there is no single "Southern Accent." Rather, Southern American English is a collection of dialects of the English spoken throughout the South. Southern American English can be divided into different sub-dialects, with speech differing between, for example, that of Appalachian region and the coastal "low country" around Charleston, South Carolina. Folklorists in the 1920s and later argued that because of the region's isolation, Appalachian language patterns more closely mirrored Elizabethan English than other accents in the United States.

There are several other unique linguistic enclaves in the American South. Among them is that of Tangier Island, Virginia, as well as the Outer Banks North Carolina, which some scholars claim preserves a unique English dialect from the colonial period. The New Orleans or "Yat" dialect is similar to Northeastern port city accents because of an influx of German and Irish immigrants similar to those of the Northeast. Many are familiar with Louisiana French, historically spoken in the southern half of Louisiana.

African American Vernacular English (AAVE) shares similarities with Southern dialect due to African Americans' strong historical ties to the region.

=== Other languages ===
While traces of African linguistic features remain in AAVE, there are a few distinctively African dialect groups in the South, the Gullah the most famous among them. Gullah is still spoken by some African Americans in the Low Country of South Carolina, Georgia, southeastern North Carolina, and Northeast Florida, particularly the older generation. Also called Geechee in Georgia, the language and a strongly African culture developed because of the people's relative isolation in large communities, and continued importation of slaves from the same parts of Africa. As the enslaved people on large plantations were relatively undisturbed by whites, Gullah developed as a creole language, based on African forms. Similarly the people kept many African forms in religious rituals, foodways and similar transportable culture, all influenced by the new environment in the colonies. Other, less known African American dialect groups are the rural blacks of the Mississippi Basin, and Africatown near Mobile, Alabama, where the last known ship to arrive in the Americas with slaves was abandoned in 1860.

Other distinct languages include Louisiana French (Louisiana) and Isleño Spanish (Louisiana; see also Canarian Spanish).

The US South also contains many indigenous languages from the Native American Muskogean, Caddoan, Siouan–Catawban, Iroquoian, Algonquian, Yuchi, Chitimacha, Natchez, Tunica, Adai, Timucua, and Atakapa families. The historical record seems to suggest a picture of great linguistic diversity (similar to California) although most languages mentioned were not documented. Several southeastern languages have become extinct and all are endangered. The influence of native languages has led to distinct Indian varieties of English.

== Regional variations ==
There continues to be debate about what constitutes the basic elements of Southern culture. This debate is influenced partly because the South is such a large region. As a result, there are a number of cultural variations among states in the region.

Among the variations found in Southern culture are:

- The Deep South was first settled by the English from the Chesapeake colonies of Virginia and Maryland, and later South Carolina. This was the first area that developed plantations for cash crops of tobacco, rice and indigo. Later, cotton, and hemp became important cash crops, as well. Planters would import large numbers of Africans as slave labor. The coastal areas of the Old South were dominated by wealthy planters, who controlled local government.
- The Upland South or "Upper South" have historical, political, and cultural divisions that make it differ from lower-lying elevation areas and the Deep South. For example, the Appalachian and Ozark mountain region landforms differing in settlement from that of low-lying areas such as the Virginia Tidewater, Gulf Coast, South Carolina Lowcountry, and the Mississippi Delta. By contrast, farmers in the Upland South cultivated land for subsistence, and few held slaves. The Upland South's population has mainly Scots-Irish and English ancestry. Because settlers were chiefly yeoman farmers, many upland areas did not support the Confederate cause during the American Civil War (see Andrew Johnson). The Upland South also had many areas that continued to support the Republican Party while the remainder of the white South supported Democrats during the Solid South era.
- Areas having experienced a large influx of newcomers typically have been less likely to hold onto a distinctly Southern identity and cultural influences. Today, partly because of continuing population migration patterns between urban areas in the North and South, historically "Southern" larger urban areas, such as Atlanta, Austin, Charlotte, Dallas, Houston, Raleigh-Durham, Jacksonville, Orlando, and San Antonio have assimilated modern metropolitan identities distinct from their historic "Southern" heritage. However, while these metropolitan areas have had their original southern culture somewhat diluted, they nonetheless have largely preserved their distinct "Southern" identity.

=== Alabama ===
Southern Alabama north of Mobile was settled predominately by large plantation owners and slaves moved west from their original settlements on the coasts of South Carolina and Georgia. These settlers originally had slave plantations in Barbados and sought to expand their plantation based economy. This region is mainly known for its large African American population and historic cultivation of wheat, cotton, and rice. It is the epitome of what is considered the Deep South. Today, this region is the poorest in the state and one of the poorest regions in the country. It still remains mostly rural and has seen minimal development.

Unlike the rest of southern Alabama, which was settled by British plantation owners, Mobile and the Gulf Coast was settled by Spanish and French settlers much earlier than the rest of the state. Mobile likely has more in common with New Orleans than it does with the rest of the state. Today, Mobile still retains some of its French traditions, such as having a large Catholic presence and annual celebrations of Mardi Gras, which first began in the United States in the city.

Northern Alabama was settled by Northern English and Scots Irish settlers who came to the United States. These Appalachian settlers were mostly small farmers—who did not own any slaves and had little voting power due to the rich planters in the South, who controlled the government. Today this region is still mostly rural, but is developing urban areas, such as cities like Birmingham and Huntsville attracting outsiders for work.

Plurality ancestry per US county, 2000: German English Norwegian Finnish Dutch Mexican Spanish Native "American" African American Irish French Italian

=== Kentucky ===
With its northern border at the boundary of the Upper South and the Midwest, Kentucky demonstrates multiple cultural influences. A study in the 1990s revealed that 79% of Kentuckians agreed they were living within the south. The study also showed that 84% of Texans and 82% of Virginians believe they live within the south. It also showed between 80 and 90% of residents in Mississippi, Louisiana, Alabama, Tennessee, Arkansas, Georgia and the Carolinas described themselves as southerners. This is likely because regional identification often varies dramatically within Kentucky. For example, many consider Northern Kentucky to be the most Midwestern region, as it shares culture with Cincinnati. Studies show that a significant minority of people in Northern Kentucky identify with the South. Conversely, southern Ohio and southern Indiana are highly Southern in comparison to most of the Midwest, as is the "Little Egypt" region of southern Illinois.

Some sources treat Southern Indiana as essentially the upper tip of Upland South culture, while others maintain that Southern culture, while significant, is not dominant in the region. Louisville is viewed as culturally and economically Midwestern in some analyses, because of how it rapidly industrialized during the late 19th century (although not to the same extent as most northern cities), as opposed to the slow industrialization that occurred in the South. Other observers consider Louisville to be southern culturally, due to dialect and various other aspects of culture. It is often described as both "the Gateway to the South" and "the northernmost Southern city and southernmost Northern city." Unlike the remainder of the state, Louisville, Covington, and Newport received large numbers of German immigrants due to manufacturing interests on the Ohio river, thus making the culture there somewhat distinct from the rest of the state. Had Kentucky been a free-state, prior to the Civil War, it would have likely drawn more German immigration, as there was usually a relatively small number of slaves in the areas where Germans did settle. As of the 1980s, the only counties in the United States where over half of the population cited "English" as their only ancestry group were all in the hills of eastern Kentucky (and made up virtually every county in this region). In the 1980 census, 1,267,079 Kentuckians out of a total population of 2,554,359 cited that they were of English ancestry, making them 49 percent of the state at that time.

While varying degrees of southern cultural influence can be found in Kentucky inside the Cincinnati area and Louisville, smaller cities such as Owensboro, Lexington, Bowling Green, Hopkinsville and Paducah, together with most of the state's rural areas, have continued to be more distinctly Southern in character. Outside of those two specific areas, southern culture, dialect, mannerisms, etc. are prominent in Kentucky. Southern cuisine is also quite common across the state. Western Kentucky is famous for a regional style of southern barbecue, and other forms of southern food such as catfish, country ham, and green beans. Today most of the state, outside of Northern Kentucky, shares a cultural identity with Tennessee and the rest of the Upland South in ancestry, dialect, and various other aspects of culture.

In most contexts, especially culturally, the state is grouped as part of the south.

=== North Carolina ===
The Charlotte and Raleigh–Durham areas have attracted many new residents due to economic growth. This includes the banking/finance industries in Charlotte, along with the universities and high-tech industries in Raleigh-Durham. Wilmington has also become a center of Midwestern and Northern migration for its temperate coastal climate and growing business community. Meanwhile, Asheville and its surrounding area has tended to attract more progressively minded transplants, due to its longstanding reputation as a center of liberal thought and open-minded attitudes, and retirees settle here due to its scenic mountain setting.

In addition to an influx of Northerners, the job markets in North Carolina's three largest metropolitan regions—Charlotte, Raleigh-Durham, and the Greensboro–Winston-Salem–High Point Piedmont Triad—have also attracted large and growing Latino and Asian American immigration and migration. A report released by the Brookings Institution in May 2006 entitled Diversity Spreads Out, noted that the Charlotte metro area ranked second nationally with a 49.8% growth rate in its Hispanic population between 2000 and 2004. The Raleigh-Durham metro area followed in third place with a 46.7% rate of growth.

=== Oklahoma ===
Settlement of the Oklahoma Territory began as a direct result of the Civil War. Southerners escaping Reconstruction, largely populated the southern and eastern regions of the state. The term "Little Dixie" was first used in reference to southeastern Oklahoma during the 20th century. Italian laborers began arriving in eastern Oklahoma in the 1870s.

=== Texas ===
In the 1980 United States census, the largest ancestry group reported in Texas was English, with 3,083,323 Texans who identify as being of English ancestry forming roughly 27% of the population at the time. Their ancestry primarily goes back to the original thirteen colonies and for this reason many of them today simply claim "American" ancestry. Because of its size and unique history, particularly having once been Mexican territory, and later a nation in its own right (i.e. the Republic of Texas), Texas' modern-day relationship to the rest of the South is often a subject of debate and discussion. It has been described as "a Southern state, certainly, yet not completely in or of the South." The size and cultural distinctiveness of Texas prohibit easy categorization of the entire state into any recognized region. Geographic, economic and cultural diversity among regions of the state preclude treating Texas as a region in its own right. Notable extremes range from East Texas, which is often considered an extension of the Deep South, to Far West Texas, which is generally acknowledged to be part of the interior Southwest.

The upper Texas Panhandle and the South Plains areas of West Texas are part of the Great Plains. The former has much in common both culturally and geographically with Midwestern states like Kansas and Nebraska. The South Plains, though originally settled primarily by Anglo Southerners, has become a blend of both Southern and Southwestern culture due to rapidly increasing Hispanic population.

The larger cities of Texas, such as Austin, Dallas, and Houston have attracted migrants from other regions of the United States, particularly the Midwest and West Coast. Combined with the influence of increasing numbers from an African American New Great Migration, and also from Latin America and Asia, the historic "Southern culture" has been transformed.

However—partly due to its membership in the Confederacy and history as part of the Solid South—and the fact much of the state lies within the Bible Belt—it is usually considered more of a Southern than Western state. Also, linguistic maps of Texas place most of it within the spheres of upper, mid- and Gulf- Southern dialects, helping to further identify the state as being Southern (use of Southern colloquialisms such as y'all and ain't are still very much widespread in Texas).

=== Virginia ===
Based on a study from the late 1990s, 82% of Virginians believe they live in the South and most identify more with the South than with any other region. They uphold many traditions and beliefs of the South and take pride in their heritage. However, areas such as Northern Virginia, Richmond, and the Hampton Roads region have attracted many internal migrants coming for job opportunities with the federal government, military, and related businesses during and since World War II. Northern Virginia also connects to the emergence and expansion of the Northeast Megalopolis. More expansion resulted from the dot-com bubble around the start of the 21st century. Economically linked to Washington, D.C. and having a large migrant presence, residents of urban areas in Virginia tend to consider its culture more Mid-Atlantic than Southern.

Virginian culture was spread across the Chesapeake region during colonial times by settlers and strongly influenced the culture of the Lowland South through the transport of slaves. Virginia's coastal areas were heavily plantation based, relying on tobacco production for its economic base. Prior to the Civil War, Virginia was the largest slave state population wise and profited greatly from breeding and selling slaves to the Deep South. These slaves were thoroughly integrated into colonial Virginian culture and brought their traditions from Virginia to the Deep South where they blended with Gullah and Creole traditions. Following the Civil War and Reconstruction, Virginia went through the dark period of Jim Crow laws and faced the era of Massive Resistance to school desegregation. However, cities like Richmond and Norfolk have always been much more progressive and urban in culture than many rural areas of the state. They were known early on for having large Free Black, Quaker, and Jewish populations, much industry, and significant immigration from Eastern Europe up until the Civil War, in which Richmond was made the Confederate capital despite voting against secession. Today, Richmond and Norfolk are often considered the border between the Mid-Atlantic and Upper South, having distinct Southern characteristics and also ties to the Northeast Megalopolis. These remain the only two large cities in the country in which old fashioned Chesapeake Bay style culture is found with the distinctive Tidewater accent and many historic plantations still prevalent throughout the region.

Modern Virginia has seen an ongoing tendency for Northeasterners who move to the state to identifying separately from the rest of the South politically and culturally. However, they choose to remain in Virginia for better economic opportunities than those available further North, as well as the low tax rates.

=== West Virginia ===
West Virginia was formed during the American Civil War in 1863 from 50 western counties of Virginia and is currently composed of 55 counties. Many of the counties in the new state had supported Virginia and the Confederacy during the war but were included for territorial reasons, which resulted in a "Redeemer" government in 1876.

Many legacies of its Virginia heritage remain, such as county and local place names. The state constitution is based on the antebellum constitution of Virginia. As recently as 2007 an 1849 Virginia statute was used in a county prosecution. Historic plantation houses are found throughout the state, legacies of its antebellum origins. West Virginia was the last slave state admitted to the Union. The state legislature consists of a senate and a house of delegates. The state government belongs to the Southern Governors Association and the Southern Legislative Conference.

It is the 7th most Protestant state and the 7th most religious state in the United States. Out migration has been a steady phenomenon, beginning after the Civil War when ex-Confederates moved into southern Ohio to escape the political sanctions in their new home state. In the 20th century out migration increased as West Virginians moved north for jobs in industry.

West Virginia has a high rate of family owned farms and the state produces large numbers of poultry, corn, apples and peaches. Tobacco production peaked in 1909 at 14,400,000 pounds, and was the second most valuable crop as recently as 1983 but is no longer a popular commodity.

Many southern dishes are common in the state; biscuits and sausage gravy, chicken and dumplings, sweet tea, cornbread and beans and condiments such as cole slaw and chow chow accompany barbecued meats. The southern diet has been blamed for health problems such as obesity and diabetes and smoking is among the highest rates in the United States. Southern Appalachian dialect can be heard in much of the state though mostly south of Clarksburg.

Country music is one of the most popular genres in the state, WWVA Jamboree out of Wheeling was the second oldest venue for country music after the Grand Ole Opry in Nashville. Charleston is one of the highest per capita markets for country music. Some of West Virginia's notable musicians include Little Jimmy Dickens, Brad Paisley, Hazel Dickens, Red Sovine, Hawkshaw Hawkins, Molly O'Day, and the rockabilly musician Hasil Adkins.

=== Maryland ===
Similar to other Border States, Maryland has regions that are culturally Southern, and it is situated below the Mason–Dixon line. Prior to the second half of the 20th century, Maryland was largely Southern with strong connections to northern industry as Baltimore served as a center for grain trading. However, economic growth and demographic shifts of the 1970s, 1980s and 1990s overshadowed Maryland's Southern culture. The growing service economy and ensuing southward migration of New Englanders and more solidly Northeastern workers, transformed the I-95 corridor and the Baltimore-Washington Metropolitan Area into robustly Mid-Atlantic areas. Suburbs of Washington, D.C., have also become more Mid-Atlantic in nature, and less culturally southern than before.

Portions of Maryland, specifically Southern Maryland and the Eastern Shore of Maryland remain largely culturally Southern, driven by agriculture and commercial fishing. Most of the land is rural and there are but a few large population centers. Many local restaurants in these two areas still serve sweet tea and dishes including or composed entirely of greens, in addition to menus heavy with fried food. Many dialectic studies show that St. Mary's County in Southern Maryland and Dorchester County, Somerset County, Wicomico County, and Worcester County in the Eastern Shore have southern accents.

Western Maryland is considered Appalachian, and is largely rural. The region is very similar to the neighboring West Virginia, Virginia, and Pennsylvania.

=== Delaware ===
In a manner similar to Maryland, Delaware exhibits characteristics of both the Northeast and South. Unlike other surrounding states which are either north or south of the Mason–Dixon line, Delaware is uniquely situated east of the line (as the line takes a vertical turn along the state's western border). Generally, the rural Southern (or "Slower Lower") regions of Delaware below the Chesapeake and Delaware Canal embody a Southern culture, while densely populated Northern Delaware above the canal—particularly Wilmington, a part of the Philadelphia metropolitan area—has more in common with that of the Northeast.

=== Beyond the Census-classified South ===
==== Missouri ====
Missouri is classified as a Midwestern state by the Census Bureau and a large majority of its residents. St. Louis was known as the "Gateway to the West" when settlement was expanding. The northern edge of the Ozark Plateau was settled chiefly by mid-to-late 19th century German immigrants, who founded numerous vineyards and wineries. Due to this, Missouri was the second-largest wine-producing state before Prohibition, which destroyed the industry. Wineries have been rebuilt since the later decades of the 20th century, and Missouri wineries are competing well in national festivals. Part of the Missouri River valley, from beyond St. Louis suburbs in St. Charles County to east of Jefferson City, is known as the Missouri Rhineland because of the extensive vineyards and wineries based on German immigrant tradition and descendants.

In the antebellum years, many settlers from Upper South states, such as Virginia and Kentucky, migrated to the counties of central and western Missouri along the Missouri River, where they could cultivate tobacco and hemp. Because these southerners brought their culture and slaveholding practices with them, Missouri was admitted to the Union as a slaveholding state. During the mid-20th century, this area became known as Little Dixie. Before the Civil War, six of the counties included in this area had populations in which more than 25% were enslaved African Americans, the highest concentrations in the state outside the cotton plantations in the Mississippi Delta. Antebellum houses typical of the South, still stand in some of Little Dixie. All the crops grown there today are corn, soybeans and wheat, for which the area was better suited than for Southern crops like cotton or tobacco. Rural southern Missouri in the Ozark Plateau and the bootheel, are definitively southern in culture.

==== Midwest, Southwest, and West ====
Many areas of New Mexico, Arizona, and California were predominantly settled by European American southerners as they moved west in the 19th and early 20th centuries. For instance, pro-Confederate governments were established in what is now Arizona and New Mexico during the Civil War and, at one point, southern California was on the cusp of breaking away from northern California and joining the Confederacy.

In the aftermath of the Civil War, several freedmen's towns were founded by emancipated African Americans from the south.

Southerners migrated to industrial cities in the Midwest for work before and after World War II. They went to states such as Michigan, Indiana, and Ohio, as well as Missouri and Illinois. During the Great Depression and Dust Bowl crisis, a large influx of migrants from areas such as Oklahoma, Arkansas and the Texas Panhandle settled in California. These "Okie" and "Arkie" migrants and their descendants remain a strong influence on the culture of the Central Valley of California, especially around the cities of Bakersfield and Fresno.

More than 6.5 million African Americans left the segregated South for the industrial cities of the Midwest and West Coast during the Great Migration, beginning in World War I and extending to 1970. Many migrants from Arkansas, Louisiana and Texas moved to California during and after World War II because of jobs in the defense industry. As a result, many African Americans, as well as European Americans, have "Northern" and "Southern" branches of their families. Significant parts of African-American culture, such as music, literary forms and cuisine, have been rooted in the South, but have changed with urban northern and western influences as well.

== Cuisine ==
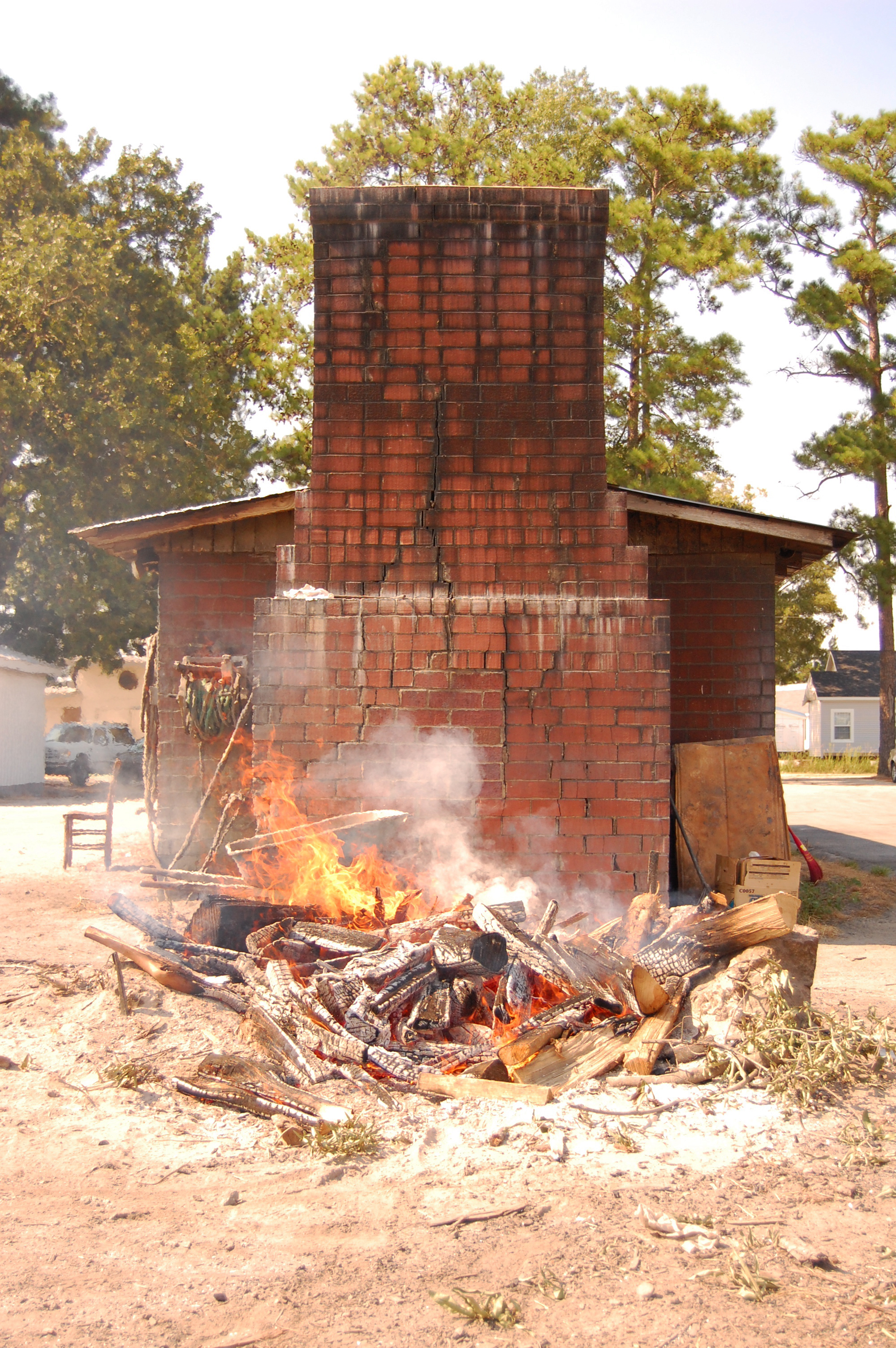
A wood-fired barbecue pit at Wilbur's Barbecue in Goldsboro, North Carolina

As an important feature of Southern culture, the cuisine of the South is often described as one of its most distinctive traits. Popular sayings include "Food is Love" and "If it ain't fried it ain't cooked". Southern culinary culture has readily adopted indigenous influences. Corn meal cereal known as "grits", corn fritters, cornbread, brunswick stew, and barbecue are a few of the more common examples of foods adopted directly from southeastern native-American communities. Nevertheless, a great many regional varieties have also developed. The variety of cuisines range from Tex-Mex cuisine, Cajun and Creole, traditional antebellum dishes, all types of seafood, along with Carolina, Virginia (which shares strong similarities with North Carolina) and Memphis styles of barbecue.

Traditional African American Southern food is often called soul food. While not typically as spicy as cajun food, it incorporates a variety of herbs and flour. Most Southern cities and even smaller towns now offer a wide variety of cuisines of other origins such as Chinese, Italian, Japanese, French, and Middle Eastern foods, as well as restaurants still serving primarily Southern specialties, so-called "home cooking" establishments. Some notable "home cooking" meals include fried chicken, corn on the cob, greens with pot liquor, vegetable stew, chicken and dumplings, and chicken fried steak.

=== Drinks ===
Iced tea is commonly associated with the South. Specifically, sweet tea, or brewed iced tea sweetened with granulated sugar, has traditionally been served in the South. In fact, most southern restaurants serve sweet tea in addition to "unsweet tea", whereas most restaurants in other regions serve only (unsweetened) iced tea.

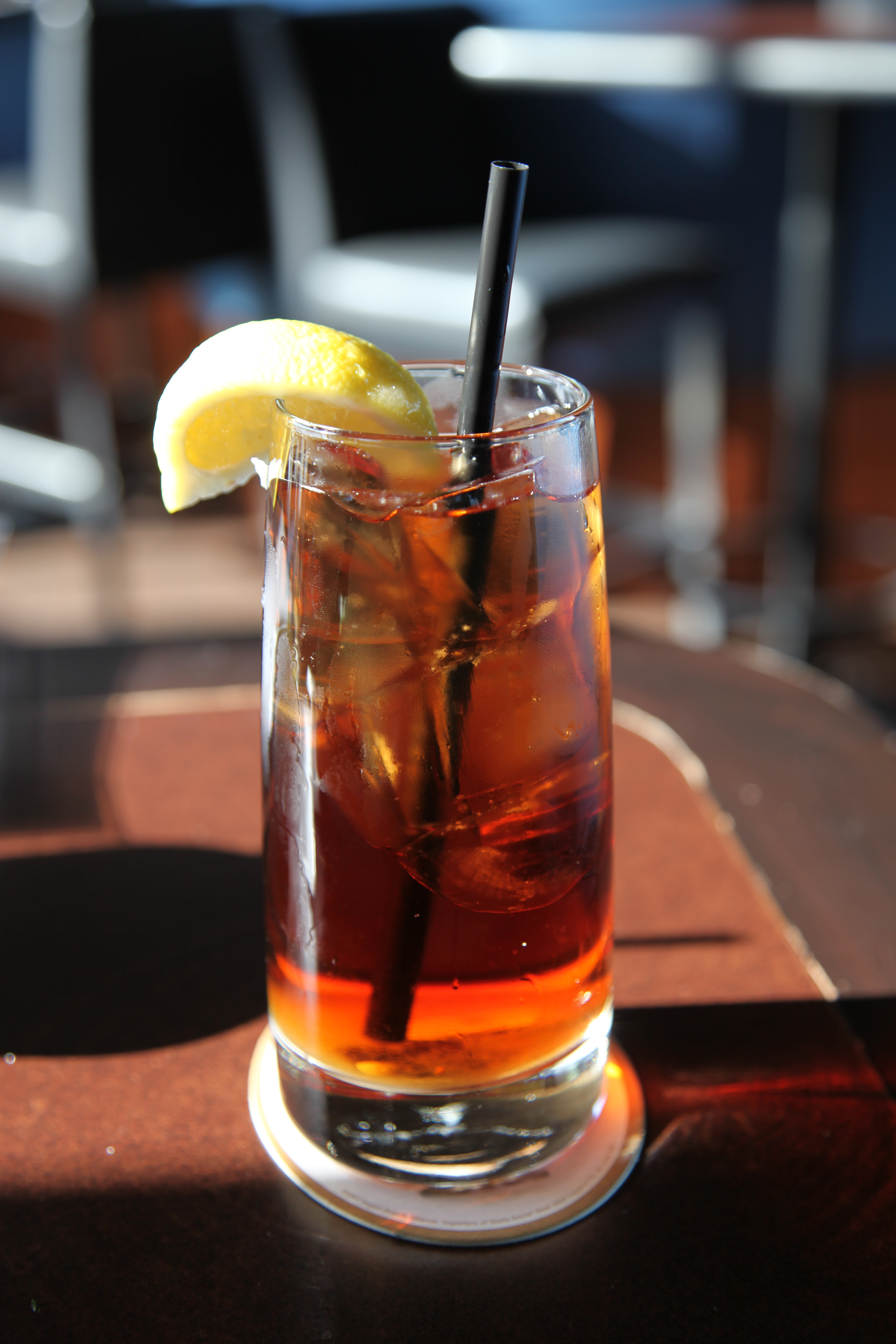
Iced tea with lemon

Many of the most popular American soft drinks originated in the South (Coca-Cola, Pepsi-Cola, Mountain Dew, Cheerwine, Big Red, Dr Pepper, RC Cola, and RC Cola's Nehi brand products). In much of Oklahoma, Arkansas, Tennessee, Georgia, Alabama, Texas, and other parts of the South, the term "soft drink" or "soda" is discarded in favor of "Coke" (see Genericized trademark).

Official support for Prohibition existed in the Southern states before and after the 18th Amendment was in force in the US. Due to widespread restrictions on alcohol production, illegally distilled liquor or moonshine has long been associated (often rather stereotypically) with working-class and poor people in much of the region, especially in southern Appalachia. Many southern states are control states that monopolize and highly regulate the distribution and sale of alcoholic beverages. Many counties in the South, particularly outside of the large metropolitan areas, are dry counties that do not allow for alcohol sales in retail outlets. However, many dry counties still allow for "private clubs" often with low daily fees to serve alcohol on the premises.

New Orleans is known as "the City that Care Forgot", epitomized by the saying laissez les bons temps rouler (let the good times roll). The Crescent City's culture revolves around food, drink, and community celebrations. Hurricanes are a famous French Quarter drink, as are sazerac cocktails and absinthe.

The Upper South, specifically Kentucky, is known for its production of bourbon whiskey, which is a popular base for cocktails. As of 2005, Kentucky was credited with producing 95% of the world's bourbon, which has been referred to as America's only native spirit. The mint julep is traditionally depicted as a popular beverage among more affluent Southerners. Many other bourbons are produced in Kentucky including Evan Williams, Wild Turkey, and Bulleit. Southern Comfort is a flavored distilled spirit modeled after bourbon and made in Louisiana.

Another form of spirit produced in the South is Tennessee Whiskey, with Jack Daniel's, made in Lynchburg, Tennessee being the number one selling whiskey in the world. George Dickel is produced in nearby Tullahoma, Tennessee.

== Literature ==
Born in the Boonslick region of Missouri to parents who had recently emigrated from Tennessee, Mark Twain is often placed within the pantheon of great Southern writers. Many of his works demonstrate his extensive knowledge of the Mississippi River and the South; also included in his works as a frequent theme were the injustice of slavery and the culture of Protestant public morality.

One of the best known southern writers of the 20th century is William Faulkner, who won the Nobel Prize in Literature in 1949. Faulkner brought new techniques such as stream of consciousness and complex techniques to American writing (such as in his novel As I Lay Dying). Faulkner was part of the Southern Renaissance movement.

The Southern Renaissance (also known as Southern Renascence) was the reinvigoration of American Southern literature that began in the 1920s and 1930s with the appearance of writers such as Faulkner, Caroline Gordon, Elizabeth Madox Roberts, Katherine Anne Porter, Allen Tate, Tennessee Williams, and Robert Penn Warren, among others.

The Southern Renaissance was the first mainstream movement within Southern literature to address the criticisms of Southern cultural and intellectual life that had emerged both from within the Southern literary tradition and from outsiders, most notably the satirist H. L. Mencken. In the 1920s Mencken led the attack on the genteel tradition in American literature, ridiculing the provincialism of American intellectual life. In his 1920 essay "The Sahara of the Bozart" (a pun on a Southern pronunciation of 'beaux-arts') he singled out the South as the most provincial and intellectually barren region of the US, claiming that since the Civil War, intellectual and cultural life there had gone into terminal decline. This created a storm of protest from within conservative circles in the South. However, many emerging Southern writers who were already highly critical of contemporary life in the South were emboldened by Mencken's essay. On the other hand, Mencken's subsequent bitter attacks on aspects of Southern culture that they valued amazed and horrified them. In response to the attacks of Mencken and his imitators, Southern writers were provoked to a reassertion of Southern uniqueness and a deeper exploration of the theme of Southern identity.

Other well-known Southern writers include Erskine Caldwell, Edgar Allan Poe, Joel Chandler Harris, Sidney Lanier, Cleanth Brooks, Pat Conroy, Harper Lee, Zora Neale Hurston, Eudora Welty, Ralph Ellison, Thomas Wolfe, William Styron, Flannery O'Connor, Carson McCullers, James Dickey, Willie Morris, Tom Wolfe, Truman Capote, Walker Percy, Charles Portis, Barry Hannah, Alice Walker, Cormac McCarthy, Anne Rice, Shelby Foote, John Grisham, Charlaine Harris, James Agee, Hunter S. Thompson, Wendell Berry, Bobbie Ann Mason, Harry Crews, and the authors known as the Southern Agrarians.

Possibly the most famous Southern novel of the 20th century is Gone with the Wind by Margaret Mitchell, published in 1937. Another famous Southern novel, To Kill a Mockingbird by Harper Lee, won the Pulitzer Prize after it was published in 1960.

== Music ==
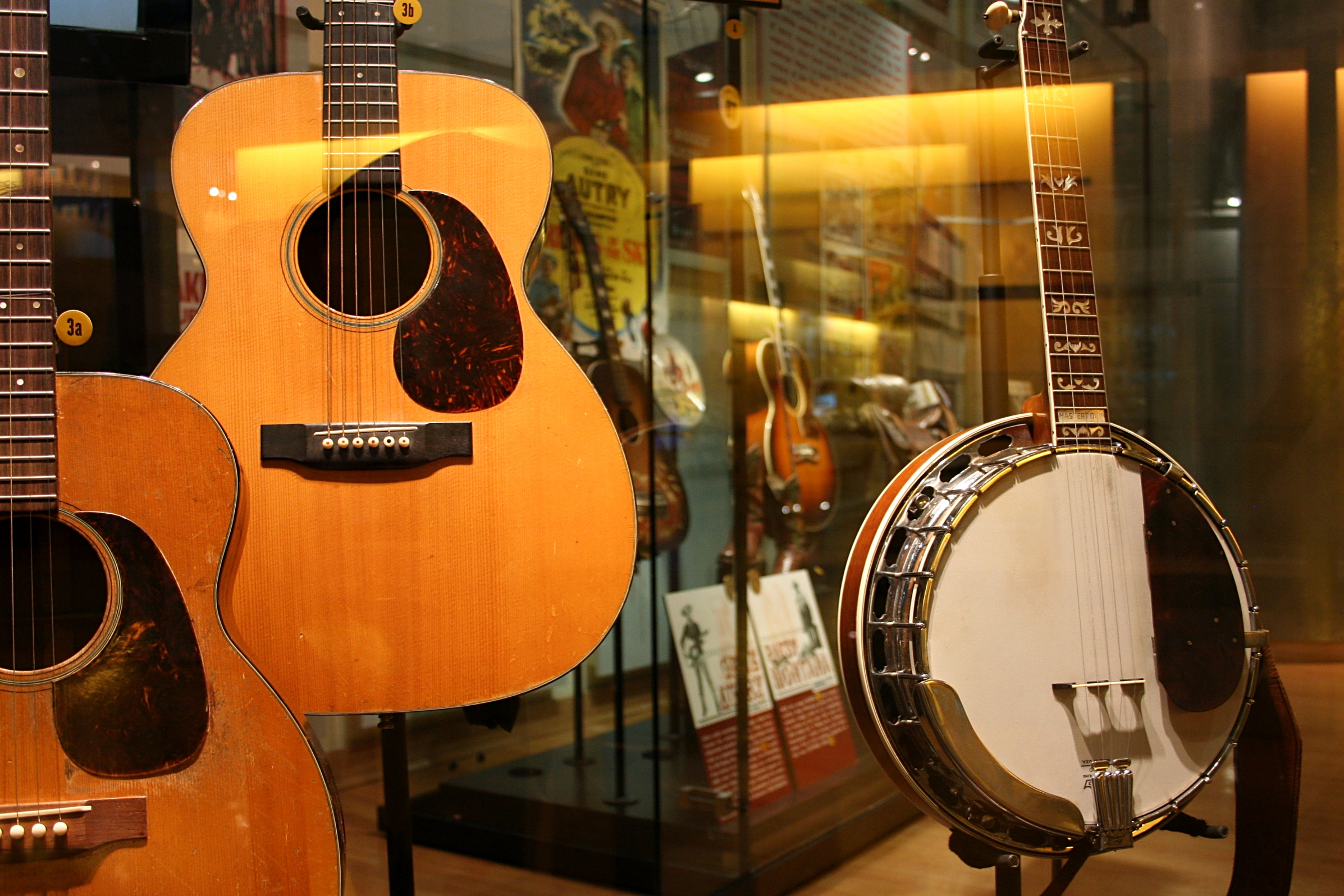
Country music originated in the Southern United States, and the country music industry is based in Nashville, Tennessee.

The musical heritage of the South was developed by both white and black artists, both influencing each other directly and indirectly.

Stax Records, Hi Records, and Goldwax Records released deep soul singles and albums. In the 1960s, Stax Records emerged as a leading competitor of Motown Records, laying the groundwork for later stylistic innovations in the process. In general, country music is based on the folk music of white Southerners, and blues and rhythm and blues is based on African American southern forms. However, whites and blacks alike have contributed to each of these genres, and there is a considerable overlap between the traditional music of blacks and whites in the South, especially in gospel music forms. A stylish variant of country music (predominantly produced in Nashville) has been a consistent, widespread fixture of American pop since the 1950s, while insurgent forms (i.e. bluegrass) have traditionally appealed to more discerning sub-cultural and rural audiences. Blues dominated the African American music charts from the advent of modern recording until the mid-1950s, when it was supplanted by the less guttural and forlorn sounds of rock and R&B. Nevertheless, unadulterated blues (along with early rock and roll) is still the subject of reverential adoration throughout much of Europe and cult popularity in isolated pockets of the United States.

Zydeco, Cajun and swamp pop, despite having never enjoyed greater regional or mainstream popularity, still thrive throughout French Louisiana and its peripheries, such as Southeastern Texas. These unique Louisianan styles of folk music are celebrated as part of the traditional heritage of the people of Louisiana. Conversely, bluegrass music has acquired a sophisticated cachet and distinct identity from mainstream country music through the fusion recordings of artists like Bela Fleck, David Grisman, and the New Grass Revival; traditional bluegrass and Appalachian mountain music experienced a strong resurgence after the release of 2001's O Brother, Where Art Thou?.

Rock n' roll largely began in the South in the late 1940s and early 1950s. Early rock n' roll musicians from the South include Jerry Lee Lewis, Buddy Holly, Little Richard, Fats Domino, Big Mama Thornton, Bo Diddley, Elvis Presley, Ray Charles, James Brown, Otis Redding, and Carl Perkins, among many others. Hank Williams, Charlie Feathers, and Johnny Cash, while generally regarded as "country" singers, also had a significant role in the development of rock music, giving rise to the "crossover" genre of rockabilly. Many who got their start in the regional show business in the South eventually banked on mainstream national and international success as well: Elvis Presley and Dolly Parton are two such examples of artists that have transcended genres.

The South has continued to produce rock music in later decades. In the 1970s, a wave of Southern rock and blues rock groups, led by The Allman Brothers Band, Lynyrd Skynyrd, ZZ Top, and 38 Special, became popular. Macon, Georgia-based Capricorn Records helped to spearhead the Southern rock movement, and was the original home to many of the genre's most famous groups. At the other end of the spectrum, along with the aforementioned Brown and Stax, New Orleans' Allen Toussaint and The Meters helped to define the funk subgenre of rhythm and blues in the 1970s.

Beginning in the 1980s, a number of distinctive Southern hip-hop styles have emerged. Many Southern rappers have emerged from Atlanta, including Outkast, Ludacris, and crunk artists like Lil Jon; Atlanta is also the home of the trap music movement, which produced 2000s stars such as T.I., Jeezy, and Gucci Mane, as well as 2010s rappers such as 2 Chainz and Future. Meanwhile, Miami produced commercially successful Southern hip-hop as early as the mid-1980s, primarily through Miami bass acts like 2 Live Crew. New Orleans produced notable hip-hop stars like Juvenile and Lil Wayne, as well as the bounce music scene that has yielded stars like Big Freedia. Houston's DJ Screw created the chopped and screwed style, which was popularized in the mid-2000s by rappers like Slim Thug, Paul Wall, and Chamillionaire. Memphis has long nurtured an underground rap scene from which influential acts like Three 6 Mafia have emerged.

Many of the roots of alternative rock are often considered to come from the South as well, with bands such as R.E.M., the B-52s, and Indigo Girls associated with the college town of Athens, Georgia. Cities such as Austin, Knoxville, Chapel Hill, Nashville and Atlanta also have indie rock and live music scenes. Austin is home to the South by Southwest music and arts festival, while several influential independent music labels (Sugar Hill, Merge, Yep Rock and the now-defunct Mammoth Records) were founded in the Chapel Hill area. Several l death metal bands have recorded albums at Morrisound Recording in Temple Terrace, Florida and the studio is considered a touchstone in the genre's development.

There is a large underground heavy metal scene in the Southern United States. Death metal can trace some of its origins to Tampa, Florida. Bands such as Deicide, Morbid Angel, Six Feet Under, and Cannibal Corpse, among others, have come out of this scene. The South is also where sludge metal was born, and where its acts, Eyehategod and Crowbar come from, as well as other bands of the style such as Down and Corrosion of Conformity. Other known metal bands from the South include Crossfade, Pantera, Hellyeah, Lamb of God, and Mastodon. This has helped coin the term Southern metal. Other heavy metal and hardcore punk subgenres, including metalcore and post-hardcore, have also become popular in this region.

== Sports ==
Main article: Sports in the United States

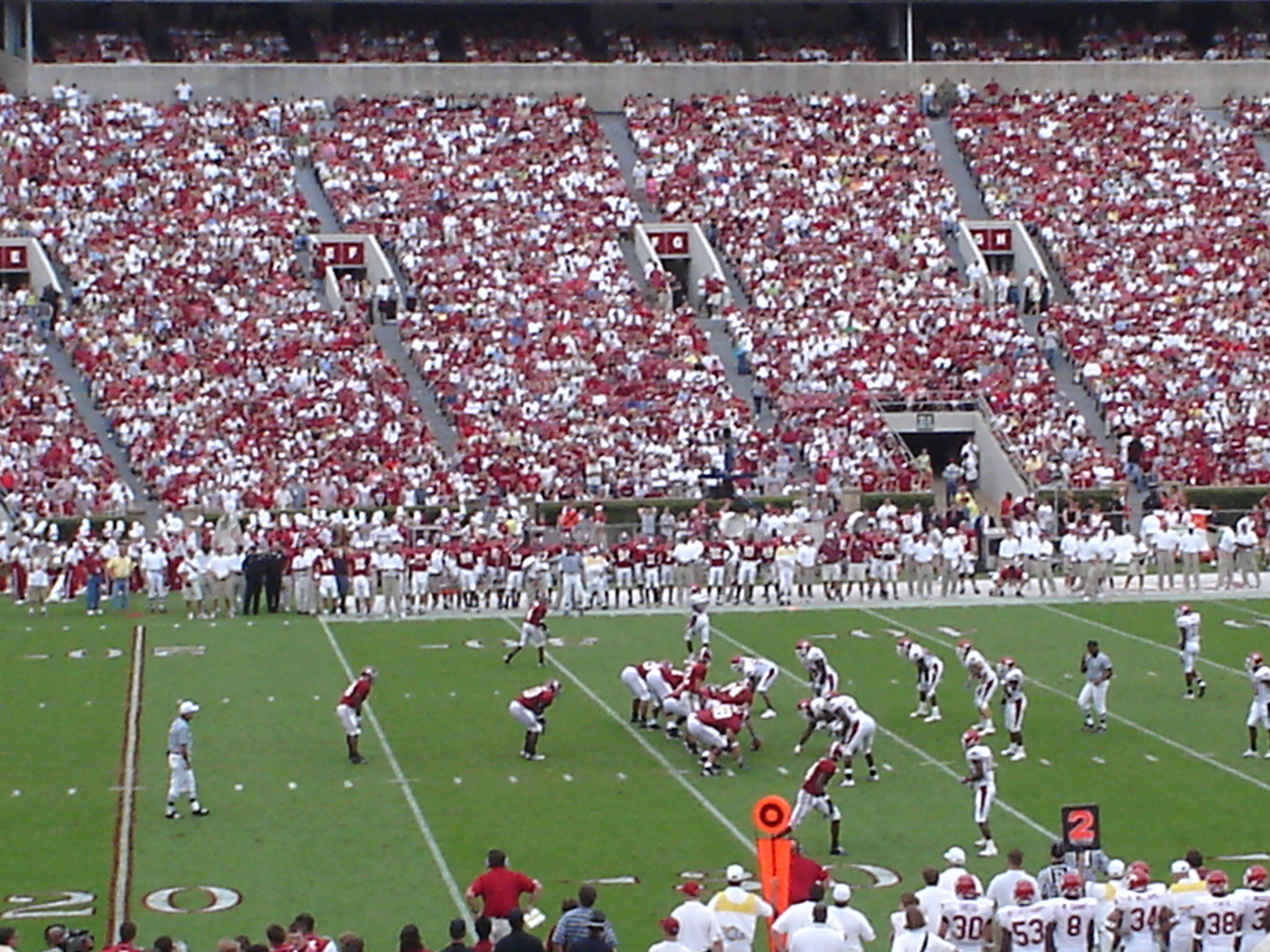
College football game between the Alabama Crimson Tide and the Arkansas Razorbacks in 2005

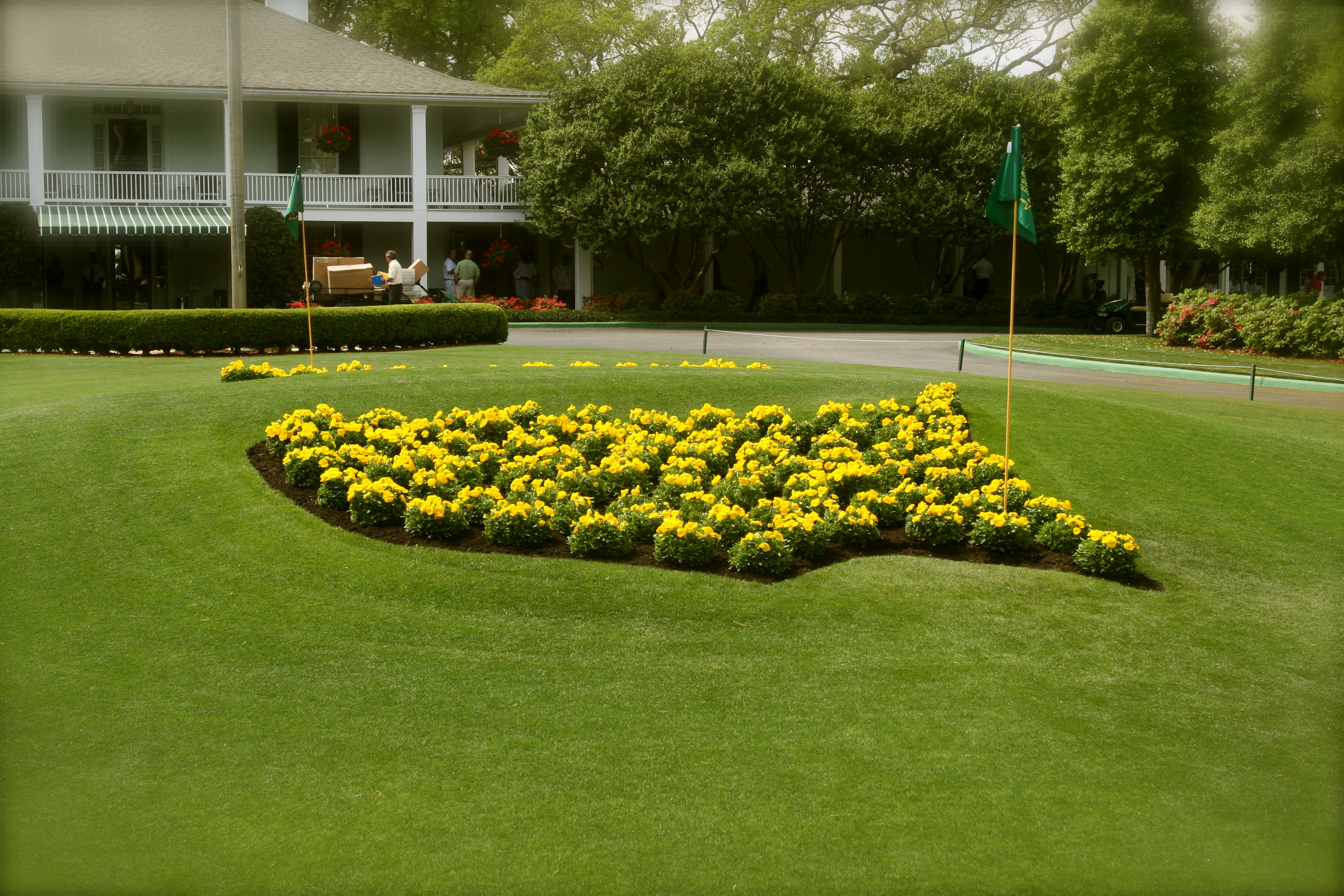
The Masters logo made of flowers at Augusta National Golf Club

While the South has National Football League (NFL) franchises in Dallas, Houston, Miami, Atlanta, New Orleans, Tampa, Jacksonville, Charlotte, and Nashville, the region is noted for the intensity with which people follow college football teams, especially those in the Southeastern Conference (SEC), Atlantic Coast Conference (ACC), and Big 12 Conference (Big 12). In states such as Texas and Oklahoma, high school football, particularly in smaller communities, is a dominating activity.

Basketball is also popular, particularly college basketball. The Duke Blue Devils and North Carolina Tar Heels enjoy one of the great rivalries in American sports. As of 2019, Kentucky as a state has 11 national championships won by two schools, the University of Louisville and the University of Kentucky; North Carolina has 13 statewide national championships, coming from the combined victories of Duke, UNC, and NC State. The National Basketball Association (NBA) is well-represented in the South as well, with franchises in Atlanta, Charlotte, Orlando, Miami, Memphis, New Orleans, Houston, Dallas, San Antonio, and Oklahoma City.

Taking advantage of warmer late-winter weather, many professional baseball teams began training in Florida in the spring, starting in the 1920s and 15 teams continue to train there each year. Regular season Major League Baseball (MLB) in Atlanta began in 1966, when the Milwaukee Braves transferred its franchise to the city. Expansion teams were added to Texas with the Houston Astros and Texas Rangers in the 1960s and 70s, while Florida became home to the Miami Marlins in 1993 and Tampa Bay Rays in 1998. At one time, a number of minor league baseball leagues flourished in the South. The region is still home to more minor league teams than any other region of the United States.

Normally associated with cold climates, five National Hockey League (NHL) franchises are based in the south: the Dallas Stars, Tampa Bay Lightning, Florida Panthers, Nashville Predators, and Carolina Hurricanes (six if the Washington Capitals are counted as Southern).

The South is also the birthplace of NASCAR auto racing. Journalist Ben Shackleford says it flourishes there because "the violence and danger of the sport resonated with growing idealization of the traditional Southern culture." Race tracks that host NASCAR sanctioned events are found in several different locations in the South, including Martinsville, Virginia, Talladega, Alabama, Bristol, Tennessee, Darlington, South Carolina, Dover, Delaware, Sparta, Kentucky, Daytona, Florida, Charlotte, Atlanta, Miami, Richmond, Virginia, and Fort Worth, Texas.

Other popular sports in the South include golf (which can be played almost year-round because of the South's mild climate), fishing, soccer, and hunting wild game. Augusta, Georgia is the host city of The Masters (one of golf's premier tournaments held each spring) and home to 15 golf courses.

Atlanta was the host of the 1996 Summer Olympics.

== Film ==
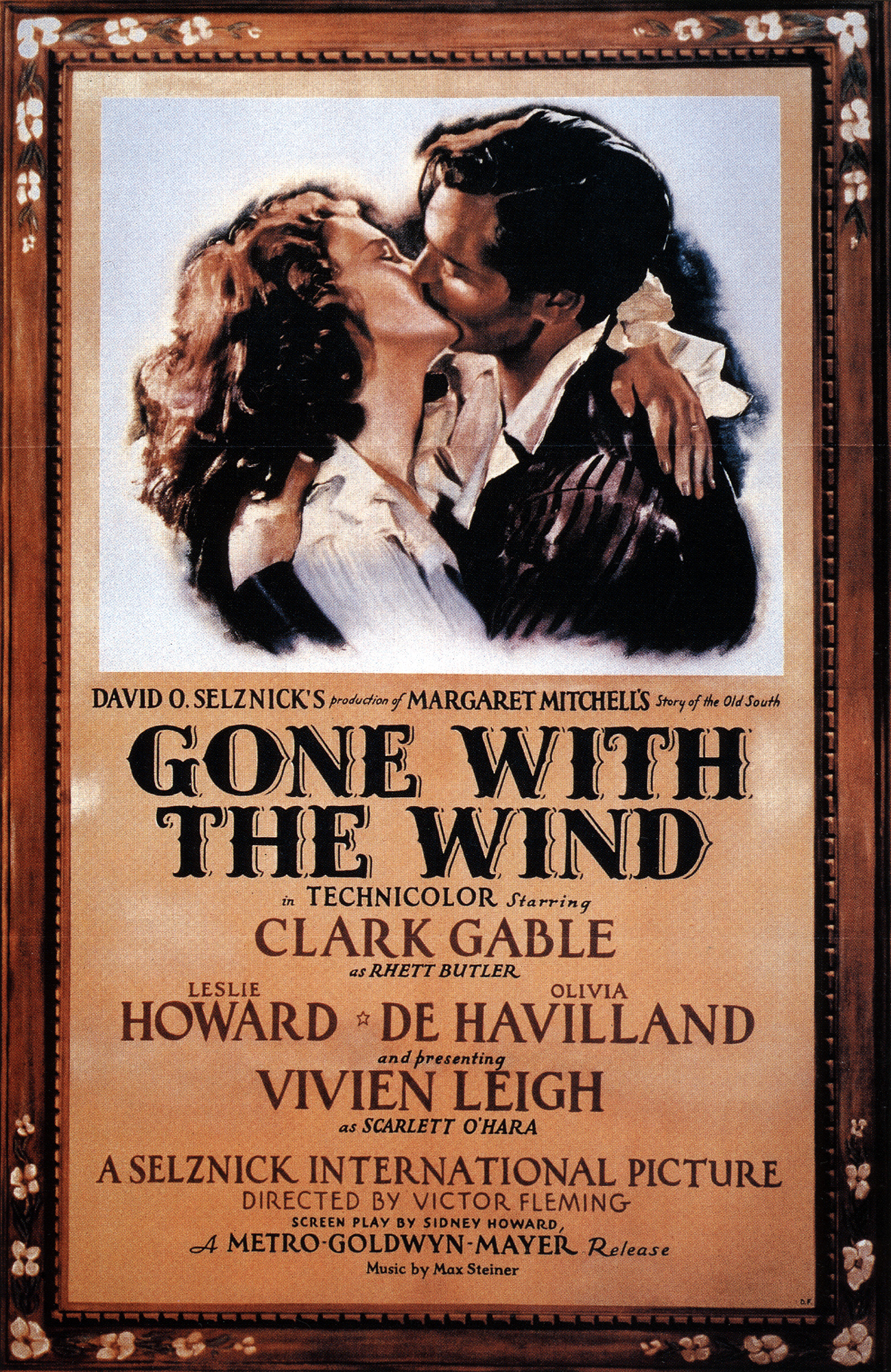
A poster for the film Gone with the Wind

Many critically acclaimed movies have been set in the cultural background of the South. A partial list of these films follows – for a more complete listing of Southern cinema, see list of films set in the Southern United States.

- Gone with the Wind (1939)
- The Yearling (1946)
- Song of the South (1946)
- All the King's Men (1949)
- A Streetcar Named Desire (1951)
- Wild River (1960)
- The Miracle Worker (1962)
- To Kill a Mockingbird (1962)
- Hud (1963)
- Deliverance (1972)
- The Longest Yard (1974)
- Scarface (1983)
- The Color Purple (1985)
- Bull Durham (1988)
- Mississippi Burning (1988)
- Driving Miss Daisy (1989)
- Great Balls Of Fire! (1989)
- Steel Magnolias (1989)
- Fried Green Tomatoes (1991)
- Forrest Gump (1994)
- Jason's Lyric (1994)
- Ghosts of Mississippi (1996)
- A Time To Kill (1996)
- Sling Blade (1996)
- Midnight in the Garden of Good and Evil (1997)
- Eve's Bayou (1997)
- The Green Mile (1999)
- O Brother, Where Art Thou? (2000)
- Remember the Titans (2000)
- The Patriot (2000)
- A Walk to Remember (2002)
- Sweet Home Alabama (2002)
- Big Fish (2003)
- Friday Night Lights (2004)
- The Notebook (2004)
- Ray (2004)
- Wedding Crashers (2005)
- The Dukes of Hazzard (2005)
- Talladega Nights: The Ballad of Ricky Bobby (2006)
- Shotgun Stories (2007)
- Dream Boy (2008)
- The Curious Case of Benjamin Button (2008)
- The Blind Side (2009)
- Dear John (2010)
- The Help (2011)
- Beasts of the Southern Wild (2012)
- Lawless (2012)
- Mud (2013)
- 12 Years a Slave (2013)
- Free State of Jones (2016)
- Midnight Special (2016)
- Green Book (2018)
- Just Mercy (2019)

== Television ==
Following the boom of television in the 1950s, many network television shows were set in the South and/or became very popular with Southerners. They included:

- The Real McCoys (1957–1963)
- The Andy Griffith Show (1960–1968)
- The Beverly Hillbillies (1962–1971)
- Petticoat Junction (1963–1970)
- Flipper (1964–1967)
- Green Acres (1965–1971)
- Hee Haw (1969–1992)

By 1971, sponsors had shifted for this formula and CBS consequently cancelled all of its Southern shows, as part of the rural purge. (Only Hee Haw survived, in syndication.)

In 1976, Jimmy Carter was elected as the first President of the United States from the Deep South subregion. The election resulted in reporters swarming into Carter's small southern town of Plains, Georgia. Speculation about his lifestyle and Southern Baptist faith, renewed interest in Southern culture. A new crop of television shows followed within the next decade, such as:

- Carter Country (1977–1979)
- Dallas (1978–1991)
- The Dukes of Hazzard (1979–1985)
- Mama's Family (1983–1990)
- The Golden Girls (1985–1992)
- Matlock (1986–1995)
- Designing Women (1986–1993)
- In the Heat of the Night (1988–1995)

In addition, network television shows set in the South since 1990 include:

- Evening Shade (1990–1994)
- Walker, Texas Ranger (1993–2001)
- Beavis and Butt-head (1993–1997)
- Reba (2001–2007)
- King of the Hill (1997–2009)
- One Tree Hill (2003–2012)
- American Dad! (2005–present)
- Friday Night Lights (2006–2011)
- The Riches (2007–2008)
- True Blood (2007–2014)
- The Cleveland Show (2009–2013)
- Eastbound and Down (2009–2013)
- Justified (2010–2015)
- The Walking Dead (2010–present)
- Hart of Dixie (2011–2015)
- Dallas (2012–2014)
- Nashville (2012–2018)
- True Detective (2014–present)
- Bless the Harts (2019–2021)
- Outer Banks (2020–present)
- Young Sheldon (2017–2024)

Critics point out that some of these shows and films, stereotype Southerners as "hapless hicks" or "a universally simple and often silly group of inhabitants", especially in contrast to the far more complex literary portrayals, and argue that they do not fairly represent Southerners' culture.

== Popular culture images of Southerners ==
Since the early 19th century, Southerners have been the subject of stereotypes, epithets and ridicule. Traces remain in the media, usually in humorous form, as in the 1960s TV series, The Beverly Hillbillies, a situation comedy, which depicts the cultural dissonance of a poor backwoods family that moves to upscale California after striking oil on their land. Many poor Southern whites make fun of the stereotypes. Images typically depict Southerners as laid-back, hospitable, jolly and carefree—and lazy. The hostile epithet "white trash" originated among house slaves in the 1830s to ridicule whites of low income or low morality.

During the early periods of the South, travelers often emphasized the backward, uneducated, uncouth, dirty or unhygienic, impoverished, and violent aspects of Southern life. A favorite theme especially regarding Appalachia and the Ozarks, portrayed "hicks" isolated from modern culture as shiftless male hunters, violently feuding clans like the Hatfields and McCoys, degraded women smoking corncob pipes, religious snake handlers, and compulsive banjo players.

The national stereotype of the South in 1917 can be glimpsed in a study of tobacco usage in the late 19th century written by a Northern historian who paid close attention to class and gender:

The chewing of tobacco was well-nigh universal. This habit had been widespread among the agricultural population of America both North and South before the war. Soldiers had found the quid a solace in the field and continued to revolve it in their mouths upon returning to their homes. Out of doors where his life was principally led the chewer spat upon his lands without offense to other men, and his homes and public buildings were supplied with spittoons. Brown and yellow parabolas were projected to right and left toward these receivers, but very often without the careful aim which made for cleanly living. Even the pews of fashionable churches were likely to contain these familiar conveniences. The large numbers of Southern men, and these were of the better class (officers in the Confederate army and planters, worth $20,000 or more, and barred from general amnesty) who presented themselves for the pardon of President Johnson, while they sat awaiting his pleasure in the ante-room at the White House, covered its floor with pools and rivulets of their spittle. An observant traveller in the South in 1865 said that in his belief seven-tenths of all persons above the age of twelve years, both male and female, used tobacco in some form. Women could be seen at the doors of their cabins in their bare feet, in their dirty one-piece cotton garments, their chairs tipped back, smoking pipes made of corn cobs into which were fitted reed stems or goose quills. Boys of eight or nine years of age and half-grown girls smoked. Women and girls "dipped" in their houses, on their porches, in the public parlors of hotels and in the streets.

The Progressive Era (1896–1917) brought attention to the problems the South faced. An influential scholarly study was Horace Kephart's Our Southern Highlanders (1913), which portrayed an isolated and culturally inert people. The bleak image inspired northern philanthropy, such as the Rockefeller foundations, to intervene using modern public health techniques and to promote better schooling.

Since the 1930s, however, Hollywood has used stereotypes of the South to contrast virtues of simple rural life, with the corruption that can be found in the city.

Comic strips dealt with northern urban experiences until 1934, when Al Capp introduced L'il Abner, the first strip based in the South. Although Capp was from Connecticut, he spent 43 years teaching the world about Dogpatch, reaching 60 million readers in over 900 American newspapers and 100 foreign papers in 28 countries. Inge says Capp, "had a profound influence on the way the world viewed the American South." Other popular strips on Southern life included Pogo, Snuffy Smith and Kudzu. Cultural historian Anthony Harkins argues that Dogpatch's hillbilly setting "remained a central touchstone, serving both as a microcosm and a distorting carnival mirror of broader American society."

== See also ==
- African-American culture
- African-American English
- African-American history
- African-American music
- Appalachia
- Appalachian English
- Bible Belt
- Black school
- List of Confederate monuments and memorials
  - Confederate battle flag
  - Neo-Confederates
  - Removal of Confederate monuments and memorials
- Cuisine of the Southern United States
- Culture of honor (Southern United States)
- Hillbilly
- History of the Southern United States
  - Deep South
  - New South
  - Old South
  - Upper South
- Plain Folk of the Old South
- Politics of the Southern United States
- Racism against African Americans
- Racism in the United States
- Redneck
- Soul food
- Southern Agrarians
- Southern American English
- Southern hip hop
- Southern hospitality
- Southern literature
- Southern rock
- Southern Spaces
- Southernization (U.S.)
- White supremacy
