= My Dog Skip =

My Dog Skip may refer to:

- My Dog Skip (book), a 1995 memoir by Willie Morris
- My Dog Skip (film), a 2000 American comedy-drama film, based on the book
