= Double (occupation) =

Actor who substitutes for another in a scene

Body double
Occupation
- Names: Body double, nude double, hand double, stunt double
- Activity sectors: Entertainment

Description
- Competencies: Resemblance to real actor or person
- Fields of employment: Film, television, theatre
- Related jobs: Stand-in, actor, movie star, decoy, political decoy

In filmmaking, a double is a person who substitutes for another actor such that the person's face is not shown. There are various terms associated with a double based on the specific body part or ability they serve as a double for, such as stunt double, "dance double", "butt double" and "hand double".

== Types of doubles ==
=== Body double ===
A body double or photography double is used in certain specific shots to replace the credited actor of a character. The body double's face is obscured to maintain the illusion that they are the same character; usually by shooting their body at an angle that leaves their face out (such as by showing the body double from the back) or in post-production by superimposing the original actor's face over the body double's. The double's face is usually not seen on-camera, particularly when they do not facially resemble the actor; a wig will usually be employed if the double's hair color is different from that of the main actor. This is in contrast to a stand-in, who replaces an actor for non-filming purposes such as scene arrangement and lighting adjustments.

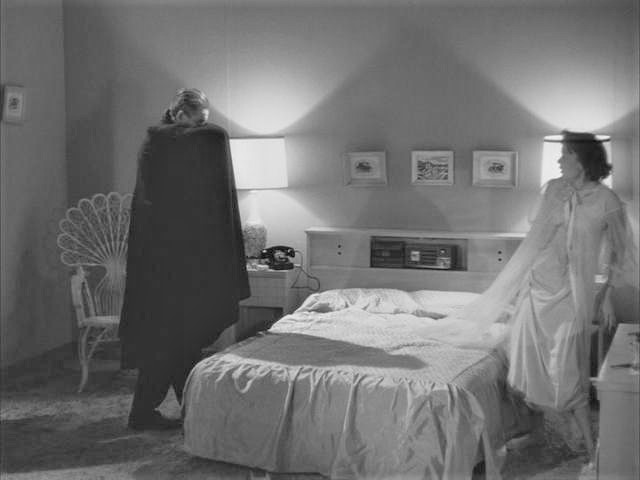
Tom Mason (left) standing in for deceased actor Bela Lugosi in the 1959 horror film Plan 9 from Outer Space

A body double must sometimes be able to recite their lines with the same timing as the actor, and also reproduce the exact physical actions in co-ordination with the other principal actors; usually, doubles must have a strong resemblance to the actor they replace. An extensively used body double, especially when used in cases where the credited actor is unavailable, unwilling to film or has died, is known as a fake Shemp.

A double can be used for cases where special skills are needed—such as playing musical instruments, dancing or other athletic abilities. Also, if only a part of the body is shown, the term for the double might be more specific. A common double is a "hand double", which is used to shoot inserts where only the hand or arm is in the shot. These inserts are often shot by the second unit with a double at a later point in production primarily because it allows the main unit to use the lead actors' time more efficiently.

Body doubles are often used for shots involving nudity. The reasons for this vary. Actors' nude bodies may have too many physical flaws and imperfections that would show on camera, especially due to aging, while some actors are uncomfortable performing nude. A common body double is the "butt double", mostly used with TV, since whole-body nudity is less common in that medium. The term "stunt butt" is also attested, as is "stunt cock".

In some productions, a scene calls for two characters in the same shot who are portrayed by a single actor. A body double can portray one of the characters, while the credited actor plays the other, thus enabling both characters to appear simultaneously on camera. An unusual example of body doubling took place in the movie Terminator 2: Judgment Day (1991). A scene requiring Linda Hamilton to appear as two Sarah Connors in the same scene was created by employing Hamilton's identical twin sister Leslie as her double. This has become less common with digital editing currently available which can splice together multiple takes, allowing for an actor to perform as each character in separate takes that are joined to create the image of the characters in same setting, such as with Deep Roy, who portrayed the Oompa-Loompas in Charlie and the Chocolate Factory (2005).

The 1984 film Body Double, directed by Brian De Palma, featured a plot that hinged on the discovery that one character had in fact served as a body double for another.

=== Stunt double ===
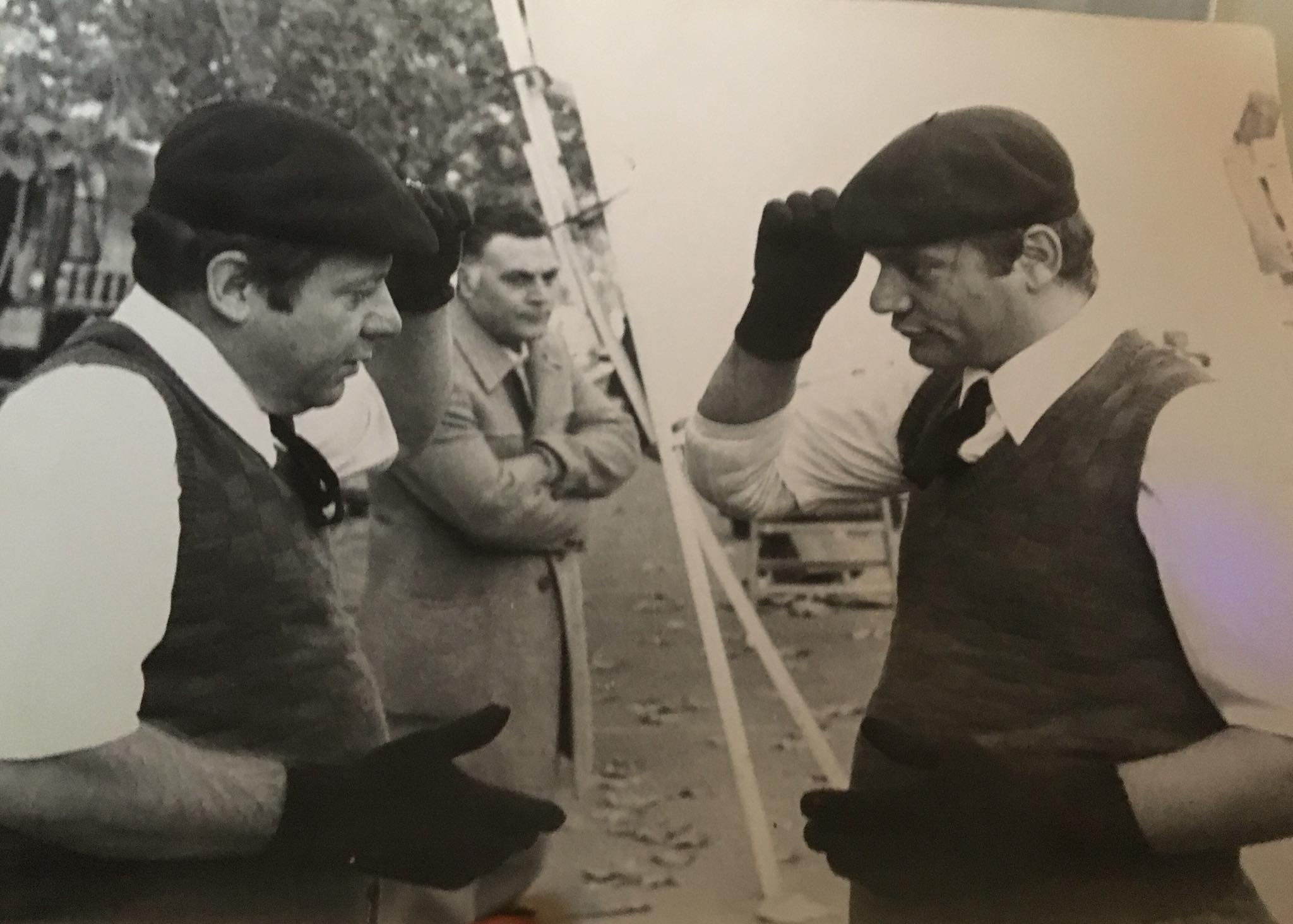
Actor Paolo Villaggio with his stunt double Clemente Ukmar, on the set of the 1975 film Fantozzi

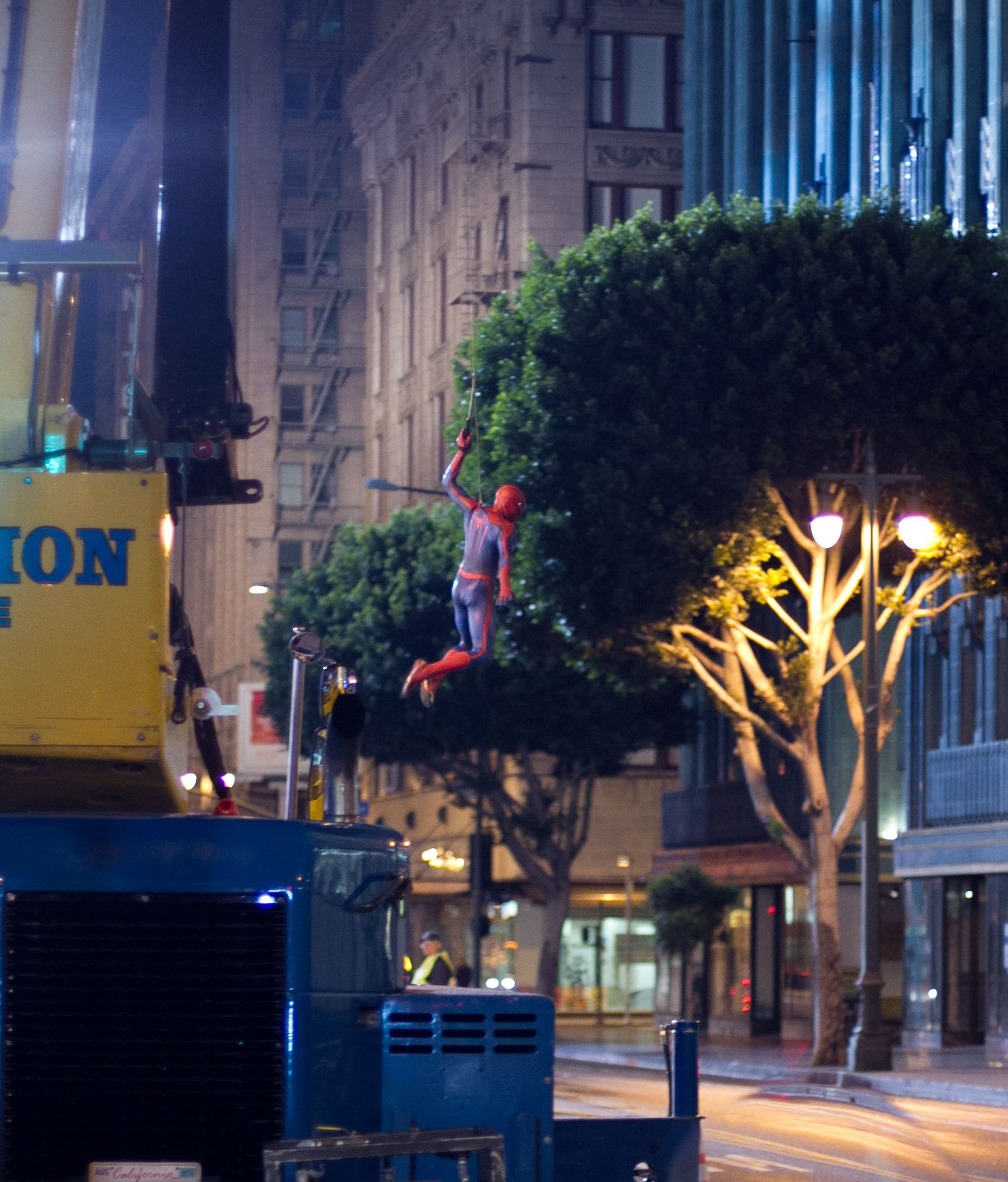
A stunt-double performing in a shoot from a commercial promoting the 2012 film The Amazing Spider-Man

A stunt double is often a stunt performer, specifically a skilled replacement, used for dangerous sequences or other sophisticated stunts (especially fight scenes). Stunt doubles may be used in cases where an actor's physical condition or age precludes much activity, or when an actor is contractually prohibited from taking certain risks.

Stunt doubles should be distinguished from daredevils, who perform stunts for the sake of the stunt alone, often as a career. Sequences often do not place stunt doubles in the same mortal peril as the characters: for example, harnesses and wires can be digitally removed from the final film.

Many stunt doubles have long production careers as part of a star actor's contractual "support crew", along with the star's cooks, trainers, dressers, and assistants. Often stunt doubles have to look like their respective actors, in order to maintain the illusion that it is the actor on-screen. Stunt doubles for Eddie Murphy, John Wayne, Harrison Ford, Steve Martin, Salman Khan and Michael Landon have been associated with their lead actors for decades.

Sometimes stunt doubles are cast in small roles apart from the actor they double for. In the episode "The Trouble with Tribbles" (1967) of the original Star Trek series (1966–1969), William Shatner's stunt double Paul Baxley was cast as Ensign Freeman, a minor character primarily seen during a bar fight.

Non-humans are also known to have stunt doubles. For example, Enzo was the stunt double for his aging sire Moose on the sitcom Frasier (1993–2004). Soccer, the Jack Russell Terrier on Wishbone (1995–1997), reportedly hated swimming and therefore had stunt doubles.

The practice of stunt doubling has seen a marked decline in recent years, particularly in high-budget productions. Advances in artificial intelligence and digital visual effects now allow filmmakers to enhance, modify, or safely simulate performances that once required a separate stunt double. At the same time, actors increasingly undergo specialized physical and combat training to perform complex action sequences themselves, reducing demand for stunt doubles.

=== Dance double ===
A dance double performs some or all of a character's dancing in place of an actor, particularly during technically demanding choreography. In some productions, visual effects are used to replace the double's face with the actor's.

For Flashdance (1983), Marine Jahan performed much of Jennifer Beals's technical dancing, gymnast Sharon Shapiro performed gymnastic movements, and Crazy Legs performed breaking moves in the final audition sequence. None of the three received an on-screen credit.

The use of a dance double attracted renewed attention after Black Swan (2010), in which American Ballet Theatre dancer Sarah Lane doubled for Natalie Portman. Digital effects were used to place Portman's face onto Lane's body, and after Portman won the Academy Award for Best Actress, Lane and the filmmakers publicly disputed how much of the dancing each performer had completed.

== See also ==
- Doppelgänger
- Digital face replacement
- Impersonation
- Look-alike
- Nudity clause
- Political decoy
- Shelley Michelle – American actress and body double
- Simulacrum
- Stand-in
- Fake Shemp
