= My Dog Skip (book) =

1995 memoir by Willie Morris

- Author: Willie Morris
- Language: English
- Publisher: Random House
- Publication date: 1995
- Publication place: United States

Cover of movie novelization

My Dog Skip is a memoir by Willie Morris published by Random House in 1995.

My Dog Skip is the story about nine-year-old Willie Morris growing up in Yazoo City, Mississippi, a tale of a boy and his dog in a small, sleepy Southern town that teaches about family, friendship, love, devotion, trust and bravery. Willie and Skip's relationship goes beyond that of owner and dog, but is a relationship recognized and celebrated by the entire town.

In 2000, the book was made into a film of the same name. Although Skip was a Fox Terrier, a number of Jack Russell Terriers were used in filming, two of which were Moose and Moose's son Enzo, who both portrayed Eddie on NBC's sitcom Frasier.
