= Willie Morris =

American writer and editor (1934–1999)

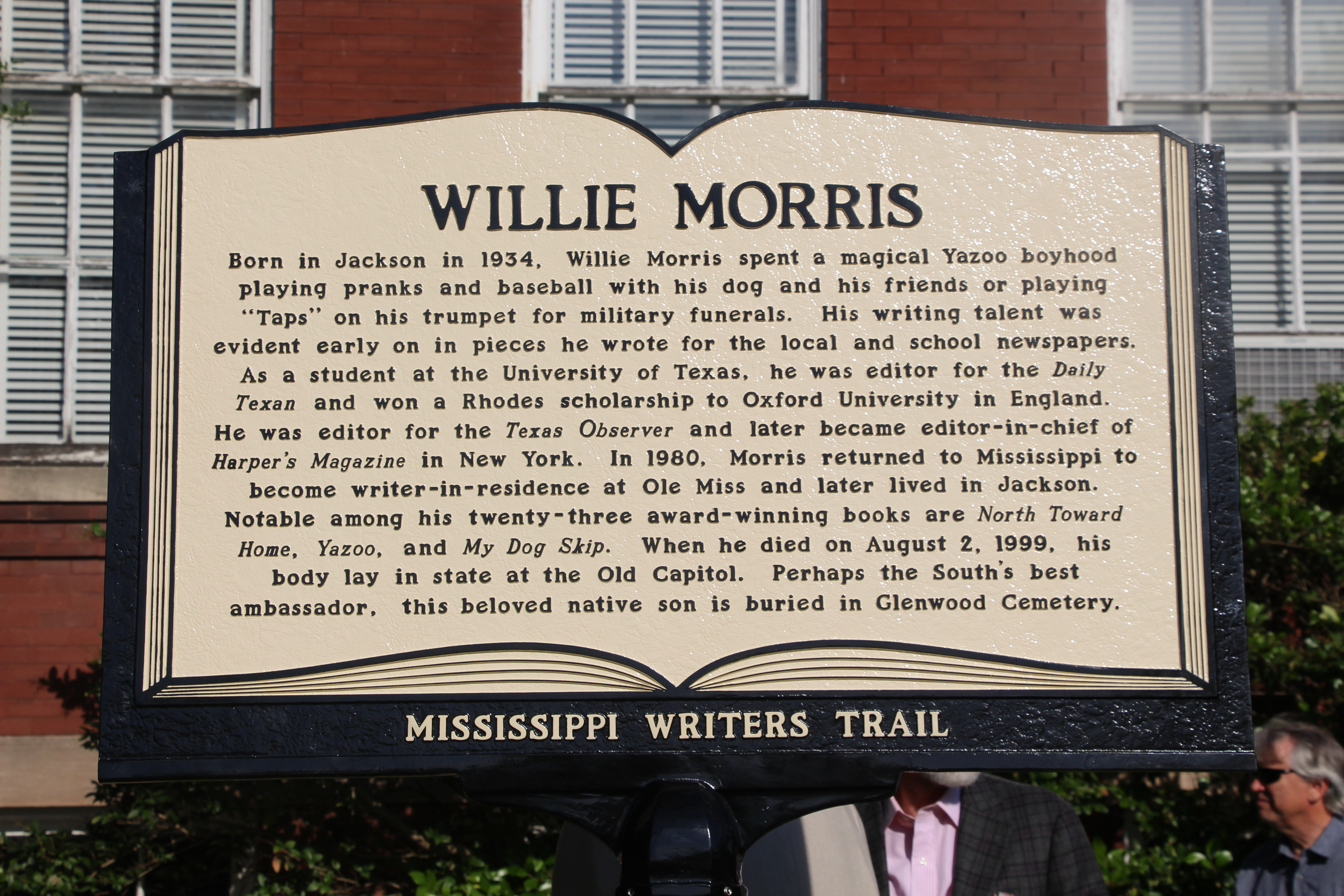
A historical marker installed in honor of Willie Morris at the Yazoo Triangle Cultural Center on June 4, 2022.

William Weaks Morris (November 29, 1934 – August 2, 1999) was an American writer and editor born in Jackson, Mississippi and raised in Yazoo City, Mississippi. Morris had a lyrical prose style which he lent to reflections on the American South, including Yazoo City and the Mississippi Delta. From 1967 to 1971 he was the editor of Harper's Magazine. He published more than 20 titles, works of both fiction and nonfiction, the best known of which are North Toward Home and My Dog Skip.

== Biography ==
=== Early years ===
Morris's parents moved to Yazoo City, Mississippi when he was six months old. Yazoo City figures prominently in much of Morris's writing. After graduating as valedictorian of his Yazoo City High School class, Morris attended the University of Texas at Austin. He became a member of Delta Tau Delta international fraternity, where a room is named after him in the chapter house.

In his senior year Morris was elected editor of the university's student newspaper, The Daily Texan. His editorials against segregation, censorship and collusion between state officials and oil and gas interests earned him the enmity of university administrators, particularly from the university's board of regents. As an example of the animosity, Morris wrote in North Toward Home that the university did not acknowledge his award of a Rhodes Scholarship with even as much as a letter of congratulation. Although Morris's contribution to the university continues to go unrecognized, in 1997 The Daily Texan began honoring each year's best editorial writer with "The Willie Morris Award for Editorial Excellence."

Morris graduated in 1956 and began studying history at Oxford University as a Rhodes Scholar. While at Oxford, Morris played for the Oxford University men's basketball team. In 1958 he married Celia Buchan of Houston, and in 1959 they had a son, David Rae. The next year they returned to the United States, where Morris became the editor of The Texas Observer, a liberal bi-weekly newspaper.

The marriage lasted 10 years, and Celia Morris writes about Willie and their divorce in her fourth book, Finding Celia's Place.

In 1963, Morris joined the staff of Harper's Magazine, in New York City, as associate editor, and in 1967 he was named editor-in-chief. In the same year he published North Toward Home, which became a bestseller and earned the Houghton Mifflin Literary Fellowship Award for non-fiction.

North Toward Home is an autobiographical account of his childhood in Yazoo City, Mississippi; early adulthood in Austin, Texas; and eventual move from the South to New York City. Critics cited the tender reflections on Southern smalltown culture, and the tone of those alienated expatriate Southerners who move north, but retain nostalgia for the South they left behind.

As the youngest-ever editor-in-chief of an influential literary magazine, Morris helped to launch the careers of notable writers such as William Styron and Norman Mailer. But the Cowles family, owners of Harper's Magazine, was perplexed by the content Morris published: longer articles of overtly liberal sentiment that offended cautious advertisers. Amidst falling ad sales, the Cowles family expressed their dissatisfaction with Morris until he resigned under pressure in 1971.

=== Move to Long Island ===
Following his resignation from Harper's, Morris moved to Bridgehampton, Long Island, where he lived for many years before returning to the South. During that time he became close friends with fellow writer James Jones, author of From Here to Eternity, and Jones's wife Gloria. Later, when his friend lay dying in Southampton Hospital of heart failure, Willie Morris took notes from Jones about his work-in-progress, the novel Whistle, which Morris finished for his friend Jones.

=== Return to Mississippi ===
In 1980, Morris returned to his native state to be writer-in-residence at the University of Mississippi in Oxford, Mississippi where he encouraged a new generation of Mississippi writers including John Grisham, who acknowledged auditing Morris's writing classes, as well as Peabody Award winning broadcaster Chris Berry (broadcaster) and Donna Tartt, who enrolled in the University of Mississippi in 1981, and whose writing caught the attention of Willie Morris when she was a freshman. Following the suggestion of Morris and others, she transferred to Bennington College in 1982. One of Morris' books, Good Old Boy: A Delta Boyhood was made into a TV movie for Public Television by Disney and PBS Wonderworks and later re-titled The River Pirates in 1988 not far from where Morris lived. It starred Richard Farnsworth, Maureen O'Sullivan, Dixie Wade, Ryan Francis, Caryn West and Richard E. Council. In 2000, My Dog Skip, another of Morris' books and an unofficial prequel to the earlier film, was made into a major motion picture starring Frankie Muniz, Diane Lane, Luke Wilson and Kevin Bacon. (Morris had previously written for Reader's Digest a profile of his dog 'Pete,' whom he had adopted while living in Bridgehampton, New York. When Morris left Bridgehampton, he took Pete, who had formerly belonged to the owner of a local service station and whom Willie referred to as 'the Mayor of Bridgehampton,' back to Mississippi with him. Later, after Pete's death, Morris requested and received permission from the Episcopal church for a burial of Pete. Morris died of a heart attack just before the movie debuted, after seeing an advance screening of the film and praising it. Morris was 64 years old at the time of his death.

Willie Morris is buried in Glenwood Cemetery in Yazoo City, close to the "grave" of the fictitious Witch of Yazoo, a character from one of Morris' books, Good Old Boy: A Delta Boyhood. In life he counted among his friends a wide circle, including Yazoo City childhood friends, well-known writers like Winston Groom (Forrest Gump), William Styron (Sophie's Choice), John Knowles (A Separate Peace), James Dickey (Deliverance) and Irwin Shaw (Rich Man, Poor Man), and Larry L. King ("The Best Little Whorehouse in Texas"). Morris invited Dickey and King to join him as Associate Editors of Harper's when he became editor. Morris and King wrote for the Texas Observer, the progressive voice of Texas in the mid 20th century.

Morris was revered by the students in his writing classes in Oxford. He was known as an unerring mimic with a warm sense of humor and a sense of the absurd.

Morris helped two Mississippi residents by giving them a second chance at sight by being an eye donor.

Morris appeared in Ken Burns's 1994 documentary Baseball.

Morris's letters to his son and many photographs are in the 2022 collection, David Rae Morris and Willie Morris, Love, Daddy: Letters From My Father.

== Willie Morris Award for Southern Fiction ==
Since 2007, Reba White Williams and Dave H. Williams have sponsored the Willie Morris Award for Southern Fiction. The award is given to a novel set in one of following Southern states: Alabama, Arkansas, Florida, Georgia, Kentucky, Louisiana, Mississippi, North Carolina, South Carolina, Tennessee, Texas, and Virginia, and which reflects the spirit of Morris's work. The novel should stand out for the quality of its prose, its originality, its sense of place and period, and the appeal of its characters.

An independent panel of judges votes on the award from books submitted for consideration. Recipients of the award to date:

- 2007: The King of Colored Town by Darryl Wimberley
- 2008: City of Refuge by Tom Piazza
- 2009: Secret Keepers by Mindy Friddle
- 2010: Crooked Letter, Crooked Letter by Tom Franklin
- 2011: If Jack's In Love by Stephen Wetta
- 2012: A Short Time to Stay Here by Terry Roberts
- 2013: Nowhere But Home by Liza Palmer
- 2014: Long Man by Amy Greene
- 2015: The Headmaster’s Darlings: A Mountain Brook Novel by Katherine Clark
- 2016: Last Ride to Graceland by Kim Wright
- 2017: One Good Mama Bone by Bren McClain
- 2018: The Past is Never by Tiffany Quay Tyson
- 2019: In West Mills by DeShawn Charles Winslow

== Bibliography ==
- My Dog Skip
- My Cat Spit McGee
- Faulkner's Mississippi
- Good Old Boy: A Delta Boyhood
- Good Old Boy and the Witch of Yazoo
- The Courting of Marcus Dupree, winner of a Christopher Award in 1984
- New York Days
- The Last of the Southern Girls
- My Mississippi
- Terrains of the Heart and Other Essays on Home
- Ghosts of Medgar Evers
- Homecomings
- South Today
- Always Stand in Against the Curve, and Other Sports Stories
- Yazoo: Integration in a Deep-Southern Town
- North Toward Home
- After All, It's Only a Game
- Prayer for the Opening of the Little League Season
- James Jones: A Friendship
- Taps

== External links and resources ==
- "A Tribute to Willie Morris," in The Southerner (1999), which includes Morris's essay, "Is There a South Anymore?"
- In Search of Willie Morris: The Mercurial Life of a Legendary Writer and Editor, by Larry L. King
- Diane Rehm (NPR) Interview with Larry L. King, author of Willie Morris biography
- Willie Morris,” by Jack Bales, Mississippi Writers Page, University of Mississippi.
- Conversations with Willie Morris, edited by Jack Bales
- Shifting Interludes: Selected Essays, by Willie Morris, edited by Jack Bales
- Willie Morris: An Exhaustive Annotated Bibliography and a Biography, by Jack Bales
- Willie Morris Collection (MUM00321) owned by the University of Mississippi Department of Archives and Special Collections.
- Michael Feldman Interview with Willie Morris, Whad'ya Know, 01/27/96
