= Stunt cock =

Prop used in pornographic films

A stunt cock is a substitute (sometimes prosthetic) penis that is used during filmmaking, typically in pornographic films. The stunt cock is typically filmed up close so as not to identify its bearer, the goal being to deceive the viewer into thinking that the stunt cock is the penis of the main actor.

== Usage ==
A common function of a stunt cock is to stand in for an actor who is unable to achieve erection or ejaculation so that filming can continue on schedule.

Stunt cocks have also appeared in non-pornographic films, such as Paul Thomas Anderson's Boogie Nights, the film Antichrist by Lars von Trier, in which one was used by actor Willem Dafoe., and were alleged to have been used by Vincent Gallo on the set of The Brown Bunny.
