= Enzo (dog) =

Canine actor (1995–2010)

- Species: Dog
- Breed: Jack Russell Terrier
- Sex: Male
- Born: July 1995
- Died: June 23, 2010 (aged 14)
- Occupation: Actor
- Notable role: Eddie in Frasier (80 episodes); Skip in My Dog Skip
- Years active: 1999–2004
- Owner: Mathilde de Cagny
- Parents: Moose; Chelsea Marvin

Enzo (July 1995 – June 23, 2010) was a Jack Russell Terrier canine actor who portrayed Eddie Crane on the American television sitcom Frasier. Eddie was originally portrayed by Enzo’s father, Moose; Enzo was one of a few puppies bred specifically as possible replacements for Moose, as it became clear that Frasier was a hit and would enjoy a long run. A daughter, Miko, was considered but never grew large enough (she was given to a technician); a son, Moosie, lived with Peri Gilpin, the actress who played Roz Doyle.

Enzo, born to mother Chelsea Marvin (also a Jack Russell), was a closer match and turned out to have unusually similar facial markings to his father. Later in the series, he was used as a stunt double to perform the more physically challenging tricks for his aging father. Enzo and Moose took turns playing the role after the eighth season. Enzo was also used as one of the puppies that "Eddie" had fathered during the show. Off the set, trainer Mathilde de Cagny has stated that Moose and Enzo's relationship was so bad that the two "could not stand to be in the same room together."

Enzo was cast as the title character in the feature film My Dog Skip. Moose played the older Skip in a few scenes. His trainer and several actors have commented on Enzo’s skill and trainability; he performed tricks and portrayed a wide variety of emotions. A 1999 interview quotes the director of My Dog Skip:

Skip never failed us. I wish I worked with actors who were as well prepared as Skip. There was not a trick or a piece of business we asked the dog to do that he wasn't able to do; it was uncanny. The trainers were so good, they could stop him on a mark, he could lift his leg, he could do a somersault. I expected to see him reading The New York Times any day.

Enzo died of cancer on June 23, 2010, at the age of 14 (incorrectly stated as 16).

== Filmography ==
- Frasier - Eddie
- My Dog Skip – Skip
- See Spot Run – Boodles

== See also ==
- List of individual dogs
