= My Dog Skip (film) =

2000 film directed by Jay Russell

- Theatrical release poster
- Directed by: Jay Russell
- Screenplay by: Gail Gilchriest
- Based on: My Dog Skip by Willie Morris
- Produced by: Mark Johnson; John Lee Hancock; Broderick Johnson; Andrew Kosove
- Starring: Frankie Muniz; Diane Lane; Luke Wilson; Kevin Bacon
- Cinematography: James L. Carter
- Edited by: Harvey Rosenstock; Gary Winter
- Music by: William Ross
- Production companies: Alcon Entertainment; MDS Productions LLC
- Distributed by: Warner Bros. (Note: Although the Warner Bros. Family Entertainment branding and logo appear on all promotional material, the logo doesn't appear in the film itself.)
- Release dates: January 8, 2000 (Premiere); January 12, 2000 (USA)
- Running time: 95 minutes
- Country: United States
- Language: English
- Budget: $7 million
- Box office: $35.8 million

My Dog Skip is a 2000 American comedy-drama film, directed by Jay Russell and starring Frankie Muniz, Diane Lane, Luke Wilson, and Kevin Bacon, with narration by Harry Connick Jr. Based on the 1995 autobiographical book by Willie Morris, the film tells the story of 9-year-old Morris as he is given a Jack Russell Terrier for his birthday and how the dog fundamentally changes several aspects of his life. My Dog Skip was released on January 12, 2000, by Warner Bros. and received generally positive reviews from critics. The film grossed $35.8 million on a $7 million budget.

== Plot ==
Willie Morris looks back on the early 1940s and how it was colored by his dog, a Smooth Fox Terrier named Skip. Willie is a lonely boy with a gruff, proud father, Jack, a Spanish Civil War veteran, and a charismatic, talkative mother, Ellen, a housewife, but he is an only child with few friends. His one companion is a man who lives next door, Dink Jenkins, who is the local sports hero in Mississippi. However, when Dink is drafted to go to war, Ellen decides to buy Willie a dog, against Jack's wishes, in order that he should have some company.

Willie and Skip became firm friends very quickly. However, Willie gets bullied at school by Big Boy Wilkinson, Henjie Henick, and Spit McGee, until Dink sends him a German helmet and belt from the front line. The other boys demand that he play ball in order to win back his belongings. The boys talk Willie into spending the night in a graveyard. If he stays there, he gets to join their gang and keep the ball Dink signed for them; otherwise, he has to give them his German helmet. Willie stays at the graveyard for hours until he hears two moonshiners, Millard and Junior, loading crates into a crypt. Junior captures them and threatens to kill Skip unless Willie stays until sunrise. After the two guys leave, the three boys return and accept Willie into their group as a reward.

Thanks to Skip, Willie now has three friends and a girlfriend, Rivers. Skip is there for him when Dink gets home, shell-shocked and a drunkard since being dishonorably discharged from the Army, presumably for desertion. However, when Willie's first ball game comes along, Skip and Willie have their first falling out. Dink agrees to come along but does not bother because, since the war, competitions do not interest him. Skip, wanting to cheer Willie up, runs onto the field and sits, refusing to leave. Angry and embarrassed by his poor performance at the game, causing his team to lose, Willie publicly hits Skip across the muzzle, and he disappears.

Unbeknownst to Willie, Skip has returned to the crypt and has been accidentally shut in the grave where moonshine is being stored. As Willie searches in the graveyard, he hears Skip's bark and runs to save him, but Junior knocks Skip out. Dink arrives and ejects the two moonshiners, and Skip recovers from his injuries.

When Willie leaves to go to Oxford University in the 1950s, Skip remains with Jack and Ellen and dies on Willie's bed, with Willie receiving a transantlantic call informing him of the death.

== Cast ==
- Enzo & Moose as Skip
  - Sweetie as a puppy Skip
- Frankie Muniz as Willie Morris
  - Michael Berkshire as Older Willie
- Diane Lane as Ellen Morris
- Luke Wilson as Dink Jenkins
- Kevin Bacon as Jack Morris
- Caitlin Wachs as Rivers Applewhite
- Peter Crombie as Junior Smalls
- Clint Howard as Millard
- Bradley Coryell as Big Boy Wilkinson
  - James Thweat as Older Big Boy
- Daylan Honeycutt as Henjie Henick
  - Josh Yates as Older Henjie
- Cody Linley as Spit McGee
  - Wayne Wimberly as Older Spit
- Harry Connick Jr. as Adult Willie (voice)
- Mark Beech as Army Buddy
- Susan Carol Davis as Mrs. Jenkins
- David Pickens as Mr. Jenkins
- Lucile Doan Ewing as Aunt Maggie
- Nathaniel Lee Jr., as Sammy
- John Stiritz as Grandpa Percy
- Thomas Sellers as Patron at the Baseball Game

== Production ==
Principal photography took place in Canton and Yazoo City, Mississippi, from May 10 to June 23, 1998.

The author of the book, Willie Morris, suffered from a heart attack right after the film was completed in 1999. Morris saw a preliminary screening of the film in New York and praised it as "an absolute classic." Morris died a couple of days later and never saw the final version. The film is dedicated to his memory.

== Release ==
The film was theatrically released on January 12, 2000, by Warner Bros. in 5 theaters. It expanded to 2,331 theaters on March 3, 2000.

My Dog Skip won the Broadcast Film Critics Award for "Best Family Film" for the year 2000, the Silver Medal Giffoni Film Festival Award, the Best Cast Young Star Awards, the Silver Angel Awards winner, the ArkTrust Genesis Award, and the Christopher Award for Best Family Film.

=== Home media ===
My Dog Skip was released on DVD and VHS on July 11, 2000, by Warner Home Video. The film was released on Blu-ray on January 4, 2011, by Warner Home Video.

The film opened at number 52 at the US box office with a gross of $62,633 in its opening five days. On its wide release, it moved up to number three at the US box office, with a gross of $5.9 million. It ended up grossing $34 million in the United States and Canada and $35.8 million worldwide, recouping its $7 million budget. It was also Warner Bros.'s first family film to be a success since Space Jam in 1996. The film was ranked at number four of Variety's "dollar for dollar" most profitable films of the year 2000.

The movie remained in Variety's Top Ten video sales charts for five months after its video release.

== Reception ==
=== Critical response ===
Rotten Tomatoes gave the film a score of 73% from 82 critics. The site's consensus states: "Critics say My Dog Skip is cute, wholesome entertainment for the family. It's especially designed to appeal to your sentiment, but you might find yourself choking up just the same." Metacritic gave the film a score of 61 based on 26 reviews, indicating "generally favorable reviews".

Roger Ebert gave the film 3 out of 4 stars. In his review he called My Dog Skip: "Sentimental but not sappy, clever but not contrived."

A. O. Scott of The New York Times wrote in his review: "Just as Skip is an old-fashioned, flesh-and-blood dog, My Dog Skip is a resolutely old-fashioned movie: a relaxed, modest evocation of the mythology of small-town mid-20th-century American childhood, with its lazy summers, its front porches and picket fences, and its fat-tired, chromed-plated bicycles."

== Awards ==
Angel Awards 2001

Award	Category	Nominee
Silver Angel	Feature Film	Nominated

Broadcast Film Critics Association Awards 2001

Award	Category	Nominee
Critics Choice Award	Best Family Film	Won

Christopher Awards 2000

Award	Category	Nominee	Result
Christopher Award	Feature Film	Jay Russell (director) and Alcon Entertainment (production company)	Won

Giffoni Film Festival 2000

Award	Category	Nominee	Result
Bronze Gryphon and Silver Gryphon	Free to Fly Section - Best Actor and Free to Fly Section	Frankie Muniz and Jay Russell	Won

Las Vegas Film Critics Society Awards 2000

Award	Category	Nominee	Result
Sierra Award	Youth in Film	Frankie Muniz	Nominated

YoungStar Awards 2000

Award	Category	Nominee	Result
YoungStar Award	Best Young Actor/Performance in a Motion Picture Drama	Frankie Muniz	Nominated

Young Artist Awards 2001

Award	Category	Nominee	Result
Young Artist Award	Best Ensemble in a Feature Film and Best Family Feature Film - Drama	Frankie Muniz, Cody Linley, Bradley Coryell, Daylan Honeycutt and Caitlin Wachs	Won
Young Artist Award	Best Performance in a Feature Film - Supporting Young Actress	Caitlin Wachs	Nominated

== Soundtrack ==
- "Tuxedo Junction" - Performed by Gene Krupa and His Orchestra
- "Ration Blues" - Performed by Louis Jordan and his Tympany Five
- "Old Yazoo" - Performed by The Boswell Sisters
- "I'm Beginning to See the Light" - Performed by Harry James
- "Hot Time in the Town of Berlin" - Performed by The Andrews Sisters
- "Lullaby of Broadway" - Performed by Richard Himber & His Orchestra
- "Chasing Shadows" - Performed by Louis Prima
- "Moonlight Promenade" - Performed by William Ross
- "Starlight Serenade" - Performed by William Ross
- "The Round Up Prelude" - Performed by William Ross
- "Hop-Along" - Performed by William Ross
- "200 Bright" - Performed by William Ross
- "Washington in the New" - Performed by William Ross
