= Southern Spaces =

- Discipline: Area studies on the Southern United States
- Language: English
- Edited by: Allen Tullos

Publication details
- History: 2004–present
- Publisher: Emory Center for Digital Scholarship, Emory University (United States)
- Open access: Yes

Standard abbreviations
- ISO 4: South. Spaces

Indexing
- ISSN: 1551-2754

Links
- Journal homepage; Online access

Southern Spaces is a peer-reviewed open-access academic journal that publishes articles, photo essays and images, presentations, and short videos about real and imagined spaces and places of the Southern United States and their connections to the wider world. The intended audience includes researchers and teachers, students in and out of classrooms, library patrons, and the general public.

A multimedia digital publication, Southern Spaces encourages the representation and analysis of many souths and southern regions, the critical scrutiny of any monolithic "South", the discovery of time-space relationships, and the mapping of expressive cultural forms associated with place. The journal covers areas such as geography, southern studies, regional studies, women's studies, queer studies, public health, and African American, Native American, and American studies.

Southern Spaces is published by the Emory Center for Digital Scholarship of Emory University in Georgia, United States.
