= Tidewater region of North Carolina =

Section of land along the coast of North Carolina near the Atlantic ocean

The Tidewater Region is the slim section of land along the coast of North Carolina near the Atlantic ocean. All the beaches of North Carolina are located here. There are also capes, (projections of land into water) on the coast of North Carolina. Lighthouses, normally found on a cape, reduce incidents of a collision between ships and the coast. The major streams and rivers from Piedmont, United States area empty into sounds or the Atlantic Ocean. The Tidewater has eight sounds: Back, Pamlico, Albemarle, Currituck, Croatan, Roanoke, Core, and Bogue Sounds. It has many wetlands, where water covers the land. The Great Dismal Swamp, which is a series of swamps scattered from Virginia to North Carolina, is North Carolina's largest wetland area. It covers approximately 111,000 acres (450 km^{2}), which makes it one of the largest swamps in the country. The Tidewater area in North and South Carolina is the only place in the world where the Venus flytrap grows naturally.

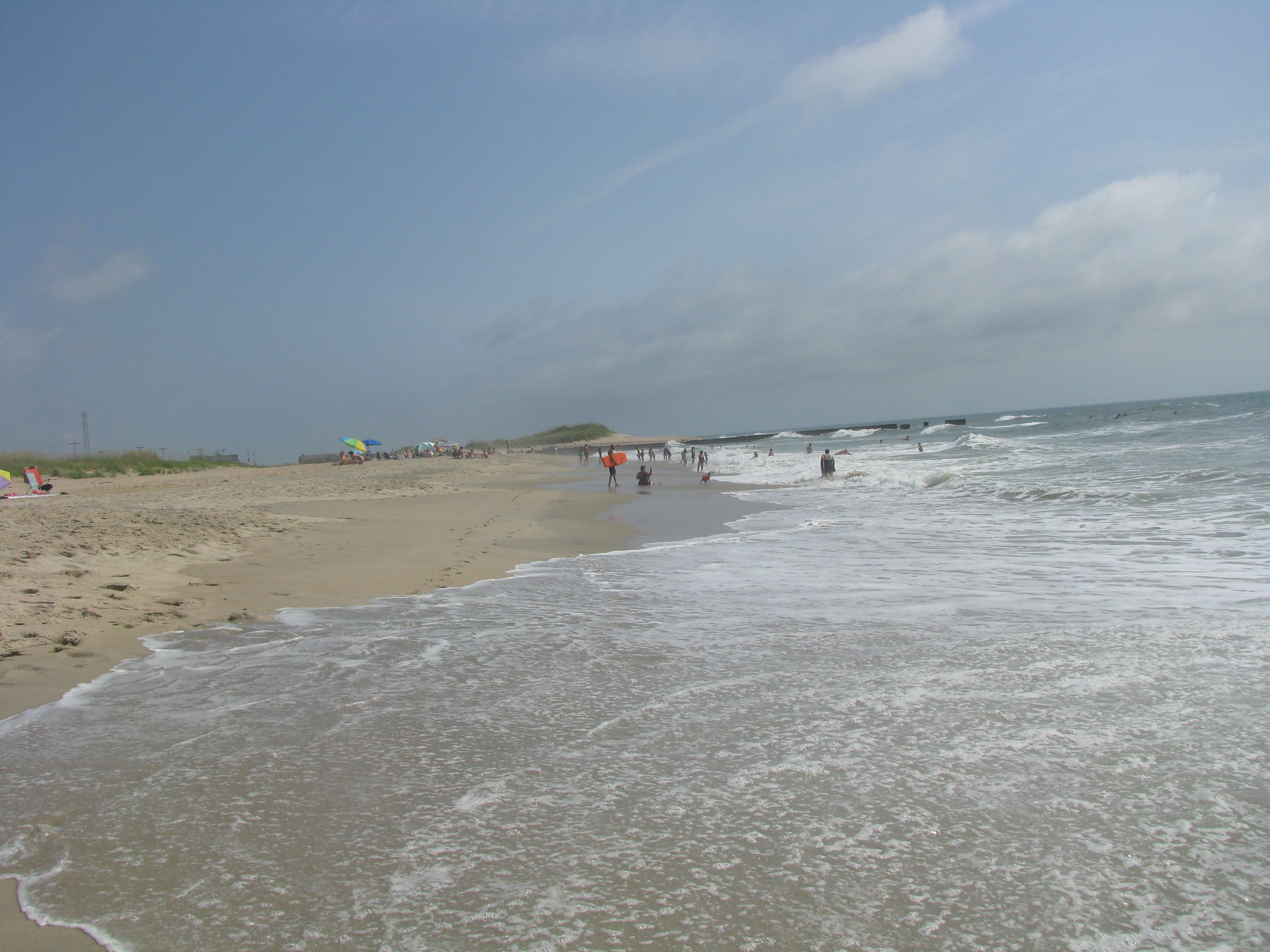
The beach adjacent to the Cape Hatteras Lighthouse, looking north

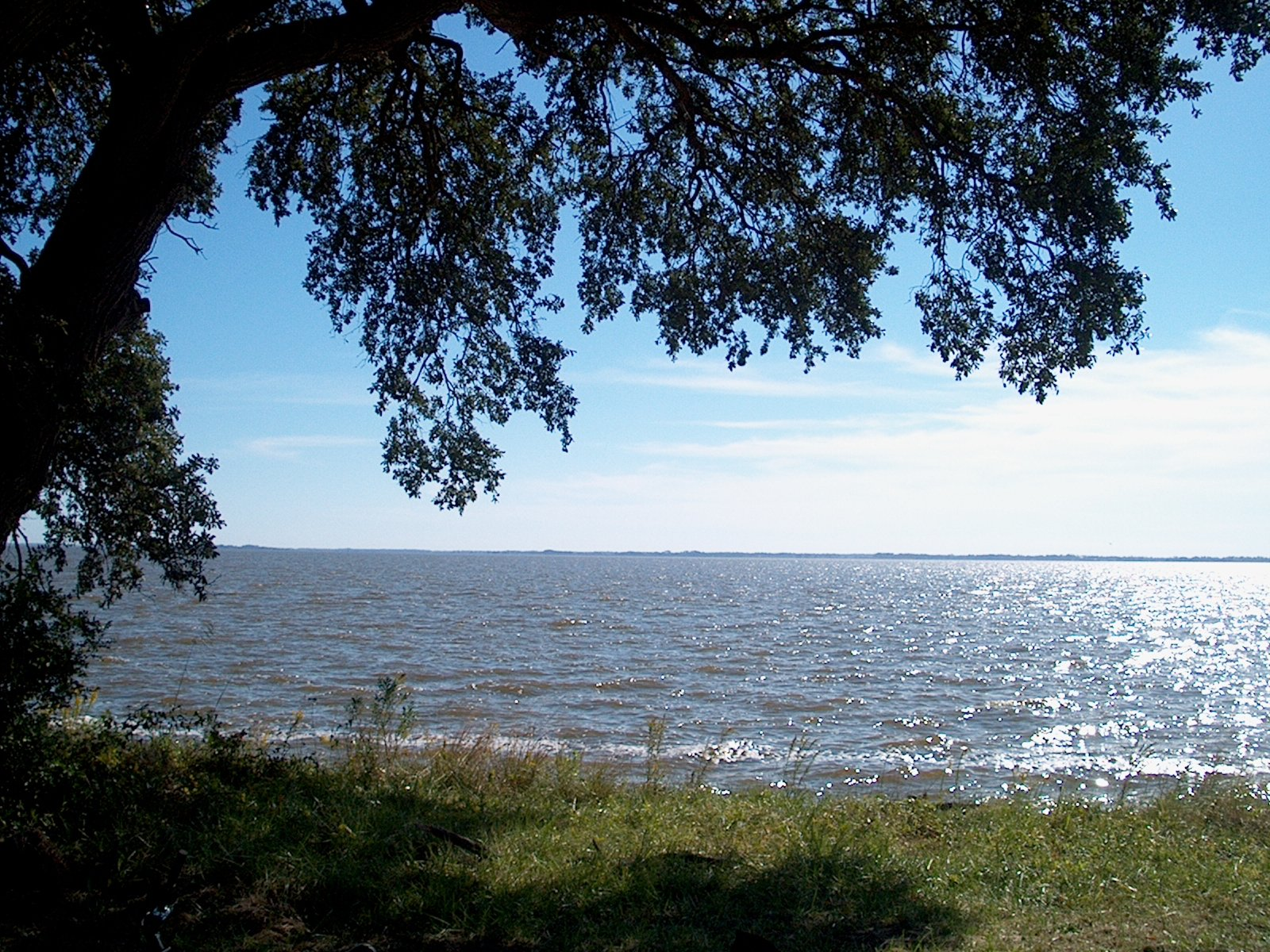
Currituck Sound as seen from Knotts Island

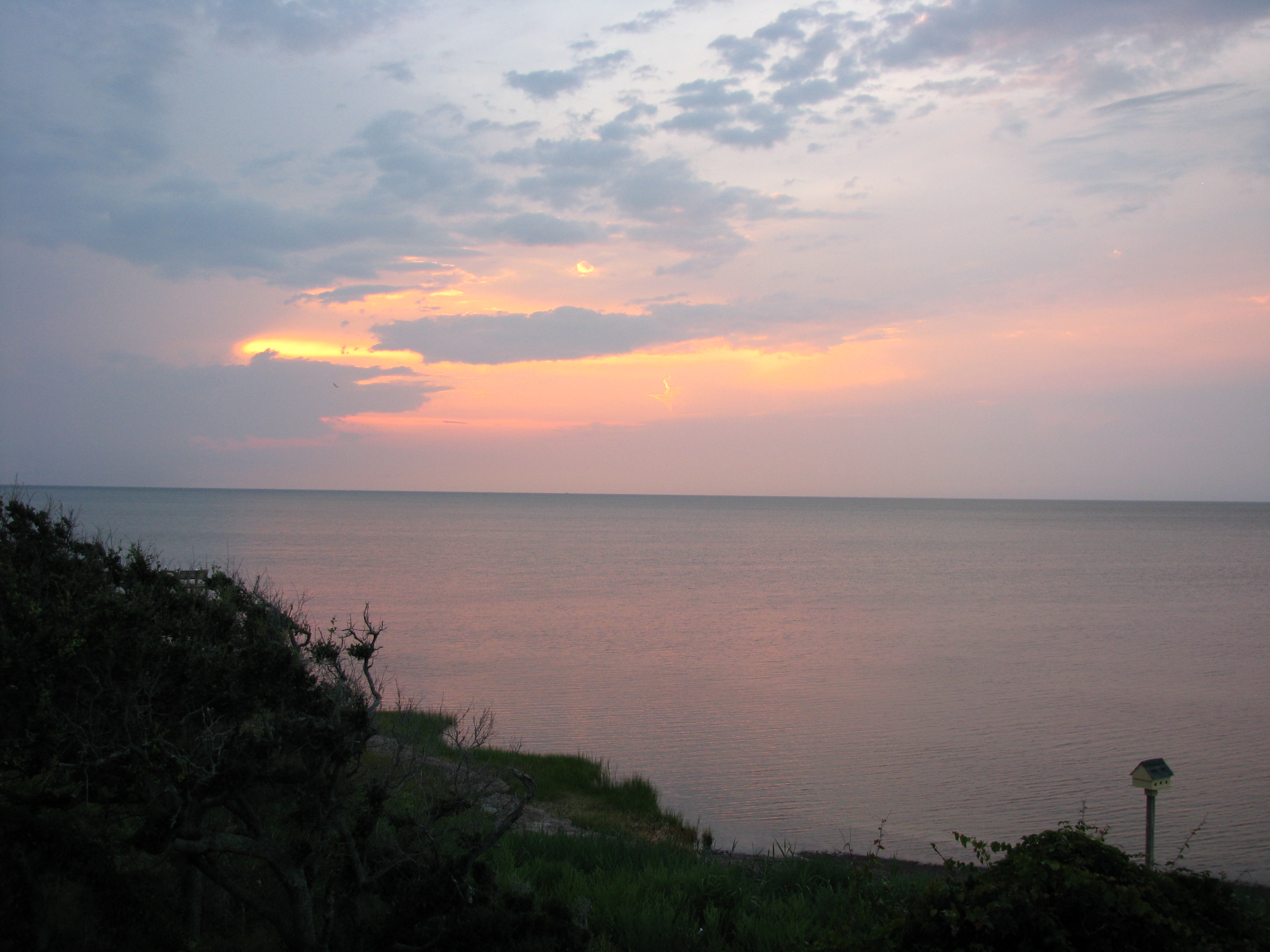
A sunset on Pamlico Sound as seen from The Inn on Pamlico Sound in Buxton, North Carolina

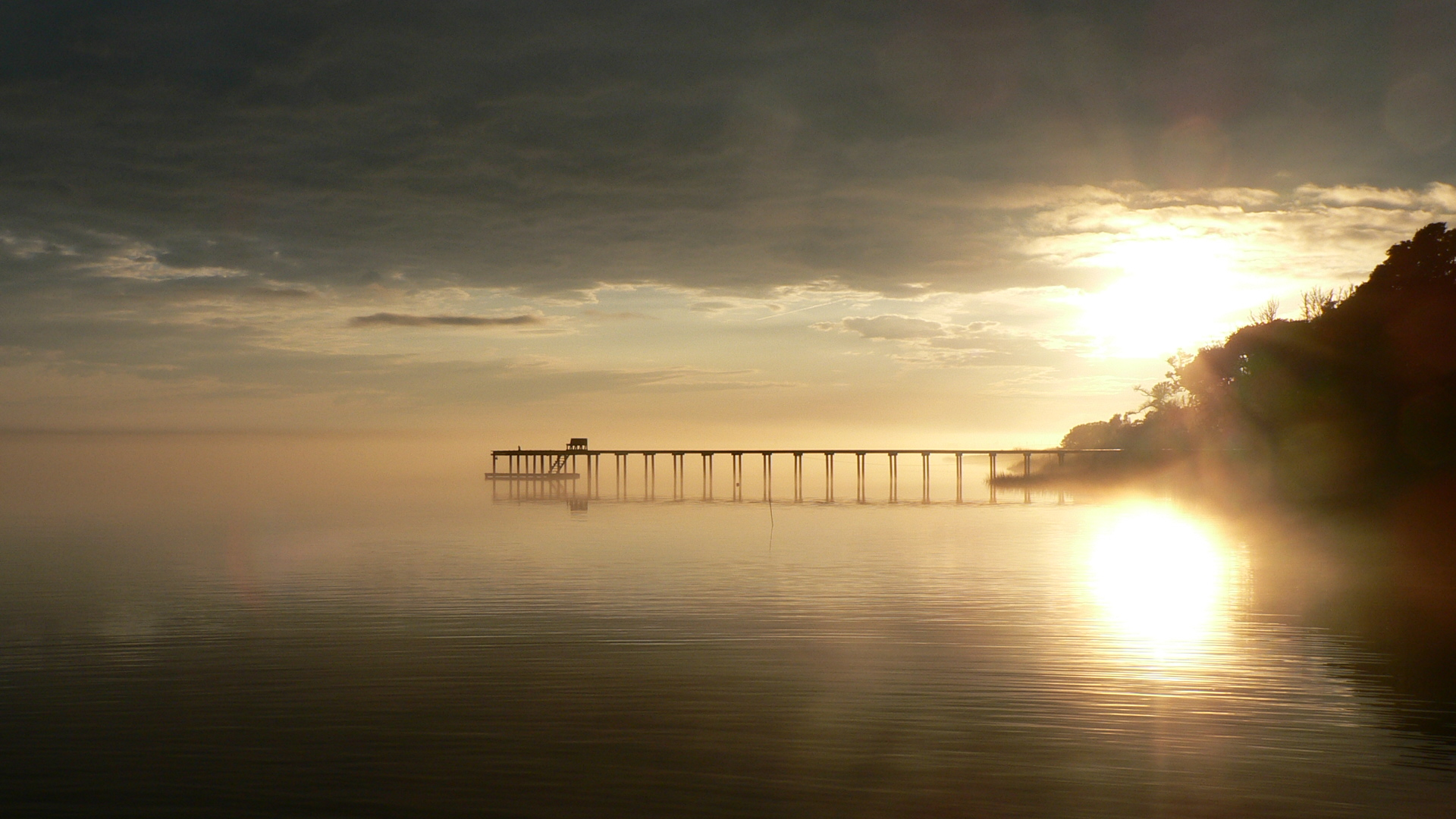
Bogue Sound with fog at sunset

== Tidewater Research Station ==
The Tidewater Research Station, which was established in 1943 in Washington County, was made to serve a large area of North Carolina lying between the coastal plain region and North Carolina's coast. It replaced the Blackland Test Farm near Wenona, which was established in 1912. Agriculture in the Tidewater region has expanded rapidly during the past 35 years. Much land clearing and drainage happened in the Tidewater from the 1950s to the 1980s, thus increasing the need for research. The station focuses on research that involves grain and pig production— the biggest focus of agriculture in the area. The station has 1,558 acres (6.31 km^{2}) (840 woodland, 428 cropland, 195 pastures, and 95 ponds, buildings, roads, and related areas).
