= Moose (dog) =

Canine actor (1990–2006)

- Moose on the cover of Entertainment Weekly
- Species: Canis familiaris
- Breed: Jack Russell Terrier
- Sex: Male
- Born: December 24, 1990; Florida, United States
- Died: June 22, 2006 (aged 15); West Los Angeles, California, United States
- Nationality: American
- Occupation: Actor
- Notable role: Eddie Crane in Frasier; Old Skip in My Dog Skip
- Years active: 1993–2003
- Owner: Mathilde de Cagny
- Offspring: Enzo; Moosie; Miko
- Weight: 15 lb (7 kg)

Moose (December 24, 1990 – June 22, 2006) was a wire-hair Jack Russell Terrier who portrayed Eddie Crane on the American television sitcom Frasier.

== Early life ==
Moose was birthed on Christmas Eve, 1990, in Florida, the youngest littermate. He was the largest puppy in the litter. Like Pal, the original Lassie, the rambunctious puppy was too much for his original owner. According to an article by Lori Golden:

In fact, chasing cats was one of the activities that led to this troubled terrier becoming one of TV’s most precious pooches. Originally owned by a Florida family, Sam and Connie Thise, Moose was too hard to handle. He could not be house trained; he chewed everything; he dug and barked a lot; and he was constantly escaping and climbing trees. Eventually given to the Florida manager of Birds and Animals Unlimited, a company that trains animals for TV and motion pictures, Moose was put on a plane at 2½ years old and sent to Mathilde de Cagny, an LA trainer working for the show-biz animal company.

== Career ==
Moose won the role on Frasier after only six months of training. Moose had the ability to fix Kelsey Grammer with a long hard stare; this became a running sight gag on the show. When Moose had to lick his co-stars, however, sardine oil was applied upon the actors' faces. John Mahoney once revealed liver pâté was dabbed behind the actors' ears to make Moose nuzzle the actors.

Moose had numerous television appearances and several magazine covers to his credit. There is an official Moose calendar and an "autobiography", My Life as a Dog, which was written by Brian Hargrove, husband of actor David Hyde Pierce who portrays Niles Crane in Frasier.

== Retirement ==
Moose spent the last six and a half years of his life in retirement in West Los Angeles with son Enzo , who inherited the role in the interim, their trainer Mathilde de Cagny, her husband Michael Halberg, and Jill, the dog from As Good as It Gets. He died of natural causes at home at the age of 15 (incorrectly stated as 16) on June 22, 2006.

== Selected credits ==
- Universal Studios Animal Actors’ Showcase
- Coach print advertisements (National campaign)
- Rold Gold Pretzel TV commercials
- Frasier – "Eddie" (1993–2000)
- My Dog Skip – Skip (2000)

== See also ==
- List of individual dogs
