= Red dog =

Red dog or Red Dog may refer to:

== Animals ==
- Dhole, a canid species also called the red dog or Asiatic wild dog
- Red Dog (Pilbara), a dog which travelled Western Australia in the 1970s and inspired the novel Red Dog and the related film franchise

== Entertainment and media ==
=== Characters ===
- Red Dog (G.I. Joe), a fictional character in the G.I. Joe universe
- Red Dog, a canine character in the Red Dog film series played by the Australian canine film actor Koko and that is based on the Pilbara wanderer.
- Clifford (character), the centerpiece of the Clifford the Big Red Dog franchise

=== Films ===
- Rustlers of Red Dog, 1935 film
- Red Dog (film), a 2011 film adapted from de Bernières' novel
  - Red Dog: True Blue, a prequel to the 2011 film
  - Koko: A Red Dog Story, a spin-off documentary about the star of the 2011 film, Koko

=== Games ===
- Red dog (card game), a card game found in some casinos
- Red Dog: Superior Firepower, a Dreamcast Vehicular combat game style shooter

=== Literature ===
- Red Dog (novel), a short novel by Louis de Bernières
- "Red Dog" (Kipling short story), a Mowgli story by Rudyard Kipling
- Red Dog (short story collection), a short story (and collection of anecdotes and poetry) by Nancy Gillespie

=== Music ===
- The Legendary Red Dog, nickname of Joseph L. Campbell, roadie for The Allman Brothers Band

== People ==
- James Allen Red Dog (1954–1993), American serial killer
- Ion Antonescu (1882–1946), Romanian marshal and dictator nicknamed Câinele Roșu (The Red Dog)
- Don Ettinger (1921–1992), American footballer nicknamed "Red Dog"

== Places ==
- Red Dog Airport
- Red Dog Saloon, a bar in Juneau, Alaska
- Red Dog Saloon (Virginia City, Nevada), a bar that played an important role in the history of the psychedelic music scene
- Manuwarra Red Dog Highway, currently under construction
- Red Dog, California, a mining ghost town
- Red Dog mine
- Red Dog Mine, Alaska, a census-designated place

== Sports ==
- Red dog (American football), a strategy of sending a player on a full-out defensive rush, known in the modern era as a blitz.
- Red Dogs, the name given to fans of the Romanian football team FC Dinamo București
- Redd Dogg, a ring name used by professional wrestler Rodney Begnaud
- NASCAR Xfinity Series at Charlotte (spring race), previously known as "Red Dog 300"
- Myrtle Beach 250, previously known as "Red Dog 250"

== Other uses ==
- Microsoft Azure, cloud computing platform previously codenamed "Red Dog"
- Operation Red Dog, a planned invasion of Dominica, organized by American and Canadian Ku Klux Klan leaders in concert with former prime minister Patrick John
- Red Dog (beer), an inexpensive beer produced by the Plank Road Brewery (Miller Brewing Co.)
- Red dog (coal slag), a byproduct of coal mining
