= Uggie =

Dog actor

- Uggie on The Ellen DeGeneres Show in 2012
- Species: Canis familiaris
- Breed: Parson Russell Terrier
- Sex: Male
- Born: February 14, 2002
- Died: August 7, 2015 (aged 13); Los Angeles, California, U.S.
- Occupation: Actor
- Years active: 2004–15
- Known for: The Artist and Water for Elephants
- Owner: Omar von Muller
- Weight: 16 lb (7.3 kg)
- Appearance: White and tan
- Awards: 2011 Palm Dog Award; 2012 Golden Collar Award; 2020 Palm Dog of Palm Dogs (posthumously)

Uggie (February 14, 2002 – August 7, 2015) was a trained Parson Russell Terrier famous for his roles in Water for Elephants and The Artist. His memoir Uggie, My Story was published in the United States, the UK, and France in October 2012.

The campaign "Consider Uggie" was launched in December 2011 on Facebook by S.T. VanAirsdale, an editor at Movieline, for Uggie to receive a real or Honorary Academy Award nomination. BAFTA announced that he would be ineligible for one of its awards, while he received a special mention at the Lumière Awards in France. He won the Palm Dog Award at the 2011 Cannes Film Festival.

== Early life and family ==
Uggie was rejected by at least his first two owners as being too wild. He was about to be sent to a dog pound, but was adopted by animal trainer Omar Von Muller after his friends alerted him to the dog. Von Muller intended only to foster the dog while he found him a new home, but decided that Uggie should stay. He said of the dog, "He was a crazy, very energetic puppy, and who knows what would have happened to him if he [had] gone to the dog pound. But he was very smart and very willing to work. One of the most important thing[s] is that he was not afraid of things. That is what makes or breaks a dog in the movies, whether they are afraid of lights, and noises and being on sets. He gets rewards, like sausages, to encourage him to perform, but that is only a part of it. He works hard." When not working, Uggie lived in North Hollywood with Von Muller, Von Muller's wife and Von Muller's daughter. There were six other dogs in the household, all of whom work in the film industry.

== Career ==
Uggie's earliest roles were in commercials and minor roles in the films What's Up Scarlett, Wassup Rockers (2005) and Mr. Fix It (2006) alongside David Boreanaz. His first named role, and big break, was as "Queenie" in the romantic drama Water for Elephants, alongside actors Robert Pattinson and Reese Witherspoon. He appeared in "The Incredible Dog Show" from August 2010 onwards, a tour of dogs with different tricks, which toured the United States and South America; his trick was riding a skateboard.

He went on to appear in the 2011 silent movie The Artist, and it was this role which brought him to the attention of mass media, with some critics describing him as "stealing every scene". He had two stunt doubles in the film, named Dash and Dude, who were colored to look more like Uggie, but Uggie did most of his own stunts and the doubles were barely required. Uggie and his trainers for the film, Sarah Clifford and Omar Muller, spent three days with the film's star Jean Dujardin to teach the French actor the verbal commands and hand signals Uggie needed in a scene. Because it was a silent film, the trainers could also call out commands while the film was rolling.

He attended the American Film Institute premiere of the film and walked the red carpet along with the rest of the cast. Uggie promoted the film on a week-long promotional tour, appearing on television shows in the UK, including The Graham Norton Show. He also appeared at a charity screening in London's West End, in aid of Dogs Trust. Uggie appeared opposite another Jack Russell terrier named Cosmo from Mike Mills' Beginners in a photoshoot spread for The Hollywood Reporter. He also appeared in other photoshoots for W magazine and The Hollywood Reporter. During the "Consider Uggie" campaign, an official Twitter account was set up in his name.

Trainer von Muller said that Uggie was approaching retirement and that he wouldn't want him to have to go through the same long hours that the dog experienced while filming The Artist again, but would be willing to let Uggie take other less intense jobs. On February 8, 2012, Uggie was named as Nintendo's first-ever spokesdog. He helped promote their 3DS video game Nintendogs + Cats during Responsible Pet Ownership Month. Later that year he became a spokesdog for PETA in an ad campaign that encouraged potential dog owners to adopt from shelters. Uggie made a cameo appearance in the 2012 comedy film The Campaign, his final film role before retirement.

=== "Consider Uggie" ===
After The Artist received critical acclaim sufficient to suggest that the film might have a real chance of winning "Best Picture" awards, S.T. VanAirsdale, an editor at Movieline, began a campaign called "Consider Uggie" on Facebook to seek recognition for Uggie's performance; he felt that the dog outperformed Leonardo DiCaprio's performance in J. Edgar, but probably wasn't as good as George Clooney in The Descendants. However, a precedent was set for the Oscars in 1929 at the 1st Academy Awards when German Shepherd dog actor Rin Tin Tin, according to legend, gained the most votes for the Award for Best Actor. Actor Emil Jannings was actually presented with the award on the night.

Cast and crew on The Artist responded to the campaign, with James Cromwell supporting the move to ensure Uggie was recognized, saying he was "wonderfully trained and talented" and supporting the move to install a special Oscar for animals in film. The Daily Telegraph endorsed the campaign, believing that a win for Uggie at the Oscars would be a win for all canine film stars, such as Fox Terrier Asta, and Terry, the Cairn Terrier who portrayed Toto in The Wizard of Oz.

The British Academy of Film and Television Arts responded: "Regretfully, we must advise that as he is not a human being and as his unique motivation as an actor was sausages, Uggie is not qualified to compete for the BAFTA in this category." This was after a number of members had contacted BAFTA to inquire if they were allowed to vote for Uggie for Best Actor.

== Awards ==
Uggie won the Palm Dog Award for best performance by a canine at the 2011 Cannes Film Festival, for his role as "Jack" in The Artist. It was the 11th year in which the award was handed out and goes to the best canine performance. Following the "Consider Uggie" campaign, Jone Bauman of the American Humane Association said Uggie was in line for a Pawscar, the association's awards for animals in films.

He has also received a special mention at the Lumière Awards, the French equivalent of the Golden Globes. Uggie and Cosmo shared the prize for "Best performance by an animal", awarded by The Seattle Times movie critic Moira Macdonald.

On February 13, 2012, Uggie was named Best Dog in a Theatrical Film at the first Golden Collar Awards, awarded by Dog News Daily. The awards were only launched a couple of months previously due to the attention Uggie was getting for his performance in The Artist.

On June 25, 2012, he had his paw prints placed in cement at Grauman's Chinese Theatre.

== Death ==
Uggie was euthanized at the age of 13 on August 7, 2015, after developing a prostate tumor.

== Filmography ==
Year	Film	Role	Awards
2005	What's Up Scarlett	uncredited	
2005	Wassup Rockers	Biting Dog	
2006	Mr. Fix It	The Terrier	
2011	Water for Elephants	Queenie	
2011	The Artist	The Dog	Hollywood Walk of Fame; American Humane Association for Association's Award; Cannes Film Festival Palm Dog Award; Golden Collar Award for Best Dog in a Theatrical Film; Prix Lumière Special Mention; The Seattle Times for Best Performance by an Animal (awarded by critic Moira Macdonald)
2012	The Campaign	Himself	
2012	Key & Peele	Racist Dog	
2013	Holiday Road Trip	Scoots	

== See also ==
- List of individual dogs
