= Nelson Woss =

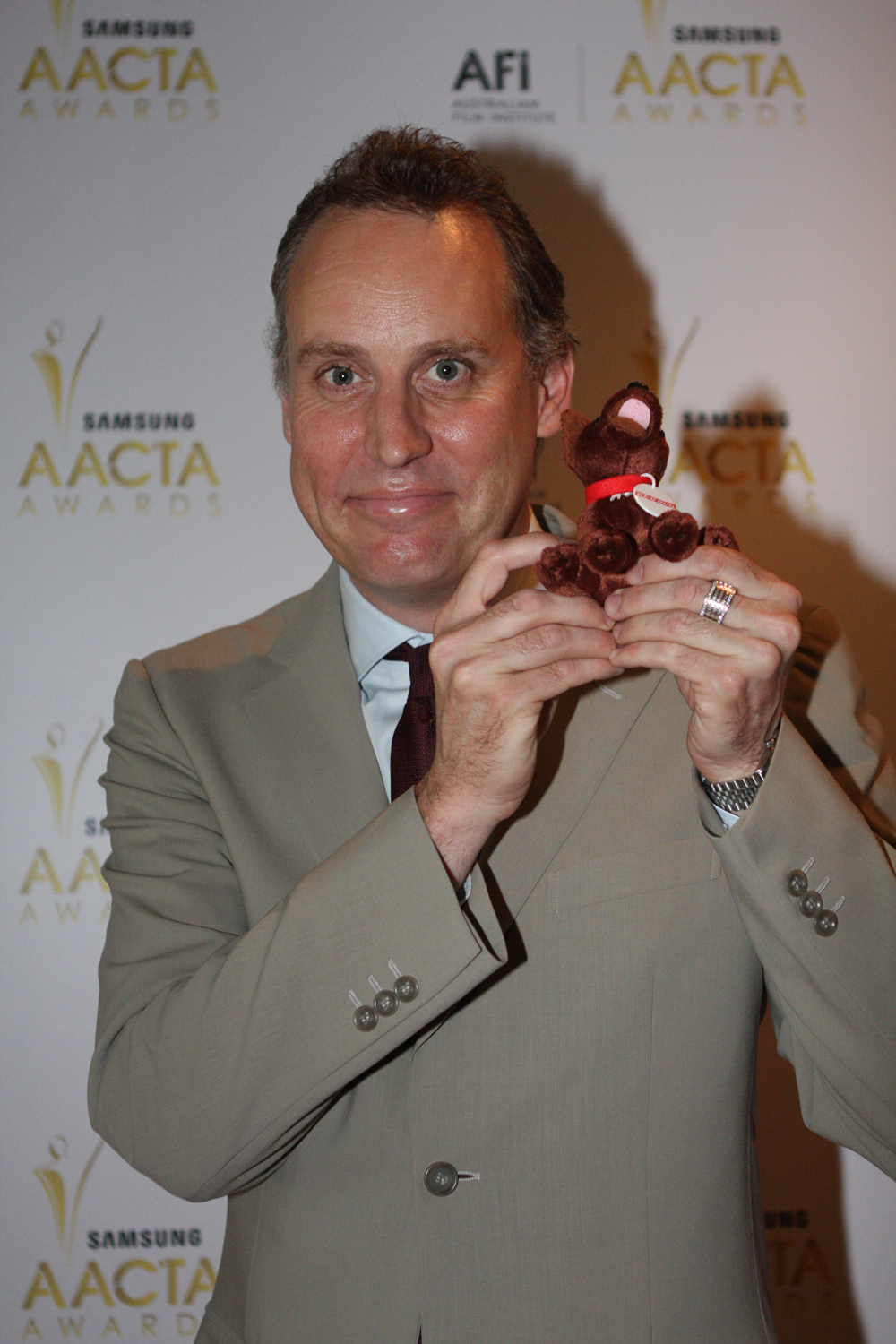
Nelson Woss at the 1st AACTA Awards 2012

Nelson Woss (born in Perth, Western Australia) is an Australian film producer who made the feature films Red Dog and Ned Kelly.

== Career ==
After graduating from Christ Church Grammar School, Nelson Woss attended the University of Western Australia before completing his education at Babson College in the United States.

He first worked in the film industry at Village Roadshow in Los Angeles. Woss then worked for director Ivan Reitman's company Northern Lights, which, at the time, was based at Universal Pictures.

In 2000, Woss set up his own independent production company, Endymion Films Inc, and executive produced the feature film Venus & Mars.

Woss also developed and produced the screenplay for the hit computer game Abuse, which was marketed around the world.

In 2002, Woss developed and produced the Australian feature film Ned Kelly for Universal Pictures.

Woss produced the highly successful Australian feature film Red Dog. The film has made more than A$21 million at the Australian box office since opening in August 2011. Red Dog is the eighth-highest grossing Australian film of all time and 11 days after opening, Red Dog became the highest grossing Australian film of 2011.

In January 2012, Red Dog won Best Film at the 1st AACTA Awards and the AFI Members Choice award.

Red Dog was officially released on DVD, Blu-ray and download on 1 December 2011 in Australia. The Red Dog DVD is the biggest-selling Australian DVD of all time. The DVD is also the third-highest selling DVD of all time in Australia behind Avatar (first) and Finding Nemo (second).

A deal with Roadshow Entertainment and Coles saw one dollar from the sale of every DVD sold in Coles during December 2011 donated to the RSPCA. More than $17,000 was raised for the animal charity. In February 2012 Woss and Koko, the canine star of Red Dog, visited RSPCA to present a cheque for the money raised.

In March 2012, it was announced that Woss was working with Australian theatre producer John Frost to adapt Red Dog into a stage musical.

Woss is president of Endymion Films Inc. and its Australian counterpart Woss Group Film Productions.

Woss lives in Perth, Western Australia. Up until his death in December 2012, Koko (dog) the canine star of Red Dog also lived with Woss. The two were inseparable and Woss was reportedly devastated when Koko died.

Woss and Koko were the subject of a portrait by acclaimed Australian artist Adam Cullen. The painting was a finalist for the 2012 Archibald Prize.

In 2015 Woss teamed up with director Kriv Stenders (Red Dog), (Kill Me Three Times) and writer Dan Taplitz (Red Dog) to produce Red Dog: True Blue, a prequel to Red Dog.

Red Dog: True Blue was theatrically released in 2017. The film grossed over AUD8M at the Australian box office and has become a perennial family film. It has been distributed around the world and won the Grand Prize at the 2012 Heartland Film Festival

In 2014 Woss set up a new company, Good Dog Distribution, to jointly distribute Red Dog: True Blue along with Roadshow Distribution.

In 2019, Woss produced an ultra-low budget mockumentary about his dog. Koko (dog).

Koko: A Red Dog Story was theatrically released in Australia and has become a cult film. Audiences often can not agree whether the story portrayed is based on truth or fiction.
