= Chinir saaj =

Bangladeshi traditional confectionery

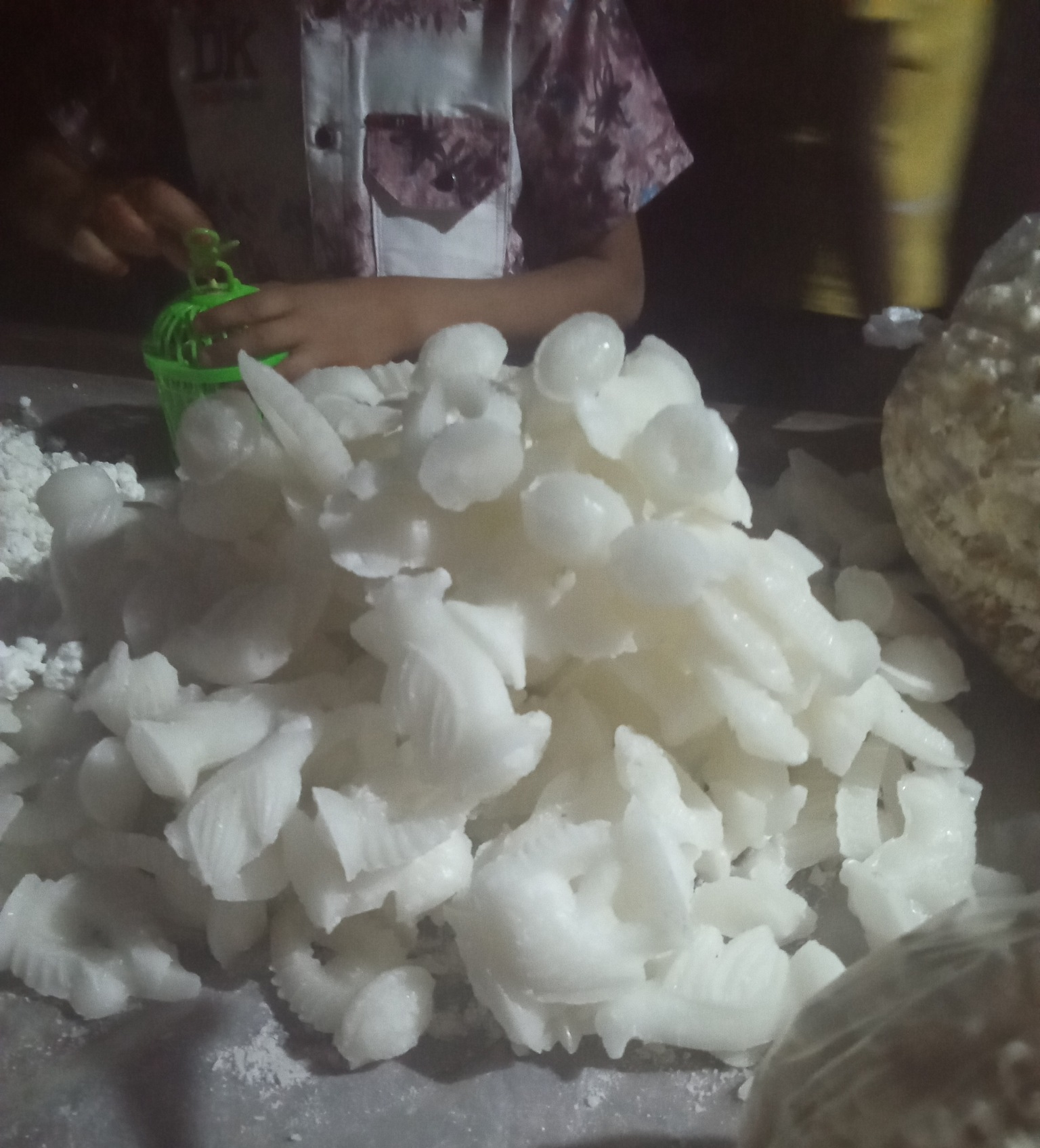
- Chinir Saaj kept for sale in a village fair at Kushtia, Bangladesh
- Place of origin: Bangladesh
- Main ingredients: sugar

Chinir saaj aka Saaj and Chinir chaanch (Bengali: চিনির সাজ, সাজ বা ছাঁচ) is a dry sweet made from sugar which is commonly made in northern regions of Bangladesh.

== Description ==
Saaj is a dry and white confection, prepared in frames. It is made in shapes of animals such as: elephants, horses, fish, birds etc. Usually, some other traditional sweetmeats e.g., Batasa, Kadma are made and sold along with saaj in rural events, festivals, village fairs and markets of Northern Bangladesh.

== History ==
The word saaj is possibly derived from the Bengali word chaanch (Bengali: ছাঁচ), meaning "mold" or "shape". In Saturia, Manikganj, confectioners have been producing saaj as an ancestral trade for 150 years. It is also reported that Mymensing was once known for its production.

== Recipe ==
Only sugar is used in making saaj. Sugar syrup is made by burning sugar water in a specially made pot. It is then poured into wooden frames of various attractive shapes. After waiting to cool it down, the saaj is brought out. It takes about 10 minutes to make saaj from the mold.

== Availability and production ==
Saaj is popular as a sweet in different regions of Bangladesh. Various districts including Mymensingh, Manikganj and some other northern districts have a tradition of its production. Chinir saaj was once very popular usually in Boishakhi fair (Fair on Bengali New Year) and other village fairs.

Making saaj is a family business to its confectioners. Many have been involved in the production of saaj, batasa, kodma etc. for generations.

New generations of confectioners are discouraged in producing saaj for its low profit. Again, the popularity of chocolates and other confections has narrowed the scope of its production.
