= Mr. Fix It (2006 film) =

- Directed by: Darin Ferriola
- Written by: Darin Ferriola
- Produced by: Jeff Ritchie; Darin Ferriola
- Starring: David Boreanaz; Alana De La Garza; Scoot McNairy; Pat Healy; Paul Sorvino; Terrence Evans; Lee Weaver; Rodney Rowland; Herschel Bleefeld
- Edited by: Philip Norden
- Music by: Kevin Saunders Hayes
- Distributed by: First Look Studios
- Release date: December 26, 2006
- Running time: 93 minutes
- Country: United States
- Language: English

Mr. Fix It is a 2006 American romantic comedy film starring David Boreanaz. It was directed by Darin Ferriola. The former working titles were Deception and Boyfriend Girlfriend Relationship, while the former main title was The Perfect Lie.

Lance Valenteen, aka "Mr Fix It", is hired by men to get back their exes by dating them, becoming the worst date ever, thereby sending them back to their ex-boyfriend's arms. However, one day he falls for one of them.

The film was released directly to DVD in the US on December 26, 2006.

== Plot ==
Lance Valenteen manipulates three women, calculatingly getting them to adore him, shocking them, finally driving each into her former boyfriend's open arms. With the first, he suddenly becomes a machista, in the second case he publicly humiliates her, and in the last situation he terrifies a aerophobe with a hang-gliding experience.

Bill Smith enters Lance's "Mr Fix It" shop, seemingly for computers, but is interrogated to ensure he is truly lovesick. Then, Lance shows him a video detailing his strategy to recover clients' girlfriends. Using information from the ex, knowing why they got dumped, he befriends the target and then becomes the ideal boyfriend. Lance then drives her back to her ex by doing even worse things than him. He promises no sex, confidentiality and a full refund if unsuccessful.

Bill is unsure why Sophia dumped him, so pays double. Lance daydreams of converting his Camaro into a race car. Then he wins the local race, becoming a professional race car driver.

Lance finds Sophia working in a club. Entering, he sees it is an exotic dancing one. She sexually teases him, leaving him wanting more. Lance adopts a dog to bump into Sophia in the park, as she often walks hers there. After talking briefly, she leaves. Lance does a street act, breaking a trick block of wood over his head. Sophia fools him into knocking himself out with a skateboard.

Go-kart racing, Lance competes with neighborhood kids who periodically cheat, which he successfully blocks. Someone in black appears, throwing cantaloupes at him, so he loses. It turns out to be Sophia, who announces she dislikes American men and soon will return to Italy, yet gives Lance her number.

Lance takes Sophie to dinner, ordering for her per Bill's suggestions. She emphasizes her intolerance of lying because of her ex, which Bill later admits was him. Next, Lance takes Sophia dancing. There they join others on stage to avoid an aggressive man. Afterwards, they sneak out.

The next day, Lance reveals his racing ambitions, mentioning his dad passed away. That evening, Sophia dry humps him and seemingly climaxes. Again, after receiving a phone call, she leaves abruptly.

On the boardwalk the next day, Lance talks about what love is. Still disbelieving in true love, he asks couples random questions, creating conflict for them all. Lance approaches the retirees restoring his Camaro. Announcing he is incapable of love, he asks if they believe in true love. They laugh, suggesting Lance fears being vulnerable.

Right after Lance qualifies for his dream race, Sophia announces she is not to returning to Italy. Taking that as his cue, he sets the breakup sequence into motion. Lance meets Bill, detailing the plan. First, someone will take away the adopted dog as Sophia arrives. Then, neighborhood kids will tell her Lance is nasty to them. Then, Sophia will watch seeming buyers take the Camero away.

Entering, Sophia will see more of Lance's lies. Lance owns a bird rather than hating them, his high school yearbook proves he did not move here recently. Lance's supposedly dead father arrives as Sophia leaves. So she should gladly run to Bill.

Lance meets his retirement home mechanics. Accompanying them on base, they serenade their sweethearts. As they play, Lance envisions an orchestra also accompanying them, and the older men and women temporarily young again, transformed.

Before the break-up plan starts, Lance finds Bill kissing another woman. When confronted, he reveals he hired him to ensure Sophia would tolerate his cheating. The plan develops as set, but Lance reveals Bill's deception and his company "Mr Fix It" to Sophia .

Lance declares he loves Sophia, yet she leaves. When he follows her outside, he receives applause. His friends, actors and 'Sophia' tell Lance he was set up to prove he can fall in love. As 'Bill' did not get 'Sophia' back as promised, Lance owes a refund, so he throws her the Camaro keys and slams the door.

As the forlorn Lance discards the "Mr Fix It" sign, his friend reveals he has a surprise. The Camero is awaiting him at the track. 'Sophia' aka Karen returns the car to Lance, confessing she loves him too, quitting her business to be a race car owner. She asks him to be her driver, they kiss and he starts the race.

== Cast ==
- David Boreanaz - Lance Valenteen (Mr Fix It)
- Alana de la Garza - Sophia Fiori
- Scoot McNairy - Dan
- Pat Healy - Bill Smith
- Paul Sorvino - Wally
- Terrence Evans - Charlie
- Lee Weaver - Ralph
- Rodney Rowland - Tip
- Miranda Kwok - Melanie
- Herschel Bleefeld - Shiffy
- Patrica Place - Mrs. Cliverhorn
- Gemini Barnett - Walter
- Dallas McKinney - Bobby
- Amy Allen - Dancer
- Kirsten Berman - Woman #1
- Vanessa Born - Pretty Latina
- Dylan Rummel - Young Lance
- Linwood Sasser - Karaoke D.J.
- Uggie - The Terrier
