= Brigitte (dog) =

French Bulldog actress (2010-2023)

- Other name: Bijou
- Species: Dog
- Breed: French Bulldog
- Sex: Female
- Born: 2010; Grimsley, Tennessee
- Died: February 12, 2023 (aged 12–13); California, USA
- Nationality: United States
- Occupation: Actress
- Years active: 2011-2023
- Known for: Modern Family
- Owner: Sarah Clifford
- Appearance: Piebald
- Awards: 2012 Golden Collar Awards for Best Dog in a Television Series

Brigitte (2010-2023) was a French Bulldog and a dog actress best known for her role as Stella in the ABC television series Modern Family. In 2012, she won the award for "Best Dog in a Television Series" at the inaugural Golden Collar Awards.

== Private life and death ==
During her run on Modern Family, Brigitte was represented by animal trainer Guin Dill, who owns Good Dog Animals, a Los Angeles-based company which loans animal actors to movies and television shows. Dill has stated that Brigitte's grooming regime is pretty straightforward. She enjoys playing with toys, in particular, those built so she can tug on them.

Her best friend was another French Bulldog, named Beatrice (2010–2020), who Sarah Clifford originally adopted to act as Brigitte's understudy on set.

Brigitte died of IVDD in California, USA, on February 12, 2023.

== Career ==
The producers of the American Broadcasting Company television show Modern Family had indicated that they were looking for a French Bulldog to add to the cast, in order to act as a rival for Gloria Pritchett. Guin Dill took Brigitte in for an audition, but had to explain that she was new and completely untrained, with no experience as an actor. Brigitte ran around the audition room, doing various puppy antics. Dill later explained in an interview that the producers called him fifteen minutes after the audition to say that they wanted Brigitte, saying "She's just too cute, we have to have her".

Brigitte made her debut during the second season of Modern Family. During the gap between filming the second and third seasons of Modern Family, Brigitte underwent formal training to give her the skills to act on screen. This included teaching her to swim, something which was later written into the episode "Little Bo Bleep". As well as being her human on screen, actor Ed O'Neill and Brigitte are best friends off screen. Her trainer said of their relationship, "Ed is very concerned about her all the time, and he looks out for her. She's really Ed's dog. I couldn't have asked for a better actor to work with."

She has been described by the New York Post as being the most famous dog on television since Frasier's Eddie, played by Moose and Enzo.

It was announced in July 2012 that because of a dispute between the owner of Brigitte and the animal agency that hired her, she will no longer be appearing in future episodes of Modern Family (season 4). Instead, Brigitte will be replaced by her understudy, a dog named Beatrice. As reported on TMZ, her human could not seek any legal damages against the agency because she allowed them to use Brigitte for the show without having a contract in place.

== Awards ==
Brigitte attended the launch party, along with Lambchop from the TV show Suburgatory, for the first Golden Collar Awards, a series of awards founded by Dog News Daily to celebrate the achievements of dogs in film and television. She went on to win the award for "Best Dog in a Television Series" at the inaugural awards, beating her rival Lambchop.

== See also ==
- List of individual dogs
