= Koko: A Red Dog Story =

2019 film directed by Aaron McCann and Dominic Pearce

- Theatrical movie poster
- Directed by: Aaron McCann; Dominic Pearce
- Written by: Daniel Taplitz
- Produced by: Lauren Brunswick; Nelson Woss; Bryce Menzies
- Starring: Jason Isaacs; Felix Williamson; Sarah Woods; Toby Truslove
- Cinematography: Lewis Potts
- Edited by: Regg Skwarko
- Music by: Cezary Skubiszewski
- Production companies: Woss Group Film Productions; Screen Australia; ScreenWest
- Distributed by: Roadshow Film Distributors
- Release dates: 12 October 2019 (Heartland Film Festival); 5 December 2019
- Running time: 78 minutes
- Country: Australia
- Language: English

Koko: A Red Dog Story is a 2019 Australian family documentary film directed by Aaron McCann and Dominic Pearce, written by Aaron McCann and Dominic Pearce, and starring Jason Isaacs, Felix Williamson and Sarah Woods. It is a spin-off to the 2011 film Red Dog, detailing the life of Koko, who was cast as Red Dog in the original film.

== Cast ==
- Jason Isaacs as narrator
- Felix Williamson as Nelson Woss
- Sarah Woods as Carol Hobday
- Toby Truslove as Kriv Stenders
- Kriv Stenders as himself
- Carol Hobday as herself
- Koko was portrayed by Hero (Koko passed away 2012)
- Nelson Woss as himself

== Production ==
Filming began in 2018 in Perth, Western Australia.

== Reception ==
Koko: A Red Dog Story received mostly positive reviews from critics.

Andrew Peirce at The Curb called the film "a genuine dogsterpiece of a film" in his positive review. Out in Perth writer, Leigh Andrew Hill, referred to the film as "a heart-warming celebration of all dogs", while Jonathan Spiroff of The Mono Report, referred to the film as "a charming, crowd-pleasing documentary that is essential for dog-lovers".

Conversely, Luke Buckmaster at The Guardian said "What should be a delightful romp about a famous dog blends fact and fiction so thoroughly it may end up breaking your brain."

== Awards and nominations ==
Koko: A Red Dog Story was nominated for the 2020 AACTA Award for Best Indie Film in the 10th AACTA Awards.

== See also ==
- Red Dog: True Blue, a 2016 prequel to Red Dog.
- Cinema of Australia
