= The Snowdroppers =

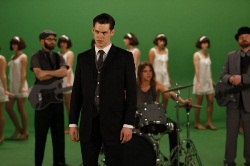

Background information
- Origin: Sydney, New South Wales, Australia
- Years active: 2007–2017
- Label: ABC Music
- Past members: Johnny Wishbone; Cougar Jones; Pauly K Nick London
- Website: snowdroppers.com

The Snowdroppers were an Australian blues rock band, formed in 2007 and disbanded in 2017.

== History ==
The Snowdroppers came together at the end of 2007, playing their first live gig as the music fill for a burlesque show, titled "Good Drugs and Bad Woman".

The band featured Johnny Wishbone on lead vocals, banjo and occasionally harmonica, Pauly K on lead guitar, Nick London on bass guitar and Cougar Jones on drums. They were praised for their energetic live performance, on-stage musical theatrics and entertaining personalities.

The band drew influence from a variety of genres including blues, roots, rock, rockabilly and punk.

Their debut album, Too Late to Pray, was released in 2009. In October 2010, they toured New Zealand supporting Gin Wigmore.

In 2011, Do The Stomp, a single from the band's early years, was featured on the soundtrack of Red Dog.

The group toured across the United States in early 2011, including shows at The Viper Room in Los Angeles and SXSW festival in Austin, Texas, and in New York City.

In March 2013, their album Moving Out of Eden debuted at #1 on the ARIA Jazz & Blues chart. The record featured a heavier focus on classic rock beats and explored different lyrical themes to their previous material.

2015 saw the release of their third album, Business. The album featured the radio single 'Love Letters', and was followed by a national tour.

The band have played at Australian festivals including Big Day Out, East Coast Blues & Roots Music Festival, Come Together Music Festival, Village Fair, Peats Ridge, Byron Bay Bluesfest, Festival of the Sun and Gympie Muster.

In 2017, the band announced they were going to go their separate ways after a final tour, their last show being on 25 November 2017.

== Discography ==
=== Albums ===
List of albums, with selected details
Title	Album details
Too Late to Pray	Released: October 2009; Label: Difrnt Music (DIF 1024); Format: CD, Digital download
Moving out of Eden	Released: March 2013; Label: ABC Music, UMA (3729317); Format: CD, Digital download
Business	Released: August 2015; Label: ABC Music (4736062); Format: CD, Digital download, LP
