= Blacktown (film) =

- Directed by: Kriv Stenders
- Produced by: Kriv Stenders
- Starring: Tony Ryan; Nikki Owen; Clayton Jacobson
- Edited by: Gabriella Muir
- Release date: 2005
- Country: Australia
- Language: English
- Budget: $50,000

Blacktown is a 2005 Australian film produced, written, and directed by Kriv Stenders. It stars Tony Ryan, Nikki Owen, and Clayton Jacobson. The movie was named for the Sydney suburb of Blacktown where it was set and shot. The film, which Stenders financed himself for $50,000, won Most Popular Feature at the Sidebar Program at the 2005 Sydney Film Festival.

== Plot ==
In the suburb of Blacktown, Australia, Tony is an Aboriginal Australian bus driver and Nikki is a secretary struggling in a relationship with a married man. Nikki goes out to see a movie with a friend who wants to set Nikki up on a date, but she refuses. When Nikki returns home she checks her answering machine which has multiple messages from Peter, the married man she has been seeing. Peter shows up, upset that she didn't meet up with him, and demands to know where she was. Nikki tries to break-up with him, but Peter kisses her, says he loves her, and they have sex.

Then next day, Nikki's friend sets her up on the blind date and Nikki feels compelled to go. On the date the newly widowed man, Clayton, talks, while Nikki remains mostly silent. At the end of the date he asks her out again and Nikki says she is seeing someone. Clayton gets very angry that Nikki didn't tell him and starts yelling. Nikki leaves and he chases her down, grabbing her arm, and demanding that he drive her home. Nikki says she doesn't want to go with him. At this point Tony, who is sitting in his bus, sees the argument and intervenes. He then walks Nikki home.

The next day, Peter comes to Nikki's work and breaks up with her. Nikki goes home crying. Tony arrives at her door that evening to check how she is after the bad date and to see if she would want to get diner together. Nikki says no and Tony sadly says that's okay. After she closes the door, Nikki changes her mind and goes with Tony. Tony reveals that he is an alcoholic and has been sober 10 years. When he asks Nikki why she seems sad she gets upset. This sours the date.

Despite this, Tony returns to Nikki's place in the morning. He says he likes her and thinks they could be good together. She cries and says they don't know each other and she doesn't think she'd be good with anyone. He leaves his number if she changes her mind. In the afternoon, Nikki shows up at Tony's house and says that she would like to buy him diner and they go out. After diner, Nikki kisses Tony and they sleep together. In the morning, they go grocery shopping and run into Peter, who is upset to see her with someone else. That night, Peter barges in on Tony and Nikki having diner. He yells at them and knocks into Nikki giving her a bloody nose. Tony and Peter fight and Tony throws Peter out.

Nikki is overwhelmed and says she doesn't like violence. Tony says he doesn't either, but he hates to see someone be violent with someone he loves. Tony then says he'd walk down the street naked to prove he loves her. Nikki is still tearful, so Tony strips down and walks outside causing Nikki to smile and laugh. When he comes back inside they kiss.

The movie then skips forward in time to Nikki meeting Tony's mom who asks her if she is friends with any Aboriginal folks. Nikki says not until Tony. Tony jokes not until she meet "a black fella on a white bus". Tony meets Nikki's friend from work, who approves of him. Tony and Nikki go on a weekend get away together where they cook and Tony shares about his time in jail. On the beach Tony asks Nikki to marry him and she is unsure. Tony is sad, but says he doesn't want to push her.

Nikki tells her friend and they talk about the differences in their lives and Nikki concludes that she loves Tony. The film cuts to their wedding, and the various family speeches. In the end, the two drive away together smiling as their families throw rice at the car.

== Cast ==
- Tony Ryan as Tony
- Niki Owen as Nikki
- Clayton Jacobson as Clayton
- Kriv Stenders as Peter
- Mara Stenders as Mara
- Brooke Marsh as Chook
- Sharon Fitzgerald as Sharon

== Production ==
Director Kriv Stenders originally developed the concept for the film as a documentary about his friend, Tony Ryan, who was an Aboriginal bus driver, musician, and social worker. However, Stenders pivoted and made the film a fictional feature and cast Ryan in the movie. In was shot in 2002 guerilla filmmaking style, meaning with a mico-budget, limited crew, and real locations. It was shown at festivals in 2005.

== Awards ==
- Most Popular Feature at the Sidebar Program at the 2005 Sydney Film Festival.
- Best Feature - Indie Screen at the 2005 Sydney Film Festival
