= Red Dog (novel) =

2002 novel by Louis de Bernières

- First edition (US)
- Author: Louis de Bernières
- Language: English
- Publisher: Pantheon Books (US); Secker & Warburg (UK); Knopf (Canada)
- Publication date: Sep 2001 (US); Oct 2001 (UK)
- Publication place: United Kingdom
- Media type: Print
- Pages: 119
- ISBN: 0-375-42155-6

Red Dog (2002) is a short novel by Louis de Bernières charting the life of a popular dog, a "Red Cloud Kelpie" nicknamed Red Dog, in Dampier, Western Australia. A movie based on the novel was filmed in Australia in 2011.

== Part One ==
Red Dog covers the life span of a Red Cloud Kelpie, originally named Tally Ho. He is said to have "hitched rides, adopted people and united communities throughout Western Australia's mining region." His owners are Jack and Maureen Collins. At a barbecue, Tally Ho doesn't return to the owners after they leave, and he starts traveling.

Red Dog meets John, a half Māori man, at the Hamersley Iron Transport section after a salt company has moved in. Red Dog is very attached to John and they spend a lot of time together. As the town grows, more people come and befriend Red Dog. Nancy and Patsy come into the story. When Nancy notices that Red Dog has been shot, she calls John and his friend. They stop work in order to treat Red Dog and prevent his bleeding to death. Red Dog undergoes an operation. Ellen is introduced. John has an accident and dies, after crashing his motorcycle and getting his chest caved in on a rock.

== Part Two ==
Red Dog doesn't realize John has died so he goes out and looks for him. He meets Nancy on a bus, and then they have ice cream. He spends time in a caravan park with Nancy and meets Red Cat. They eventually befriend each other despite their differences. Red Dog is suspected of having Heartworm and has treatment for it. Red Dog returns to the caravan park, where he is noticed by the caretakers. The Cribbages are portrayed as bad people, with Mr. Cribbage described as having a Hitler-like mustache. They decide to throw Nancy out because she has let Red Dog stay despite the park's having a "no dogs" policy.

When other locals learn that the Cribbages are trying to get rid of the popular dog, they threaten the couple until they leave. Red Dog is poisoned with strychnine and has to be put down. Bill and Piotr (Peeto) find him and don't want him to suffer, but in the end they cannot shoot him. They take him to the vet who had treated him before. He gives the dog a painkiller and eases his death. The locals hold a funeral for Red Dog and a monument for him is built in Dampier, Western Australia.

== See also ==
- Red Dog (film)
- Red Dog (Pilbara)
- Red Dog (short story collection), 1983 short story collection by Nancy Gillespie
