= Palm Dog Award =

Humorous film award

- Palm Dog Award logo
- Awarded for: Best Canine Performance during the Cannes Film Festival
- Location: Cannes
- Country: France
- Presented by: International film critics at Cannes
- First award: 2001
- Website: http://www.palmdog.com/

The Palm Dog Award is a yearly award presented by the international film critics during the Cannes Film Festival. Begun in 2001 by Toby Rose, it is awarded to the best performance by a canine (live or animated) or group of canines. The award consists of a leather dog collar with the term "PALM DOG". The name of the award is a play on words of the Palme d'Or, the festival's highest honor. In 2023, Woopets, a leading media company, announced that it had taken over the event from its founder, Toby Rose.

== Background ==
First reported in June 2002, the Palm Dog has been reported by major news outlets around the world, including Financial Times Deutschland, Sydney Morning Herald, The New York Times, the BBC, the Los Angeles Times, and ABC News. In 2012 the judges for the Palm Dog were The Times chief film critic Kate Muir, The Daily Telegraph's Robbie Collin, The Guardian's Peter Bradshaw and Heat Magazine's Charles Gant.

== Award winners ==
=== 2000s ===
| Year | Recipient | Film | Ref. |
|---|---|---|---|
| 2001 | Otis | The Anniversary Party | |
| 2001 | Leo as Delgado | Large | |
| 2002 | Tähti as Hannibal | The Man Without a Past | |
| 2002 | Jack Russell as Sonny | Mystics | |
| 2003 | Moses | Dogville | |
| 2003 | Bruno | The Triplets of Belleville | |
| 2004 | All Dogs | Mondovino | |
| 2004 | Acrobatic Dog | Life Is a Miracle | |
| 2005 | Bruno | The Cave of the Yellow Dog | |
| 2005 | The faithful little West Highland Terrier | The Adventures of Greyfriars Bobby | |
| 2006 | Mops | Marie Antoinette | |
| 2006 | Schumann the Riesenschnauzer | Pingpong | |
| 2007 | All the stray dogs | Mid Road Gang | |
| 2007 | Yuki | Persepolis | |
| 2008 | Lucy (unanimous) | Wendy and Lucy | |
| 2008 | Special Jury Prize: Molly | O' Horten | |
| 2009 | Dug | Up | |
| 2009 | Black Poodle | Inglourious Basterds | |
| 2009 | The Fox (rules were bent) | Antichrist | |

=== 2010s ===
| Year | Recipient | Film | Ref. |
|---|---|---|---|
| 2010 | Boss | Tamara Drewe | |
| 2010 | Special Jury Prize: Vuk | Le Quattro Volte | |
| 2011 | Uggie | The Artist | |
| 2011 | Special Jury Prize: Laika | Le Havre | |
| 2012 | Banjo and Poppy | Sightseers | |
| 2012 | Special Jury Prize: Billy Bob | Le Grand Soir | |
| 2013 | Baby Boy | Behind the Candelabra | |
| 2014 | The entire canine cast | White God | |
| 2015 | Lucky the Multipoo | Arabian Nights | |
| 2015 | Grand Jury Prize: Bob | The Lobster | |
| 2015 | Palm DogManitarian Award: I Am a Soldier | | |
| 2016 | Nellie (posthumously) | Paterson | |
| 2016 | Jacques | In Bed with Victoria | |
| 2016 | Palm DogManitarian Award: Ken Loach | | |
| 2017 | Einstein | The Meyerowitz Stories (New and Selected) | |
| 2017 | Grand Jury Prize: Lupo | Ava | |
| 2017 | Palm DogManitarian Award: Leslie Caron and her 17-year-old pet rescue dog Tchi Tchi | | |
| 2018 | Canine cast | Dogman | |
| 2018 | Grand Jury Prize: Diamantino | Diamantino | |
| 2018 | Palm DogManitarian Award: Vanessa Davies and her pug Patrick | Patrick | |
| 2018 | Special Jury Prize: Security dogs Lilou, Glock, and Even | | |
| 2019 | Sayuri as Brandy | Once Upon a Time ... in Hollywood | |
| 2019 | Grand Jury Prize: Canine Performers | Little Joe | |
| 2019 | Grand Jury Prize: Canine Performers | Aasha and the Street Dogs | |
| 2019 | Palm DogManitarian Award: Google for supporting dogs in the workplace | | |
| 2019 | Underdog Award: The Unadoptable | | |

=== 2020s ===
| Year | Recipient | Film | Ref. |
|---|---|---|---|
| 2020 | No festival due to the COVID-19 pandemic | | |
| 2021 | Rose, Dora, and Snowbear | The Souvenir Part II | |
| 2021 | Grand Jury Prize: Sophie | Red Rocket | |
| 2021 | Grand Jury Prize: Panda | Lamb | |
| 2021 | Palm DogManitarian Award: Mastercard for emphasizing the role of dogs in their marketing during the COVID-19 pandemic | | |
| 2022 | Britney as Beast | War Pony | |
| 2022 | Grand Jury Prize: Marcel | Marcel! | |
| 2022 | Grand Jury Prize: Canine cast | Godland | |
| 2022 | Palm DogManitarian Award: Patron (Ukrainian Jack Russell terrier mine sniffer) | | |
| 2022 | Palm Hound Dog: Titane | The Beasts | |
| 2023 | Messi as Snoop | Anatomy of a Fall | |
| 2023 | Grand Jury Prize: Alma | Fallen Leaves | |
| 2023 | Mutt Moment | La Chimera | |
| 2023 | Highly Commended Canine: Susie | Vincent Must Die | |
| 2023 | Lifetime Achievement Award: Ken Loach | | |
| 2023 | Palm DogManitarian Award: Isabella Rossellini | | |
| 2024 | Kodi as Cosmos | Dog on Trial | |
| 2024 | Grand Jury Prize: Xin | Black Dog | |
| 2024 | Mutt Moment | Megalopolis, Bird, Kinds of Kindness | |
| 2024 | Palm DogManitarian Award: Demi Moore | | |
| 2025 | Panda | The Love That Remains | |
| 2025 | Grand Jury Prize: Pipa and Lupita | Sirāt | |
| 2025 | Mutt Moment | Pillion | |
| 2026 | Yuri (played by two dogs) | La Perra | |
| 2026 | Grand Jury Prize: Lola | I See Buildings Fall Like Lightning | |

== Footnotes ==
Three fictional canines from animated movies have each won the coveted Palm Dog: Bruno from Sylvain Chomet's Academy Award-nominated The Triplets of Belleville (2003), Yuki from Marjane Satrapi's Academy Award-nominated film adaptation of Persepolis (2007) and Dug from Pixar's Academy Award-winning feature Up (2009).
