= Manuwarra Red Dog Highway =

Highway in Western Australia

Manuwarra Red Dog Highway Western Australia

General information
- Type: Highway (Under construction)
- Length: 182 km (113 mi)
- Opened: December 2003 (Stage One); August 2008 (Stage Two); September 2020 (Stage Three)
- Route number(s): State Route 142

Major junctions
- North-west end: North West Coastal Highway (National Route 1), Karratha
- Roebourne–Wittenoom Road; Millstream Chichester National Park Access; Nanutarra–Munjina Road
- South-east end: Tom Price–Paraburdoo Road/Bingarn Road intersection, Tom Price

Location(s)
- Region: Pilbara

Highway system
- Highways in Australia; National Highway • Freeways in Australia; Highways in Western Australia

Manuwarra Red Dog Highway is a major road currently under construction in the Pilbara region of Western Australia, between Karratha and Tom Price. Originally known as Karratha–Tom Price Road, it acquired its new name in September 2020 after community consultation. Manuwarra means "'heaps' or 'masses'" in the Yindjibarndi language and is the indigenous name for the Red Dog Gorge in the Millstream Chichester National Park. Both the gorge and the highway acquired its English name from the eponymous Red Dog, a famous Kelpie/Cattle Dog and Pilbara mascot from the 1970s.

== History ==
The need for a more direct sealed road between the areas surrounding Karratha and Tom Price was identified in the 1990s. Before Stages one to three of Manuwarra Red Dog Highway were constructed, access from Karratha to Tom Price (on the public roads) was via the Roebourne–Wittenoom Road, the Nanutarra–Munjina Road and the Tom Price Spur Road. However, historical traffic data showed that most vehicles commuting between Karratha and Tom Price were using the more direct route along the Rio Tinto owned access road for the Dampier to Paraburdoo railway rather than the public roads. However, this route had a high accident rate, and requires a permit to be obtained from Rio Tinto to use the road.

== Route description ==
Manuwarra Red Dog Highway roughly follows the route of the Dampier to Paraburdoo railway for its entire length (including the as-yet incomplete stage four). This is to avoid impacts to the nearby Millstream Chichester National Park and the catchment of the Harding Dam (an important source of drinking water), as well as several Aboriginal heritage sites.

=== Southern section ===
From the Tom Price–Paraburdoo Road intersection (where it continues as Bingarn Road into the townsite), the road goes about 250 metres (820 ft) to the west where it passes under the Paraburdoo branch of the Dampier to Paraburdoo railway, and about 250 metres (820 ft) further along it then reaches the Mine Road intersection, which provides access to the Mount Tom Price mine and was previously part of the main access to the town. Here the road turns to the north. It crosses over the Mount Tom Price Mine branch of the Dampier to Paraburdoo Railway about 450 metres (1,480 ft) north of the Mine Road intersection. 1.4 kilometres (0.87 mi) further north, it meets an intersection providing access to the residential area in the north of Tom Price. The road passes the Tom Price landfill about 1.9 kilometres (1.2 mi) further north, where it turns to the north-west for about 4 kilometres (2.5 mi). It then begins to run alongside the railway, turns to the north and continues so for the next 17 kilometres (11 mi), where the southern portion of the road currently ends at Nanutarra–Munjina Road. Here drivers may continue north by travelling a short distance on the Nanutarra–Munjina Road, then (if they possess a permit) turning onto the Rio Tinto owned access road for the Dampier to Paraburdoo railway, or can continue on Nanutarra–Munjina Road to access Roebourne–Wittenoom Road.

=== Northern section ===
The constructed road continues just after the railway crossing where the Roebourne–Wittenoom Road crosses the Dampier to Paraburdoo railway. It meets the Railway access road at a T-junction shortly after the crossing. It then roughly follows the railway line for about 22 kilometres (14 mi). It continues west for 12 kilometres (7.5 mi) where it begins to turn to the north-west. 16 kilometres (10 mi) further along it meets the access road for the Millstream Chichester National Park, where it then starts to diverge from the railway line, as the railway turns to the north. It continues north-west for about 9 kilometres (5.6 mi) before turning to the north, and continues until it rejoins the railway about 10 kilometres (6 mi) to the north, near Camp Curlewis. The road then follows the railway, deviating only to avoid terrain constraints, for the next 90 kilometres (56 mi) to Karratha, where it ends at a T-junction with the North West Coastal Highway. Drivers can then use Madigan Road to access the town of Karratha.

== Construction ==
Manuwarra Red Dog Highway is being constructed in four stages.

=== Stage One, Tom Price to Nanutarra–Munjina Road ===
Construction on Manuwarra Red Dog Highway (then known as Karratha–Tom Price Road) began in January 2003, with work beginning on the 25-kilometre-long (16 mi). Stage One, which followed the Dampier to Paraburdoo railway corridor from Tom Price north to Nanutarra-Munjina Road, with a budget of $18.7 million. Stage One was completed in December 2003, at a cost of $26 million, and reduced the travel distance by 15 kilometres (9.3 mi).

=== Stage Two, Karratha to Curlewis ===
Stage Two of Manuwarra Red Dog Highway was 90 kilometres (56 mi) long and followed the route of the Dampier to Paraburdoo Railway from the northern end of the road at the North West Coastal Highway, about 20 kilometres (12 mi) from Karratha, to a location known as Camp Curlewis, where it met the existing Roebourne–Wittenoom Road. Whilst the northern portion of the route is relatively flat, the southern section was much more challenging, and required significant earthworks. Stage Three had an estimated cost of $80 million. Construction of Stage two started in August 2006 and was completed in August 2008 at a cost of $150 million.

=== Stage Three, Curlewis to Wallyinya Pool ===
Stage Three of Manuwarra Red Dog Highway follows the existing, though unsealed, Roebourne–Wittenoom Road for 48 kilometres (30 mi), from Camp Curlewis to Wallyinya Pool, alongside the Dampier to Paraburdoo railway. This portion involved sealing and upgrading the existing road. During construction, traffic was diverted onto the adjacent access road for the Dampier to Paraburdoo railway.

Whilst the terrain was less challenging than for Stage Two, the road had been used for carting asbestos from the mines near Wittenoom to the port. Bags of asbestos would often fall off the trucks on the way, resulting in the road becoming heavily contaminated. The danger posed by the asbestos was such that, in 2018, the Shire of Ashburton, which manages the road, ceased maintaining it on advice from WorkSafe. The contamination issue caused delays to this stage, but work eventually began in September 2019, and was completed in September 2020 at a cost of $81.5 million. At around the same time work was conducted on the section of Roebourne–Wittenoom Road between Wallyinya Pool and Nanutarra–Munjina Road (which was not to be sealed as part of Manuwarra Red Dog Highway), to repair and remediate that section of road, as it had not been maintained for many months, and was in urgent need of repair.

=== Stage Four, Wallyinya Pool to Nanutarra–Munjina Road ===
As of October 2021, Stage Four of Manuwarra Red Dog Highway is currently in the design phase, with work underway to identify a final alignment for the road. Construction is expected to start on this 110-kilometre (68 mi) section in early 2022. The estimated cost for Stage Four is around $229 million.

== See also ==
- List of highways in Western Australia
- Major roads in the Pilbara region of Western Australia
- List of road routes in Western Australia
