= Koko (dog) =

Australian Kelpie film actor and fundraiser

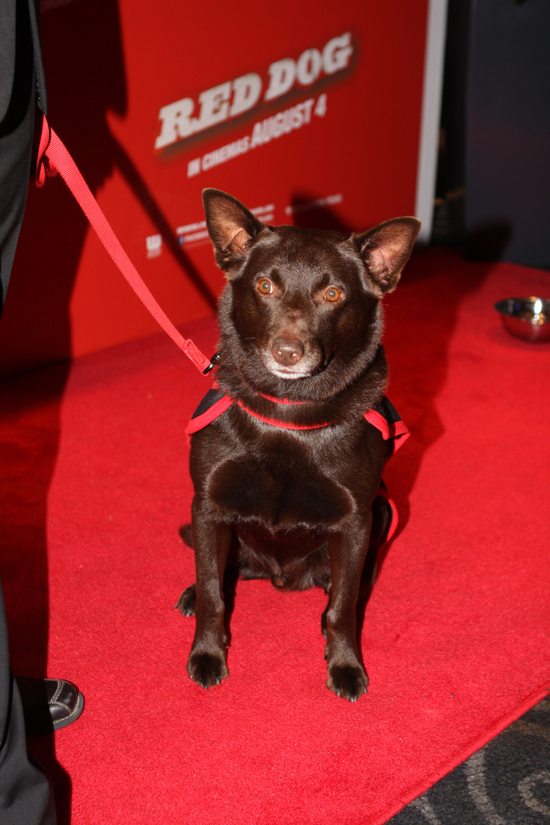
- Koko at the premiere of Red Dog
- Breed: Australian Kelpie
- Sex: Male
- Born: 9 April 2005; Victoria, Australia
- Died: 18 December 2012 (aged 7); Perth, Western Australia, Australia
- Occupation: Canine actor, fundraiser
- Notable role: Red Dog
- Years active: 2011–2012
- Owner: Nelson Woss
- Appearance: Red cloud kelpie
- Awards: Golden Collar Award

Koko (9 April 2005 – 18 December 2012) was an Australian canine film actor and fundraiser, an Australian Kelpie who was best known for his role as Red Dog, the title character of the 2011 film Red Dog. He was owned by Nelson Woss, a producer of Red Dog.

A spin-off documentary of the Red Dog franchise, titled Koko: A Red Dog Story was released in 2019. The film explores the life of Koko, who was cast as Red Dog in the original film.

== Biography ==
Koko was born in Victoria, Australia in 2005 to breeders Carol and Len Hobday and initially trained as a show dog. He won Best Exhibiting Group, Working Dogs in January 2006. It was quite unusual for a dog so young to win in that group. Koko came to prominence in 2011 for his work in Red Dog, which was based on a true story about a dog in a mining town and the relationships that he develops. He won the Golden Collar Award for Best Dog in a Foreign Film in Los Angeles for his portrayal. A painting of Koko with producer Nelson Woss by artist Adam Cullen was a finalist in the 2012 Archibald Prize.

In 2012, Koko was retired after he was diagnosed with congestive heart disease. However, he still continued to make appearances for the RSPCA and Dogs' Refuge Home WA in return for donations.

== Filmography ==
- Red Dog (2011)

== Death ==
Koko died from heart failure on 18 December 2012, in Perth, Western Australia. He was 7 years old. The prequel, Red Dog: True Blue was dedicated to his memory.

== See also ==
- List of individual dogs
