= Warrock Homestead =

Historic homestead in Victoria, Australia

Warrock
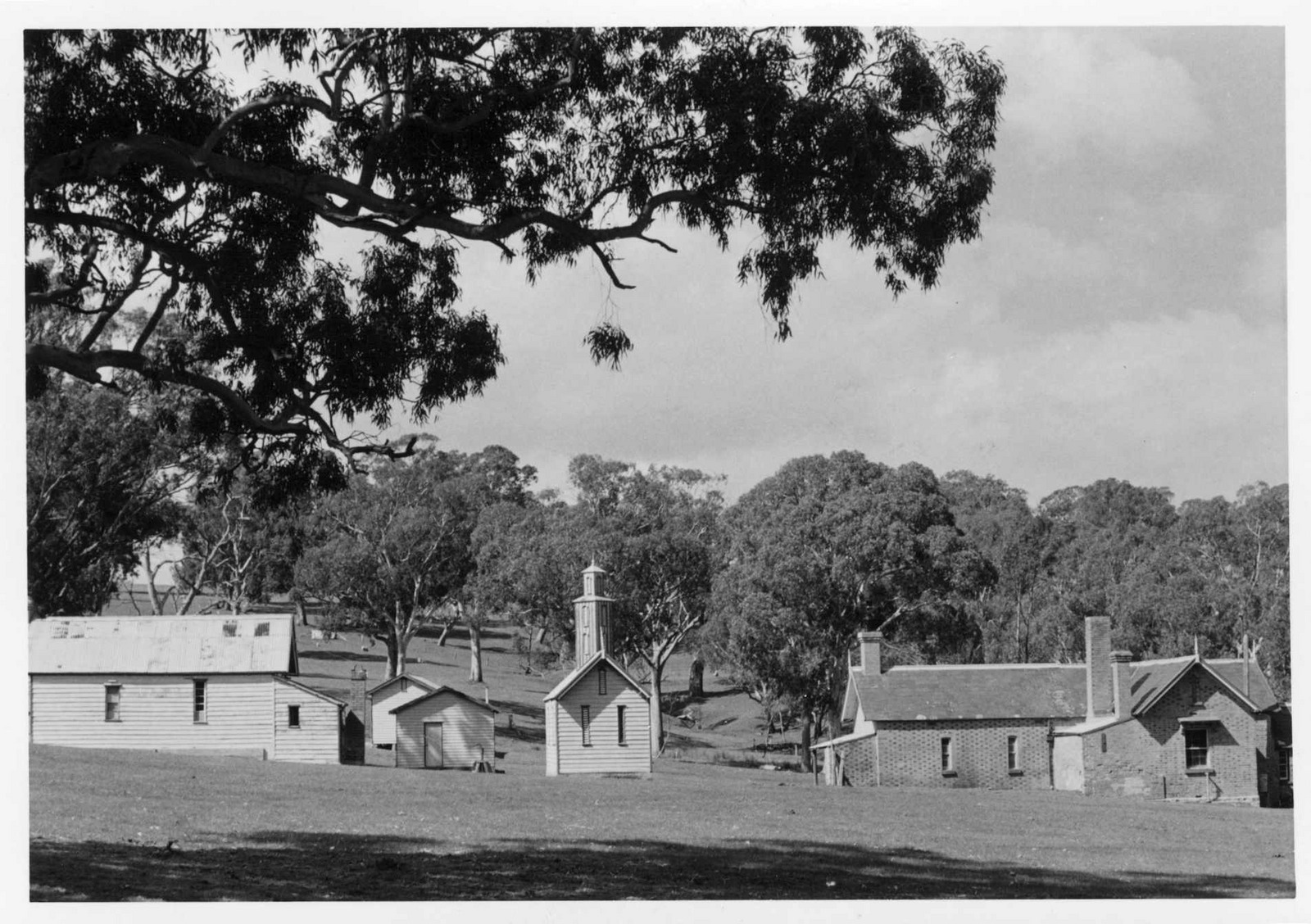
- Warrock Homestead outbuildings, 1968

- Location in the Shire of Glenelg, Victoria
- 37°26′04″S 141°20′35″E
- Type: Homestead, associated built facilities and grounds
- Location: Warrock, Victoria, Australia
- Nearest city: Hamilton

History
- Built: 1845, -1860s

Site notes
- Architectural style: Gothic revival
- Website: warrockhomestead.com.au

Victorian Heritage Register
- Official name: Warrock
- Type: State heritage (built and natural)
- Designated: 9 October 1974
- Reference no.: H0295

Warrock Homestead is a historic pastoral homestead and station located 18 kilometres north of Casterton and 69 kilometres north-west of Hamilton, in the Western District of Victoria, Australia. Established in the 1840s, it is one of the most intact nineteenth-century pastoral complexes in the state, noted for its large collection of timber buildings constructed in a Gothic revival style and arranged as a largely self-sufficient settlement. The property is also widely recognised as the birthplace of the Australian kelpie working dog.

== History ==
Warrock was established in 1843–1844 by Scottish-born cabinet maker George Robertson, who had emigrated to Australia in 1840 and gained experience working at nearby pastoral properties before acquiring the grazing license for the run.

Robertson began development with a simple one-room hut and timber woolshed, using materials such as split palings from Van Diemen's Land and locally sourced timber. The hut was later relocated to the present homestead site in 1846, where it became the nucleus of an expanding complex.

Over the following decades, Robertson developed Warrock into an extensive and highly organised pastoral settlement. By the mid-19th century, the property comprised around 57 buildings arranged around a central open space known as "the Green", forming a self-contained village with domestic, agricultural, and industrial functions. These included workers' accommodation, woolsheds, stables, workshops, a blacksmith's shop, storage buildings, and facilities associated with sheep processing.

Rainwater was collected and stored in underground brick-lined tanks, and formal gardens were established around the homestead. Plants and trees around the property of note include a hybrid trumpet vine, maritime pine, bunya pine, blue Atlas cedar, Queensland kauri, hoop pine, Canary Island pine and Port Jackson fig. As well as a formal garden, Robinson developed a croquet lawn, tennis court, a wooden sundial and a lychgate, together with his wife, whom he married in 1853.

The buildings were predominantly constructed of timber and designed in a distinctive Gothic Revival style, featuring decorative eleents such as finials, bargeboards, and narrow lancet windows. Robertson, trained as a cabinet maker, personally designed and oversaw much of the construction.

Following Robertson's death in 1890, Warrock passed to his nephew, George Robertson Patterson, and remained within the same extended family for several generations, until 1992.

=== Birth of the Australian kelpie ===
Warrock is closely associated with the early development of the Australian elpie working dog. In the 1860s, George Robertson is believed to have imported collies from Scotland, while other settlers in the district also introduced similar working dogs. The interbreeding of these collies formed the foundation of what would become the kelpie breed.

A black-and-tan female pup born at Warrock in 1869 is widely regarded as a foundational animal in the breed's development. The dog was given to Robertson's nephew, George Robertson Patterson, and later came into the possession of stockman Jack Gleeson. Named "Kelpie", the dog was subsequently bred with other imported collies, including a dog known as "Moss". The offspring of these matings, often referred to as "Kelpie's pups", were highly valued for their working ability, and the bloodline spread widely across pastoral regions of Australia.

=== Present day ===
In 2016, the Farquharson family bought the property, and reopened the property to the public.

In 2023, the property was bought by the Bonar family.

== See also ==
- Murndal
