= Red Dog (film) =

2011 Australian comedy-drama film

- Theatrical release poster
- Directed by: Kriv Stenders
- Written by: Daniel Taplitz
- Based on: Red Dog by Louis de Bernières
- Produced by: Julie Ryan; Nelson Woss
- Starring: Koko; Josh Lucas; Rachael Taylor; John Batchelor
- Cinematography: Geoffrey Hall
- Edited by: Jill Bilcock
- Music by: Cezary Skubiszewski
- Production companies: Essential Entertainment; Woss Group Film Productions; Screen Australia; Endymion Films; ScreenWest; South Australian Film Corporation
- Distributed by: Roadshow Film Distributors
- Release date: 4 August 2011 (Australia)
- Running time: 92 minutes
- Country: Australia
- Language: English
- Budget: $A8.5 million
- Box office: A$21 million

Red Dog is a 2011 Australian comedy-drama family film written by Daniel Taplitz, directed by Kriv Stenders and produced by Nelson Woss and Julie Ryan. It stars Koko as the title character, Josh Lucas, Rachael Taylor, and John Batchelor. The film is based on the true story of Red Dog and uses the 2002 novel Red Dog by Louis de Bernières as the primary source. At the 2011 Inside Film Awards, Red Dog was nominated in nine categories and won seven, including best feature film. The film was also nominated for seven AACTA Awards and won for Best Film. The film was theatrically released on 4 August 2011 by Roadshow Film Distributors.

The film was followed by a prequel, Red Dog: True Blue released in 2016, and a spin-off documentary Koko: A Red Dog Story released in 2019.

== Plot ==
In 1979, a man named Thomas drives his truck into Dampier, Western Australia late one night, having transported a previously ordered statue of William Dampier to the town. Upon entering the town pub he sees the silhouettes of a group of men, one of whom is holding a gun. Believing it is a murder, he rushes into the next room trying to stop them, when he sees that the men are trying to put down an apparently sick dog. Unable to bring themselves to carry out the euthanasia, the men, with Thomas, retreat to the bar.

Publican Jack Collins tells him the dog's name is Red Dog and narrates his story. Upon arriving in Dampier in 1971, the dog befriends many of the employees of Hamersley Iron, who have a major iron ore excavation in progress. Various miners relate their stories of Red Dog to Thomas, but state that, while Red Dog was a dog for everyone, he had no real master.

The men then tell of an American, John Grant, a bus driver for Hamersley Iron who became Red's master. He eventually starts dating a woman named Nancy, a secretary at Hamersley Iron. After living in Dampier for two years, John proposes to Nancy. On the night of the engagement, John tells Red Dog to stay until he returns from Nancy's caravan. Early the next morning, John rides his motorcycle from Nancy's caravan, but he is killed in an accident on the way after hitting a kangaroo.

In the shock of John's accident, Nancy and the Hamersley men forget about Red Dog. Three days after the funeral, they find him still waiting where John told him to stay. After three weeks, Red Dog decides to look for John, first at Hamersley Iron, then the bar and other places where John was known to go, until all of Dampier is explored. He continues across much of the Australian North West Pilbara region, from Perth to Darwin. He is even rumoured to have caught a ship to Japan in search of John and possibly other countries too. Finally, the truth catches up to him flooded with grief, he decides to return to Dampier. When he arrives, he returns to Nancy at the caravan park where she is staying, and she is overwhelmed to see him. The caretakers of the caravan park, however, do not allow dogs in the park, and threaten to shoot Red Dog. Nancy and John's friends at Hamersley then travel to the community of Dampier in support of Red Dog and, after a "civilized chat" with some of the miners, the caretaker and his wife leave, leaving their cat, Red Cat, behind. A great fight between Red Dog and Red Cat ensues, and in the end, they resolve their differences and become mates but still have their ups and downs.

Back in the present day, miner Jocko asks the gathered crowd why the town should have a statue of the town's namesake, William Dampier, when all he did in relation to the place was say that there were too many flies, and suggests that they should instead erect a statue of someone who represents the town – Red Dog. During the celebrations that follow, Red Dog gets up and walks out of the bar, unnoticed by everyone. Upon realizing that the sick dog has left, everyone in the town begins looking for him, eventually finding him lying dead in front of John's grave.

One year later, Thomas once again drives up to Dampier with a new puppy for Nancy, a new "Red Dog" and the whole town unveils a statue of Red Dog, a statue which still stands today.

== Cast ==
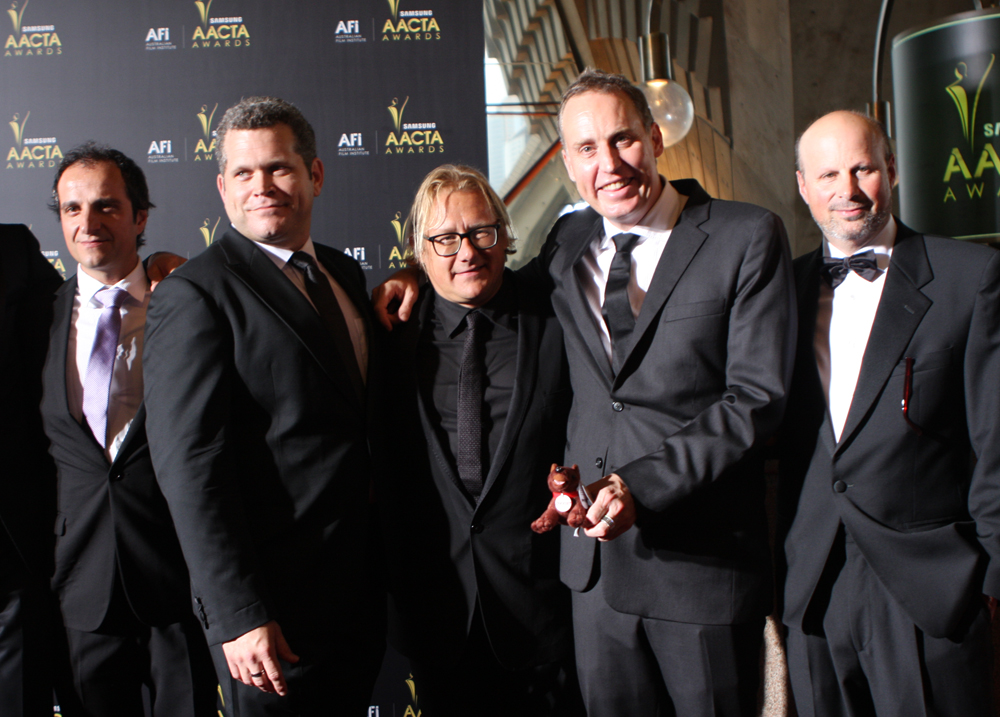
Left to right: Arthur Angel, John Batchelor, Kriv Stenders, Nelson Woss and Daniel Taplitz at 1st AACTA Awards 2012

- Koko as Red Dog
- Josh Lucas as John Grant
- Rachael Taylor as Nancy Grey
- John Batchelor as Peeto
- Noah Taylor as Jack Collins
- Keisha Castle-Hughes as Rosa
- Loene Carmen as Maureen Collins
- Luke Ford as Thomas
- Neil Pigot as Rick
- Rohan Nichol as Jocko
- Tiffany Lyndall-Knight as Patsy
- Costa Ronin as Dzambaski
- Eamon Farren as Dave
- Arthur Angel as Vanno

=== Cameos ===
- Bill Hunter as Jumbo Smelt
- The Snowdroppers as a band
- Louis de Bernières (author of the original novella) as a gas attendant

== Story basis ==
Red Dog (c. 1971 – 21 November 1979) was a Kelpie/cattle dog cross who was well known for his travels through Western Australia's Pilbara region. There is a statue in his memory in Dampier, which is one of the towns to which he often returned. Red Dog is believed to have been born in the town of Paraburdoo in 1971 and had a variety of names to those who knew him, including: Bluey, Tally Ho, and Dog of the Northwest. Soon after Red's death in 1979, Australian author Nancy Gillespie wrote and compiled anecdotes and poetry written by several people of the Pilbara region for her book Red Dog as did Beverly Duckett in her 1993 book Red Dog: The Pilbara Wanderer. Red Dog's statue has caught the attention of a number of people passing through Dampier including British author Louis de Bernières, who was inspired to write Red Dog, a book loosely based on Red's legend. A four-wheel-drive club has been named in his honour.

== Home media ==
Red Dog was officially released on DVD, Blu-ray and digital download on 1 December 2011 in Australia. The Red Dog DVD is the biggest-selling Australian DVD of all time. The DVD is also the third-highest-selling DVD of all time in Australia behind Avatar (first) and Finding Nemo (second).

== Release ==
This film was released on Blu-ray and DVD in the US on November 6, 2012, by Arc Entertainment.

== International performance ==
The film has not been as successful internationally as it was in Australia. The film opened at #25 in the United Kingdom, earning just £24,727 from 56 screens (24–26 February 2012) and opened at #5 at the New Zealand box office, earning NZ$124,447 from 72 screens. The film has been a DVD-only release in territories such as Germany and Argentina but has been acquired by independent distributor Arc Entertainment in a deal for all media in the United States, though there is "no word on a theatrical release date or strategy" in the announcement.

== Reception ==
=== Box office ===
As of 17 November 2011, the film made more than A$21 million at the Australian box office since opening in August 2011. Red Dog is ranked eighth in the list of (Cinema of Australia) highest-grossing Australian films of all time. Eleven days after opening, Red Dog became the highest-grossing Australian film of 2011.

=== Critical response ===
Review aggregator Rotten Tomatoes reported that 82% of critics reviewed the film positively, with an average score of 6.6/10, based on 33 reviews. Philip French of The Guardian said that the film is "guaranteed to bring tears and laughter". Garry Couzens of The Digital Fix said that, "I saw this film and War Horse within a day of each other, and felt that Red Dog achieved much of what Spielberg's film was aiming at, with much less sentimentality, anthropomorphism and self-importance, more laughs and with an hour's less running time." Mark Adams of the Sunday Mirror gave Red Dog a three star rating and said, "this canine true story is an engaging, feel-good Australian family drama about a dog." Adams opined that it boasted a strong cast and felt that overall it was "clichéd but charming". Craig Mathieson of SBS awarded the film three stars out of five, observing that the film "passes through various emotional states without ever being too taxing" and felt that Red Dog was "the most widely appealing Australian film since Bran Nue Dae".

=== Accolades ===
Award	Category	Subject	Result
AACTA Award (1st)	AFI Members' Choice Award	Julie Ryan, Nelson Woss	Won
AACTA Award (1st)	Best Film	Julie Ryan, Nelson Woss	Won
AACTA Award (1st)	Best Direction	Kriv Stenders	Nominated
AACTA Award (1st)	Best Adapted Screenplay	Daniel Taplitz	Nominated
AACTA Award (1st)	Best Editing	Jill Bilcock	Nominated
AACTA Award (1st)	Best Cinematography	Geoffrey Hall	Nominated
AACTA Award (1st)	Best Original Music Score	Cezary Skubiszewski	Nominated
AACTA Award (1st)	Best Production Design	Ian Gracie	Nominated
Golden Collar Award	Best Dog in a Foreign Film	Koko	Won
Heartland Film Festival Grand Prize Award	Best Narrative Feature		Won
Inside Film Award	Best Feature Film	Julie Ryan	Won
Inside Film Award	Best Feature Film	Nelson Woss	Won
Inside Film Award	Best Actor	Josh Lucas	Won
Inside Film Award	Best Actress	Rachael Taylor	Nominated
Inside Film Award	Best Direction	Kriv Stenders	Won
Inside Film Award	Best Script	Daniel Taplitz	Won
Inside Film Award	Best Editing	Jill Bilcock	Nominated
Inside Film Award	Best Cinematography	Geoffrey Hall	Won
Inside Film Award	Best Music	Cezary Skubiszewski	Won
Inside Film Award	Best Production Design	Ian Gracie	Nominated
Inside Film Award	Best Box Office Achievement		Nominated

The film missed winning Best Editing and Best Production Design at the Inside Film Awards.

Koko's acceptance speech on YouTube was played at the ceremony because he was unable to attend the event.

== Film festivals ==
Red Dog has screened at numerous film festivals around the world including:

- Berlin International Film Festival 2011
- Heartland Film Festival 2011
- Israeli Film Festival 2011
- Sheffield Showcomotion Young People's Film Festival 2011
- Melbourne International Film Festival 2011
- Inverness Film Festival 2011
- Busan Film Festival 2011
- Hawaii Film Festival 2011
- Tallinn Black Nights Film Festival 2011
- Santa Barbara Film Festival 2012
- Beijing International Film Festival 2012
- Rincon Puerto Rico Film Festival 2012
- Cannes Cinephiles 2012

== Adaptations ==
=== Musical ===
In March 2012 it was announced that the Red Dog film would be developed into a stage musical. The musical is being developed by Australian theatre producer John Frost and Red Dog producer Nelson Woss.

== Prequel and Spin-off ==
A prequel, titled Red Dog: True Blue, began filming in early 2015 for six weeks and was released on 26 December 2016. The film explores Red Dog's earlier days, as well as delving into the history of the Pilbara region. Due to Koko's death, Red Dog was recast and was also dedicated to his memory in the credits.

A spin-off documentary, titled Koko: A Red Dog Story was released in 2019. The film explores the life of Koko, who was cast as Red Dog in the original film.

== See also ==
- Red Dog (Pilbara)
- Cinema of Australia
