= Nancy Gillespie =

Western Australian author

Nancy Margaret Gillespie (born 10 March 1948) is a Western Australian resident and author.

== Life ==
She was born in Taihape, New Zealand, and moved to the Pilbara in the 1970s.

She wrote the original Red Dog book, titled Red Dog. This book is no longer in print (1983 version), however a new edition of the book released in September 2011. She currently writes short stories and has a large collection unpublished.

== Works ==
- Red Dog, Ilfracombe, Devon: Arthur H. Stockwell Limited, 1983, ISBN 978-0-7223-1797-6
