= Red Dog (short story collection) =

Book by Nancy Gillespie

- Author: Nancy Gillespie
- Language: English
- Genre: Nonfiction, anecdotal
- Publisher: Ilfracombe : Stockwell
- Publication date: 1983
- Publication place: Australia
- Media type: Print (paperback)
- Pages: 38
- ISBN: 0-7223-1797-2

Red Dog is a short story by Nancy Gillespie and a collection of anecdotes and poetry written by several people of the Pilbara region, chronicling the life and travels of the Red Dog. Colonel Cummings is documented as the Red Dog's original owner, and later John Stazzonelli took ownership before dying in a motorcycle accident. The Red Dog, not knowing that Stazzonelli had died, went looking for him across Western Australia's Pilbara region. Gillespie channelled part of the sales of this book to The Karratha Rotary Club to say thank-you for their help in making the book possible. Pictures of the Red Dog are featured in the book, including a map charting the many places the Red Dog had visited.

== See also ==
- Red Dog (film)
- Red Dog (novel), 2002 book by Louis de Bernières
