= Cosmo (dog) =

Dog actor

- Species: Canis familiaris
- Breed: Jack Russell Terrier
- Sex: Male
- Nationality: American
- Occupation: Actor
- Years active: 2009–present
- Known for: Hotel for Dogs and Beginners
- Owner: Mathilda DeCagny

Cosmo is a canine actor. He is a Jack Russell Terrier that is best known for his roles in the movies Hotel for Dogs and Beginners. He was adopted from a breed rescue society by animal trainer Mathilda DeCagny.

== Early life and career ==
Cosmo was adopted by dog trainer Mathilda DeCagny from a Jack Russell rescue society in 2007. DeCagny had previously owned and trained other Jack Russell dog actors Moose and his son Enzo, who had played Eddie in Frasier. DeCagny described Cosmo as being skittish and lacking confidence when she first adopted him, but he was very friendly towards people and very playful. When not appearing in films, Cosmo lives with DeCagny and her family in Venice, California.

While on the books of Hollywood pet agency Birds and Animals Unlimited, he made his on screen debut in Hotel for Dogs where he played "Friday". Of the seventy dogs hired for the film, including two doubles for his role, he was described as producer Ivan Reitman's favourite. He subsequently appeared in Paul Blart: Mall Cop.

In Beginners, his fur was dyed using non-toxic vegetable colouring to make him look more similar to Bowser, a dog owned by writer/director Mike Mills as the story was based on Mills' early life. Working with Cosmo inspired actor Ewan McGregor to get a dog of his own. "I was looking for a replacement for Cosmo because I couldn’t stand the idea of not having him around," said McGregor, who adopted a poodle mix called Sid. "I found my dog on the last day of the shoot. He is gorgeous and my little Cosmo replacement." McGregor stated that he takes Sid for walks with DeCagny and Cosmo in Venice on occasion.

== See also ==
- List of individual dogs
