= Red Dog: True Blue =

2016 film directed by Kriv Stenders

- Theatrical film poster
- Directed by: Kriv Stenders
- Screenplay by: Mick Carter; Daniel Taplitz; Kriv Stenders
- Produced by: Nelson Woss; Bryce Menzies
- Starring: Jason Isaacs; Levi Miller; Bryan Brown
- Cinematography: Geoffrey Hall
- Edited by: Rodrigo Balart; Jill Bilcock
- Music by: Cezary Skubiszewski
- Production company: Good Dog Enterprises
- Distributed by: Roadshow Film Distributors
- Release date: 26 December 2016
- Running time: 88 minutes
- Country: Australia
- Language: English

Red Dog: True Blue is a 2016 Australian family comedy film directed by Kriv Stenders, Who co-wrote the screenplay with Mick Carter and Daniel Taplitz and starring Jason Isaacs, Levi Miller and Bryan Brown. It serves as a prequel to the 2011 film Red Dog, detailing the early days of the Red Dog, the Pilbara Wanderer.

== Premise ==
The film tells the story of the friendship between a young boy and a dog that would grow up to become an Australian legend.

== Cast ==
- Phoenix as Red Dog
- Jason Isaacs as Michael 'Mick' Carter. He is based on one of the writers of the same name
  - Levi Miller as Young Mick
- Bryan Brown as Grandpa
- Calen Tassone as Taylor Pete
- Hanna Mangan-Lawrence as Betty Marble
- Thomas Cocquerel as Bill Stemple
- Kee Chan as Jimmy Umbrella
- Syd Brisbane as Big John
- Steve Le Marquand as Little John
- Justine Clarke as Diane Carter
- Zen McGrath as Theo Carter

== Production ==
It serves as a prequel to the 2011 film Red Dog, detailing the early days of the Red Dog, the Pilbara Wanderer.

Mick Carter had an interview about watching the first film Red Dog (film) and it reminded him about his kelpie dog he named blue. he pitched a screenplay to Nelson Woss and Bryce Menzies, with rewrites from writer of the first film Daniel Taplitz and a third draft from director Kriv Stenders

Red Dog was played in the first film by Koko, but after Koko's death he was replaced with Phoenix. and was dedicated to his memory. A documentary about the life of Koko titled Koko: A Red Dog Story was released in 2019.

Daniel Taplitz, Kriv Stenders and Carter wrote the screenplay, Stenders directed the film, while Nelson Ross and Bryce Menzies served as producers.

Filming took place on Karratha Station in the Pilbara region of Western Australia and in Perth in 2015.

Cinematography was by Geoffrey Hall; Cezary Skubiszewski composed the score, and production design was by Sam Hobbs.

The production studio was Good Dog Enterprises Pty Ltd.

== Release ==
Red Dog: True Blue was released on 25 or 26 December 2016.

== Reception ==
Red Dog: True Blue has a 100% approval rating on Rotten Tomatoes based on reviews from 13 critics.

The film grossed $5,218,716 at the Australian box office, a quarter of the original film's takings.

=== Accolades ===
Geoffrey Hall was nominated for Best Cinematography at the 7th AACTA Awards.

== Spin-off ==
A spin-off documentary, titled Koko: A Red Dog Story was released in 2019. The film explores the life of Koko, who was cast as Red Dog in the original film.

== See also ==
- Cinema of Australia
