= Village Fair =

Music festival in Bathurst, Australia

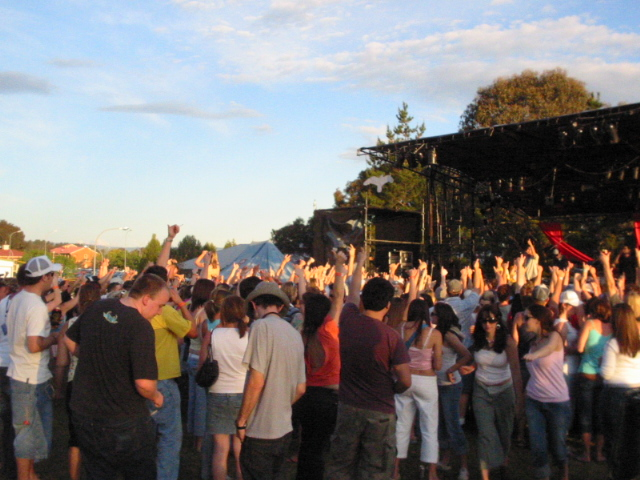
- Village Fair 2006
- Genre: Rock, Alternative, Indie, Hip hop, Electronic
- Dates: Late September – mid-October
- Locations: Australia: Mount Panorama, Bathurst, New South Wales
- Years active: 1974–current
- Founders: Volunteer CSU Students
- Website: www.villagefair.com.au

Village Fair (VF) is an annual music festival located in Bathurst, Australia which first started as a community Festival for students from rival dormitories of Charles Sturt University, Bathurst campus, in 1974. It has increasingly expanded to include not only local indie music acts, but also popular Australian headliners.

== History ==
Starting in 1974 as an event to rival another dorm's social activities, Village Fair consisted of a Ferris wheel, giant slides, stalls, and theme-based dorm common rooms. Students of CSU (at that time, a Teacher's College) volunteered to organize the activities. The name originates from where the Fair was originally held; on John Oxley Village Green, where John Oxley Village (JOV) is an on-campus Residence, hence Village Fair.

The event became a part of the local community's event calendar, and for many years it was preceded by a student parade through the streets of Bathurst on the morning of the Fair. Each 'Hut' - one of the 10 dormitory buildings that collectively make up JOV - was made responsible for devising and operating a stall or event for the Fair. Over time, it became obvious that one of the most popular stalls was the International Beer Tent run by D and E Huts. By the mid-1990s this had become the main focus, combined with a line-up of musical entertainments to keep the drinkers happy.

Twenty years after the first event, the Fair took the form of a Music Festival on Saturday, 29 October 1994.

1995 saw Village Fair with an Under The Water theme, aiming to support the State Emergency Service (SES) by donating profits in the aid of upgrading SES equipment.

A large loss (negative profits) was incurred in 1997 when the Fair moved from its home on JOV Green to a space near the campus Rugby Oval. As a result, the 1998 Fair had its funding pulled by the university leaving the volunteer group to move the music venue into the University Bar and place the stalls on the Library Lawn.

In 1999, the venue again changed to University Hockey Fields, but the day was a washout due to heavy rain. A number of people suffered injuries due to drunken mud-sliding. The Fair moved again to a greenfield site next to the JOV dam, where it has stayed until 2006.

2007 saw the event move to the base of the famous Mt. Panorama. The festival site is now more than double any previous site that has hosted Village Fair.

The increasing popularity of the event saw more than 2000 people attend 2011's Village Fair, which was headlined by Sparkadia and supporting acts Papa Vs Pretty, DJ Sampology, Ball Park Music, Bang Gang Deejays, and Owl Eyes.

== Artist lineups ==
Village Fair has attracted a number of popular upcoming Australian artists, most of which have gone on to have mainstream music careers, including Machine Gun Fellatio, Blue King Brown, The Basics, Ash Grunwald, Chaos Maths, Something for Kate, 28 Days, Kisschasy, Blue Juice, British India and Little Birdy.

The line-up has also featured several well-known DJs, including The Aston Shuffle, Bag Raiders, The Funky Punks, and The Purple Sneakers DJs.

2009 saw the event take a more mainstream direction in what was the biggest Village Fair to date. That year the line-up included Van She, Kid Confucius, Snob Scrilla, Cloud Control, Bag Raiders, The Bakery, The Sundance Kids, True Vibenation, Girl In The Red Light, and local CSU talent Horse & Lewi, Boylo & Will, and Go! Go! Machiner.

=== 2001 ===
- Machine Gun Fellatio
- Fatt Dex
- The Star System
- Pleasantville
- Gang Awry
- Dent
- Bianca Disco feat. Mr Bianca

=== 2002 ===
- Waikiki
- Dave McCormack and The Polaroids

=== 2003 ===
- Something For Kate
- Gelbison
- Civic

=== 2004 ===
- Sonic Animation
- The Beautiful Girls
- Iota
- Between then and Now
- National Pornographic
- Chaos Maths

=== 2005 ===
- Magic Dirt
- Gerling
- After the Fall
- The Panda Band
- Something with Numbers
- Bluejuice
- 2-Up
- The Lyrical Madmen
- The Oceans
- Chaos Maths

=== 2006 ===
- Little Birdy
- 28 Days
- True Live
- Bodyjar
- TZU
- Paul Greene
- Casual Projects
- Chaos Maths
- Over Pass

=== 2007 ===
- Kisschasy
- Blue King Brown
- Ash Grunwald
- The Basics
- Dukes of Windsor

=== 2008 ===
- The Aston Shuffle
- Bag Raiders
- British India
- Bluejuice
- The Jezabels
- Cassette Kids
- The Filthy Rich
- Beats Working
- The Charlie Lions
- DJ Zudix
- Radiophobia
- The Bakery
- The Camels
- Watussi
- First Light
- The Blank Blank's
- The References
- EQD
- Break Academy
- Sooty And Sweep
- People's Republic

=== 2009 ===
- Van She
- Kid Confucius
- Cloud Control
- Bag Raiders
- The Sundance Kids
- Purple Sneakers DJs
- Snob Scrilla
- The Bakery
- True Vibenation
- Go! Go! Machiner
- Girl in the Red Light
- Horse & Lewi
- Boylo & Will

=== 2010 ===
- Miami Horror
- Yves Klein Blue
- The Only
- The Melodics
- Beni
- Hey Now
- Redcoats
- Brittle
- [me]
- Lovers Jump Creek
- Bloody Lovely Audrey
- Treeboi & Kone

=== 2011 ===
- Sparkadia
- Sampology
- Papa Vs Pretty
- Bang Gang Deejays
- Owl Eyes
- Ball Park Music
- The Snowdroppers
- Stonefield (band)
- The Ruminaters
- Lime Cordiale
- Sticky Fingers
- The Nectars

=== 2012 ===
- Sneaky Sound System
- The Potbelleez
- Pez (musician)
- Rainbow Rd
- Peacock Dreams
- Gambit
- Bloody Lovely Audrey
- Mo Slabs
- Anti Prophet
- DJ Mrcian
- Doin A Bit DJs
- DJ Fish
- DJ Benny
- Broken Neck of the Woods
- Get Wet

=== 2013 ===
- Yacht Club DJs
- Draft & N'Fa
- Strange Talk
- The Gris wolds
- Foley & Van C
- Peacock Dreams
- Gun face
- Ben Largely
- Rainbow Rd
- Blue Red Army

== See also ==
- List of historic rock festivals
- List of festivals in Australia
