= Red Dog (Pilbara) =

Pilbara Wanderer and Dog of Northwestern Australia

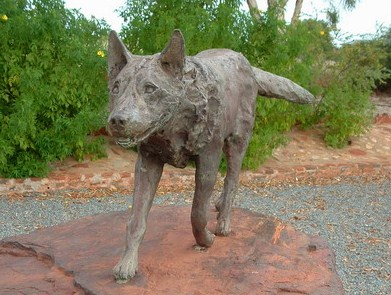
- Red Dog statue.
- Other names: Bluey; Blue; Dog of the Northwest; Tally
- Species: Canis familiaris
- Breed: kelpie/cattle dog crossbreed dog
- Sex: Male
- Born: Tally Ho; 1971; Paraburdoo, Western Australia
- Died: 21 November 1979 (aged 7–8); Karratha, Western Australia
- Resting place: Secret location, Roebourne, Western Australia
- Known for: Travelling throughout Western Australia's Pilbara region
- Title: The Pilbara Wanderer
- Owners: Colin Cummings (former); John Stazzonelli (former)

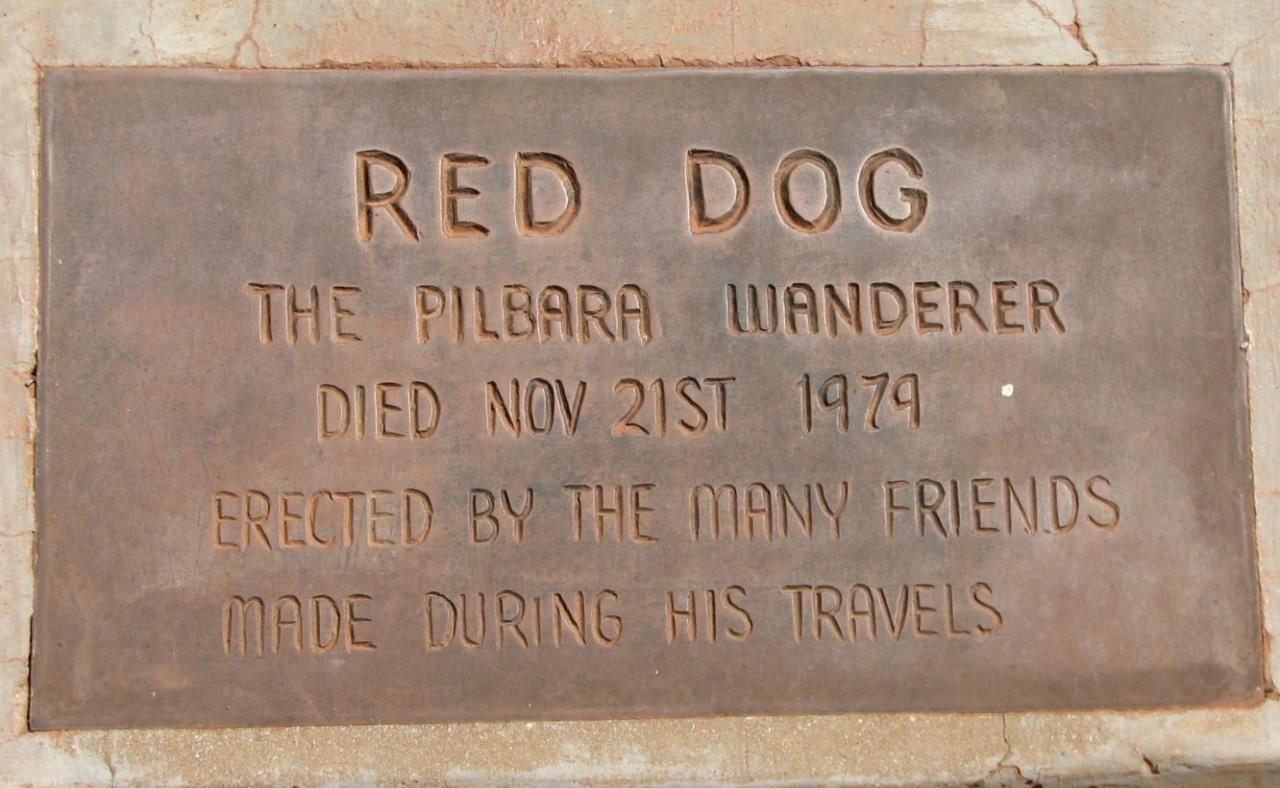
The Pilbara Wanderer

Red Dog (c. 1971 – 21 November 1979) was a kelpie/cattle dog cross that was well known for his travels through Western Australia's vast Pilbara region. Red Dog had a series of owners and lengthy periods travelling on his own, essentially becoming a beloved friend and mascot of the greater Pilbara community. A statue was installed in his memory in Dampier, one of the towns to which he often returned. He is frequently referred to as a "red kelpie" or a "red cloud kelpie".

== Story ==
Red Dog was believed to have been born in the town of Paraburdoo, Western Australia in 1971.

Red Dog was called by a variety of names by those who knew him, including Bluey, Tally Ho, and Dog of the Northwest. Tally Ho was his first name, given to him by Colin Cummings, who is believed to have been his first owner, and brought him to Dampier. The nickname "Red Dog" has been attributed to the red dirt of the Pilbara region (although "red dog" is a common nickname for red kelpies and heelers, much in the same way as "blue dog" or "Bluey" is a common nickname for the Australian Cattle Dog). In the movie Red Dog: True Blue, the name Bluey was given to him after a storm as Red Dog was covered in bluish mud.

His second owner was John Stazzonelli, a bus driver with Hamersley Iron, who took the dog with him in his bus. With Stazzonelli, Red Dog travelled as far as Perth, Broome, Roebourne, Point Samson and Port Hedland.

Following Stazzonelli's death in 1975, Red Dog spent a lot of time travelling on his own. He was also taken in by many members of the community, and a veterinarian who treated him. Each time he visited the vet, it was with a new owner. Red was made a member of the Dampier Salts Sport and Social Club and the Transport Workers' Union, and was also given a bank account with the Bank of New South Wales, which was said to have used him as a mascot, with the slogan "If Red banks at the Wales, then you can too."

Although Red Dog was well liked, it is believed that he was deliberately poisoned in 1979 with strychnine.

Red Dog was buried, by veterinarian Rick Fenny, in a secret unmarked grave around Roebourne, Western Australia. There is a plaque, fixed to a boulder, very close to where Red Dog was buried, about 3.7 kilometres (2.3 mi) outside of the town of Cossack, WA. Fenny's book Pip – My first red kelpie talks about his time with Red Dog.

== Legacy ==
Soon after Red's death, Australian author Nancy Gillespie wrote and compiled anecdotes and poetry written by several people of the Pilbara region for her 1983 book Red Dog, as did Beverly Duckett in her 1993 book, Red Dog: the Pilbara Wanderer.

Red Dog's story and statue have caught the attention of a number of people passing through Dampier, including British author Louis de Bernières. He wrote a book loosely based on Red's legend, called Red Dog. A four-wheel drive club has been named in his honour.

De Bernières's novel was adapted as a critically acclaimed feature film about Red. It was made in Australia and released in August 2011. Based on a screenplay by Daniel Taplitz, it is directed by Kriv Stenders. The title role was played by Koko. In 2016 a prequel was released, Red Dog: True Blue, which imagines an origin story for Red Dog. de Bernières also wrote a novel called Blue Dog to go with the prequel film.

== See also ==
- List of individual dogs
- Balto, sled dog
- Bob the Railway Dog, an Australian precursor
- Bobbie the Wonder Dog, journey home dog
- Dog on the Tuckerbox
- Hachikō, Japanese faithful dog
- Just Nuisance, Great Dane and able seaman
- Owney, postal dog
- Rags, doughboy dog
- Sergeant Stubby, WWI war dog
- Togo, sled dog
