= Kriv Stenders =

Australian writer, producer, and director

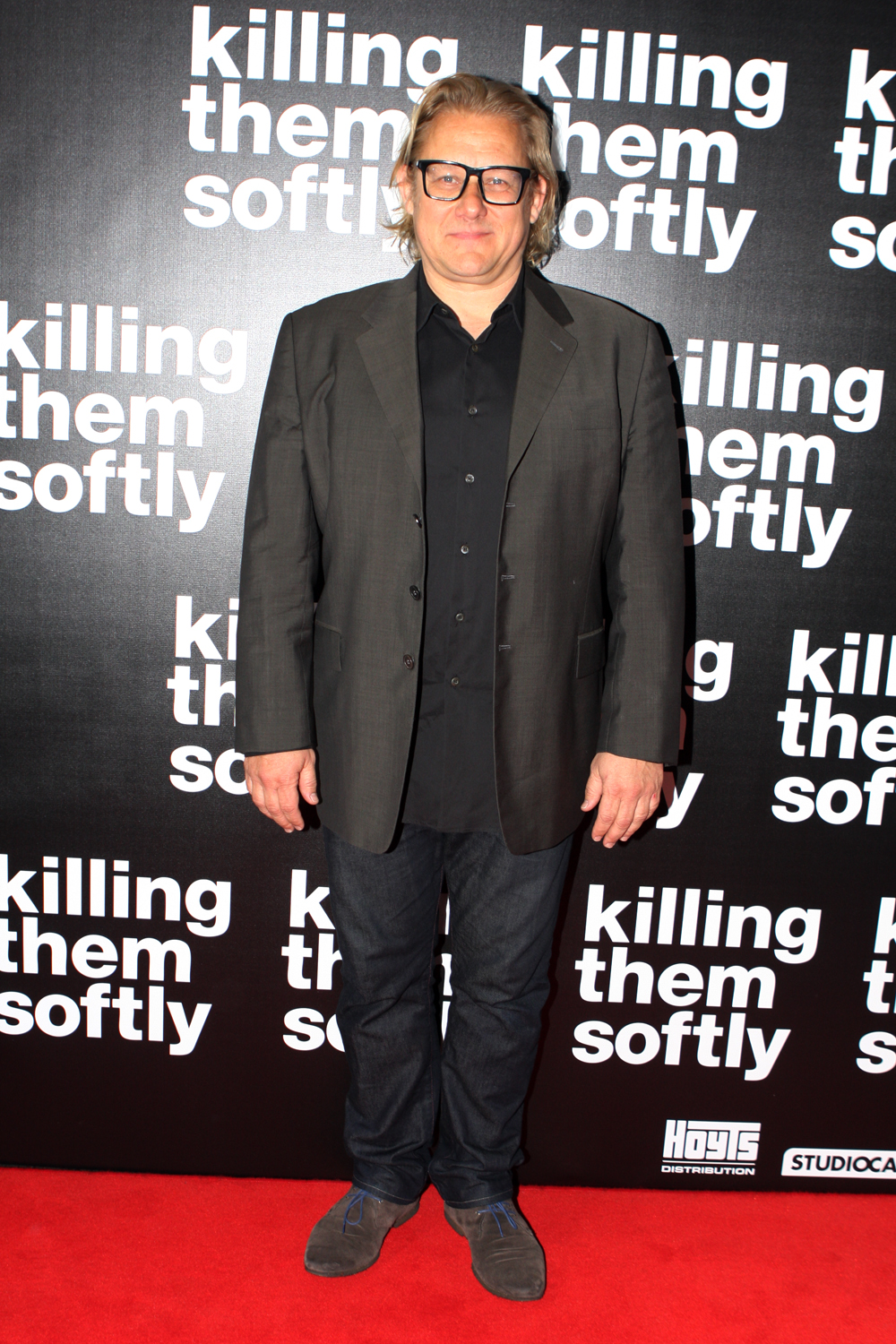
- Stenders 2012
- Born: Brisbane, Queensland, Australia
- Occupations: Film director, screenwriter, film producer

Kriv Stenders is an Australian writer, film producer, and director, best known for his 2011 film Red Dog (2011) and the 2014 thriller film Kill Me Three Times. His new film The Correspondent, based on a memoir by Australian journalist Peter Greste, had its world premiere on the opening gala night of the Adelaide Film Festival on 23 October 2024.

In his early career, he made many music videos for well-known Australian rock musicians and bands, including The Go-Betweens, later the subject of a feature-length documentary.

== Early life and education ==
Kriv Stenders was born in Brisbane, Queensland. He is of Latvian heritage on one side of the family. He subsequently lived on the Gold Coast, then in the Brisbane suburbs of Kenmore, Toowong, and later Annerley.

He attended high school in Toowong. He met The Go-Betweens at a record store in Toowong, and became friends with them.

In 1989 he graduated from the Australian Film, Television and Radio School.

== Career ==
Between 1987 and 1994, Stenders began by directing music videos for many famous Australian bands and musicians, including Angry Anderson, Mental As Anything, Ian Moss, The Go-Betweens, Choirboys, Noiseworks. John Farnham, Single Gun Theory, Ratcat, and 1927.

During this time, he also made short-form films and TV commercials, via his company Prod Films. In 1994, he made the documentary short-feature Motherland, exploring the Latvian and Australian heritage of his two grandmothers.

In 2002, he shot his first feature film, the micro-budget, self-finance film Blacktown. The film stars Stenders friend Tony Ryan as an aboriginal bus driver who falls in love with a woman in a relationship with a married man. The film was screened at the Sydney Film Festival in 2005 and won the audience award in the sidebar section.

In February 2007, Boxing Day premiered at the Adelaide Film Festival.

His film Red Dog was released in 2011. As of 17 November 2011, it had made more than A$21 million at the Australian box office since opening in August 2011. Eleven days after opening, Red Dog became the highest-grossing Australian film of 2011. It has won numerous awards.

He wrote and directed a feature documentary film about The Go-Betweens, called The Go-Betweens: Right Here, the title based on their 1987 song "Right Here". The film had a cinema release in 2017, as well as being showcased at Splendour In The Grass.

His film The Correspondent, based on journalist Peter Greste's memoir The First Casualty and starring Richard Roxburgh, had its world premiere on the opening gala night of the 2024 Adelaide Film Festival.

== Other activities ==
As of 2024 Stenders is an ambassador for SmartFone Flick Fest (SF3), a film festival held annually in Sydney.

== Filmography (selected) ==
=== Music videos ===
- "Streets Of Your Town" - 1988, The Go-Betweens, music video

=== Films ===
- Motherland (1994)
- The Illustrated Family Doctor (2005)
- Blacktown (2005)
- Boxing Day (2007)
- Lucky Country (2009)
- Red Dog (2011)
- Kill Me Three Times (2014)
- Red Dog: True Blue (2016)
- Australia Day (2017)
- The Go-Betweens: Right Here (2017; documentary)
- Danger Close: The Battle of Long Tan (2019)
- Slim and I (2020)
- The Correspondent (2024)

=== Television ===
- Wake in Fright (2017 miniseries)
- Mother and Son (2023)

== Awards ==
=== Australian Academy of Cinema and Television Arts (AACTA) Awards ===
Year	Nominated work	Category	Result	Ref
2012	Red Dog	Best Direction	Nominated	
2015	The Principal, episode 1	Best Direction in a Television Drama or Comedy	Nominated	
2026	The Correspondent	Best Direction	Nominated	

=== Australian Directors Guild ===
Year	Nominated work	Category	Result	Ref
2007	Boxing Day	ADG Award for Best Direction in a Feature Film	Nominated	
2012	Red Dog	ADG Award for Best Direction in a Feature Film	Nominated	

=== Australian Film Institute Awards ===
Year	Nominated work	Category	Result	Ref
1998	Two/Out	Best Short Fiction Film	Won	
2005	The Illustrated Family Doctor	Best Screenplay, Adapted	Nominated	

=== Australian Screen Directors Association ===
Year	Nominated work	Category	Result	Ref
2005	The Illustrated Family Doctor	Best Direction of a First Feature Film	Nominated	

=== Berlin International Film Festival ===
Year	Nominated work	Category	Result	Ref
2017	Red Dog: True Blue	Generation Kplus - Best Film	Nominated	

=== Film Critics Circle of Australia Awards ===
Year	Nominated work	Category	Result	Ref
2005	The Illustrated Family Doctor	Best Screenplay - Adapted	Nominated	
2012	Red Dog	Best Director	Nominated	

=== Heartland Film Festival ===
Year	Nominated work	Category	Result	Ref
2017	Red Dog: True Blue	Narrative Feature	Won	

=== IF Awards ===
Year	Nominated work	Category	Result	Ref
2007	Boxing Day	Best Director	Nominated	
2011	Red Dog	Best Direction	Won	
2011	Red Dog	Best Feature Film	Won	

=== Melbourne International Film Festival ===
Year	Nominated work	Category	Result	Ref
1998	Two/Out	Best Australian Short Film	Won	

=== Montréal Festival of New Cinema ===
Year	Nominated work	Category	Result	Ref
2007	Boxing Day	Special Mention	Won	

=== Rencontres Internationales du Cinéma des Antipodes ===
Year	Nominated work	Category	Result	Ref
2012	Red Dog	Audience Award for Best Feature Film	Won	

=== TIFF Kids International Film Festival ===
Year	Nominated work	Category	Result	Ref
2017	Red Dog: True Blue	Young People's Jury Award for Best Feature Film (Ages 8–10)	Won	

=== White Sands International Film Festival ===
Year	Nominated work	Category	Result	Ref
2012	Red Dog	Grand Jury Award	Won	
