= Australian Kelpie =

Dog breed

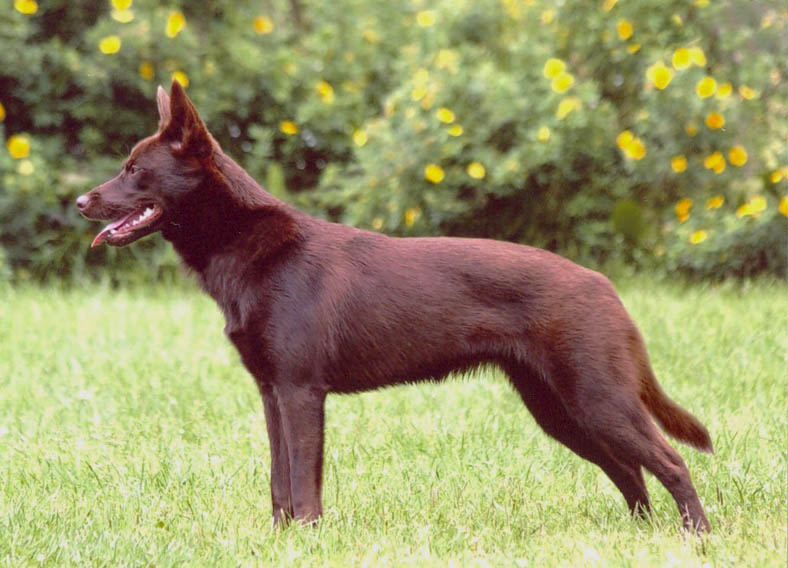
- An Australian Kelpie
- Other names: Kelpie, Barb
- Common nicknames: Farmer Dog
- Origin: Australia
Traits
- Height: 39–51 cm (15–20 in)
- Weight: 13–19 kg (29–42 lb)
- Coat: short double coat
- Colour: black, black and tan, red, red and tan, chocolate, chocolate and tan, blue, blue and tan, fawn, fawn and tan, cream, black and white
Kennel club standards
- ANKC: standard
- Fédération Cynologique Internationale: standard

The Australian Kelpie, or simply Kelpie, is an Australian sheepdog capable of mustering and droving with little or no guidance. It is a medium-sized dog and comes in a variety of colours. The Kelpie has been exported throughout the world and is used to muster livestock, primarily sheep, cattle and goats.

The breed has been separated into two distinct varieties: the Show (or Bench) Kelpie and the Working Kelpie. The Show Kelpie is seen at conformation dog shows in some countries and is selected for appearance rather than working instinct, while the Working Kelpie is bred for its working ability.

== History ==
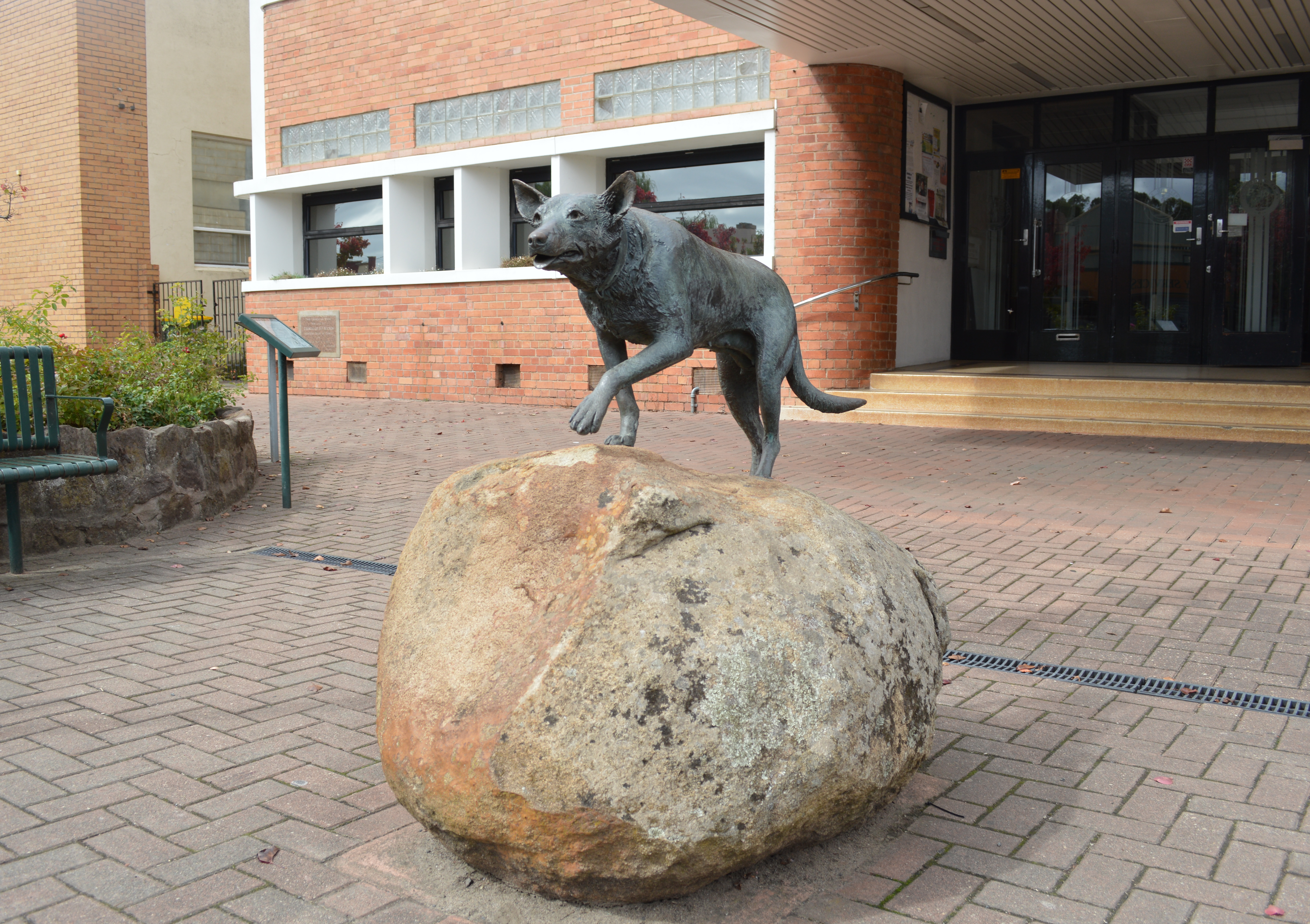
The Kelpie Monument in Casterton, "Birthplace of the Kelpie".

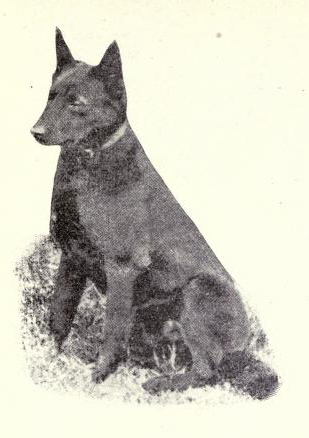
Kelpie circa 1915

The ancestors of most Kelpies were British dogs known loosely as collies (sometimes spelled colleys). These were mostly black, or very dark brown, dogs – hence the name collie, which has the same root as coal. (The official collie breeds were not formed until about 10 or 15 years after the Kelpie was established as a breed, and the first recognised Border Collie was not brought to Australia until after the Federation in 1901). Some collies were imported to Australia for stock work in the early 19th century, and were bred with other types of dogs – usually with an eye to working sheep without direct supervision.

A 1950 article in the Dungog Chronicle as an example, amongst a number of them that can be found in public archives, reports a then-popular account claiming that the first Kelpies descended from a deliberate cross between a smooth-haired Scottish Collie and a dingo around 1870. The story reflected a widespread belief of the time that Australian working dogs owed some of their hardiness to native dingo blood.

In May 2019, several media outlets reported that a University of Sydney genomic study had found “no dingo ancestry” in the Kelpie. However, the study’s lead author, Professor Claire Wade, later clarified that this interpretation was incorrect. The research compared some specific genes associated with the visible traits of the ear shape and coat colour but not the breed’s entire genome. Wade stated that she had never suggested there was “no dingo blood in the Kelpie breed,” explaining that the study merely showed no genetic link for those two characteristics which some people believed shows a relationship between the dingo and the kelpie.

The first dog known as a Kelpie was a black and tan female pup with floppy ears bought by Jack Gleeson about 1872 from a litter born on Warrock Station near Casterton, owned by George Robertson, a Scot. This dog was named after the kelpie, a mythological shapeshifting water spirit of Celtic folklore. In later years she was referred to as "(Gleeson's) Kelpie", to differentiate her from "(King's) Kelpie", her daughter.

The second "Kelpie" was "(King's) Kelpie", another black and tan bitch out of "Kelpie" by "Caesar", a pup from two sheepdogs imported from Scotland. "(King's) Kelpie" tied for the prestigious Forbes Trial in 1879, and the strain was soon popularly referred to as "Kelpie's pups", or just Kelpies. The King brothers joined another breeder, McLeod, to form a dog breeding partnership whose dogs dominated trials during 1900 to 1920.

An early Kelpie, Sally, was mated to Moss, a Smooth Collie, and she produced a black pup that was named Barb after The Barb, a black horse which had won the Melbourne Cup in 1866. Consequently, black Kelpies became known as Barb Kelpies or Barbs.

There were a number of Kelpies named Red Cloud. The first and most famous was John Quinn's Red Cloud in the early 20th century. In the 1960s, another Red Cloud became well known in Western Australia. This started the tradition in Western Australia of calling all Red or Red and Tan Kelpies, especially those with white chests, Red Cloud Kelpies. Other notable specimens include Gunner and Red Dog (c. 1971 – 21 November 1979), a Kelpie mix which was the subject of a movie, Red Dog, released in 2011.

Kelpies have been exported to many countries including Argentina, Canada, Italy, Korea, New Caledonia, New Zealand, Sweden, the United Kingdom and the United States for various pursuits.

By 1990, Kelpies had been trained as scent dogs with good success rates. In Sweden they have been widely used for tracking and rescue work.

== Appearance ==
The Kelpie is a soft-coated, medium-sized dog, usually with prick ears and an athletic appearance. Their coat colours include black, black and tan, red, red and tan, blue, blue and tan, fawn, fawn and tan, cream, black and blue, and white and gold. The Kelpie generally weighs 14–20 kg (31–44 lb) and measures 41–51 cm (16–20 in) at the withers. They can reach a maximum weight of 25–27 kg (55–60 lb).

=== Breed standards ===
Robert Kaleski published the first standard for the Kelpie in 1904. The standard was accepted by leading breeders of the time and adopted by the Kennel Club of New South Wales. Contemporary breed standards vary depending on whether the registry is for working or show Kelpies. It is possible for a dog to both work and show, but options for competition in conformation shows might be limited depending on ancestry and the opinions of the kennel clubs or breed clubs involved.

In Australia, there are two separate registries for Kelpies. Working Kelpies are registered with the Working Kelpie Council (WKC) and/or the Australian Sheepdog Workers Association. The WKC encourages breeding for working ability, and allows a wide variety of coat colours. Show Kelpies are registered with the Australian National Kennel Council, which encourages breeding for a certain appearance and limits acceptable colours. The wide standards allowed by the WKC mean that many Working Kelpies do not meet the standard for showing.

In the US, the Kelpie is not recognised as a breed by the American Kennel Club (AKC). However, the United Kennel Club and the Canadian Kennel Club recognise the Kelpie and allow them to compete in official events. As of 2015, Australian Kelpies have been accepted by the AKC as Herding Dogs allowed to compete in AKC sanctioned Sheep Herding Trials.

=== Working Kelpie ===
The Working Kelpie comes in three coat types: short, smooth and rough. The coat can be almost any colour from black to light tan or cream. Some Kelpies have a white blaze on the chest, and a few have white points. Kelpies sometimes have a double coat, which sheds out in spring in temperate climates. Agouti is not unusual, and can look like a double coat.

Working Kelpies vary in size, ranging from about 19–25 in (48–64 cm) and 28–60 lb (13–27 kg).

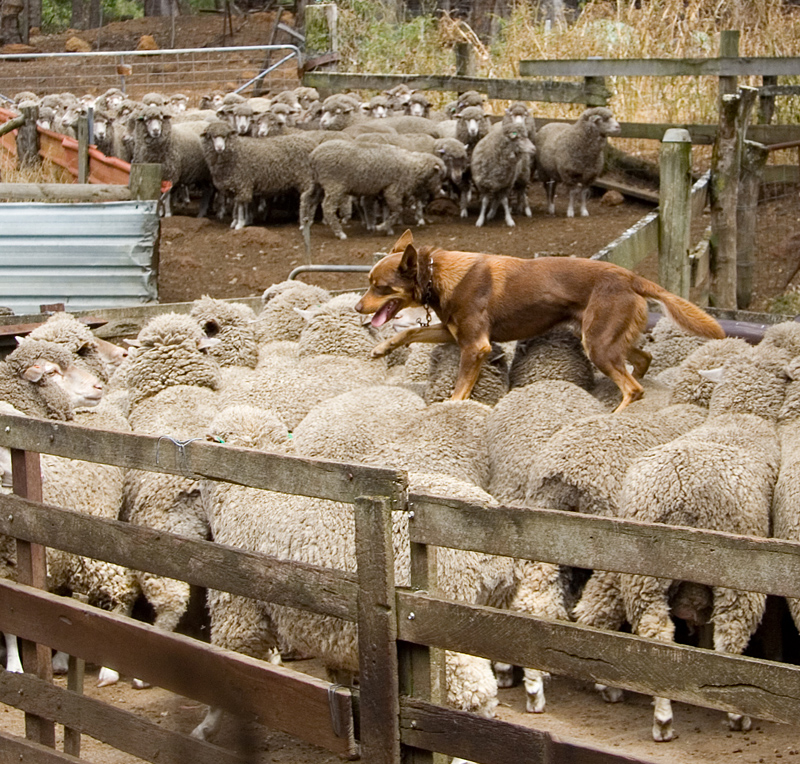
Kelpie "backing" sheep

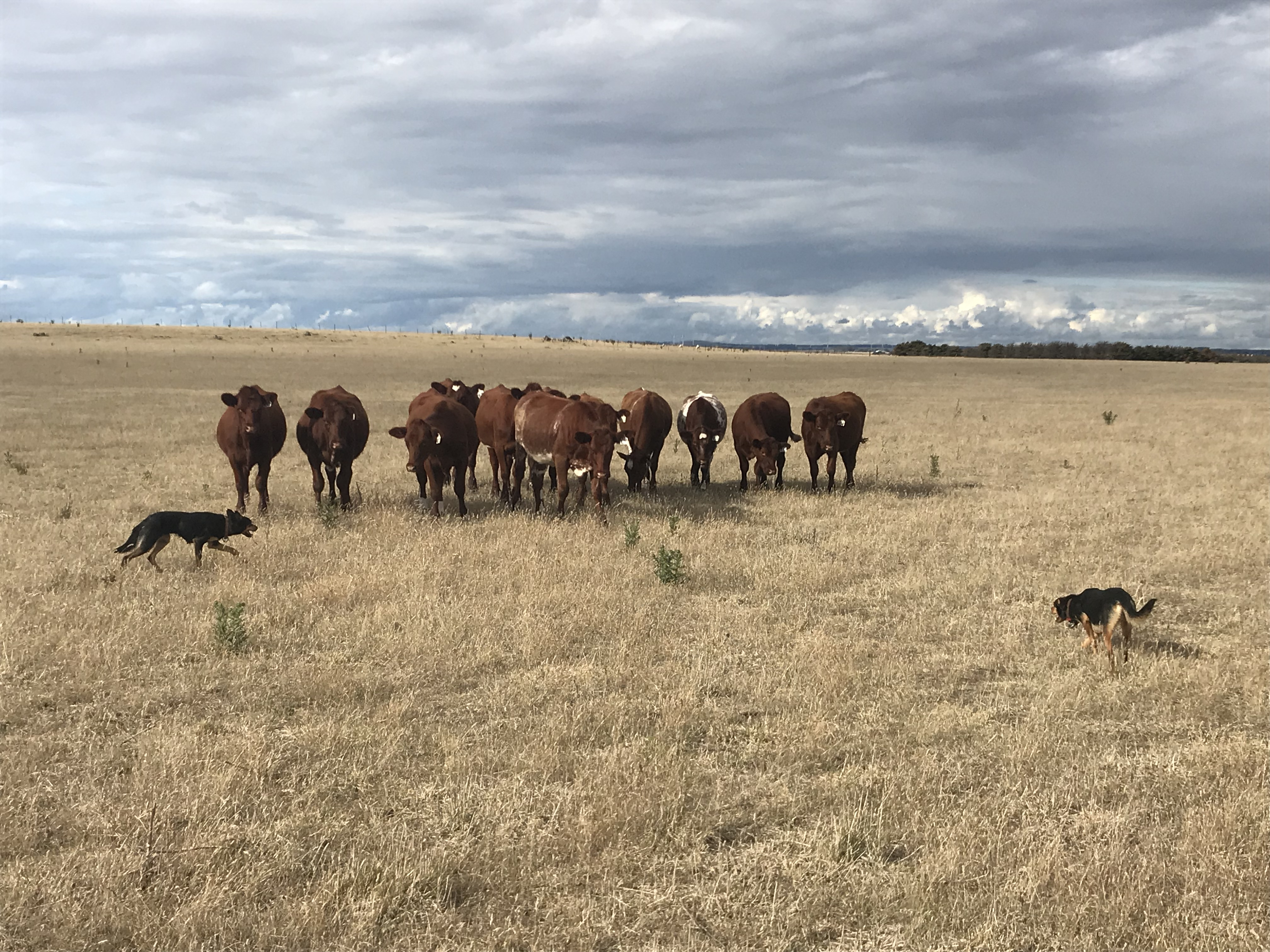
Two kelpies working shorthorn heifers

Working Kelpies can be efficient workers that can save farmers and graziers the cost of several hands when mustering livestock. (Note: The record price paid for a kelpie as at 2021 is A$32,500.) They prevent stock from moving away from the stockman. This natural instinct is crucial when mustering stock in isolated gorge country, where a dog will silently move ahead of the stockman and block up the stock (usually cattle) until the rider appears. Kelpies have natural instincts for managing livestock. They will work sheep, cattle, goats, pigs, poultry, and other domestic livestock. The Kelpie's signature move is to jump on the backs of sheep and walk across the tops of the sheep to reach the other side and break up the jam. Kelpies compete and are exhibited in livestock working trials, ranging from yards or arenas to large open fields working sheep, goats, cattle, or ducks.

=== Show Kelpie ===
Kelpies that are bred under the ANKC registrations are registered for show (Main Register) only in the following colours: Black, Chocolate, Red, Smoky Blue, Fawn, Black and Tan, and Red and Tan. They have a double coat and pricked ears. The other colours can be registered as pets and sporting dogs (Limited Register): Blue and Tan, Fawn and Tan and Yellow/Cream. Kelpies were first exhibited in the early 20th century, at the Sydney Royal Easter Show. ANKC "Show" Kelpies are now becoming very popular both nationally and internationally as family pets, companion dogs, running mates and sport dogs due to their trainability, good nature and low maintenance of care and can be found all over the world.

== Temperament ==
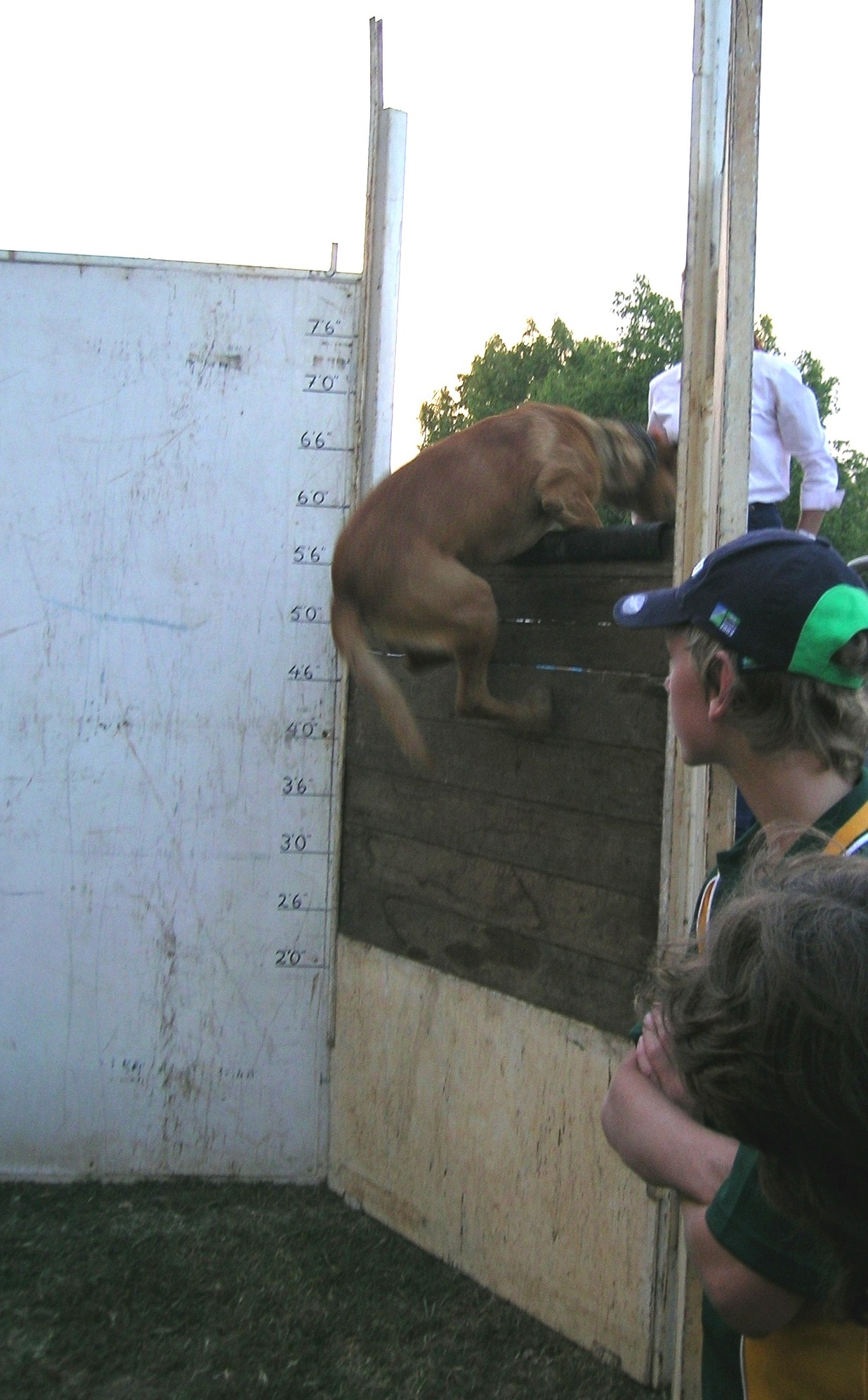
Kelpie competing in a dog jumping class

Show Kelpies generally excel in agility trials and may be shown in conformation in Australia.

Kelpies are intelligent and easy to train dogs making them good-tempered and good pets, especially with children. However they require a lot of physical exercise and mental stimulation, otherwise they can become bored and hence be disruptive by constantly barking or digging, or by chewing on objects. Working Kelpies are often described as "workaholics", with a strong drive to herd.

== Health ==
Kelpies are a hardy breed with few health problems, but they are susceptible to disorders common to all breeds, such as cryptorchidism, hip dysplasia, cerebellar abiotrophy and luxating patella. Research is underway to find the genetic marker for cerebellar abiotrophy in the breed.

A 2024 UK study found a life expectancy of 12 years based on a sample of 49 deaths for the breed compared to an average of 12.7 for purebreeds and 12 for crossbreeds.

== Notable Kelpies ==
A 30-year-old Kelpie owned by a Victorian dairy farmer, Maggie, was thought to be the world's oldest dog at her time of death.

=== In popular culture ===
A Black and Tan Kelpie, named Roy, is featured in the Australian drama series McLeod's Daughters, while another Black and Tan Kelpie, named Turbo (offspring of Roy), appears in the series several years later.

A Red Kelpie boy and one of Bluey's best friends, Rusty, is featured in the show Bluey. Rusty is joined by older brother Digger and younger sister Dusty.

The film The Fall Guy features a Kelpie.

A Kelpie named Dart portrays the dog, Frankie (Francesca Camilla Kelpington III), in the Australian-British crime drama television series, Return to Paradise.

== Show coat colours ==
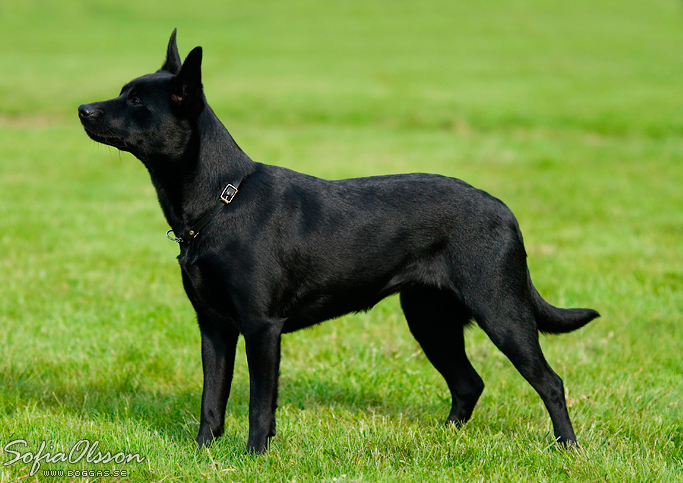
Black Kelpie

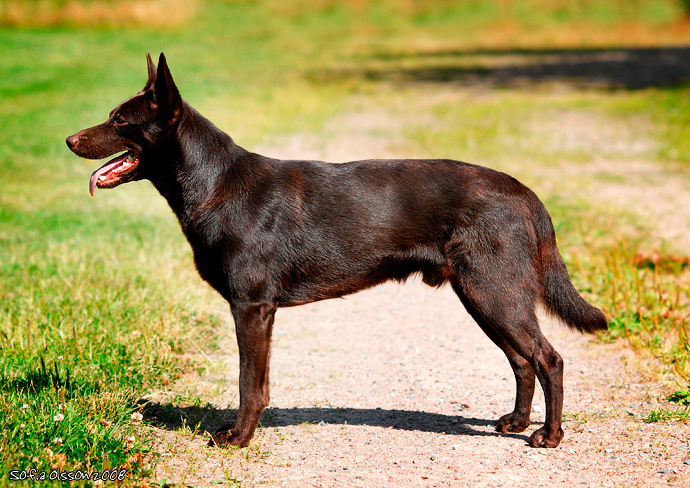
Chocolate Kelpie

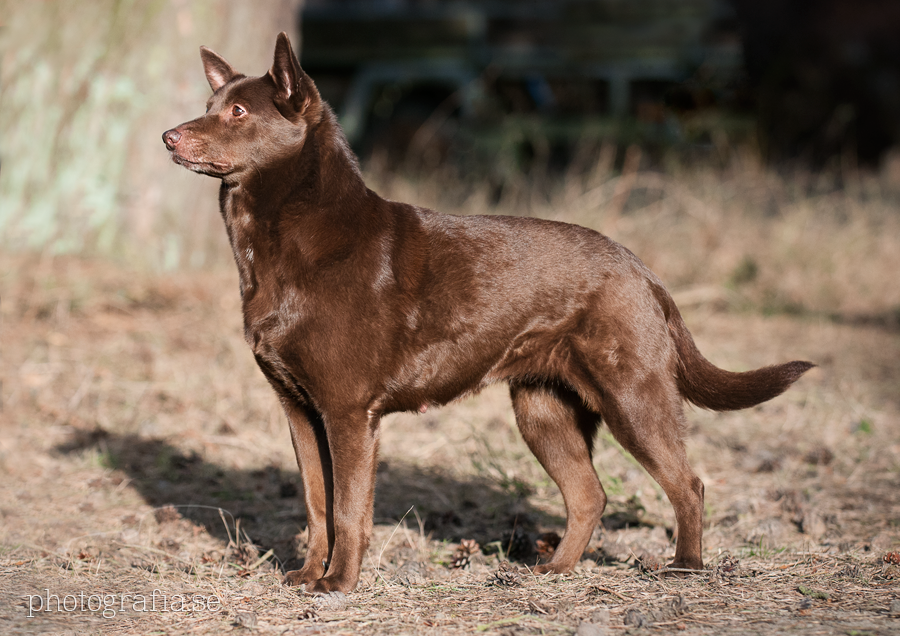
Red Kelpie

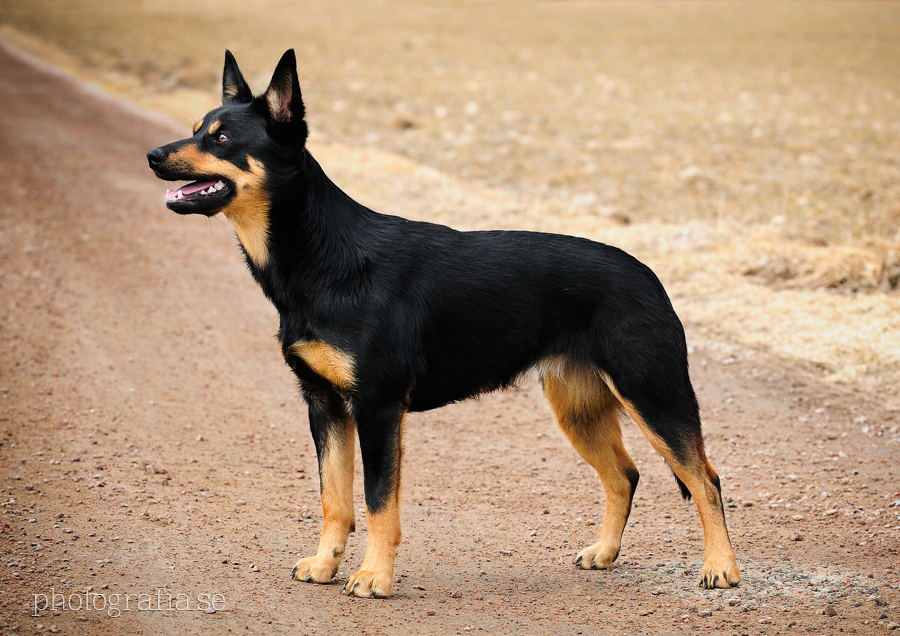
Black and Tan Kelpie

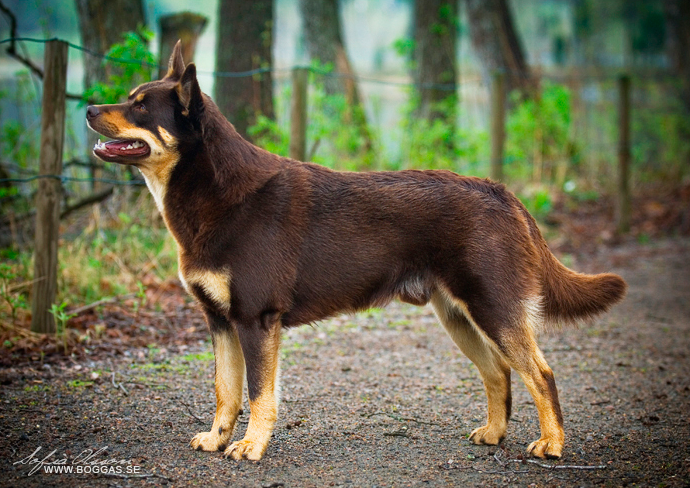
Red and Tan Kelpie

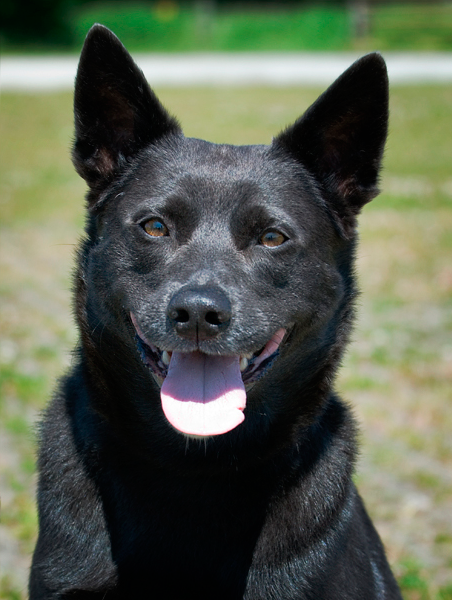
Smoky Blue Kelpie

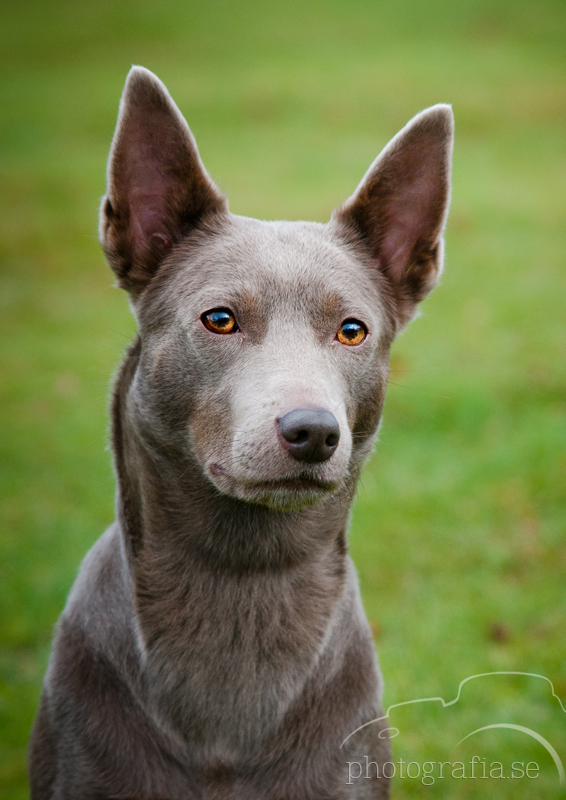
Fawn Kelpie

== See also ==
- Australian Cattle Dog
- Australian Shepherd
- Australian Stumpy Tail Cattle Dog
- Koolie
- List of dog breeds
- Sheep husbandry
- Working Group (dogs)
