= Feist (dog type) =

Dog crossbreed

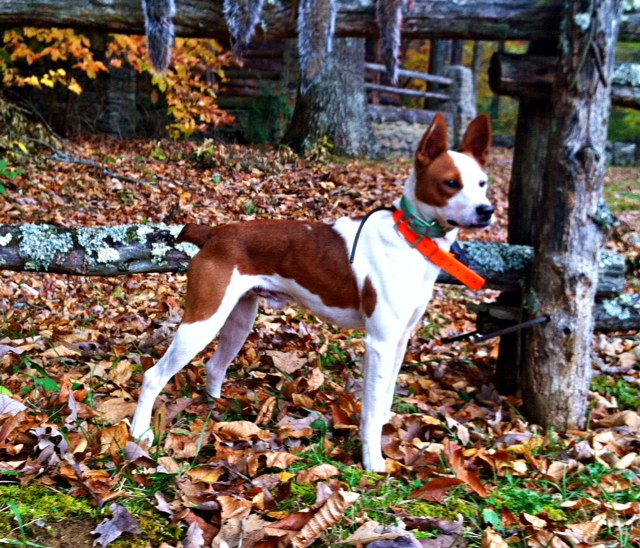
- Atomic Flash, an example of a feist dog
- Other names: Treeing Feist, Treeing Terrier, Ratting Terrier, Rat Terrier
- Origin: United States

A feist is a small hunting dog. This group descended from the terriers brought over to the United States by British miners and other immigrants. These terriers probably included crosses between the Smooth Fox Terrier, the Manchester Terrier, and the now-extinct English White Terrier. These dogs were used as ratters, and gambling on their prowess in killing rats was a favorite hobby of their owners. Some of these dogs have been crossed with Greyhounds, Whippets or Italian Greyhounds (for speed), and Beagles or other hounds (for hunting ability) – extending the family to include a larger variety of purpose than the original ratter, or Rat Terrier.

== Description ==
Feists are small to medium-sized dogs 10 to 18 in (25 to 46 cm) tall, and weigh 15 to 30 lb (6.8 to 14 kg), short-coated dogs with long legs. The ears are set high on the head and are button, erect, or short hang. The tail can be natural, bobtail, or docked. As feists are bred for hunting, not as show dogs, little to no consistency is seen in appearance (breed type), and they may be purebred, crossbred, or mixed-breed dogs. They are identified more by the way they hunt and their size than by their appearance. Similar looking and behaving cross breed dogs are Lurchers, albeit somewhat larger.

Individual dogs can hunt in more than one way, but in general, feists work above ground to chase small prey, especially squirrels. This contrasts with terriers or Dachshunds, earth dogs that go to ground to kill or drive out the prey, usually rodents, rabbits, foxes, or badgers. Most feists have an extreme drive to chase rabbits, along with squirrels and other rodents.

When hunting, feists, unlike hounds, are mostly silent on track until they tree a squirrel. They locate squirrels using their eyes, ears, and nose, then tree them barking loudly and circling the tree, in the same manner that a coonhound trees raccoons. When they have treed a squirrel, they chase the squirrel until it leaves their sight. During the chase, they wade through streams, leap over logs, and dash across roads to get to their prey. Leashing these dogs in the presence of squirrels is advisable. Although they put up a furious chase, feists rarely catch squirrels; they typically expect their owners to shoot them.

Various named varieties within the feist type have been developed, including the Mountain Feists, which includes the Baldwin Feist, Buckley Feist, DenMark Feist, Galla Creek Feist, Kemmer Feist, Lost Creek Feist, Sport-bred Feist, and Thornburg Feist. The Treeing Feists include the Atomic Feist, Barger Feist, Black Mouth Cur, Boggs Creek Feist, Original Cajun Squirrel Dog, Charlie Feist, Fleming Creek Squirrel Dog, Hickory Grounds Feist, Horse Creek Feist, Hurley Comb's-bred Feist, Mountain Cur, Mullins Feist, Redwood Feist, Riverun Feist, Shaderidge, and Rat Terrier.

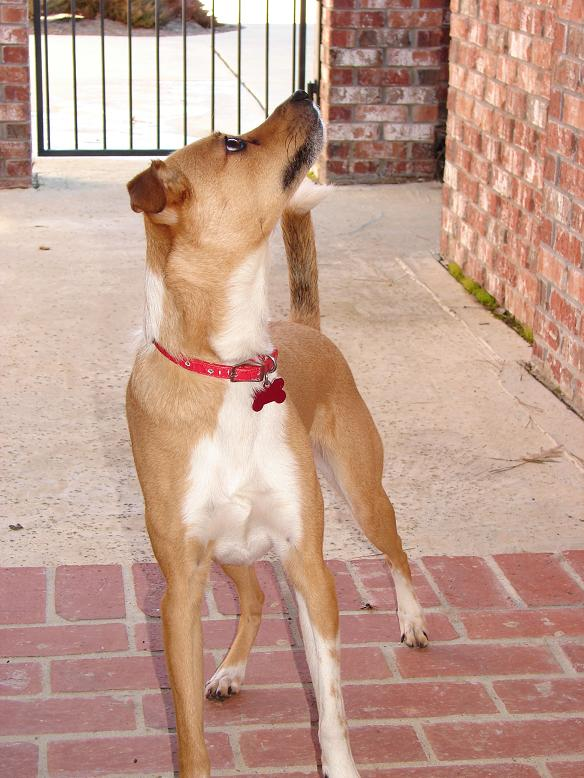
An example of a feist

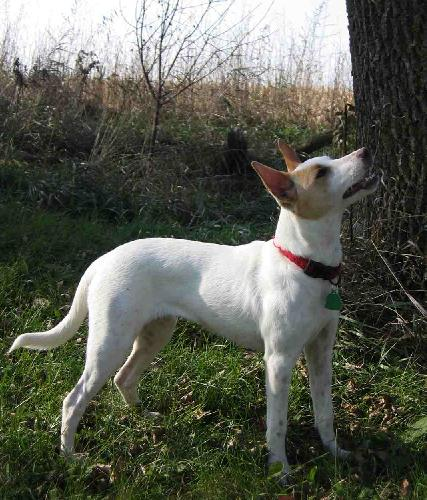
Gray's Prairie Daisy – an example of a Gray-bred Mountain Feist

== Etymology ==
The word "feist" is described in Webster's Third New International Dictionary as from the obsolete word "fysting", meaning "breaking wind, in such expressions as fysting dog or fysting hound". Feist is defined as "1. chiefly dial: a small dog of uncertain ancestry..."

The word feisty – "energetic, belligerent, esp. if small" – is derived from the dog, which is small and energetic.

== History ==
The feist is not a new type of dog. Written accounts of the dogs go back centuries, with several spelling variations seen. George Washington referred to them in his diary in 1770 when describing a dog as "a small foist-looking yellow cur". Abraham Lincoln wrote about the "fice" dog in his poem, "The Bear Hunt". William Faulkner mentions the "fice dog" in The Sound and the Fury, but uses the spelling "fyce" in the stories "Was" and "The Bear" from the collection Go Down, Moses: "a brave fyce dog is killed by a bear". In her 1938 novel The Yearling, author Marjorie Kinnan Rawlings uses the spelling of "feice" to refer to this dog. Claude Shumate, who wrote about the feist for Full Cry magazine, believed that the feist was descended from Native American dogs, mixed with small terriers from Britain, and was kept as early as the 17th century (Full Cry, December, 1987). The breed was popularized by President Teddy Roosevelt, who frequently hunted with a feist named Skip, belonging to his son Archie, and a Manchester Terrier named Jack, belonging to his son Kermit. See Teddy Roosevelt Terrier.

== Similar breeds ==
Similar dogs are the Smooth and Wire Fox Terriers, originally developed to flush out foxes for hunters in England (but now primarily kept for conformation showing and as pets), and the Jack Russell Terrier, used for ratting. Fox Terriers and feists are often predominantly white so as to be visible to hunters. Many other variants of this type exist, such as the Russell Terrier, Parson Russell Terrier and Rat Terrier, with many locally developed purebred dog breeds. The original fox terrier type was documented in England in the 18th century.

=== Mountain Feist and Jack Russell Terriers ===
Because of similarities in appearance, Mountain Feists are sometimes mistaken for Jack Russell Terriers, particularly in shelters and dog pounds. However, certain physical characteristics separate the two, and can be easy to identify to the trained eye. The coat of a feist is generally softer and smoother than that of a rough-coated Jack Russell. Its legs are longer and the tail of a Mountain Feist is usually shorter than that of a Jack Russell.

Despite some physical similarities, however, the behavior and temperament of a Mountain Feist and a Jack Russell are often quite different. Most feists are fairly quiet dogs, and lack the tendency toward excessive barking demonstrated by some Jack Russells and other hunting dogs. Jack Russells also tend to be more combative. Finally, while active, most Mountain Feists do not generally exhibit the frenetic energy of Jack Russells.

Some Mountain Feist bloodlines were indeed bred down from Jack Russell Terriers, crossing most likely with treeing dogs, such as Treeing Walker Hounds. Jack Russell traits often remain visible despite this crossbreeding. These descendants usually are mostly white in color with brown or black around the head and neck, with tall stand up, or button ears. These dogs usually hunt in packs in the Appalachian and Ozark Mountains. They use their eyes and ears exceptionally well.

=== Feist and Rat Terrier ===
Crossing of feist dogs has occurred since they are bred primarily for performance as hunting dogs. Despite considerable confusion, Mountain Feist or Treeing Feist dogs are their own unique breed, where Rat Terriers are considered a specific breed within the feist type. Because the word "feist" refers to a general type of dog just as "hound" and "terrier" refer to a group of breeds, Rat Terriers are still often called "feists." The terriers brought to the U.S. in the 1890s from England were crossed with feist dogs already there, in addition to some of the toy breeds (Toy Fox Terrier, Manchester Terrier, and Chihuahua), resulting in a smaller feist-type dog with a more uniform appearance.

== See also ==
- Carolina Dog
- Mongrel
