= John Hallam =

British actor (1941–2006)

- Signed photo of Hallam
- Born: John William Francis Hallam; 28 October 1941; Lisburn, County Antrim, Northern Ireland
- Died: 14 November 2006 (aged 65); Clifton, Oxfordshire, England
- Education: RADA
- Occupation: Actor
- Years active: 1965–2003
- Spouse: Vicky Brinkworth (m. 1966; div. 1992)
- Children: 4
- Relatives: Clive Mantle (cousin); Ian Wright (son-in-law)

John William Francis Hallam (28 October 1941 – 14 November 2006) was a British actor. He frequently played hard men or military types, and appeared in over 100 film, stage, and television roles between 1964 and 2003.

== Early life and education ==
Hallam was born to English parents in Lisburn, County Antrim, Northern Ireland in 1941. His father was a superintendent at the Port of London. Earlier in the year, Hallam's family had been evacuated to Northern Ireland to escape the London Blitz. His cousin was actor Clive Mantle.

On returning to England after the war, he boarded at St Albans School, before starting his working life in a London bank. Despite having a talent for mathematics, he said he was sacked for getting the figures right without being able to explain how he did so. As a result, he ended up selling deckchairs on the South Coast, where he eventually found acting work in repertory theatre. He enrolled in the Royal Academy of Dramatic Art in 1962, graduating in 1964.

== Career ==
=== Stage ===
Hallam began his professional stage career with Laurence Olivier's embryonic National Theatre Company, playing Salinas in The Royal Hunt of the Sun (1964, Chichester Festival Theatre and the Old Vic). He played the Stage Door Keeper in Trelawny of the 'Wells' (Old Vic, 1965). He was seen performing on television for the first time in 1967, in the small role of a watchman when the BBC screened the director Franco Zeffirelli's National Theatre production of Much Ado About Nothing (Old Vic).

Stage roles became infrequent when an unending flow of film and television work followed.

=== Film ===
On the big screen, he worked his way up from small roles as an officer in The Charge of the Light Brigade (directed by Tony Richardson, 1968) and a revolting Burpa tribesman in Carry On Up the Khyber (1968) to more substantial roles as Sir Meles of Bohemia in A Walk with Love and Death (the director John Huston's tale of 14th-century romance in France, 1969).

Over the years he appeared in many films including Where's Jack? (1969), The Last Valley, Villain, Nicholas and Alexandra, Murphy's War, and Quest for Love (1971), The Offence, Antony and Cleopatra (1972), Hennessy (1975), Trial by Combat (1976), The Four Feathers (1978), Love and Bullets (1979), Flash Gordon (1980), Dragonslayer (1981), Ivanhoe (1982), Santa Claus: The Movie (1985), When the Whales Came (1989), and the 1985 science-fiction cult film Lifeforce, directed by Tobe Hooper.

He appeared in Agatha Christie’s Miss Marple “4:50 from Paddington” as Cedric Crackenthorple. He also appeared as McTaggart in the director's cut of the 1973 film The Wicker Man. His later film roles included a Baron in Robin Hood: Prince of Thieves (1991) and as Mandara in Kull the Conqueror (1997).

=== Television ===
In 1973 he played the troubled Dr. Peter Conway in the science fiction series Moonbase 3. Later in the decade he appeared as "uncle" Harry Farmer, a former soldier who is invalided out of the army in the BBC Television First World War drama series, Wings (1977–1978).

Another notable television role was as Thomas Mallen in Catherine Cookson’s adaptation drama series The Mallens (1979).

He also appeared as "Gypsy Joe" in the Minder episode "In", (1982) and in the BBC's television adaptations of two tales from The Chronicles of Narnia: Prince Caspian and The Voyage of the Dawn Treader, from 1988 until 1990, and later starred as Ali Ben Hassad in the 1998 TV movie The Incredible Adventures of Marco Polo. He also appeared in the show Blackadder (1983 Season 1, Episode 6: The Black Seal) as Sir Wilfred Death.

He had a semi-regular role in the BBC soap opera EastEnders, playing prison inmate Barnsey Barnes, a character that appears as the cellmate of regular character Den Watts (Leslie Grantham) while he is serving time at the fictional Dickens Hill prison. Hallam appeared on the show between 1988 and 1990. In 1989 he appeared in the Doctor Who serial "Ghost Light" appearing as the memorable alien "Light".

== Personal life ==
Hallam married theatrical mask-maker Vicky Brinkworth in 1966, and they had four children together, but divorced in 1992 after twenty-six years of marriage.

Hallam’s daughter Nancy is married to former footballer, Ian Wright.

=== Death ===
On 14 November 2006, Hallam died of testicular cancer in Clifton, Oxfordshire, after a brief spell of ill health.
