= Pipper (dog) =

Dog associated with tourism

- Species: Canis familiaris
- Breed: Parson Russell Terrier
- Sex: Male
- Born: May 2016 (age 10); Urnieta, Spain
- Years active: 2018–present
- Known for: Travelling around Spain, Pipper en ruta
- Title: Tourism ambassador of the Regional Government of Castile and León
- Owner: Pablo Muñoz Gabilondo
- Pipper on Tour

Pipper (born May 2016) is a Parson Russell Terrier from Spain. With his owner Pablo Muñoz Gabilondo, he has toured Spain since 2018 to highlight dog-friendly tourist locations. His travels have been sponsored by corporations and by the Regional Government of Castile and León, which named him as a tourist ambassador. Pipper and Muñoz's experiences have been documented on their website, and on the television series Pipper en ruta on La 2 (2023–2024).

== Biography ==
Pipper was born in May 2016 at Borda Txiki, a country house in Urnieta in the Basque Country. In his first year, he was adopted by Pablo Muñoz Gabilondo, a journalist from nearby San Sebastián but resident in Madrid, who had never had a dog before. Muñoz found that few leisure facilities permitted dogs, and was inspired by canine travel ambassadors in other countries such as Japan that he saw on Instagram.

Muñoz made a list of 50 iconic destinations in Spain to test for their friendliness towards dogs. He found sponsors for his journey, including the Regional Government of Castile and León, Bayer, and public rail network Renfe. Their journey began in May 2018 in Salamanca, in Castile and León. Their 22,000 km journey ended in June 2019 in Toledo; Muñoz said that only one site in the city admitted Pipper, and that 5% of hotels permitted dogs, compared to national and European averages of 18% and 40%. From October, Muñoz and Pipper began another tour, starting with the region of El Bierzo in Castile and León. In the same month in the city of León, a comic book was launched with Pipper as a protagonist. The book sought to educate about the responsibility of dog ownership to prevent abandonment, and encourage the admission of dogs to tourist locations.

By October 2023, Pipper had toured for 50,000 km and visited one hundred locations. That month, RTVE announced the series Pipper en ruta for La 2, which would follow Muñoz and Pipper's travels. A second season was broadcast in January 2024.

== Recognition ==
In June 2018, Pipper was named a tourism ambassador by the Regional Government of Castile and León, as part of an initiative to bring visibility to tourism with dogs. In December 2020, a park for dogs was opened in Antequera in Andalusia. The park had dedications to nine notable dogs, including Pipper.
