= Clifton, Oxfordshire =

Hamlet in Oxfordshire, England

Coordinates: 51.983°N 01.289°W

Clifton
- Location within Oxfordshire
- OS grid reference: SP4831
  - London: 60 mi (97 km) SE
- Civil parish: Deddington
- District: Cherwell
- Shire county: Oxfordshire
- Region: South East
- Country: England
- Sovereign state: United Kingdom
- Post town: Banbury
- Postcode district: OX15
- Dialling code: 01869
- Police: Thames Valley
- Fire: Oxfordshire
- Ambulance: South Central
- UK Parliament: Banbury
- Website: Deddington Online

Clifton is a hamlet by the River Cherwell in Deddington civil parish about 6 miles (10 km) south of Banbury, Oxfordshire, England. Clifton is on the B4031 road between Deddington and Croughton, Northamptonshire.

== Chapels ==
A dependent chapel of Deddington parish church still existed in Clifton in 1523 but seems to have disappeared by the 17th century. A Methodist chapel was built in Clifton in about 1815. It was a small brick building and has since been demolished. The Methodists replaced it in 1869 with a new brick and stucco chapel with plain lancet windows. It was still in use for worship in the 1950s but was disused by 1983 and is now a private house. A new Church of England chapel of Saint James the Great was completed in 1853. The Diocese of Oxford declared the chapel redundant in and sold it for secular commercial use in 1974.

== Community ==
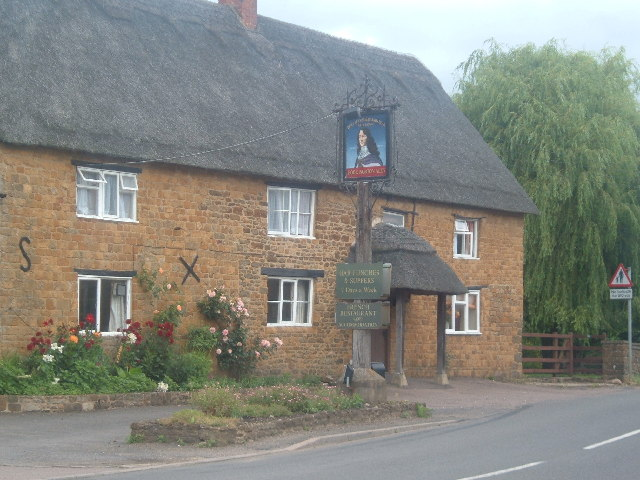
The Duke of Cumberland's Head

Clifton has a public house, the Duke of Cumberland's Head, which has recently re-opened with a new campsite and travelling caravan park. The Clifton dog actor Sykes (born c.2004), is owned by a local animal trainer. He has appeared as "Harvey" in Thinkbox marketing commercials, TV serials, and films. His advertisement for John Smith's Brewery saw him play "Tonto" against Peter Kay.

== Sources and further reading ==
- Allbrook, Michael; Forsyth, Robert (2011). A Parish at War; A military record of three Oxfordshire villages; Deddington — Clifton — Hempton. Oxford: Oxford Publishing Ltd. ISBN 978-1-870677-04-2.
- Allbrook, Michael; Forsyth, Robert (2012). A Parish at War; A military record of three Oxfordshire villages; Deddington — Clifton — Hempton; The Supplement. Oxford: Oxford Publishing Ltd.
- Baggs, A.P.; Colvin, Christina; Colvin, H.M.; Cooper, Janet; Day, C.J.; Selwyn, Nesta; Tomkinson, A. (1983). Crossley, Alan (ed.). A History of the County of Oxford, Volume 11: Wootton Hundred (northern part). Victoria County History.
