= Jack Russell (priest) =

British priest

The Reverend John "Jack" Russell
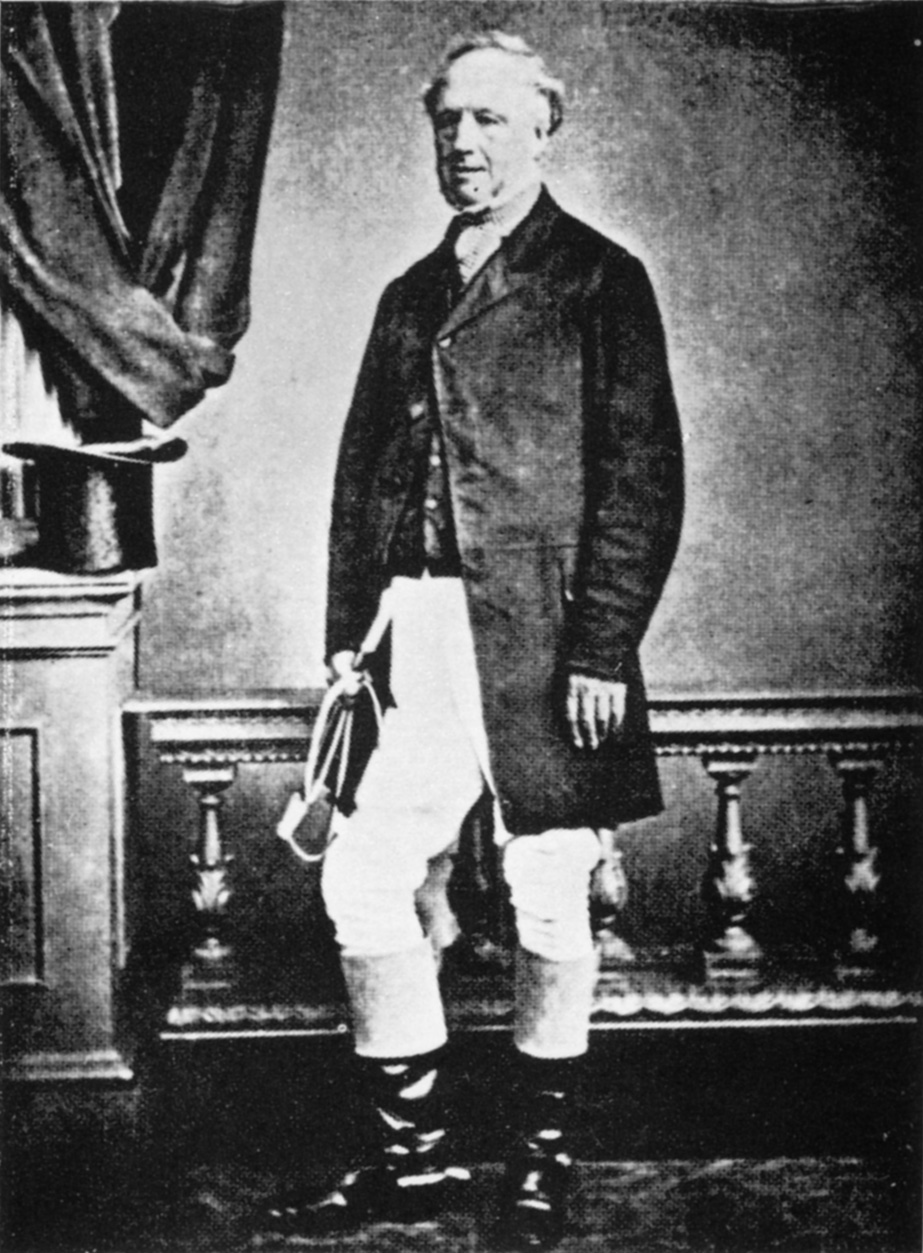
- Russell dressed in his hunting clothes, c.1883
- Born: 21 December 1795; Dartmouth, Devon, England
- Died: 28 April 1883 (aged 87); Black Torrington, Devon, England
- Resting place: Swimbridge, Devon, England
- Other name: The Sporting Parson
- Education: Exeter College, Oxford
- Known for: Dog breeder

John "Jack" Russell (21 December 1795 – 28 April 1883), was an English parson, dog breeder, and enthusiastic follower of country sports, particularly fox hunting. He was known as "The Sporting Parson".

Russell developed the Jack Russell Terrier and the Parson Russell Terrier, both of which are a variety of the Fox Terrier breed.

== Early life ==
Russell was born on 21 December 1795 in Dartmouth, South Devon, the eldest son of John Russell and Honor, nee Terrell.

His father, John, was a member of the clergy, holding parishes at Crediton, Iddesleigh, and Jacobstowe in Devon, and also St Juliot in Cornwall, and was himself the son of Michael who was Rector of Meeth. Jack's mother Honor was from the Terrell family, who had significant means, and following the marriage funding was made available for John Senior to open a school at Belmont House, Dartmouth, which was a boarding Grammar School for six "young gentlemen as boarders". It was whilst at Belmont House that the couple had their first two children, with older sister Nora born in 1793, followed by John in 1795. After the death of Honor's father, the couple moved to Calstock, Cornwall, and John Senior became the curate of Southill. During this time the couple had two further children – younger siblings to Jack – Michael and William.

Jack was educated at Plympton Grammar School, and in 1809 started attending his father's old school at Blundell's, Tiverton. Whilst at Blundell's he formed a scratch hunting pack of hounds, but this was seen as a serious infraction by the headmaster.

Jack left Blundell's at the end of the summer term in 1814. In late autumn, he attended Exeter College, Oxford, graduating with the lowest class of degree (a Third) on 15 December 1818. Whilst at university he hunted with the Heythrop Hunt, Old Berks Hunt, and the Bicester Hunt.

== Sporting career ==
According to local legend, it was at Exeter College where he spotted a little white terrier with dark tan spots over her eyes, ears and at the tip of her tail, who was owned by a local milkman in a nearby small hamlet, identified as either Elsfield or Marston. Russell bought the dog on the spot and this animal, called "Trump", became the foundation of a line of fox hunting terriers that became known as Jack Russell Terriers. They were well-suited by the shortness and strength of their legs for digging out foxes which had "gone to earth" having been hunted over-ground by fox hounds.

Russell was a founding member of The Kennel Club. He helped to write the breed standard for the Fox Terrier (Smooth) and became a respected judge. He did not show his own fox terriers on the conformation bench, saying that the difference between his dogs and the conformation dogs could be likened to the difference between wild and cultivated flowers.

He became a Master of Otter Hounds, and this is noted by George Templer of Stover, Master of the South Devon Foxhounds in a poem "A Party at Stover in 1823". Russell hunted regularly with the South Devon Hunt, despite living over 30 miles from the kennels. In 1828, he received a draft of six and a half couple (13) hounds from the Vine Hunt (now the Vine and Craven Hunt) and he became a Master of Foxhounds, maintaining his own pack until 1871. When Russell retired his hounds, his country was split between three packs – the Eggesford Hunt, the Torrington Farmer's Hunt, and Lord Poltimore's pack.

In 1823, Jack was a founder member of the Teignbridge Cricket Club, along with friend George Templer.

== Clerical career ==
Russell was ordained as a deacon in 1819 and started as curate at South Molton, and became a priest in 1820. After six years he moved to Iddesleigh which was his father's old parish.

In 1832, Russell was appointed a permanent curacy of Swymbridge-cum-Traveller's Rest (now Swimbridge) on the edge of Exmoor in North Devon. At Swimbridge, Russell enjoyed a hectic social life, with formal dining, charity fundraising, and active participation as a Freemason. The local public house still stands, and is called "The Jack Russell".

Russell stayed at Swimbridge for nearly 50 years before accepting the rectory at Black Torrington, at the urging of Lord Poltimore. The noted Historian WG Hoskins described Russell as "futile".

== Marriage ==
In 1826, at Swimbridge he married Penelope Incledon-Bury, third daughter and co-heiress of Vice-Admiral Richard Incledon-Bury (1757-1825), Royal Navy, lord of the manor of Colleton, Chulmleigh in Devon, who resided at Dennington, Swimbridge, and was also a keen fox hunter.

On 29 May 1827, a year and a day after they were married, the couple had a child, named John Bury, who died soon after and was buried on 31 May. Their second child was born on 23 August 1828, and called Richard Bury.

Russell is said to have had expensive sporting habits both on and off the hunting-field, which drained the substantial resources of his heiress wife and left the estate of Colleton in poor condition.

Penelope died on the eve on their fiftieth wedding anniversary, in 1876.

== Death and burial ==
Russell died on 28 April 1883 at Black Torrington Receptory, and was buried in the churchyard of St. James's Church, Swimbridge, where he had served as vicar for nearly 50 years.

== See also ==
- Jack Russell Terrier
- Parson Russell Terrier
- Russell Terrier
