= Jack Russell Terrier =

Small terrier dog breed

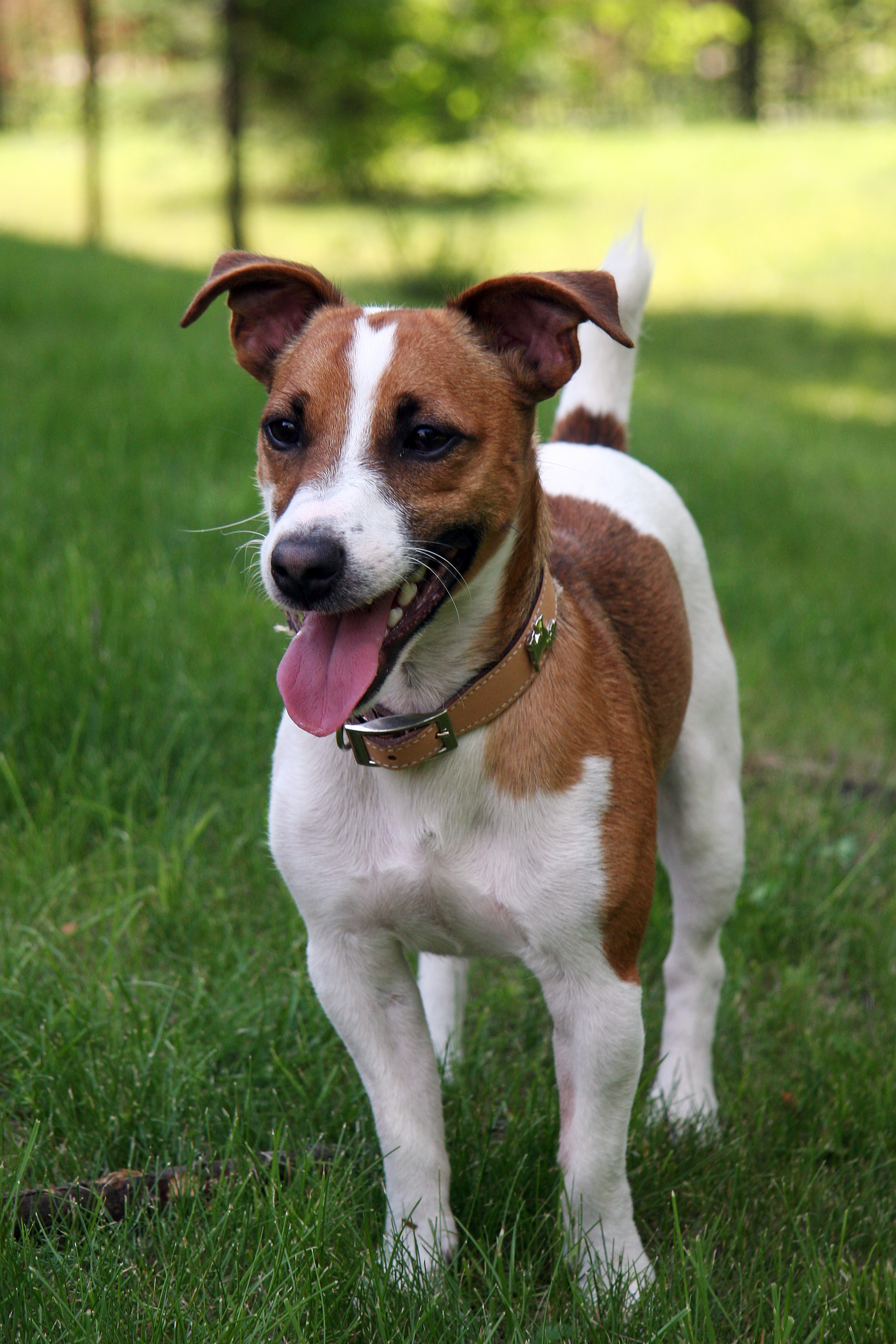
- Origin: United Kingdom
Traits
- Height: ideal: 25–30 cm (10–12 in)
- Weight: 5–6 kg (11–13 lb)
- Coat: smooth, rough or broken
- Colour: predominantly white, with patches of tan or black
Kennel club standards
- The Kennel Club: standard
- Fédération Cynologique Internationale: standard

The Jack Russell Terrier is a British breed of small terrier. It is principally white-bodied and may have a smooth, rough, or broken coat, with markings of various colours.

It derives from dogs bred and used for fox-hunting in North Devon in the early nineteenth century by a country parson, Jack Russell – for whom the breed is named – and has similar origins to the modern Fox Terrier. Though closely similar, it is a distinct and different breed from the Parson Russell Terrier.

Jack Russells are an energetic breed that rely on a high level of exercise and stimulation. It has gone through several changes over the years, corresponding to different use and breed standards set by kennel clubs. Recognition by kennel clubs for the Jack Russell breed has been opposed by the breed's parent societies – which resulted in the breeding and recognition of the Parson Russell terrier. Jack Russells have appeared many times in film, television, and print – with several historical dogs of note.

== History ==
=== Sporting parson ===
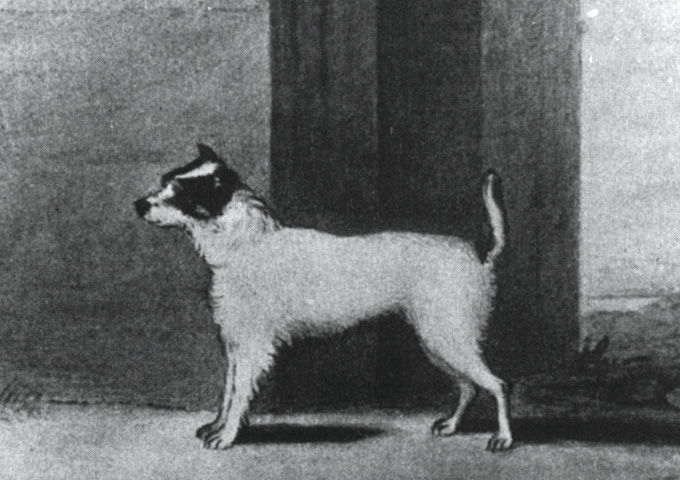
A drawing of Trump, the dog purchased by the Rev. John Russell.

The small white fox-working terriers were first bred by the Reverend John "Jack" Russell, a parson and hunting enthusiast born in 1795, and they can trace their origin to the now extinct English White Terrier. Difficulty in differentiating the dog from the creature it was pursuing brought about the need for a mostly white dog, and so in 1819 during his last year of university at Exeter College, Oxford, he purchased a small white and tan terrier female named Trump from a local milkman in the nearby small hamlet of Elsfield or Marston. Trump epitomised his ideal Fox Terrier, which, at the time, was a term used for any terrier which was used to bolt foxes out of their burrows. Her colouring was described as "...white, with just a patch of dark tan over each eye and ear; whilst a similar dot, not larger than a penny piece, marks the root of the tail." Davies, a friend of Russell's, wrote: "Trump was such an animal as Russell had only seen in his dreams". She was the basis for a breeding program to develop a terrier with high stamina for the hunt as well as the courage and formation to chase out foxes that had gone to ground. By the 1850s, these dogs were recognised as a distinct breed.

An important attribute in this dog was a tempered aggressiveness that would provide the necessary drive to pursue and bolt the fox, without resulting in physical harm to the quarry and effectively ending the chase, which was considered unsporting. Russell was said to have prided himself on the fact that his terriers never tasted blood. This line of terriers developed by John Russell was well respected for those qualities, and his dogs were often taken on by hunt enthusiasts. It is unlikely, however, that any dogs alive today can be proved to be descendants of Trump, as Russell was forced to sell all his dogs on more than one occasion due to financial difficulties and had only four aged (and non-breeding) terriers left when he died in 1883.

The Fox terrier and Jack Russell terrier type dogs of today are all descended from dogs of that period. However, documented pedigrees earlier than 1862 have not been found. Several records remain of documented breeding by John Russell between the 1860s and 1880s. The Fox Terrier Club was formed in 1875 with Russell as one of the founder members; its breed standard was aspiration, and not a description of how the breed appeared then. By the start of the 20th century, the Fox Terrier had altered more towards the modern breed, but in some parts of the country the old style of John Russell's terriers remained, and it is from those dogs that the modern Jack Russell type has descended.

Many breeds can claim heritage to the early Fox Terrier of this period, including the Brazilian Terrier, Japanese Terrier, Miniature Fox Terrier, Ratonero Bodeguero Andaluz, Rat Terrier, and Tenterfield Terrier.

=== After John Russell ===
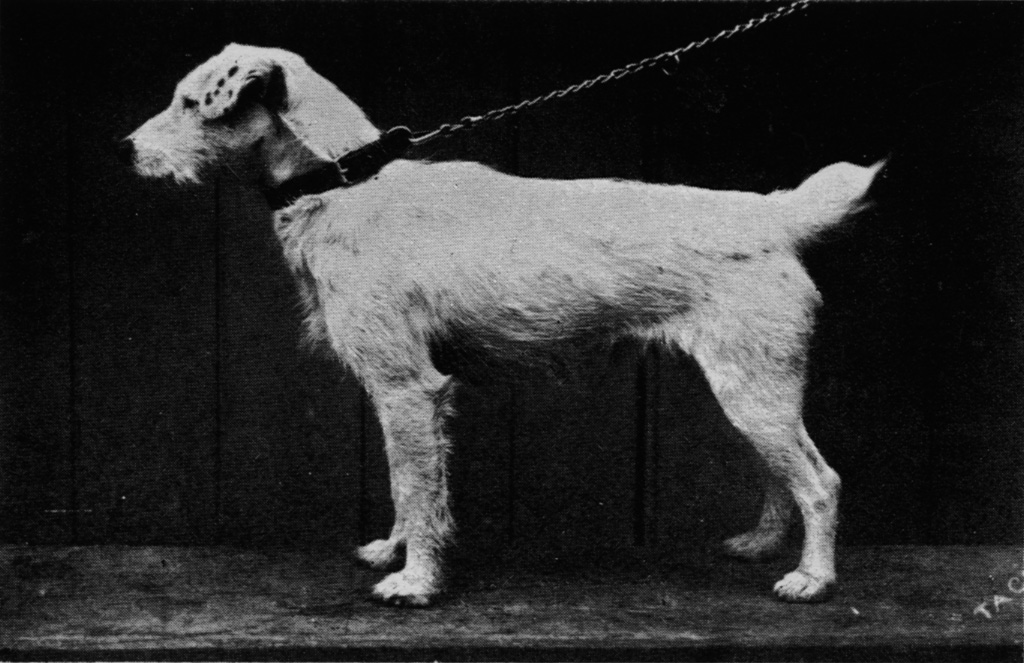
Carlisle Tack, a Fox terrier born in 1884, who was owned by John Russell.

Following Russell's death, the only people who made serious efforts to continue those strains were two men, one in Chislehurst with the surname of East, and another in Cornwall named Archer. East, at one point, had several couples, all of which were descended from one of Russell's dogs. The type aimed for were not as big as the show Fox Terrier and were usually less than 7 kg (15 lb).

Arthur Blake Heinemann created the first breed standard and, in 1894, he founded the Devon and Somerset Badger Club, the aims of which were to promote badger digging rather than fox hunting, and the breeding of terriers suitable for this purpose. Terriers were acquired from Nicholas Snow of Oare, and they were likely descended from Russell's original dogs, as Russell would probably have hunted at some point with Snow's hunting club and is likely to have provided at least some of their original terriers. By the turn of the 20th century, Russell's name had become associated with this breed of dog.

The club was later renamed the Parson Jack Russell Terrier Club. Badger digging required a different type of dog than fox hunting, and it is likely that Bull Terrier stock was introduced to strengthen the breed, which may have caused the creation of a shorter legged variety of Jack Russell terrier that started to appear around this period. At the same time that a split was appearing between show and working Fox terriers, a further split was occurring between two different types of white terrier, both carrying Jack Russell's name. Heinemann was invited to judge classes for working terriers at Crufts with an aim to bring working terriers back into the show ring and influence those that disregard working qualities in dogs. These classes were continued for several years by various judges, but Charles Cruft dropped the attempt as the classes were never heavily competed. Following Heinemann's death in 1930, the kennel and leadership of the club passed to Annie Harris, but the club itself folded shortly before World War II.

=== Post-World War II ===
Following World War II, the requirement for hunting dogs drastically declined, and with it the numbers of Jack Russell terriers. The dogs were increasingly used as family and companion dogs.

The Jack Russell Terrier Club of America (JRTCA) was formed in 1976 by Ailsa Crawford, one of the first Jack Russell terrier breeders in the United States. Size ranges for dogs were kept broad, with the ability of working dogs awarded higher than those in conformation shows. An open registry was maintained, with restricted line breeding. Registration for the club is made at adulthood for Jack Russells, rather than at birth, to ensure the breed's qualities remain, given the open registry.

Several breed clubs appeared in the United Kingdom during the 1970s to promote the breed, including the Jack Russell Club of Great Britain (JRTCGB) and the South East Jack Russell Terrier Club (SEJRTC). The JRTCGB promoted the range of sizes that remain in its standards today, whereas the SEJRTC set a minimum height for dogs at 33 cm (13 in). While the JRTCGB sought to ensure that the breed's working ability remained through non-recognition with other breed registries, the SEJRTC activity sought recognition with the UK Kennel club. In 1983, the Parson Jack Russell Club of Great Britain (PJRTCGB) was resurrected to seek Kennel Club recognition for the breed. Although the application was initially rejected, a new standard was created for the PJRTCGB based on the standard of the SEJRTC, and under that standard the breed was recognised by the Kennel Club in 1990 as the Parson Jack Russell terrier. Jack was dropped from the official name in 1999, and the recognised name of the breed became the Parson Russell Terrier.

In the late 1990s, the American Kennel Club explored the possibility of recognising the Jack Russell Terrier. This move was opposed by the Jack Russell Terrier Club of America as they did not want the breed to lose its essential working characteristics. The Jack Russell Terrier Breeders Association formed and petitioned the AKC; the breed's admission was granted in 2001. Under the AKC-recognised standard, the size of the breed was narrowed from the previous club's standard, and the name of the AKC-recognised Jack Russell Terrier was changed to Parson Russell Terrier, with the Jack Russell Terrier Breeders Association renamed to the Parson Russell Terrier Association of America.

The Australian National Kennel Council (ANKC) and the New Zealand Kennel Club (NZCK) are some of national kennel associations that register both the Jack Russell terrier and the Parson Russell terrier; however, the size requirements for the Jack Russell terrier under both those standards would classify a dog as a Russell terrier in the United States. In 2009, there were 1073 Jack Russells registered with the ANKC, compared to 18 for the Parson Russell terrier. Other modern breeds are often mistaken for modern Jack Russell terriers, including their cousin the Parson Russell terrier, the Tenterfield terrier, and the Rat Terrier. Several other modern breeds exist that descended from the early Fox Terrier breed, including the Brazilian Terrier, Japanese Terrier, Miniature Fox Terrier, Ratonero Bodeguero Andaluz, Rat Terrier, and Tenterfield Terrier.

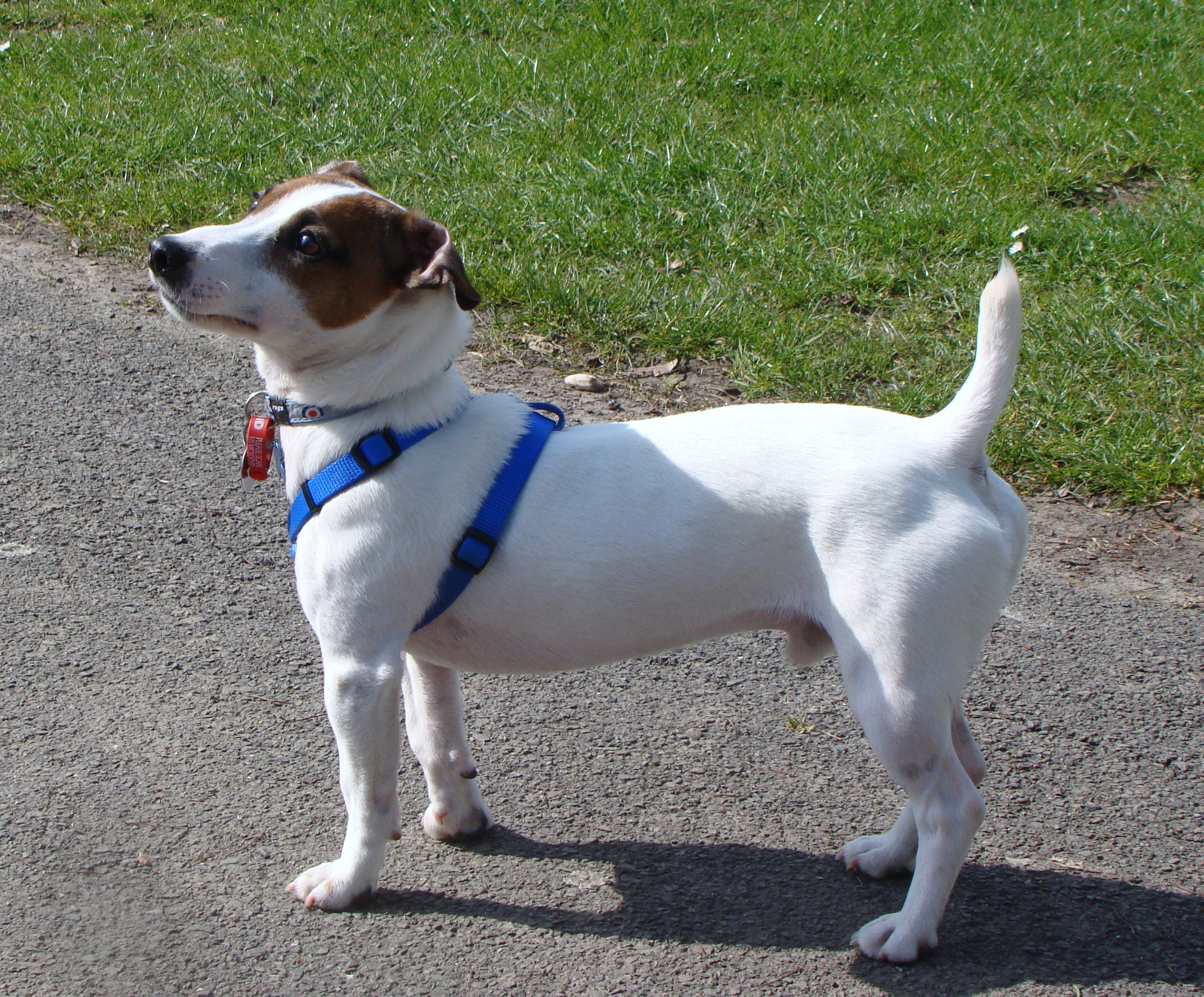
A Jack Russell terrier wearing a dog harness

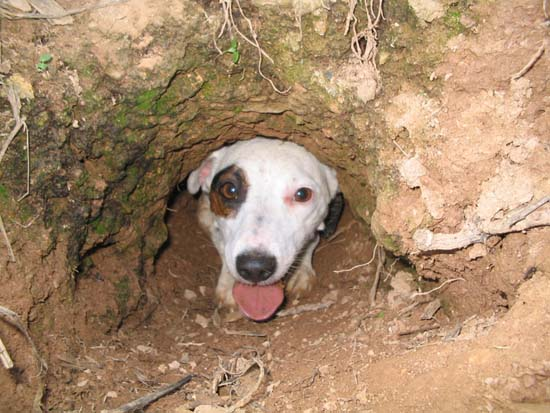
A working Jack Russell terrier exits a den pipe

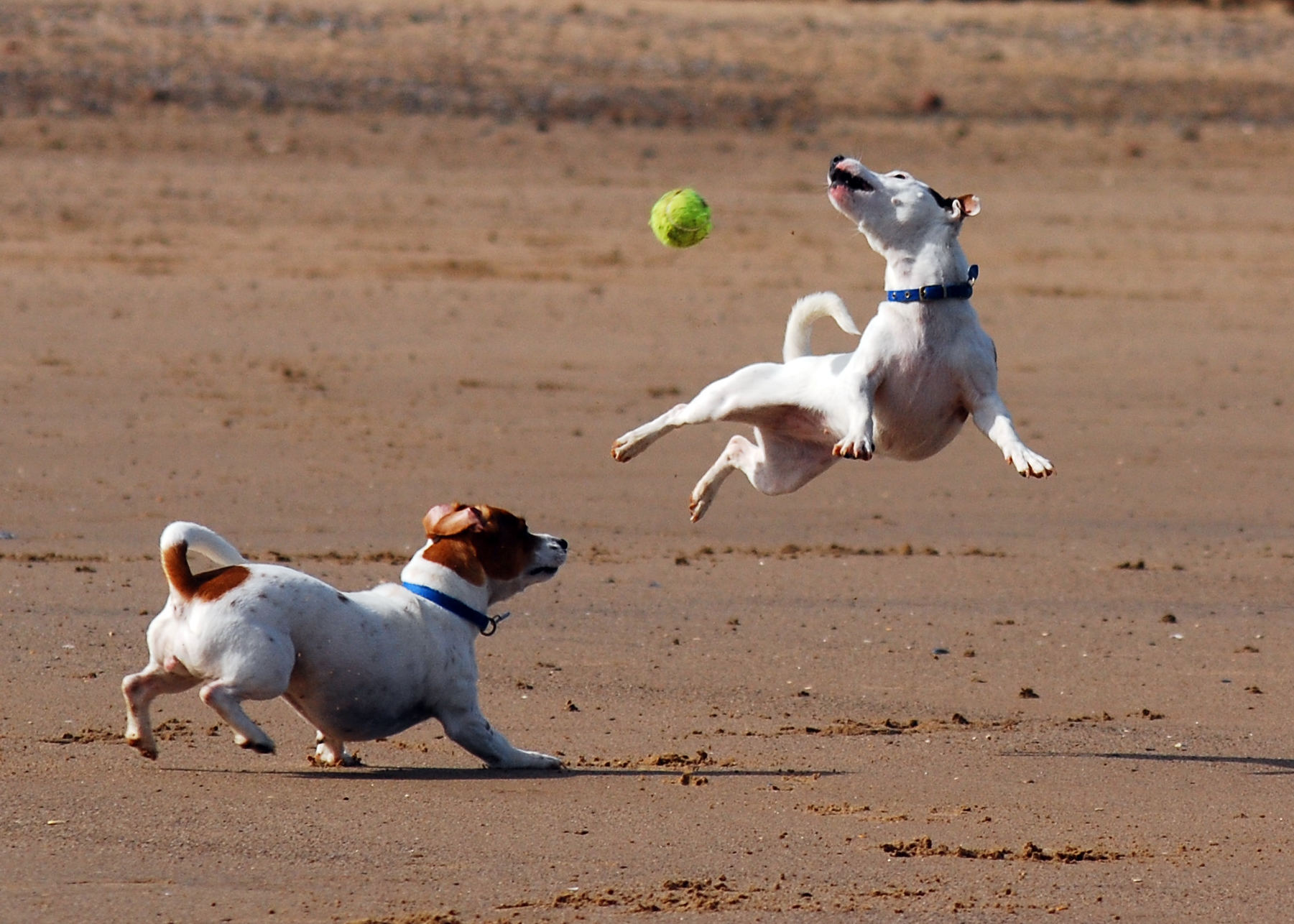
Jack Russell Terriers playing with a ball

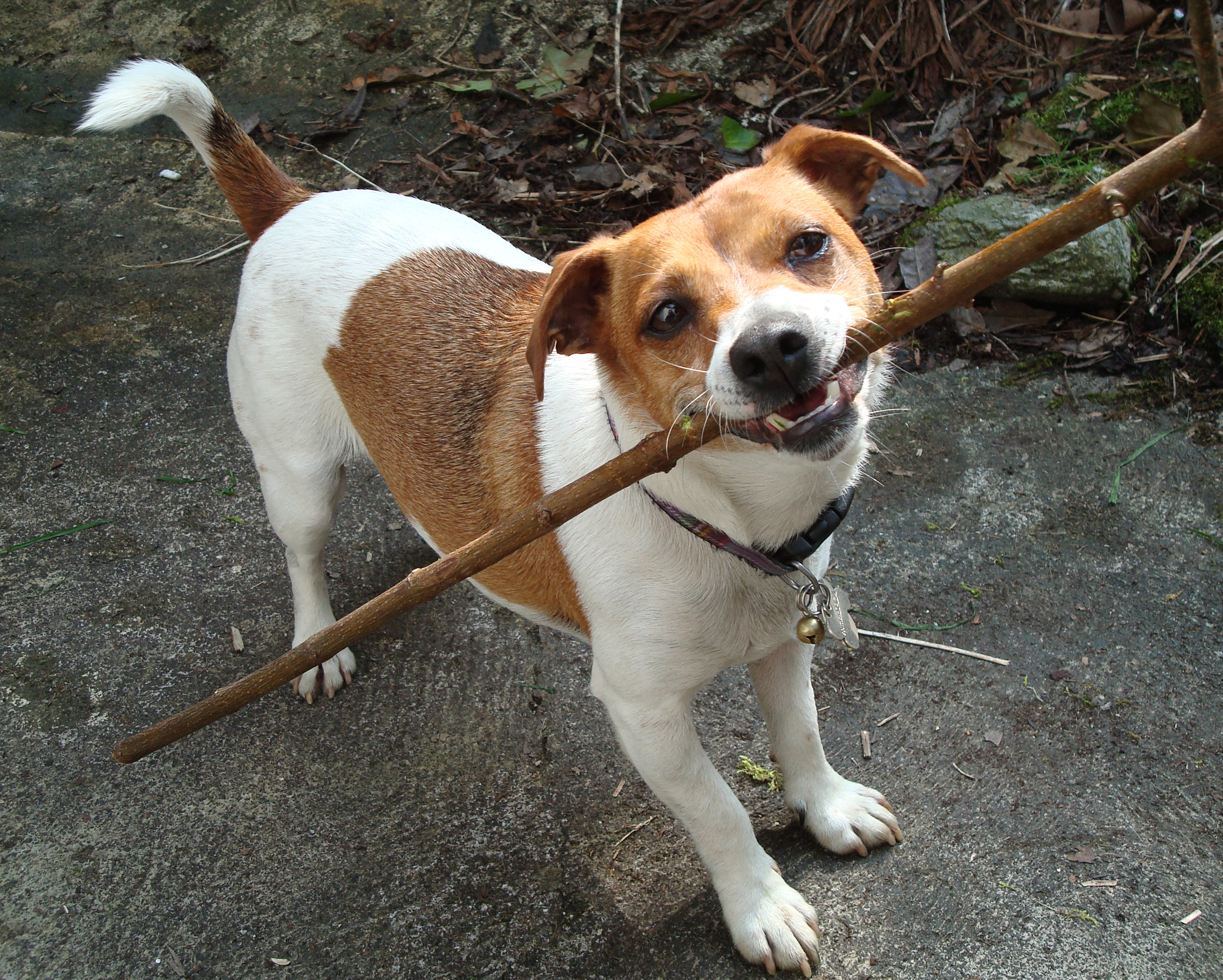
A Jack Russell Terrier brings a stick

== Description ==
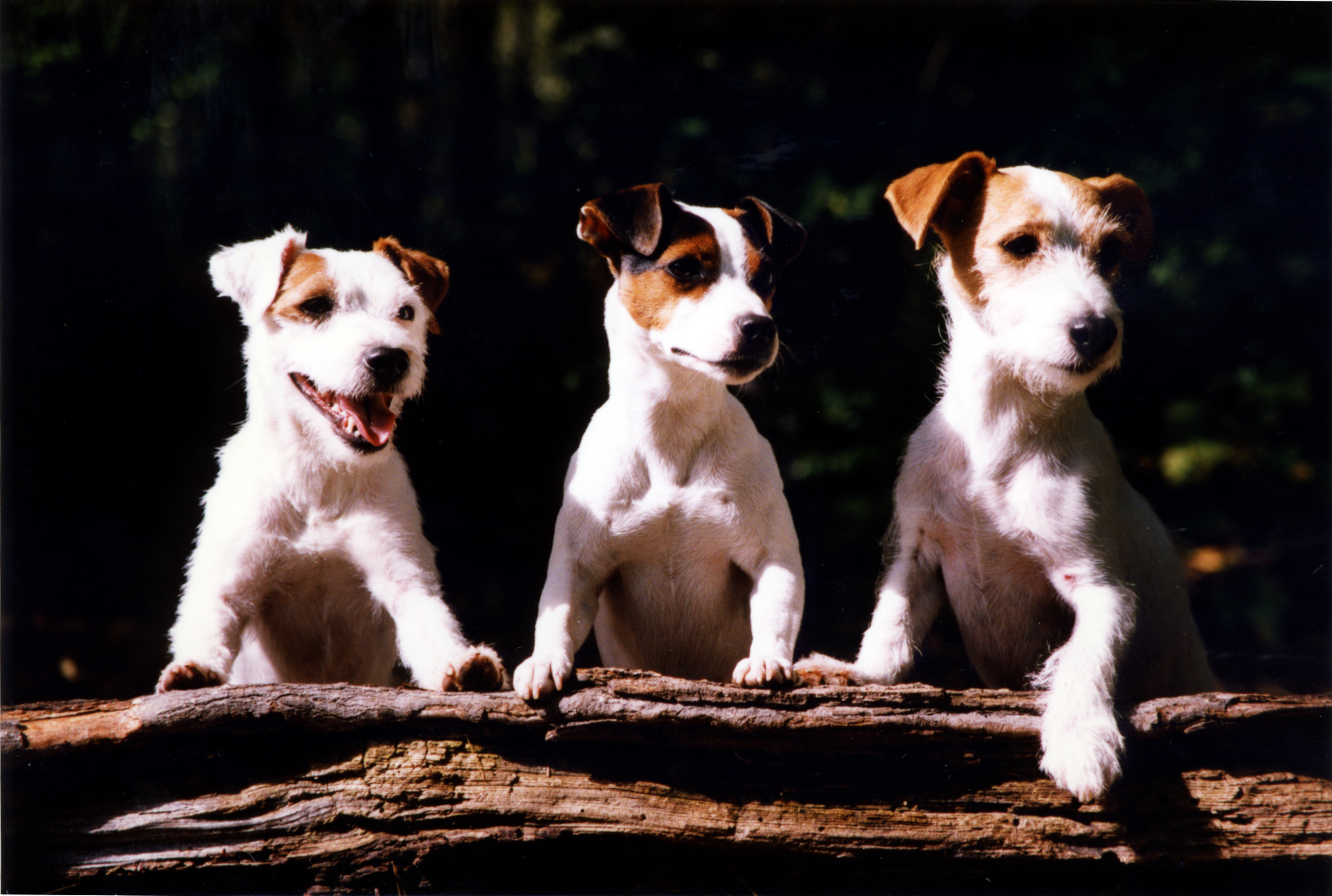
Jack Russell terriers come in a variety of coat types, and with a range of markings

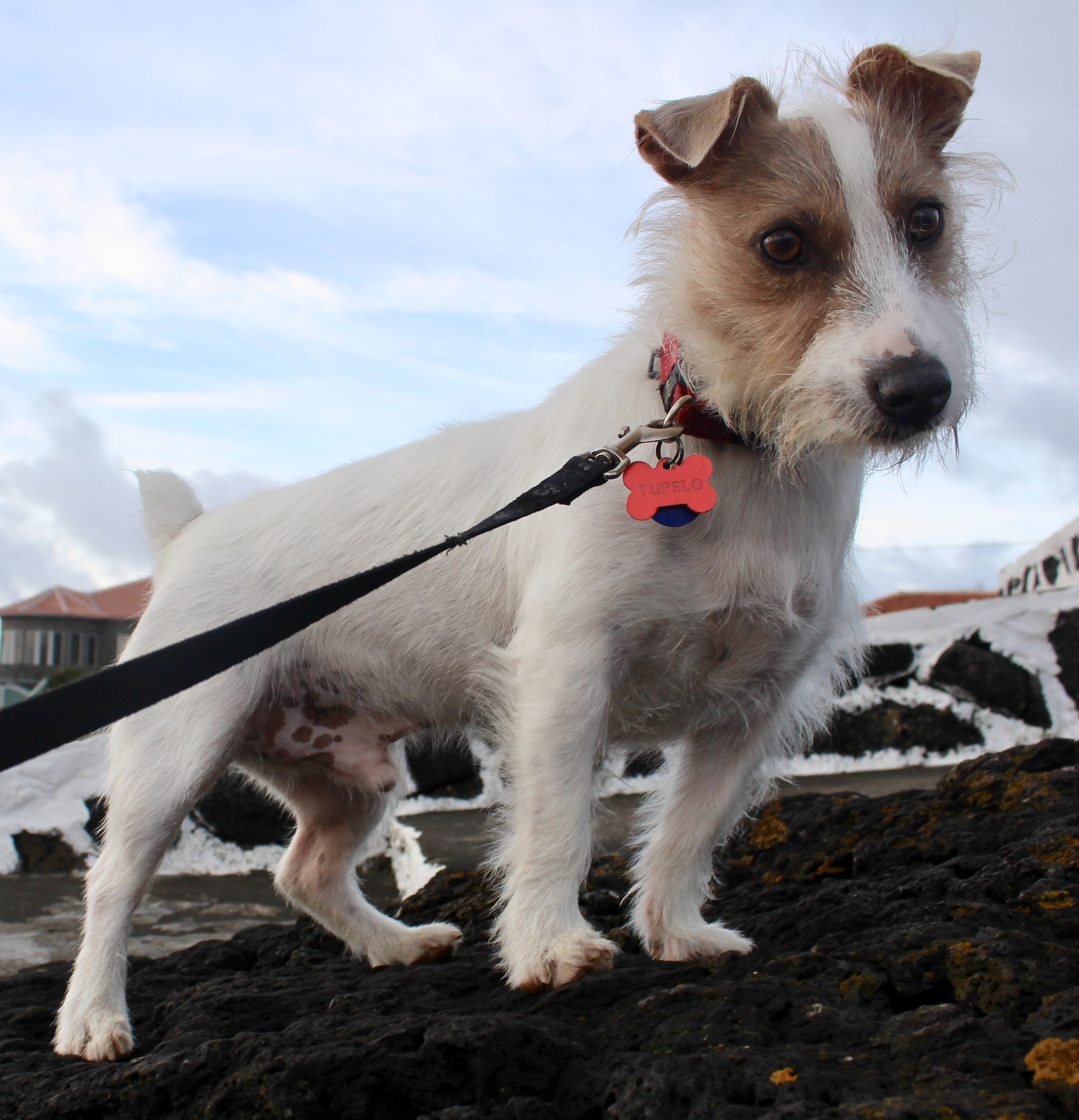
An example of a broken coated Jack Russell terrier

Due to their working nature, Jack Russell terriers remain much as they were some 200 years ago. They are sturdy, rugged, and tenacious, measuring 25–38 cm (10–15 in) at the withers, and weighing 6–8 kg (14–18 lb). The body length must be in proportion to the height, and the dog should present a compact, balanced image. Predominantly white in colouration (more than 51%) with black and/or brown and/or tan markings, they exhibit either a smooth, rough or a combination of both which is known as a broken coat. A broken-coated dog may have longer hair on the tail or face than that which is seen on a smooth-coated dog.

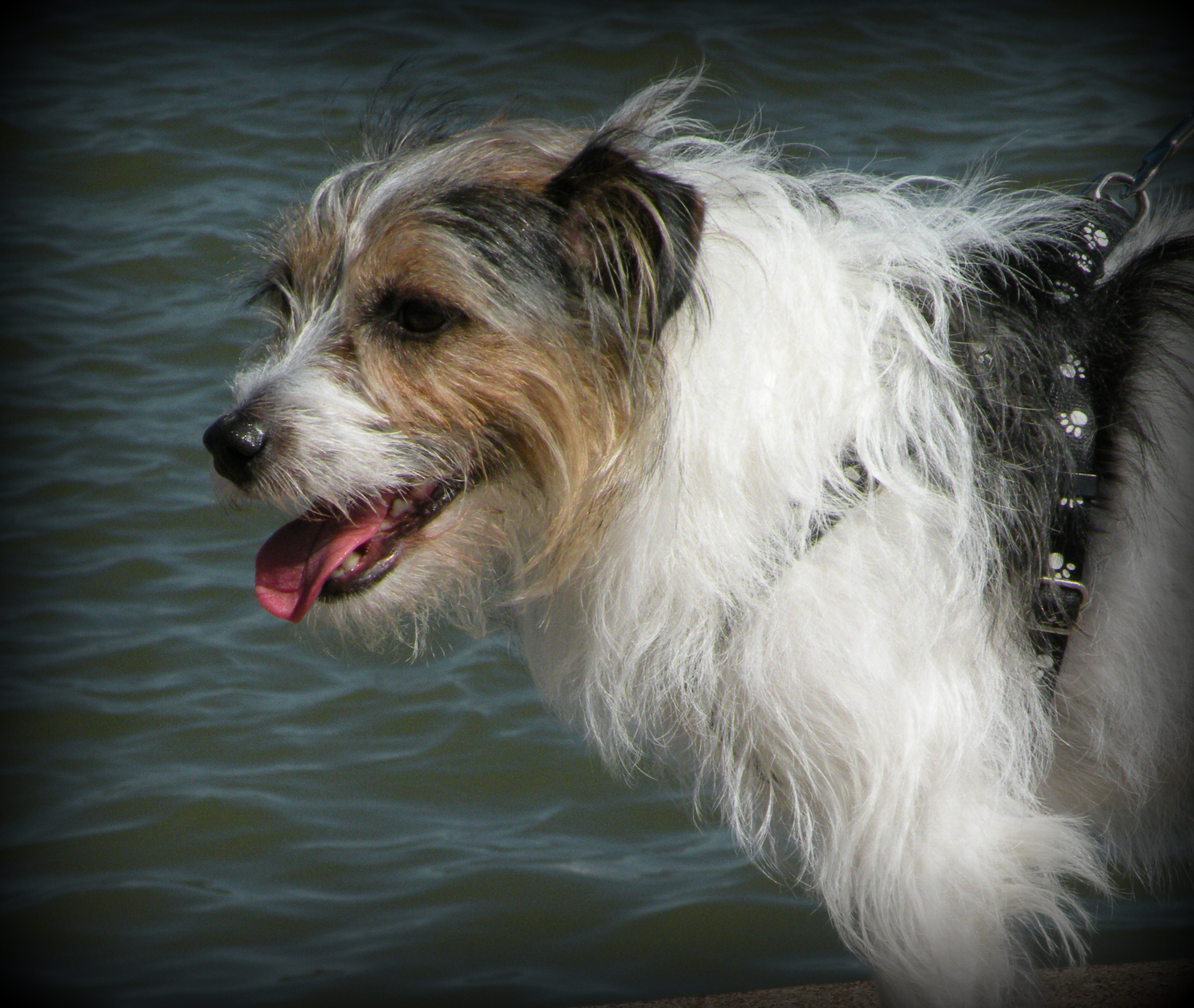
An example of a rough-coated Jack Russell terrier

The head should be of moderate width at the ears, narrowing to the eyes, and slightly flat between the ears. There should be a defined but not overpronounced stop at the end of the muzzle where it meets the head, and a black nose. The jaw should be powerful and well boned with a scissor bite and straight teeth. The eyes are almond shaped and dark coloured and should be full of life and intelligence. Small V-shaped ears of moderate thickness are carried forward on the head. When the dog is alert, the tip of the V should not extend past the outer corner of the eyes. The tail is set high and, in the past, was docked to approximately 10 cm (5 in) to provide a sufficient handhold for gripping the terrier.

The Jack Russell should always appear balanced and alert. The red fox is the traditional quarry of the Jack Russell terrier, so the working Jack Russell must be small enough to pursue it. Red foxes vary in size, but across the world, they average from 6–8 kg (13–17 lb) in weight and have an average chest size of 30–36 cm (12–14 in) at the widest part.

=== Differences from related breeds ===
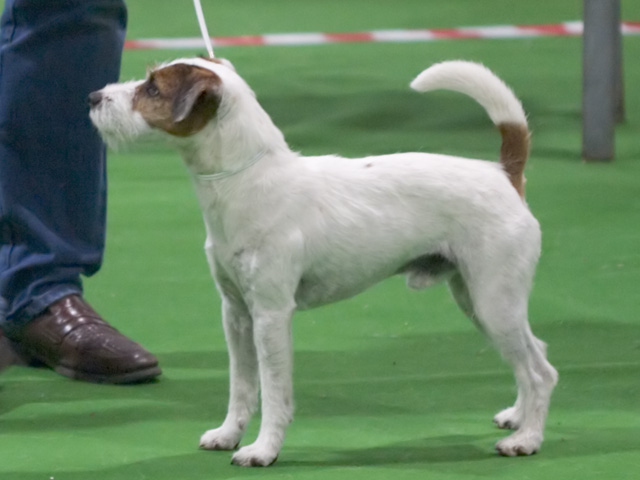
The Parson Russell terrier (pictured) shares a common ancestry with the Jack Russell terrier.

The Jack Russell terrier and Parson Russell Terrier breeds are similar, sharing a common origin, but have several marked differences – the most notable being the range of acceptable heights. Other differences in the Parson Russell can include a longer head and larger chest as well as overall a larger body size. The height of a Parson Russell at the withers according to the breed standard is 30–36 cm (12–14 in) which places it within the range of the Jack Russell Terrier Club of America's standard size for a Jack Russell of 25–38 cm (10–15 in). However, the Parson Russell is a conformation show standard whereas the Jack Russell standard is a more general working standard.

The Russell Terrier, which is also sometimes called the English Jack Russell terrier or the Short Jack Russell terrier is a generally smaller related breed. Both the breed standards of the American Russell Terrier Club and the English Jack Russell Terrier Club Alliance states that at the withers it should be an ideal height of 20–30 cm (8–12 in). Although sometimes called the English or Irish Jack Russell terrier, this is not the recognised height of Jack Russells in the United Kingdom. According to the Jack Russell Club of Great Britain's breed standard, it is the same size as the standard for Jack Russells in the United States, 25–38 cm (10–15 in). Compared to the Parson Russell Terrier, the Russell Terrier should always be longer than tall at the withers, whereas the Parson Russell's points should be of equal distance. The Fédération Cynologique Internationale standard for the Jack Russell terrier has this smaller size listed as a requirement. Terrierman Eddie Chapman, who has hunted in Devon for more than 30 years, the same area that John Russell himself hunted, notes that, "I can state categorically that if given the choice, ninety-nine percent of hunt terrier men would buy an under 12 in (30 cm) worker, if it was available, over a 14 in (36 cm) one."

== Temperament ==
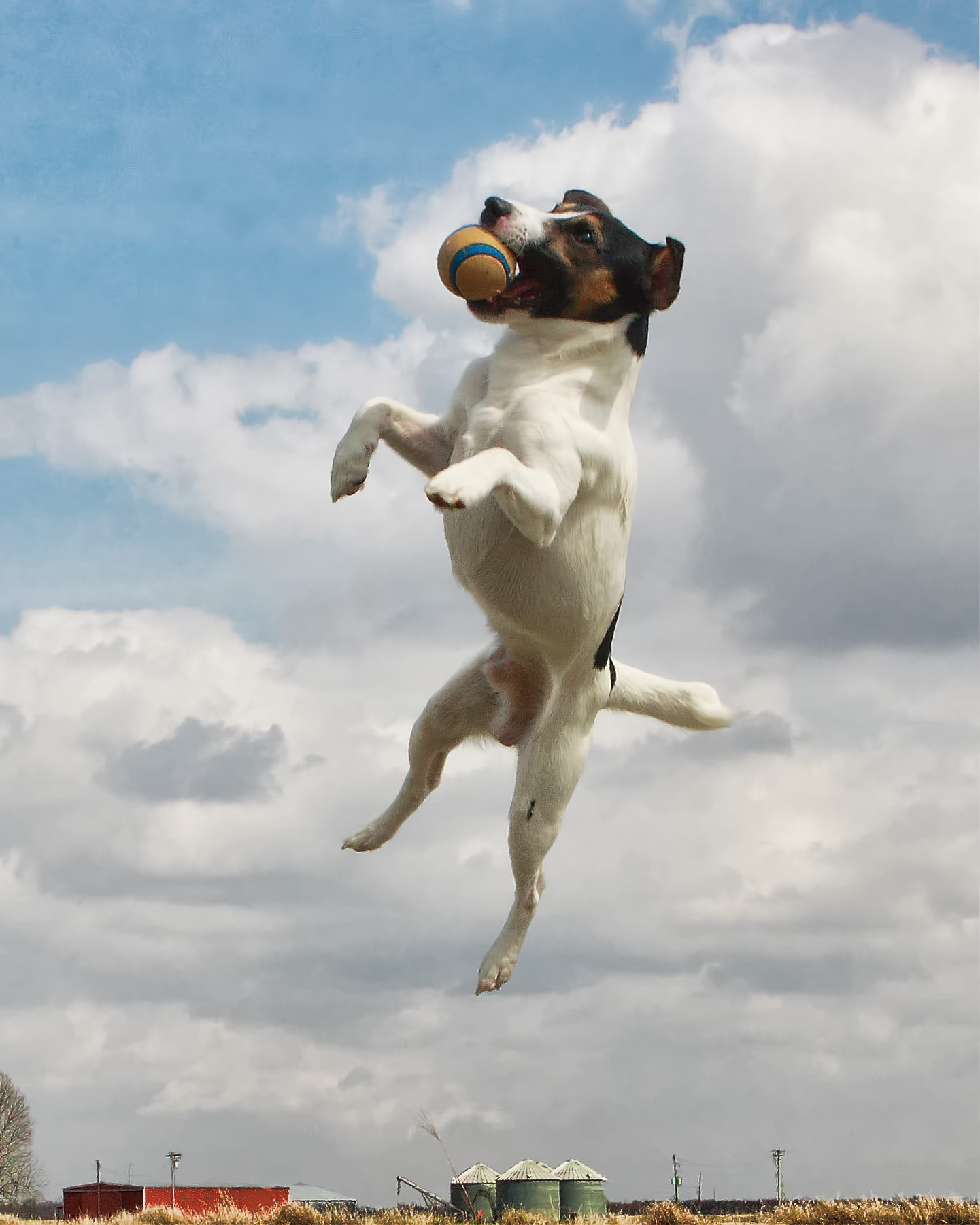
Jack Russell terriers have a high energy level.

Jack Russells are a working terrier. Originally bred to bolt foxes from their dens during hunts, they are used on ground-dwelling quarry such as groundhog, badger, otter, and red and grey fox. To accomplish this, the dog will not bark but will expect attention to the quarry continuously. Because the preservation of this working ability is important to most registered JRTCA/JRTCGB breeders, Jack Russells tend to be extremely intelligent, athletic, fearless, and vocal dogs.

Their high energy and drive make these dogs ideally suited to a number of different dog sports such as flyball or agility. Obedience classes are also recommended to potential owners, as Jack Russells can be stubborn at times and aggressive towards other animals and humans if not properly socialized.

== Health ==
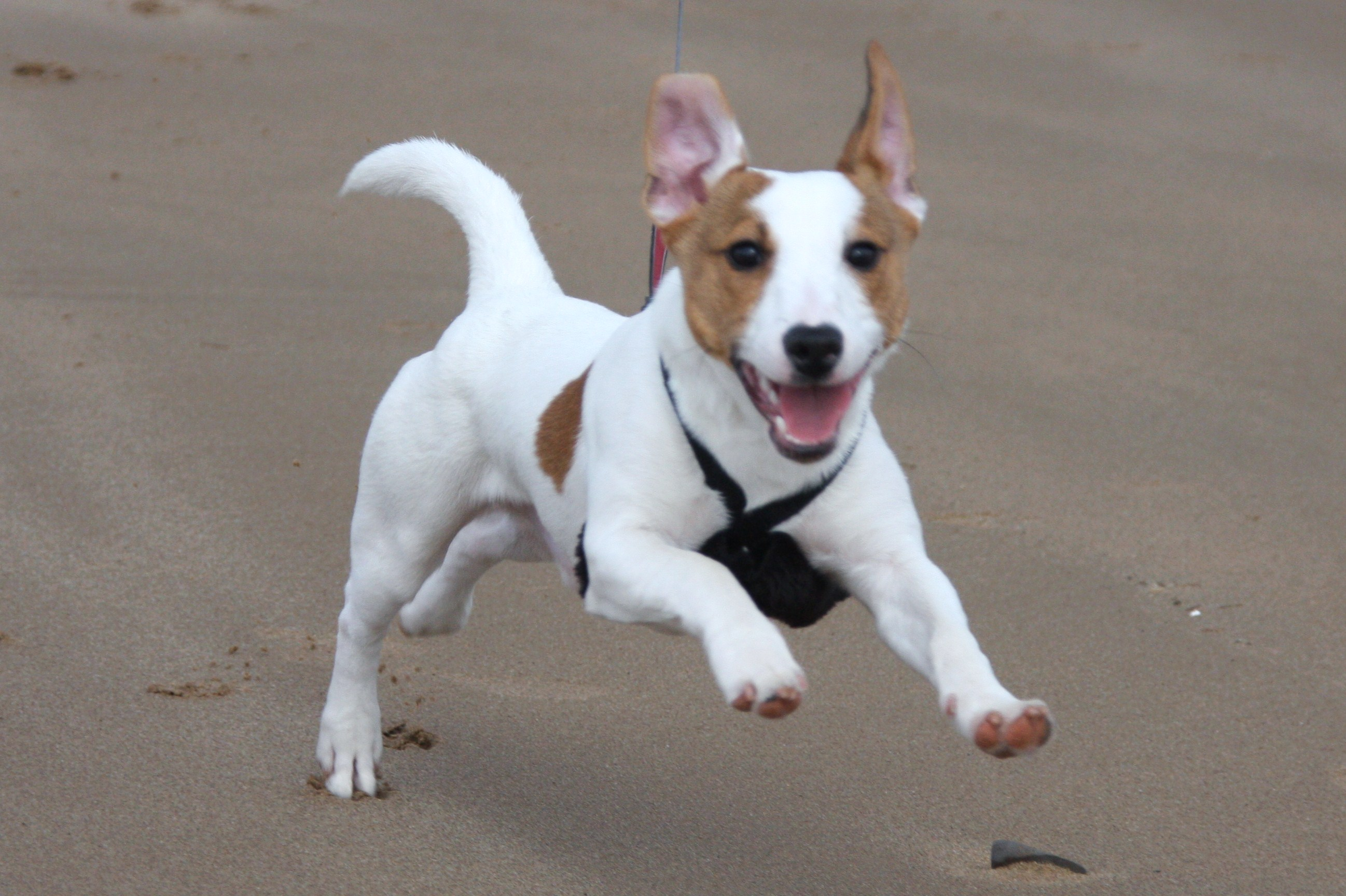
Jack Russell running

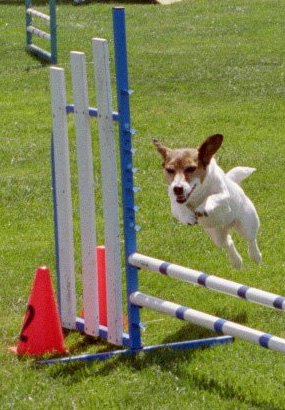
Trump, 2002 USDAA National/World Agility Champion – 12" division

Due to their use in hunting, in the US the Jack Russell is prone to contracting skunk toxic shock syndrome.

A 2022 study of life expectancy of dogs in the UK using veterinary data found the Jack Russell Terrier to have an average life expectancy of 12 years and 9 months, higher than any other breed in the study including crossbreeds. A 2024 UK study found a life expectancy of 13.3 years compared to 12 years for crossbreeds and 12.7 years for purebreds overall. A 2024 Italian study found a life expectancy of 8 years for the breed compared to 10 years overall.

=== Dermatological ===
Black hair follicular dysplasia is a rare type of follicular dysplasia where only the black hairs of a bicolour or tricolour dog will be affected. Jack Russell Terriers are known to be a breed that may acquire the condition although it is seen in several breeds and in mongrels.

A type of ichthyosis that can be distinguished both clinically and histopathologically has been identified in separate Jack Russell Terrier families. This ichthyosis is also more severe than other forms. A mutation in the TGM1 gene has been found to be the cause.

=== Eye disorders ===
Primary lens luxation is an inherited condition that often occurs in Jack Russell Terriers as well as other breeds. A study identified a mutation in the ADAMTS17 gene as being responsible for the condition.

=== Haematology ===
Severe combined immunodeficiency (SCID) is a genetic disorder that is related to a defective antibody response. An autosomal recessive form of SCID has been reported in the Jack Russell Terrier. The condition usually results in death from an infection during the first few months. The allele responsible for the condition is found in less than 1.1% of Jack Russell Terriers and a DNA test exists for the condition.

=== Musculoskeletal ===
Patellar luxation, also known as luxating patella, is a hereditary disorder affecting the knees. It is where the kneecap slips off the groove on which it normally sits. The effects can be temporary with the dog running while holding its hind leg in the air before running on it again once the kneecap slipped back into place as if nothing has happened. Dogs can have a problem with both rear knees, and complications can include arthritis or torn knee ligaments. Severe cases can require surgery. Some are prone to dislocation of the kneecaps, inherited eye diseases, deafness and Legg Perthes—a disease of the hip joints of small dog breeds. Prone to mast cell tumors. Legg–Calvé–Perthes syndrome, also called Avascular Necrosis of the Femoral Head, is where the ball section of the femur in the hip joint deteriorates following interruption of the blood flow and is the same condition as in humans. In dogs, this causes lameness of the hind-legs, the thigh muscles to atrophy and pain in the joint. It usually occurs between 6–12 months of age and has been documented in a variety of other terrier breeds including the Border terrier, Lakeland terrier, and Wheaten terrier.

=== Neurological ===
An inherited form of ataxia has been recognised within the Jack Russell Terrier for more than 50 years. Myokymia and seizures are often seen alongside the condition. A 2014 study identified the KCNJ10 gene as being responsible for the spinocerebellar ataxia accompanied by myokymia and/or seizures in the breed. This condition also affects the closely related Parson Russell Terrier and Russell Terrier.

A UK study found the Jack Russell Terrier to be predisposed to steroid-responsive meningitis-arteritis. The breed was 6.91 times more likely to contract the disease than other breeds.

== National breed clubs ==
Several national breed associations exist to promote and preserve the Jack Russell Terrier, and have a role in maintaining the breed’s working heritage, overseeing breed standards, or having significant historical impact:

- Jack Russell Terrier Club of America (JRTCA) – Founded in 1976, the club serves as the primary breed club in the United States. It maintains the breed registry, organizes trials and events showcasing the Jack Russell’s working abilities, and publishes the bimonthly magazine True Grit. The JRTCA is particularly notable for overseeing the breed independently, having rejected American Kennel Club (AKC) recognition, to preserve the traditional working characteristics of the Jack Russell Terrier. The JRTCA has maintained a policy known as the 'Conflicting Organization Rule' (COR), which prohibits its affiliates and members from registering Jack Russell Terriers with organizations that conflict with the JRTCA registry, such as the American Kennel Club (AKC). This policy was upheld in the 2005 Ninth Circuit Court of Appeals decision in Jack Russell Terrier Network of Northern California v. American Kennel Club, Inc.
- Jack Russell Terrier Club of Great Britain (JRTCGB) – Established in the 1970s, the club promotes the breed in the UK, focusing on its traditional working traits and breed standards. The club organizes working tests, conformation shows, and supports breeders and enthusiasts. It is included here because it is one of the earliest established national clubs and has influenced international standards.

== Well-known Jack Russell terriers ==
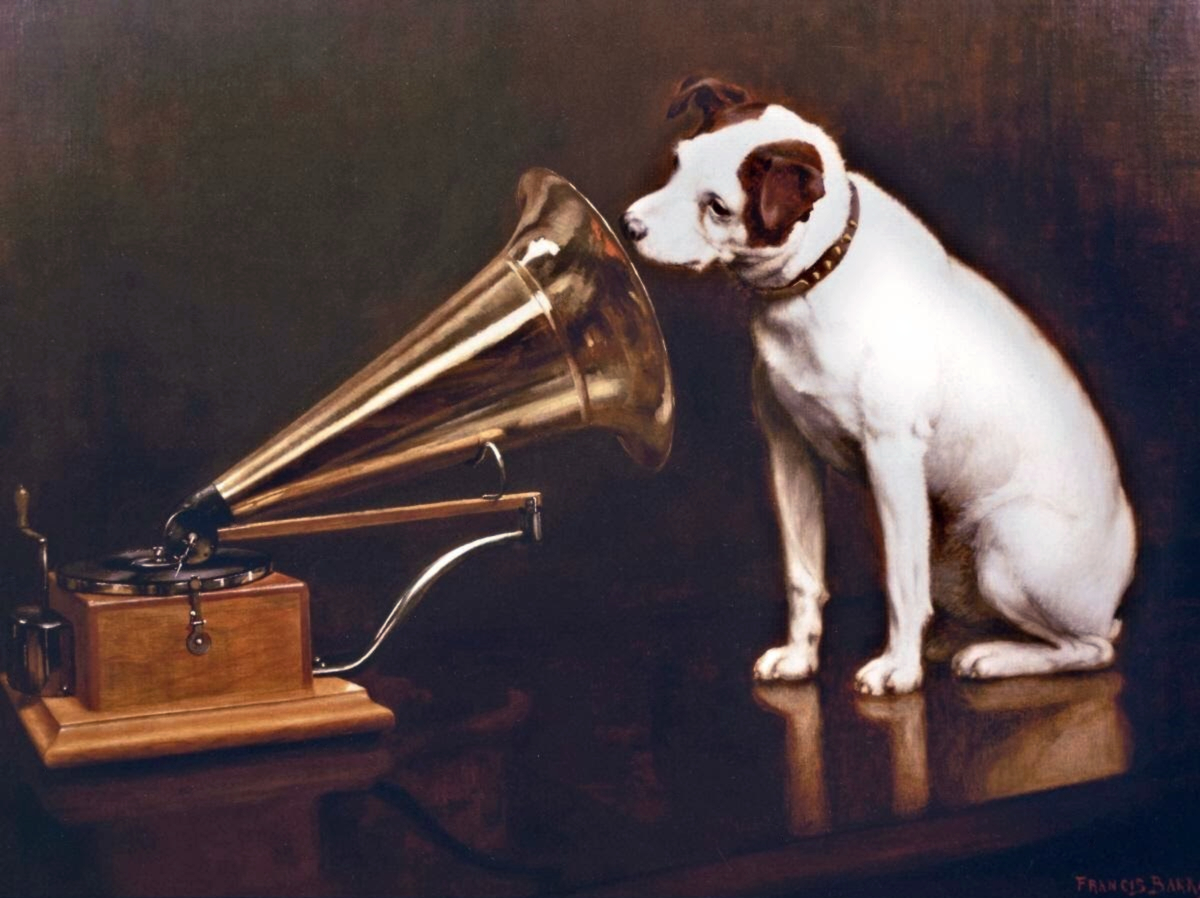
His Master's Voice (1898) by Francis Barraud

Nipper was a dog born in 1884 who was thought to be a dog of the Jack Russell terrier type. He was the inspiration for the painting Dog looking at and listening to a Phonograph, later renamed His Master's Voice. The painting was used by a variety of music related companies including The Gramophone Company, EMI, the Victor Talking Machine Company, and RCA. Today it remains in use incorporated into the logo for the entertainment retailer HMV.

A Jack Russell named Bothie made history in 1982 as part of the Transglobe Expedition. Owned by explorers Ranulph and Ginny Fiennes, he became the first dog to travel to both the North and South Poles. This feat is unlikely to be repeated, as all dogs have been banned from Antarctica by the Antarctic Treaty nations since 1994, due to fears that they could transmit diseases to the native seal population. Ranulph Fiennes and Charles Burton actually made the trip to the north pole by powered sledges before signalling to the base camp that they had arrived. To celebrate their achievement, a plane was sent out to take the two men champagne, along with Bothie.

On 29 April 2007, a Jack Russell named George saved five children at a carnival in New Zealand from an attack by two pit bulls. He was reported to have charged at them and held them at bay long enough for the children to get away, but he was killed by the pit bulls. He was posthumously awarded the PDSA Gold Medal in 2009, the animal equivalent of the George Cross. A statue has been erected in Manaia, New Zealand, in his memory. A former US Marine also donated to George's owner a Purple Heart award he had received for service in Vietnam.

In 2019, Boris Johnson and his partner Carrie Symonds took a Jack Russell cross from an animal rescue charity in Wales. The dog's name is Dilyn and he became a famous dog at a polling station in the general election.

During the ongoing 2022 Russian invasion of Ukraine, a 2-year old Jack Russell named Patron has been working with the State Emergency Service of Ukraine to sniff out Russian explosives. As of April 20, 2022, the Ukrainian Government announced that he had located nearly 90 explosives.

=== On screen and in literature ===
In the UK, one of the more recognisable canine stars was restaurateur and chef Rick Stein's terrier Chalky, who frequently upstaged his owner on his various cookery series. Chalky had his own line of merchandise, including plushes, tea towels, art prints, art paw prints and two real ales – Chalky's Bite and Chalky's Bark, which won gold in the Quality Drink Awards 2009. Chalky was given a BBC obituary when he died in 2007.

Moose and his son Enzo played the role of Eddie on the long-running American TV sitcom Frasier. Eddie belonged to lead character Frasier's father Martin Crane, and constantly "stole the show" with his deadpan antics, receiving more fan mail than any other Frasier character. Moose and Enzo also starred as Skip in the 2000 film My Dog Skip.

Soccer was a Jack Russell who became the star of the American TV series Wishbone, which aired from 1995 to 2001.

In the 2009 movie Hotel for Dogs, Friday, one of the main characters, is a Jack Russell, played by the dog actor Cosmo. Cosmo went on to appear in the films Paul Blart: Mall Cop and Beginners.

Uggie (2002–2015) was an animal actor, appearing in commercials starting in 2005 and in the films Water for Elephants and The Artist, both in 2011. In the same year, based on interest following The Artist, the "Consider Uggie" campaign was launched, which attempted to gain the dog a nomination for an Academy Award. In 2012, Uggie was named Nintendo's first-ever spokesdog.

Sykes (est. 2001–2019) was a dog actor from Clifton, Oxfordshire, England. He was best known in the UK for his appearance as "Harvey" in Thinkbox's three television commercials, and, under his real name in five seasons of Midsomer Murders. He also appeared in several Hollywood blockbusters, as well as in a UK TV movie, several series and miniseries. He retired in 2016 after a long career on the big and small screen. Sykes was also a champion agility competitor.

A clever Jack Russell Terrier, named Jack, played a central role in the 1980s TV adventure series Tales of the Gold Monkey.

Max, the main protagonist in Illumination's The Secret Life of Pets franchise is a Jack Russell Terrier living with his adopted brother Duke, a large Newfoundland mix, and owners Katie, Chuck, and Liam.

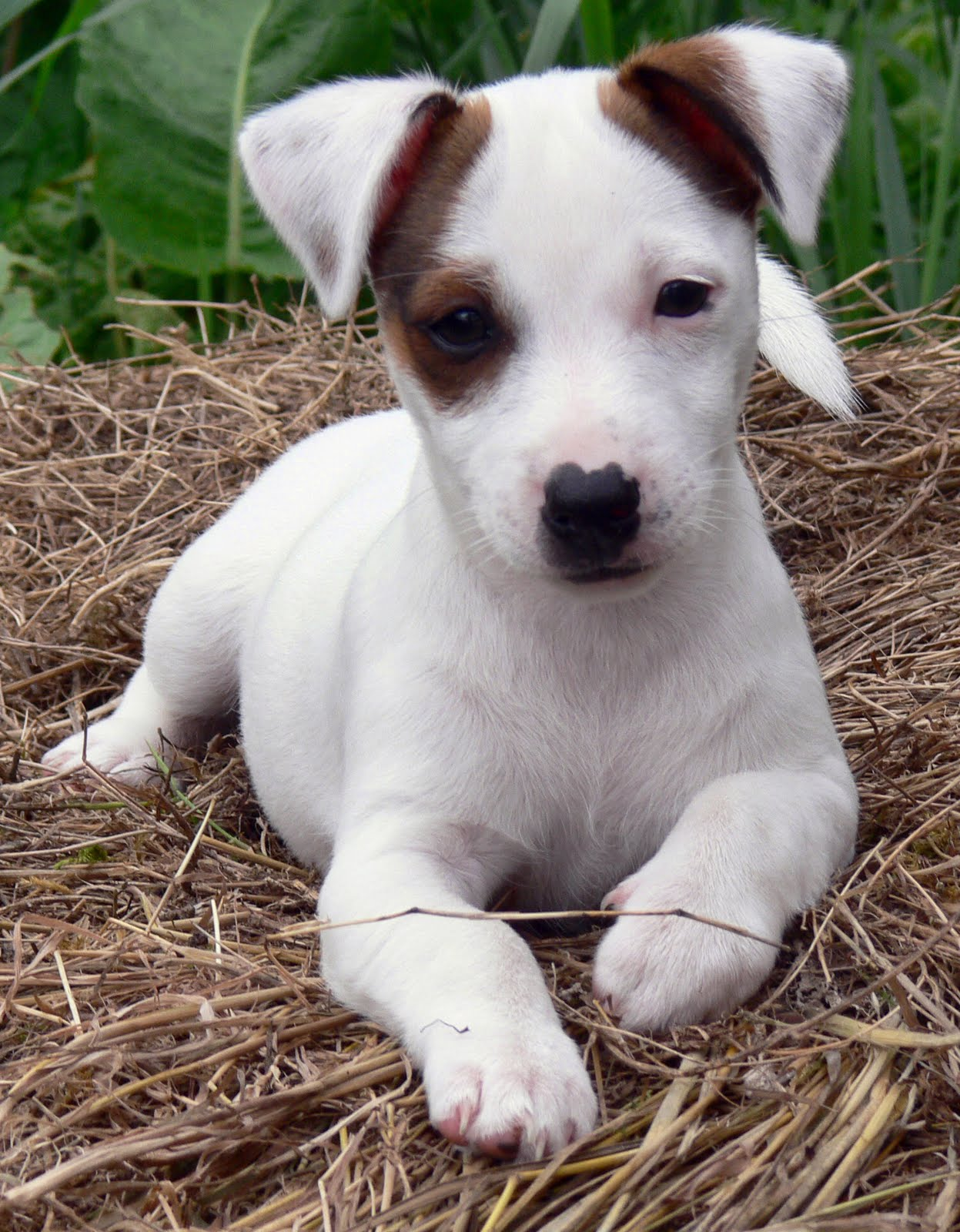
A smooth-coated Jack Russell terrier puppy

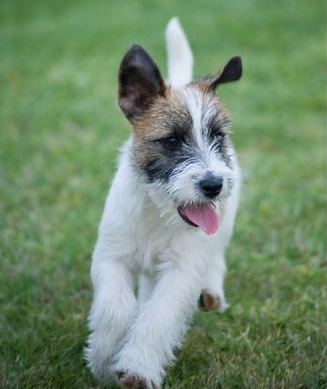
A rough-coated Jack Russell terrier puppy
