= Sykes (dog) =

British dog actor

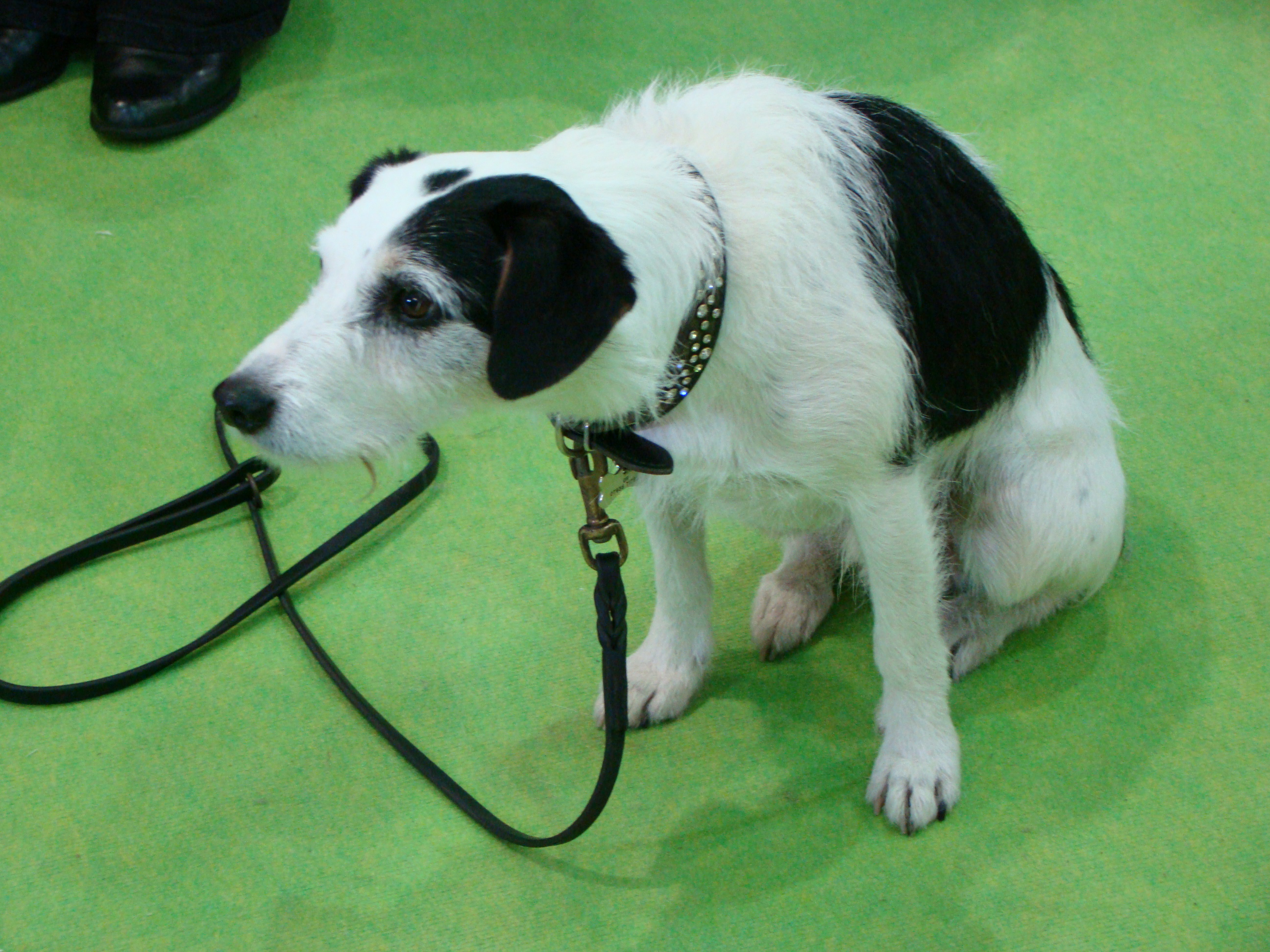
- Sykes, appearing at Discover Dogs in 2010
- Other names: "Harvey"; Sykes of the Manor; "Sykesie"
- Species: Canis familiaris
- Breed: Parson Russell Terrier
- Sex: Male
- Born: Sykes c. 2001 believed to be in Clifton, Oxfordshire, England
- Died: 15 or 16 June 2019 (est. age of 18 years)
- Nationality: United Kingdom
- Occupation: Dog actor
- Years active: 2003 –16
- Owner: Gill Raddings
- Appearance: Black and white fur

Sykes (c. 2001 – June 2019) was a dog actor from Clifton, Oxfordshire, England. He was best known in the UK for his appearance as Harvey in Thinkbox's television commercial and, under his real name, in Midsomer Murders (series fourteen to eighteen, inclusive). He also appeared in several Hollywood blockbusters, as well as a UK TV movie, several series, and a miniseries. Originally found as a stray, he was owned by animal trainer and stunt dog specialist Gill Raddings. Since January 2016 Sykes had been in semi-retirement with him no longer being displayed as available for hire on Gill Raddings' agency website. In September 2016, Midsomer Murders announced that Sykes had retired. He died in June 2019.

== History ==
Sykes was found roaming as a stray. He was rehomed with Gill Raddings, a stunt dog specialist in Clifton, Oxfordshire.

== Career ==
They say you should never work with animals or children but, as far as I'm concerned, it's rubbish because Sykes – as I’ve come to know him – was the consummate professional. It was a joy to work with him.

— Peter Kay

Sykes went on to become a star of the big and small screen, and considered "one of the most beloved TV dogs since Lassie." With an article titled, "He irons, he cooks, he acts - Sykes, the thespian terrier," he graced the cover of the Country Life magazine, dated 25 January 2012. Another article about Sykes and his film career was in The Sunday Times, in February 2012, titled, "Bites, camera, action".

=== Motion pictures ===
He appeared in many motion pictures, several of which were Hollywood blockbusters. Films that Sykes appeared in include Pirates of the Caribbean: The Curse of the Black Pearl (2003), Alexander (2004), Sweeney Todd: The Demon Barber of Fleet Street (2007), The Other Boleyn Girl (2008), Young Victoria (2009), The Duchess (2008), Prince of Persia: The Sands of Time (2010), The Wolfman (2010), Burke and Hare (2010), Clash of the Titans (2010, and Snow White and the Huntsman (2012).

=== Advertisements ===
He starred in Thinkbox's award-winning advert "Every Home Needs a Harvey", and became better known to the public as his character in the advert, "Harvey". By the end of 2010, the advert had been viewed on YouTube more than a million times, and had over 11,600 followers on Facebook. The advert was named "Advert of the Year" by a poll of ITV viewers for 2010. Sykes was Dog Trust's Canine Celebrity of the Year.

In September 2010, the John Smith's Brewery advert "Dog Show" began to broadcast, starring Peter Kay and co-starring Sykes as the Jack Russell Terrier. Campaignlive named the ad as one of the Top Ten Best Dog Ads.

Sykes starred in two more Thinkbox adverts. In 2012, he was with his best friend Rabbit. ' Harvey & Rabbit' appeared in Nielsen's study of the Most Liked Ads of 2012 and Campaign's Top 10 TV & Cinema Ads of 2012. In 2014, Harvey was with his leading lady, Harmony. ‘Harvey & Harmony’ was one of the nation's top ten most liked ads of 2015, according to a study by Ebiquity and TNS.

In 2016, K-9 magazine considered Sykes as one of the top 5 dogs in television advertising.

=== Television ===
Sykes' TV repertoire was as extensive as his movie appearances. In 2004, he starred in the children's TV series, In2Minds, as Zoe's pet dog, Sirius. In 2005, Sykes was the dog in the baking commercial in the 4th episode of Series 1 of Doctor Who. He appeared in the British medical series, Casualty, and Dalziel & Pascoe (possibly Series 9), Heartbeat, and Holby City. In 2006, Sykes starred in the TV movie, Pickles: The Dog Who Won the World Cup. In 2007, Sykes appeared on Miss Marple, Series 3, Episode 3, as Donald, a disobedient dog running on the beach and smelling like fish. He even sat on Miss Marple's (Geraldine McEwan) lap. In Return to Cranford (December 2009), he played the part of William Buxton's (Tom Hiddleston) dog named Napoleon. In episode 1, he was very disobedient, but in episode 2, he was well-behaved. He also appeared in Doc Martin (2009), Series 4, Episode 1, as the lead dog of strays interested in the cow hearts the Doc (Martin Clunes) was carrying in a grocery bag. In New Tricks (2011), Series 8, Episode 2, Sykes was a homeless dog owned by a homeless young lady named Leah.

Sykes was then cast in Midsomer Murders after attracting the attention of series producer, Brian True-May, and appeared in every episode of the show's series 14 through 18 (inclusive). He was DCI John Barnaby's (Neil Dudgeon) family dog. On several occasions, DCI Barnaby called his pet dog "Sykesie" instead of Sykes. Sykes appeared on the List of Midsomer Murders' supporting characters.

== Agility competitions and other activities ==
During his pre-retirement years, Sykes attended fan conventions, and bank openings. He competed at Crufts at the championship level, in agility, under the name of "Sykes of the Manor" with his handler, Alison Pearce. In 2013, Sykes competed in the Discover Dogs Small Mixi Pairs alongside Fuzzy No Angel. In 2014, he was part of the Medium Novice ABC Team, Souldern Medley.

== Retirement ==
During the filming of Midsomer Murders' series 18 (2015), Sykes' trainer, Gill Raddings, called the executive producer and said it was time to retire Sykes at the end of the year. She had noticed that he had started to go deaf. Sykes appeared for the last time in episode 6 of Series 18, "Harvest of Souls." In episode 1 of Series 19 (2016), "The Village That Rose from the Dead," the character Sykes had died, and a grave bearing a cross with his name was in the Barnaby backyard. Betty's pink bear was on top of Sykes's grave. In episode 3 of Series 19 (2016), "Last Man Out," DI Ben Jones expressed his condolences to the Barnaby family for the loss of Sykes.

In January 2016, Sykes was in semi-retirement as the Gill Raddings Stunt Dogs website indicated that Sykes was no longer available for hire, but could be made available for producers he had previously worked for. On 22 September 2016, Midsomer Murders officially announced that Sykes, a veteran of the big and small screen, had retired.

The official Harvey Facebook page showed that in September 2016, Harvey, Harmony, Rabbit, and the pups were relaxing. In December 2016, Sykes was running through the grounds of the Bicester Hotel Golf and Spa with a miniature replica of an Oscar in his mouth. Gill Raddings, his trainer, said that Sykes has never been happier. "He is loving life....He's been going for nice long walks every day and is sleeping a bit more on the sofa nowadays. Sykes has had a long working life, plus he's going a bit deaf now, so it was time for him to retire... He still gets recognized a lot, and people come up to him for selfies... He is a very happy chap and has earned every minute of his retirement." Sykes spent his retirement years with his foster family, initially one of two dogs, but over time became of one of six.

== Awards/recognition ==
Country	Organization	Year	Category/Event	Work/Competition	Result	Notes
UK	Dogs' Trust	2010	Canine Celebrity of the Year	Thinkbox Advert, "Harvey"	Won	
UK	The Kennel Club	2013	Crufts	Agility Medium Novice ABC	Qualified	
UK	The Kennel Club	2013	Discover Dogs	Agility Small Mixi Pairs	Qualified	
UK	The Kennel Club	2014	Crufts	Agility Team - Medium	Qualified	

== Death ==
On 19 June 2019, the official Midsomer Murders Facebook page reported that Sykes had died. Midsomer Murders co-producer Ian Strachan began the Facebook tribute by saying, "The best dog on the telly. Sad news that Midsomer's retired sidekick Sykes, loyal companion to John Barnaby and family passed away over the weekend." His foster mom, Alison Pearce made a Facebook comment to the Midsomer Murders' tribute: "Forever in our hearts, cheeky boy. A pleasure to foster you for 16 years." She also clarified that he was actually 18 years of age when he died.

== Remembrance ==
Sykes was remembered as one of the "great pets that we have had the pleasure to cross paths with over the years on various British dramas and mysteries" in the article of 20 February 2021, "Remembering Midsomer Murders' Sykes and other 4-legged Screen Pets on National Love Your Pet Day 2021!"

On 26 August 2021, International Dog Day, Sykes was the main topic of the article, "Remembering Midsomer Murders' Sykes and other 4-legged screen pets on International Dog Day 2021!"

== Filmography ==
=== Films ===
Year of First Release	Title	Role	Notes
2003	Pirates of the Caribbean: The Curse of the Black Pearl		
2004	Alexander		
2007	Sweeney Todd: The Demon Barber of Fleet Street	Dog on a leash being walked several times	
2008	The Other Boleyn Girl	A member King Henry VIII's canine court	
2008	The Duchess		
2009	The Young Victoria		
2010	The Wolfman		
2010	Clash of the Titans		
2010	Prince of Persia: The Sands of Time		
2010	Burke and Hare		
2012	Snow White and the Huntsman		

=== Advertisements ===
Year	Title	Role	Notes
2010	"Every Home Needs a Harvey" by Thinkbox	Harvey	
2010	John Smith Brewery with Peter Kay	Tonto	
2012	"Harvey and Rabbitt" by Thinkbox	Harvey	
2014	"Harvey and Harmony" by Thinkbox	Harvey	Last advert

=== Television ===
Year	Title	Role	Notes
2004	In2Minds	Sirius	Zoe's pet dog, Children's TV series
2005	Doctor Who	Dog in the baking commercial	Series 1, Episode 4
2005	Dalziel & Pascoe	Dog on a boat with fisherman	
?	Casualty		
?	Holby City		
?	Heartbeat		
2006	Pickles: The Dog Who Won the World Cup	Pickles	TV movie
2007	Miss Marple	Donald	Series 3, Episode 3
2009	Doc Martin	Lead dog of strays	Series 4, Episode 1
2009	Return to Cranford	Napoleon	Miniseries, Episodes 1 and 2
2011	New Tricks	Homeless dog	Series 8, Episode 2, "End of the Line"; owned by Leah, a homeless young lady
2011-2016	Midsomer Murders	Sykes (Sykesie)	Series 14 through 18
2016	Agatha Raisin	Homeless dog	Episode 8, "Murderous Marriage." In the beginning scenes, leashed dog walking beside a homeless couple pushing a shopping cart.

== See also ==
- List of individual dogs
