= Parson Russell Terrier =

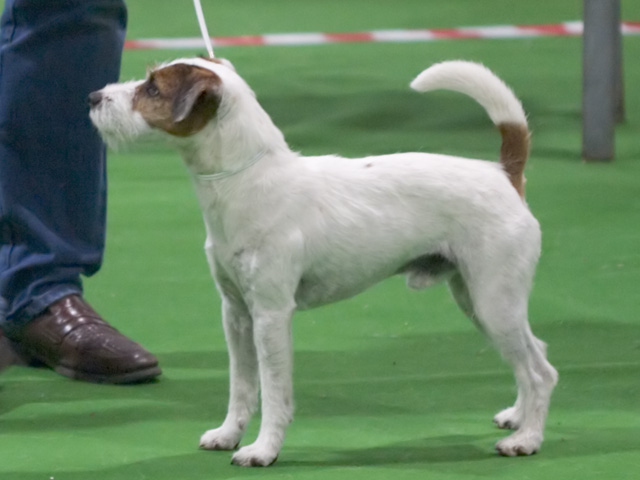
- Other names: Parson; Parson Jack Russell Terrier
- Origin: England
Kennel club standards
- The Kennel Club: standard
- Fédération Cynologique Internationale: standard

The Parson Russell Terrier is an English breed of small white terrier that was the original Fox Terrier of the 18th century. The breed is named after the Reverend Jack Russell, credited with the creation of this type of dog. It is the recognised conformation show variety of the Jack Russell Terrier and was first recognised in 1990 in the United Kingdom as the Parson Jack Russell Terrier. In America, it was first recognised as the Jack Russell Terrier in 1997. The name was changed to its current form in 1999 in the UK and by 2008 all international kennel clubs recognised it under the new name.

A mostly white breed with either a smooth, rough or broken coat, it conforms to a narrower range of sizes than the Jack Russell. It is a feisty, energetic terrier, suited to sports and able to get along with children and other animals. It has a range of breed-related health issues, mainly relating to eye disorders.

== History ==
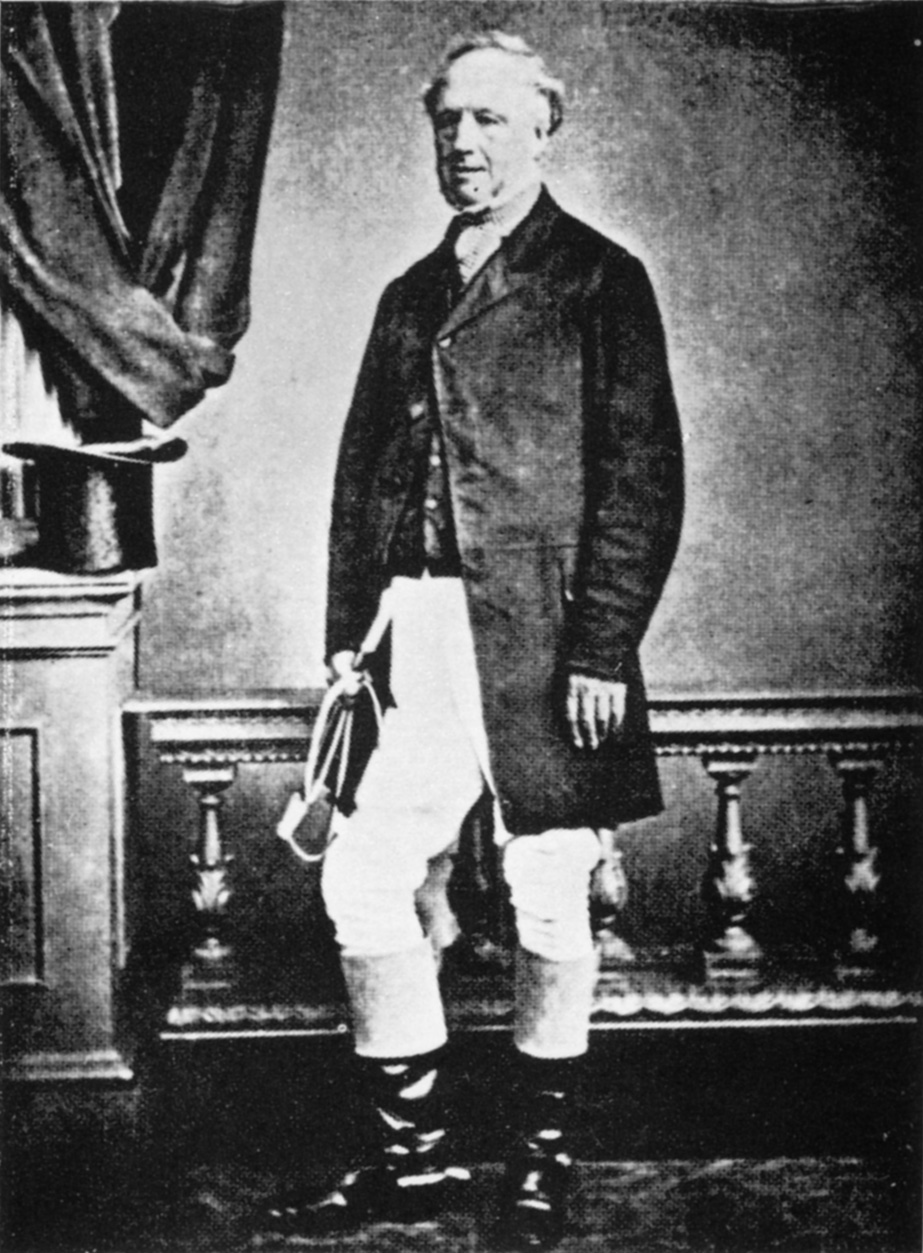
John "Jack" Russell, dog breed developer and namesake of this and other white terriers.

This breed shares a common history with the Jack Russell Terrier until the early 1980s.

This type of small white terrier dates back to the work of the Reverend John Russell, born in 1795. In 1819 he purchased a small white and tan terrier bitch named Trump from a milkman in the hamlet of Elmsford. She formed the basis for his breeding programme, and by the 1850s the dogs were recognised as a distinct type of Fox Terrier.

In 1894, the Devon and Somerset Badger Club was founded by Arthur Blake Heinemann who created the first breed standard for this type of terrier. The club was formed with the aim of promoting badger digging, rather than fox hunting. By the turn of the 20th century, the name of John Russell had become associated with this type of terrier. The Devon and Somerset Badger Club would go on to be renamed the Parson Jack Russell Terrier Club and continued until just before World War II when the club folded.

In 1983, the Parson Jack Russell Terrier Club (PJRTC) was reformed with the aim of seeking Kennel Club recognition for the breed. The initial application was turned down, but after several further rejections, the Parson Jack Russell Terrier was recognised on 9 January 1990 as a variant of the Fox Terrier, with the United Kennel Club following suit in 1991. The American Kennel Club recognised the breed as the Jack Russell Terrier effective 1 November 1997.

On 1 August 1999, the PJRTC successfully petitioned the Kennel Club (UK) to change the name of the breed to the Parson Russell Terrier, with the name of the breed club following suit. The international kennel association, the Fédération Cynologique Internationale, recognised the Parson Russell Terrier on 4 June 2001. The American Kennel Club updated the name of the recognised breed from Jack Russell Terrier on 1 April 2003. The United Kennel Club adopted the new name on 23 April 2008.

The Australian National Kennel Council (ANKC), New Zealand Kennel Club and United Kennel Club (UKC) are the only three major kennel clubs to recognise both the Jack Russell Terrier and the Parson Russell Terrier separately. In 2009, there were 18 Parsons registered with the ANKC compared to 1073 Jack Russells.

== Description ==
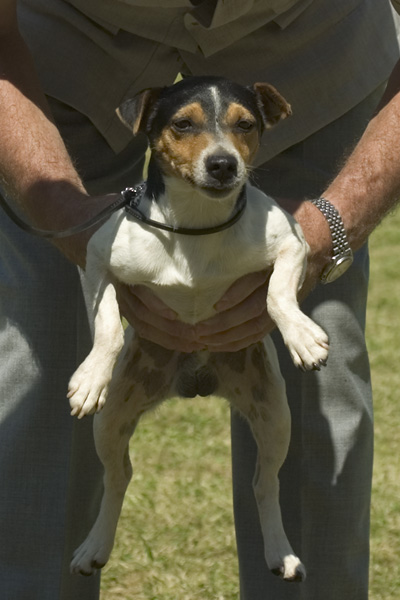
A judge spanning a Parson Russell Terrier.

The Parson Russell Terrier is bred to conform to a conformation show standard. Unlike its close relative, the Jack Russell Terrier, Parson Russell Terriers have noticeably longer legs that are about as tall as the length of the Terrier's body. It is a predominantly white breed with black, tan, mustard or tricolour markings and an easy to groom coat which can be rough, smooth or broken (similar to a smooth coat, but with some longer hair on the head, face, legs or body). The breed standard does not recognise a Parson Russell with a curly or rough coat. There is a clear outline with only a hint of eyebrows and beard should the dog be broken coated. They possess moderately thick small V-shaped drop ears with the tip pointed towards the eyes. The nose of the dog should be black. The normal range of sizes is between 13–14 inches (33–36 cm) tall at the withers, with a weight around 13–17 pounds (5.9–7.7 kg).

The Parson Russell has a relatively square outline, with a body about as long as the dog is tall. Compared to the Jack Russell Terrier, the Parson Russell has a longer head and a larger chest along with overall a slightly larger body size. The Parson retains the flat skull but not the elongated shape of the Fox Terrier, and with lower set ears. In addition, the Jack Russell Terrier has a greater variation in size, ranging between 10–15 inches (25–38 cm) in height at the withers.

Two hands should be able to span the chest of the dog behind its elbows, with the thumbs at the withers. This is required in show judging, with the judge lifting the dog's front legs gently off the ground in this motion in order to measure the size of the chest. The judges fingers should meet under the chest and the thumbs on top of the spine. The American Kennel Club describes this as a "significant factor and a critical part of the judging process." It is not done to measure the size of the chest, but rather to feel for the correct shape.

Under the show standard, there are several physical points which would be treated as faults in the show ring. These are for the height of the dog at the withers to be outside of the standard range, or for the dog to possess either pricked up ears, a liver or brown coloured nose, an overshot or undershot jawline or to have brindle markings.

== Temperament ==
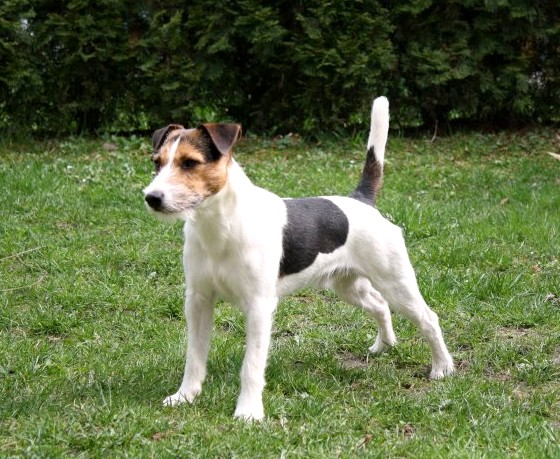
A broken coated Parson Russell Terrier

The Parson is a feisty and energetic type of Terrier. They can excel in dog sports such as flyball or agility and require vigorous exercise in order to prevent them from becoming bored and potentially destructive in the home. They can be suited to live with children but as they have a typical Terrier temperament, they will not tolerate rough handling. The AKC describes them as being single minded, tenacious and courageous when at work, while at home they can be exuberant, playful and affectionate. However, it is unusual for dogs of this breed to be involved in work, such as fox hunting, typical of a small white terrier, as they are more adapted to the show bench.

They can be playful with other dogs, and get along with horses. The breed standard requires that shyness be treated as a fault, although it states that this should not be confused with submissiveness which is not treated as such. Overt aggression towards another dog is not accepted and is a criterion for disqualification in the show ring.

== Health ==
A 2024 UK study found a life expectancy of 13.8 years for the breed compared to an average of 12.7 for purebreeds and 12 for crossbreeds.

The Parson Russell Terrier is one of the more commonly affected breeds for primary lens luxation which is caused by an autosomal recessive mutation of the ADAMTS17 gene.

Other eye conditions which appear in the breed include cataracts in juveniles, corneal dystrophy, progressive retinal atrophy and posterior vitreous detachment. Non-eye breed related conditions which may affect a Parson are deafness and patella luxation.

An inherited form of ataxia has been recognised within the group of Russell terriers (Jack Russell Terrier, Parson Russell Terrier, and Russell Terrier) for more than 50 years. Myokymia and seizures are often seen alongside the condition. A 2014 study identified the KCNJ10 gene as being responsible for the spinocerebellar ataxia accompanied by myokymia and/or seizures in the breed. This condition also affects the closely related Jack Russell Terrier and Russell Terrier.

== In popular culture ==
- Uggie (2002–2015), a trained Parson Russell Terrier, was an animal actor, appearing in commercials starting in 2005 and most notably cast in Water for Elephants and The Artist, both in 2011. In the same year, based on interest following The Artist, the "Consider Uggie" campaign was launched, which attempted to gain the dog a nomination for an Academy Award. In 2012, Uggie was named Nintendo's first-ever spokesdog.
- Sykes (est. 2001–2019), a dog actor from Clifton, Oxfordshire, England, who appeared as "Harvey" in Thinkbox's three televisions commercials and, under his real name, in five seasons of Midsomer Murders. He also appeared in several Hollywood blockbusters, as well as a UK TV movie, several series and miniseries. He retired in 2016 after a long career on the big and small screen. Sykes was also a champion agility competitor.
