= Russell Terrier =

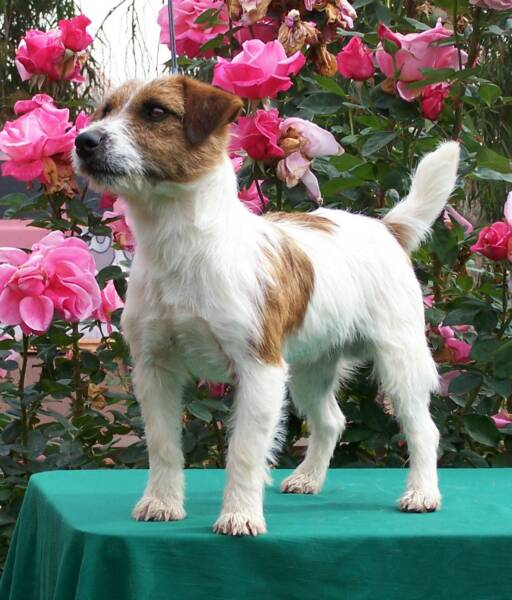
- Other names: F.C.I. Jack Russell Terrier
- Origin: England
Traits
- Colour: white and brown
Kennel club standards
- Fédération Cynologique Internationale: standard
- Notes: Country of Development: Australia. The U.K.C. and A.K.C. Russell Terrier was accepted into both kennel clubs based on the F.C.I. Jack Russell Terrier standard.

The Russell Terrier is a predominantly white working terrier with an instinct to hunt prey underground. The breed was derived from Jack Russell's working terrier strains that were used in the 19th century for fox hunting. Russell's fox working strains were much smaller than the Show Fox Terrier and remained working terriers. The size of the Russell Terrier (10" to 12") combined with a small flexible, spannable chest makes it an ideal size to work efficiently underground. Their unique rectangular body shape with the body being of slightly longer length than the leg makes them distinctly different from the Parson Russell Terrier and the Jack Russell Terrier of the Jack Russell Terrier Club of America (JRTCA).

The Russell Terrier originated in England, but the country of development was Australia.

== History ==
The name Jack Russell Terrier was never used to describe a breed of dog. Rather, it became a common name for any predominantly-white earth-working terrier after the death of the clergyman Jack Russell. The only requisite was color, the instinct combined with the will to employ earth-work, and the size to work efficiently underground. Still today, the name is widely used for working terriers of the Parsons Reverend's style. It was in the country of development, Australia, that this 10-12 inch dog was first standardized by Kennel Club recognition with the official name "Jack Russell Terrier" applied to the breed. This ultimately led to recognition of the breed by FCI (Fédération Cynologique Internationale) countries, including Ireland and most recently, the US. Unfortunately, due to the previous use of the name in the US and England, the name Jack Russell Terrier is conflicting. In the US, a terrier conforming to the Australian/FCI standard is simply called a Russell Terrier.

The Russell Terrier is a very popular companion breed in the US. The breed is a working breed, not a companion breed. They are bred by dedicated fanciers to preserve their working functional conformation and the instinct to employ their original purpose as earth terriers. This makes them an excellent performance breed participating in a variety of events: natural hunting which includes earthwork, agility, rally, obedience, tracking, go-to-ground, and conformation, etc. They are also therapy and service dogs.

=== Breed development in England and Australia ===
In the early 1970s, the Jack Russell Terrier Club of Great Britain was formed, and this body instituted a very primitive form of registration. Soon, Jack Russell Terrier Clubs were being formed worldwide, including Australia. The Jack Russell Terrier Club of Australia was formed in 1972. This national organization set up a particularly comprehensive registration system, along with a formal breed standard. This club also initiated discussions with their KC regarding the possibility of the breed being accepted for registration as a pure breed.

=== The Russell Terrier in the US ===
The Russell Terrier, also known as the FCI type Jack Russell Terrier, is a recognized Kennel Club breed and is maintained separately from the AKC Parson Russell Terrier and the UKC Parson Russell Terrier. In 2001, the United Kennel Club accepted the application from the English Jack Russell Terrier Club to give dogs in their registry the official "FS" designation. UKC officially recognized the breed as the Russell Terrier because the name Jack Russell Terrier was already in use for the longer legged dog in 2001. The UKC breed standard was changed in 2005 from the original standard of 2001. In 2009 the UKC changed the name to Jack Russell to go back to their original standard and align themselves with the rest of the world. The American Kennel Club AKC accepted the breed into the FSS Program on December 8, 2004 based on the FCI Jack Russell standard also submitted by the EJRTC, aka the American Russell Terrier Club. The American Rare Breed Association recognized the "Russell Terrier" in 2003, with the old UKC standard originally written by the UKC. This standard was based on the same standard written by Australia and used also in Ireland. The original ARBA standard was then changed by the NRTFC to a new standard in November 2008, than again on January 1, 2010. The AKC parent club for the Russell Terrier changed the FCI breed standard in 2010 and introduced their own standard which is now different from the rest of the world and FCI. The NRTFC was the first and is the only organization in the world and history of the breed to recognize only the smooth coated dog.

However, after 15 years of maintaining the Russell Terrier in the US and longer internationally as a distinctly separate breed, due to the rectangular appearance unique only to the Jack Russell/Russell Terrier, they can no longer be considered variations.

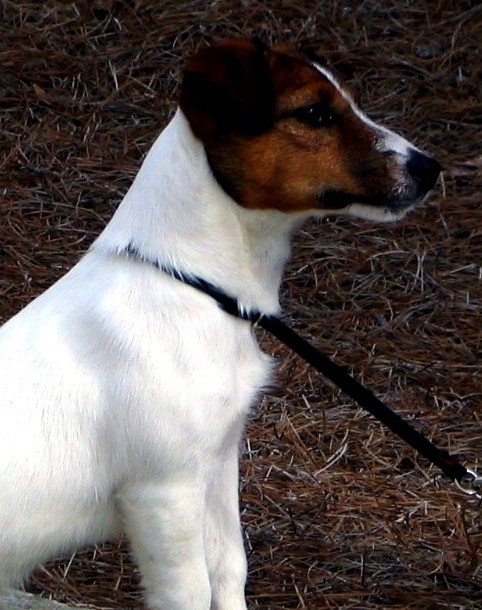
Profile of a smooth Russell Terrier.

== Health ==
An inherited form of ataxia has been recognised within the group of Russell terriers (Jack Russell Terrier, Parson Russell Terrier, and Russell Terrier) for more than 50 years. Myokymia and seizures are often seen alongside the condition. A 2014 study identified the KCNJ10 gene as being responsible for the spinocerebellar ataxia accompanied by myokymia and/or seizures in the breed. This condition also affects the closely related Parson Russell Terrier and Jack Russell Terrier.
