= Thinkbox =

British marketing body

- Formation: 15 February 2005; 21 years ago
- Purpose: Marketing of television advertising
- Headquarters: London
- Members: Channel 4, ITV, Sky Media, UKTV
- Official language: English
- CEO: Lindsey Clay
- Website: thinkbox.tv

Thinkbox is the marketing body for commercial TV in the UK. Its shareholders are Channel 4, ITV, Sky Media and UKTV. Together Thinkbox's shareholders represent over 99% of commercial TV advertising revenue through their owned and partner TV channels. Thinkbox's Associate Members are Amazon, Disney+, DSTv (South Africa), Netflix, STV, TAM Ireland, Think TV (Australia), thinktv (Canada), TVN Media (Poland), Tenk TV (Norway), TV4 (Sweden), Vevo, Virgin Media, and Warner Bros. Discovery (UK & Ireland).

Thinkbox was launched in February 2005 with a consortium consisting of eight companies, and was initially run as a virtual organisation. In 2006 the group changed direction, hiring Tess Alps as the CEO and undergoing significant internal changes, including the loss of one of the original eight companies involved in creating the organisation.

After Lindsey Clay became Thinkbox's CEO in 2013, Tess Alps became Thinkbox Chair. Alps retired from Thinkbox at the end of 2020.

Thinkbox's activities include supporting research into aspects of marketing using television, supporting various television and advertising marketing awards (including their regular creativity awards, The Thinkboxes, and the IPA Effectiveness Awards), running a series of events and training programs, and providing information to marketers about television advertising.

Thinkbox has won a number of industry awards for its research and marketing initiatives. Thinkbox was named Media360’s Industry Body of the Decade and its TV advertising, particularly that featuring ‘Harvey’ the dog, has won many awards. Thinkbox’s most recent TV ad – ‘Tooth Fairy’ – can be seen on screens currently and is the sixth TV ad campaign from Thinkbox.

Thinkbox is a member of The Global TV Group, the informal grouping of TV broadcasters, sales houses, and trade bodies in Europe, the USA, Canada, Australia and Latin America. The Global TV Group is a forum for sharing knowledge, exchanging best practice and collating global TV intelligence

== History ==
Thinkbox was founded in February 2005, by a consortium of eight media companies: Channel 4, Five, GMTV, Sky Media, IDS, ITV, Turner Media Innovations, Viacom Brand Solutions. Thinkbox's budget was set by charging a flat fee to each of the eight member organisations and an additional variable rate tied to their share of the TV advertising market; the new body was developed to improve sales of television advertising. Nevertheless, the member organisations were expected to continue to compete for advertising, and they retained their existing sales departments.

Structurally, Thinkbox began as a virtual organisation, lacking both a dedicated executive body and physical headquarters. Instead of a dedicated executive, the staff working on the project were overseen by a committee consisting of representatives of each of the eight member organisations, and Thinkbox was initially chaired by ITV's Justin Sampson. However, this structure – particularly the lack of an executive body – was met with a degree of criticism from both inside and outside the organisation.

Things changed in 2006. Following Samson's departure from ITV, the role of chair was passed to Channel 4's Andy Barnes and Tess Alps was appointed as the chief executive officer in April of that year. In particular, the appointment of Alps was seen as a positive move by industry commentators: her experience with PHD[?] suggested that she would already be aware of the various personalities and agendas in play, which was highly relevant given the "varying agendas" of the member organisations and the potential for dissent.

Some of this potential for dissent was realised later that year, when, in August 2006, IDS left the consortium. In a statement after its departure, IDS accused Thinkbox of giving in to ITV demands, moving away from a one-member, one-vote model to one which provided greater weight to ITV. (Under the new structure, ITV had gained additional voting power and a veto). Shortly after the departure of IDS, the remaining seven organisations increased the funding being provided to Thinkbox – although the exact figure was not available at the time, it was said to be "substantially bigger" that the £3m which the organisation had been operating with prior to the increase.

In spite of rumours in the first half of 2007 that ITV were considering removing their support from Thinkbox, the remaining seven companies continued to be a part of the organisation. Since the beginning of 2007 Thinkbox established permanent staff and hired Red Brick Road and MediaCom to handle advertising, media buying and strategic consultancy, and they released their first television advertisements. They also inaugurated the annual TV Planning Awards and the monthly Thinkboxes, ran the second of their Thinkbox Experience conferences, as well as the major Televisionaries conference in 2008. http://www.campaignlive.co.uk/analysis/866008/

In February 2011, Lindsey Clay became Thinkbox's first Managing Director having previously been the organisation's Marketing Director. In May 2012 Thinkbox announced that Tess Alps would become its Executive Chair and that the Chair of the Thinkbox board would pass to a different shareholder director every year. Lindsey Clay became CEO.

== Activities ==
=== Research ===
Thinkbox commission and produces regular research focused on issues and trends surrounding television advertising and viewing habits. Recent studies include "Signalling Success" (2020), an analysis of advertising's signalling effect which revealed how media channels differ in their ability to communicate vital brand signs; "Demand Generation" (2019), an award-winning meta-analysis of econometric models conducted by WPP’s MediaCom, Wavemaker and Gain Theory, which resulted in the creation of the "Demand Generator", the first freely available industry planning tool that puts meaningful econometric data in the hands of advertisers of all shapes and sizes; and the award-winning "Profit Ability: the business case for advertising" (2018) by Ebiquity and Gain Theory which quantified advertising's short and long term business impact.

Previous Thinkbox research studies include: "A Matter of Time", which explored the impact of time length in TV advertising; "As seen on TV", which looked at how TV supercharges small business growth; a joint study with the Internet Advertising Bureau (UK) looking at how TV and online advertising work together; an in-depth analysis of how TV sponsorship works; an engagement study examining how consumers engage with TV ads; several "payback" studies examining the impact of TV advertising on long- and short-term sales and brand equity; a study into "Generation Whatever", looking at the lives of young people and their media consumption; an analysis of attitudes towards online TV and how it works with established broadcast TV.; a study with Mediacom examining the impact of television on immediate web response and other short-term response channels; a joint study with the IPA which analysed the correlation between campaigns' performance across a wide range of the world's most respected creative awards determined by The Gunn Report, and their performance in hard business terms recorded in the IPA Effectiveness Awards Databank between 2000 and 2008; a 'TV Together' study that explored the shared viewing experience and the phenomenon of social networking in relation to TV; and a 'Tellyporting' study with Decipher, which involved equipping families with the latest TV technologies to study their impact on TV viewing behaviour.

=== Thinkbox Award Schemes ===
In 2007 Thinkbox, in combination with Campaign and MediaWeek, announced the formation of the TV Planning Awards. The awards were first granted in 2008. In addition, monthly awards, called the Thinkboxes, were inaugurated in May 2008. Working in conjunction with Haymarket Brand Media, the awards are judged by a "Thinkbox Creative Academy" consisting of approximately 100 representatives of the marketing and advertising industries, and are focused on awarding creativity in regard to television advertising.

Thinkbox is involved sponsoring a number of different industry awards, including the IPA Effectiveness Awards, ISBA, The British Arrows.

=== Advertising and publishing ===
Initially campaign development was handled in-house, but in 2007 Thinkbox decided to engage an outside agency. The result was the hiring of Red Brick Road, who were engaged to handle Thinkbox's advertising, online and direct marketing requirements. In 2008 Thinkbox went further, hiring MediaCom to handle their media buying and planning, as well as to provide strategic advice. Under this new approach, Thinkbox's first television advertising campaign – which went on to be awarded by D&AD, the BTAAs, and the APA – was launched in May 2009, with a roadblock advertisement presented across multiple channels.

Thinkbox's 2010 advertising campaign "Every home needs a Harvey"

In September 2010 Thinkbox launched its second TV advertising campaign, featuring a couple visiting a dogs' home to choose a dog to adopt. They encounter a dog called Harvey, played by Sykes, who has made a TV ad. Harvey turns on a TV behind him which plays out an ad showcasing his amazing skills such as playing chess, doing the school run, cooking, ironing, and cleaning windows. Harvey's ad ends with the line 'Every home needs a Harvey'. The soundtrack to the ad is Bachman-Turner Overdrive's 1974 classic You Ain't Seen Nothin' Yet. The ad ends with the lines 'Discover the power of TV advertising at www.thinkbox.tv' and 'Television: where brands get their breaks’. The ad featuring Harvey the dog was voted Ad of the Year by ITV viewers in December 2010.

In May 2012 Thinkbox launched a second TV campaign featuring Harvey the dog. In this new ad, Harvey used emotional story-telling to change his owner's behaviour dramatically and persuade him not to throw away his best friend and constant companion, a stuffed toy called Rabbit. It opens at the moment that Harvey’s owner is about to put the well-worn, slobber-covered Rabbit in the bin while Harvey is apparently not around. Harvey suddenly appears and plays a TV ad telling the story of how he and Rabbit became friends and the scrapes they’ve got into together over the years.

Thinkbox's third TV ad was in 2014 - "Harvey and Harmony" - and again featured Harvey the dog, this time telling the story of how he used the power of TV advertising to persuade his owner to let the love of his life come and live with them. This was the final Harvey ad and was followed by a new creative approach in 2016 with a TV ad called "The Broadcast" in which aliens suddenly appear on TV screens across the UK to announce they are coming to earth. Cue bedlam as the nation rushes to greet the.

In 2019 Thinkbox hired a new creative agency - Mother London - after a competitive pitch. They created their sixth TV ad - "Tooth Fairy" - which shows the transformative effect TV advertising has on a business. The ad tells the story of the Tooth Fairy’s struggle to build her collections and deliveries business until her decision to advertise on TV expands her business to a wider audience.

In 2023, Thinkbox created their seventh ad; the second to be created by Mother London. Titled "Happily Ever After", it focuses on lawyer Michael Goose, who specialises in nursery rhyme themed cases, and whose law firm is greatly benefitted by advertising it on TV.

Thinkbox's content team produce films on TV and TV advertising, many of which can be watched on its website.

=== Training ===
Thinkbox hosts events on TV advertising featuring well-known industry figures. Thinkbox's planning team runs a series of training courses. The courses are aimed primarily at people who have recently joined a media agency, advertising agency or advertiser but are also available to new starters at broadcasters or sales houses.

In 2020 Thinkbox launched TV Masters, a free and fully accredited online training course in TV advertising. It was designed in collaboration with broadcasters, agencies and advertisers to help boost critical skills and knowledge across the industry. TV Masters draws from a rich databank of academic research, industry studies, thought leadership, brand case studies, and practical media and marketing expertise. It is split into six modules: All about viewing, All about ads, Planning and buying TV, Advertising effectiveness, TV partnerships, and Advanced TV advertising. Just a week after its launch on 12 October 2020, over 2,000 people from across the media and marketing industry signed up to Thinkbox’s TV Masters training course. 2,000 was the target for its first year.

=== Events ===
The first major event funded by Thinkbox was the 2005 "Thinkbox Experience" – a short conference that was attended by approximately 600 delegates and which was generally well received by the industry. A second Thinkbox Experience was not held in 2006, as the organisation decided to direct their efforts towards research that year. As a result, the next conference was held in 2007.

Thinkbox hosts a rolling programme of events designed to help people understand how to get the best of TV. The events are often held to launch new Thinkbox research. Recent events include 'Screen Life: TV in Demand', 'TV Nation', 'POETIC: connecting paid, owned and earned media', 'TV Creativity: the art of the heart', and 'Advertising Effectiveness: the long and short of it'
