= Western saloon =

Historical type of American bar

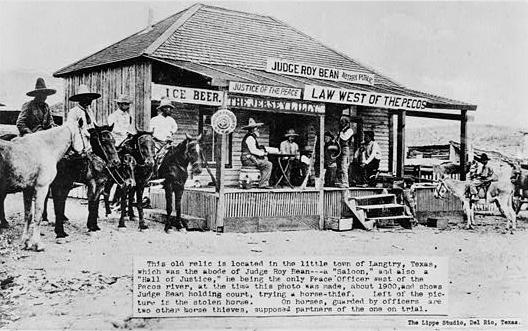
The Jersey Lilly, Judge Roy Bean's saloon in Langtry, Texas, c. 1900

A Western saloon is a kind of bar particular to the Old West. Saloons served customers such as fur trappers, cowboys, soldiers, lumberjacks, businessmen, lawmen, outlaws, miners, and gamblers. A saloon might also be known as a "watering trough, bughouse, shebang, cantina, grogshop, and gin mill". The first saloon was established at Brown's Hole, Wyoming, in 1822, to serve fur trappers.

By 1880, the growth of saloons was in full swing. In Leavenworth, Kansas, there were "about 150 saloons and four wholesale liquor houses". Some saloons in the Old West were little more than casinos, brothels, and opium dens.

== Etymology ==
The word saloon originated as an alternative form of the French word salon; it first appeared in 17th century France and was derived from the Italian salone (for a large reception hall of Italian mansions). A European salon became associated with a 'large hall in a public place for entertainment, etc.'" In the United States, the word had evolved into "saloon" with its present meaning by 1841.

== History ==
Saloons in the U.S. began to have a close association with breweries in the early 1880s. With a growing overcapacity, breweries began to adopt the British "tied-house" system of control where they owned saloons outright. Schlitz Brewing Company and a few others built elaborate saloons to attract customers and advertise their beers.

Politicians also frequented local saloons because of the adaptable social nature of their business.

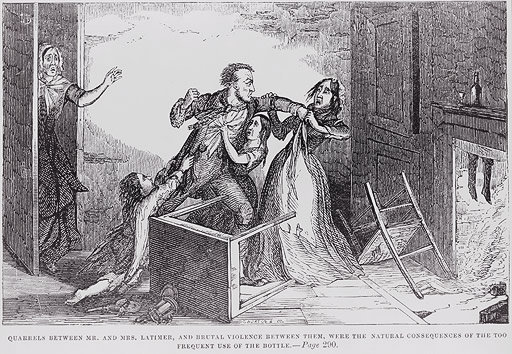
Temperance illustration of drunkard hitting his wife

Beginning in 1893, the Anti-Saloon League began protesting against American saloons. In 1895 it became a national organization and quickly rose to become the most powerful prohibition lobby in America, pushing aside its older competitors the Woman's Christian Temperance Union and the Prohibition Party. The League lobbied at all levels of government for legislation to prohibit the manufacture or import of spirits, beer and wine. Ministers had launched several efforts to close Arizona saloons after the 1906 creation of League chapters in Yuma, Tucson, and Phoenix. League members pressured local police to take licenses from establishments that violated closing hours or served women and minors, and they provided witnesses to testify about these violations. Its triumph was nationwide prohibition locked into the Constitution with passage of the 18th Amendment in 1920. It was decisively defeated when prohibition was repealed in 1933.

=== Free lunch ===
The free lunch was a sales enticement which offered a meal at no cost in order to attract customers and increase revenues from other offerings. It was a tradition once common in saloons in many places in the United States, with the phrase appearing in U.S. literature from about 1870 to the 1920s. These establishments included a "free" lunch, varying from rudimentary to quite elaborate, with the purchase of at least one drink. These free lunches were typically worth far more than the price of a single drink. The saloon-keeper relied on the expectation that most customers would buy more than one drink, and that the practice would build patronage for other times of day.

== Appearance ==
A saloon's appearance varied from when and where it grew. As towns grew, the saloons became more refined. The bartender prided himself on his appearance and his drink pouring abilities. Early saloons and those in remote locations were often crude affairs with minimal furniture and few decorations. Often a single wood-burning stove might warm such establishments during the winter months.

A pair of "batwing" doors at the entrance was one of the more distinctive features of the typical saloon. The doors operated on double action hinges and extended from chest to knee level. Further in the American West, some sold liquor from wagons, and saloons were often formed of materials at hand, including "sod houses. ...a hull of an old sailing ship" or interiors "dug into the side of a hill". As the size of towns grew, many hotels included saloons, and some stand-alone saloons, such as the Barlow Trail Saloon in Damascus, Oregon, featured a railed porch.

Saloons' appearance varied by ethnic group. The Irish preferred stand-up bars where whiskey was the drink of choice and women could obtain service only through the back door. German saloons were more brightly illuminated, more likely to serve restaurant food and beer at tables, and more oriented toward family patronage. Germans were often at odds with Temperance forces over Sunday operation and over the operation of beer gardens in outlying neighborhoods. Other ethnic groups added their own features and their unique cuisines on the sideboard, while a few groups, including Scandinavians, Jews, Greeks, and Italians, either preferred intimate social clubs or did little drinking in public.

== Entertainment ==
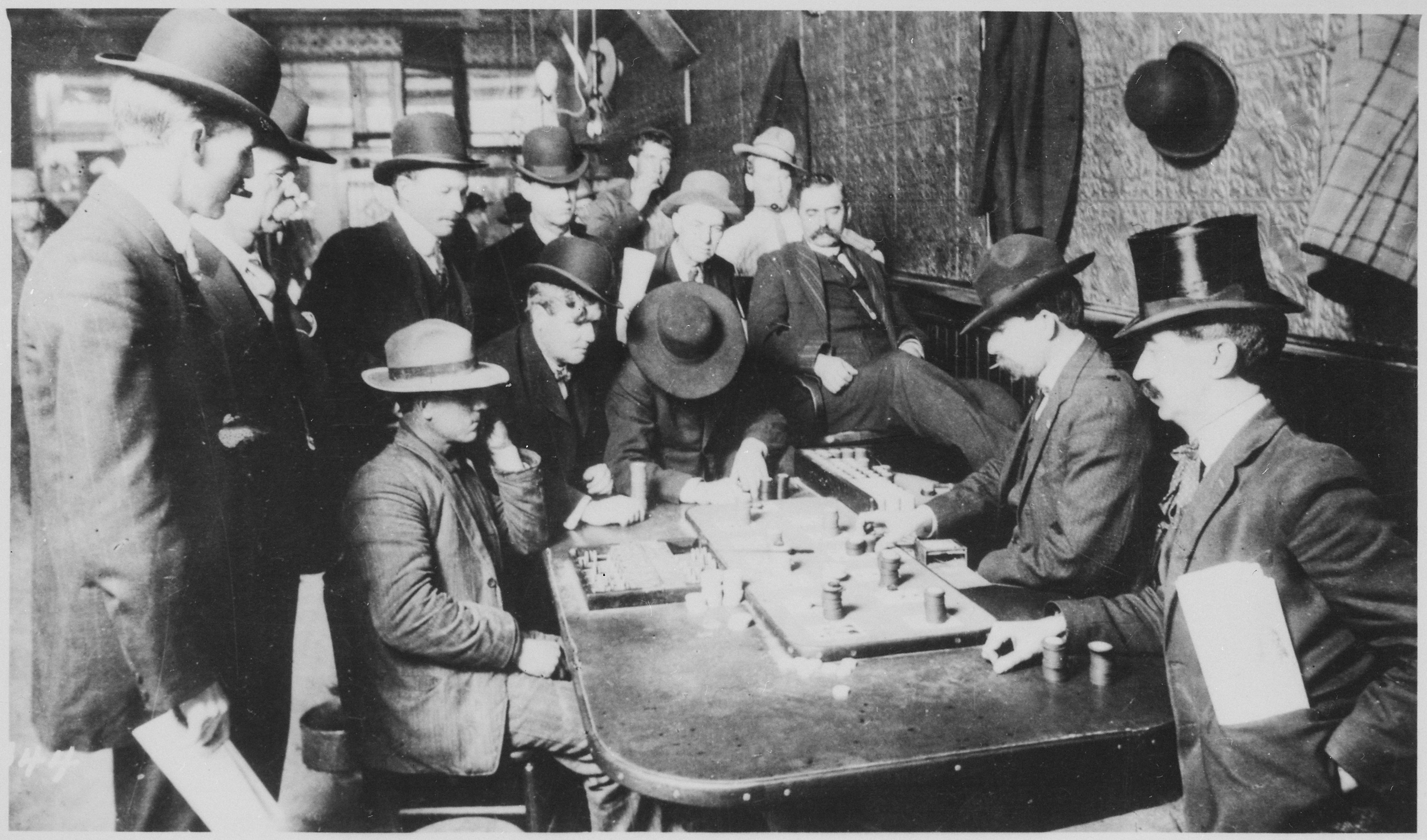
Gambling at the Orient Saloon in Bisbee, Arizona, c.1900. Photograph by C.S. Fly.

By way of entertainment saloons offered dancing girls, some (or most) of whom occasionally or routinely doubled as prostitutes. Many saloons offered games of chance like Faro, poker, brag, three-card monte, and dice games. Other games were added as saloons continued to prosper and face increasing competition. These additional games included billiards, darts, and bowling. Some saloons even included piano players, can-can girls, and theatrical skits. A current example of this type of entertainment is the Long Branch Variety Show that is presented in the recreated Long Branch Saloon in Dodge City, Kansas.

=== Alcohol ===
When a town was first founded, the initial saloons were often nothing more than tents or shacks that served homemade whiskey that included such ingredients as "raw alcohol, burnt sugar and chewing tobacco".

==== Rotgut ====
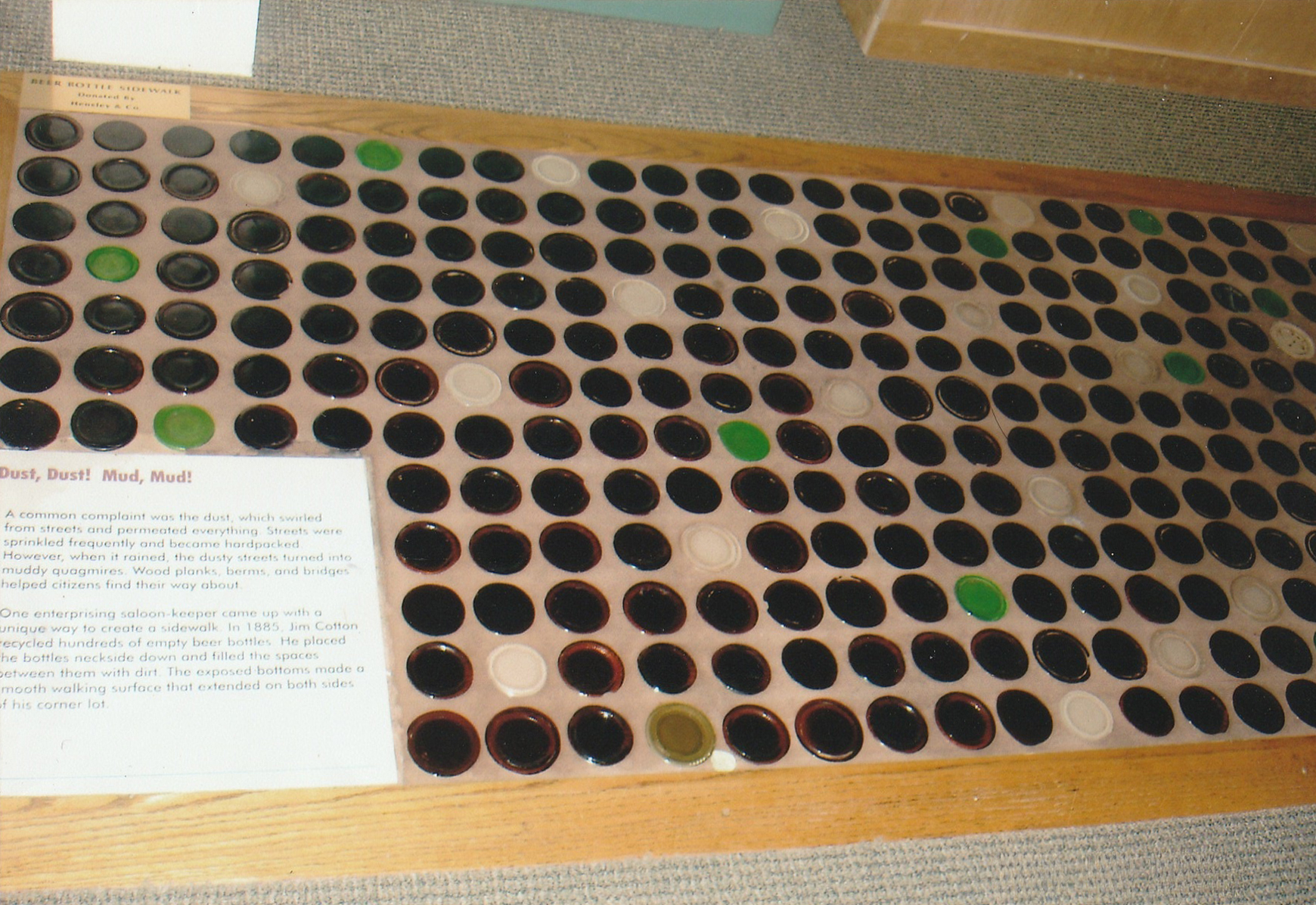
The 1885 Beer Bottle Sidewalk in front of Jim Cotton's Saloon on Washington Street in Phoenix, Arizona

As towns grew, saloons were often elaborately decorated, featured Bohemian stemware, and oil paintings were hung from the wall. The hard liquor was improved, often featuring whiskey imported from the Eastern United States and Europe. To avoid rotgut, patrons would request "fancy" mixed drinks. Some of the top ten drinks in 1881 included claret sangarees and champagne flips.

==== Beer ====
Beer was often served at room temperature since refrigeration was mostly unavailable. Adolphus Busch introduced refrigeration and pasteurization of beer in 1880 with his Budweiser brand. Some saloons kept the beer in kegs stored on racks inside the saloon. Some saloons made their own beer. Sometimes the beer was also kept in chairs, as seen in the motion picture Fort Apache (1948).

== Notable saloons ==
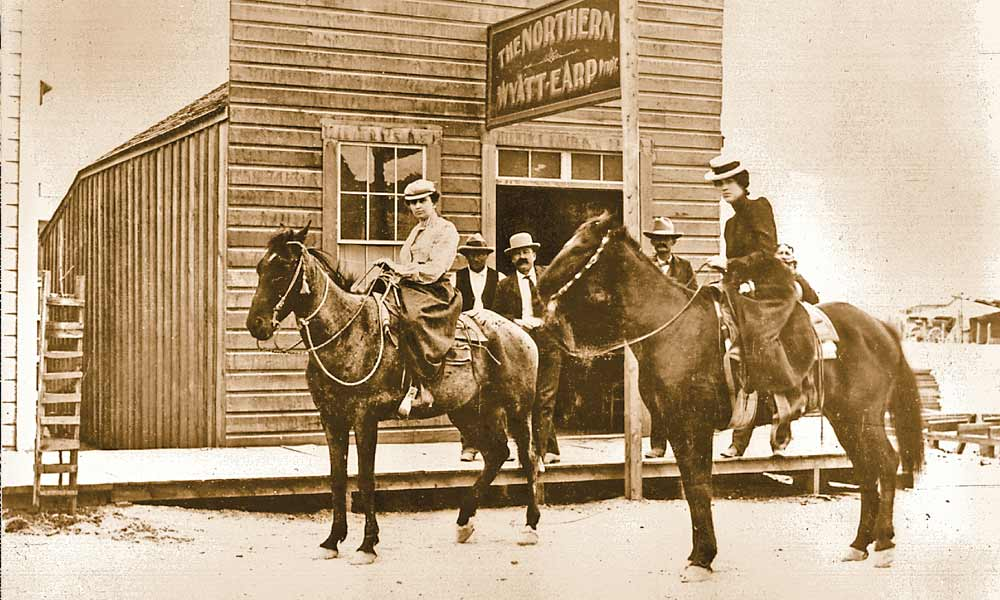
The Northern, Wyatt Earp's saloon in Tonopah, Nevada, c.1902. Josie Earp may be the woman on the horse at left.

Among the more familiar saloons were First Chance Saloon in Miles City, Montana; the Bull's Head in Abilene, Kansas; the Arcade Saloon in Eldora, Colorado; the Holy Moses in Creede, Colorado; the Long Branch Saloon in Dodge City, Kansas; the Birdcage Theater in Tombstone, Arizona; the Bucket of Blood Saloon in Virginia City, Nevada; and the Jersey Lilly in Langtry, Texas. Many of these establishments remained open twenty-four hours a day, six days a week except Sundays and Christmas.

=== Bull's Head ===
In the American West, occasional incidents were connected to saloons. Phil Coe, the owner of the Bull's Head tavern in Abilene, Kansas, outraged the townspeople by painting a bull, complete with an erect penis (pizzle), on the outside wall of his tavern. The marshal at the time, Wild Bill Hickok, threatened to burn the saloon to the ground if the offending animal was not painted over. Instead, he hired some men to do the job, which angered Coe. The two became enemies and in a later altercation, Wild Bill Hickok killed Coe.

Wild Bill, also a professional lawman, gunfighter, and gambler, was later killed on August 2, 1876, by Jack McCall, who shot him in the back of the head, in Saloon No. 10, in Deadwood, South Dakota, as Wild Bill was playing cards. His hand—aces and eights, according to tradition—has become known as the "dead man's hand".

=== Wyatt Earp's saloons ===
Former lawman, faro dealer, and gambler Wyatt Earp worked in or owned several saloons during his lifetime, outright or in partnership with others. He and two of his brothers arrived in Tombstone, Arizona, on December 1, 1879, and during January 1881, Oriental Saloon owner Lou Rickabaugh gave Wyatt Earp a one-quarter interest in the faro concession at the Oriental Saloon in exchange for his services as a manager and enforcer. Wyatt invited his friend, lawman and gambler Bat Masterson, to Tombstone to help him run the faro tables in the Oriental Saloon. In 1884, after leaving Tombstone, Wyatt and his wife Josie, Warren, James and Bessie Earp went to Eagle City, Idaho, another boom town. Wyatt was looking for gold in the Murray-Eagle mining district. They opened a saloon called The White Elephant in a circus tent. An advertisement in a local newspaper suggested gentlemen "come and see the elephant".

In 1885, Earp and Josie moved to San Diego where the railroad was about to arrive and a real estate boom was underway. They stayed for about four years. Earp speculated in San Diego's booming real estate market. Between 1887 and around 1896 he bought three saloons and gambling halls, one on Fourth Street and the other two near Sixth and E, all in the "respectable" part of town. They offered twenty-one games including faro, blackjack, poker, keno, and other Victorian games of chance like pedro and monte. At the height of the boom, he made up to $1,000 a night in profit. Wyatt particularly favored and may have run the Oyster Bar located in the Louis Bank of Commerce on Fifth Avenue.

In the fall of 1897, Earp and Josie joined in the Alaska Gold Rush and headed for Nome, Alaska. He operated a canteen during the summer of 1899 and in September, Earp and partner Charles Ellsworth Hoxie built the Dexter Saloon in Nome, Alaska, the city's first two-story wooden building and its largest and most luxurious saloon. The building was used for a variety of purposes because it was so large: 70 by 30 feet (21.3 m × 9.1 m) with 12 feet (3.7 m) ceilings.

Wyatt and Josie returned to California in 1901 with an estimated $80,000. In February 1902, they arrived in Tonopah, Nevada, where gold had been discovered and a boom was under way. He opened the Northern Saloon in Tonopah, Nevada, and served as a deputy U.S. Marshal under Marshal J.F. Emmitt. His saloon, gambling and mining interests were profitable for a period.

== Gallery ==
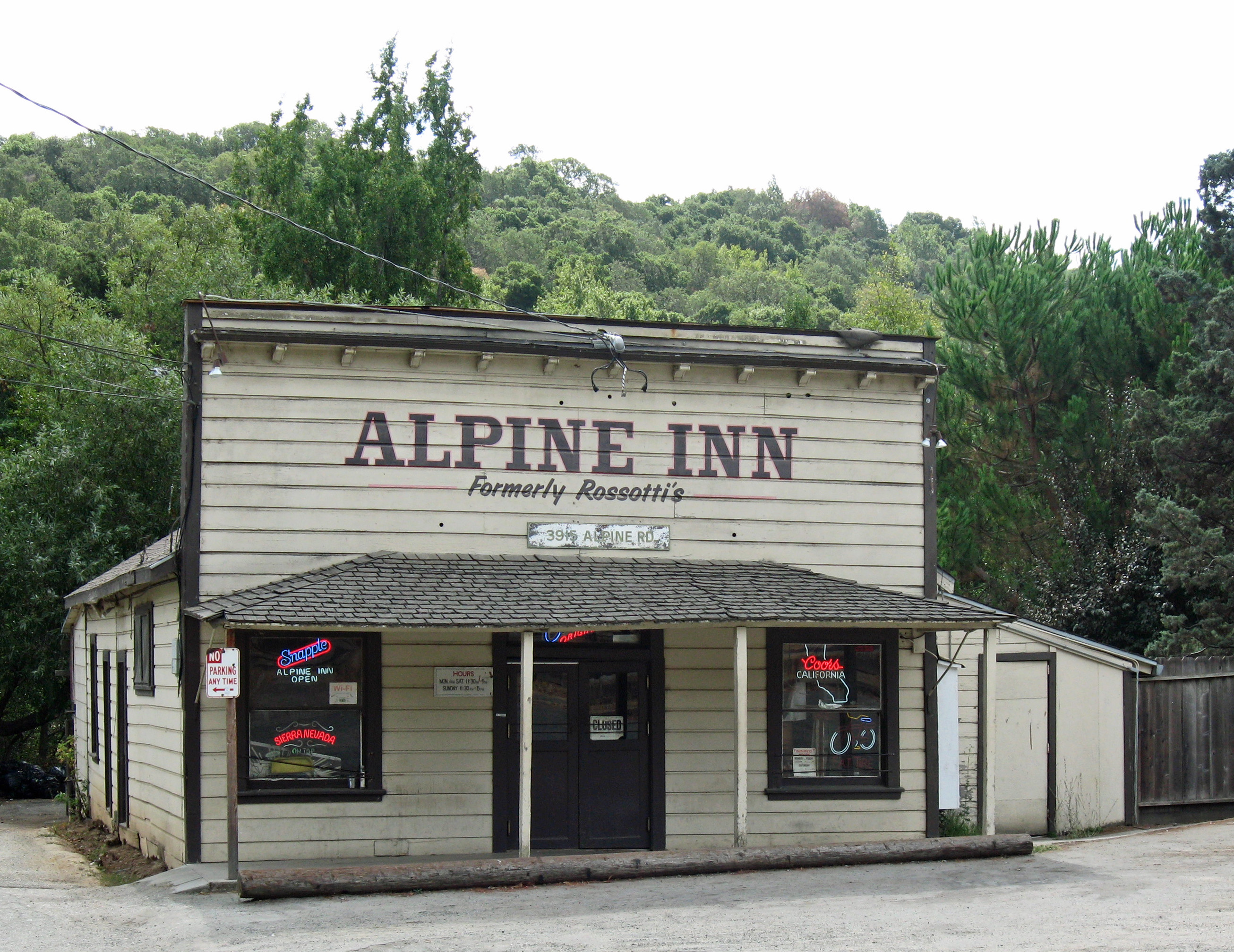
The Alpine Inn, formerly Rossotti's Saloon, in Portola Valley, California. Built in 1850.

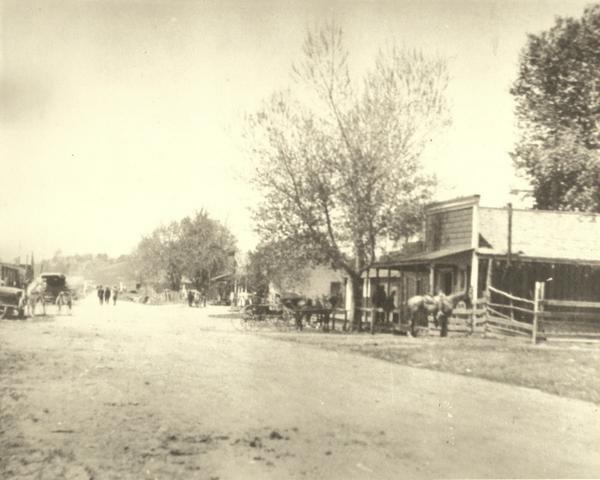
The Pozo Saloon (right) in Pozo, California. Built in 1858.

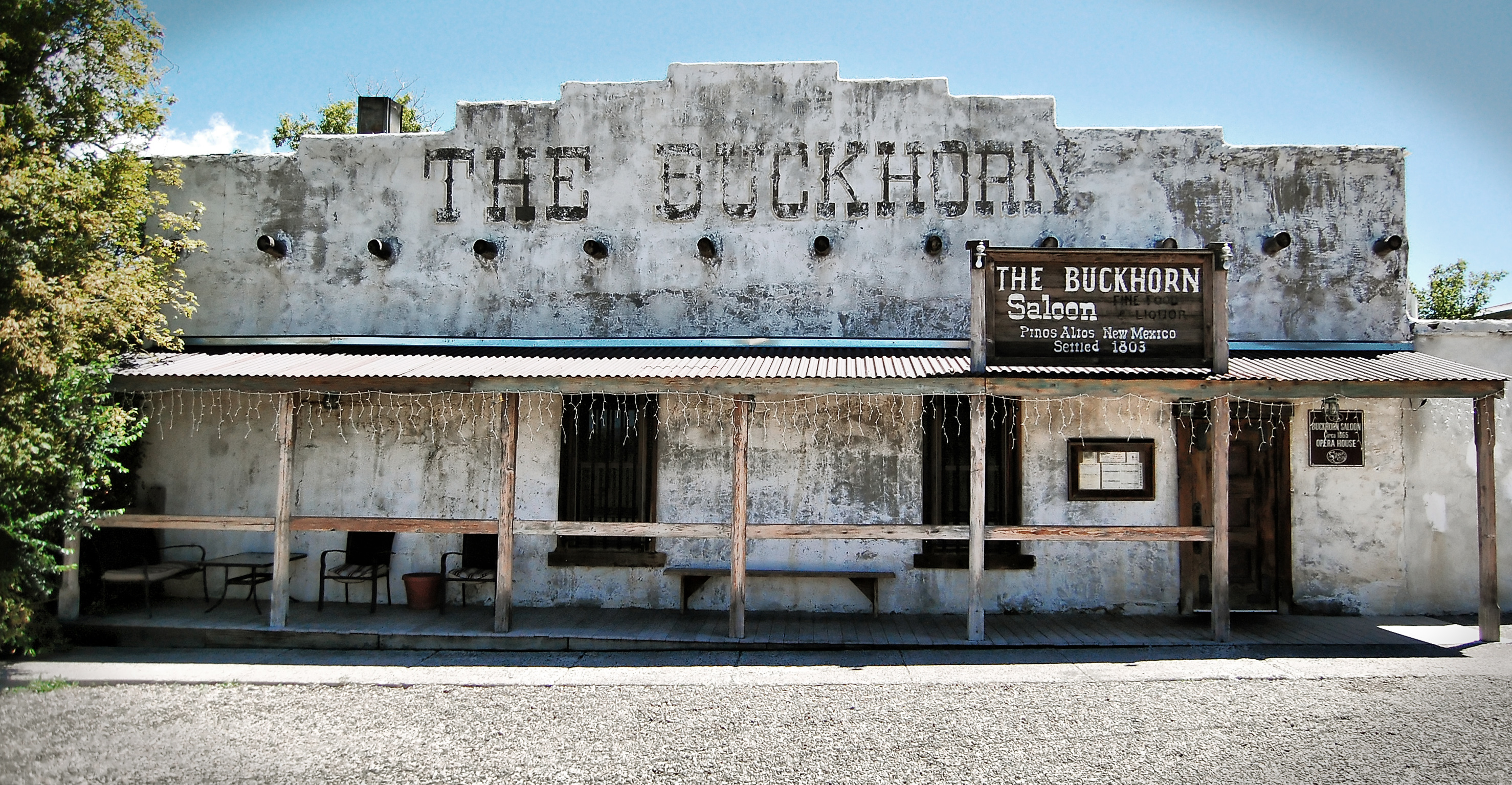
The Buckhorn Saloon in Pinos Altos, New Mexico. Built in c.1860.

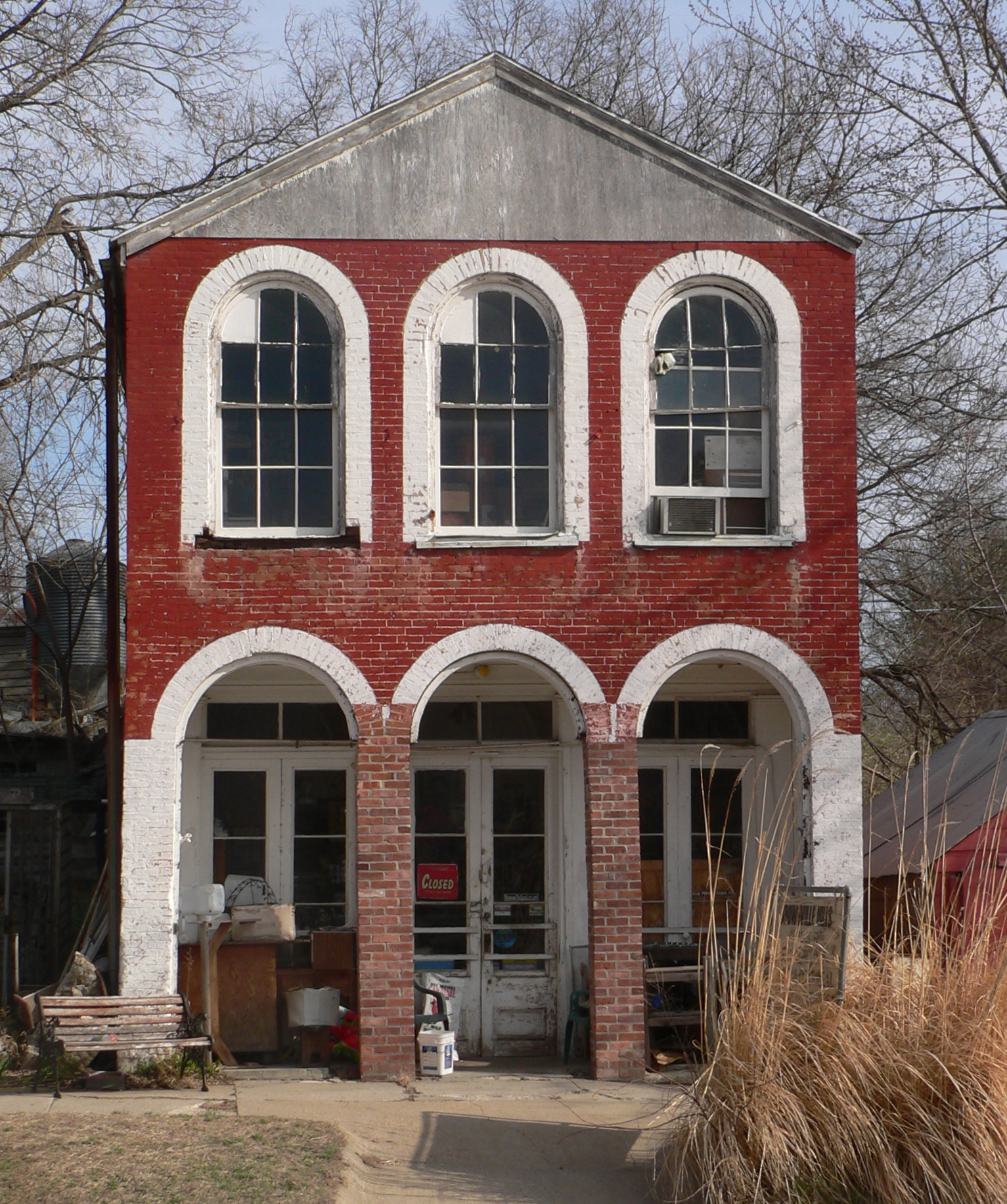
The Lone Tree Saloon in Brownville, Nebraska. Built in c.1868.

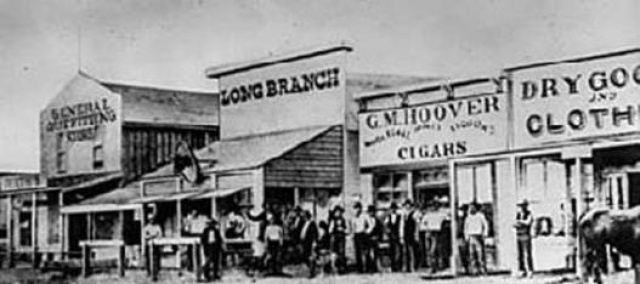
The Long Branch Saloon in Dodge City, Kansas. Built in c.1874.

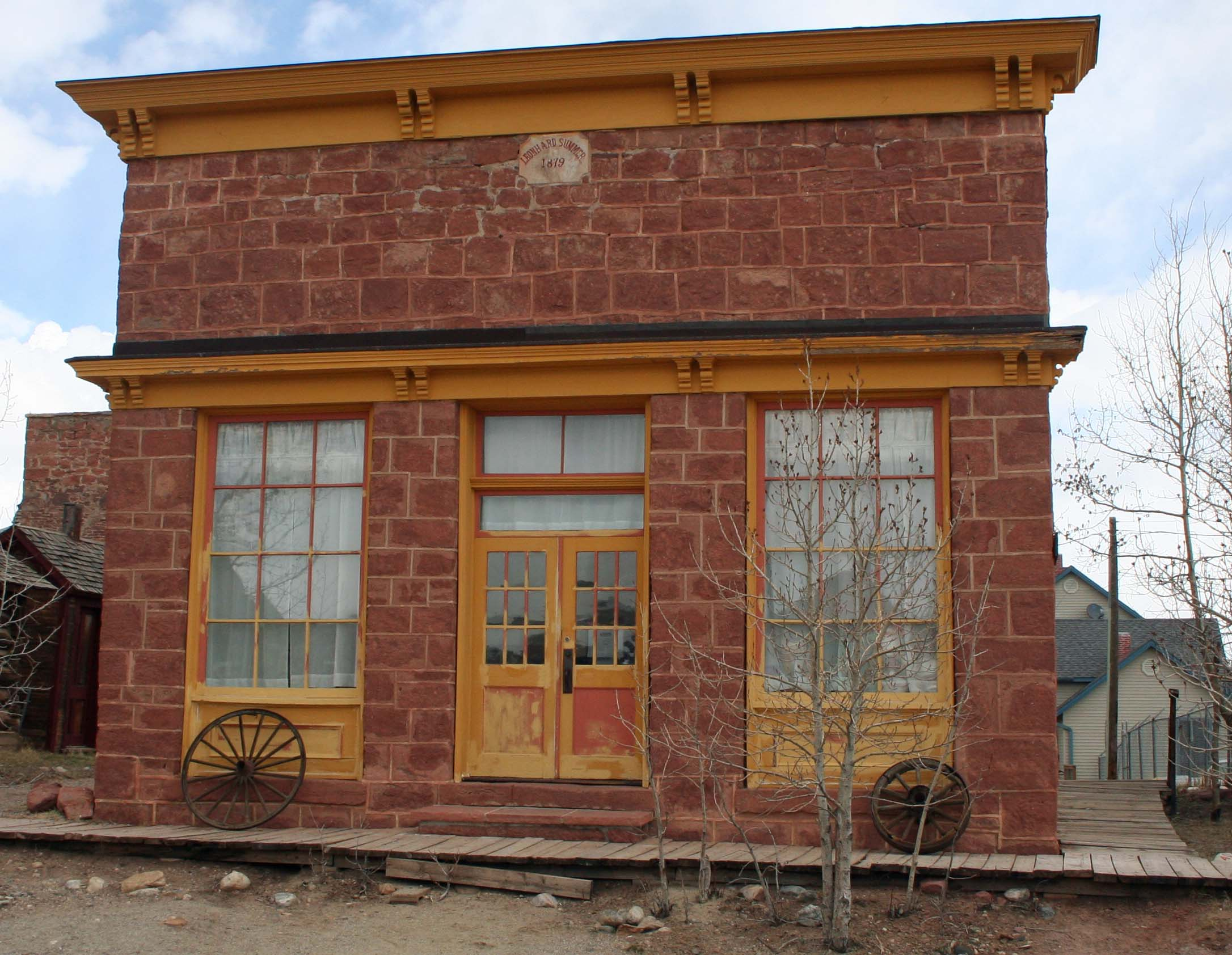
The Summer Saloon in Fairplay, Colorado. Built in 1879.

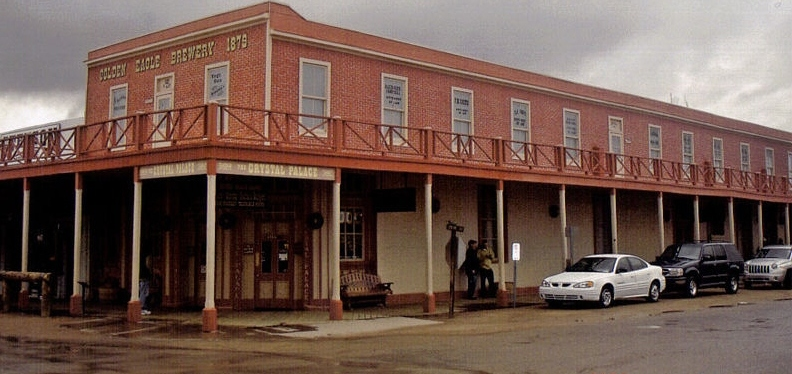
The Crystal Palace, formerly the Golden Eagle Brewery, in Tombstone, Arizona. Built in 1879.

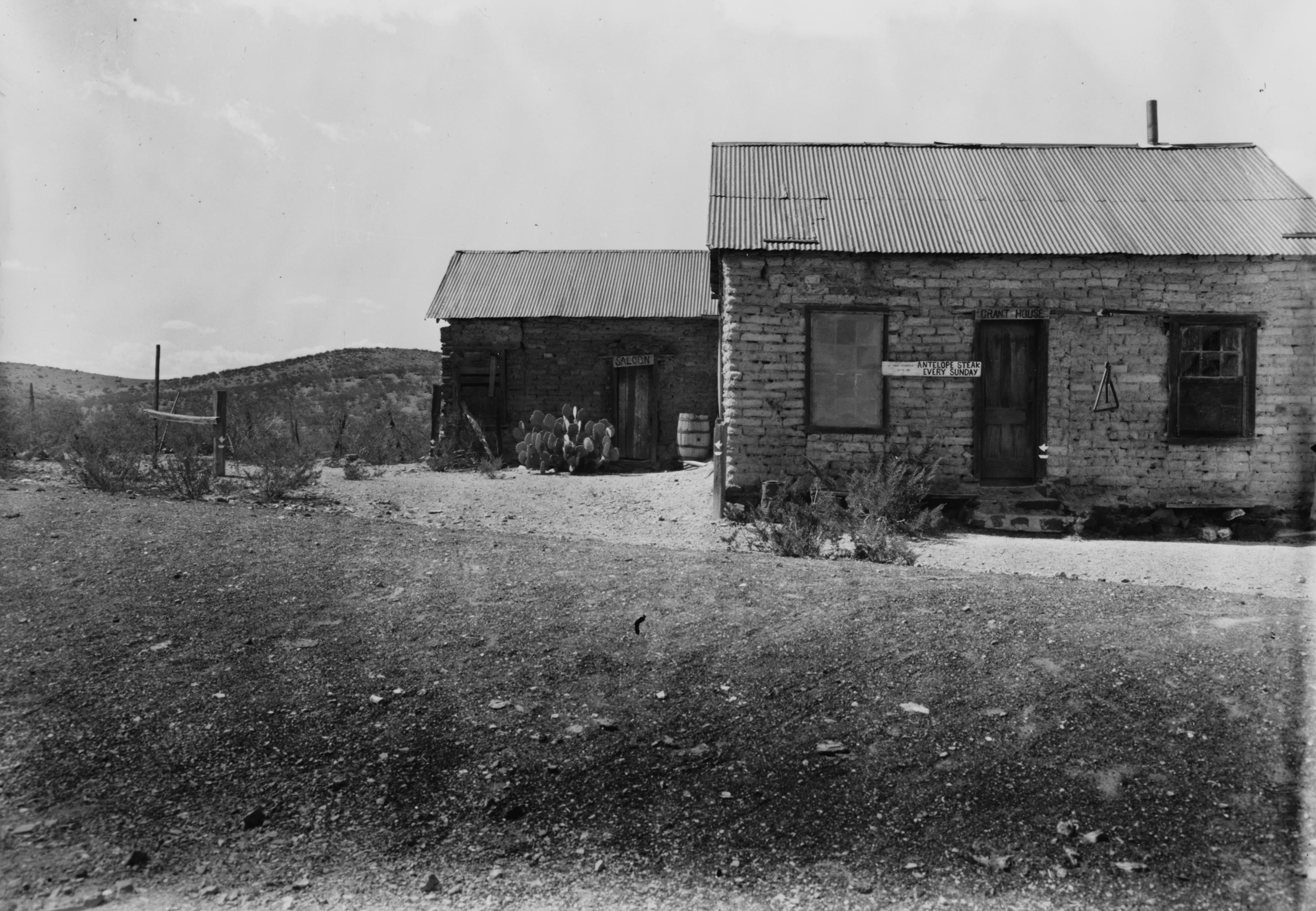
Saloon (left) in Shakespeare, New Mexico. Built in c.1880.

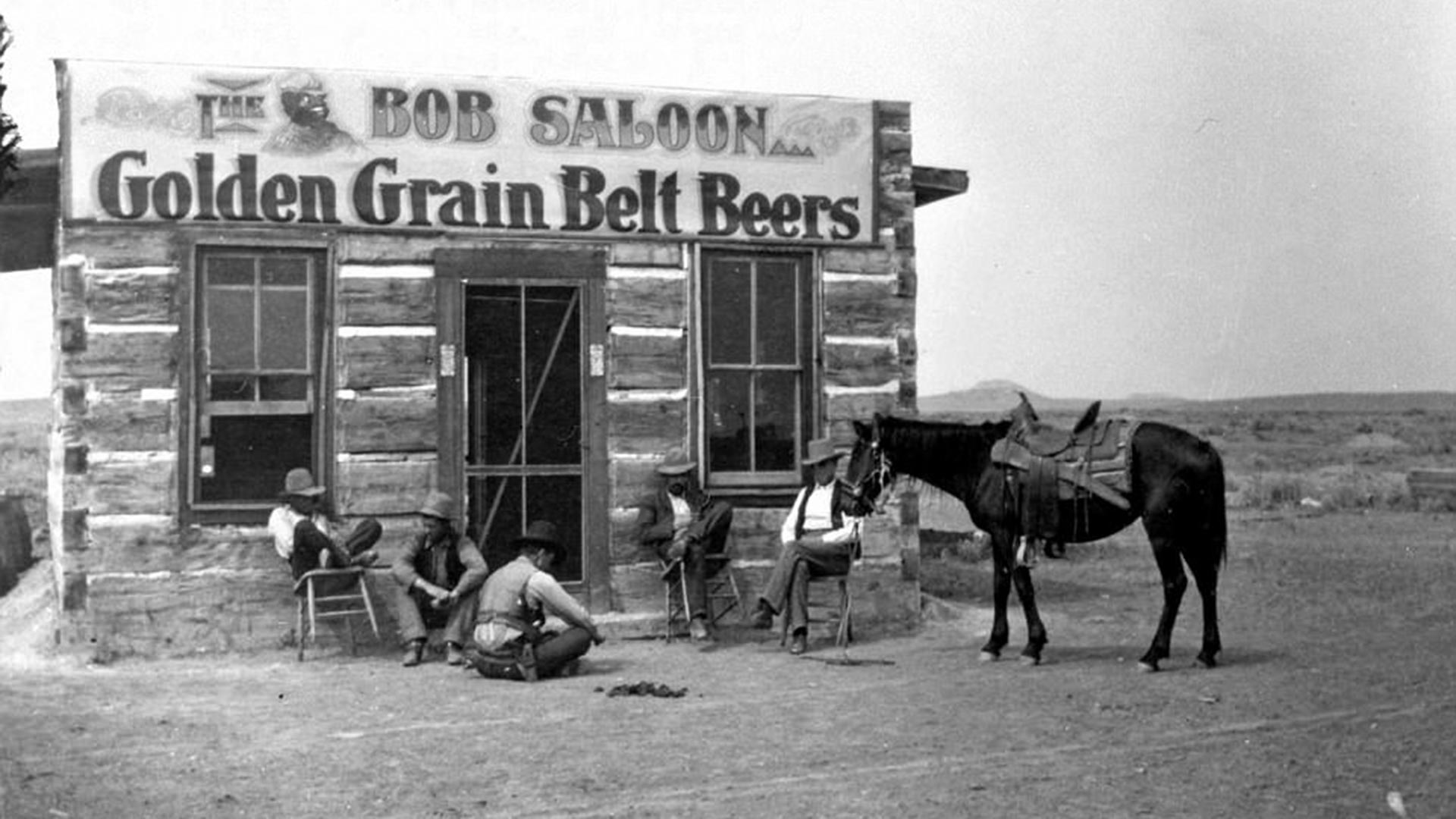
"The Bob Saloon" in Miles City, Montana, 1880

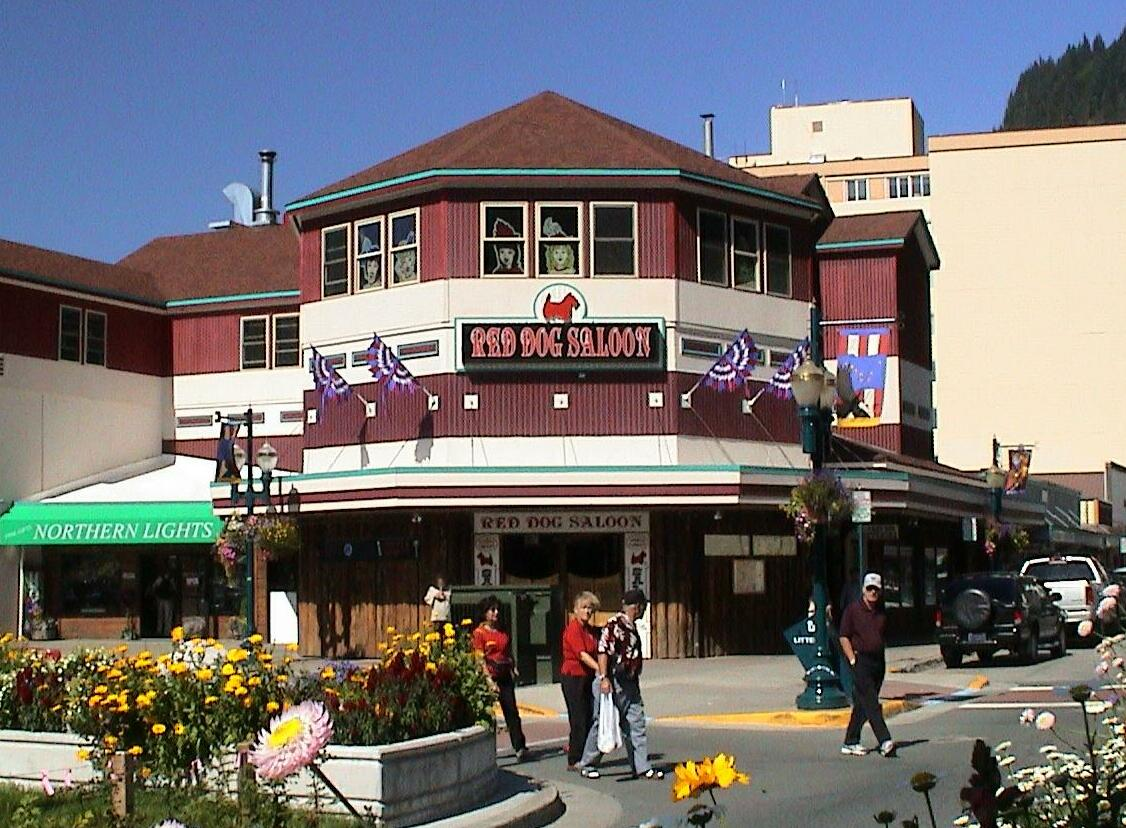
The Red Dog Saloon in Juneau, Alaska. Built in c.1881.

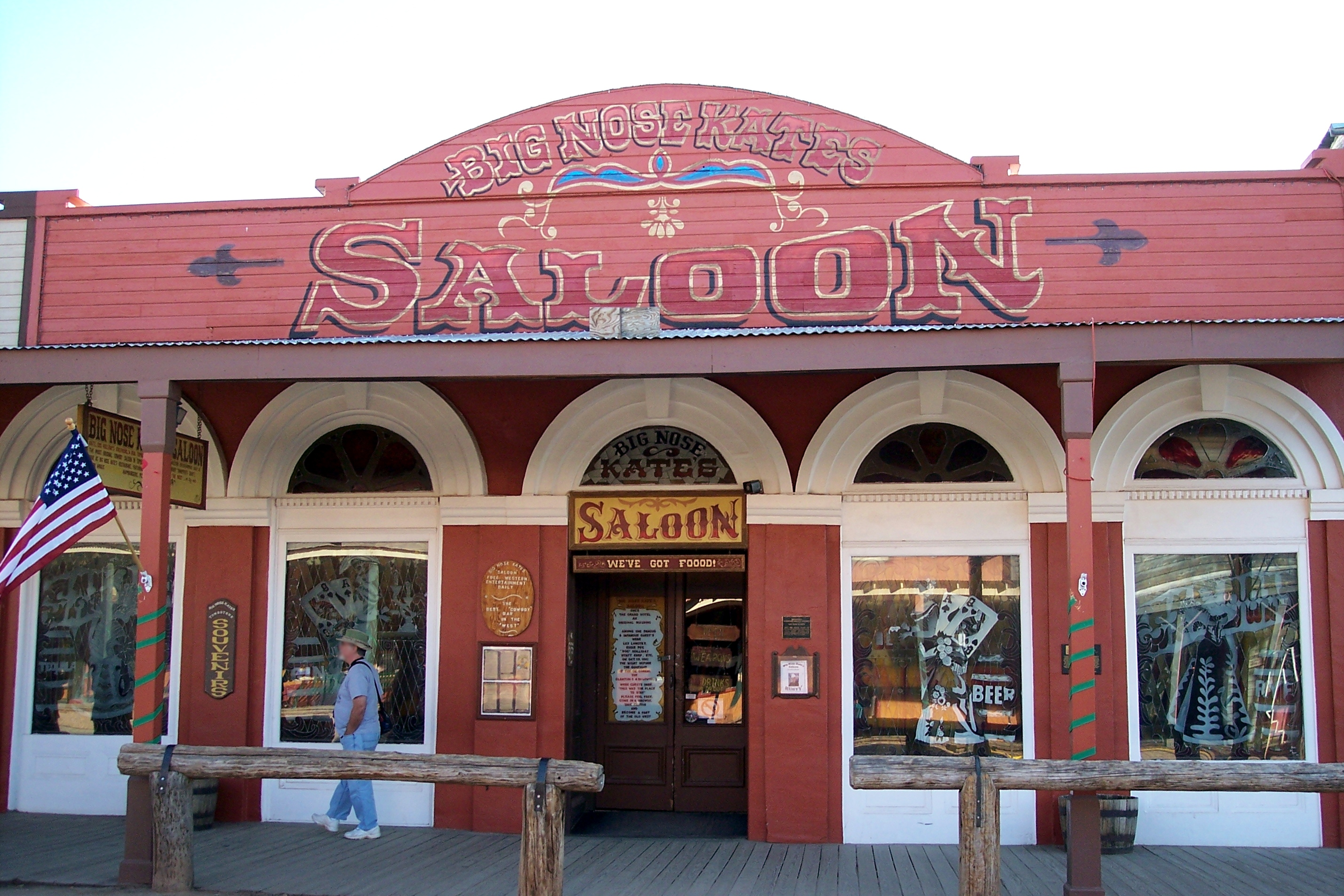
Big Nose Kate's Saloon, formerly the Grand Hotel, in Tombstone, Arizona. Built in 1881.

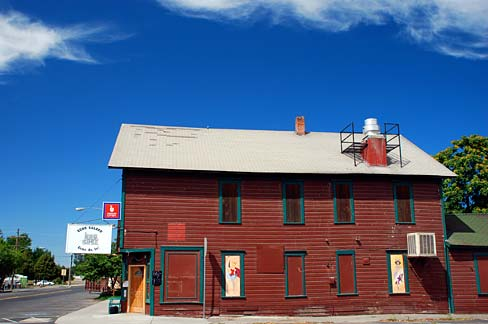
The Echo Saloon in Echo, Oregon. Built in c.1883.

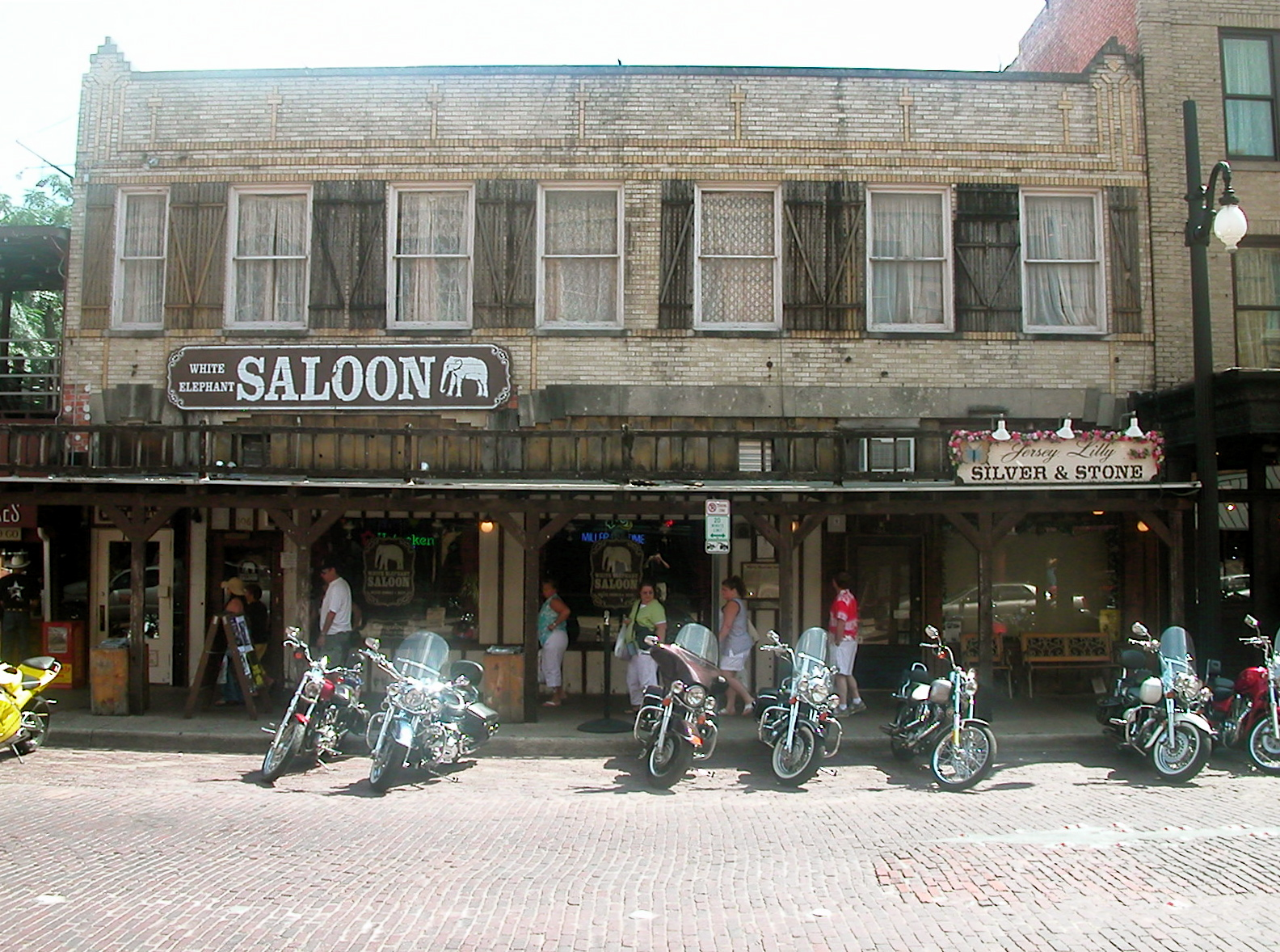
The White Elephant Saloon in Fort Worth, Texas. Built in 1884.

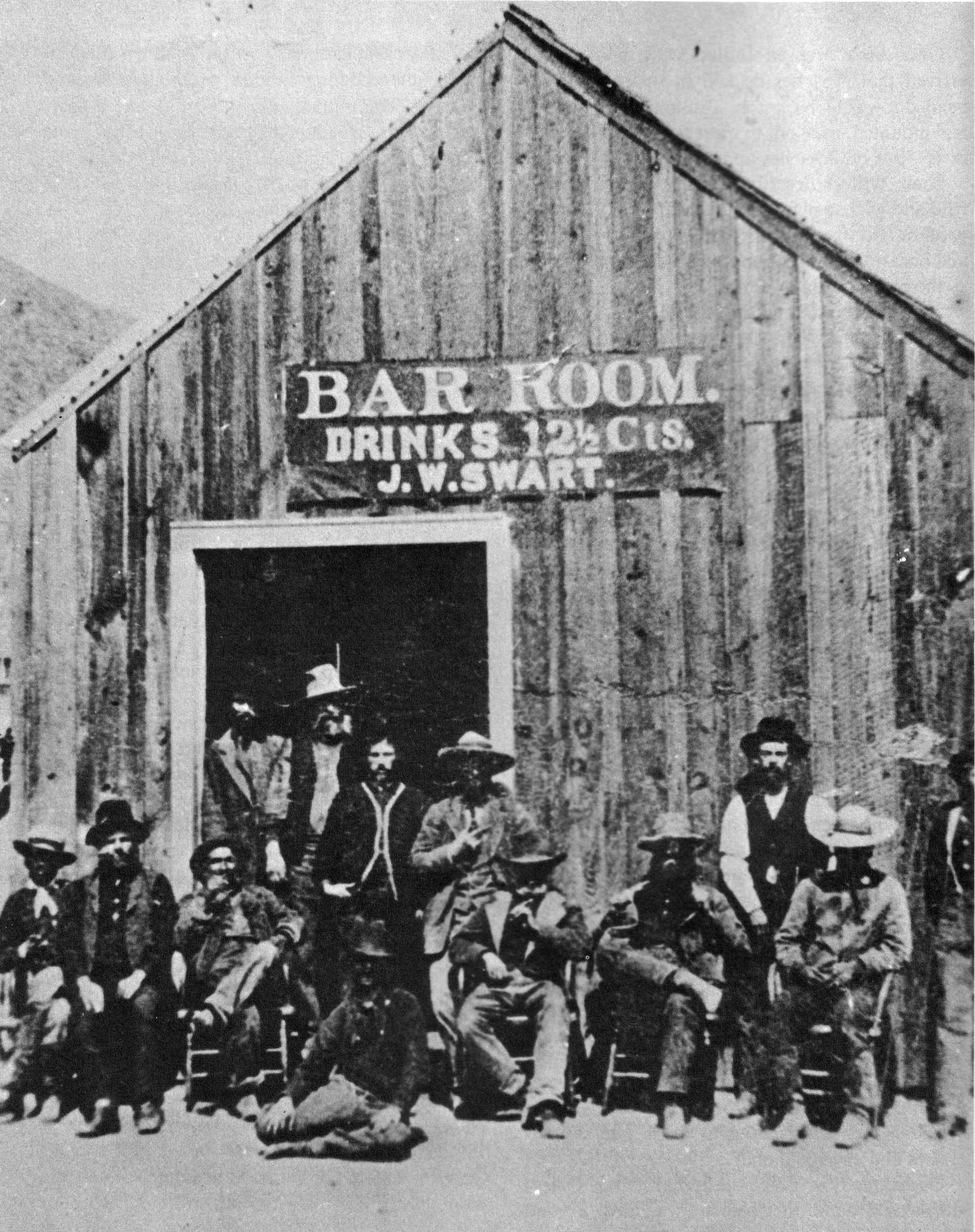
The Bar Room in 1885 Charleston, Arizona

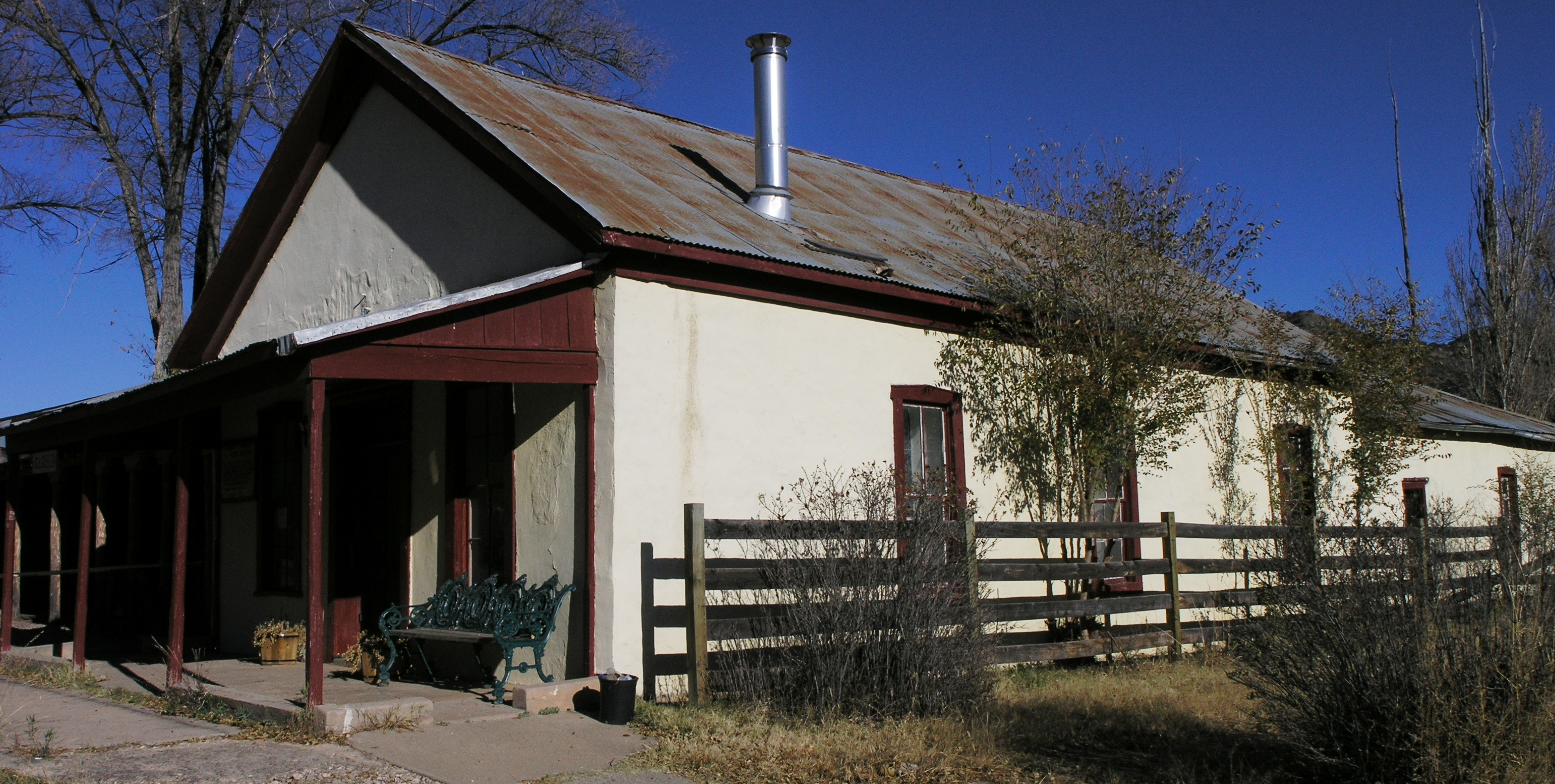
The Curry Saloon in Lincoln, New Mexico. Built in 1887.

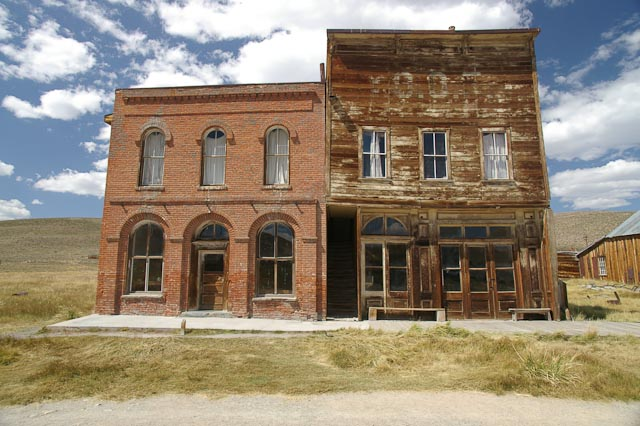
The Bodie Saloon (left) in Bodie, California. Built in c.1892.

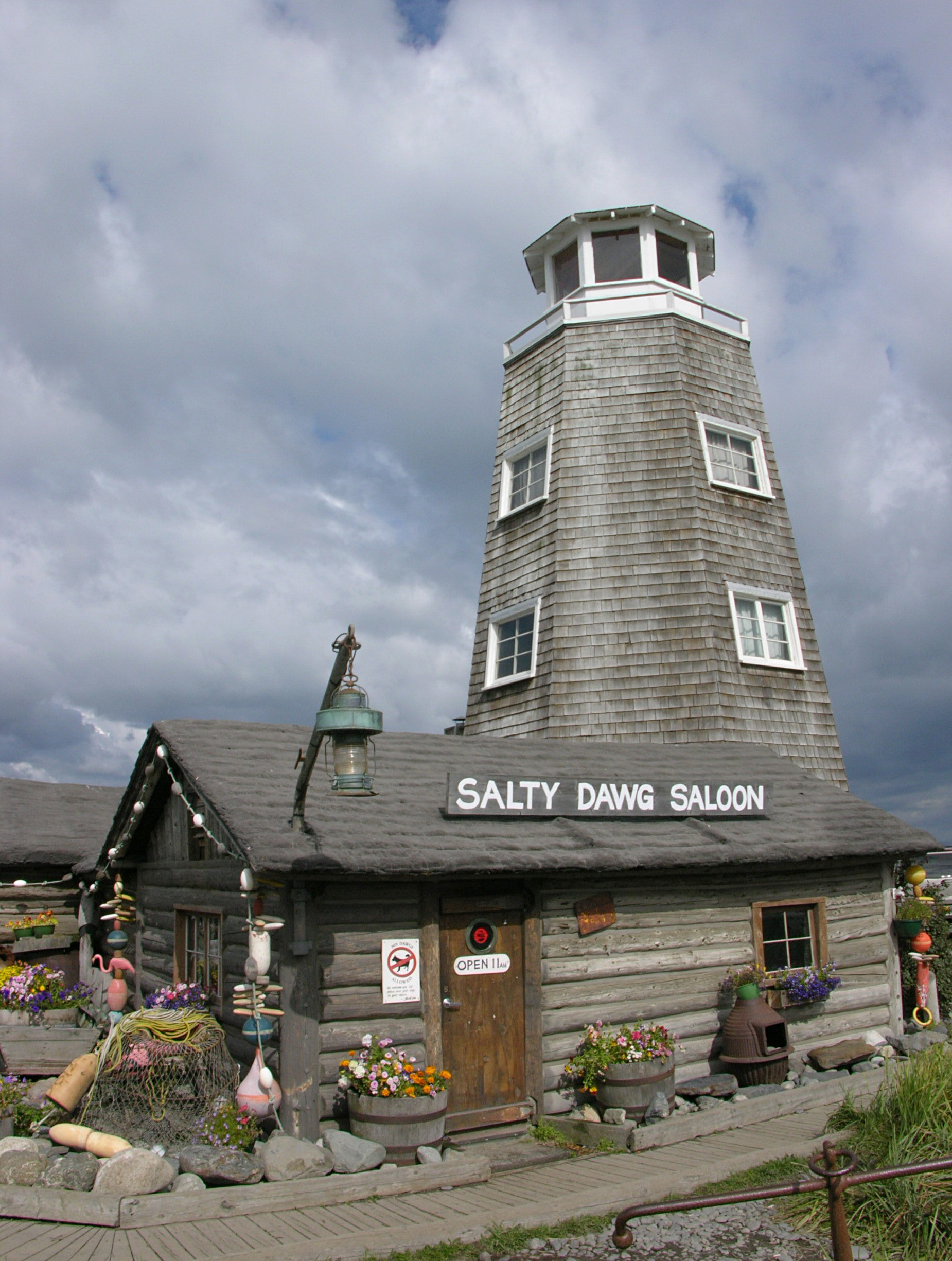
The Salty Dawg Saloon in Homer, Alaska. Built in 1897.

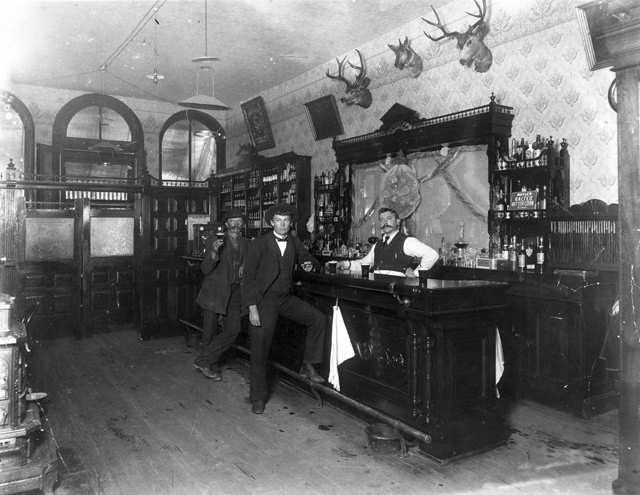
Interior of the Toll Gate Saloon in 1897 Black Hawk, Colorado

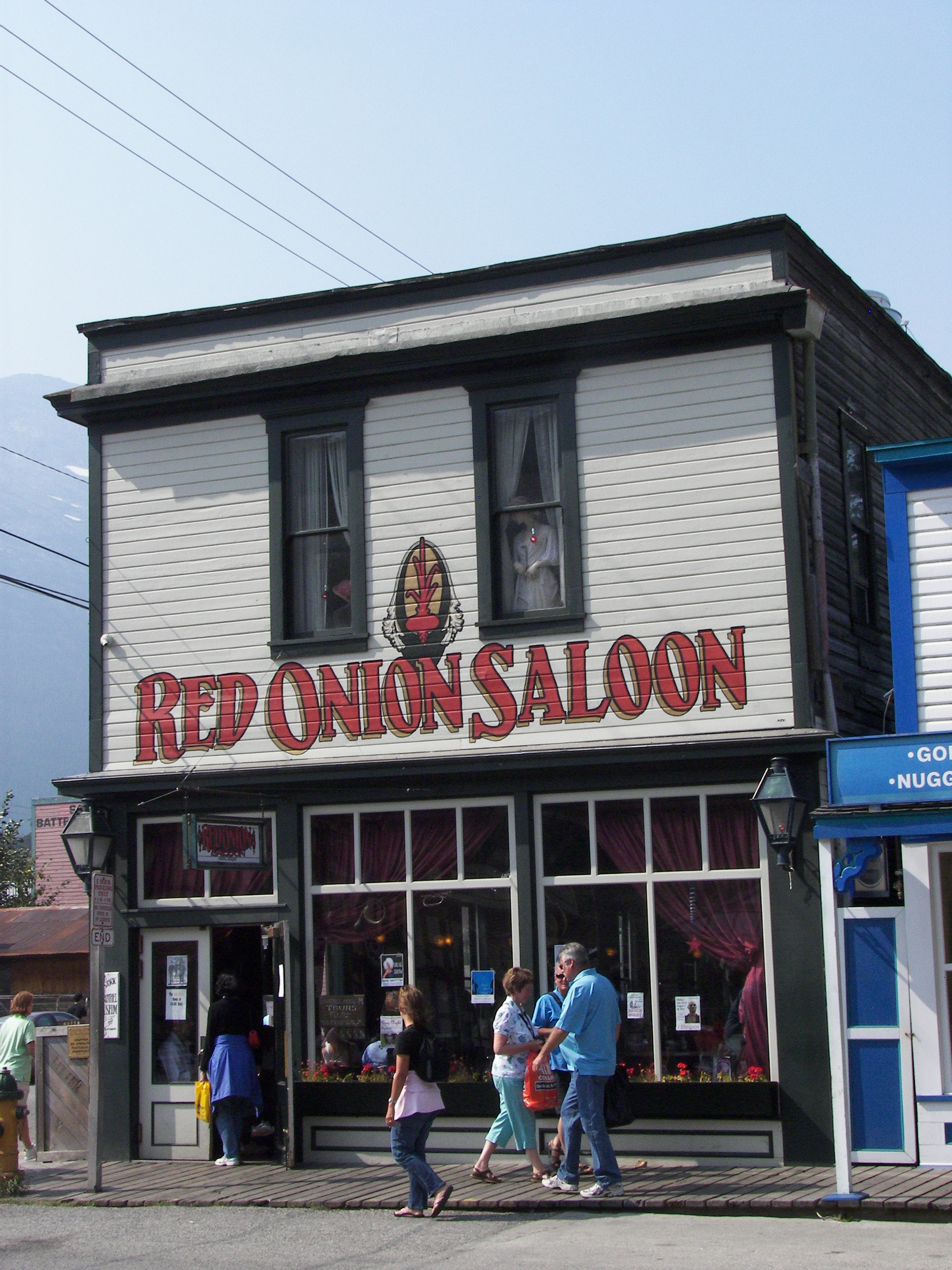
The Red Onion Saloon in Skagway, Alaska. Built in 1898.

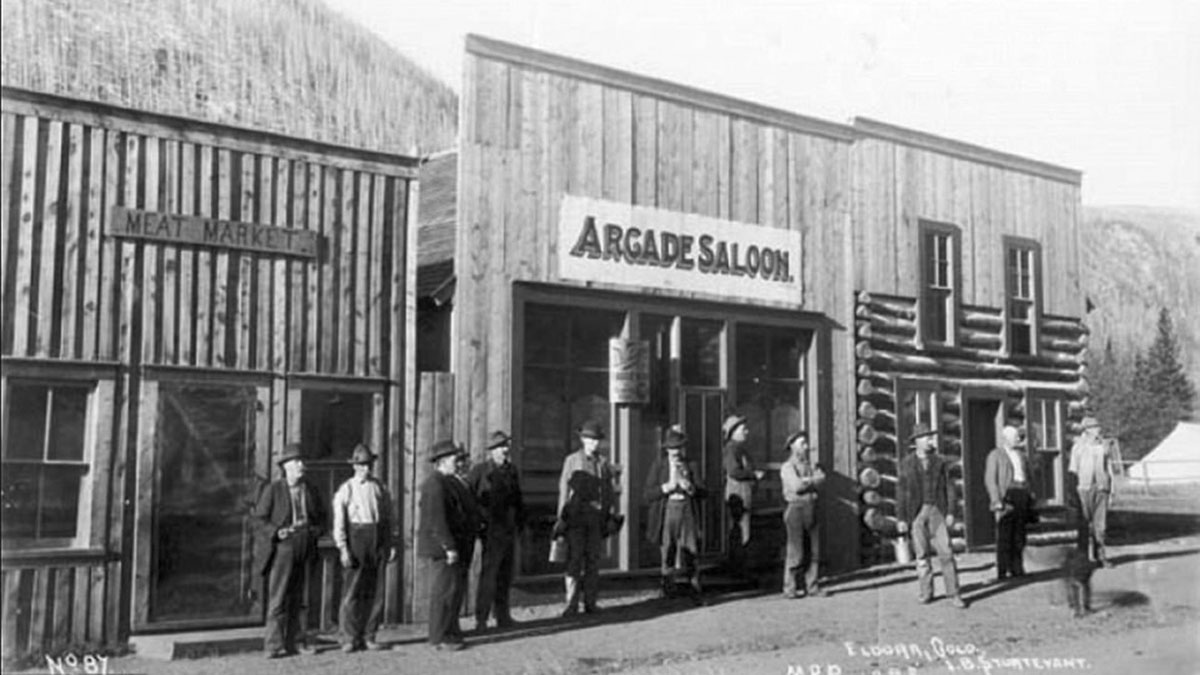
The Arcade Saloon in 1898 Eldora, Colorado

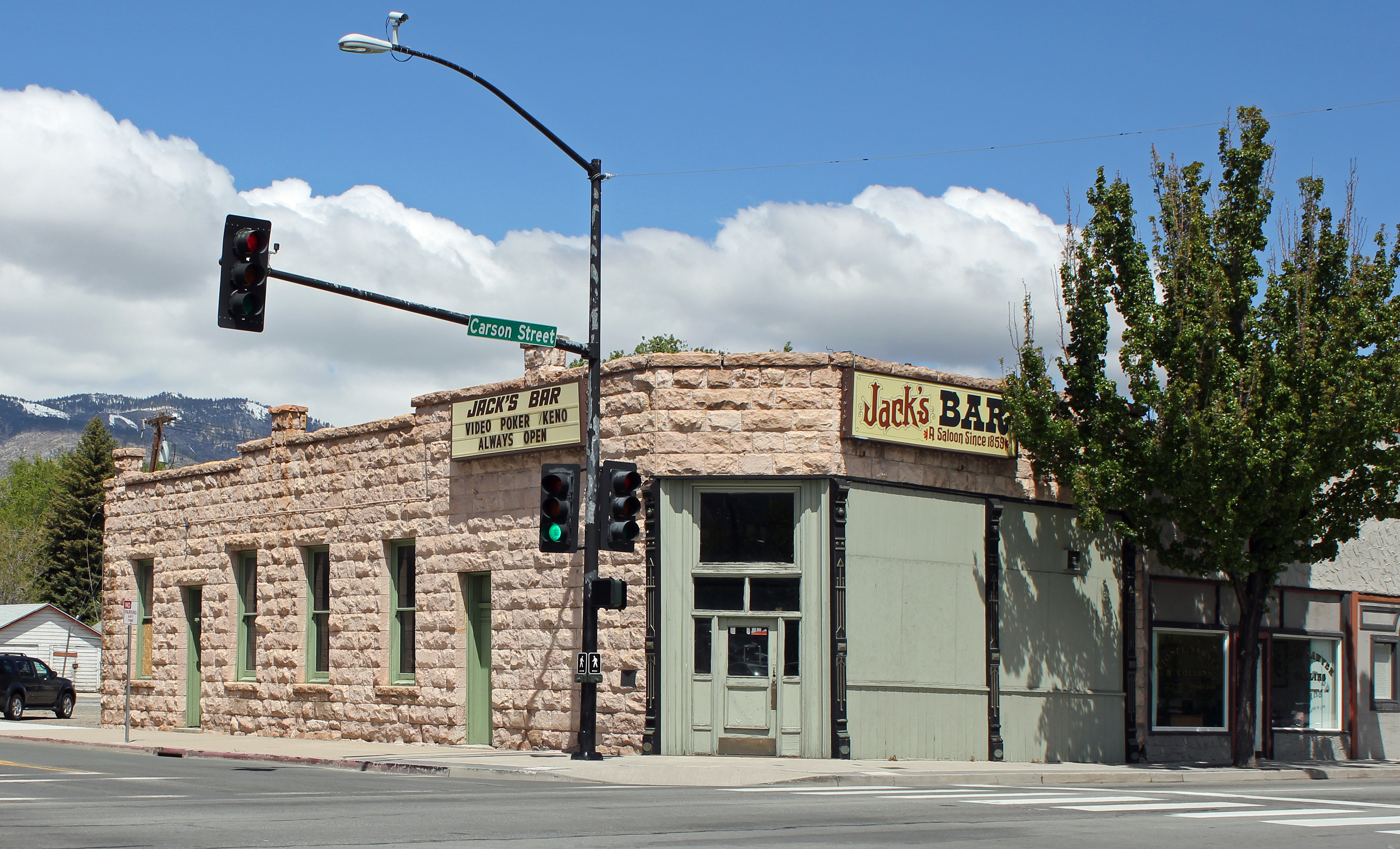
Jack's Bar, formerly the Bank Saloon, in Carson City, Nevada. Built in 1899.

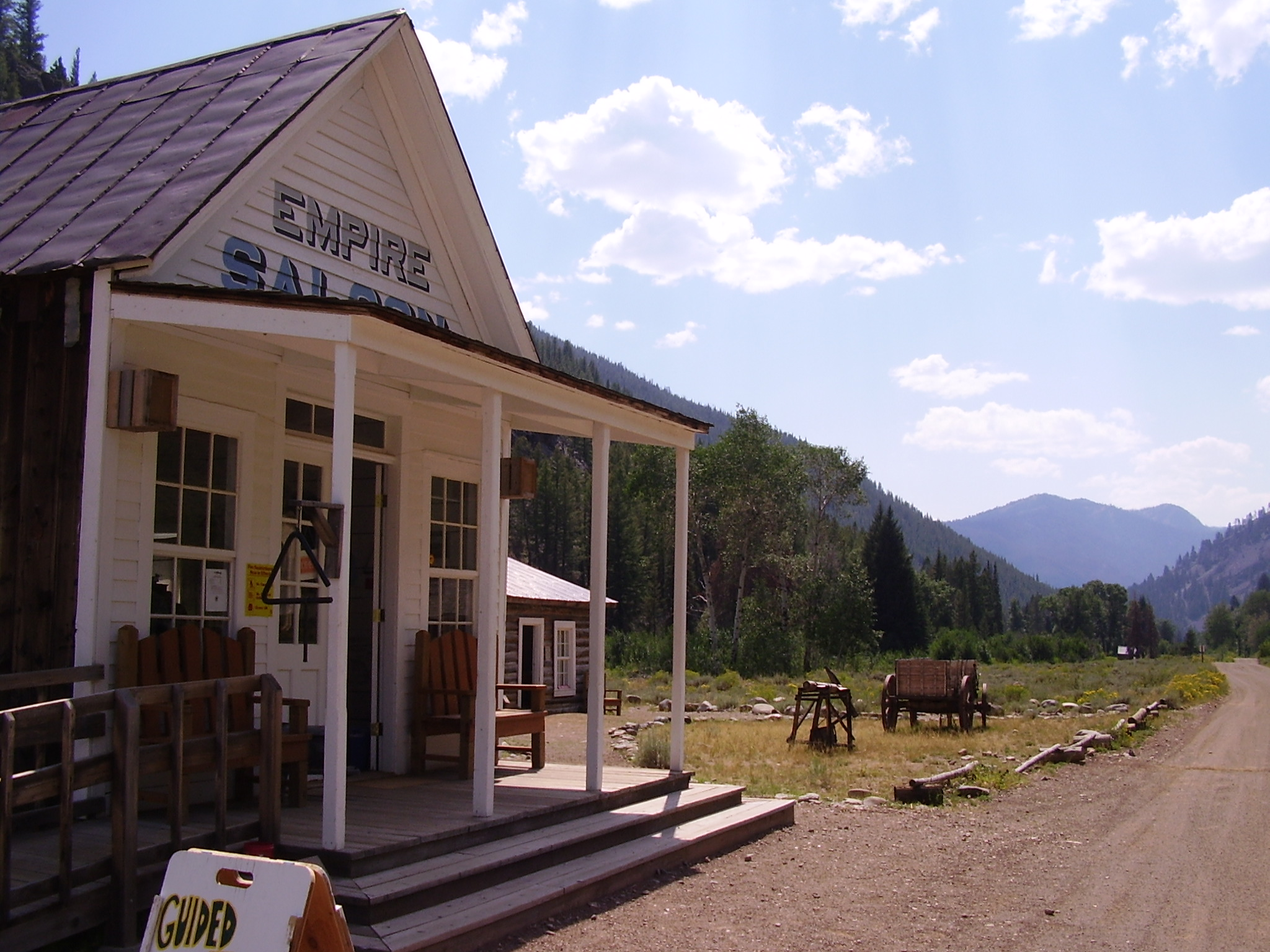
The Empire Saloon in Custer, Idaho. Built in c.1900.

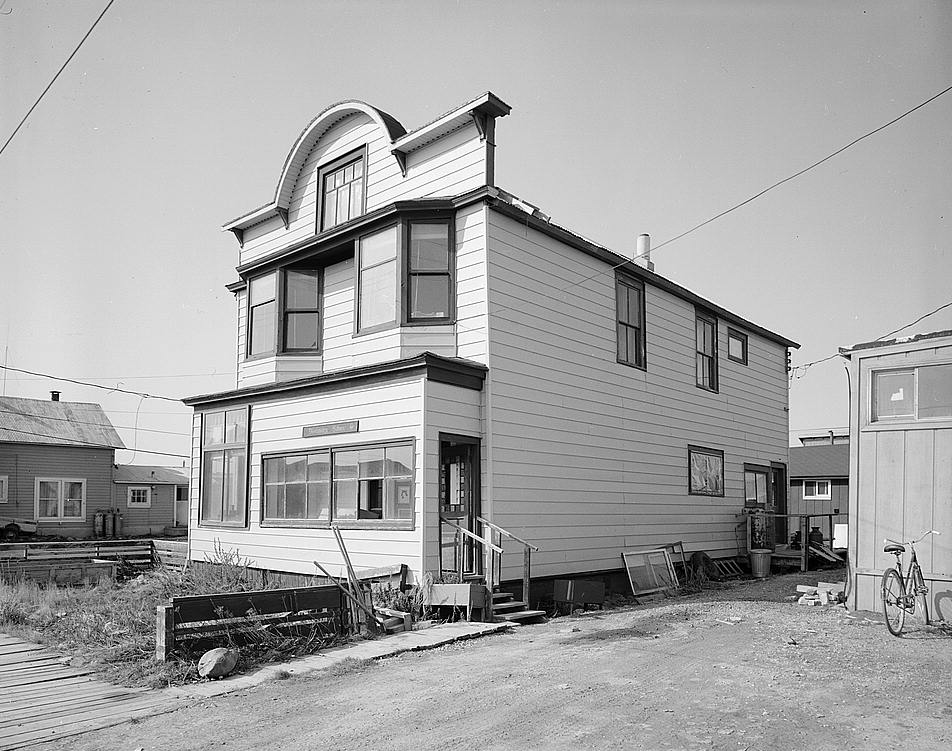
The Discovery Saloon in Nome, Alaska. Built in 1901.

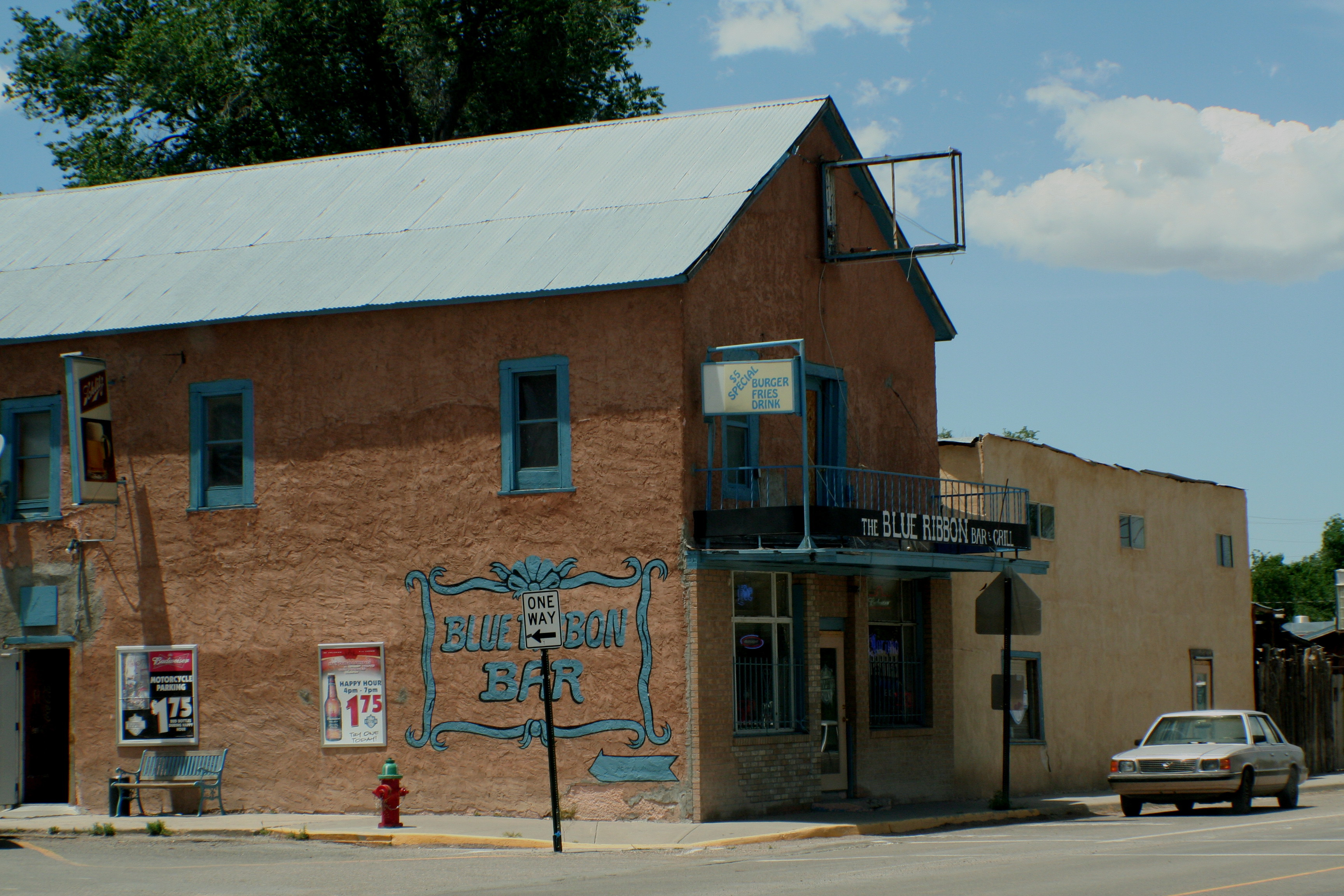
The Blue Ribbon Bar & Grill, formerly the Estancia Saloon, in Estancia, New Mexico. Built in 1903.

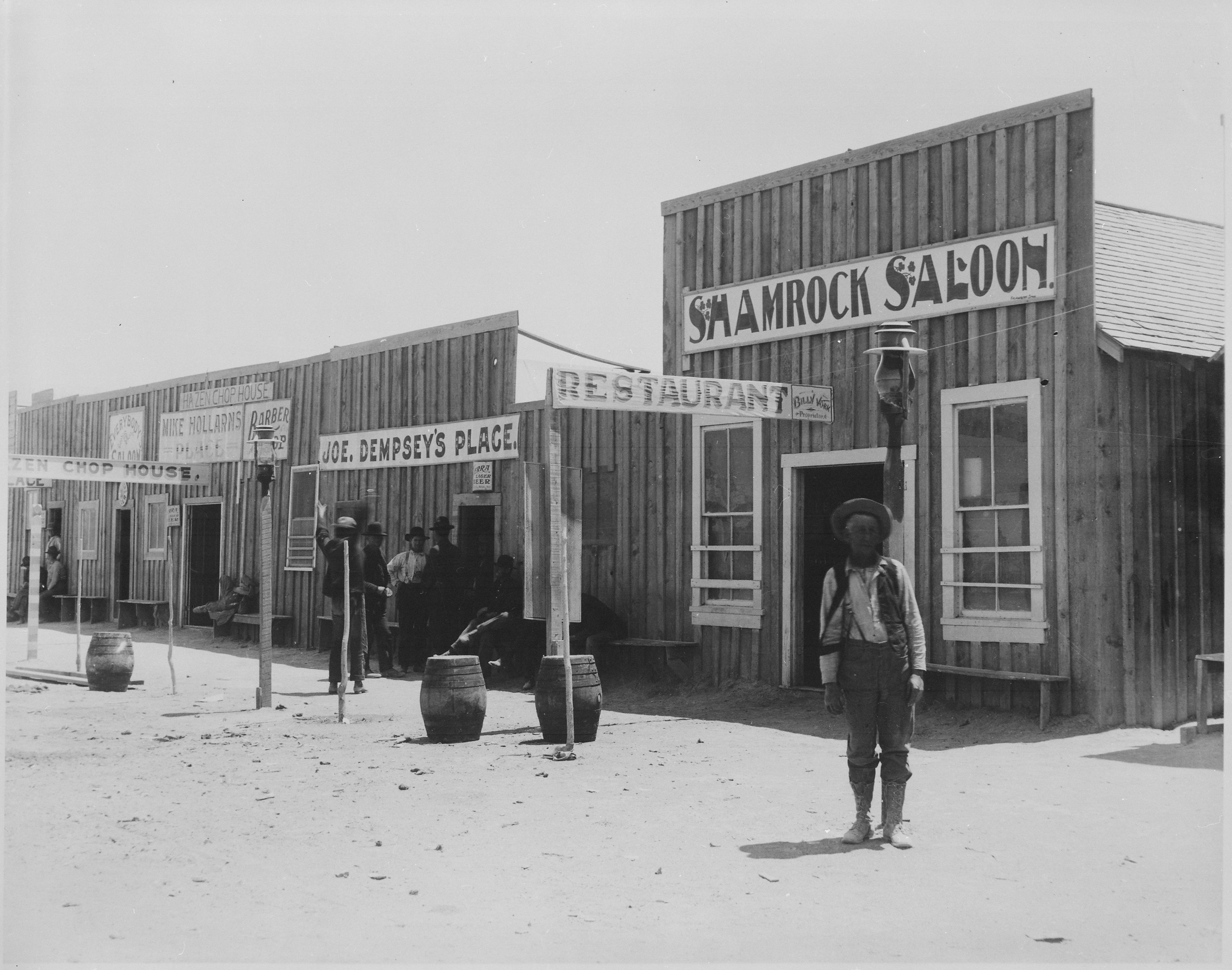
The Shamrock Saloon in 1905 Hazen, Nevada

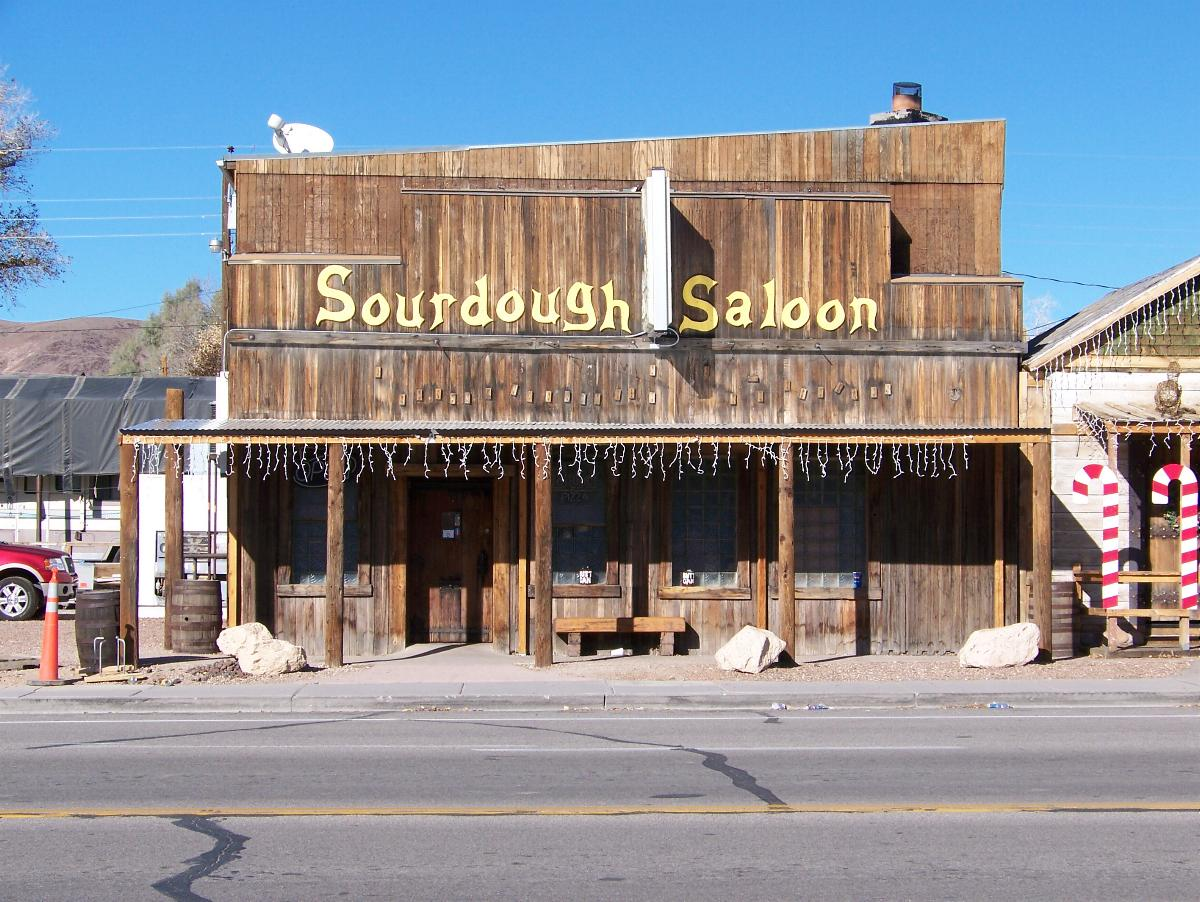
The Sourdough Saloon in Beatty, Nevada. Built in c.1905.

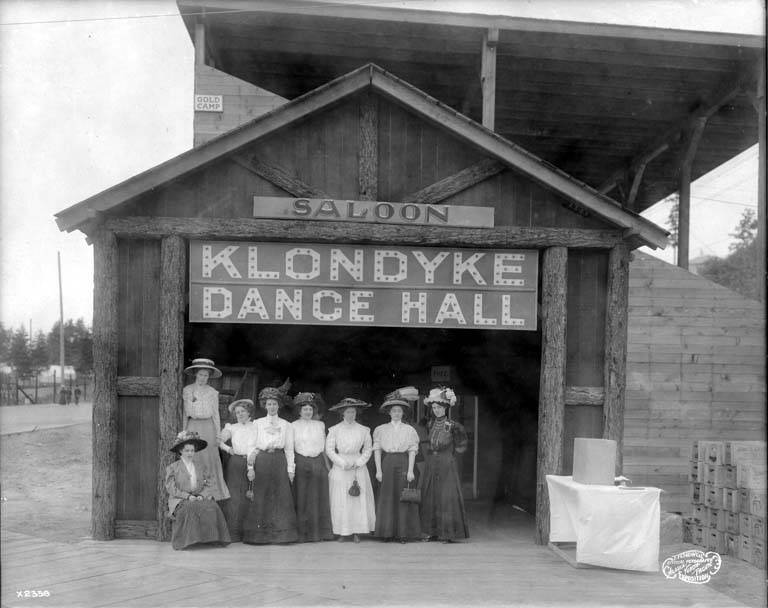
The Klondyke Dance Hall & Saloon in 1909 Seattle, Washington

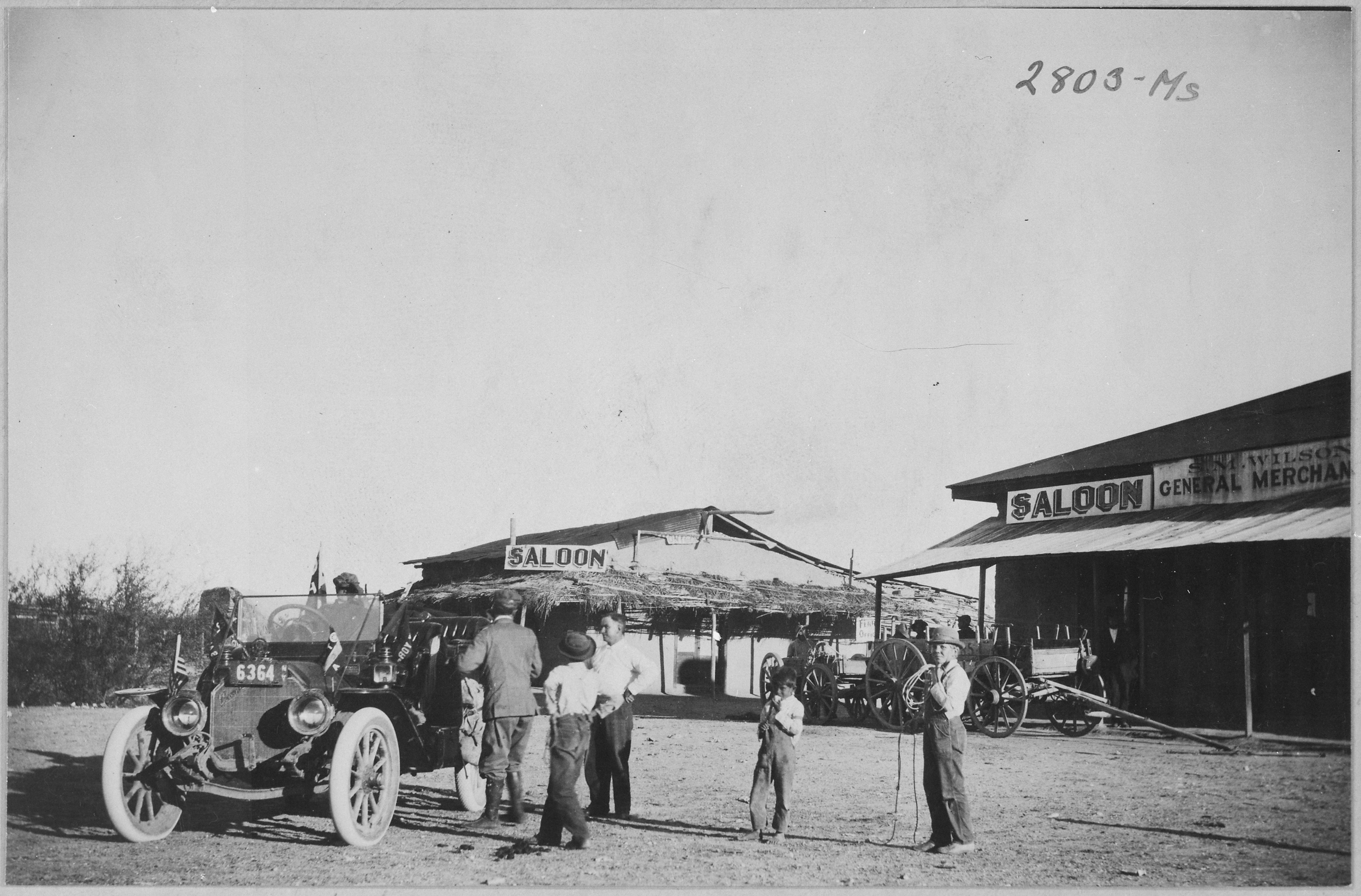
Saloon at Ehrenberg, Arizona, in 1911

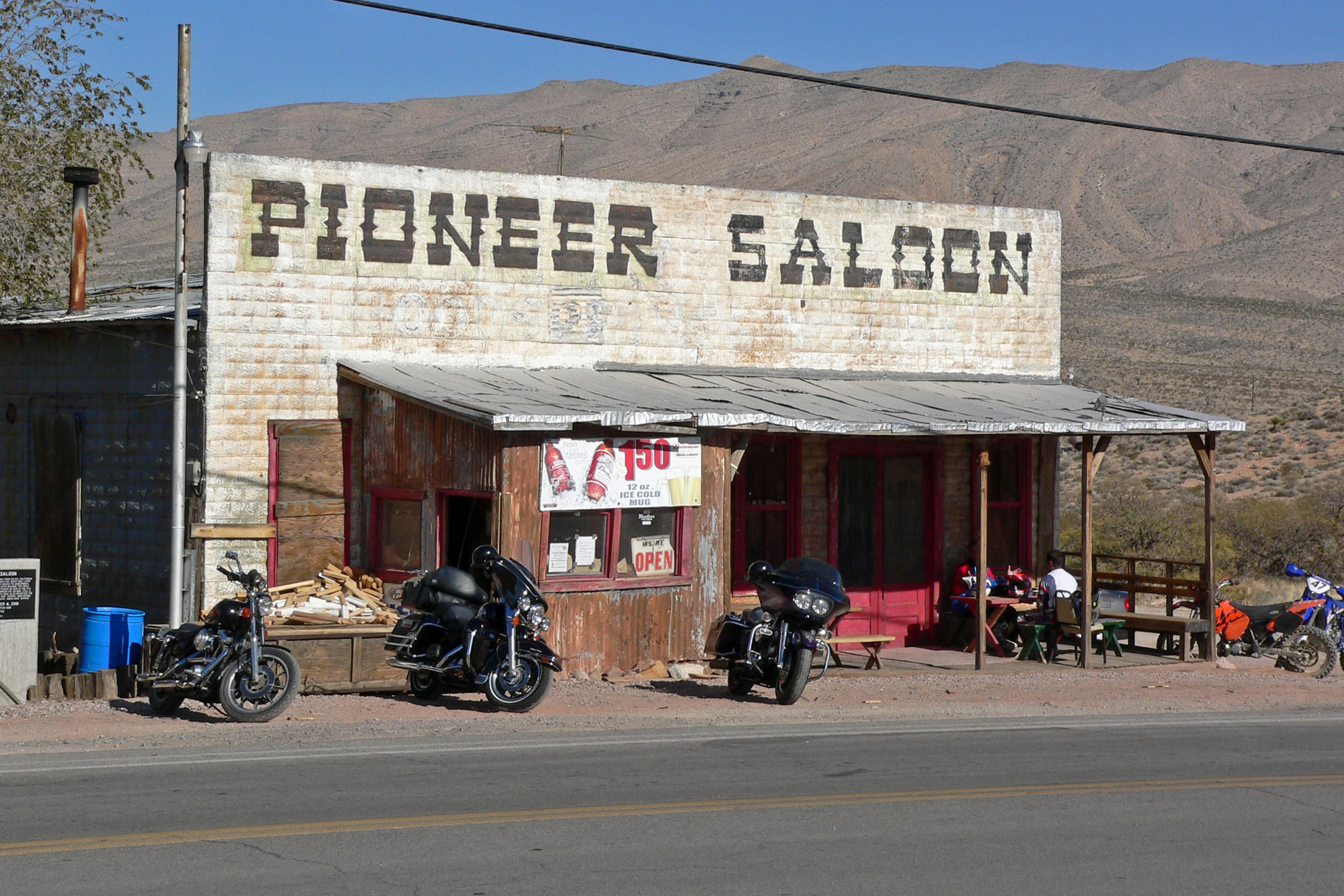
The Pioneer Saloon in Goodsprings, Nevada. Built in 1913.

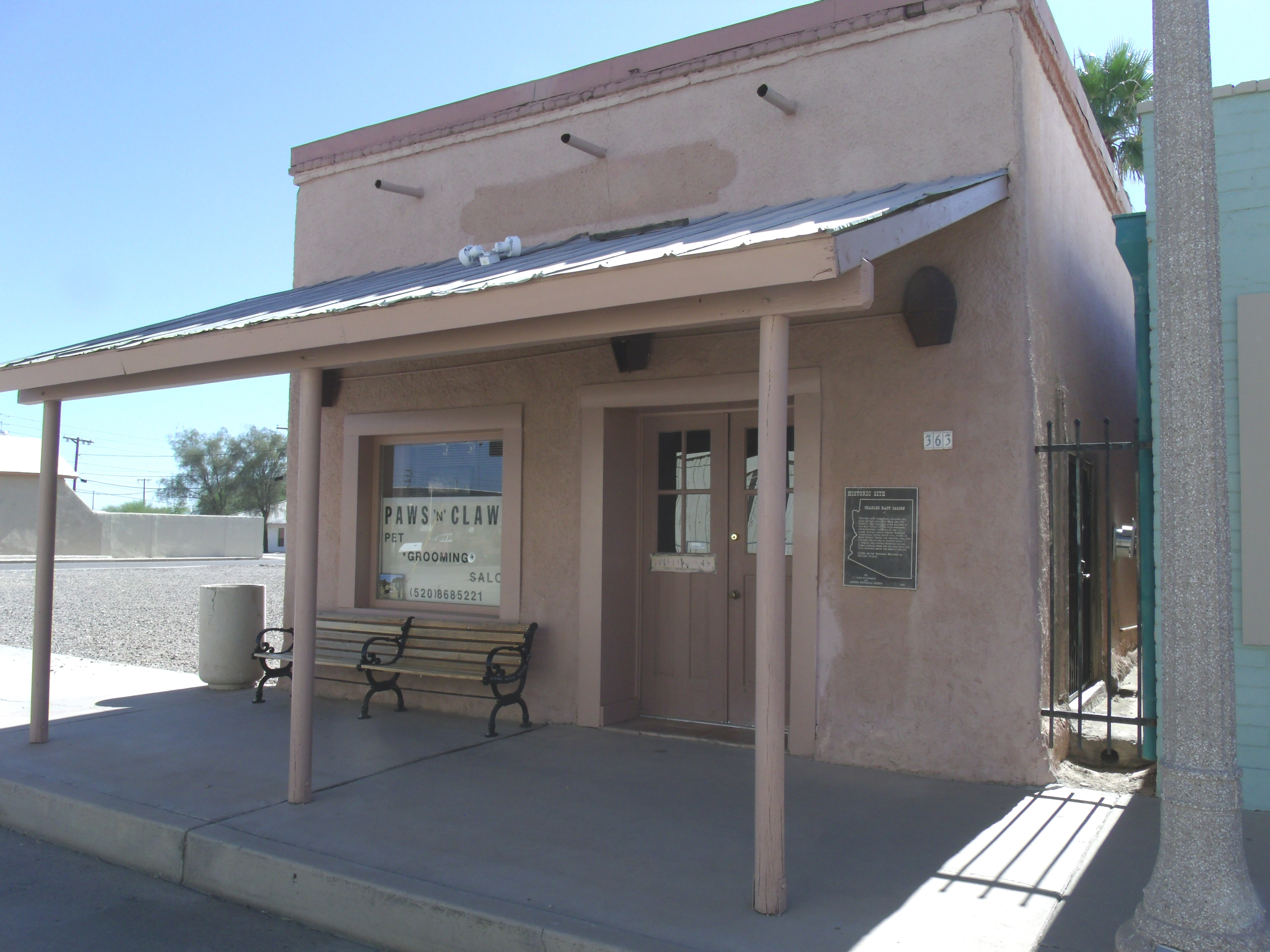
The Charles Rapp Saloon Building in Florence, Arizona. Built in 1875.

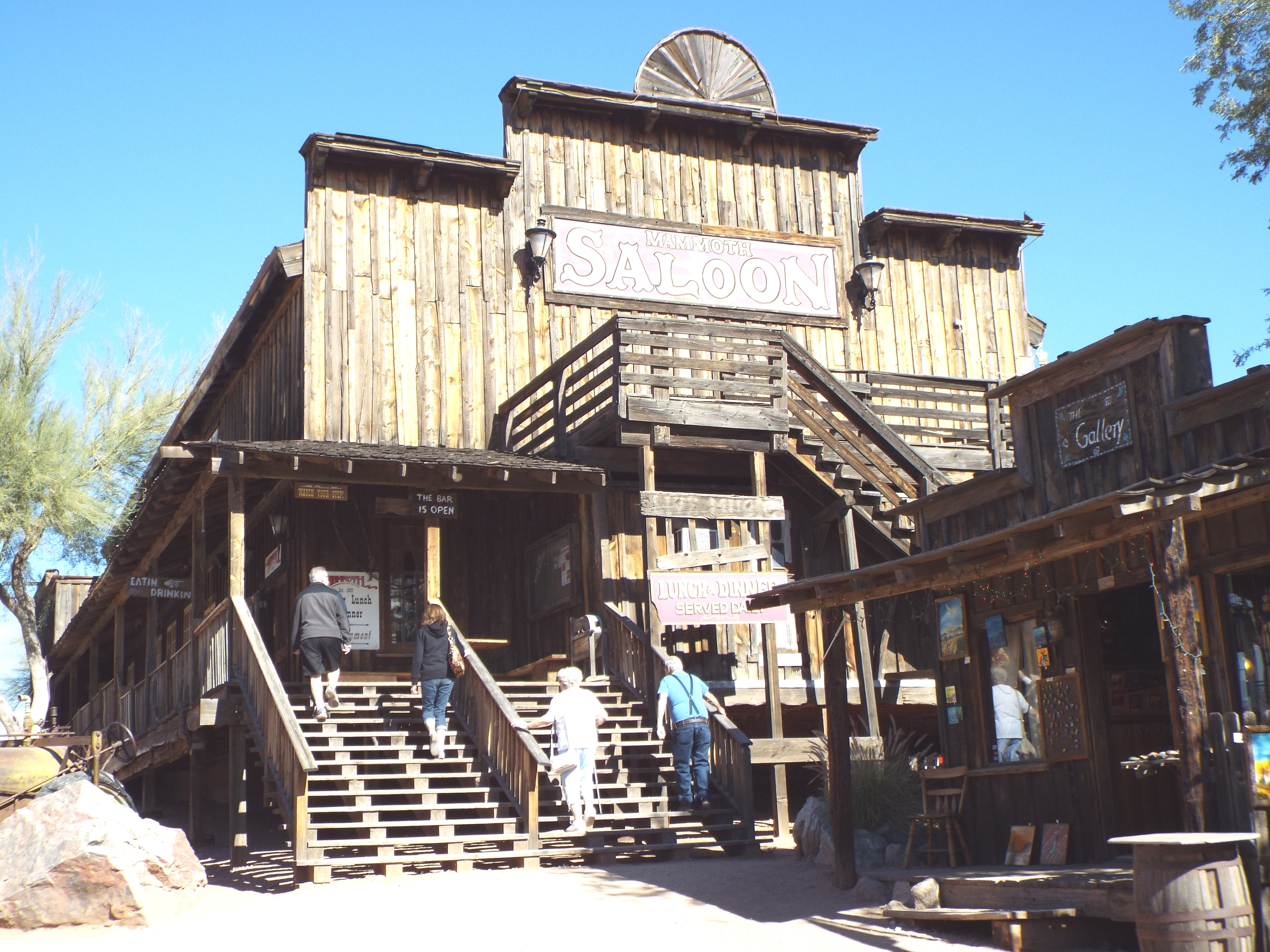
The Mammoth Steak House and Saloon in Goldfield, Arizona. Built in 1893.

== See also ==
- Cantina
- Anti-Saloon League
- List of public house topics
- Stonewall Saloon (Texas)
