= Red Dog Saloon =

Drinking establishment in Alaska, United States

Coordinates: 58.299°N 134.404°W

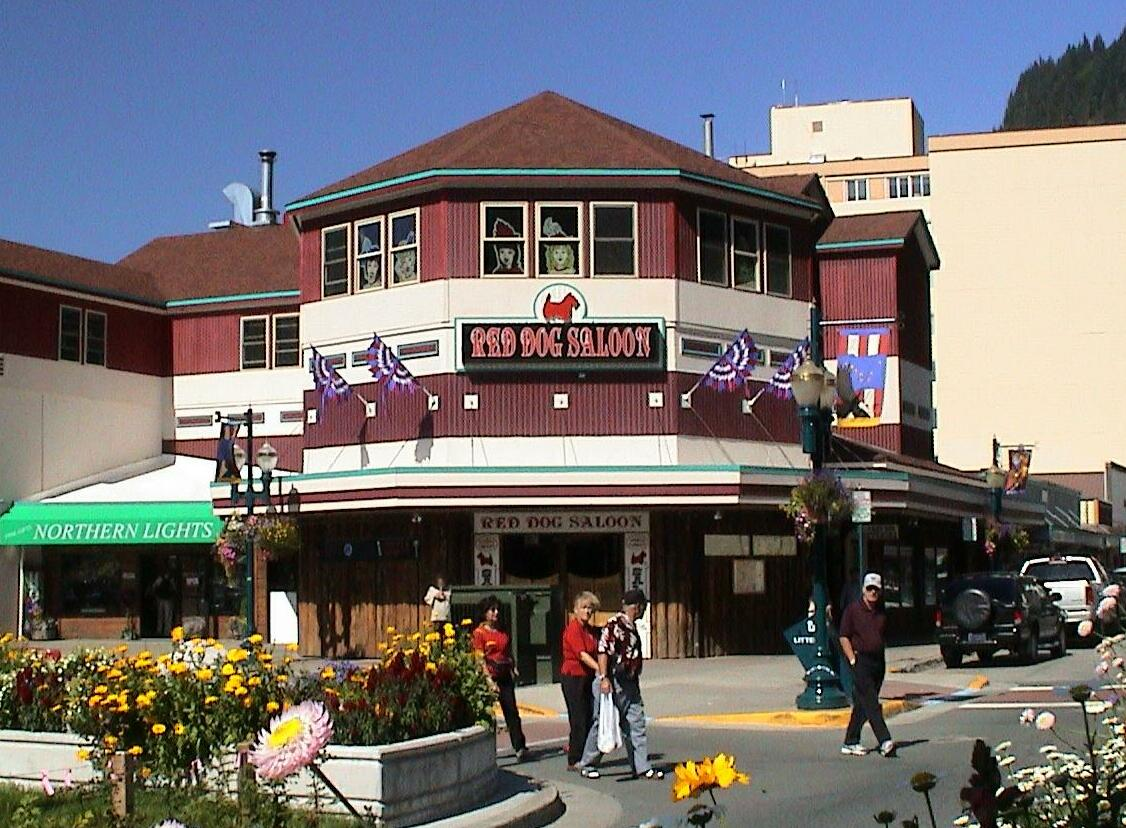
The Red Dog Saloon

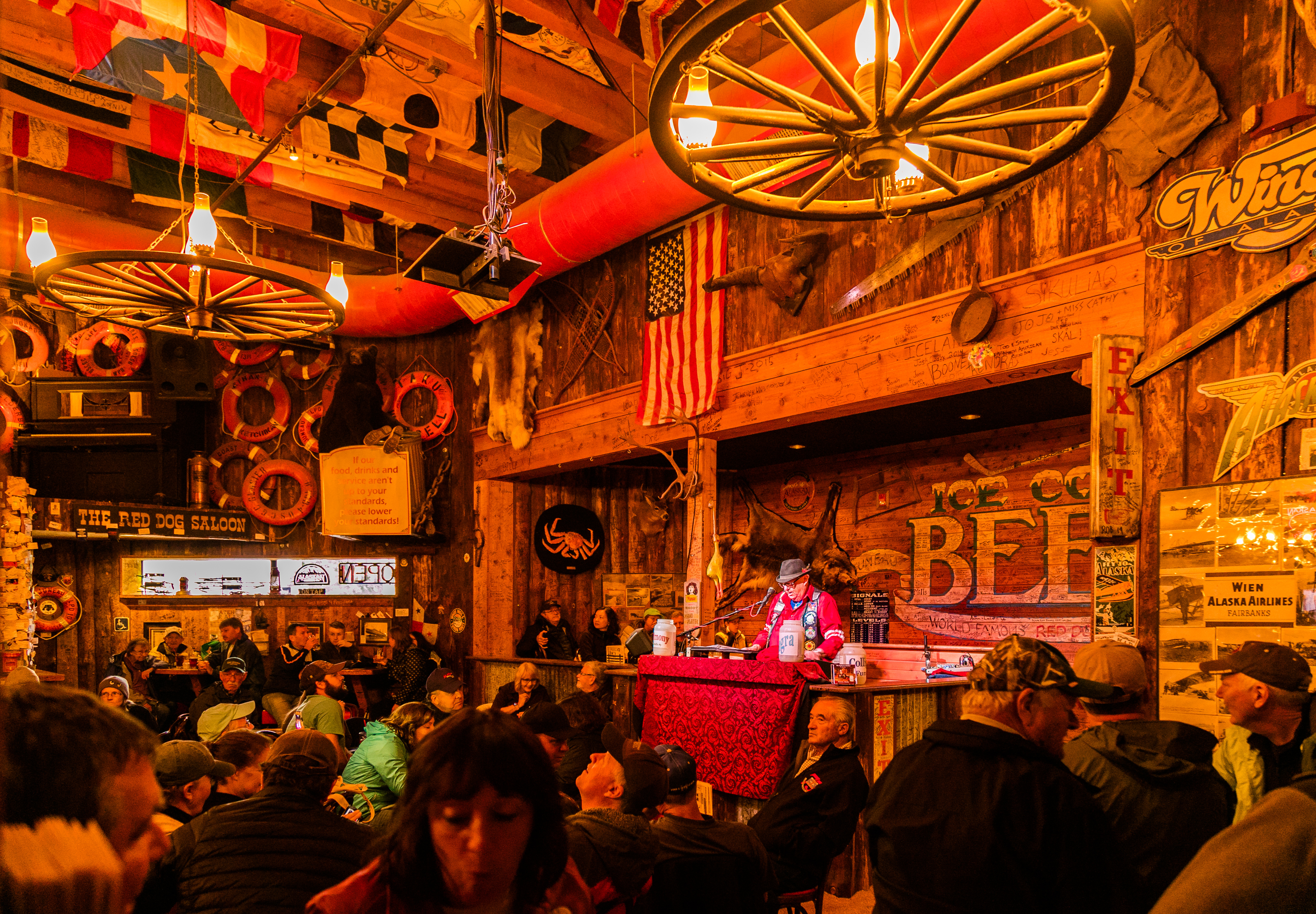
View of the interior.

The Red Dog Saloon is a drinking establishment at 278 South Franklin Street in Juneau, Alaska, U.S. The Red Dog has been recognized by the Alaska Legislature for its longevity as the oldest man-made tourist attraction in Juneau.

== History ==
Founded during Juneau's mining era, the Saloon has been in operation for decades. For a time, "Ragtime Hattie" played the piano in white gloves and a silver dollar halter top. Later, in territorial days, the owners would often meet the tour boats at the docks with a mule that wore a sign saying, "follow my ass to the Red Dog Saloon."

The saloon hosted an episode of The Ed Sullivan Show just after Alaska became a state.

== Memorabilia displayed ==
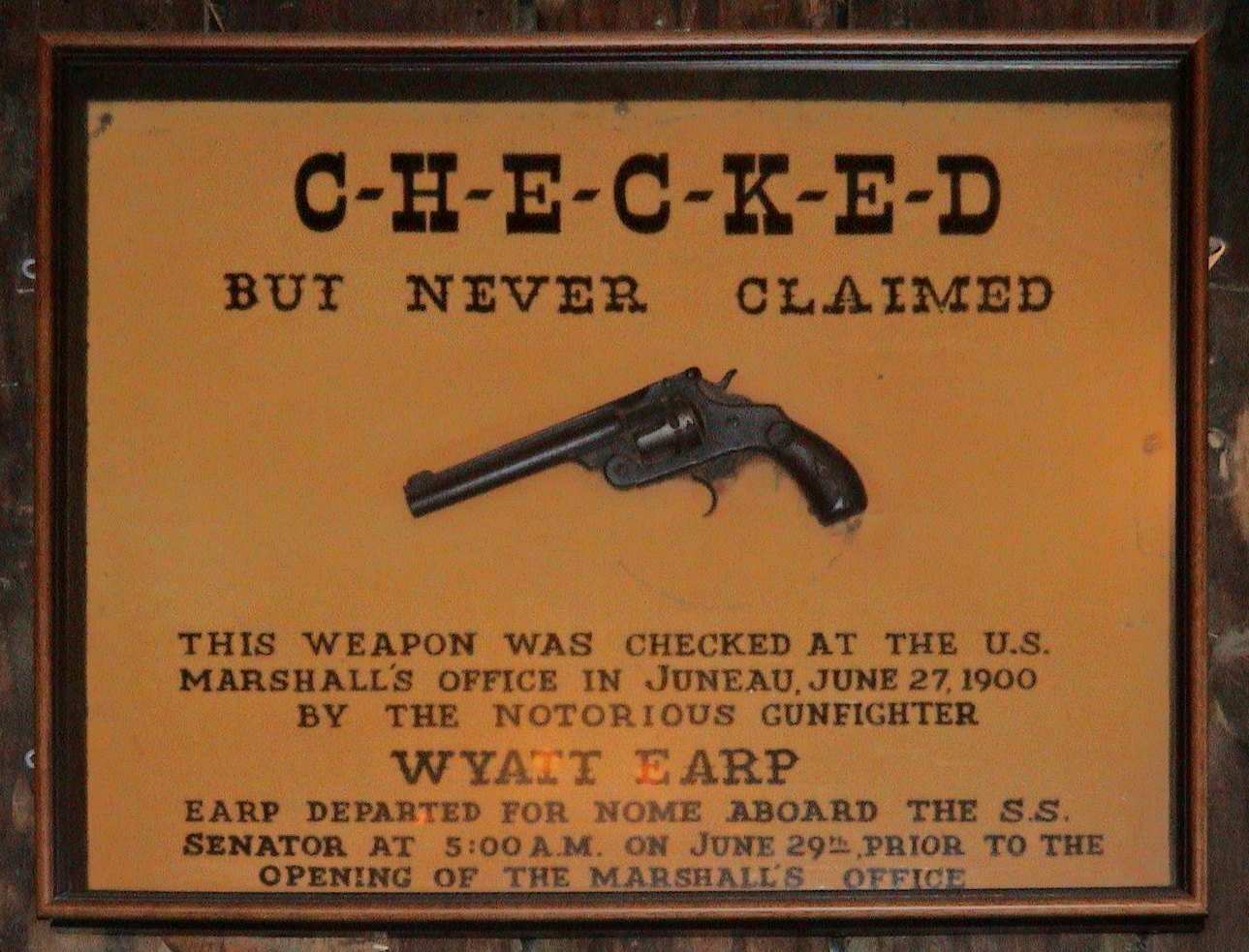
Wyatt Earp's pistol at the Red Dog Saloon

- Wyatt Earp's gun that he checked but failed to claim on his way to Nome
- a walrus oosik
- trophy wildlife mounts
- paper currency signed by miners from around the world throughout the years

Established by Earl and Thelma Forsythe
