= Damsel in Distress =

The damsel in distress is a theme in world art, entertainment, and media, in which a beautiful woman must be rescued by a hero usually a man.

Damsel(s) in Distress may also refer to:

- A Damsel in Distress (novel), a 1919 novel by P. G. Wodehouse
  - A Damsel in Distress (1919 film), a silent romantic comedy film based on the novel
  - A Damsel in Distress (1937 film), a Hollywood musical film based on the novel
  - A Damsel in Distress (musical), a 2015 musical based on the novel
- Damsels in Distress (plays), a 2001 trilogy of plays by Alan Ayckbourn
- Damsels in Distress (film), a 2011 film by Whit Stillman
- "Damsel in Distress", a 2014 song by Neck Deep from Wishful Thinking
- Damsel in Distress (song), a 2020 song by Rufus Wainwright

== See also ==
- or
- or
- or
- Endangered Girls (disambiguation)
- Girl in Danger (disambiguation)
- Dangerous Girl (disambiguation)
- Danger Girl
- Distress (disambiguation)
- Damsel (disambiguation)
