= Danger Girl (disambiguation) =

Danger Girl is a comic book published by IDW and Image Comics.

Danger Girl or The Danger Girl may also refer to:

== Fictional characters ==
- Danger Girl, a character from the 1988 film Paramedics
- Danger Girl, also called "Z", a spy in the British Secret Service, from the British comic book Bunty

== Film ==
- The Danger Girl (1916 film), a 1916 American silent comedy film
- The Danger Girl (1926 film), a 1926 American silent drama film
- Danger Girl, a 1960s British short film by Harrison Marks
- Danger Girl, a future film based on the eponymous comic book Danger Girl

== Music ==
- "Danger Girl", a 2012 single by C-REAL
- "Dangergirl", a 2000 song by Tinfed off the album Tried + True

== Other uses ==
- Danger Girl (video game), a 2000 videogame based on the eponymous comic book Danger Girl
- Danger Girl, an unproduced but cancelled TV show based on the eponymous comic book Danger Girl

== See also ==
- Girl in Danger (disambiguation)
- Endangered Girls (disambiguation)
- Dangerous Girl (disambiguation)
- Danger (disambiguation)
- Girl (disambiguation)
