= Girl in Danger (disambiguation) =

Girl in Danger is a 1934 American crime film.

Girl in Danger may also refer to:

- Girl in Danger, a 1962 Hong Kong film
- "Girl in Danger", a 1966 episode of the TV show The Disordered Mind

== See also ==
- White Girl in Danger (stageplay), a 2023 satirical musical by Michael R. Jackson
- Damsel in Distress (disambiguation)
- Endangered Girls (disambiguation)
- Dangerous Girl (disambiguation)
- Danger Girl (disambiguation)
- Danger (disambiguation)
- Girl (disambiguation)
