= Teddy at the Throttle =

1917 film by Clarence G. Badger

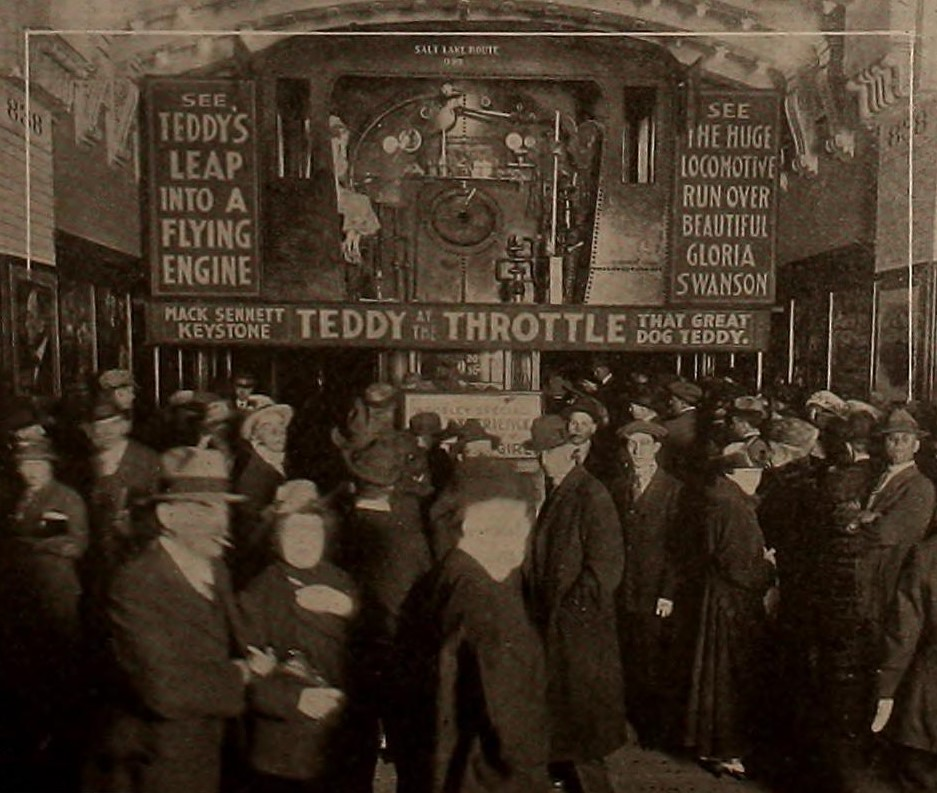
- A theater advertising Teddy at the Throttle
- Directed by: Clarence G. Badger
- Produced by: Mack Sennett
- Starring: Bobby Vernon; Gloria Swanson; Wallace Beery; Teddy the Dog
- Production company: Keystone Studios
- Distributed by: Triangle Film Corporation
- Release date: April 15, 1917
- Running time: 24 minutes; 2 reels
- Country: United States
- Language: Silent (English intertitles)

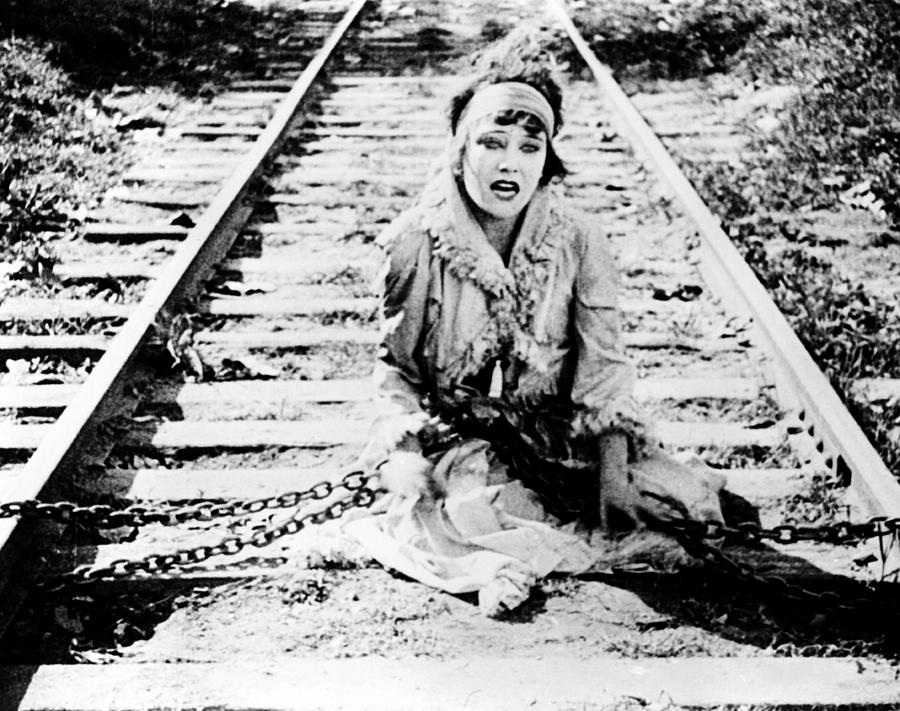
Gloria Swanson in Teddy at the Throttle

Teddy at the Throttle

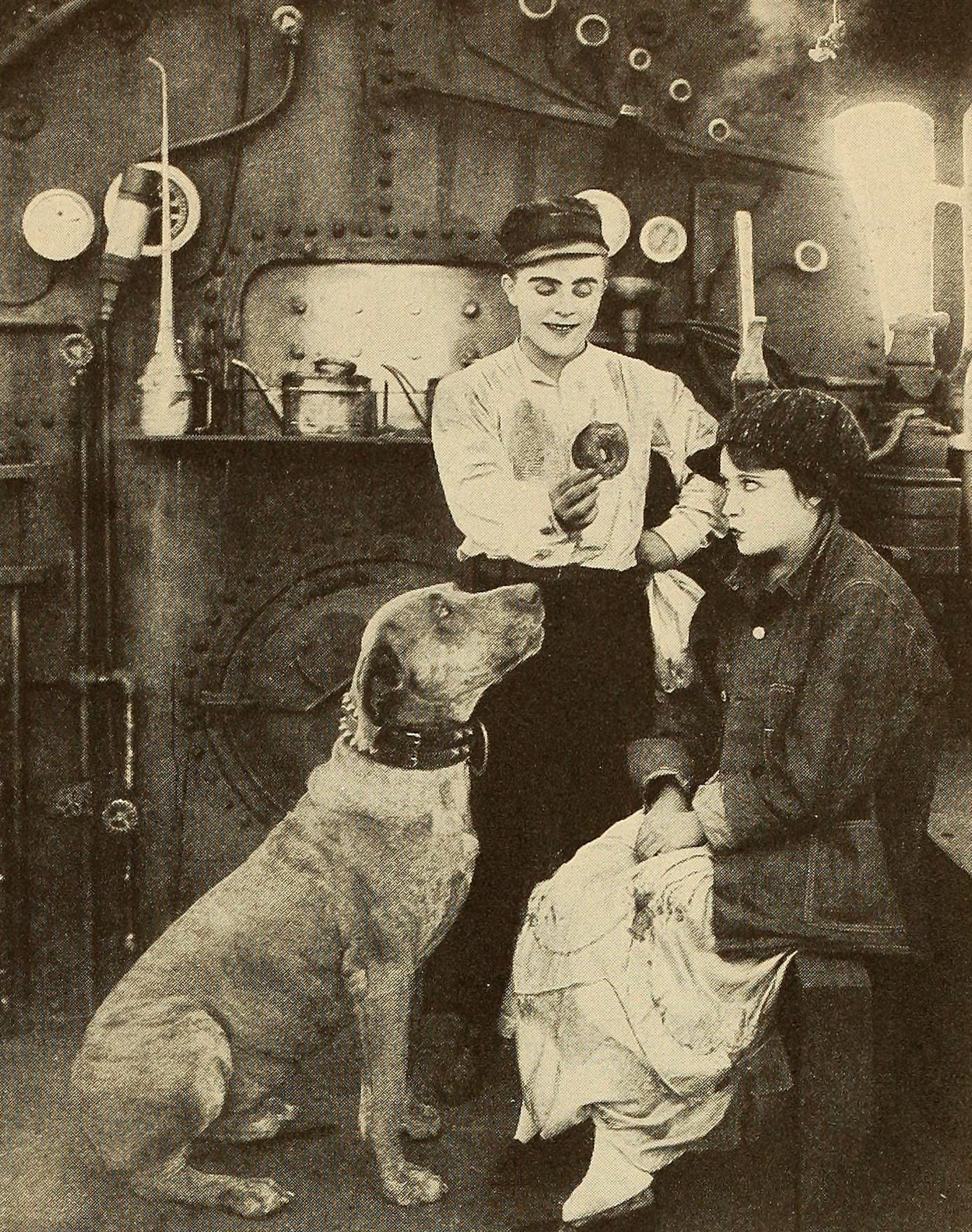
Vernon with Gloria Swanson and Teddy the Dog in Teddy at the Throttle

Teddy at the Throttle is a 1917 American silent comedy short film starring Bobby Vernon, Gloria Swanson, and Wallace Beery. Wallace Beery and Gloria Swanson were briefly husband and wife during this period.

== Cast ==
- Bobby Vernon as Bobbie Knight
- Gloria Swanson as Gloria Dawn
- Wallace Beery as Henry Black
- May Emory as The Guardian's Sister
- Blanche Phillips as The Boy's Mercenary Aunt
- Teddy the Dog as Teddy
- Roxana McGowan

== Production ==
Wallace Beery and Gloria Swanson had been married two months before Teddy at the Throttle was produced. According to Swanson's autobiography, Beery raped her on their wedding night and in the week before filming occurred, Beery had secretly dosed Swanson with an abortifacient, which caused their separation. Clarence Badger approached Swanson about her being cast for the film along with Beery, she accepted, avoiding Beery as much as possible.

For the scene where Gloria Dawn is snatched up by Henry Black and tied to the train tracks, Beery was overly aggressive with Swanson, and said she was not acting when she kicked and struggled.

Initially, a stunt man was going to substitute for Swanson when her character dove into a hole she dug under the tracks, just as the train passed over, but Swanson insisted on doing the stunt herself.

The train scenes were shot on location in San Bernardino.

== Preservation ==
35 mm copies are held by George Eastman Museum, Blackhawk Films, and in the private collection of Richard M. Roberts.
