= Teddy (dog) =

20th-century dog actor

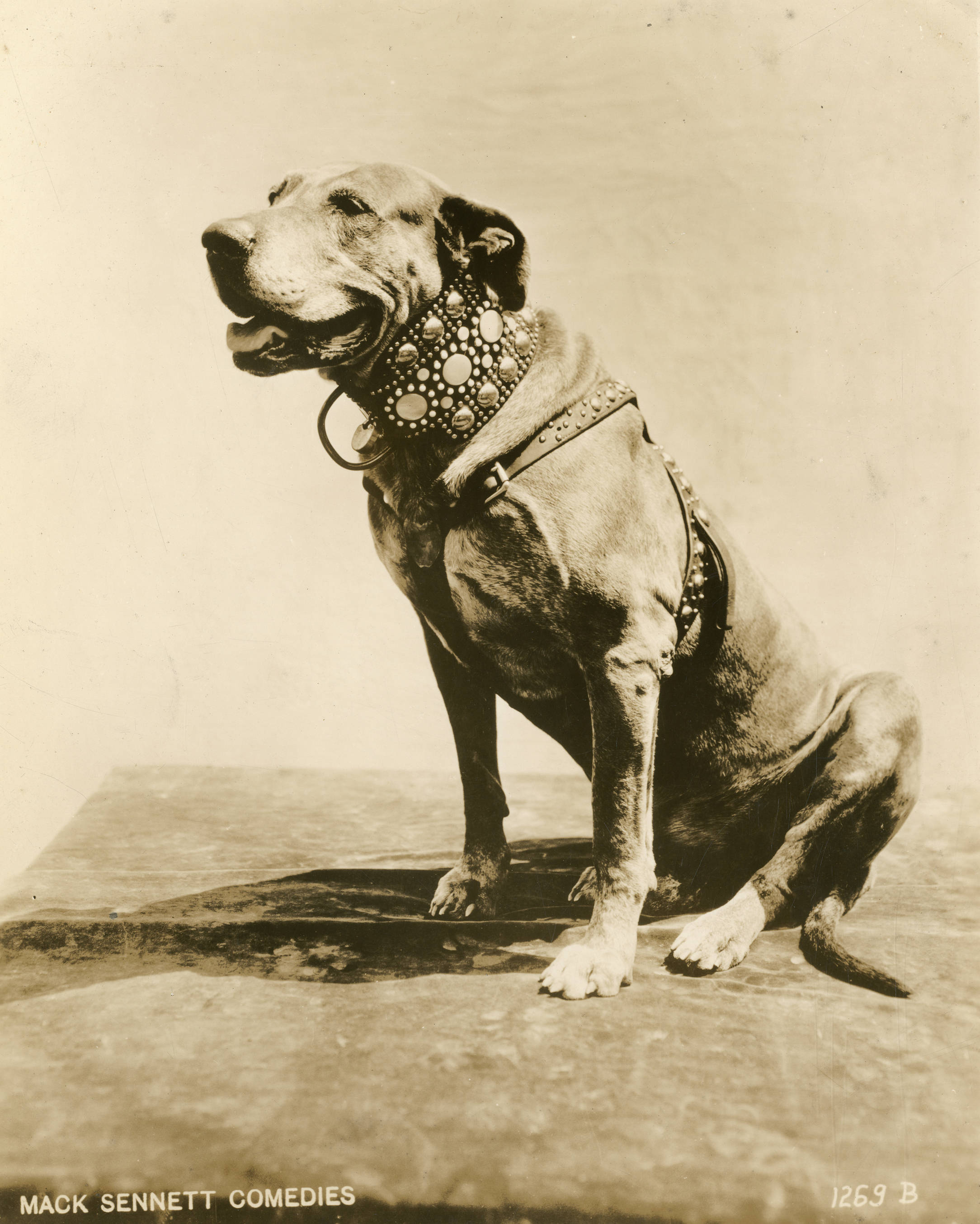
- Teddy in 1922
- Species: Canis familiaris
- Breed: Great Dane
- Sex: Male
- Born: 1910 or 1911
- Died: May 17, 1925
- Occupation: Actor
- Employer: Mack Sennett
- Years active: 1915–1924
- Owner: Joseph E. Simkins

Teddy the Dog or Keystone Teddy (1910/11 – May 17, 1925) was the most famous animal actor associated with the Mack Sennett studios. The Great Dane was one of only three (with Mabel Normand and Roscoe Arbuckle) of the studio's stars whose name appeared in the title of a film (Teddy at the Throttle). He performed chiefly in Sennett comedies, but he also appeared in dramatic films including Stella Maris (1918), The Strangers' Banquet (1922) and A Boy of Flanders (1924).

According to film crews and fellow cast members, Teddy behaved on set as professionally as any human actor. He is credited with appearing in at least 60 films, nearly all shorts, between 1915 and 1924.

Owned and trained by Joseph E. Simkins, Teddy weighed 145 pounds (66 kg) and stood 42 inches (110 cm) tall. He died May 17, 1925, aged 14, at Simkins's home in Hollywood.

== Select filmography ==
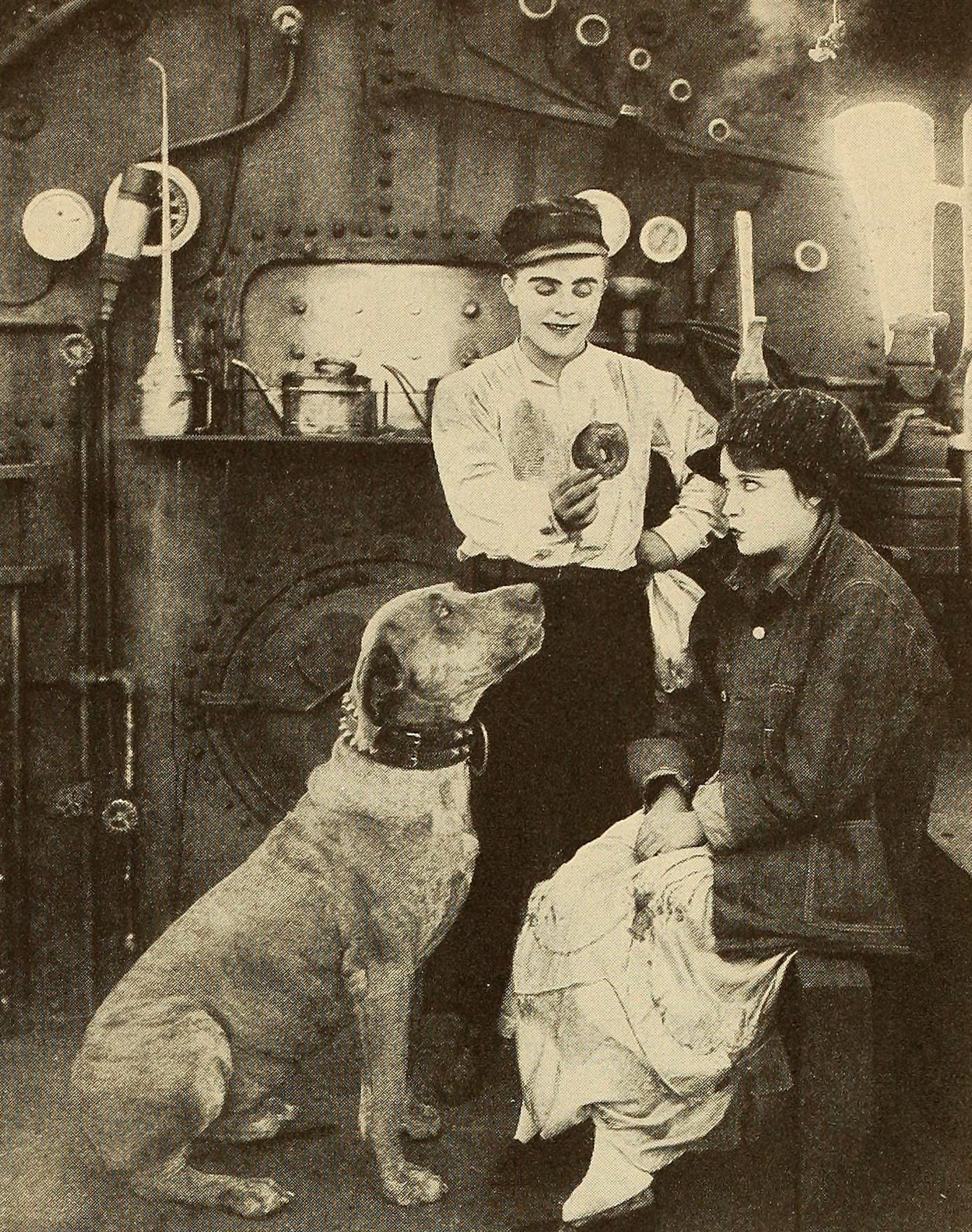
Bobby Vernon, Gloria Swanson and Teddy the Dog in Teddy at the Throttle (1917)

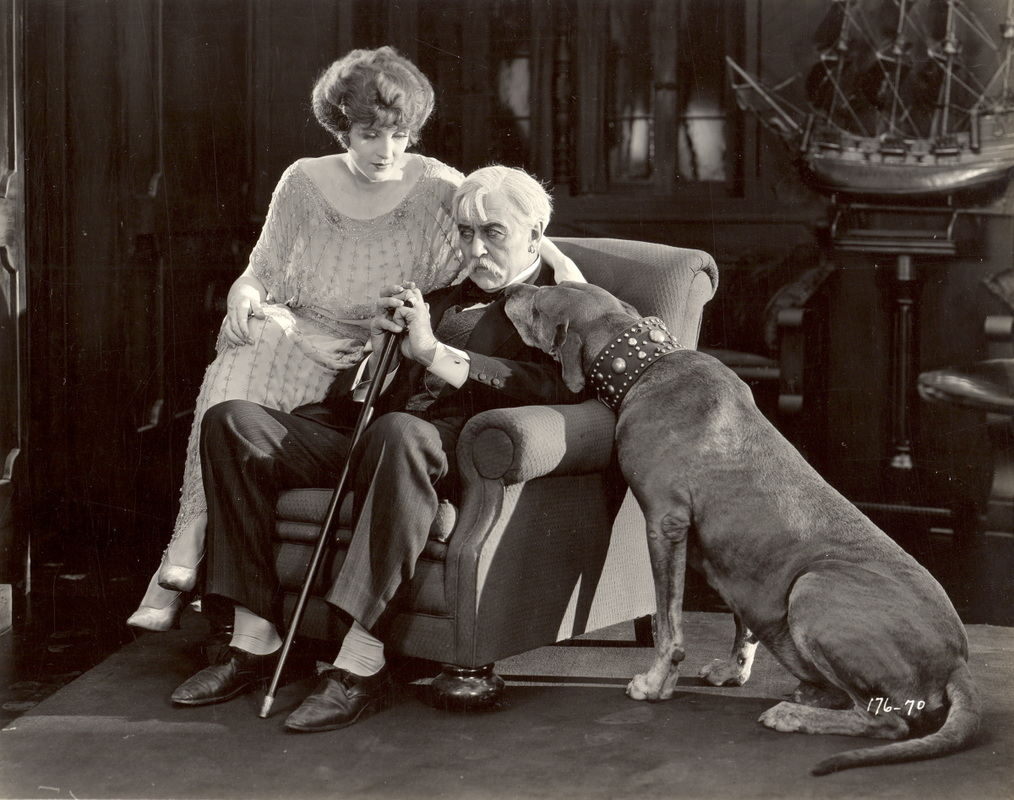
Claire Windsor, Hobart Bosworth and Teddy in Marshall Neilan's The Strangers' Banquet (1922)

| Year | Title | Notes |
|---|---|---|
| 1916 | The Road Agent | |
| 1916 | The Feathered Nest | |
| 1917 | The Nick of Time Baby | |
| 1917 | Teddy at the Throttle | |
| 1917 | The Betrayal of Maggie | |
| 1917 | A Dog Catcher's Love | |
| 1917 | The Sultan's Wife | |
| 1917 | A Bedroom Blunder | |
| 1917 | Roping Her Romeo | |
| 1917 | Are Waitresses Safe? | |
| 1918 | Stella Maris | |
| 1918 | It Pays to Exercise | |
| 1918 | Those Athletic Girls | |
| 1918 | Friend Husband | |
| 1918 | His Smothered Love | |
| 1918 | The Battle Royal | |
| 1918 | Her Screen Idol | |
| 1918 | Her Blighted Love | |
| 1918 | Whose Little Wife Are You? | |
| 1918 | Her First Mistake | |
| 1919 | Rip & Stitch, Tailors | |
| 1919 | Reilly's Wash Day | |
| 1919 | The Little Widow | |
| 1919 | Trying to Get Along | |
| 1919 | Treating 'em Rough | |
| 1919 | Uncle Tom Without the Cabin | |
| 1919 | Back to the Kitchen | |
| 1920 | The Star Boarder | |
| 1920 | Down on the Farm | |
| 1920 | Fresh from the City | |
| 1920 | Let 'er Go! | |
| 1920 | Great Scott! | |
| 1920 | It's a Boy! | |
| 1920 | My Goodness | |
| 1921 | A Fireside Brewer | |
| 1921 | Dabbling in Art | |
| 1921 | On a Summer's Day | |
| 1921 | The Unhappy Finish | |
| 1921 | Made in the Kitchen | |
| 1922 | The Duck Hunter | |
| 1922 | Step Forward | |
| 1922 | Ma and Pa | |
| 1922 | Bow Wow | |
| 1922 | The Strangers' Banquet | |
| 1923 | Where's My Wandering Boy This Evening? | |
| 1923 | Pitfalls of a Big City | |
| 1923 | Skylarking | |
| 1923 | Asleep at the Switch | |
| 1923 | The Extra Girl | |
| 1924 | A Boy of Flanders | |
| 1924 | The Hollywood Kid | |

== See also ==
- Luke the Dog
- Pete the Pup
- Jean (dog)
- List of individual dogs
