= Whose Baby? =

1917 film directed by Clarence G. Badger

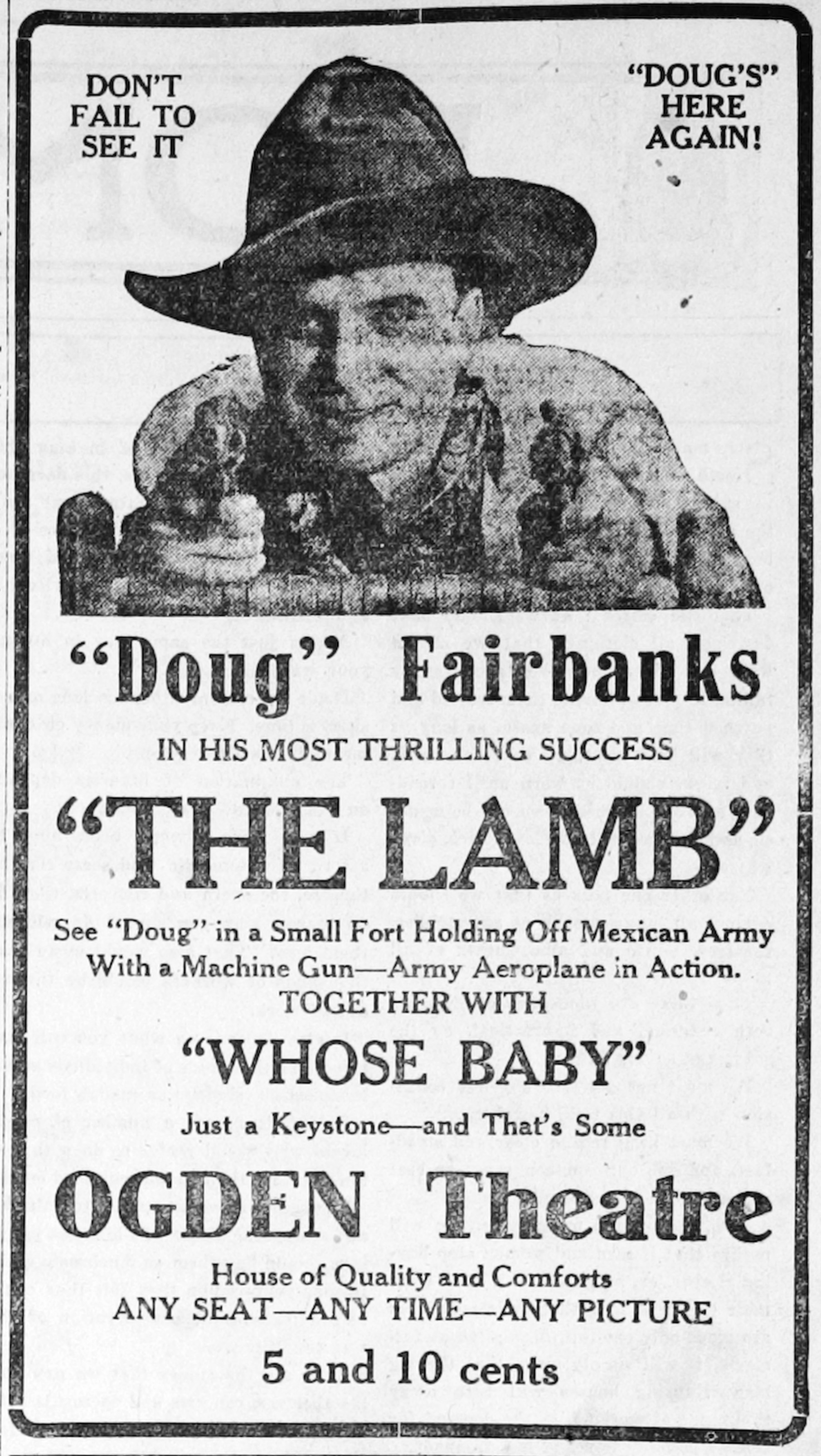
- Whose Baby? advertised as a double feature with the 1915 film The Lamb
- Directed by: Clarence G. Badger
- Produced by: Mack Sennett
- Starring: Gloria Swanson
- Production company: Keystone Studios
- Distributed by: Triangle Film Corporation
- Release date: July 1, 1917
- Running time: 2 reels
- Country: United States
- Languages: Silent; English intertitles

Whose Baby? is a 1917 American silent comedy film directed by Clarence G. Badger and starring Gloria Swanson.

== Cast ==
- Bobby Vernon
- Gloria Swanson
- Jay Dwiggins
- Martha Trick
- Robert Milliken
- Fritz Schade
- Juanita Hansen
- Sylvia Ashton
- Helen Bray
- Florence Clark
- Phyllis Haver
- William Irving
- Edgar Kennedy
- Myrtle Lind
- Roxana McGowan
- Virginia Nightingale
- Marvel Rea
- Earle Rodney
- Vera Steadman
- Ethel Teare
- Wyn Roberts

== Reception ==
Like many American films of the time, Whose Baby? was subject to cuts by city and state film censorship boards. The Chicago Board of Censors cut a scene of a heavy woman sliding down a railing, two scenes of her falling in a gymnasium, and a closeup of her backed up against a wall.

== Preservation ==
Copies of the film are held by the UCLA Film & Television Archive and George Eastman House.
