= The Sultan's Wife =

1917 film directed by Clarence G. Badger

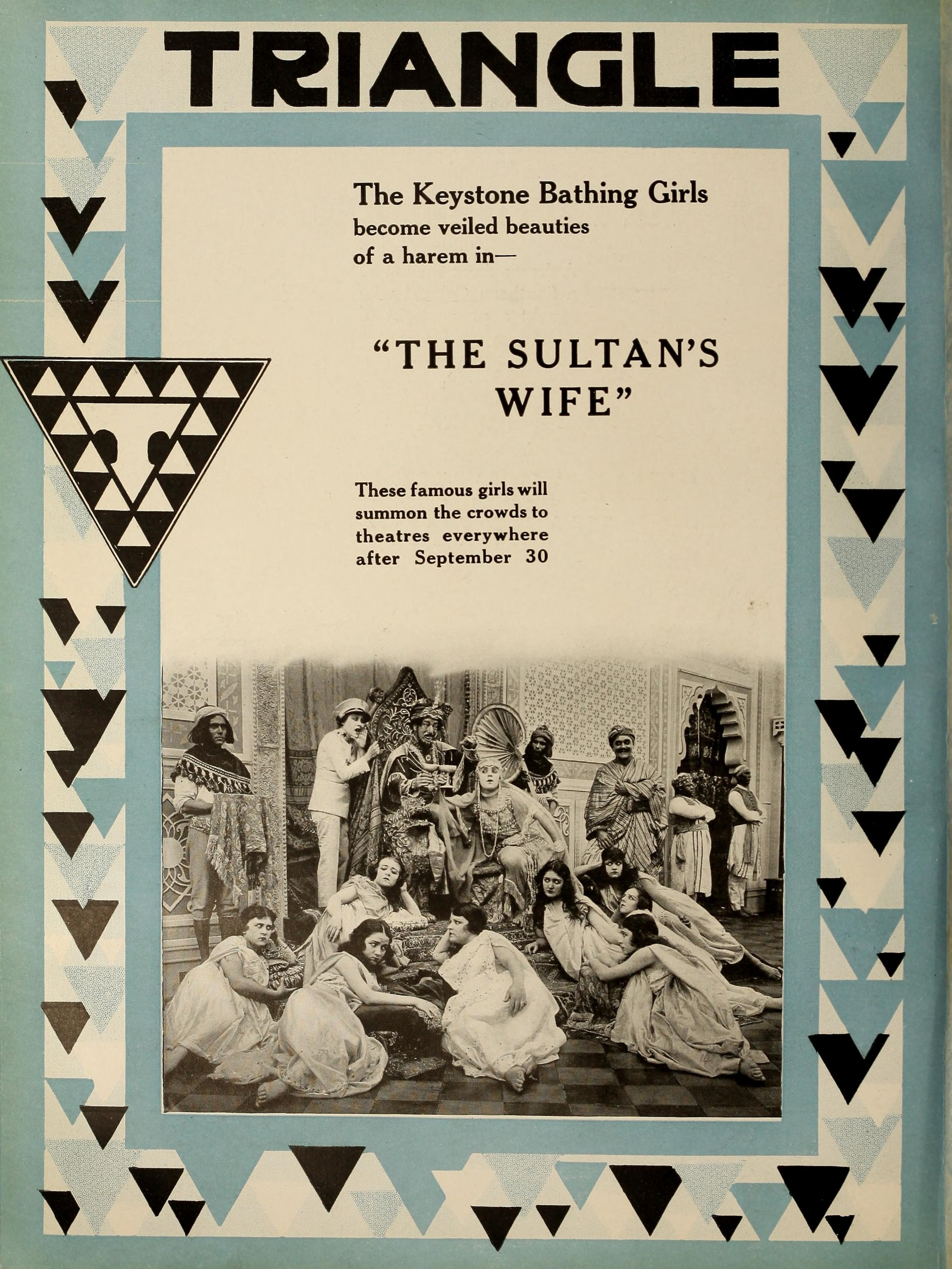
- Advertisement for the film
- Directed by: Clarence G. Badger
- Produced by: Mack Sennett (Keystone Studios)
- Starring: Bobby Vernon; Gloria Swanson
- Production company: Keystone Film Company
- Distributed by: Triangle Film Corporation
- Release date: September 30, 1917
- Running time: 18 minutes; 2 reels
- Country: United States
- Language: Silent (English intertitles)

The Sultan's Wife

The Sultan's Wife is a 1917 American silent comedy film directed by Clarence G. Badger and starring Bobby Vernon and Gloria Swanson. The film is also known under the title Caught in a Harem.

== Plot ==
Gloria follows sailor boyfriend Bobby to India. After she is kidnapped by the sultan, who wants her for his harem, Bobby must come to the rescue.

== Cast ==
- Gloria Swanson as Gloria
- Bobby Vernon as Bobby
- Joseph Callahan
- Teddy the Dog
- Gonda Durand
- Phyllis Haver
- Roxana McGowan
- Vera Steadman
- Edith Valk
- Blanche Payson as Harem Matron (uncredited)

== Reception ==
Like many American films of the time, The Sultan's Wife was subject to cuts by city and state film censorship boards. The Chicago Board of Censors required a cut of the scenes with a man on a bench wiggling his posterior after seeing dancers in the background, of the Sultan falling backwards after the dance and spreading his arms and legs, and of the man and woman knocking into each other.
