= Helen Bray =

American actress (1889–1990)

- Born: November 25, 1889
- Died: October 15, 1990 (aged 100); Redwood City, California, U.S.
- Occupation: Actress
- Years active: 1914–1917

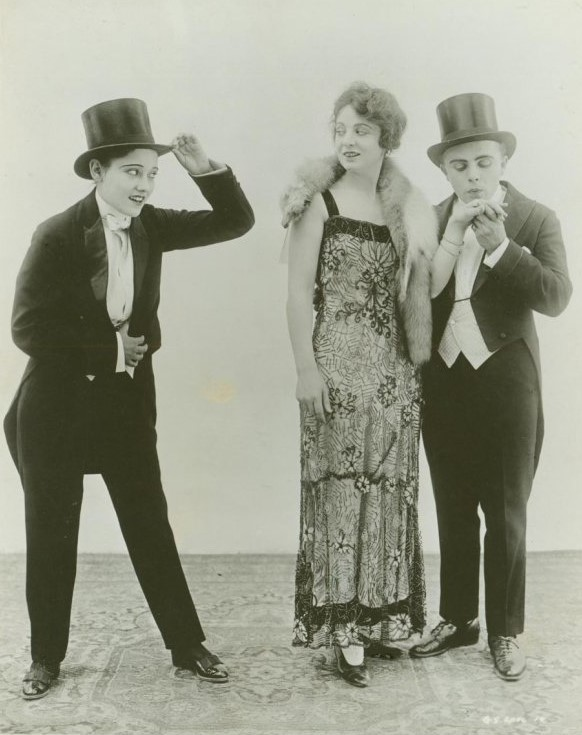
L-R: Gloria Swanson (disguised as a man), Helen Bray, and Bobby Vernon

Helen Bray (November 25, 1889 – October 15, 1990) was a Missouri-born American actress who appeared in several silent films during the early 20th century.

Bray is the great-grandmother of actress Michelle Pierce, who appears now in the TV show NCIS.

== Filmography ==
- Little Miss Optimist (1917)
- Big Timber (1917)
- Whose Baby? (1917)
- A Maiden's Trust (1917)
- The Nick of Time Baby (1916)
- Safety First Ambrose (1916)
- Haystacks and Steeples (1916)
- The Danger Girl (1916)
- Her Stepchildren (1915)
- Woman Without a Soul (1915)
- Bob's Love Affairs (1915)
- The Girl Who Didn't Forget (1915)
- The Mystery of Henri Villard (1915)
- Under Two Flags (1915)
- The Wives of Men (1915)
- The Divided Locket (1915)
- Truth Stranger Than Fiction (1915)
- Felix Holt (1915)
- A Double Winning (1915)
- The Test of Sincerity (1915)
- On the Heights (1914)
- Little Miss Make-Believe (1914)
- The Dole of Destiny (1914)
