= Dangers of a Bride =

1917 film directed by Clarence G. Badger

- Directed by: Clarence G. Badger; Ferris Hartman; Robert P. Kerr; Bobby Vernon
- Produced by: Mack Sennett (Keystone Studios)
- Starring: Gloria Swanson
- Cinematography: Elgin Lessley; George H. Scheibe
- Distributed by: Triangle Film Corporation
- Release date: July 8, 1917
- Running time: 18 minutes; 2 reels
- Country: United States
- Languages: Silent; English intertitles

Dangers of a Bride is a 1917 American silent comedy film directed by Clarence G. Badger and starring Gloria Swanson.

== Cast ==
- Gloria Swanson
- Bobby Vernon
- Agnes Vernon
- Fritz Schade
- Juanita Hansen
- Jay Dwiggins
- Robert Milliken
- Al McKinnon
- Martha Trick
- F.B. Cooper
