= Little Miss Optimist =

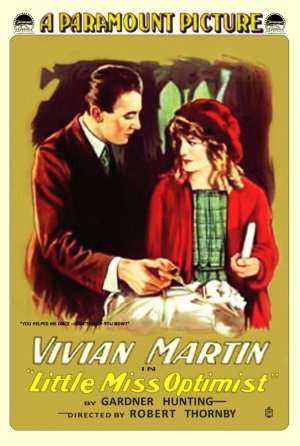
- Theatrical release poster
- Directed by: Robert Thornby
- Screenplay by: Gardner Hunting
- Starring: Vivian Martin; Tom Moore; Charles West; Ernest Joy; Charles K. Gerrard; Helen Bray
- Cinematography: James Van Trees
- Production company: Pallas Pictures
- Distributed by: Paramount Pictures
- Release date: August 26, 1917
- Running time: 50 minutes
- Country: United States
- Language: Silent (English intertitles)

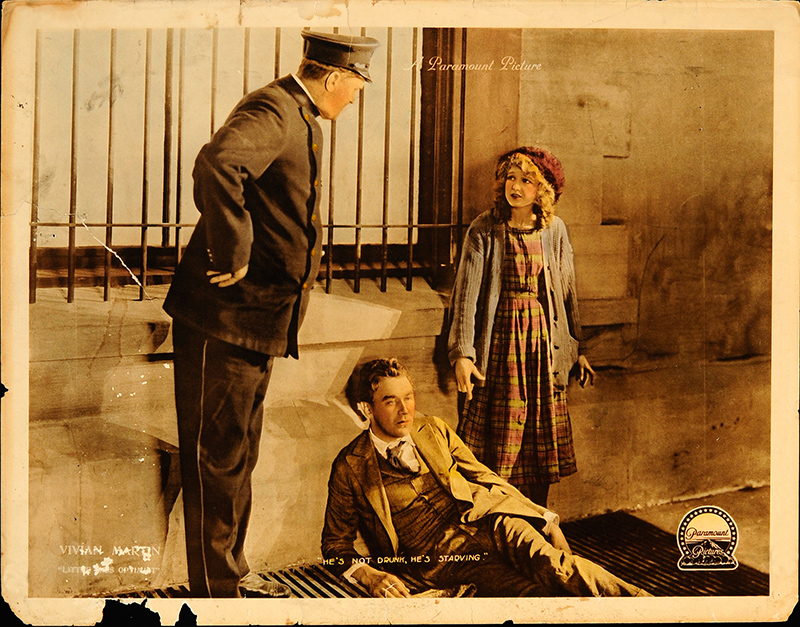
Contemporary lobby card

Little Miss Optimist is a 1917 American silent drama film directed by Robert Thornby and written by Gardner Hunting. The film stars Vivian Martin, Tom Moore, Charles West, Ernest Joy, Charles K. Gerrard, and Helen Bray. The film was released on August 26, 1917, by Paramount Pictures.

== Plot ==
As described in a film magazine, when the foster mother of Mazie-Rosie Carden marries, she is forced to find another home. She is sent to Hope Mission where she is given a place to stay. A millionaire named West is murdered in his home, and Mazie's brother Ben is accused of the crime. Fear of the police drives Mazie to flee to a church where she hides for several days. On Sunday, she is forced to hide in the pulpit and from here she is able to identify the killer through a much damaged coin West had on his person at the time of his murder. With the real murderer brought to justice and her brother free, Mazie is happy. She discovers that she is loved by a young man whom she befriended when he first came to the town, and like a fairy tale they live happily ever after.

== Cast ==
- Vivian Martin as Mazie-Rosie Carden
- Tom Moore as Deal Hendrie
- Charles West as Ben Carden
- Ernest Joy as John West
- Charles K. Gerrard as Samuel Winter
- Helen Bray as Belle Laurie

== Reception ==
Like many American films of the time, Little Miss Optimist was subject to cuts by city and state film censorship boards. The Chicago Board of Censors cut two views of a stamp (the board always cut close-ups of envelopes), and scenes of the murder striking man on his head with a bronze, man striking Carden with the bronze, and two theft scenes.
