= Hearts and Sparks =

1916 film directed by Clarence G. Badger

- Directed by: Clarence G. Badger
- Written by: Roy Del Ruth
- Produced by: Mack Sennett (Keystone Studios)
- Starring: Gloria Swanson
- Cinematography: Paul Garnett
- Distributed by: Triangle Film Corporation
- Release date: June 4, 1916
- Running time: 2 reels
- Country: United States
- Languages: Silent; English intertitles

Hearts and Sparks is a 1916 American silent comedy film directed by Clarence G. Badger and starring Gloria Swanson.

== Cast ==
- Billie Bennett
- Nick Cogley
- Albert T. Gillespie
- Tom Kennedy
- Joe Lee
- Hank Mann
- Slim Summerville
- Gloria Swanson
- Bobby Vernon - Bobby
