= A Boy of Flanders =

1924 film by Victor Schertzinger

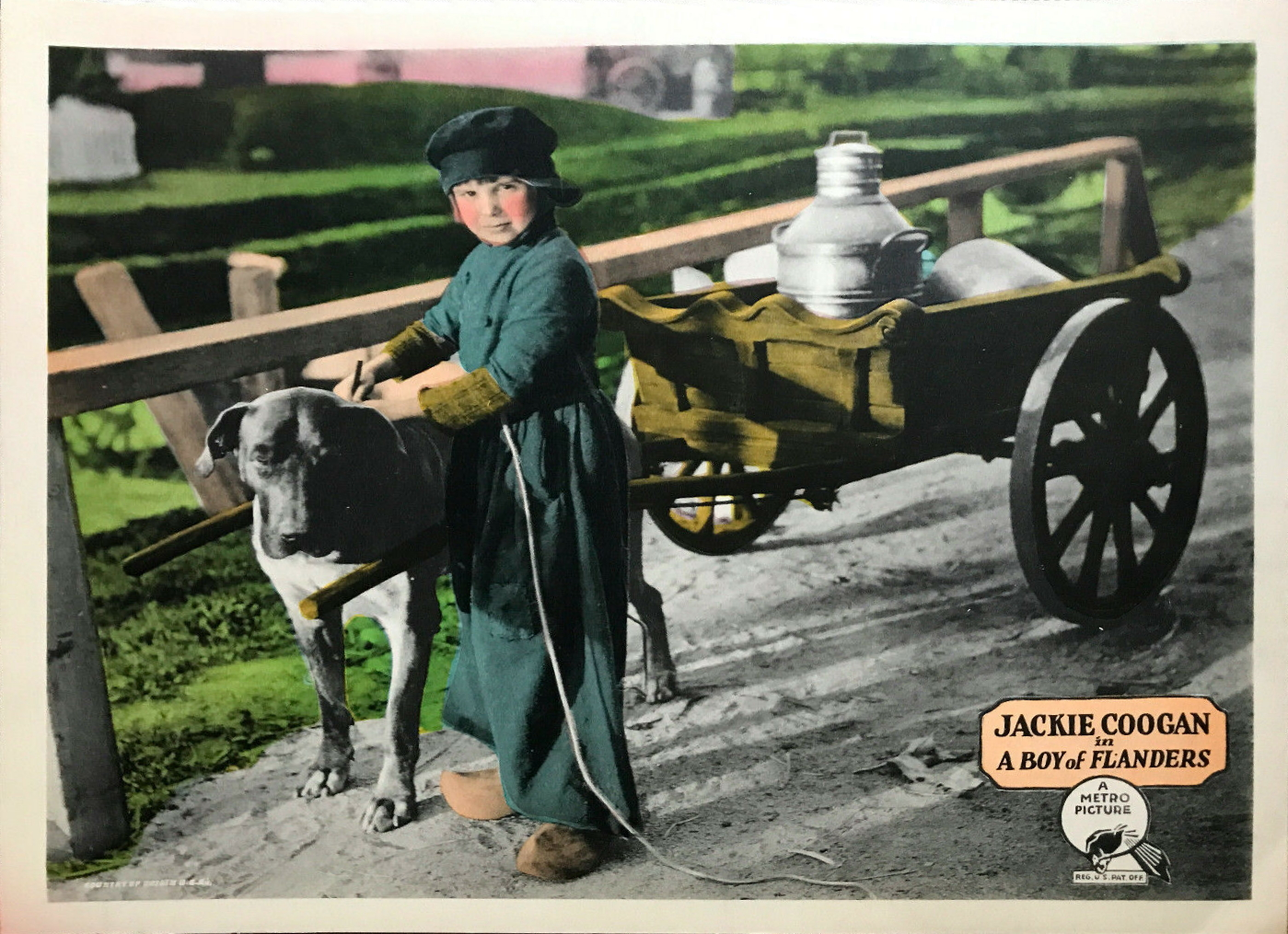
- Jackie Coogan and Teddy (lobby card)
- Directed by: Victor Schertzinger
- Written by: Walter Anthony; Marion Jackson (adaptation)
- Based on: A Dog of Flanders by Ouida
- Produced by: Jack Coogan Sr.
- Starring: Jackie Coogan; Nigel De Brulier; Lionel Belmore
- Cinematography: Frank B. Good; Robert Martin
- Edited by: Irene Morra
- Production company: Jackie Coogan Productions
- Distributed by: Metro-Goldwyn
- Release date: April 7, 1924
- Running time: 7 reels
- Country: United States
- Language: Silent (English intertitles)

A Boy of Flanders is a 1924 American silent family drama film directed by Victor Schertzinger and written by Max Abramson. It is based on the 1872 novel A Dog of Flanders by Ouida. The film stars Jackie Coogan, Nigel De Brulier, and Lionel Belmore. The film was released on April 7, 1924, by Metro-Goldwyn.

== Plot ==
As described in a film magazine review, left orphaned by the death of his mother, Nello is dependent upon his old blind grandfather who sells milk in the village. The child assumes all household responsibilities and takes his grandfather about. His only friend is Alois Cogez and her mother, but her father hates the boy and makes life hard for him. Nello nurses back to health Petrasche, a poor beaten dog, and they become fast friends. Things go from bad to worse and Nello finally decides he can fight it no longer. He goes out into the storm of the night prepared to die, but his faithful dog finds him, he is restored and told that he has won the art prize and is to be adopted by Jan Van Dullen, the noted artist.

== Cast ==
- Jackie Coogan as Nello
- Nigel De Brulier as Jehan Daas
- Lionel Belmore as Baas Cogez
- Nell Craig as Marie Cogez
- Jeanne Carpenter as Alios Cogez
- Russ Powell as Baas Kronstadt
- Ainse Charland as Dumpert Schimmelpennick
- Eugenia Tuttle as Vrow Schimmelpennick
- Lydia Yeamans Titus as Serving Maid
- Larry Fisher as Herr Logarth
- Josef Swickard as Jan Van Dullan
- Sidney Franklin as Herr Brinker
- Monte Collins as Caretaker
- Teddy as The Dog of Boy of Flanders

== Censorship ==
Before A Boy of Flanders could be exhibited in Kansas, the Kansas Board of Review required the removal of all scenes, except one, of Petrasche being beaten.

== Preservation ==
A print of A Boy of Flanders exists at the Gosfilmofond in Russia.
