= The Nick of Time Baby =

1916 film directed by Clarence G. Badger

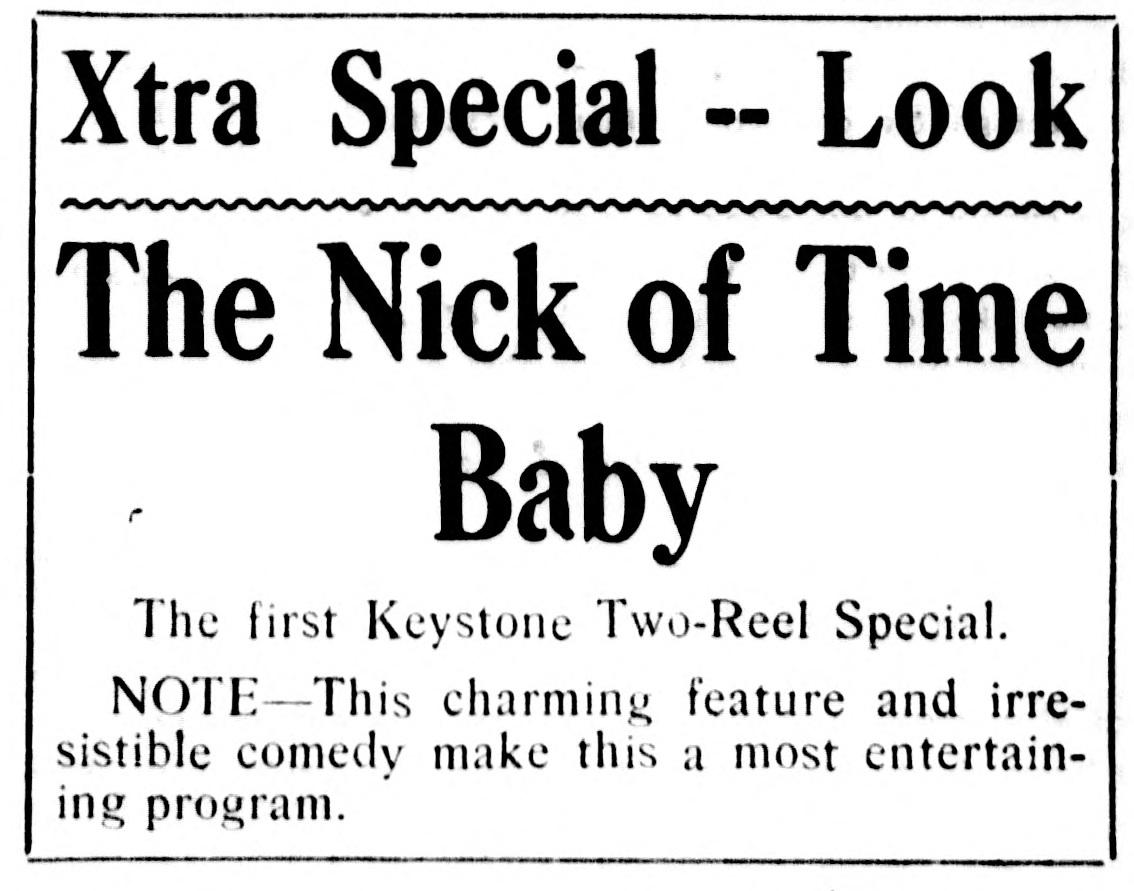
- Contemporary newspaper advert
- Directed by: Clarence G. Badger
- Produced by: Mack Sennett (Keystone Studios)
- Starring: Gloria Swanson
- Distributed by: Triangle Film Corporation
- Release date: February 8, 1916
- Running time: 18 minutes; 2 reels
- Country: United States
- Languages: Silent; English intertitles

The Nick of Time Baby is a 1916 American silent comedy short film directed by Clarence G. Badger and starring Gloria Swanson. A print exists at the Danish Film Institute.

== Cast ==
- Sylvia Ashton
- Robert Bolder (as Bobby Bolder)
- Helen Bray
- Teddy the Dog
- Tom Kennedy
- Larry Lyndon
- Earle Rodney
- Gloria Swanson
- Bobby Vernon as Bobby
