= Demoiselle =

Demoiselle may refer to:

- Demoiselle crane, a crane (bird) of central Asia
- Demoiselle, Calopterygidae, a family of damselflies, in the suborder Zygoptera
- Demoiselle Stakes, a horse race held in New York
- Demoiselle Creek, New Brunswick
- Santos-Dumont Demoiselle, an early aircraft
- Some species of fish in the damselfish family (Pomacentridae), especially:
  - The New Zealand demoiselle, Chromis dispilus
- Memeskia, Miami Indian chief (c. 1695 – 1752), known by the French as "La Demoiselle"

== See also ==
- Les Demoiselles d'Avignon, a 1907 painting by Pablo Picasso
- Les Demoiselles de Rochefort, a 1967 musical film
- The Damoiselle, a 17th-century play by Richard Brome
- Mademoiselle (disambiguation)
- Damsel (disambiguation)
