= Damsel =

Damsel may refer to:

- Damsel in distress a female stock character
- Unmarried lady-in-waiting
- Damsel, Missouri, USA
- Damsel (2018 film), an American western black comedy film
- Damsel (2024 film), an American dark fantasy film
- Damsel, a young adult novel by Elana K. Arnold
- Damsel, a nickname for Santos-Dumont Demoiselle aircraft

== See also ==
- Damsel in Distress (disambiguation)
- Mademoiselle (disambiguation)
- Demoiselle (disambiguation)
- Dame (disambiguation)
- Damsel bug
- Damselfish
- Damselfly
