= Forget Me Not (1922 film) =

1922 silent film by W. S. Van Dyke

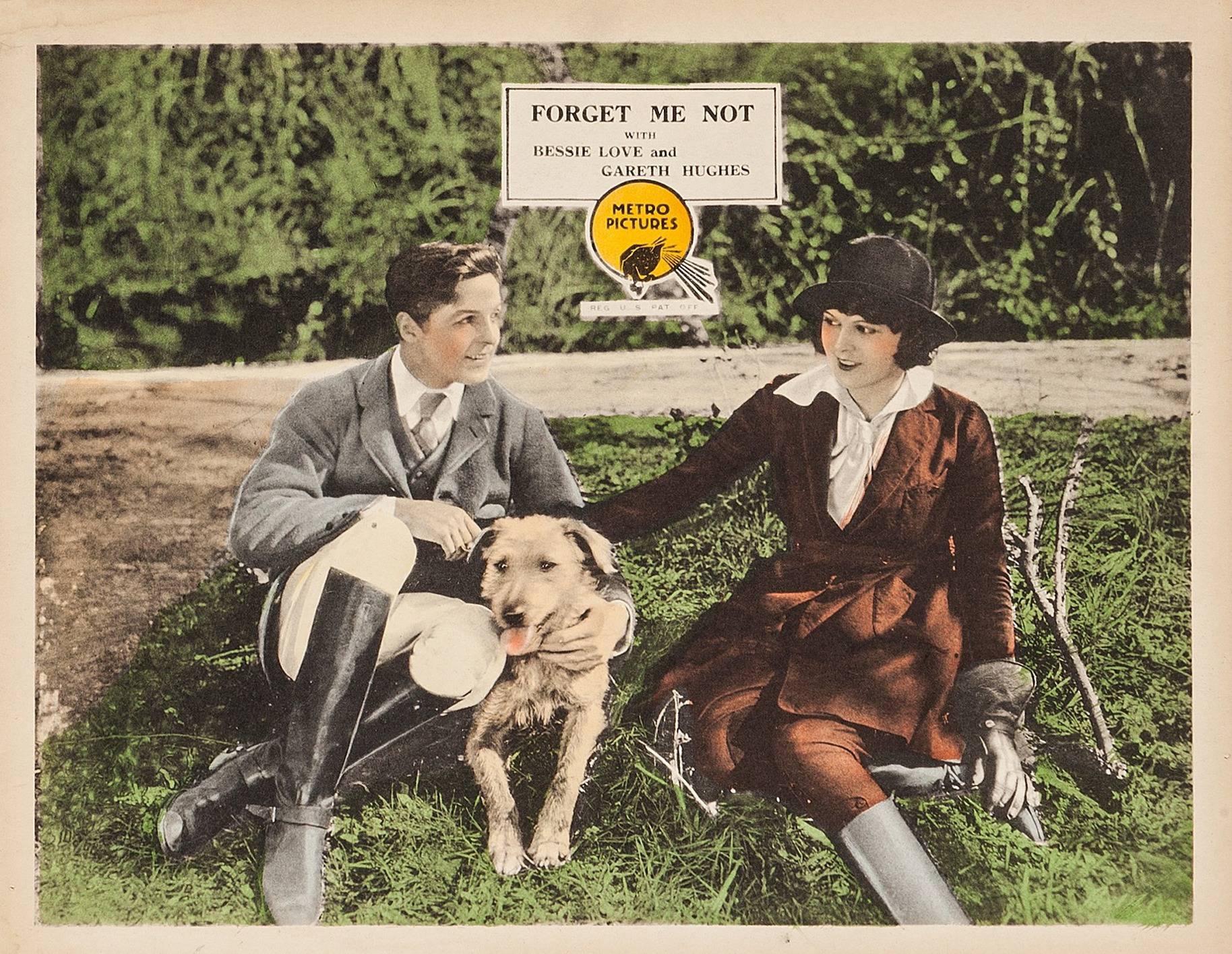
- Lobby card
- Directed by: W. S. Van Dyke
- Written by: Henry Roberts Symonds (story); John B. Clymer (adaptation)
- Produced by: Louis Burston
- Starring: Bessie Love; Gareth Hughes
- Cinematography: Arthur L. Todd
- Distributed by: Metro Pictures
- Release date: July 23, 1922 (U.S.)
- Running time: 6 reels; 6,800 feet
- Country: United States
- Language: Silent (English intertitles)

Forget Me Not, also known as Forget-Me-Not, is a 1922 American silent melodrama film directed by W. S. Van Dyke and distributed by Metro Pictures. The film starred Bessie Love and Gareth Hughes. It is considered a lost film.

== Plot ==
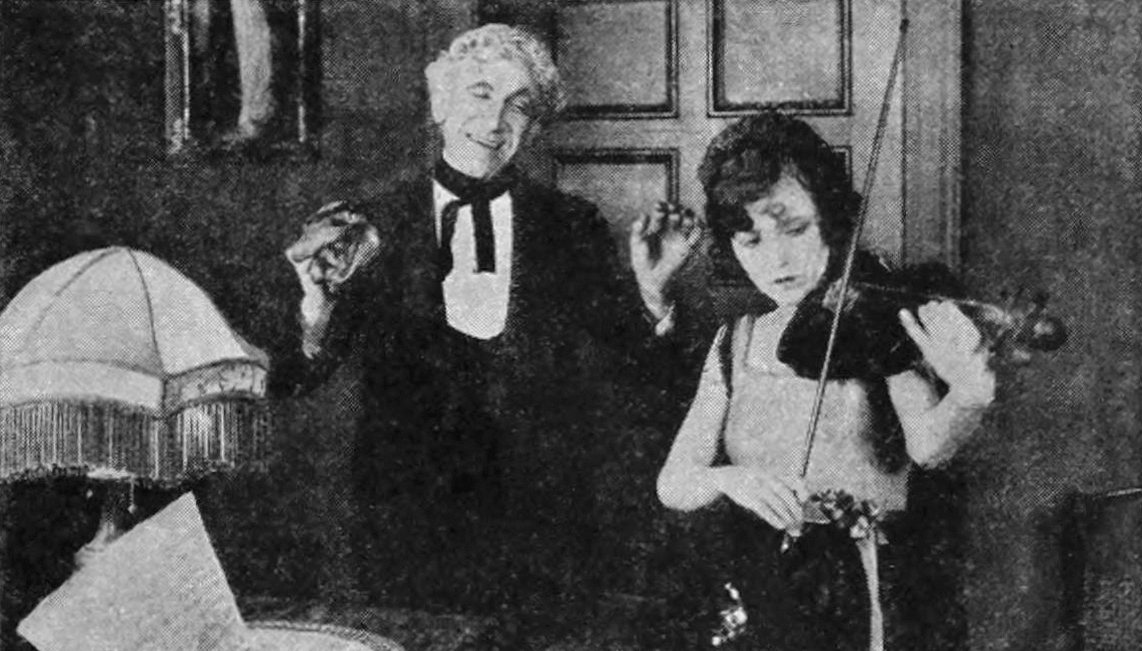
Scene from the film with Otto Lederer and Bessie Love

Young mother Mary Gordoon is too poor to take care of her infant daughter and leaves the child at an orphanage. The girl, Ann grows up with a crippled leg in the orphanage and has fallen in love with a fellow orphan Jimmy. The mother returns to the orphanage after 15 years to adopt her daughter, but believing her daughter to have been adopted by someone else already, she adopts Jimmy instead.

Ann is eventually adopted by a sidewalk musician, who teaches her to play the violin. When Jimmy marries another girl, Ann plays at his wedding. Many years later, after Jimmy's wife dies, the pair are reunited.

== Cast ==
- Irene Hunt as Mary Gordoon, the mother
- Will Machin as the father
- Bessie Love as Ann, the girl
- Gareth Hughes as Jimmy, the boy
- Otto Lederer as Rodolfo, the musician
- Myrtle Lind as the other girl
- Hal Wilson
- Gertrude Claire
- Sam Allen
- W. E. Lawrence

== Production ==
Director W. S. Van Dyke was unhappy about the casting of Bessie Love in the lead, whom he had not chosen.

In preparation for her role, Love spent two weeks at an orphanage.

Scenes were filmed at the Crooked Tree in Arch Beach, Laguna.

The song "A Million Hearts Are Calling: Forget Me Not" with words and music by Billy Baskette and Ernest Lutz, was composed and published for the film.

== Reception ==
The film received generally positive reviews and was commercially successful. According to The Evening Mail, the film "is a fine, clean, beautiful picture… told with such depth of understanding and with entire lack of artificiality that it strikes its note of appeal as few films that have… It is blessed with a cast that could not be improved upon." The Daily News said, "Few who see this little screen drama will not soon forget its sweetness and charm." The New York Times was critical of the film, deeming that it had only "one genuinely poignant moment."

Of the performances, those of Love and Hunt, in particular, were praised. The New York Times reviewer wrote of Hughes's performance that "it is always a pleasure to watch him" and that Love was "sometimes remarkably effective, though occasionally she simpers in an annoying manner".

The film's use of intertitles was criticized.
