= Myrtle Lind =

American actress (1898–1993)

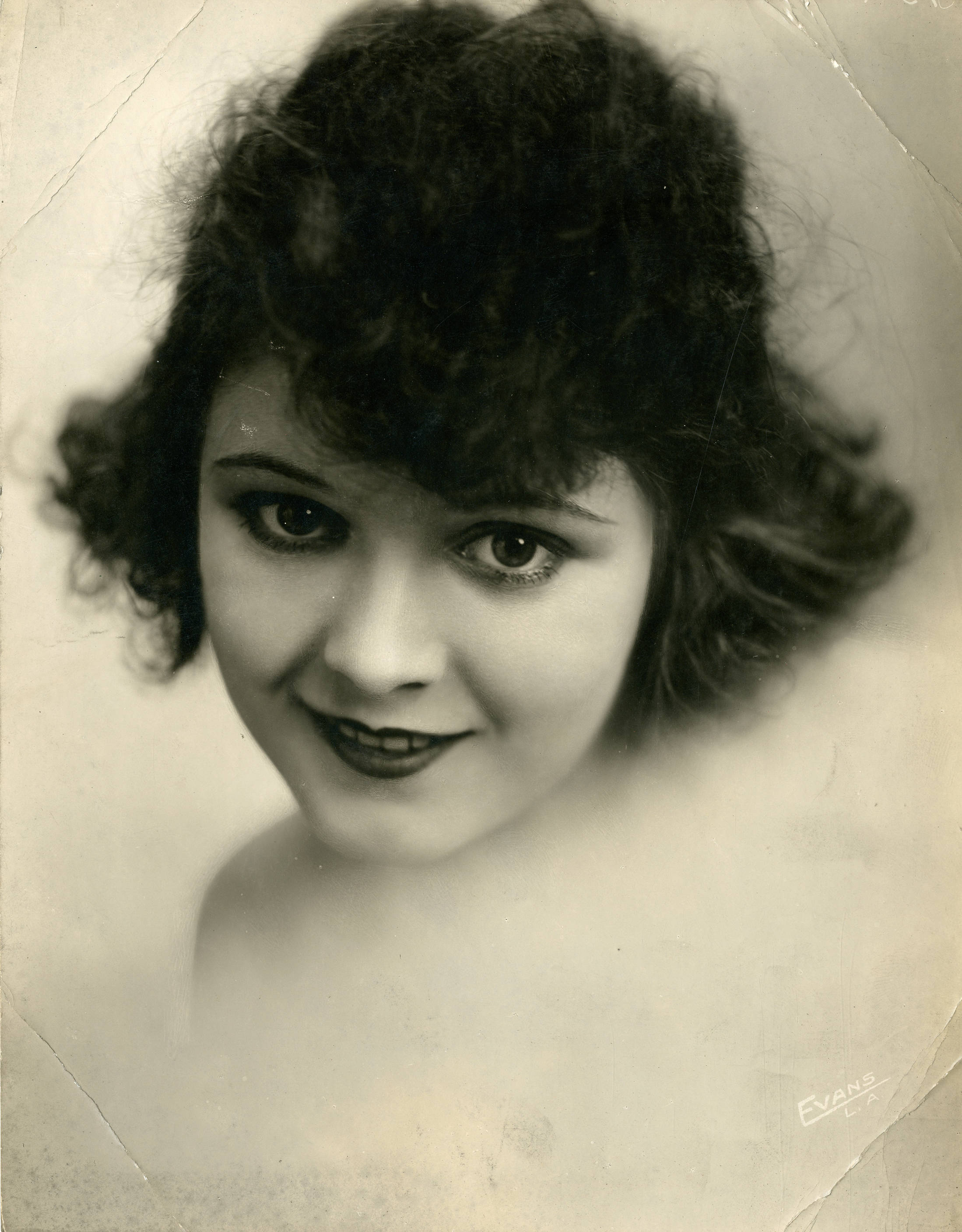
- Lind in 1925
- Born: Margaret Victoria Anderson; September 2, 1898; Mankato, Minnesota, U.S.
- Died: October 12, 1993 (aged 95); Florida, U.S.
- Resting place: Greenwood Cemetery, Itasca County, Minnesota
- Other names: Margaret E. Stevenson
- Occupation: Actress
- Years active: 1916–1922
- Spouses: Frank E. Gessell (m. 1920; div. 1922); William Coleman (m. 1923; div. 1928); Harold S. Stevenson (m. 1929; died 1970)
- Children: 1

Margaret Victoria Anderson (September 2, 1898 – October 12, 1993) known professionally as Myrtle Lind was an American film actress. She was one of Mack Sennett's Bathing Beauties and appeared in several comedy films including with Oliver Hardy and John Gilbert. The Library of Congress has a photo of her holding a large camera on the beach.

Lind transitioned from Bathing Beauty to an actress opposite comedians and then to drama.

== Early life and career ==
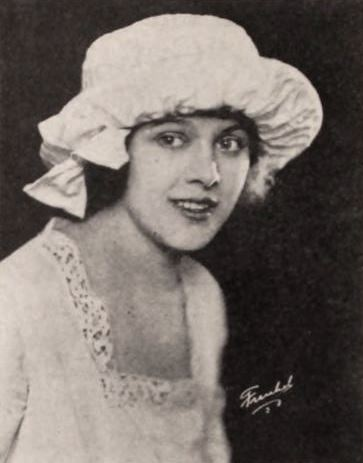
Myrtle Lind in 1921

Myrtle Lind was born Margaret Victoria Anderson in Mankato, Minnesota in 1898 (Lind was a family name). Myrtle's mother Elizabeth Anderson was born in Sweden. She attended dramatic school and appeared in some plays before moving to Hollywood with her parents. In 1916 she started her film career at the Mack Sennett studios. Myrtle appeared in numerous comedy shorts and became one of Sennett's famous bathing beauties. One magazine writer said "Myrtle has the face of an angel and the composure of a Scotch preacher". She worked with Ben Turpin No Mother To Guide Him and with Ford Sterling in A Maiden's Trust. At the Sennett studio Myrtle developed a reputation for being difficult. She was fired several times but was always hired back. Her first starring role was in the 1918 drama Nancy Comes Home. Although she appeared in more than thirty films Myrtle never became a major star. Her final film was Forget Me Not with Bessie Love and decided to retire from acting.

== Personal life ==
In February 1920 she married broker Frank A. Gessell. Unfortunately Frank cheated on her and she left him just two months after the wedding and divorced him in 1922. She married photographer William Coleman in 1922. In December 1923 Myrtle gave birth to a daughter named Jean. She divorced William in 1928 and married Harold S. Stevenson the following year. The couple lived in Atlanta, Georgia where he ran a candy factory. During the 1950s they moved to Ft. Lauderdale, Florida. After her daughter Jean died Myrtle adopted and raised her grandson Steven Harold Frary. She and Harold remained together until his death in 1970. The Sun Sentinel ran an obituary for her in 1993 stating she became known as Margaret E. Stevenson (widow of Harold Stevenson, born in Wisconsin in 1898).

== Death ==
Myrtle spent her final years living quietly in Florida where she died on October 12, 1993, at the age of ninety-five. According to her obituary she was buried next to her husband in Gaffney, South Carolina.

== Filmography ==
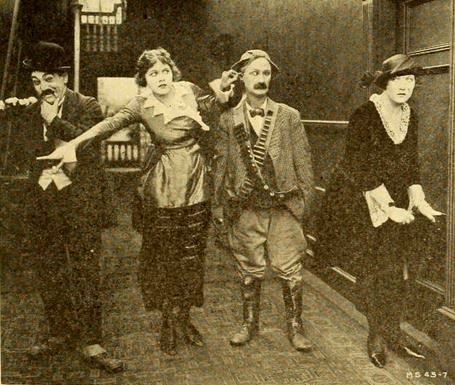
Lind, second from left, in No Mother to Guide Him with Heinie Conklin and Ben Turpin

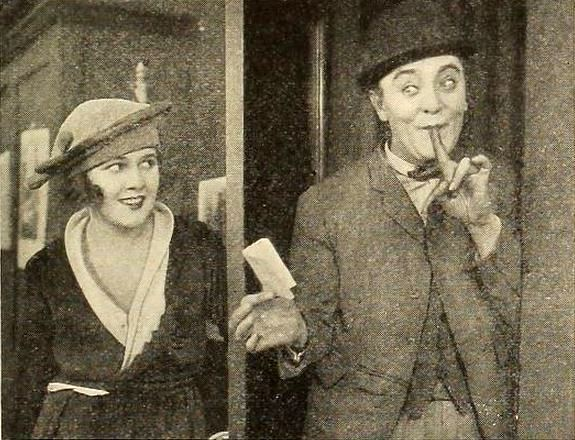
Myrtle Lind and Harry Gribbon in Rip & Stitch: Tailors (1919)

- The Danger Girl (1916)
- Whose Baby? (1917)
- False to the Finish (1917)
- A Maiden's Trust (1917)
- The Village Chestnut (1918), short film
- Nancy Comes Home (1918)
- Playmates (1918)
- Whose Little Wife Are You? (1918), short film
- The Straight and Narrow (1918)
- Yankee Doodle in Berlin (1919)
- The Little Widow (1919)
- No Mother to Guide Him (1919)
- Rip & Stitch Tailors (1919)
- Winners of the West (1921), serial
- Forget Me Not (1922)
