= Haystacks and Steeples =

1916 film directed by Clarence G. Badger

- Directed by: Clarence G. Badger; Bert Lund
- Produced by: Mack Sennett (Keystone Studios)
- Starring: Gloria Swanson
- Cinematography: J.C. Bitzer
- Distributed by: Triangle Film Corporation
- Release date: October 1, 1916
- Running time: 18 minutes; 2 reels
- Country: United States
- Languages: Silent; English intertitles

Haystacks and Steeples is a 1916 American silent comedy film directed by Clarence G. Badger and starring Gloria Swanson.

== Cast ==
- Sylvia Ashton
- Helen Bray
- George Felix
- Reggie Morris
- Della Pringle
- Gloria Swanson
- Josef Swickard
- Eva Thatcher
- Bobby Vernon as Bobby
