= A Double Winning =

1915 film

- Starring: Harry Carey
- Release date: May 1, 1915
- Country: United States
- Language: Silent with English intertitles

A Double Winning is a 1915 American drama film featuring Harry Carey.

== Cast ==
- Helen Bray
- Harry Carey as 2nd Sportsman
- Charles West (credited as Charles H. West)

== See also ==
- List of American films of 1915
- Harry Carey filmography
