= Dangerous Girl =

Dangerous Girl can refer to:

- Dangerous Girl, a 2001 pop song from More (Vitamin C album)
- Dangerous Girl, a 2018 song cowritten by Hwasa and SSS; see Hwasa discography#Songwriting credits
- Dangerous Girl, an alternative title for the 1953 melodrama movie Storms (film)

== See also ==
- Dangerous Girls, a 2003 young adult horror novel by R. L. Stine
- Girl in Danger (disambiguation)
- Danger Girl (disambiguation)
- Damsel in Distress (disambiguation)
- Dangerous (disambiguation)
- Girl (disambiguation)
