= Mademoiselle =

Mademoiselle (abbreviated as Mlle or M^{lle}) may refer to:

- Mademoiselle (title), the French-language equivalent of the title "miss"

== Film and television ==
- Mademoiselle (1966 film), a French-British drama directed by Tony Richardson
- Mademoiselle (2001 film), a French comedy directed by Philippe Lioret
- Mlle (TV channel), now MOI ET CIE, a Canadian French-language channel

== Music ==
- "Mademoiselle" (song), by Styx, 1976
- "Mademoiselle", a song by Murray Head from Between Us, 1979
- "Mademoiselle", a song by Eddy Howard, 1952

== Other uses ==
- Mademoiselle, a typeface designed by Tommy Thompson
- Mademoiselle (magazine), a defunct American women's magazine

== See also ==
- Damsel (disambiguation)
- Demoiselle (disambiguation)
- Fräulein, a similar German term
