= Stella Maris (1918 film) =

1918 film directed by Marshall Neilan

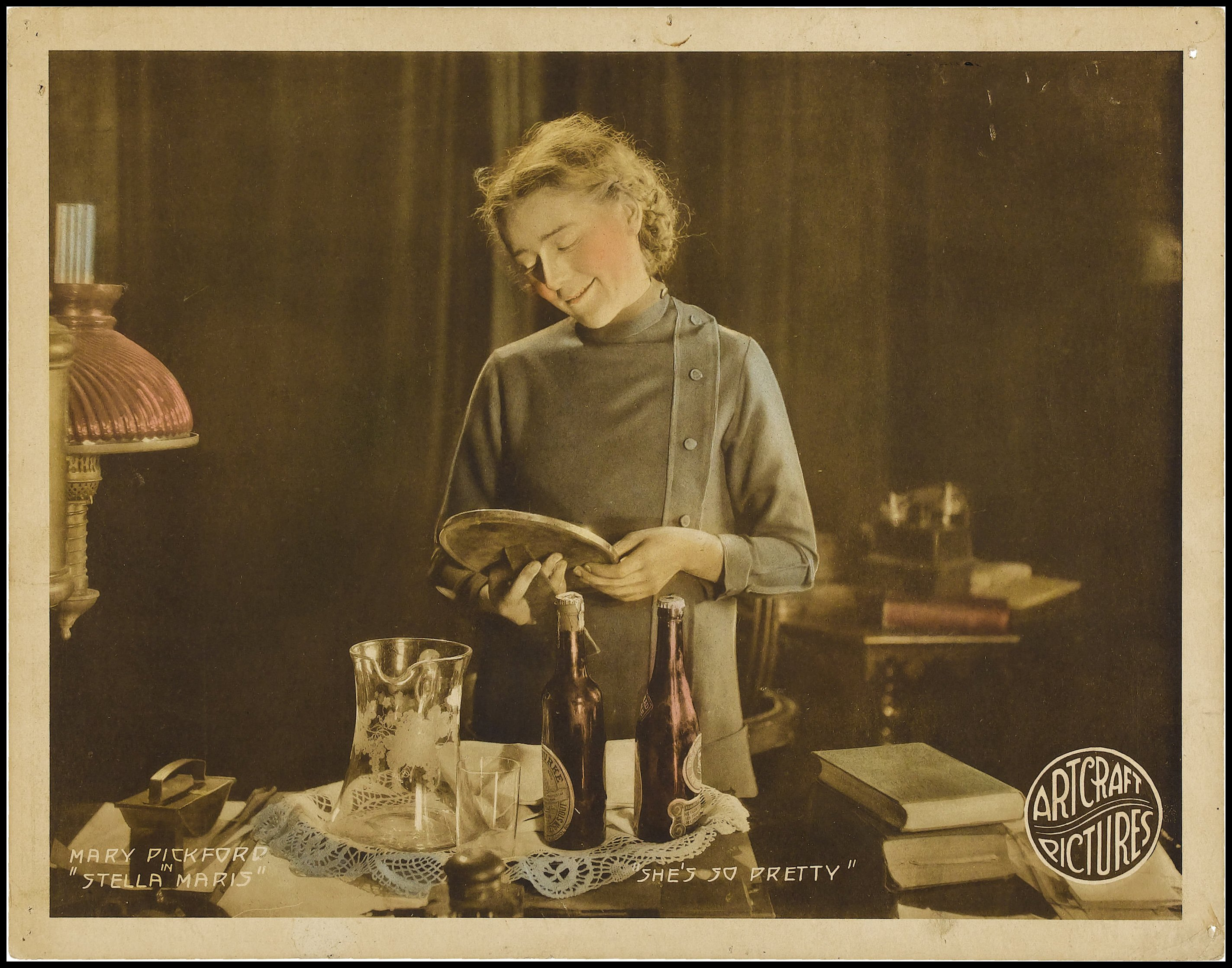
- Lobby card
- Directed by: Marshall Neilan
- Screenplay by: Frances Marion
- Based on: Stella Maris; 1913 novel by William John Locke
- Starring: Mary Pickford; Ida Waterman; Herbert Standing
- Cinematography: Walter Stradling
- Production company: Mary Pickford Film Corporation
- Distributed by: Famous Players–Lasky/Artcraft
- Release date: January 21, 1918
- Running time: 80 minutes
- Country: United States
- Languages: Silent; English intertitles
- Box office: $600,000 (rentals)

Stella Maris

Stella Maris is a 1918 American silent drama film directed by Marshall Neilan, written by Frances Marion and based on William John Locke's 1913 novel of the same name. The film stars Mary Pickford in dual roles as the title character and an orphan servant.

The film was remade in 1925, with Mary Philbin in the title role.

== Plot ==
Stella Maris was born paralyzed and is unable to walk. Her wealthy guardians try to prevent her from being exposed to all the bad that is happening in the world. She is not allowed to leave her room in a London mansion and is bound to her bed. Her door even has a sign on it which says: "All unhappiness and world wisdom leave outside. Those without smiles need not enter." Stella has no idea a war is going on in the world and that there are poor and hungry people.

John Risca is a well-known journalist and a friend of the family. He has been unhappily married to Louise for six years now and frequently visits Stella. John wants Stella to think he is perfect and lies about being unmarried. Louise, meanwhile, wants a servant in her house and hires orphan Unity Blake. Unity is uneducated and has been deprived and mistreated for her entire life. This resulted in her being afraid of everyone.

One night, a drunk Louise orders Unity to get some groceries. Unity does what she is told and on her way back, the food is stolen by kids. She returns to the home only to be beaten by an outraged Louise. Unity is severely hurt and Louise gets arrested. It is announced she will have to serve three years in prison. John is kinder to Unity and adopts her. Unity is very grateful and falls in love with him. John himself is only interested in Stella. John wishes Unity to be raised at the Blount's residence, but they don't want her. They prevent her from meeting Stella, fearing Stella will notice there are suffering people in the world. They finally convince John to raise Unity at Aunt Gladys' house. However during one visit at the Blount residence, Unity catches the family dog taking a silk jacket belonging to Gladys and chases after him to get it back and avoid trouble. She catches it in Stella's room, but before she can leave, Stella asks her to come in. She notices some resemblance that Unity has to her, despite her simple looks. They slowly start becoming friends and get to know each other. However, the nurse catches Unity in Stella's room and tells her to leave.

In order to make John fall in love with her, Unity starts to educate herself with Aunt Gladys' help. For the first time, Unity finally feels like she belongs in a loving home and Aunt Gladys is the closest she has to having a caring mother. Meanwhile, Stella gets an operation and is able to walk after three years. She meets John and they fall in love. One day she decides to give John a surprise visit. Louise, who has just been released from jail, opens the door and tells Stella the truth about her marriage. Stella is heartbroken upon learning that he lied to her about his marriage. Feeling betrayed, she tells John to leave her alone and refuses to talk to her family upon seeing how much sadness and pain are in the world.

Meanwhile, Unity uses one of John's suits and pretends he is asking her to marry him. When he comes home heartbroken over losing Stella, she tries to busy herself with work. Unity hears Aunt Gladys' concerns about John's inability to be free to love Stella while Louise lives. She realizes she and John can never be a couple. As an act of kindness to them, she decides to help get rid of Louise for good, sneaks inside a room and gets a gun. At her relatives' home, Stella reconciles with them and comes to the realization that while there will be sadness and pain in the world, there are also joy and happiness that follows it.

At Aunt Gladys' home, Unity gets her revenge and shoots Louise in her bed before committing suicide by killing herself to make it look like it's a revenge-murder. The next day, John receives a suicide note from her explaining her actions and wants him to be happy with Stella. The police agree knowing Unity's past experience with abuse. Aunt Gladys convinces Stella's wealthy relatives to give John another chance and not think badly about Unity, explaining she helped free him from his abusive wife. John is reunited with Stella and they get married.

== Cast ==
- Mary Pickford as Miss Stella Maris / Unity Blake
- Ida Waterman as Lady Eleanor Blount, A.K.A. Aunt Julia
- Herbert Standing as Sir Oliver Blount
- Conway Tearle as John Risca
- Marcia Manon as Louise Risca
- Josephine Crowell as Aunt Gladys Linden
- Teddy the Dog as Himself (courtesy of Mack Sennett)
- Lou Conley as The Nurse (uncredited)
- Gustav von Seyffertitz as The Surgeon (uncredited)

== Reception ==
Like many American films of the time, Stella Maris was subject to cuts by city and state film censorship boards. For example, the Chicago Board of Censors required a cut of the shooting by Unity.

== Preservation status ==
Stella Maris still exists with copies preserved at the Mary Pickford Institute for Film Education and the Library of Congress.

== DVD release ==
Stella Maris was released on Region 0 DVD by Milestone Film & Video on April 18, 2000.
