= Clarence Badger =

American film director (1880–1964)

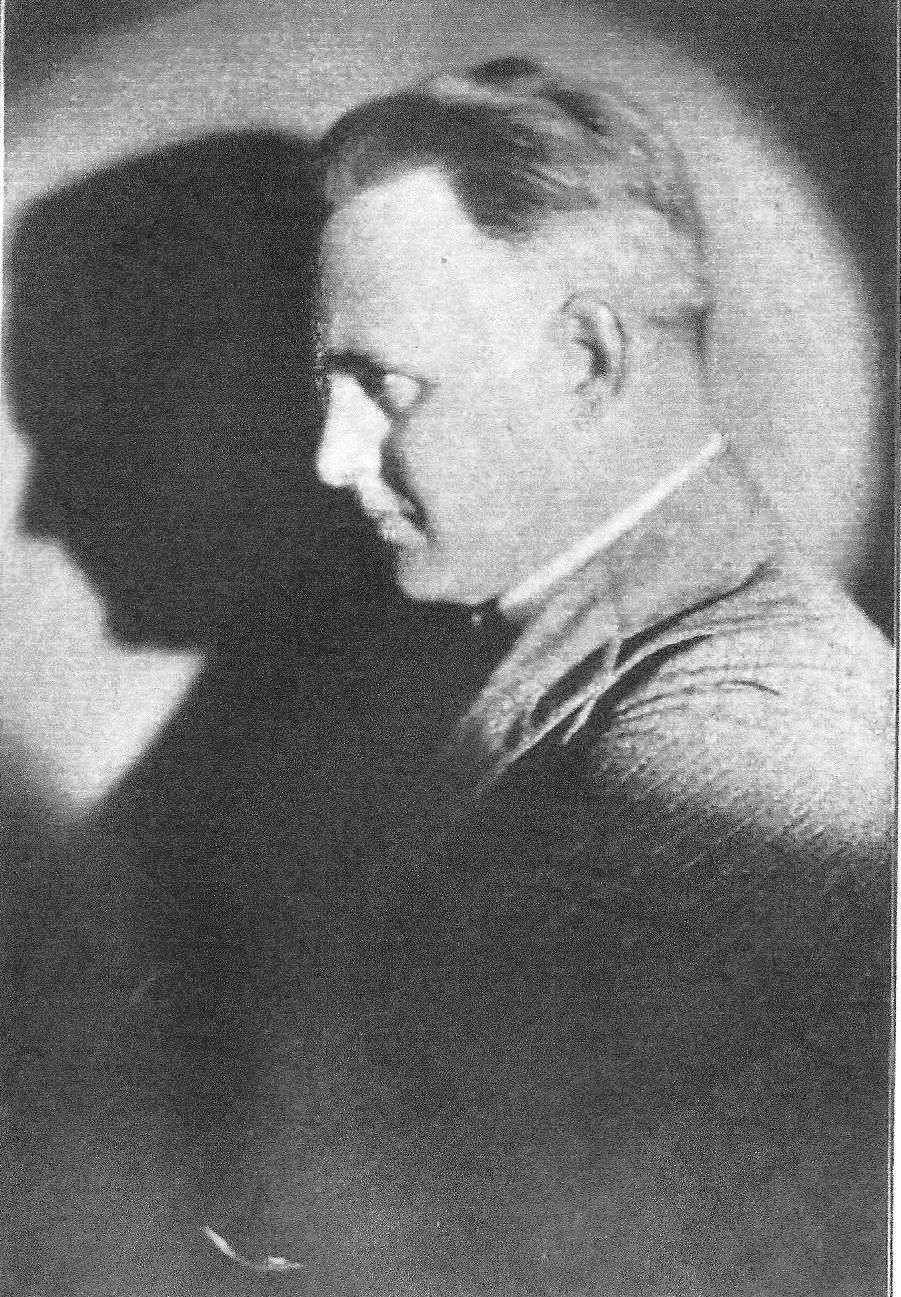
- Born: Clarence G. Badger; June 9, 1880; San Francisco, California, United States
- Died: June 17, 1964 (aged 84); Sydney, Australia
- Occupations: Film director, screenwriter, film producer
- Years active: 1915–1941

Clarence G. Badger (June 9, 1880 – June 17, 1964) was an American film director of feature films in the 1910s, 1920s and 1930s. His films include It and Red Hair, more than a dozen features and shorts starring Will Rogers, and two features starring Raymond Griffith, Paths to Paradise and Hands Up!

He moved to Australia to direct Rangle River (1936) and decided to retire there, only making one more feature, That Certain Something (1941).

== Selected filmography ==
- The Nick of Time Baby (1916)
- Hearts and Sparks (1916)
- A Social Cub (1916)
- The Danger Girl (1916)
- Haystacks and Steeples (1916)
- Teddy at the Throttle (1917)
- Dangers of a Bride (1917)
- Whose Baby? (1917)
- The Sultan's Wife (1917)
- The Pullman Bride (1917)
- The Floor Below (1918)
- Friend Husband (1918)
- The Kingdom of Youth (1918)
- Day Dreams (1919)
- Sis Hopkins (1919)
- Through the Wrong Door (1919)
- Almost a Husband (1919)
- Leave It to Susan (1919)
- The Strange Boarder (1920)
- Jes' Call Me Jim (1920)
- Cupid the Cowpuncher (1920)
- The Man Who Lost Himself (1920)
- Quincy Adams Sawyer (1922)
- The Dangerous Little Demon (1922)
- Don't Get Personal (1922)
- Potash and Perlmutter (1923)
- Your Friend and Mine (1923)
- Red Lights (1923)
- The Shooting of Dan McGrew (1924)
- One Night in Rome (1924)
- Eve's Secret (1925)
- Paths to Paradise (1925)
- Hands Up! (1926)
- Miss Brewster's Millions (1926)
- The Campus Flirt (1926)
- It (1927)
- A Kiss In A Taxi (1927)
- Senorita (1927)
- Swim Girl, Swim (1927)
- She's a Sheik (1927)
- Red Hair (1928)
- The Fifty-Fifty Girl (1928)
- Hot News (1928)
- Three Weekends (1928)
- Paris (1929)
- No, No, Nanette (1930)
- The Bad Man (1930)
- Woman Hungry (1931)
- When Strangers Marry (1933)
- Rangle River (1936)
- That Certain Something (1941) - also writer
