= Empress Theatre (California) =

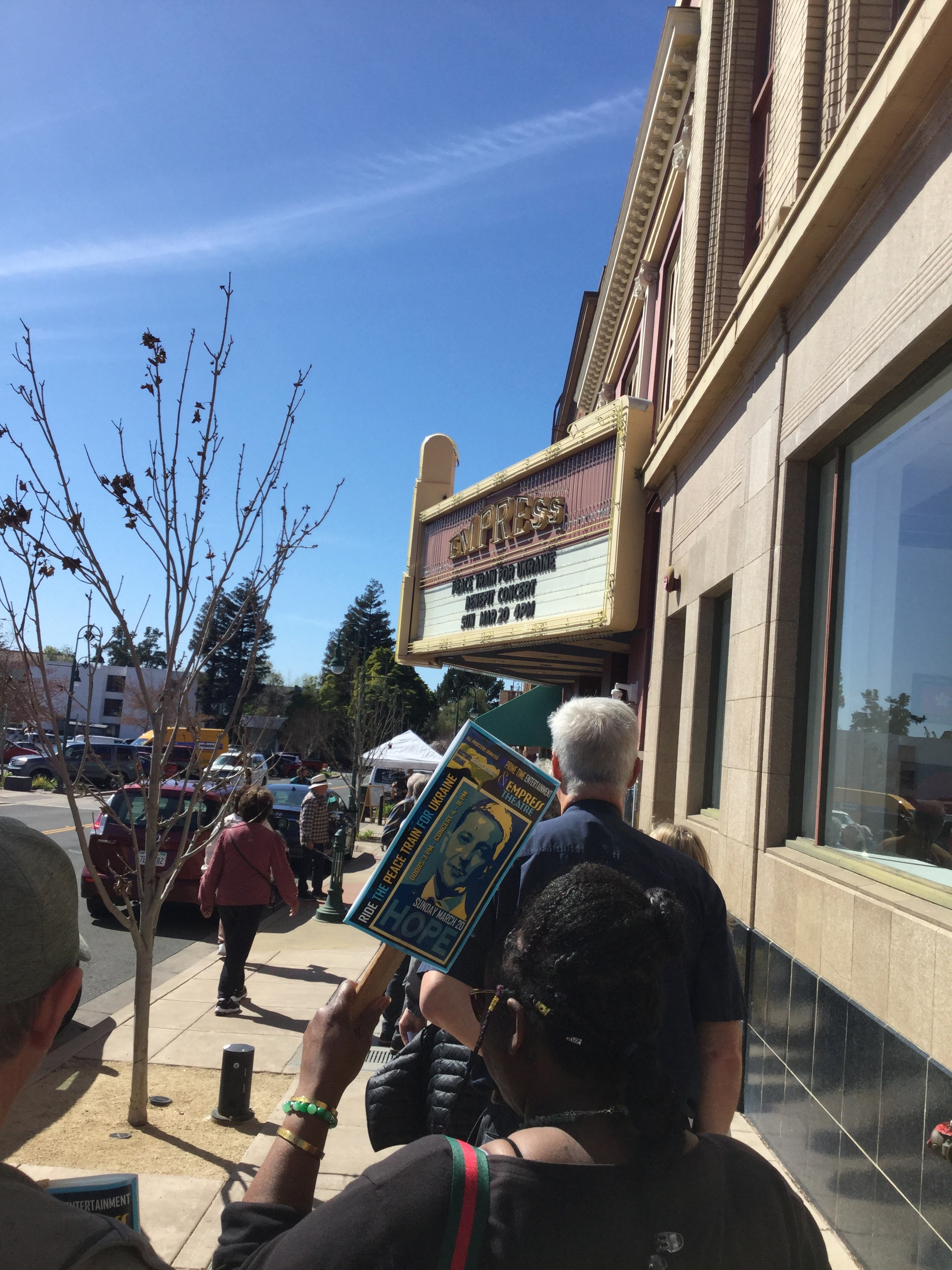
- Empress Theatre
- Interactive map of Empress Theatre
- Location: 330 Virginia Street, Vallejo, California 94590
- Coordinates: 38.10223°N 122.25767°W

The Empress Theatre is a historical landmark located in downtown Vallejo, California built in 1911. It was re-opened in 2008 after nearly 20 years of disuse following the 1989 Loma Prieta earthquake. The one room movie house has undergone complete renovation and seismic retrofit. Operated as a non-profit, it now shows movies, hosts live performances, and is rented for private events.

== History ==
=== The Empress (1911–1912) ===
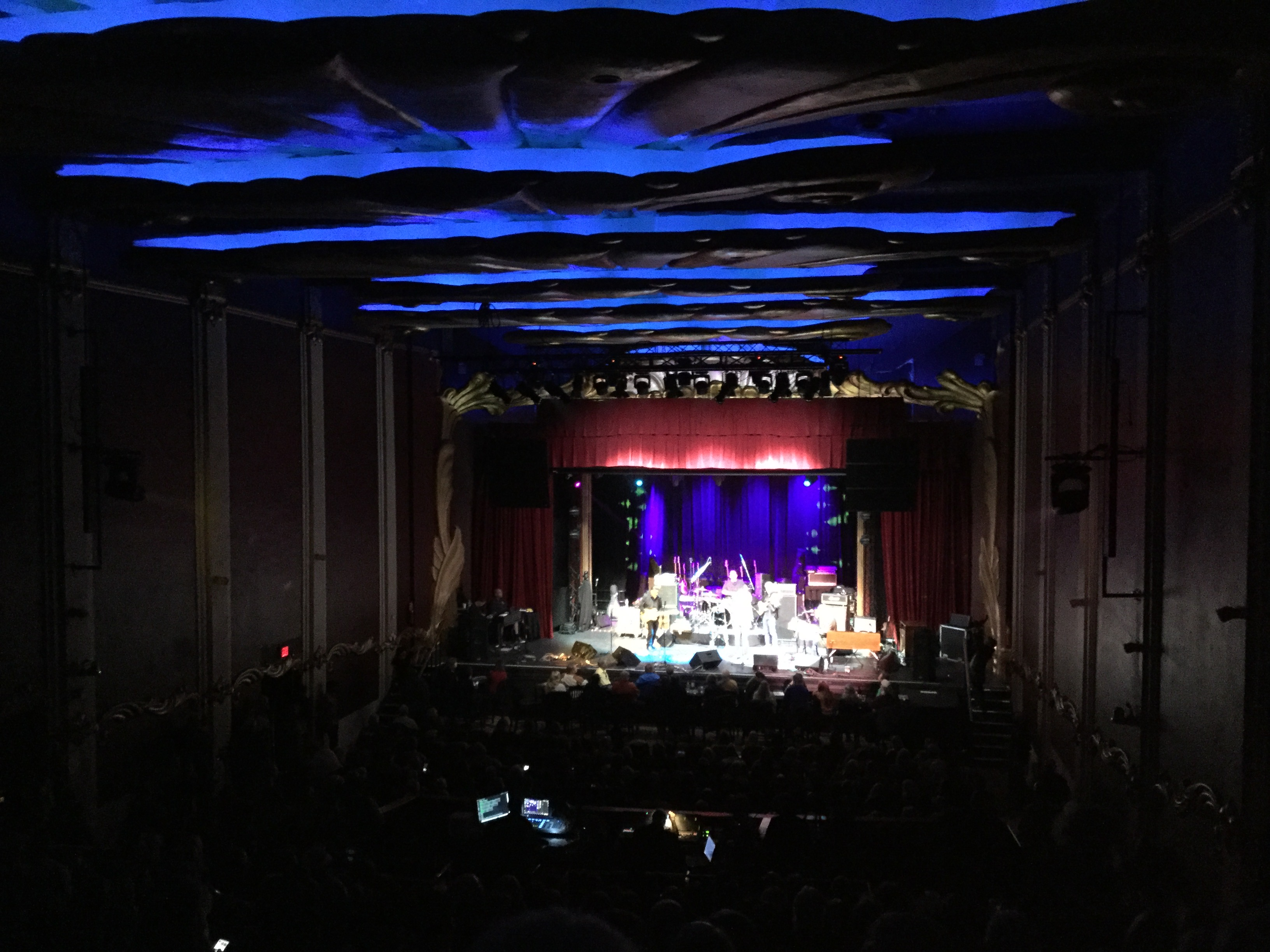
A band performs on stage at the Empress Theatre in Vallejo

1911

Theatre was built by Independent Order of Odd Fellows and crowned the Empress Theatre. The building, designed by local architect, William A. Jones, was two-tiered with gold-leafed clouds on the ceiling, red velvet seats, and a pipe organ. The managers were ex-pats from San Francisco, Abe Marks and Gus Cohen.

The Vallejo Evening Chronicle anticipated the theatre to be "...one of the prettiest small theatres on the coast" (January 23, 1912).

1912

The curtain of The Empress Theatre rose for the first time on February 14 with a Sullivan and Considine vaudeville act (at the time, widely regarded as the most influential promoters of vaudeville acts in the country) where there were two performances each night with matinees on Saturday and Sunday. There were 940 seats and admission prices were 10¢, 20¢, and 30¢. Ushers wore red military uniforms trimmed with gold braid.

=== The Republic (1913–1915) ===
1913-1915

As with any change in management, when the Bert Levey Circuit was brought in to produce greater profits, the company changed the theatre's name from the Empress to the Republic to avoid confusion with another of their California theatres with the same name.

=== The Vallejo Theatre (1916–1928) ===
1916

The Theatre lease was transferred to Thomas O'Day who spent $5000 on improvements. The establishment reopened as the New Vallejo Theatre in which patrons enjoyed new cushion seats.

1920

The United States Constitution outlawed the manufacture, sale, and transport of alcohol. The prohibition era began and endured for 13 years. During this time, musical comedies and eventually talking movies became the popular mode of entertainment.

=== The Fox Senator (1929–1951) ===
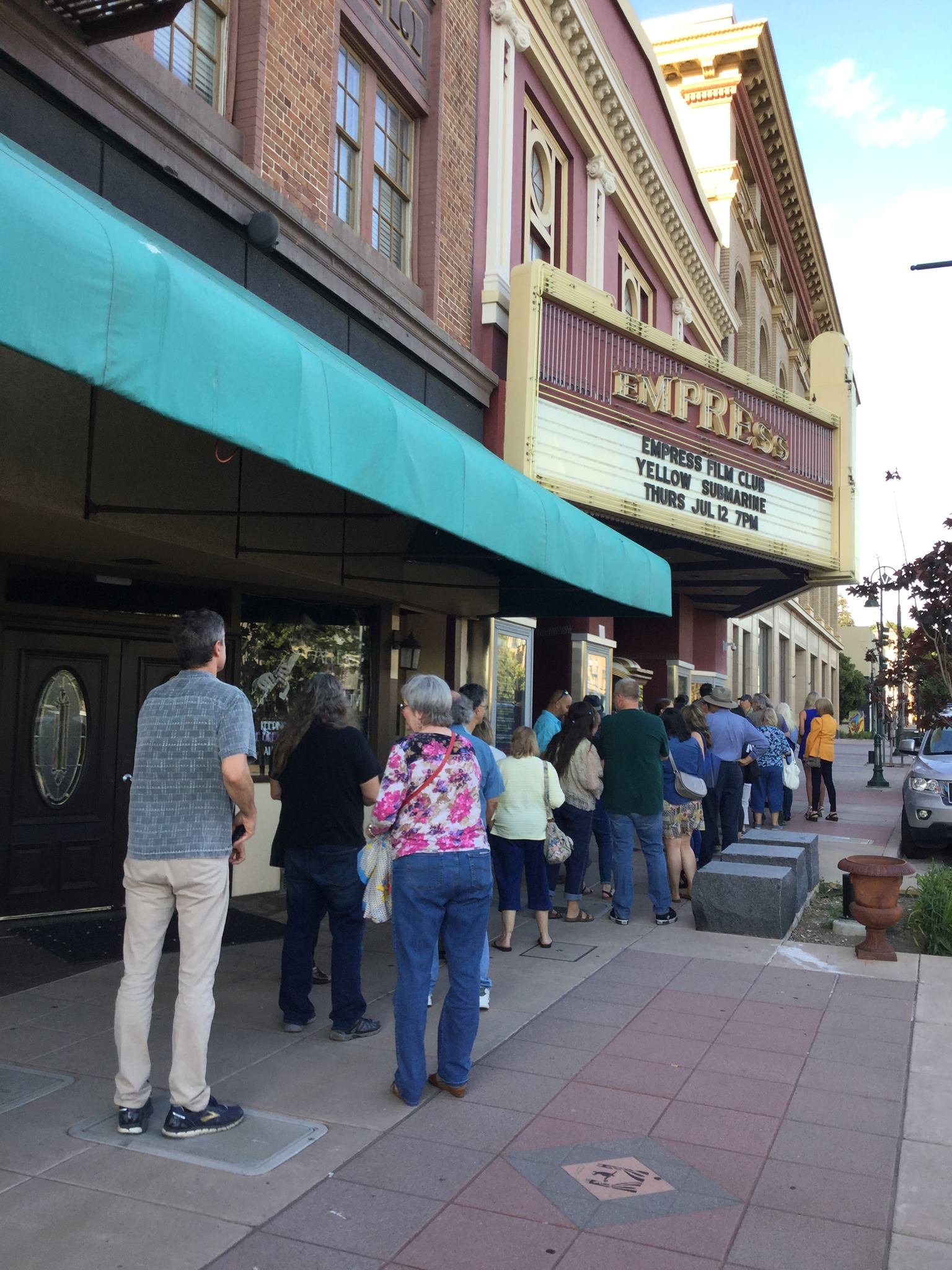
People line up outside the Empress Theatre in Vallejo to see the Beatles Yellow Submarine

1929

Fox West Coast Theaters chain took over the operation and fully renovated the building's interior. The company installed 'talking picture' equipment for the price of $20,000, bringing the theatre into the modern era. Vaudeville as a form of entertainment was eclipsed. On October 24, 1929, known as Black Tuesday, the U.S. stock market crashed and The Great Depression began.

1930

On the evening of March 28, 1930, a disastrous fire gutted the theatre causing nearly irreparable damage valued at $50,000 – little more was left than the rafters and exterior walls. The owner, Fox West Coast, expected to close the theatre for good, but an inspection of the charred wreckage showed promise for a successful rebuild. Fox West Coast took on the challenge.

1931

Major portions of the interior were renovated changing pedestrian traffic flow and seating arrangements to be consistent with other Fox theatres. In addition to a neon marquee, a Men's Toilet/Smoking Room and a Women's Toilet/Cosmetic Room were added. The theatre's structure and framing, stage and back stage areas as well as portions of the pre-fire decorative elements were retained. The building reopened as the Fox Senator Theatre, no longer showing any stage productions in favor of motion picture films.

1951

After the war, Fox Theatre management identified a faster and less expensive method for updating its theatres to create "deluxe motion picture houses." The company developed an in-house design department and renovated approximately 200 of their theatres to reflect the new corporate standards. The buildings were updated to feature brightly lit marquees, aluminum panels, display cases, juke box-like ticket booths and gypsum ornamentation referred to as the "Skouras-Style." Decorative elements included undulating waves, lush swags, drapery and cloud-like gilded forms to draw the eye toward the screen. The Fox Senator's lobby, foyer and interior auditorium space were renovated.

=== The Crest (1952–1979) ===
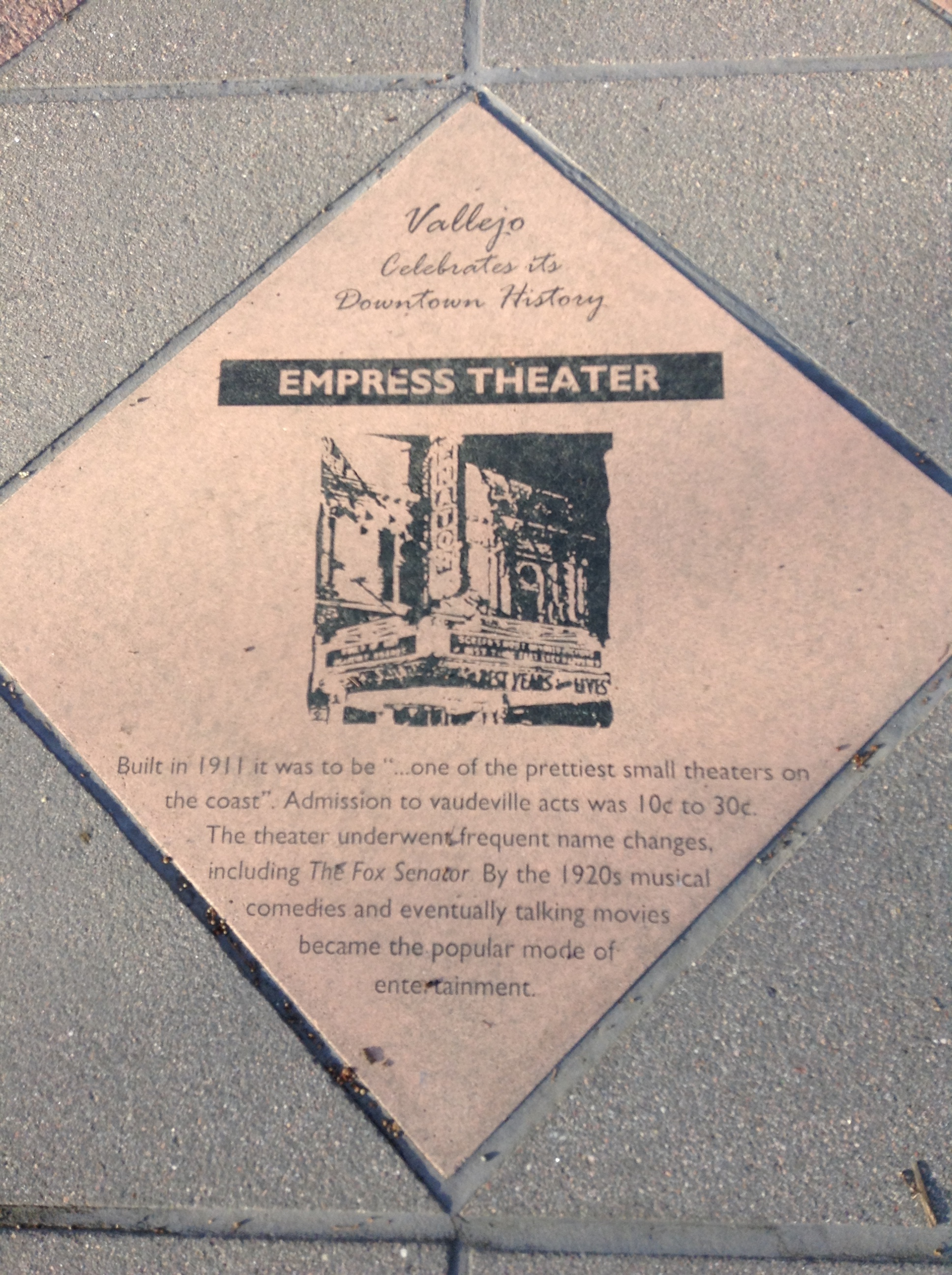
A plaque on the street about the Empress Theater in Vallejo

1952

Ray Syufy purchased the theatre and renamed it the "Crest." It was run as a single-screen movie house and closed ten years later.

1978

Between 1962 and 1978 the building experienced a period of decline and neglect. The theatre was then purchased by the Elliot family, known for their deep Vallejo roots.

=== The Empress (1980–2003) ===
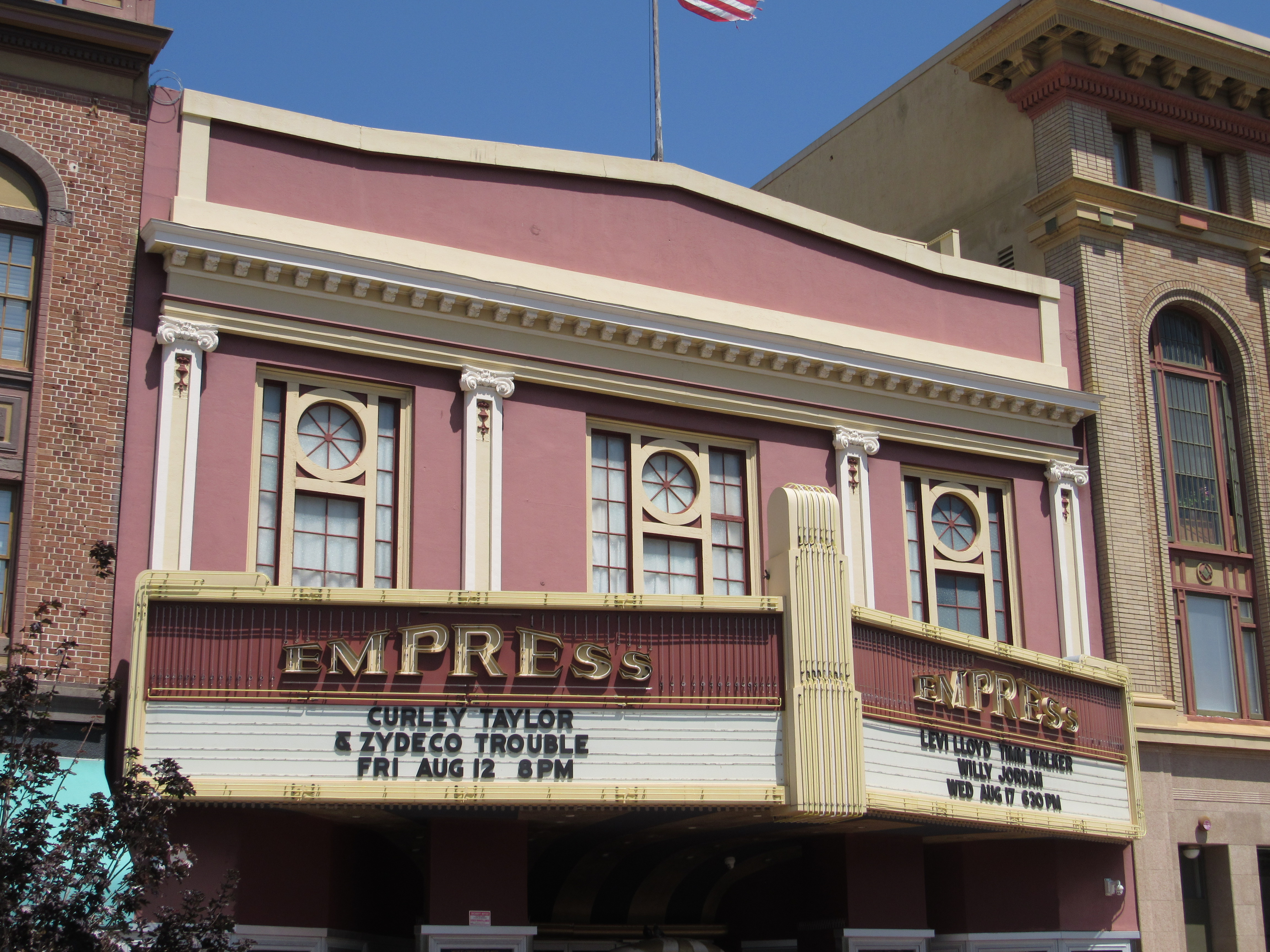
Empress Theatre building in Vallejo, California

1980

The Elliott family lovingly restored the theatre to its 1950s appearance. Its golden clouds returned along with its original name, the Empress. The building's exterior was repainted and the "Empress Theatre" sign was painted into the pediment. Its window panels were uncovered and refurbished, seats from Fox Theatres were salvaged and installed, gypsum decoration was re-gilded, and period-appropriate carpeting was laid. The Empress thrived throughout the decade.

1989

On Tuesday October 17, the Loma Prieta earthquake, measuring 6.9 on the moment magnitude scale, shook the San Francisco Bay Area; the Empress Theatre was not spared. To repair damage from the quake and make the building seismically safe for use was a task so monumental that it caused the theatre to sit vacant and derelict for nearly 20 years

1990

Empress Theatre was designated Vallejo Landmark #17.

2000-2003

The building changed hands several times between 2000 and 2003. The intervening ownership groups were Rick Sylvain and Brad Peck and subsequently Robert Litwin and Mel Gomez. Triad Communities then purchased the theatre for redevelopment in partnership with the City of Vallejo and the Vallejo Community Arts Foundation, Inc.

=== Preservation & Restoration (2004–2008) ===
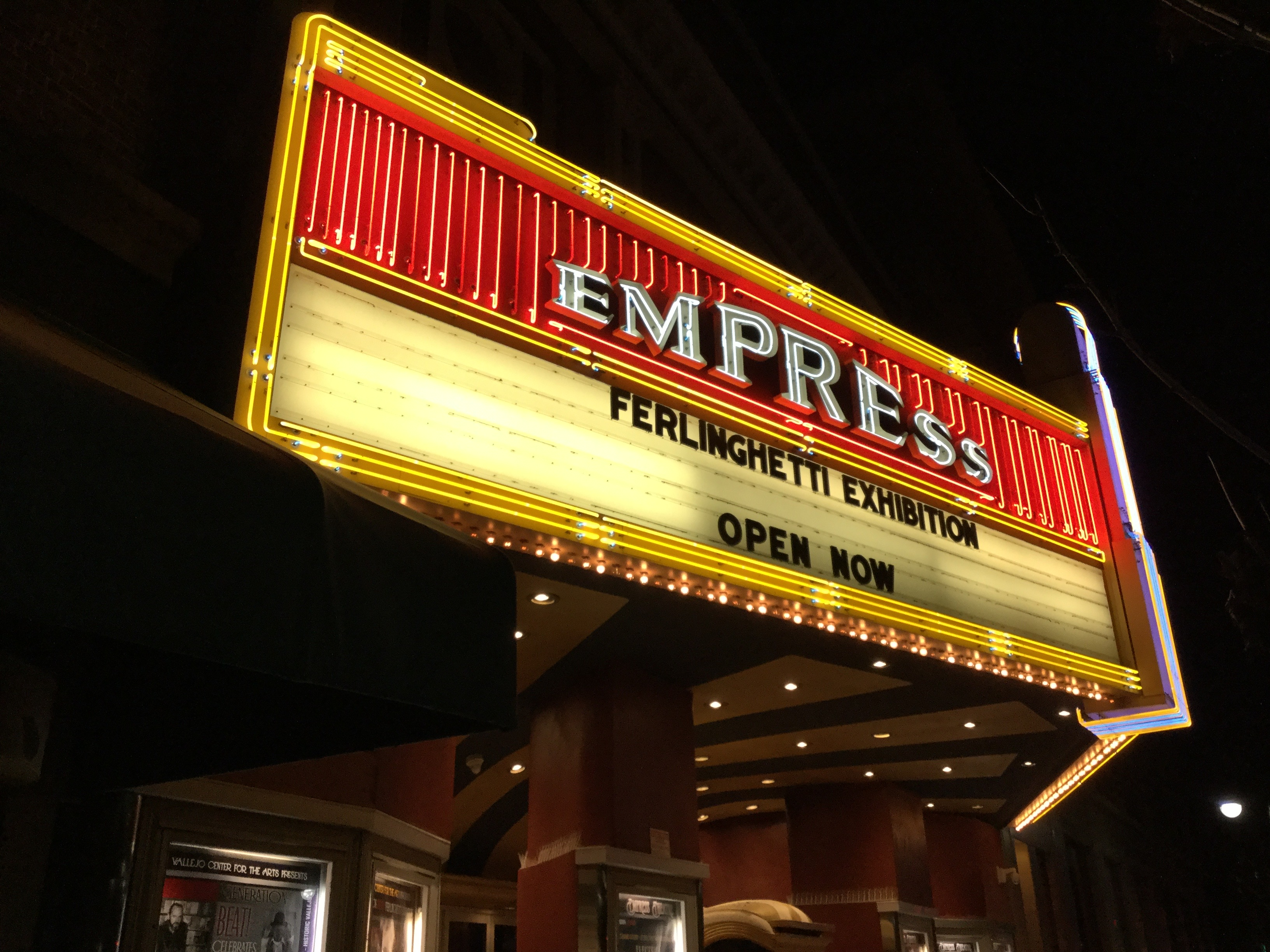
The Empress Theatre marquee in Vallejo, California during Ferlinghetti Exhibition.

2004

The Empress was purchased by Empress Theatre Associates LLC (ETA), a wholly owned subsidiary of Triad Communities LP (Triad), in a unique Public/Private partnership among the ETA/Triad, City of Vallejo and the Vallejo Community Arts Foundation (VCAF). The official groundbreaking took place in April.

2006

Under Triad's guidance, the theatre underwent a restoration consisting of a comprehensive seismic retrofit while preserving the Empress' historic character and charm. The work also included upgrades to the theater's stage design as well as heating, ventilation, and air conditioning systems. In addition, the Empress' lobby area and restrooms received extensive facelifts and the auditorium's 471 seats were replaced and more.

2007

On May 8, the new marquee was tested for the first time. On June 11, Empress Theatre Associates LLC (and Triad) received City Council approval for federal tax credits to assist with recovering some of the costs associated with the theatre renovation. National Development Council, a national non-profit organization, helped Triad obtain New Markets Tax Credits to help cover costs of the renovation.

2008

The Empress opened with a regular performance schedule in the Spring of 2008.

2014

At the completion of the federally required tax credit holding period, the ownership of the Empress will be donated to the City of Vallejo as originally envisioned.
