= The Danger Girl (1916 film) =

1916 film directed by Clarence G. Badger

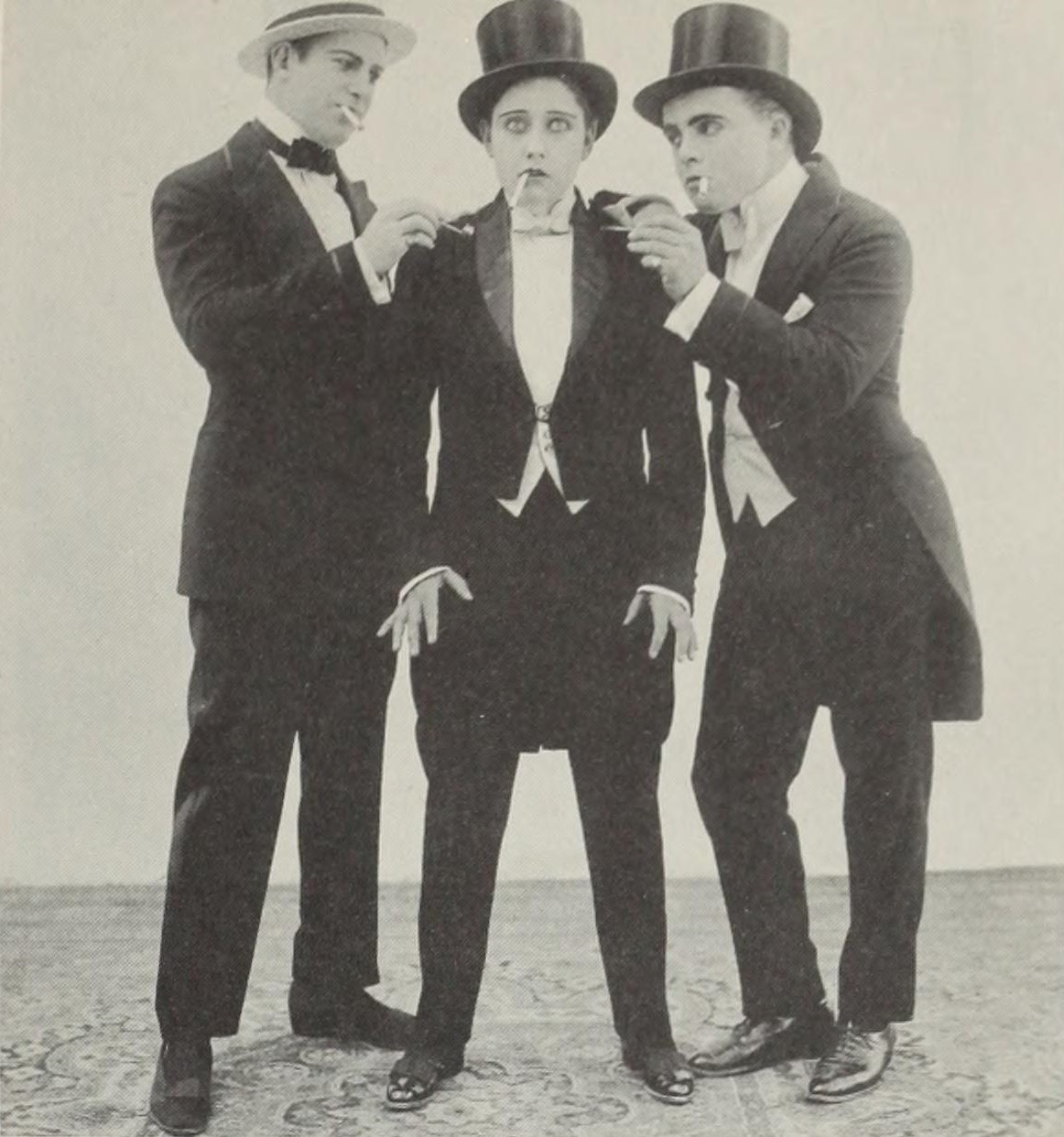
- Reggie Morris, Gloria Swanson, and Bobby Vernon in a publicity still for the film
- Directed by: Clarence G. Badger
- Produced by: Mack Sennett
- Starring: Gloria Swanson
- Production company: Keystone Studios
- Distributed by: Triangle Film Corporation
- Release date: August 25, 1916
- Running time: 18 minutes; 2 reels
- Country: United States
- Language: Silent (English intertitles)

The Danger Girl

The Danger Girl is a 1916 American silent short comedy film directed by Clarence G. Badger and starring Bobby Vernon and Gloria Swanson. The film was produced by Keystone Studios and distributed by Triangle Film Corporation.

== Plot ==
Reggie's sister disguises herself as a boy to prove to her brother and sweetheart that a vamp is only vamping them.

== Cast ==
- Gloria Swanson as Reggie's madcap sister
- Bobby Vernon as Bobby, a young gentleman
- Helen Bray as Helen, the worldly woman
- Myrtle Lind as Bobby's former sweetheart
- Reggie Morris as Reggie aka Honey Boy
- A. Edward Sutherland as Last Season's Suitor

== Preservation ==
A 35 mm print of The Danger Girl is held by George Eastman Museum, and a 8 mm reduction positive was used for several DVD releases.
