= Friend Husband =

1918 film directed by Clarence G. Badger

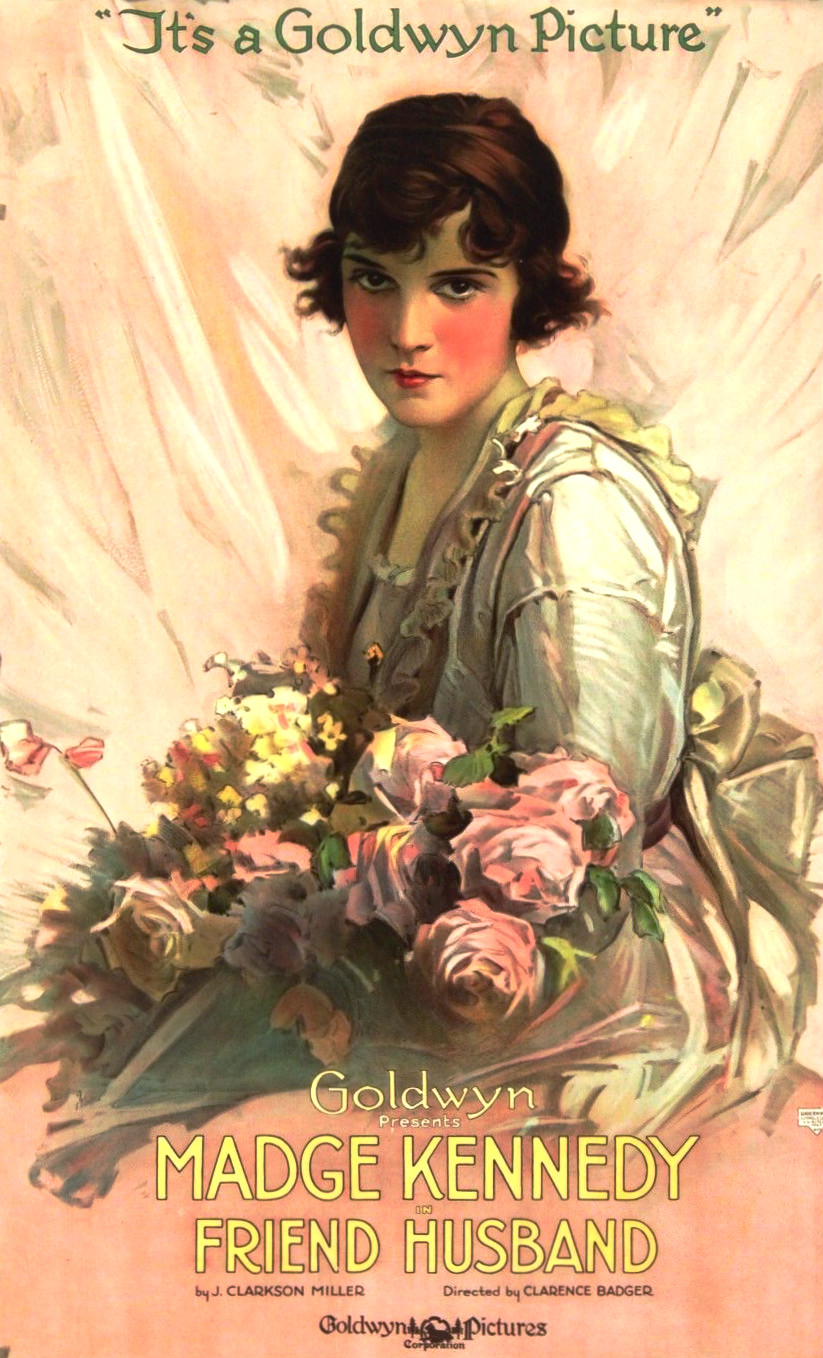
- Theatrical release poster
- Directed by: Clarence G. Badger
- Written by: Edfrid A. Bingham (scenario); Lois Zellner (story)
- Starring: Madge Kennedy; Rockliffe Fellowes
- Cinematography: Ned Van Buren
- Distributed by: Goldwyn Pictures Corporation
- Release date: August 4, 1918
- Running time: 5 reels
- Country: United States
- Language: Silent (English intertitles)

Friend Husband is a 1918 American silent comedy drama directed by Clarence G. Badger and starring Madge Kennedy and Rockliffe Fellowes. It was released by Goldwyn Pictures and features a plot about a will requiring that the heir be married.

== Plot ==
As described in a film magazine, Dorothy Dean (Kennedy), a young woman opposed to marriage, is shocked to find that under the terms of a wealthy aunt's will she is compelled to wed in order to inherit the estate. She advertises for a man who will go through the marriage ceremony and become her husband for a consideration and then leave her. Her lawyer has difficulty in obtaining a suitable young man when Dorothy mistakes Don Morton (Fellowes), a law student working in the office, for an applicant and a wedding is arranged. Don falls in love with the willful miss and kidnaps her. Leaving her at a cabin on an island, he returns to the mainland. The cabin is the rendezvous of thieves, and when Don discovers that the gang is going back to the shack he swims the river, rescues Dorothy after a hard fight with the gang and turns them over to the police. Dorothy then accepts her "husband friend" as her real husband.

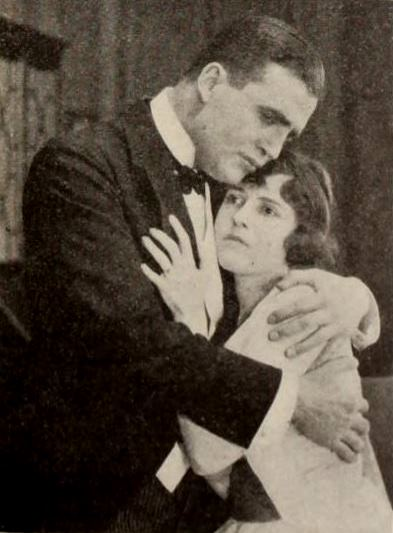
Film still

== Cast ==
- Madge Kennedy as Dorothy Dean
- Rockliffe Fellowes as Don Morton
- George Bunny as Judge Roan
- Paul Everton as Hernry Morton
- William B. Davidson as John Sparr (credited as William Davidson)
- Jean Armour as Mary Sparr
- Clifford Williams

== Preservation ==
The film is now lost.

== Reception ==
Like many American films of the time, Friend Husband was subject to restrictions and cuts by city and state film censorship boards. For example, the Chicago Board of Censors required cuts, in Reel 3, of a woman turning down the bedclothes on a twin bed, Reel 4, six scenes of a holdup of an automobile, Reel 5, thieves examining loot, and a highwayman shooting a man.
