= Distress =

Distress may refer to:

- Distress (medicine), an aversive state in which a person shows maladaptive behaviors
- Mental distress (or psychological distress)
- Distress, or distraint, the act of seizing goods to compel payment
- Distress (novel), a novel by Greg Egan
- Distress (1946 film), a 1946 French film
- Distress (1929 film), a 1929 French silent film
- Distress signal, a recognized means for obtaining help
- Distressed inventory, goods or materials whose potential to be sold at a normal cost has passed
- Distressing, the process of making an object appear aged
  - Stone washing, a similar technique used on apparel

== See also ==
- Distressor, an audio compression unit
