= Bobby Vernon =

American actor (1897–1939)

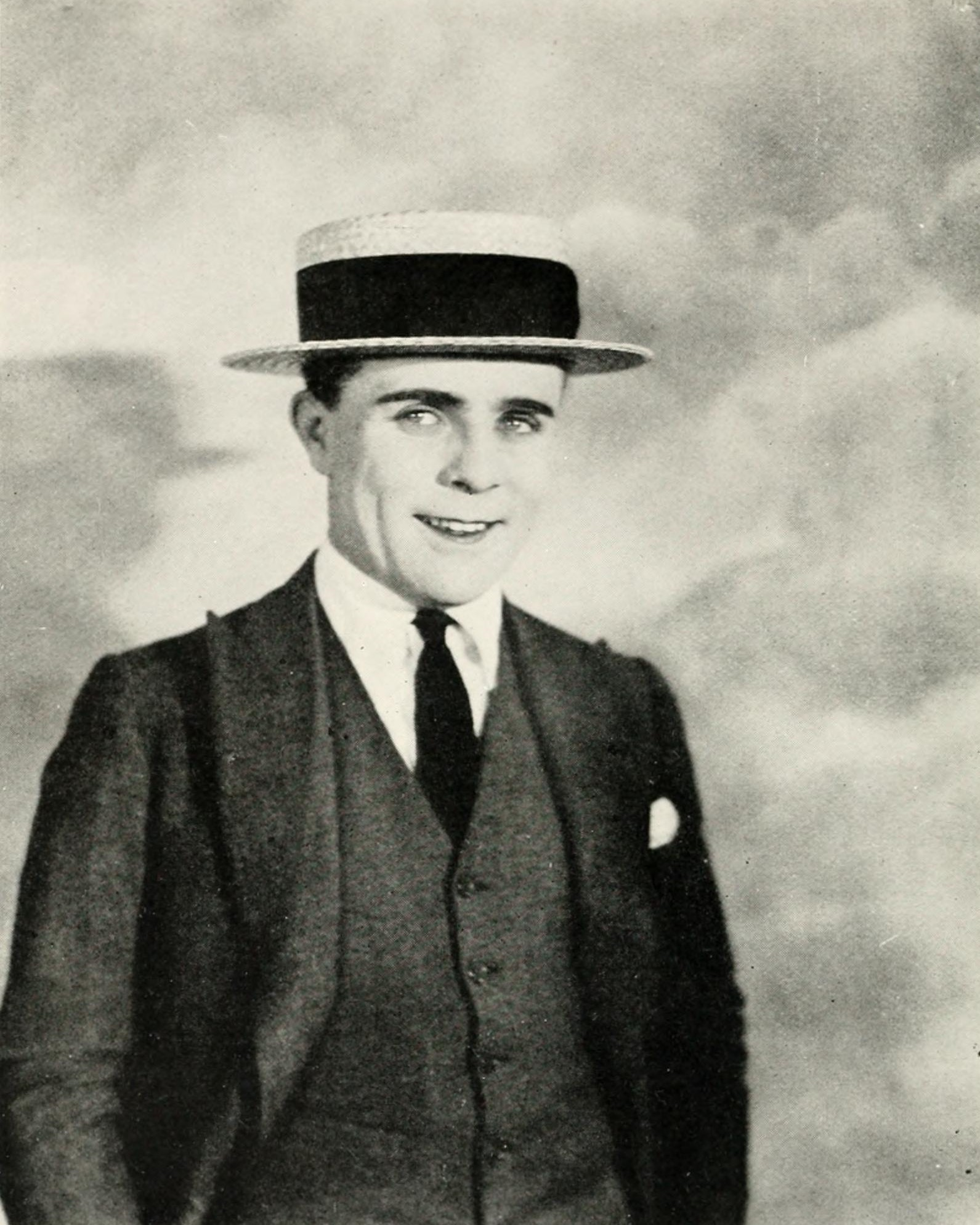
- Vernon in c. 1920
- Born: Silvian de Jardin (he legally changed his name in 1922); March 9, 1897; Chicago, Illinois, U.S.
- Died: June 28, 1939 (aged 42); Hollywood, California, U.S.
- Occupation: Actor
- Years active: 1915–1939
- Spouse: Angelina Repetto
- Children: 1

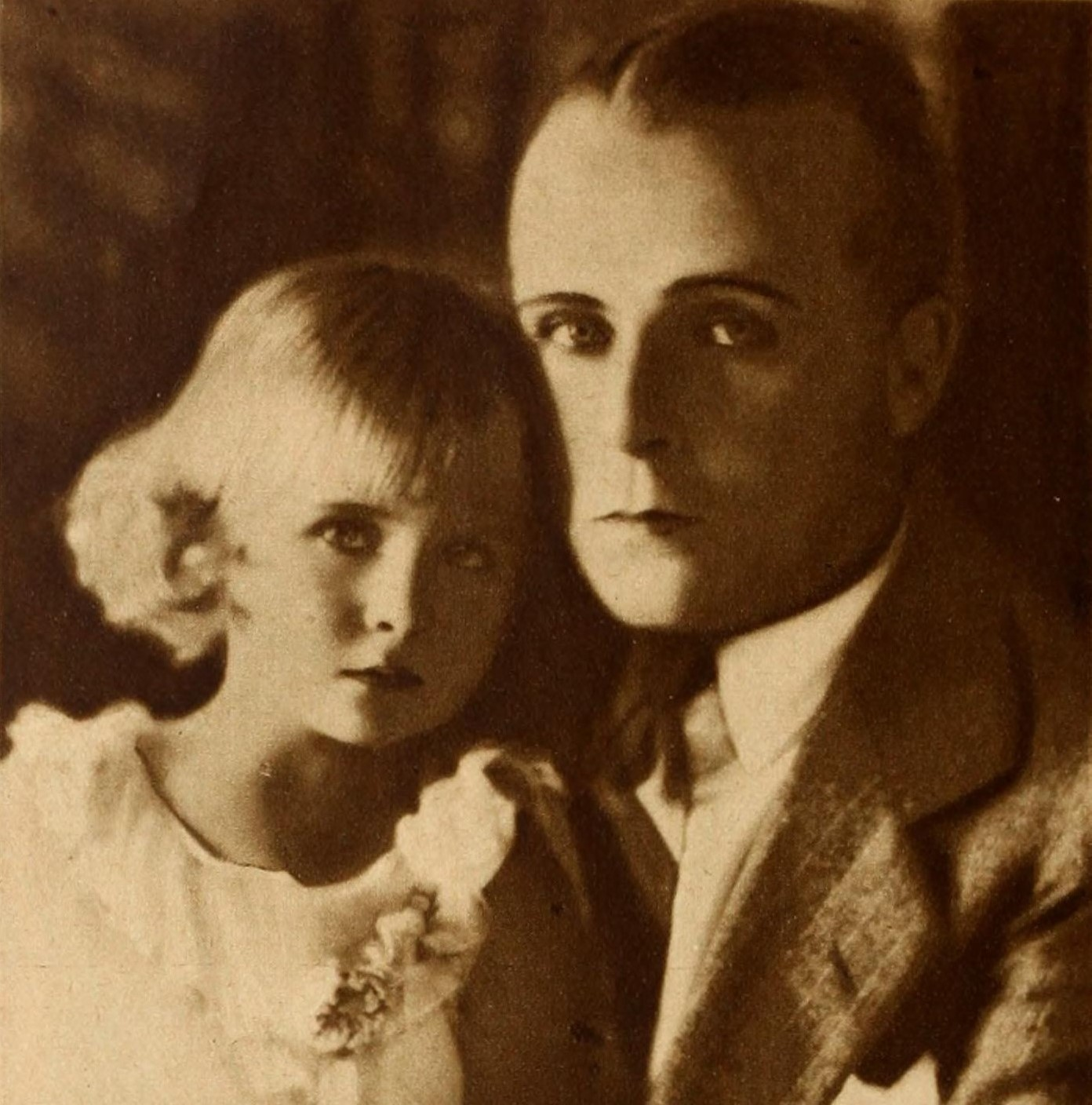
Vernon with his daughter, Barbara, c. 1929

Bobby Vernon (born Sylvion de Jardin) (March 9, 1897 – June 28, 1939) was an American comedic actor in silent films. He later became a writer and comedy supervisor at Paramount for W. C. Fields and Bing Crosby, when the sound era arrived. Blue-eyed with medium brown hair, he stood five feet and two-and-a-half inches, making him perfect for juvenile comedy roles. His comedies were popular with children.

== Life and career ==
The Chicago-born son of entertainers Harry Burns and Dorothy Vernon (born Dorothy Baird), Bobby first worked as a newsboy in San Francisco. He was known as "Buttons," the singing newsboy. Sid Grauman recognized Vernon's talent and started him singing at the Empress Theatre at the age of eleven. Later he became one of the stock actors in the vaudeville act Kolb and Dill. After three years of working with them, Max Dill broke his leg in their show "The Rollicking Girl." At the age of sixteen, Vernon replaced him for three weeks.

His first experience in screen was at the age of sixteen in Universal Studios's Joker comedies. Early in his career, he was cast as an old man. By 1915, he began working for Keystone Studios. He starred in many romantic comedies with Gloria Swanson as his leading lady. The pair became popular for their great screen chemistry. However, as director Charley Chase recalled, Swanson was "frightened to death" of her co-star's dangerous stunts. He later described his Keystone days to Motion Picture Classic:

When Gloria Swanson and I were working for Sennett, it would take sometimes two or three months to make a two-reeler. We'd rehearse for a week or so before we'd crank a camera. But the weather had something to do with it, too. You see, photography in those days wasn't what it is now and most of our scenes were exteriors. Cheaper, you know. Didn't have to build sets. If we had a call for the next day and we woke up to find it cloudy or raining, we'd just go back to bed again. And it sure can rain out here during the wet season.

In December 1917, he began working for the Christie Film Company.

On September 9, 1918, Vernon left the Christie studio to serve during World War I at the submarine base at San Pedro, Los Angeles.

Vernon's career never progressed to feature films. He was busy making two-reel comedies. In a 1929 interview, he said:

Short comedies are nerve-wracking, in addition to the chances we constantly take of receiving dangerous injuries. In the shorts there are no long shots, and the result is that we do not employ doubles. We must work fast, for our action is speeded in order to tell the story in two reels. Comedy that drags along is not real comedy. The shooting schedules on our pictures never run more than a week. It is nothing to work from eight o'clock in the morning until midnight. When I get through, comfortable slippers, a dressing gown and a newspaper look better to me than all the restaurants and theaters in the world.

A few months prior to the interview, he underwent a dangerous spine operation. The doctors claimed it was needed due to years of taking falls.

Vernon sang and danced at Grauman's Theatre to great applause in February 1930.

Vernon completed his 12-year contract with the Christie Film Company in 1929. He then began freelancing. His first sound comedy was Cry Baby, directed by Del Lord in 1930. This was not his first sound film, as he made a brief cameo in The Voice of Hollywood #3 in 1929.

In 1933, after an acting career of 19 years, Vernon turned to writing, becoming a gag man at Paramount. His last credited work in film was for Geronimo, released in 1940.

== Family ==
Vernon married Angelina Repetto (1898–1981) of St. Louis, Missouri; the couple had one child, Barbara Dorothy Vernon, born in 1922. Angelina was the sister-in-law of Reggie Morris, thus making the two men brothers-in-law.

== Death ==
Vernon died of a heart attack on June 28, 1939, in Hollywood, California, aged 42. He is interred at Forest Lawn Memorial Park in Glendale, California.

== Partial filmography ==
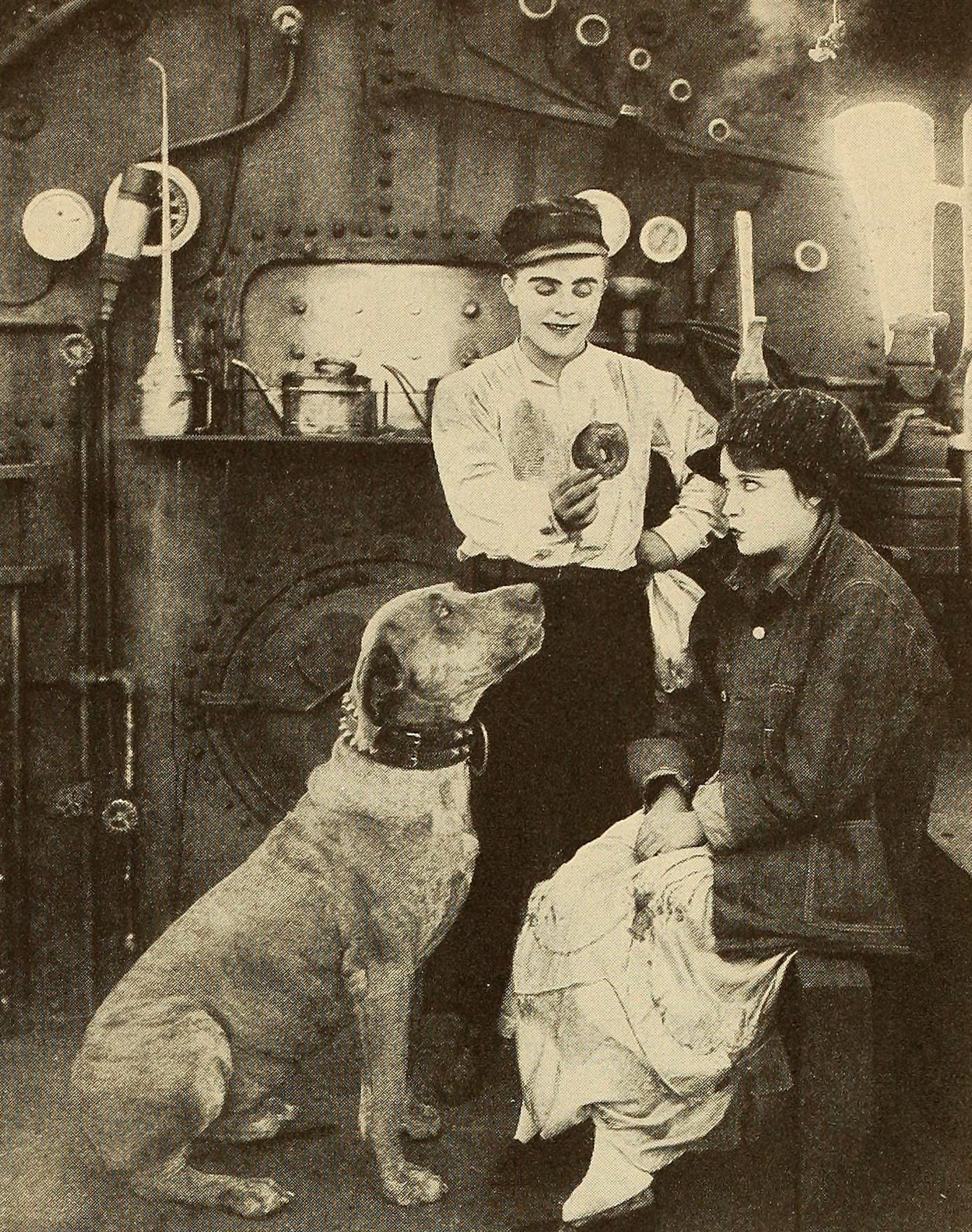
Vernon with Gloria Swanson, and Teddy the Dog in Teddy at the Throttle (1917)

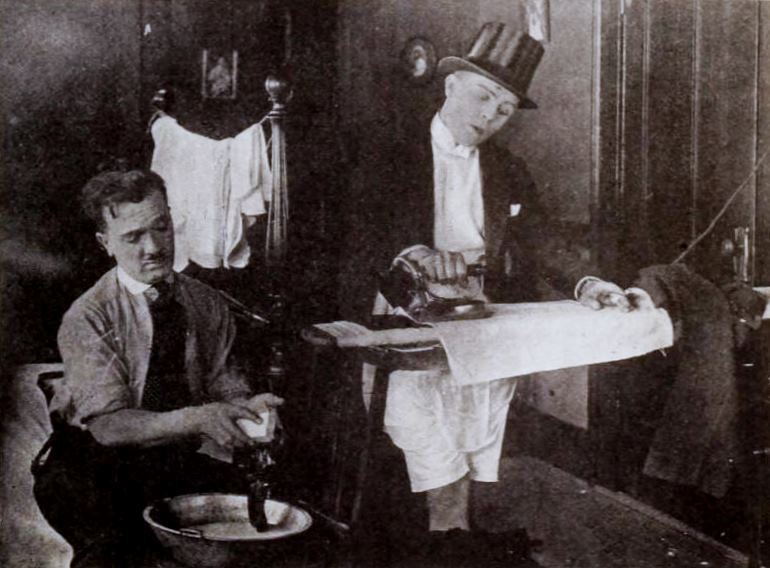
Vernon with Billy Bletcher (left) in Short and Sappy

- Mike and Jake at the Beach (1913)
- The Hungry Actors (1915)
- Fatty and the Broadway Stars (1915)
- A Dash of Courage (1916)
- Hearts and Sparks (1916)
- A Social Cub (1916)
- The Danger Girl (1916)
- Haystacks and Steeples (1916)
- Kitty from the City (1916)
- The Nick of Time Baby (1916)
- Teddy at the Throttle (1917)
- Whose Baby? (1917)
- The Sultan's Wife (1917)
- Petticoats and Pants (1920)
- Why Wild Men Go Wild (1920)
- Short and Sappy (1921)
- Fresh from the Farm (1921)
- Hey, Rube! (1921)
- Pure and Simple (1921)
- A Hickory Hick (1922)
- Choose Your Weapons (1922)
- Cornfed (1924)
- Reno Or Bust (1924)
- Broken China (1926)
- Cry Baby (1930)
- Sheer Luck (1931)
- He's a Honey (1932)
- Lone Cowboy (1933)
