= Endangered Girls =

Endangered Girls (German: Gefährdete Mädchen) may refer to:

- Endangered Girls (1927 film), a German silent film
- Endangered Girls (1928 film), an Austrian silent film
- Endangered Girls (1958 film), a West German film
