= Roxana McGowan =

American actress

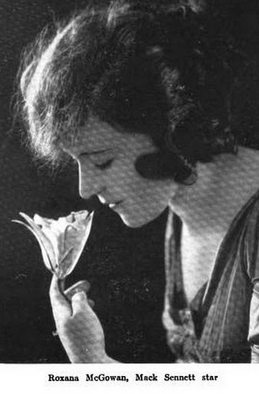
- Born: March 15, 1897
- Died: November 22, 1976 (aged 79)
- Occupation: Actress
- Years active: 1917–1919

Roxana McGowan (March 15, 1897 – November 22, 1976), born in Chicago, Illinois, was an actress in Mack Sennett comedies in the silent film era. Her screen career was brief, lasting from 1917–1919.

== Movie comic ==
Her Screen Idol (1918) stars Ford Sterling and Louise Fazenda. McGowan has fourth billing as A Society Daughter. The comedy is somewhat different than others released previously by Sennett. The motion picture satirizes the matinee idol, the character played by Sterling. He depicts an individual with small vanities who covets adulation.

McGowan more than twenty motion picture credits include Villa of the Movies (1917), The Summer Girls (1918), Two Tough Tenderfeet (1918), She Loved Him Plenty (1918), and When Love Is Blind (1919). The latter is an uncredited role.

== Marriages and family ==
McGowan's parents were Major and Mrs. L. McGowan.

McGowan was married to actor and director Albert Ray in July 1919. In 1931 she wed John M. Stahl, a noted film director. She had two children by her first marriage, Albert and Roxana. McGowan and Stahl first met at the Tiffany movie studio. Stahl was a former director at Metro Goldwyn Mayer and had been a production organizer when the company was known as Tiffany-Stahl Productions.

In 1949 McGowan resided in San Francisco, California. She hosted the wedding of her daughter, Roxana Ray Stahl, when Stahl wed Daniel Steen Fletcher, Jr., in August 1949. The marriage ceremony was conducted at St. Alban's Episcopal Church in Los Angeles, California. The wedding reception was held in Bel Air, California at the home of John Malcolm Stahl.

Roxana McGowan died in Santa Monica, California in 1976, of chronic arteriosclerosis.

== Selected filmography ==
- Are Waitresses Safe? (1917)
