= List of animal actors =

Animal actors are non-human animals that perform as characters in productions such as film, television, or theater.

== Bears ==
Image	Name	Type	Lifespan	Partial credits	Notes
	Agee	Polar bear	1995–2025	Alaska (1996); Operation Arctic (2014); The Journey Home (2014)	
	Bart the Bear	Kodiak bear	1977–2000	Jody the Bald-headed Bear in The Great Outdoors (1988); The Kodiak Bear in The Bear (1988); Bear in Legends of the Fall (1994); Bear in The Edge (1997)	
	Bart the Bear 2	Grizzly bear	2000–2021	Bear in An Unfinished Life (2005); Jerome the Grizzly Bear in Zookeeper (2011); Buster the Grizzly Bear in We Bought a Zoo (2011); Bear in Game of Thrones episode "The Bear and the Maiden Fair" (2013)	
	Brody the Bear	Kodiak bear	Born 1995	Grizzly bear in Grizzly Park (2008)	
A black and white photograph of a black bear with a chain around its neck lying on the ground as a young boy rests his head on its back and smiles.	Bruno	American black bear	1962–1981	Gentle Ben; Gentle Giant; The Life and Times of Judge Roy Bean	
A statue of Hercules the bear at Langass Woods, Isle of North Uist, Scotland.	Hercules	Grizzly bear	1975–2001	Octopussy (1983)	

== Birds ==
Image	Name	Type	Lifespan	Partial credits	Notes
	Douglass	Scarlet macaw	1967–2019	Pippi in the South Seas	
A black and white photograph of a raven standing on a wooden desk.	Jimmy	Raven	1934–c.1950s	You Can't Take It with You; It's a Wonderful Life; The Wizard of Oz	
	Mr Percival	Australian pelican	1976–2009	Storm Boy	

== Cats ==
Image	Name	Breed	Lifespan	Partial credits	Notes
A small dwarf cat with a grumpy facial expression being held in a person's arms.	Grumpy Cat (also known as Tardar Sauce)	Mixed breed	2012–2019	Grumpy Cat's Worst Christmas Ever; Lil Bub & Friendz	Also popular as an Internet meme.
A cat's face with an open mouth sticking out its tongue.	Lil Bub		2011–2019	Nine Lives; I'll Be Next Door for Christmas; Lil Bub & Friendz	Also popular as an Internet celebrity.
	Henry	Long-haired tuxedo cat	2003–2020	Henri, le Chat Noir short film series	Won the title of "Best Cat Video on the Internet" at the Internet Cat Video Festival.
A button with a picture of an orange cat's face on it. Around the cat are the words "Morris For President" and the year "1988".	Morris the Cat	Tabby cat	Died 1978	58 commercials for 9Lives (1969–1978)	Won two PATSY Awards for his performances, in 1972 and 1973.
Audrey Hepburn crouching in a white bathrobe next to an orange tabby cat with its paw on her leg.	Orangey	Tabby cat	Name used from 1950–1967	Rhubarb in Rhubarb (1951) (uncredited); Minerva in Our Miss Brooks (1952–1958, four episodes); Neutron in This Island Earth (1955); Butch in The Incredible Shrinking Man (1957); Cat in Breakfast at Tiffany's (1961); Cleopatra in The Comedy of Terrors (1964); The giant cat in Village of the Giants (1965)	Two-time PATSY Award winner, for Rhubarb and Breakfast at Tiffany's. "Orangey" was not actually one cat but rather a name used by multiple cat actors.

== Cetaceans ==
Image	Name	Type	Lifespan	Partial credits	Notes
An orca whale in an aquarium looking at the viewer through glass.	Keiko	Orca	1976–2003	Free Willy (1993)	Was re-released into the wild in 2002
A film poster depicting an orca jumping out of the water over a small boat.	Namu	Orca	Died in 1966	Namu, the Killer Whale (1966)	Was captured in Namu, British Columbia and lived at the Seattle Marine Aquarium
A dolphin without a tail in a pool of water.	Winter	Bottlenose dolphin	2005–2021	Dolphin Tale (2011); Dolphin Tale 2 (2014)	Depicted herself in the Dolphin Tale films

== Dogs ==
Image	Name	Breed	Lifespan	Partial credits	Notes
A black and white photograph of a German Shepherd laying on the ground	Ace the Wonder Dog	German Shepherd	Before 1938–after 1946	Pal in War Dogs (1942); Ace in Adventures of Rusty (1945); Ace in God's Country (1946)	
	Buddy	Golden Retriever	1988–1998	Comet in Full House (1995, 1 episode); Fluke in Fluke (1995) (uncredited); Air Bud in Air Bud (1997)	
	Brigitte	French Bulldog	Born 2010	Stella in Modern Family (2010–2012, 10 episodes) (uncredited)	Won the first Golden Collar Award for "Best Dog in a Television Series"
A line drawing of a dog's face. Above the image is text reading "The Most Wonderful Animal in the World", and below the image is text reading "Brownie the Centuries Comedy Wonder-Dog".	Brownie the Wonder Dog	Bull Terrier–Fox Terrier crossbreed		Brownie in Brownie's Little Venus (1921); Himself in Little Johnny Jones (1923)	
A Jack Russel Terrier dog sitting on a black stool and wearing a blue sequined neckerchief with a black bowtie.	Cook	Jack Russell Terrier	2000–2016	Pancho in an advertisement for the Spanish Lotería Primitiva; Valentín in Aquí no hay quien viva (2003–2006, 90 episodes); Camilo in La que se avecina (2007–2008, 14 episodes) (uncredited); Pancho in Pancho, el perro millonario (2014)	
	Cosmo	Jack Russell Terrier		Hotel for Dogs; Beginners	
	Daisy (originally named Spooks)	Cocker Spaniel-Poodle-Terrier mix	1937–1960	Daisy in the Blondie film series; Spooky in The Night of January 16th (1941); Snuffy in Fighting Back (1948); Daisy in The Valiant Hombre (1948)	
	Darla	Bichon Frisé	1975–1992	The 'Burbs; Coming to America; Pee-wee's Big Adventure; The Silence of the Lambs; Batman Returns	
A photograph of a pug's head looking upwards with its tongue sticking out.	Doug the Pug	Pug	Born 2010	The Mitchells vs. the Machines	Also popular as an Internet celebrity.
A black and white photograph of a dog standing over a fallen man holding a gun.	Dynamite the Dog			Wolf's Trail (1927); Fangs of Destiny (1927); The Call of the Heart (1928); The Four-Footed Ranger (1928); The Hound of Silver Creek (1928); The Indians Are Coming (1930)	
	Enzo	Jack Russell Terrier	1995–2010	Eddie in Frasier; Skip in My Dog Skip	Succeeded his father Moose in the role of Eddie.
	Flame	German Shepherd		My Dog Shep; Rusty film series	
	Gidget	Chihuahua	1994–2009	Taco Bell commercials (1997–2000); Bruiser's mother in Legally Blonde 2: Red, White & Blonde (2003)	
	Higgins	Mongrel	1957–1975	Dog on Petticoat Junction (1964–1970, 174 episodes) (uncredited); Benji in Benji (1974)	
	Indy	Nova Scotia Duck Tolling Retriever	born c. 2017	Himself in Good Boy (2025)	Won the award for "Best Performance in a Horror or Thriller" at the 9th Astra Film Awards, an award previously reserved for human actors, as well as numerous other awards.
A black and white portrait photograph of a Border Collie.	Jean	Border Collie	1902–1916	Jean in: Jean and the Calico Doll (1910); Jean the Match-Maker (1910); Jean Rescues (1911); Gabriel's dog in Far from the Madding Crowd (1915)	
	Jed	Wolfdog (timber wolf-Alaskan Malamute)	1977–1995	Dog Thing in The Thing (1982) (uncredited); Wolf in The Journey of Natty Gann (1985); White Fang in: White Fang (1991); White Fang 2: Myth of the White Wolf (1994) (uncredited)	
	Johnny	Mongrel	1976–?	Boomer on Here's Boomer (1980–1982, 20 episodes)	
A reddish-brown Australian Kelpie dog sitting on a red carpet.	Koko	Australian Kelpie	2005–2012	Red Dog; Koko: A Red Dog Story	
	Koton	German Shepherd	died 1991	K-9	
	Kuma von Clifford	Mongrel	2001–2018	Stan in Dog with a Blog (2012); Grandma in Mutt & Stuff (2015–2017)	
A black and white photograph of a German Shepherd raising its head and howling.	Lightning	German Shepherd		The Case of the Howling Dog; A Dog of Flanders; Blind Alibi	
A black and white photograph of an American Pit Bull Terrier with a black studded collar.	Luke the Dog	American Pit Bull Terrier	1913–1926	The Knockout (1914); Lover's Luck (1914); Mabel and Fatty's Wash Day (1915); Fatty's New Role (1915); Fatty's Faithful Fido (1915); Fatty's Plucky Pup (1915); Fatty and Mabel Adrift (1916); The Butcher Boy (1917); Coney Island (1917); The Cook (1918); The Sheriff (1918); The Hayseed (1919); The Garage (1920); The Scarecrow (1920)	
	Madison	Labrador Retriever	Born 1999	Vincent in Lost	
A black and white border collie sitting in a grassy field and looking at the viewer.	Messi	Border Collie	Born 2016	Snoop in Anatomy of a Fall	Winner of the Palm Dog Award at the 2023 Cannes Film Festival
	Moonie	Chihuahua	1998–2016	Bruiser Woods in: Legally Blonde (2001); Legally Blonde 2: Red, White & Blonde (2003)	
	Moose	Jack Russell Terrier	1990–2006	Eddie in Frasier (1993–2004, 164 episodes); Old Skip in My Dog Skip (2000)	
	Olivia	West Highland White Terrier	Born 2015	Widows; Game Night	
A black and white photograph of a Rough Collie looking to the left.	Pal	Rough Collie	1940–1958	Lassie in; Lassie Come Home (1943); Hills of Home (1948); The Sun Comes Up (1949); Challenge to Lassie (1950); Laddie in Son of Lassie (1945); Bill in Courage of Lassie (1946); Shep in The Painted Hills (1951)	
A grainy black-and white photo of child actors and a dog	Pal the Wonder Dog	American Pit Bull Terrier	1924–1930	Tige, Buster Brown's dog, in numerous films, from Educating Buster (1925) to Stop Barking (1929); Pete in Our Gang shorts; Mike the mascot in The Freshman (1925) (uncredited)	
A black and white photographs of a small pit bull terrier puppy sitting between two young boys.	Lucenay's Peter	American Staffordshire Terrier/American Pit Bull Terrier	1929–1946	Pete in Our Gang/The Little Rascals shorts	Son of Pal the Wonder Dog; after the death of his father, he took over the role in the series (though the ring is around his left eye, while his father's was around his right).
	Pete the Pup	American Bulldog	1990s–2000s	Pete in The Little Rascals (1994); Chance in Homeward Bound II: Lost in San Francisco (1996); Moocher in The Pooch and the Pauper (2000)	
A dog with grey skin and sparse white hair being held in a man's arms. The dog's tongue hangs out of its mouth.	Peggy	Pug and Chinese Crested Dog mix	Born c. 2018	Dogpool in Deadpool & Wolverine	Won the title of "Britain's ugliest dog"
	Pickles	Collie	c. 1962–1967	The Spy with a Cold Nose; Blue Peter	Also known for his role in finding a stolen FIFA World Cup Trophy
A poster with a painting of a German shepherd dog standing on a rock in a snowy environment.	Rin Tin Tin	German Shepherd	1918–1932	The Wolf-dog in Where the North Begins (1923); Rinty in: The Lighthouse by the Sea (1924); While London Sleeps (1926); The Lone Defender (1930); On the Border (1930); The Man Hunter (1930); The Lightning Warrior (1931); Lobo in The Clash of the Wolves (1925); Satan in Tracked by the Police (1927); Scotty in Tiger Rose (1929)	
A black and white photograph of a Collie next to a young girl holding a bouquet of flowers.	Shep	Collie	Died 1914	The Million Dollar Mystery (1914); Shep in: A Dog's Love (1914); Shep's Race with Death (1914); The Barrier of Flames (1914); Shep the Sentinel (1915)	
	Sanggeun	Pyrenean Mountain Dog	2004–2014	2 Days & 1 Night	
A black and white photograph of a German Shepherd's head labeled as "Silverstreak".	Silver Streak	German Shepherd	Born 1924	The Silent Flyer; Fangs of Justice; Code of the Air	
A black and white photograph of a wire fox terrier barking. White text reading "With Asta (The Pooch)" is overlayed on the image.	Skippy	Wire Fox Terrier	1931–1951	Asta in all six of the Thin Man films: The Thin Man (1934); After the Thin Man (1936); Another Thin Man (1939); Shadow of the Thin Man (1941); The Thin Man Goes Home (1945); Song of the Thin Man (1947); Mr. Smith in The Awful Truth (1937); George in Bringing Up Baby (1938); Mr. Atlas in Topper Takes a Trip (1938)	
	Soccer	Jack Russell Terrier	1988–2001	Wishbone in: Wishbone (1995–1997, 50 episodes); Wishbone's Dog Days of the West (1998)	
A black and white photograph of Brian Keith in a cowboy costume sitting with a large dog sitting in his lap.	Spike	Labrador Retriever and English Mastiff mix	1952–1962	King in The She-Creature (1956); Old Yeller in Old Yeller (1957); Patrasche in A Dog of Flanders (1959); Brown in The Westerner (1960, TV series); Pete in The Silent Call (1961)	
A black and white portrait photograph of a German Shepherd.	Strongheart	German Shepherd	1917–1929	Flash in The Silent Call (1921); Brawn in Brawn of the North (1922); Strongheart in The Love Master (1924); White Fang in White Fang (1925); North Star in North Star (1925); Strongheart in The Return of Boston Blackie (1927)	
A black and white Parson Russel Terrier dog sitting on a green carpet.	Sykes	Parson Russell Terrier	2001–2019	Midsomer Murders; Pirates of the Caribbean: The Curse of the Black Pearl; Alexander; Sweeney Todd: The Demon Barber of Fleet Street; The Other Boleyn Girl; Young Victoria; The Duchess; Prince of Persia: The Sands of Time; The Wolfman; Burke and Hare; Clash of the Titans; Snow White and the Huntsman	
A black and white photograph of a sitting Great Dane wearing bejeweled collars and a harness.	Teddy	Great Dane	c. 1910–1925	Teddy at the Throttle; Stella Maris; The Strangers' Banquet; A Boy of Flanders	
A black and white photograph at bust-length of Judy Garland as a young girl holding up a small black Cairn Terrier dog.	Terry	Cairn Terrier	1933–1945	Ready for Love (1934) (uncredited); Rags in Bright Eyes (uncredited); Rainbow in Fury (uncredited); Toto in Barefoot Boy (1938); Pet Dog in Stablemates (1938) (uncredited); Toto in The Wizard of Oz (1939)	
A black and white portrait photograph of a German Shepherd.	Thunder	German Shepherd	1921–c. 1928	Law of the Lawless; Black Lightning; Silent Pal; His Master's Voice; The Phantom of the Forest	
	Uggie	Parson Russell Terrier	2002–2015	Queenie in Water for Elephants (2011); The Dog in The Artist (2011)	Won numerous awards for his performance in The Artist, including the Palm Dog Award during the Cannes Film Festival.

== Elephants ==
Image	Name	Type	Lifespan	Partial credits	Notes
A colorless photograph of a man riding an elephant with the caption: "Charlie, Big Universal Elephant, Making Himself Useful Around Universal City."	Charlie	Asian elephant	Died 1923	Man and Beast; The Revenge of Tarzan	At the time of Charlie's death in 1923, it was claimed that he had killed five people, had appeared in over 180 films, and was over 150 years old.
An Asian elephant wearing a golden headdress with a man riding on its back.	Chirakkal Kalidasan	Asian elephant	Born 1980	Baahubali 2: The Conclusion; Punyalan Agarbattis; Dil Se..	
	Tai	Asian elephant	1968–2021	Larger than Life; Operation Dumbo Drop; Water for Elephants	

== Horses ==
Image	Name	Breed	Lifespan	Partial credits	Notes
A black and white photograph of a horse at bust length.	Bamboo Harvester	American Saddlebred/part-Arabian	1949–1970	Mister Ed in Mister Ed (1961–1966, 145 episodes)	
A black and white photograph of a young girl riding a grey horse with black spots painted on it.	Bunting	Halfbred	1961–c. 1980s	Lilla gubben in Pippi Långstrump	
	Buttermilk	Quarter Horse	1941–1972	Dale's horse in The Roy Rogers Show (1951–1956, 30 episodes)	Dale Evans' famous horse
	Cass Ole	Arabian horse	1969–1993	The Black in The Black Stallion (film) and The Black Stallion Returns	
A poster featuring a painting of a black horse rearing on its hind legs as a man dressed as a cowboy riding on its back raises his hat.	Champion the Wonder Horse			The Gene Autry Show; The Adventures of Champion	The name "Champion" was used by three different horses
	Docs Keepin Time	American Quarter Horse	1987–2013	Black Beauty in Black Beauty (1994); The Black in The Adventures of the Black Stallion	
	Popcorn Deelites	Thoroughbred	1998–2022	Seabiscuit	
A poster featuring a painting of a black horse's head.	Rex	Morgan horse	born c. 1916 or 1917	The King of Wild Horses (1924); Lightning Romance (1924); Black Cyclone (1925); The Devil Horse (1926); Wild Beauty (1927); No Man's Law ([1927); Guardians of the Wild (1928); Two Outlaws (1928); Wild Blood (1929)	
A poster featuring a painting of a black horse running in an old Western setting.	Tony the Wonder Horse		Died 1942	Rough Riding Romance (1919); Sky High (1922); For Big Stakes (1922); Just Tony (1922); Catch My Smoke (1922) (uncredited); Three Jumps Ahead (1923); Stepping Fast (1923); Soft Boiled (1923); The Lone Star Ranger (1923)	Western star Tom Mix's horse (who often received equal billing) in most of Mix's films.
A black and white photograph of a man dressed as a cowboy with his right arm around a woman in a dress and his left hand holding the reigns of a horse.	Trigger	Palomino	1934–1965	San Fernando Valley (1944); Lake Placid Serenade (1944); Don't Fence Me In (1945); Along the Navajo Trail (1945); My Pal Trigger (1946); Roll on Texas Moon (1946); Under Nevada Skies (1946); The Gay Ranchero (1948); Under California Stars (1948); Melody Time (1948); The Golden Stallion (1949); Son of Paleface (1952); The Roy Rogers Show (1951–1957, 101 episodes)	Famous as Roy Rogers' horse.

== Livestock ==
Image	Name	Species	Lifespan	Partial credits	Notes
	Charlie	Goat	Birth date unknown	Black Phillip in The Witch	

== Primates ==
Image	Name	Type	Lifespan	Partial credits	Notes
A bust-length photograph of a capuchin monkey wearing a blue shirt.	Crystal the Monkey	Capuchin monkey	Born 1994	Monkey in George of the Jungle (1997); Drunk Monkey in: Dr. Dolittle (1998) (uncredited); Dr. Dolittle 2 (2001) (uncredited); Dexter in: Night at the Museum (2006); Night at the Museum: Battle of the Smithsonian (2009) (uncredited); Night at the Museum: Secret of the Tomb (2014); Drug-dealing Monkey in The Hangover Part II (2011); Donald the Monkey in Zookeeper (2011) (uncredited); Dr. Rizzo in Animal Practice (2012–2013, seven episodes); Security in Total Dhamaal (2019)	
A black and white photograph of a chimpanzee wearing a hat, a button-up shirt, a tie, a jacket, pants, and shoes while holding a container with a strap over his shoulder.	J. Fred Muggs	Chimpanzee	Born 1952	Himself on The Today Show (1953–1975)	
Jiggs with Dorothy Lamour	Jiggs	Chimpanzee	c. 1929–1938	Cheeta (uncredited) in: Tarzan the Ape Man (1932); Tarzan the Fearless (1933); Tarzan and His Mate (1934); Nkima in: The New Adventures of Tarzan (1935); Tarzan and the Green Goddess (1938); Jiggs the chimpanzee in: Dirty Work (1933)	
	Jo Mendi II	Chimpanzee	c. 1939–1980	Performer at the Detroit Zoo's chimpanzee theater	
A black and white photograph of an orangutan with its mouth open sticking its head through metal bars. It is wearing a police hat.	Joe Martin	Orangutan	c. 1911–c. 1931	Joe Martin (orangutan) filmography	
	Jovian	Coquerel's sifaka	1994–2014	Zoboomafoo (1999–2001)	
	Kokomo Jr.	Chimpanzee		Himself on The Today Show (1957–1983)	There were at least two chimpanzees, who performed on alternate days to avoid overwork.
	Manis	Orangutan		Every Which Way but Loose; Cannonball Run II	
	Pankun	Chimpanzee	Born 2001	Tensai! Shimura Dōbutsuen (天才！志村動物園, lit. Genius! Shimura Zoo); Dōbutsu Kisō Tengai! (どうぶつ奇想天外!, lit. Unbelievable Animals!)	Retired after attacking and severely injuring a zoo staff trainee.
	Rancho	Monkey		Rancho in Raja Aur Rancho (1997–1998, 178? episodes); Katilon Ke Kaatil (1981); Mera Shikar (1988); Zahreelay (1990); Ahankaar (1995)	
	Travis	Chimpanzee	1995–2009	The Maury Povich Show; The Man Show; Pepsi commercials	It is disputed as to whether he was the same chimpanzee who acted in all of his claimed appearances.

== Reptiles ==
Image	Name	Type	Lifespan	Partial credits	Notes
	Burt	Saltwater crocodile	c. 1930s–2024	Crocodile Dundee; Rogue	
	Frank	Asian water monitor	2003–2021	Jessie; Bunk'd	
	Pocho	Crocodile	Died 2011	Touching the Dragon; Dragon's Feast	

== See also ==
- Animal training
- List of wealthiest animals
