= Shedden (surname) =

Shedden is a surname. Notable people with the surname include:

- David Shedden (1944–2017), Scotland rugby player
- Doug Shedden (born 1961), Canadian ice hockey player and coach
- Doug Shedden (politician) (1937−2020), Australian politician
- Frederick Shedden (1893–1971), Australian public servant
- George Powell-Shedden (1916–1994), Royal Air Force pilot
- Gilberto "Chito" Shedden, Costa Rican companion of the crocodile Pocho
- Gordon Shedden (born 1979), Scottish auto racing driver
- Iain Shedden (1957–2017), Scottish-born Australian musician and journalist
- John Shedden (1825–1873), Scottish-born Canadian businessman
- Roscow Shedden (1882–1956), Anglican colonial bishop
- William Ralston Shedden-Ralston (1828–1889), British scholar and translator
- Shedden family, British traders and privateers, including:
  - Robert Snedden (born c.1741), founder of the business
  - George Shedden (c.1769–1855), son of Robert
  - William George Shedden (c.1803–1872), son of George
  - Roscow Cole Shedden (c.1811–1877), son of George
  - George Shedden (died 1937)

== See also ==
- Shedden (disambiguation)
- Snedden (disambiguation)
