= The Wolf Hunters =

The Wolf Hunters may refer to:

- The Wolf Hunters (novel), a 1908 adventure novel by the American writer James Oliver Curwood
- The Wolf Hunters (1926 film), an American silent film directed by Stuart Paton
- The Wolf Hunters (1949 film), an American film directed by Budd Boetticher
