= Dynamite the Dog =

American canine actor

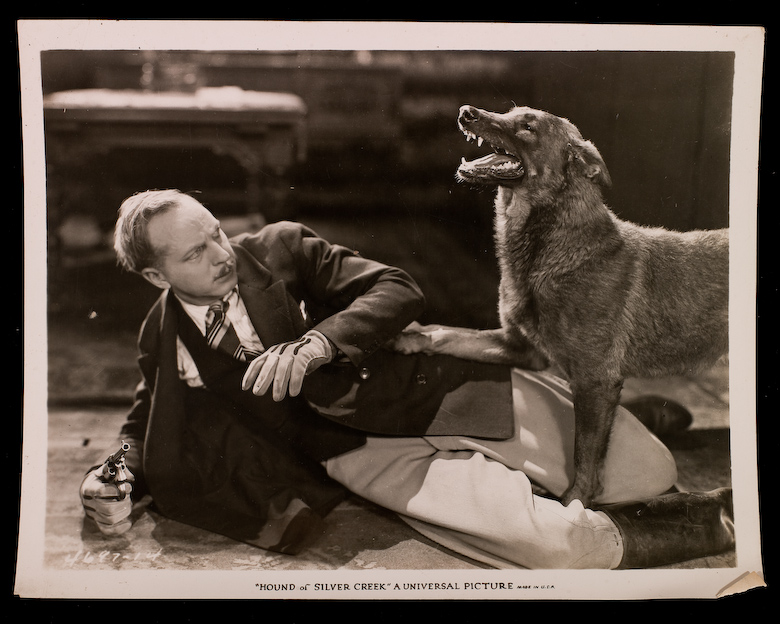
- Dynamite in The Hound of Silver Creek
- Occupation: Animal actor
- Years active: 1927–1930

Dynamite the Dog was a canine actor who starred in several Universal films in the late 1920s and early 1930s. According to some reports, he was a police dog. It is unknown what became of him after his last credited role in 1930's The Indians Are Coming.

== Selected filmography ==
- Wolf's Trail (1927)
- Fangs of Destiny (1927)
- The Call of the Heart (1928)
- The Four-Footed Ranger (1928)
- The Hound of Silver Creek (1928)
- The Indians Are Coming (1930)

== See also ==
- List of individual dogs
