= Virginia Brown Faire =

American actress (1904–1980)

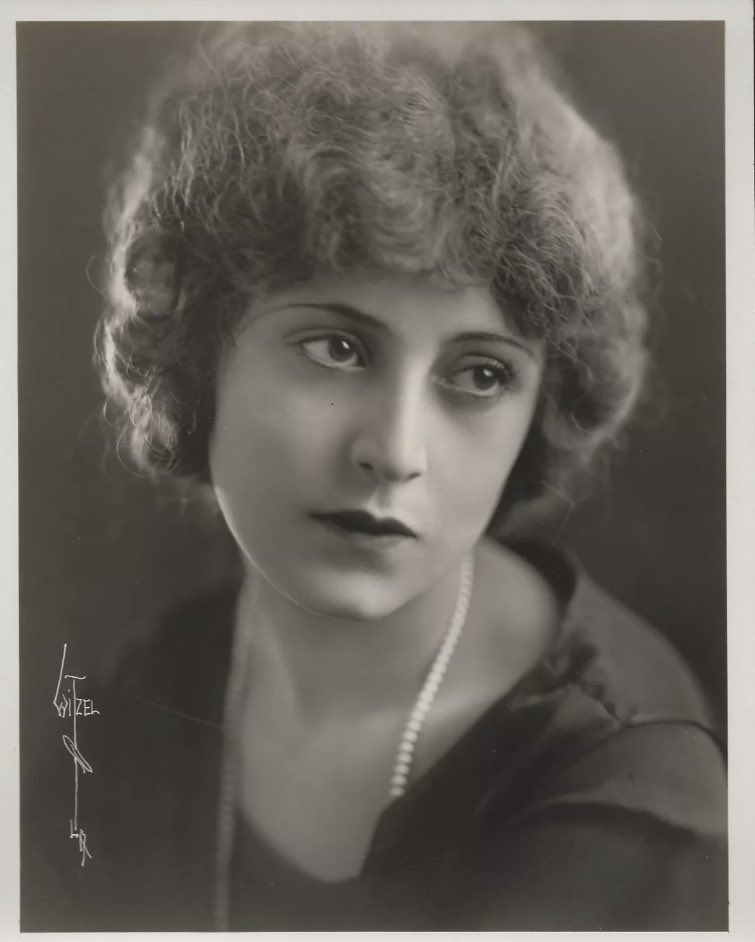
- Portrait by Albert Witzel, 1920s
- Born: Virginia Cecelia Labuna; June 26, 1904; Brooklyn, New York, U.S.
- Died: June 30, 1980 (aged 76); Laguna Beach, California, U.S.
- Other names: Virginia Faire Brown; Virginia Brown Fair; Virginia Browne Faire
- Occupation: Actress
- Years active: 1920–1935
- Spouses: Jack Doherty (m. 1927; div. 1928) Duke Worne (m. 1930; died 1933) William Bayer (m. 1935)

Virginia Brown Faire (born Virginia Cecelia Labuna; June 26, 1904 – June 30, 1980) was an American silent film actress, appearing in dramatic films and, later, in sound westerns.

== Early years ==
Virginia Cecelia Labuna was born in Brooklyn, New York, the daughter of Joseph Labuna and Martha Delsand. Other sources have her last name as La Buna. She attended Wadleigh High School for Girls.

She was brought to Hollywood in 1919 after being one of the four winners of the Motion Picture Classic magazine's "Fame and Fortune" contest, which she had entered as Virginia Brown, using her stepfather's last name. The winners later appeared in a short film, A Dream of Fair Women (1920).

== Film ==
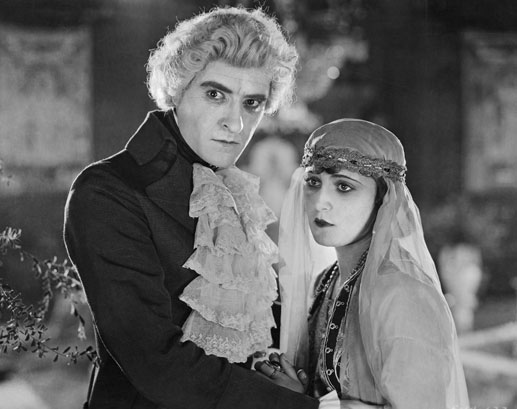
Faire with John Gilbert in Monte Cristo

Not long after she turned 15 years-old she presented herself at the Metro studio where she was almost immediately put on. Shortly after she appeared in pictures for Fox Films she was working at Universal Pictures. Between 1920 and 1935, she appeared in some 75 films. Her first film credit was the 1920 film Runnin' Straight, a Hoot Gibson short western at Universal. Faire was the leading lady of John Gilbert in Monte Cristo (1922). She was selected as one of the WAMPAS Baby Stars in 1923 and appeared with Wallace and Noah Beery in Stormswept that same year. She is most remembered for her role as Tinker Bell in the 1924 film Peter Pan.

In 1926 she had a small role in the Greta Garbo film The Temptress. She made it through the transition of sound, making a successful talkie in Frank Capra's The Donovan Affair (1929), but was soon appearing in more low-budget films. Faire appeared in several westerns, opposite Hoot Gibson, Buck Jones, John Wayne, and Ken Maynard. Faire left Hollywood for Chicago in the late 1930s. She worked in radio and several films for industries prior to retiring to the west coast.

== Personal life ==
Faire married actor Jack Dougherty on February 6, 1927. They separated in September of that year and reconciled briefly, but they separated again by April 5, 1928, and she filed for divorce on June 22, 1928.

She married director Duke Worne on January 29, 1930. Worne died in 1933. In 1935, she married furniture manufacturer William Bayer, and they remained wed until her death.

== Death ==
Faire died of cancer on June 30, 1980, in Laguna Beach, California, aged 76.

== Selected filmography ==
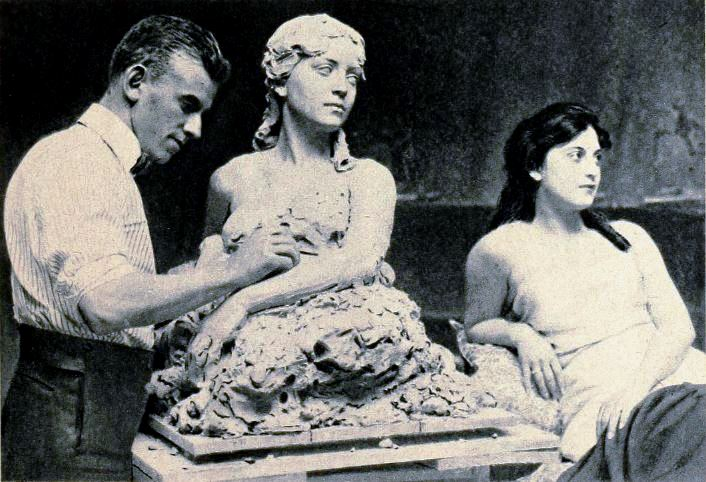
Gleb W. Derujinsky with Faire as his model in 1920

- Runnin' Straight (1920)
- Masked (1920)
- Without Benefit of Clergy (1921)
- Fightin' Mad (1921)
- Monte Cristo (1922)
- Omar the Tentmaker (1922) *unknown/presumably lost film
- Vengeance of the Deep (1923) *lost film
- Shadows of the North (1923) *lost film
- Thundergate (1923)
- Stormswept (1923)
- Romance Ranch (1924)
- The Lightning Rider (1924)
- Welcome Stranger (1924) *lost film
- Peter Pan (1924)
- The Lost World (1925)
- Friendly Enemies (1925)
- The Thoroughbred (1925)
- The Calgary Stampede (1925)
- His People (1925)
- Recompense (1925) *lost film
- Chip of the Flying U (1926)
- Wings of the Storm (1926)
- The Mile-a-Minute Man (1926)
- The Wolf Hunters (1926)
- Frenzied Flames (1926)
- Racing Romance (1926)
- The Temptress (1926)
- Broadway Billy (1926)
- Pleasure Before Business (1927)
- Hazardous Valley (1927)
- Queen of the Chorus (1928)
- A Race for Life (1928)
- The Chorus Kid (1928) *lost film
- Undressed (1928) *lost film
- The House of Shame (1928)
- Danger Patrol (1928)
- The Canyon of Adventure (1928)
- Burning the Wind (1928) *lost film
- The Devil's Chaplain (1929)
- The Body Punch (1929)
- Handcuffed (1929)
- Untamed Justice (1929)
- The Donovan Affair (1929) *film survives, but soundtrack is lost
- Murder on the Roof (1930)
- The Lonesome Trail (1930)
- Breed of the West (1930)
- The Last Ride (1931)
- Alias – the Bad Man (1931)
- Hell's Valley (1931)
- Secret Menace (1931)
- Tex Takes a Holiday (1932)
- The Lone Trail (1932)
- West of the Divide (1934)
