= Rancho (monkey) =

Indian animal actor

Rancho was an Indian monkey and animal actor, best known for his lead role as Rancho in popular TV detective series from the 1990s, Raja Aur Rancho, aired on DD Metro and had acted in more than 50 Bollywood films, including Katilon Ke Kaatil (1981), Zahreelay (1990), Mera Shikar (1988) and Ahankaar (1995).

== Selected filmography ==
Year	Film	Director(s)
1981	Katilon Ke Kaatil	Arjun Hingorani
1990	Zahreelay	Jyotin Goel
1988	Mera Shikar	Keshu Ramsay
1995	Ahankaar	Ashim Samanta

== Television ==
- Raja Aur Rancho (1997–1998), as Rancho

== See also ==
- Animals in film and television
- List of individual monkeys
