= Shedden =

Shedden may refer to:

== People ==
- Shedden (surname), notable people with the name

== Places ==
- Shedden, Algoma District, Ontario, now called Spanish
- Shedden, Elgin County, Ontario
- Coboconk, Ontario, known as Shedden in the 1870s

== Other uses ==
- Shedden massacre, a 2006 gang-related crime in Elgin County, Ontario
