= Frenzied Flames =

1926 film

- Directed by: Stuart Paton
- Written by: Barry Barringer
- Produced by: William T. Lackey
- Starring: Cullen Landis; Virginia Brown Faire; Mary Carr
- Cinematography: William H. Tuers
- Production company: W.T. Lackey Productions
- Distributed by: Ellbee Pictures
- Release date: September 1, 1926
- Country: United States
- Languages: Silent; English intertitles

Frenzied Flames is a 1926 American silent action film directed by Stuart Paton and starring Cullen Landis, Virginia Brown Faire and Mary Carr.

== Cast ==
- Cullen Landis as Danny Grovan
- Virginia Brown Faire as Alice Meagen
- Mary Carr as Mrs. Grogan
- Charles K. French as Chief Grogan
- Barry Blake as Joe Hanlan
- William Welsh as Captain Meagan
- Jack Huff as Ivory

== Bibliography ==
- Munden, Kenneth White. The American Film Institute Catalog of Motion Pictures Produced in the United States, Part 1. University of California Press, 1997.
