= Cook (dog) =

Jack Russell Terrier dog actor

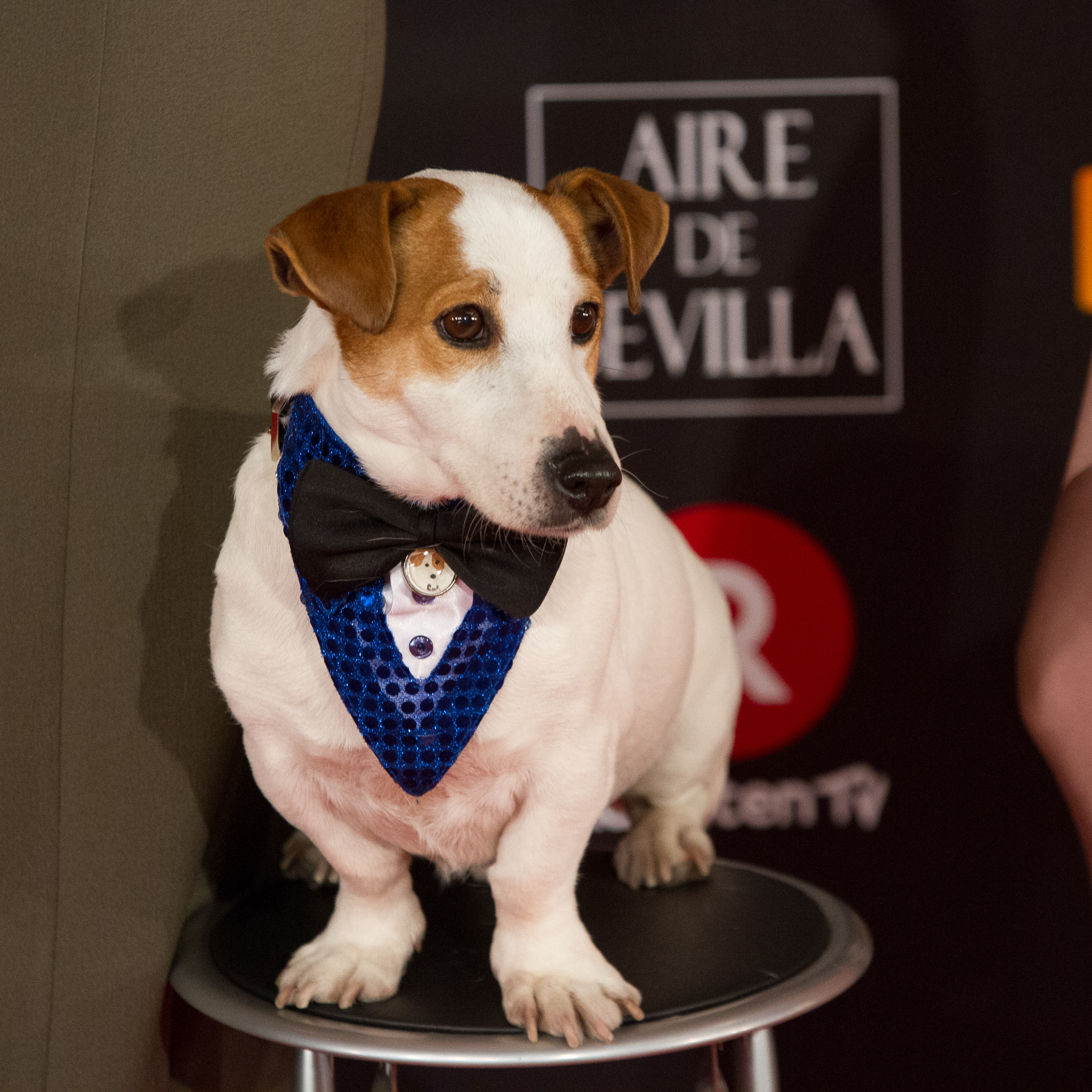
- Cook at the 32nd Goya Awards in 2018
- Species: Dog (Canis lupus familiaris)
- Breed: Jack Russell Terrier
- Born: 11 November 2000; Casteldefels, Barcelona
- Died: 19 May 2016 (aged 15)
- Occupation: Actor
- Notable role: Pancho
- Owners: Antonio Valor; Yolanda
- Mate: Turia (until 2016)
- Offspring: 6, between them Jaserte and Ramsés
- Weight: 7 kg (15 lb; 1 st 1 lb)
- Height: 0.28 m (11 in)

Cook (11 November 2000 – 19 May 2016) was a Jack Russell Terrier dog actor known for his role as Pancho in the advertisement of Lotería Primitiva of Spain, in which he earned 500 euros per day of shooting.

== Biography ==
He was born in Castelldefels, Barcelona, and his owner was Antonio Valor, his trainer, and his wife Yolanda. At the age of four months, he was sold for 70,000 pesetas and they decided to change his name to Cook (his original name was Lucke and it sounds too musical). His partner was Turia and they had several puppies; one of them, Ramsés, worked hardly. He first worked when he was only six months. Due to Loterías y Apuestas del Estado being sold to Goya Awards, Cook attended the 24th Goya Awards.

In 2003, he played Valentín in the TV series Aquí no hay quien viva, which is the mate of Vicenta Benito (Gemma Cuervo).

In August 2014, Cook starred in his first film with the production company Atresmedia Cine, titled Pancho, el perro millonario, in the role of Pancho.

He died on 19 May 2016 of cardiac arrest aged 15.

His son Ramsés starred in 2018 the television series Sabuesos.

== Awards ==
The advertising campaign he worked on was awarded the Gran AMPE de Oro and the Premio a la Excelencia Publicitaria, given by Museo Reina Sofía.

== See also ==
- List of individual dogs
