= Burning the Wind =

1928 film

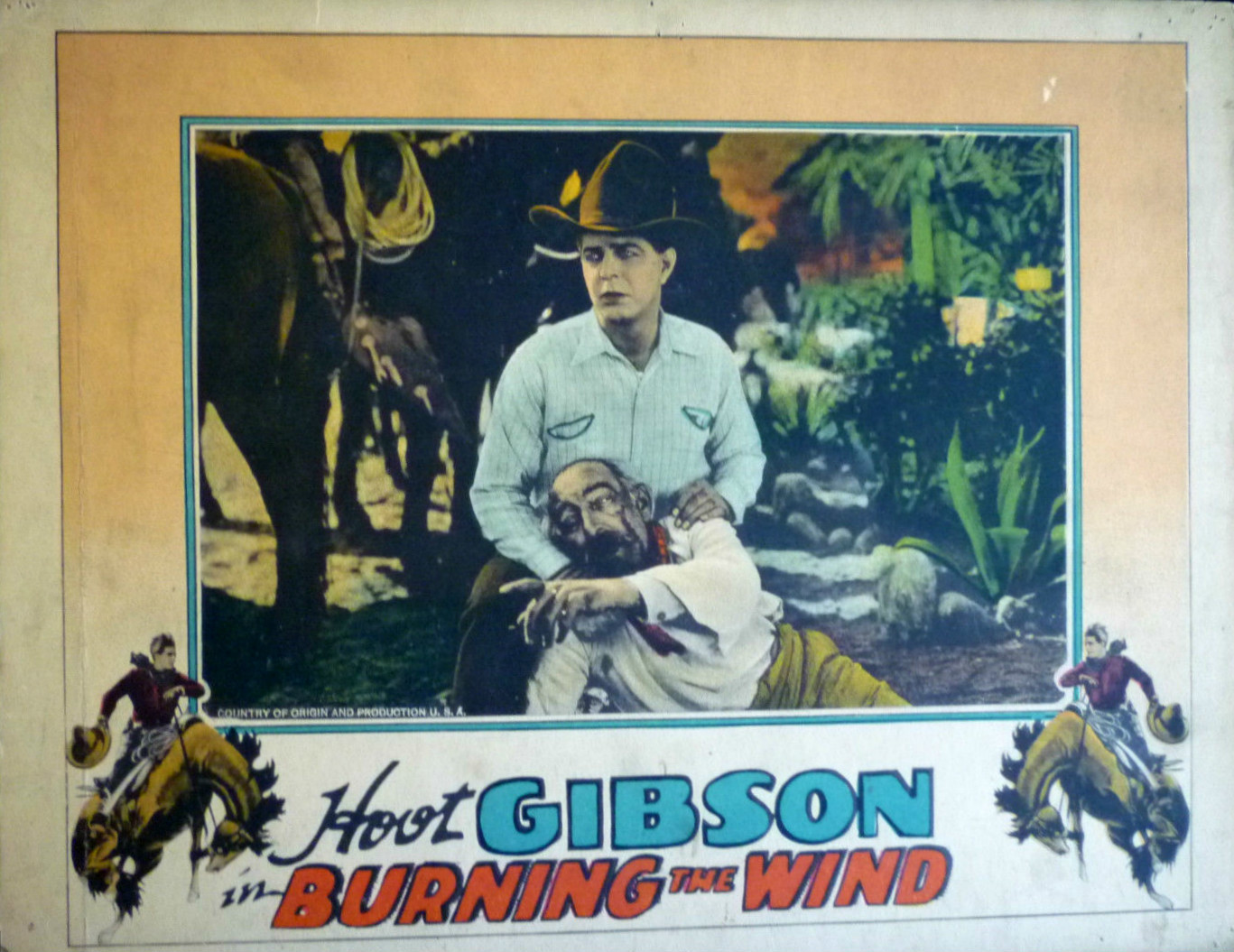
- Lobby card
- Directed by: Herbert Blaché; Henry MacRae
- Written by: Gardner Bradford; George H. Plympton; Raymond L. Schrock
- Based on: A Daughter of the Dons by William MacLeod Raine
- Produced by: Hoot Gibson
- Starring: Hoot Gibson; Virginia Brown Faire
- Cinematography: Harry Neumann; Ray Ramsey
- Edited by: Tom Malloy
- Distributed by: Universal Pictures
- Release dates: October 26, 1928 (New York Premiere); February 10, 1929 (Nationwide release)
- Running time: 60 minutes
- Country: United States
- Language: Silent (English intertitles)

Burning the Wind is a 1928 American romantic drama film, directed by Herbert Blaché and Henry MacRae, starring Hoot Gibson and featuring Boris Karloff. The film is considered to be lost.

== Cast ==
- Hoot Gibson as Richard Gordon Jr.
- Virginia Brown Faire as Maria Valdez
- Cesare Gravina as Don Ramón Valdez
- Boris Karloff as Pug Doran
- Gilbert Holmes as Peewee (credited as Pee Wee Holmes)
- Robert Homans as Richard Gordon Sr.
- George Grandee as Manuel Valdez

== See also ==
- Hoot Gibson filmography
- Boris Karloff filmography
