= The Chorus Kid =

1928 film by Howard Bretherton

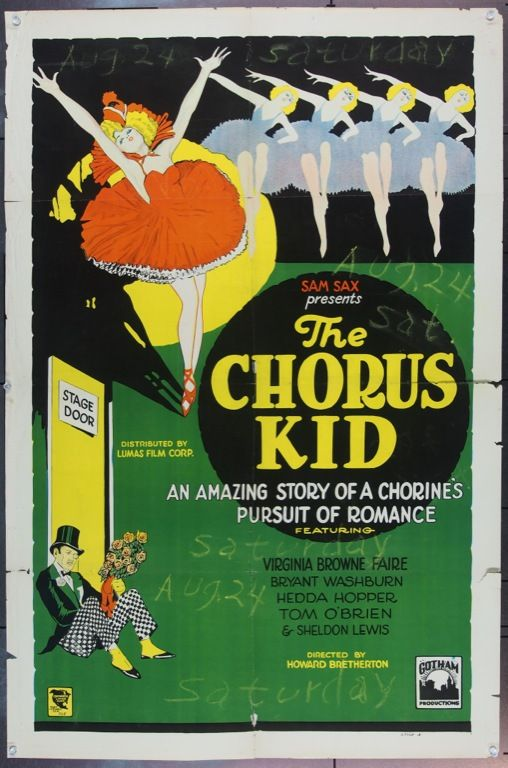
- Directed by: Howard Bretherton
- Written by: Harold Shumate(scenario); Adele Buffington(adaptation); Howard Rockey(story); Casey Robinson(titles)
- Produced by: Gotham Productions
- Starring: Virginia Brown Faire; Bryant Washburn
- Cinematography: Charles Van Enger
- Edited by: W. Donn Hayes
- Distributed by: Lumas Film
- Release date: April 10, 1928
- Running time: 6 reels
- Country: United States
- Language: Silent...English titles

The Chorus Kid is a lost 1928 silent film comedy drama directed by Howard Bretherton and starring Virginia Brown Faire and Bryant Washburn. It was produced and released by independentsts Gotham Productions and Lumas Film respectively.

== Cast ==
- Virginia Brown Faire as Beatrice Brown
- Bryant Washburn as John Powell
- Thelma Hill as Peggy Powell
- Hedda Hopper as Mrs. Garrett
- John Batten as Jimmy Garrett
- Tom O'Brien as Bill Whipple
- Sheldon Lewis as Jacob Feldman
