= Kuma von Clifford =

Dog actor

- Species: Dog
- Breed: Mutt with Golden Retriever, Husky and Australian Shepherd
- Born: December 15, 2001; Southern California
- Died: November 21, 2018 (aged 16)
- Occupation: Dog actor
- Owner: Sarah Clifford

Kuma von Clifford (December 15, 2001 – November 21, 2018) was an American dog actor. With a career spanning from 2005 to 2017, the dog appeared in several films and starred as the original title character in the Disney Channel television series Dog with a Blog, as well as the character of Grandma on the Nickelodeon series Mutt & Stuff.

Kuma was a lifelong resident of Southern California, where he was raised by Sarah Clifford. Kuma was a mutt, with Golden Retriever, Husky and Australian Shepherd lineage. Kuma died in late November 2018 as the result of a stroke, shortly before his 17th birthday.

== See also ==
- List of individual dogs
