= The Four-Footed Ranger =

1928 film

- Directed by: Stuart Paton
- Screenplay by: Cromwell Kent; Paul M. Bryan; Gardner Bradford
- Story by: Paul M. Bryan
- Starring: Dynamite the Dog; Edmund Cobb; Margerie Bonner; Pearl Sindelar; Francis Ford; Patrick Rooney
- Cinematography: Jerome Ash
- Edited by: Tom Malloy
- Production company: Universal Pictures
- Distributed by: Universal Pictures
- Release date: March 25, 1928
- Running time: 60 minutes
- Country: United States
- Languages: Silent; English intertitles

The Four-Footed Ranger is a 1928 American silent Western film directed by Stuart Paton and written by Cromwell Kent, Paul M. Bryan and Gardner Bradford. The film stars Dynamite the Dog, Edmund Cobb, Margerie Bonner, Pearl Sindelar, Francis Ford and Patrick Rooney. The film was released on March 25, 1928, by Universal Pictures.

== Cast ==
- Dynamite the Dog as Dynamite
- Edmund Cobb as Jack Dunne
- Margerie Bonner as Katy Pearl Lee
- Pearl Sindelar as Mary Doolittle
- Francis Ford as Brom Hockley
- Patrick Rooney as Bull Becker
- Frank Clark as Handsome Thomas
- Carl Sepulveda as Jake
- Lee Lin as Cook
