= Kokomo Jr. =

Performing chimpanzee

Kokomo Jr. was the name given to at least two male common chimpanzees used as animal actors, one born c. 1955 and one born c. 1967. Kokomo Jr. replaced J. Fred Muggs as the animal mascot of the Today Show in 1957, and was known for his ability to "talk", being able to pronounce the word mama on demand. Kokomo Jr. was retired in 1983.

== Early life ==
Kokomo Jr.'s handler, Nick Carrado was a stage magician who discovered him while touring at an animal farm in Cape Cod circa 1956. The name was created by combining the names of two of his army friends, Coco and Moe. Carrado initially used Kokomo Jr. as part of his magic act and taught him to perform simple stage illusions.

== Television career ==
While touring in Florida, Carrado learned that the producers of Today were looking for a new ape. Carrado brought Kokomo Jr. to audition, and the chimpanzee was hired to be the show's mascot. For two years, Kokomo Jr. was used to present weather forecasts and perform short sketches. Kokomo Jr. also appeared on television shows including The Tonight Show, What's My Line, I've Got A Secret, To Tell The Truth, The Price Is Right and Candid Camera.

== Personal life ==
In 1957, Kokomo Jr. was named an honorary citizen of Kokomo, Indiana. In 1972, The New York Times described Kokomo Jr. as a "5-year‐old, 2½-foot-tall, 65-pound chimp", and revealed that there had been a previous chimpanzee with the same name. Carrado used two different chimpanzees working on alternating days to prevent either one becoming too exhausted. Kokomo Jr. lived with Carrado in New York City, with publicity claiming that Kokomo Jr. had a pet dog that he cared for himself. After Carrado retired Kokomo Jr. in 1983, the chimpanzees lived with Carrado in North Carolina.

== See also ==
- List of individual apes
