= Agee (bear) =

Female polar bear (1995–2025)

- Species: Polar bear
- Sex: Female
- Born: January 3, 1995; Kolmården Wildlife Park
- Died: June 15, 2025 (aged 30); Assiniboine Park Zoo
- Occupation: Animal actor

Agee (January 3, 1995 – June 15, 2025) was a female polar bear best known for her appearances in films, including Alaska (1996), Operation Arctic (2014), and The Journey Home (2014). She was the only trained polar bear in North America.

Agee was born in the Kolmården Wildlife Park in Sweden on January 3, 1995. One month later she was acquired by Beyond Bears in Abbotsford, British Columbia. She lived with these private owners for most of her life before being moved to the Assiniboine Park Zoo in 2022. She was not made visible to visitors, instead being kept in a personal space intended to keep her comfortable in her old age. In 2025, she developed age-related health issues such as kidney failure, dental problems, and mobility issues. She died on June 15, 2025.

== See also ==
- List of individual bears
- List of animal actors
