= Wolf's Trail =

1927 film

- Directed by: Francis Ford
- Written by: Gardner Bradford; Basil Dickey
- Produced by: Carl Laemmle
- Starring: Edmund Cobb; Dixie Lamont; Joseph Bennett
- Cinematography: Jerome Ash
- Production company: Universal Pictures
- Distributed by: Universal Pictures
- Release date: October 2, 1927
- Running time: 50 minutes
- Country: United States
- Languages: Silent (English intertitles)

Wolf's Trail is a 1927 American silent Western film directed by Francis Ford and starring Edmund Cobb, Dixie Lamont and Joseph Bennett. The film is preserved at the David Bradley Film Collection at Indiana University.

== Synopsis ==
A Texas Ranger battles against smugglers on the Mexico border. He goes undercover to round up the gang.

== Cast ==
- Edmund Cobb as Captain Tom Grant
- Dixie Lamont as Jane Drew
- Edwin Terry as Simeon Kraft
- Joseph Bennett as Bert Farrel
- Dynamite the Dog as Dynamite

== Bibliography ==
- Langman, Larry. A Guide to Silent Westerns. Greenwood Publishing Group, 1992.
