= Alaska (1996 film) =

1996 film by Fraser Clarke Heston

- Theatrical release poster
- Directed by: Fraser Clarke Heston
- Written by: Andy Burg; Scott Myers
- Produced by: Carol Fuchs; Andy Burg
- Starring: Thora Birch; Vincent Kartheiser; Dirk Benedict; Charlton Heston
- Cinematography: Tony Westman
- Edited by: Rob Kobrin
- Music by: Reg Powell
- Production companies: Columbia Pictures; Castle Rock Entertainment; Fuchs/Burg Productions
- Distributed by: Sony Pictures Releasing
- Release date: August 14, 1996
- Running time: 109 minutes
- Country: United States
- Language: English
- Budget: $24 million
- Box office: $11,829,959

Alaska is a 1996 American adventure survival film directed by Fraser Clarke Heston, and produced by Carol Fuchs and Andy Burg. The story, written by Burg and Scott Myers, follows two children befriending and accompanying a polar bear, while finding and saving their father through the Alaskan wilderness. However, a poacher with a desire to capture the bear follows close behind the children and the polar bear. The director's father, Charlton Heston, plays the main antagonist. The movie was filmed primarily in the Purcell Mountains of British Columbia in Canada and the city of Vancouver. Alaska was released by Sony Pictures Releasing on August 14, 1996. The film was a box office bomb, grossing only $11,829,959 against a $24 million budget. It received negative reviews upon its release.

== Plot ==
A widowed pilot named Jake Barnes is flying a plane over the Alaskan wilderness delivering toilet paper on behalf of an air company. Meanwhile, a female polar bear cub and her mother play in the snow, watched by poachers Colin Perry and Mr. Koontz. The mother bear is killed by Perry while the cub is captured and put into a cage, as Perry intends to sell her alive to a client in Hong Kong for a fortune.

Jake's daughter Jessie and her friend Chip observe wildlife in their kayaks before heading home. As Jake lands, he meets up with his son Sean, who got caught for spilling oil on the deck. Sean is taking out his frustrations over the family's move to Alaska following his mother's death. Jake is assigned to make an emergency run at Douglas, but his plane's engines stall, causing him to lose control and crash close to Devils Thumb. Frustrated by the lack of search effort by the police, Sean and Jessie go out to find their father on their own.

As they kayak through the Gulf of Alaska, they pull up to shore, where they find a camp belonging to Perry and Koontz. Discovering the cub locked inside a cage, the kids set it free before they all escape. Upon returning to the camp, Perry and Koontz learn that the cub has escaped, and Perry decides to recapture her despite Koontz's objections.

The next day, Jessie and Sean search on foot while the polar bear cub follows them. Perry and Koontz are also on the kids' trail, deducing that the cub is following them. Just as Charlie is arriving in his helicopter, Perry and Koontz hide the kids' kayak while giving Charlie a piece of the oar in hopes of sending him on a wild-goose chase.

After going through a mountain drop, the kids take refuge inside an old rusty cabin before taking a canoe to continue their search down a river. However, they lose their canoe in a waterfall, though they are rescued by their Alaskan Native friends Chip and his grandfather Ben. Chip's father wants to send Jessie and Sean home, but Ben and Chip wish to help the two on their journey. Sean and Jessie proceed on their quest with the polar bear cub, whom Sean nicknamed Cubby, by their side. In the meantime, Charlie finds the poachers' camp and reports it to the police before heading back to Devils Thumb, realizing that Perry and Koontz lied to him.

Eventually, Cubby leads the children close to Devils Thumb, but Perry and Koontz ambush them with their helicopter before tranquilizing Cubby. Loading the cub into the helicopter, Perry and Koontz fly away, but as Koontz did not load the dart with enough tranquilizer fluids, Cubby wakes up and gets into a scuffle with Perry. As Koontz inadvertently lowers the helicopter, Cubby bites Perry's right knee, causing Perry to accidentally shoot Koontz with a tranquilizer dart and disable the helicopter's controls. As Cubby escapes back to Devils Thumb, Sean and Jessie stumble upon wreckage from the plane crash and locate their father after he fires a flare.

Jessie lowers Sean down the side of the mountain to reach Jake. Cubby comes to the rescue by helping Jessie pull the rope to reel Jake and Sean back to safety. As the Barnes family is reunited, Charlie shows up to complete the rescue after Sean fires another flare to alert him of their location. In the meantime, Perry and Koontz trek on foot after their helicopter is disabled, upset that they have lost Cubby and that they will possibly be tracked down by the authorities. Charlie and the Barnes family then return Cubby to the Arctic National Wildlife Refuge, where she meets up with a new bear family.

== Cast ==
- Thora Birch as Jessie Barnes
- Vincent Kartheiser as Sean Barnes
- Dirk Benedict as Jake Barnes
- Charlton Heston as Colin Perry
- Duncan Fraser as Mr. Koontz
- Gordon Tootoosis as Ben
- Ben Cardinal as Charlie
- Ryan Kent as Chip
- Don S. Davis as Sergeant Sam Grazer
- Dolly Madsen as Mrs. Ben
- Stephen E. Miller as Trooper Sam Harvey
- Byron Chief-Moon as Chip's Father
- Kristin Lehman as Florence
- Adrien Dorval as Burly Fisherman
- Agee as Cubby

== Reception ==
=== Box office ===
The film managed to bring in US domestic revenues of only $11,829,959 against a production budget of $24 million.

=== Critical response ===
On Rotten Tomatoes, the film has an approval rating of 17% based on reviews from 13 critics, with an average of 4.70 out of 10.

In his review for Variety, Emanuel Levy commented, "Beautiful vistas, Thora Birch and a cute bear can't compensate for the routine story and sloppy direction of this old-fashioned family adventure"; while Jeff Vice of the Deseret News criticised the film for featuring "bad performances, an awful script straight out of a TV movie [and] one of the least appealing, most irritating young heroes in recent screen history."
