= Stuart Paton =

English screenwriter

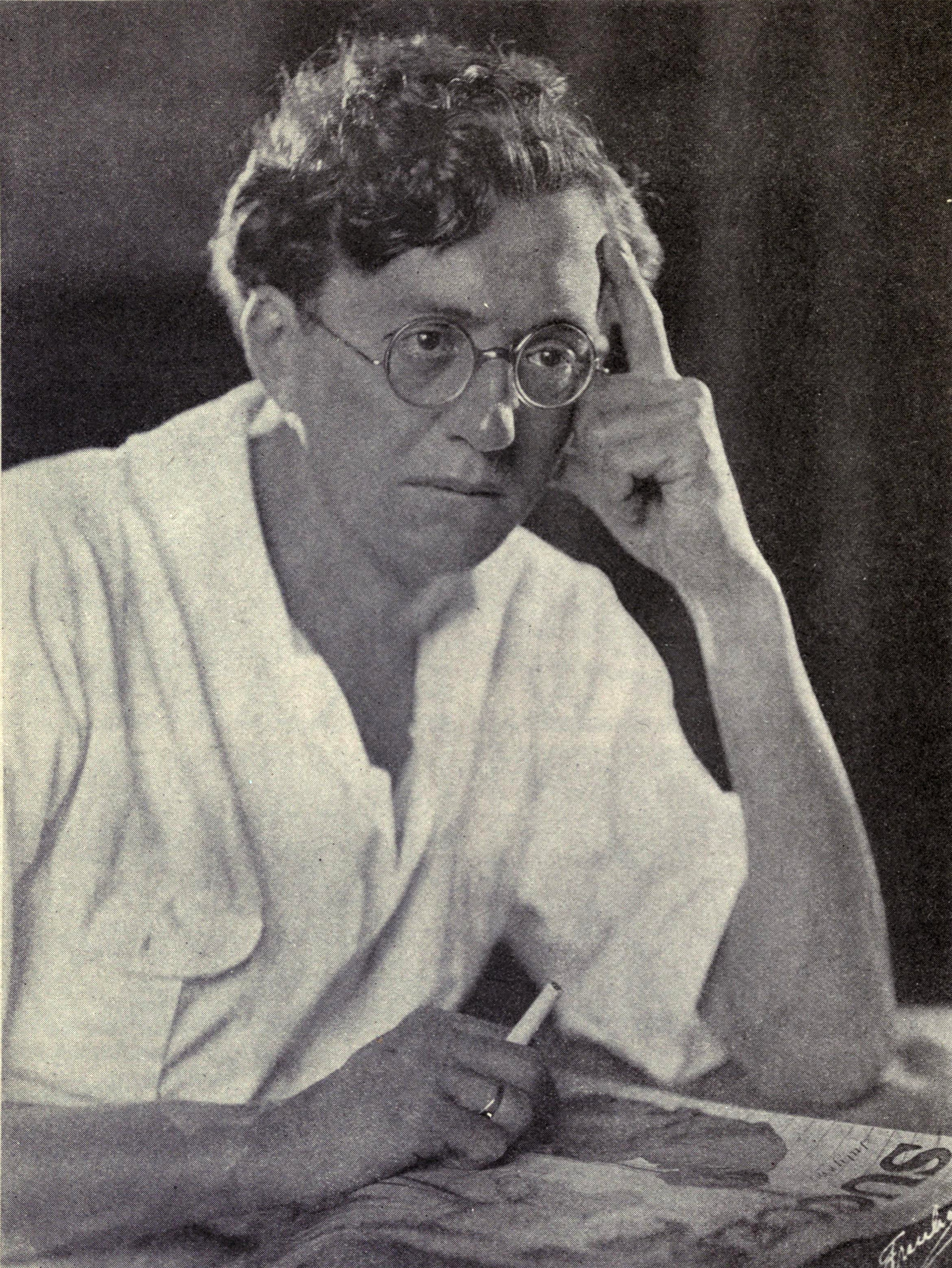
- Stuart Paton in 1921.
- Born: 23 July 1883; Glasgow, Scotland
- Died: 16 December 1944 (aged 61); Woodland Hills, Los Angeles, United States
- Other name: Stuart Payton
- Years active: 1914–1938

Stuart Paton (23 July 1883 – 16 December 1944) was a British director, screenwriter and actor of the silent era. Paton mostly worked with Universal, and is accredited with directing 67 films between 1915 and 1938. He also wrote for 24 films between 1914 and 1927.

== Biography ==
Paton was born in Glasgow, Scotland on 23 July 1883. He was married to actress Ethel Patrick. Like Stuart, Ethel had a background in English theatre before moving to the United States. Ethel continued to work in Broadway theater before she married Paton. Paton had three children: Edward, Lillian, and George. In 1916, George died at the age of one. Like their father, Edward and Lillian also worked with Universal in music editing and the film library, respectively. On 18 September 1944, Ethel died at the Motion Picture & Television Fund Country House in Woodland Hills, Los Angeles, where Stuart also died on 16 December of the same year, at the age of 61. His cremated remains are stored at Chapel of the Pines Crematory in Los Angeles, California.

== Career ==
Paton started his career working in London theater before moving to Los Angeles in 1912 where he would work for Universal, for whom he would do a majority of his writing and directing throughout his career. Despite a large filmography, many of Paton's films are lost or very little is known about them today.

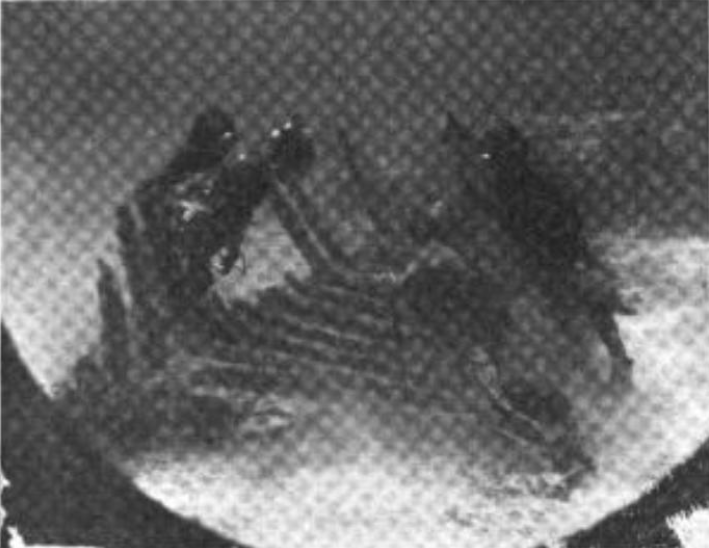
Scene from 20,000 Leagues Under the Sea

Paton is perhaps remembered best for his 1916 film 20,000 Leagues Under the Sea. The film was revolutionary at the time because it was one of the first motion pictures to include underwater filming. The production used the "photosphere" technology developed by John Ernest Williamson and his brother, George. The Williamson brothers created a system that involved a long, extensible tube with a large chamber at the bottom that would allow a camera operator to work at depth. The underwater portions were shot in Nassau, Bahamas. The film was very expensive to produce for the time, and while some praised Paton for pioneering something so bold, not everyone thought the price of the film could possibly lead it being profitable.

Paton was also fairly known for a few American Westerns featuring Harry Carey, a very well known star in the American Western genre, but they are now mostly lost films.

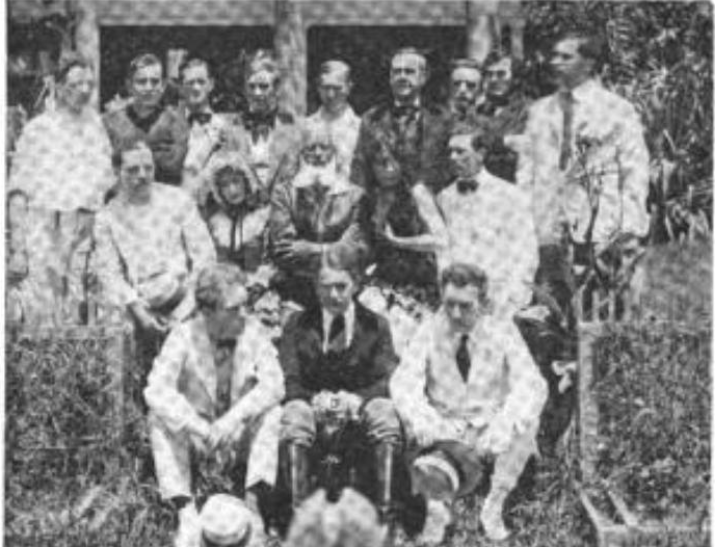
The cast from 20,000 Leagues Under the Sea

== Selected filmography ==
- The Mark of Cain (1916)
- 20,000 Leagues Under the Sea (1916)
- The Voice on the Wire (1917)
- Like Wildfire (1917)
- The Gray Ghost (1917)
- The Border Raiders (1918)
- The Marriage Lie (1918)
- The Wine Girl (1918)
- Terror of the Range (1919)
- The Devil's Trail (1919)
- The Little Diplomat (1919)
- The Fatal Sign (1920)
- The Hope Diamond Mystery (1921)
- Dr. Jim (1921)
- The Torrent (1921)
- Conflict (1921)
- Reputation (1921)
- Wolf Law (1922)
- The Way Back (1922)
- Man to Man (1922)
- The Man Who Married His Own Wife (1922)
- The Married Flapper (1922)
- One Wonderful Night (1922)
- Bavu (1923)
- Burning Words (1923)
- The Love Brand (1923)
- The Scarlet Car (1923)
- The Night Hawk (1924)
- Tainted Money (1924)
- Forest Havoc (1926)
- Frenzied Flames (1926)
- The Lady from Hell (1926)
- The Wolf Hunters (1926)
- The Baited Trap (1926)
- Fangs of Destiny (1927)
- The Bullet Mark (1928)
- The Hound of Silver Creek (1928)
- First Aid (1931)
- Chinatown After Dark (1931)
- Hell-Bent for Frisco (1931)
- Is There Justice? (1931)
- The Mystery Trooper (1931 serial)
- The Silent Code (1935)
- The Alamo: Shrine of Texas Liberty (1936)
