= The Wolf Hunters (1926 film) =

1926 film

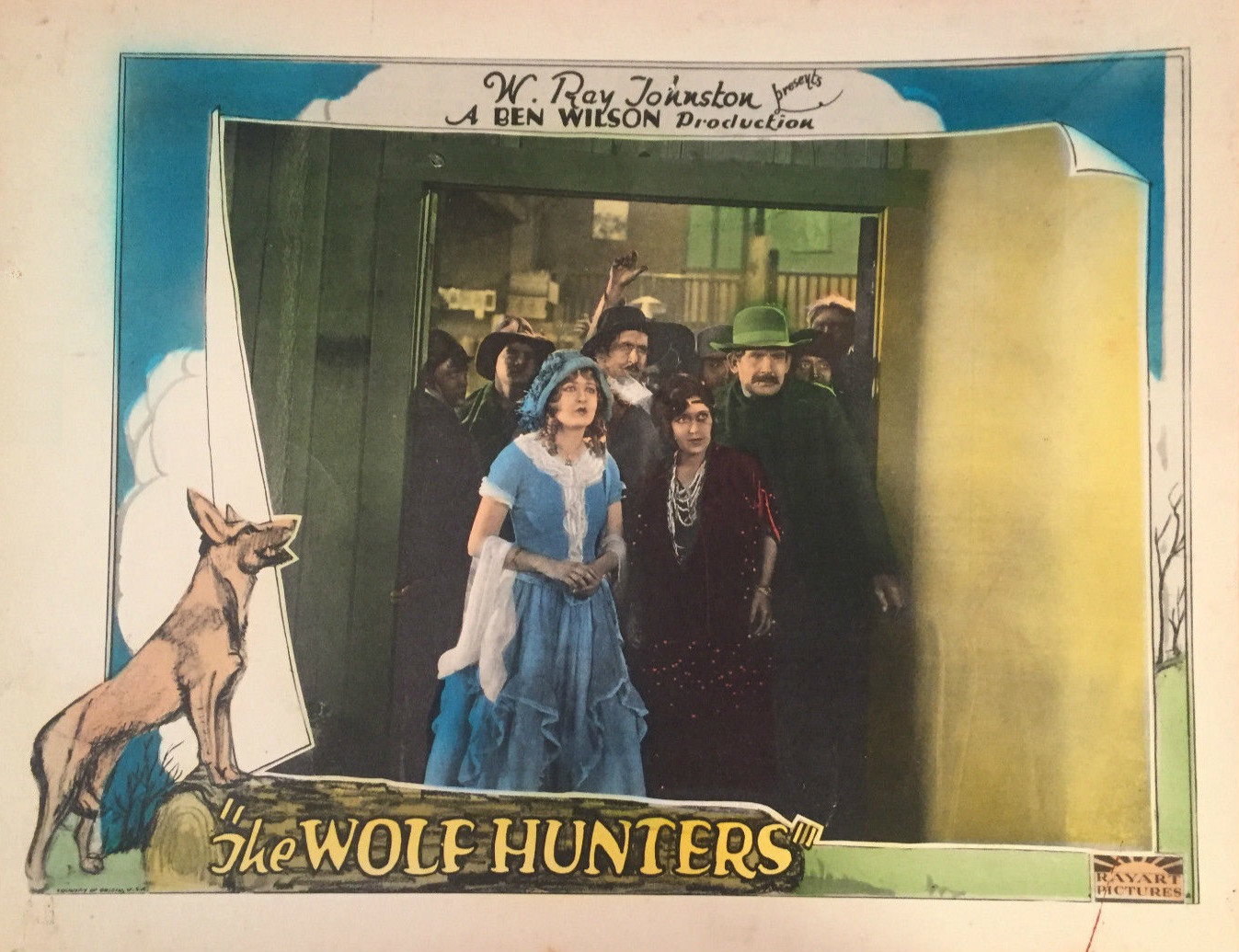
- Directed by: Stuart Paton
- Based on: The Wolf Hunters by James Oliver Curwood
- Produced by: Ben F. Wilson; W. Ray Johnston
- Starring: Robert McKim; Virginia Brown Faire; Mildred Harris
- Production company: Ben Wilson Productions
- Distributed by: Rayart Pictures; Wardour Films (UK)
- Release date: July 20, 1926
- Running time: 65 minutes
- Country: United States
- Languages: Silent; English intertitles

The Wolf Hunters is a 1926 American silent Western film, also classified as a Northern, directed by Stuart Paton and starring Robert McKim, Virginia Brown Faire and Mildred Harris. It is based on the 1908 novel The Wolf Hunters by James Oliver Curwood.

== Cast ==
- Robert McKim as Ainsworth
- Virginia Brown Faire as Minnetaki
- Alan Roscoe as Sergeant Steve Drew
- Mildred Harris as Helen Ainsworth
- David Torrence as Le Grange
- Al Ferguson as Cleave
- Carroll Nye as Roderick Drew
- Joe de la Cruz as Woomba

== Bibliography ==
- Langman, Larry. A Guide to Silent Westerns. Greenwood Publishing Group, 1992.
