= Silver Streak (dog) =

Famous German Shepherd dog

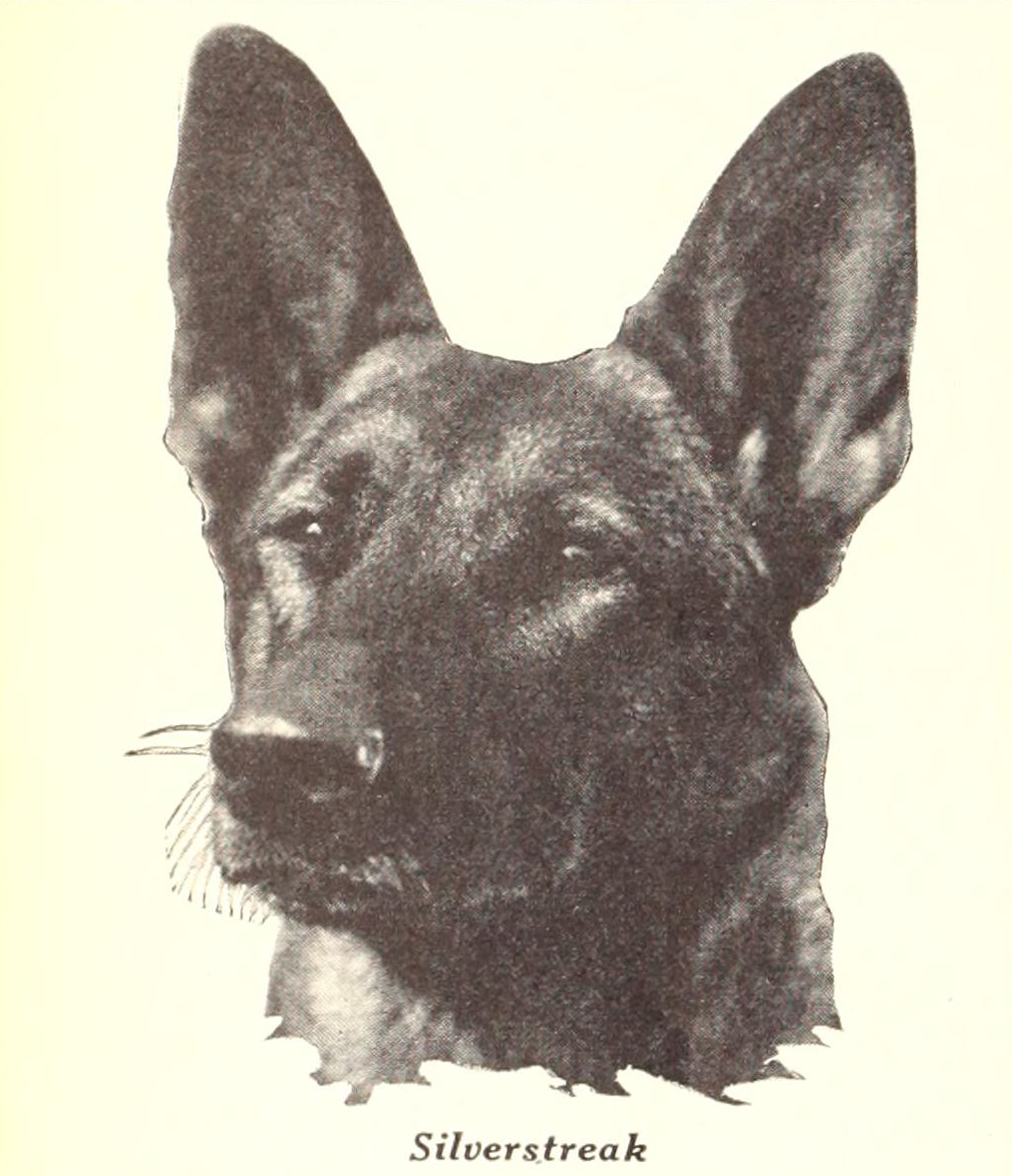
Silver Streak appearing in a programme for short films

Silver Streak (often followed by the title King of Dog Stars, The Dog of Wonder or The Wonder Dog; 1924 – unknown) was a male German Shepherd that starred in motion pictures. He was a police dog with a long pedigree, the last in a great line that appeared in film, and considered to be Universal's attempt to rival the success of Warner's Rin Tin Tin.

== Early life ==
Silver Streak's education included thorough police training and army Red Cross work. He was said to: be able to register several emotions, showing hate, fear, love and affection; at will, be savage or kind; have had the power to throw a well-developed man; understand over 150 words in German and English; and only need to rehearse a scene once with his owner/trainer, Captain Rowe, before performing on camera. Off the set, Silver Streak was extremely affectionate and showed no nervousness that had been typical of animals acting in movies during that period. During the filming of Fangs of Justice, Silver Streak took a decided liking to the film's star June Marlowe, staying with her at every possible moment.

== Acting ==
Silver Streak acted in at least six serials and movies, all of which are believed to be lost, though posters for most of these releases still exist. A trailer for The Silent Flyer still remains, resident at the UCLA Film and Television Archive, while production stills survive for Fangs of Justice.

=== Filmography ===
- The Silent Flyer (1926)
- Fangs of Justice (1926)
- The Snarl of Hate (1927)
- Where Trails Begin (1927)
- Cross Breed (1927)
- Code of the Air (1928)

== Later life ==
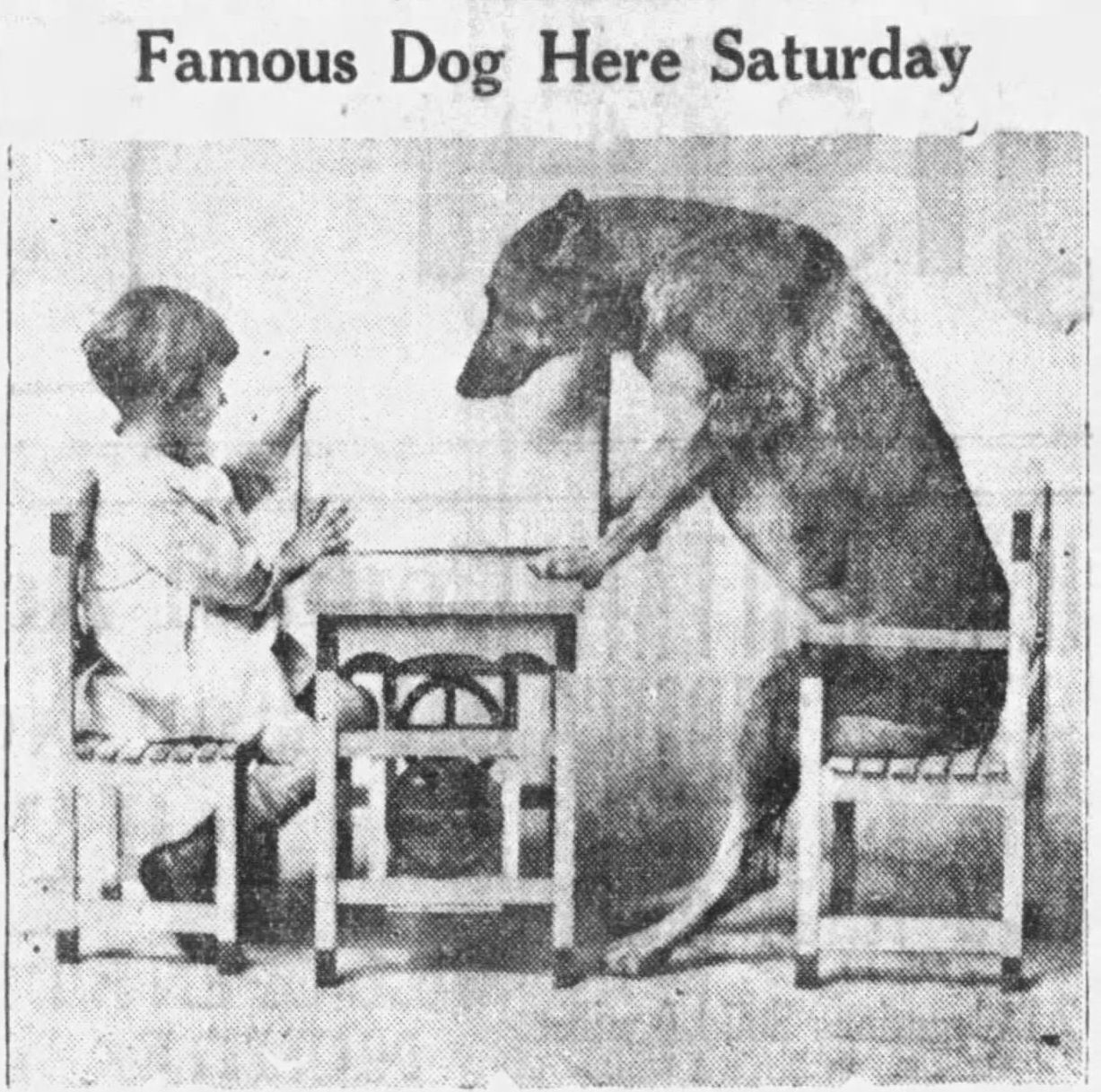
After his acting career, Silver Streak would continue to perform in front of a live audience, which included the trick of him sitting on a chair like a human.

After retiring from movies, Silver Streak would perform tricks in front of live audiences. Captain Rowe would demonstrate Silver Streak's ability to follow direction, ending the show with the dog sitting up on a chair while playing the piano and singing.

== See also ==
- List of individual dogs
- List of lost films
- Rin Tin Tin

== Bibliography ==
- Orlean, Susan (2011). Rin Tin Tin: The Life and the Legend. Simon & Schuster. p. 73. ISBN 978-1-4391-9014-2.
