= The Hound of Silver Creek =

1928 film

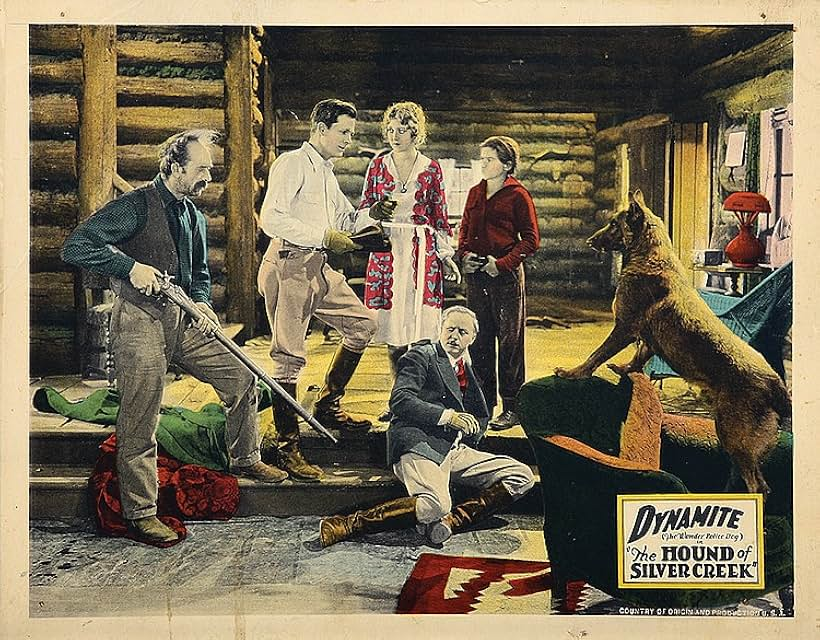
- Directed by: Stuart Paton
- Screenplay by: Paul M. Bryan; Gardner Bradford
- Story by: Paul M. Bryan
- Starring: Dynamite the Dog; Edmund Cobb; Gloria Grey; Gladden James; Billy 'Red' Jones; Frank Rice
- Cinematography: Jerome Ash
- Edited by: Arthur Hilton
- Production company: Universal Pictures
- Distributed by: Universal Pictures
- Release date: May 20, 1928
- Running time: 50 minutes
- Country: United States
- Language: Silent (English intertitles)

The Hound of Silver Creek is a 1928 American silent drama film directed by Stuart Paton, and written by Paul M. Bryan and Gardner Bradford. The film stars Dynamite the Dog, Edmund Cobb, Gloria Grey, Gladden James, Billy "Red" Jones, and Frank Rice. The film was released on May 20, 1928, by Universal Pictures.

== Cast ==
- Dynamite the Dog as Dynamite
- Edmund Cobb as Jack Brooks
- Gloria Grey as Molly White
- Gladden James as Marvin Henley
- Billy "Red" Jones as Spots Lawton
- Frank Rice as Slim Terwilliger
- Frank Clark as John Lawton
