= The Call of the Heart =

1928 film

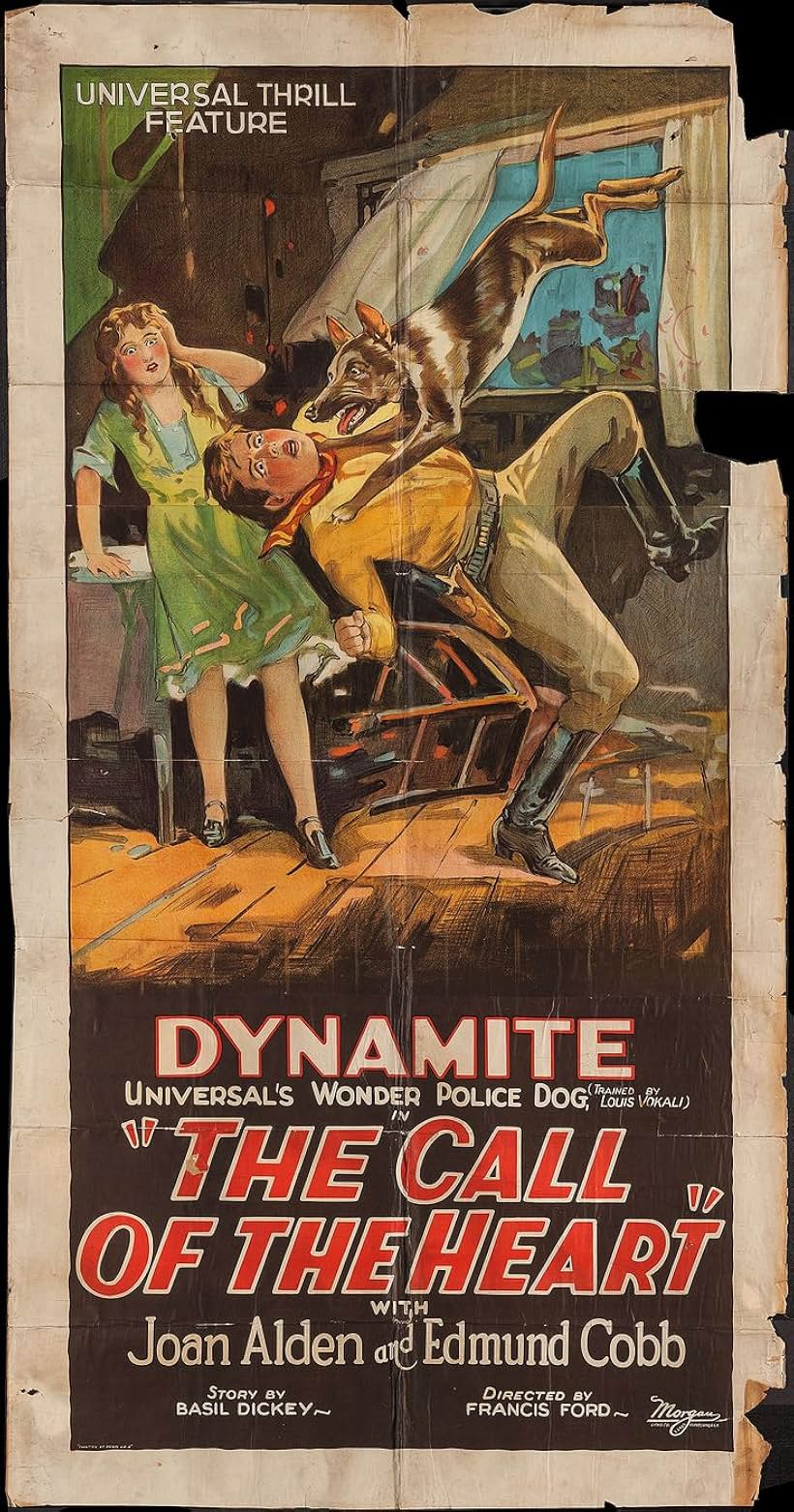
- Directed by: Francis Ford
- Screenplay by: Basil Dickey; Gardner Bradford
- Story by: Basil Dickey
- Starring: Dynamite the Dog; Joan Alden; Edmund Cobb; William Steele; Maurice Murphy; George Plues
- Cinematography: Jerome Ash
- Edited by: Leon Barsha
- Production company: Universal Pictures
- Distributed by: Universal Pictures
- Release date: January 29, 1928
- Running time: 60 minutes
- Country: United States
- Languages: Silent; English intertitles

The Call of the Heart is a 1928 American silent Western film directed by Francis Ford and written by Basil Dickey and Gardner Bradford. The film stars Dynamite the Dog, Joan Alden, Edmund Cobb, William Steele, Maurice Murphy and George Plues. The film was released on January 29, 1928, by Universal Pictures.

== Cast ==
- Dynamite the Dog as Dynamite
- Joan Alden as Molly O'Day
- Edmund Cobb as Jerry Wilson
- William Steele as Dave Crenshaw
- Maurice Murphy as Josh O'Day
- George Plues as Henchman
- Frank Baker as Henchman
- Owen Train as Henchman

== Preservation ==
With no holdings located in archives, The Call of the Heart is considered a lost film.
