= Raja Aur Rancho =

- Directed by: Murli Nalappa, Rajan Waghdhare
- Starring: Ved Thapar; Rancho
- No. of seasons: 1
- No. of episodes: 179

Production
- Producer: Murali Nallappa

Original release
- Network: DD Metro
- Release: 1996 – 2000

Raja Aur Rancho is a detective series which aired in India on DD Metro in 1997–1998. The show is about a detective named Raja (Ved Thapar) and his pet monkey Rancho. Every week, this duo solve a new crime. Famous TV Actor Mohan Bhandari played the role of Raja in initial episodes.

== Cast ==
- Ved Thapar as Anand / Raja 2
- Rancho as Rancho
- Sameer Dharmadhikari as Episodic in some episodes
- Murali Sharma as Episodic in some episodes
- Mohan Bhandari as Raja 1: Anand's elder brother
- Rishabh Saxena as Dimitri
- Shanker Iyer
- Anand Abhyankar
- Seema Punshe
- Rakesh Vidua
- Leena Ganatra
- Master Girish
- G.Prakash
- Rajiv Saxena
- Chotu Dada
- Dinesh Dogra
- J.P.Sharma
