= J. Fred Muggs =

Chimpanzee mascot of NBC's Today Show (born 1952)

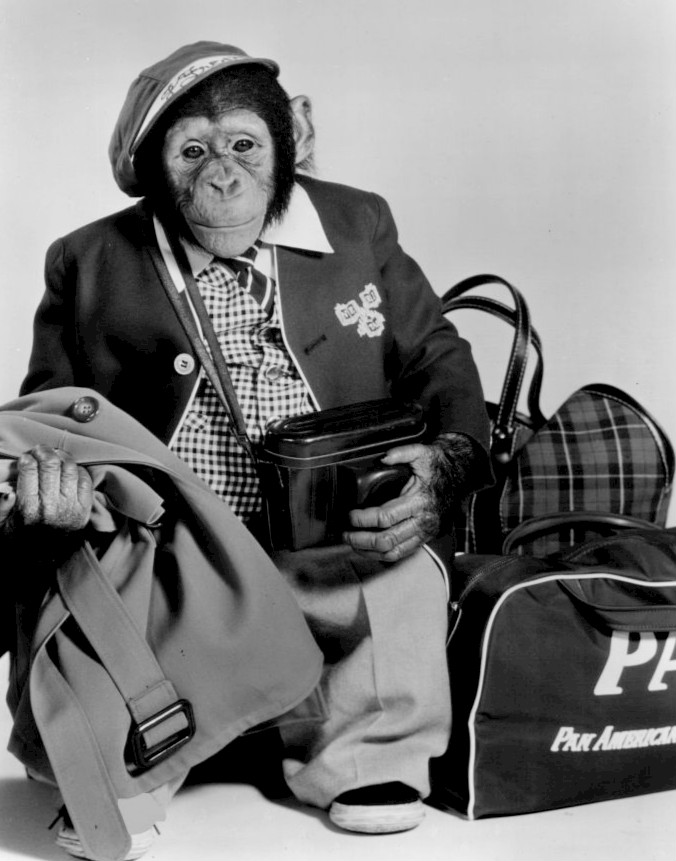
- J. Fred Muggs in 1954
- Species: Common chimpanzee
- Sex: Male
- Born: March 14, 1952; French Cameroon
- Occupation: Television personality
- Years active: 1953–1975

J. Fred Muggs (born March 14, 1952) is a chimpanzee born in the African colony of French Cameroon that forms part of modern-day Cameroon. Brought to New York City before his first birthday, he was bought by two former NBC pages and eventually appeared on a host of television shows on that network, including NBC's Today Show, where he served as mascot from 1953 to 1957. Muggs worked in several television shows, including a short-lived eponymous series, toured the world, and worked at Busch Gardens in Tampa, Florida. He officially retired at age 23.

== Life and career ==
Muggs was born in French Cameroon. He first became popular when he was in Henry Trefflich's pet store in New York. A "name that chimp" contest led to his being named Mr. Muggs, to which the Today Show later added "J. Fred". Carmine "Bud" Mennella and Leroy "Roy" Waldron, former NBC pages, bought him for $600 when he was 10 months old and Mennella trained him. He appeared on the Perry Como Show and Pat Weaver of the Today Show saw potential in him; Mennella had an appointment with NBC executives for Muggs to audition for the Today Show but missed it; however, Muggs' antics in a coffee shop led the president of the network to offer him a contract anyway. Muggs first appeared on the show on February 3, 1953, dressed in diapers like a baby.

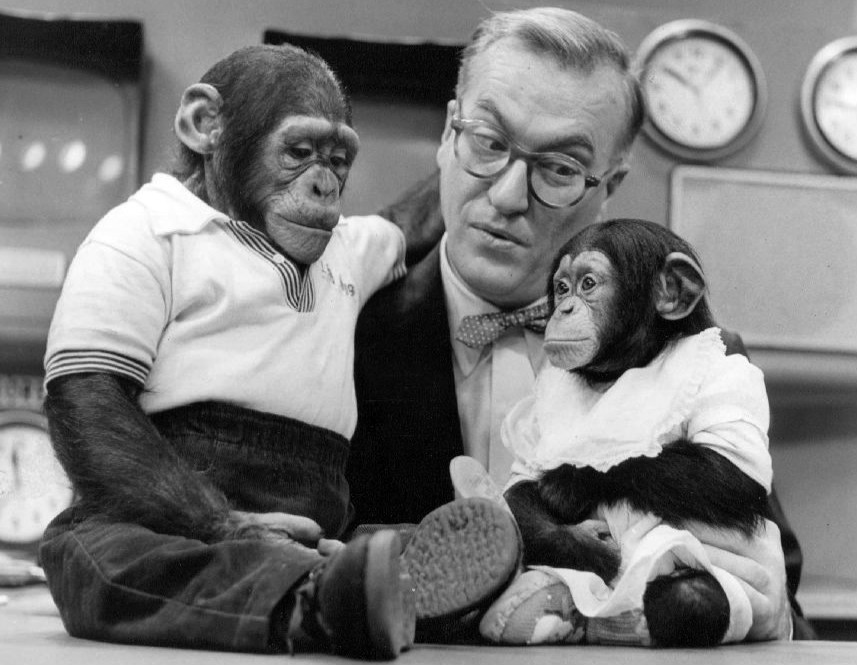
Muggs (left) and companion, Phoebe B. Beebe, with Dave Garroway, 1954

The Today Show had begun in 1952, with Dave Garroway as host, but was doing poorly. The introduction of a chimpanzee caused Jim Fleming, the original newsreader, to quit; he was replaced by Frank Blair. However, the addition of Muggs boosted ratings and helped win advertisers. The program's producer, Richard Pinkham, once estimated Muggs had earned the network $100 million. Muggs sat in Garroway's lap, recognized more than 500 words, and had a wardrobe of 450 outfits. He "read" the day's newspapers, imitated Popeye and played the piano with Steve Allen. Merchandise featuring him included books, comics, and games. As a star, he was called on to open supermarkets and commission US Navy ships.

Many sources refer to Garroway as jealous of Muggs. Joe Hagan of The New York Observer noted, without attribution, that "Legend has it that ... Mr. Garroway grew jealous and began spiking Muggs' orange juice with benzedrine to make him misbehave and deliver his human co-host back to center stage." Many sources suggested that Muggs did not have a good disposition. He has been described as "a nasty little monkey" and as "throwing legendary tantrums." He is said to have learned that if he misbehaved when the red light was on, indicating that the program was broadcasting live, he could not be disciplined. At the press conference announcing his addition to the show, Muggs yanked Garroway's glasses off. He was restrained in a harness and leash but sometimes escaped. During one remote broadcast, he climbed a tree and had to be lured down with bananas. In Beirut, an associate producer had to chase him in her underwear down a hotel hallway.

Many contemporary websites refer to Muggs as having bitten comedian Martha Raye's arm. Though Menella's son (and Muggs' later owner), Gerald Preis, said in 2004 that the story of Muggs biting Raye was "just plain bullshit", it is well documented in the 1954 press. A report from an NBC representative was circulated by the International News Service: "An NBC spokesman said yesterday the network plans no punitive action against J. Fred Muggs, popular TV chimp star which bit comedienne Martha Raye and her understudy [Vickie Carlson] Saturday night."

Muggs's handlers at one point sued Garroway in the chimp's name for allegedly ruining Muggs's career by claiming to have been bitten by him; Garroway said Muggs had bitten him on the face on live TV.

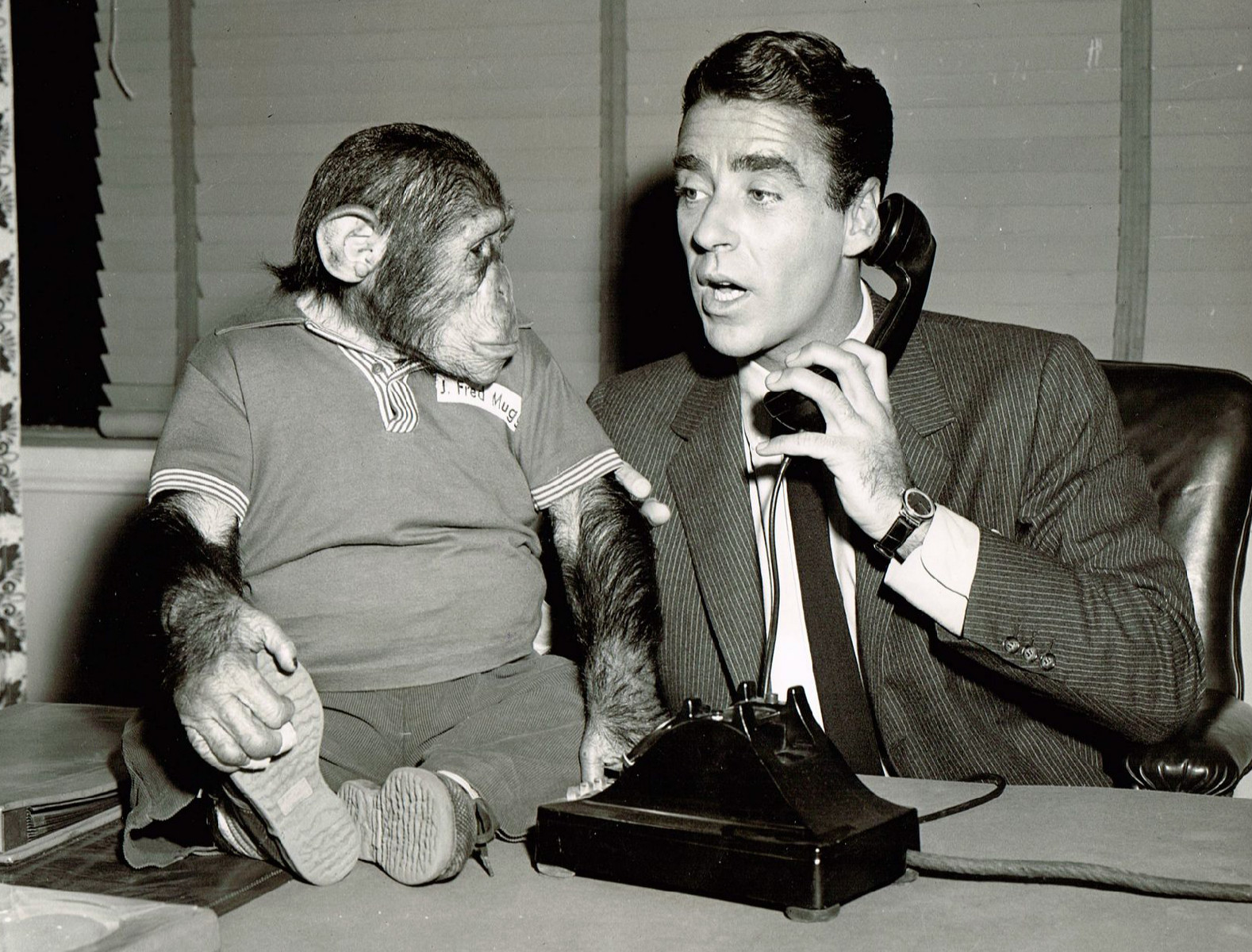
J. Fred Muggs with Peter Lawford on the set of the NBC sitcom Dear Phoebe (1954)

During a 1955 episode of the game show Make the Connection, Muggs appeared with Joanne Cottingham, who served as his babysitter. The panel was supposed to guess her relationship to the chimpanzee, but after Muggs was introduced, he spent most of the segment running all over the set until host Gene Rayburn finally called the game and awarded Cottingham the show's maximum $150 payoff by default.

Muggs was also an artist. In 1958, one of his finger paintings was published on the cover of Mad #38. Supposedly, Muggs bit editor Al Feldstein.

Muggs was associated with Mad in another way. When the magazine ran an article titled "The Dave Garrowunway Show". This article focused on the chimpanzee, whom writer Harvey Kurtzman named "J. Floyd Gluggs," and his apparent ambition to take over "Garrowunway's" spot as anchor. Sure enough, by the end of the article, with "Garrowunway" rapping rudely on the window from outside the building, "Gluggs" appears in Garroway's familiar closing pose, in suit, glasses and lavalier microphone, saying "vootie" in place of the anchor's tagline "Peace," with his right palm thrust forward. The caption reads, "By George...we've warned Garrowunway to watch out..."

Today interrupted its coverage of Queen Elizabeth II's coronation (which involved slightly delayed still pictures and BBC radio audio) with foolery and advertising for tea, featuring Muggs. This was severely criticized in the United Kingdom as well as by some US television critics, including Jack Gould in The New York Times. In the UK, the introduction of commercial television was being debated at the time, and its opponents felt that the Muggs spots strengthened their case. It was arguably a key factor in the strong regulation of ITV (by the Independent Television Authority) written into the Television Act 1954, including its ban on advertising breaks during programming featuring the Royal Family.

Muggs went on a world tour to promote Today. In Japan, where his popularity was second only to that of Marilyn Monroe, 15 geishas waited on him, while in Russia Izvestia described him as "a symbol of the American way of life" and said he was "necessary in order that the average American should not look into reports on rising taxes, and decreasing pay, but rather laugh at the funny mug of a chimpanzee." In 1957—supposedly following the Martha Raye incident—he was replaced on the show by another chimpanzee called Kokomo Jr. NBC's press release stated that he intended "to extend his personal horizons" and he briefly starred in The J. Fred Muggs Show. He then worked at Busch Gardens in Tampa, Florida, and appeared on Good Morning America (on ABC) to celebrate his 23rd birthday, before retiring.

In 2004, Joe Hagan reached Gerald Preis, Mennella's son, at his home, where Preis stated that Muggs "has a little gray, mostly in his beard."

In February 2026, WMTV reported that Muggs' current status was unknown, with some reports that he may have died in June 2025.

== Legacy ==
For many years, TV Guide ran an annual feature highlighting its takes on the year's most dubious television programs, episodes, activities, and issues, "The J. Fred Muggs Awards for Distinguished Foolishness".

== See also ==
- List of individual apes
