= Fangs of Justice =

1926 film

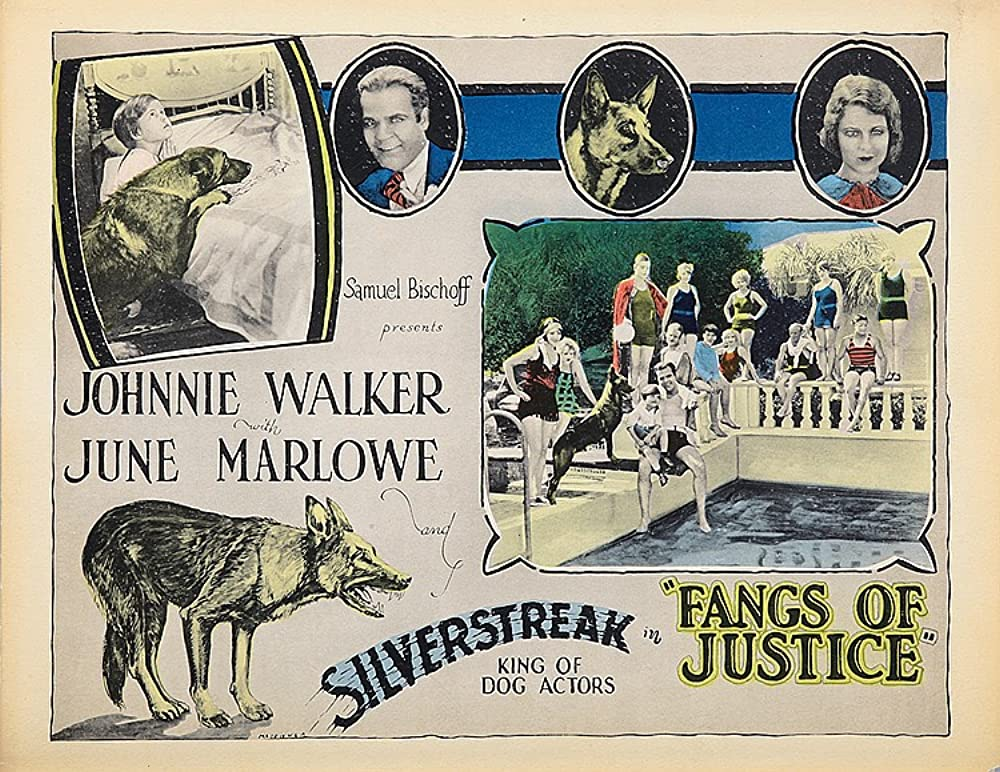
- Directed by: Noel M. Smith
- Written by: Adele De Vore
- Produced by: Samuel Bischoff
- Starring: Johnnie Walker; June Marlowe
- Cinematography: James S. Brown Jr.
- Production company: Samuel Bischoff Productions
- Distributed by: Samuel Bischoff Productions; Gaumont British Distributors (UK)
- Release date: December 23, 1926
- Country: United States
- Languages: Silent; English intertitles

Fangs of Justice is a 1926 American silent adventure film directed by Noel M. Smith and starring Johnnie Walker and June Marlowe.

== Cast ==
- Johnnie Walker as Terry Randall
- June Marlowe as Janet Morgan
- Wheeler Oakman as Paul Orr
- Frank Hagney as Walter Page
- Freddie Burke Frederick as Sonny Morgan
- Cecile Cameron as Trixie
- Silver Streak as Silver Streak (as Silver Streak-King of Dog Actors)

== Bibliography ==
- Kenneth White, Munden (1997). The American Film Institute Catalog of Motion Pictures Produced in the United States, Part 1. University of California Press. ISBN 9780520209695.
