= Fangs of Destiny =

1927 film

- Directed by: Stuart Paton
- Screenplay by: George Morgan; Gardner Bradford
- Story by: George Morgan
- Starring: Dynamite the Dog; Edmund Cobb; Betty Caldwell; George Periolat; Carl Sepulveda; Al Ferguson
- Cinematography: Jerome Ash
- Production company: Universal Pictures
- Distributed by: Universal Pictures
- Release date: December 4, 1927
- Running time: 58 minutes
- Country: United States
- Languages: Silent; English intertitles

Fangs of Destiny is a 1927 American silent Western film directed by Stuart Paton and written by George Morgan and Gardner Bradford. The film stars Dynamite the Dog, Edmund Cobb, Betty Caldwell, George Periolat, Carl Sepulveda and Al Ferguson. The film was released on December 4, 1927, by Universal Pictures. A print of Fangs of Destiny exists.

== Cast ==
- Dynamite the Dog as Dynamite
- Edmund Cobb as Jerry Matthews
- Betty Caldwell as Rose Shelby
- George Periolat as Colonel Shelby
- Carl Sepulveda as Hank Mitchell
- Al Ferguson as Thomas Shields
- Joan Hathaway as Sally Ann
- Brick Cannon as Sheriff Canby
