= The Silent Flyer =

1926 film

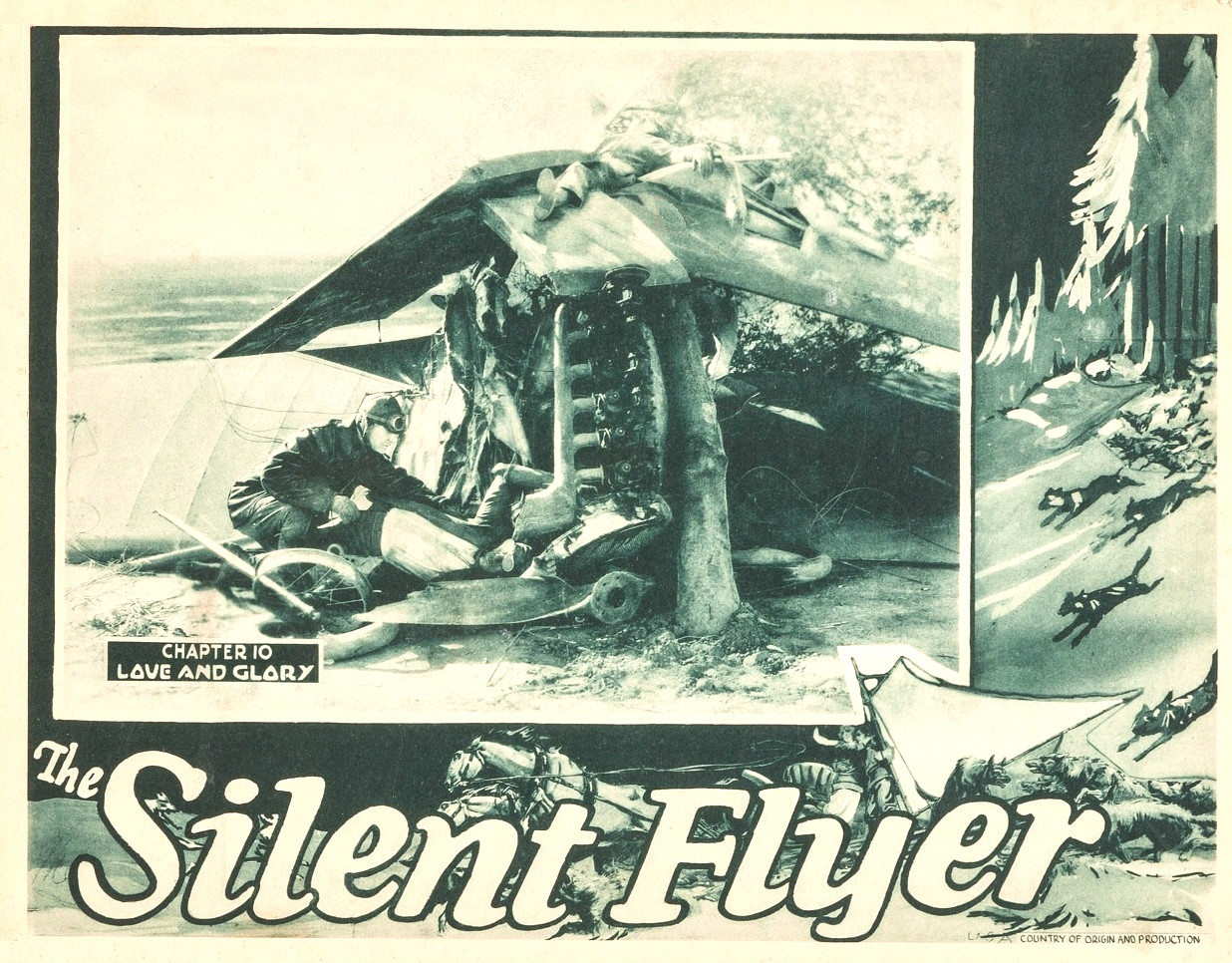
- Lobby card for Chapter 10, "Love and Glory"
- Directed by: William James Craft
- Written by: George Morgan
- Produced by: Samuel Bischoff; Nat Levine
- Starring: Malcolm McGregor; Louise Lorraine
- Production company: Mascot Pictures Corporation
- Distributed by: Universal Pictures
- Release date: November 8, 1926
- Running time: 10 episodes
- Country: United States
- Language: Silent (English intertitles)
- Budget: $70,000

The Silent Flyer is a 1926 10-episode (chapter) American adventure film serial directed by William James Craft. The film serial was sold to Universal Pictures for $75,000 with the resulting funds used in the founding of Mascot Pictures.

== Plot ==
Scientist Benjamin Darrell (Anders Randolf) has invented a silent aircraft motor of tremendous potential benefit to aeronautical and military concerns. A plot is underway to steal the invention.

Lloyd Darrell (Malcolm McGregor), a secret service agent, disguises himself as Bill Smith and covertly endeavors to prevent the theft. Together with pretty Helen Corliss (Louise Lorraine), and most importantly, Silver Streak, a clever German shepherd, the trio serve to foil any criminals.

== Chapter titles ==
1. The Jaws of Death
2. Dynamited
3. Waters of Death
4. The Treacherous Trail
5. Plunge of Peril
6. Flight of Honor
7. Under Arrest
8. Flames of Terror
9. Hurled Through Space
10. Love and Glory

== Cast ==
- Malcolm McGregor as Lloyd Darrell, posing as Bill Smith
- Louise Lorraine as Helen Corliss
- George B. Williams as John Corliss (credited as George Williams)
- Albert J. Smith as Jack Hutchins
- Anders Randolf as Benjamin Darrell
- Edith Yorke as Mrs. Darrell
- Arthur Morrison
- Robert Walker
- Dorothy Tallcot (as Dorothy Talcott)
- Thur Fairfax
- Hughie Mack
- Silver Streak as Silver Streak, a dog

== Production ==
Enterprising producer Nat Levine shot the entire The Silent Flyer serial on location and on rented stages, managing to bring all 10 chapters in on a budget of 70,000 dollars. Instead of releasing his first serial on the usual "States Rights basis", Levine sold The Silent Flyer to Universal for 75,000 dollars, the profits going toward establishing Mascot Pictures, a Poverty Row film company that would continue the serial tradition into the "talkies" era.

== Reception ==
The Silent Flyer, produced independently by the enterprising Nat Levine, was a low-budget 10-chapter action serial that featured Danish-born character actor Anders Randolph. Levine also introduced a four-footed star, Silver Streak, a clever German shepherd, that was his answer to Rin Tin Tin, a consistent money-maker for Warner Bros. (Note: In the style of "Fatty" Arbuckle, an obese comic, Hughie Mack was added to The Silent Flyer, chiefly to provide comedy relief.)

== Preservation status ==
The Silent Flyer is considered to be a lost film. Only a trailer remains, resident at the UCLA Film and Television Archive.

== See also ==
- List of lost films
