= Code of the Air =

1928 silent film

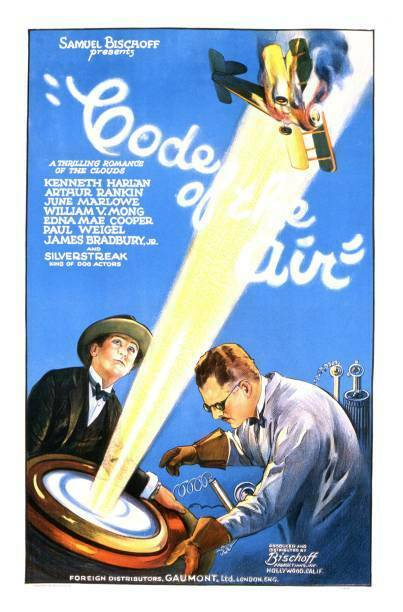
- Directed by: James P. Hogan
- Written by: De Leon Anthony; Barry Barringer
- Produced by: Samuel Bischoff
- Starring: Kenneth Harlan; June Marlowe; Arthur Rankin
- Cinematography: William Miller
- Edited by: De Leon Anthony
- Production company: Samuel Bischoff Productions
- Distributed by: Samuel Bischoff Productions
- Release date: October 1928
- Running time: 60 minutes
- Country: United States
- Languages: Silent; English intertitles

Code of the Air is a 1928 American silent thriller film directed by James P. Hogan and starring Kenneth Harlan, June Marlowe and Arthur Rankin.

== Cast ==
- Kenneth Harlan as Blair Thompson
- June Marlowe as Helen Carson
- Arthur Rankin as Alfred Clark
- William V. Mong as Professor Ross
- Paul Weigel as Doc Carson
- James Bradbury Jr. as Stuttering Slim
- Silver Streak as Silver Streak

== Bibliography ==
- John T. Soister, Henry Nicolella & Steve Joyce. American Silent Horror, Science Fiction and Fantasy Feature Films, 1913-1929. McFarland, 2014.
