= Mutt & Stuff =

American children's television series

- Genre: Educational
- Created by: Sid and Marty Krofft; Bradley Zweig
- Presented by: Calvin Millan
- Starring: Calvin Millan; Puppeteers: Meegan Godfrey; Donna Kimball; Drew Massey; Victor Yerrid
- Theme music composer: Michael "Smidi" Smith; Michelle Lewis
- Opening theme: "Let's Go to Dog School"
- Ending theme: "Let's Go to Dog School"
- Composer: Michael Picton
- Country of origin: United States
- Original language: English
- No. of seasons: 2
- No. of episodes: 74

Production
- Executive producers: Sid and Marty Krofft; Bradley Zweig; Cesar Millan
- Running time: 21 minutes
- Production companies: Cesar's Way; Sid and Marty Krofft Television; Nickelodeon Productions

Original release
- Network: Nick Jr. Channel
- Release: March 6, 2015 – November 1, 2017

Mutt & Stuff is an American children's television series that aired on the Nick Jr. Channel. The series premiered on March 6, 2015, with an hour-long pilot and began airing regularly on July 10, 2015. It was created by Sid and Marty Krofft (in their first new product in over a decade) and Bradley Zweig. It stars Calvin Millan, the son of the series' producer Cesar Millan.

== Plot ==
Starring Calvin Millan, son of "The Dog Whisperer" Cesar Millan, and his larger than life yellow dog named Stuff. The series follows the duo and their day-to-day activities at Mutt & Stuff, a wacky and whimsical school just for dogs.

== Characters ==
=== Main ===
- Stuff (performed by Meegan Godfrey, face-performed and voiced by Drew Massey) (Nick Mercer in UK) is Calvin's giant stuffed dog and best he is also Calvin's best friend. In the double-length special "H.R. Pufnstuf Comes to Mutt & Stuff," it is revealed that his uncle is the title character of the Kroffts' earlier series H.R. Pufnstuf. He is very similar in appearance to Pufnstuf as well.
- Zoe (performed by Donna Kimball) and Davenport (performed by Drew Massey) are two cats who comment on the action from a tree outside the dog school where they often exchange jokes, similar to the characters of Statler and Waldorf from The Muppet Show. They have a tendency to fall out of their tree while laughing at their own jokes while stating that they are OK. They also wear glasses. Zoe is blue while Davenport is purple.
- Zippy (performed by Jumpy) is Calvin's pet dog
- Cesar (portrayed by Cesar Millan) is Calvin's father.
- Melvin (performed by Victor Yerrid) is a red, talking fire hydrant that is outside the dog school, and tells jokes
- Grandma (performed by Kuma von Clifford) is the dog in charge of the puppies while Calvin and Stuff are with the adult dogs
- Bow Wow (voiced by Victor Yerrid) is the automated A.I. of the Bow Wow Chow Snack Machine that appears in later episodes
- Marty (performed by Drew Massey) and Sid (performed by Victor Yerrid) are two talking trees that were a gift from Stuff's uncle H.R. Pufnstuf that live on the playground. They are named after the show's creators, Sid & Marty Krofft.
- Noodles (performed by Donna Kimball) is a mouse who lives in the wall next to the puppy tunnel. He loves to play jokes by pulling a rope and having confetti fall all over.
- Junior Shades is a small dog who wears sunglasses. He appears in the episode "Dogs on a Plane" as co-captain with Zippy. He appears again in "Sherdog Bones" as a student at Mutt and Stuff.

=== Others ===
- Clover (portrayed by Mila Brener) is Cuddles' owner
- Owen (portrayed by Aiden Lewandowski) is Sunny's owner
- Luke (portrayed by Oskar Jacobs) is Dude's owner
- Dr. Christina (portrayed by Kristina Krofft) is the dogs' veterinarian
- A Popcorn Vendor (portrayed by Omar von Muller) appears at the end of the episodes handing out popcorn to people eventually resulting to Zippy jumping into him losing his popcorn.
- Annie the Animal Rescuer who guest stars and later becomes a recurring character in season two (portrayed by Rachel Eggleston)

=== Guests ===
- Marco (portrayed by Ashton Arbab) is Calvin's cousin and Cesar's nephew
- Gabby Groomer (portrayed by Raini Rodriguez) is the dog school's dog groomer and she appears in 6 episodes: "Skate Doggin", Gabi's Groom-A-Thon, "The Wag 4 Rock Concert", "The Happy Hallowoof Party", "H.R. Pufnstuf's Happy Tree Jamboree", and "Surprise Birthday Balloon Bash"
- Sergio Style (portrayed by Rico Rodriguez) is Gabi Groomer's brother who appeared in the episode "Surprise Birthday Balloon Bash"
- H.R. Pufnstuf (face performed by Donna Kimball, performed by Mary Karcz, voiced by Randy Credico) is Stuff's uncle who is from Living Island and the Krofft series, H.R. Pufnstuf
- Freddy (performed by Donna Kimball) is H.R. Pufnstuf's magic talking flute.
- Cling (performed by Arturo Gil) and Clang (performed by Joseph S. Griffo) are H.R. Pufnstuf's Rescue Racer Crew. Much like in the original series they come from, they never speak.
- Olive is a skunk that appears in the episode "Bring In Da Noise, Bring In Da Skunk". All the dogs were scared of her and they wouldn't get along. After Noodles disguised Olive, the dogs got along with Shirley (Olive in disguise). While Calvin and the dogs were dancing, Olive's dress fell off. All the dogs were scared, and Calvin got confused. The dogs did a nose-to-nose with Calvin, then they were not scared of Olive anymore, and they found out that they could keep her.
- Wally Whiskers is a comedian that appears in the episode, "Sit Stay, Stand Up"
- Meow Meow Kitty (portrayed by Jon Heder) is a villainous cat who takes over Mutt and Stuff.
- Simone Biles appears as herself in season 2, helping the dogs compete and win a gymnastics competition.
- Johnny in Charge (portrayed by Samm Levine) appears in multiple episodes, typically managing an event or attraction that the dogs visit.
- Enchanted Irving (portrayed by Josh Sussman) is a magician that visits Mutt & Stuff.

== Episodes ==
=== Series overview ===
Season	Episodes	Originally released	
Season	Episodes	First released	Last released
1	40	March 6, 2015	January 30, 2017
2	33	August 19, 2016	November 1, 2017

=== Season 1 (2015–2017) ===
No.	Title	Directed by	Written by	Original release date	Prod. code	U.S. viewers (millions)
0	"Pilot"	Hugh Martin	Bradley Zweig	March 6, 2015	100	N/A
Cesar Millan puts Calvin in charge of Mutt & Stuff. Ruby(the newest dog at Mutt & Stuff) won't take a bath & the group has to be at the Frisbee Festival.
1	"Hip Hop Dogs"	Hugh Martin	Dan Danko, Brian Elling & Corey Powell	July 10, 2015	101	1.31
Calvin helps one of the canine students cope with missing his owner. When a dog’s owner needs backup dancers for a performance, Calvin helps her out.
2	"A Pawsome Circus Show"	Christian Jacobs	Dan Danko	July 17, 2015	105	1.47
3	"Zippy's Birthday Bash"	Jason DeVilliers	Brian Elling	July 24, 2015	104	1.24
Calvin puts together a surprise birthday party for his best friend, Zippy; Cesar gives Calvin some great advice that helps him find the perfect gift for his friend.
4	"The Fast & The Furriest"	Christian Jacobs	Brian Elling	July 31, 2015	111	1.59
Vroom Vroom! It's Race Day at Mutt & Stuff, and Calvin has invited race dog extraordinaire Mario Bonedretti to join in on the racing fun. The dogs learn a thing or two about playing by the rules when it's revealed that Mario may not be the rule-abiding champion he's made out to be.
5	"Doggy Movin'"	Jason DeVilliers	Corey Powell	August 7, 2015	103	1.58
Calvin and the other dogs work to get Pixie moving when she won't come out of her carrier.
6	"Lady Woof Woof"	Jason DeVilliers	Corey Powell	August 14, 2015	110	1.33
A famous rockstar dog visits Mutt & Stuff.
7	"A Goldfish Opportunity"	Christian Jacobs	Brian Elling	August 21, 2015	106	1.08
Stuff gets a goldfish and learns how to take care of it.
8	"Class Picture Day"	Hugh Martin	Dan Danko	August 28, 2015	102	1.11
Today is the class Picture Day for Mutt and Stuff. Everyone will get to dress up for their picture. When Rocket and Princess Pickles are fighting over a pirate hat because they both want to be pirates for Picture Day, Calvin and Ceasar tell the two dogs to take turns.
9	"Doggy Dino"	Hugh Martin	Corey Powell	October 2, 2015	114	1.05
10	"Get Along Little Piggy"	Christian Jacobs	Dan Danko	October 13, 2015	112	1.18
The class welcomes a new student, a pig named Norman to Mutt & Stuff.
11	"Skate Doggin'"	Hugh Martin	Corey Powell & Brian D. Clark	October 15, 2015	117	1.01
Today is the day everyone gets to go to the skate park. However Rocket has never ridden a skateboard before and is a little nervous about skateboarding for the first time. Calvin helps Rocket overcome his nervousness and gets him on a skateboard.
12	"Ninja Dog"	Jason DeVilliers	Brian D. Clark	October 16, 2015	115	1.20
13	"Cloudy with a Chance of Accidents"	Jason DeVilliers	Dan Danko	November 10, 2015	108	0.87
14	"Achey Breaky Bark"	Jason DeVilliers	Corey Powell	November 12, 2015	109	1.02
15	"Veterinary Loves Company"	Hugh Martin	Brian D. Clark	November 13, 2015	113	0.89
When Mutt & Stuff began, Owen came up to Calvin and told him that his dog Sunny is a little nervous about his visit to the vet. Stuff appears to be nervous when Calvin told him that he is going to the vet too with Sunny. So to avoid going to the vet, Stuff does many needless things. Calvin and Ceasar manage to calm down the dogs by saying that dogs will react on how they're acting and that going to the vet isn't scary at all.
16	"I Bark of Genie"	Hugh Martin	Dan Danko	November 20, 2015	107	0.86
17	"A Very Mutty Christmas"	Jason DeVilliers	Brian D. Clark	December 11, 2015	124	0.92
Today is Christmas Eve at Mutt & Stuff. Calvin explains to Stuff that Little Cricket ( or Cricket as he was called) has never seen snow before. The class read a story about Phil the Snow Dog who can magically make snow for dogs who has Christmas spirit. When Stuff wishes for Cricket to see snow, it was magically snowing outside! The class all went to play in the snow and they found out that it was Phil the Snow Dog who makes snow at Mutt & Stuff because Stuff used his wish to wish for Cricket to see snow for the first time.
18	"Mutt & Stuff Express"	Hugh Martin	Dan Danko	January 5, 2016	119	1.13
19	"Cleo Kibble or Fix the Machine"	Hugh Martin	Evan Sinclair	January 7, 2016	120	1.06
When Calvin accidentally breaks the Bow Wow Chow Snack Machine trying to speed it up when he forgets snack time for the Mutt and Stuff picnic, he summons Cleo Kibble to help him fix the snack machine.
20	"Princess & the Cone"	Jason DeVilliers	Corey Powell	January 8, 2016	123	0.90
Today is Royal Day at Mutt & Stuff and everyone is excited, especially Princess Pickles. But Dr. Christina said that Princess Pickles has a rash and has to wear the cone for a whole week. The class tried playtime, snacktime, and dance class, but the cone seems to be in the way. Finally, they have arts & crafts and turn Princess Pickles' cone into a collar for a queen. The Royal Day begins and there's Sir Zippy, Stuff the dragon, King Rocket and finally Queen Pickles. They learn that you can make something that's in the way part of the fun.
21	"Take Me to your Pack Leader"	Jason DeVilliers	Evan Sinclair	January 15, 2016	116	0.90
At Mutt & Stuff, the class gets a special visit from an alien dog named Wagnoid from the planet Sniff. Wagnoid came to find out why Mutt & Stuff is the greatest dog school in the galaxy. When Stuff accidentally broke Wagnoid's ship, Calvin and the class volunteered to help fix Wagnoid's ship so he can fly home to planet Sniff.
22	"Game of Bones"	Hugh Martin	Dan Danko	January 22, 2016	118	1.18
Today is the day of the Doggy Olympics and Grumbles is afraid that he might not do well in the Doggy Games. Calvin's younger cousin Marco volunteered to watch the other dogs and Stuff while Calvin helps Grumbles get over his fear of competing in the Doggy Olympics.
23	"Dogs on a Plane"	Hugh Martin	Brian D. Clark	January 29, 2016	121	1.07
The dogs take a plane ride to Hawaii.
24	"H.R. Pufnstuf Visits Mutt & Stuff"	Hugh Martin	Amara Nolan	February 15, 2016	125	N/A
The class is getting ready for the arrival of Stuff's uncle H.R. Pufnstuf. When Pufnstuf arrives, Calvin shows him Mutt and Stuff. Stuff thinks that he's not important to his uncle. In the end, Calvin made Stuff the mayor of Mutt and Stuff to show Stuff that he's important too.
25	"Welcome Noodles!"	Hugh Martin	Evan Sinclair	February 23, 2016	127	N/A
Calvin and the dogs try to include their new class pet, a mouse named Noodles in all of their activities.
26	"Lights! Camera! Bark!"	Christian Jacobs	Evan Sinclair	February 25, 2016	128	N/A
The class makes a movie starring themselves. Guest starring Oscar Nunez
27	"Sherdog Bones"	Jason DeVilliers	Julia Prescott	March 8, 2016	122	N/A
When things starts to go missing, Calvin and the dogs become detectives to solve the mystery and get their stuffs back. Note: This brings the return of Junior Shades as a student at Mutt & Stuff instead of a co-pilot.
28	"Goat in 60 Seconds!"	Hugh Martin	Evan Sinclair	March 10, 2016	132	N/A
When Stuff loses Jenny Jasper's prize-winning goat, Bubba, the class tried to find Bubba for the cutest goat competition.
29	"Pool Party"	Hugh Martin	Brian D. Clark	June 10, 2016	140	N/A
It's a hot day today, so Calvin & the dogs go to the indoor pool! But Rocket doesn't follow any of the rules.
30	"Super Doggy Adoption"	Hugh Martin	Julia Prescott	July 22, 2016	126	1.42
31	"Puppy Pirates!"	Shannon Flynn	Brian D. Clark	July 29, 2016	133	N/A
32	"Amusement Bark"	Christian Jacobs	Corey Powell	August 5, 2016	129	N/A
Stuff finds it hard to wait his turn while at Doggy Fun Land
33	"World Pup"	Hugh Martin	Evan Sinclair	August 12, 2016	131	N/A
34	"Gabi's Groom-A-Thon"	Christian Jacobs	Brian D. Clark	August 30, 2016	130	N/A
35	"Dogs in Space"	Hugh Martin	Evan Sinclair	September 1, 2016	139	N/A
36	"Ruffin' It Camping"	Jason DeVilliers	Dan Danko	September 20, 2016	135	N/A
The dogs go camping at Mutt & Stuff.
37	"Ba-a-a-ack To School!"	Christian Jacobs	Corey Powell	September 22, 2016	138	N/A
Two sheep unexpectedly visit Mutt & Stuff!
38	"Sick As A Dog"	Jason DeVilliers	Dan Danko	October 4, 2016	136	N/A
Calvin has come down with a cold! So, Stuff and Marco needed a way to help make Calvin feel better and operate Mutt & Stuff for him.
39	"Dinner With Cesar"	Christian Jacobs	Evan Sinclair	October 6, 2016	137	0.84
The class shows Cesar how thankful they are to have him by making a surprise dinner for him.
40	"Fire Dogs"	Shannon Flynn	Dan Danko	January 30, 2017	134	0.75
Fireman Fred and his fire dog, Dotti, visit the dog school in a real fire truck to teach the students all about fire safety

=== Season 2 (2016–2017) ===
No.	Title	Directed by	Written by	Original release date	Prod. code	U.S. viewers (millions)
41	"Basketball Dogs vs. the Harlem Globetrotters"	Hugh Martin	Dan Danko	August 19, 2016	206	1.07
Stuff accidentally messages the Harlem Globetrotters to play against them! He thinks his lucky Murray the Walrus will bring them good luck, but he goes missing!
42	"The Happy Hallowoof Party"	Jason DeVilliers	Brian D. Clark	October 21, 2016	220	1.08
Calvin and the dogs host a large Halloween costume party. However, Cuddles does not get an invitation in the mailbox and feels sad, believing he was left out.
43	"Bring In Da Noise, Bring In Da Skunk"	Hugh Martin	Corey Powell	January 31, 2017	202	0.78
Noodles invites his forest friend Olive the Skunk to visit. Because the dogs are initially scared of skunks, Noodles disguises Olive as a dog named Shirley to teach the class a lesson about not judging others by their fur.
44	"Doggy Adventure Day"	Christian Jacobs	Brian D. Clark	February 1, 2017	204	0.75
45	"Sit, Stay, Stand Up!"	Hugh Martin	Dan Danko	February 2, 2017	205	0.82
46	"Roller Dogs"	Christian Jacobs	Corey Powell	March 13, 2017	203	1.24
Calvin tries to find a way out of roller-skating.
47	"Grandma's Day Off"	Christian Jacobs	Evan Sinclair	March 14, 2017	211	1.00
48	"Annie To The Rescue"	Hugh Martin	Evan Sinclair	March 15, 2017	209	1.03
49	"Doggy Dining Disaster!"	Hugh Martin	Corey Powell	March 16, 2017	213	1.01
50	"Doggy Mermaid Island"	Hugh Martin	Brian D. Clark	March 17, 2017	210	1.04
51	"Cowboy"	Hugh Martin	Evan Sinclair	May 1, 2017	201	0.75
A new student at Mutt & Stuff named Cowboy arrives. But he's a bossy dog, and makes everyone do what he wants to do.
52	"H.R. Pufnstuf's Happy Tree Jamboree"	Jason DeVilliers	Brian D. Clark	May 2, 2017	207	0.71
It's the Blooming Tree Jamboree! But the trees Sid and Marty planted have not grown any flowers. Stuff tries to make them grow for his uncle not to be disappointed, but then he learns an important lesson on honesty.
53	"Putt & Stuff"	Jason DeVilliers	Dan Danko	May 3, 2017	208	0.77
When Noodles the Mouse secretly helps Sunny win every hole, they ultimately learn that it is better to practice and work hard to learn a new skill.
54	"Woof Out!"	Christian Jacobs	Dan Danko	May 4, 2017	212	0.82
Buddy Sitandshake gets overwhelmed while competing in a new doggy game show competing against Peter Poodlerino, but his friends step in to help him overcome his struggles and win the grand prize.
55	"The Wag 4 Rock Concert"	Hugh Martin	Evan Sinclair	June 19, 2017	214	1.18
Gabby Groomer gets nervous when trying out singing for the Wag 4.
56	"A Chew Toy Fairy-Tail"	Jason DeVilliers	Brian D. Clark	June 20, 2017	215	1.20
57	"Hocus Puppy Pocus"	Jason DeVilliers	Corey Powell	June 21, 2017	216	1.17
Stuff accidentally turns Calvin into a chicken!
58	"Dog Star Challenge"	Hugh Martin	Evan Sinclair	June 22, 2017	217	1.20
59	"Doggy Gymnastics!"	Christian Jacobs	Dan Danko & Evan Sinclair	July 14, 2017	231	1.17
60	"Construction Dogs!"	Hugh Martin	Evan Sinclair & Margaret Hoffman	July 17, 2017	218	1.31
61	"Hop Dog"	Christian Jacobs	Dan Danko	July 18, 2017	219	1.24
62	"The Woof Zone!"	Hugh Martin	Evan Sinclair	July 19, 2017	221	1.26
63	"Superhero Dogs!"	Hugh Martin	Dan Danko	July 20, 2017	222	1.17
64	"Surprise Birthday Balloon Bash!"	Jason DeVilliers	Corey Powell	August 7, 2017	224	1.13
65	"Twin Day!"	Shannon Flynn	Sindy Boveda-Spackman	August 8, 2017	225	1.05
66	"Get Up And Bark!"	Christian Jacobs	Corey Powell	August 9, 2017	226	1.02
67	"CannonDOG Run!"	Christian Jacobs	Dan Danko	August 10, 2017	227	1.02
68	"The Dog Boat!"	Jason DeVilliers	Brian D. Clark	October 2, 2017	223	0.40
69	"Pixie, I Shrunk the Class!"	Hugh Martin	Sindy Boveda-Spackman	October 3, 2017	228	0.46
70	"Woofing 9 to 5"	Hugh Martin	Brian D. Clark	October 4, 2017	229	0.38
71	"Dog Submarine!"	Jason DeVilliers	Evan Sinclair	October 5, 2017	230	0.42
72	"Doggy Safari!"	Hugh Martin	Jacob Moffat	October 30, 2017	232	0.59
73	"Choo Choo Trouble"	Unknown	Brian D. Clark & Corey Powell	November 1, 2017	233	0.57

== Awards ==
2016: Mutt & Stuff was nominated for two Daytime Emmy Awards for Outstanding Pre-School Children's Series and Outstanding Directing in a Children's or Preschool Children's Series
