= Pocho (crocodile) =

Costa Rican pet crocodile (ca.1950–2011)

Pocho (c. 1950–1960 – 12 October 2011) was an American crocodile from Costa Rica who gained international attention for his relationship of over 20 years with Gilberto "Chito" Shedden, a local fisherman who found Pocho dying on the banks of the Reventazón River and nursed him back to health. The crocodile refused to return to the wild and chose to stay with Chito. The pair became famous after they began performing together. The 2013 documentary Touching the Dragon details their relationship.

== Discovery of Pocho ==
Chito, a fisherman, tour guide, and naturalist from Siquirres, Limón Province, Costa Rica, discovered an emaciated and dehydrated male crocodile weighing 70 kg (150 lb) on the banks of the Reventazón River in 1989. Upon closer examination, Shedden discovered that the crocodile had been shot in the head through the left eye by a local cattle farmer because the crocodile had been preying on a herd of cows. Shedden took the crocodile home in his boat along with the reluctant help of some friends.

For six months, Shedden fed the crocodile 30 kg (66 lb) of chicken and fish a week, sleeping with it at night in his home. Shedden also simulated the chewing of food with his mouth to encourage the crocodile to eat, and gave it kisses and hugs while talking to it and petting it. Shedden later stated his belief that providing food alone would not have helped it recover, and that "the crocodile needed my love to regain the will to live".

Shedden hid the crocodile in an obscured pond with a thick overhead canopy of trees deep in a nearby forest until he obtained the necessary wildlife permits from Costa Rican authorities to own and raise the crocodile legally.

== Improved health ==
After the crocodile's health improved, Shedden released the crocodile - now named Pocho, meaning "strong" in the local dialect - in a nearby river to return it to the wild but the crocodile refused to go back to its natural habitat, and so Shedden decided to allow the crocodile to live in the water outside his home. Pocho was considered a member of his family, alongside Shedden's wife and daughter.

Shedden trained the crocodile to respond to its own name being called. For more than twenty years, Shedden swam with the crocodile in the river outside his home, mostly at night, talking and playing with Pocho while hugging, kissing and caressing him.

== Public performances ==
For more than a decade, Chito and Pocho performed a weekly act on Sunday afternoons in a 100 m^{2} (1,100 sq ft) artificial lake at Finca Las Tilapias in his hometown of Siquirres, Costa Rica, performing in the water for tourists from around the world. The 2014 video documentary Dragon's Feast was made about Chito and Pocho by South African wildlife cinematographer Roger Horrocks shortly before Pocho's death. Horrocks speculated in his documentary that the gunshot wound to Pocho's head might have damaged the crocodile's brain, whereby the usual instinctive behavior of the crocodile changed as a result. Horrocks, noting examples where humans had been attacked by their reptilian pets even after a decade or more of close ownership, felt that Shedden's life was always in danger when he stepped into the water with the crocodile. To this, Shedden stated: "After two or three years, something could happen, maybe... but after 23 years of loving each other, nothing has ever happened, so I don't think so."

One of Pocho's behaviors was to rush at Shedden with his mouth open when he entered the water, before closing his mouth before he got too close, allowing a kiss on his snout instead.

== Death and legacy ==
Pocho died of natural causes in the water outside Shedden's home in Siquirres on 12 October 2011. Following a public funeral held for the crocodile, which was attended by friends and admirers, Shedden sang to the crocodile while holding its 'hand'. Pocho's taxidermied remains are on permanent display behind glass in the Siquirres town museum, which Shedden visits often.

Shedden later befriended a new crocodile, which he named Pocho II. Chito had frequently encountered the crocodile on the river near his house while fishing and had brought the crocodile food, while the crocodile allowed him to pet it; however, the prospects of long-term success with Pocho II remain uncertain as the circumstances are not the same as Shedden's relationship with the original Pocho.
