= The Garage =

The Garage may refer to:

== Places ==
- The Garage (retail), a shopping center located in Harvard Square, Cambridge, Massachusetts
- The Garage, Glasgow, a night club located in Glasgow, Scotland
- The Garage at Northwestern University, student innovation space on the campus of Northwestern University in Evanston, Illinois
- The Garage (London), a music venue in London, England
- The Garage (Winston-Salem), a concert venue located in Winston-Salem, North Carolina
- The Garage, nickname for General Motors Place in Vancouver, Canada, home arena for the Canucks
- The Garage (Burnsville, Minnesota), a youth center and music venue in Burnsville, Minnesota
- The Garage (Singapore), a historic building and restaurant in Singapore

== Entertainment ==
- The Garage (1920 film), a 1920 Fatty Arbuckle / Buster Keaton silent comedy short
- The Garage (1923 film), starring Stan Laurel
- The Garage (1979 film), a 1979 film by Eldar Ryazanov
- The Garage (2006 film), a coming-of-age drama starring Martin Donovan and Xander Berkeley
- The Garage (TV series), a television show about English Mobile Mechanics, currently showing on the UK Discovery Channel
- The Garage, a 2012 album by Slagsmålsklubben

== See also ==
- Garage (disambiguation)
