= The Sheriff (1918 film) =

1918 film

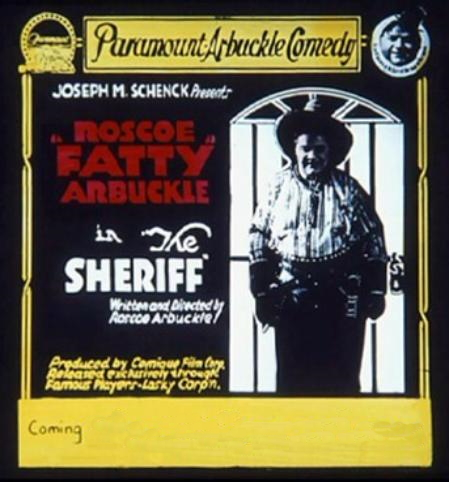
- Film poster
- Directed by: Roscoe Arbuckle
- Written by: Roscoe Arbuckle
- Produced by: Comique Film Company; Joseph Schenck
- Starring: Roscoe Arbuckle
- Distributed by: Paramount Pictures
- Release date: November 24, 1918
- Running time: 18 minutes
- Country: United States
- Language: Silent (English intertitles)

The Sheriff is a 1918 American short comedy film directed by and starring Roscoe "Fatty" Arbuckle. The film is considered to be lost.

== Plot ==
Arbuckle plays a sheriff who admires the screen heroics of Douglas Fairbanks and William S. Hart. After dreaming of a dramatic rescue, he has to attempt a real one when his schoolteacher girlfriend is kidnapped by a bandit.

== Cast ==
- Roscoe "Fatty" Arbuckle as Cook
- Betty Compson as School Teacher
- Monty Banks (credited as his real name Mario Bianchi)
- Glen Cavender
- Luke the Dog
- Ernest Morrison
- Mildred Reardon as Lady
