= Garage =

A garage is a covered structure built for the purpose of parking, storing, protecting, maintaining, and/or repairing vehicles. Specific applications include:

- Garage (residential), a building or part of a building for storing one or more vehicles
- Automobile repair shop, also called a garage, where vehicles are serviced and repaired
- Bus garage, a building or complex used for storage of buses when not in use
- Filling station, an automotive service station where vehicles take on fuel or recharge
- Multistorey car park, or parking garage, a building serving as a public parking facility

Other meanings of garage may include:

== Arts, entertainment, and media ==
=== Films ===
- Garage (film), 2007, by Lenny Abrahamson
- The Garage (1920 film), a film by Roscoe Arbuckle
- The Garage (1980 film), a film by Eldar Ryazanov

=== Video game ===
- Garage (video game), a 1999 Japanese horror adventure video game

=== Music ===
==== Groups and genres ====
- Garage (band), a Czech rock band
- Garage house, a form of dance music that emerged in the 1980s
- UK garage (also known as simply "garage"), a form of dance music that emerged in the 1990s
- Garage rock, a form of rock and roll that emerged in the 1960s

==== Albums ====
- Garage (album), 2005, by Cross Canadian Ragweed
- Garage Inc., a 1998 compilation of cover songs by Metallica

=== Periodicals ===
- Garage (fanzine), a 1980s music fanzine from New Zealand
- Garage Magazine, a biannual publication dedicated to contemporary art and fashion

== Brands and enterprises ==
- Garage (clothing retailer), a US/Canadian retailer for teenage girls
- Garage (drink), a Finnish alcopop drink
- Garage Museum of Contemporary Art, Moscow
- Paradise Garage, also known as "the Garage" or the "Gay-rage", a now-defunct New York City discotheque located in a parking garage

== See also ==
- GarageBand, a music production software application published by Apple Computer
