= Fatty's Faithful Fido =

1915 film

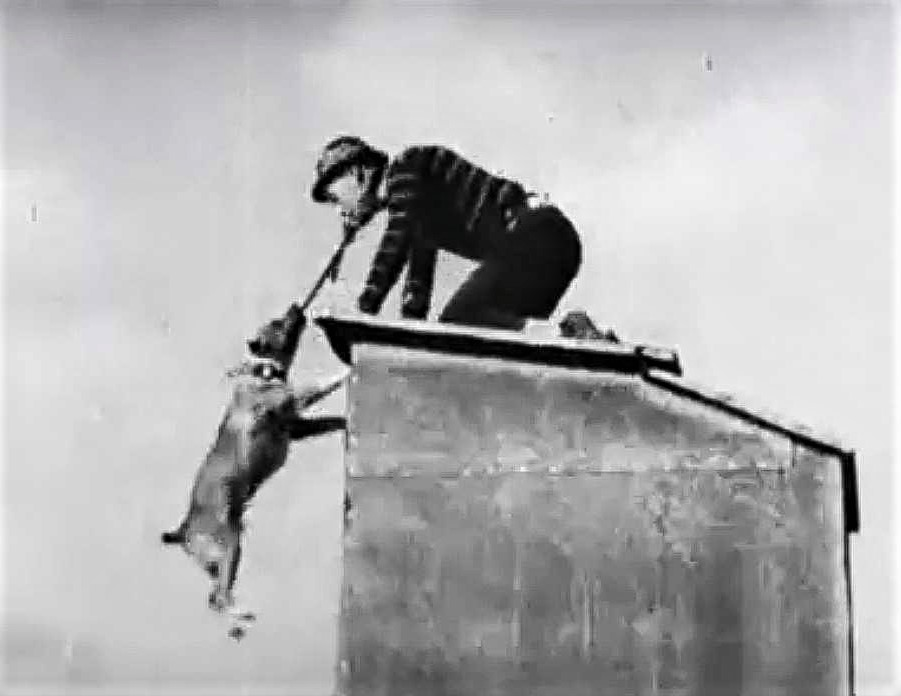
- Fatty’s dog Luke and Al St. John in Fatty's Faithful Fido (1915)
- Directed by: Fatty Arbuckle
- Produced by: Mack Sennett
- Starring: Fatty Arbuckle
- Release date: March 14, 1915
- Running time: 13 minutes
- Country: United States
- Languages: Silent; English intertitles

Fatty's Faithful Fido is a 1915 American short comedy film directed by and starring Fatty Arbuckle. The silent movie, from the Keystone Film Company, has no onscreen cast and crew credits. The copyright credits Mack Sennett.

== Cast ==
- Roscoe "Fatty" Arbuckle
- Minta Durfee
- Al St. John
- Joe Bordeaux
- Glen Cavender
- Luke the Dog
- Ted Edwards
- Frank Hayes
- Leo White

== See also ==
- Fatty Arbuckle filmography
