= Mabel and Fatty's Wash Day =

1915 film

- Full film
- Directed by: Fatty Arbuckle
- Produced by: Mack Sennett, Keystone Film Company
- Starring: Fatty Arbuckle, Mabel Normand
- Release date: January 14, 1915
- Running time: 13 minutes
- Country: United States
- Language: Silent (English intertitles)

Mabel and Fatty's Wash Day is a 1915 American silent comedy short or "one-reeler" directed by Fatty Arbuckle and co-starring Arbuckle and Mabel Normand.

== Plot ==
This short begins with Mabel toiling in the kitchen, handwashing clothes while her shiftless husband lies in bed in the adjacent room and refuses to assist her. She even throws a pan of water on him, but he still refuses to help. Next door it is wash day too for Fatty, who glumly scrubs clothes as his wife, like Mabel's spouse, carps at him from the bedroom and is unwilling to lend a hand. Mabel and Fatty soon meet outdoors while drying their laundry. As he helps her wring a garment, the house smock worn by Mabel is caught between the rollers of Fatty's drying tub and is nearly pulled from her body. Mabel's husband witnesses the incident, confronts his portly neighbor, and warns him to keep away from his wife.

Later, each couple goes out for a stroll in the park. Fatty's wife falls asleep on a bench as he reads to her from the January 1915 Blue Book magazine. Elsewhere in the park, on another bench, Mabel and her husband begin arguing; and she stalks off, forgetting to take her purse. Mabel sees Fatty and after they share complaints about their spouses, the two go to a nearby open-air cafe for refreshments. There they realize they have no money, so Fatty leaves to get his napping wife's purse. Returning to the cafe, he pays the waiter for some drinks. Mabel's husband in the meantime searches for her in the park while carrying her purse. As he passes Fatty's wife, she wakes up, finds her purse missing, and sees Mabel's husband walking away and carrying a purse. She calls two policemen, who, along with Fatty's wife, chase him to the cafe where Mabel and Fatty are still sitting. Fights commence with slaps, flailing purses, and police nightsticks being wildly applied. The film ends with Fatty being pummeled by the cops and his wife and Mabel leading her husband away by his ear.

== Cast ==
- Mabel Normand as Mabel
- Roscoe "Fatty” Arbuckle as Fatty
- Harry McCoy as Mabel's Nagging Husband
- Alice Davenport as Fatty's Nagging Wife
- Joe Bordeaux as Cop (uncredited)
- Luke the Dog (uncredited)
- Edgar Kennedy as the cafe waiter (uncredited)

== See also ==
- Fatty Arbuckle filmography
