= Phil Hanes =

American businessman and conservationist

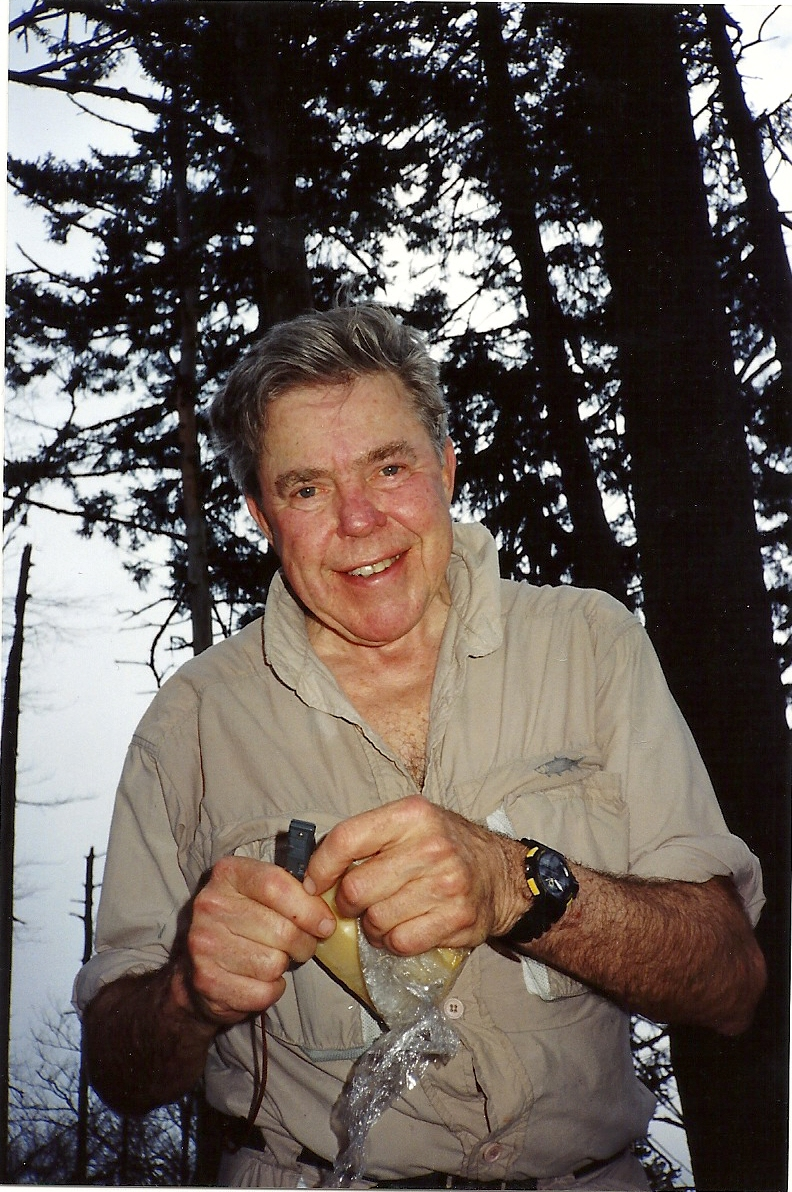
- Hanes in Alaska in 1992
- Born: Ralph Philip Hanes Jr. February 25, 1926; Winston-Salem, North Carolina, U.S.
- Died: January 18, 2011 (aged 84); Winston-Salem, North Carolina, U.S.

Ralph Philip Hanes Jr. (February 25, 1926 – January 16, 2011), was an American businessman, conservationist, and patron of the arts. He was CEO of the Hanes Corporation from 1964 to 1976, and founder of Ampersand Inc., a consulting firm for non-profit organizations. Hanes donated the land that became Stone Mountain State Park to the state of North Carolina, served as chairman for the National Endowment for the Arts, and the University of North Carolina School of the Arts board.

== Early life ==
Hanes was born in Winston-Salem, North Carolina, to DeWitt Chatham Hanes and Ralph Philip Hanes Sr. The Hanes family were involved as patrons to the local community when Phil was a child, with his father financing the restoration of Old Salem. His uncle, Frederick Moir Hanes, was a friend of American satirist H. L. Mencken. Hanes attended Woodberry Forest School before attending UNC Chapel Hill, where he enrolled in the V-12 Navy College Training Program, and was later transferred to the Naval Reserve Officers Training Corps. Hanes soon left UNC for Yale, where he became a member of The Whiffenpoofs, touring across the Americas and Europe. In addition to a major in English, Hanes took Art Appreciation while at Yale. Hanes graduated with a bachelor's degree in 1949. The following year, on January 14 he married his first wife, Joan Audrey Humpstone.

== Career ==
After graduating from Yale in 1949, Hanes returned to North Carolina to work at the family business Hanes Dye and Finishing. His father Ralph was CEO at the time, and sent Phil to work for Springs Cotton Mills, a competing textile company, which had a well respected training program for prospective executives within the textile industry. The program saw Hanes working all the floor-level positions within the Springs' factories, running every machine in the plant, working all three shifts, and living in towns such as Lancaster, South Carolina which according to Hanes "...had one grocery store, one filling station, one drugstore, and one movie house." Phil came back to Winston-Salem after completing the program with Springs' to work in the offices of Hanes, of which he says that he, "...had to do every job in the office. I did everything but sweep the floor." He moved up the corporate ladder once there, going from being an office drone and traveling salesman all the way to being vice president, president, and by 1964, CEO. During his tenure as CEO, he oversaw the company's push for desegregation, successfully integrating the facilities for both white and African-American workers. In 1976, at the age of fifty, Hanes resigned from his position, giving the role to his Nephew and the President of the company at the time, though he remained invested in the business as a chairman of the board and the second largest stockholder. The business was sold to Leggett & Platt for $65 million in 1993.

== Arts and activism ==
The same year that Hanes returned to Winston-Salem to work in the family business, he was approached by the newly formed Winston-Salem Arts Council, which needed people on its board, and asked to join. Hanes financed the foundation of the Southeastern Center for Contemporary Art in 1956, and later worked with the organization as chairman at Ampersand Inc. In 1963, Hanes was one of the founders of the University of North Carolina School of the Arts, as well as serving on the board of trustees under the first president, Vittorio Giannini. In 1965, Lyndon B. Johnson appointed Hanes to the National Endowment for the Arts council, with the likes of John Steinbeck, Duke Ellington, and Harper Lee. Picnicking with his wife in the 1950s by Stone Mountain in North Carolina, Hanes observed a nearby couple littering; upon asking them not do so, the couple informed him that the land was owned by a relative, and if he took issue with the littering he ought to leave. Hanes purchased the land, 80 acres, for $10,000, and over the next two decades purchased thousands of acres more of the surrounding area. Hanes donated that land, which would become Stone Mountain State Park, to the state government in 1975. He also purchased and preserved 9,000 acres around Mount Mitchell and 30,000 acres along ten miles of the New River. In 1979 Hanes co-founded the Awards in the Visual Arts program. Starting in the 1980s and continuing into the 21st century, Hanes invested more extensively in the local arts scene in Winston-Salem, participating in local arts councils, and helping in the foundation of establishments such as The Garage and The Werehouse.

== Personal life ==
Hanes' wife Joan Humpstone Hanes died in 1983. He later met Mary Charlotte Metz and the two were married in December of the 1984. At the age of 80, he incorporated his life's lessons in his first book How to Get Anyone to do Anything. In addition to contributions to ecological conservation, Hanes developed a passion for the study of mushrooms after a friend gifted him a book on mushrooms in 1960, and became a member of the North American Mycological Association in August of the following year. Hanes died at the age of 84, in his native Winston-Salem on January 16, 2011. His ashes have been installed in the sculpture "Conversations" on the campus of University of North Carolina School of the Arts.

== Awards and honors ==
- 1982 National Governor's Association Award for Distinguished Service to the Arts
- 1982 North Carolina Award in Fine Arts
- 1991 National Medal of Arts (presented by President Bush)
