= Fatty's Plucky Pup =

1915 film

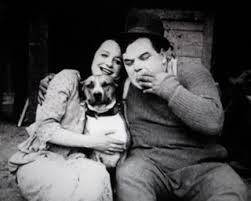
- Film still
- Directed by: Fatty Arbuckle
- Produced by: Mack Sennett
- Starring: Fatty Arbuckle
- Music by: Rodney Sauer
- Production company: Keystone Studios
- Distributed by: Mutual Film
- Release date: June 28, 1915
- Running time: 26 minutes
- Country: United States
- Languages: Silent; English intertitles

Fatty's Plucky Pup is a 1915 American short comedy film directed by and starring Fatty Arbuckle. A print of the film survives.

== Plot ==
Fatty plays a somewhat lazy young man who disrupts his mother's life by causing a fire by smoking in bed, then ruins laundry day by dropping it in the mud. He has two loves of his life, the girl next door Lizzie and his dog Luke. After showcasing his lack of talents helping his mother, he is able to save Luke from the dog catchers and express his love for Lizzie through a hole in the fence. In the second reel, Fatty, Lizzie, mom and Luke go to the amusement park, where Fatty is first outwitted by a couple of sharks but then retrieves his losses by pointing a fake gun at them. To exact revenge, they kidnap Lizzie with the help of the embittered dog catchers, and take her to an abandoned shack, where they tie her to a post with a gun attached to a timer pointed at her head. Plucky pup Luke follows the crooks, and is able to warn Fatty in time to perform the last-minute rescue, with the help of the Keystone Cops. In the closing shot Fatty, Lizzie and Luke embrace in a joint kiss (and lick).

== Cast ==
- Roscoe "Fatty" Arbuckle as Fatty
- Phyllis Allen as Fatty's mother
- Joe Bordeaux as Kennedy's partner
- Luke the Dog as Luke
- Edgar Kennedy as Shell game operator
- Hank Mann
- Josephine Stevens as Lizzie
- Al St. John as Dog catcher
- Ted Edwards as Hired Thug (uncredited)

== See also ==
- List of American films of 1915
- Fatty Arbuckle filmography
