= The Knockout =

1914 film by Charles Avery

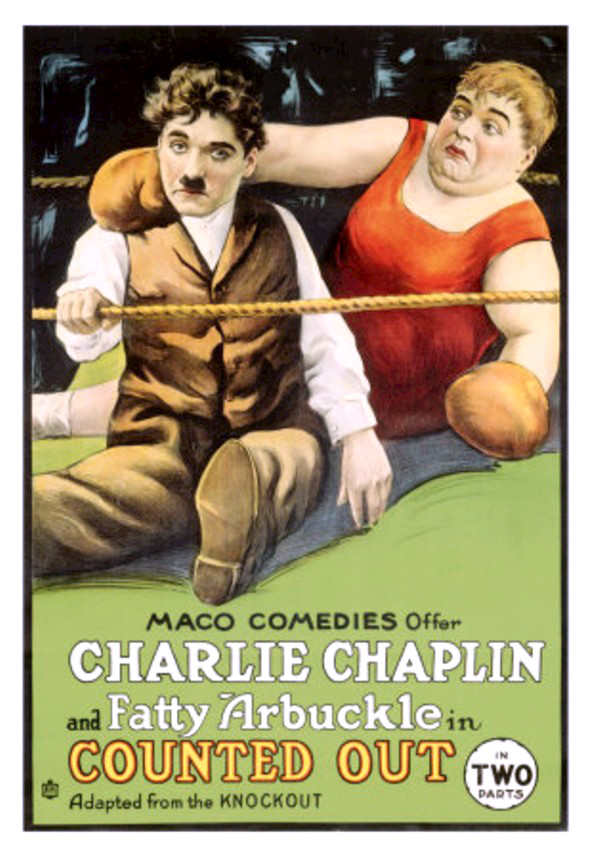
- Theatrical poster
- Directed by: Charles Avery
- Produced by: Mack Sennett
- Starring: Roscoe "Fatty" Arbuckle; Minta Durfee; Edgar Kennedy; Charlie Chaplin; Frank Opperman; Al St. John; Hank Mann; Mack Swain
- Cinematography: Frank D. Williams
- Production company: Keystone Studios
- Distributed by: Mutual Film
- Release date: June 11, 1914
- Running time: 27 minutes
- Country: United States
- Languages: Silent film English (Original titles)

The Knockout

The Knockout is a 1914 American silent comedy film starring Roscoe "Fatty" Arbuckle. It also features Charlie Chaplin in a small role, his seventeenth film for Keystone Studios. It is one of only a few films in which Chaplin's Little Tramp character appears in a secondary role, not appearing until the second half of the film. It also stars Arbuckle's wife, Minta Durfee, Edgar Kennedy and Keystone owner, Mack Sennett in a minor role as a spectator. The film was directed by Charles Avery.

== Plot ==
Two down-and-out hoboes pretend to be pugilists in order to make some money to eat. One of them claims to be Cyclone Flynn, the boxing champion. In the meantime Pug, a good-hearted local strongman, has fought and defeated several mashers who were bothering his girlfriend. The mashers make up with Pug and propose to enter him to fight the fake Cyclone Flynn at a local theater.

Enter the real Cyclone Flynn, who expels the hoboes and takes over the engagement. The fight starts, comically refereed by Chaplin's character. It quickly deteriorates into chaos, after Pug steals a gambler's revolvers and chases the champion from the ring. A long chase sequence involving the boxers, spectators, Pug's girlfriend, and the Keystone Kops follows.

== Cast ==
- Roscoe "Fatty" Arbuckle - Pug
- Minta Durfee - Pug's girlfriend
- Edgar Kennedy - Cyclone Flynn
- Charlie Chaplin - Referee
- Frank Opperman - Fight promoter
- Al St. John - Pug's rival
- Hank Mann - Tough
- Mack Swain - Gambler
- Alice Howell – uncredited
- Luke the Dog – uncredited

== Reception ==
A reviewer from Moving Picture World wrote, "Roscoe Arbuckle, ably supported, makes barrels of fun in this two-reel comedy release. In its early stages, the story has a particularly well connected plot, but things go to smash a little in this line when a big chase is introduced in the second reel. This chase, as well as a comedy prize fight, is unusually funny."

== See also ==
- Charlie Chaplin filmography
- Fatty Arbuckle filmography
- List of boxing films
