= Luke the Dog =

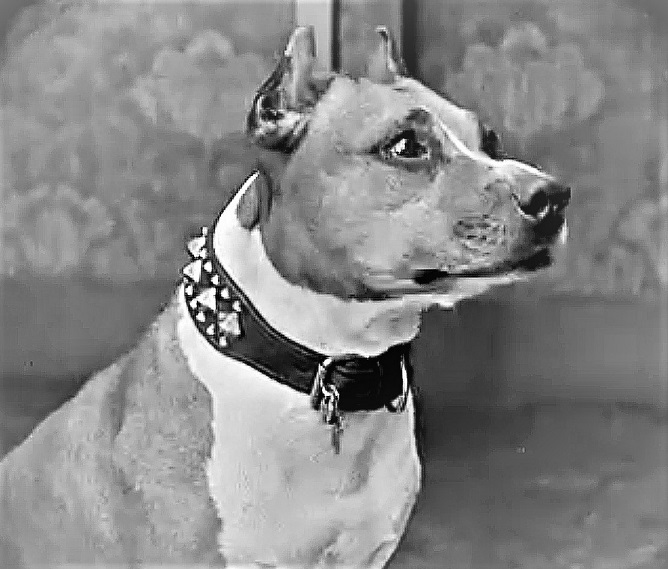
- Luke in the Buster Keaton short The Scarecrow (1920)
- First appearance: 1914
- Last appearance: 1920

In-universe information
- Species: Dog; American Pit Bull Terrier, a breed descended from the Bull-and-terrier of England
- Gender: Male

Luke the Dog (1913–1926) was an American Pit Bull Terrier (Note: Until 1936, the American Kennel Club (AKC) did not register dogs of Luke's type as its own specific breed in the United States, as well as The Kennel Club in England until 1935. Only the United Kennel Club (since 1898) and the American Dog Breeders Association (since 1909) registered such dogs as a specific breed named American Pit Bull Terrier. In 1936, the AKC registered the breed and changed its name to Staffordshire Terrier, and in 1969 revised the breed's name and changed it to American Staffordshire Terrier (registered in the USA in 1936) to distinguish it from its British counterpart named Staffordshire Bull Terrier (registered in England in 1935).) that performed as a recurring character in American silent comedy shorts between 1914 and 1920. He was also the personal pet of actress Minta Durfee and her husband, the comedian and director Roscoe "Fatty" Arbuckle.

For six years Luke gained widespread popularity among movie audiences, appearing in one- and two-reelers for Keystone Studios, Comique Film Company, and Joseph M. Schenck Productions. The Staffordshire terrier shared screen time not only with Arbuckle and Durfee but also with other stars and top supporting players of the silent era, including Mabel Normand, Buster Keaton, Al St. John, Molly Malone, Joe Roberts, Betty Compson, and Edgar Kennedy.

== Early life ==
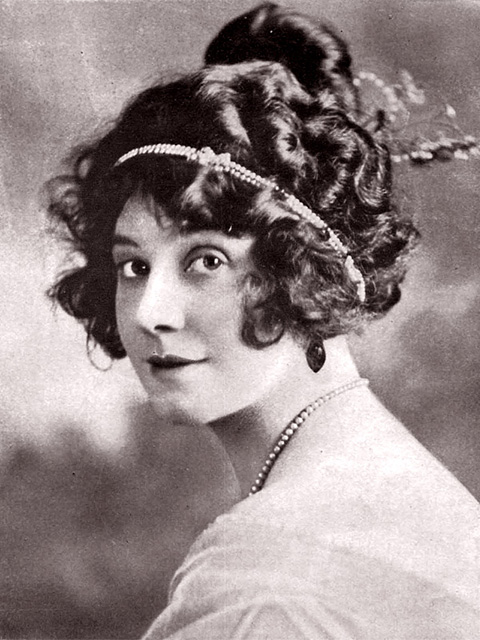
Minta Durfee, Luke's owner and wife of Fatty Arbuckle, 1915

Luke the Dog was born in November 1913, reportedly at the home of film director Wilfred Lucas in Los Angeles, California. It was there where Minta Durfee and Roscoe Arbuckle were said to have acquired Luke as a six-week-old puppy. Several sources about the dog's early life state that Lucas gave the puppy to Minta in lieu of extra money or hazard pay she had earned for performing a dangerous stunt in one of his motion pictures. Some of those same sources also state that Minta and Roscoe even named their new pet after the tight-fisted director, dubbing him Luke as a familiar form of "Lucas" The cited timing of the dog's birth in November 1913 seems consistent with Luke's relatively small physical appearance in his brief film debut in the short The Knockout, released in June 1914 and featuring both Roscoe and Minta. In the short Lover's Luck, released three months later, Luke can be seen in the background in several scenes, tethered next to a doghouse. Luke's size in that film shows a dog of his breed nearing maturity.

== Film career ==
While Luke was originally given to Minta Durfee, Roscoe Arbuckle quickly became the dominant figure in the dog's daily life, for it was "Fatty" who invested the most time training the animal to do tricks. Following his debut in The Knockout, released by Keystone in June 1914, Luke worked in no fewer than 13 more shorts produced between September 1914 and December 1920. Luke next appears in Lover's Luck (1914) and then in Mabel and Fatty's Wash Day (1915). He has very little screen time in the latter one-reeler, receiving only a few affectionate pats in one scene from actress Mabel Normand as her character goes into the backyard to hang laundry. Following Luke's fourth screen appearance in Fatty's New Role (1915), the success of his training and his remarkable athleticism are finally and fully displayed to audiences in the March 1915 release Fatty's Faithful Fido.

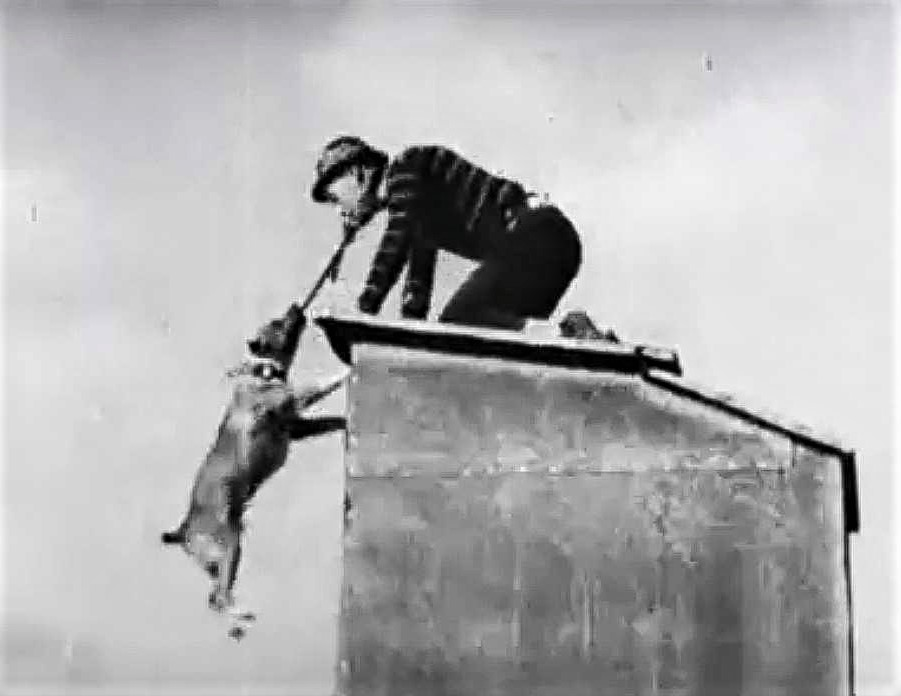
Luke catches Al St. John in Fatty's Faithful Fido (1915).

Luke performs a series of stunts in Fatty's Faithful Fido that are among the most impressive of his career. He gives chase to fellow cast member Al St. John, who in the one-reeler plays Fatty's rival for the affections of a young woman portrayed by Minta. In his pursuit of St. John, Luke climbs a tall ladder propped against a wall, missteps and plunges off a building's roof, recovers, crosses another ladder between rooftops, jumps from one roof to another, seizes between his teeth the coat of Fatty's rival and rips it off his body, and then grabs the desperate man's necktie and starts choking him. St. John finally manages to escape but only when Luke is distracted by a passing cat. Later in the day the dog locates him at a community dance and charges into the event. The film ends with Luke, St. John, and Fatty falling through a hole in the floor and landing together in a large laundry tub of water.

Luke has his longest screen time in a single film in Fatty's Plucky Pup, which was initially distributed to theaters on June 28, 1915. Earlier that same month the widely read, New York-based trade journal Reel Life had reported that "Fatty, his wife [Minta] and Luke are among the most popular photoplayers in California". With specific regard to Luke, the dog's talents and recognized popularity by that time are exemplified by his numerous stunts in Fatty's Plucky Pup. In this 26-minute two-reeler he performs in almost every scene. In the comedy's opening footage, Luke proves to be a very elusive target for two dogcatchers; and later the "plucky pup" becomes a hero, rescuing Fatty's girlfriend Lizzie from a pair of crooks who are assisted by the two dogcatchers. One of the interesting visual effects in Fatty's Plucky Pup relied on the use of a treadmill in combination with the carousel-like "cyclorama" often used by cameramen at Keystone Studios' facilities in Edendale, California. There are sequences in the short showing Luke in close-up and running at breakneck speed through the countryside. The dog in reality was running on a treadmill positioned between a stationary camera and the cyclorama's rotating platform with background scenery hand-painted on a huge central cylinder or hub. The cyclorama, which can be seen in operation at Keystone in a surviving period film clip, creates an effective but somewhat cartoonish simulation of Luke dashing across the landscape. (Note: To achieve the close-up visual effects of Luke racing across the landscape and Fatty passing him, Fatty's bicycle was fastened to a wooden sled and pulled across the cyclorama's platform by stagehands using a rope. Later, in the 1917 short The Butcher Boy, Luke can be seen running on another treadmill. To see Luke performing that action, refer to the video on Wikipedia's page devoted to The Butcher Boy, beginning at time stamp 03:55 of that footage.)

In some film references, including the Internet Movie Database (IMDb), Fatty's Tintype Tangle is listed among the 1915 Keystone shorts in which Luke performs or at least appears. However, full surviving copies of that film available for viewing via the Internet Archive, as well as at some other online sources, do not show the dog in any scenes, either as part of the story or even visible in background shots.

=== 1916–1920 ===
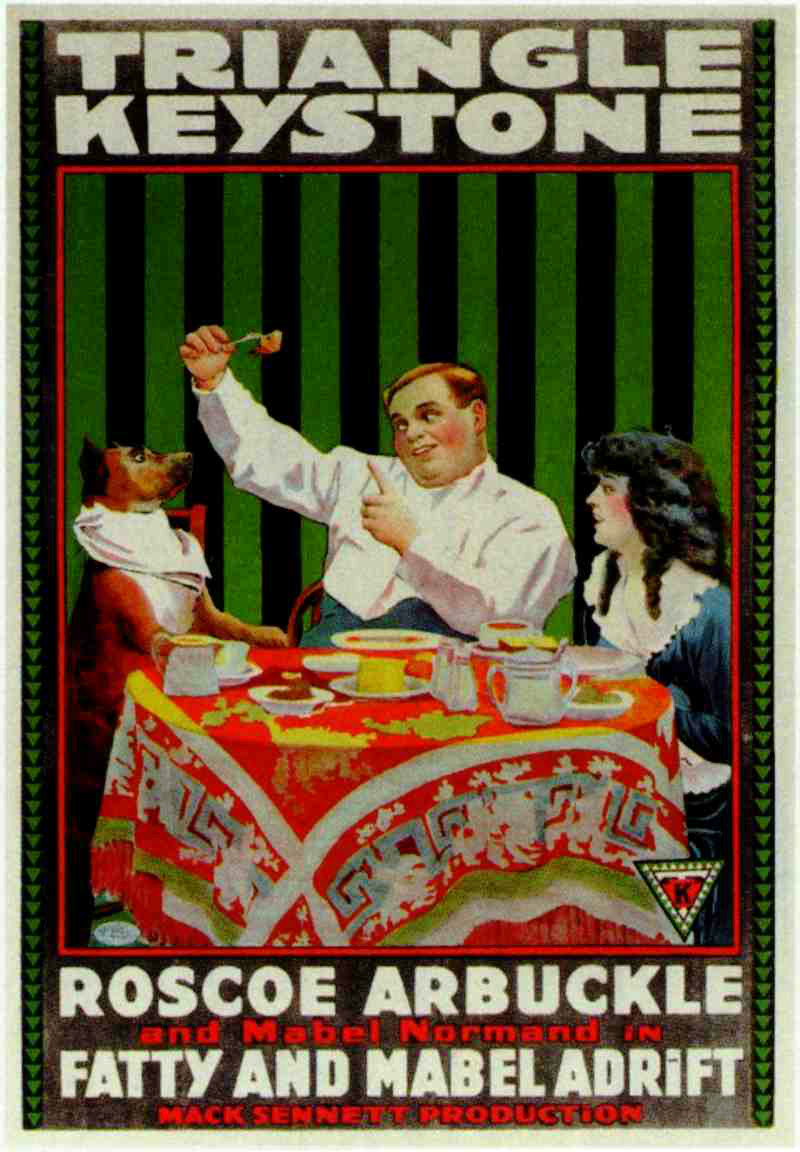
Luke was so popular by 1916 that he was included in promotions for the short Fatty and Mabel Adrift.

By 1916, Luke began to demonstrate that his athletic abilities were not limited to racing on the ground and vaulting through the air; he was equally proficient in water. Playing Arbuckle's faithful companion again in the two-reeler Fatty and Mabel Adrift, Luke—identified in the screen credits as "Teddy, The Keystone Dog"—chases Fatty's frequent nemesis Al St. John into the ocean, diving into the surf and pursuing the villain into deep water. Later in the film, Luke swims beachward to save Fatty and Mabel, whose honeymoon seaside cottage has been set adrift and is sinking.

Following his work on Fatty and Mabel Adrift, Arbuckle left Keystone to make films independently. Luke, of course, followed Roscoe and continued to appear in such films as The Butcher Boy (1917), The Cook (1918), and The Hayseed (1919). In its review of The Butcher Boy in April 1917, the entertainment trade paper Variety compliments the film and states, "The cast fits the star [Arbuckle], and not the least important member is 'Luke,' the bull terrier. It is a wonder." Luke's extended absence from the screen after The Butcher Boy was noticed by movie fans, who wanted to see more of him. In its September 1918 issue, the fan publication Motion Picture Magazine announces the return of the popular canine performer for the production of The Cook. "Luke", it reports, "the famous bull terrier, the pride of Fatty Arbuckle's heart, returned to his master recently, and will appear in Fatty's travesties for fifty bones a week."

Video segment from The Butcher Boy (1917) that shows footage of Luke

Luke's reliability and experience as a performer earned him a top salary during his career of $150 a week ($2,800 today). His final performances, both uncredited, were in two 1920 shorts: The Garage with Arbuckle and Fatty's comedic protégé Buster Keaton and The Scarecrow with only Keaton. In those releases, a stockier, more muscular Luke continues to display his skills as a man-chaser. Keaton's character in The Scarecrow runs in a panic from Luke, thinking the dog is rabid because he is foaming or "frothing" at the mouth. Actually, Luke had just eaten a cream pie and remnants of the cream remained around his snout. The "mad" dog relentlessly pursues Keaton over brick walls, up ladders again, around the top of a building, over planks, through windows, down a garbage chute, and through haystacks.

== Later years ==
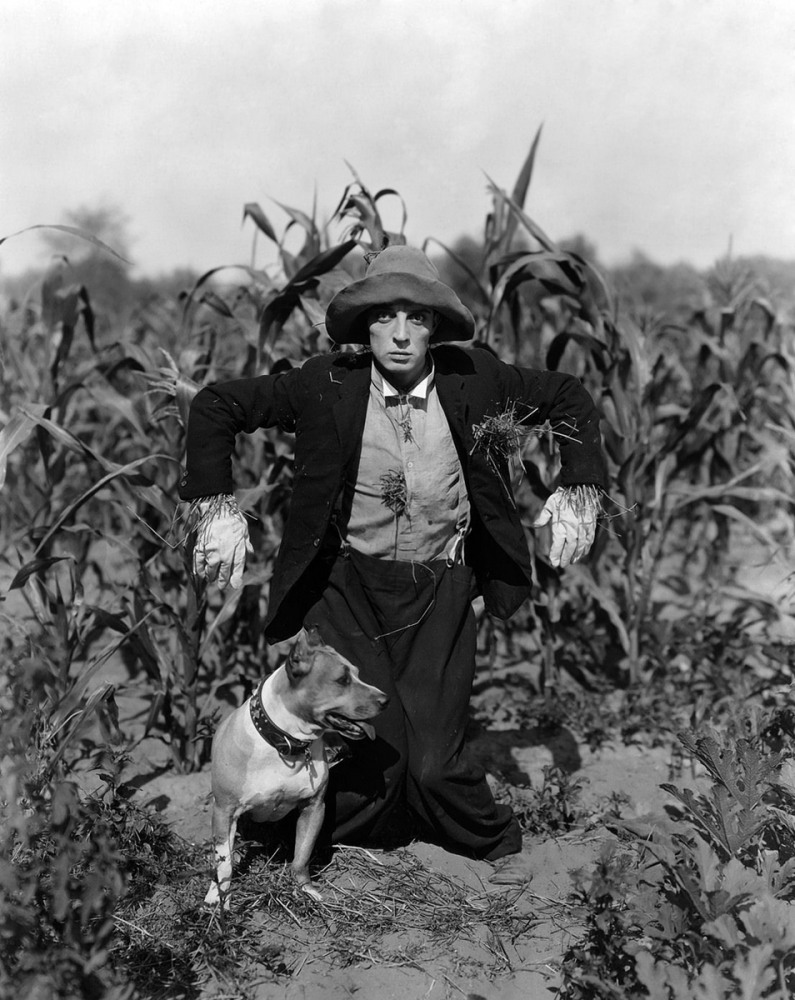
Luke with Keaton in The Scarecrow (1920), the dog's last film

Luke continued to spend most of his time with Roscoe until Arbuckle and Minta separated in 1921 and finally divorced in 1925. Minta gained custody of the dog as part of the couple's separation agreement and divorce settlement, although Roscoe did have visitation rights to see him. That arrangement may explain why the veteran stunt dog did not appear again on screen after his work with Keaton in The Scarecrow in 1920.

A tragic scandal that rocked Arbuckle's personal and professional life in 1921 may have also affected Luke's career and be another reason for the dog's apparent retirement from performing. The public closely identified Luke with Fatty, whose stardom ended as a result of the noted scandal. Arbuckle's films were effectively banned from many theaters for a while, and even some things associated with the former comedy star were shunned by moviegoers and the media as well. Whatever the reasons for Luke's absence from films after 1920, records suggest that he lived the remaining years of his life with Minta. Luke died in 1926 in Los Angeles at age 13, in keeping with the average life expectancy of his breed.

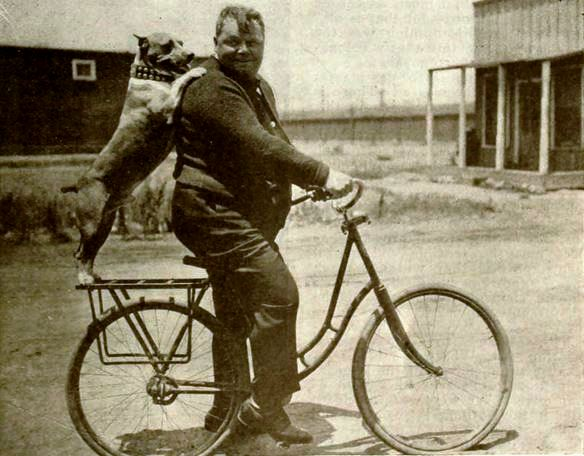
Arbuckle and Luke, Moving Picture World, January 1919

In July 1970—over four decades after Luke's death—Arbuckle biographer Stuart Oderman interviewed Grace Wiley, who was a former vaudevillian and an employee of Keystone while the dog with the "soft brown coat and white front" worked there. Wiley in that interview recalled Mack Sennett's comments about Luke's talents and reliability in film productions. She also observed that the studio head's regard for the talented animal was so high that he often had the terrier chauffeured to various locations in some of the finest automobiles owned by his company:

Mr. Sennett used to call that dog his most dependable performer. He never had to be told more than once what the scene required. That dog could jump off the high diving board, chase after Al St. John [Roscoe's nephew] from flat roof to flat roof. Mr. Sennett used to have that dog driven to the studio in Stevens-Duryeas, McFarlans or Alcos ... And Luke never asked for a raise, which made him happy.

== Filmography ==
- The Knockout (1914)
- Lover's Luck (1914)
- Mabel and Fatty's Wash Day (1915)
- Fatty's New Role (1915)
- Fatty's Faithful Fido (1915)
- Fatty's Plucky Pup (1915)
- Fatty and Mabel Adrift (1916)
- The Butcher Boy (1917)
- Coney Island (1917)
- The Cook (1918)
- The Sheriff (1918)
- The Hayseed (1919)
- The Garage (1920)
- The Scarecrow (1920)

== See also ==
- List of individual dogs
- Teddy the Great Dane
- Thunder the Dog
