= The Butcher Boy (1917 film) =

1917 film by Roscoe Arbuckle

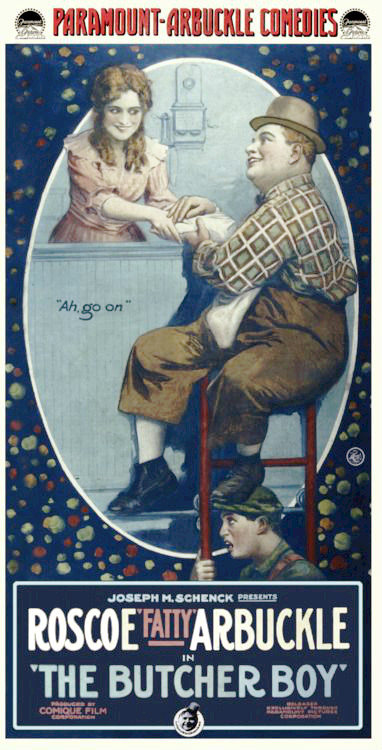
- Poster
- Directed by: Roscoe Arbuckle
- Written by: Roscoe ArbuckleJoseph Anthony Roach
- Produced by: Joseph M. Schenck
- Starring: Roscoe Arbuckle; Buster Keaton; Al St. John; Josephine Stevens; Arthur Earle; Joe Bordeaux; Luke the Dog; Charles Dudley; Alice Lake; Agnes Neilson
- Cinematography: Frank D. Williams
- Edited by: Herbert Warren
- Production company: Famous Players–Lasky Corporation
- Distributed by: Paramount Pictures
- Release date: April 23, 1917
- Running time: 30 minutes
- Country: United States
- Language: Silent (English intertitles)

The Butcher Boy is a 1917 American two-reel silent comedy film written by, directed by, and starring Roscoe "Fatty" Arbuckle and featuring Al St. John, Buster Keaton and Alice Lake. This was the first in Arbuckle's series of films with the Comique Film Corporation, and Keaton's film debut.

== Plot ==
The full short

Fatty, a butcher boy in a country store, is in love with Almondine, the daughter of the store's general manager Mr. Grouch. Fatty's attempts to get close to her are sidetracked when the store's clerk Alum, a rival for Alice's affections, starts a fight with the rotund butcher. Their confrontation in the store soon involves a customer as well as Grouch. The resulting mayhem includes small bags of flour being hurled and "exploding", pies being tossed, and brooms being wildly swung amid the thick clouds of flour lingering in the air.

Determined to marry Almondine, Fatty disguises himself as a female cousin and follows her to an all-girls boarding school. Unfortunately, Alum has the same idea and masquerades, too, as a female student. After another fight breaks out between Fatty and Alum, Fatty is taken by the school's principal Miss Teachem to a separate room to be punished. Meanwhile, Alum and his accomplices attempt to kidnap Almondine. Luckily, Fatty's dog Luke distracts the gang while Fatty and Almondine escape. Once outside, the couple see a sign on a tree identifying a nearby parsonage, so they run off arm-in-arm to get married there.

Note that the subtitles in a later release of The Butcher Boy cite new names for the characters: Alum is "Slim Snavely" and Almondine is "Amanda".

== Cast ==
- Roscoe "Fatty" Arbuckle as Fatty / Saccharine (credited as "Fatty" Arbuckle)
- Buster Keaton as Buster
- Al St. John as Alum
- Alice Lake as Almondine
- Arthur Earle as The Store Manager
- Joe Bordeaux as Accomplice (credited as Joe Bordeau)
- Luke as The Dog
- Charles Dudley (uncredited)
- Josephine Stevens (uncredited)
- Agnes Neilson as Miss Teachem (uncredited)

== Critical response ==
A review of The Butcher Boy was published in the April 20, 1917, issue of Variety, a trade magazine for the entertainment industry:

The Comique Film Co.'s series of Arbuckle two-reelers starts off with Fatty shaking out a bag of laugh making tricks. The cast fits the star, and not the least important member is "Luke," the bull terrier. It is a wonder. Arbuckle's juggling with the accessories of the country store where he is an important factor, also his way of handling the feminine clothes worn in his visit to the girl's boarding school, is done in such a serious, earnest way the comic effect is all the more forceful. The butcher boy in a country store falls in love with the cashier, the daughter of the proprietor, and when she is sent away to a boarding school, he goes to the school as her cousin. The first of the Arbuckle series has set a good mark to aim at. While there is some slapstick, the comedy is recommended.

The Moving Picture World offered similar praise: "If one laugh weighed an ounce, 'The Butcher Boy,' the first two-reel comedy made for Paramount by Roscoe Arbuckle, would weigh as much as 'Fatty' himself. Crammed full of laughs and chuckles, the offering justifies the wide pre-showing bookings of the Arbuckle comedies. Surrounded by a group of expert funmakers, 'Fatty' comes up to even the most optimistic expectations... 'Buster' Keaton does some excellent comedy falls."

== Censorship ==
Before The Butcher Boy could be released in Kansas, the Kansas Board of Review required the removal of a scene where Fatty is being spanked on a bed by Miss Teachem, and the intertitle "You will sleep here."

== See also ==
- List of American films of 1917
- Fatty Arbuckle filmography
- Buster Keaton filmography
