= The Hayseed =

1919 film

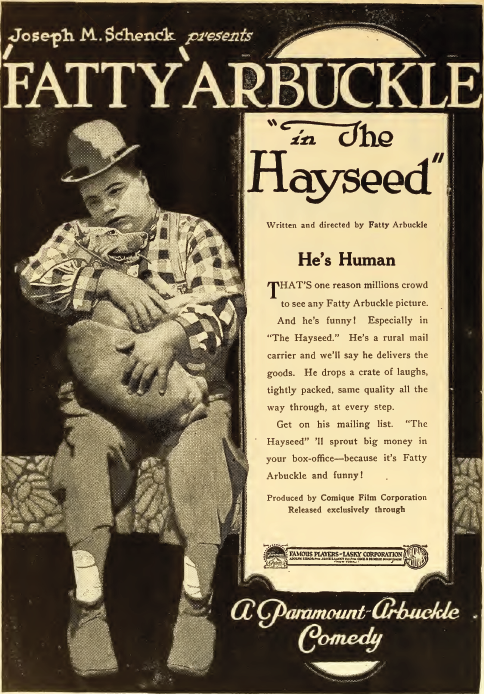
- Advertisement featuring Roscoe Arbuckle and Luke the dog
- Directed by: Roscoe Arbuckle
- Written by: Jean Havez
- Starring: Roscoe Arbuckle; Buster Keaton
- Cinematography: Elgin Lessley
- Distributed by: Paramount Pictures
- Release date: October 26, 1919
- Running time: 27 minutes
- Country: United States
- Language: Silent (English intertitles)

The Hayseed is a 1919 American two-reel silent comedy film directed by and starring Roscoe "Fatty" Arbuckle and featuring Buster Keaton.

== Plot ==
The Hayseed (1919)

Buster is the manager of a post office and general store in a provincial town where Fatty works as the mailman. While delivering his letters for the day, Fatty stops to see his girlfriend Fanny on her farm. There they play a game of hide-and-seek. While Fanny searches for Fatty he falls asleep; meanwhile, the town's constable arrives at the house and begins flirting with her.

Later in the day Fatty is busy sending out deliveries to the townsfolk when the constable sneaks into the building and steals a letter hidden by Fatty after hearing it is insured for $300. The constable presents Fanny with a ring bought with the money gained from Fatty's insured letter but is outraged when Fatty presents her with an even more expensive one. That night at the store, which has been converted into a dance hall, Fatty and Fanny dance while Buster entertains the crowd with magic tricks. Fatty is due to sing to the crowd; however, his voice gives out, so Buster persuades him to eat some onions to strengthen his voice. The onions have the desired effect, but they also make his breath so pungent that it causes the entire audience to cry.

Next the constable tries to frame Fatty by insinuating it was he who stole the money from the insured letter. As Fatty tries to deny the charges to his friends, they all (including his dog) turn their backs on him in disgust. Fatty believes their reaction is due to their not believing him, but it is actually due to his repugnant onion breath. Keaton then informs them that it was the constable, not Fatty, who stole the money. As a scuffle ensues, Fatty sics Luke on the crooked official, and the constable runs out of town with the dog in hot pursuit. In the film's closing scene, Fatty and Fanny prepare to celebrate their relationship with a kiss, but she initially refuses to kiss him due to his lingering bad breath. He suggests that she eat some onions too in order to cancel out the effect.

== Cast ==
- Roscoe "Fatty" Arbuckle as Mailman
- Buster Keaton as Manager, general store
- Molly Malone as Fanny, Rural girl
- John Henry Coogan Jr. as Constable (credited as John Coogan)
- Luke the Dog

== See also ==
- Roscoe Arbuckle filmography
- Buster Keaton filmography
