= The Garage (Singapore) =

Historic building in the Singapore Botanic Gardens

Coordinates: 1°19′8″N 103°48′56″E

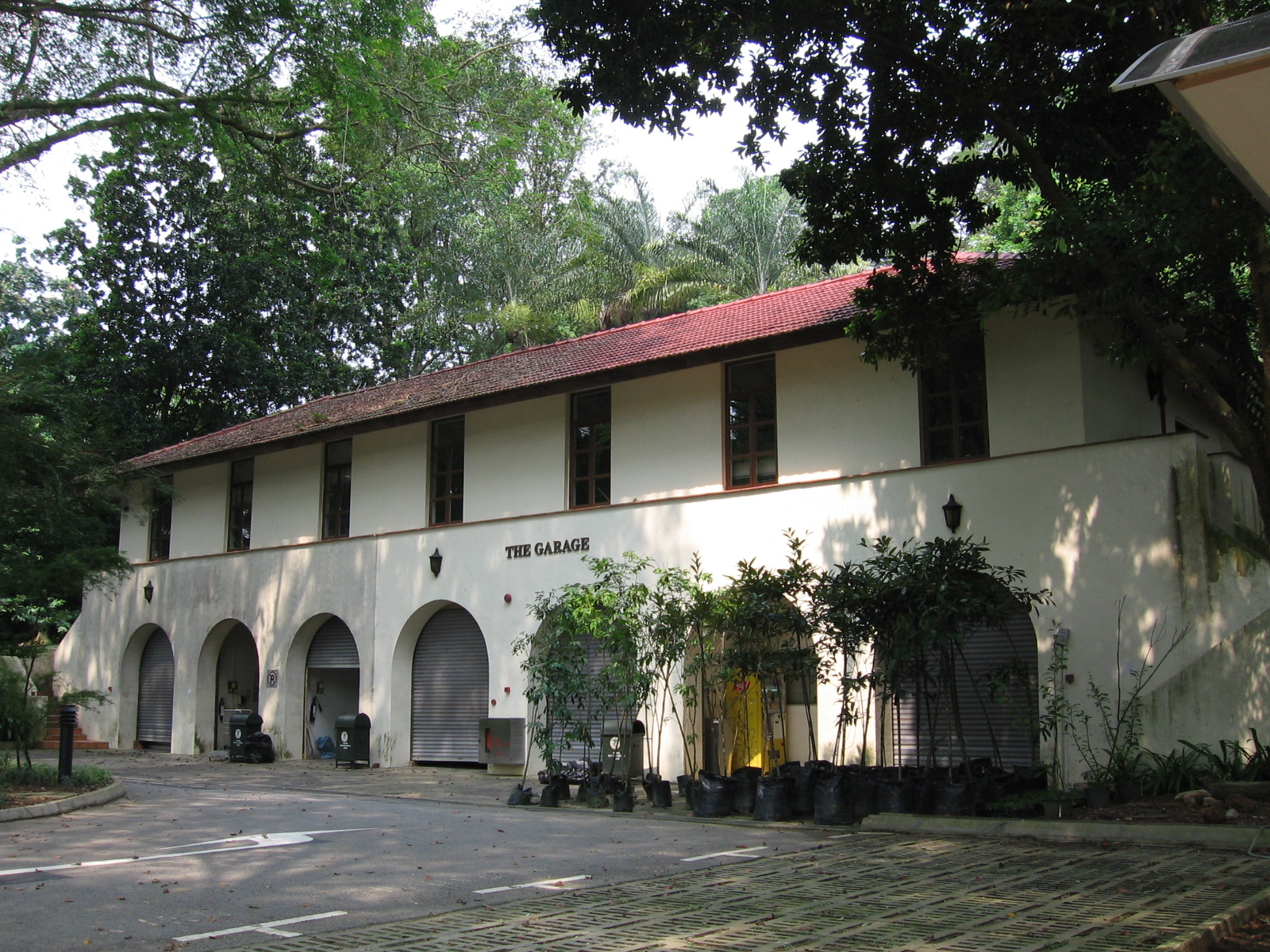
The building in 2006

The Garage is a historic building in the Singapore Botanic Gardens. Built in the 1920s, it currently houses the Bees Knees cafe and the Au Balcon restaurant.

== Description ==
The two-storey building was designed in the Art Deco style. It features a hip roof and a rendered finish, with seven individual garage spaces. The entrances to the garages on the ground floor feature half-round arches while staircases on either side of the building lead up to the first floor, which is set behind the front on the ground floor and made up of a single open space, featuring a truss roof of timber.

== History ==
Completed sometime between 1924 and 1928, the building initially stood on the University of Malaya's Bukit Timah Campus in Singapore. It served as a garage for the institution's professors. It also functioned as the National Parks Board's horticulture department in the 1990s. It was gazetted for conservation by the Urban Redevelopment Authority in June 2014.

In February 2017, lifestyle F&B company 1-Group opened Bees Knee's, a 60-seater bistro operating on the building's ground floor, and Botanico, modern European-style restaurant, which occupies the first floor of the building. Botanico was later replaced by Au Balcon, which is also owned by 1-Group.
