= Garage (video game) =

1999 video game

GARAGE: Bad Dream Adventure
- Box art for the original 1999 release.
- Developer: Kinotrope (Note: Android, iOS and Steam versions developed by Sakuba Metal Works and SmokymonkeyS.)
- Publishers: Toshiba-EMI; Sakuba Metal Works (Digital)
- Platforms: Microsoft Windows; Mac OS; Android iOS; Nintendo Switch
- Release: Mac OS: JP: March 25, 1999; Microsoft Windows: JP: March 25, 1999; WW: July 7, 2022 (Steam); Android, iOS: WW: December 10, 2021; Nintendo Switch: WW: June 6, 2024
- Genres: Adventure; Horror

Garage (full title: GARAGE: Bad Dream Adventure; Japanese: ガラージュ) is a Japanese surrealist point and click adventure game developed by Kinotrope and published by Toshiba-EMI for Windows and Macintosh in 1999.

== Plot and gameplay ==
Garage is a surreal and nightmarish point and click adventure inspired by the works of Carl Jung, set inside the mind of a man named Yang. Yang finds himself inside a therapy machine known as Garage, which creates within the user's mind a dystopian world similar to Kowloon Walled City. The city is inhabited by biomechanical entities trapped on a web of tracks, repeating their days in a dark society. The player takes control of a small bio-machine tasked with finding its "shadow" – a mysterious entity which seems to reflect another facet of the player character – and to escape the city in the process. Along the way, the player must meet other machines, solve puzzles, fish for frogs, and balance their ever-dwindling supplies of Ego and Fuel. The game's graphics are pre-rendered and digitized.

== Development ==
The game was written and designed by Japanese surrealist artist Tomomi Sakuba. It was also art-directed by Sakuba, produced by Masahiro Ikuta, co-produced by Akihiko Kawa, and programmed by Akiya Hayashi. Its 3D graphics were created by Gengo Ito and Hiroki Watanabe, with music composed by Tomonori Tanaka.

Sakuba began his interest in games with the Cyan, Inc. title Cosmic Osmo, which he had played around 1990. After learning that the game had been created in HyperCard, a software that was pre-installed for free on Mac computers at the time, he went to the library and began studying the software. He made a few experimental projects including Hobbit's Great Adventure and Talking before setting his sights on developing a full-fledged game.

When sketching out the design of the hero, Sakuba settled on a creature with an organic head on the body of a machine. He eventually decided to apply this design to all the characters. At least one poster was designed before the final poster was chosen for marketing. The official website for the game was published in August 1995, where the director maintained a diary of the game's progress.

== Release ==
The first release of this game was limited to 3,000 copies. The game's publisher, Toshiba-EMI, withdrew from CD-ROM publishing before further copies could be produced. Even in Japan, where the game was released, original copies of Garage are considered extremely rare, with only a few thousand in existence. When a used copy of the game appeared on the trading site Suruga-ya, it initially had an asking price of 300,000 yen.

Its first availability on the internet can be attributed to members of 4chan's retro gaming board, /vr/, who discovered it on an auction site, and pooled funds together in order to acquire and preserve it. The game's creator initially held resistance to republishing it, citing issues of "game balance", as well as his lack of rights to the property. A limited re-release, titled "Garage Private Edition", went on sale in mid-2007, and quickly sold out. With permission of Tomomi Sakuba, the game was a repackaging of the original release.

On March 31, 2020, LoneDev reverse engineered the game and implemented a patch to translate the videogame into English and permit game play on non-Japanese Windows 10 systems. The GarageDoor patch was announced on Discord and released on GitHub, greatly increasing interest in the video game in Western countries.

On December 10, 2021, an official remastered version of Garage, titled Garage: Complete Version, was released on iOS and Android devices, the first time the game would be officially playable in English – featuring UI and game balance improvements, new chapters, sidequests and multiple different endings. This version was later ported to Microsoft Windows, releasing on Steam as Garage: Bad Dream Adventure on July 7, 2022, and also Nintendo Switch under the same name on June 6, 2024.

== Reception ==
Hardcore Gaming 101 deemed Garage a "profoundly uncomfortable game to look at", due to its unsettling nature.
