= The Garage at Northwestern University =

Facility at Northwestern University

- Industry: Education
- Founded: 2015
- Headquarters: Evanston, Illinois, U.S.
- Key people: Melissa Kaufman (Executive Director), Mike Raab (Associate Director)
- Website: https://thegarage.northwestern.edu/

The Garage at Northwestern University is an interdisciplinary innovation and entrepreneurship space and community for students at Northwestern University. The Garage provides students with resources and programming related to entrepreneurship and mentorship. The Garage houses approximately 90 student-founded startups per academic quarter. Its programs and resources are available to all Northwestern students. As of August 2026, The Garage was ranked the #1 University Incubator in the country by TIME and Statista on their inaugural America's Best Incubators and Accelerators ranking.

== Administration ==
Mike Raab is the current Executive Director of The Garage. Raab is also the co-author of the award winning and Amazon Best Selling book, Founded: The No B.S. Guide for Student Entrepreneurs, along with the founding executive director of The Garage, Melissa Kaufman.

== Facilities ==
The Garage is headquartered at 2311 Campus Drive, Suite 2300 on the campus of Northwestern University in Evanston Illinois. Designed by architecture firm Gensler, The Garage is an 11,000-square-foot space within an existing parking garage and includes a co-working space, meeting spaces, and a classroom space. Other amenities include a prototyping lab, augmented reality/virtual reality lab, 3-D printers, design software, and a cafe.

== Programs and events ==
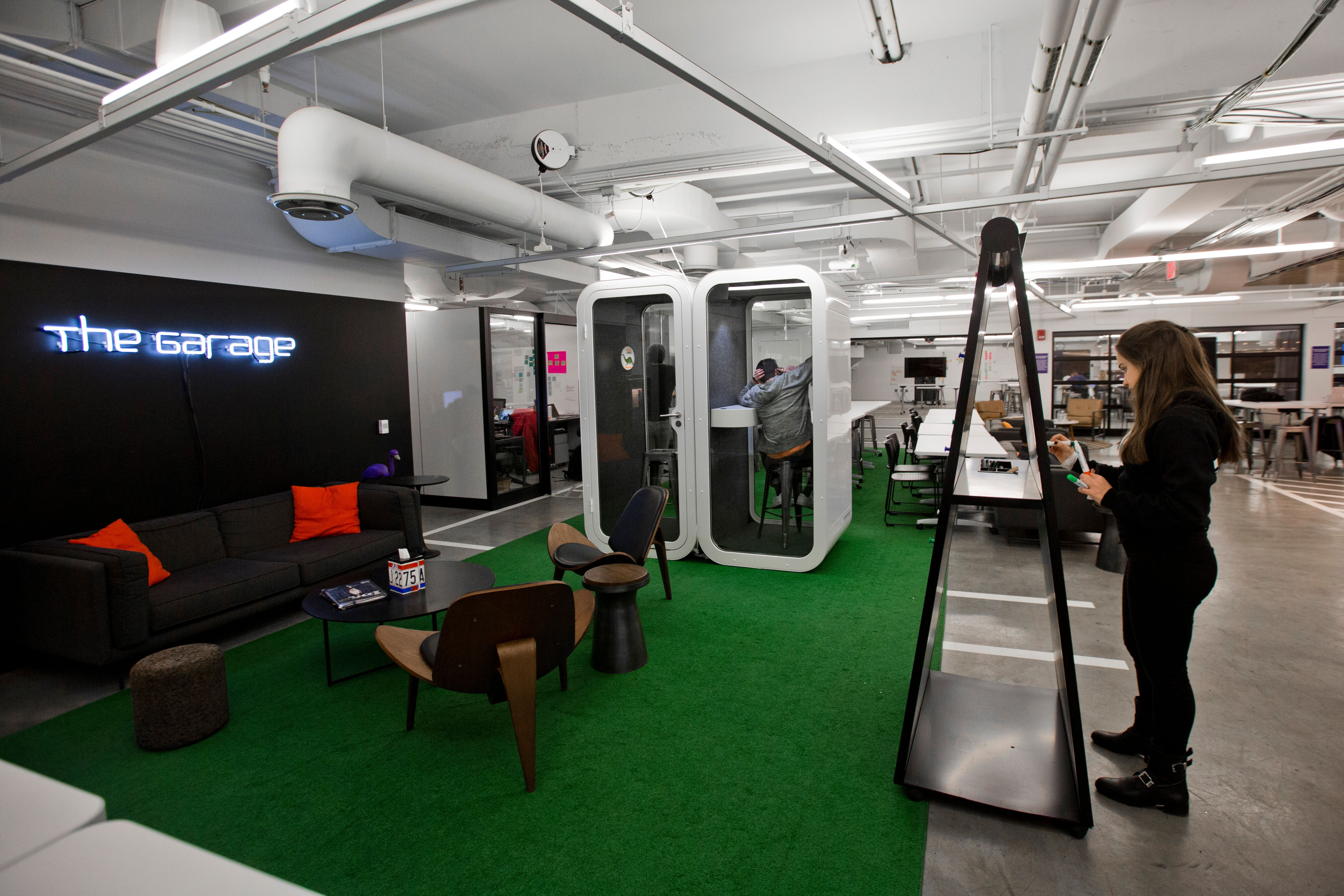
Students at work inside The Garage at Northwestern University

The Garage coordinates programs and events open to all Northwestern students to work on innovation projects and startups outside of their standard coursework.

=== Residency Program ===
The Garage’s Residency Program is an incubation program for early-stage startups. Resident teams are selected on a quarterly basis using an application, and receive mentoring, classes, workshops, and events. As of 2019, The Garage has incubated more than 300 student-founded startups.

=== Propel Program ===
The Propel Program provides mentorship and stipends to women students interested in entrepreneurship and innovation. Each student in the six-month program receives up to $1,000 to use as seed money to experiment with their ideas. The program is a gift from Steve Elms, an alumnus of the Kellogg School of Management, and his wife Katherine Thomas Elms.

=== Jumpstart ===
Jumpstart is a full time pre-accelerator program for Northwestern students looking to launch a venture. The program lasts 10 weeks and offers student startups workspace, mentorship, entrepreneurship curriculum, and a $10,000 stipend. All teams are assigned a “Growth Mentor” to guide the startup throughout the duration of the program.

=== VentureCat ===
VentureCat is Northwestern's annual startup pitch competition in which students compete for a total of $100,000 in prize money. In the 2018 VentureCat competition, BrewBike won a $20,000 investment.

=== NUSeeds ===
NUseeds is Northwestern’s $4M pre-seed/seed investment fund. The funding comes from philanthropic donations to Northwestern, and is intended to accelerate the successful launch of innovations from Northwestern students and finance the most promising early-stage student ventures. NUseeds provides funding in the $10,000 – $100,000 range in exchange for equity.

== Alumni ==
Alumni of The Garage have gone on to work on their ventures as full time founders and CEOs. Other alumni have taken corporate jobs at tech companies including Google, Spotify, and Apple.
