= The Garage (1920 film) =

1920 film by Roscoe Arbuckle

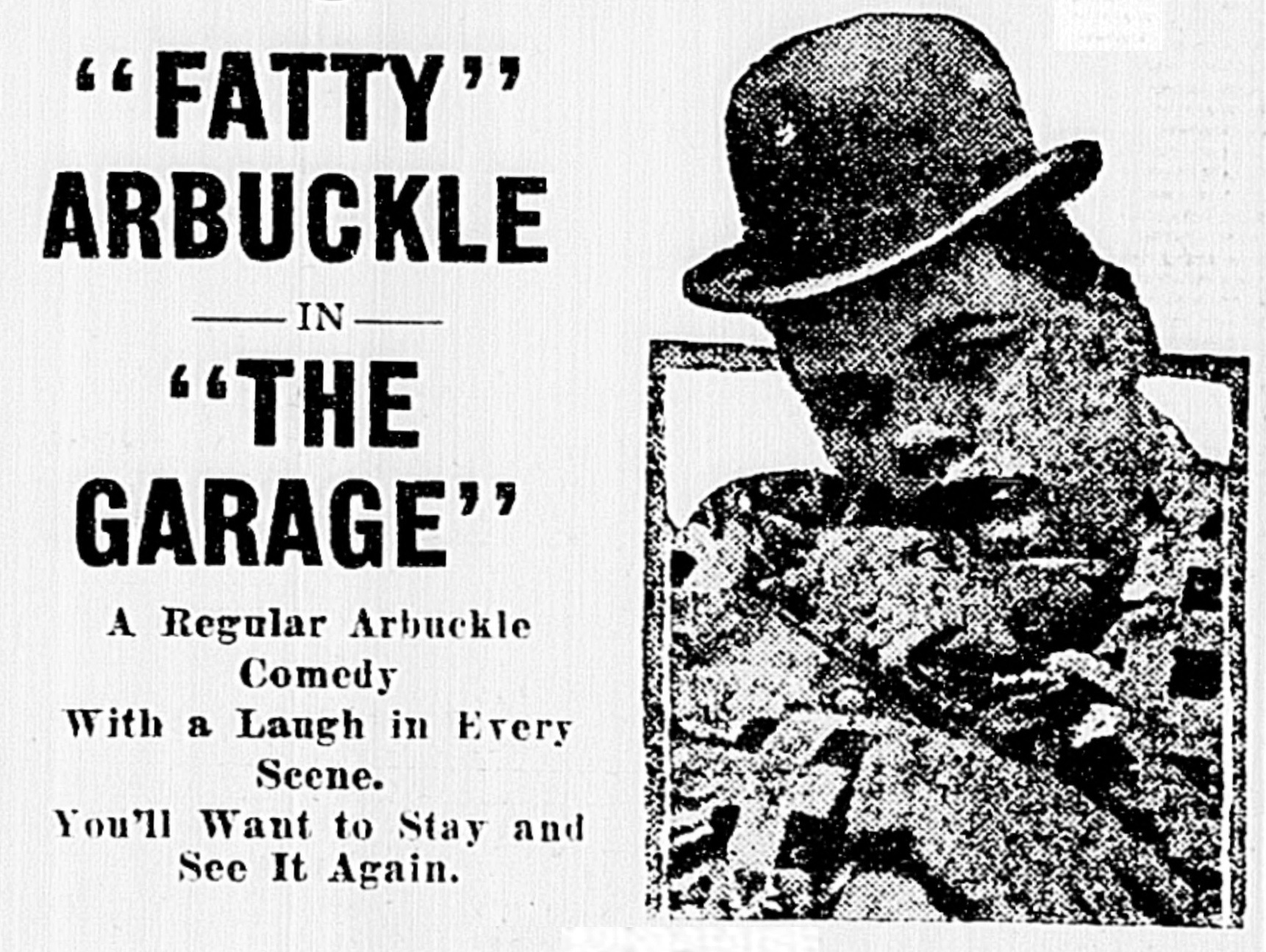
- Newspaper advertisement
- Directed by: Roscoe Arbuckle
- Written by: Jean Havez
- Starring: Roscoe Arbuckle; Buster Keaton
- Cinematography: Elgin Lessley
- Production company: Comique Film Company
- Distributed by: Paramount Pictures
- Release date: January 11, 1920
- Running time: 25 minutes
- Country: United States
- Language: Silent (English intertitles)

The Garage is a 1920 American two-reel silent comedy film directed by and starring Roscoe "Fatty" Arbuckle and featuring Buster Keaton. This was the fourteenth and last film starring the duo before Keaton set up his own studio and Arbuckle started making feature-length films. The film also stars Luke the Dog, who starred in many other short comedies with Arbuckle. The film was also known as Fire Chief.

== Plot ==
Full film

Fatty and Buster play automobile mechanics and firemen at a garage in a fire station. Molly Malone plays the boss' daughter who is constantly pestered by a stranger named Jim who wishes to make her his girlfriend, though she turns him down after the flowers he brings her end up accidentally soaked in motor oil thanks to Fatty and Buster. Livid, Jim raises the alarm in the fire station to make Fatty and Buster think there is a fire and forcing them to rush across town. However, Jim accidentally starts a real fire while trying to exit the station and Fatty and Buster immediately return to put out the fire and rescue Molly who is trapped inside. They attach the fire hose to a hydrant, but the hose has a leak, forcing Fatty to sit on it. After a streetcar runs over the hose, Fatty, Buster and several of the townspeople rescue Molly using a life net but she bounces up into the telephone wires. Fatty and Buster eventually get Molly down but become trapped themselves; luckily Molly moves a car beneath them just before they fall and all three ride off together.

== Cast ==
- Roscoe "Fatty" Arbuckle as Mechanic / Fireman
- Buster Keaton as Mechanic / Fireman
- Molly Malone as Garage Owner's Daughter
- Harry McCoy as Jim
- Dan Crimmins as Rube the Garage Owner (as Daniel Crimmins)
- Luke the Dog
- Alice Lake in undetermined role (uncredited) (unconfirmed)

== Product placement ==
A favorable review of this movie by the weekly trade publication Harrison's Reports was followed by the statement:

Exhibitors of Los Angeles might ask Mr. Arbuckle how much he received for advertising Red Crown gasoline, handled by almost every Oil Station in their city. The trade mark of that product appears in numerous scenes on the portable gasoline pump. If he states it was an oversight, it would be well to caution him to avoid such oversights in the future.

— Harrison's Reports, 17 January 1920, p. 9

Brand name product placement in movies may have occurred before the 1920s, but this is the earliest movie cited by Harrison's Reports for that practice. For the next four decades, Harrison's Reports frequently denounced product placement.

== See also ==
- List of American films of 1920
- List of firefighting films
