= The Garage (Winston-Salem) =

- Interactive map of The Garage
- Address: 110 West 7th Street
- Location: Winston-Salem, North Carolina
- Coordinates: 36.1028°N 80.2455°W
- Type: Music venue

Construction
- Opened: 1999

Website
- www.the-garage.ws (archived)

The Garage was a live music venue and bar in Winston-Salem, North Carolina, United States. It closed December 31, 2017. It was considered to be Winston's hallmark venue for local and touring acts. The Garage opened its doors unofficially in September 1999 and was owned and operated by Richard Emmett and Kimberly Lawson. The Garage was licensed and open in 2000. In May 2012, Emmett and Lawson sold the venue to its last owner, Tucker Tharpe. The Garage has been a host venue for Phuzz Phest, an annual music festival in downtown Winston-Salem, since 2012. The Garage has had two doormen Sam 'The Man' and Jon Hampton.
