= Roscoe Arbuckle =

American actor (1887–1933)

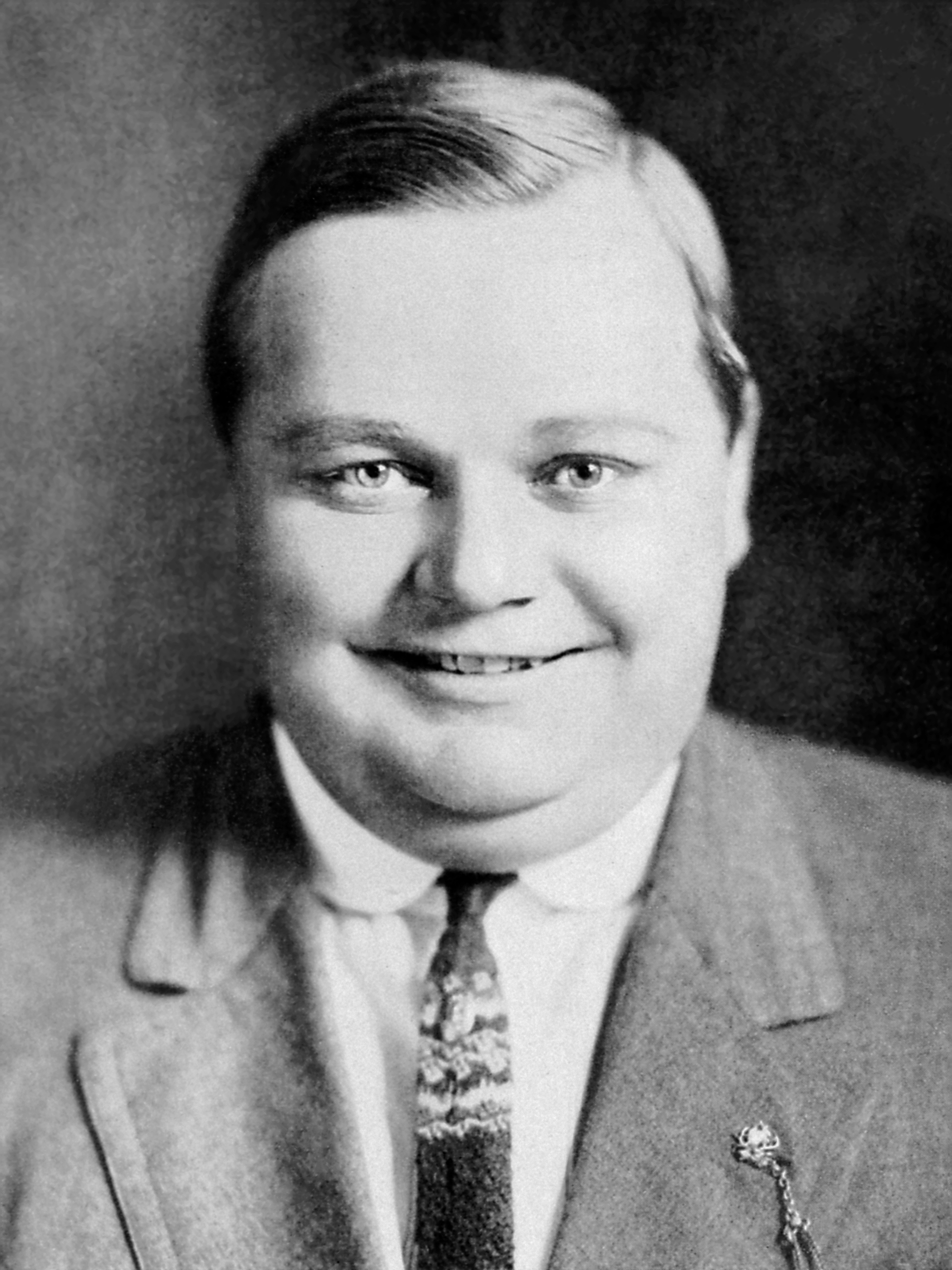
- Arbuckle c. 1916
- Born: Roscoe Conkling Arbuckle; March 24, 1887; Smith Center, Kansas, U.S.
- Died: June 29, 1933 (aged 46); New York City, U.S.
- Other names: Fatty Arbuckle, William Goodrich
- Occupations: Actor; director; screenwriter; comedian
- Years active: 1904–1933
- Spouses: Minta Durfee (m. 1908; div. 1925) Doris Deane (m. 1925; div. 1929) Addie McPhail (m. 1932)
- Relatives: Andrew Arbuckle (cousin); Maclyn Arbuckle (cousin); Al St. John (nephew)

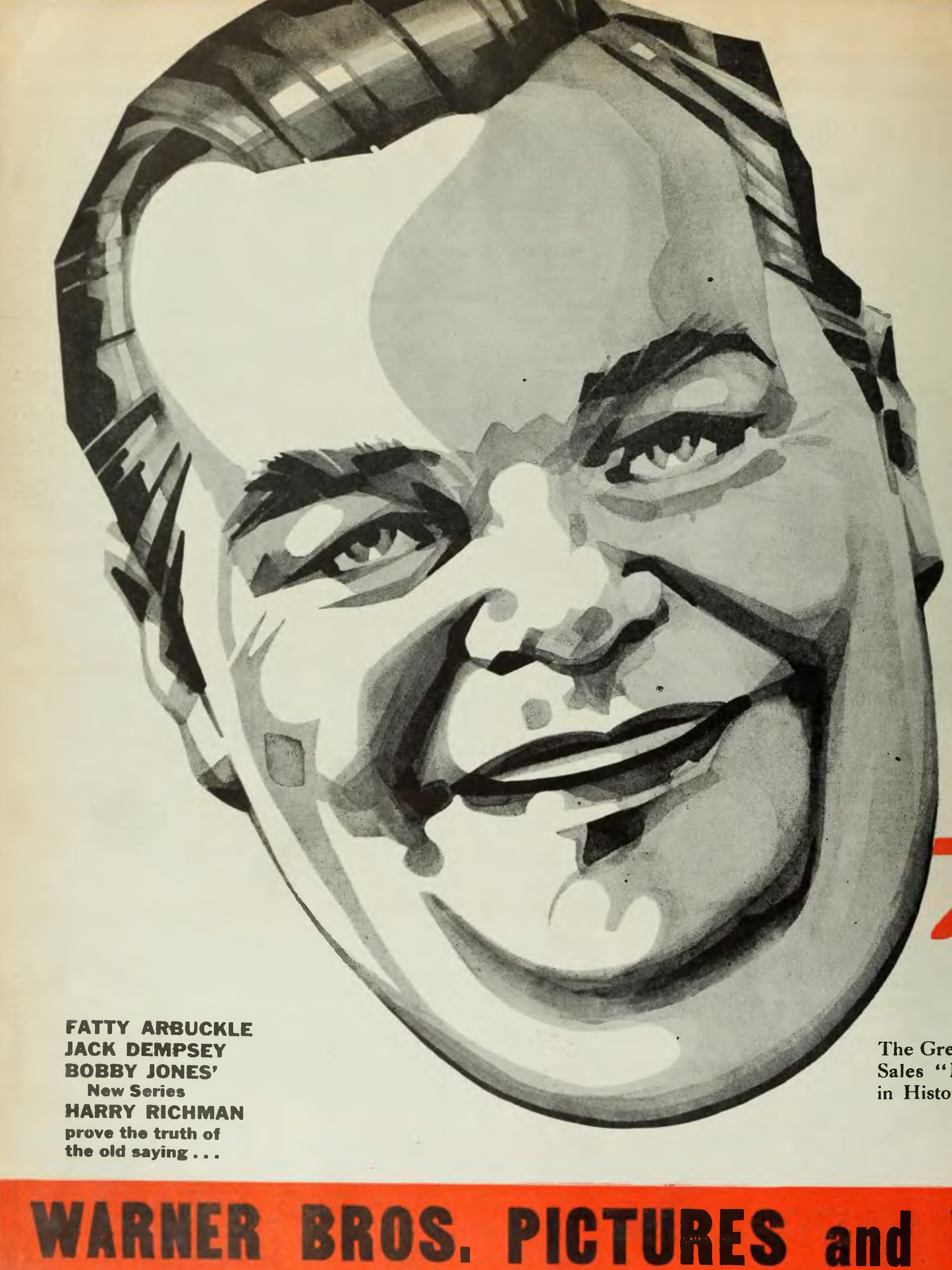
Fatty Arbuckle ad from The Film Daily, 1932

Roscoe Conkling Arbuckle (/ˈɑːrbʌkəl/; March 24, 1887 – June 29, 1933) was an American silent film actor, director, and screenwriter. He started at the Selig Polyscope Company and eventually moved to Keystone Studios, where he worked with Mabel Normand and Harold Lloyd as well as with his nephew, Al St. John. He also mentored Charlie Chaplin, Monty Banks, and Bob Hope and brought vaudeville star Buster Keaton into the movie business. Arbuckle was one of the most popular silent stars of the 1910s and one of the highest-paid actors in Hollywood, signing a contract in 1920 with Paramount Pictures for $1 million a year (equivalent to $16.1 million in 2025).

Arbuckle was the defendant in three widely publicized trials between November 1921 and April 1922 for the rape and manslaughter of Virginia Rappe. Rappe had fallen ill at a party hosted by Arbuckle at San Francisco's St. Francis Hotel in September 1921 and died four days later. A friend of Rappe accused Arbuckle of raping and accidentally killing her. The first two trials resulted in hung juries, but the third trial acquitted Arbuckle. The third jury took the unusual step of giving Arbuckle a written statement of apology for his treatment by the justice system.

Despite Arbuckle's acquittal, the scandal has mostly overshadowed his legacy as a pioneering comedian. At the behest of Adolph Zukor, president of Famous Players–Lasky, his films were banned by motion picture industry censor Will H. Hays after the trial, and he was publicly ostracized. Zukor was faced with the moral outrage of various groups such as the Lord's Day Alliance, the powerful Federation of Women's Clubs and even the Federal Trade Commission to curb what they perceived as Hollywood debauchery run amok and its effect on the morals of the general public. While Arbuckle saw a resurgence in his popularity immediately after his acquittal, Zukor decided he had to be sacrificed to keep the movie industry out of the clutches of censors and moralists. Hays lifted the ban within a year, but Arbuckle only worked sparingly through the 1920s. In their deal, Keaton promised to give him 35% of the Buster Keaton Comedies Co. profits. He later worked as a film director under the pseudonym William Goodrich. He was finally able to return to acting, making short two-reel comedies in 1932–33 for Warner Bros.

Arbuckle died in his sleep of a heart attack in 1933 at age 46, reportedly on the day that he signed a contract with Warner Bros. to make a feature film.

== Early life ==
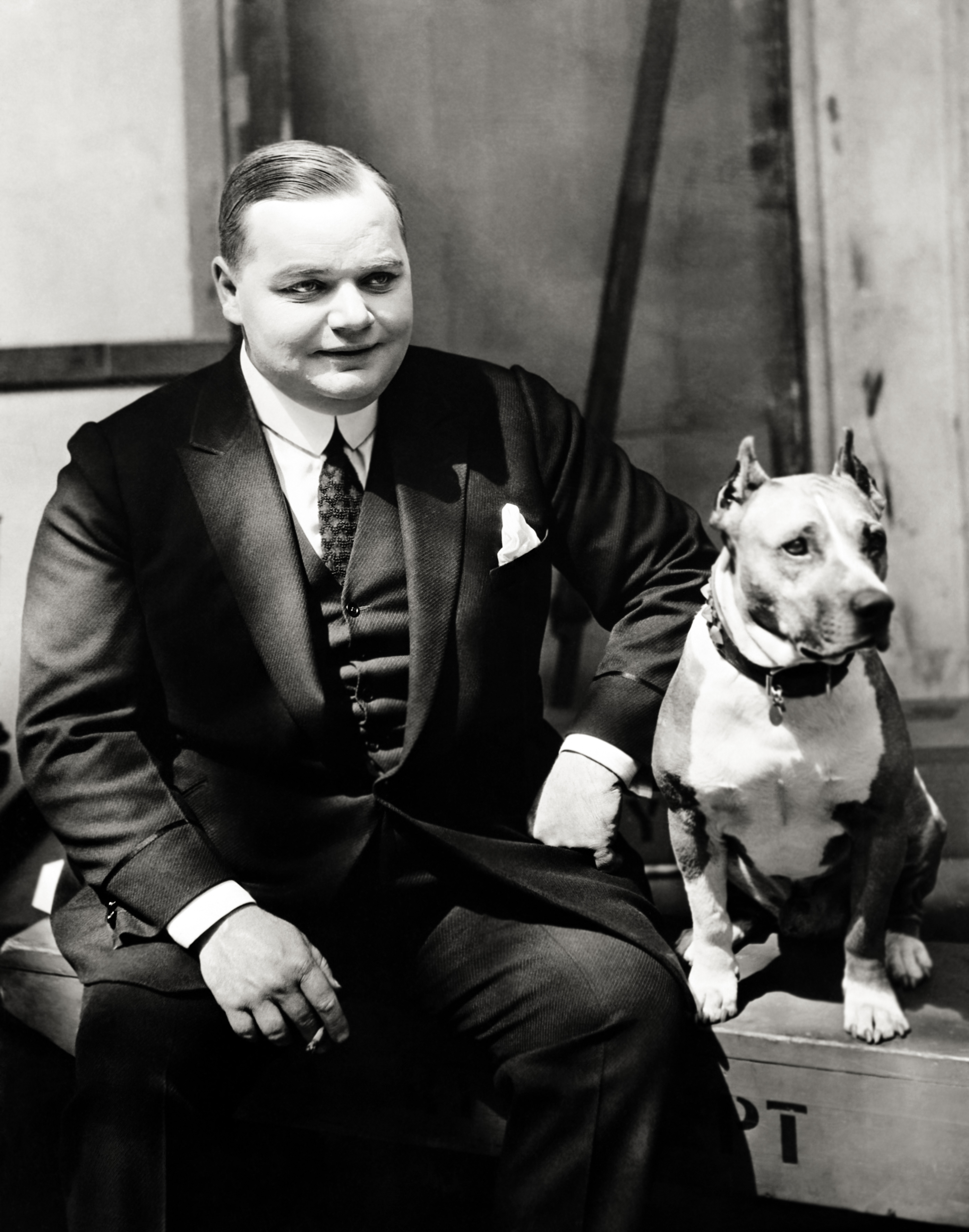
Arbuckle with his and Minta Durfee's dog Luke, c. 1919

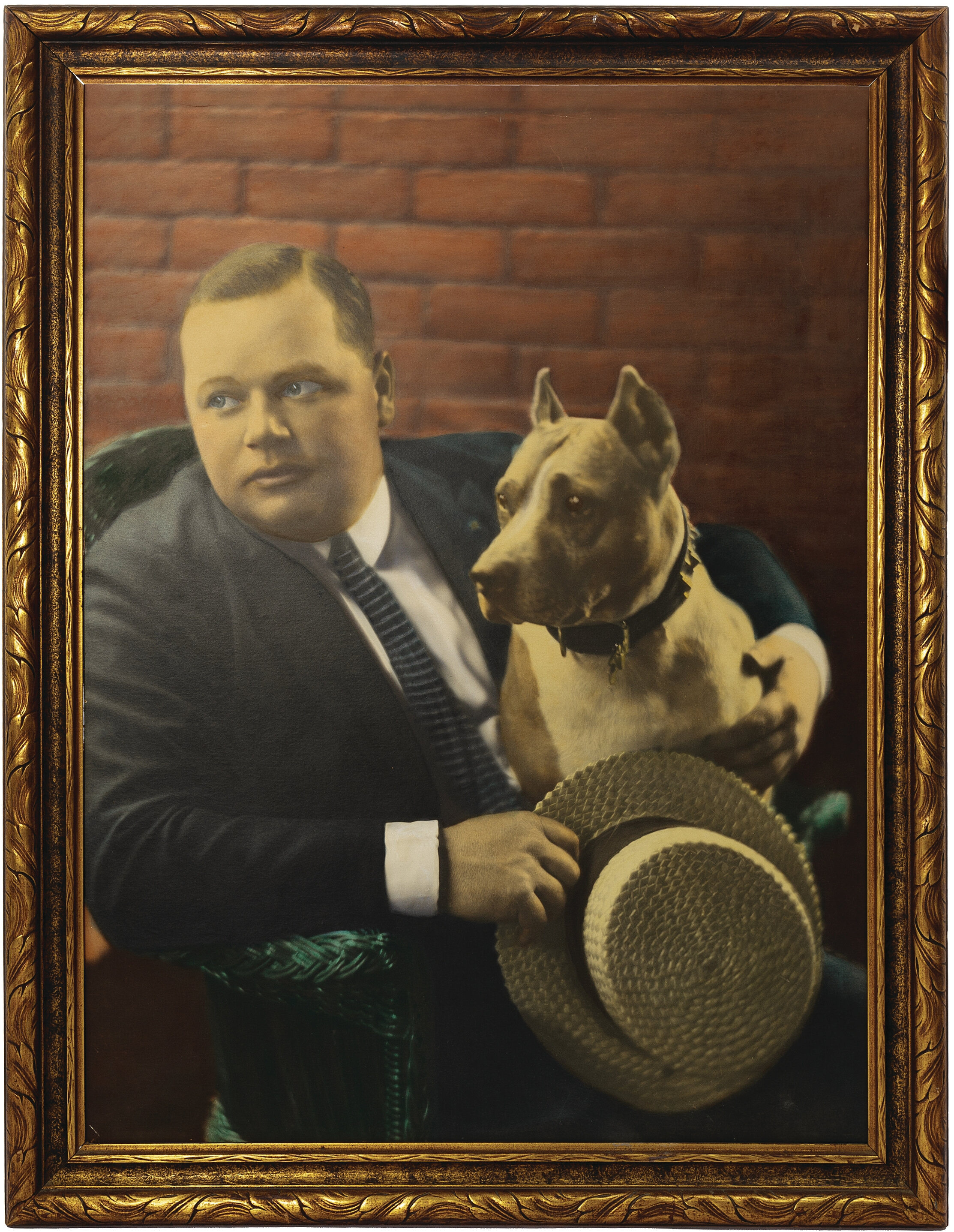
Hand-tinted photograph of Arbuckle, c. 1915

Roscoe Arbuckle was born on March 24, 1887, in Smith Center, Kansas, one of nine children of Mary E. Gordon and William Goodrich Arbuckle. He weighed in excess of 13 pounds (5.9 kg) at birth and his father believed that he was illegitimate, as both parents had slim builds. Consequently, he named him after Senator Roscoe Conkling of New York, a notorious philanderer whom he despised. The birth was traumatic for Mary and resulted in chronic health problems that contributed to her death eleven years later.

Arbuckle was nearly two when his family moved to Santa Ana, California. He first performed on stage with Frank Bacon's company at age 8 during their performance in Santa Ana. Arbuckle enjoyed performing and continued on until his mother's death in 1898, when he was 11. Arbuckle's father had always treated him harshly and now refused to support him, so he got work doing odd jobs in a hotel. He was in the habit of singing while he worked, and a professional singer heard him and invited him to perform in an amateur talent show. The show consisted of the audience judging acts by clapping or jeering, with bad acts pulled off the stage by a shepherd's crook. Arbuckle sang, danced, and did some clowning around, but he did not impress the audience. He saw the crook emerging from the wings and somersaulted into the orchestra pit in obvious panic. The audience went wild, and he won the competition and began a career in vaudeville.

== Career ==
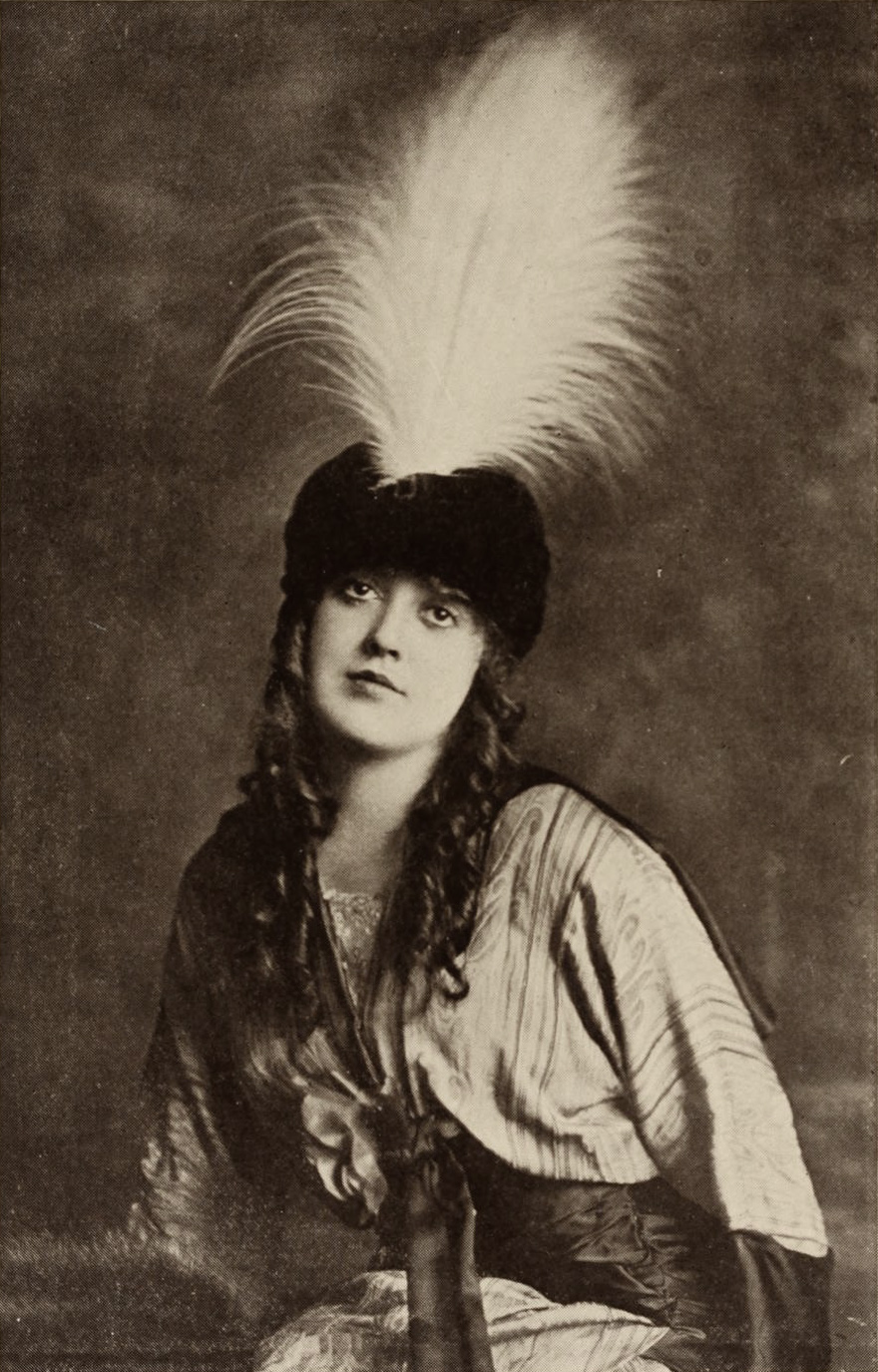
Frequent co-star Mabel Normand

In 1904, Sid Grauman invited Arbuckle to sing in his new Unique Theater in San Francisco, beginning a long friendship between the two. He then joined the Pantages Theatre Group touring the West Coast and in 1906 played the Orpheum Theater in Portland, Oregon, in a vaudeville troupe organized by Leon Errol. Arbuckle became the main act and the group took their show on tour.

On August 6, 1908, Arbuckle married Minta Durfee (1889–1975), the daughter of Charles Warren Durfee and Flora Adkins. Durfee starred in many early comedy films, often with Arbuckle. As a couple, they appeared mismatched, as Minta was short and petite while Arbuckle weighed approximately 300 lbs (136 kg). Arbuckle then joined the Morosco Burbank Stock vaudeville company and went on a tour of China and Japan, returning in early 1909.

Arbuckle began his film career with the Selig Polyscope Company in July 1909 when he appeared in Ben's Kid. He appeared sporadically in Selig one-reelers until 1913, moved briefly to Universal Pictures, and became a star in producer-director Mack Sennett's Keystone Cops comedies. (Note: However, according to the Motion Picture Studio Directory for 1919 and 1921, Arbuckle began his screen career with Keystone in 1913 as an extra for $3 a day (equivalent to approximately $98 in 2025 dollars), working his way up through the acting ranks to become a lead player and director).)

Arbuckle was a talented singer. After famed operatic tenor Enrico Caruso heard him sing, he urged the comedian to "give up this nonsense you do for a living, with training you could become the second greatest singer in the world."

== Screen comedian ==
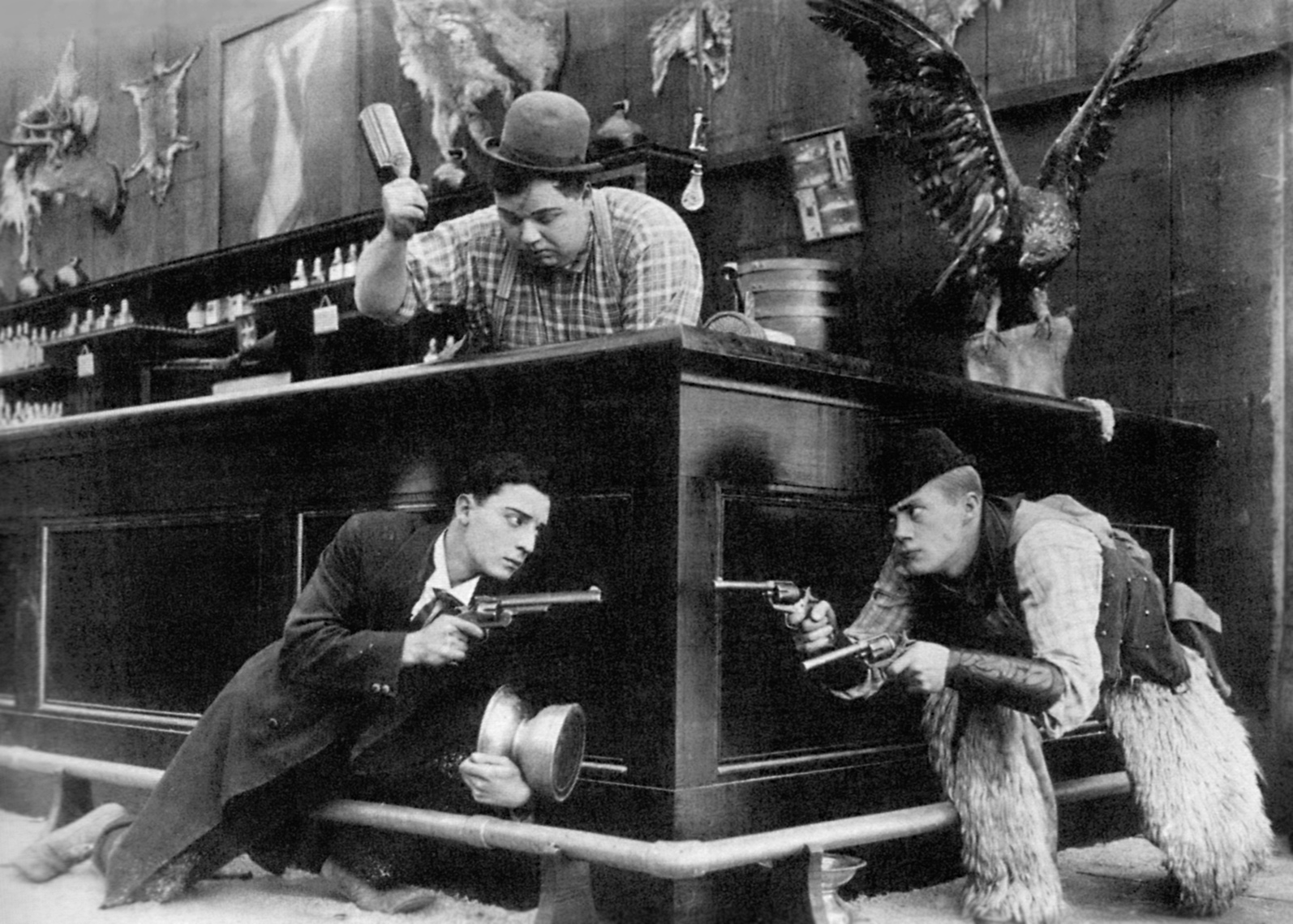
Arbuckle's nephew Al St. John (right) with Buster Keaton and Arbuckle in Out West (1918)

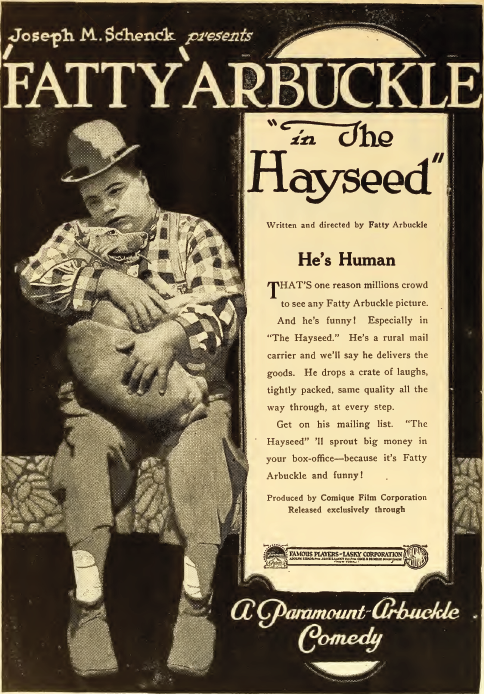
Ad for The Hayseed (1919) with Arbuckle holding his dog Luke

Despite his physical size, Arbuckle was remarkably agile and acrobatic. Mack Sennett, when recounting his first meeting with Arbuckle, noted that he "skipped up the stairs as lightly as Fred Astaire" and that he "without warning went into a feather light step, clapped his hands and did a backward somersault as graceful as a girl tumbler". His comedies are noted as rollicking and fast-paced, have many chase scenes, and feature sight gags. Arbuckle was fond of the "pie in the face", a comedy cliché that has come to symbolize silent-film-era comedy itself. The earliest known pie thrown in film was in the June 1913 Keystone one-reeler A Noise from the Deep, starring Arbuckle and frequent screen partner Mabel Normand.

In 1914, Paramount Pictures made the then unheard-of offer of US$1,000 a day plus twenty-five percent of all profits and complete artistic control to make movies with Arbuckle and Normand. The movies were so lucrative and popular that in 1918 they offered Arbuckle a three-year, $3 million contract (equivalent to $64 million in 2025).

By 1916, Arbuckle was experiencing serious health problems. An infection that developed on his leg became a carbuncle so severe that doctors considered amputation. Although Arbuckle was able to keep his leg, he was prescribed morphine against the pain; he would later be accused of being addicted to it. Following his recovery, Arbuckle started his own film company, Comique, in partnership with Joseph Schenck. Although Comique produced some of the best short pictures of the silent era, Arbuckle transferred his controlling interest in the company to Buster Keaton in 1918 and accepted Paramount's $3 million offer to make up to 18 feature films over three years.

Arbuckle disliked his screen nickname. "Fatty" had also been Arbuckle's nickname since school; "It was inevitable", he said. Fans also called Roscoe "The Prince of Whales" and "The Balloonatic". However, the name Fatty identifies the character that Arbuckle portrayed on-screen (usually a naive hayseed), not Arbuckle himself. When Arbuckle portrayed a female, the character was named "Miss Fatty", as in the film Miss Fatty's Seaside Lovers. Arbuckle discouraged anyone from addressing him as "Fatty" off-screen, and when they did so his usual response was, "I've got a name, you know."

== Scandal ==
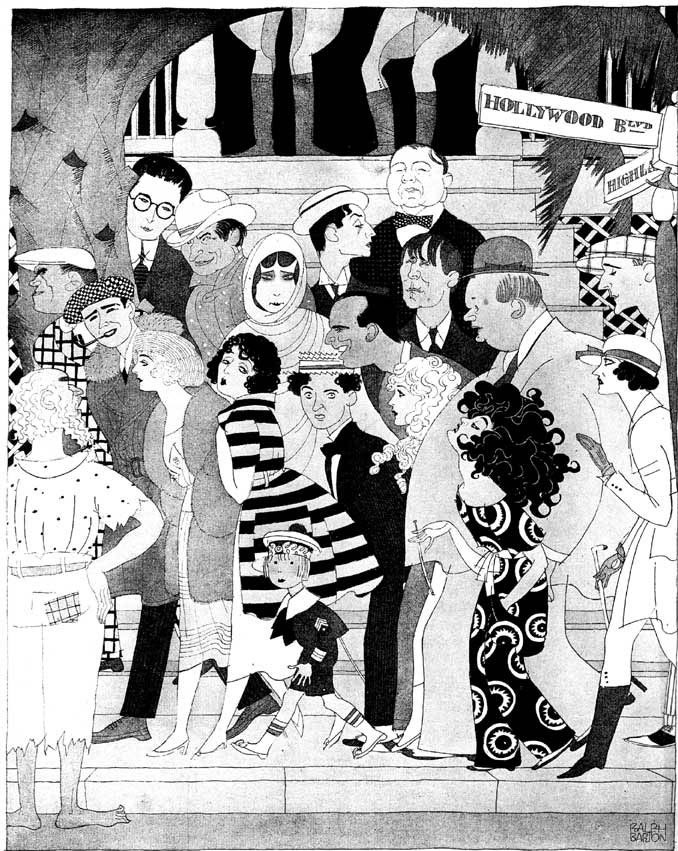
This 1922 Vanity Fair caricature by Ralph Barton shows the famous people who, he imagined, left work each day in Hollywood; use cursor to identify individual figures.

On Monday, September 5, 1921 (Labor Day), Arbuckle took a break from his hectic film schedule and, despite suffering second-degree burns to both buttocks from an on-set accident, drove to San Francisco with two friends, Lowell Sherman and Fred Fishback. The three checked into three rooms at the St. Francis Hotel: 1219 for Arbuckle and Fishback to share, 1221 for Sherman, and 1220 designated as a party room. Several women were invited to the suite. During the carousing, a 30-year-old aspiring actress named Virginia Rappe was found seriously ill in room 1219 and was examined by the hotel doctor, who concluded that her symptoms were mostly caused by intoxication and administered morphine to calm her. Rappe was not hospitalized until two days after the incident.

At the hospital, Rappe's companion at the party, Bambina Maude Delmont, told a doctor that Arbuckle had raped Rappe. The doctor examined Rappe but found no evidence of rape. She died Friday, September 9, 1921, from peritonitis caused by a ruptured bladder. Rappe suffered from chronic urinary tract infections, a condition that liquor can irritate dramatically.

The day after Rappe's death, Arbuckle was arrested and arraigned on charges of murder and held without bail. A grand jury also indicted him on manslaughter of the first degree on September 13, 1921.

Delmont told police that Arbuckle had raped Rappe. The police concluded that the impact of Arbuckle's overweight body on top of Rappe caused her bladder to rupture. At a press conference, Rappe's manager, Al Semnacher, accused Arbuckle of using a piece of ice to simulate sex with Rappe that led to her injuries. By the time that the story was reported in newspapers, the object had evolved into a Coca-Cola or champagne bottle rather than a piece of ice. In fact, witnesses testified that Arbuckle rubbed the ice on Rappe's stomach to ease her abdominal pain. Arbuckle denied any wrongdoing. Delmont later admitted to plotting to extort money from him.

Fatty's Chance Acquaintance (1915), with intertitles in Dutch. Runtime 00:14:39.

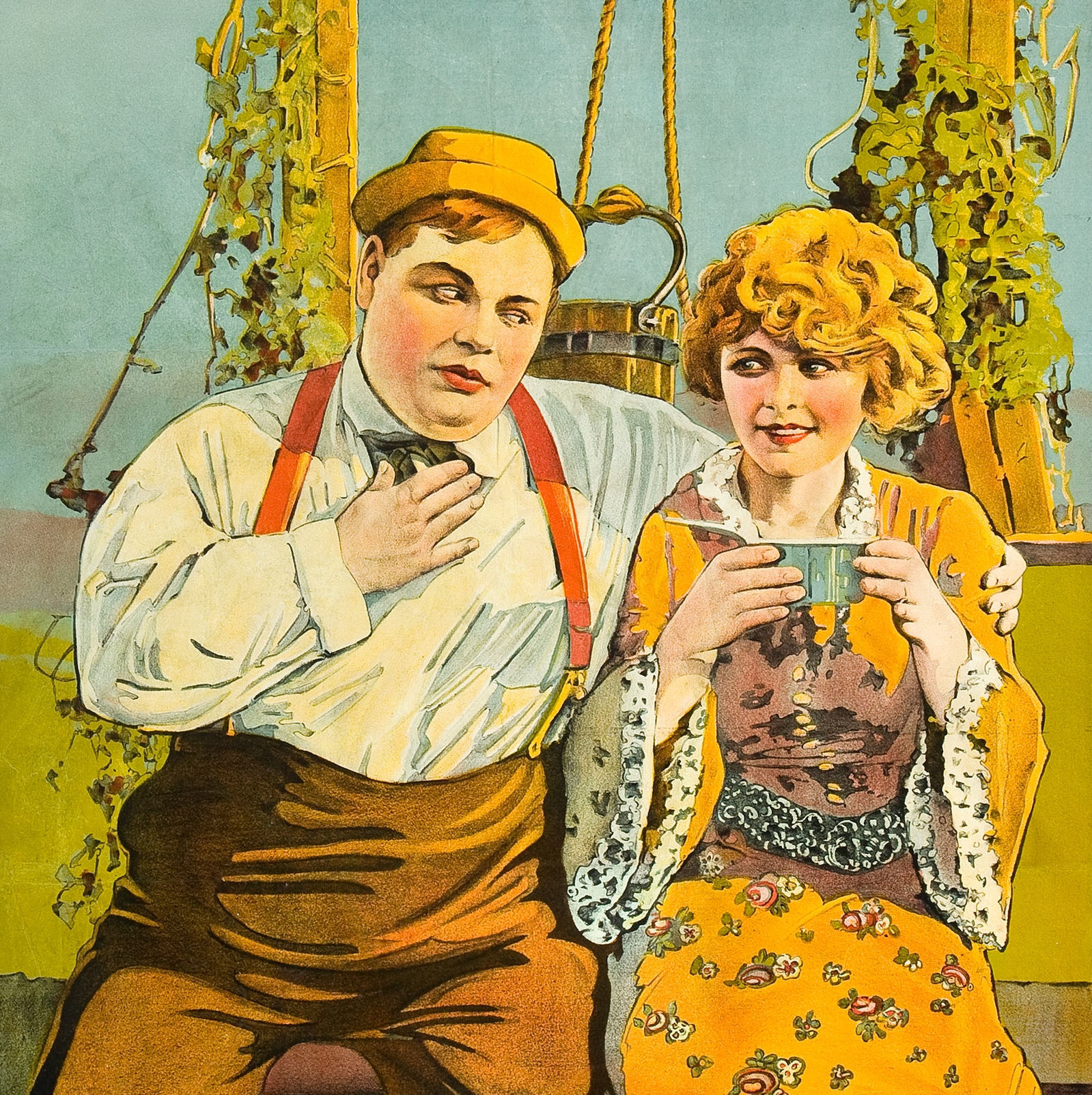
Winifred Westover with Fatty Arbuckle in 1919 film poster for Love

Arbuckle was regarded by those who knew him closely as a good-natured man who was shy around women, and he had been described as "the most chaste man in pictures." However, studio executives, fearing negative publicity by association, warned Arbuckle's industry friends and fellow actors (many of whose careers they controlled) not to publicly defend him. Charlie Chaplin told reporters that he could not believe that Arbuckle was guilty, having known him since they both worked at Keystone in 1914. Chaplin "knew Roscoe to be a genial, easy-going type who would not harm a fly." Buster Keaton issued a public statement in support of Arbuckle that resulted in a mild reprimand from Keaton's studio. Actor William S. Hart, who had never met or worked with Arbuckle, issued a number of damaging public statements presuming Arbuckle's guilt. Arbuckle later wrote a premise for a film parodying Hart as a thief, bully and wifebeater. Keaton purchased the premise, and the resulting film, The Frozen North, was released in 1922, almost a year after the scandal first emerged. Keaton cowrote, directed and starred in the film, and Hart refused to speak to Keaton for many years afterward.

The prosecutor, San Francisco district attorney Matthew Brady, an intensely ambitious man who planned to run for governor, made public pronouncements of Arbuckle's guilt and pressured witnesses to make false statements. In public statements before the trial, Brady declared: "I will get the truth. I do not consider Roscoe Arbuckle entitled to one bit more consideration than those gangsters got from me. He shall be prosecuted with all the force that human energy can achieve." Brady at first featured Delmont as his star witness during the indictment hearing. The defense obtained a letter from Delmont admitting to a plan to extort payment from Arbuckle. Delmont's constantly changing testimony effectively ended any chance of the case proceeding to trial. Ultimately, the judge found no evidence of rape. After hearing testimony from party guest Zey Prevon that Rappe said "Roscoe hurt me" on her deathbed, the judge decided that Arbuckle could be charged with first-degree murder. Brady had originally planned to seek the death penalty, but the charge was later reduced to manslaughter.

After nearly three weeks in jail he was released on bail of $5,000, about $90,000 in today's dollars.

=== Trials ===
Arbuckle's trial was a major media event. The story was fueled by yellow journalism, with many newspapers portraying Arbuckle as a gross lecher who used his weight to overpower innocent girls. William Randolph Hearst's nationwide newspaper chain exploited the situation with exaggerated and sensationalized stories. Hearst was gratified by the profits that he accrued during the Arbuckle scandal, and he allegedly said that it had "sold more newspapers [...] than when the Lusitania went down." Morality groups called for Arbuckle to be sentenced to death. Messages commending Brady's prosecution arrived at his office from across the country, including from the Mayor of St. Paul, Henry Lehman, who wrote: "For God's sake, I have held court with this man and my conscience convicts him."

=== First trial ===
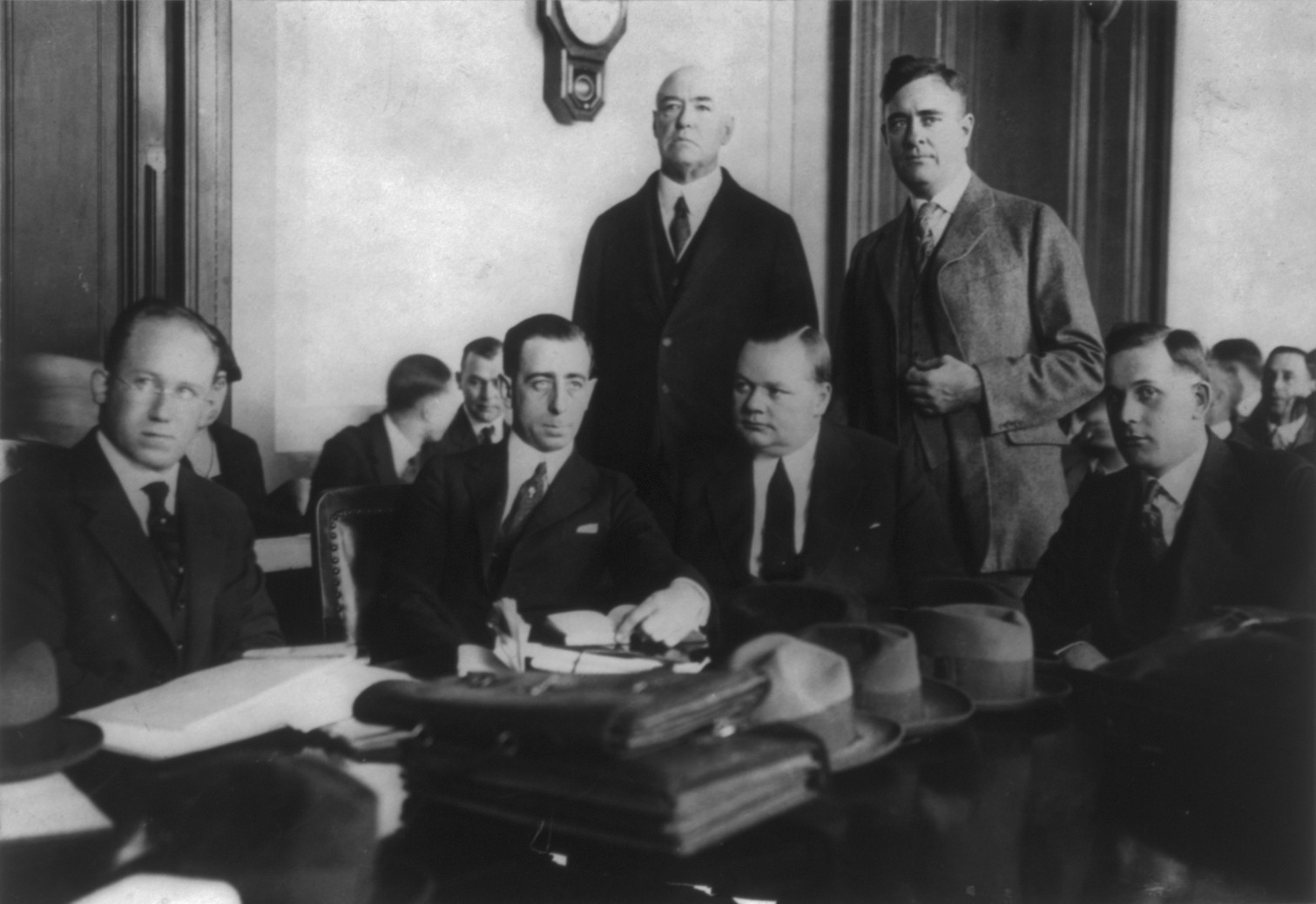
Arbuckle and his defense lawyers at the first trial, November 1921

The trial began on November 14, 1921, in the San Francisco city courthouse. Arbuckle hired as his lead defense counsel Gavin McNab, a competent local attorney. The principal witness was Prevon. At the beginning of the trial, Arbuckle told his estranged wife Minta Durfee that he had not harmed Rappe. Durfee believed him and appeared regularly in the courtroom to support him. Public feeling was so negative that shots were fired at Durfee as she entered the courthouse.

Brady's first witnesses during the trial included model Betty Campbell, who attended the party and testified that she saw Arbuckle with a smile on his face hours after the alleged rape occurred. Another witness, hospital nurse Grace Hultson, testified that it was very likely that Arbuckle raped Rappe and bruised her body in the process. Criminologist Dr. Edward Heinrich testified that fingerprints on the hallway door proved that Rappe had tried to flee, but that Arbuckle had stopped her by placing his hand over hers. Dr. Arthur Beardslee, the hotel doctor who had examined Rappe, testified that an external force seemed to have damaged the bladder. However, during cross-examination, Campbell revealed that Brady had threatened to charge her with perjury if she did not testify against Arbuckle. To counter Heinrich's fingerprint testimony, the defense called Ignatius H. McCarthy, a former investigator for the federal district, as its own fingerprint expert. McCarthy's qualifications were under fire from the prosecution when court adjourned, as he admitted he had never previously testified as a fingerprint expert. Dr. Heinrich's claim to have found fingerprints was cast into doubt after McNab produced a maid from the St. Francis Hotel who testified that she had thoroughly cleaned the room before the investigation took place. Dr. Beardslee admitted that Rappe had never mentioned being assaulted while he was treating her. McNab coaxed Hultson to admit that the rupture of Rappe's bladder could have been the result of cancer and that the bruises could have been caused by the heavy jewelry that Rappe was wearing that evening.

On November 28, Arbuckle testified as the defense's final witness and was reported to be simple, direct and unflustered under both direct and cross-examination. In his testimony, Arbuckle claimed that Rappe (whom he testified to have known for five or six years) entered the party room (1220) around noon that day, and that sometime afterward he retreated to his room (1219) to change clothes after Mae Taub, daughter-in-law of Billy Sunday, asked him for a ride into town. In his room, Arbuckle discovered Rappe in the bathroom vomiting into the toilet. He claimed that Rappe had told him that she felt ill and asked to lie down, and that he carried her into the bedroom and asked a few of the party guests to help treat her. When Arbuckle and a few of the guests entered the room again, they found Rappe on the floor near the bed tearing at her clothing and experiencing violent convulsions. To calm Rappe, they placed her in a bathtub of cool water. Arbuckle and Fischbach then took her to room 1227 and called the hotel manager and doctor. At this point all those present believed that Rappe was just very drunk, including the hotel doctors. Assuming that Rappe's condition would improve if she slept, Arbuckle drove Taub into town.

The prosecution presented medical descriptions of Rappe's bladder as evidence that she had suffered from an illness. In his testimony, Arbuckle denied that he had any knowledge of Rappe's illness. During cross-examination, assistant district attorney Leo Friedman aggressively grilled Arbuckle about Arbuckle's refusal to call a doctor when he found Rappe sick and argued that Arbuckle had refused because he knew of Rappe's illness and saw a perfect opportunity to rape and kill her. Arbuckle calmly maintained that he did not physically hurt or sexually assault Rappe during the party, and he also stated that he had never made any inappropriate sexual advances against any woman in his life. After more than two weeks of testimony with 60 prosecution and defense witnesses, including 18 doctors who testified about Rappe's illness, the defense rested. On December 4, 1921, the jury returned five days later deadlocked after nearly 44 hours of deliberation with a 10–2 not-guilty verdict, and a mistrial was declared.

Arbuckle's attorneys later concentrated on juror Helen Hubbard, who had told other jurors that she would vote guilty "until hell freezes over." She had refused to examine the exhibits or read the trial transcripts, having already decided on Arbuckle's guilt in the courtroom. Hubbard's husband was a lawyer with connections to the district attorney's office, and he expressed surprise that she was not challenged during the voir dire process. Some of the jurors revealed that they believed Arbuckle to be guilty, but not beyond a reasonable doubt. During the deliberations, some jurors joined Hubbard in voting to convict, but all but one eventually changed their vote. Researcher Joan Myers suggests that Arbuckle's defense team targeted Hubbard as a villain because there had been a great deal of media attention on women serving in juries, a practice that had been legalized only four years earlier. Myers also records Hubbard's account of the jury foreman's attempts to pressure her to change her vote. While Hubbard offered explanations on her vote whenever challenged, Thomas Kilkenny, the other juror who voted guilty, remained silent and quickly faded from the media spotlight after the trial ended.

=== Second trial ===
The second trial began on January 11, 1922, with a new jury but with the same legal defense, prosecution and presiding judge as those of the previous trial. The same evidence was presented, but this time, witness Zey Prevon testified that Brady had forced her to lie. Another witness who testified during the first trial, a former studio security guard named Jesse Norgard, testified that Arbuckle had once offered him a cash bribe in exchange for the key to Rappe's dressing room but that Norgard refused. Norgard claimed that Arbuckle stated that he wanted the key to play a joke on Rappe. During cross-examination, Norgard's testimony was impugned when he was revealed to be an ex-convict under indictment for sexually assaulting an eight-year-old girl, and was seeking a sentence reduction from Brady in exchange for his testimony. In contrast to the first trial, Rappe's history of promiscuity and heavy drinking was detailed. The second trial also discredited some major evidence such as the identification of Arbuckle's fingerprints on the hotel bedroom door. Heinrich disowned his testimony from the first trial and stated that the fingerprint evidence was likely faked. The defense was so confident that Arbuckle would be acquitted that they did not call him to testify, and McNab did not deliver a closing argument to the jury. However, some jurors interpreted the refusal to permit Arbuckle to testify as a sign of guilt. After five days and more than 40 hours of deliberation, the jury returned on February 3, deadlocked with a 10–2 majority in favor of conviction, resulting in another mistrial.

=== Third trial ===
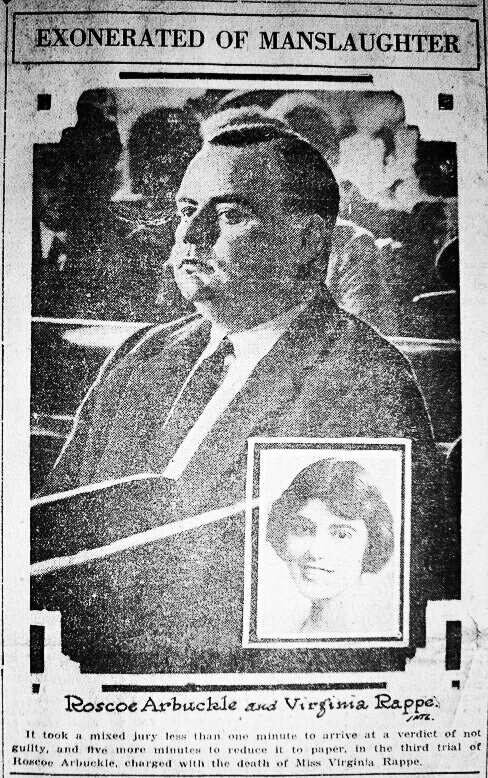
News story of the not-guilty verdict, 1922

By the time of Arbuckle's third trial, his films had been banned and newspapers had been filled for the past seven months with stories of Hollywood orgies, murder and sexual perversion. Delmont was touring the country performing one-woman shows based on her involvement with the case and lecturing on the evils of Hollywood.

The third trial began on March 13, 1922, and McNab took a forceful approach, attacking the prosecution's case with long and aggressive examination and cross-examination of each witness. McNab also introduced more evidence about Rappe's lurid past and medical history. The prosecution's case was weakened because Prevon, a key witness, was out of the country after fleeing police custody and unable to testify. As in the first trial, Arbuckle testified as the final witness and maintained his denial of any wrongdoing. During closing statements, McNab reviewed the flaws in the case and attacked Brady for believing Delmont's outlandish charges, a woman whom McNab described as "the complaining witness who never witnessed." The jury began deliberations April 12 and took only six minutes to return with a unanimous not-guilty verdict. Five of those minutes were spent writing a formal statement of apology to Arbuckle for subjecting him to the ordeal, a dramatic and unusual gesture. The jury statement read:

Acquittal is not enough for Roscoe Arbuckle. We feel that a great injustice has been done him. We feel also that it was only our plain duty to give him this exoneration, under the evidence, for there was not the slightest proof adduced to connect him in any way with the commission of a crime. He was manly throughout the case and told a straightforward story on the witness stand, which we all believed. The happening at the hotel was an unfortunate affair for which Arbuckle, so the evidence shows, was in no way responsible. We wish him success and hope that the American people will take the judgment of fourteen men and woman who have sat listening for thirty-one days to evidence, that Roscoe Arbuckle is entirely innocent and free from all blame.

Rappe's film colleagues said that her doctor forbade her to drink alcohol after multiple abortions left her scarred and weak. Because alcohol was consumed at the party, Arbuckle pleaded guilty to one count of violating the Volstead Act and was ordered to pay a $500 fine (equivalent to $10,000 in 2025). At the time of his acquittal, he owed more than $700,000 (equivalent to $13 million in 2025) in legal fees to his attorneys for the three criminal trials, and he was forced to sell his house and all of his cars to pay some of the debt.

=== Aftermath ===
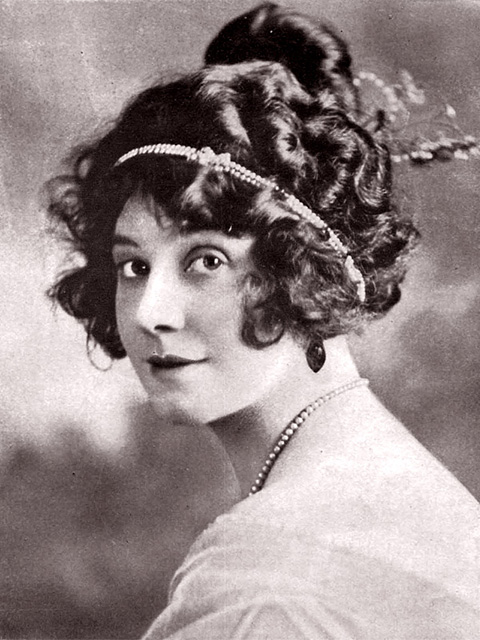
Minta Durfee, cover of Photoplay, December 1915

Following Arbuckle's arrest, hundreds of exhibitors withdrew his films from distribution.

The scandal and trials greatly damaged Arbuckle's popularity among the general public. In spite of the acquittal and the apology, his reputation was not restored and the effects of the scandal continued. Will H. Hays, who served as the head of the newly formed Motion Pictures Producers and Distributors of America censor board, cited Arbuckle as an example of Hollywood's poor morals. On April 18, 1922, six days after Arbuckle's acquittal, Hays issued a lifetime ban that would prohibit Arbuckle from film work. Hays also requested that all showings and bookings of Arbuckle's films be canceled, and exhibitors complied. In December of the same year, under public pressure, Hays rescinded the ban. However, Arbuckle remained unable to secure work as an actor.

Most exhibitors still declined to show Arbuckle's films, several of which are now considered lost. Paramount withdrew his latest film Crazy to Marry after only a brief release, and shelved two features he had already completed: Leap Year and The Fast Freight. The latter films were ultimately released only in Europe, far away from the scandalmongers in America, and recouped at least part of their production costs. In March 1922, with Arbuckle's films banned, Buster Keaton signed an agreement to award Arbuckle 35% of all future profits from his production company Buster Keaton Comedies, hoping to ease Arbuckle's financial situation.

In November 1923, Minta Durfee filed for divorce from Arbuckle, charging grounds of desertion. The divorce was granted the following January. They had been amicably separated since 1921. After a brief reconciliation, Durfee again filed for divorce in December 1924. Arbuckle married Doris Deane on May 16, 1925.

Arbuckle tried returning to filmmaking, but industry resistance to distributing his films continued to linger after his acquittal. He retreated into alcoholism. In the words of his first wife, "Roscoe only seemed to find solace and comfort in a bottle". Keaton attempted to help Arbuckle by employing him for his films. Arbuckle wrote the story for a Keaton short titled Day Dreams (1922) and allegedly directed scenes in Keaton's Sherlock Jr. (1924), but it is unclear how much of Arbuckle's footage remained in the film's final cut. In 1925, Carter DeHaven's short Character Studies, filmed before the scandal, was released, featuring Arbuckle along with Keaton, Harold Lloyd, Rudolph Valentino, Douglas Fairbanks and Jackie Coogan. The same year in Photoplay's August issue, James R. Quirk wrote: "I would like to see Roscoe Arbuckle make a comeback to the screen. ... The American nation prides itself upon its spirit of fair play. We like the whole world to look upon America as the place where every man gets a square deal. Are you sure Roscoe Arbuckle is getting one today? I'm not."

== Pseudonym ==
Eventually, Arbuckle worked as a director under the pseudonym of William Goodrich, his father's first and middle name. Keaton, a frequent punster, later claimed that the name was derived from the satirical alias "Will B. Good".

Between 1924 and 1932, Arbuckle directed a number of comedy shorts under the pseudonym for Educational Pictures that featured lesser-known comics of the day. Louise Brooks, who played the ingenue in Windy Riley Goes Hollywood (1931), told of her experiences working with Arbuckle:

He made no attempt to direct this picture. He just sat in his director's chair like a dead man. He had been very nice and sweetly dead ever since the scandal that ruined his career. But it was such an amazing thing for me to come in to make this broken-down picture, and to find my director was the great Roscoe Arbuckle. Oh, I thought he was magnificent in films. He was a wonderful dancer—a wonderful ballroom dancer, in his heyday. It was like floating in the arms of a huge doughnut—really delightful.

Among the more visible directorial projects under the Goodrich pseudonym was the Eddie Cantor feature Special Delivery (1927), which was released by Paramount and costarred William Powell and Jobyna Ralston. His highest-profile project was arguably The Red Mill, also released in 1927, a Marion Davies vehicle. In 1930 he served as an uncredited gag writer for the Wheeler and Woolsey military comedy Half Shot at Sunrise.

== Roscoe Arbuckle's Plantation Café ==
Arbuckle and Dan Coombs, one of Culver City's first mayors, reopened the Plantation Club near the Metro-Goldwyn-Mayer studios on Washington Boulevard as Roscoe Arbuckle's Plantation Café on August 2, 1928. By 1930, Arbuckle sold his interest and it became known as George Olsen's Plantation Café, later the Plantation Trailer Court and then Foreman Phillips County Barn Dance.

== Second divorce and third marriage ==
In 1929, Doris Deane sued for divorce from Arbuckle in Los Angeles, charging desertion and cruelty. On June 21, 1932, Roscoe married Addie Oakley Dukes McPhail (later Addie Oakley Sheldon, 1905–2003) in Erie, Pennsylvania.

== Brief comeback and death ==
In 1932, Arbuckle signed a contract with Warner Bros. to star under his own name in a series of six two-reel comedies to be filmed at the Vitaphone studios in Brooklyn, New York. These six short films constitute the only samples of Arbuckle's voice, which recorded in a pleasant second-tenor range. Silent-film comedian Al St. John (Arbuckle's nephew) and actors Lionel Stander and Shemp Howard appeared with Arbuckle. The film How've You Bean? features grocery-store gags reminiscent of Arbuckle's 1917 short The Butcher Boy, with vaudeville comic Fritz Hubert as his assistant, dressed like Buster Keaton. The Vitaphone shorts were very successful in the US, although when Warner Bros. attempted to release the first one (Hey, Pop!) in the United Kingdom, the British Board of Film Censors cited the ten-year-old scandal and refused to grant an exhibition certificate.

On June 28, 1933, Arbuckle had finished filming In the Dough, the last of the Vitaphone two-reelers (four of which had already been released). The next day, he signed a contract with Warner Bros. to star in a feature-length film. That night, he met with friends to celebrate his first wedding anniversary and the new contract when he reportedly said: "This is the best day of my life." He suffered a heart attack later that night and died in his sleep at the age of 46. His widow Addie requested that his body be cremated according to Arbuckle's wish.

== Legacy ==
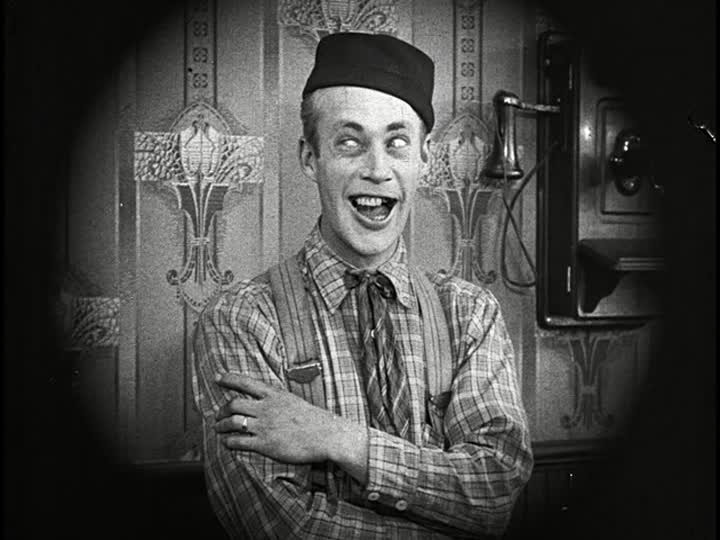
Arbuckle's nephew and frequent costar Al St. John

Many of Arbuckle's films, including the feature The Life of the Party (1920), survive only as worn prints with foreign-language intertitles. As with most American films produced during the silent era, little or no effort was made to preserve original negatives and prints during Hollywood's first two decades, causing most films that included him to be lost. However, it is likely that due to the reputation Arbuckle received around the death of Virginia Rappe, that many studios wished to avoid any negative backlash and purposely destroyed any surviving films in which he had a starring role.

By the early 21st century, some of Arbuckle's short subjects (particularly those co-starring Chaplin or Keaton) had been restored, released on DVD, and even screened theatrically. His early influence on American slapstick comedy is widely recognized.

For his contributions to the film industry, in 1960, some 27 years after his death, Arbuckle was awarded a star on the Hollywood Walk of Fame located at 6701 Hollywood Boulevard.

== In popular culture ==
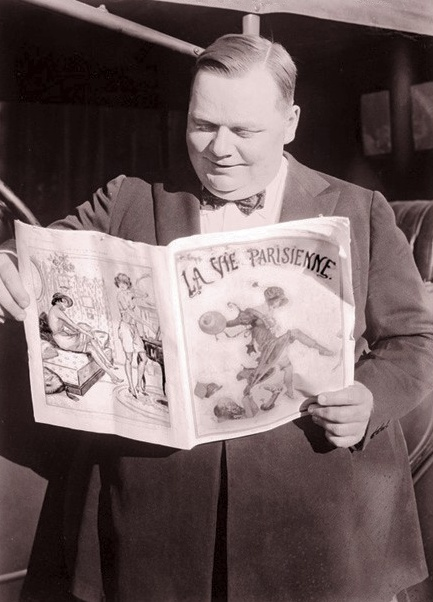
Arbuckle reading La Vie Parisienne, c. 1920

Neil Sedaka refers to Arbuckle, along with Charlie Chaplin, Buster Keaton, Stan Laurel, and Oliver Hardy in his 1971 song "Silent Movies", as heard on his Emergence album.

The James Ivory film The Wild Party (1975) has been repeatedly but incorrectly cited as a film dramatization of the Arbuckle–Rappe scandal. In fact it is loosely based on the 1926 poem by Joseph Moncure March. In this film, James Coco portrays a heavy-set silent film comedian named Jolly Grimm whose career is on the skids, but who is desperately planning a comeback. Raquel Welch portrays his mistress, who ultimately goads him into shooting her. This film was loosely based on the misconceptions surrounding the Arbuckle scandal, yet it bears almost no resemblance to the documented facts of the case.

In Ken Russell's 1977 biopic Valentino, Rudolph Nureyev as a pre-movie star Rudolph Valentino dances in a nightclub before a grossly overweight, obnoxious, and hedonistic celebrity called "Mr. Fatty" (played by William Hootkins), a caricature of Arbuckle rooted in the public view of him created in popular press coverage of the Rappe rape trial. In the scene, Valentino picks up starlet Jean Acker (played by Carol Kane) off a table in which she is sitting in front of Fatty and dances with her, enraging the spoiled star, who becomes apoplectic.

Australian band The Fauves's 1993 debut album Drive Through Charisma ends with a song called "Arbuckle at Glenrowan", which imagines Arbuckle visiting the town of Glenrowan, Victoria where bushranger Ned Kelly was captured in the year 1880.

Before his death in 1997, comedian Chris Farley expressed interest in starring as Arbuckle in a biography film. According to the 2008 biography The Chris Farley Show: A Biography in Three Acts, Farley and screenwriter David Mamet agreed to work together on what would have been Farley's first dramatic role. In 2007, director Kevin Connor planned a film, The Life of the Party, based on Arbuckle's life. It was to star Chris Kattan and Preston Lacy. However, the project was shelved. Like Farley, comedians John Belushi and John Candy also considered playing Arbuckle, but each of them died before a biopic was made. Farley's film was signed with Vince Vaughn as his co-star.

In April and May 2006, the Museum of Modern Art in New York City mounted a 56-film, month-long retrospective of all of Arbuckle's known surviving work, running the entire series twice.

Arbuckle is the subject of a 2004 novel titled I, Fatty by author Jerry Stahl. The Day the Laughter Stopped by David Yallop and Frame-Up! The Untold Story of Roscoe "Fatty" Arbuckle by Andy Edmonds are other books on Arbuckle's life. The 1963 novel Scandal in Eden by Garet Rogers is a fictionalized version of the Arbuckle scandal.

Fatty Arbuckle's was an American-themed restaurant chain in the UK named after Arbuckle.

The 2009 novel Devil's Garden is based on the Arbuckle trials. The main character in the story is Dashiell Hammett, a Pinkerton detective in San Francisco at the time of the trials.

NOFX's 2012 album Self Entitled has a song called "I, Fatty" about Arbuckle.

The 2021 French graphic novel Fatty : le premier roi d'Hollywood, by Nadar and Julien Frey, portrays the period from Arbuckle's early days in Hollywood to his death.

The character Orville Pickwick in Damien Chazelle's 2022 film Babylon, played by Troy Metcalf, is based on Arbuckle .

In Curb Your Enthusiasm's Season 12 Episode 8, "The Colostomy Bag," Larry David in discussion with Conan O'Brien claims that Arbuckle attacked a stranger with a beer bottle after being spoken to in public.

During the third season of Hacks, a biopic about Arbuckle becomes a central part of the plot starting with episode 7, "The Deborah Vance Christmas Spectacular." In the episode, Christopher Lloyd plays a fictional grandson of Arbuckle's (in real life Arbuckle had no children).

== See also ==
- List of actors with Hollywood Walk of Fame motion picture stars
- List of American comedy films
