= Spofford, Texas =

- City
- Coordinates: 29°10′22″N 100°24′41″W
- Country: United States
- State: Texas
- County: Kinney

Area
  - Total: 0.24 sq mi (0.62 km^{2})
  - Land: 0.24 sq mi (0.62 km^{2})
  - Water: 0 sq mi (0.00 km^{2})
- Elevation: 1,011 ft (308 m)

Population (2020)
  - Total: 41
  - Density: 170/sq mi (66/km^{2})
- Time zone: UTC-6 (Central (CST))
  - Summer (DST): UTC-5 (CDT)
- ZIP Code: 78877
- Area code: 830
- FIPS code: 48-69560
- GNIS feature ID: 1368916

Spofford is a city in Kinney County, Texas, United States. The population was 41 at the 2020 census.

== Geography ==
Spofford is located in southern Kinney County at 29°10′22″N 100°24′41″W (29.172681, –100.411388). It is on the east side of Texas State Highway 131, which leads north 10 miles (16 km) to Brackettville, the county seat, and south 24 miles (39 km) to U.S. Route 277 in the Rio Grande valley.

According to the United States Census Bureau, Spofford has a total area of 0.2 square miles (0.6 km^{2}), all land.

== Demographics ==
Historical population
Census	Pop.	Note	%±
1950	246		—
1960	138		−43.9%
1970	69		−50.0%
1980	77		11.6%
1990	68		−11.7%
2000	75		10.3%
2010	95		26.7%
2020	41		−56.8%
U.S. Decennial Census; 2020 Census

=== 2020 census ===
As of the 2020 census, Spofford had a population of 41. The median age was 52.5 years. 17.1% of residents were under the age of 18 and 29.3% of residents were 65 years of age or older. For every 100 females there were 70.8 males, and for every 100 females age 18 and over there were 70.0 males age 18 and over.

0.0% of residents lived in urban areas, while 100.0% lived in rural areas.

There were 18 households in Spofford, of which 33.3% had children under the age of 18 living in them. Of all households, 50.0% were married-couple households, 33.3% were households with a male householder and no spouse or partner present, and 16.7% were households with a female householder and no spouse or partner present. About 16.7% of all households were made up of individuals and 5.6% had someone living alone who was 65 years of age or older.

There were 25 housing units, of which 28.0% were vacant. The homeowner vacancy rate was 0.0% and the rental vacancy rate was 100.0%.

Racial composition as of the 2020 census
Race	Number	Percent
White	20	48.8%
Black or African American	1	2.4%
American Indian and Alaska Native	0	0.0%
Asian	0	0.0%
Native Hawaiian and Other Pacific Islander	0	0.0%
Some other race	5	12.2%
Two or more races	15	36.6%
Hispanic or Latino (of any race)	26	63.4%

=== 2000 census ===
As of the census of 2000, 75 people, 24 households, and 19 families resided in the city. The population density was 299 inhabitants per square mile (115/km^{2}). The 38 housing units averaged 151.4/sq mi (58.7/km^{2}). The racial makeup of the city was 81.33% White, 18.67% from other races. Hispanics or Latinos of any race were 52.00% of the population.

Of the 24 households, 50.0% had children under the age of 18 living with them, 66.7% were married couples living together, 8.3% had a female householder with no husband present, and 16.7% were not families. About 16.7% of all households were made up of individuals, and 16.7% had someone living alone who was 65 years of age or older. The average household size was 3.13 and the average family size was 3.45.

In the city, the population was distributed as 29.3% under the age of 18, 5.3% from 18 to 24, 30.7% from 25 to 44, 17.3% from 45 to 64, and 17.3% who were 65 years of age or older. The median age was 40 years. For every 100 females, there were 92.3 males. For every 100 females age 18 and over, there were 103.8 males.

The median income for a household in the city was $39,583, and for a family was $39,583. Males had a median income of $36,250 versus $11,250 for females. The per capita income for the city was $36,485. Around 5.3% of families and 11.8% of the population were living below the poverty line, including 17.4% of those under 18 and none of those over 64.

== History ==
Spofford was named after C.K. Spofford, who opened a hotel in town shortly after the railroad came through in 1882. The town grew around the hotel and was granted a post office in 1884. By 1896, the town had its first school, and by 1900, it had 100 residents.

The Galveston, Harrisburg and San Antonio Railroad (later part of the Southern Pacific Railroad, and today part of the Union Pacific Railroad) had chosen Spofford over Brackettville. At Spofford, they laid a spur to Eagle Pass, and the main line continued west to Langtry. At various times, Spofford was a stop on the Sunset Limited. Amtrak’s Sunset Limited passes through the town on Union Pacific tracks, but makes no stop. A stop is located 30 miles northwest in Del Rio.

The population reached the high-water mark of 373 people in the mid-1940s. After the school consolidations in the '40s, Spofford's students were bused to Brackettville. In 1961, the population was only 138, and it went as low as 54 people in the mid-1970s.

== Education ==
Spofford is served by the Brackett Independent School District.
