= A Social Cub =

1916 film directed by Clarence G. Badger

- Directed by: Clarence G. Badger
- Written by: Harry Wulze
- Produced by: Mack Sennett (Keystone)
- Starring: Gloria Swanson
- Cinematography: J.C. Bitzer
- Distributed by: Triangle Film Corporation
- Release date: July 26, 1916
- Running time: 20 minutes; 2 reels
- Country: United States
- Languages: Silent; English intertitles

A Social Cub is a 1916 short silent comedy film directed by Clarence G. Badger and starring Gloria Swanson.

== Cast ==
- Elizabeth De Witt
- Gonda Durand
- Harry Gribbon
- Reggie Morris
- Blanche Payson
- Della Pringle
- Gloria Swanson
- Josef Swickard
- Bobby Vernon as Bobby

== Preservation ==
The existence of surviving prints is unknown.
