= National Register of Historic Places listings in Kinney County, Texas =

Location of Kinney County in Texas

This is a list of the National Register of Historic Places listings in Kinney County, Texas.

This is intended to be a complete list of properties and districts listed on the National Register of Historic Places in Kinney County, Texas. There are one district and one individual property listed on the National Register in the county. The individual property is both a State Antiquities Landmark and a Recorded Texas Historic Landmark while the district contains multiple Recorded Texas Historic Landmarks.

This National Park Service list is complete through NPS recent listings posted March 21, 2025.

== Current listings ==
The locations of National Register properties and districts may be seen in a mapping service provided.

	Name on the Register	Image	Date listed	Location	City or town	Description
1	1911 Kinney County Courthouse	1911 Kinney County Courthouse	March 22, 2004 (#04000230)	501 S. Ann St. 29°18′48″N 100°25′03″W	Brackettville	State Antiquities Landmark, Recorded Texas Historic Landmark
2	Fort Clark Historic District	Fort Clark Historic District	December 6, 1979 (#79002990)	Off U.S. 90; 29°18′16″N 100°25′23″W	Brackettville	Recorded Texas Historic Landmarks

== See also ==
- National Register of Historic Places listings in Texas
- Recorded Texas Historic Landmarks in Kinney County
