= Amanda, Texas =

Ghost town in Texas, US

- Ghost town
- Location in Texas
- Coordinates: 29.3718985°N 100.6578651°W
- Country: United States
- State: Texas
- County: Kinney
- Elevation: 1,076 ft (328 m)

Amanda, or Olds, is a ghost town in Kinney County, Texas, United States. It was established in the 1880s as a stop on the Texas and New Orleans Railroad. The community was named for the wife of a local landowner, Amanda Dignowity. A post office operated from 1888 to 1890. It peaked with a population of 25, and was abandoned by 1909.
