= Bob Kortman =

American actor

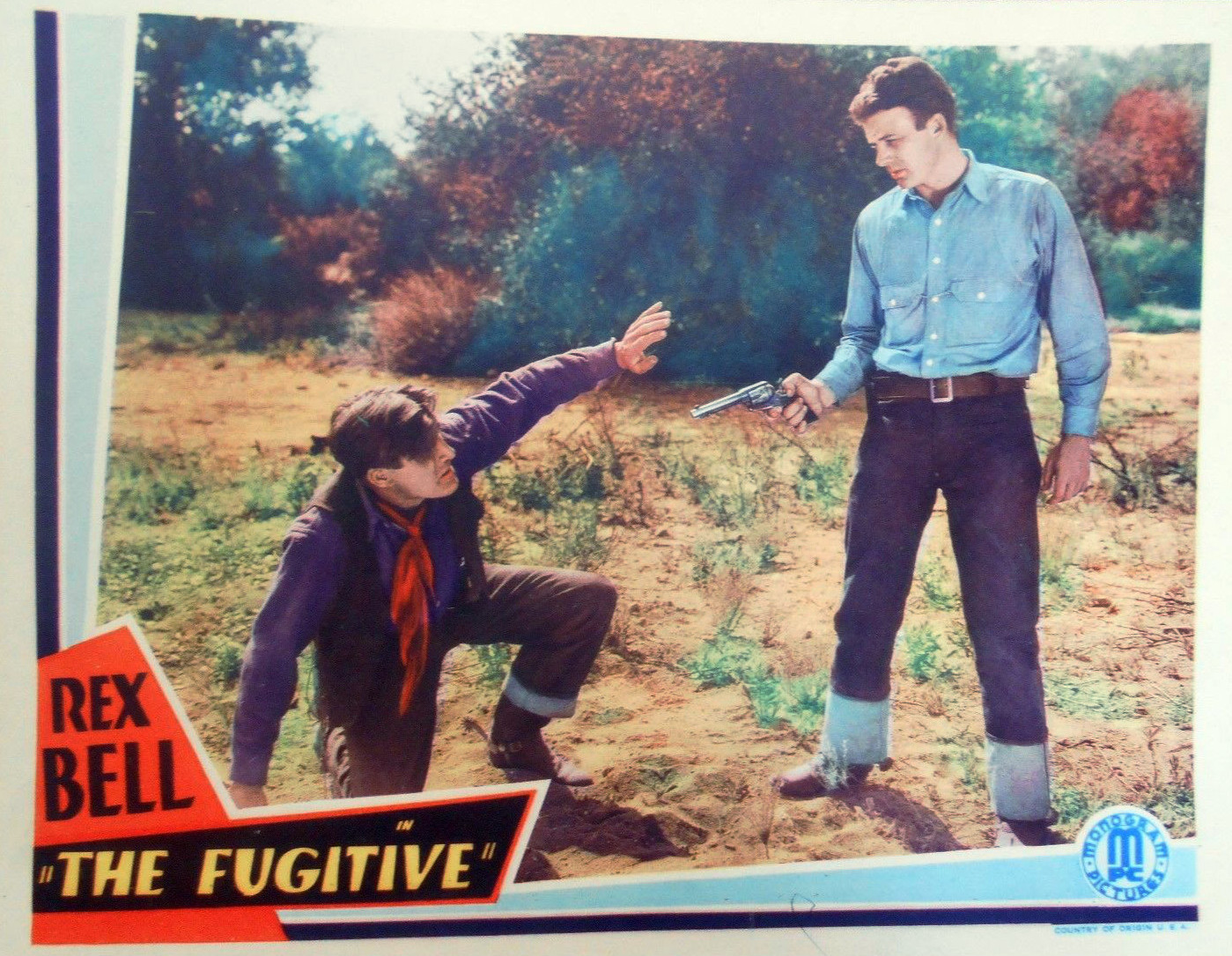
- Lobby card for The Fugitive (1933) with Kortman (left) and Rex Bell
- Born: Robert F. Kortman; December 24, 1887; Brackettville, Texas
- Died: March 13, 1967 (aged 79); Long Beach, California
- Occupation: Actor
- Years active: 1914-1952
- Spouse: Gonda Durand

Robert F. Kortman (December 24, 1887 – March 13, 1967) was an American film actor mostly associated with westerns, though he also appeared in a number of Laurel and Hardy comedies. He appeared in more than 260 films between 1914 and 1952.

== Biography ==
The son of a rancher, Kortman was born in Brackettville, Texas, in 1887. He spent six years in the U.S. cavalry.

Director Tom Ince cast Kortman as a villain when he began working in films in 1911, and he went on to become the "favored on-screen opponent" for William S. Hart with regard to their film fights.

After he left acting, Kortman was president of a cooperative water company in Arrowhead Springs, California, where he lived.

Kortman was married to Gonda Durand, a Mack Sennett bathing beauty. He died in Long Beach, California from cancer.

== Selected filmography ==
- Cactus Nell (1917)
- The Narrow Trail (1917)
- Through the Wrong Door (1919)
- The Great Radium Mystery (1919)
- Godless Men (1920)
- Winners of the West (1921)
- Travelin' On (1922)
- The Lone Hand (1922)
- Another Man's Boots (1922)
- The Shock (1923)
- All the Brothers Were Valiant (1923)
- His Last Race (1923)
- The White Sheep (1924)
- The Temptress (1926)
- The Eagle of the Sea (1926)
- Unseen Enemies (1926)
- The Devil Horse (1926)
- Duck Soup (1927)
- Hills of Peril (1927)
- The Noose (1928)
- Four Sons (1928)
- Fleetwing (1928)
- The Black Watch (1929)
- Devil-May-Care (1929)
- Bear Shooters (1930)
- The Lone Defender (1930)
- Women Everywhere (1930)
- Trader Horn (1931) (scenes deleted)
- The Vanishing Legion (1931)
- The Lightning Warrior (1931)
- Pardon Us (1931)
- The Last Parade (1931)
- Beau Hunks (1931)
- The Fighting Fool (1932)
- The Last of the Mohicans (1932)
- Come On, Tarzan (1932)
- The Forty-Niners (1932)
- The Pride of the Legion (1932)
- The Whispering Shadow (1933)
- Before Midnight (1933)
- The Midnight Patrol (1933)
- The Fugitive (1933)
- Rainbow Ranch (1933)
- Mystery Mountain (1934)
- The Miracle Rider (1935)
- Lawless Range (1935)
- Wild Mustang (1935)
- The Lonely Trail (1936)
- Winds of the Wasteland (1936)
- The Vigilantes Are Coming (1936)
- Robinson Crusoe of Clipper Island (1936)
- Romance Rides the Range (1936)
- Wild West Days (1937)
- Luck of Roaring Camp (1937)
- Anything for a Thrill (1937)
- Sandflow (1937)
- Texas Trail (1937)
- Adventures of Red Ryder (1940)
- Lady from Louisiana (1941)
- The Lone Rider Rides On (1941)
- Fugitive Valley (1941)
- Thundering Hoofs (1942)
- Days of Old Cheyenne (1943)
- Black Hills Express (1943)
- Lucky Cowboy (1944)
- Stagecoach Outlaws (1945)
