= Anacacho, Texas =

Ghost town in Texas, US

- Ghost town
- Location in Texas
- Coordinates: 29.1910723°N 100.3006288°W
- Country: United States
- State: Texas
- County: Kinney
- Elevation: 978 ft (298 m)

Anacacho, formerly Leonhard, is a ghost town in Kinney County, Texas, United States. Situated on the Galveston, Harrisburg and San Antonio Railway, it was established in 1884 with a depot named Leonhard. The community was renamed to Anacacho by 1909. It was abandoned by 1946.
