= Fort Clark Springs, Texas =

- Census-designated place
- Location in Texas and the United States Fort Clark Springs (the United States)
- Coordinates: 29°17′57″N 100°25′21″W
- Country: United States
- State: Texas
- County: Kinney

Area
  - Total: 2.98 sq mi (7.73 km^{2})
  - Land: 2.97 sq mi (7.70 km^{2})
  - Water: 0.012 sq mi (0.03 km^{2})
- Elevation: 1,152 ft (351 m)

Population (2020)
  - Total: 1,215
  - Density: 409/sq mi (158/km^{2})
- Time zone: UTC-6 (Central (CST))
  - Summer (DST): UTC-5 (CDT)
- ZIP Code: 78832 (Brackettville)
- Area code: 830
- FIPS code: 48-26680
- GNIS feature ID: 1357581

Fort Clark Springs is an unincorporated community and census-designated place (CDP) in Kinney County, Texas, United States. As of the 2020 census, Fort Clark Springs had a population of 1,215. It is the site of the former Fort Clark, now a historic district.

== Geography ==
The community is located in central Kinney County and is bordered to the north by Brackettville, the county seat. U.S. Route 90 runs along the border between the two communities, leading east 39 miles (63 km) to Uvalde and west 30 miles (48 km) to Del Rio. Texas State Highway 131 runs along the eastern edge of the CDP, leading south 33 miles (53 km) to U.S. Route 277 in the Rio Grande valley.

According to the United States Census Bureau, the CDP has a total area of 3.0 square miles (7.7 km^{2}), of which 0.01 square miles (0.03 km^{2}), or 0.36%, are water.

== Demographics ==
Historical population
Census	Pop.	Note	%±
2010	1,228		—
2020	1,215		−1.1%
U.S. Decennial Census; 1850–1900 1910; 1920 1930 1940; 1950 1960 1970; 1980 1990 2000; 2010 2020

Fort Clark Springs first appeared as a census designated place in the 2010 U.S. census.

=== 2020 census ===
Fort Clark Springs CDP, Texas – Racial and ethnic composition Note: the US Census treats Hispanic/Latino as an ethnic category. This table excludes Latinos from the racial categories and assigns them to a separate category. Hispanics/Latinos may be of any race.
Race / Ethnicity (NH = Non-Hispanic)	Pop 2010	Pop 2020	% 2010	% 2020
White alone (NH)	926	798	75.41%	65.68%
Black or African American alone (NH)	15	4	1.22%	0.33%
Native American or Alaska Native alone (NH)	12	15	0.98%	1.23%
Asian alone (NH)	10	9	0.81%	0.74%
Native Hawaiian or Pacific Islander alone (NH)	0	0	0.00%	0.00%
Other race alone (NH)	0	11	0.00%	0.91%
Mixed race or Multiracial (NH)	11	42	0.90%	3.46%
Hispanic or Latino (any race)	254	336	20.68%	27.65%
Total	1,228	1,215	100.00%	100.00%
