= 27th Cavalry Regiment (United States) =

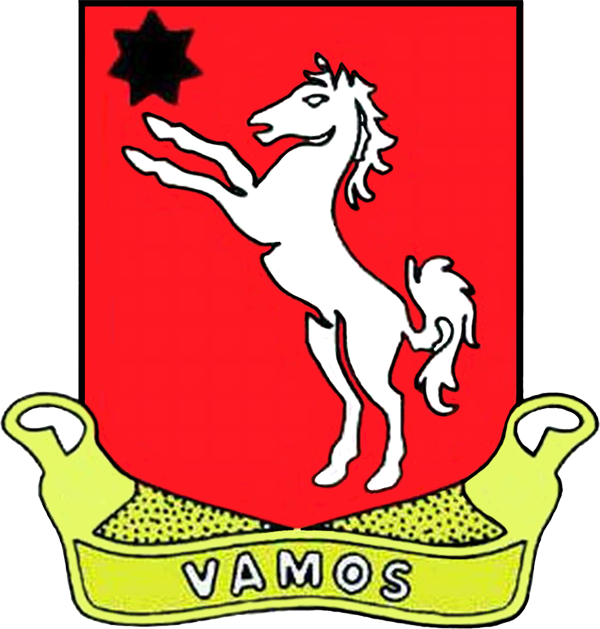
- 27th Cavalry Regiment Insignia.
- Active: 1943-44
- Disbanded: 1944
- Country: United States
- Branch: Army
- Type: Cavalry
- Size: Regiment
- Garrison/HQ: Fort Clark, Texas
- Motto: "Vamos"
- Engagements: World War II

The 27th Cavalry Regiment (Note: The unit's official designation was 27th Cavalry Regiment (Horse) (Colored)) was a short-lived African American unit of the United States Army. The regiment was formed as part of the 2nd Cavalry Division in 1943 and inactivated in north Africa in 1944 without seeing combat.

== History ==
The regiment was formed at Fort Clark, Texas on 25 February 1943 and assigned to the 5th Cavalry Brigade of the 2nd Division. The regiment shipped out on 28 February 1944 from Hampton Roads, Virginia. A little over two weeks after arrival in Algeria, the 2nd Cavalry Division and its component regiments were inactivated. Troops from the 27th Cavalry were given the option of transferring to service units or volunteering for combat. Some troops from the 27th Cavalry were used to activate the 6404th Port Battalion.

The regiment was formally disbanded on 12 December 1951.

== See also ==
- List of armored and cavalry regiments of the United States Army

== Sources ==
- Stanton, Shelby. (1991). World War II Order of Battle, New York: Galahad Books.
