= Felix on the Job =

1916 short film

- Directed by: George Felix
- Written by: Harry Wulze
- Produced by: Joe De Grasse
- Starring: Lon Chaney; George Felix
- Distributed by: Victor Films; Universal Pictures
- Release date: October 31, 1916
- Running time: 1 reel (10 minutes)
- Country: United States
- Language: Silent with English intertitles

Felix on the Job is a 1916 American short silent comedy film produced by Joseph De Grasse, directed by George Felix, written by Harry Wulze, and starring George Felix and Lon Chaney. (The Michael Blake book on Chaney states that Joseph De Grasse both produced and directed the film himself, and that George Felix just starred in it. He also spelled the writer's name "Harry Wielze" for some reason.) The film is considered lost.

== Plot ==
Felix arrives at work in a really bad mood. Everything has been going wrong for him today, including being forced to ride to work on a moving "dolly". He is assigned to shingle a roof on a house by the river belonging to Tod. Felix goes to work, but one accident after another occurs, and he ends up destroying the roof instead of repairing it. The film degrades into a series of slapstick scenes from here on. He gets into a fight with Tod and his two sons, and they accidentally set fire to the house which winds up collapsing into the river. Tod and the boys throw Felix into the river, but in revenge, Felix manages to drive Tod's entire family into the drink.

== Cast ==
- George Felix as Felix
- Eva Loring as Felix's Wife
- Lon Chaney as Tod
- Lydia Yeamans Titus as Tod's Wife

== Reception ==
"There is no story here, simply a lot of gags which are worked one after another. They are all on the practical joke order, and while some of them succeed in getting a laugh there are too many of them for real enjoyment. Among other things, a house is completely wrecked. George Felix directed and heads the cast himself, cavorting about in what is termed a scenario by Harry Wulze." ---Motion Picture News
