= Harry Wulze =

American film producer

Harry Wulze was a writer and producer of films. He wrote and produced the 1916 film Kitty from the City. He wrote the screenplays for Victor Films' short films.

He worked on the 1912 Kalem Company film Kentucky Girl. He worked for Scenario Editor Hampton Del Ruth in 1915 at the Keystone Studio and owned a Hupmobile roadster. He was engaged to a socialite.

== Filmography ==
- The Taming of Sunnybrook Nell (1914), writer
- Innocent Villain (1915), writer and producer
- Felix on the Job (1916), writer
- A Social Cub (1916), writer
- Kitty from the City (1916), writer and producer Bobby Vernon starred
- A Charming Villain (1916)
- The Inspector's Double (1916), screenplay from a story by Charles J. Wilson Jr.
- Scrappily Married, story
- Victor on the Job (1916), writer
- Musical Madness, writer
- The Dark Secret, film adaptation from a story by Sheeba Canne
- A Janitor's Vendetta (1916), writer
- Beans and Bullets (1916), screenplay from a story by J. Barney Furey
- A Pirate Bold (1917), writer
- The Bath House Scandal (1918), writer
- Hearts and Hammers (1921), story and directed
- Knock 'Em Cold (1922), story
- Mum's the Word (1921), story
- Artistic Enemies (1921), story
- A Counter Plot (1921), story
