= Gonda Durand =

American actress

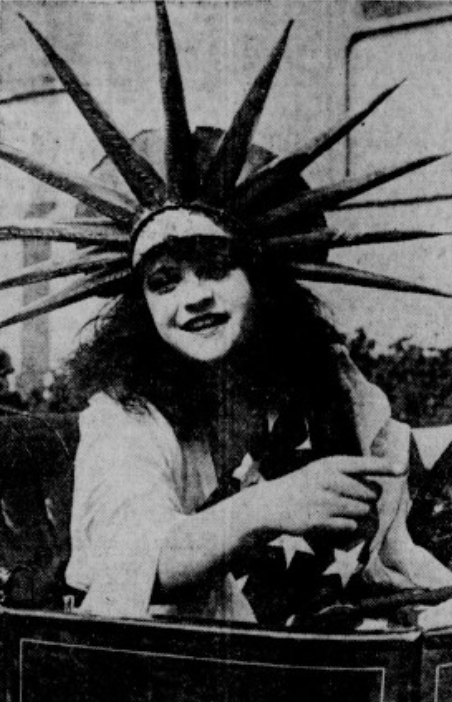
- Durand, dressed as Miss Liberty, from a 1917 newspaper
- Born: Lillian Geraldine Fulton; July 28, 1896; Louisville, Kentucky, U.S.
- Died: August 16, 1960 (aged 64); San Bernardino, California, U.S.
- Other names: Gonda Lillian Wilson, Gonda Kortman
- Occupations: Actress, model
- Spouse: Bob Kortman

Gonda Durand Kortman (July 28, 1896 – August 16, 1960), born Lillian Geraldine Fulton, was an American actress and model in silent films. She was a member of Mack Sennett's Bathing Beauties in the 1910s.

== Personal life ==
Durand was born in Louisville, Kentucky, the daughter of William H. Fulton and Mary E. Duncan Fulton. She graduated from Los Angeles High School in 1913, and soon married Peter James Wilson in Los Angeles; they divorced in 1922. She married her second husband, actor Bob Kortman, in 1924. She died in 1960, at the age of 64, in California.

== Career ==
Durand was one of Mack Sennett's Bathing Beauties in the 1910s, and appeared in a few dozen short comedies between 1916 and 1919, usually in a supporting role as a pretty young woman. She also sold Liberty Bonds, and posed for publicity photos with her Maxwell car.

== Filmography ==
- A Social Cub (1916)
- Hula Hula Land (1917)
- The Sultan's Wife (1917)
- Thirst (1917)
- Hobbled Hearts (1917)
- His Speedy Finish (1917)
- Caught in the End (1917)
- Taming Target Center (1917)
- A Bedroom Blunder (1917)
- Roping Her Romeo (1917)
- Watch Your Neighbor (1918)
- Whose Little Wife Are You?(1918)
- Sheriff Nell's Tussle (1918)
- His Smothered Love (1918)
- His Last False Step (1919)
- His Wife's Friend (1919)
