= Fort Clark, Texas =

- Fort Clark Historic District
- U.S. National Register of Historic Places
- U.S. Historic district
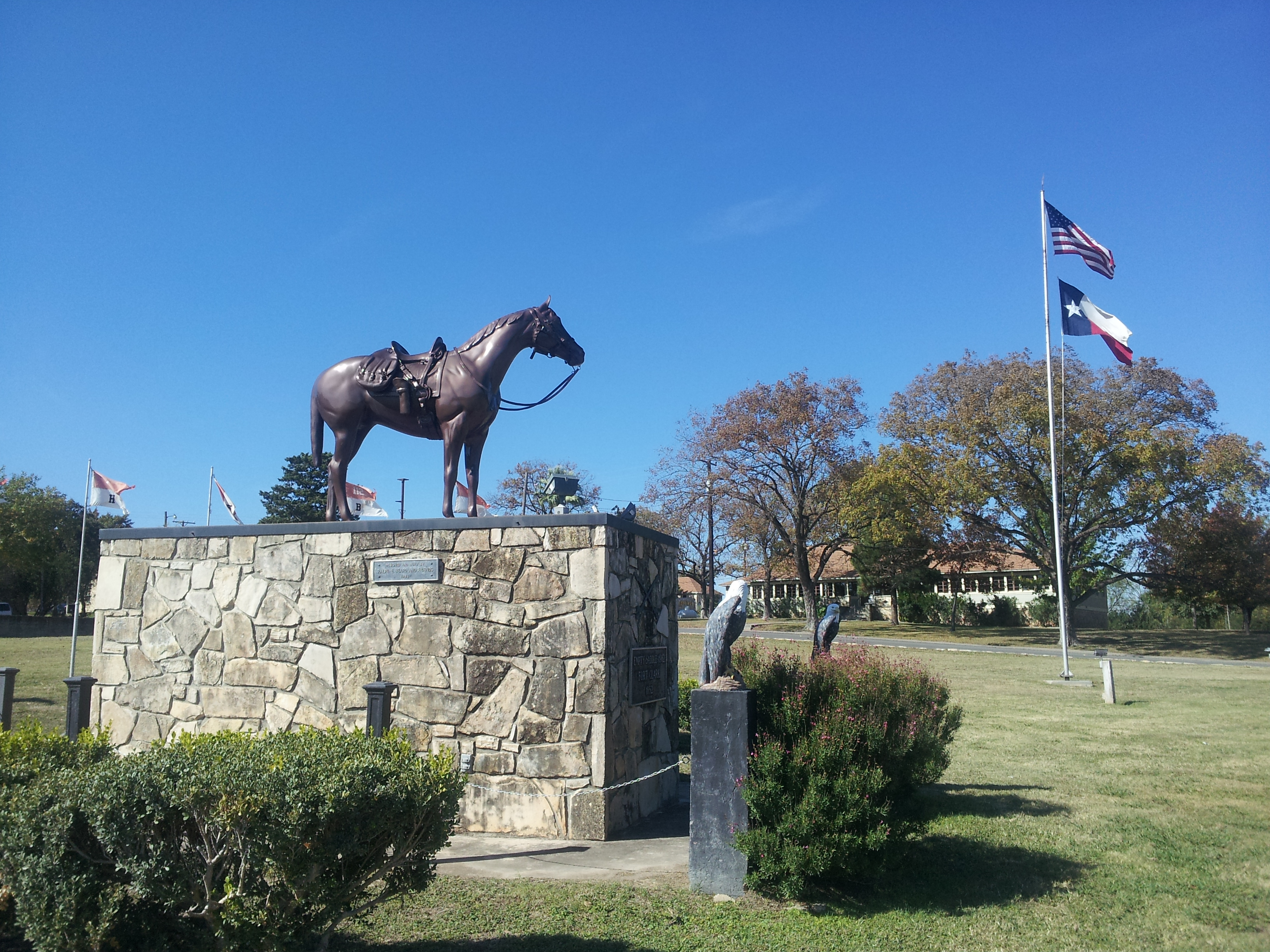
- Fort Clark

- Location within Texas Location within the United States
- Location: Off US 90, Brackettville, Texas
- Coordinates: 29°18′16″N 100°25′23″W
- Area: 88 acres (36 ha)
- Built: 1857
- NRHP reference No.: 79002990
- Added to NRHP: December 6, 1979

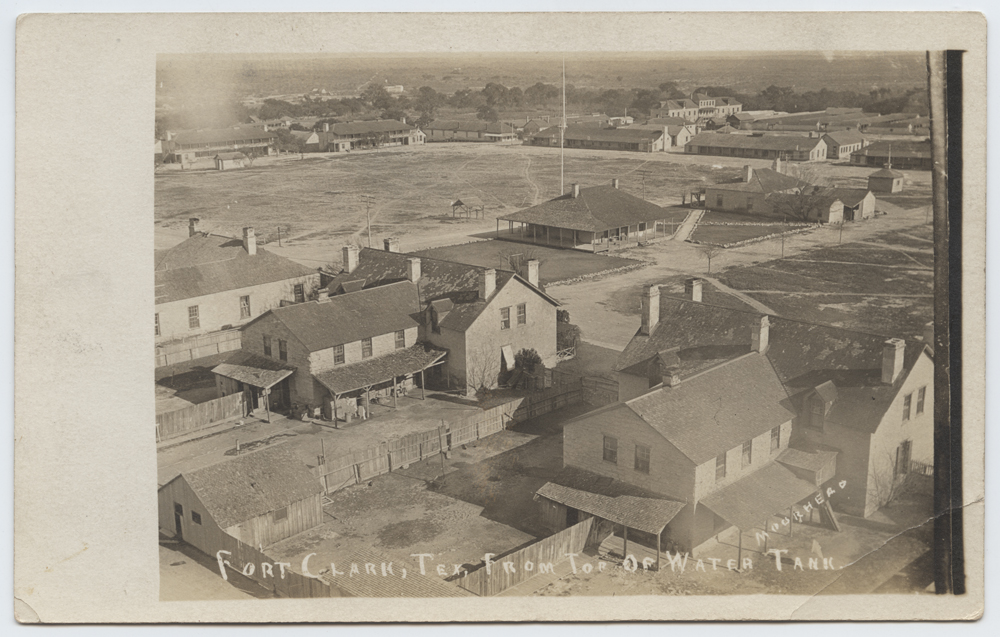
c. 1910-1918

Fort Clark was a frontier fort located just off U.S. Route 90 near Brackettville, in Kinney County, Texas, United States. It later became the headquarters for the 2nd Cavalry Division. The Fort Clark Historic District was added to the National Register of Historic Places on December 6, 1979. The Commanding Officer's Quarters at Fort Clark were designated a Recorded Texas Historic Landmark in 1988. The Fort Clark Guardhouse became a Recorded Texas Historic Landmark in 1962. The Fort Clark Officers' Row Quarters were designated a Recorded Texas Historic Landmark in 1991.

The area is now known as the Fort Clark Springs census-designated place, with a population of 1,228 at the 2010 census.

== Old Fort Clark Guardhouse Museum ==
The Old Fort Clark Guardhouse Museum is operated by the Fort Clark Historical Society. Located in the historic guardhouse, the museum features exhibits about the fort's history, including uniforms, weapons, photographs, and memorabilia, with a special focus on artifacts from several African-American military units, including the Black Seminole Scouts and the Buffalo Soldiers of the 24th and 25th U.S. Infantries.

== Founding ==
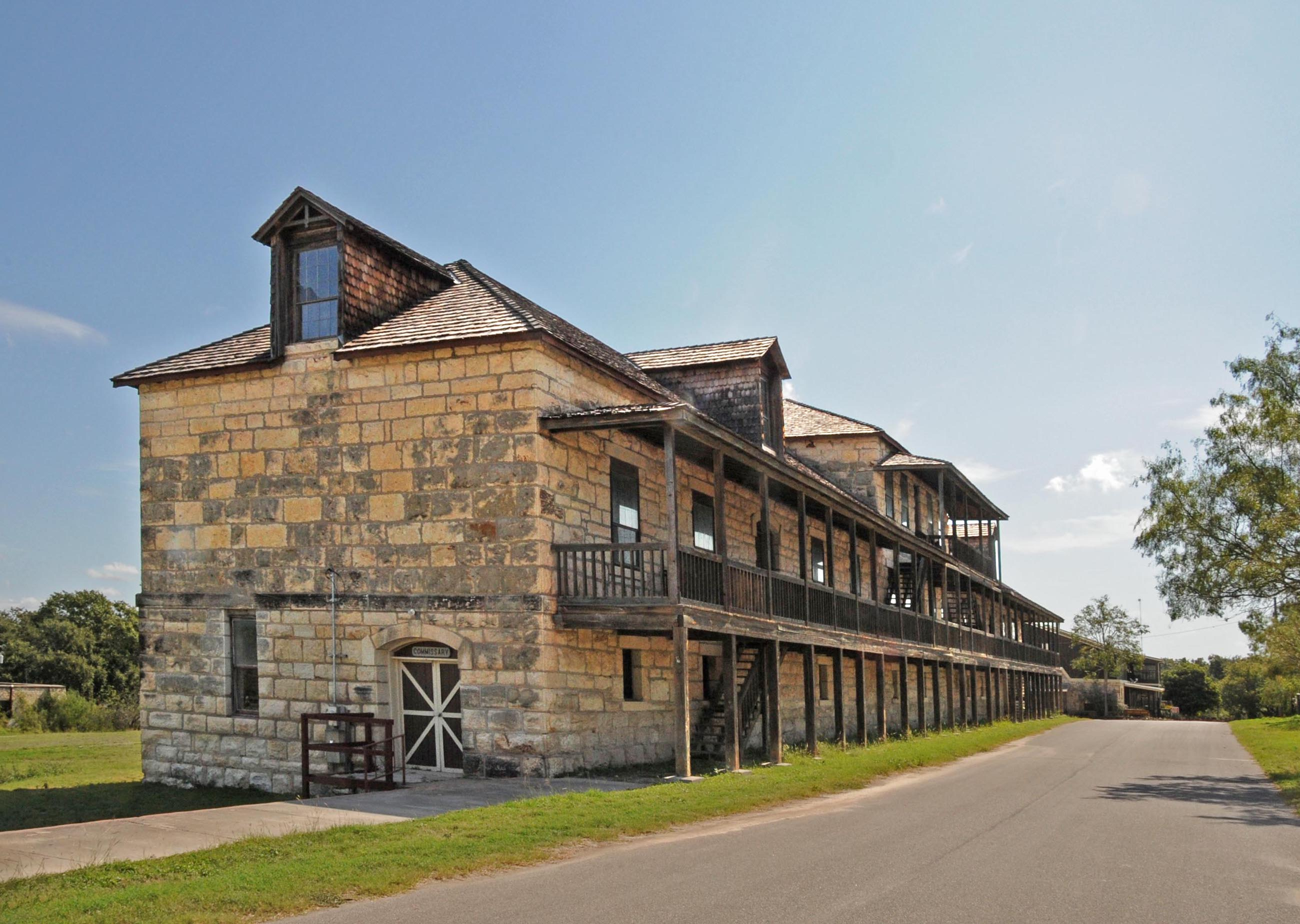
Commissary

The land that became Fort Clark was owned by Samuel A. Maverick when its potential for military development was recognized by William H.C. Whiting and William F. Smith in 1849. Whiting and Smith were actually engaged in surveying the path of the San Antonio–El Paso Road when they came upon the Las Moras Springs ("Mulberry Springs") at the headwaters of Las Moras Creek. They told their superiors that they believed the high ground above the springs would be an appropriate place for a fort. The fort was strategically located as anchor to the cordon of army posts that had been established along the southwest Texas border after the Mexican War. The fort's purpose was to guard the Mexican border, to protect the military road to El Paso, and to defend against Indian depredations arising from either side of the Rio Grande.

On June 20, 1852, the military made use of it, placing Companies C and E of the 1st US Infantry Regiment under the command of Maj. Joseph H. LaMotte, and a detachment of riflemen of the U.S. Mounted Rifles on the post they called Fort Riley, after retired General Bennett C. Riley. Riley himself requested that the fort be named instead for Major John B. Clark, an officer of the 1st Infantry, who died during the Mexican–American War on August 23, 1847. It was accordingly renamed on July 15 of that year, and on July 30, 1852, the United States officially leased the land from Maverick, through signatory Lieutenant Colonel D.C. Tompkins, to permit development of a fort. After soldiers and officers quarters were constructed in 1853 and 1854, the fort was expanded with a hospital and a two-story storehouse in 1855. Stone quarters for the commanding officer, recorded as near completion in the summer of 1857, were converted to the post headquarters in 1873.

=== Brackettville ===
The nearby village of Las Moras was founded in 1852 by local dry-goods merchant Oscar B. Brackett. In the summer of 1854, Gen. Persifor F. Smith, the department commander, made a requisition to Governor Elisha M. Pease for six companies of Texas Rangers to conduct a campaign against the raiders. Two companies of these Texas military volunteers, under captains Charles E. Travis and William Henry, were sent to Fort Clark, where they assisted the regulars in patrolling the road. The town was renamed Brackett in his honor in 1856 and renamed Brackettville in 1873 upon receiving a government post office. It became a stop on the San Antonio-El Paso Road stagecoach. In 1876, a visitor to the town described it as "the liveliest burg in West Texas, where the night life could only be compared to the saloons and gambling places that existed in the early days of the gold excitement of California and the Klondike. Its flow of travellers later dried up when the railroad bypassed it by 10 miles.

== Civil War ==
On March 19, 1861, Captain Trevanion T. Teel, leader of 18 Confederate troops, accepted the surrender of the fort from then-Captain George Sykes, who was garrisoned there with four companies. The surrender took place without military engagement, but not without tension. The Union soldiers garrisoned at the base cut the halliard of the flag-pole after the Federal flag was removed to prevent the Confederate flag being raised. They then set fire to the barracks as they were withdrawing. Sykes took quick action to aid in extinguishing the fire to preserve the barracks and nearby buildings. In June 1861, after the outbreak of the Civil War, Fort Clark was garrisoned by companies C and H, Second Regiment of Texas Mounted Rifles, with Capt. H. A. Hamner as post commander. In August 1862, all Confederate troops were withdrawn from Fort Clark.

On December 12, 1866, U.S. troops from Company C of the Fourth Cavalry once again reoccupied the fort under the command of Capt. John E. Wilcox. Stone barracks, officer's quarters, and headquarters, plus a 200-ft-long wooden stable were added in 1868 after Companies C and F, 41st Infantry, and Companies G and M, 9th Cavalry were stationed at the fort.

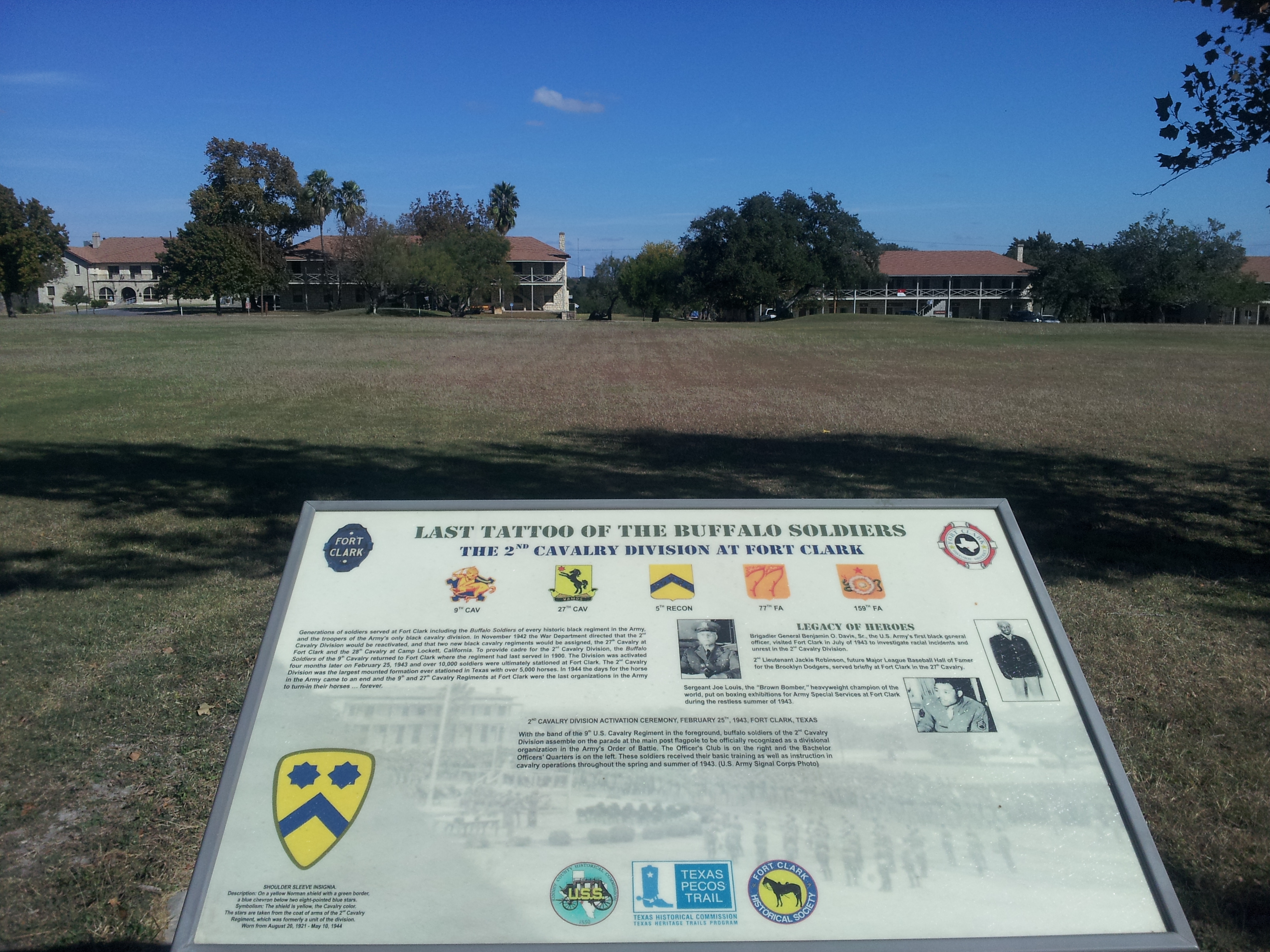
Historical marker about the Buffalo Soldiers, at Fort Clark

== Indian Wars ==
Other forts in the frontier fort system were Forts Griffin, Concho, Belknap, Chadbourne, Stockton, Davis, Bliss, McKavett, Richardson, McIntosh, Inge, and Phantom Hill in Texas, and Sill in Oklahoma. The system also had "subposts or intermediate stations", including Bothwick's Station on Salt Creek between Fort Richardson and Fort Belknap, Camp Wichita near Buffalo Springs between Fort Richardson and Red River Station, and Mountain Pass between Fort Concho and Fort Griffin.

The Seminole-Negro Indian Scouts were headquartered at Fort Clark from 1870 to 1914. The Black Seminoles had spent 20 years protecting the northern Mexican frontier state of Coahuila before being recruited by the United States Army to serve as scouts. Under Lt. John Lapham Bullis, who commanded them from 1873 to 1881, the scouts played a decisive role in the Indian campaigns. Among the roster of scouts are four who were awarded the Medal of Honor. A Seminole community settled near the fort in 1872, and its descendants are still to be found in Brackettville and the surrounding areas.

Colonel Ranald Mackenzie and the 4th US Cavalry were based here in 1873-1876 and 1878-1879.

On April 11, 1873, United States Secretary of War William W. Belknap and General Philip Sheridan ordered Mackenzie and his 4th Cavalry to relieve General Wesley Merritt and his 9th Cavalry, with Sheridan stating, "... I want something done to stop these conditions of banditry, killing... by these people across the river... you are to go ahead on your own plan of action, and your authority and backing shall be General Grant and myself...." This led, on 18 May, to Mackenzie's raid into Mexico with six companies and 20 Seminole-Negro scouts (nearly 400 men) to avenge the Indian raid up the Nueces River Valley and the massacre at Howard's Wells, attacking the Kickapoo, Lipan, Pottawottami, and Mescalero Apache lodges at Rey Molina. The lodges were burned, at least 19 warriors were killed, 40-50 prisoners were taken, including the Lipan Chief Costalites, and nearly 200 horses were captured.

Despite Mexico's protests that the United States was violating its sovereignty, other sorties by Mackenzie soon followed. As a result, Indian forays from Mexico into Texas declined dramatically. Mackenzie was succeeded by Lt. Col. William Rufus Shafter in 1876. Shafter followed Mackenzie as one of the most successful of Fort Clark's Indian-fighting commanding officers. Under Shafter, Fort Clark became the garrison for the 10th U.S. Cavalry and the 24th and 25th U.S. Infantry regiments. These were mounted regiments of black men, called "buffalo soldiers" by the Indians. The Buffalo Soldiers, for a long time mostly unacclaimed, left a distinguished record of service in ridding southwest Texas of Indians.

Mackenzie's raid in 1873 had stopped Indian activity for almost three years, but as the lesson of Rey Molina dimmed, violence once more came to the Rio Grande border area. In the fall of 1875, department commander Gen. Edward O. C. Ord established the District of the Nueces, with Fort Clark as headquarters and with Shafter in control. When, in April and May 1876, Lipan warriors killed 12 Texans in an unusually bloody raid, Ord authorized Shafter to go after the offenders in their Mexican villages. Shafter took five companies of cavalry, along with Bullis's scouts, and established a base camp near the mouth of the Pecos River.

In the first of a long succession of border violations, Shafter's cavalrymen splashed across the Rio Grande and drove deep into the mountains of northern Coahuila. For two years, Shafter's determined thrusts into Mexico in pursuit of the marauding Indians and their chief, Washa Lobo, aroused Mexican animosity and caused tensions between the U.S. and Mexican governments. Shafter's extensive campaign on the Texas borderlands frontier earned him the sobriquet "Pecos Bill", and he boldly implemented the Army's aggressive policy toward hostile Indians, which was one of removal or extermination. By the end of the decade, the Indian problem along the border had finally been brought under control.

In 1878, Mary Maverick doubled the rent for the 3,866 acres from $600 a year to $1200. In 1884, she sold the entire property to the U.S. for $80,000.

== World War II ==
In 1941, the 112th Cavalry Regiment (Horse) Texas National Guard under the command of Col. Julian Cunningham, was assigned to Fort Clark, where it trained until it was deployed for combat in the Pacific. Just before the 112th Cavalry left, the black 9th United States Cavalry arrived at Fort Clark from Fort Riley. Elements of the regiment had first served at Fort Clark in 1875, when the fort was a frontier outpost. In 1942, Col. William C. Chase and the 113th Cavalry Regiment spent a short stay guarding the Southern Pacific Railroad. On February 25, 1943, the 2nd Cavalry Division, the army's last horse-mounted unit, was activated under command of Maj. Gen. Harry H. Johnson. Units of the 2nd Cavalry Division stationed at Fort Clark included the 5th Cavalry Brigade (made up of the 9th and 27th US Cavalry Regiments). More than 12,000 troops were stationed there until their deployment in February 1944 to the European Theater of Operations. The war added another feature to the history of Fort Clark, that of having a German prisoner-of-war subcamp on the 4,000-acre reservation. Finally, in June 1944, nearly three years after the beginning of World War II, and after full mechanization of the cavalry, the government ordered the closure of Fort Clark, one of the last horse-cavalry posts in the country. The fort was officially inactivated in early 1946, and later that year it was sold to the Texas Railway Equipment Company of Houston, a subsidiary of Brown and Root Company, for salvage and later use as a "guest ranch".

== Closure ==
Cavalry training at the fort ceased in January, 1944. That year, the US Army deactivated the cavalry branch and merged it with the armor branch. The base was deactivated in 1946.

== Gallery ==
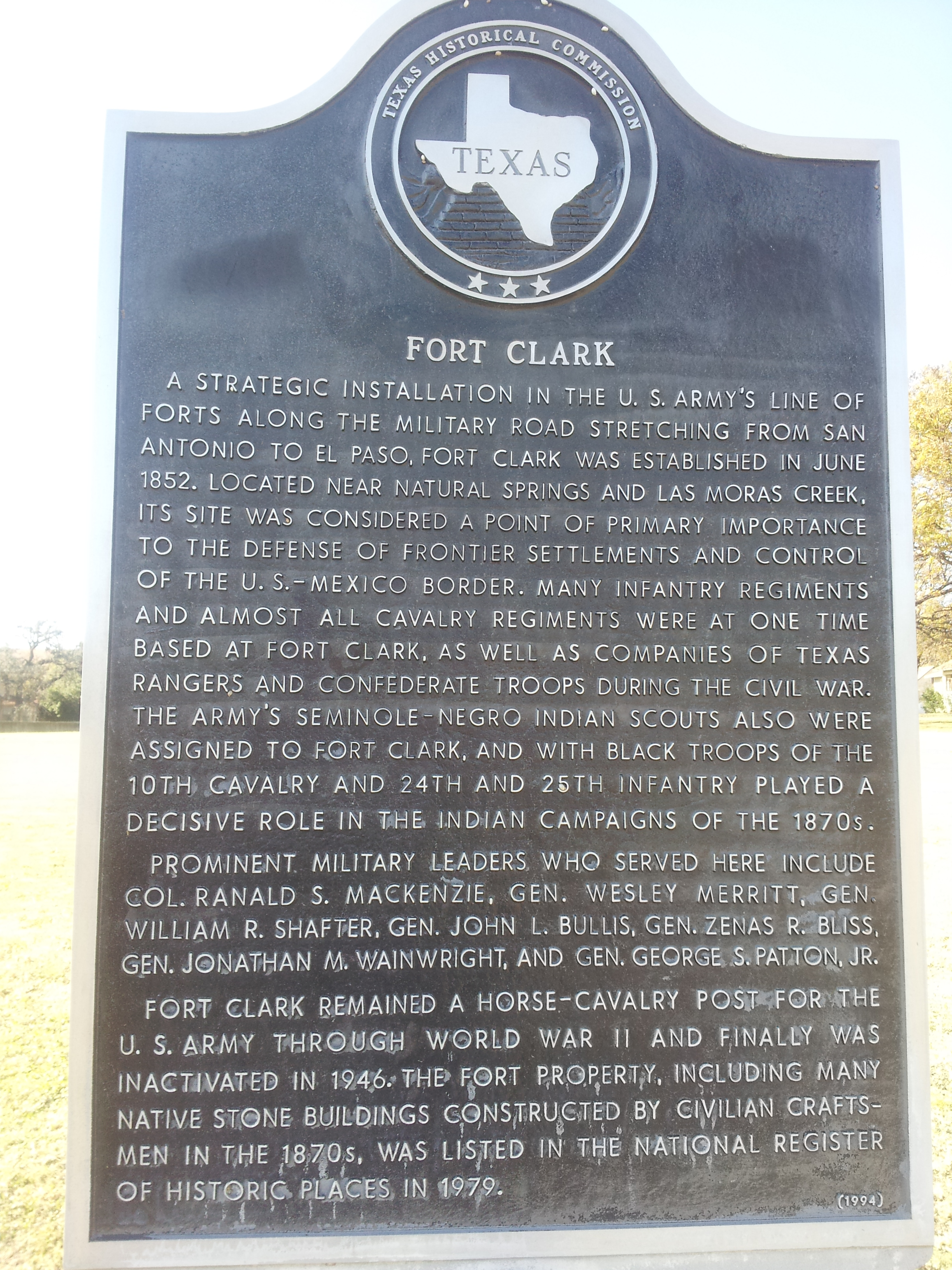
Historical marker

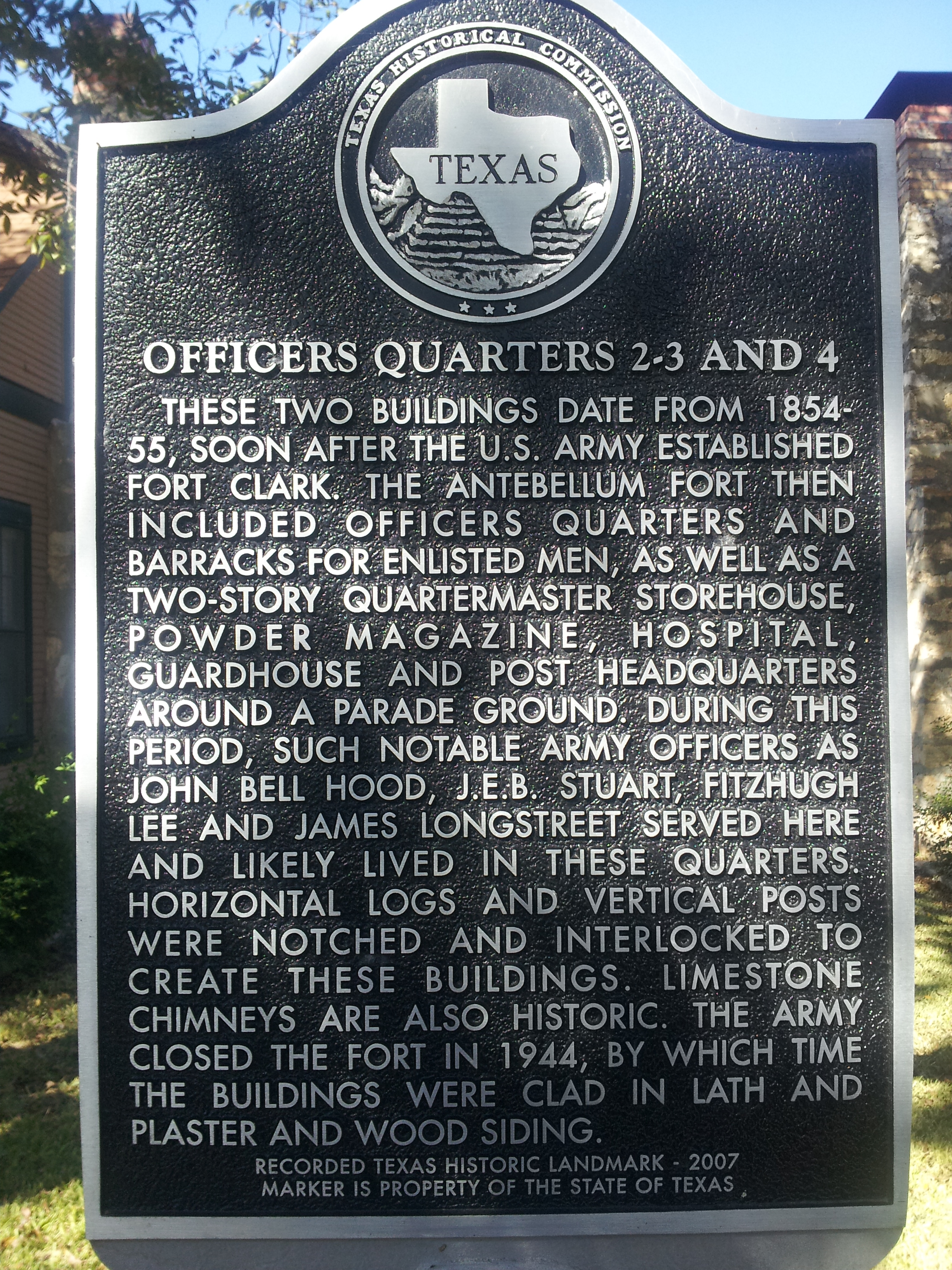
Officers' quarters historical marker

== See also ==
- National Register of Historic Places listings in Kinney County, Texas
- Recorded Texas Historic Landmarks in Kinney County
- Forts of Texas

== References and bibliography ==
- Haenn, Bill (September 15, 2002). Fort Clark and Brackettville: land of heroes. Arcadia Publishing. ISBN 978-0-7385-2063-6.
