= Sennett Bathing Beauties =

Bevy of American actresses

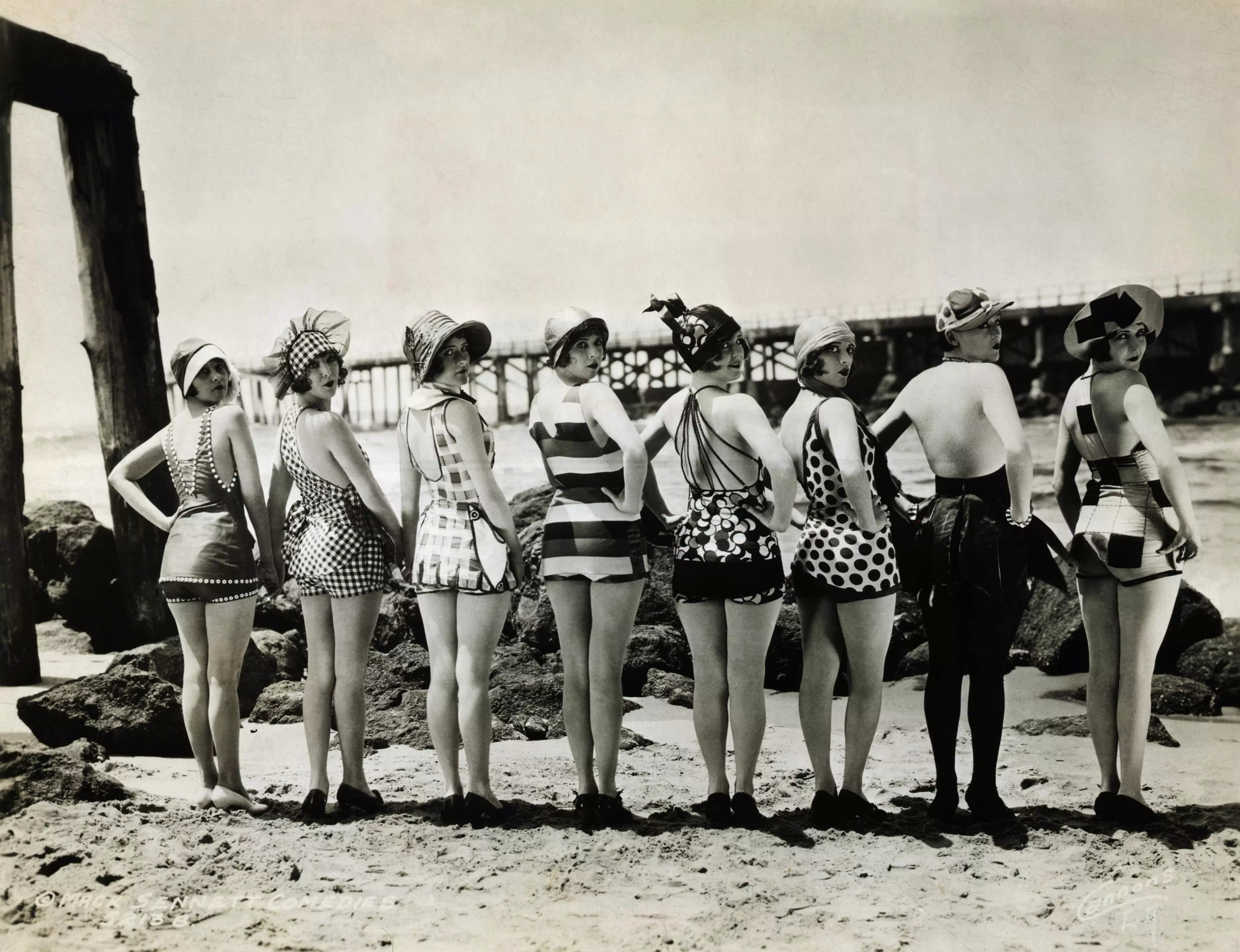
Sennett Bathing Beauties

Sennett Bathing Beauties is a term for an unofficial group of models assembled by film producer Mack Sennett during the silent film era. The group performed in bathing costumes between 1915 and 1928. Many went on to have notable careers.

== Description ==
The Sennett Bathing Beauties appeared in Mack Sennett comedy short subjects, in promotional material, and in promotional events such as Venice Beach beauty contests. Beginning in 1915, the original trio assembled by Sennett consisted of Evelyn Lynn, Cecile Evans, and Marie Prevost. Hundreds more would follow; many remained nameless.

Not individually featured or named, many of these young women ascended to significant careers of their own, including Juanita Hansen, Claire Anderson, Marie Prevost, Phyllis Haver, Myrtle Lind and Carole Lombard. Other notable Bathing Beauties include: Marion Aye, Alice Day, Polly Moran, Gonda Durand, Madeline Hurlock, Vera Reynolds, Mary Thurman, Thelma Hill, Thelma Parr, Marvel Rea, Harriet Hammond, Evelyn Francisco, Vera Steadman, Josephine Cogdell, Elinor Field, and Ora Carew.

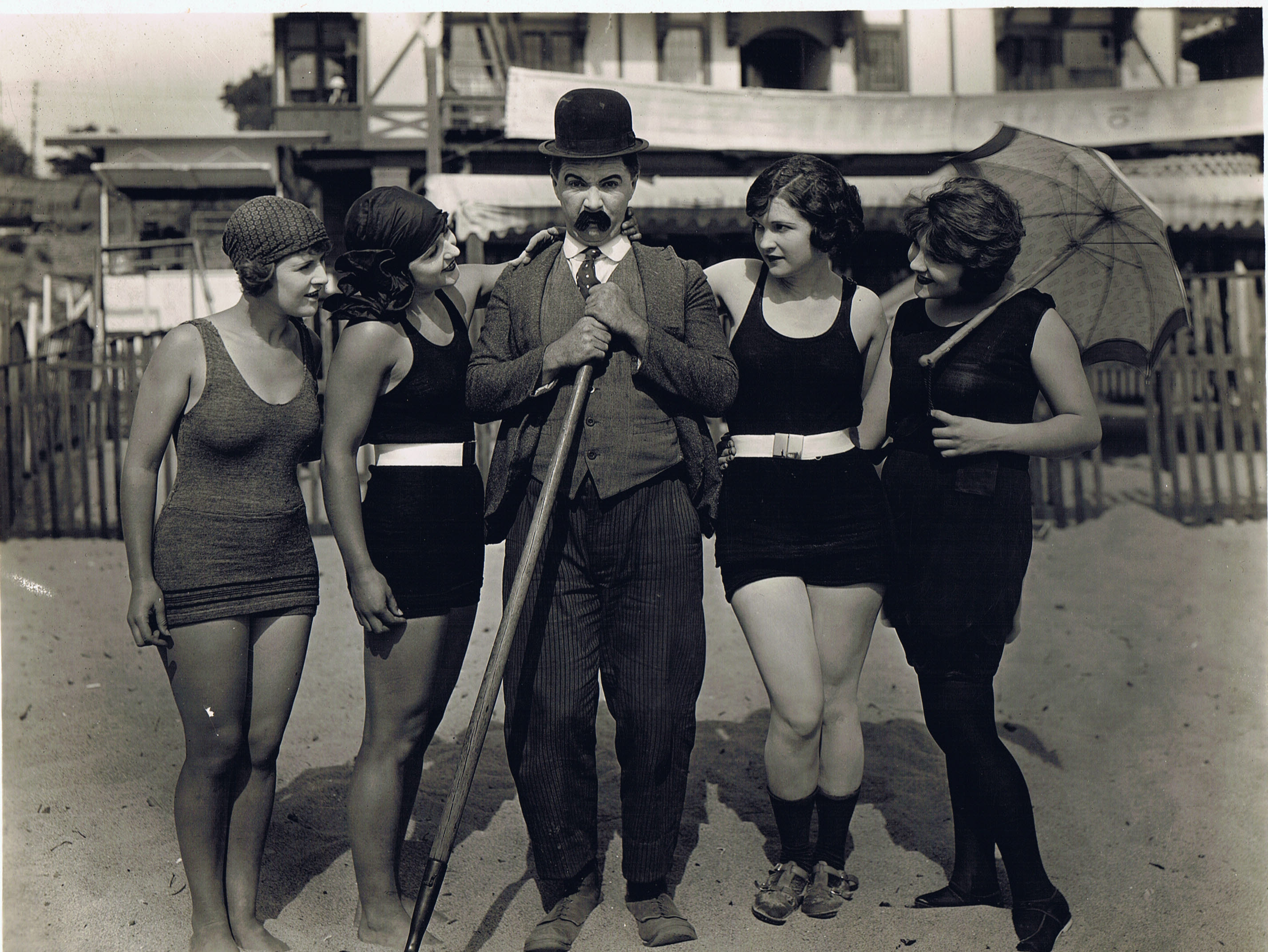
Actor Billy Bevan flanked by four bathing beauties, 1920s

Two of those often named as Bathing Beauties later distanced themselves from the appellation: Mabel Normand and Gloria Swanson. Normand was a featured player, and her 1912 8-minute film The Water Nymph may have been the direct inspiration for the Bathing Beauties. Although Gloria Swanson worked for Sennett in 1916 and was photographed in a bathing suit, she was also a star and "vehemently denied" being one of the bathing beauties.

Sennett explained his inspiration for the Bathing Beauties:

One morning as I went through the Times, in my tub, I noticed a three-column picture on Page One of a pretty girl who had been involved in a minor traffic accident. The picture made the front page for two obvious and attractive reasons. The young lady's knees were showing.

— Mack Sennett, King of Comedy

In the 1920s, Sennett's Bathing Beauties remained popular enough to provoke imitators such as the Christie Studios' Bathing Beauties (counting Raquel Torres and Laura La Plante as alumnae) and Fox Film Corporation's "Sunshine Girls" (counting Janet Gaynor as an alumna). The Sennett Bathing Beauties continued to appear through 1928. There was a brief revival in 1949, in connection with publicity for the Sennett comedy compilation film Down Memory Lane.
