= Brackett Independent School District =

School district in Texas, United States

Location
- 400 Ann St. Brackettville, Texas ESC Region 20 USA
- Coordinates: 29°19′2″N 100°24′45″W

District information
- Type: Independent school district
- Grades: Pre-K through 12
- Superintendent: Eliza Diaz
- Schools: 3
- NCES District ID: 4811070

Students and staff
- Students: 614 (2010-11)
- Teachers: 53.39 (2009-10) (on full-time equivalent (FTE) basis)
- Student–teacher ratio: 11.19(2009-10)
- Athletic conference: UIL Class 1A Football Division I
- District mascot: Tigers
- Colors: Black, Gold

Other information
- TEA District Accountability Rating for 2011-12: Recognized
- Website: www.brackettisd.net

Brackett Independent School District is a public school district based in Brackettville, Texas (USA). The district's boundaries parallel that of Kinney County. The district operates one high school, Brackett High School.

== Finances ==
As of the 2010-2011 school year, the appraised valuation of property in the district was $165,975,000. The maintenance tax rate was $0.104 and the bond tax rate was $0.000 per $100 of appraised valuation.

As of 2007, the Texas State Energy Conservation Office awards Brackett ISD money due to the colonias served by the district.

== Academic achievement ==
In 2011, the school district was rated "recognized" by the Texas Education Agency. Thirty-five percent of districts in Texas in 2011 received the same rating. No state accountability ratings will be given to districts in 2012. A school district in Texas can receive one of four possible rankings from the Texas Education Agency: Exemplary (the highest possible ranking), Recognized, Academically Acceptable, and Academically Unacceptable (the lowest possible ranking).

Historical district TEA accountability ratings

- 2011: Recognized
- 2010: Recognized
- 2009: Recognized
- 2008: Academically Acceptable
- 2007: Academically Acceptable
- 2006: Academically Acceptable
- 2005: Academically Acceptable
- 2004: Recognized

== Schools ==
In the 2011-2012 school year, the district operated three schools.

- Brackett High School (Grades 9-12)
- Brackett Junior High School (Grades 6-8)
- Jones Elementary/Intermediate School (Grades PK-5)

== Special programs ==
=== Athletics ===
Brackett High School participates in the boys sports of baseball, basketball, football, golf, track, cross country, and tennis. The school participates in the girls sports of basketball, softball, volleyball, track, cross country, tennis, and golf. For the 2012 through 2014 school years, Brackett High School will play football in UIL Class 1A Division I. The name of the school mascot is Rajah The Tiger.

== See also ==
- List of school districts in Texas
- List of high schools in Texas
