= Texas State Highway 131 =

State highway in Texas

State Highway 131
- SH 131, highlighted in red

Route information
- Maintained by TxDOT
- Length: 33.092 mi (53.256 km)
- Existed: by 1928–present

Major junctions
- South end: US 277 near Eagle Pass
- North end: US 90 in Brackettville

Location
- Country: United States
- State: Texas
- Counties: Maverick, Kinney

Highway system
- Highways in Texas; Interstate; US; State; Former; Toll; Loops; Spurs; FM/RM; Park; Rec
← SH 130 Toll	→ SH 132

State Highway 131 (SH 131) is a Texas state highway that runs from US 277 near Eagle Pass to US 90 in Brackettville.

== Route description ==
SH 131 begins at US 277, 12 miles north of Eagle Pass near Maverick County Memorial International Airport. The route travels roughly to the north-northeast through unincorporated sections of Maverick and Kinney counties; the only incorporated community between the route's termini is the city of Spofford. The highway ends in Brackettville at a junction with US 90.

== History ==
SH 131 was originally designated on January 18, 1928 from Brackettville to Spofford. The extension south was added on January 18, 1935. On July 15, 1935, the extension south of Spofford was cancelled. The extension south of Spofford was restored on November 24, 1936.

== Major intersections ==
County	Location	mi	km	Destinations	Notes
Maverick		0.0	0.0	US 277 – Eagle Pass, Del Rio	Southern terminus
Kinney		21.7	34.9	FM 1908	
Kinney	Spofford	23.8	38.3	FM 1572	
Kinney	Brackettville	33.1	53.3	US 90 – Del Rio, Uvalde	Northern terminus
1.000 mi = 1.609 km; 1.000 km = 0.621 mi
