= Della Pringle =

American actress

Della Pringle, the stage name for Cora Della Van Winkle (August 20, 1870 – November 9, 1952) was a repertory theater actress who achieved popularity in the American West and Midwest between 1888 and 1921. She also had a brief career in silent films as a member of Mack Sennett's Keystone Kops organization.

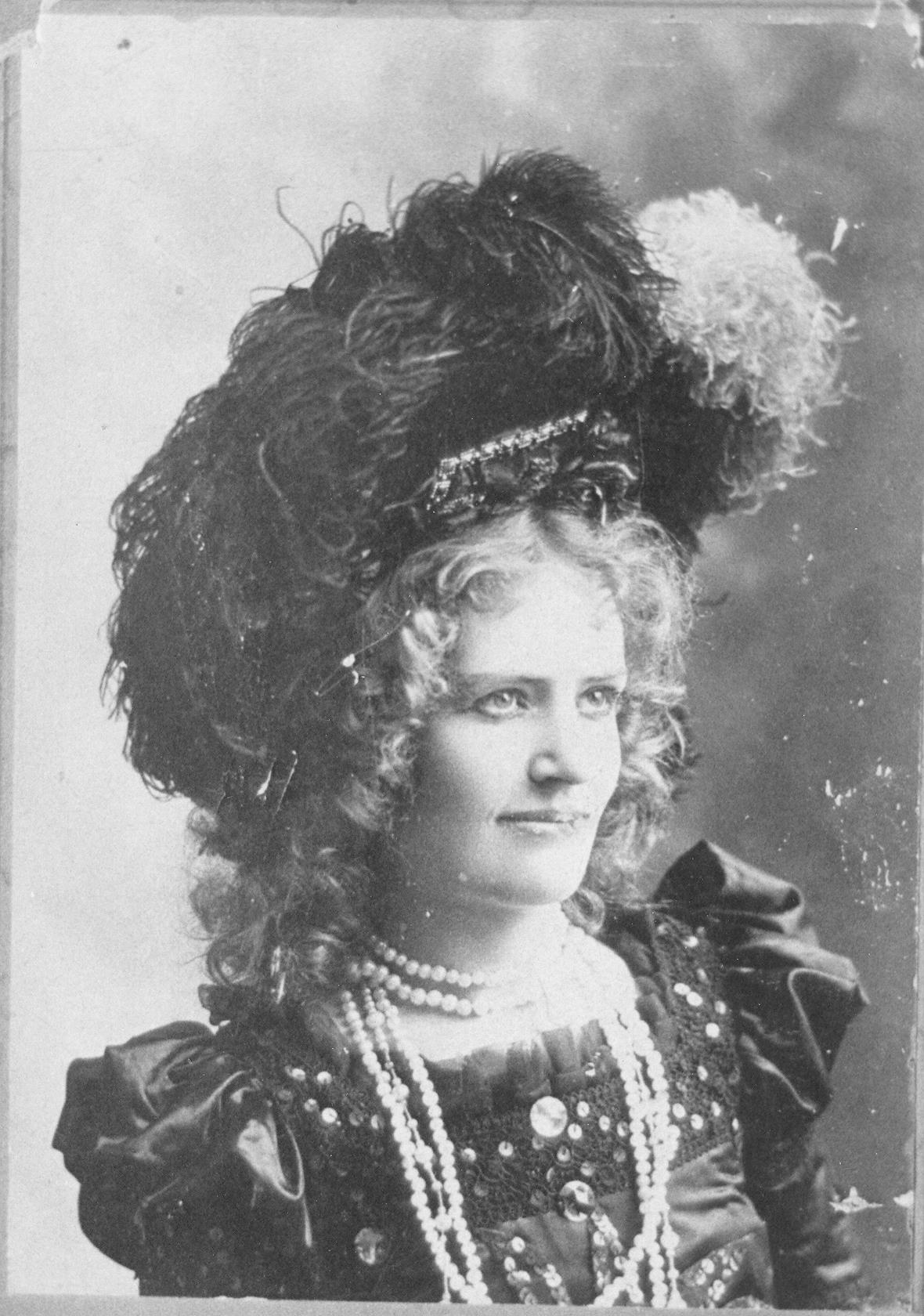
Portrait of actress Della Pringle taken about 1892

== Early career ==
Born Cora Della Van Winkle in Trenton, Missouri, she began her professional career at age one playing juvenile roles for the Robert Neff Chicago Comedly Company. She acquired the stage name of "Della Pringle" when she married Johnny Pringle in 1891.

Pringle grew up in Knoxville, Iowa. As a teenager, she worked as a hotel maid.

== Accomplishments ==
Pringle became a star attraction in the western half of the United States during the late 19th century, amassing a fortune in the traveling repertory theater business and claim to be "the actress who made Iowa famous." Billboard stated while not a national celebrity, Pringle's name was a household word in those areas.

Newspaper accounts said that Pringle never appeared in a Broadway product, never claimed to be a great actress, and stated that he had no acting training. However, they notes her natural talents in acting, singing and dancing, her well formed figure, her long golden hair, her well featured face and her witty, vibrant personality made her a star in the small towns, mining camps, logging camps, military outposts and cow towns of the West.

Pringle earned critical acclaim when she appeared in cities like Denver, Salt Lake City, Des Moines and Los Angeles. On Pringle's only tour through the American Northeast and New England, the press found her to be the equal of any eastern repertory actress.

== Tours ==
On occasion, Pringle operated resident theater stock companies in some towns.. However, she toured for most of her career, appearing in 32 states. Her performances included shows high in the Rocky Mountains of Colorado to one inside an Arizona gold mine.

Pringle had her own Pullman car for these tours. While touring, she escaped death three times in railroad and stage coach accidents as well as theater fires. Pringle toured year round.

== Acquaintances ==
Pringle worked for two years in the California film industry and appeared in nine silent films. She was friends with Charlie Chaplin, Fatty Arbuckle, Douglas Fairbanks, Ben Turpin and Gloria Swanson. She acted for Mack Sennett in his Keystone Kops films She knew Buffalo Bill Cody and Annie Oakley and visited with Cody on several occasions up through 1915.

Through her marriage to John Pringle, she became a virtual stepmother to actor John Gilbert. Her correspondence and pictures appeared frequently in the theatrical trade papers.

== Actress/Manager ==
Pringle was one of the few women in her era who produced and directed her own shows. She also pursued farming, real estate investing, rooming house management, millinery, running a costume rental business, drama education and Boston bulldog breeding.

== Wardrobe ==
Pringle possessed one of the best wardrobes of any leading actress on the western stage. Early in her career she used her sewing skills to create her own costumes, but by 1898 she made a practice to purchase imported Parisian fashions from major clothiers in New York and Chicago. For one season alone Pringe spent thousands of dollars on Paris gowns. She saw to it that her supporting actresses also had impressive wardrobes.

== Marriages ==
Pringle married at five times:

- John G. Pringle (1864–1929) – married July 1, 1891, Appanoose County, Iowa; Della divorced him in 1894 on grounds of adultery and other causes
- George Faith Adams – married February 6, 1894, Nashua, Iowa; Della filed for divorce August 5, 1904
- Thomas O. Tuttle (born 1874) – married December 31, 1904, Chariton, Iowa; divorce filed around 1906
- Cecil (C.K.) Van Auker (1885–1938) – married June 14, 1908, Ogden, Utah; Della filed for divorce March 13, 1918
- Edward Harold Hopper (1879–1930) – married January 17, 1920, Boise, Idaho; Della filed for divorce for the second time August 18, 1931, on grounds of desertion

== Retirement ==
After leaving show business in 1921, Pringle retired to Boise, Idaho, her residence since 1908 and where she founded her costume rental business. In the late 1930s. she served as a drama instructor for the Public Works Administration.

Pringle lost her fortune during the Great Depression. Old age and illness eventually forced her to move to the Boise poorhouse. She died there in November 1952.
