= Kinney County, Texas =

County in Texas, United States

- County
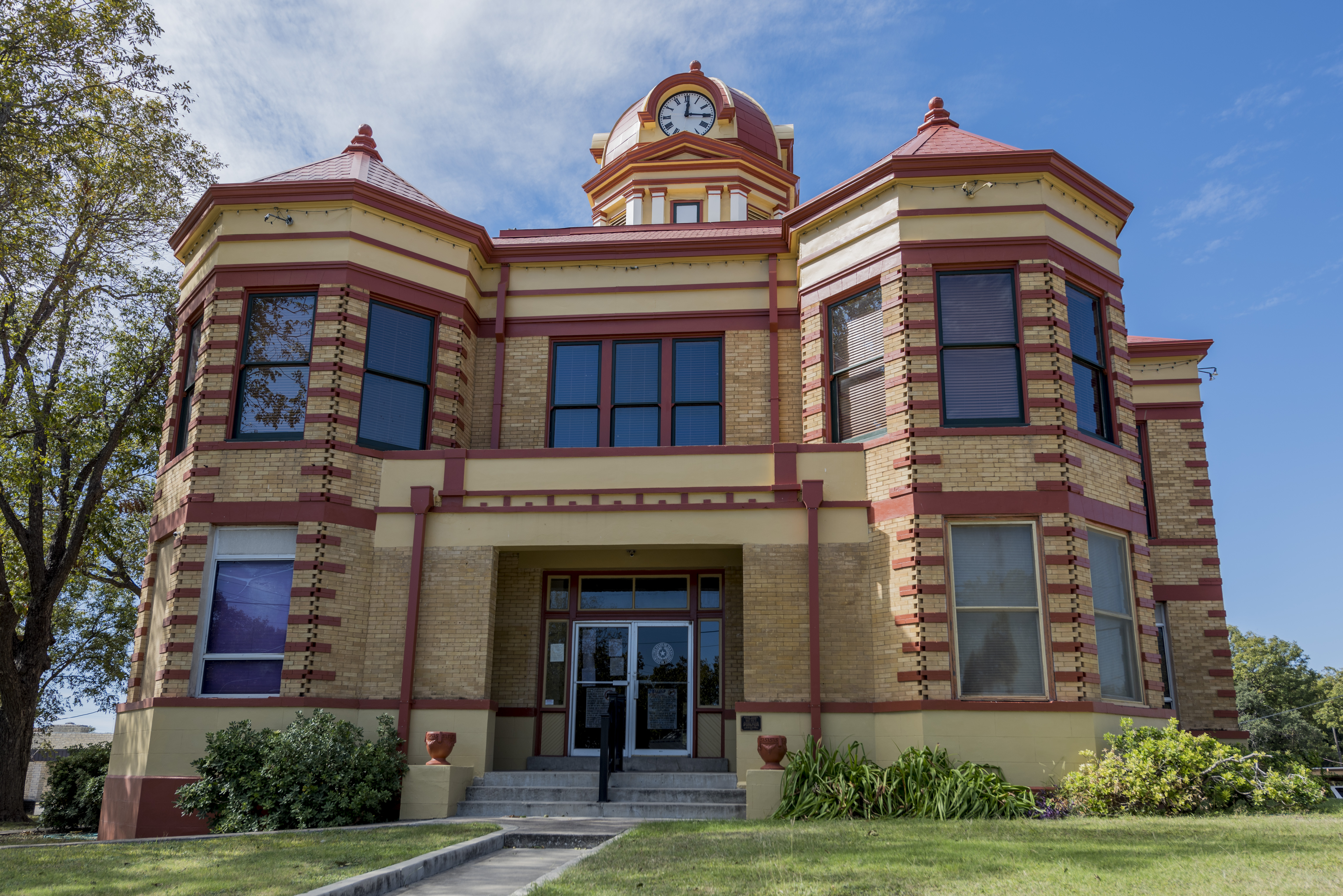
- The Kinney County Courthouse was built in 1910 and is an example of Beaux Arts Classicism architecture. It was added to the National Register of Historic Places in 2004.

- Location within the U.S. state of Texas
- Coordinates: 29°21′N 100°25′W
- Country: United States
- State: Texas
- Founded: 1874
- Named for: Henry Lawrence Kinney
- Seat: Brackettville
- Largest city: Brackettville

Area
  - Total: 1,365 sq mi (3,540 km^{2})
  - Land: 1,360 sq mi (3,500 km^{2})
  - Water: 5.1 sq mi (13 km^{2}) 0.4%

Population (2020)
  - Total: 3,129
  - Estimate (2025): 3,128 ▼
  - Density: 2.6/sq mi (1.0/km^{2})
- Time zone: UTC−6 (Central)
  - Summer (DST): UTC−5 (CDT)
- Congressional district: 23rd
- Website: www.co.kinney.tx.us

Kinney County is a county located in the U.S. state of Texas. As of the 2020 census, its population was 3,129. Its county seat is Brackettville. The county was created in 1850 and later organized in 1874. It is named for Henry Lawrence Kinney, an early settler.

Kinney County's self-proclaimed biggest issue since the 2010s is undocumented immigration from Mexico through the county. The county claims it does not have the resources to deal with the large number of migrants, and in 2021 proclaimed a state of emergency.

== History ==
=== Native Americans ===
The first inhabitants were 6,000–10,000 years ago and later came to include Lipan Apache, Mescalero Apache, Coahuiltecan, Jumanos, Tamaulipans, Tonkawa, and Comanches. These tribes settled in rock shelters in the river and creek valleys, leaving behind artifacts and caches of seeds, implements, burial sites, and petroglyphs.

Most of the Indians that raided the county after the civil war were the Kickapoo, Seminole, and Lipan Apache. These Indians sometimes worked with Mexicans to raid the area.

The last Native American raid in the county was likely in April of 1881 when Lipan Apaches were attacked by U.S soldiers after the raid on the Frio Canyon in Real County.

=== Early explorations ===
Saltillo Alcalde Fernando de Azcué passed through the southeast corner of the county in 1665 on an expedition, becoming the first European to cross the Rio Grande. Franciscan Brother Manuel de la Cruz explored the county in 1674. In 1675, Fernando del Bosque traversed the area on an expedition up the Rio Grande from the city of Nuestra Sra. de Guadalupe. He was accompanied by Franciscan friars Juan Larios and Dionisio de San Buenaventura. Alonso De León in 1688 discovered French explorer and La Salle expedition deserter Jean Henri in a somewhat confused state of mind, among the Coahuiltecan Indians near the site of present Brackettville, generally believed to be at Anacacho Mountain. During the late 18th century, several Franciscans established a settlement on Las Moras Creek near the center of the county. In 1834, while the area was still under Mexican control, English land speculators John Charles Beales and James Grant attempted to establish an English-speaking colony called Dolores at the site. Streets were laid off and 59 colonists were brought in, but the project was abandoned.

=== County established ===
The state legislature formed Kinney County from Bexar County in 1850, five years after Texas statehood, and named it for Henry Lawrence Kinney. The United States Army established Fort Clark in June 1852 on Las Moras Creek, and named it after John B. Clark, who had died in the Mexican War. Brackettville was founded in 1852 originally as the town of Brackett and named for Oscar B. Brackett, who came to set up a stage stop and opened the town's first dry-goods store. Brackett became a stop on a stage line from San Antonio to El Paso, but the settlement grew very slowly because of continuous Indian attacks. The town received its first post office in 1875. On February 18, 1861, on orders from United States Army General David E. Twiggs, Fort Clark was surrendered to the Texas Commission. Twiggs was dismissed by the United States for the act, and subsequently joined the Confederacy. The fort was evacuated by federal troops on March 19 and occupied by Confederate troops under the command of Confederate Colonel John R. Baylor. It remained in the hands of the Confederates until the end of the war, but was not garrisoned. In December 1866, it was reestablished as a federal fort.

=== Black Seminoles ===
In early 1872, a number of Black Seminoles living along the border were organized into a company of scouts and brought to Fort Clark. Others joined them, and by the mid-1870s, they numbered some 400 to 500. For the next quarter century, they lived on a reservation along Las Moras Creek. In 1914, the Black Seminoles were removed from the Fort Clark reservation, but some of their descendants still live in the county. The Seminole Indian Scouts cemetery was founded on Fort Clark in 1872.

=== County organization and growth ===
The county was organized in 1874. County government followed in 1875. In 1876, Brackettville was designated county seat after the final boundaries of the county were set by the legislature. In 1870, the county had 14,846 cattle, and large numbers of cattle were driven north during the great drives of the mid-1870s. By 1880, sheep outnumbered cattle 55,597 to 7,966, and Kinney County became an important source of wool. The construction of the Galveston, Harrisburg and San Antonio Railway (later part of the Southern Pacific Railroad, and today part of the Union Pacific Railroad) through Spofford in 1883 gave the wool and mohair industry access to markets. At the same time, it also helped to bring in numerous new settlers. In 1925, a branch line of the Texas and New Orleans Railroad was built from near Spofford to connect with the Mexican National Railroad at the Rio Grande. A large Civilian Conservation Corps camp constructed adjacent to Fort Clark helped to employ some people during the Great Depression. With the onset of World War II, wool and mohair were in demand for the defense industries. Fort Clark was closed in 1946.

James T. “Happy” Shahan constructed Alamo Village on his ranch near Brackettville during the late 1950s, for filming of the 1960 John Wayne epic The Alamo. Preserved as a tourist attraction, Alamo Village continued to serve as a set for hundreds of movies and documentaries. In 1969, Happy Shahan hired 18-year-old Johnny Rodriguez to sing at Alamo Village, an opportunity that rocketed Rodriguez to stardom. Kickapoo Cavern State Park, 6,400 acres (26 km^{2}) in both Edwards and Kinney Counties, opened to the public in 1991. It was formerly a private ranch. The Kinney County Groundwater Conservation District was approved by the voters in 2002.

=== Undocumented migrants ===
Kinney County's southwest border is for 13 miles (21 km) the Rio Grande and the border of Mexico. It is on the route for undocumented border crossers heading for San Antonio, the closest city. According to the Kinney County official Web page, "Our county is being bombarded by hundreds of illegal aliens on a daily basis. Our local law enforcement is overwhelmed with illegal alien smuggling activity". In April 2021, Kinney County Sheriff Brad Coe, County Judge Tully Shahan, and Kinney County Attorney Brent Smith jointly issued a declaration of a state of disaster in the county. The State of Texas, under Governor Greg Abbott, has been moving state police and the Texas State Guard into Kinney and adjacent Val Verde County. As they cannot enforce federal immigration laws, they arrest migrants for trespassing on private property (ranches).

Kinney County has a reputation for its aggressive enforcement of trespassing laws. A New York Times investigation found that the county arrested hundreds of migrants, collected bail from the migrants, and kept the money after the migrants were deported. The county stood out for keeping the bail money; other counties typically return bail money to migrants who were deported. Over a four-year period, the county collected $1.7 million, which is equivalent to funding the sheriff's department for a year.

== Geography ==
According to the U.S. Census Bureau, the county has a total area of 1,365 sq mi (3,540 km^{2}), of which 5.1 square miles (13 km^{2}) (0.4%) are covered by water. The county is separated from Mexico by the Rio Grande, and drained by numerous small tributaries of that river.

=== Major highways ===
- U.S. Highway 90
- U.S. Highway 277
- State Highway 131
- Loop 166

=== Adjacent counties and municipalities ===
- Edwards County (north)
- Uvalde County (east)
- Maverick County (south)
- Val Verde County (west)
- Jiménez, Coahuila, Mexico (south)

== Demographics ==
Historical population
Census	Pop.	Note	%±
1860	61		—
1870	1,204		1,873.8%
1880	4,487		272.7%
1890	3,781		−15.7%
1900	2,447		−35.3%
1910	3,401		39.0%
1920	3,746		10.1%
1930	3,980		6.2%
1940	4,533		13.9%
1950	2,668		−41.1%
1960	2,452		−8.1%
1970	2,006		−18.2%
1980	2,279		13.6%
1990	3,119		36.9%
2000	3,379		8.3%
2010	3,598		6.5%
2020	3,129		−13.0%
2025 (est.)	3,128	▼	0.0%
U.S. Decennial Census; 1850–2010 2010–2014

=== 2020 census ===
As of the 2020 census, the county had a population of 3,129, 1,156 households, and 782 families. The median age was 46.1 years; 17.7% of residents were under 18 and 26.3% were 65 or older. For every 100 females, there were 125.8 males, and for every 100 females 18 and over, there were 127.8 males 18 and over.

The racial makeup of the county was 64.3% White, 1.5% Black or African American, 1.1% American Indian and Alaska Native, 0.3% Asian, 0.1% Native Hawaiian and Pacific Islander, 8.8% from some other race, and 24.0% from two or more races. Hispanic or Latino residents of any race comprised 47.0% of the population.

Almost all of the residents lived in rural areas, while 0.1% lived in urban areas.

Of the 1,156 households in the county, 25.0% had children under 18 living in them, 50.0% were married-couple households, 20.0% were households with a male householder and no spouse or partner present, and 27.8% were households with a female householder and no spouse or partner present. About 32.1% of all households were made up of individuals, and 19.5% had someone living alone who was 65 or older.

The county had 1,521 housing units, of which 24.0% were vacant. Among occupied housing units, 81.7% were owner-occupied and 18.3% were renter-occupied. The homeowner vacancy rate was 4.6% and the rental vacancy rate was 12.4%.

=== Racial and ethnic composition ===
Kinney County, Texas – Racial and ethnic composition Note: the US Census treats Hispanic/Latino as an ethnic category. This table excludes Latinos from the racial categories and assigns them to a separate category. Hispanics/Latinos may be of any race.
Race / Ethnicity (NH = Non-Hispanic)	Pop 1980	Pop 1990	Pop 2000	Pop 2010	Pop 2020	% 1980	% 1990	% 2000	% 2010	% 2020
White alone (NH)	876	1,463	1,587	1,496	1,489	38.44%	46.91%	46.97%	41.58%	47.59%
Black or African American alone (NH)	81	48	44	39	36	3.55%	1.54%	1.30%	1.08%	1.15%
Native American or Alaska Native alone (NH)	9	22	5	19	21	0.39%	0.71%	0.15%	0.53%	0.67%
Asian alone (NH)	3	7	4	10	10	0.13%	0.22%	0.12%	0.28%	0.32%
Native Hawaiian or Pacific Islander alone (NH)	x	x	0	0	2	x	x	0.00%	0.00%	0.06%
Other race alone (NH)	0	9	0	6	15	0.00%	0.29%	0.00%	0.17%	0.48%
Mixed race or Multiracial (NH)	x	x	32	24	86	x	x	0.95%	0.67%	2.75%
Hispanic or Latino (any race)	1,310	1,570	1,707	2,004	1,470	57.48%	50.34%	50.52%	55.70%	46.98%
Total	2,279	3,119	3,379	3,598	3,129	100.00%	100.00%	100.00%	100.00%	100.00%

=== 2000 census ===
As of the 2000 census, 3,379 people, 1,314 households, and 940 families resided in the county. The population density was 2 people per square mile (0.77 people/km^{2}). The 1,907 housing units averaged 2 units per square mile (0.77/km^{2}). The racial makeup of the county was 75.8% White, 1.7% African American, 0.3% Native American, 0.1% Asian, 18.6% from other races, and 3.4% from two or more races. About 50.5% of the population was Hispanic or Latino of any race.

Of the 1,314 households, 27.2% had children under 18 living with them, 61.8% were married couples living together, 6.4% had a female householder with no husband present, and 28.4% were not families. About 26.6% of all households were made up of individuals, and 16.4% had someone living alone who was 65 or older. The average household size was 2.55, and the average family size was 3.10.

In the county, the age distribution was 25.7% under 18, 5.3% from 18 to 24, 21.5% from 25 to 44, 23.1% from 45 to 64, and 24.3% who were 65 or older. The median age was 43 years. For every 100 females, there were 99.8 males. For every 100 females 18 and over, there were 99.0 males.

The median income in the county for a household was $28,320 and for a family was $32,045. Males had a median income of $26,422 versus $16,250 for females. The per capita income for the county was $15,350. About 19.2% of families and 24.0% of the population were below the poverty line, including 33.0% of those under 18 and 16.1% of those 65 or over.

== Communities ==
=== Cities ===
- Brackettville (county seat)
- Spofford

=== Census-designated place ===
- Fort Clark Springs

== Politics ==
United States presidential election results for Kinney County, Texas
Year	Republican		Democratic		Third party(ies)	
Year	No.	%	No.	%	No.	%
1912	97	34.77%	76	27.24%	106	37.99%
1916	201	45.48%	233	52.71%	8	1.81%
1920	137	55.47%	98	39.68%	12	4.86%
1924	158	50.16%	144	45.71%	13	4.13%
1928	182	47.64%	200	52.36%	0	0.00%
1932	89	11.59%	678	88.28%	1	0.13%
1936	175	32.89%	357	67.11%	0	0.00%
1940	156	27.04%	418	72.44%	3	0.52%
1944	200	33.22%	401	66.61%	1	0.17%
1948	175	30.43%	370	64.35%	30	5.22%
1952	384	55.65%	306	44.35%	0	0.00%
1956	368	55.76%	289	43.79%	3	0.45%
1960	211	37.08%	358	62.92%	0	0.00%
1964	155	26.09%	439	73.91%	0	0.00%
1968	198	33.06%	333	55.59%	68	11.35%
1972	425	64.39%	234	35.45%	1	0.15%
1976	318	37.72%	516	61.21%	9	1.07%
1980	543	51.91%	472	45.12%	31	2.96%
1984	774	61.28%	486	38.48%	3	0.24%
1988	771	53.17%	669	46.14%	10	0.69%
1992	634	41.20%	598	38.86%	307	19.95%
1996	650	51.75%	503	40.05%	103	8.20%
2000	932	64.54%	486	33.66%	26	1.80%
2004	1,051	65.69%	542	33.88%	7	0.44%
2008	907	58.48%	633	40.81%	11	0.71%
2012	880	61.75%	522	36.63%	23	1.61%
2016	936	65.45%	458	32.03%	36	2.52%
2020	1,144	71.32%	446	27.81%	14	0.87%
2024	1,063	74.91%	346	24.38%	10	0.70%

United States Senate election results for Kinney County, Texas1
Year	Republican		Democratic		Third party(ies)	
Year	No.	%	No.	%	No.	%
2024	970	69.94%	390	28.12%	27	1.95%

United States Senate election results for Kinney County, Texas2
Year	Republican		Democratic		Third party(ies)	
Year	No.	%	No.	%	No.	%
2020	1,070	70.95%	395	26.19%	43	2.85%

Texas Gubernatorial election results for Kinney County
Year	Republican		Democratic		Third party(ies)	
Year	No.	%	No.	%	No.	%
2022	907	75.96%	258	21.61%	29	2.43%

== Education ==
All of Kinney County is in the Brackett Independent School District.

The designated community college is Southwest Texas Junior College.

== See also ==
- Brooks County, Texas
- List of museums in South Texas
- Missing in Brooks County
- National Register of Historic Places listings in Kinney County, Texas
- Recorded Texas Historic Landmarks in Kinney County
- Maverick County, Texas#Further reading
