= Brackettville, Texas =

- City
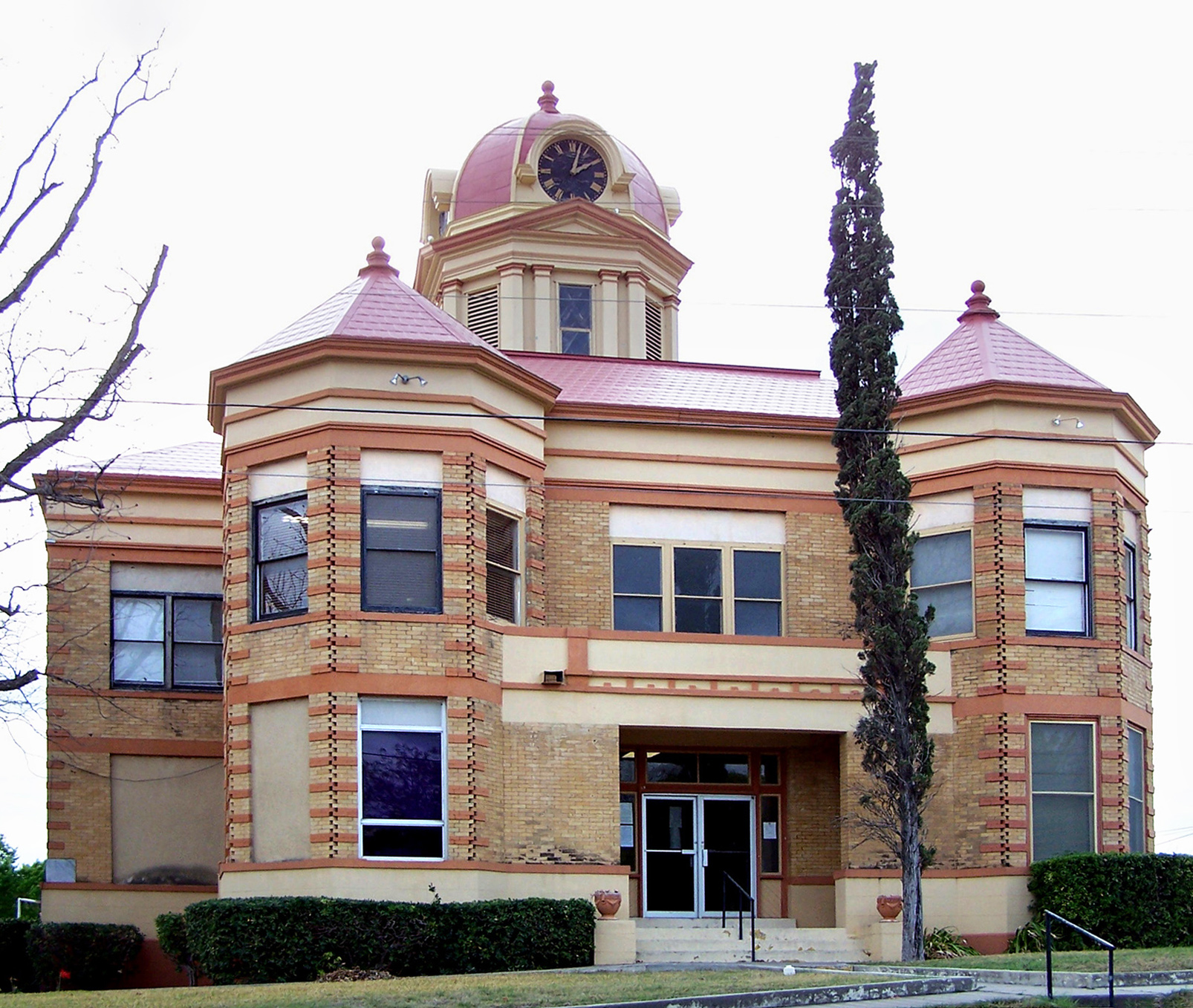
- Kinney County courthouse
- Interactive map of Brackettville, Texas
- Coordinates: 29°18′55″N 100°24′54″W
- Country: United States
- State: Texas
- County: Kinney

Area
  - Total: 3.17 sq mi (8.21 km^{2})
  - Land: 3.17 sq mi (8.21 km^{2})
  - Water: 0 sq mi (0.00 km^{2})
- Elevation: 1,106 ft (337 m)

Population (2020)
  - Total: 1,341
  - Density: 423.2/sq mi (163.38/km^{2})
- Time zone: UTC-6 (Central (CST))
  - Summer (DST): UTC-5 (CDT)
- ZIP code: 78832
- Area code: 830
- FIPS code: 48-09868
- GNIS feature ID: 1352804
- Website: www.brackettvilletx.gov

Brackettville is a city in Kinney County, Texas, United States. Its population was 1,341 at the 2020 census, down from 1,688 at the 2010 census. It is the county seat of Kinney County.

== History ==
Founded in 1852 as "Las Moras" (the name of a nearby spring and the creek it feeds), the town initially was a supply stop on the old San Antonio-El Paso Road and a supply depot for the U.S. Army's Fort Clark (the fort was established the same year). Later, the town was named "Brackett" after Oscar B. Brackett, the owner of the first dry-goods store in the area. In 1873, when a post office was awarded, "ville" was appended to the name to differentiate it from another town.

The town grew quickly through the 19th century with the expansion of the garrison at Fort Clark for the Indian Wars. The town's fortunes were tied to the fort. For many years, it was the base of the famous Buffalo Soldiers, made up of African Americans. Demographically, Brackettville had a larger proportion of Black Seminoles (African American escaped slaves who had lived alongside Seminole Native Americans prior to the 2nd Seminole War 1835–1842). During the slavery years, they had been living in a settlement in northern Mexico to escape US conditions. The language they developed in Florida, Afro-Seminole, is still spoken by some in Brackettville.

After the Buffalo Soldiers moved out of Fort Clark with the waning of the Indian Wars, it was used as a cavalry post. The Seminole Negro Indian Scouts were finally disbanded as a unit in 1914. Virtually every cavalry unit in the U.S. Army was stationed at or trained at Fort Clark at one time or another.

In 1943 during World War II, the U.S. Army activated the Second Cavalry Division, which was to be the Army's last horse-mounted unit. By 1944, even the Second had been mechanized. Fort Clark, so long a center of mounted cavalry, was targeted for closure, but before its closure, it was used as a German prisoner-of-war camp.

After the fort officially closed in 1946, it had a variety of uses. In 1971, it was converted and adapted as a resort/retirement center. The historic district of the fort is listed on the National Register of Historic Places. The resort is not the economic engine the fort once was, and Brackettville has shrunk from its peak population during the war years.

== Cultural matters ==
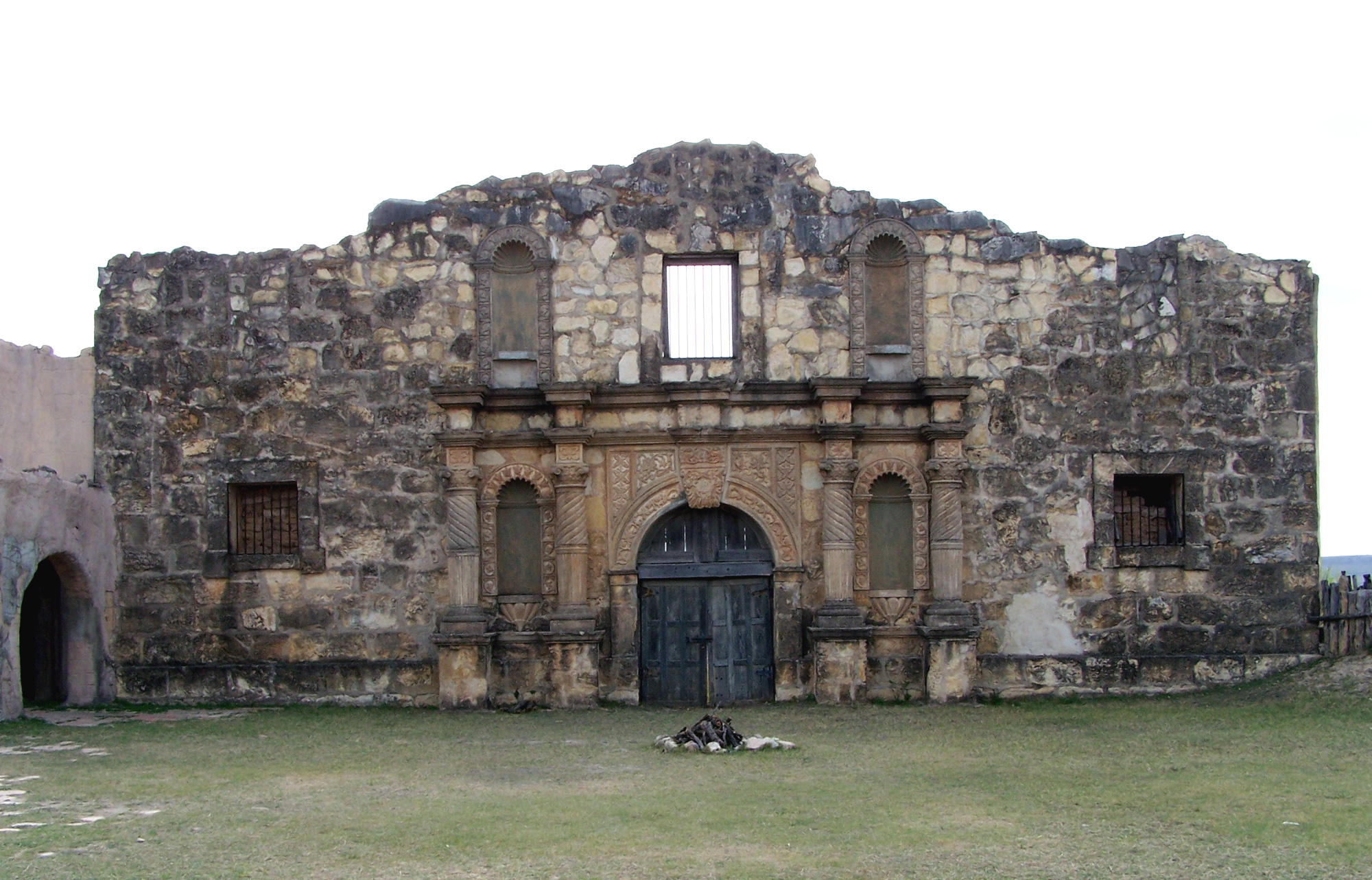
The replica of the Alamo used in the film The Alamo starring John Wayne

North of town is a tourist attraction called Alamo Village, built in 1959 as the set of John Wayne's movie The Alamo. Scenes from the 1969 comedy Viva Max! were also shot here. As of July 2009, Alamo Village has been closed to the public. It is available for film production and special events such as weddings and receptions.

The miniseries James A. Michener's Texas (1994) was filmed in and around Brackettville. Other films shot in Brackettville include Arrowhead (1953), Two Rode Together (1961), Bandolero! (1968), Barbarosa (1982), Lonesome Dove (1989), and Bad Girls (1994).

== Geography ==
Brackettville is located near the center of Kinney County at 29°18′55″N 100°24′54″W (29.315349, –100.415120). It is bordered to the south by Fort Clark Springs, an unincorporated community on the site of the former Fort Clark. According to the United States Census Bureau, Brackettville has a total area of 3.2 square miles (8.2 km^{2}), of which 2.8 square miles (7.3 km^{2}) are land and 0.3 sq mi (0.9 km^{2}), or 10.97%, is covered by water.

=== Transportation ===
U.S. Route 90 runs along the southern edge of Brackettville, leading east 39 miles (63 km) to Uvalde and west 30 miles (48 km) to Del Rio. Texas State Highway 131 runs south from Brackettville 45 miles (72 km) to Eagle Pass.

The closest airport with commercial airline service is Del Rio International Airport, on the west side of Del Rio, 32 miles (51 km) from Brackettville.

=== Climate ===
Brackettville has a humid subtropical climate (Köppen Cfa) bordering on a hot semiarid climate (Köppen BSh) with hot summers, mild winters, and variable but moderate rainfall.

Climate data for Brackettville, Texas, 1991–2020 normals, extremes 1990–present
Month	Jan	Feb	Mar	Apr	May	Jun	Jul	Aug	Sep	Oct	Nov	Dec	Year
Record high °F (°C)	86 (30)	97 (36)	96 (36)	105 (41)	109 (43)	106 (41)	107 (42)	109 (43)	107 (42)	100 (38)	90 (32)	87 (31)	109 (43)
Mean maximum °F (°C)	79.0 (26.1)	84.3 (29.1)	88.9 (31.6)	94.3 (34.6)	97.6 (36.4)	100.2 (37.9)	101.5 (38.6)	102.6 (39.2)	97.6 (36.4)	92.7 (33.7)	83.7 (28.7)	78.9 (26.1)	104.5 (40.3)
Mean daily maximum °F (°C)	61.3 (16.3)	66.1 (18.9)	73.1 (22.8)	80.2 (26.8)	86.1 (30.1)	91.7 (33.2)	93.4 (34.1)	94.4 (34.7)	88.2 (31.2)	80.0 (26.7)	69.3 (20.7)	62.8 (17.1)	78.9 (26.1)
Daily mean °F (°C)	48.5 (9.2)	53.2 (11.8)	60.7 (15.9)	67.5 (19.7)	74.9 (23.8)	80.7 (27.1)	82.3 (27.9)	82.7 (28.2)	76.9 (24.9)	68.4 (20.2)	58.1 (14.5)	50.3 (10.2)	67.0 (19.5)
Mean daily minimum °F (°C)	35.7 (2.1)	40.4 (4.7)	48.3 (9.1)	54.8 (12.7)	63.8 (17.7)	69.8 (21.0)	71.2 (21.8)	71.0 (21.7)	65.5 (18.6)	56.7 (13.7)	47.0 (8.3)	37.8 (3.2)	55.2 (12.9)
Mean minimum °F (°C)	22.2 (−5.4)	24.8 (−4.0)	28.8 (−1.8)	37.8 (3.2)	50.7 (10.4)	61.8 (16.6)	66.1 (18.9)	65.8 (18.8)	53.9 (12.2)	38.6 (3.7)	29.6 (−1.3)	23.0 (−5.0)	19.0 (−7.2)
Record low °F (°C)	11 (−12)	7 (−14)	14 (−10)	29 (−2)	37 (3)	54 (12)	58 (14)	59 (15)	46 (8)	23 (−5)	19 (−7)	13 (−11)	7 (−14)
Average precipitation inches (mm)	0.90 (23)	0.95 (24)	1.81 (46)	1.38 (35)	3.27 (83)	2.51 (64)	1.86 (47)	2.61 (66)	3.71 (94)	2.61 (66)	1.35 (34)	1.09 (28)	24.05 (610)
Average snowfall inches (cm)	0.0 (0.0)	0.0 (0.0)	0.0 (0.0)	0.0 (0.0)	0.0 (0.0)	0.0 (0.0)	0.0 (0.0)	0.0 (0.0)	0.0 (0.0)	0.0 (0.0)	0.0 (0.0)	0.1 (0.25)	0.1 (0.25)
Average precipitation days (≥ 0.01 in)	5.7	5.4	6.4	5.6	7.9	5.7	4.5	5.5	7.0	5.2	4.8	5.7	69.4
Average snowy days (≥ 0.1 in)	0.0	0.0	0.0	0.0	0.0	0.0	0.0	0.0	0.0	0.0	0.0	0.1	0.1
Source 1: NOAA
Source 2: National Weather Service

== Demographics ==
Historical population
Census	Pop.	Note	%±
1880	1,126		—
1890	1,649		46.4%
1930	1,822		—
1940	2,653		45.6%
1950	1,858		−30.0%
1960	1,662		−10.5%
1970	1,539		−7.4%
1980	1,676		8.9%
1990	1,740		3.8%
2000	1,876		7.8%
2010	1,688		−10.0%
2020	1,341		−20.6%
U.S. Decennial Census

=== 2020 census ===
As of the 2020 census, 1,341 people were living in Brackettville, with a median age of 41.2 years; 24.6% of residents were under 18 and 21.3% were 65 or older. For every 100 females, there were 98.4 males, and for every 100 females 18 and over, there were 90.8 males.

None of the residents lived in urban areas, while 100.0% lived in rural areas.

Of the 497 households in Brackettville,31.2% had children under 18 living in them, 46.3% were married-couple households, 17.5% were households with a male householder and no spouse or partner present, and 33.8% were households with a female householder and no spouse or partner present. About 32.0% of all households were made up of individuals, and 17.1% had someone living alone who was 65 or older.

The city had 596 housing units, of which 16.6% were vacant. Among occupied housing units, 73.8% were owner-occupied and 26.2% were renter-occupied. The homeowner vacancy rate was 1.8% and the rental vacancy rate was 7.1%.

Racial composition as of the 2020 census
Race	Percentage
White	43.7%
Black or African American	2.4%
American Indian and Alaska Native	1.0%
Asian	0%
Native Hawaiian and other Pacific Islander	0.1%
Some other race	15.4%
Two or more races	37.4%
Hispanic or Latino (of any race)	73.4%

=== 2000 census ===
As of the 2000 census, 1,876 people, 618 households, and 438 families were residing in the city. The population density was 591.8 inhabitants per square mile (228.5/km^{2}). The 766 housing units had an average density of 241.6 per square mile (93.3/km^{2}). The racial makeup of the city was 64.77% White, 2.67% African American, 0.59% Native American, 0.05% Asian, 28.09% from other races, and 3.84% from two or more races. Hispanics or [Latinos of any race were 74.36% of the population. According to Ethnologue, 200 Afro-Seminole Creole speakers are in Brackettville, which makes the town the only one in the country where this creole is still spoken.

Of the 618 households, 38.5% had children under 18 living with them, 56.0% were married couples living together, 10.2% had a female householder with no husband present, and 29.1% were not families. About 27.3% of all households were made up of individuals, and 15.9% had someone living alone who was 65 or older. The average household size was 3.00, and the average family size was 3.72.

In the city, the age distribution was 33.5% under 18, 7.4% from 18 to 24, 24.6% from 25 to 44, 19.2% from 45 to 64, and 15.4% who were 65 or older. The median age was 33 years. For every 100 females, there were 98.5 males. For every 100 females 18 and over, there were 96.4 males.

The median income in the city for a household was $19,410 and for a family was $24,063. Males had a median income of $21,806 versus $14,773 for females. The per capita income for the city was $9,332. About 31.2% of families and 33.4% of the population were below the poverty line, including 37.3% of those under 18 and 30.2% of those 65 or over.

== Education ==
Brackettville is served by the Brackett Independent School District.

== Climate ==
The climate in this area is characterized by hot, humid summers and generally mild to cool winters. According to the Köppen climate classification, Brackettville has a humid subtropical climate, Cfa on climate maps.
