= List of comedy films of the 1920s =

A list of comedy films released in the 1920s.

Title	Director	Cast	Country	Subgenre/Notes
1920
One Week	Edward F. Cline, Buster Keaton	Buster Keaton, Sybil Seely	United States	Short film
Easy to Get	Walter Edwards	Marguerite Clark and Harrison Ford	United States	
The Life of the Party	Joseph Henabery	Roscoe "Fatty" Arbuckle	United States	
Pollyanna	Paul Powell	Mary Pickford	United States	
The Round Up	George Melford	Roscoe "Fatty" Arbuckle and Wallace Beery	United States	
The Saphead	Herbert Blaché, Winchell Smith	Buster Keaton, William H. Crane, Beulah Booker, Irving Cummings, Carol Holloway	United States	
Suds	John Francis Dillon	Mary Pickford	United States	
The Garage	Roscoe "Fatty" Arbuckle	Roscoe "Fatty" Arbuckle, Buster Keaton, Molly Malone	United States	Short film
Convict 13	Buster Keaton, Edward F. Cline	Buster Keaton, Sybil Seely, Joe Roberts	United States	Short film
The Scarecrow	Buster Keaton, Edward F. Cline	Buster Keaton, Sybil Seely, Joe Roberts, Joe Keaton	United States	Short film
Neighbors	Buster Keaton, Edward F. Cline	Buster Keaton, Virginia Fox, Joe Roberts	United States	Short film
The Flapper	Alan Crosland	Olive Thomas, William P. Carleton, Theodore Westman Jr., Warren Cook	United States	
1921
A Lucky Dog	Jess Robbins	Stan Laurel and Oliver Hardy	United States	
Now or Never	Hal Roach and Fred C. Newmeyer	Harold Lloyd	United States	
The Idle Class	Charlie Chaplin	Charlie Chaplin, Edna Purviance, Henry Bergman and Mack Swain	United States	
The Goat	Buster Keaton and Malcolm St. Clair	Buster Keaton, Virginia Fox, Joe Roberts, Malcolm St. Clair, Edward F. Cline and Jean C. Havez	United States	Short film
Among Those Present	Fred C. Newmeyer	Harold Lloyd and Mildred Davis	United States	
Brewster's Millions	Joseph Henabery	Fatty Arbuckle	United States	
Crazy to Marry	James Cruze	Fatty Arbuckle	United States	
The Dollar a Year Man	James Cruze	Fatty Arbuckle	United States	
Eden and Return	William A. Seiter	Doris May, Emmett King, and Margaret Livingston	United States	
The Fast Freight (Freight Prepaid or Via Fast Freight)	James Cruze	Fatty Arbuckle	United States	
Gasoline Gus	James Cruze	Fatty Arbuckle	United States	
The Girl in the Taxi	Lloyd Ingraham	Flora Parker DeHaven, Carter DeHaven, King Baggot, Grace Cunard, and Otis Harlan	United States	
Keeping up with Lizzie			United States	
The Kid	Charlie Chaplin	Charlie Chaplin and Jackie Coogan	United States	
Leap Year	Roscoe Arbuckle and James Cruze	Fatty Arbuckle	United States	
A Sailor-Made Man	Fred Newmeyer	Harold Lloyd	United States	
The Traveling Salesman	Joseph Henabery	Fatty Arbuckle	United States	
Humor Risk	Dick Smith	Chico Marx, Groucho Marx. Harpo Marx, and Zeppo Marx	United States	
The Haunted House	Buster Keaton, Edward F. Cline	Buster Keaton, Virginia Fox, Joe Roberts	United States	Short film
Hard Luck	Buster Keaton, Edward F. Cline	Buster Keaton, Virginia Fox, Joe Roberts	United States	Short film
The High Sign	Buster Keaton, Edward F. Cline	Buster Keaton, Bartine Burkett, Joe Roberts, Charles Dorety	United States	Short film
The Playhouse	Buster Keaton, Edward F. Cline	Buster Keaton	United States	Short film
The Boat	Buster Keaton, Edward F. Cline	Buster Keaton, Sybil Seely	United States	Short film
1922
Cops	Edward F. Cline and Buster Keaton	Buster Keaton	United States	Short film
Mixed Nuts	James Parrott and Robin Williamson	Stan Laurel	United States	
Glad Bags			United States	
Our Gang	Charley Chase, Robert F. McGowan, Tom McNamara, and Fred Newmeyer	Ernest Morrison, John Hatton, Anna Mae Bilson, Jackie Condon, and Mickey Daniels	United States	Short film
Pay Day	Charlie Chaplin	Charlie Chaplin	United States	
Doctor Jack	Fred Newmeyer	Harold Lloyd	United States	
Don't Get Personal	Clarence G. Badger	Marie Prevost, George Nichols and Daisy Jefferson	United States	
Gay and Devilish	William A. Seiter	Doris May, Cullen Landis and Otis Harlan	United States	
Grandma's Boy	Fred C. Newmeyer	Harold Lloyd	United States	
The Ladder Jinx			United States	
Red Hot Romance	Victor Fleming	Basil Sydney	United States	
Up and at 'Em	William A. Seiter	Doris May, Hallam Cooley, and J. Herbert Frank	United States	
The Paleface	Buster Keaton, Edward F. Cline	Buster Keaton, Virginia Fox, Joe Roberts	United States	Short film
My Wife's Relations	Buster Keaton	Buster Keaton, Kate Price, Wheezer Dell, Joe Roberts, Harry Madison, Tom Wilson, Monte Collins	United States	Short film
The Blacksmith	Buster Keaton, Malcolm St. Clair	Buster Keaton, Virginia Fox, Joe Roberts	United States	Short film
The Frozen North	Buster Keaton, Edward F. Cline	Buster Keaton, Sybil Seely, Joe Roberts, Freeman Wood	United States	Short film
The Electric House	Buster Keaton, Edward F. Cline	Buster Keaton, Virginia Fox, Joe Roberts	United States	Short film
Day Dreams	Buster Keaton, Edward F. Cline	Buster Keaton, Renée Adorée, Joe Roberts, Joe Keaton	United States	Short film
1923
One Exciting Evening	Billy West	Billy West	United States	
The Balloonatic	Buster Keaton and Edward F. Cline	Buster Keaton	United States	
Dogs of War	Robert F. McGowan	Joe Cobb, Jackie Condon, Mickey Daniels, Jack Davis, Allen Hoskins, Mary Kornman, and Ernie Morrison	United States	
Gas and Air	Scott Pembroke	Stan Laurel	United States	
Kill or Cure	Scott Pembroke	Stan Laurel	United States	
The Love Nest	Edward F. Cline and Buster Keaton	Buster Keaton	United States	
The Pilgrim (1923 film)	Charlie Chaplin	Charlie Chaplin and Edna Purviance	United States	
A Powder Romance			United States	
Puritan Passions	Frank Tuttle	Glenn Hunter, Mary Astor, and Osgood Perkins	United States	Comedy horror
The Brass Bottle	Maurice Tourneur		United States	
The Near Lady	Herbert Blaché	Gladys Walton, Jerry Gendron, Hank Mann, Kate Price, Otis Harlan and Florence Drew.	United States	
Our Hospitality	Buster Keaton and John G. Blystone	Buster Keaton	United States	
Safety Last!	Fred C. Newmeyer and Sam Taylor	Harold Lloyd	United States	
Souls for Sale	Rupert Hughes	Eleanor Boardman,	United States	
Three Ages	Buster Keaton and Edward F. Cline	Buster Keaton and Wallace Beery	United States	
Why Worry?	Fred Newmeyer and Sam Taylor	Harold Lloyd	United States	
1924
Girl Shy	Fred C. Newmeyer and Sam Taylor	Harold Lloyd	United States	
Mother, Mother, Mother Pin a Rose on Me	Dave Fleischer		United States	
Portage Due			United States	
Happiness	King Vidor	Laurette Taylor	United States	
Hot Water	Fred C. Newmeyer and Sam Taylor	Harold Lloyd	United States	
The Last Man on Earth	John G. Blystone	Earle Foxe	United States	
Lover's Lane	Phil Rosen	Robert Ellis and Gertrude Olmstead.	United States	
The Navigator	Buster Keaton and Donald Crisp	Buster Keaton	United States	
Sherlock Jr.	Buster Keaton	Buster Keaton, Kathryn McGuire, Joe Keaton, and Ward Crane	United States	
1925
The Monster	Roland West	Lon Chaney and Johnny Arthur	United States	Comedy horror
Dr. Pyckle and Mr. Pryde	Scott Pembroke and Joe Rock	Stan Laurel	United States	Comedy horror
The Eagle	Clarence Brown	Rudolph Valentino, Vilma Bánky, and Louise Dresser	United States	
The Freshman	Fred C. Newmeyer and Sam Taylor	Harold Lloyd, Jobyna Ralston, Brooks Benedict, and James Anderson.	United States	
The Gold Rush	Charlie Chaplin	Charlie Chaplin, Georgia Hale, Mack Swain, Tom Murray, Henry Bergman, and Malcolm Waite.	United States	
Seven Chances	Buster Keaton	Buster Keaton, T. Roy Barnes, Snitz Edwards, Ruth Dwyer	United States	
Go West	Buster Keaton	Buster Keaton, Howard Truesdale, Kathleen Myers	United States	
1926
My Old Kentucky Home	Dave Fleischer		United States	
The Bat	Roland West	Jack Pickford and Louise Fazenda	United States	Comedy horror
For Heaven's Sake	Sam Taylor	Harold Lloyd	United States	
The Strong Man	Frank Capra	Harry Langdon	United States	
Tramp, Tramp, Tramp	Harry Edwards	Harry Langdon and Joan Crawford	United States	
Tartuffe	F. W. Murnau	Emil Jannings and Werner Krauss	Germany	
The General	Buster Keaton and Clyde Bruckman	Buster Keaton and Marion Mack	United States	
Battling Butler	Buster Keaton	Buster Keaton, Snitz Edwards, Sally O'Neil	United States	
1927
Do Detectives Think?	Fred Guiol	Stan Laurel and Oliver Hardy	United States	
Hats Off	Hal Yates	Stan Laurel and Oliver Hardy	United States	
Love 'em and Weep	Fred Guiol	Mae Busch, Stan Laurel and James Finlayson	United States	
The Student Prince in Old Heidelberg	Ernst Lubitsch	Ramón Novarro, Norma Shearer, and Philippe De Lacy	United States	Comedy drama
The Cat and the Canary	Paul Leni	Laura La Plante, Forrest Stanley, and Creighton Hale	United States	Comedy horror
The Gorilla	Alfred Santell	Charles Murray, Fred Kelsey and Walter Pidgeon	United States	Comedy horror
His First Flame	Harry Edwards	Harry Langdon, Natalie Kingston, Ruth Hiatt, and Vernon Dent	United States	
The Kid Brother	Ted Wilde, J.A. Howe (co-director), Harold Lloyd (uncredited), and Lewis Milestone (uncredited)	Harold Lloyd	United States	
Long Pants	Frank Capra	Harry Langdon	United States	
Three's a Crowd	Harry Langdon	Harry Langdon, Gladys McConnell, Cornelius Keefe and Arthur Thalasso	United States	
College	Buster Keaton, James W. Horne	Buster Keaton, Anne Cornwall	United States	
It	Clarence G. Badger	Clara Bow, Antonio Moreno, William Austin	United States	
1928
The Gallopin' Gaucho	Ub Iwerks	Walt Disney	United States	
Pass the Gravy	Fred Guiol	Max Davidson, Gene Morgan, Spec O'Donnell, Martha Sleeper, and Bert Sprotte	United States	
Plane Crazy	Walt Disney and Ub Iwerks	Walt Disney	United States	
Steamboat Willie	Walt Disney and Ub Iwerks	Walt Disney	United States	
Two Tars	James Parrott	Stan Laurel and Oliver Hardy	United States	
You're Darn Tootin'	E. L. Kennedy	Stan Laurel and Oliver Hardy	United States	
The Chaser			United States	
The Circus	Charlie Chaplin	Charlie Chaplin, Al Ernest Garcia, Merna Kennedy, Harry Crocker, George Davis and Henry Bergman	United States	
A Girl in Every Port	Howard Hawks	Victor McLaglen, Robert Armstrong, and Louise Brooks	United States	
The Matinee Idol	Frank Capra	Bessie Love and Johnnie Walker	United States	
Show People	King Vidor	Marion Davies and William Haines	United States	
Speedy	Ted Wilde	Harold Lloyd	United States	
Steamboat Bill Jr.	Buster Keaton, Charles Reisner	Buster Keaton, Ernest Torrence, Tom McGuire, Marion Byron	United States	
The Cameraman	Buster Keaton, Edward Sedgwick	Buster Keaton, Marceline Day, Harold Goodwin	United States	
The Baby Cyclone	A. Edward Sutherland	Lew Cody, Aileen Pringle, Robert Armstrong, Gwen Lee	United States	
1929
Big Business	James W. Horne and Leo McCarey	Stan Laurel and Oliver Hardy	United States	
The Cocoanuts	Robert Florey and Joseph Santley	Groucho Marx, Harpo Marx, Chico Marx, Zeppo Marx, Mary Eaton, Oscar Shaw, Margaret Dumont and Kay Francis	United States	
The Hollywood Revue of 1929	Charles Reisner	Conrad Nagel and Jack Benny	United States	
Jazz Heaven	Melville Brown	Sally O'Neil, Johnny Mack Brown, and Clyde Cook	United States	
Lambchops	Murray Roth	Burns & Allen	United States	
Navy Blues	Clarence Brown	William Haines and Anita Page	United States	
Rio Rita	Luther Reed	Bebe Daniels, John Boles, Bert Wheeler, and Robert Woolsey	United States	
Street Girl	Wesley Ruggles	Betty Compson, John Harron and Jack Oakie	United States	
Tanned Legs	Marshall Neilan	Ann Pennington, Arthur Lake, June Clyde, Dorothy Revier, Sally Blane and Albert Gran	United States	
Unaccustomed As We Are	Lewis R. Foster and Hal Roach	Stan Laurel and Oliver Hardy	United States	
The Vagabond Lover	Marshall Neilan	Rudy Vallee, Sally Blane, Marie Dressler, and Charles Sellon	United States	
The Very Idea	Frank Craven and Richard Rosson	Sally Blane, Hugh Trevor, Allen Kearns, Doris Eaton and Frank Craven	United States	
Welcome Danger	Clyde Bruckman	Harold Lloyd	United States	
The Wild Party	Dorothy Arzner	Clara Bow and Fredric March	United States	
Words and Music	James Tinling	Lois Moran, Helen Twelvetrees, and Frank Albertson	United States	
Spite Marriage	Buster Keaton, Edward Sedgwick	Buster Keaton, Dorothy Sebastian, Edward Earle	United States	
