= The Love Nest =

The Love Nest may refer to:

- The Love Nest (1922 film) a.k.a. Das Liebesnest, is a 1922 German silent film directed by Rudolf Walther-Fein.
- The Love Nest (1922), an American film directed by Wray Bartlett Physioc.
- The Love Nest (1923 film), an American short silent comedy by Buster Keaton
- The Love Nest (1933 film), a British comedy directed by Thomas Bentley

== See also ==
- Love Nest, a 1951 American comedy drama film directed by Joseph Newman
- "Love Nest", a song from the 1920 musical Mary, music by Louis Hirsch and words by Otto Harbach
