= Fred Gabourie =

Canadian production designer (1881–1951)

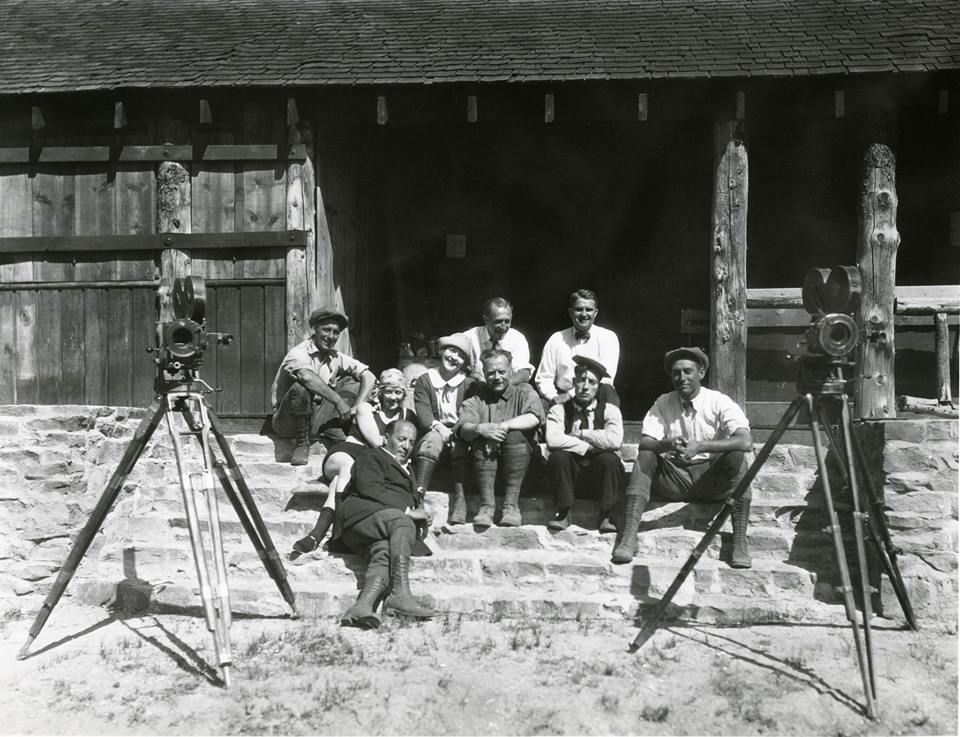
- Gabourie - center - flanked by Phyllis Haver and Buster Keaton (Buster in front of Eddie Cline) on location for The Balloonatic (1923)
- Born: Fred Gabourie; September 19, 1881; Tweed, Ontario, Canada
- Died: March 1, 1951 (aged 69); Hollywood, California, U.S.
- Occupations: Technical Director, Art Director; Production Manager
- Years active: c.1918–1951

Fred Gabourie (September 19, 1881–March 1, 1951) was a technical director and department head.

Gabourie was born in Tweed, Ontario, Canada. He was a member of the Seneca Indian tribe. He served in the Spanish–American War.

He worked primarily for Buster Keaton, figuring out how to make Keaton's innovative stunts work. As one author put it, "Fred Gabourie had the most interesting job in the world: He solved problems for Buster Keaton." As technical director, he was responsible for set design, construction, props management, and location scouting. During this time, he designed the electric house in The Electric House, which featured an automated staircase, library, swimming pool, and dining room. He located and purchased the ship for The Navigator. Only after Gabourie found the ship and suggested to Keaton that it would be a great prop to build a movie around did Keaton and his staff come up with a script. Gabourie also worked out how to accomplish the famous stunt in Steamboat Bill, Jr. in which the front of a house (weighing two tons) falls on Keaton without harming him.

Keaton and Gabourie, working with an architect, co-designed Keaton's lavish Beverly Hills mansion, eventually called the Italian Villa.

Gabourie was also responsible for the ships in the silent version of The Sea Hawk.

Gabourie went to MGM with Keaton but worked on just one picture with him (The Cameraman) before MGM promoted him to construction superintendent, a position he held until he died.

Gabourie's son, Fred Gabourie Jr., played some small parts in film and on TV, but eventually became a judge.

== Bibliography ==
- Blesh, Rudi (1966). Keaton. New York: The MacMillan Company.
- Foote, Lisle (2014). Buster Keaton's Crew: The Team Behind His Silent Films. McFarland & Company.
- Meade, Marion (1995). Buster Keaton: Cut to the Chase. HarperCollins.
