= The Paleface =

The Paleface may refer to:

- The Paleface (1922 film), a Buster Keaton comedy
- The Paleface (1948 film), a Western comedy starring Bob Hope and Jane Russell
