= The High Sign =

1921 film

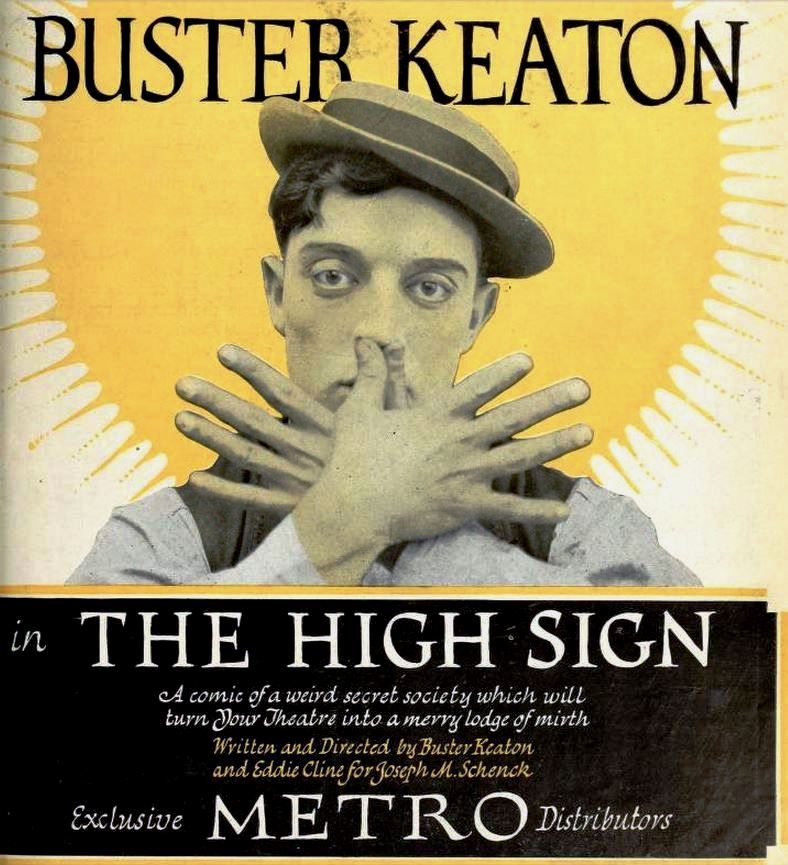
- Buster gives the titular "high sign"
- Directed by: Edward F. Cline; Buster Keaton
- Written by: Edward F. Cline; Buster Keaton
- Produced by: Joseph M. Schenck
- Starring: Buster Keaton; Bartine Burkett; Charles Dorety; Al St. John
- Cinematography: Elgin Lessley
- Edited by: Buster Keaton
- Distributed by: Metro Pictures
- Release date: April 12, 1921
- Running time: 21 minutes
- Country: United States
- Languages: Silent film English (original) intertitles

The High Sign is a 1921 two-reel silent comedy film starring Buster Keaton, and written and directed by Keaton and Edward F. Cline. Its runtime is 21 minutes. Although One Week (1920) was Keaton's first independent film short released, The High Sign was the first one made. Disappointed with the result, Keaton shelved it and the film was not released until the following year. The title refers to the secret hand signal used by the film's underworld gang.

== Plot ==
Full short

Keaton plays a drifter who cons his way into working at an amusement park shooting gallery. Believing Keaton is an expert marksman, both the murderous gang the Blinking Buzzards and the man they want to kill end up hiring him. The film ends with a wild chase through a house filled with secret passages and trap doors.

== Cast ==
- Buster Keaton - Our Hero (as 'Buster' Keaton)
- Bartine Burkett - Miss Nickelnurser (uncredited)
- Ingram B. Pickett - Tiny Tim (tall villain) (uncredited)
- Charles Dorety - Drunk (uncredited)
- Al St. John - Man in target practice (uncredited)

== Production ==
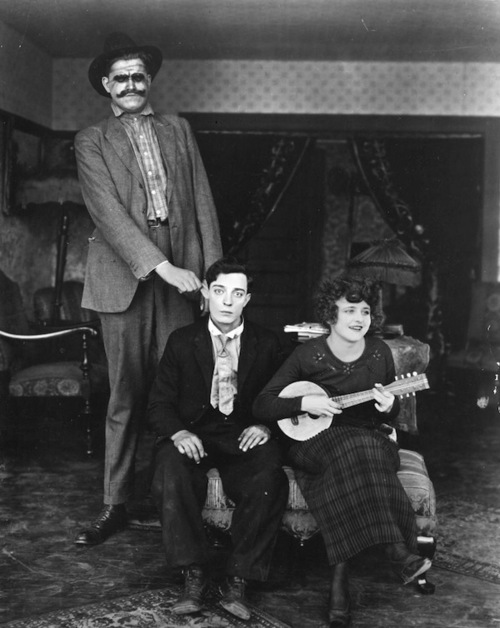
(L. to r.) Ingram B. Pickett, Keaton, and Bartine Burkett on the set

The High Sign was Keaton's first independent production. In contrast to the "violent slapstick" of the films he had made with Fatty Arbuckle, this short film evinces the "dry and quiet comedy style" which would become Keaton's trademark.

The climactic chase scenes inside the house take place on a split-level, cutaway set with revolving wall panels, trap doors, and hidden corridors in all the rooms. Filming took place at the studios of the Comique Film Corporation recently vacated by Arbuckle. Keaton also began working with Arbuckle's former cinematographer Elgin Lessley and technical director Fred Gabourie, who remained with him until he signed with MGM in 1929.

== Release ==
Though Keaton completed The High Sign a year earlier, he delayed its release because he felt it too closely mimicked Arbuckle's style; he also "thought the gags were too ridiculous and clever for their own sake". The High Sign was released April 4, 1921. At that time, Keaton had broken his ankle while filming the first version of The Electric House and his company needed to market a new film.

== Contemporary soundtracks ==
Guitarist Bill Frisell released a soundtrack to the film in 1995 on his album The High Sign/One Week. The Rats & People Motion Picture Orchestra premiered its new score for the film in 2008. Carl Davis composed an original score in 2017.

== See also ==
- List of American films of 1921
- Buster Keaton filmography

== Sources ==
- Keaton, Eleanor; Vance, Jeffrey (2001). Buster Keaton Remembered. Harry N. Abrams Inc. ISBN 9780810942271.
