= Joe Roberts (actor) =

American actor (1871–1923)

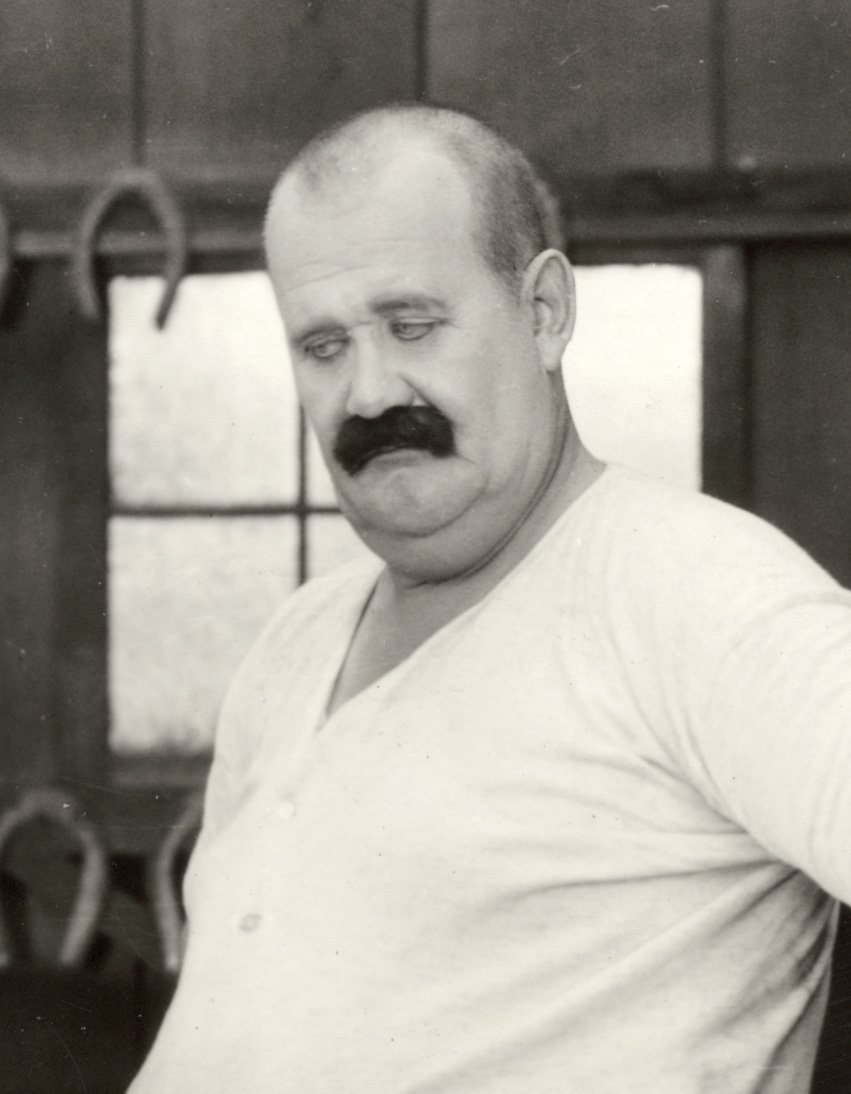
- Still from The Blacksmith (1922)
- Born: Joseph Henry Roberts; February 2, 1871; Amsterdam, New York, U.S.
- Died: October 28, 1923 (aged 52); Los Angeles, California, U.S.

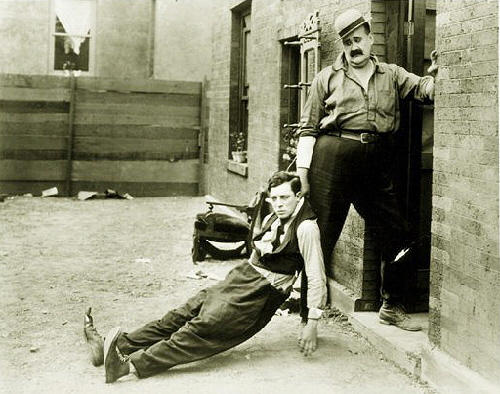
Roberts dragging Buster Keaton in a still from Neighbors (1920)

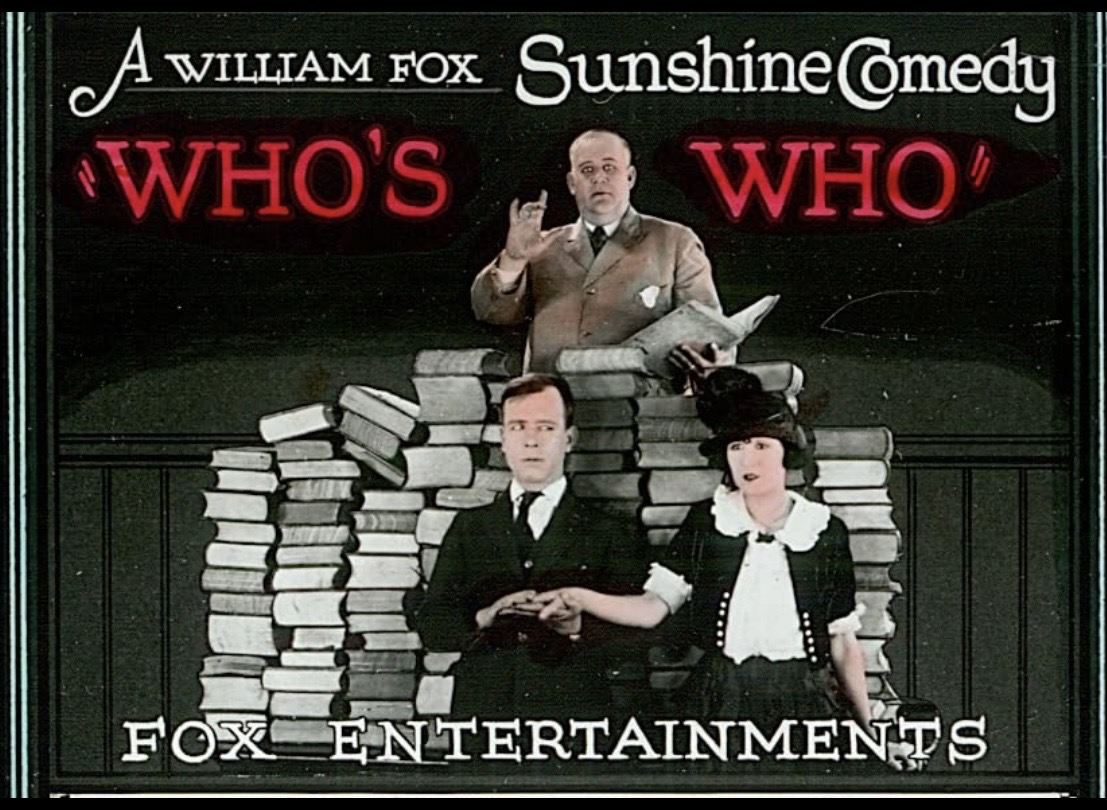
Who’s Who (1921)

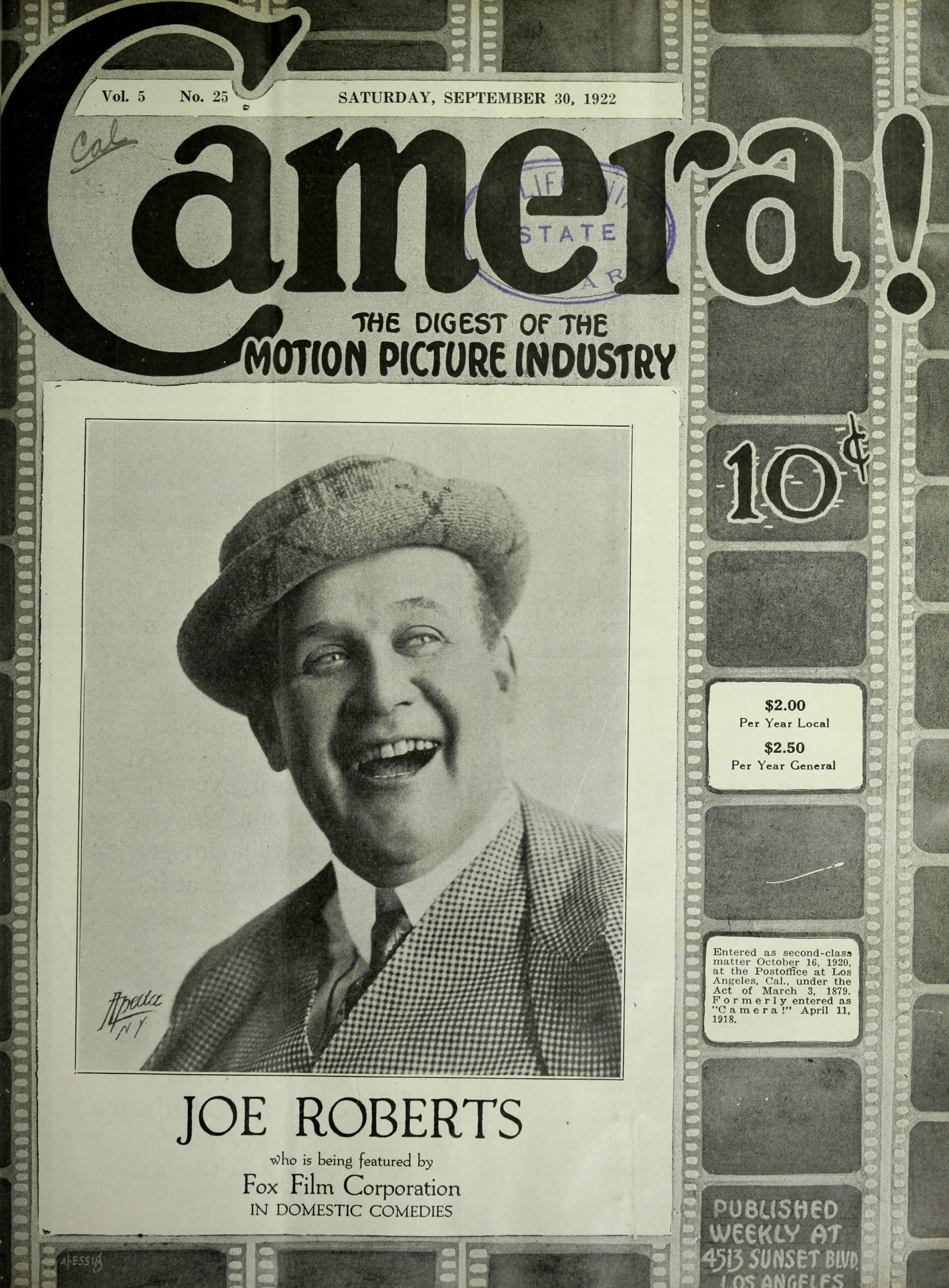
Camera! Magazine (1922)

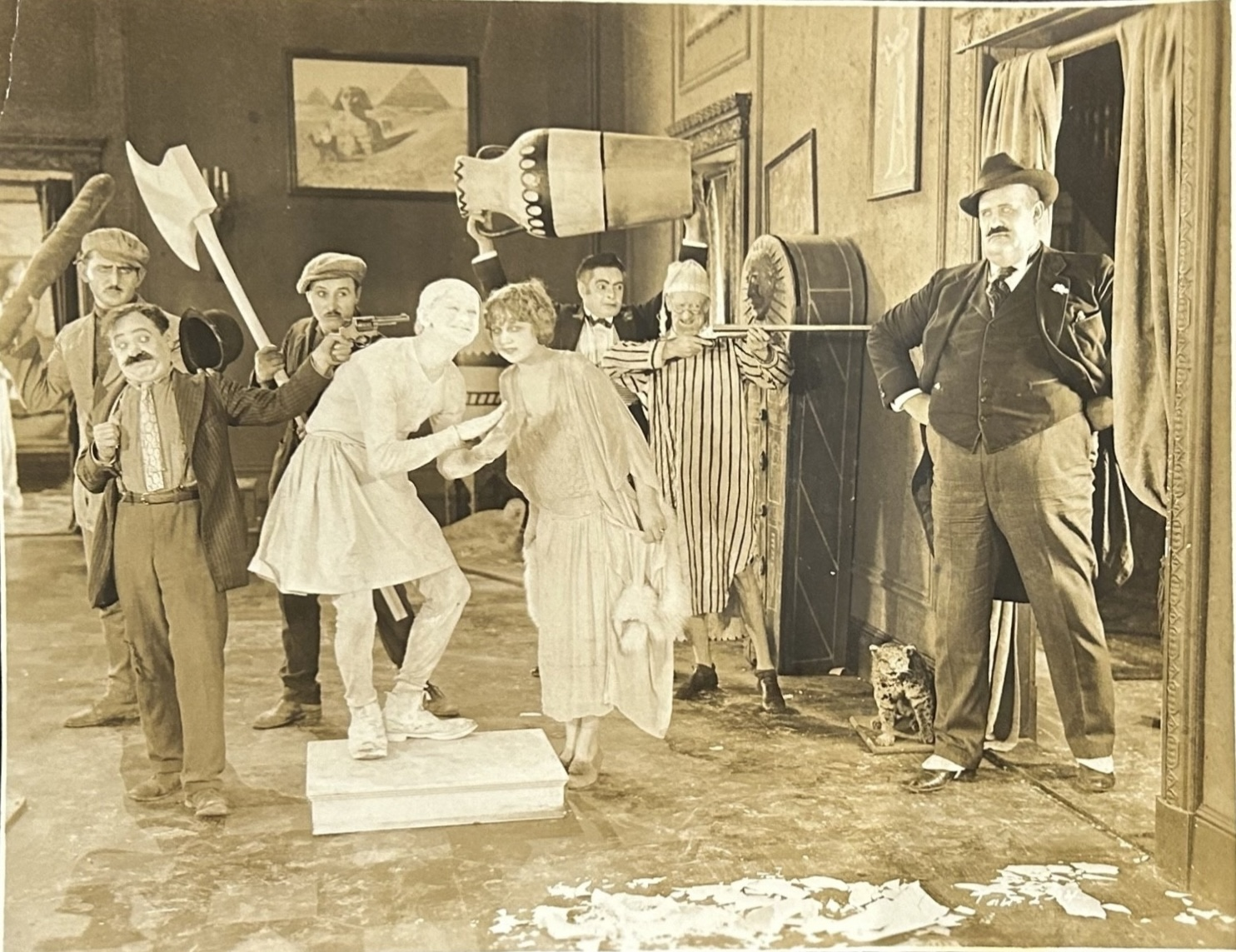
With Engle & Duffy in The Mummy (1923)

Joseph Henry Roberts (February 2, 1871 – October 28, 1923) was an American comic actor who appeared in 16 of Buster Keaton's 19 silent short films of the 1920s.

"Big Joe" Roberts, as he was known in vaudeville, toured the country with his first wife, Lillian Stuart Roberts, as part of a rowdy act known as Roberts, Hays, and Roberts. Their signature routine was "The Cowboy, the Swell and the Lady." At this time, the first decade of the twentieth century, Buster Keaton's father, Joe Keaton, had a summer Actors' Colony for vaudevillians between Lake Michigan and Muskegon Lake in Michigan, where Roberts got to know the Keaton family.

When Buster's apprenticeship with Roscoe "Fatty" Arbuckle came to an end and Keaton began making his own short films in 1920, he asked Roberts to join him. The hefty 6 ft 3 in (191 cm) Roberts, usually playing a menacing heavy or authority figure, made an amusing contrast next to thin, 5 ft 6 in (168 cm) Keaton. Roberts played "Roaring Bill" Rivers in 1922's The Primitive Lover starring Keaton's sister-in-law Constance Talmadge and silent film actor Harrison Ford. He also had signed a deal with Fox Films, and played such roles as a drill master in the Clyde Cook comedy The Misfit, released in March 1924, after Roberts' death.

When Keaton began making feature films in 1923, he apparently intended to keep working with Roberts. Roberts had roles in Keaton's Three Ages and Our Hospitality (both 1923). On August 17, while filming Our Hospitality, Roberts had a stroke. A Wassermann test, ordered by consulting physician Dr. Louis Regan, confirmed a diagnosis of late-onset neurosyphilis, a fatal disease that causes seizures, dementia, and paralysis. Roberts returned – weakened – to finish the film, and would live to attend an October 17, 1923, Glendale preview, but died of a second stroke just after midnight of the following day.

== Filmography ==
Film	Year	Character	Ref	
One Week	1920	Piano Mover (uncredited)	Short	
Convict 13	1920	The Crazed Prisoner	Short	
The Scarecrow	1920	Farmhand (uncredited)	Short	
Neighbors	1920	Her Father (uncredited)	Short	
The Haunted House	1921	Bank Cashier	Short	
Hard Luck	1921	Lizard Lip Luke	Short	
The High Sign	1921	Leader of Buzzards (uncredited)	Short	
His Meal Ticket	1921	Organ Grinder	Short	
The Goat	1921	Police Chief	Short	
Who's Who	1921	The Judge	Short	
The Devilish Romeo	1921		Short	
Little Lord Fauntleroy	1921	Buzz Saw Brannigan (uncredited)		
The Play House	1921	Actor-Stage Manager (uncredited)	Short	
One Moment, Please	1921		Short	
The Paleface	1922	The Indian Chief (uncredited)	Short	
Cops	1922	Police Chief (uncredited)	Short	
The Primitive Lover	1922	'Roaring' Bill Rivers		
My Wife's Relations	1922	Brother (uncredited)	Short	
The Blacksmith	1922	Blacksmith (uncredited)	Short	
The Frozen North	1922	The Driver	Short	
The Electric House	1922	Millionaire (uncredited)	Short	
Day Dreams	1922	The Mayor (uncredited)	Short	
The Love Nest	1923	Captain of the Whaler	Short	
The Four Flusher	1923	The Russian Count		
The Mummy	1923	Big Joe		
Three Ages	1923	The Girl's Father		
Our Hospitality	1923	Joseph Canfield		
No Loafing		Big piano carrier		Short
The Misfit	1924	The Drill Master		Short
