= The Goat (1921 film) =

1921 film

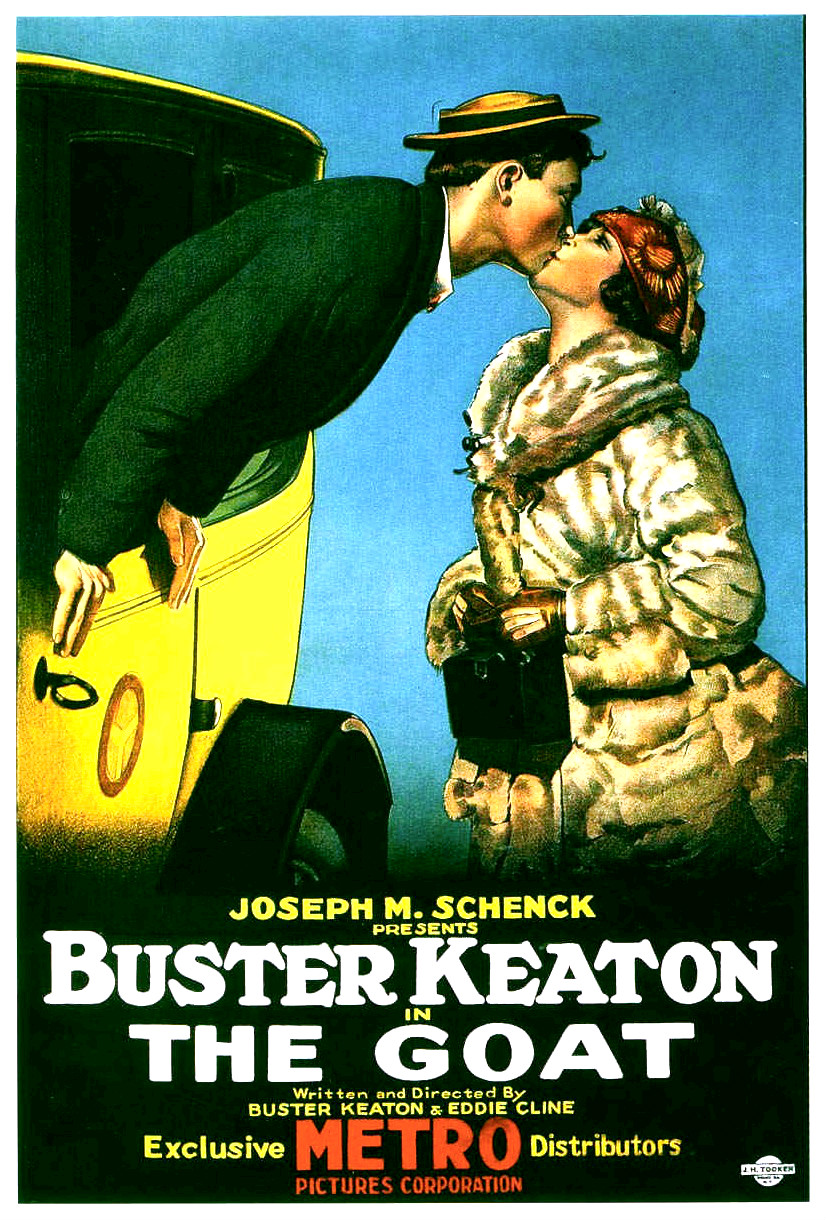
- Theatrical poster
- Directed by: Buster Keaton; Malcolm St. Clair
- Written by: Buster Keaton; Malcolm St. Clair
- Produced by: Joseph M. Schenck
- Starring: Buster Keaton; Virginia Fox; Joe Roberts; Malcolm St. Clair; Edward F. Cline; Jean C. Havez
- Cinematography: Elgin Lessley
- Distributed by: Metro Pictures
- Release date: May 18, 1921
- Running time: 23 minutes
- Country: United States
- Language: Silent film (English intertitles)

Full-length video of The Goat

The Goat is a 1921 American two-reel silent comedy film written, and co-directed by Malcolm St. Clair and Buster Keaton and starring Keaton.

The comic premise for The Goat emerges as a series of mistaken identities in which Keaton is mistaken for a murderer who is pursued by a posse. Keaton’s love interest is the daughter of the policeman leading the manhunt.

This short contains one of Keaton's more memorable images: a distant, speeding train approaches the camera, and stops with a close-up of Keaton, who has been sitting on the front of the locomotive's cowcatcher.

== Plot ==
Buster joins a queue for free bread, but does not note that he is standing behind two unmoving mannequins. By the time he spots his mistake, there is no more bread left.

Next, Buster peers into a police station where captured murderer "Dead Shot Dan" is about to have his picture taken for the "Rogue's Gallery". While the photographer is not looking, Dan ducks his head and snaps the shutter, so the camera captures a picture of Buster looking through the barred window. Dan then covertly hangs his cap over the camera lens to ensure that he will not be photographed. Thus, when Dan escapes shortly afterward, the wanted posters all show Buster with his hands on the bars. Unaware, Buster moves on to a street corner, where he notices a horseshoe and kicks it aside. The next man who comes along picks it up and throws it for good luck. Within seconds the man finds a wallet filled with money. After scrambling to find the horseshoe, Buster picks it up and throws over his shoulder. It strikes a policeman, who chases Buster, and soon other officers join the chase. Buster lures them into the back of a truck, locks them in, and escapes.

Buster sees a man arguing with a young woman walking her dog. Buster defends the woman and throws the man to the ground. After walking away, Buster runs into the officers who had chased him earlier. He escapes by hopping onto a train going to a nearby town. Unfortunately for Buster, the town has heard of Dan's escape, and newspapers and wanted posters with Buster's picture are everywhere. The townspeople run from him in terror wherever he goes.

Buster is once again in the wrong place at the wrong time when the police chief on his patrol is ambushed by a gangster. The gangster's bullets miss the officer, but the smoking gun ends up in Buster's hand. He runs from the persistent police chief, inadvertently causing mischief all over the town. While on the run, Buster encounters the same young woman he assisted earlier, who invites him to dinner. At her home he meets her father—he is the police chief, and he furiously chases Buster all over the apartment building. After the young woman helps Buster escape, the pair emerge onto the street where Buster observes a sign outside a furniture store that says "You furnish the girl, we furnish the home!" He carries her into the store.

== Cast ==
- Buster Keaton as Buster
- Virginia Fox as Chief's daughter
- Joe Roberts as Police Chief
- Malcolm St. Clair as Dead Shot Dan (as Mal St. Clair)
- Edward F. Cline as Cop by telephone pole
- Jean C. Havez in a bit part

== Background ==
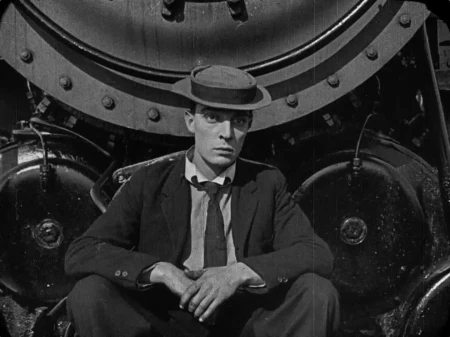
Buster Keaton on locomotive's cowcatcher, escaping police

St. Clair, who directed films for the Mack Sennett studios between 1919 and 1921, was fired and later rehired by Sennett. As such, St. Clair directed films for other studios during this period, among these Rainbow studio’s He Loved Like He Lied (1920), Reelcraft’s Welcome Home (1920) and Buster Keaton Productions' The Goat.

Keaton’s influence on St. Clair was transformative in terms of narrative style, control over gag configuration, rhythm and pacing, and an effective approach to coaching actors. Ruth Anne Dwyer argues that "so profound an effect had Buster Keaton" on St. Clair that the latter’s films can be appraised as either "pre"- or "post"-Keaton.

St. Clair adapted Keaton’s development of "integrated comic structures" which served to cohere the gag elements and make them comprehensible in terms of a social conflict and its resolution.

St. Clair’s early two-reelers for Mack Sennett studios were amalgamations of largely unrelated gags and "flimsy plots".

After his collaboration with Keaton on The Goat and The Blacksmith (1921), St. Clair crafted his films "as fully integrated structures. The hero confronts a social problem in each episode, around which all the action occurs..." Elements of these "Keatonesque" qualities would appear in St. Clair’s work for the remainder of his career.

== Music ==
In 2016, the Dallas Chamber Symphony commissioned an original film score for The Goat from composer Jon Kull. The score premiered during a concert screening at Moody Performance Hall on February 16, 2016, with Richard McKay conducting.

== See also ==
- List of American films of 1921
- Buster Keaton filmography

== Bibliography ==
- Dwyer, Ruth Anne. 1996. Malcolm St. Clair: His Films, 1915–1948. The Scarecrow Press, Lantham, Md. and London. ISBN 0810827093
