= Neighbors (1920 film) =

1920 American Buster Keaton comedy film

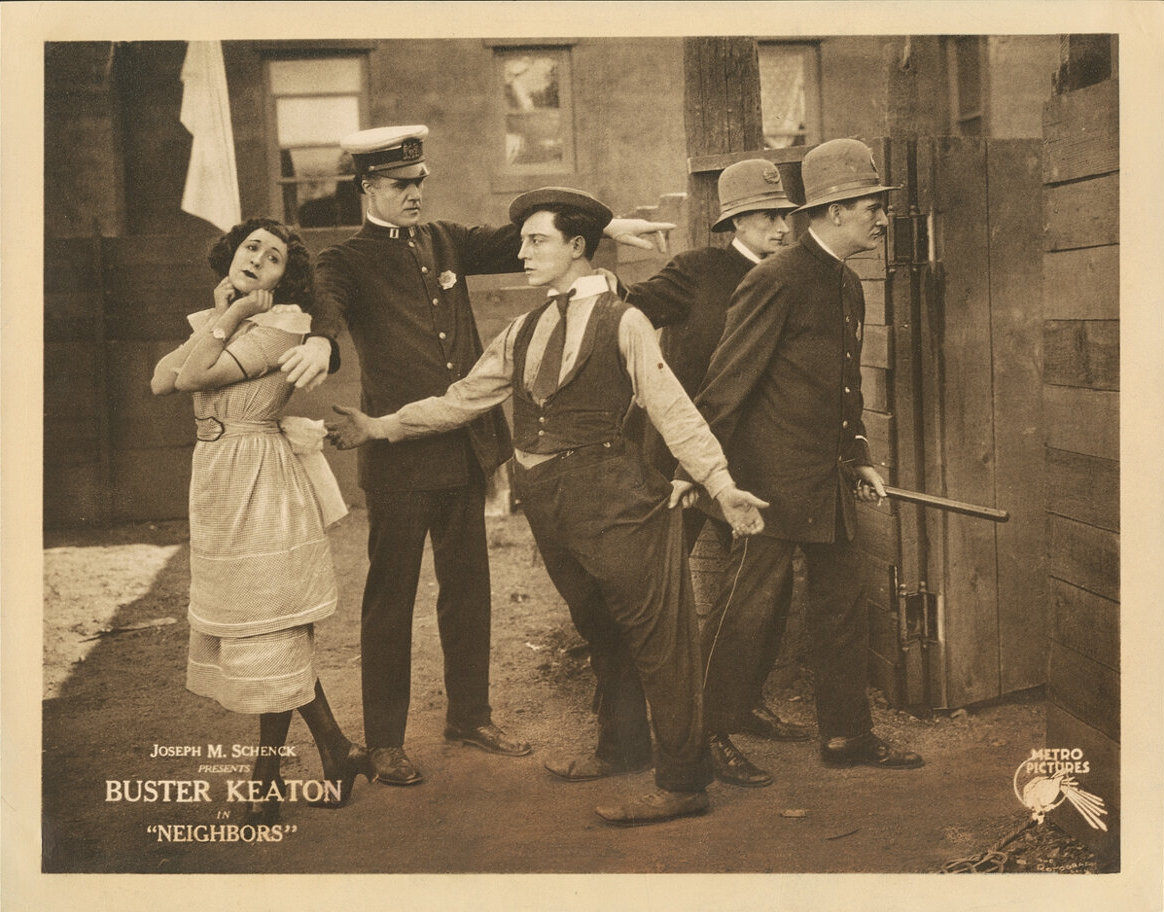
- Lobby card for the film
- Directed by: Edward F. Cline; Buster Keaton
- Written by: Edward F. Cline; Buster Keaton
- Produced by: Joseph M. Schenck
- Starring: Buster Keaton; Virginia Fox; Joe Roberts; Joe Keaton; Edward F. Cline; Jack Duffy
- Cinematography: Elgin Lessley
- Distributed by: Metro Pictures
- Release date: December 22, 1920
- Running time: 18 minutes
- Country: United States
- Languages: Silent films English intertitles

Neighbors is a 1920 two-reel silent comedy film co-written, co-directed by, and starring Buster Keaton.

== Plot ==
Neighbors (public domain, full short)

"The Boy" and "the Girl" are young lovers who live in tenements, the rear of which face each other, with backyards separated by a wooden fence. Their families constantly feud over the lovers' relationship. Each morning the Boy and the Girl exchange love letters through holes in the fence, much to the dismay of their families who insist they stay away from one another. The Boy sneaks into the Girl's bedroom window as the parents are arguing but he is caught by the Girl's father who ties him to a clothes line and slowly sends him back over to his family's house. After much arguing and fighting the two families eventually go to court to settle their differences. The Boy demands the right to marry the Girl, and the judge insists that the two families not interfere in their plans. On the day of the wedding the two families are naturally hostile to one another. After the wedding is delayed due to the Boy's belt repeatedly breaking and in his pants continuously falling down, the Girl's father discovers that the ring the Boy intends to give to her is a cheap 10-cent ring purchased from Woolworths. He angrily calls off the wedding and drags the Girl home. Determined to rescue his love and with the help of his two groomsmen, the Boy uses trapeze skills to snag the Girl and the two run off together. They slide down a chute into the Judge's coal cellar whereupon His Honor immediately pronounces them husband and wife.

== Cast ==
- Buster Keaton as The Boy
- Virginia Fox as The Girl
- Joe Roberts as The Girl's Father
- Joe Keaton as The Boy's Father
- Edward F. Cline as The Cop
- Jack Duffy as The Judge
- The Flying Escalantes as Themselves

== See also ==
- List of American films of 1920
- Buster Keaton filmography
