= The Haunted House (1921 film) =

1921 American silent comedy film

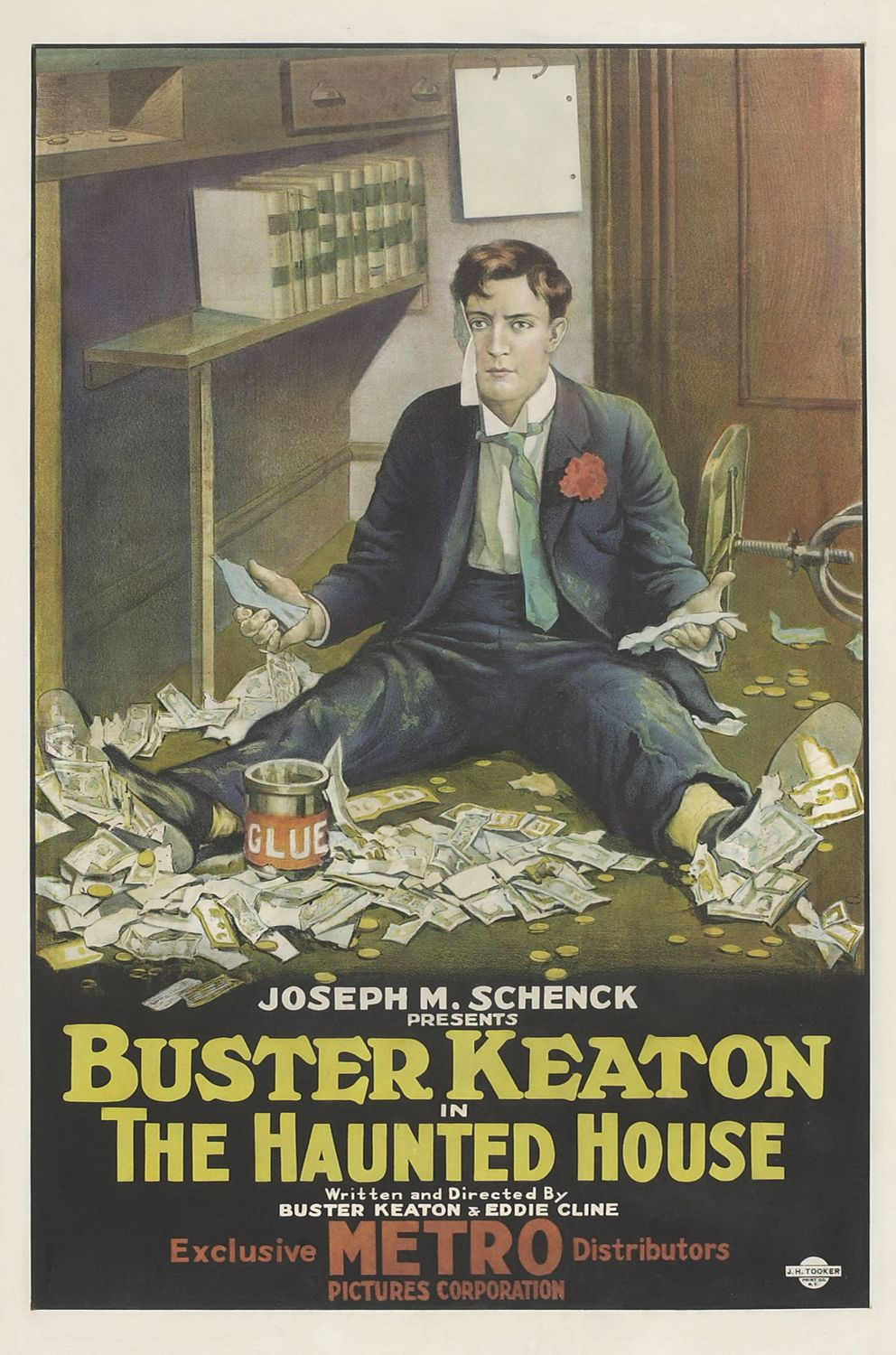
- Theatrical poster
- Directed by: Edward F. Cline; Buster Keaton
- Written by: Edward F. Cline; Buster Keaton
- Produced by: Joseph M. Schenck
- Starring: Buster Keaton; Virginia Fox; Joe Keaton; Joe Roberts; Edward F. Cline
- Cinematography: Elgin Lessley
- Distributed by: Metro Pictures
- Release date: February 10, 1921
- Running time: 21 minutes
- Country: United States
- Language: Silent (English intertitles)

The Haunted House

The Haunted House is a 1921 American two-reel silent comedy film starring Buster Keaton. It was written and directed by Keaton and Edward F. Cline. The film has a runtime of 21 minutes.

== Plot ==
Keaton plays a teller at a successful bank. Unbeknownst to him, the manager of the bank and his gang are planning on pulling off a robbery and hiding in an old house that they have rigged up with booby traps and effects to make it appear to be haunted. After a mishap that afternoon with Keaton getting glue all over the money and himself, he almost thwarts the gang's robbery, but when the owner of the bank walks in and sees Keaton armed with a gun, he assumes it was he who tried to rob it. Keaton flees and takes refuge in the old house; however, a troupe of actors from a theatre production are also in the house and are clad in their scary costumes (ghosts, skeletons, etc.), leading Keaton and the gang of robbers to believe the house actually is haunted. After Keaton has many encounters with the "ghosts" and the house's booby traps, he discovers the scam, and the manager is revealed as being behind the robbery. As the manager is about to be taken away, he hits Keaton over the head and knocks him out, before escaping. Next, we see Keaton being awoken by two angels at the foot of a large stairway, which he ascends all the way to Heaven. He asks Saint Peter to be let in but is denied and sent all the way down to Hell instead. However, this is all revealed to be a dream sequence, as Keaton regains consciousness in the house seconds later.

== Cast ==
- Buster Keaton as bank clerk
- Virginia Fox as bank president's daughter
- Joe Roberts as bank cashier
- Edward F. Cline as bank customer
- Dorothy Cassil as flirty bank customer (uncredited)
- Mark Hamilton as tallest ghost (uncredited)
- Natalie Talmadge as fainting female bank customer (uncredited)

== Legacy ==
Christopher Workman commented, "[The film] belongs to a different, more simplistic era of comedic storytelling. As such, it doesn't work too well today...[but] it has a certain amount of naive charm. Even in its day, there wasn't much original about it, given that haunted houses occupied by criminals had been a staple of the genre for nearly two decades already."

== See also ==
- List of American films of 1921
- Buster Keaton filmography
