= Day Dreams (1922 film) =

1922 film

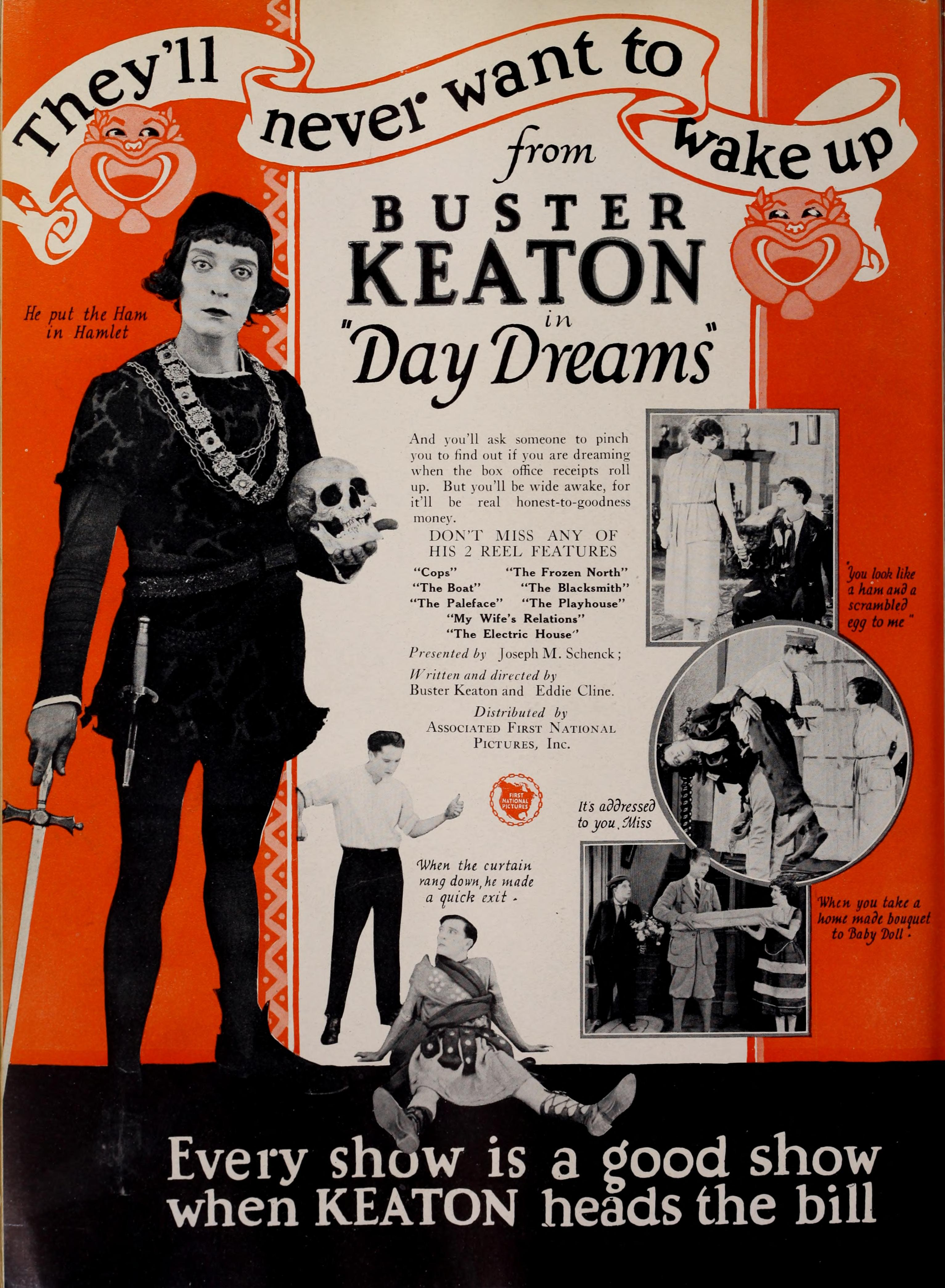
- Advertisement in Motion Picture News
- Directed by: Buster Keaton; Edward F. Cline
- Written by: Buster Keaton; Edward F. Cline; Roscoe 'Fatty' Arbuckle
- Produced by: Joseph M. Schenck
- Starring: Buster Keaton
- Cinematography: Elgin Lessley
- Distributed by: First National Pictures
- Release date: November 27, 1922
- Running time: 19 minutes (2-reels)
- Country: United States
- Languages: Silent; English intertitles

Day Dreams (also billed as Daydreams) is a 1922 American short comedy film directed by and featuring Buster Keaton. It is most famous for a scene where Keaton finds himself on the inside of a ferry boat paddle wheel. It is a partially lost film and available from public domain sources.

== Plot ==
Day Dreams (1922)

Buster wants to marry a girl, but her father disapproves. Therefore Keaton vows he will go the city and get a job, or commit suicide. He takes several jobs (janitor, employee in an animal hospital, street cleaner, extra in a theatrical play,...) which all disastrously go wrong. In the final scenes he gets stuck inside a ferry boat paddle wheel, where he has to run to get out of it. In the end he returns to his girlfriend's father, but since he failed in every way he is given a gun to shoot himself. Buster however manages to miss himself and is therefore kicked out the window by the girl's father.

== Cast ==
- Buster Keaton as The Young Man
- Renée Adorée as The Girl
- Edward F. Cline as The Theater Director (uncredited)
- Joe Keaton as The Girl's Father (uncredited)
- Joe Roberts as The Mayor (uncredited)

== Production ==
Filmed, in part, in San Francisco, Oakland, and Los Angeles.

== See also ==
- Buster Keaton filmography
