= Hard Luck (1921 film) =

1921 film

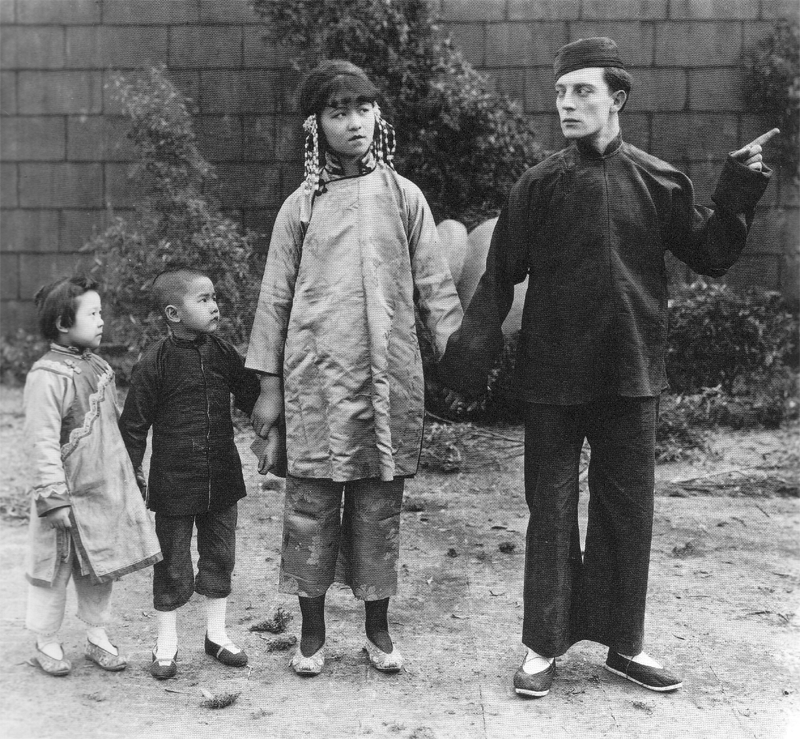
- Buster and his Chinese wife and children in the finale of the film.
- Directed by: Edward F. Cline; Buster Keaton
- Written by: Edward F. Cline; Buster Keaton
- Produced by: Joseph M. Schenck
- Starring: Buster Keaton; Virginia Fox; Joe Roberts; Bull Montana
- Cinematography: Elgin Lessley
- Edited by: Buster Keaton
- Distributed by: Metro Pictures
- Release date: March 14, 1921
- Running time: 22 minutes
- Country: United States
- Languages: Silent film English (original intertitles)

Hard Luck

Hard Luck is a 1921 American two-reel silent comedy film starring Buster Keaton, written and directed by Keaton and Edward F. Cline. It runs 22 minutes. For sixty years it was Keaton's only major lost film until it was partially reconstructed in 1987, with the critical final scene—which Keaton called the greatest laugh-getting scene of his career—still missing. It was later discovered in a Russian archive print, and now the full film is available.

== Plot ==
Buster plays a down-on-his-luck young man who decides to commit suicide after losing his job and his girl. After several inept attempts to end his life—and bolstered by whiskey disguised as poison—he joins an expedition to capture an armadillo. He finds himself becoming more confident through a series of adventures (such as fishing and fox hunting) as the film proceeds. But the confidence becomes his undoing as he misses the pool in a dive from a high board and hits the ground on the far side with such force that he disappears into a hole. Some years later, an Asian-garbed Buster climbs out of the hole beside the now dry and deserted pool followed by a Chinese wife and three young children.

== Cast ==
- Buster Keaton – Suicidal Boy
- Virginia Fox – Virginia
- Joe Roberts – Lizard Lip Luke
- Bull Montana – Virginia's husband (uncredited)

== See also ==
- Buster Keaton filmography
- List of American films of 1921
- List of rediscovered films

== Bibliography ==
- Keaton, Eleanor; Vance, Jeffrey (2001). Buster Keaton Remembered. Harry N. Abrams, Inc. ISBN 0810942275.
