= The Love Nest (1923 film) =

1923 film

Love Nest
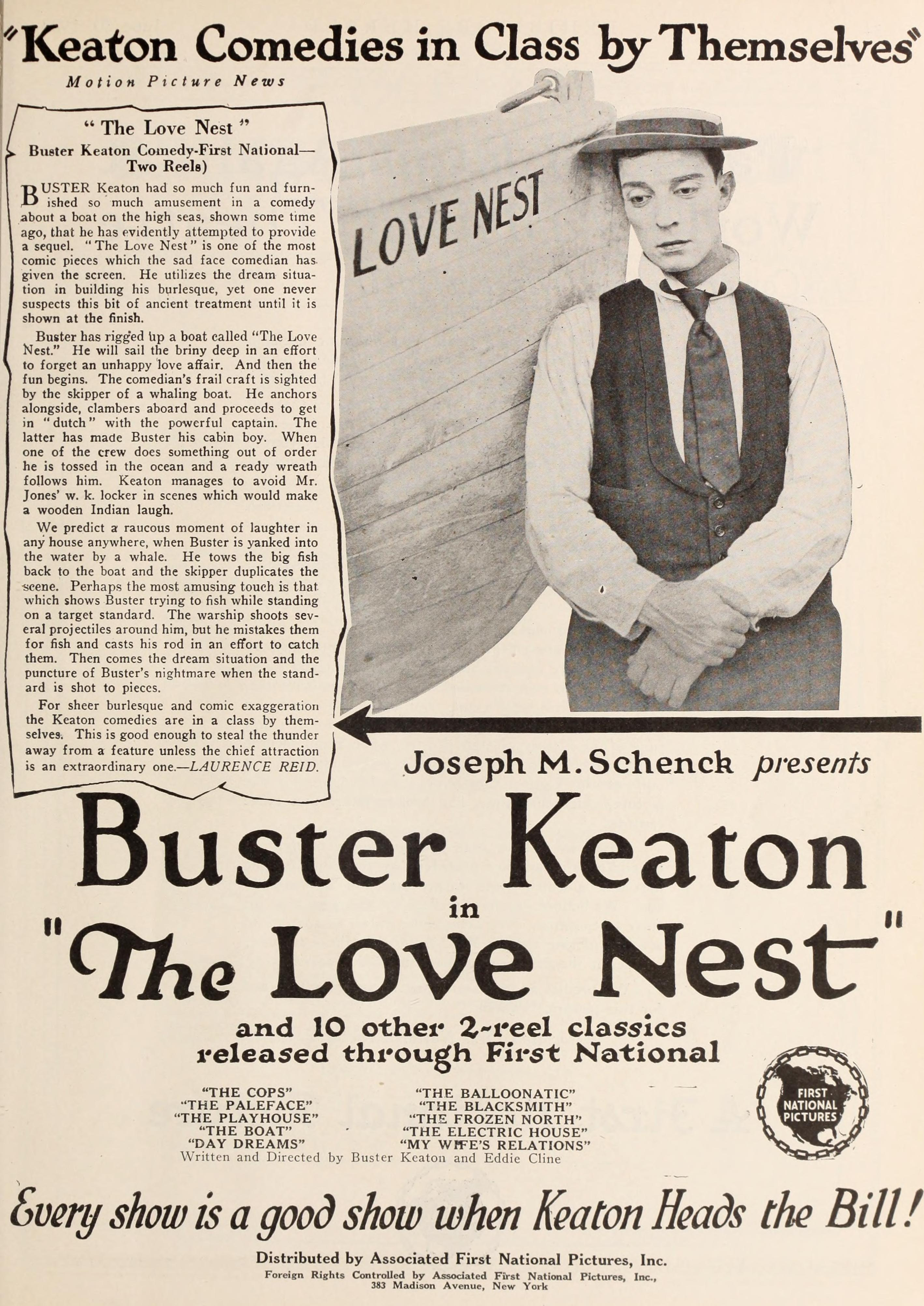
- Directed by: Edward F. Cline; Buster Keaton; Fred Gabourie
- Written by: Buster Keaton
- Produced by: Joseph M. Schenck
- Starring: Buster Keaton; Joe Roberts; Virginia Fox
- Cinematography: Elgin Lessley
- Edited by: Elgin Lessley
- Distributed by: First National Pictures Inc.
- Release date: March 1923
- Running time: 20 minutes
- Country: United States
- Language: Silent (English intertitles)

Love Nest is a 1923 American two-reel short comedy silent film written and directed by and starring Buster Keaton. It was the 19th and final short film produced at Buster Keaton Productions with First National Pictures before he moved on to feature-length pictures. It was popular in other countries, including France (Frigoet la baleine), Italy, (l nido d'amore), Spain (Nido de amor), Finland (Rakkaudenpesä) and Hungary (Szerelmifészek).

== Plot ==
Love Nest (1923) by Edward F. Cline and Buster Keaton

In order to escape from his life and his lost love, Keaton sets off on his small boat, Cupid, but runs into the whaling ship, The Love Nest. The whaler's merciless captain throws crew members overboard for even the slightest offense.

After his steward accidentally pours hot tea over the captain's hand, the captain tosses him overboard and replaces him with Keaton. Despite a series of mishaps, Keaton manages to avoid the fate of other crewmen.

But Keaton desires to escape, and chops a hole in the hull to sink the boat. He escapes in a lifeboat with no idea where land is.

He docks at the rear of a platform he is unaware is a target bullseye for naval gunnery practice. The Navy scores a direct hit and Keaton is seen hurtled skyward; angel-wing style.

Keaton then wakes up in his own boat; which had never left the dock. The whole thing had been a dream.

Here is the description from the Library of Congress copyright filing:

At evening, on a hill-top overlooking the bay, the lovers parted. They had been engaged, but she returned the ring, so he decided not to get married.

In his sorrow he planned a trip around the world, and the next day our hero loads his thirty-foot, one lunged power boat with hard-tack, water and gasoline. In a few days he has accomplished nothing more than a beard; and the provisions are gone. He lays down on his bunk to die, but instead gets involved with the skipper of a whaling boat, "The Love Nest". Aboard this boat human life is shorter than bobbed hair on a flea.

Buster makes a good impression on the captain -- and when the cabin-boy gets thrown over the side of the boat for spilling coffee on the floor of the captain's cabin, Buster gets the job -- or rather the offer of the job as cabin-boy to the captain. Buster hasn't the nerve to refuse and accepts the proposition.

One of his first jobs is swabbing the deck, and he mistakes the open ventilator to the captain's cabin for a convenient way of disposing of the bucket of water. The captain gets the bucket of water on his lap, and comes up on deck looking for someone to throw off the boat. Buster's luck plays with him. The captain accuses another man of dropping the water through the ventilator, and Buster watches number two of the crew get flung over the railing of the quarterdeck. The captain has a stock of wreaths, and every time a man goes over the side of the ship, the captain shoots a wreath after him. Buster looks through the wreath stock to pick a good one for himself.

After two or three occasions on which Buster nearly wins wreaths for himself, the lookout of the boat spies a whale, and the harpoon gun is unlimbered. Buster is given the end of the harpoon rope to make fast to a deck capstan, but he gets the brilliant idea of holding the rope in his hand. The next thing Buster discovers he is cutting through the ocean in the wake of a very playful fish of house-boat dimensions. Buster manages to get back on board, still holding the rope, and finds the skipper waiting to greet him with a gun. Buster hands the skipper the rope he has been holding. The skipper no sooner gets the rope than the whale indicates a desire to be off and away, by jerking suddenly on the rope. The skipper leaves the boat like water through a lee scupper, and Buster immediately announces himself master of the ship. The crew is just about to believe him, when the skipper returns, and then it's every man for himself.

— Buster Keaton, author of the scenario

== Cast ==
- Buster Keaton - Buster Keaton
- Joe Roberts - Captain of the Whaler
- Virginia Fox - The Girl
- Steve Murphy as Member of Ship's Crew

== See also ==
- List of American films of 1923
- Buster Keaton filmography
- List of United States comedy films
