= My Wife's Relations =

1922 film

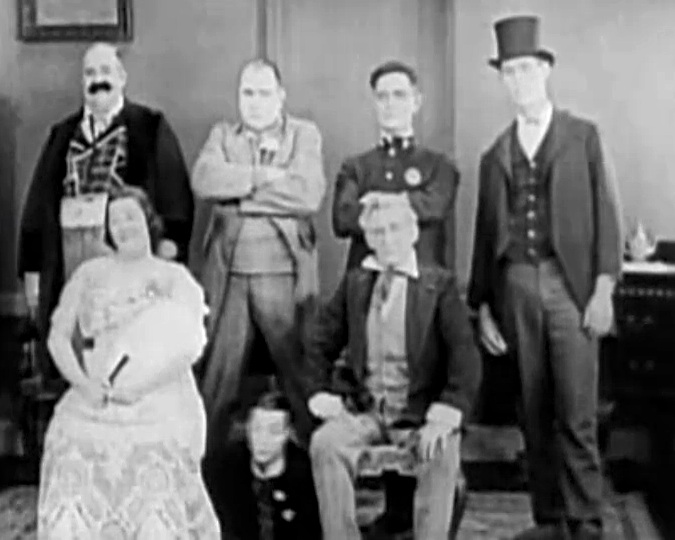
- Directed by: Buster Keaton; Edward F. Cline
- Written by: Buster Keaton; Edward F. Cline
- Produced by: Joseph M. Schenck
- Starring: Buster Keaton
- Cinematography: Elgin Lessley
- Release date: May 6, 1922
- Running time: 22 minutes
- Country: United States
- Language: Silent (English intertitles)

My Wife's Relations (1922) by Buster Keaton and Edward F. Cline

My Wife's Relations is a 1922 American short comedy film directed by and starring Buster Keaton.

== Plot ==
Through a judicial error Buster finds himself married to a large domineering woman, with an unfriendly father and four bullying brothers.

== Cast ==
- Buster Keaton as The Husband
- Monte Collins as The Father (uncredited)
- Wheezer Dell as Brother (uncredited)
- Harry Madison as Brother (uncredited)
- Kate Price as Wife (uncredited)
- Joe Roberts as Brother (uncredited)
- Tom Wilson as Brother (uncredited)

== See also ==
- Buster Keaton filmography
