= Convict 13 =

1920 film by Buster Keaton, Edward F. Cline

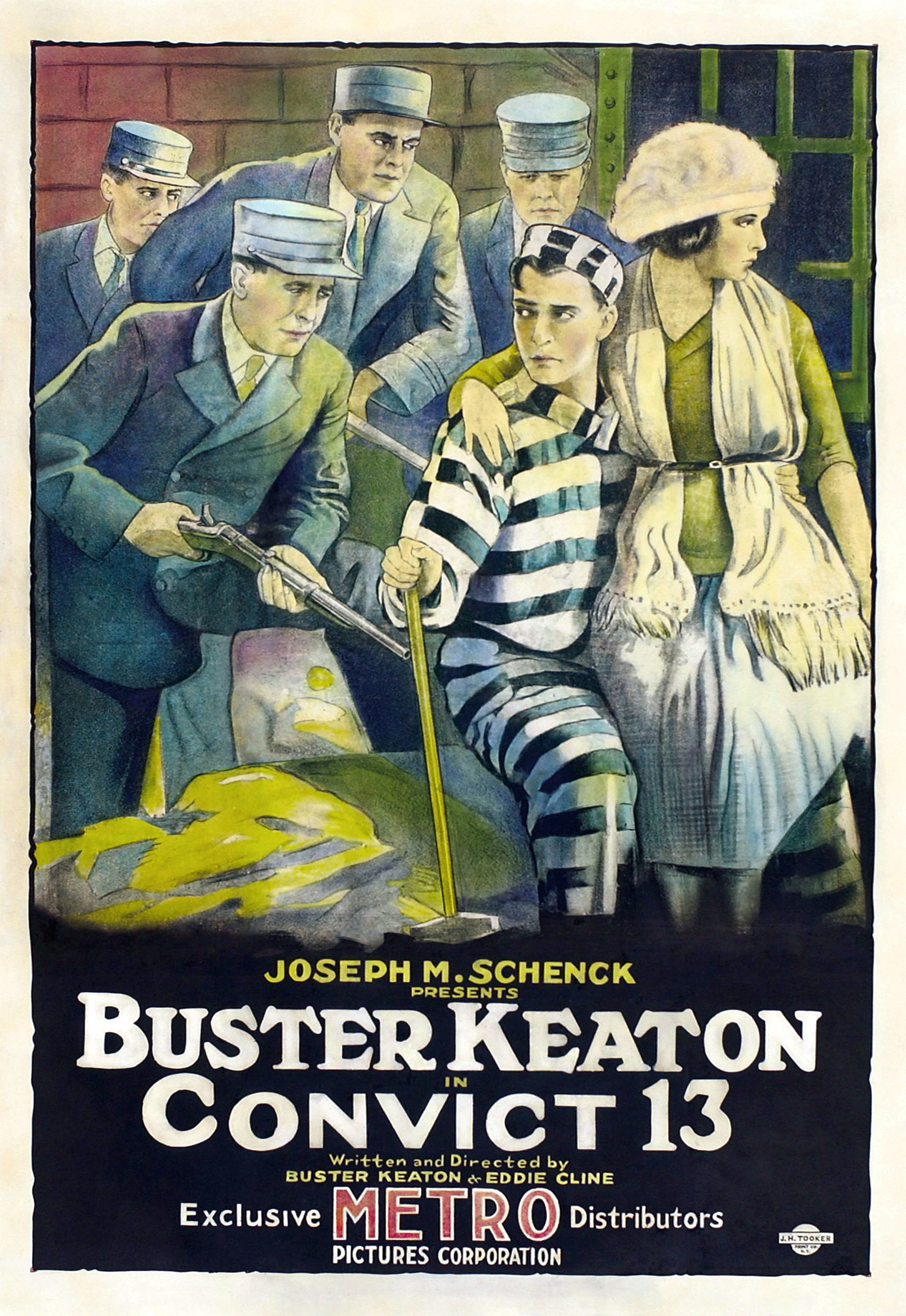
- Theatrical poster for Convict 13 (1920)
- Directed by: Edward F. Cline; Buster Keaton
- Written by: Edward F. Cline; Buster Keaton
- Produced by: Joseph M. Schenck
- Starring: Buster Keaton; Sybil Seely; Joe Roberts; Edward F. Cline; Joe Keaton; Louise Keaton
- Cinematography: Elgin Lessley
- Edited by: Buster Keaton
- Distributed by: Metro Pictures
- Release date: October 27, 1920
- Running time: 20 minutes
- Country: United States
- Languages: Silent film English intertitles

Convict 13 is a 1920 two-reel silent comedy film starring Buster Keaton. It was written and directed by Keaton and Edward F. Cline.

== Plot ==
Convict 13

Buster plays golf one morning with a group of friends and after a disastrous start, drives his ball into a river but retrieves it after it is swallowed by a fish. Meanwhile a convict escapes from a nearby prison and makes his way to the golf course, as the prison guards give chase. Buster's ball is stolen by a dog and while he is retrieving it, he accidentally knocks himself out after the ball ricochets off of a shed. While he is unconscious, the prisoner switches clothes with him. The guards give chase and Buster attempts to escape by jumping into a passing car but it belongs to the prison warden and he is taken to jail.

From the prisoner number on Buster's clothes, he realizes that he is Convict 13 who is scheduled to be hanged that morning. Luckily Buster's girlfriend replaces the hangman's noose with a long elastic rope so that Buster bounces several times after the trapdoor is opened and survives. Buster is sent to smash rocks with a sledgehammer, where he accidentally knocks out a prison guard and steals his uniform in order to escape. At the same time a rowdy prisoner revolts in the prison yard and knocks out each of the guards one by one. Buster stumbles into the prisoner's path whilst escaping and the prisoner believes him to be another guard. Buster escapes the prisoner by locking a gate leading into another yard but the prisoner bends the bars of the gate and pursues Buster to the gallows, where Buster restrains him by tying him up using the elasticated noose used on him earlier.

Buster is "promoted" to Assistant Warden for his bravery but the now furious prisoner instigates a riot, then knocks out Buster, kidnaps his girlfriend and takes her out to the yard where the other prisoners have overpowered the guards. Buster recovers and using a punching bag which he attaches to the elasticated rope, knocks out all of the rioting prisoners by swinging it around his head as they run around the yard. Buster celebrates but he accidentally knocks himself out when he leans on a sledgehammer. However the scene then cuts back to Buster lying outside the shed at the golf course where he first knocked himself out, being woken up by his girlfriend - the events in the prison revealed to have been a dream.

== Cast ==
- Buster Keaton as Golfer Turned Prisoner, Guard
- Sybil Seely as Socialite, Warden's Daughter
- Joe Roberts as The Crazed Prisoner
- Edward F. Cline as Hangman
- Joe Keaton as Prisoner
- Louise Keaton

== Production ==
In the film, Buster performs one of the most dangerous sight gags that he performed in vaudeville. In the words of Marie Dressler: "Buster would stand on a table in back of his father twirling a basketball tied to the end of a rope, while his father was trying to shave himself with a straight razor. And that ball kept getting closer and closer, all the sudden, BANG!"

== See also ==
- List of American films of 1920
- Buster Keaton filmography
