= Virginia Fox =

American silent films actress in 1910s and 1920s

Virginia Foxx
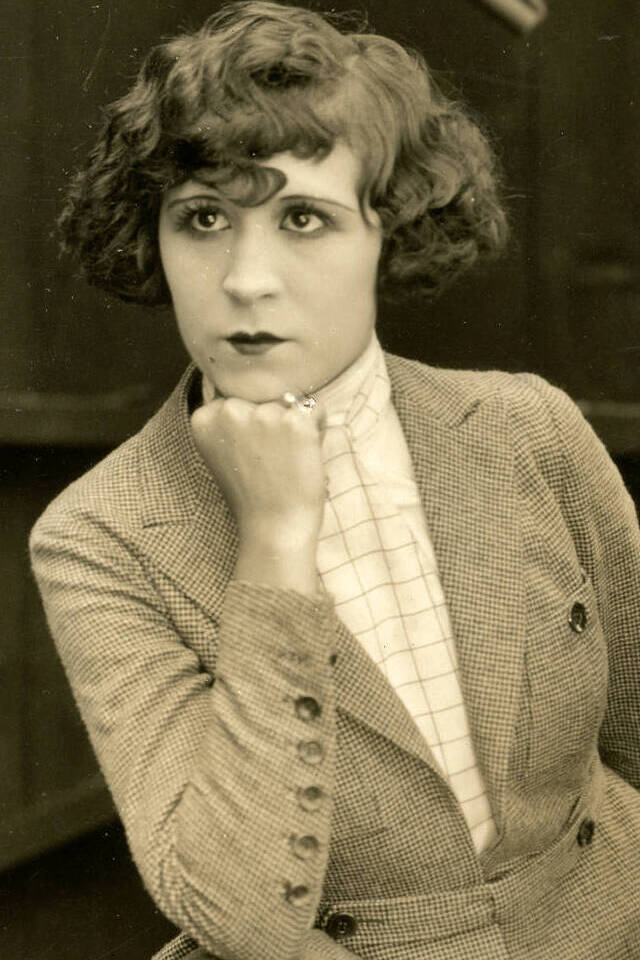
- Fox in The Blacksmith (1922)
- Born: Virginia Oglesby Fox; April 19, c. 1899–1906 (Note: The year of her birth is unknown as birth records in West Virginia were not mandated until 1917. It has been listed as 1899 or 1902 or 1903 or 1906 (as indicated on her tombstone). The 1910 Census states she was 9 years old when it was taken on April 15, 1910.); Wheeling, West Virginia, U.S.
- Died: October 14, 1982; Santa Monica, California, U.S.
- Resting place: Westwood Village Memorial Park Cemetery, Los Angeles
- Occupation: Actress
- Years active: 1915–1929
- Spouse: Darryl F. Zanuck (m. 1924; died 1979)
- Children: 3, including Richard D. Zanuck
- Relatives: Dean Zanuck (grandson)

Virginia Oglesby Zanuck (/ˈzænək/ ZAN-ək; née Fox; April 19 [year of birth disputed] – October 14, 1982) was an American actress who starred in many silent films of the 1910s and 1920s.

== Life and career ==
Fox was born as Virginia Oglesby Fox in Wheeling, West Virginia (though her grave erroneously lists Charleston as her place of birth), the daughter of Mary Elizabeth (née Oglesby) and Frederick Fox.

While on vacation from boarding school, Fox traveled to visit a friend in Los Angeles. The two made a casual stop by the studio of Mack Sennett, where she was hired on the spot and made a bathing beauty in the studio's films. She went on to star as leading lady in many of the early films of Buster Keaton, including 1920's highly regarded Neighbors.

On January 12, 1924, she married film producer Darryl F. Zanuck, with whom she had three children, Darrylin, Susan Marie, and Richard Darryl. Fox retired from acting but was known as a behind-the-scenes influence on her husband's business decisions. The couple separated in 1956 over the studio mogul's affairs with other women, although they never legally divorced. According to Zanuck biographers, she cared for him at their home from the time he became mentally incapacitated in the early 1970s until his death in 1979.

Despite some Internet accounts to the contrary, Virginia Fox was not related to William Fox, whose name was used by 20th Century Fox and continues to be used in the trademarks of the present-day Fox Corporation. William Fox founded Fox Studios in 1914 but had lost control of it by the time Zanuck acquired it and merged it with his 20th Century Pictures in 1935.

== Death ==
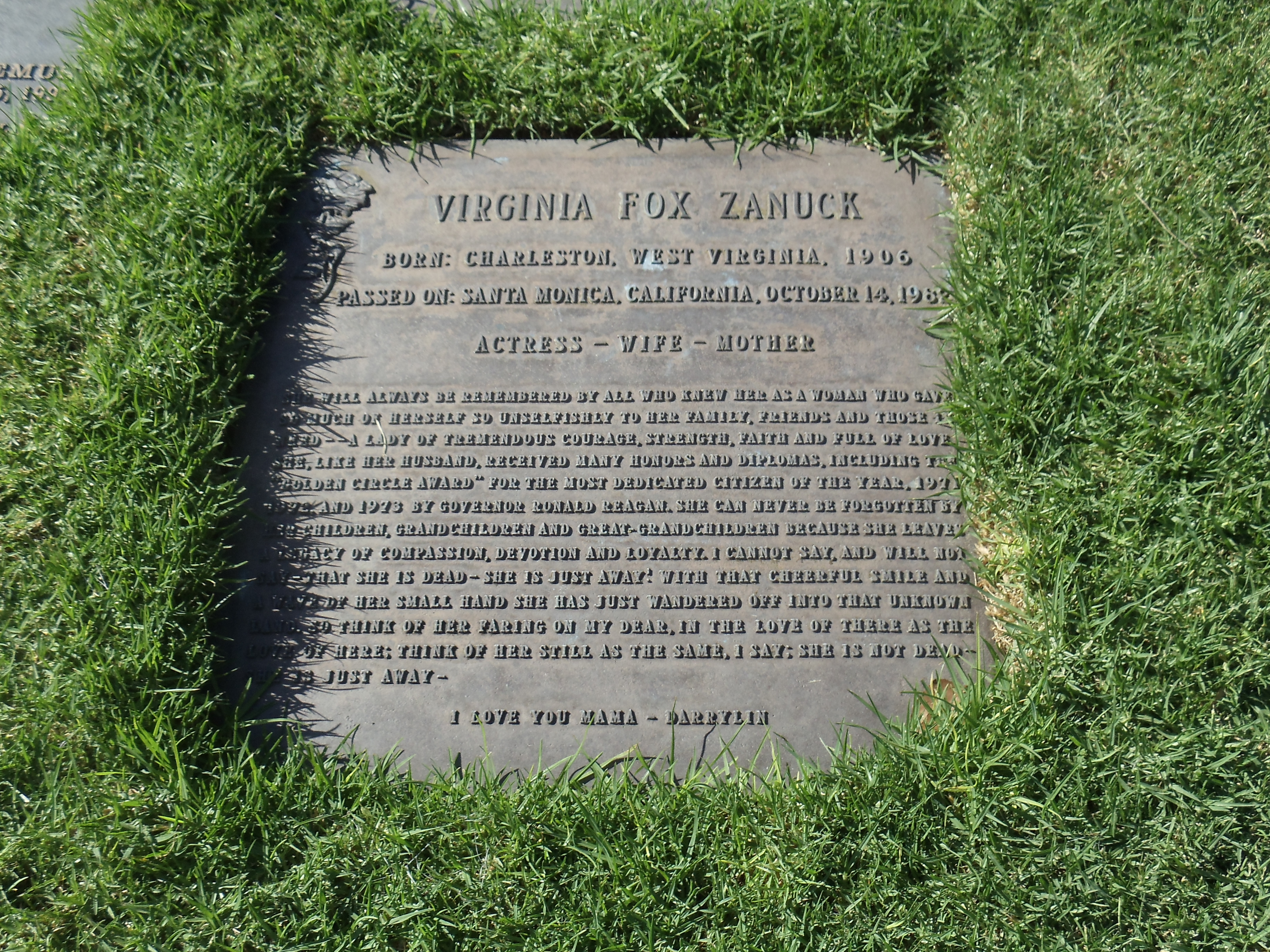
Virginia Fox Zanuck's tomb in Westwood Memorial Park, Westwood, Los Angeles, California

On October 14, 1982, Fox died of a lung infection complicated by emphysema at her home in Santa Monica, California after having been sick for about a year. She was buried near Darryl Zanuck at the Westwood Village Memorial Park Cemetery in Westwood, Los Angeles.

== Filmography ==
Year	Film	Role	Notes
1915	A Submarine Pirate		
1920	Down on the Farm	uncredited	
1920	Neighbors	The Bride	
1921	The Haunted House	Bank President's Daughter	
1921	Hard Luck	Virginia	
1921	The Goat	Chief's daughter	
1921	The Playhouse	Twin	Uncredited
1922	The Paleface	Indian Maiden	Uncredited
1922	Cops	Mayor's Daughter	
1922	The Blacksmith	Horsewoman	
1922	The Electric House	Girl	Uncredited
1923	The Love Nest	The Girl	
1926	The Caveman	Party Girl	
