= The Frozen North =

1922 film

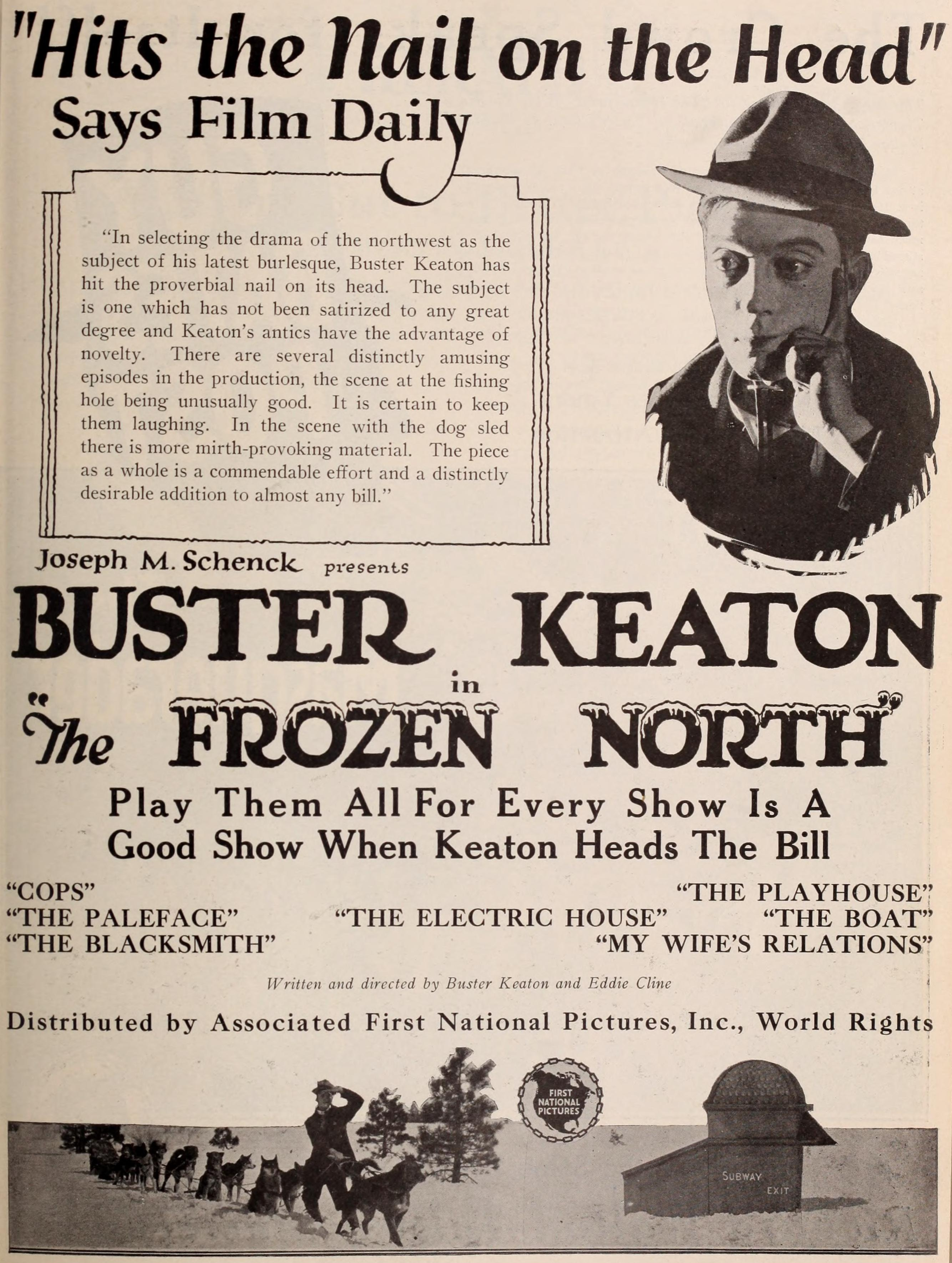
- Advertisement for the film from Exhibitors Herald
- Directed by: Buster Keaton; Edward F. Cline
- Written by: Buster Keaton; Edward F. Cline
- Produced by: Joseph M. Schenck
- Starring: Buster Keaton
- Cinematography: Elgin Lessley
- Release date: August 28, 1922
- Running time: 17 minutes
- Country: United States
- Language: Silent with English intertitles

Frozen North

The Frozen North is a 1922 American short comedy film directed by and starring Buster Keaton. The film is a parody of early western films, especially those of William S. Hart. The film was written by Keaton and Edward F. Cline (credited as Eddie Cline). The film runs for around 17 minutes. Marion Harlan and Bonnie Hill co-star in the film.

== Plot ==
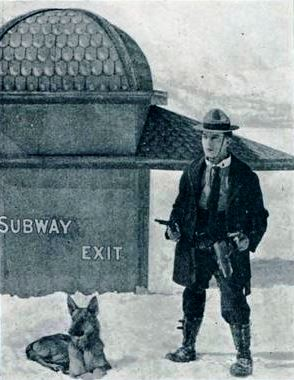
Buster Keaton in The Frozen North (1922)

The film opens near the "last stop", a subway terminal emerging from deep snow in the middle of nowhere. A cowboy emerges, arriving at a small settlement where people gamble in a saloon. He tries to rob them by scaring them with a cutout of a man holding a gun, which he places at the window to appear as if he has an accomplice. Frightened, the gamblers hand over their cash, but soon find out the truth when a drunk man examines the cutout and tips it over. Keaton attempts to return the cash, but is thrown through a window.

Next, he mistakenly enters a house thinking it is his own. From behind, he sees a man and a woman kissing. Thinking the woman is his wife, he begins to cry and shoots the couple, only to realize his mistake, whereupon he makes his exit. He goes to his own house, where he finds his wife, whom he spurns coldly. A vase drops on her head and knocks her unconscious; Keaton glances at her momentarily without interest. A passing policeman hears Keaton's wife scream and knocks at the door. Keaton saves himself from arrest, playing music on a gramophone and pretending to dance with his unconscious wife as if all were normal.

Looking out a window, he sees his pretty neighbor. He quickly dons an elegant suit and picks flowers in an attempt to woo her, but she doesn't favor him. Her husband comes back inside to get something he forgot, and angrily takes his wife away after finding Keaton inside the house with her.

The neighbors leave on a dogsled. Keaton gets a "car" driven by a friend (Joe Roberts) to follow them, but it breaks down, so he must hail a passing taxi (a horse drawn sleigh). The taxi is stopped by a traffic warden (riding a classic Harley-Davidson motorcycle frame mounted on skis driven by a pusher propeller), but they get away. Keaton is up to his old tricks—he flips the propeller around to reverse the thrust, so the officer goes backward into a lake when he restarts his engine to chase them. Three miles north of North Pole, Keaton and Roberts find a hotel-like igloo. They attempt to survive by fishing in the manner of the Eskimos, but fail when Keaton instead catches a fellow fisherman and his meager catch is eaten by a bear.

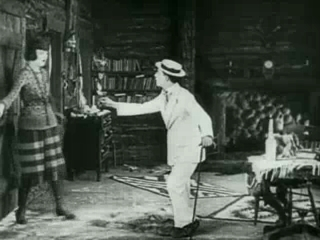
Keaton offers flowers to his pretty neighbor (Bonnie Hill).

Forced to flee back to the igloo, Keaton sees his pretty neighbor again in her new hut. Apparently fortified by drinking a bottle of cola, he decides he will make another attempt to win the other woman. He enters her hut to her distress. Upon hearing her husband returning, Keaton resolutely bars the door with his arm, only to discover the door hinges on the other side. After jumping and falling out the window, he disguises himself as a snowman to elude the husband, and returns to the hut, where he is momentarily shown dressed as Erich von Stroheim's character from the film Foolish Wives, to indicate his villainous intent. The husband returns to find his wife weeping on the floor as Keaton stands over her. He pulls out his own knife, and wrestles with Keaton. Keaton's wife appears outside the window, and shoots her husband in the back as they struggle. As husband and wife embrace, the wounded Keaton takes a derringer from his pocket and points it at the husband, but at that moment a janitor wakes up Keaton, who realizes that it was all a dream.

== Cast ==
- Buster Keaton as The Bad Man
- Joe Roberts as The Driver
- Marion Harlan as Wife
- Bonnie Hill as The Pretty Neighbor
- Freeman Wood as Her Husband
- Edward F. Cline as The Janitor

== Production ==
The film followed Roscoe Arbuckle's arrest for the rape and manslaughter of actress Virginia Rappe. While studio executives ordered Arbuckle's industry friends and fellow actors (whose careers they controlled) not to publicly speak up for him, Keaton did make a public statement in support of Arbuckle's innocence. However, William S. Hart, who had never met or worked with Arbuckle, made a number of damaging public statements in which he presumed that Arbuckle was guilty. Arbuckle later wrote a premise for a film parodying Hart as a thief, bully and wife beater which Keaton purchased from him. Hart was widely believed in the industry to be "prone to domestic violence" and Keaton believed that Hart was helping to convict Arbuckle. Keaton produced, directed and starred in The Frozen North, the film that resulted.

Keaton wears a small version of Hart's campaign hat from the Spanish–American War and a six-shooter on each thigh, and during the scene in which he shoots the neighbor and her husband, he reacts with thick glycerin tears, a trademark of Hart's. Keaton spoofs Hart's demeanor, and comically attempts Hart's iconic one handed cigarette roll. Keaton spends a lot of time standing and staring to imply Hart's wooden acting, which is reinforced in the scene where he puts a picture of a cowboy in a doorway to dupe gamblers, and the image on the picture is Hart. Audiences of the 1920s recognized the parody and thought the film hysterically funny. However, Hart himself was not amused by Keaton's antics, particularly the crying scene, and did not speak to Keaton for two years after he had seen the film. The comedy also briefly parodies Erich von Stroheim's womanizing character from the film Foolish Wives. In contrast to Hart, von Stroheim was delighted with the parody of his character.

The film was photographed on location at Donner Lake outside Truckee, California, in mid-winter. The film's opening intertitles give it its mock-serious tone, and are taken from The Shooting of Dan McGrew by Robert W. Service.

Many of the gag sequences from The Frozen North, including the fishing sequence and wearing guitars as snowshoes while carrying a mattress, were later used by The Three Stooges in Rockin' thru the Rockies.

The gag of a protagonist being in a film in a dream sequence and waking up in the end is also in the film Sherlock Jr..

== See also ==
- Buster Keaton filmography
