= Edward F. Cline =

American actor and director

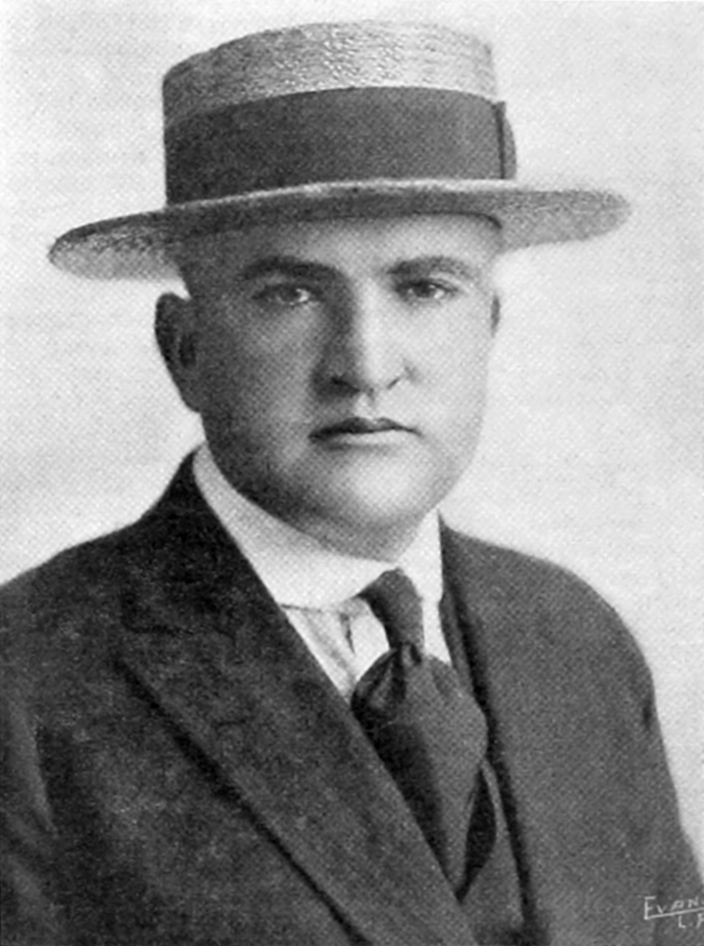
- Motion Picture News, 1920
- Born: Edward Francis Cline; November 4, 1891; Kenosha, Wisconsin, U.S.
- Died: May 22, 1961 (aged 69); Hollywood, California, U.S.
- Occupations: Film director, screenwriter, actor

Edward Francis Cline, usually credited as Edward F. Cline or Eddie Cline (November 4, 1891 – May 22, 1961), was an American screenwriter, actor, writer and director best known for his work with comedians W.C. Fields, Buster Keaton, and Olsen and Johnson. He was born in Kenosha, Wisconsin and died in Hollywood, California.

== Career ==
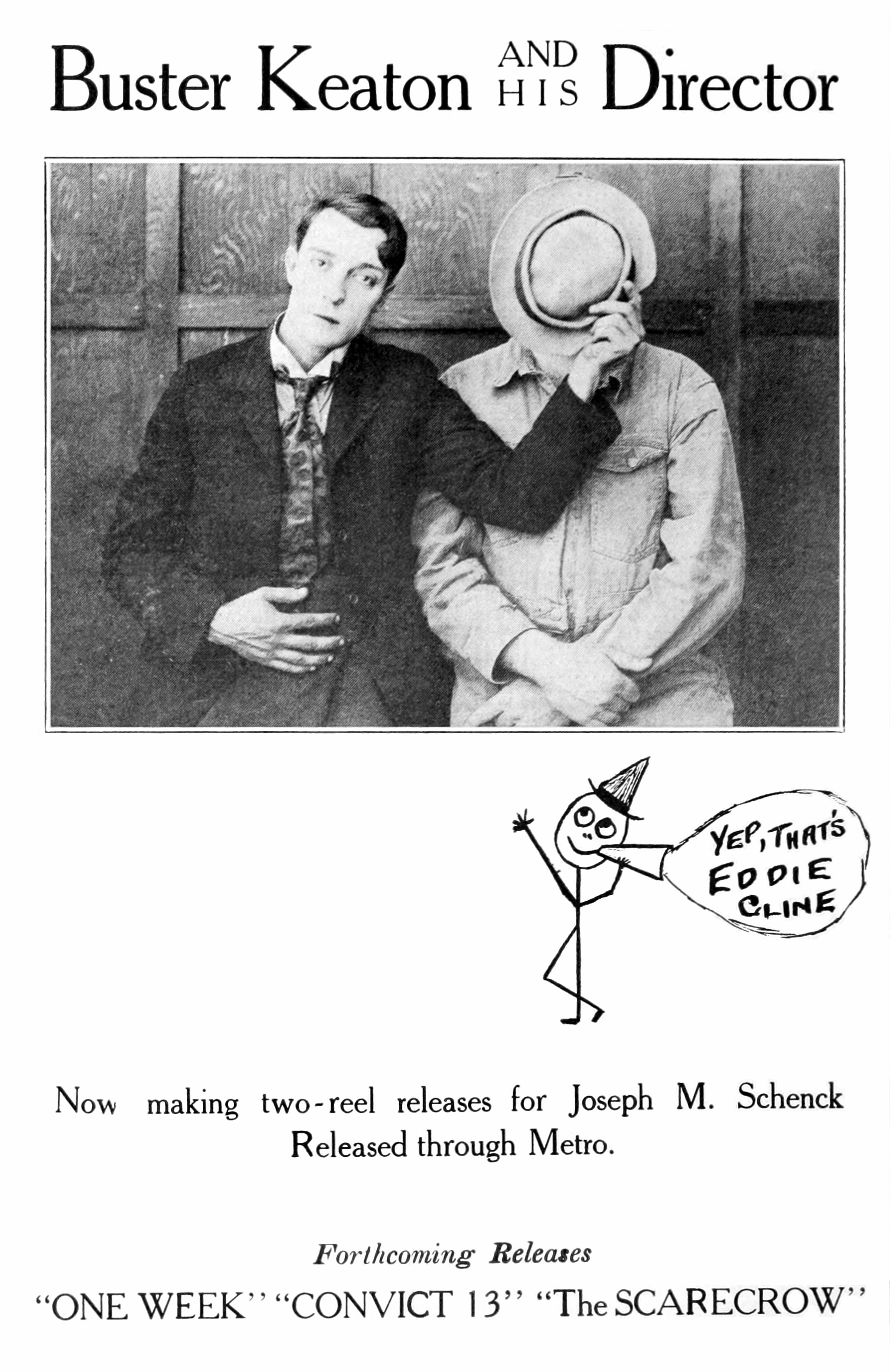
Buster Keaton and Eddie Cline in a 1920 advertisement

Cline began working for Mack Sennett's Keystone Studios in 1914 and supported Charlie Chaplin in some of the shorts he made at the studio. At one time he claimed credit for having come up with the idea for the Sennett Bathing Beauties. When Buster Keaton began making his own shorts, after having worked with Roscoe "Fatty" Arbuckle for years, he hired Cline as his co-director. In Keaton's short films Cline and Keaton himself were the only two regular gag men. For Keaton's 1921 short Hard Luck, Cline is credited with originating Keaton's personal favorite gag from his films. At the end of the film, Keaton attempts to dive into a swimming pool but overshoots it. Years later, he emerges from the hole which his fall created, accompanied by a Chinese wife and two small Chinese-American children. Besides working on most of Keaton's early shorts, Cline co-directed Keaton's first feature, Three Ages (1923).

Although he worked mostly in comedy, Cline directed some melodramas and the musical Leathernecking (1930), Irene Dunne's film debut.

Cline began his association with W.C. Fields in the 1932 Paramount film Million Dollar Legs. The film had several veterans of Mack Sennett's Keystone films, including Andy Clyde, Ben Turpin, and Hank Mann. Producer Herman J. Mankiewicz recalled of Cline, "He was very much of the old, old comedy school. He didn't know what was happening in Million Dollar Legs. At all. But he enjoyed doing it, because he had Andy Clyde. And Ben Turpin. And Bill Fields."

At RKO Radio Pictures, Cline directed the Wheeler and Woolsey comedies off and on between 1930 and 1937, as well as features starring comedians ZaSu Pitts or Joe Penner. Independent producer Sol Lesser also employed him frequently for action and musical fare, including Lesser's George O'Brien westerns and Bobby Breen features.

== W. C. Fields and Universal ==
During the troubled filming of W. C. Fields's You Can't Cheat an Honest Man (1939), largely resulting from Fields's clashes with director George Marshall, Fields managed to put Cline in the director's chair. Co-star Constance Moore remembered "Before Mr. Fields did the famous ping-pong scene he wanted Mr. Cline. He said 'I've worked with Cline. He knows my work.' He first put out his feelers. Then he started asking for Cline. Then he demanded him." Cline's work on the film lasted 10 days, during which he shot the party scene containing the ping-pong game. Cline was then placed in charge of all of Universal's W. C. Fields comedies.

As director of My Little Chickadee (1940), Cline's desire that the actors follow the script caused some difficulties with Fields until Cline finally submitted to Fields's tendency to ad-lib. Cline objected to the ad-libbing because it caused the crew to laugh, and Cline's own laughter necessitated a quick cut at the end of one of Fields's barroom scenes. Cline and Fields then made The Bank Dick (1940). Recalling their work together, Cline said that Fields chose him to direct his films because he was the only person in Hollywood who knew "less about making movies" than Fields himself. Assistant director Edward Montagne remembered, "Fields and Cline were basically the same type. They both had great comedy sense... With actors, if he thought they were on the right track, he'd let them go."

Cline's last collaboration with Fields was Never Give a Sucker an Even Break (1941). "Fields's frequent detours would baffle his director, Eddie Cline," according to co-star Gloria Jean's biographers. Gloria recalled:

Eddie Cline would have fights with him. He'd say, "Why did you do that? "'Cause I felt like it." "I know, but that wasn't in the script." "Well, we'll look at it later." They were constantly bickering back and forth. Yet Eddie Cline felt that he knew Fields so well that it didn't surprise him that much. They were always together, always laughing."

Universal Pictures, which had hired Cline to direct Fields, released Fields in 1941 but retained Cline, who went on to direct many of the studio's musical comedies, starring The Andrews Sisters, Gloria Jean, The Ritz Brothers, and Olsen and Johnson, among others.

In 1944, Cline directed Olsen and Johnson in Laffing Room Only, a vaudeville revue at the Winter Garden Theatre on Broadway.

In 1945, J. Arthur Rank purchased an interest in the Universal studio, and tried to merge it with his own British studio. The new regime did away with Universal's lower-budgeted comedies, musicals, mysteries, westerns, and serials, and dozens of employees were dismissed, including Cline.

He moved over to Monogram Pictures, directing and/or writing the studio's Jiggs and Maggie film series until 1950, when starring player Joe Yule died. Cline's last screen credit was Jiggs and Maggie Out West (1950).

In 1947, Cline directed a second Broadway production, Heads or Tails at the Cort Theatre.

== Television ==
Eddie Cline became a pioneer in television in 1949, when Olsen and Johnson approached him to stage its NBC network revue Fireball Fun for All, which was then struggling. It was an ambitious and complex production; the show featured many of the comedy team's trademark visual gags and effects, including specially engineered props requiring precise timing. Unfortunately the small television screens of the day could not fully capture the large-scale Olsen and Johnson bedlam, and the live broadcasts did not allow for editing out any awkward mishaps and problems. Cline lent valuable assistance but too late to save the series; the show left the air after only three months, with Cline directing the last five episodes under supervising director Ezra Stone.

Cline's old crony Buster Keaton became interested in television, and was one of the first movie comedians to succeed in the new medium. Keaton and Cline collaborated on two of Keaton's series.

Comic bandleader Spike Jones was famous for using wild visual gags in his band's performances, and his television show required even more material. Jones found an ideal resource in Eddie Cline, whose knack for comedy (and long memory for old sight gags) made him a valuable assistant. Cline remained in Jones's employ well into the 1950s.

== Personal life ==
In 1913, Cline became engaged to Minnie Elizabeth Matheis, aged 18, who previously had been engaged three times in three months. They married on March 6, 1916. In 1918, they had a daughter, named Elizabeth Normand; Minnie contracted an infection in childbirth and died four days later.

In 1919, Cline married Beatrice Altman. They had no children. She died in 1949.

Cline died of cirrhosis in 1961.

== In popular culture ==
A character in The X-Files episode "Clyde Bruckman's Final Repose", Detective Cline, is named after him.

== Partial filmography ==
Cline is credited as director unless noted. He directed nearly 60 Mack Sennett comedies between 1914 and 1933.

Year	Title	Notes
1914	The Rounders	Short film; actor only
1916	His Bread and Butter	Short film
1920	One Week	Short film; also screenwriter
1920	Convict 13	Short film; also screenwriter, actor
1920	Neighbors	Short film; also screenwriter and actor
1920	The Scarecrow	Short film; also screenwriter
1921	The Haunted House	Short film; also screenwriter and actor
1921	Hard Luck	Short film; also screenwriter
1921	The High Sign	Short film; also screenwriter
1921	The Goat	Short film; actor only
1921	The Playhouse	Short film; also screenwriter and actor
1921	The Boat	Short film; also screenwriter and actor
1922	The Paleface	Short film; also screenwriter
1922	Cops	Short film; also screenwriter and actor
1922	My Wife's Relations	Short film; also screenwriter and actor
1922	The Frozen North	Short film; also screenwriter
1922	The Electric House	Short film; also screenwriter
1922	Daydreams	Short film; also screenwriter and actor
1923	The Balloonatic	Short film; also screenwriter
1923	The Love Nest	Short film; also screenwriter
1923	Circus Days	
1923	Three Ages	Co-director (with Buster Keaton)
1923	The Meanest Man in the World	
1924	When a Man's a Man	
1924	Captain January	
1924	Little Robinson Crusoe	
1924	Along Came Ruth	
1925	The Rag Man	
1925	Old Clothes	
1926	Flirty Four-Flushers	
1927	Let It Rain	
1927	Soft Cushions	
1929	The Forward Pass	
1930	Leathernecking	
1930	Hook, Line and Sinker	
1931	Cracked Nuts	
1932	Million Dollar Legs	
1934	Peck's Bad Boy	
1934	The Dude Ranger	
1935	When a Man's a Man	
1935	It's a Great Life	
1937	Forty Naughty Girls	
1939	You Can't Cheat an Honest Man	
1940	My Little Chickadee	
1940	The Bank Dick	
1941	Never Give a Sucker an Even Break	
1942	What's Cookin'?	
1942	Give Out, Sisters	
1942	Behind the Eight Ball	
1943	Crazy House	
1944	Hat Check Honey	
1944	Ghost Catchers	
1945	Penthouse Rhythm	
1946	Bringing up Father	
1947	Jiggs and Maggie in Society	Also screenwriter
1947	Jiggs and Maggie in Court	Also screenwriter
1949	Jiggs and Maggie in Jackpot Jitters	Screenwriter only
1950	Jiggs and Maggie Out West	Co-director (with William Beaudine) and screenwriter

== Gallery ==
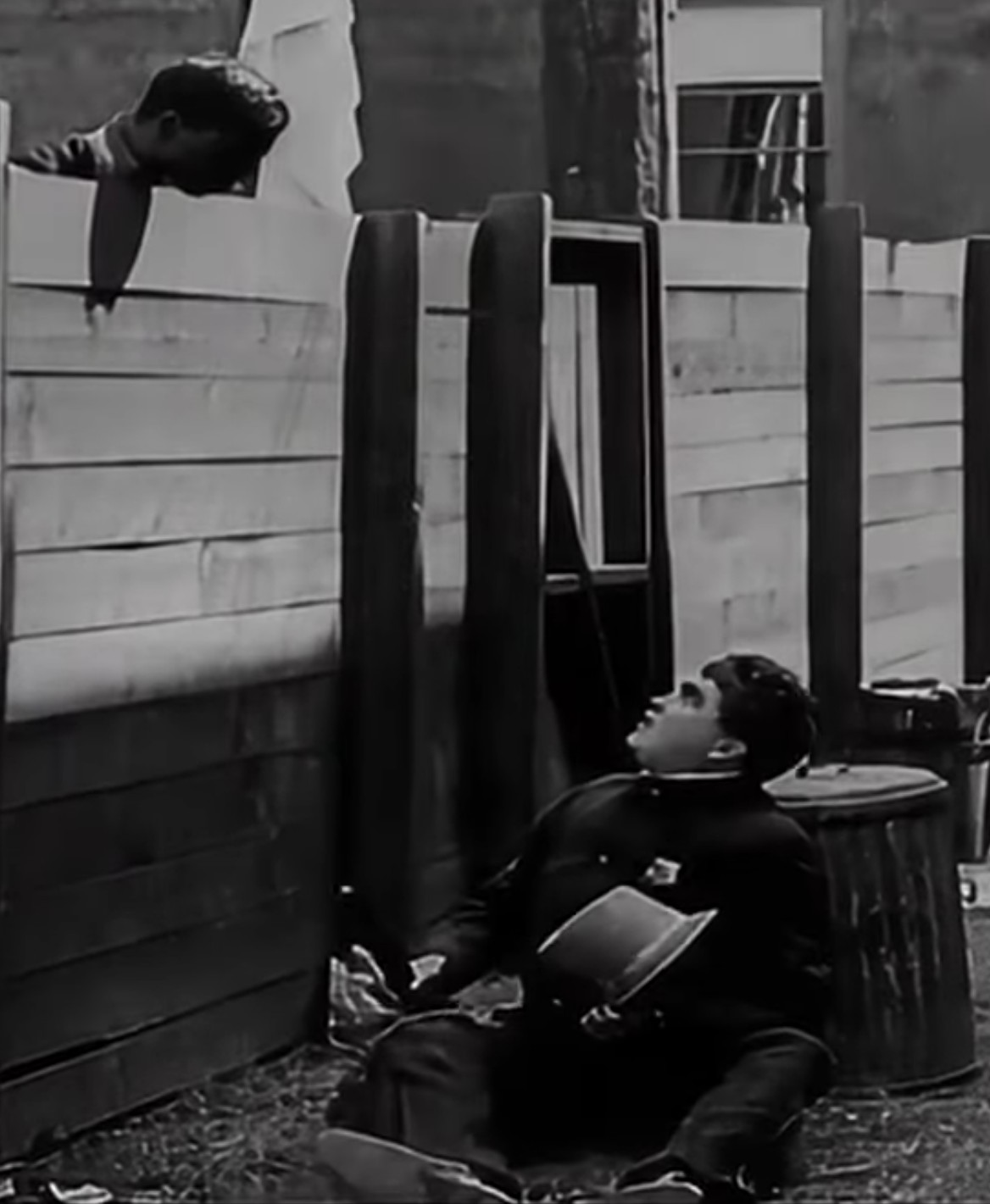
Edward Cline looking up at Buster Keaton in Neighbors (1920)

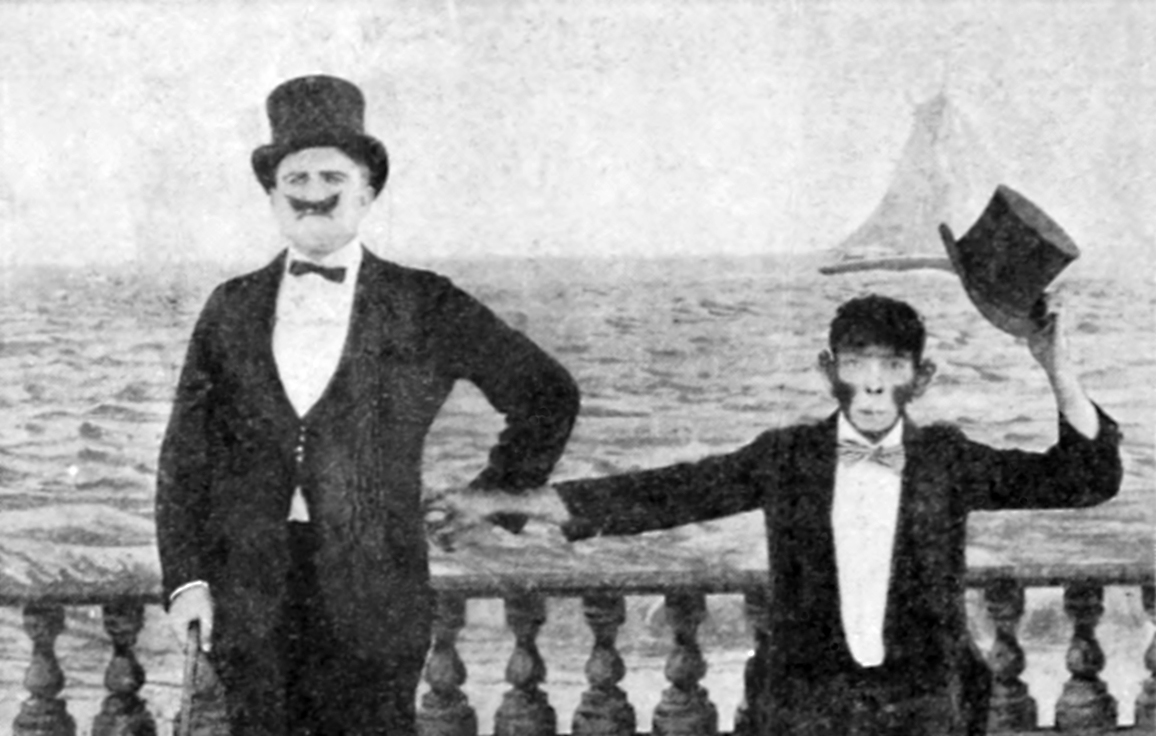
Cline and Keaton in The Playhouse (1921)

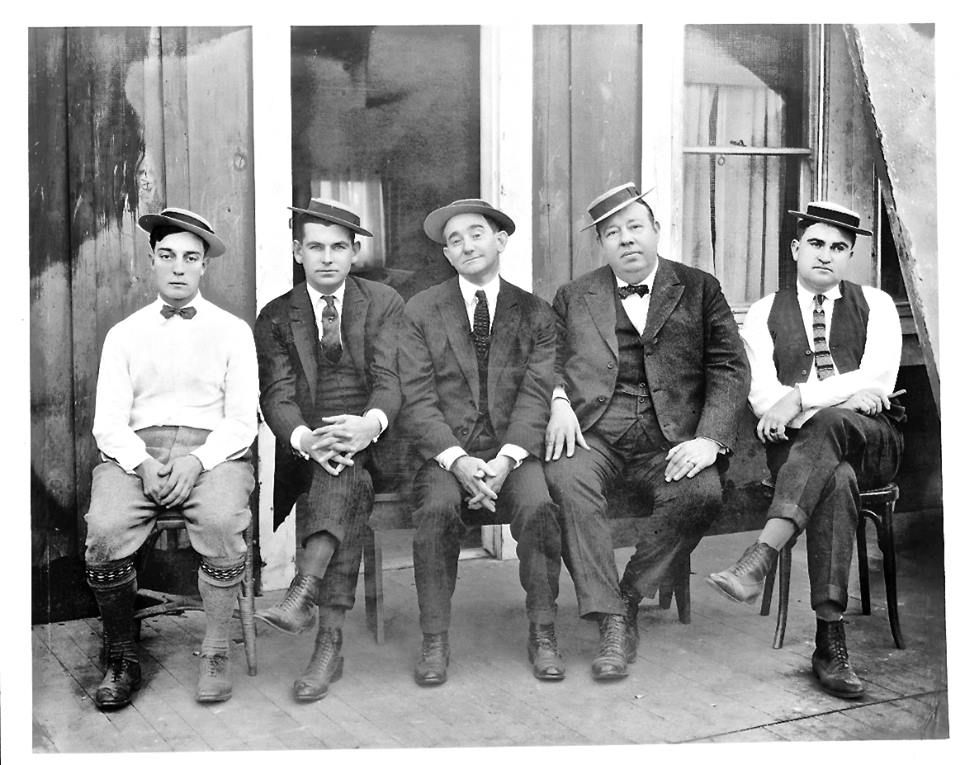
Keaton, Clyde A. Bruckman, Joseph A. Mitchell, Jean C. Havez, and Cline (1923)

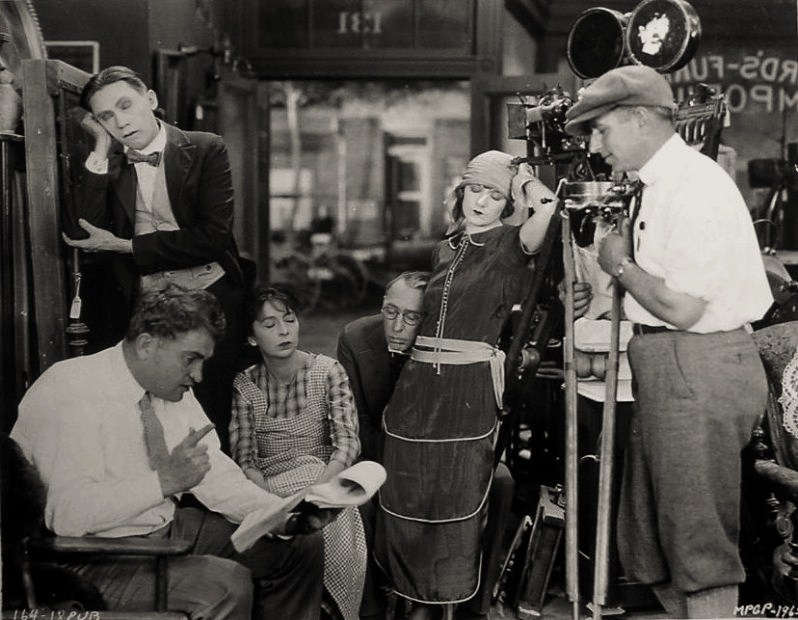
Cline with script, Victor Potel, Gale Henry, Tully Marshall, Viola Dana, and cinematographer John Arnold on the set of Along Came Ruth (1924)

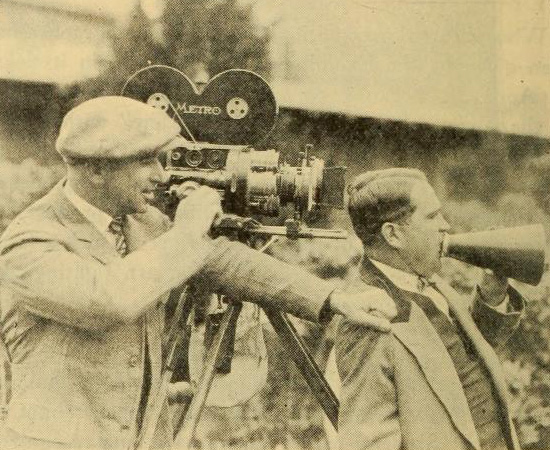
Cinematographer Arnold and director Cline on the set of Along Came Ruth (1924)

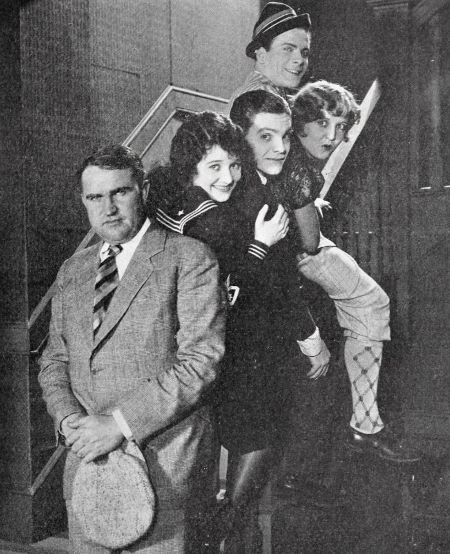
Cline, Alice Day, Eddie Quillan, Ruth Taylor, and Danny O'Shea: Puppy Lovetime (1926) publicity photo
