= The Paleface (1922 film) =

1922 film

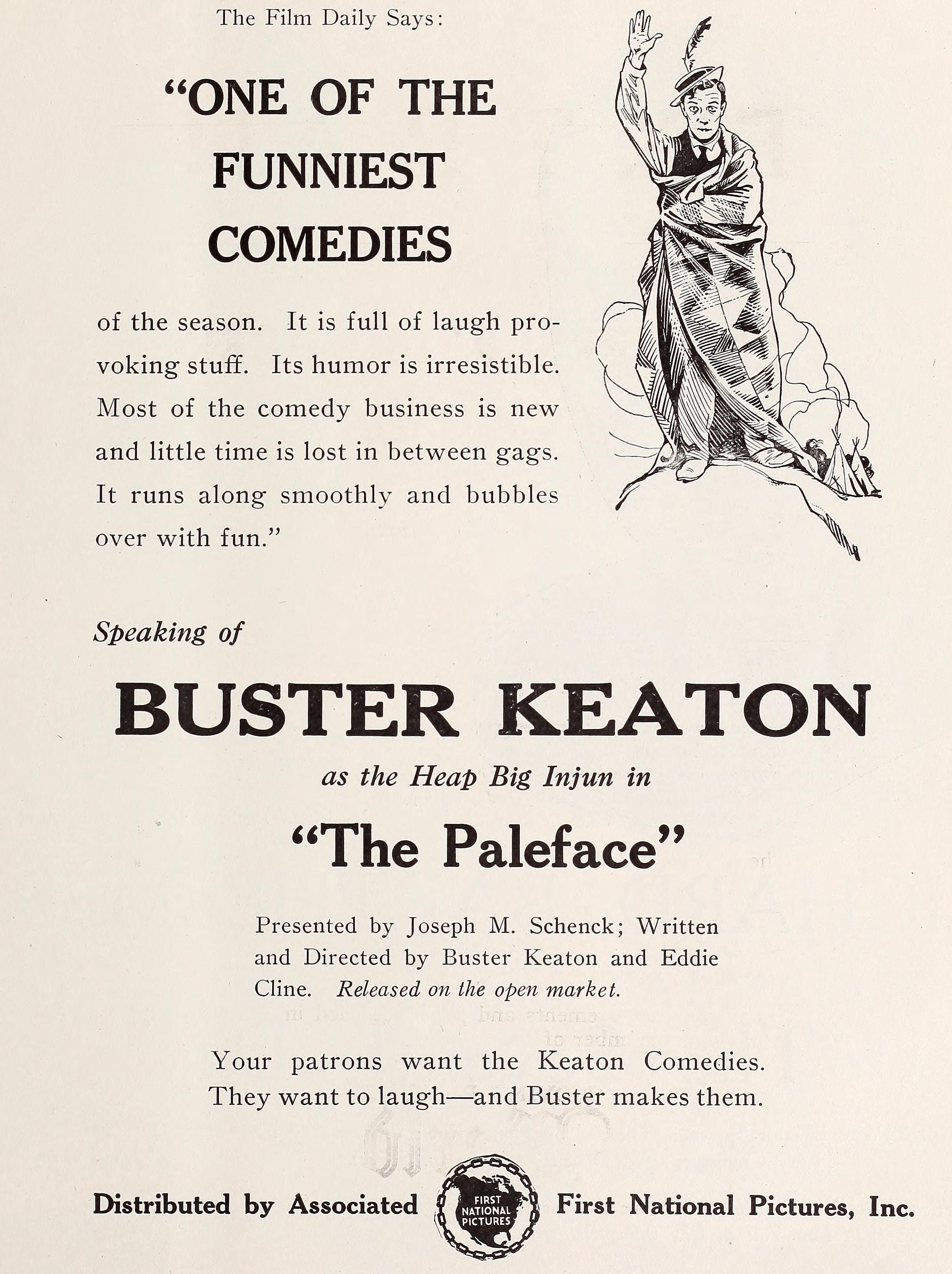
- Advertisement for the film in The Moving Picture World
- Directed by: Buster Keaton; Edward F. Cline
- Produced by: Joseph M. Schenck
- Starring: Buster Keaton
- Cinematography: Elgin Lessley
- Release date: January 15, 1922
- Running time: 20 minutes
- Country: United States
- Languages: Silent film (English intertitles)

The Paleface is a 1922 American silent comedy Western two-reeler film starring Buster Keaton.

== Plot ==
The short

Crooked "oil sharks" led by a man named Hunt have stolen an Indian tribe's lease to their land and given them 24 hours to vacate. Furious, the Indian chief orders that the first white man who enters their encampment be killed. A butterfly collector (Keaton) unwittingly wanders in while chasing a butterfly. They tie him to a stake and collect wood. When he frees himself, the Indian warriors give chase (at one point, a swastika is visible on a Native American blanket). During the pursuit, he finds some asbestos and fashions himself some fireproof underwear. As a result, when they catch him and try to burn him at the stake, he remains unharmed. Awed by this, the Indians adopt him and give him the title "Little Chief Paleface".

He subsequently leads the tribe in a confrontation with the crooks. When a brawl breaks out, the crooks' leader Hunt flees. The Indians give chase, with Little Chief Paleface bringing up the rear. Hunt captures the hero, forces him to switch clothes and gets away in disguise. After being nearly skewered by arrows from his own tribe, Little Chief Paleface finds the deed to the land in a pocket. As his reward, he chooses a pretty Indian maiden.

== Cast ==
- Buster Keaton as Little Chief Paleface
- Virginia Fox as Indian Maiden (uncredited)
- Joe Roberts as The Indian Chief (uncredited)

== See also ==
- List of American films of 1922
- Buster Keaton filmography
