= The Balloonatic =

1923 film

Balloonatic
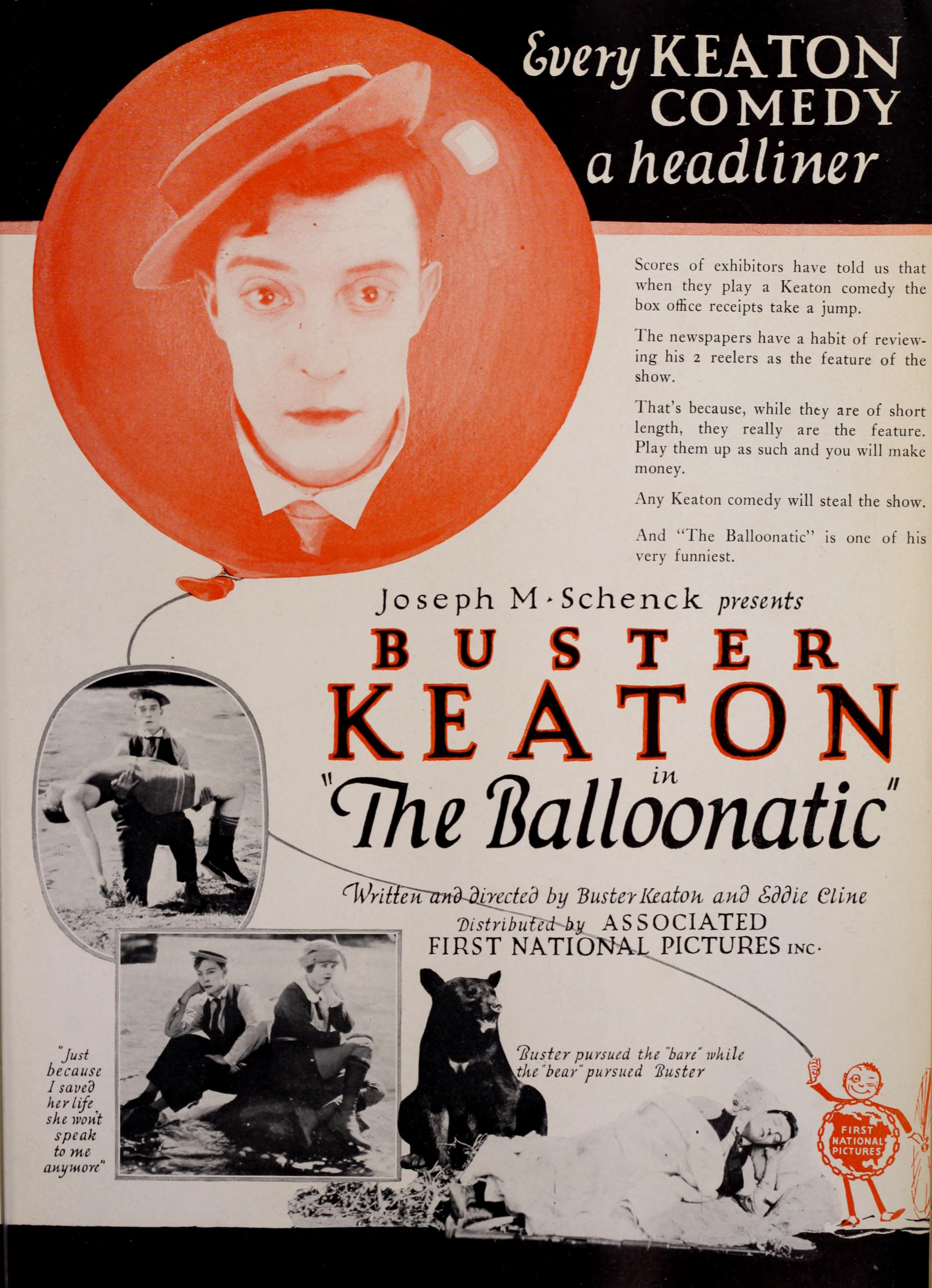
- Advertisement in Motion Picture News
- Directed by: Buster Keaton; Edward F. Cline
- Written by: Buster Keaton; Edward F. Cline
- Produced by: Joseph M. Schenck
- Starring: Buster Keaton
- Cinematography: Elgin Lessley
- Distributed by: First National Pictures
- Release date: January 22, 1923
- Running time: 22 minutes
- Country: United States
- Languages: Silent; English intertitles

Balloonatic is a 1923 American short comedy film co-directed by and starring Buster Keaton. It was one of Keaton's final short films.

== Plot ==
The Balloonatic (1923)

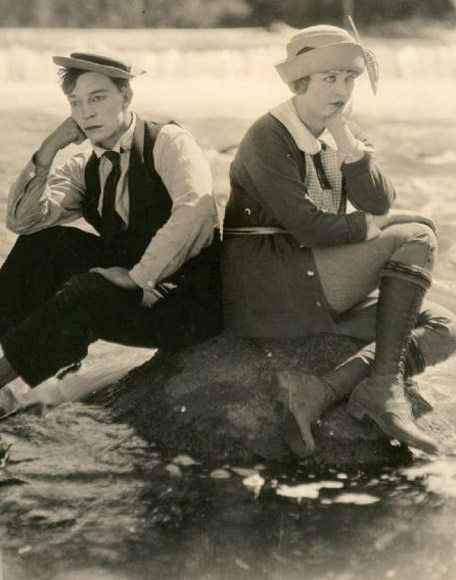
Buster Keaton and Phyllis Haver

A young man has a series of encounters in an amusement area, much like Coney Island, until happening upon a group of men preparing a gas balloon for launch. The young man assists the group by climbing atop the balloon to affix a pennant, when the balloon mistakenly takes flight with no one aboard but the young man. The young man finally downs the balloon in a wilderness area, where he encounters a young outdoorswoman and proceeds to have a series of misadventures.

== Cast ==
- Buster Keaton as The Young Man
- Phyllis Haver as The Young Woman
- Babe London as Fat Girl at The House of Trouble (uncredited)

== See also ==
- Buster Keaton filmography
