= The Electric House =

1922 film

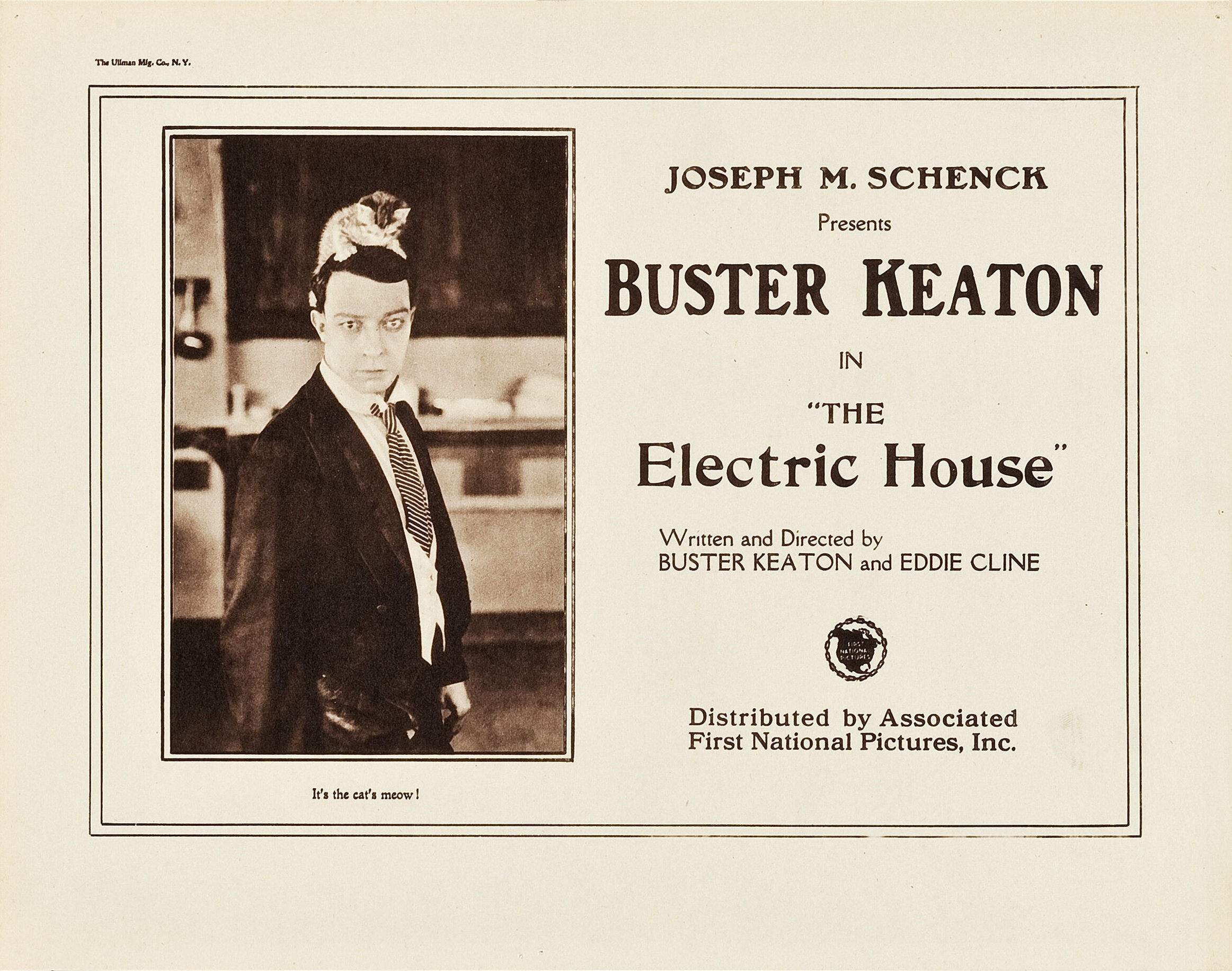
- Lobby card for The Electric House
- Directed by: Buster Keaton; Edward F. Cline
- Written by: Buster Keaton; Edward F. Cline
- Produced by: Joseph M. Schenck
- Starring: Buster Keaton
- Cinematography: Elgin Lessley
- Distributed by: First National Pictures
- Release date: October 16, 1922
- Running time: 22 minutes
- Country: United States
- Languages: Silent; English intertitles

The Electric House

The Electric House is a 1922 American short comedy film co-directed by and starring Buster Keaton.

== Plot ==
Three graduating students drop their degree certificates, but each picks up the wrong ones off the floor. Keaton plays a botany student who, accidentally, picked up an electrical engineering degree and is invited to wire a home using many gadgets. The man who actually was the electrical engineer graduate exacts revenge by rewiring those gadgets to cause mayhem.

== Cast ==
- Buster Keaton as himself
- Virginia Fox as Girl (uncredited)
- Joe Keaton as Extra (uncredited)
- Louise Keaton as Extra (uncredited)
- Myra Keaton as Extra (uncredited)
- Joe Roberts as Homeowner (uncredited)
- Steve Murphy as Real Electrical Engineer (uncredited)

== Production ==
During the original scheduled shooting of the film in 1920, Keaton suffered a broken ankle filming a sequence with the electric staircase. The project was shelved, and then re-done entirely. The known version today is actually the second version filmed; no copies of the original footage from 1920 are known to exist.

== See also ==
- Buster Keaton filmography
