= The Scribe =

The Scribe may refer to:

- The Scribe (film), a 1966 comedy film short
- The Scribe (UCCS), the official newspaper for the University of Colorado at Colorado Springs
- "The Scribe" (Ivor Gurney song), a classical song by Ivor Gurney
