= The Waiters' Ball =

1916 American silent short comedy film

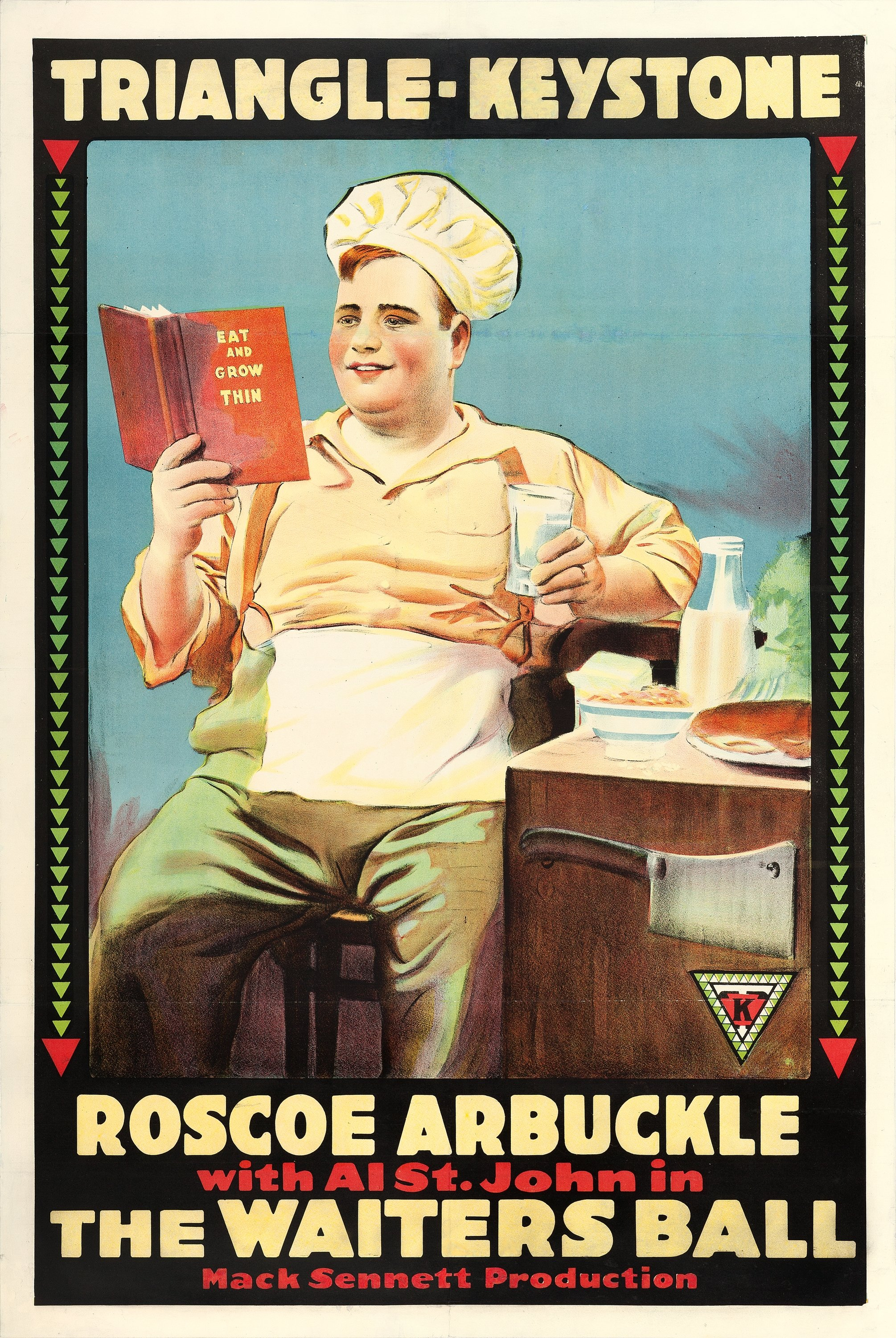
- Theatrical release poster
- Directed by: Fatty Arbuckle
- Produced by: Mack Sennett
- Starring: Fatty Arbuckle; Al St. John
- Cinematography: Elgin Lessley
- Production company: Keystone Film Company
- Distributed by: Triangle Films
- Release date: June 25, 1916
- Running time: 20 minutes
- Country: United States
- Language: Silent (English intertitles)

The Waiters' Ball is a 1916 American silent short comedy film directed by and starring Fatty Arbuckle. Arbuckle's nephew Al St. John has a memorable role as Roscoe's rival.

== Plot ==
A cook and a waiter at a restaurant are both attracted to the pretty cashier. She sees an ad for a waiters’ ball coming up that night. Attendees must wear evening clothes; the waiter is distressed because he doesn’t have any.

The waiter tries to sweep litter from the restaurant into the kitchen at the same time as the cook tries to sweep it out; they fight, hitting each other rhythmically with brooms. The waiter calls out customers’ orders to the kitchen using hash house lingo – e.g., two eggs on toast is “Adam and Eve on a raft.” Meanwhile, the cook prepares the orders with much juggling and many sight gags. For example, the cook gets a fish out of a cooler, but it’s still alive, and it leaps wildly; eventually, everyone in the restaurant becomes involved in subduing it.

The waiter sees the cook kiss the cashier, attacks him with a knife, and steals his dress suit. The cook therefore puts on the fat female dishwasher’s evening gown instead.

At the ball, the cook enjoys a dance while the waiter enjoys a beer. The cook then sees the waiter wearing his suit, chases him, and pulls the suit off him, leaving him in his striped underwear. The dishwasher similarly pulls her dress off the cook. The cook chases the waiter out to the street, where a police officer arrests them both and makes them don barrels.

== Cast ==
- Roscoe "Fatty" Arbuckle as The Cook
- Al St. John as The Waiter
- Corinne Parquet as The Cashier
- Joe Bordeaux as Her Brother
- Kate Price as The Dishwasher
- Alice Lake as A Fair Customer
- Jimmy Bryant as Restaurant customer
- George Marshall as Laundry Delivery Man

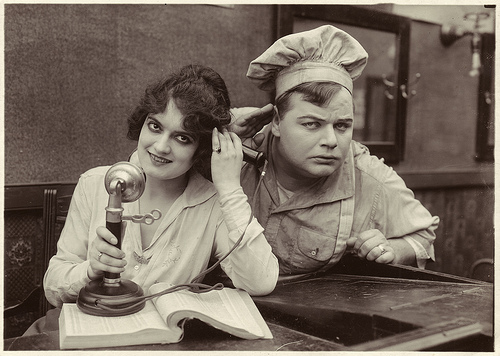
Film still with Corinne Parquet and Roscoe Arbuckle

== Influence ==
Arbuckle reused many elements of The Waiters' Ball in The Cook (1918), with Buster Keaton.

== Preservation ==
Two copies are held by George Eastman House, and the film was released along with 30 other Arbuckle films on DVD by Mackinac Media, now defunct.

== See also ==
- Fatty Arbuckle filmography
