= Our Hospitality =

1923 film by Buster Keaton and John G. Blystone

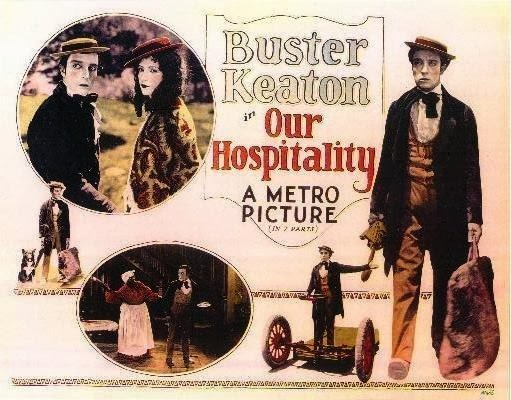
- Theatrical release poster
- Directed by: Buster Keaton; John G. Blystone
- Written by: Clyde Bruckman; Jean Havez; Joseph A. Mitchell
- Produced by: Joseph M. Schenck
- Starring: Buster Keaton; Joe Roberts; Natalie Talmadge
- Cinematography: Gordon Jennings; Elgin Lessley
- Production company: Joseph M. Schenck Productions
- Distributed by: Joseph M. Schenck Productions; Metro Pictures Corporation
- Release date: November 19, 1923 (United States)
- Running time: 75 minutes
- Country: United States
- Language: Silent (English intertitles)
- Box office: $537,844

Our Hospitality is a 1923 American silent period comedy film directed by Buster Keaton and John G. Blystone. Keaton stars as a young man who returns to his family home only to find himself embroiled in a generations-long family feud based on the real–life Hatfield–McCoy feud. Joe Roberts and Natalie Talmadge also feature.

Produced by Joseph M. Schenck and released by Metro Pictures in theaters on November 19, 1923, Our Hospitality has grossed over $500,000 at the box office. It was a groundbreaking work of comic cinema, as Keaton included "careful integration of gags into a dramatically coherent storyline," "meticulous attention to period detail" and beautiful cinematography and extensive location shooting"—a contrast to the era's other slapstick comedies. Turner Classic Movies describes Our Hospitality as a "silent film for which no apologies need be made to modern viewers."

== Plot ==
Our Hospitality

The Canfield and McKay families have been feuding for so long, no one remembers why the feud started in the first place. One stormy night in 1810, family patriarch John McKay and his rival James Canfield kill each other. After the tragic death of her husband, John's wife decides her son Willie will not suffer the same fate. She moves to New York to live with her sister, who after the mother's death raises him without telling him of the feud.

Twenty years later, Willie receives a letter informing him that his father's estate is now his. His aunt tells him of the feud, but he decides to return to his Southern birthplace anyway to claim his inheritance. On the train ride, he meets a girl, Virginia. They are shy to each other at first, but become acquainted during many train mishaps. At their destination, she is greeted by her father and two brothers; she, it turns out, is a Canfield. Willie innocently asks one of the brothers where the McKay estate is. The brother offers to show him the way, but stops at every shop in search of a pistol to shoot the unsuspecting Willie. By the time he obtains one, Willie has wandered off. Willie is very disappointed to discover the McKay "estate" is a rundown home, not the stately mansion he had imagined. Later, however, he encounters Virginia, who invites him to supper.

When he arrives, the brothers want to shoot him, but the father refuses to allow it while he is a guest in their mansion, referring to this as "our hospitality." When Willie overhears a conversation between the brothers, he finally realizes his grave predicament. A parson comes to supper as well, but as he prepares to leave, he finds it is furiously raining outside. The Canfield patriarch insists the parson stay the night, while McKay invites himself to do the same.

The next morning, McKay stays inside the house, while the Canfield men wait for his departure. McKay finally manages to leave by putting on a woman's dress as a chase ensues. Eventually, he starts down a steep cliff side, but is unable to find a way to the bottom. One Canfield lowers a rope (so he can get a better shot) to which Willie ties himself, but Canfield falls into the water far below, dragging Willie along. Finally, Willie manages to steal a train locomotive and tender, but the tender derails, dumping him into the river towards the rapids. Virginia spots him and goes after him in a rowboat, but falls into the water and is swept over the edge of the large waterfall. McKay swings trapeze-like on a rope, catching her hands in mid-fall and depositing her safely on a ledge.

When it grows dark, the Canfield men decide to continue their murderous search the next day. Returning home, they see Willie and Virginia embracing, Joseph Canfield furiously rushes into the room, gun in hand. He is brought up short by the parson, who asks him if he wishes to kiss the bride. Seeing a hanging "love thy neighbor" sampler, the father decides to bless the union and end the feud. The Canfields place their pistols on a table. Willie then divests himself of the many guns he took from their gun cabinet.

== Cast ==
- Buster Keaton as Willie McKay
- Buster Keaton Jr. as Baby Willie McKay
- Joe Roberts as Joseph Canfield
- Natalie Talmadge as Virginia Canfield, his daughter
- Ralph Bushman as Clayton Canfield, his son
- Craig Ward as Lee Canfield, his son
- Monte Collins as The Parson
- Joe Keaton as The Locomotive Engineer
- Jack Duffy as The Locomotive Leader
- Kitty Bradbury as Aunt Mary, William's aunt
- Edward Coxen as John McKay, William's father
- Jean Dumas as Mrs. McKay, William's mother
- Tom London as James Canfield, Joseph's brother
- Erwin Connelly as Quarreling Husband

== Production ==
Some exteriors were shot near Truckee, California at the Truckee River and along the Nevada County Narrow Gauge Railway between Grass Valley, California and Colfax, California. The famous waterfall rescue scene was shot on a special set at Keaton's Hollywood studio.

Although the original Hatfield–McCoy feud happened between 1878 and 1890, Keaton set his film in the 1830s. He had a passion for railroads and wanted the story to coincide with their invention. He had art director Fred Gabourie build fully functional replicas of trains with attention to every detail of their authenticity. However, Keaton chose not to use the early US DeWitt Clinton engine and instead had Gabourie build a replica of Stephenson's Rocket because he thought it looked funnier. He also employed a dandy horse which, by the 1830s, would have been out of fashion. The traveling shots of the locomotive are clear precursors to his later work in The General (1926).

Keaton cast his wife Natalie Talmadge in the lead role of Virginia, directing her to play her part as an old fashioned southern belle as well as an innocent schoolgirl. He also cast his father Joe Keaton as a grouchy train engineer and Joe Roberts as Virginia's father. The film was shot in Truckee, about 485 miles north of Los Angeles, and was decorated to recreate the Shenandoah Valley of the 1830s. The cast and 20-person crew arrived in Truckee in July 1923, along with the fully functional locomotive, three railroad passenger cars, 30 set pieces and enough building material for several miles of train track. As was normal for a Keaton production, the cast and crew often stopped shooting to play baseball or fish for Truckee salmon and trout when the opportunities arose. Despite what has sometimes been claimed, there is no evidence that any sequences were filmed in Oregon.

Roberts suffered a stroke on set during shooting. After a short hospital stay in Reno, he returned to finish his role but died of another stroke a few months later. Keaton, who never used a stunt double, nearly drowned in the Truckee River while filming one of his stunts: In a scene in river rapids, his restraining wire broke and he fell into the rocky river. It took ten minutes for the crew to find him face down and immobile on a riverbank. He recovered but he decided to shoot the rest of the river scene on a set in Los Angeles. He also shot a waterfall scene on a set using miniature scenery. However, he did perform the dangerous stunt where his character swings from a rope to the waterfall. He cast his fourteen-month-old son, Buster Keaton Jr., to play a baby version of himself in the film's prologue. The bright film lights irritated the infant's eyes and he had to be removed from the set.

Our Hospitality is the only film to feature three generations of the Keaton family: Buster, his father Joe, and his infant son. Keaton's wife Natalie was pregnant with their second child during filming, and late in the production she had to be filmed in ways that concealed her growing size.

== Music ==
In 2018, the Dallas Chamber Symphony commissioned composer Scott Glasgow to write a musical score for Our Hospitality, which premiered during a concert screening at Moody Performance Hall on October 13, 2018 with Richard McKay conducting.

== Reception ==
The film premiered on November 3, 1923, and was released on November 19, 1923. Keaton's previous film Three Ages was released while Our Hospitality was in post-production and was a big hit in both the US and Europe, breaking box office records in some cities. Originally titled Hospitality, the new film was another hit for Keaton, selling out many theaters and grossing $537,844, almost $100,000 more than Three Ages.

Critics at the time were generally positive. Variety wrote:

This is an unusual comedy picture, a novelty melange of dramatics, low comedy, laughs and thrills. Jean Havez has built up a comedy masterpiece about as serious a subject as a feud... The picture is splendidly cast, flawlessly directed and intelligently photographed. The usual low comedy and slapstick have been modified and woven into a consistent story that is as funny as it is entertaining.

Time magazine was also positive: "The Keatons, four of them, combine to make this picture highly hilarious." The San Francisco Call review called Keaton "a comedian, dramatic actor and acrobat par excellence," and Mordaunt Hall of The New York Times praised Talmadge's performance.

Our Hospitality has remained one of Keaton's acclaimed works, holding an average rating of 9.0 at Rotten Tomatoes with 96% positive reviews.Dave Kehr wrote: "With this work, Keaton began to display a dramatic sense to complement his comic sensibility—like The General, it is built with the integrity of a high-adventure story. Of course, Keaton still finds room for his inimitable sight gags and beloved gadgets, here including an early steam locomotive that pulls its carriage train up and down the hills of Pennsylvania with a lovely reptilian grace." Leonard Maltin called it a "sublime silent comedy, one of Buster's best, with a genuinely hair-raising finale." (four/four stars).

Jim Emerson wrote:

Our Hospitality is Keaton's first feature as auteur and his first masterpiece. It isn't his fastest, funniest or most dazzlingly inventive picture, but it is my sentimental favorite because of its serene, nostalgic beauty—a vision of a halcyon world (America, circa 1830) that was already, of course, charmingly old-fashioned by 1923 standards. "Our Hospitality" (co-directed by Keaton and Jack Blystone) displays some magnificent pictorial compositions, worthy of John Ford... What is first viewed through the frame is not always what it appears to be. But these aren't just tricks or sight gags (though they're often really funny), they are the very fabric of Keaton's constantly transforming cosmos. What a marvelous place it is.

Trains magazine rated Our Hospitality number 61 on its list of 100 Greatest Train Movies.

== Adaptations ==
Our Hospitality has been adapted into numerous Indian films, the first being the 2002 Kannada movie Balagalittu Olage Baa. A Telugu film adaptation, titled Maryada Ramanna, was released in 2010. The latter film was remade in Kannada as Maryade Ramanna (2011), in Bengali as Faande Poriya Boga Kaande Re (2011), in Hindi as Son of Sardaar (2012), in Tamil as Vallavanukku Pullum Aayudham (2014), and in Malayalam as Ivan Maryadaraman (2015).

== See also ==
- Buster Keaton filmography

== Bibliography ==
- Meade, Marion (1997). Buster Keaton: Cut to the Chase (1st ed.). New York: Da Capo Press. ISBN 0306808021.
