= Rafaela Ottiano =

Italian-American actress

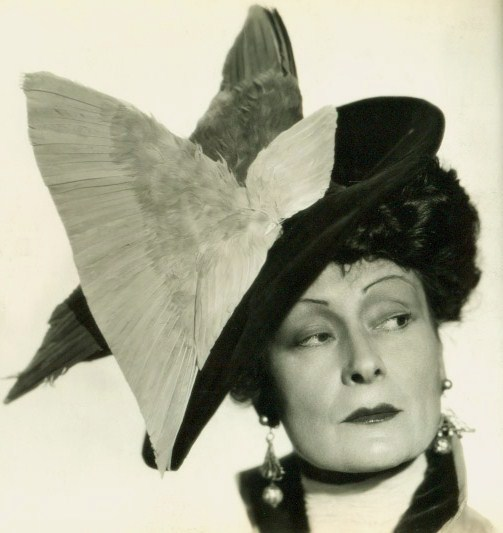
- Publicity still of Ottiano for She Done Him Wrong (1933)
- Born: March 4, 1888; Venice, Veneto, Kingdom of Italy
- Died: August 14, 1942 (aged 54); Boston, Massachusetts, U.S.
- Resting place: St. Michael's Cemetery, Boston
- Occupation: Actress
- Years active: 1906–1942

Rafaela Ottiano (March 4, 1888 – August 14, 1942) was an Italian-American actress. She was best known for her role as Suzette in Grand Hotel (1932) and as Russian Rita in She Done Him Wrong (1933).

== Early life ==
Ottiano was born on March 4, 1888, in Venice, Italy as the second child and daughter of the six children of Maddalena Polcari (1869–1914), a housewife, and Antonio Ottiano (1859–1915), a musician. Maddalena immigrated to United States in 1880, where she met Antonio who came four years after and married him in 1885. Ottiano was named after her paternal grandmother and older sister. Her sisters were Rafaela Bellizia Ottiano (born 1886), who died in infancy, and Maria Fransesca "Francis" De Stefano (born 1889), who moved with her to New York City on April 30, 1899. Her brothers were Pasquale "Patsies" (1892–1938) and James (1896–1971), both musicians, and Augustino Ottiano (1898–1987). In 1910, she immigrated to the United States with her parents and then was processed at Ellis Island, and resided in Boston with her family.

Ottiano worked as a saleslady in a department store before she began her acting career.

== Personal life ==
In 1913, Ottiano's youngest sister, Maria Fransesca, was married to Carmen De Stefano, a shoe cutter, and later had two children, Vincent and Madeline De Stefano. The marriage of Fransesca later made their family residence in Maverick St. had to be sold in between 1917 and 1920, where the couple took their part of the profits and later purchased a house at 382 Lovell St. in East Boston. The house was valued at USD 6000 in 1930, and the three unmarried Ottiano brothers; Patsies, James, Augustino, later moved with them as did their uncle and aunt, Nelson and Jennie Mottola.

Her mother, Maddalena, died at her residence in East Boston on October 15, 1914, from cerebral hemorrhage at the age of 45, and she was buried at St. Michael's Cemetery. Her father Antonio died a year later at Massachusetts General Hospital from a lung abscess at the age of 56, and he was interred with her mother.

Ottiano never married or had children; she died at her parents' residence in East Boston on August 14, 1942, at the age of 54.

== Career ==
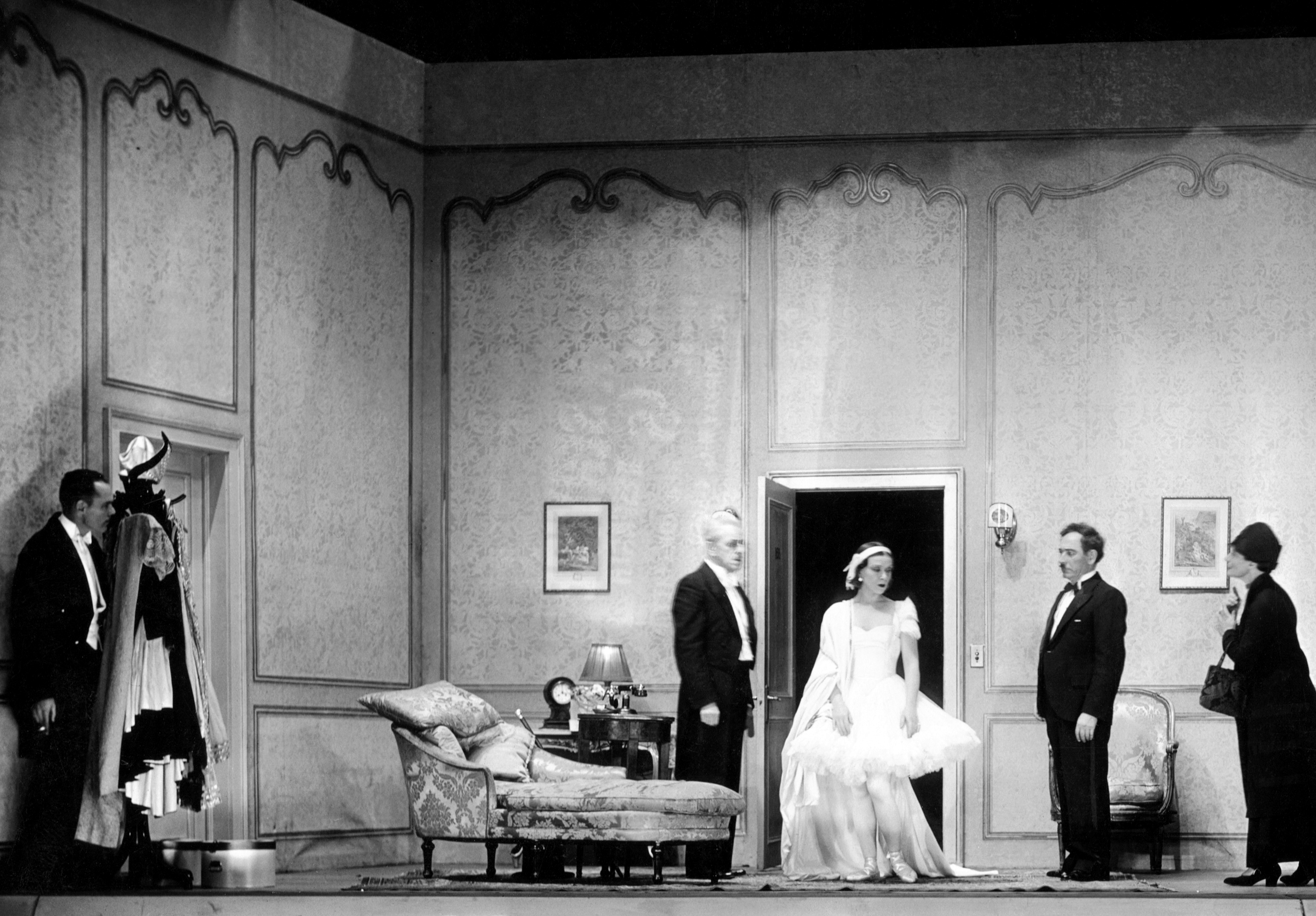
From the original Broadway production of Grand Hotel (l to r): Henry Hull, William Nunn, Eugenie Leontovich, Lester Alden, and Rafaela Ottiano (1930).

Ottiano began acting at age 18 and established herself as a stage actress in Europe before arriving in Hollywood in 1924 and appearing in American movies. She appeared on Broadway in Sweeney Todd (1924), the Mae West play Diamond Lil (1928), and the play version of Grand Hotel (1930). She made her film debut in the John L. McCutcheon-directed drama The Law and the Lady (1924) with Len Leo, Alice Lake, and Tyrone Power, Sr.

Ottiano was part of the original 1928 Broadway cast of the hit play Diamond Lil, written by and starring Mae West. She reprised her role as Rita when the play was adapted for the movie She Done Him Wrong (1933), directed by Lowell Sherman.

Throughout the 1930s, she often specialized in roles as sinister, malevolent, or spiteful women, such as her role in the Tod Browning-directed horror film The Devil-Doll (1936), with Lionel Barrymore and Maureen O'Sullivan.

Other notable film roles for Ottiano include Lena in As You Desire Me (1932) with Greta Garbo, Melvyn Douglas, Erich von Stroheim, Owen Moore, and Hedda Hopper, Mrs. Higgins in the Shirley Temple musical-comedy Curly Top (1935), as a matron in the crime-drama Riffraff (1936), starring Jean Harlow and Spencer Tracy, and as Suzette, Greta Garbo's devoted maid in the Edmund Goulding-directed drama Grand Hotel (1932).

In 1940, she starred in Victory, a melodramatic film which was adapted from novel by the same name by Joseph Conrad, and she was credited for her amusing incidental performance by The New York Times. Ottiano's last film was the musical comedy I Married an Angel (1942), starring Nelson Eddy and Jeanette MacDonald. During her film career, she appeared in approximately 45 motion pictures, with actors such as Barbara Stanwyck, Conrad Nagel, Peter Lorre, Zasu Pitts, and Katharine Hepburn.

When Grand Hotel was turned into a Broadway musical in 1989, her character was renamed Rafaela Ottiano in honor of the actress, who had appeared on Broadway in 1930 in the original play version of the Vicki Baum novel and in the subsequent movie adaptation.

== Partial filmography ==
- The Law and the Lady (1924) - Ma Sims
- Married ? (1926) - Maid
- Grand Hotel (1932) - Suzette
- Night Court (1932) - Evil Tongued Neighbor (uncredited)
- As You Desire Me (1932) - Lena
- The Washington Masquerade (1932) - Mona
- She Done Him Wrong (1933) - Russian Rita
- Bondage (1933) - Miss Trigge
- Ann Vickers (1933) - Mrs. Feldermans
- Female (1933) - Della - Alison's Maid (uncredited)
- Mandalay (1934) - Madame Lacalles
- All Men Are Enemies (1934) - Filomena
- The Last Gentleman (1934) - Retta Barr
- A Lost Lady (1934) - Rosa
- Great Expectations (1934) - Mrs. Joe
- Enchanted April (1935) - Francesca
- Lottery Lover (1935) - Gaby's Maid
- The Florentine Dagger (1935) - Lili Salvatore
- One Frightened Night (1935) - Elvira
- Curly Top (1935) - Mrs. Higgins
- Remember Last Night? (1935) - Mme. Bouclier
- Crime and Punishment (1935) - Landlady (uncredited)
- We're Only Human (1935) - Mrs. William Anderson (uncredited)
- Riffraff (1936) - Matron
- The Devil-Doll (1936) - Malita
- Anthony Adverse (1936) - Signora Buvino
- Mad Holiday (1936) - Ning
- That Girl from Paris (1936) - Nikki's Personal Maid (uncredited)
- Seventh Heaven (1937) - Madame Frisson
- Maytime (1937) - Ellen
- The League of Frightened Men (1937) - Dora Chapin
- The Toy Wife (1938) - Felicianne (uncredited)
- Marie Antoinette (1938) - Louise - Marie's Maid (uncredited)
- I'll Give a Million (1938) - Proprietress
- Suez (1938) - Maria De Teba
- Paris Honeymoon (1939) - Fluschotska
- Vigil in the Night (1940) - Mrs. Henrietta Sullivan (uncredited)
- The Long Voyage Home (1940) - Bella
- A Little Bit of Heaven (1940) - Mme. Lupinsky
- Victory (1940) - Madame Makanoff
- Topper Returns (1941) - Lillian - the Housekeeper
- The Adventures of Martin Eden (1942) - Marie Sylva
- I Married an Angel (1942) - Madelon (uncredited)
