= Love Nest on Wheels =

- Directed by: Buster Keaton; Charles Lamont
- Written by: Paul Gerard Smith (adaptation); William Hazlett Upson (story)
- Starring: Buster Keaton
- Cinematography: Dwight Warren
- Production company: Educational Pictures
- Distributed by: Twentieth Century-Fox Film Corporation
- Release date: March 26, 1937
- Running time: 20 minutes
- Country: United States
- Language: English

Love Nest on Wheels is a 1937 Educational Pictures short subject directed by Buster Keaton and Charles Lamont. The film borrows heavily from Keaton's 1918 film The Bell Boy and was a kind of "Hillbilly remake".

The film is notable because it is one of the rare times that Buster Keaton appeared onscreen with his family, with whom he had performed in vaudeville as the Three Keatons. The Keaton family also appeared together in the 1935 Educational short Palooka from Paducah.

== Plot ==
Elmer and his family run a small rural hotel, which is on the verge of closing unless they pay their $350 mortgage by the end of the day. A newly married couple arrives at the hotel, but husband and wife are disappointed by the dilapidated accommodations. Elmer convinces them to buy a trailer belonging to him, reasoning that they can spend their honeymoon traveling the country instead of staying at the hotel. The couple agrees to buy the trailer for $350, but Elmer discovers that his Uncle Jed has been using the trailer to house a cow, which is now too big to move out. Representatives from the bank arrive to shut down the hotel, but the cow suddenly escapes from the trailer. Elmer sells the trailer in time to pay off the mortgage.

== Cast ==
- Buster Keaton as Elmer
- Myra Keaton as Elmer's Ma
- Al St. John as Uncle Jed
- Lynton Brent as The Bridegroom
- Diana Lewis as The Bride
- Bud Jamison as The Mortgage Holder
- Louise Keaton as Elmer's Sis
- Harry Keaton as Elmer's Brother

Buster Keaton reunited with his family and with former screen colleague Al St. John for this short comedy. St. John's "Uncle Jed" characterization, with scruffy beard and old clothes, became the basis of his "Fuzzy Q. Jones" character in western features of the 1940s.

== Production ==
Love Nest on Wheels was the last of Buster Keaton's 16 two-reel comedies for Educational. The studio had been filming on both coasts, but by 1936 the company was forced to economize and confined most of its production to its New York facility. Keaton himself made three shorts in New York but returned to California, where studio president E. W. Hammons rented temporary studio space for him. Keaton was Educational's most expensive comedian ($5000 per film), and Hammons reluctantly released him. Hammons replaced Keaton with New York-based stage comedian Willie Howard.

== Copyright Status ==
The film's copyright was renewed in 1964, and the work will enter the US public domain in 2033.
