= A Country Hero =

1917 film

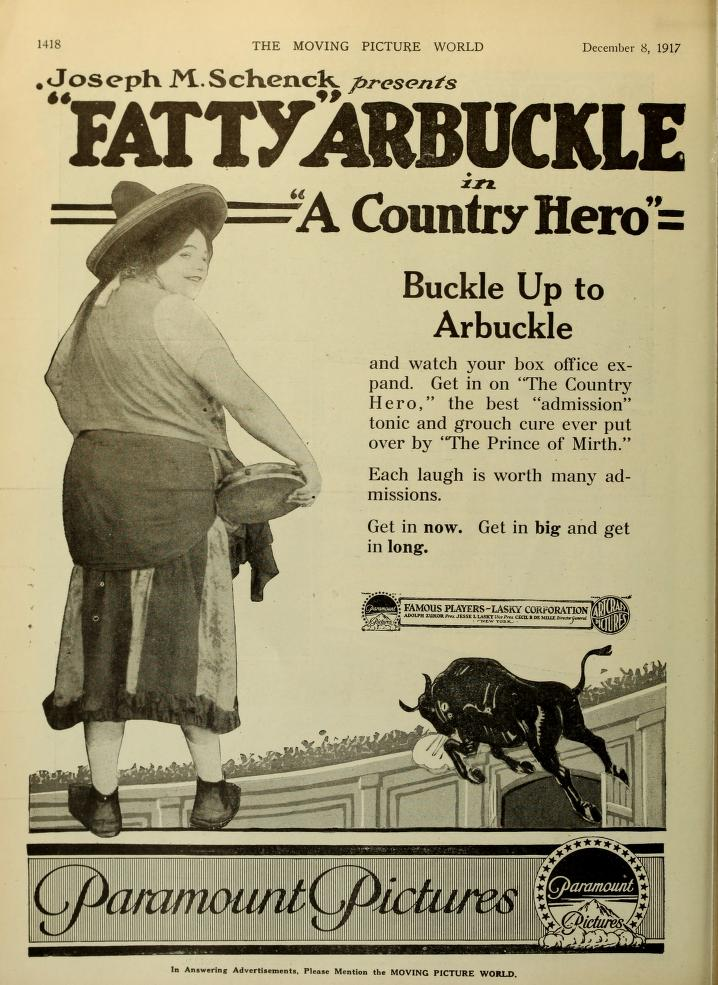
- The Moving Picture World August 12, 1917
- Directed by: Roscoe Arbuckle
- Written by: Roscoe Arbuckle
- Starring: Roscoe Arbuckle; Buster Keaton
- Cinematography: George Peters
- Edited by: Herbert Warren
- Production company: Comique Film Company
- Distributed by: Paramount Pictures
- Release date: December 10, 1917
- Running time: 2 reels
- Country: United States
- Languages: Silent; English intertitles

A Country Hero is a 1917 American two-reel silent comedy film directed by and starring Roscoe "Fatty" Arbuckle and featuring Buster Keaton. The film is considered to be lost.

== Cast ==
- Roscoe "Fatty" Arbuckle as Village Blacksmith
- Buster Keaton as Vaudeville Artist
- Al St. John as City Gent
- Alice Lake as Schoolteacher
- Joe Keaton as Cy Klone, Garage Owner
- Scott Pembroke (as Stanley Pembroke)
- Natalie Talmadge in a bit part (uncredited)

== See also ==
- Fatty Arbuckle filmography
- Buster Keaton filmography
- List of lost films
