= As You Desire Me (film) =

1932 film

- Original film poster
- Directed by: George Fitzmaurice
- Written by: Gene Markey; Luigi Pirandello (play)
- Produced by: George Fitzmaurice; Irving Thalberg
- Starring: Greta Garbo; Melvyn Douglas; Erich von Stroheim; Owen Moore; Hedda Hopper
- Cinematography: William H. Daniels
- Edited by: George Hively
- Distributed by: Metro-Goldwyn-Mayer
- Release date: May 28, 1932
- Running time: 70 minutes
- Country: United States
- Language: English
- Budget: $469,000
- Box office: $1,363,000 (rentals)

As You Desire Me is a 1932 American pre-Code film adaptation of the 1929 play by Luigi Pirandello released by Metro-Goldwyn-Mayer. It was produced and directed by George Fitzmaurice with Irving Thalberg as co-producer. The adaptation was by Gene Markey, the cinematography by William H. Daniels, the art direction by Cedric Gibbons and the costume design by Adrian.

The film stars Greta Garbo and Melvyn Douglas, with Erich von Stroheim, Owen Moore and Hedda Hopper. The film's running time is about 70 minutes, making it the shortest of all Garbo's Hollywood films.

== Plot ==
Budapest bar entertainer Zara is a discontented alcoholic who is pursued by many men but lives with novelist Carl Salter. A strange man, Tony Boffie, shows up on Salter's estate claiming that Zara is actually Maria, the wife of his close friend Bruno. Maria, Tony claims, had her memory destroyed during a World War I invasion ten years ago. Zara doesn't remember but leaves with Tony to Salter's dismay. Bruno, now an officer in the Italian army, tries to coax Maria's memory back on his large estate. No one is really sure if Zara is Maria, and when Salter shows up with a woman who is a mental case that he claims is the real Maria, everyone on Bruno's estate is desperately searching for the truth.

== Cast ==
- Greta Garbo as Zara / Maria
- Melvyn Douglas as Count Bruno Varelli
- Erich von Stroheim as Carl Salter
- Owen Moore as Tony Boffie
- Hedda Hopper as Ines Montari
- Rafaela Ottiano as Lena
- Warburton Gamble as Baron
- Albert Conti as Captain
- Roland Varno as Albert

== Production ==
As You Desire Me is the first of three films teaming Garbo with actor Melvyn Douglas. It is also the only film in which Garbo appears as a blonde. The film is based on the three-act drama by Luigi Pirandello Come tu mi vuoi, which is inspired by the Bruneri-Canella case.

== Reception ==
The film earned $705,000 in theatrical rentals in the United States and Canada and $658,000 elsewhere, for a total of $1,363,000, generating a profit of $449,000.
