= The Play House =

1921 film

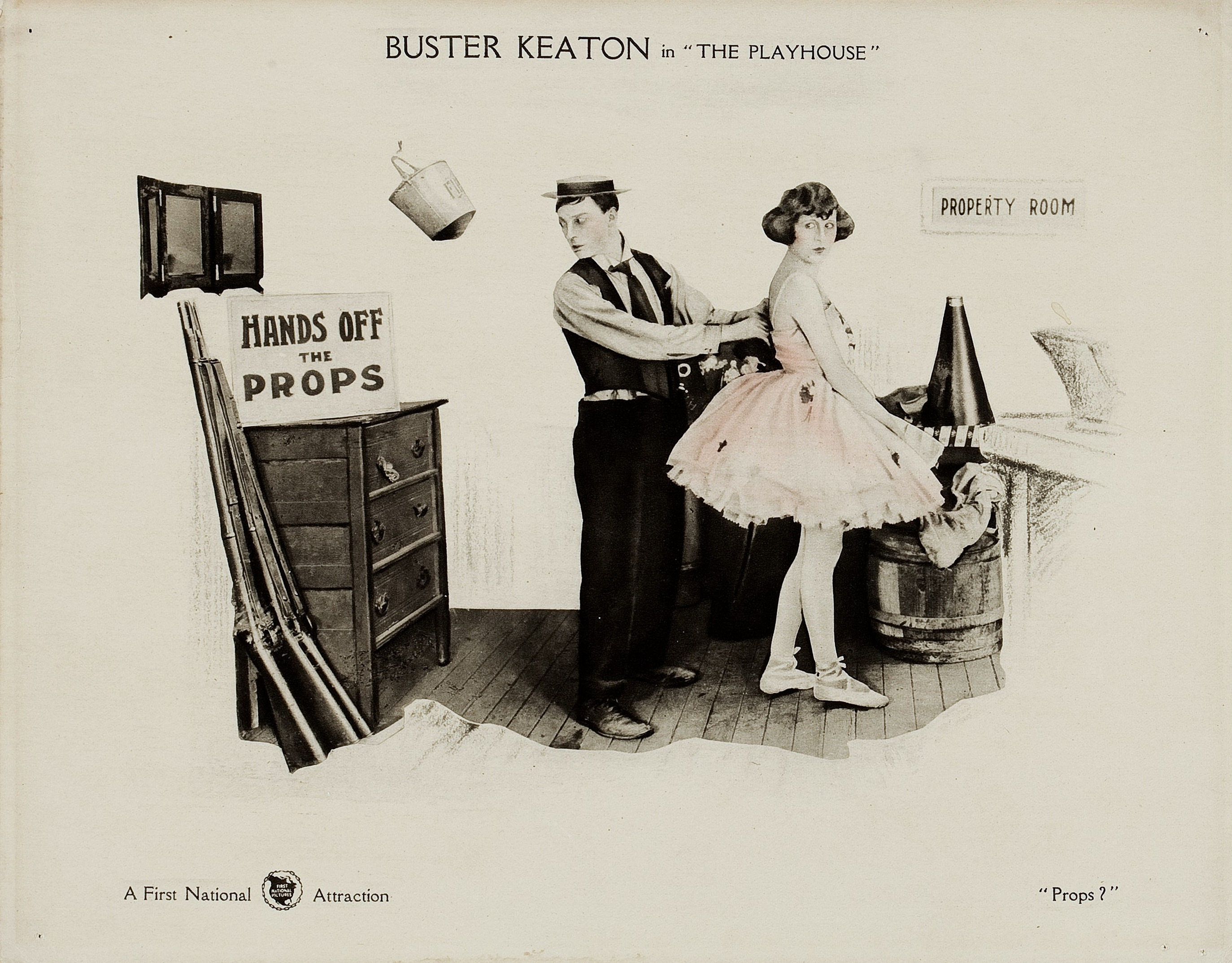
- Lobby card for the film
- Directed by: Buster Keaton; Eddie Cline
- Written by: Buster Keaton; Eddie Cline
- Produced by: Joseph M. Schenck
- Starring: Buster Keaton
- Cinematography: Elgin Lessley (uncredited)
- Distributed by: A First National Attraction
- Release date: October 6, 1921
- Running time: 22 minutes
- Country: United States
- Language: Silent (English intertitles)

The Playhouse

The Play House is a 1921 American two-reel silent comic trick film written by, directed by, and starring Buster Keaton. It runs for 22 minutes, and is most famous for an opening sequence in which Keaton plays every role.

== Plot ==
The film is set up as a series of humorous tricks on the audience, with constant doubling, and in which things are rarely what they at first seem to be. It opens with Keaton attending a variety show. Keaton plays the conductor and every member of the orchestra, the actors, dancers, stagehands, minstrels and every member of the audience, male and female. As an audience member, Keaton turns to the "woman" sitting beside him and remarks: "This fellow Keaton seems to be the whole show". This was a jibe at one of Keaton's contemporaries, Thomas Ince, who credited himself generously in his film productions. In interviews with Kevin Brownlow, Keaton claims he gave the director's credit to Cline mainly because he did not want to appear too Ince-like himself: "Having kidded things like that, I hesitated to put my own name on as a director and writer".

This elaborate trick-photography sequence turns out to be only a dream when Joe Roberts rouses Keaton from bed. The bedroom then turns out to be not a bedroom, but a set on a stage.

The second half of the film finds Keaton's character falling for a girl who happens to be a twin. He has difficulty telling the twin who likes him from the one who does not. An uncredited Virginia Fox plays one of the twins. Eddie Cline co-wrote the production and appears, uncredited, as a monkey trainer, whose monkey Keaton impersonates onstage after accidentally letting the animal escape.

== Cast ==
- 'Buster' Keaton as Audience / Orchestra / Mr. Brown - First Minstrel / Second Minstrel / Interlocutors / Stagehand
- Eddie Cline as Orangutan trainer (uncredited)
- Virginia Fox as Twin (uncredited)
- Joe Roberts as Actor-Stage Manager (uncredited)
- Monte Collins as Civil War Veteran (uncredited)
- Joe Murphy as One of the Zouaves (uncredited)
- Jess Weldon as One of the Zouaves (uncredited)
- Ford West as Stage Hand (uncredited)

== Production ==
=== Development ===
Keaton had fractured his ankle in the film he worked on before this one, so The Play House relied more on cinematic techniques and sight gags than stunt work. It references gags from Keaton's vaudeville career with The Three Keatons, and also draws themes from the performances of Annette Kellerman, who employed 100 mirrors to create the illusion that there was more than one of her. While Keaton played all the parts in the first scene of the play, he had considered playing all the parts in the entire film. But he refrained from doing so out of the concern that "audiences might tire of the joke or think he made it as a demonstration of his acting virtuosity." He later regretted not having acted all the parts throughout.

=== Filming ===
Keaton's portrayal of nine members of a minstrel show required the use of a special matte box in front of the camera lens. It had nine exactingly-machined strips of metal which could be moved up and down independently of each other. Elgin Lessley, Keaton's cameraman, shot the far-left Keaton with the first shutter up, and the others down. He then rewound the film, opened the second segment, and re-filmed the next Keaton in sequence. This procedure was repeated seven more times. The camera was hand-wound, so Lessley's hand had to be absolutely steady during filming to avoid any variation in speed. Keaton synchronized his movements for each character's dance to the music of a banjo player who was playing along with a metronome – not a problem in a silent film. It was decades before Keaton, who masterminded this, revealed his technique to other filmmakers.

== Release ==
The Play House was released on October 6, 1921, and distributed by First National Attraction.

== Legacy ==
According to Wild Man from Borneo: A Cultural History of the Orangutan (2014): "The comedy turns on Keaton's extraordinary ability to imitate an ape imitating a man as he dines at a table, smokes a cigar, and then jumps, unscripted, into the auditorium, making a woman faint."

== See also ==
- List of American films of 1921
- Buster Keaton filmography
- The Oxford Playhouse (theater)
- Joe Martin (orangutan)
