= The Hurricane (1926 film) =

1926 silent film

- Directed by: John Frederick Caldwell
- Written by: John Frederick Caldwell
- Starring: Alice Lake; Stuart Holmes; Jack Richardson
- Production company: Truart Film Corporation
- Distributed by: Truart Film Corporation
- Release date: February 26, 1926
- Running time: 50 minutes
- Country: United States
- Languages: Silent; English intertitles

The Hurricane is a 1926 American silent drama film directed by John Frederick Caldwell and starring Alice Lake, Stuart Holmes and Jack Richardson.

== Cast ==
- Alice Lake as The Wife
- Stuart Holmes as The Smuggler
- Jack Richardson as The Husband
- Muriel Reynolds
- George Foster
- John Frederick Caldwell
- Donald Edwards

== Bibliography ==
- Munden, Kenneth White. The American Film Institute Catalog of Motion Pictures Produced in the United States, Part 1. University of California Press, 1997.
