= Raymond L. Schrock =

American screenwriter

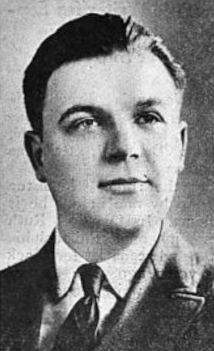
- Born: February 2, 1892; Goshen, Indiana, US
- Died: December 12, 1950 (aged 58); Hollywood, California, US
- Occupation: Screenwriter
- Years active: 1915–1950

Raymond L. Schrock (February 2, 1892 – December 12, 1950) was an American screenwriter. He worked on more than 150 films between 1915 and 1950. He was born in Goshen, Indiana, and died in Hollywood, California, from a heart attack.

== Partial filmography ==
- Judy Forgot (1915)
- The Gentle Art of Burglary (1916)
- The Man Inside (1916)
- The Sphinx (1916)
- Never Say Quit (1919)
- Help! Help! Police! (1919)
- Luck and Pluck (1919)
- The Winning Stroke (1919)
- Burn 'Em Up Barnes (1921)
- The Long Chance (1922)
- I Am the Law (1922)
- A Woman's Woman (1922)
- Confidence (1922)
- Bavu (1923)
- The Clean Up (1923)
- Kindled Courage (1923)
- Little Johnny Jones (1923)
- The Gentleman from America (1923)
- Shootin' for Love (1923)
- McGuire of the Mounted (1923)
- Out of Luck (1923)
- The Acquittal (1923)
- The Thrill Chaser (1923)
- The Darling of New York (1923)
- Hook and Ladder (1924)
- Ride for Your Life (1924)
- Ridgeway of Montana (1924)
- K – The Unknown (1924)
- The Dancing Cheat (1924)
- Jack O'Clubs (1924)
- Wine (1924)
- The Hurricane Kid (1925)
- The Taming of the West (1925)
- The Saddle Hawk (1925)
- The Calgary Stampede (1925)
- The Phantom of the Opera (1925)
- Private Izzy Murphy (1926)
- Burning the Wind (1928)
- The Duke Steps Out (1929)
- Shipmates (1931)
- Hell Below (1933)
- Sitting on the Moon (1936)
- Devil's Island (1939)
- Secret Service of the Air (1939)
- Kid Nightingale (1939)
- The Hidden Hand (1942)
- Wild Bill Hickok Rides (1942)
- Escape from Crime (1942)
- The Last Ride (1944)
- Gas House Kids (1946)
- I Ring Doorbells (1946)
- Daughter of the West (1949)
- Prisoners in Petticoats (1950)
