= The Bell Boy =

1918 film by Roscoe Arbuckle

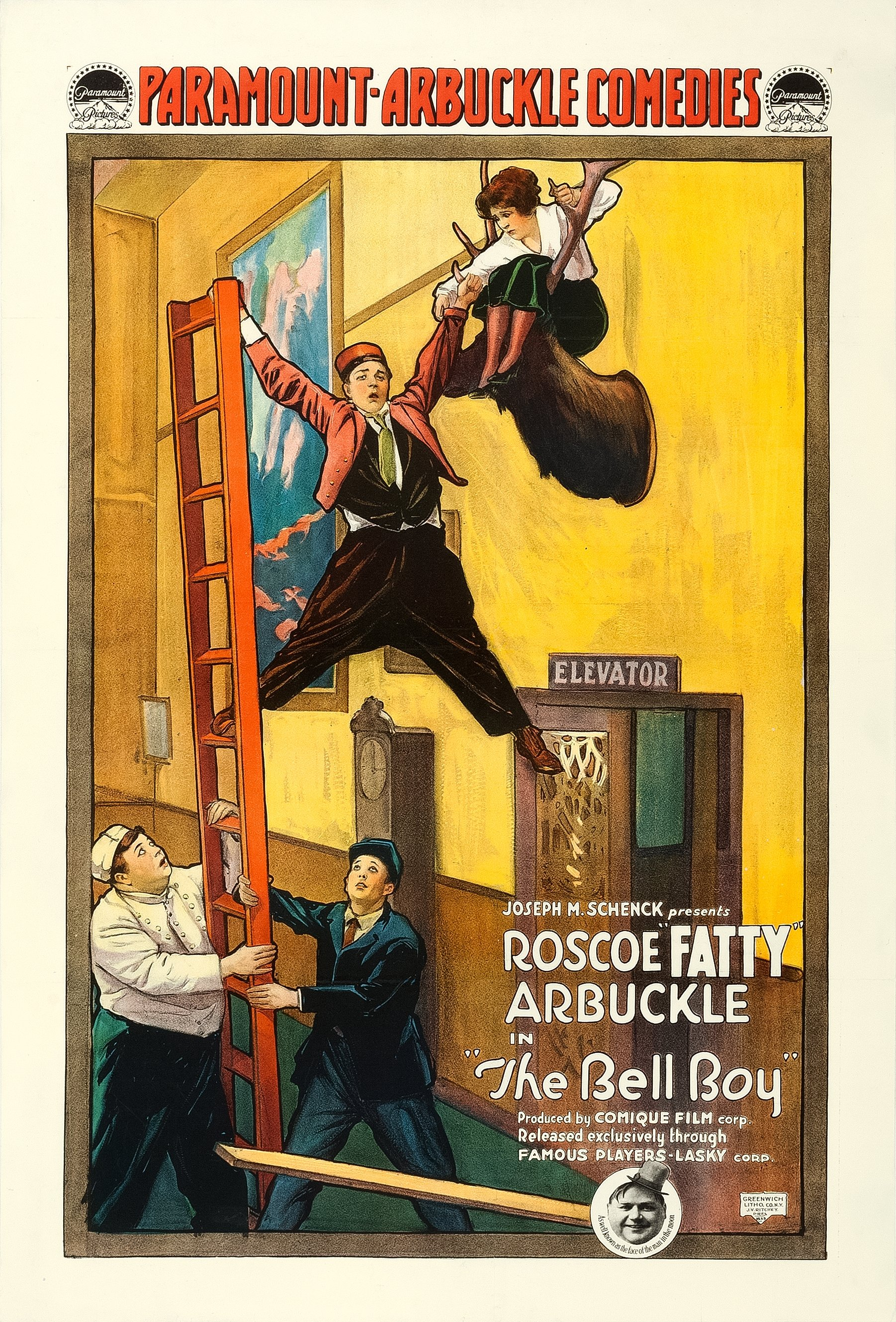
- Directed by: Roscoe Arbuckle
- Written by: Roscoe Arbuckle
- Starring: Roscoe Arbuckle; Buster Keaton
- Cinematography: Elgin Lessley; George Peters
- Edited by: Herbert Warren
- Production company: Comique Film Company
- Distributed by: Paramount Pictures
- Release date: March 18, 1918
- Running time: 33 minutes
- Country: United States
- Language: Silent (English intertitles)

The Bell Boy (1918) by Roscoe Arbuckle

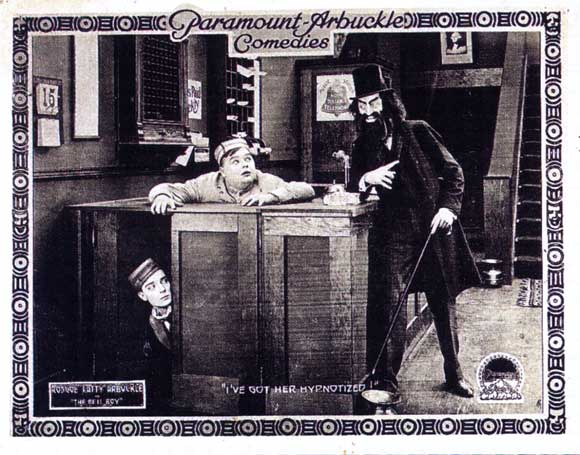
Lobby card

The Bell Boy is a 1918 American two-reel silent comedy film directed by Roscoe "Fatty" Arbuckle for the Comique film company.

The film stars Arbuckle and Buster Keaton as bellboys in the Elk's Head Hotel. Much of the material in the film was later re-used by Keaton in his 1937 film Love Nest on Wheels. One sequence involving a mop was reused by Keaton in one of his last film appearances in The Scribe.

== Plot ==
Arbuckle and Keaton play a pair of incompetent bellhops who are constantly careless with guest's luggage and slack on the job. One morning a new customer, who resembles Rasputin the Mystic, arrives at the hotel asking for a shave and Arbuckle, being a skilled barber, is happy to oblige. He cuts his hair and facial hair in a way which first makes him resemble Ulysses S. Grant, Abraham Lincoln and finally Kaiser Wilhelm (America had entered World War I only months earlier). His attention is soon turned, as is Keaton's, to an attractive new hotel manicurist, Cutie Cuticle, and they begin to bicker and fight over her. While Arbuckle finishes dealing with Rasputin, Keaton gets stuck in the hotel elevator, and while attempting to free him, Arbuckle accidentally propels Cutie into the air and onto a moose head mounted on the wall. The bellboys both rescue her, but Fatty takes all the credit and scores himself a date with Cutie.

In order to make himself look even more heroic, Arbuckle arranges for Keaton and the hotel clerk to pretend to rob the town bank so that Arbuckle can show up on the scene and apprehend them in front of Cutie. However, when Keaton and the clerk arrive at the bank they discover that it is already being robbed. The robbers brawl with the bellboys and the clerk, and in the ensuing chaos the thieves get away, hijacking a horse and trolley and riding out of town. The bellboys and the clerk chase the trolley on foot; the local livery stable proprietor (who is also the town constable) gives chase on a motorcycle. The trolley becomes unhooked from the horse while in the middle of an uphill climb and comes speeding back down, crashing into the hotel lobby. The thieves are arrested; Arbuckle is given a reward for apprehending them, and receives a kiss from Cutie.

== Cast ==
- Roscoe "Fatty" Arbuckle as Bellboy, barber
- Buster Keaton as Bellboy
- Al St. John as Desk Clerk
- Alice Lake as Cutie Cuticle, manicurist
- Joe Keaton as Guest
- Charles Dudley as Guest

== Critical reception ==
Variety gave an unqualified positive review of the film: "Roscoe 'Fatty' Arbuckle's latest screen comedy, released this week, 'The Bell Boy,' is excruciatingly funny... The rapid, acrobatic comedy of these three slapstick comedians had the audience in hysterics at the Rialto Sunday afternoon." The reviewer also mentioned the "long-haired, bewhiskered individual", stating that the character was dubbed "Jassrutin the Mad Monkey", a likely reference to Rasputin.

The Moving Picture World espoused a similar view of the picture, adding that: "Fatty Arbuckle is a living example of how to be nimble though fat, and his fertility of invention supplies him with the right piece of business for every situation. Al St. John as the hotel clerk, Buster Keaton as the assistant bell boy and Alice Lake as the manicurist are a trio whose acting ability is equaled only by their disregard of life and limb."

== See also ==
- List of American films of 1918
- Roscoe Arbuckle filmography
- Buster Keaton filmography
