= I Am the Law (1922 film) =

1922 film

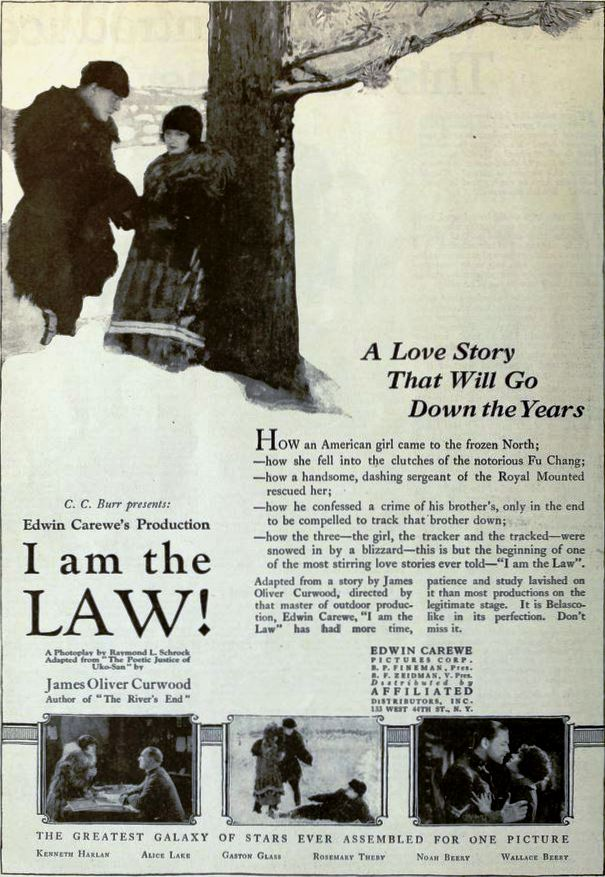
- Magazine advertisement
- Directed by: Edwin Carewe
- Written by: Raymond L. Schrock
- Based on: "The Poetic Justice of Uko San" by James Oliver Curwood
- Produced by: Edwin Carewe; C.C. Burr
- Starring: Alice Lake; Kenneth Harlan; Rosemary Theby; Gaston Glass; Noah Beery; Wallace Beery
- Cinematography: Robert Kurrle
- Production company: Edwin Carewe Picture Corp.
- Distributed by: Affiliated Distributors
- Release date: June 1, 1922
- Country: United States
- Language: Silent (English intertitles)

I Am the Law is a 1922 American drama film starring Alice Lake and Kenneth Harlan, and featuring Noah Beery, Sr. and Wallace Beery. The movie was written by Raymond L. Schrock based upon a 1910 story by James Oliver Curwood, and directed by Edwin Carewe. Curwood successfully sued Affiliated Distributors to have his name taken off of the film as he felt it did not resemble his short story, a result next achieved 70 years later when Stephen King successfully sued to have his name taken off of The Lawnmower Man.

== Plot ==
The plot, as described by the defendants in the 1922 court case regarding the attribution of the Curwood story:

Two brothers were members of the Royal Northwest Mounted Police at the little settlement of Paradise. One, Corporal Fitzgerald, was counted the best man tracker in the north and a credit to the Mounted; his younger and weak brother, Tom, private, had often been reprimanded for misconduct (by the commandant), and at the time the story opens he was carrying on a secret affair with the wife of the commanding officer at the post. The corporal had learned of it, and reproved his brother, but Tom defied him. A school-teacher, Joan Cameron, in traveling through the forest, had been caught in a storm, and had taken refuge at the notorious dance hall conducted by a half-breed Chinaman, who was pressing his advances upon her when the corporal arrived and killed him. After rescuing the teacher, the two encountered Tom, who made love to her and won her promise to marry him. The corporal, who had fallen in love with her, resigned in favor of his younger brother and wished them well.

The commanding officer at the post started on a journey, and Tom lost no time in going to his home and resuming his love affair with the false wife. Forgetting some papers, the officer returned home, to find Tom and his wife drinking together and caressing each other. He lashed Tom with a dog whip, and Tom got possession of his revolver and shot him dead. Tom took the dead man's dog team and escaped into the wilds. The call of duty forced the corporal to pursue his brother. They met in a blizzard on a mountain side, and after a struggle the corporal was thrown down the mountain side. Tom found refuge in the cabin of the school-teacher, where later the corporal found him and placed him under arrest. In reply to his brother's entreaty the corporal could only answer, "I Am the Law."

The storm grew worse, and the corporal's exposure brought on pneumonia. He felt he was dying, and could not bear the thought of his widowed mother losing him by illness, and her younger son upon the gallows. So he had paper and pen brought him, and he wrote and signed a confession to the murder. Then he dropped back upon the cot, apparently dead; but with Joan's nursing he recovered. Exonerated by the confession, Tom returned to the settlement, presented the confession, and reported his brother as dead. But a trapper had stopped at Joan's cabin, perhaps a couple of weeks after Tom left it. He found the corporal sitting up and well. Upon arriving at the post, the trapper reported this, and Tom was sent back to arrest and bring in his brother, which he did.

The corporal was thrown into jail at the post, and was to be taken to a larger town for trial. But a mob formed, the corporal was dragged from the jail, and about to be lynched. Joan rushed to the widow of the murdered man, and pleaded with her to tell the truth and save the corporal. After a struggle with the woman she succeeded, got her out to the mob, and her confession was believed. The mob released the corporal and started back to get Tom, who saw them coming and committed suicide. The corporal and Joan were married, and we leave them starting on a honeymoon trip with their dog sled.

== Cast ==
- Alice Lake as Joan Cameron
- Kenneth Harlan as Cpl. Bob Fitzgerald
- Rosemary Theby as Mrs. George Mordeaux
- Gaston Glass as Tom Fitzgerald
- Noah Beery as Sgt. Georges Mordeaux
- Wallace Beery as Fu Chang

== Preservation ==
With no prints of I Am the Law located in any film archives, it is considered a lost film.
