= The Isle of Conquest =

1919 film

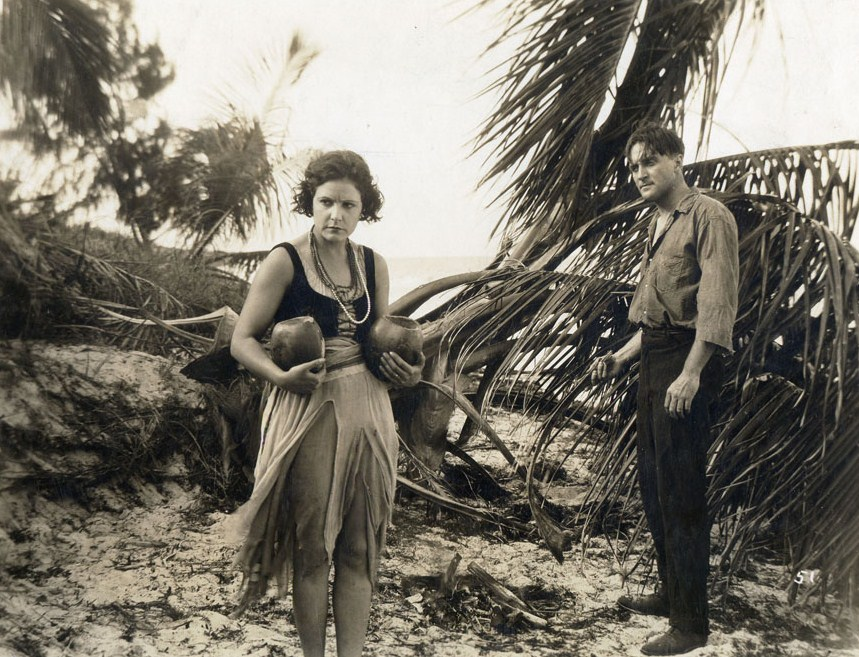
- Norma Talmadge and Wyndham Standing
- Directed by: Edward José
- Written by: John Emerson (scenario); Anita Loos (scenario)
- Based on: By Right of Conquest by Arthur Hornblow, Jr.
- Produced by: Joseph M. Schenck; Norma Talmadge
- Starring: Norma Talmadge
- Cinematography: David Abel
- Distributed by: Select Pictures
- Release date: October 26, 1919 (United States)
- Running time: 72 mins. 60 mins. (United States)
- Country: United States
- Language: Silent (English intertitles)

The Isle of Conquest is a 1919 American silent drama film starring Norma Talmadge and produced by Talmadge and her husband Joseph Schenck. The film is now considered lost.

== Plot ==
Based upon a short review in a film magazine, a young woman (Talmadge) marries a wealthy scoundrel so that her mother can live in luxury. While vacationing on his yacht, she becomes shipwrecked and is cast on a desert island with a stoker (Standing) for her companion. They eventually fall in love, but are rescued just before celebrating their wilderness-witnessed nuptials. Her husband later dies, so the lovers are then able to marry.

== Cast ==
- Norma Talmadge as Ethel Harmon
- Wyndham Standing as John Arnold
- Charles K. Gerrard as Van Surdam
- Hedda Hopper as Mrs. Harmon
- Natalie Talmadge as Janis Harmon
- Claire Whitney as Claire Wilson
- Gareth Hughes as Jack Frazier
- Joseph W. Smiley as Dr. Chase
- William Bailey
- Merceita Esmond

== See also ==
- List of lost films
