= A Reckless Romeo =

1917 film

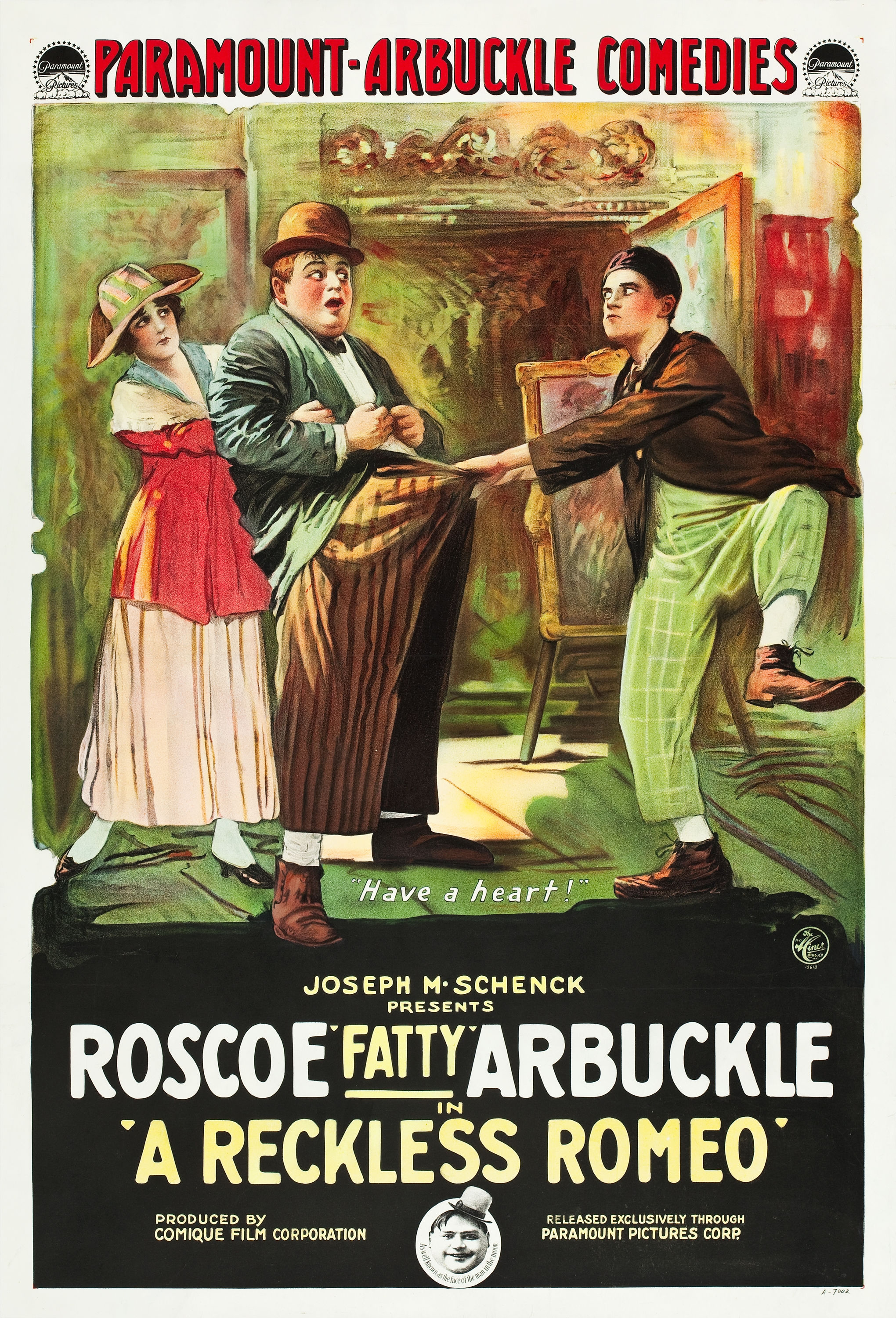
- Film poster
- Directed by: Roscoe "Fatty" Arbuckle
- Written by: Roscoe "Fatty" Arbuckle; Joseph Anthony Roach
- Starring: Roscoe "Fatty" Arbuckle
- Cinematography: Frank D. Williams
- Edited by: Herbert Warren
- Production company: Comique Film Corporation
- Distributed by: Paramount Pictures
- Release date: May 21, 1917
- Running time: 26 minutes (2-reels)
- Country: United States
- Language: Silent (English intertitles)

A Reckless Romeo is a 1917 American two-reel short silent comedy film directed by and starring Roscoe "Fatty" Arbuckle.

== Plot ==
A Norwegian print of A Reckless Romeo

A philandering husband's public flirtation with a beautiful girl—and the resulting brawl with the woman's boyfriend—are captured by a newsreel cameraman. When the husband takes his wife and her mother out to the movies, the footage is shown on-screen. The husband tries to flee the theater, only to be spotted and leaped upon by the woman's boyfriend, treating viewers to two simultaneous fights between the same two men, both on-screen and in the aisle.

== Cast ==
- Roscoe "Fatty" Arbuckle as Husband
- Al St. John as Rival
- Corinne Parquet as Wife
- Agnes Neilson as Mother-in-Law
- Alice Lake as Girl in Park
- Jimmy Bryant
- Joe Bordeaux as Newsreel director (uncredited)

== Production ==
The film was released by the Comique Film Corporation when it and many other early film studios in America's first motion picture industry were based in Fort Lee, New Jersey, at the beginning of the 20th century. Some shots were done at Palisades Amusement Park.

The film was originally produced in New Jersey as one of Arbuckle's last Keystone pictures. Filmed between July and September 1916 and later sold to Paramount, it was released as a Comique film on May 21, 1917, after The Butcher Boy and before The Rough House.

== Censorship ==
Before A Reckless Romeo could be exhibited in Kansas, the Kansas Board of Review required the elimination of a scene where a policeman loses his pants, and the two intertitles "I left our address with the stork," and "He never left that one."

== Preservation status ==
Thought to have been lost, until a damaged print was discovered in 1998 in the Norwegian Film Archive in an unmarked canister with another lost Arbuckle short, The Cook (1918). The film archive at George Eastman House has a 35 mm positive print.

== See also ==
- Fatty Arbuckle filmography
- List of rediscovered films
