= The Law and the Lady (1924 film) =

1924 silent film

- Directed by: John L. McCutcheon
- Written by: Lewis Allen Browne
- Produced by: Schuyler E. Grey
- Starring: Alice Lake; Tyrone Power Sr. Maurice Costello
- Production company: Marlborough Productions
- Distributed by: Aywon Film Corporation
- Release date: December 18, 1924
- Running time: 60 minutes
- Country: United States
- Languages: Silent; English intertitles

The Law and the Lady is a 1924 American silent drama film directed by John L. McCutcheon and starring Alice Lake, Tyrone Power Sr. and Maurice Costello.

== Cast ==
- Len Leo as Jack Langley
- Alice Lake as Marion Blake
- Mary Thurman as Minerva Blake
- Tyrone Power Sr. as John Langley Sr.
- Maurice Costello as Cyrus Blake
- Henry Sedley as Don Hollins
- Cornelius Keefe as Stephen Clark
- Joseph Depew as Office Boy
- Tom Blake as Bill Sims
- Joseph Burke as Butler
- Jack McLean as Hubert Townsend
- Rafaela Ottiano as Ma Sims

== Bibliography ==
- Robert B. Connelly. The Silents: Silent Feature Films, 1910-36, Volume 40, Issue 2. December Press, 1998.
