= The Lion's Den (1919 film) =

1919 film by George D. Baker

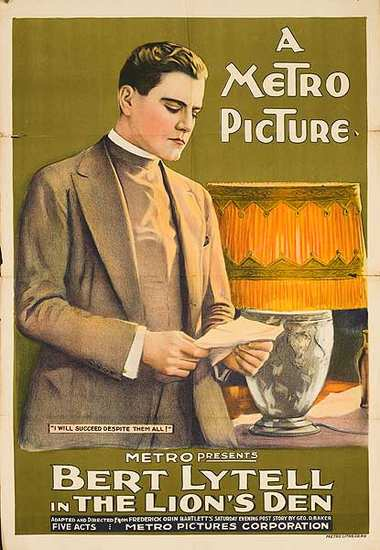
- Directed by: George D. Baker
- Written by: George D. Baker
- Produced by: Metro Pictures
- Starring: Bert Lytell
- Cinematography: Robert Kurrle
- Distributed by: Metro Pictures
- Release date: 19 May 1919
- Running time: 50 minutes
- Country: United States
- Language: Silent...English intertitles

The Lion's Den is a surviving 1919 American silent drama film directed by George D. Baker and starring Bert Lytell, Alice Lake and Edward Connelly. It was distributed by Metro Pictures.

== Cast ==
- Bert Lytell as Reverend Sam Webster
- Alice Lake as Dorothy Stedman
- Joseph Kilgour as Grocer Stedman
- Edward Connelly as Grocer Jarvis
- Augustus Phillips as Mr. Jones
- Howard Crampton as Mr. Blake
- Seymour Rose as Mr. Billings
- Alice Knowland as Smith Sister (as Alice Nowland)
- Nellie Anderson as Smith Sister (as Mother Anderson)

== Preservation status ==
- Copies exist at the UCLA Film & Television Archive and the British Film Institute.
