= Out West (1918 film) =

1918 film

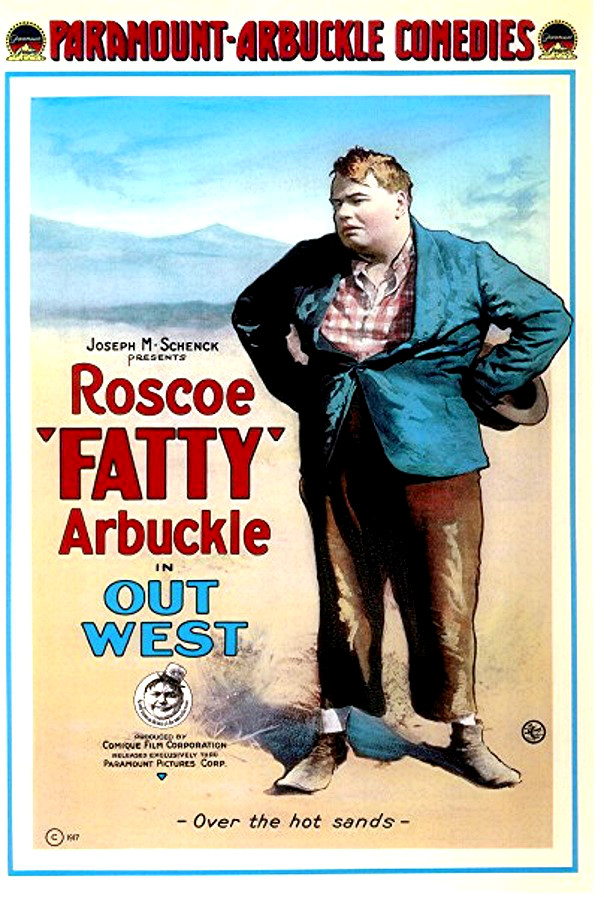
- Theatrical release poster
- Directed by: Roscoe Arbuckle
- Written by: Roscoe Arbuckle; Natalie Talmadge (story)
- Produced by: Joseph M. Schenck
- Starring: Roscoe Arbuckle; Buster Keaton; Al St. John; Alice Lake; Joe Keaton
- Cinematography: George Peters
- Edited by: Herbert Warren
- Distributed by: Paramount Pictures
- Release date: January 20, 1918
- Running time: 25 minutes
- Country: United States
- Languages: Silent; English intertitles

Out West is a 1918 American two-reel silent comedy film, a satire on contemporary Westerns, starring Roscoe "Fatty" Arbuckle, Buster Keaton, and Al St. John. It was the first of Arbuckle's "Comique" films to be filmed on the West Coast, the previous five having been filmed in and around New York City. The idea for the story came from Natalie Talmadge, who was later to become Keaton's first wife.

== Plot ==
Out West (1918)

A drifter who has caught a ride hiding in a train's water tank but is thrown off the train after being discovered stealing food from the passengers. He is chased by a group of Indians who intend to kill and eat him. He runs to a town called Mad Dog Gulch where he inadvertently foils a robbery attempt by Wild Bill Hickup and his gang after which the town sheriff appoints him the new bar tender of the local bar "The Last Chance Saloon".

Later Hickup returns, this time drunk and causing chaos in the bar. After he begins forcing himself on a young lady "Salvation Sue", The Bartender and the sheriff attempt to eject Hickup once again. When their attempts to knock him out by breaking bottles over his head and even shooting him in the back prove ineffective, they manage to subdue him by tickling him until he flees.

Humiliated, Hickup attempts to gain his revenge by kidnapping Sue and riding out of the town with her as his gang keep the bartender and the sheriff at bay. The bartender eventually breaks free and chases Hickup back to his shack as the Sheriff holds off Hickup's men. After once again subduing Hickup by tickling him, the bartender and Sue push his shack off a hill with him still inside.

== Cast ==
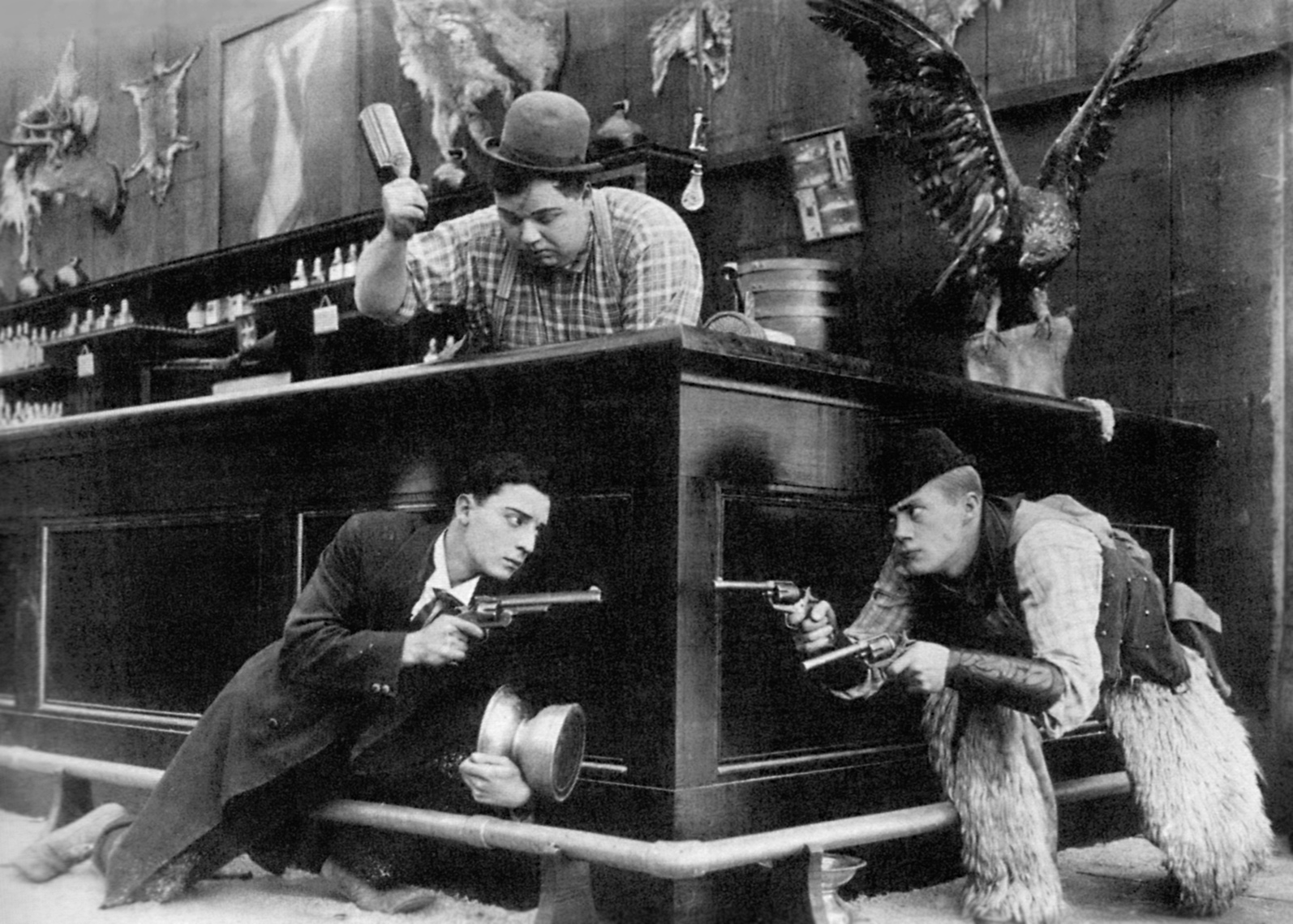
Buster Keaton, Roscoe "Fatty" Arbuckle and Al St. John in Out West

- Roscoe "Fatty" Arbuckle as Train Rider, Bartender
- Buster Keaton as Sheriff, saloon owner
- Al St. John as Wild Bill Hickup
- Alice Lake as Sue the Salvation Army lady
- Joe Keaton as Man on train
- Ernie Morrison Sr.

== Reception ==
Like many American films of the time, Out West was subject to cuts by city and state film censorship boards. For example, the Chicago Board of Censors required a cut of the scene of arrows in man's back and their removal, man burning back with gas flames, and the shooting of the bartender.

== Critical response ==
Variety gave the film a positive review in its January 25, 1918 issue, saying it "hits a better comedy tempo than any of his [Arbuckle's] recent productions." Keaton's comic tumbles were singled out for praise, as was Arbuckle's direction of the film: "Good camera work aids the comedy."

== See also ==
- List of American films of 1918
