= Joe Keaton =

American vaudeville actor

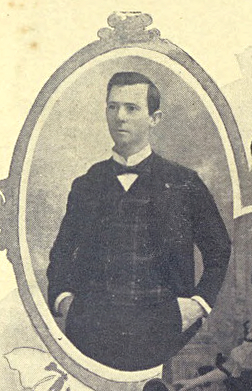
- Keaton in the early 1900s
- Born: Joseph Hallie Keaton; July 6, 1867; Terre Haute, Indiana, U.S.
- Died: January 13, 1946 (aged 78); Hollywood, Los Angeles, California, U.S.
- Resting place: Inglewood Cemetery, Inglewood, California
- Spouse: Myra Keaton (m. 1894)
- Children: 3, including Buster
- Relatives: Eleanor Keaton (daughter-in-law)

Joseph Hallie Keaton (July 6, 1867 – January 13, 1946) was an American vaudeville performer, eccentric dancer and silent film actor. He was the father of actor Buster Keaton and appeared with his son in several films.

== Life and career ==
Keaton was born a few miles south of Terre Haute, Indiana, to Libbie Jane and Joseph Francis Keaton IV. Leaving home in 1889, the year of the Land Rush, he homesteaded in the Oklahoma territory for a time, securing a claim three and a half miles northwest of Edmond. A few months into Keaton's residency, the neighboring homesteader (a Canadian whom Keaton had befriended on their shared journey west) was murdered and partially buried by a claim jumper; the body was subsequently discovered, and "justice was meted out" to the murderer by Keaton and a group of three or four men that included Robert Galbreath Jr.

On May 31, 1894, Joe Keaton eloped with Myra Edith Cutler, who became known as Myra Keaton. Myra performed with Joe in a vaudeville act called the Two Keatons. Joe and Myra's first child was Joseph Frank Keaton, who became known as the silent film actor Buster Keaton; their other children were Harry Keaton and Louise Keaton.

When Buster was only a few years old, he joined the act, which became the Three Keatons. The act was a rough-and-tumble one, with Buster being thrown around on stage most of the time. As the years went by, Joe Keaton became an alcoholic; when Buster was 21, Myra left him, taking Buster with her. However, after Buster found success in silent film, he supported Joe and gave him small parts in several movies. Myra and Joe reunited, but eventually split up again. He lived alone in a Hollywood hotel for many years. He stopped drinking with the help of a girlfriend who was a Christian Scientist.

== Death ==
Joe Keaton died on January 13, 1946, at his home in Hollywood after a long illness, according to the New York Times. However, Buster later said he was hit by a car, and state death records show that he died in Ventura. He was buried in Inglewood Cemetery in Inglewood, California, in an unmarked grave. In 2018, Keaton fans around the world raised the necessary funds and had the grave marked with a headstone.

== Filmography ==
=== Film ===
Year	Title	Role	Notes
1917	A Country Hero	Cy Klone, Garage Owner	Short
1918	Out West	Man on train	Short
1918	The Bell Boy	Guest	Short
1918	Good Night, Nurse!	Man in bandages	Short, uncredited
1920	The Scarecrow	Farmer	Short, uncredited
1920	Convict 13	Prisoner	Short
1920	Neighbors	His father	Short
1921	The Goat	Minor role	Short, uncredited
1922	The Electric House	Buster's Father in Prologue	Short, uncredited
1922	Day Dreams	The Girls Father	Short, uncredited
1923	Our Hospitality	The Engineer	
1924	Sherlock Jr.	The Girl's Father	
1925	Go West	Man in Barber Shop	Uncredited
1926	The General	Union General #1	
1928	Steamboat Bill, Jr.	The Coiffure	Unconfirmed, uncredited
1934	Evelyn Prentice	Court Reporter	Unconfirmed, uncredited
1935	Palooka from Paducah	Pa Diltz	Short (final film role)

=== Television ===
Year	Title	Role	Notes
2017	Compression	Unknown	Archive footage, posthumously released
