= Natalie Talmadge =

American actress (1896–1969)

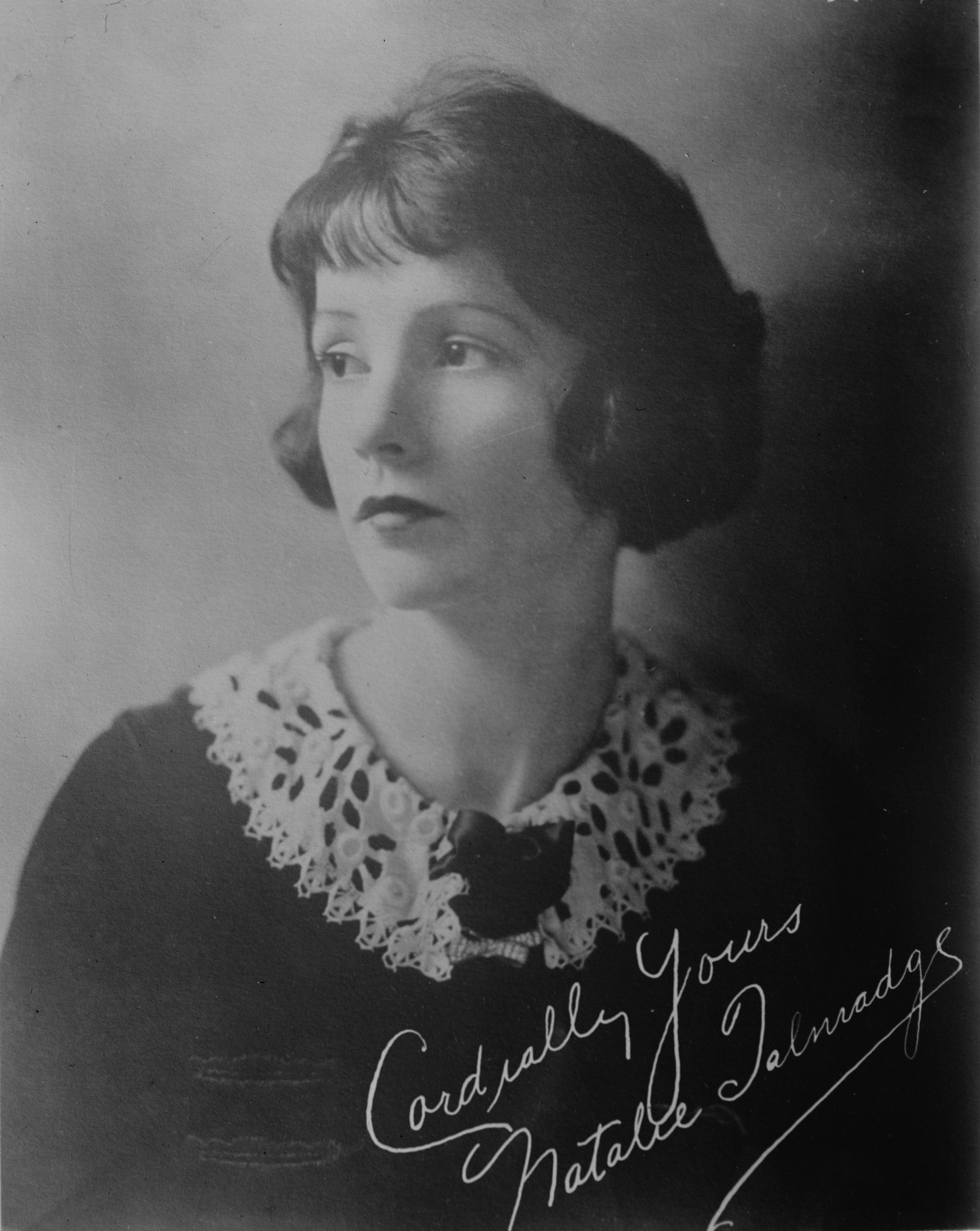
- Talmadge c. 1930s
- Born: April 29, 1896; New York City, U.S.
- Died: June 19, 1969 (aged 73); Santa Monica, California, U.S.
- Resting place: Hollywood Forever Cemetery
- Occupation: Actress
- Years active: 1916–1923
- Spouse: Buster Keaton (m. 1921; div. 1933)
- Children: 2
- Relatives: Norma Talmadge (sister); Constance Talmadge (sister)

Natalie Talmadge (April 29, 1896 – June 19, 1969) was an American silent film actress who was the wife of Buster Keaton and sister of the movie stars Norma and Constance Talmadge. She retired from acting in 1923.

== Early life and career ==
Talmadge was born in Brooklyn, New York to Margaret L. "Peg" and Frederick O. Talmadge. She was the younger sister of Norma Talmadge and the older sister of Constance Talmadge, both of whom became film actresses.

She appeared in D. W. Griffith's Intolerance (1916), The Passion Flower (1921) with her sister Norma, and Buster Keaton's Our Hospitality (1923), her final film appearance.

== Personal life ==
=== Marriage and children ===
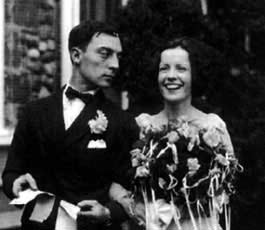
Talmadge and Buster Keaton on their wedding day, May 31, 1921

Talmadge married actor Buster Keaton on May 31, 1921, at her sister Norma's home in Bayside, Queens. She was Roman Catholic, but the marriage was performed as a civil ceremony.

They had two sons: Joseph Talmadge Keaton and Robert Talmadge Keaton. The couple lived a lavish lifestyle in Beverly Hills, Natalie spending prodigious amounts of money on clothes. After the birth of their second son, she decided not to have any more children, resulting in the couple staying in separate rooms. Keaton accepted this, and they agreed that he should keep any affairs discreet.

Late in the marriage, Keaton's career began to suffer after his contract with his brother-in-law Joseph M. Schenck was sold to Metro-Goldwyn-Mayer. After the couple's divorce was final on August 10, 1933, Talmadge changed their boys' names to "Talmadge". In June 1942, Robert and Joseph (then 18 and 20, respectively) made the name changes legal after their mother won a court petition.

== Later years and death ==
Natalie Talmadge was in frail health during her final years and was a resident of the Santa Monica Convalescent Home. She died of heart failure on June 19, 1969, at Santa Monica Hospital. She is buried in the Abbey of the Psalms in the Talmadge Room at Hollywood Forever Cemetery.

== Filmography ==
Year	Film	Role	Notes
1916	Intolerance	Favourite of the Harem	Uncredited
1917	His Wedding Night	Pretty Lady in Car	Short, uncredited
1917	A Country Hero	Unknown role, bit part	Short, lost film, uncredited
1918	Out West	—N/a	Writer only
1919	The Isle of Conquest	Janis Harmon	Lost film
1919	The Fall of Babylon	Favourite of the Harem	Archive footage, uncredited
1920	The Love Expert	Dorcas Winthrop	
1920	Yes or No?	Emma Martin	
1921	The Haunted House	Fainting Female Bank Customer	Short, uncredited
1921	The Passion Flower	Milagros	
1923	Our Hospitality	Virginia Canfield	Final film role
1924	Screen Snapshots, Series 5, No. 1	Self	Short
1939	Screen Snapshots Series 18, No. 12	Self	Short

== Sources ==
- Smith, Imogen Sara (2008). Buster Keaton: The Persistence of Comedy. Gambit Publishing. ISBN 978-0-9675917-4-2.
- Marion Meade (1995), Buster Keaton: Cut to the Chase, (ISBN 0-306-80802-1).
- 1900 United States Federal Census, Brooklyn Ward 8, Kings, New York; Roll T623_1047; Page: 4B; Enumeration District: 109.
- 1910 United States Federal Census, Brooklyn Ward 29, Kings, New York; Roll T624_982; Page: 13B; Enumeration District: 933; Image: 948.
