= Myra Keaton =

American actress (1877–1955)

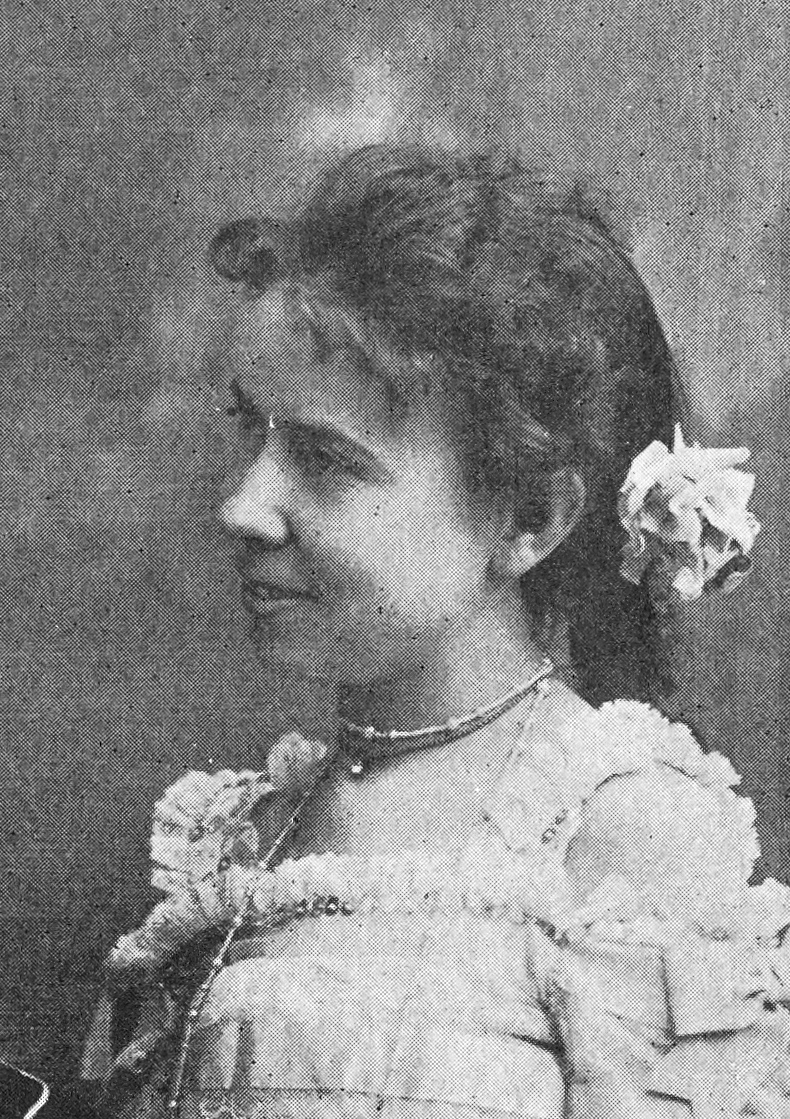
- Keaton in 1900s
- Born: Myra Edith Cutler; March 13, 1877; Modale, Iowa, U.S.
- Died: July 21, 1955 (aged 78); Los Angeles, California, U.S.
- Spouse: Joe Keaton (m. 1894; died 1946)
- Children: 3, including Buster

Myra Edith Keaton (née Cutler; March 13, 1877 – July 21, 1955) was an American vaudeville performer and film actress. She was the mother of actor Buster Keaton.

== Early life and career ==
Myra Keaton was born on March 13, 1877, in Modale, Iowa, the daughter of Frank Cutler and Sarah Elizabeth (née Shaffer). She had an older brother, Burt Melvin Cutler, and two younger half-brothers, Clinton M. Cutler and Marine (Mel) Cutler.

As teenagers, Myra and Burt traveled and performed with their father's medicine show. Joe Keaton joined the show while they traveled through Oklahoma Territory in 1893. Myra and Joe married on May 31, 1894, and began performing together in various medicine shows and vaudeville. Their children were actor Buster Keaton (né Joseph Frank Keaton), Harry Keaton and Louise Keaton. At the age of four, Buster officially joined the family's vaudeville act, which was billed as "The Three Keatons". Myra and Buster left the act in 1917, as a result of problems arising from Joe Keaton's drinking.

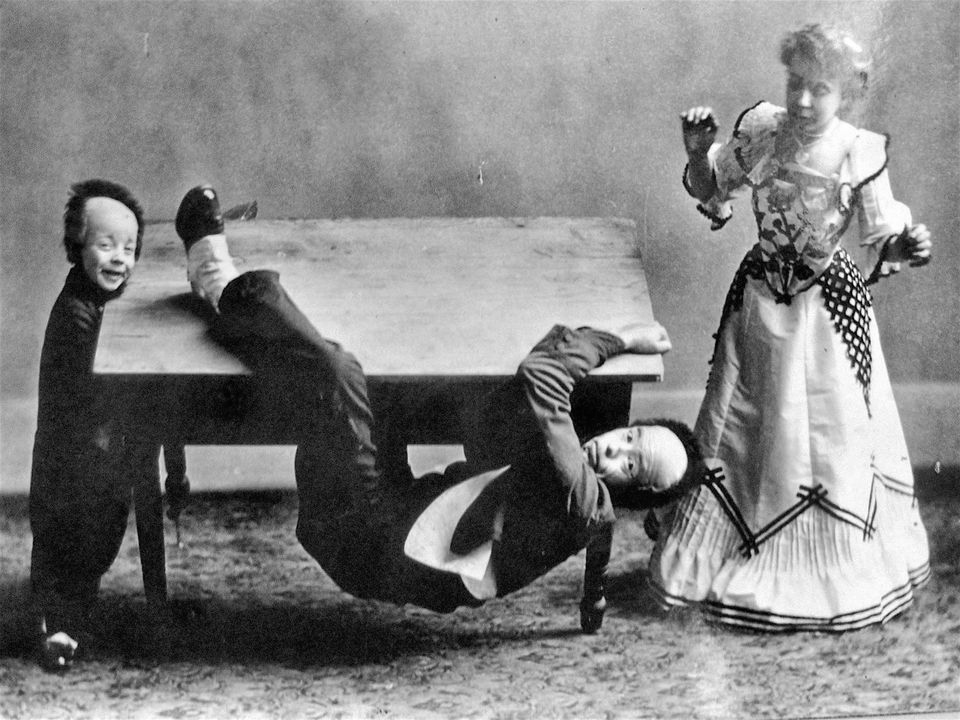
Six-year-old Buster Keaton (left) with his parents Myra (right) and Joe Keaton (middle) during a vaudeville act

All members of the Keaton family occasionally appeared in Buster's silent and sound comedies. Although estranged in later years, Myra remained married to Joe until Joe's death in 1946.

== Filmography ==
Year	Film	Role	Notes
1921	The Goat	Minor role	Short, uncredited
1922	The Electric House	Buster's Mother in Prologues	Short, uncredited
1935	Palooka from Paducah	Ma Diltz	Short
1935	Way Up Thar	Molly 'Maw' Kurtz	Short
1936	The Brain Busters		Short
1937	Love Nest on Wheels	Elmer's ma	Short
1963	The Sound of Laughter	Molly ‘Maw’ Kurtz (Hillbilly Smoking Pipe)	Archive footage, Posthumous release

== Death ==
Keaton died on July 21, 1955, in Los Angeles, California, aged 78. She is buried at Glen Haven Memorial Park in Sylmar, California.
