= Corinne Parquet =

American actress

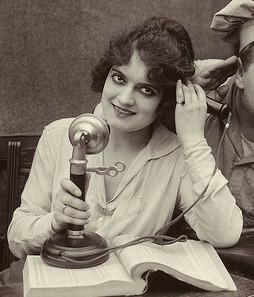
- Born: March 4, 1896
- Died: January 16, 1975 (aged 78)
- Occupation: Film actress
- Years active: 1916–1917

Corinne Parquet was an American actress who appeared in silent films with Roscoe "Fatty" Arbuckle.

== Biography ==
Parquet was from Rochester, New York. In 1916, she won a contest that started her film career.

She appeared in two films with Roscoe "Fatty" Arbuckle. Her first film was the Keystone Studios production The Waiters' Ball (1917). She was listed as Keystone's "leading comedienne" in an August 1916 article. Her second film was A Reckless Romeo (1917).

== Selected filmography ==
- The Waiters' Ball (1917 short) as the cashier
- A Reckless Romeo (1917 short) as the wife
