= The Dancing Cheat =

1924 film

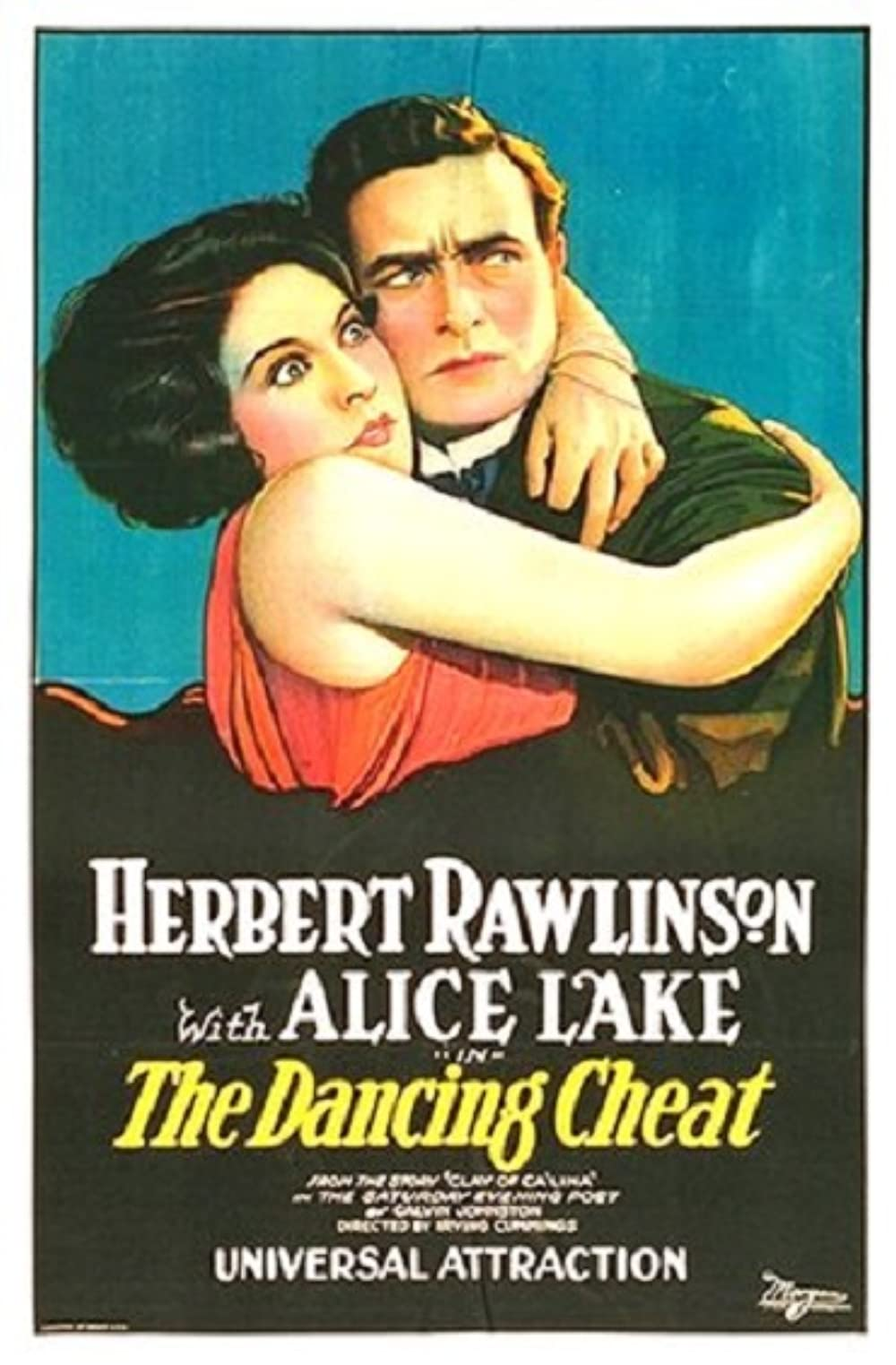
- Directed by: Irving Cummings
- Written by: Raymond L. Schrock
- Story by: Calvin Johnston
- Produced by: Carl Laemmle
- Starring: Herbert Rawlinson; Alice Lake; Robert Walker
- Cinematography: William Thornley
- Production company: Universal Pictures
- Distributed by: Universal Pictures
- Release date: April 7, 1924
- Running time: 50 minutes
- Country: United States
- Language: Silent (English intertitles)

The Dancing Cheat is a 1924 American silent drama film directed by Irving Cummings and starring Herbert Rawlinson, Alice Lake, and Robert Walker.

== Plot ==
As described in a film magazine review, Brownlow Clay, member of an old Southern family, runs a square gambling house in Tijuana. In a cafe he meets Poppy, a dancer and the wife of a crooked gambler named Kane, who is willing to go the limit in order to achieve her aim. When Clay refuses to respond to her advances, Poppy, enraged, enters into a scheme with her husband to blackmail him. Kane finds her in Clay's apartments and demands hush money. Poppy, ashamed of the part she is playing in this badger game and genuinely in love with Clay, relents, suffers remorse, and double-crosses her husband instead of Clay. With Kane out of the way, Clay and Poppy face a happy future together.

== Cast ==
- Herbert Rawlinson as Brownlow Clay
- Alice Lake as 'Poppy' Marie Andrews
- Robert Walker as Bobby Norton
- Jim Blackwell as Mose
- Ed Brady as 'Denker' Eddie Kane
- Harmon MacGregor as 'Moron Mike' Downs

== Preservation ==
An incomplete 35 mm copy of The Dancing Cheat is held by the George Eastman Museum.

== Bibliography ==
- Connelly, Robert B. The Silents: Silent Feature Films, 1910-36, Volume 40, Issue 2. December Press, 1998.
- Munden, Kenneth White. The American Film Institute Catalog of Motion Pictures Produced in the United States, Part 1. University of California Press, 1997.
