= A Creampuff Romance =

1916 film

- Directed by: Fatty Arbuckle
- Starring: Fatty Arbuckle
- Release date: July 5, 1916
- Country: United States
- Languages: Silent; English intertitles

A Creampuff Romance is a 1916 American short comedy film directed by and starring Fatty Arbuckle.

== Cast ==
- Roscoe "Fatty" Arbuckle
- Alice Lake
- Al St. John

== See also ==
- List of American films of 1916
- Fatty Arbuckle filmography
