= Good Night, Nurse! =

1918 American film directed by Roscoe Arbuckle

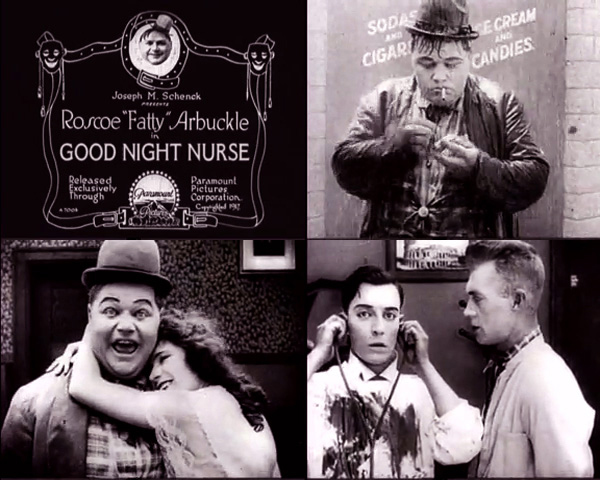
- Film stills
- Directed by: Roscoe Arbuckle
- Written by: Roscoe Arbuckle
- Starring: Roscoe Arbuckle; Buster Keaton
- Cinematography: George Peters
- Edited by: Herbert Warren
- Production company: Comique Film Company
- Distributed by: Paramount Pictures
- Release date: July 6, 1918
- Running time: 26 minutes
- Country: United States
- Language: Silent (English intertitles)

Good Night, Nurse! (1918) by Roscoe Arbuckle

Good Night, Nurse! is a 1918 American two-reel silent comedy film written by, and directed by, and starring Roscoe "Fatty" Arbuckle and featuring Buster Keaton. Roscoe's character's wife reaches the last straw with his drinking and admits him to the No Hope Sanatorium, which promises to cure all cases of alcoholism.

== Plot ==
A drunken Fatty walks the streets on a depressing, rainy night, too drunk to realize that he is being soaked by the rain. He is repeatedly denied entry to a drug store due to his drunken state and is forced to remain in the rain. He befriends a fellow drunk who he attempts to mail home by writing his address on his shirt, covering his face in stamps and placing him on top of a mailbox. He befriends a pair of street performers who play the National Anthem for him despite the pouring rain and as a reward he invites them to take shelter in his home from the rain. As Fatty parties in the living room with his newfound friends, his wife is awakened by the couple's pet monkey. Angered, his wife throws the street performers out and announces that she is sick of Fatty's drunken behavior. Reading about an operation rumored to cure alcoholism, she orders Fatty to undergo the operation or be thrown out of the house.

The hospital is revealed to be a sanitarium. Fatty is horrified when the doctor due to perform his operation, Dr. Hampton, emerges with his apron stained with blood. Fatty and a female patient attempt to escape, but are quickly apprehended. Doctors tell Fatty not to go near the girl again, claiming she is crazy. Fatty is taken to the operating room 13. As the doctors prepare for surgery, and after Fatty's attempt at postponing the surgery by slipping a clock into his shirt to make the doctors think he has an irregular heartbeat fails, Fatty is given anesthetic and falls unconscious.

Fatty awakes some time later and decides to escape from the sanitarium and bumps into the female patient from his earlier escape attempt. She tries to convince Fatty she is not crazy and that she has been mistakenly committed. They are pursued by doctors into the communal patients ward and a mass pillow fight breaks out between the inmates and the guards, allowing Fatty and the girl to escape. Once in the clear, Fatty asks the girl if there is anything else he can do for her. She asks him to help her get back into the sanitarium. Realizing the girl is genuinely crazy, Fatty ditches her by jumping into a nearby pond and pretending to drown, forcing the girl to go running for help. Doctors give chase and while attempting to flee, Fatty finds himself back at the sanitarium. Again he attempts to escape, this time by disguising himself as a nurse. With freedom in sight, Fatty runs into Dr. Hampton, who believes Fatty to be an actual woman and begins to flirt with him. Fatty goes along with it so as not to blow his cover. The nurse whose uniform Fatty is wearing soon arrives, blowing his cover. Fatty makes a break for it, pursued by Dr. Hampton across a farm and onto a track where a sponsored race is taking place. Fatty manages to beat the other runners to the finish line and is declared the winner. He is awarded the prize money, which he realizes he can use to buy alcohol, but the doctors track him down once again. Fatty attempts to run off one last time, but is wrestled to the ground by the doctors. The scene suddenly shifts back to the hospital bed with the doctors shaking Fatty awake after his operation, revealing the whole escape attempt to have been nothing more than a dream.

== Cast ==
The cast is listed in credits order.

- Roscoe 'Fatty' Arbuckle as Fatty
- Buster Keaton as Dr. Hampton/woman with umbrella
- Al St. John as Surgeon's Assistant
- Alice Lake as Crazy Woman
- Joe Bordeaux (credited as Joe Bordeau)
- Kate Price as Nurse
- Dan Albert as Butler / Hospital orderly (uncredited)
- Joe Keaton as Man in Bandages (uncredited)
- Snitz Edwards as Drunken Man (uncredited)

== Reception ==
The Moving Picture World praised Roscoe Arbuckle's athleticism, comedic chops, and characterization: "Really an acrobat of great strength... a born comedian as well... [Arbuckle] tears along through ridiculous incidents... like a baby elephant out for a romp and careless of consequences."

Like many American films of the time, Good Night, Nurse! was subject to cuts by city and state film censorship boards. For example, the Chicago Board of Censors cut, in Reel 1, Arbuckle kicking woman, Arbuckle putting foot on woman's posterior, and Arbuckle pulling dress off woman and exposing her figure.

== See also ==
- List of American films of 1918
- Fatty Arbuckle filmography
- Buster Keaton filmography
