= He Did and He Didn't =

1916 film by Roscoe Arbuckle

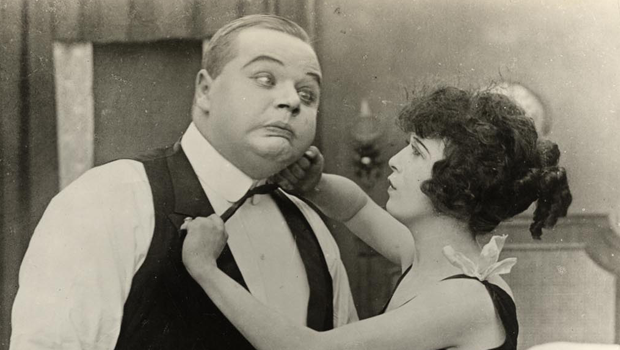
- Film still
- Directed by: Roscoe Arbuckle
- Written by: Roscoe Arbuckle (uncredited)
- Produced by: Mack Sennett (uncredited)
- Starring: Roscoe "Fatty" Arbuckle; Mabel Normand
- Cinematography: Elgin Lessley (uncredited)
- Production company: The Keystone Film Company
- Distributed by: Triangle Keystone; Mack Sennett Production
- Release date: January 30, 1916
- Running time: 20 minutes
- Country: United States
- Language: Silent (English intertitles)

He Did and He Didn't is a 1916 American silent short comedy film starring Roscoe "Fatty" Arbuckle and Mabel Normand.

== Production ==
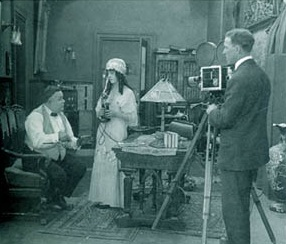
Elgin Lessley filming Roscoe Arbuckle and Mabel Normand on the set of He Did and He Didn't (1915)

He Did and He Didn't

The dark plot, extremely sophisticated for its time, involves a corpulent husband who finds himself consumed by jealousy when his wife's dashingly handsome old schoolmate unexpectedly turns up for dinner. The film was also written and directed by Arbuckle.

Because it was billed as a comedy, the ending attributes the assumptions of the husband, including the murder, to eating bad lobster. After several lighthearted comedies featuring Mabel Normand and Roscoe Arbuckle, this seemed to be an added dimension to film genre in general, in that it attributed serious jealousy fantasies to human nature, but still managed to maintain a cheerful demeanor overall in its approximate 20 minutes. It may be the first "dramedy" in existence.

The film was shot when many early film studios in America's first motion picture industry were based in Fort Lee, New Jersey, at the beginning of the 20th century.

== Cast ==
- Roscoe Arbuckle — The Doctor
- Mabel Normand — His Wife
- William Jefferson (credited as Wm. Jefferson) — Her Schoolmate
- Al St. John — A Bounding Burglar
- Joe Bordeaux — The Burglar's Accomplice (uncredited)

== Preservation ==
A 16 mm print of He Did and He Didn't is held by George Eastman House.

== See also ==
- List of American films of 1916
- Roscoe Arbuckle filmography
