= Alice Lake =

American actress (1895–1967)

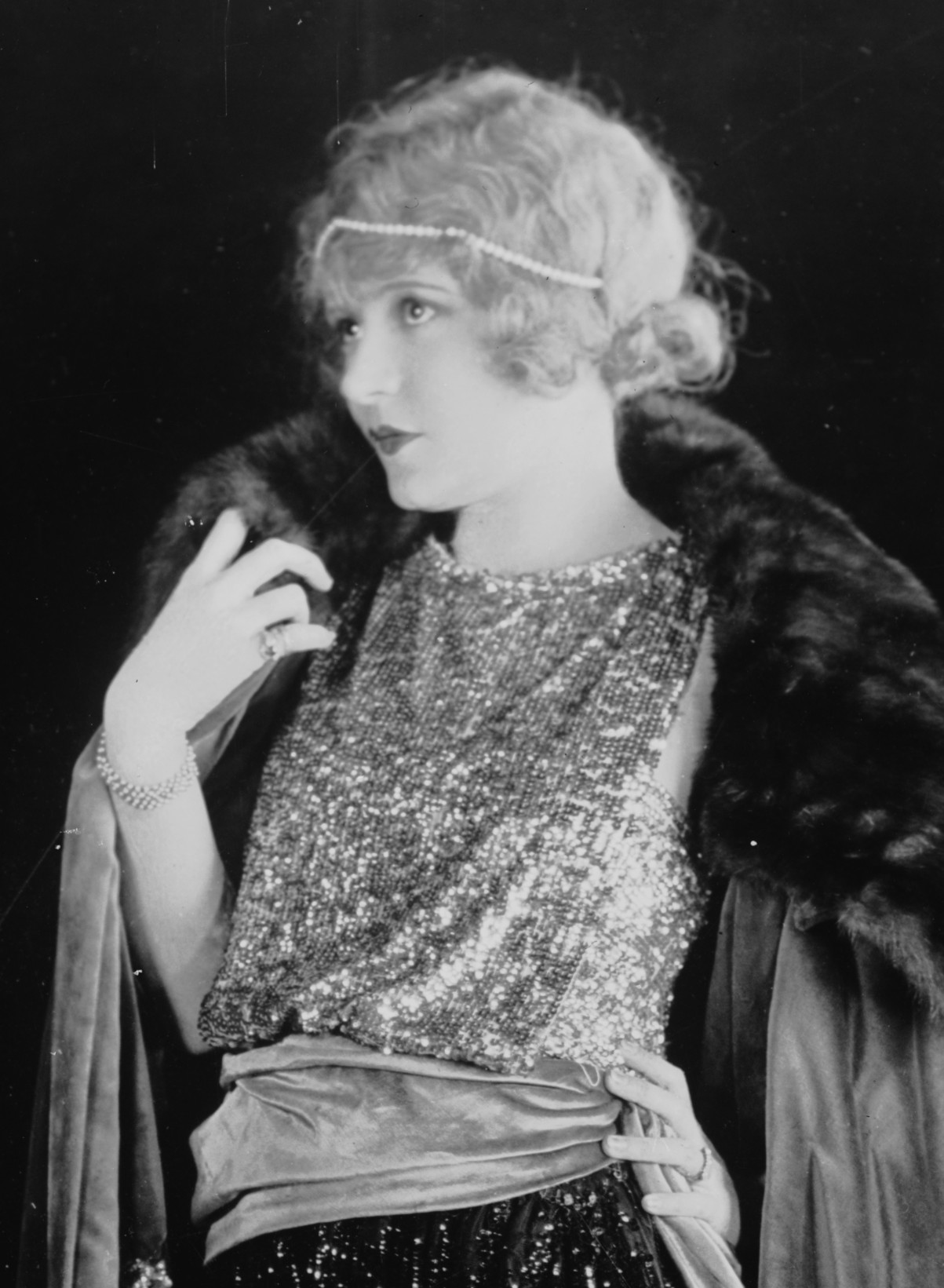
- Lake, 1921
- Born: September 12, 1895; Brooklyn, New York, U.S.
- Died: November 15, 1967 (aged 72); Hollywood, Los Angeles, California, U.S.
- Occupation: Actress
- Years active: 1912–1936
- Spouse: Robert Williams (m. 1924; div. 1925)
- Relatives: Anita Linda (niece)

Alice Lake (September 12, 1895 – November 15, 1967) was an American film actress who began her career during the silent film era and often appeared in comedy shorts opposite Roscoe "Fatty" Arbuckle.

== Career ==
Born in Brooklyn, New York, Lake began her career as a dancer. She made her screen debut in 1912, and she appeared in a number of comedy shorts by Mack Sennett. Lake was often the leading lady of Fatty Arbuckle in comedies such as Oh Doctor! (1917) and The Cook (1918). Arbuckle directed both films and was joined by Buster Keaton, who had a leading role in Oh Doctor!. Lake also played dramatic roles with Bert Lytell in Blackie's Redemption and The Lion's Den, both from 1919.

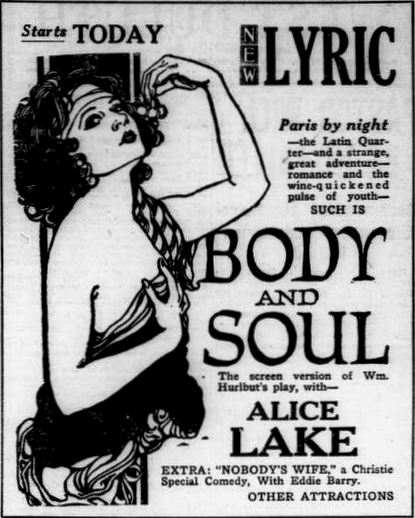

She starred in the 1920 film Body and Soul and appeared in a number of Metro silent film features in the 1920s as the lead actress. At the height of her career, she earned $1,200 per week as a motion picture actress. Lake had only limited success in dramatic roles. Following the introduction of talkies, her parts in films began to wane, and she only performed in supporting roles. Her last appearance in a film was in 1935 with a bit part in Frisco Kid. In all her screen credits numbered ninety-six.

== Personal life ==
In March 1924, Lake married fellow actor Robert Williams, but they were divorced in 1925. The couple separated and reunited three times before they permanently separated. Williams was a vaudeville performer who had appeared in a number of stage plays. He was previously married to singer Marion Harris. Lake was the aunt of Filipina actress Anita Linda.

== Death ==
Lake died of a heart attack at Paradise Sanitarium in Hollywood, California. She was 72. She was buried at Valhalla Memorial Park Cemetery in North Hollywood.

For her contribution to the motion picture industry, Alice Lake has a star on the Hollywood Walk of Fame at 1620 Vine Street.

== Selected filmography ==
Year	Title	Role	Notes
1916	The Moonshiners	Lady Jocelyn	
1916	The Waiters' Ball	A Fair Customer	
1916	A Creampuff Romance		Alternative title: His Alibi
1916	The Grab Bag Bride		
1917	The Butcher Boy		Uncredited
1917	A Reckless Romeo	Wife	Alternative title: A Creampuff Romance
1917	The Rough House	Mrs. Rough	
1917	His Wedding Night		
1917	The Texas Sphinx		
1917	Coney Island	Undetermined Role	Uncredited
1917	A Country Hero	Schoolteacher	Lost film
1918	Out West	Salvation Army Woman	Alternative title: The Sheriff
1918	The Bell Boy	Cutie Cuticle, manicurist	
1918	Moonshine	Moonshiner's Daughter	
1918	Good Night, Nurse!	Crazy Woman	
1919	Camping Out		
1919	The Lion's Den	Dorothy Stedman	
1919	A Desert Hero		Lost film
1919	Lombardi, Ltd.	Norah Blake	
1919	Blackie's Redemption	Mary Dawson	
1919	Full of Pep	Felicia Bocaz	
1920	The Misfit Wife	Katie Malloy	
1920	The Garage	Undetermined Role	Uncredited
1921	The Hole in the Wall	Jean Oliver	Lost film
1921	Over the Wire	Kathleen Dexter	
1922	More to Be Pitied Than Scorned	Viola Lorraine	Lost film
1922	Environment	Sally 'Chicago Sal' Dolan	
1922	I Am the Law	Joan Cameron	Unknown/presumably lost
1923	Broken Hearts of Broadway	Bubbles Revere	
1923	Modern Matrimony	Patricia Waddington	
1923	The Unknown Purple	Jewel Marchmont	
1924	The Law and the Lady	Marion Blake	
1924	The Dancing Cheat	'Poppy' Marie Andrews	
1925	The Price of Success	Ellen Harden	
1926	Broken Homes	Arline	
1926	The Truth About Men	Dora	
1926	The Wives of the Prophet	Judith	
1926	The Hurricane	The Wife	
1927	The Angel of Broadway	Goldie	Lost film
1927	Roaring Fires	Sylvia Summers	Lost film
1928	Runaway Girls	Agnes Brady	Lost film
1929	Untamed Justice	Ann	
1934	The Girl from Missouri	Paige's Manicurist	Uncredited
1934	Babes in Toyland	Townswoman	Uncredited
1935	Frisco Kid	Undetermined Role	Uncredited
