= The Scribe (film) =

The Scribe is a 1966 comedy film short starring Buster Keaton in his last film role before his death from lung cancer on February 1, 1966. It was produced by the Construction Safety Association of Ontario, Canada to promote construction site safety, and was filmed where the Ontario Government Buildings were under construction in Toronto. The director was John Sebert.

Keaton portrays the janitor at a newspaper who accidentally intercepts a call from the editor, ordering him to do a story about safety practices at a massive construction site. He sneaks onto the construction site and finds a list of 16 safety rules posted on a wall. He takes the list and attempts to confront workers when he sees them acting in an unsafe manner, often causing more accidents than he prevents. Keaton is silent throughout the film as he recreates several routines from his youth. Most notable was his recreation of a gag from the 1918 film The Bell Boy, in which Fatty Arbuckle mops the floor using only the tip of the mop, little by little while sitting on the floor.
