= The Cook (1918 film) =

1918 film by Roscoe Arbuckle

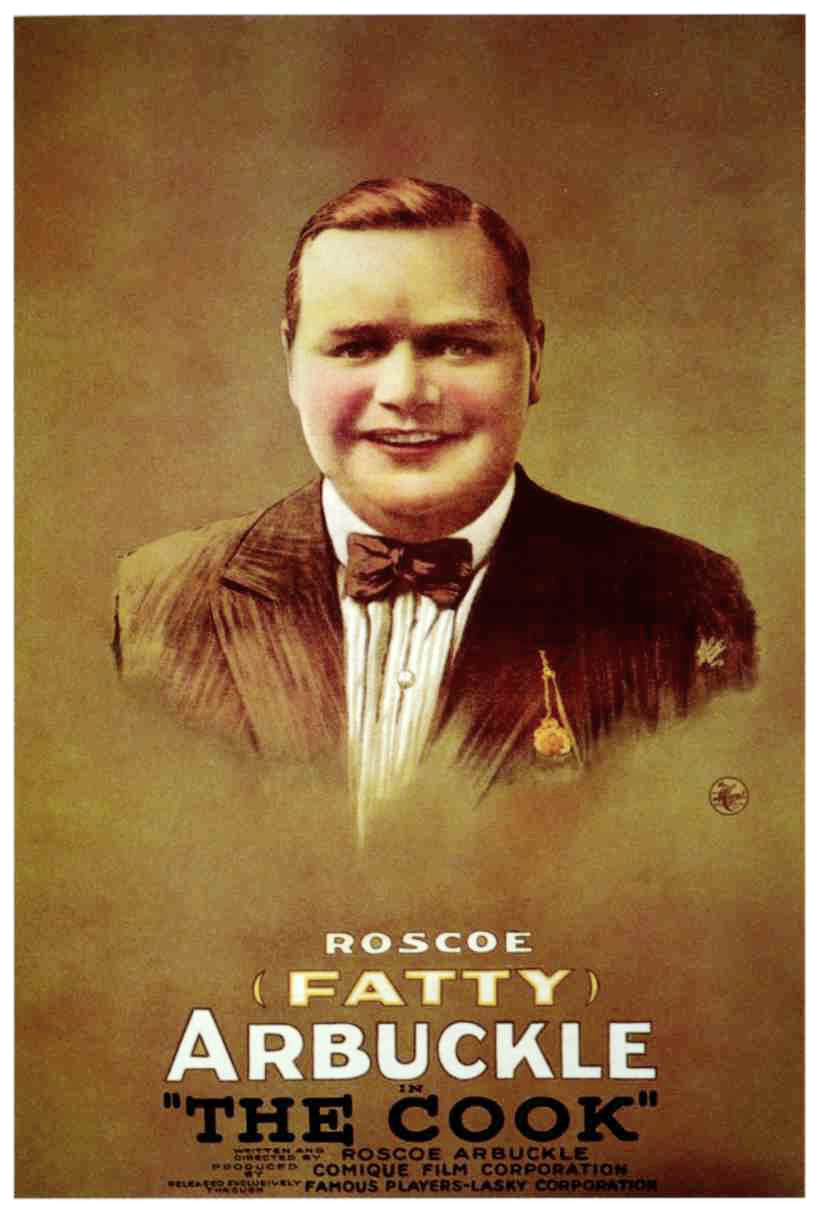
- Film poster
- Directed by: Roscoe Arbuckle
- Written by: Roscoe Arbuckle
- Produced by: Joseph M. Schenck
- Starring: Roscoe Arbuckle; Buster Keaton; Al St. John; Alice Lake; Glen Cavender
- Cinematography: George Peters
- Edited by: Herbert Warren
- Distributed by: Paramount Pictures
- Release date: September 15, 1918
- Running time: 22 minutes
- Country: United States
- Language: Silent (English intertitles)

The film

The Cook is a 1918 American two-reel silent comedy film written by, directed by, and starring Roscoe "Fatty" Arbuckle and featuring Buster Keaton and Al St. John. The movie is a slapstick comedy and focuses on goings-on at a high-end restaurant with Arbuckle as the Cook and Keaton as the Waiter.

The film is notable for a scene spoofing the 1918 Theda Bara film Salomé, with Arbuckle dancing around with a length of sausage links and pots and pans. It also contains many of Arbuckle's favorite food gags and some well-received work by Keaton. It was filmed at The Pike and the Balboa Amusement Producing Company.

== Plot ==
Fatty is the head chef at the "Bull Pup" restaurant where Keaton serves as the head waiter. One evening while service is in full flow Keaton and Fatty entertain the crowd with their dancing (despite breaking most of the plates and bottles in the restaurant in the process). The fun is soon spoiled when a "Holdup Man" comes in and begins ruining everyone's good time and dancing with the waitress against her will. Fatty, Keaton and the manager are no match for Holdup Man but he is subsequently scared off by Luke, Fatty's dog. Later, Fatty and Keaton join a pair of gentlemen in the restaurant for a big plate of spaghetti, not being able to replicate the correct way of eating it they resort to their own methods of eating one string at a time and cutting the pasta with scissors to make it shorter.

The next day Fatty plans a fishing trip with Luke while Keaton simultaneously takes the waitress on a date to the amusement park. Fatty takes a shortcut through the park and knocks several people out with his exceptionally long fishing rod before arriving on the beach. The waitress gets separated from Keaton and is chased around the park by Holdup Man and ends up falling off the top of a roller coaster, falling into the sea. Holdup Man is chased off by Luke yet again and Fatty and Keaton attempt to rescue the waitress but find that the key to a flotation device is in a "courthouse one mile east". Acting fast, they grab a rope to throw to the waitress but Keaton falls off the pier still holding the rope and drags Fatty in with him.

== Cast ==
- Roscoe "Fatty" Arbuckle - Chef
- Buster Keaton - Assistant Chef
- Al St. John - Holdup Man
- Alice Lake - Waitress / Cashier
- Glen Cavender
- Luke the Dog

== Preservation status and restoration ==
The film was believed to be a lost film for several decades before a damaged nitrate print was uncovered in the Norwegian Film Archive in 1998 in an unmarked canister with A Reckless Romeo (1917). Another print, with 600 additional feet of footage (about eight minutes), was found in the EYE Film Institute Netherlands in 2002, and the two were combined, using the synopsis from the Library of Congress as a guide to create the restored version, although there are still missing scenes. This version is currently available on the DVD The Cook and Other Treasures.

== See also ==
- List of American films of 1918
- List of rediscovered films
