= Palooka from Paducah =

1935 film

- Directed by: Charles Lamont
- Written by: Glen Lambert
- Produced by: E. H. Allen; E. W. Hammons
- Starring: Buster Keaton
- Cinematography: Dwight Warren
- Release date: January 11, 1935
- Running time: 20 minutes
- Country: United States
- Language: English

Palooka from Paducah is a 1935 American short comedy film featuring Buster Keaton, whose parents and sister also appear in the film, as his character's parents and sister.

== Plot ==
The struggling Diltz family of farmers decide to set up their own wrestling company as a way to generate money after the end of Prohibition. The father of the family (Joe Keaton) gets his son Jim (Buster Keaton) to help him train his brother Elmer (Robinson) up to be the best wrestler he can be. They hold an open challenge at their first event for anyone to step up and face Dewey, which is answered by established wrestler Bullfrog Kraus (Montana). Before the match, the father appoints Jim as the referee to ensure that Elmer is not seriously hurt. Kraus dominates the fight and hits Jim and his mother (Myra Keaton) out of spite. This makes Elmer angry who is able to make a comeback and sends Kraus crashing through the ring to win the match.

== Cast ==
- Buster Keaton as Jim Diltz
- Joe Keaton as Pa Diltz
- Myra Keaton as Ma Diltz
- Louise Keaton as Sis Diltz
- Dewey Robinson as Elmer Diltz
- Bull Montana as Bullfrog Kraus

== See also ==
- Buster Keaton filmography
