= Elgin Lessley =

American cinematographer

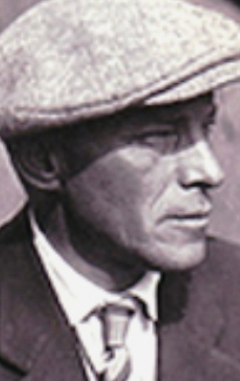
- Lessley in 1915
- Born: June 10, 1883; Higbee, Missouri
- Died: February 8, 1944 (aged 61); Los Angeles, California
- Resting place: Forest Lawn Memorial Park, Glendale, California
- Other names: Elgin Lesly; Elgin Lessly; Elgin Leslie
- Occupation: Cinematographer
- Years active: 1911–1928
- Known for: Special Effects
- Notable work: Sherlock Jr., The Playhouse
- Spouse: Blanche Olmstead (m. 1918)

Elgin Lessley (also credited as Lesly, Lessly, and Leslie) (June 10, 1883 – January 10, 1944) was an American hand-crank cameraman of the silent film era—a period of filmmaking when virtually all special effects work had to be produced inside the camera during filming. Though Lessley worked earlier with Roscoe "Fatty" Arbuckle, and later with Harry Langdon, he is best known for the groundbreaking effects he produced with Buster Keaton, who dubbed him "the human metronome" for his ability to crank consistently at any requested speed.

Lessley's most striking effects were in The Playhouse (1921) and Sherlock Jr. (1924). In The Playhouse, through use of a specially shuttered lens and repeated back-cranking and re-cranking, Lessley allowed Keaton to appear as up to nine characters simultaneously, interacting with one another. In Sherlock Jr., Lessley's careful positioning of camera and actor in various locations produced the effect of a man stuck in a movie where his location keeps changing as he struggles to keep up. Lessley retired from filmmaking after shooting The Cameraman with Buster Keaton in 1928.

== Early life ==
Elgin Lessley was born on June 10, 1883, to Orpha (née Brooks) and Shelton Lessley, joining a household with sisters Annette ("Nettie") and Ora, uncles Herbert and Claude Brooks, and grandfather Burton Brooks. Another sister, Bindy, also joined the family.

Shelton, a Confederate Army veteran, farmed and operated a general store with two sons from a previous marriage.

In 1910, the family relocated to Colorado Springs, Colorado, where Elgin worked as a window trimmer in the family's department store. After Shelton's death in 1911, the family relocated to Los Angeles.

Lessley possibly met his wife, Blanche Olmstead, in Colorado. They married in 1918, and at some point the couple settled in Culver City, California.

== Early career ==
In 1911, at the age of 28, Lessley became a cameraman for American Wildwest, the recently renamed American branch of Star Film Company operated by French filmmaker Gaston Méliès, brother of Georges Méliès. American Midwest made one-reel Westerns, most of which are now lost. Lessley isn't known to be credited on any of these films, so it is difficult to determine which ones he worked on.

Filming was done entirely outdoors, including interior scenes which were shot on sets built outside and topped with cotton screens to control the sunlight. Thus, Lessley got his start in cinematography in outdoor settings, ideal for working later with Arbuckle and Keaton, who preferred location shoots to studio shoots.

Gaston Méliès took his film company touring in the South Seas and Asia in the summer of 1912. Lessley joined them in Yokohama in April 1913. He worked there briefly on short documentaries. Again, lacking screen credits, it is difficult to determine exactly which films Lessley himself shot, but likely candidates include A Japanese Funeral, Home Life in Japan, and The Rice Industry in Japan.

Méliès wound down the tour and sent his crew back to the United States on May 10, 1913. Lessley returned to Los Angeles, near his sister Nettie, and went to work for Mack Sennett at Keystone Studios.

== The Sennett years ==
Lessley joined Keystone Studios in 1913. Since most early silent films are lost, and cameramen often weren't credited on-screen anyway, it's impossible to determine for certain which films Lessley shot. His first screen credit is for The Waiters' Ball in 1916, but Lessley was seen (and photographed) working on He Did and He Didn't with Roscoe Arbuckle and Mabel Normand in late 1915. Picture Play writer Will Rex described the workaday life Lessley was part of:

The studio was bristling with activity. Roscoe Arbuckle ... was superintending the construction of a set, aided by Ferris Hartman, his co-worker, and a dozen prop men; Elgin Lessley, the intrepid camera man, who has the reputation of turning out the clearest films of any Keystone crank turner, was loading his magazines. A dozen rough and ready comedians were practicing falls down a stairway.

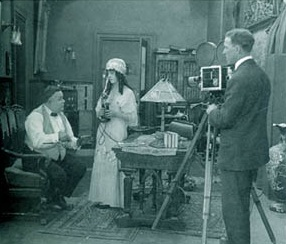
Lessley filming Roscoe Arbuckle and Mabel Normand on the set of He Did and He Didn't (1915)

Lessley was on the payroll for $55 per week (compared to Normand's $500 weekly salary, and the head carpenter's $35.), and Arbuckle evidently worked him hard for his money, shooting 10,000 - 15,000 feet of film for a single two-reel comedy.

The rough and tumble atmosphere on an Arbuckle shoot likely went far in preparing Lessley for his later work with Buster Keaton, who had standing orders for his cameramen to keep filming his risky stunts no matter what, until he either yelled "Cut" or was killed.

Arbuckle launched his own studio, Comique, with Joseph Schenck in 1917. Lessley wasn't part of the original Comique crew, but was busy on other Sennett films. He shot a number of movies starring Arbuckle's nephew, Al St. John, including A Self-Made Hero, The Stone Age, and A Winning Loser. He also did The Dangers of a Bride with Gloria Swanson, and A Clever Dummy with Ben Turpin.

== The Comique years ==
Arbuckle had already recruited Buster Keaton, and when Lessley came aboard Comique in 1918, he began their working relationship with The Bell Boy. Lessley filmed Arbuckle, Keaton, St. John, and Arbuckle's dog Luke in the subsequent Comique films, Backstage (1919), The Hayseed (1919), and The Garage (1920).

Though busy with Comique, Lessley also continued to work with Gloria Swanson, filming Her Decision and You Can't Believe Everything. He also filmed Pauline Stark in Irish Eyes, The Atom, Daughter Angele, and Alias Mary Brown.

== The Keaton years ==
Once Arbuckle moved to feature films in 1920, Keaton took over the old Comique studio, renamed Buster Keaton Studios, and retained Lessley as his cameraman. Lessley shot all 19 of Keaton's shorts, and six of Keaton's feature films. It was in his work for Keaton that Lessley pushed the limits of special effects.

=== The Playhouse ===
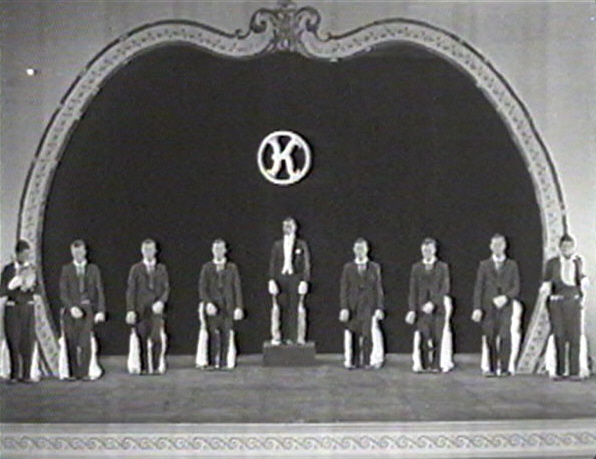
Keaton as nine members of a minstrel show in the opening of The Playhouse (1921)

When filming The Playhouse in 1921, Keaton was recovering from a broken ankle, and thus was unable to perform his usual death-defying and physically punishing stunts. He decided to focus instead on special effects. He and Lessley went to work on seeing how many Keatons could appear simultaneously using multiple exposure.

Multiple exposures were nothing new. Keaton had used them as early as 1918, in Moonshine, with cinematographer George Peters. The cameraman would mask half the lens, film half of the shot, then back-crank, switch the masking, and film the other half of the shot. Keaton and Lessley used this tried-and-true method to film two characters at a time for The Playhouse. At first Lessley balked at the idea of filming more than two Keatons in a single frame of film. Keaton turned his mechanical mind to work and provided Lessley with a workable system.

He built a shuttered box for the camera, with nine slats Lessley could open one by one. Lessley would open the first shutter, film Keaton's performance on the first mark, then close the shutter and back-crank to the starting point. He would then position Keaton on his next mark, open the next shutter, and crank the second character's performance. They used a metronome and a banjo player on the set to help Keaton keep the rhythm and match each performance to the others.
