= Blaze Away =

Blaze Away may refer to

- Blaze Away (album) by British band Morcheeba
- Blaze Away!, popular marching tune by Abe Holzmann
- Blaze Away (1922 film) directed by William Hughes Curran and starring Guinn "Big Boy" Williams
- "Blaze Away" (song), lyrics added to Holzman's march by Jimmy Kennedy
