= Steamboat Bill =

1910 song by The Leighton Brothers

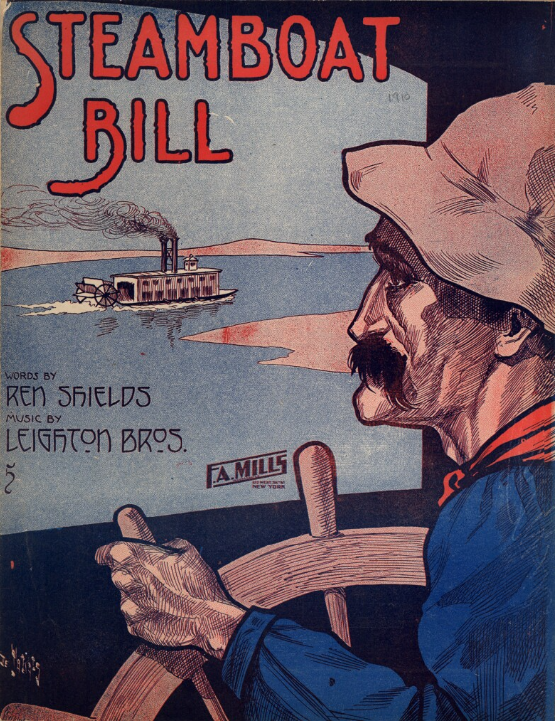

Single by Leighton Brothers
- Recorded: 1911
- Genre: Ragtime
- Length: 4:15
- Label: U.S. Everlasting Records
- Songwriter: Ren Shields

Audio
- "Steamboat Bill", performed by Arthur Collins (1911): file; help

"Steamboat Bill" is a 1910 song with music by the vaudeville group the Leighton Brothers and lyrics by Ren Shields. It became one of the first hit recordings in the United States through its 1911 recording by Arthur Collins, mostly known as the music in Disney's Steamboat Willie, the first released Mickey Mouse sound cartoon. Steamboat Bill also appeared in the 1928 Buster Keaton film Steamboat Bill, Jr.

== Content ==
The song is an extended reference to a famed 1870 race down the Mississippi River between two steamboats, the Robert E. Lee and the Natchez.

It imagines a fictional steamboat, the Whippoorwill, captained by "Mr. Steamboat Bill," who is determined to beat the record of the Robert E. Lee. He commands his mates to use cargo as fuel if they run out of coal. In some versions of the song, either the captain or the crew is threatened with death if the boat is not fast enough.

A gambler from Louisville, Kentucky (home of the Kentucky Derby) places a bet against Bill that the Whippoorwill will be unable to beat the record. Bill's obsession with speed causes the steam engine to explode, killing them both. The final verses imagine Bill and the gambler ascending to heaven, and his wife telling their children she will seek out a new husband in the railroad industry (a reference to "The Ballad of Casey Jones").

== Analysis ==
A 1965 article in the Journal of American Folklore refers to it as a "pseudo-Negro" song and a parody of "The Ballad of Casey Jones". More recently, R. John Brockmann has called into question the time period the song is set in, pointing out that boiler explosions had not been considered an issue for steamboat captains since the 1880s. Brockmann suggests that the song recalls memories of the mid-19th century when such explosions were common.

== Recordings ==
Arthur Collins, a ragtime singer, sang for the first recording in 1911. The song was a longtime hit in Tin Pan Alley and was covered as late as 1951, by the Delmore Brothers.

== Cultural impact ==
Mickey Mouse whistling a verse from Steamboat Bill, in Steamboat Willie.

Bolstered by the Buster Keaton and Mickey Mouse references, the song created lasting interest in steamboats and showboats. At least one showboat was actually named after the fictional Whippoorwill. This boat met a disastrous fate when it was hit by the 1978 Whippoorwill tornado, killing 16 passengers and crew.

Mickey Mouse whistling a verse from "Steamboat Bill" in Steamboat Willie has been used as the production logo of Walt Disney Animation Studios since 2007.
