= Frankie and Johnny (song) =

Folk song

"Frankie and Johnny" (sometimes spelled "Frankie and Johnnie"; also known as "Frankie and Albert", "Frankie's Man", "Johnny", or just "Frankie") is a murder ballad, a traditional American popular song. It tells the story of a woman, Frankie, who finds her man Johnny having sex with another woman and shoots him dead. Frankie is then arrested; in some versions of the song she is also executed.

== History ==
The song was inspired by one or more actual murders. One of these took place in an apartment building located at 212 Targee Street in St. Louis, Missouri, at 2:00 on the morning of October 15, 1899. Frankie Baker (1876–1952), a 22-year-old woman, shot her 17-year-old lover Allen (also known as "Albert") Britt in the abdomen. Britt had just returned from a cakewalk at a local dance hall, where he and another woman, Nelly Bly (also known as "Alice Pryor" and no relation to the pioneering reporter who adopted the pseudonym Nellie Bly or the "Nelly Bly" who was the subject of an 1850 song by Stephen Foster), had won a prize in a slow-dancing contest. Britt died of his wounds four days later at the City Hospital. On trial, Baker claimed that Britt had attacked her with a knife and that she acted in self-defense; she was acquitted and died in a Portland, Oregon mental institution in 1952.

In 1899, popular St Louis balladeer Bill Dooley composed "Frankie Killed Allen" shortly after the Baker murder case. The first published version of the music to "Frankie and Johnny" appeared in 1904, credited to and copyrighted by Hughie Cannon, the composer of "Won't You Come Home Bill Bailey"; the piece, a variant version of whose melody is sung today, was titled "He Done Me Wrong" and subtitled "Death of Bill Bailey".

The song has also been linked to Frances "Frankie" Stewart Silver, convicted in 1832 of murdering her husband Charles Silver in Burke County, North Carolina. Unlike Frankie Baker, Silver was executed.

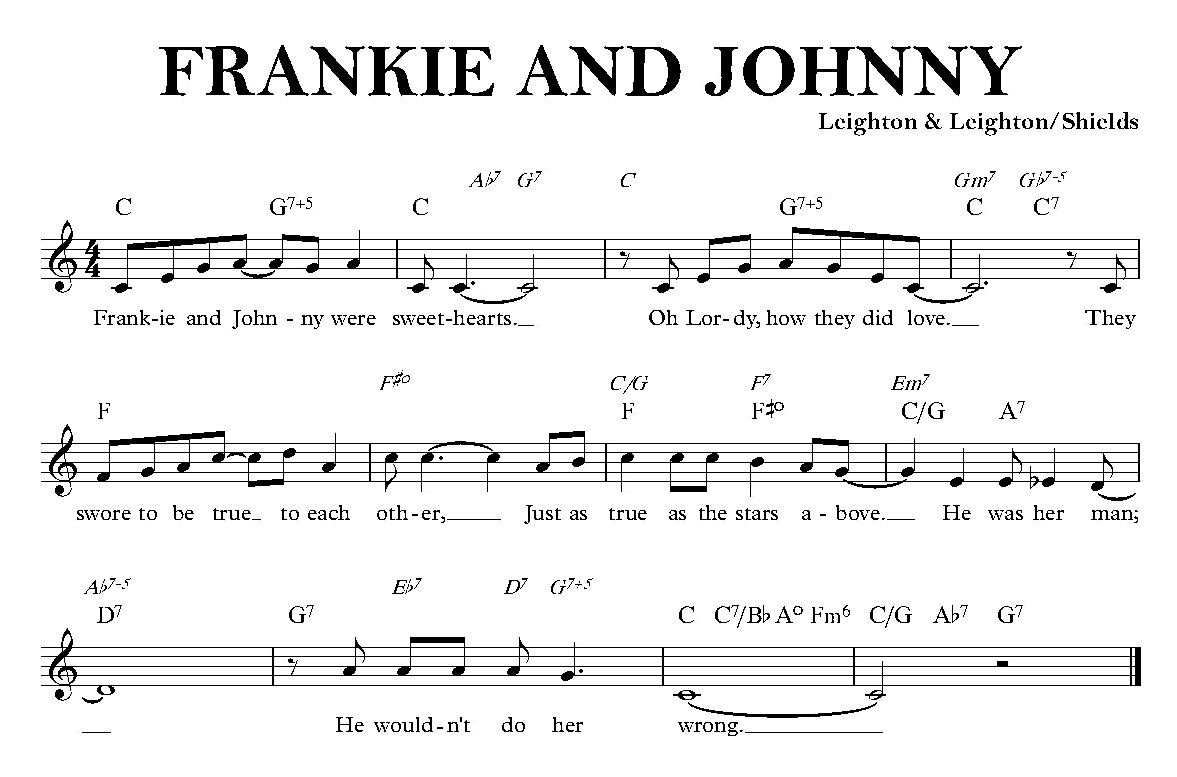
First page of the sheet music

Another variant of the melody, with words and music credited to Frank and Bert Leighton, appeared in 1908 under the title "Bill You Done Me Wrong"; this song was republished in 1912 as "Frankie and Johnny", this time with the words that appear in modern folk variations:

Frankie and Johnny were sweethearts
They had a quarrel one day
Johnny he vowed that he would leave her
Said he was going away
He's never coming home

Also:

Frankie took aim with her forty-four
Three times with a rooty-toot-toot

The 1912 "Frankie and Johnny" by the Leighton Brothers and Ren Shields also identifies "Nellie Bly" as the new girl to whom Johnny has given his heart. What has come to be the traditional version of the melody was also published in 1912, as the verse to the song "You're My Baby", with music is attributed to Nat. D. Ayer.

The familiar "Frankie and Johnny were lovers" lyrics first appeared (as "Frankie and Albert") in On the Trail of Negro Folksongs by Dorothy Scarborough, published in 1925; a similar version with the "Frankie and Johnny" names appeared in 1927 in Carl Sandburg's The American Songbag.

Several students of folk music have asserted that the song long predates the earliest published versions; according to Leonard Feather in his Biographical Encyclopedia of Jazz it was sung at the Siege of Vicksburg (1863) during the American Civil War and Sandburg said it was widespread before 1888, while John Jacob Niles reported that it emerged before 1830. The fact, however, that the familiar version did not appear in print before 1925 is "strange indeed for such an allegedly old and well-known song", according to music historian James J. Fuld, who suggests that it "is not so ancient as some of the folk-song writers would have one believe."

== Recordings ==
"Frankie and Johnny"

Single by Brook Benton

from the album The Boll Weevil Song and 11 Other Great Hits
- B-side: "It's Just a House Without You"
- Released: August 1961
- Recorded: July 1961
- Genre: Pop, R&B
- Length: 2:27
- Label: Mercury
- Songwriters: Traditional, arranged by Brook Benton
- Producer: Shelby Singleton

Brook Benton singles chronology
"The Boll Weevil Song" (1961)	"Frankie and Johnny" (1961)	"Revenge" (1961)

"Frankie and Johnny"

Single by Sam Cooke
- B-side: "Cool Train"
- Released: July 1963
- Recorded: 1963
- Genre: R&B
- Length: 2:38
- Label: RCA Victor
- Songwriters: Traditional, arranged by Brook Benton
- Producer: Hugo & Luigi

Sam Cooke singles chronology
"Another Saturday Night" (1963)	"Frankie and Johnny" (1963)	"Little Red Rooster" (1963)

At least 256 recordings of "Frankie and Johnny" have been made since the early 20th century. The very first recording was made in London in 1912 by American singer Gene Greene. Later singers include:

- Brook Benton (number 13CAN)
- Mike Bloomfield
- Big Bill Broonzy
- Mississippi Joe Callicott
- Johnny Cash
- Sam Cooke
- Frank Crumit
- Sammy Davis Jr.
- Lonnie Donegan
- Kenny Gardner singing with Guy Lombardo's Band
- Bob Dylan
- Roscoe Holcomb
- Lena Horne
- Cisco Houston
- Mississippi John Hurt
- Burl Ives
- Jack Johnson
- Lead Belly
- Jerry Lee Lewis
- Lindsay Lohan
- Taj Mahal
- Charlie Feathers
- Van Morrison
- New Lost City Ramblers
- Charlie Patton
- Les Paul
- Hank Snow
- Charlie Poole
- Jimmie Rodgers
- Anika Noni Rose
- Pete Seeger
- Dinah Shore
- Chris Smither
- Rod Stewart
- Alice Stuart
- Dave Van Ronk
- Gene Vincent
- Fats Waller
- Doc Watson
- Mae West
- Stevie Wonder
- Josh White
- Turk Murphy

A 1966 recording by Elvis Presley became a gold record as the title song of a Presley movie. It reached number 14 in Canada.

The earliest country recording of a Frankie song is Ernest Thompson's 1924 Columbia recording of "Frankie Baker", which is listed in Tony Russell's Country Music Records A Discography, 1921–1942, Oxford University Press, 2004, ISBN 978-0195366211. Thompson was a blind street singer from Winston-Salem, North Carolina.

As a jazz standard it has also been recorded by numerous bands and instrumentalists including Louis Armstrong, Sidney Bechet, Count Basie, Bunny Berigan, Dave Brubeck, Duke Ellington, Ray Brown (musician), and Benny Goodman. Champion Jack Dupree set his version in New Orleans, retitling it "Rampart and Dumaine".

Ace Cannon recorded an instrumental version for his 1994 album Entertainer.

== Films ==
The story of Frankie and Johnny has been the inspiration for several films, including Her Man (1930, starring Helen Twelvetrees), Frankie and Johnny (1936, starring Helen Morgan), and Frankie and Johnny (1966, starring Elvis Presley). Terrence McNally's 1987 play, Frankie and Johnny in the Clair de Lune, was adapted for a 1991 film titled Frankie and Johnny starring Al Pacino and Michelle Pfeiffer.

In 1930, director and actor John Huston wrote and produced a puppet play titled Frankie and Johnnie based on the Frankie Baker case. One of Huston's main sources was his interview with Baker and Britt's neighbor Richard Clay.

Comedian Harry Langdon performed the song in his 1930 short The Fighting Parson, in a variant on his vaudeville routine originally performed in blackface. Mae West inserted her ballad into her successful Broadway play Diamond Lil. West sang the ballad again in her 1933 Paramount film She Done Him Wrong, which takes its title from the refrain, substituting genders. She also sang it many years later (1978) on the CBS television special Back Lot U.S.A. The song was used in the 1932 film Red-Headed Woman, in a scene where actress Jean Harlow's character is drinking and lamenting having been jilted by her married lover. It is also sung by a river boat crew in Bed of Roses, a film released the following year. Yvonne De Carlo sings the song while masquerading as an opera singer in the 1949 film The Gal Who Took the West. Moira Kelly sings it in the 1996 film Entertaining Angels: The Dorothy Day Story.

The 1933 pre-Code film Arizona to Broadway features drag performer Gene Malin singing this song as he portrays Ray Best, a female impersonator and Mae West type. Malin's performance is considered one of the earliest performances, if not the earliest, of a female impersonator on film.

A dazzling musical number from the 1956 MGM film Meet Me in Las Vegas featured Cyd Charisse and dancer John Brascia acting out the roles of Frankie and Johnny while Sammy Davis Jr. sang the song. Mia Farrow, in the role of Jacqueline De Bellefort, sang/hummed a drunken rendition of the song in the 1978 version of Agatha Christie's Death on the Nile, just before she attempts to shoot her former lover, Simon Doyle, played by Simon MacCorkindale.

Noah Baumbach's 1997 film Highball features a scene where this song is sung as a karaoke tune.

The climax of Robert Altman's 2006 film A Prairie Home Companion is Lindsay Lohan's rendition of the song with quasi-improvisatory lyrics by Garrison Keillor.

The tune is often used for comic effect in animated cartoon shorts, such as the 1932 Disney cartoon The Klondike Kid (starring Mickey Mouse) and various ones produced by Warner Bros. or MGM in the 1940s and 1950s, as a theme or leitmotif for a meretricious or zaftig woman. The song was the basis of a 1951 UPA cartoon Rooty Toot Toot, directed by John Hubley. It was nominated for an Academy Award for Best Short Subject. A comedic live action usage comes in the blaxploitation film Petey Wheatstraw where a woman auditions by singing the song off-key, prompting a crude reply from Petey.

The song's intro is featured in the 1929 film Weary River. It is sung by the main character Jerry Larrabee played by Richard Barthelmess. The character is a gangster reformed by music. Weary River costars Betty Compson, who played Alice Gray, the faithful sweetheart of Larrabee, who did not like him singing "Frankie and Johnny". A remarkable feature of this film is part silent film and part talkie. The film which was directed by Frank Lloyd, who was nominated for an Academy Award for Best Directing.

== Other media ==
"Frankie and Johnnie" is parodied in act two, scene five of E. E. Cummings' 1927 play Him.

In Never Kick a Woman, a Popeye the Sailor cartoon short released by Fleischer Studios on August 30, 1936, the song plays in the background when a sexy female boxer, based on film star Mae West, appears and attempts to steal Popeye away from Olive Oyl.

In Robert A. Heinlein's 1954 science fiction novel The Star Beast, Mr Kiku sings lyrics from Frankie and Johnny in three instances, the final being in the penultimate paragraph, "This story has no moral, this story has no end. This story only goes to show that there ain't no good in men."

Chicago's Redmoon Theater Company presented an adaptation of the Frankie and Johnny story at Steppenwolf Theater in 1997. The soundtrack was composed by Michael Zerang and performed by Fred Armisen, Fred Lonberg-Holm, and Jeremy Ruthrauff.

== See also ==
- List of pre-1920 jazz standards
