= The Trail of Hate (1922 film) =

1922 film

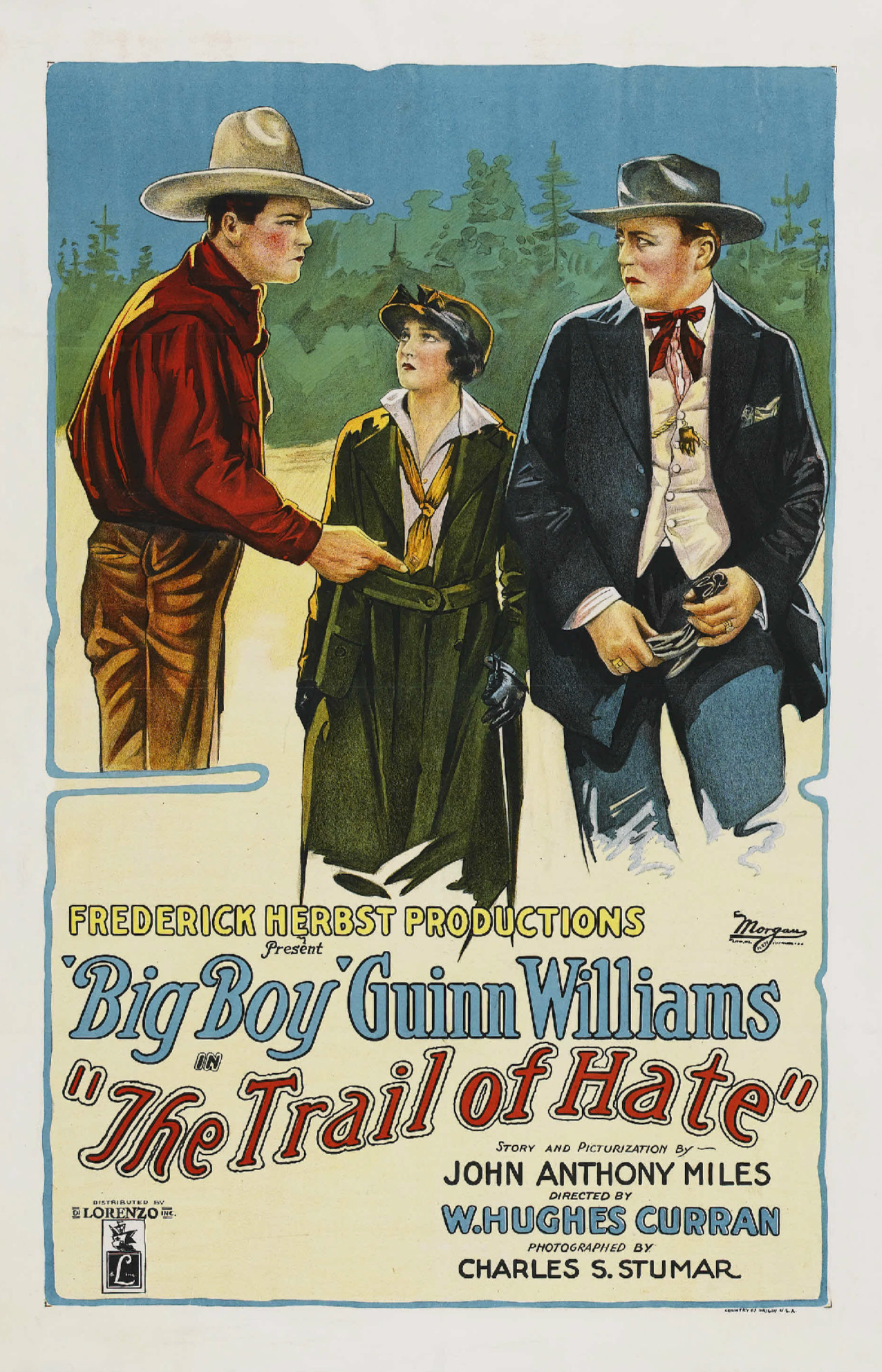
- Film poster
- Directed by: William Hughes Curran
- Written by: John Anthony Miles (story)
- Produced by: Frederick Herbst
- Starring: Guinn "Big Boy" Williams
- Cinematography: Charles J. Stumar
- Distributed by: Di Lorenzo Inc.
- Release date: October 1922
- Running time: 5 reels
- Country: United States
- Languages: Silent; English intertitles

The Trail of Hate is a lost 1922 American silent Western film directed by William Hughes Curran and starring Guinn "Big Boy" Williams.

== Plot ==
As described in a film magazine, in a prologue, Silent Kerry (Williams), in the east with a consignment of horses, is almost run down by a young woman, Mary Stockdale (Malone), whose father happens to be a resident of Kerry's town. The story begins with Kerry at his ranch forming a vigilante committee to stop the cattle rustling. The head of the rustlers is Jack Beecker (Russell), Stockdale (Harris) is his tool, and the sheriff (Hackett) is also under Beecker's power. Thus, Kerry has the whole neighborhood to fight, and he sets to it eagerly. When Mary returns to the west, Kerry elbows aside the men sent by Beecker to meet her, and this starts a row in which the entire town participates. Kerry comes off victorious, and falls in love with Mary and she with him. Then the dance hall queen Carmencita (Chadwick), in love with Kerry, complicates matters by pretending to be Kerry's cast-off wife. She is wounded in another fight attempting to save Kerry, and Kerry takes her home, an act that convinces Mary that Kerry is Carmencita's property. After a few more fights, Beecker and his two henchmen capture Mary and Kerry's sister Sunny (Tourneur). Kerry fights the three of them, with the fight ending with Beecker falling over a cliff. Carmencita has a change of heart and confesses that she is not Kerry's wife, and all ends happily.

== Cast ==
- Guinn "Big Boy" Williams as Silent Kerry
- Molly Malone as Mary Stockdale
- J. Gordon Russell as Jack Beecker
- Andrée Tourneur as 'Sunny' Kerry
- Sydney Harris as Stockdale
- Maurine Chadwick as Carmencita
- William Hackett as Sheriff (credited as William A. Hackett)
