= Frankie Baker =

American suspected murderer (1876–1952)

Frankie Baker (1876–1952) was an American woman who inspired the song "Frankie and Johnny" after she shot and killed her boyfriend Allen Britt in St. Louis, Missouri in October 1899, for which she was acquitted. The killing inspired several songs and films. Baker went on to file unsuccessful lawsuits regarding incorrect depictions of herself in film.

== Biography ==
Francine Baker was born in St. Louis, Missouri, in 1876. She was a wealthy boarding house owner and prostitute in St. Louis. She met Allen Britt, a local piano player at the Orange Blossom ball, they became lovers and Britt lived with Baker.

On October 14, 1899, at 212 Targee Street in St. Louis (at the current site of Enterprise Center hockey arena, and Josephine Baker's childhood home), Baker, then 22, laid in his bed and when he came home to find her there, he brandished a knife and attempted to attack her. She had a gun under the pillow and shot him. Some accounts say she stabbed him. He died a few days later on October 18, 1899.

Baker was detained at the Four Courts jail. The killing was judged to be a justifiable homicide.

Baker moved to Portland, Oregon, in 1915. In 1935, she sued Mae West for incidents in the film She Done Him Wrong for $100,000.

Baker died at the Eastern Oregon State Hospital in 1952.
