= Leighton Brothers =

Early-20th century vaudeville performance group

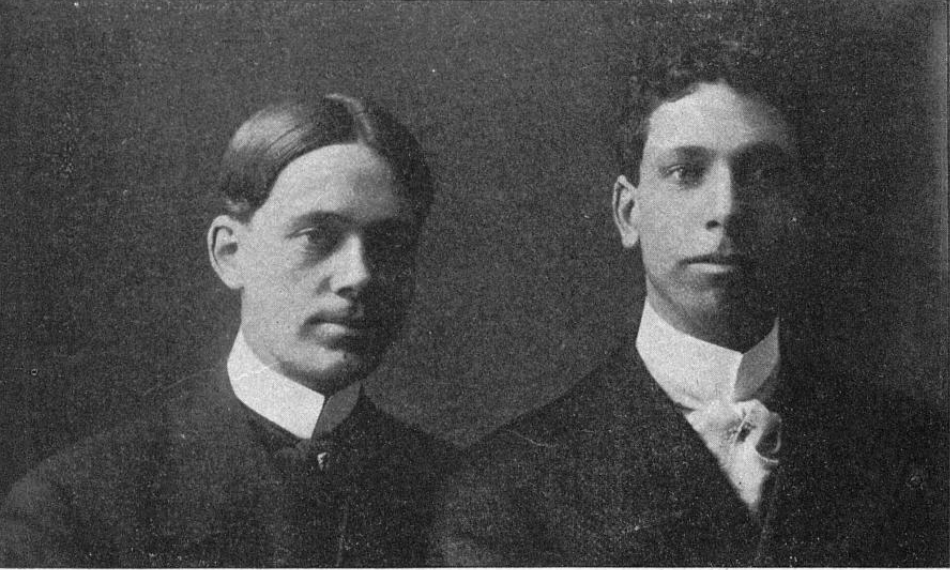

The Leighton Brothers (alt. "Leighton and Leighton") was a vaudeville performance team consisting of brothers Frank Leighton and Bert Leighton. They also composed various songs, most notably "Steamboat Bill," the tune used in the Disney animated short, Steamboat Willie.

== Biography ==
Born to Irish immigrants, the Leighton Brothers grew up in Decatur, Illinois during the latter part of the 19th century. Frank Leighton was the first of the brothers to enter show business, joining a Medicine Show in 1897 and then the Burt Sheppard Minstrel Show in 1898. Bert joined Milt G. Barlow's minstrel group in 1899. The brothers came together for the first time in 1900, joining Vogle and Deming Minstrels. The duo found success as both blackface performers and vaudeville performers for the next few years, culminating in their joining of the Lew Dockstader minstrel group in 1904. The Leighton Brothers were invited to perform on the Orpheum Circuit, highlighting their original music as well as their new compositions of popular songs. Frank Leighton died in 1927, after which Bert went into real estate. Bert died in 1964.

== Music ==
The Leighton Brothers composed many ragtime pieces for use in minstrel shows and vaudeville, including "There's A Dark Man Coming With A Bundle" (sung by Bob Roberts), "Far away in Honolulu (They've got the tango craze)" (sung by Van and Schenck), and an arrangement of "Frankie and Johnny" with Ren Shields that would set the tone for all future versions of the song

It was with Shields that the Leightons composed their most memorable and influential song, "Steamboat Bill," in 1910. The song was a parody of best-selling "The Ballad of Casey Jones," by Seibert and Newton, which had itself been based on a song from the Leightons' vaudeville routine. Steamboat Bill was recorded by Arthur Collins in 1911 and would go on to inspire Charles Reisner to write a movie for Buster Keaton titled Steamboat Bill, Jr., which released as a silent film in 1928. That same year, Walt Disney found inspiration in the movie and in the song to create the first synchronized cartoon with sound, Steamboat Willie.
