= Robert E. Lee (steamboat) =

1866 commercial steamboat

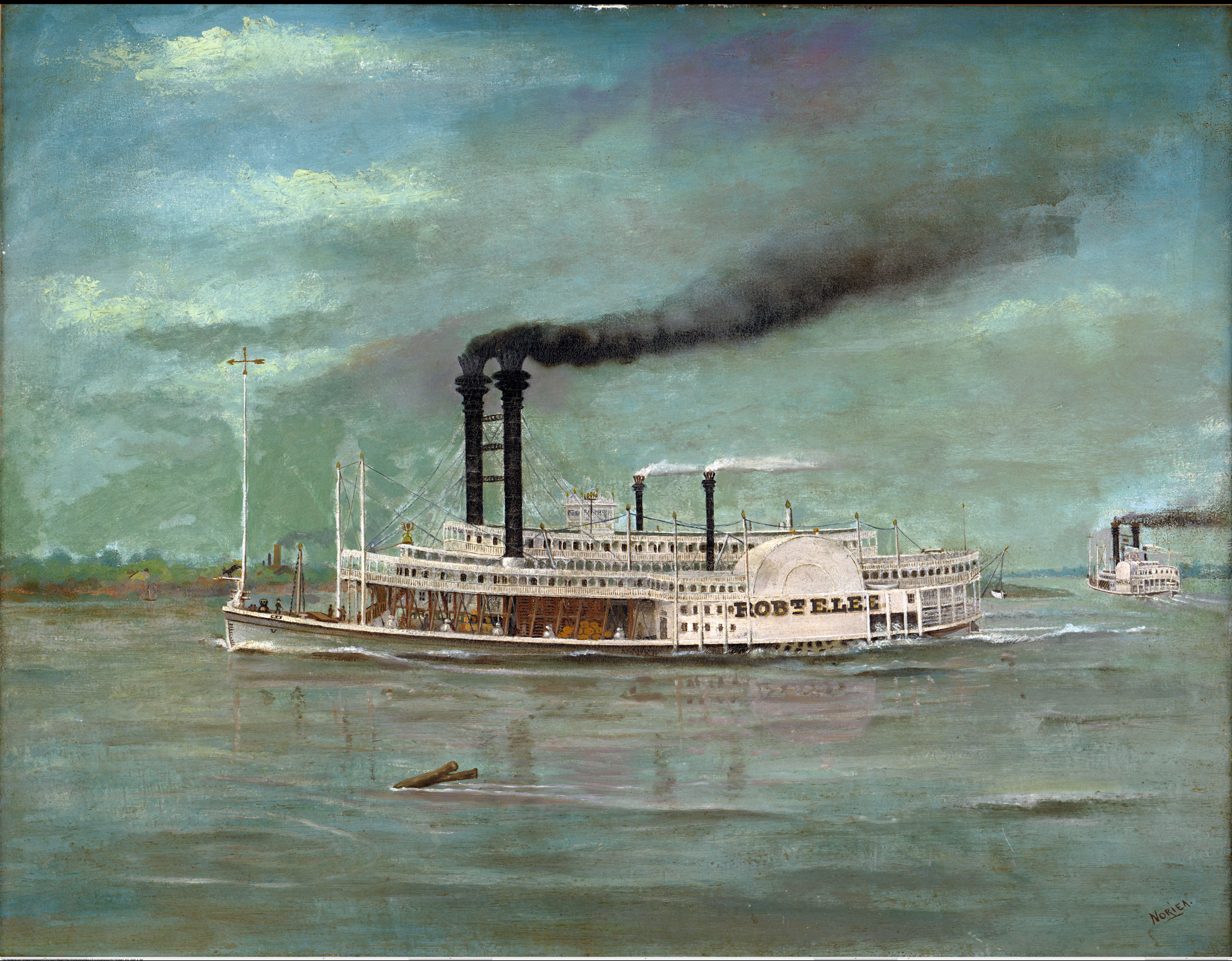
- Steamboat Robert E. Lee, by August Norieri

History
- Owner: Capt. John W. Cannon
- Route: Mississippi River
- Cost: More than $200,000
- Launched: 1866, at New Albany, Indiana
- In service: 1866
- Out of service: 1876
- Fate: Dismantled, equipments moved to the second Robert E Lee (1876–1882)

General characteristics
- Type: inland steamboat
- Tonnage: 1467
- Length: 285.5 ft (87.02 m)
- Beam: 46 ft (14.02 m)
- Depth of hold: 9.0 ft (2.74 m)
- Installed power: twin high-pressure steam engines; cylinder bores 40 inches (101.6 cm); stroke 120 inches (304.8 cm); eight iron boilers each 46 feet (14.02 m) long and 27 inches (68.6 cm) diameter, working steam pressure 120 lbs.
- Propulsion: sidewheel
- Speed: 15 Mph

Robert E. Lee, nicknamed the "Monarch of the Mississippi", was a steamboat built in New Albany, Indiana, in 1866. (Note: This steamboat is not to be confused with the second Robert E. Lee (1876–1882) or third Robert. E Lee (1897–1904).) The hull was designed by DeWitt Hill, and the riverboat cost more than $200,000 to build. She was named for Confederate General Robert E. Lee. The steamboat gained her greatest fame for racing and beating the then-current speed record holder, Natchez, in an 1870 steamboat race.

== Description ==
Robert E. Lee' had accommodations for several hundred passengers. Her cargo capacity was 5741 bales of cotton

A local newspaper in New Albany described the vessel as follows:

The cabin and outfit of this great southern steamer surpasses that of any boat that has yet graced the trade, and her accommodations are on the same scale of grandeur and magnificence. She has sixty one staterooms in the main cabin, twenty four extra rooms in the texas for passengers, a nursery for servants and children, and a cabin adjoining the nursery in which are staterooms for fifty passengers. … The main cabin carpet is a single piece 17 ½ feet wide and upwards of 225 feet (69 m) in length, a royal Winton velvet purchased of A. T. Stewart of New York and made to order. The furniture also made to order, all of modern style and costly materials in fact solid rosewood, the chairs, sofas, sociables, etc., most artistically and elaborately carved. The cushions of all seats are heavy crimson satin, and the style of the furniture is of new and original design, all made in this city at the manufactory of John Sim. She has 20 extension dining tables in the main cabin, each to accommodate twelve guests; thus seating 240 for dinner with plenty of room for extra side tables. … The machinery of the ROB'T. E. LEE consists of feet stroke, the largest high pressure engines on the river. … The doctor is considered a triumph of the medical art, it being a new style of with the parallel motion applied. It supplies the boiler with water and can throw an immense volume. The boat is also furnished with three separate pumping fire engines with an abundance of hose to use in case of fire. … She has wrought iron shafts weighing 18,750 pounds, the shafts being each 23 feet (7.0 m) in length, with the journals 18 inches (460 mm) in diameter. Each of the cranks, which are also of wrought iron, weigh 6,000 pounds. These were all made east of the Alleghenies and are the largest ever constructed for a western steamer. The texas is 140 feet (43 m) in length, with 24 passengers rooms in addition to the accommodations for officers. She also has two immense baggage rooms, all under guard. … to obviate the necessary of carrying baggage in the cabins or on guard. … The cabin with its rich garniture and splendid furniture, dazzling chandeliers, arched and fretted ceilings, etched with gold, stained glass skylights, immense mirrors, the velvet carpet, the pure zinc white of sides, the rosewood state room doors, and the imitation Egyptian marble stills, all combined to make it bear an appearance of Oriental luxury and splendor seldom conceived a never before seen floating the wild waters of this so-called semi-barbarian western world.

== Service history ==
The Robert E. Lee usually ran between New Orleans and Natchez, Mississippi. However, during spans of bad business, she would bypass Natchez in favor of St. Louis or Louisville, Kentucky.

=== Steamboat race, 1870 ===
In the summer of 1870, Robert E. Lee won a celebrated steamboat race against Natchez, going from New Orleans to St. Louis, Missouri, a distance of 1,154 miles (1,857 km), in 3 days, 18 hours and 14 minutes, several hours ahead of the Natchez. The winning ship received a silver bowl trophy inscribed with her name.

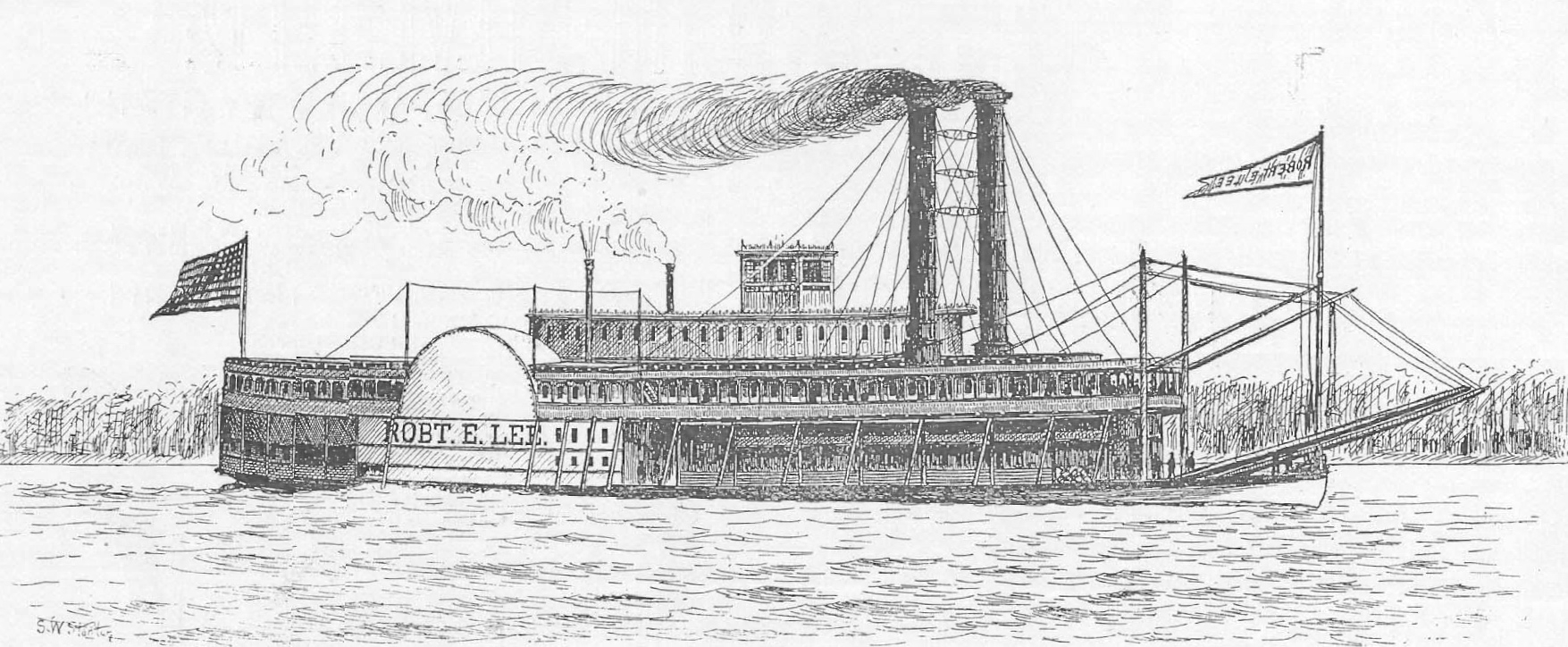
Pen-and-ink drawing of Robert E. Lee by Samuel Ward Stanton

John W. Cannon, the captain of Robert E. Lee, ensured victory by removing excess weight, carrying only a few passengers, and using prearranged barges to increase the speed of refueling. The Natchez was delayed by fog for six hours, and was weighed down by numerous passengers. Noted steamboat captain and historian Frederick Way, Jr., disputes this account, citing Johnny Farrell, second engineer of Natchez: "This old idea about the two boats preparing for days for the race, tearing down bulkheads, putting up wind sheaves, and a lot of other stuff, is not true. When I went aboard Robert E. Lee, all they had done was to move the coal bunkers a little forward... On our boat there was absolutely no preparation whatever. There was no such thing as colors flying, bands playing, and the decks of both boats crowded with ladies and gentlemen." Way also writes that at Vicksburg, both boats took fuel flats in tow and emptied them under way. Both vessels advertised before the race that they would accept freight and passengers.

It is speculated that no commercial boat has ever beaten the speed record set by Robert E. Lee during the race. In 1929, Bogie, a motor boat built by Leroy Craft, surpassed Robert E. Lee's record.

On December 22, 1870, the Robert E. Lee collided with the Potomac opposite Natchez, Mississippi. The Lee sustained much damage and was run out on a sandbar until she could be raised and repaired.

=== Dismantling, 1876 ===
Robert E. Lee left New Orleans in mid-April 1876 for dismantling in Portland, Kentucky, and several thousand came to see her off, with many salutes en route to mark the closing of her career. Her hull was taken to Memphis for use as a wharf boat. Much of her equipment and furnishings went into her successor, the second Robert E Lee (1876–1882).

The bell of the Robert E. Lee is purported to be in the collection of the Delta County Historical Society museum in Delta, Colorado.

== In popular culture ==
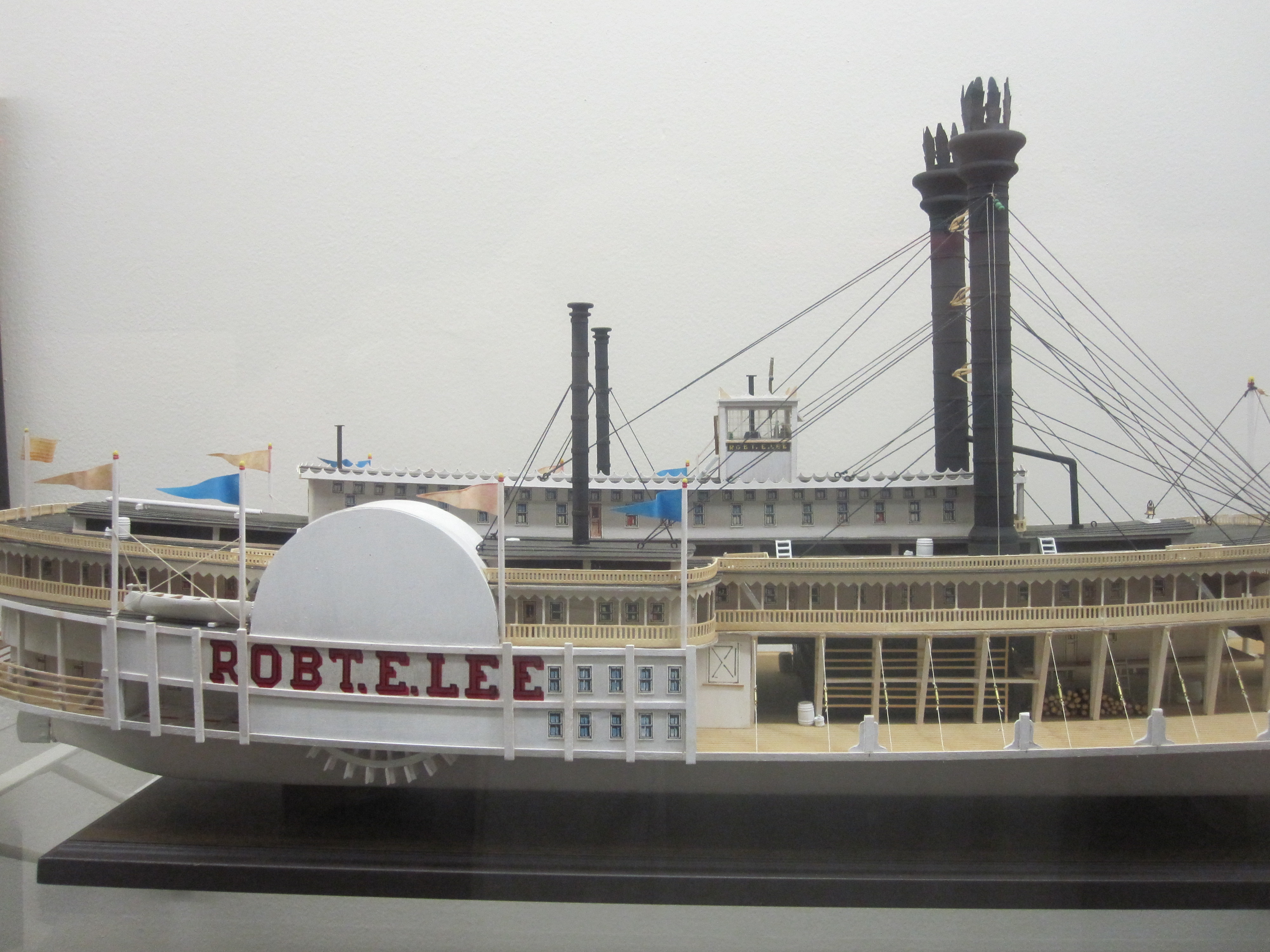
Replica of Robert E. Lee at the Louisiana State Exhibit Museum in Shreveport

- The 1910 song "Steamboat Bill" is an extended reference to the Robert E. Lee's race.
- In 1912 Lewis F. Muir and L. Wolfe Gilbert composed the song "Waiting For The Robert E. Lee", which describes the Robert E. Lee sailing to New Orleans. It was performed by Al Jolson in the 1927 film The Jazz Singer.
- The steamboat is mentioned in the song "I wanna go back to Dixie" by Tom Lehrer.
- She is mentioned in the song by The Bellamy Brothers, "You Ain't Just Whistlin' Dixie".
- The Robert E. Lee features as a map in the Wild West first-person shooter game Fistful of Frags.
- The Belgian Lucky Luke comic book by Morris and René Goscinny En remontant le Mississippi is a humorous depiction of the race between the Robert E. Lee the Natchez (renamed respectively Abestos D. Plover and Daisy Belle).
- The famous steamboat race is mentioned in George R.R. Martin's vampires-along-the-Mississippi novel Fevre Dream.
- The race is mentioned in the short story "A Bear Hunt" by William Faulkner, where one character has a shirt collar depicting the race, which is and burnt by the cigar of another character.

== See also ==
- Paddle steamer
- Steam yacht
- Steamboats of the Mississippi
