= The Bank Clerk =

1919 film

- Directed by: Fatty Arbuckle
- Written by: Fatty Arbuckle
- Starring: Fatty Arbuckle
- Release date: April 5, 1919
- Country: United States
- Languages: Silent; English intertitles

The Bank Clerk is a 1919 American short comedy film directed by and starring Fatty Arbuckle. The film is considered to be lost.

== Cast ==
- Roscoe "Fatty" Arbuckle
- Molly Malone

== See also ==
- List of American films of 1919
- Fatty Arbuckle filmography
