= The Freshie =

1922 film

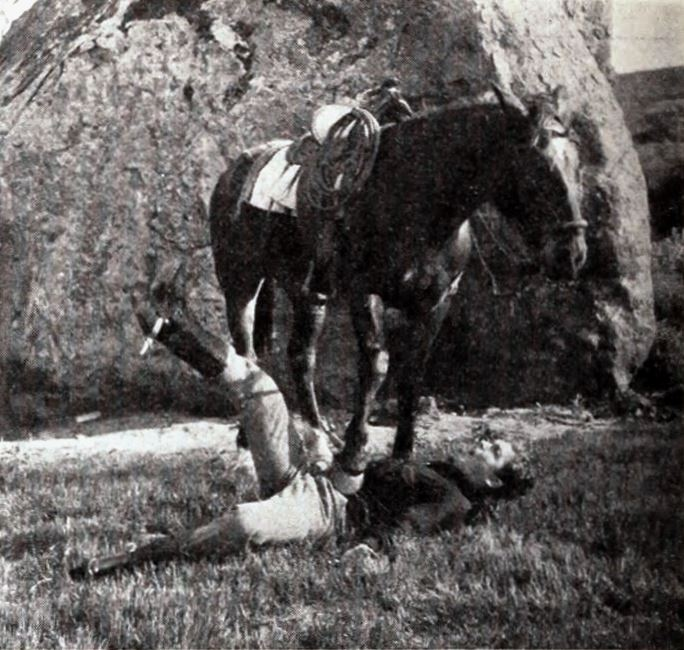
- Directed by: William Hughes Curran
- Written by: William Hughes Curran
- Produced by: Frederick Herbst
- Starring: Guinn 'Big Boy' Williams; Molly Malone; Lincoln Stedman
- Cinematography: Charles J. Stumar
- Production company: Frederick Herbst Productions
- Distributed by: Di Lorenzo Inc.
- Release date: December 19, 1922
- Running time: 50 minutes
- Country: United States
- Languages: Silent; English intertitles

The Freshie is a 1922 American silent Western comedy film directed by William Hughes Curran and starring Guinn 'Big Boy' Williams, Molly Malone and Lincoln Stedman.

== Plot ==
A vacationing professor convinces cowboy Charles Taylor that he should go to college to get an education. However he finds it takes him a while to settle down to university life.

== Cast ==
- Guinn 'Big Boy' Williams as Charles Taylor
- Molly Malone as Violet Blakely
- Lincoln Stedman as Tubby Tarpley
- James McElhern as Professor Noyes
- Edward Burns as Ranch Foreman
- Lee Phelps as Tom
- Sam Armstrong as Jack
- Buck Russell as Society Sam
- Jules Hanft as Mr. Blakely

== Bibliography ==
- Connelly, Robert B. The Silents: Silent Feature Films, 1910-36, Volume 40, Issue 2. December Press, 1998.
- Munden, Kenneth White. The American Film Institute Catalog of Motion Pictures Produced in the United States, Part 1. University of California Press, 1997.
