= Back Stage (1919 film) =

1919 film by Roscoe Arbuckle

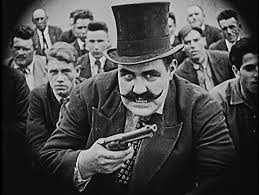
- Charles A. Post (with gun)
- Directed by: Roscoe Arbuckle
- Written by: Jean Havez
- Produced by: Joseph M. Schenck
- Starring: Roscoe Arbuckle; Buster Keaton; Al St. John
- Cinematography: Elgin Lessley
- Distributed by: Paramount Pictures
- Release date: September 7, 1919
- Running time: 26 minutes
- Country: United States
- Languages: Silent film English intertitles

Back Stage is a 1919 American two-reel silent comedy film directed by and starring Roscoe "Fatty" Arbuckle and featuring Buster Keaton and Al St. John.

In this film, Keaton, Arbuckle, Al St. John, and others work back stage as stagehands in a playhouse trying to help out and, in some cases, stay away from the eccentric performers. When the performers rebel and refuse to do the show, the stagehands, along with Arbuckle's love interest (the assistant of one of the rebelling performers) perform in their stead—including Keaton doing butterflies and no-handed cartwheels in drag.

Several Arbuckle shorts use sight gags that other comedians elaborated on in other films. In Back Stage, Arbuckle uses the falling wall sequence, where a piece of set falls on him but a window in the set piece allows him to escape being crushed. Keaton used this gag in his first short One Week (1920) and, most famously, in his 1928 film Steamboat Bill, Jr.

== Plot ==
Back Stage (1919)

Fatty, Keaton and St John play stagehands at a theater preparing the sets for the next big show. Fatty puts up a sign on the front door of the theater reading:

YOU MUST NOT MISS

GERTRUDE McSKINNY

FAMOUS STAR WHO WILL

PLAY THE LITTLE LAUNDRESS

FIRST TIME HERE

TOMORROW AT 2PM

But upon returning inside the theatre he unwittingly leaves the door open so it obscures the left side of the sign and appears to read:

MISS SKINNY WILL UNDRESS HERE AT 2PM

The evening's entertainment arrives, first an extremely flexible dancer whom Fatty and Keaton feebly attempt to mimic. Next, a tall and egotistical, strongman who badly mistreats his assistant (Malone). The staff attempt to defend the assistant but the strongman is so powerful that he is able to blow Fatty away using only his breath and does not even flinch when Keaton repeatedly hits him over the head with an axe. Eventually the staff manage to subdue the strongman by challenging him to prove his immense strength by lifting a heavy weight then electrocuting him.

That night the theater is completely full (due to the partially obscured sign) but due to his treatment earlier the strongman quits and takes the dancer with him forcing Fatty, Keaton and the assistant to plan an operetta, which they title "The Falling Reign", at short notice. Fatty and Keaton dress in drag and perform an elaborate dance act. The dancer who quit earlier is in the audience and frequently heckles the show but is soon dispatched when Keaton's dancing proves to energetic and launches him into the audience knocking the dancer out. The second act is a routine in which Fatty and Keaton are being covered with fake snow but the theater is so hot that Keaton has to fan himself and take off his coat, ruining the illusion. Things are made worse when the man slowly releasing the fake snow accidentally drops the whole bag onto Fatty, and during a scene where Fatty is serenading the assistant who sits in the window of the facade of a house, Keaton accidentally bumps into it knocking it over and causing it to fall towards Fatty but the open window fits neatly around his body saving him from harm.

Despite the show being a disaster, the audience nevertheless applaud and roar with laughter, believing the performers fumbles to be part of the act. The strongman, sitting in the audience, is outraged that his assistant is now a success. He produces a gun and shoots her before starting a brawl with the entire stage team. As Keaton and St John keep the strongman busy, Fatty loads a trunk full of weights and drops it on the strongman's head, knocking him out.

The short ends with Fatty visiting the assistant in the hospital who is recovering well.

== Cast ==
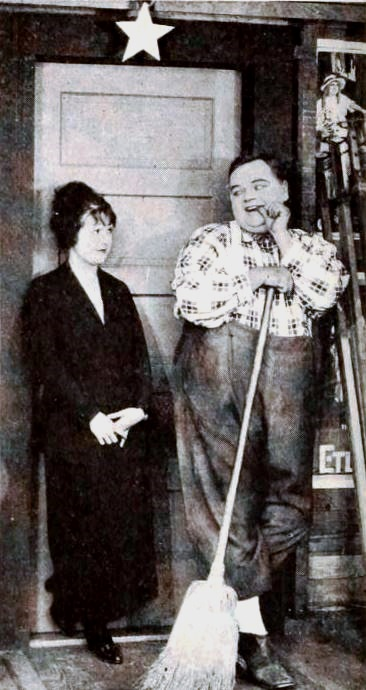
Molly Malone and Roscoe "Fatty" Arbuckle in Back Stage.

- Roscoe "Fatty" Arbuckle - Stagehand
- Buster Keaton - Stagehand
- Al St. John - Stagehand
- Charles A. Post - Strongman
- Molly Malone - Strongman's Assistant
- John Henry Coogan Jr. - Eccentric Dancer (Jackie Coogan's father, credited as John Coogan)
- Rube Miller - Stagehand

== See also ==
- List of American films of 1919
