= Molly Malone (actress) =

American actress

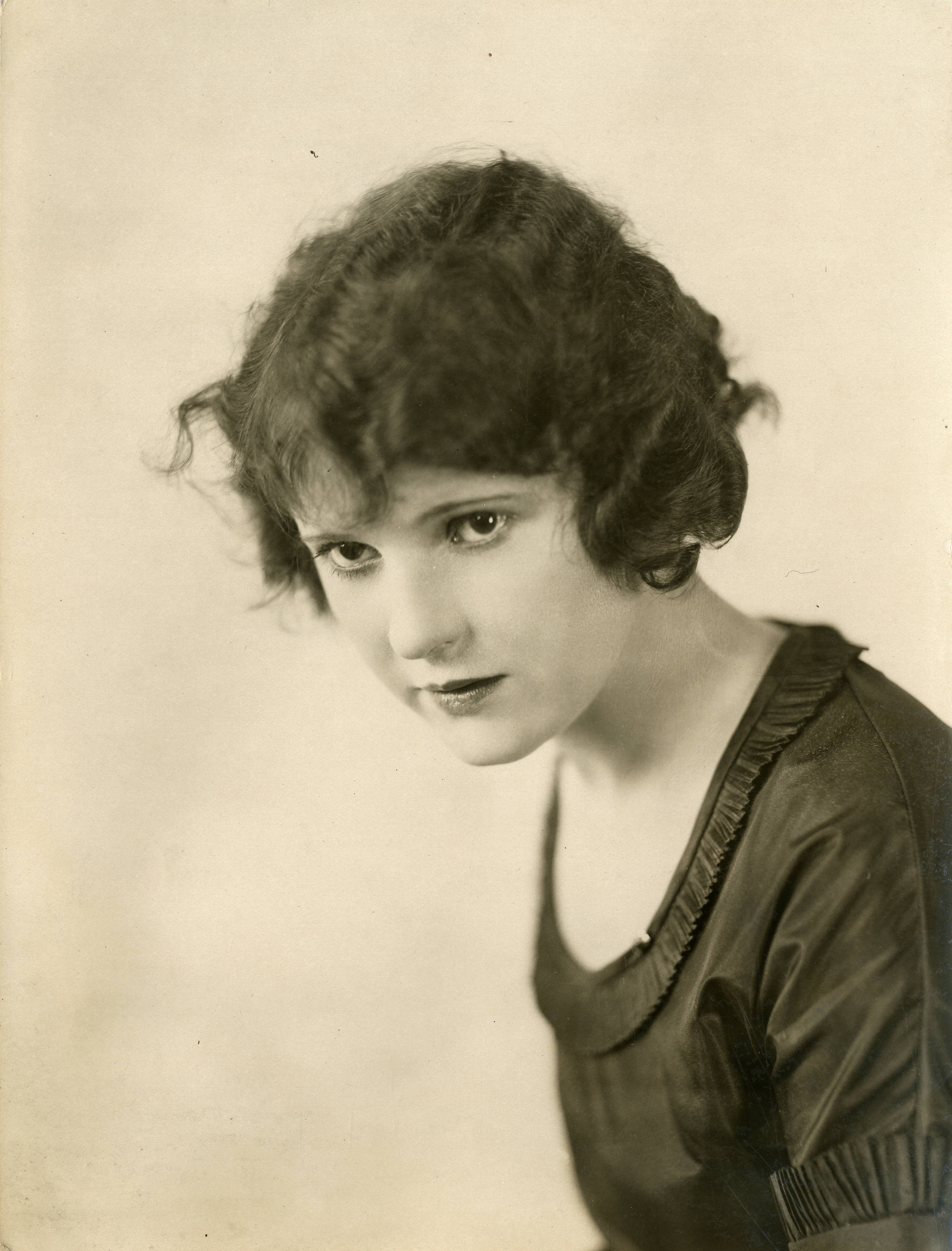
- Malone in 1921
- Born: Violet Isabel Malone; February 2, 1888
- Died: February 14, 1952 (aged 64)
- Occupation: Actress
- Years active: 1916–1929

Violet Isabel Malone (stage name Molly Malone) (February 2, 1888 – February 14, 1952) was an American actress of the silent film era. She appeared in more than 80 films between 1916 and 1929. Her father, Lewis Malone, was a metallurgist for mining companies. Her mother was Violet St. John, born in Nebraska to immigrant parents from England.

She started her movie career aged 17 and soon caught the eye of comedic actor and director Roscoe "Fatty" Arbuckle, who cast her in a number of his shorts including Back Stage and The Garage plus his feature film The Round-Up. She also appeared in films directed by John Ford and Clarence Badger. Her last film was the Universal-Stern silent comedy short The Newlyweds' Pest in 1929.

== Selected filmography ==
- Mountain Blood (1916)
- Bucking Broadway (1917)
- A Marked Man (1917)
- Straight Shooting (1917)
- The Car of Chance (1917)
- The Phantom's Secret (1917)
- The Pulse of Life (1917)
- The Soul Herder (1917)
- The Rescue (1917)
- The Lure of the Circus (1918)
- A Woman's Fool (1918)
- Hell Bent (1918)
- The Scarlet Drop (1918)
- Thieves' Gold (1918)
- Wild Women (1918)
- The Phantom Riders (1918)
- The Hayseed (1919)
- Back Stage (1919)
- A Desert Hero (1919)
- The Spite Bride (1919)
- The Bank Clerk (1919)
- Sally's Blighted Career (1919)
- The Garage (1920)
- Stop Thief! (1920)
- The Round-Up (1920)
- Bucking the Line (1921)
- Made in Heaven (1921)
- Sure Fire (1921)
- An Unwilling Hero (1921)
- Red Courage (1921)
- Not Guilty (1921)
- The Old Nest (1921) as Molly McLeod
- Blaze Away (1922)
- Across the Dead-Line (1922)
- The Freshie (1922)
- The Trail of Hate (1922)
- Little Johnny Jones (1923)
- Westbound (1924)
- Battling Bunyan (1924)
- The Knockout Kid (1925)
- The Man from Oklahoma (1926)
- The Bandit Buster (1926)
- Rawhide (1926)
- Bad Man's Bluff (1926)
- The Golden Stallion (1927)
- Daring Deeds (1927)
- His Angel Child (1929)
