= Made in Heaven (1921 film) =

1921 film by Victor Schertzinger

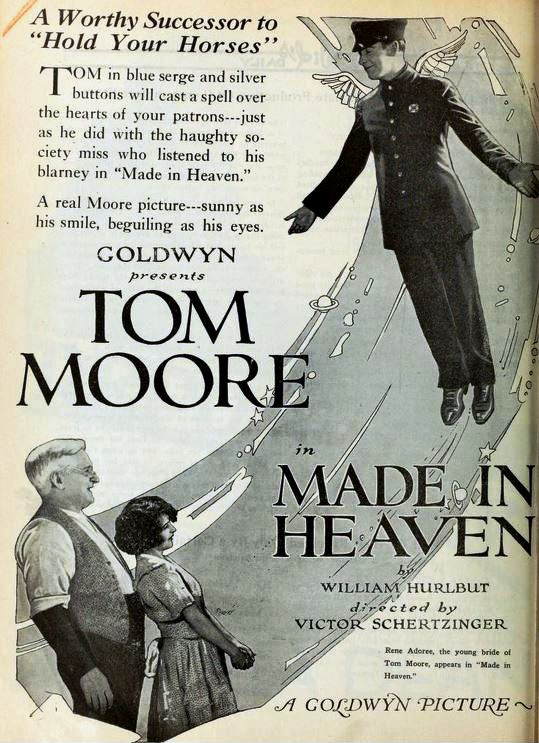
- Directed by: Victor Schertzinger
- Written by: William Hurlbut (story); Arthur F. Statter
- Starring: Tom Moore; Helene Chadwick; Molly Malone
- Cinematography: Ernest Miller
- Distributed by: Goldwyn Pictures
- Release date: May 1921 (United States)
- Country: United States
- Language: Silent (English intertitles)

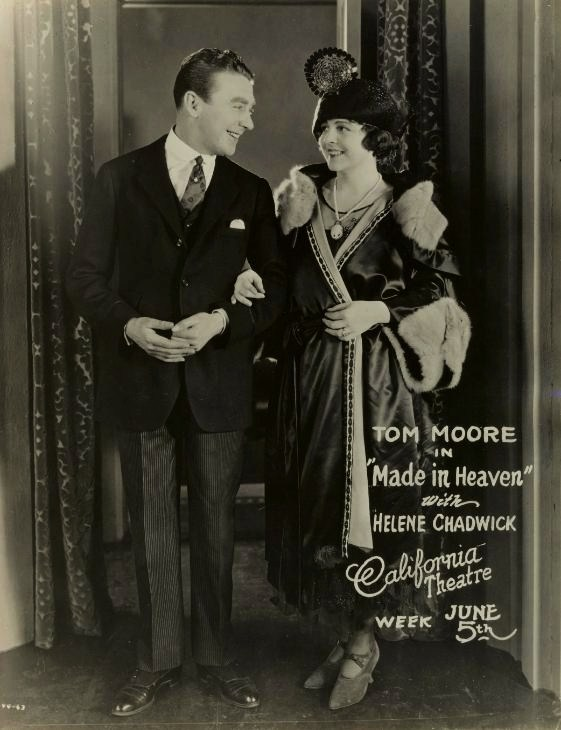
Tom Moore and Helene Chadwick

Made in Heaven is a lost 1921 American silent comedy film directed by Victor Schertzinger and starring Tom Moore, Helene Chadwick and Molly Malone.

== Plot ==
William Lowry, an Irish immigrant, rescues Claudia Royce from a burning building, and upon hearing that her parents are trying to force her to accept millionaire Leland, whom she does not love, he proposes a marriage of convenience to himself. She accepts, and Bill arranges a fake ceremony; but when she falls in love with Davidge, Bill refuses her a "divorce." Later, Bill gets rich in the manufacture of a patented fireman's pole, and when he buys a house for Claudia she realizes her love for him and they are legally married.

== Cast ==
- Tom Moore as William Lowry
- Helene Chadwick as Claudia Royce
- Molly Malone as Elizabeth Royce
- Kate Lester as Mrs. Royce
- Al W. Filson as Mr. Royce
- Freeman Wood as Davidge
- Charles Eldridge as Lowry Sr.
- Renée Adorée as Miss Lowry
- Herbert Prior as Leland
- Fronzie Gunn as Ethel Hadden
- John Cossar as Mr. Hadden

== Preservation ==
With no holdings located in archives, Made in Heaven is considered a lost film.

== See also ==
- List of lost films
