= A Desert Hero =

1919 film directed by Fatty Arbuckle

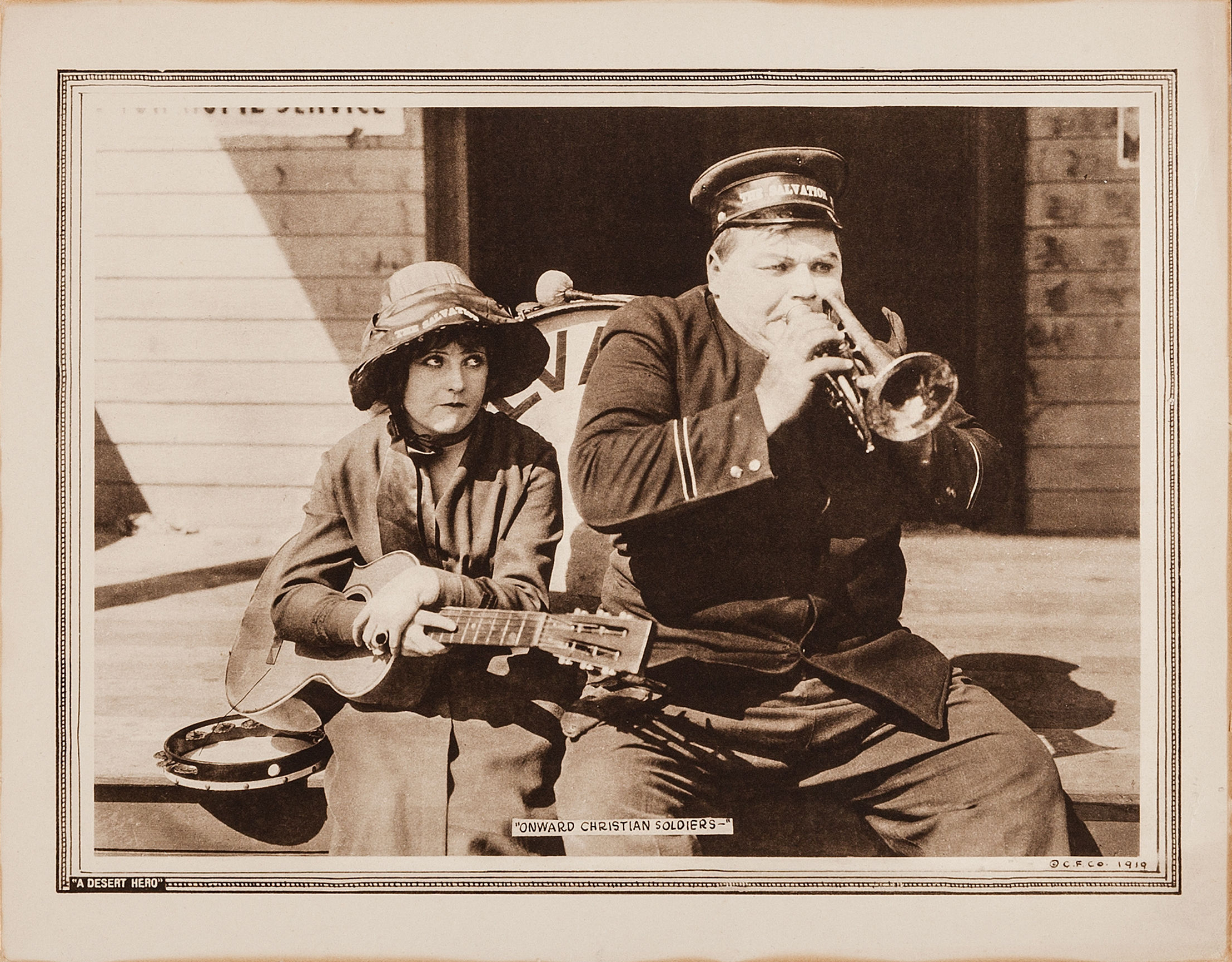
- Lobby card
- Directed by: Roscoe Arbuckle
- Written by: Fatty Arbuckle
- Starring: Fatty Arbuckle
- Production company: Comique Film Company
- Distributed by: Paramount Pictures
- Release date: June 15, 1919
- Country: United States
- Language: Silent (English intertitles)

A Desert Hero is a 1919 American short comedy film directed by and starring Fatty Arbuckle. The film is considered to be lost.

== Plot ==
Arbuckle plays a miner who has struck gold. He comes into a frontier town called Carbolic Camp looking for a good time. The town is wild and woolly; anybody who takes the job of sheriff is killed within minutes. Looking to change his gold into cash, Arbuckle enters Hyena Hall, a dancehall run by an enormous bully named Bullneck Bradley. The locals scheme to steal his gold. The star dancing girl refuses to be part of the scheme and is thrown out into the street.

Arbuckle gets into a fight with the town bully; when he wins, he is elected sheriff. He falls in love with the dancing girl, who reforms and joins the Salvation Army. While the Salvation Army is holding a meeting in front of the dancehall, Arbuckle overhears the dancehall owner making disparaging remarks. They fight; Arbuckle wins and makes everyone present join the Salvation Army.

== Cast ==
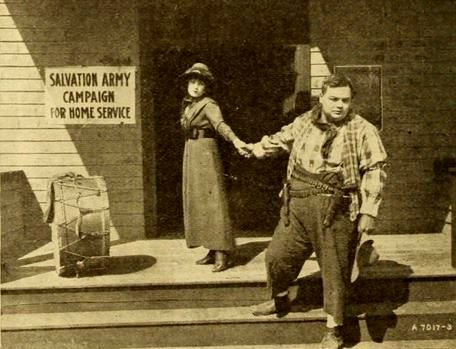
Molly Malone and Fatty Arbuckle

- Roscoe "Fatty" Arbuckle as The Sheriff, the Desert Hero
- Al St. John as The Bad Man
- Molly Malone as The Young Girl
- Monte Collins as The Old Man
- John Henry Coogan Jr. (credited as John Coogan)
- Alice Lake

== See also ==
- List of American films of 1919
- Fatty Arbuckle filmography
