= Guinn "Big Boy" Williams =

American actor (1899–1962)

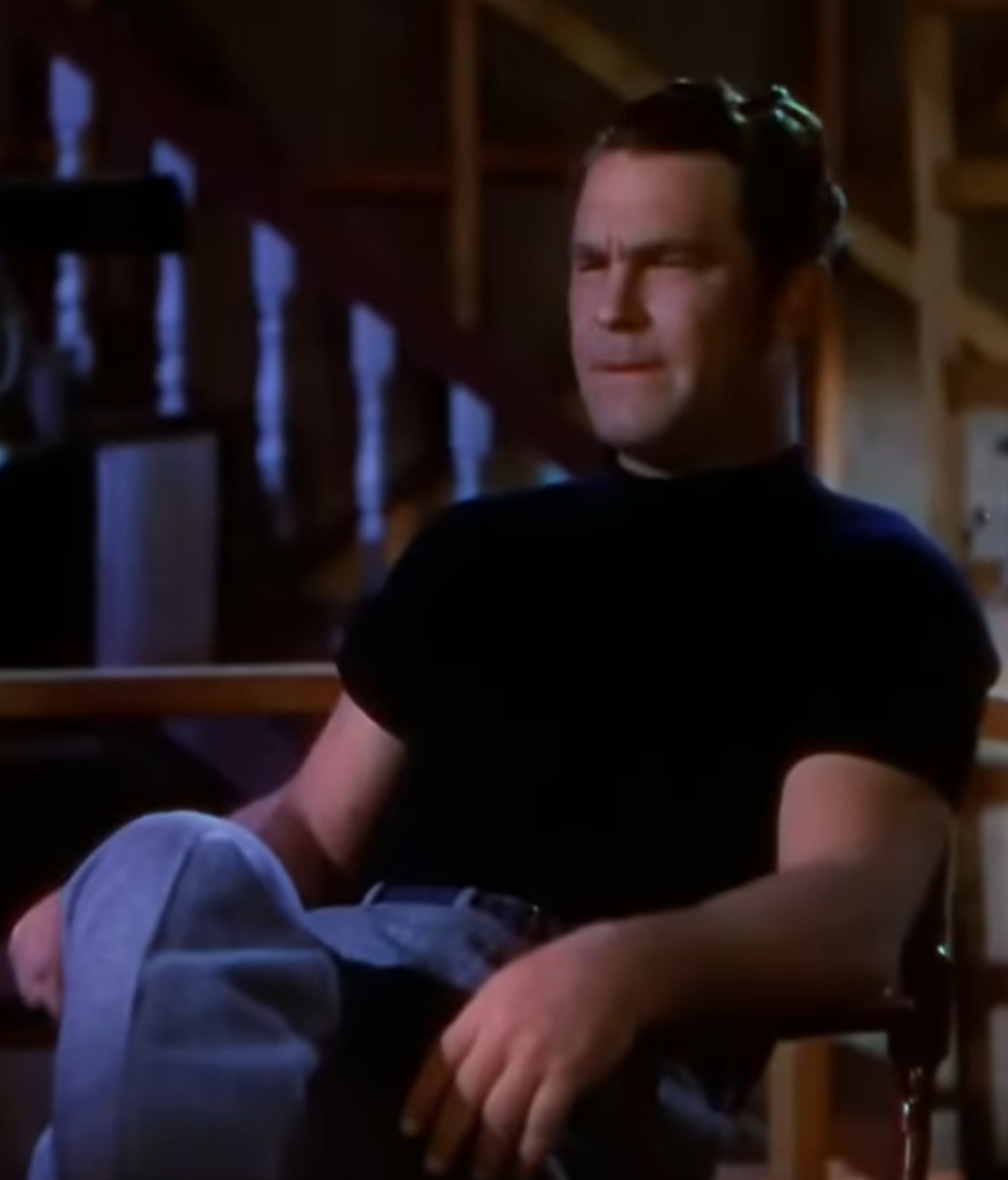
- Williams in A Star Is Born (1937)
- Born: Guinn Terrell Williams Jr. April 26, 1899; Decatur, Texas, U.S.
- Died: June 6, 1962 (aged 63); Hollywood, California, U.S.
- Resting place: Forest Lawn Memorial Park, Hollywood Hills
- Other name: Big Boy
- Occupation: Actor
- Years active: 1919–1961
- Height: 6 ft 2 in (188 cm)
- Spouse(s): Barbara Weeks (m. 19??; div. 19??); Kathleen Collins (m. 19??; div. 19??) Dorothy Peterson (m. 1943)
- Father: Guinn Williams

Guinn Terrell Williams Jr. (April 26, 1899 – June 6, 1962) was an American actor who appeared in memorable Westerns such as Dodge City (1939), Santa Fe Trail (1940), and The Comancheros (1961). He was nicknamed "Big Boy" because he was 6' 2" and had a muscular build from years of working on ranches and playing semiprofessional and professional baseball. At the height of his movie career, he was frequently billed above the title simply as "Big Boy" Williams, or as Guinn "Big Boy" Williams or "Big Boy" Guinn Williams on posters and in the film itself.

== Biography ==
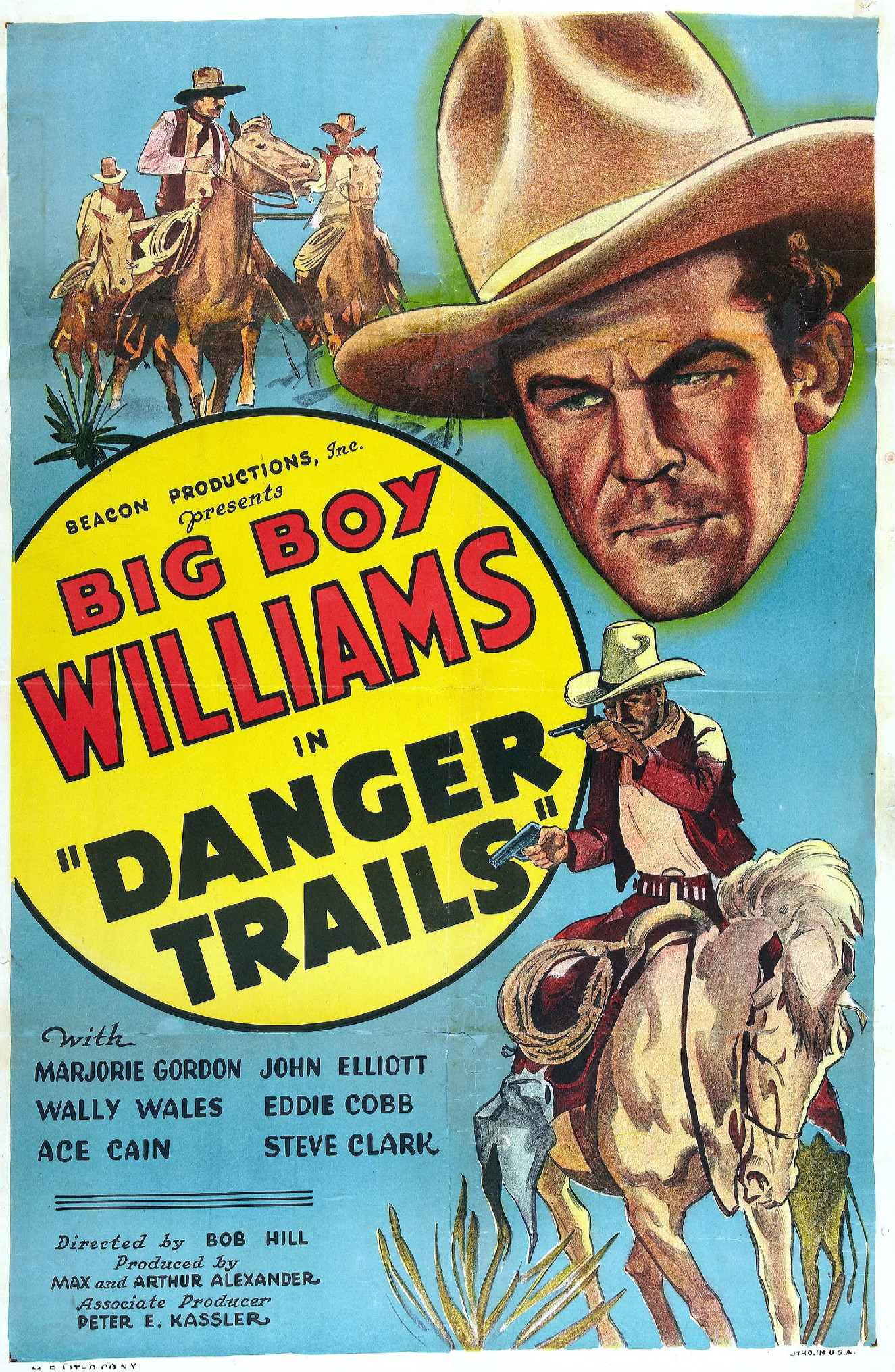
Danger Trails (1935)

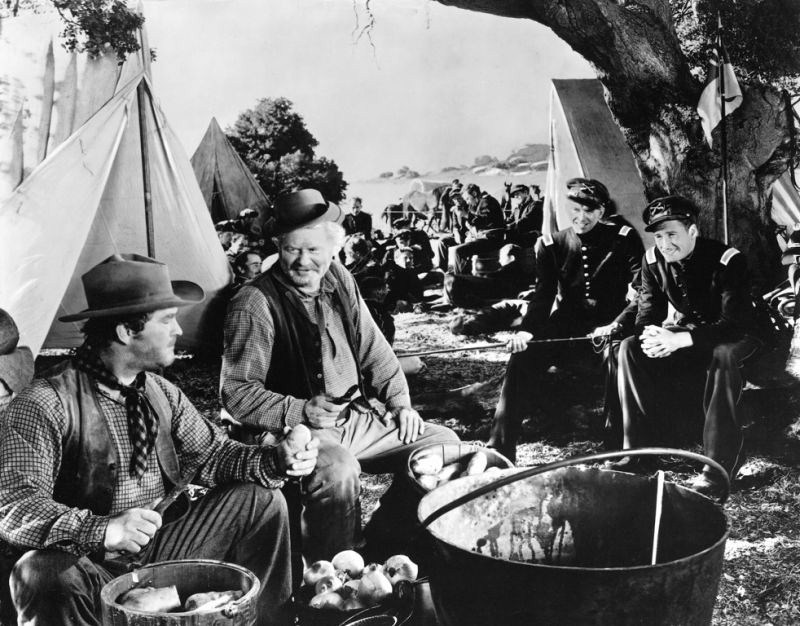
Santa Fe Trail – L to R: Guinn "Big Boy" Williams, Alan Hale Sr., Ronald Reagan, and Errol Flynn (1940)

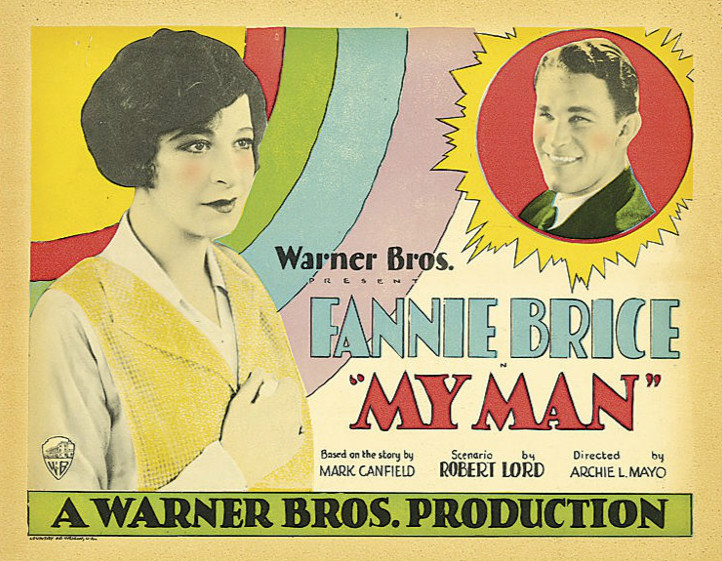
Lobby card with Fannie Brice and Guinn "Big Boy" Williams (1928)

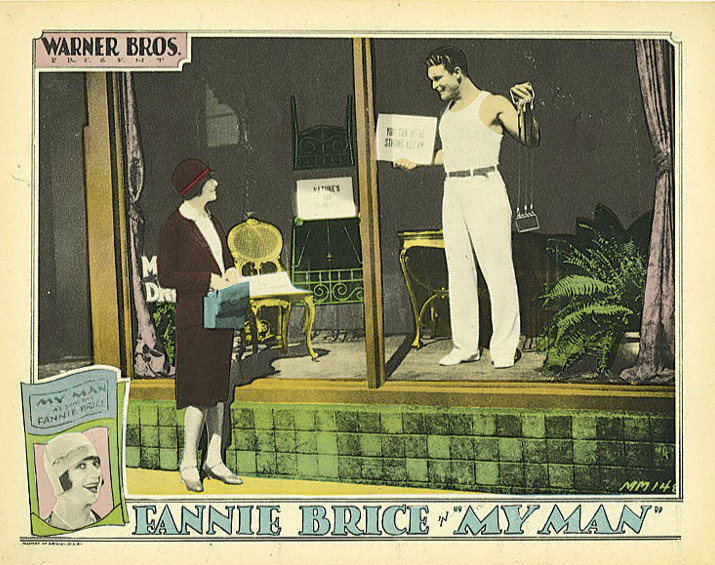
Lobby card with Fannie Brice and Guinn "Big Boy" Williams (1928)

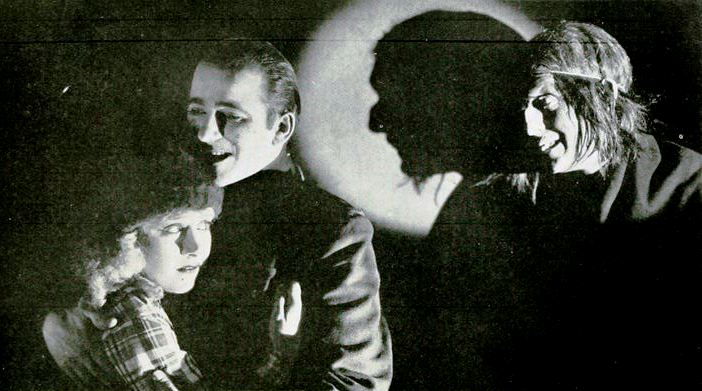
Williams and Marion Aye in 1921's The Vengeance Trail

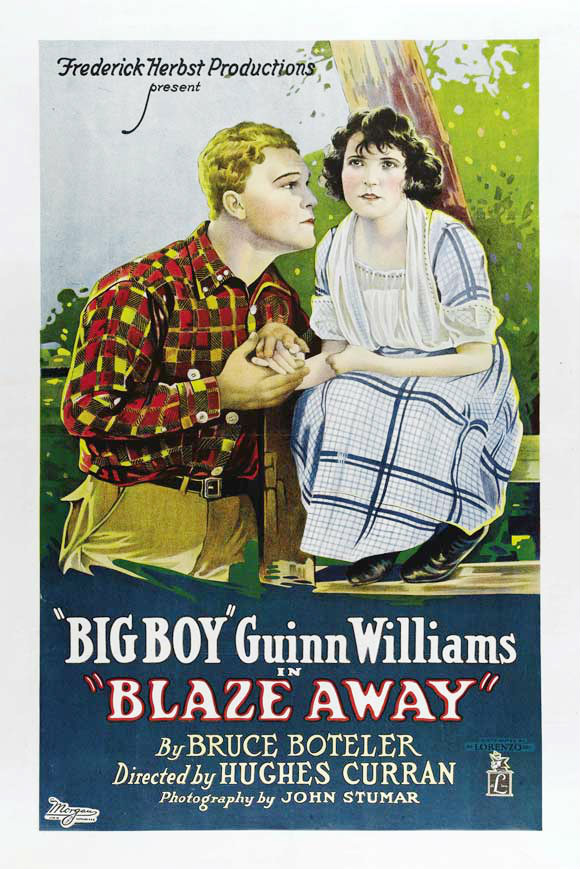
Blaze Away (1922)

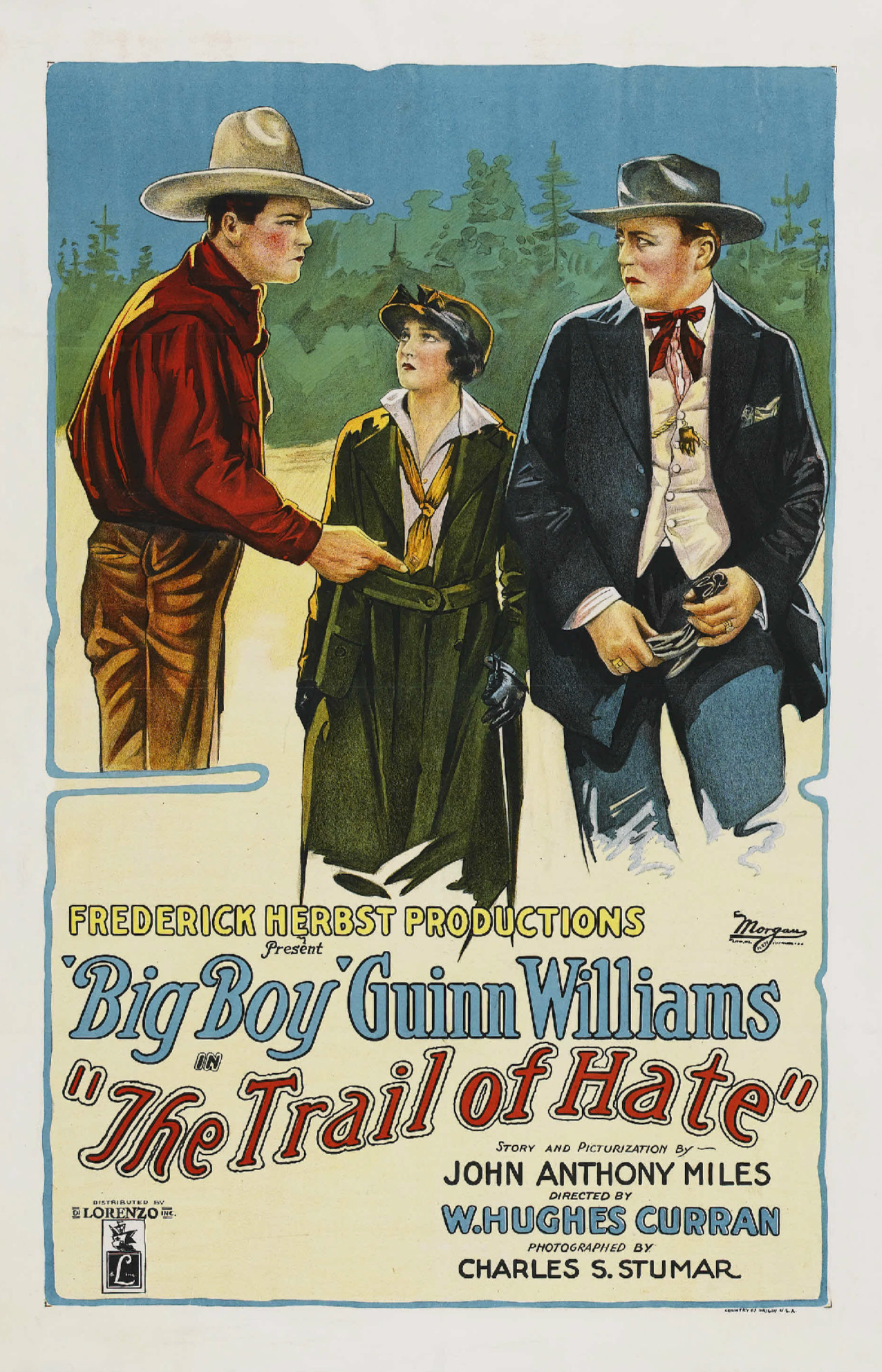
The Trail of Hate (1922)

His father, Guinn Williams (1871–1948), a Democratic congressman, represented the 13th Texas Congressional District in the United States House of Representatives from 1922 to 1932. When Williams Jr. returned from World War I as an Army officer, he found out his father had secured for him an appointment to West Point that Williams Jr. saw no need to attend after his war service; he decided to become a baseball player, instead. He was introduced by Will Rogers into motion pictures and polo, where he became a champion player and was given the name "Big Boy" by Rogers.

Williams made his screen debut in the 1919 comedy, Almost a Husband, with Will Rogers and Cullen Landis, was the titular leading man to singing comedienne Fannie Brice in My Man (1928), and was featured in a large supporting role in Frank Borzage's Lucky Star (1929) with Janet Gaynor and Charles Farrell. Throughout the 1920s, Williams had a string of successful films, mostly Westerns in which he wore a ten-gallon hat.

He then appeared in The Great Meadow alongside Johnny Mack Brown, which was Brown's breakout film. Throughout the 1930s, Williams acted in supporting roles, mostly in Westerns, sports, or outdoor dramas. He was always employed, and was successful as both a B-picture leading man and a supporting actor in A pictures. He often played alongside Hoot Gibson and Harry Carey during that period. In 1944, he was cast in a large role as sidekick to Robert Mitchum in Mitchum's first leading role (billed as "Introducing Bob Mitchum") in Zane Grey's Nevada, a remake of a 1927 film starring Gary Cooper. In 1941, he became one of many actors cast by Universal Pictures in their large film serial, Riders of Death Valley. From the late 1930s to the mid-1940s, Williams appeared in supporting roles in a number of A pictures, sometimes with high billing, such as You Only Live Once, and in Columbia's first Technicolor film, The Desperadoes (1943).

Williams was frequently teamed with Alan Hale as sidekicks to Errol Flynn in several of his pictures. In 1960, he was cast in the epic film The Alamo and in Home from the Hill with Robert Mitchum. His last role was opposite his close friend John Wayne and Stuart Whitman in The Comancheros.

On television, he appeared in the Western series Gunsmoke as Groat, a gruff, bully cowboy in the 1957 episode "Skid Row" (S2E22).

== Personal life ==
In the 1920s, he had an affair with Mary Philbin while she was engaged to Paul Kohner.

He was married to three actresses, the first being silent film actress Kathleen Collins. For a time, he was married to B-movie actress Barbara Weeks. His last wife was Dorothy Peterson, whom he first met in the 1940s. Prior to meeting her, he had been engaged to Lupe Vélez, but she broke off the engagement at their friend Errol Flynn's home by breaking a framed portrait of Williams over his head and then urinating on the picture.

Like his father, Williams was active in an array of notable and state-related causes. He worked with the regional Agricultural Credit Association, the Production Credit Corporation, the Goat Raisers Association, the Texas Wool and Mohair Company, and the Bankers Association (all of which coincided both in his native Texas and adopted California).

Williams died unexpectedly of uremic poisoning on June 6, 1962, aged 63. Williams was interred in the Enduring Faith section at Forest Lawn Memorial Park, Hollywood Hills of Los Angeles.

== Filmography ==
- Almost a Husband (1919)
- Jubilo (1919) – Man Shooting Pool with Bert
- Cupid the Cowpuncher (1920) – Hairoil Johnson
- Godless Men (1920) – Seaman
- The Vengeance Trail (1921) – Big Boy Bronson
- Western Firebrands (1921) – Billy Fargo
- Across the Border (1922) – Andy Fowler
- Rounding Up the Law (1922) – Larry Connell
- The Cowboy King (1922) – Dud Smiley
- Remembrance (1922)
- The Trail of Hate (1922) – Silent Kerry
- Blaze Away (1922) – Big Boy
- The Freshie (1922) – Charles Taylor
- Cyclone Jones (1923) – Cyclone Jones
- Riders at Night (1923)
- End of the Rope (1923)
- $1,000 Reward (1923)
- The Avenger (1924) – Nat Sherwood
- The Eagle's Claw (1924) – Dan Carson
- Red Blood and Blue (1925) – Tom Butler
- Fangs of Wolfheart (1925)
- Wolfheart's Revenge (1925) – Jack Stanley
- Sporting West (1925)
- Black Cyclone (1925) – Jim Lawson
- Whistling Jim (1925) – Whistling Jim
- Rose of the Desert (1925)
- Riders of the Sand Storm (1925) – The Cowboy
- Courage of Wolfheart (1925)
- The Big Stunt (1925)
- Brown of Harvard (1926) – Hal Walters
- The Desert's Toll (1926)
- Quarantined Rivals (1927) – Joe, the plumber
- Slide, Kelly, Slide (1927) – McLean
- Backstage (1927) – Mike Donovan
- Arizona Bound (1927) – Cowboy
- Snowbound (1927) – Bull Morgan
- Babe Comes Home (1927) – Baseball Player
- The Woman Who Did Not Care (1927) – Lars
- Lightning (1927) – Cuth Stewart
- The Down Grade (1927) – Ed Holden
- The College Widow (1927) – Don White
- Burning Daylight (1928) – English Harry
- Ladies' Night in a Turkish Bath (1928) – Sweeney
- Vamping Venus (1928) – Mars
- Beggars of Life (1928) – Baker's Cart Driver
- Noah's Ark (1928) – Al / Ham
- My Man (1928) – Joe Halsey
- From Headquarters (1929) – Gunnery Sgt. Wilmer
- Lucky Star (1929) – Sgt. Martin Wrenn
- The Forward Pass (1929) – Honey Smith
- City Girl (1930) – Reaper
- The Big Fight (1930) – Tiger
- The Bad Man (1930) – Red Giddings
- Liliom (1930) – Hollinger
- College Lovers (1930) – Tiny Courtley
- The Bachelor Father (1931) – Richard 'Dick' Berney
- The Great Meadow (1931) – Rubin Hall
- The Phantom (1931) – Dick Mallory
- Ladies of the Jury (1932) – Steve Bromm
- Polly of the Circus (1932) – Eric
- Drifting Souls (1932) – Bing
- 70,000 Witnesses (1932) – Connors
- Heritage of the Desert (1932) – Lefty – Henchman
- You Said a Mouthful (1932) – Joe Holt, a Swimming Champion
- The Devil Is Driving (1932) – Mac
- The Phantom Broadcast (1933) – Sandy Higgins
- Laughing at Life (1933) – Jones
- Man of the Forest (1933) – Big Boy
- Rafter Romance (1933) – Fritzie
- College Coach (1933) – Matthews
- The Mystery Squadron (1933, Serial) – Bill 'Jellybean' Cook
- Palooka (1934) – Slats
- Cheaters (1934) – Detective Sweeney
- Half a Sinner (1934) – 'Bull' Moran
- Here Comes the Navy (1934) – Dance-Floor Manager
- Romance in the Rain (1934) – Panya Mankiewicz
- Thunder Over Texas (1934) – Ted Wright
- Flirtation Walk (1934) – 'Sleepy'
- Cowboy Holiday (1934) – Buck Sawyer
- The Silver Streak (1934) – Higgins
- Big Boy Rides Again (1935) – Tom Duncan
- Private Worlds (1935) – Jerry
- One in a Million (1935) – Spike McGafferty
- Village Tale (1935) – Ben Roberts
- The Glass Key (1935) – Jeff
- Society Fever (1935) – Edgar Prouty
- Danger Trails (1935) – Bob Wilson
- Here Comes Cookie (1935) – Big Boy
- Powdersmoke Range (1935) – Lullaby Joslin
- Gun Play (1935) – Bill Williams
- The Law of 45's (1935) – Tucson Smith
- Miss Pacific Fleet (1935) – Nicholas 'Nick', Annie's Boyfriend
- The Littlest Rebel (1935) – Sgt. Dudley
- Muss 'em Up (1936) – 'Red' Cable
- Kelly the Second (1936) – Cecil Callahan
- Grand Jury (1936) – Joseph Britt
- The Vigilantes Are Coming (1936, Serial) – Salvation
- The Big Game (1936) – Pete Jenkins
- End of the Trail (1936) – Bob Hildreth
- North of Nome (1936) – Haage
- Career Woman (1936) – Bede Sanders
- You Only Live Once (1937) – Roger
- Don't Tell the Wife (1937) – Lazarus Hubert Gregory 'Cupid' Dougal
- A Star Is Born (1937) – Posture Coach
- Dangerous Holiday (1937) – Duke Edwards
- Girls Can Play (1937) – Lieutenant Flannigan
- Flying Fists (1937) – Slug Cassidy
- The Singing Marine (1937) – Dopey
- She's No Lady (1937) – Jeff
- Big City (1937) – Danny Devlin
- My Dear Miss Aldrich (1937) – An Attendant
- Wise Girl (1937) – Mike
- The Bad Man of Brimstone (1937) – 'Vulch' McCreedy
- Everybody's Doing It (1938) – 'Softy' Blane
- You and Me (1938) – Taxi
- The Marines Are Here (1938) – Sgt. Gibbons
- Crashing Through Danger (1938) – Slim
- Professor Beware (1938) – Motorcycle Cop
- Army Girl (1938) – Sgt. Harry Ross
- Hold That Co-ed (1938) – Mike
- Down in 'Arkansaw' (1938) – Juble Butler
- I Demand Payment (1938) – Happy Crofton
- Pardon Our Nerve (1939) – Samson Smith
- Dodge City (1939) – Tex Baird
- Street of Missing Men (1939) – T-Bone
- 6,000 Enemies (1939) – Maxie
- Mutiny on the Blackhawk (1939) – Blake – the First Mate
- Bad Lands (1939) – Billy Sweet
- Fugitive at Large (1939) – Conway
- Blackmail (1939) – Moose McCarthy
- Legion of Lost Flyers (1939) – Jake Halley
- The Fighting 69th (1940) – Paddy Dolan
- Castle on the Hudson (1940) – Mike Cagle
- Virginia City (1940) – 'Marblehead'
- Alias the Deacon (1940) – Bull Gumbatz
- Wagons Westward (1940) – Jake Hardman
- Money and the Woman (1940) – Mr. Adler, the Bank Guard
- Dulcy (1940) – Henry
- Santa Fe Trail (1940) – Windy Brody
- Six Lessons from Madame La Zonga (1941) – Alvin
- Country Fair (1941) – Gunther Potts
- Billy the Kid (1941) – Ed Bronson
- Riders of Death Valley (1941, Serial) – Borax Bill
- You'll Never Get Rich (1941) – Kewpie Blain
- Swamp Water (1941) – Bud Dorson
- Mr. Bug Goes to Town (1941) – Narrator
- The Bugle Sounds (1942) – Sgt. Krims
- Mr. Wise Guy (1942) – Luke Manning
- Lure of the Islands (1942) – Jinx
- Between Us Girls (1942) – Father of the Boys
- Silver Queen (1942) – Blackie
- American Empire (1942) – Sailaway
- The Desperadoes (1943) – Nitro Rankin
- Minesweeper (1943) – CPO Ichabod Ferdinand 'Fixit' Smith
- Hands Across the Border (1944) – Teddy Bear
- Cowboy Canteen (1944) – Spud Harrigan
- Cowboy and the Senorita (1944) – Teddy Bear
- Nevada (1944) – Dusty
- Belle of the Yukon (1944) – Sheriff Mervin Maitland
- Sing Me a Song of Texas (1945) – Big Boy
- The Man Who Walked Alone (1945) – Champ
- Rhythm Round-Up (1945) – Zeke Winslow
- Song of the Prairie (1945) – Big Boy Jackson
- Throw a Saddle on a Star (1946) – Big Boy
- That Texas Jamboree (1946) – Big Boy Frazer
- Cowboy Blues (1946) – Big Boy
- Singing on the Trail (1946) – Big Boy Webster
- Singin' in the Corn (1946) – Hank
- Over the Santa Fe Trail (1947) – Big Boy Jackson
- King of the Wild Horses (1947) – Jed Acker
- Smoky River Serenade (1947) – Wagon Wheel
- Road to the Big House (1947) – Butch McQuinn
- Station West (1948) – Mick
- Smoky Mountain Melody (1948) – Saddle Grease Williams
- Bad Men of Tombstone (1949) – Red Fisk
- Brimstone (1949) – Deputy Art Benson
- Hoedown (1950) – Small Potatoes
- Rocky Mountain (1950) – Pap Dennison
- Al Jennings of Oklahoma (1951) – Lon Tuttle
- Man in the Saddle (1951) – Bourke Prine
- Springfield Rifle (1952) – Sgt. Snow
- Hangman's Knot (1952) – Smitty
- Southwest Passage (1954) – Tall Tale
- Massacre Canyon (1954) – Private Peaceful Allen
- The Outlaw's Daughter (1954) – Moose, Deputy
- Hidden Guns (1956) – Kingford
- Man from Del Rio (1956) – Fred Jasper
- The Hired Gun (1957) – Elby Kirby
- The Restless Gun (1959) - Episode "A Trial for Jenny May"
- Home from the Hill (1960) – Hugh Macauley
- Five Bold Women (1960) – Big Foot
- The Alamo (1960) – Lt. 'Irish' Finn
- The Comancheros (1961) – Ed McBain – Gunrunner

=== Television ===
- My Friend Flicka (1955–1956) – Jeb Taylor
- Circus Boy (1956–1957) – Pete, the Canvasman
- Gunsmoke (1957) – Groat
- Cheyenne (1957) – Prairie Dog
- Sugarfoot (1958) – Moose McKlintock
- The Adventures of Rin Tin Tin (1958) – Sgt. Muldoon
- Tales of Wells Fargo (1958) – Mike Forbes
- Wagon Train (1959) – Calvin Bryngelson
- The Restless Gun (1959) – Jeff Bonsell
- The Magical World of Disney (1960) – Buffalo
