= William Hughes Curran =

American film director

- Born: June 18, 1893; New York, United States
- Died: January 6, 1940 (aged 46); Los Angeles, California, United States
- Occupation: Film director
- Years active: 1922–1939

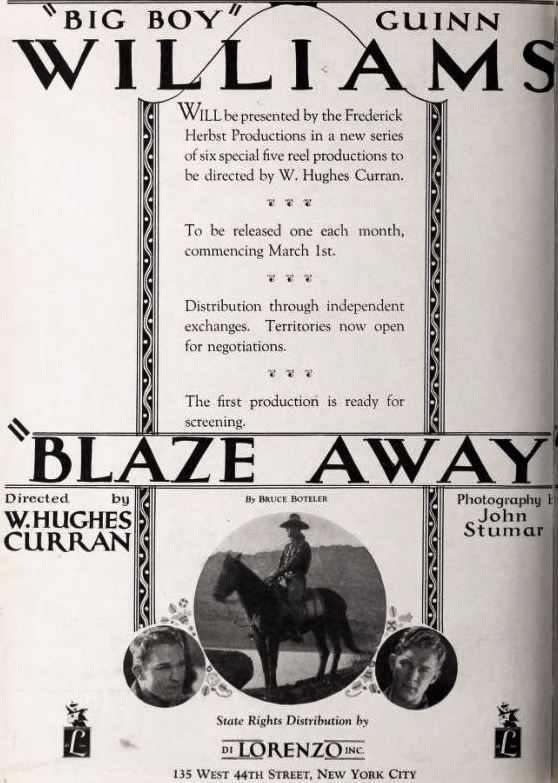
Advertisement for Blaze Away

William Hughes Curran (June 18 1893 – January 6, 1940) was an American film director. He directed several Western films.

He was an assistant director to Lambert Hillyer at William S. Hart Productions before heading the production unit for Famous Players–Lasky executives' spinoff Di Lorenzo, Inc.

He directed an early nickelodeon adaptation of William Shakespeare's Taming of the Shrew.

According to IMDb he wrote The Freshie and Broadway Buckaroo and appeared as Pablo in Blaze Away.

== Filmography ==
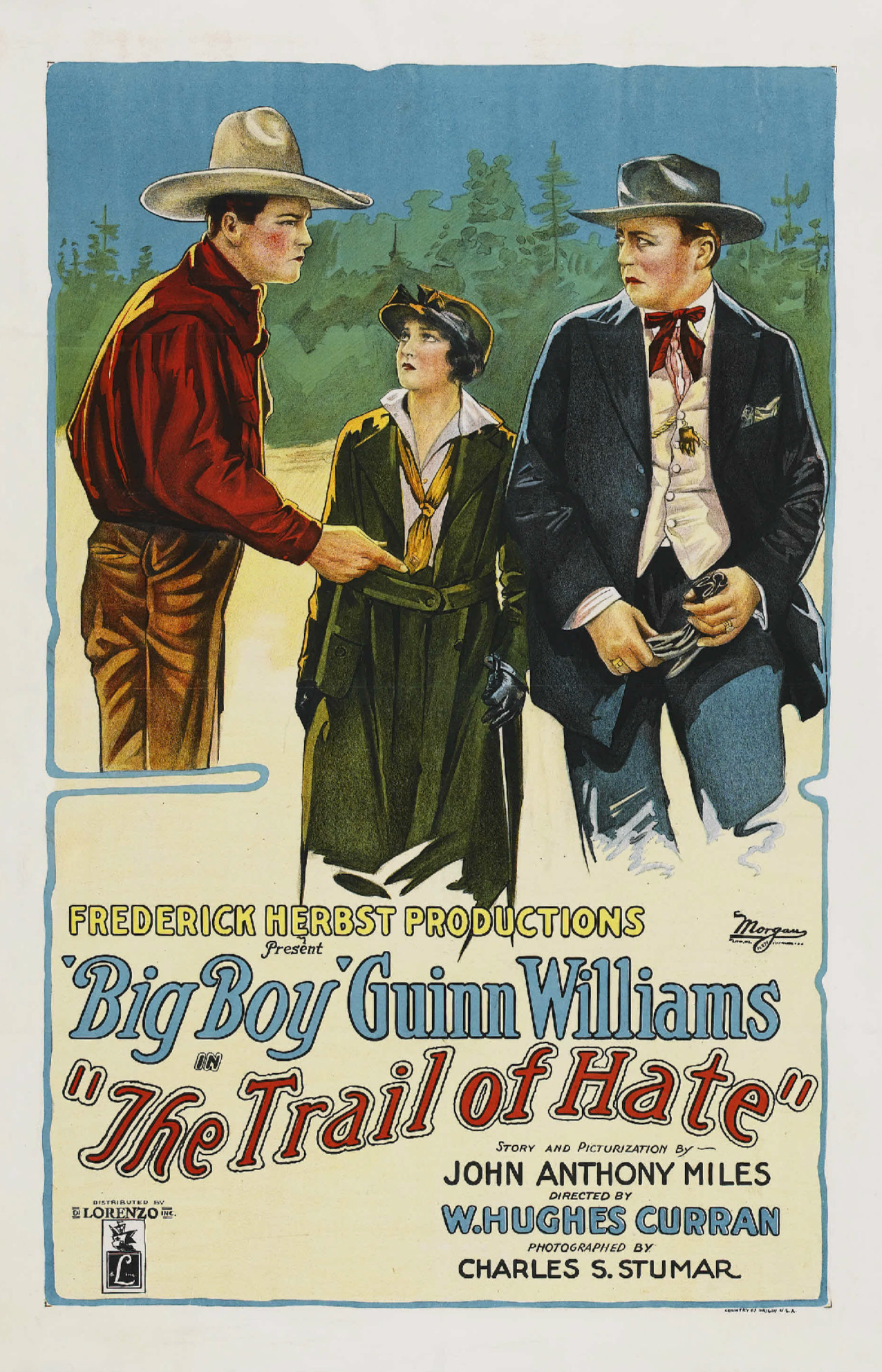
The Trail of Hate poster

- The Trail of Hate (1922)
- Blaze Away (1922)
- The Freshie (1922), Curran wrote the story and directed the film
- Dangerous Hour (1923)
- Prepared to Die (1923)
- The Knock on the Door (1923)
- Westbound (1924)
- The Taming of the Shrew (1925)
- The Merchant of Weenies (1925)
- Battling Romeo (1925)
- Scarlet Youth (1928)
- Trial Marriage (1928)
- Unguarded Girls (1929)
