= Blaze Away (1922 film) =

1922 film

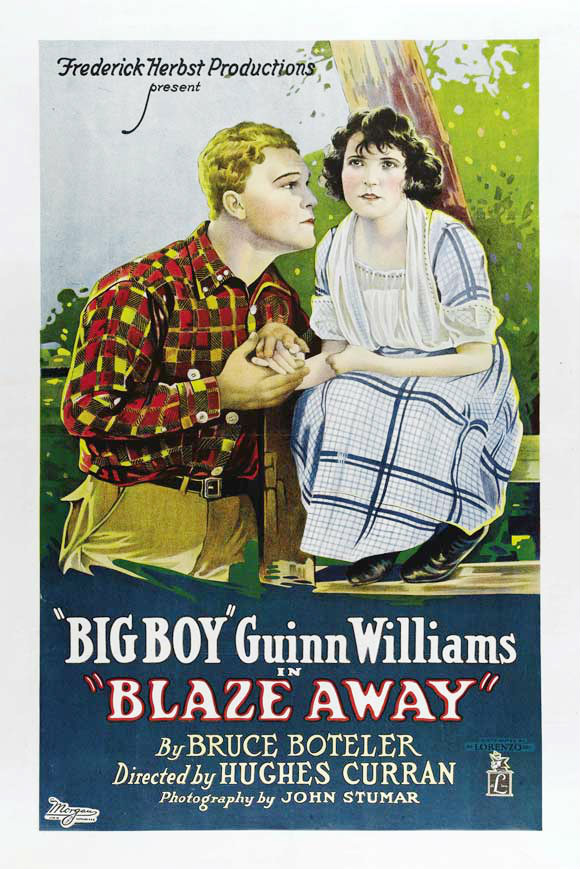
- Directed by: William Hughes Curran
- Written by: Bruce Boteler
- Produced by: Frederick Herbst
- Starring: Guinn 'Big Boy' Williams; Molly Malone; Hal Wilson
- Cinematography: John Stumar
- Production company: Frederick Herbst Productions
- Distributed by: Di Lorenzo Inc.
- Release date: October 1922
- Running time: 50 minutes
- Country: United States
- Languages: Silent; English intertitles

Blaze Away is a 1922 American silent Western film directed by William Hughes Curran and starring Guinn 'Big Boy' Williams, Molly Malone and Hal Wilson.

== Cast ==
- Guinn 'Big Boy' Williams as Big Boy
- Molly Malone as Molly Melody
- Hal Wilson as Pop Melody
- Edward Burns as Bill Lang
- Edward W. Borman as Tuck Martin
- William Hughes Curran as Pablo

== Preservation ==
With no holdings located in archives, Blaze Away is considered a lost film.

== Bibliography ==
- Connelly, Robert B. The Silents: Silent Feature Films, 1910-36, Volume 40, Issue 2. December Press, 1998.
- Munden, Kenneth White. The American Film Institute Catalog of Motion Pictures Produced in the United States, Part 1. University of California Press, 1997.
