= Ren Shields =

American folk musician and songwriter (1868–1913)

Ren Shields was an American folk musician born in 1868 in Chicago, Illinois. He died on 25 October 1913 in Massapequa, New York. He co-wrote the song with George "Honey Boy" Evans "In the Good Old Summer Time", (a part of which is sung by Laurel and Hardy in Below Zero (1930 film)), amongst other songs, such as "Dreamy Eyes", and "Come, take a Trip in My Air-ship".

== Biography ==
He was the lyricist for turn of century popular song Steamboat Bill with music by Bert Leighton. He was a member of the vaudeville team of Shields and Maximillian. He was also a member of the Friars, White Rats, the Vaudeville Comedy Club.

== His other Popular Songs ==
- "Come, take a trip in my Air-ship."

Ren Shields (lyricist); George Evans (composer) (Chas. K. Harris, 1911)

- Don't Forget to Write Me Everyday.

Ren Shields (lyricist); Geo. Christie (composer) (M. Witmark & Sons, 1908)

- Dreamy Eyes.

Ren Shields (lyricist); George Evans (composer) (Jerome H. Remick & Co., 1905)

- Go Easy Mable.

Ren Shields (lyricist); Will D. Cobb (composer); Ed. Moran (composer); J. Fred Helf (composer) (Hitland Music Publishers 1418 Broadway, 1909)

- Harry Tracy. A Desperate Ditty.

Ren Shields (lyricist); Bros (composer) (F.B. Haviland Publ. Co., New Zealand Building, Broadway & 37th St., 1911)

- In the Good Old Summer Time. Waltz Song.

Ren Shields (lyricist); George Evans (composer) (Howley, Haviland & Dresser, 1260-1266 Broadway, 1902)

- Papa, Please Buy Me an Airship

Ren Shields (lyricist); Kerry Mills (composer) (F.A. Mills, 122 W. 36th St., 1909)

- The Recipe For Love.

Ren Shields (lyricist); Percy Wenrich (composer) (Jos. W. Stern & Co., 102-104 W. 38th St., 1908)

- Whoop! Whoop! Whoop! Make a Noise like a Hoop and Roll Away.

Ren Shields (lyricist(); J. Fred Helf (composer) (Hitland Music Publishers 1418 Broadway, 1908)

- Steamboat Bill.

Ren Shields (lyricist); Leighton Bros (composer) (F.A. Mills, 122 West 36th St., 1910)

- The Hoola Boola Glide 1911

Ren Shields (lyricist) George Christie (composer) (M. Witmark & Sons)

== Death ==
Shortly before his death he became penniless stemming from developing a form of dementia which disabled him to take care of his affairs. Some of his theatrical colleagues looked after him.
