= Bessie Love filmography =

Filmography of American–British actress Bessie Love

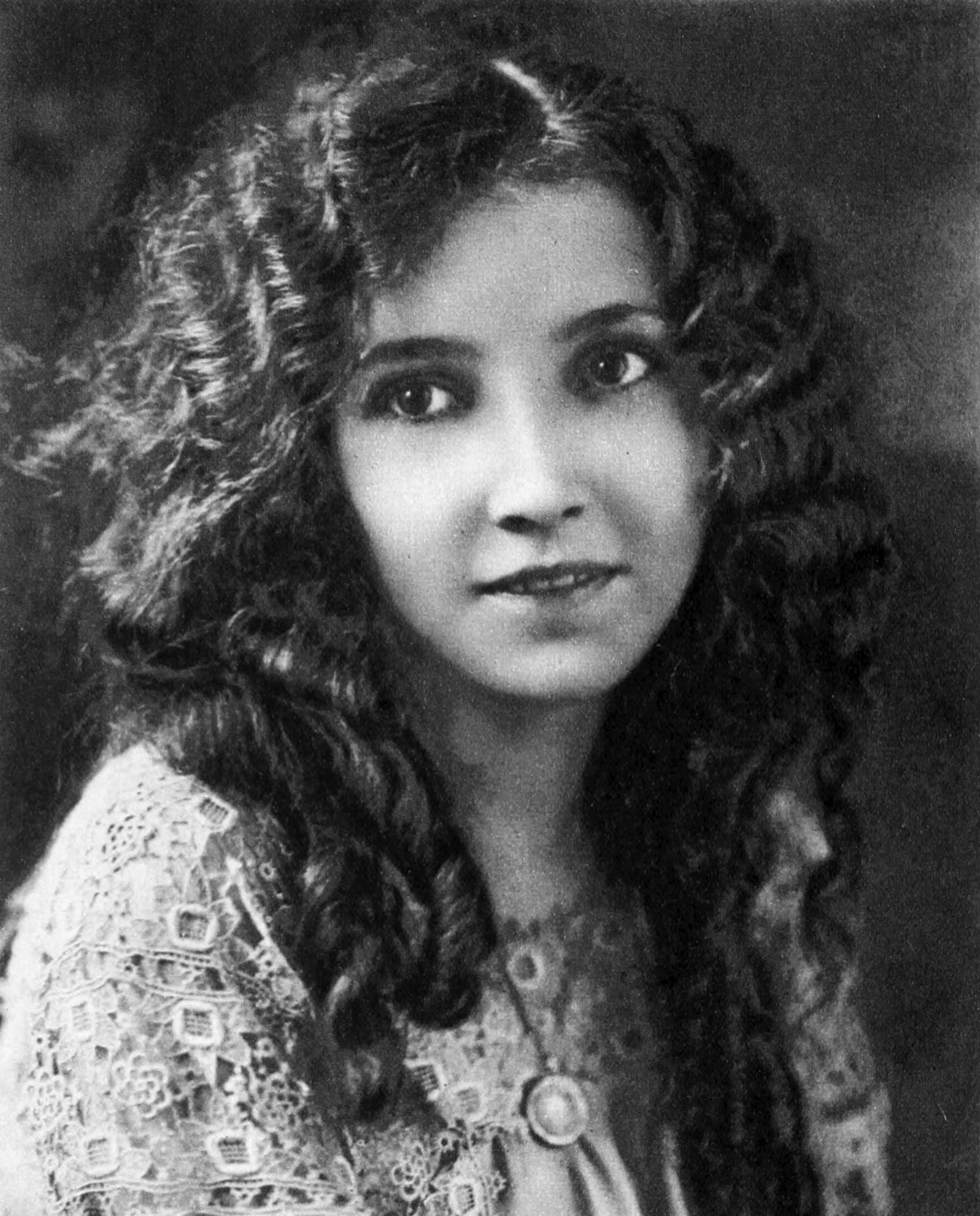
- Love in 1919
- Film: 123
- Television series: 39
- Theatre: 36

Bessie Love (1898–1986) was an actress whose career began in silent films, and continued into sound films, radio, and television. She was also active in the theatre. Her early career was exclusively in American film; after she moved to England in 1935, she performed in productions made only in the U.K., and British productions made in Europe.

== Film ==
=== Silent: 1916–1928 ===
==== Triangle Fine Arts ====
Love began her career at Triangle Fine Arts, having been discovered by D. W. Griffith.

| Release date | Title | Role | Director | Studio(s) / Distributor(s) | Preservation status | Notes |
|---|---|---|---|---|---|---|
| February 6, 1916 | Acquitted | Helen Carter | Paul Powell | Fine Arts / Triangle | Lost | |
| March 12, 1916 | The Flying Torpedo | Hulda | John B. O'Brien, Christy Cabanne | Fine Arts / Triangle | Lost | |
| April 9, 1916 | The Aryan | Mary Jane Garth | William S. Hart, Reginald Barker, Clifford Smith | Triangle | Incomplete | |
| April 21, 1916 | The Good Bad-Man | Amy | Allan Dwan | Fine Arts / Triangle | Survives | |
| June 11, 1916 | Reggie Mixes In | Agnes | Christy Cabanne | Fine Arts / Triangle | Survives | |
| June 11, 1916 | The Mystery of the Leaping Fish | The Little Fish Blower | John Emerson, Christy Cabanne | Triangle | Survives | Short film |
| July 23, 1916 | Stranded | The Girl | Lloyd Ingraham | Fine Arts / Triangle | Lost | |
| August 20, 1916 | Hell-to-Pay Austin | Briar Rose "Nettles" Dawson | Paul Powell | Fine Arts / Triangle | Lost | |
| September 5, 1916 | Intolerance | The Bride | D. W. Griffith | Triangle | Survives | |
| October 29, 1916 | A Sister of Six | Prudence | Chester M. Franklin, Sidney Franklin | Fine Arts / Triangle | Incomplete | |
| December 1916 (Note: Various publications provide different release dates: December 21, 23, and 24.) | The Heiress at Coffee Dan's | Waffles | Edward Dillon | Fine Arts / Triangle | Lost | |
| January 21, 1917 | Nina, the Flower Girl | Nina | Lloyd Ingraham | Fine Arts / Triangle | Lost | |
| March 18, 1917 | A Daughter of the Poor | Rose Eastman | Edward Dillon | Fine Arts / Triangle | Incomplete | |
| April 15, 1917 | Cheerful Givers | Judy | Paul Powell | Fine Arts / Triangle | Lost | |
| July 15, 1917 | The Sawdust Ring | Janet Magie | Charles Miller, Paul Powell | New York Motion Picture Corporation / Triangle | Survives | |
| August 19, 1917 | Wee Lady Betty | Wee Lady Betty | Charles Miller, Frank Borzage (uncredited) | Triangle | Lost | |
| September 9, 1917 | Polly Ann | Polly Ann | Charles Miller | Triangle | Lost | |

==== Pathé Exchange ====
In 1918, Pathé Exchange was looking for a new star, and convinced Love to leave Triangle Fine Arts for a salary of $2000/week (Note: Pathé's first choice was Mary Pickford, who was too expensive.) (equivalent to $42,000 in 2024). The contract empowered her to choose her own cameraman; she selected future Academy Award-winner Clyde De Vinna.

Love made four films with Pathé. They received mixed-to-negative reviews, although Love's performances were consistently praised. Originally released in 1918 and 1919 as 5-reel films, three of the films were edited down to 3 reels, and re-released in 1922 as "Pathé Playlets".

Carolyn of the Corners, Love's final film with Pathé, was released after the first films of her subsequent Vitagraph contract were released, as were the Pathé Playlets.

| Release dates | | Title | Role | Director | Studio(s) / Distributor(s) | Preservation status | Notes |
| Original | Re-release | Title | Role | Director | Studio(s) / Distributor(s) | Preservation status | Notes |
|---|---|---|---|---|---|---|---|
| March 10, 1918 | August 6, 1922 | The Great Adventure | Rags | Alice Guy-Blaché | Pathé Exchange | Survives | |
| May 5, 1918 | Not re-released | How Could You, Caroline? | Caroline Rogers | Frederick A. Thomson | Pathé Exchange | Lost | |
| June 30, 1918 | August 6, 1922 | A Little Sister of Everybody | Celeste Janvier | Robert Thornby | Anderson-Brunton / Pathé Exchange | Lost | |
| March 9, 1919 | June 11, 1922 | Carolyn of the Corners | Carolyn May Cameron | Robert Thornby | Pathé Exchange | Lost | |

==== Vitagraph ====
In 1918, Love signed a nine-film contract with Vitagraph, all of which were made, and all of which were directed by David Smith.

| Release date | Title | Role | Director | Studio(s) / Distributor(s) | Preservation status | Notes |
|---|---|---|---|---|---|---|
| December 2, 1918 | The Dawn of Understanding | Sue Prescott | David Smith | Vitagraph | Lost | |
| January 27, 1919 | The Enchanted Barn | Shirley Hollister | David Smith | Vitagraph | Lost | |
| March 10, 1919 | The Wishing Ring Man | Joy Havenith | David Smith | Vitagraph | Lost | |
| April 21, 1919 | A Yankee Princess | Patsy O'Reilly | David Smith | Vitagraph | Lost | Love also wrote the scenario |
| June 2, 1919 | The Little Boss | Peggy Winston, the little boss | David Smith | Vitagraph | Lost | |
| July 12, 1919 | Cupid Forecloses | Geraldine Farleigh | David Smith | Vitagraph | Survives | |
| September 21, 1919 | Over the Garden Wall | Peggy Gordon | David Smith | Vitagraph | Lost | |
| November 16, 1919 | A Fighting Colleen | Alannah Malone | David Smith | Vitagraph | Lost | |
| January 11, 1920 | Pegeen | Pegeen O'Neill | David Smith | Vitagraph | Lost | |

==== Andrew J. Callaghan Productions ====
All were box-office failures.

| Release date | Title | Role | Director | Studio(s) / Distributor(s) | Preservation status | Notes |
|---|---|---|---|---|---|---|
| October 17, 1920 | Bonnie May | Bonnie May | Joseph De Grasse, Ida May Park | Andrew J. Callaghan Productions / Federated Film Exchanges | Lost | |
| December 1920 | The Midlanders | Aurelie Lindstrom | Joseph De Grasse, Ida May Park | Andrew J. Callaghan Productions / Federated Film Exchanges | Incomplete | |
| May 7, 1921 | Penny of Top Hill Trail | Penny | Arthur Berthelet | Andrew J. Callaghan Productions / Federated Film Exchanges | Lost | |

==== Free agent ====
After the failures of her Callaghan-produced films, Love fired her manager, and became a free agent.

She appeared in two series of short films headlined by other actors: The Santschi Series (Tom Santschi) and The Strange Adventures of Prince Courageous (Arthur Trimble).

| Release date | Title | Role | Director | Studio(s) / Distributor(s) | Preservation status | Notes |
|---|---|---|---|---|---|---|
| October 16, 1921 | The Honor of Rameriz | The Geologist's Wife | Robert North Bradbury | Pathé Exchange | Lost | Short film; Series: Santschi Series |
| October 30, 1921 | The Spirit of the Lake | | Robert North Bradbury | Pathé Exchange | Lost | Short film; Series: Santschi Series |
| October 30, 1921 | The Swamp | Mary | Colin Campbell | Robertson–Cole | Survives | |
| December 5, 1921 | The Sea Lion | Blossom Nelson | Rowland V. Lee | Associated Producers | Survives | |
| March 19, 1922 | The Vermilion Pencil | Hyacinth | Norman Dawn | Robertson–Cole | Lost | |
| July 23, 1922 | Forget Me Not | Ann, the girl | W. S. Van Dyke | Metro Pictures | Lost | |
| August 1922 | Bulldog Courage | Gloria Phillips | Edward A. Kull | Russell Productions / State Rights | Survives | |
| November 2, 1922 | The Village Blacksmith | Rosemary Martin, the daughter | John Ford | Fox Film | Incomplete | |
| November 15, 1922 | Night Life in Hollywood | Herself | Fred Caldwell | A.B. Maescher Productions / Arrow Film Corporation | Incomplete | |
| December 1, 1922 | Deserted at the Altar | Anna Moore, the country girl | William K. Howard | Phil Goldstone | Survives | |
| January 7, 1923 | Three Who Paid | John Caspar / Virginia Cartwright | Colin Campbell | Fox Film | Lost | |
| January 21, 1923 | The Ghost Patrol | Effie Kugler | Nat Ross | Universal Pictures | Lost | |
| March 27, 1923 | Souls for Sale | Herself | Rupert Hughes | Goldwyn Pictures | Survives | |
| April 7, 1923 | The Little Knight | Bernice | Frederick G. Becker | Arthur Trimble Productions / Anchor | Survives | Short film; Series: The Strange Adventures of Prince Courageous |
| 1923 | The Love Charm | Bernice | Frederick G. Becker | Arthur Trimble Productions / Anchor | Unknown | Short film; Series: The Strange Adventures of Prince Courageous |
| 1923 | The Crown of Courage | Bernice | Frederick G. Becker | Arthur Trimble Productions / Anchor | Unknown | Short film; Series: The Strange Adventures of Prince Courageous |
| May 10, 1923 | The Purple Dawn | Mui Far | Charles R. Seeling | Aywon / State Rights | Lost | |
| May 22, 1923 | Mary of the Movies | Herself | John McDermott | Columbia / Robertson–Cole / Film Booking Offices | Incomplete | |
| June 17, 1923 | Human Wreckage | Mary Finnegan | John Griffith Wray | Thomas H. Ince Corporation / Film Booking Offices | Lost | |
| September 23, 1923 | The Eternal Three | Hilda Gray | Marshall Neilan, Frank Urson | Goldwyn Pictures | Lost | |
| September 30, 1923 | St. Elmo | Edna Earle | Jerome Storm | Fox Film | Lost | |
| October 14, 1923 | Slave of Desire | Pauline Gaudin | George D. Baker | Goldwyn Pictures | Survives | |
| December 24, 1923 | Gentle Julia | Julia | Rowland V. Lee | Fox Film | Lost | |
| February 11, 1924 | Torment | Marie | Maurice Tourneur | Tourneur / Associated First National | Lost | |
| April 20, 1924 | The Woman on the Jury | Grace Pierce | Harry O. Hoyt | Associated First National | Lost | |
| April 28, 1924 | Those Who Dance | Veda Carney | Lambert Hillyer | Thomas H. Ince Corporation / Associated First National | Lost | |
| October 5, 1924 | The Silent Watcher | Mary Roberts | Frank Lloyd | First National Pictures | Lost | |
| October 12, 1924 | Dynamite Smith | Violet | Ralph Ince | Thomas H. Ince Corporation / Pathé Exchange | Survives | |
| November 30, 1924 | Sundown | Ellen Crawley | Laurence Trimble, Harry O. Hoyt | First National Pictures | Lost | |
| December 15, 1924 | Tongues of Flame | Lahleet | Joseph Henabery | Famous Players–Lasky / Paramount Pictures | Lost | |
| February 2, 1925 | The Lost World | Paula White | Harry O. Hoyt | First National Pictures | Survives | |
| May 3, 1925 | Soul-Fire | Teita | John S. Robertson | Inspiration Pictures / First National Pictures | Survives | |
| September 28, 1925 | A Son of His Father | Nora Shea | Victor Fleming | Famous Players–Lasky / Paramount Pictures | Lost | |
| October 12, 1925 | New Brooms | Geraldine Marsh | William C. deMille | Famous Players–Lasky / Paramount Pictures | Lost | |
| October 25, 1925 | The King on Main Street | Gladys Humphreys | Monta Bell | Famous Players–Lasky / Paramount Pictures | Survives | |
| February 28, 1926 | The Song and Dance Man | Leola Lane | Herbert Brenon | Famous Players–Lasky / Paramount Pictures | Incomplete | |
| June 26, 1926 | Lovey Mary | Lovey Mary | King Baggot | Metro-Goldwyn-Mayer | Incomplete | |
| October 11, 1926 | Young April | Victoria | Donald Crisp | Producers Distributing Corporation | Survives | |
| December 12, 1926 | Going Crooked | Marie Farley | George Melford | Fox Film | Survives | |
| Not released (filmed in 1927) | The American | Jane Wilton | J. Stuart Blackton | Natural Vision Pictures | Lost | Never released theatrically |
| February 7, 1927 | Rubber Tires | Mary Ellen Stack | Alan Hale, Sr. | Producers Distributing Corporation | Survives | |
| October 10, 1927 | A Harp in Hock | Nora Banks | Renaud Hoffman | DeMille Pictures / Pathé Exchange | Lost | |
| November 11, 1927 | Dress Parade | Janet Cleghorne | Donald Crisp | Pathé Exchange | Survives | |
| March 14, 1928 | The Matinee Idol | Ginger Bolivar | Frank Capra | Columbia Pictures | Survives | |
| July 15, 1928 | Sally of the Scandals | Sally Rand | Lynn Shores | Film Booking Offices | Survives | |
| September 9, 1928 | Anybody Here Seen Kelly? | Mitzi Lavelle | William Wyler | Universal Pictures | Lost | |

=== Sound: 1928–1983 ===
All of Love's sound films are extant.

| Year | Title | Role | Studio(s) / Distributor(s) | Notes |
|---|---|---|---|---|
| 1928 | The Swell Head | | Warner Vitaphone | Short film |
| 1929 | The Broadway Melody | Hank Mahoney | Metro-Goldwyn-Mayer | Nominated—Academy Award for Best Actress |
| 1929 | The Idle Rich | Helen Thayer | Metro-Goldwyn-Mayer | |
| 1929 | The Hollywood Revue of 1929 | Herself | Metro-Goldwyn-Mayer | |
| 1929 | The Girl in the Show | Hattie Hartley | Metro-Goldwyn-Mayer | |
| 1930 | Chasing Rainbows | Carlie Seymour | Metro-Goldwyn-Mayer | Missing Technicolor scenes |
| 1930 | They Learned About Women | Mary Collins | Metro-Goldwyn-Mayer | |
| 1930 | Conspiracy | Margaret Holt | RKO Pictures | |
| 1930 | Good News | Babe | Metro-Goldwyn-Mayer | Missing Technicolor ending |
| 1930 | See America Thirst | Ellen | Universal Pictures | |
| 1931 | Morals for Women | Helen Huston | Tiffany Pictures | |
| 1936 | I Live Again | Kathleen Vernon | G.B. Morgan Productions / National Provincial Film Distributors | |
| 1941 | Atlantic Ferry | Begonia Baggot | Warner Brothers | |
| 1945 | London Scrapbook | Herself | Spectator Short Films | Short film |
| 1945 | Journey Together | Mrs. Mary McWilliams | RKO Pictures | |
| 1951 | No Highway in the Sky | Aircraft passenger | Twentieth Century-Fox Film Corp. | Uncredited |
| 1951 | The Magic Box | Wedding group member | British Lion Films | |
| 1954 | The Weak and the Wicked | Prisoner | | |
| 1954 | The Barefoot Contessa | Mrs. Eubanks | Figaro / United Artists | |
| 1954 | Beau Brummell | Maid | Metro-Goldwyn-Mayer | Uncredited |
| 1955 | Touch and Go | Mrs. Baxter | Ealing Studios / J. Arthur Rank Film Distributors / Universal Pictures | |
| 1957 | The Story of Esther Costello | Matron in art gallery | Romulus Films / Columbia Pictures | |
| 1958 | Next to No Time | Becky Wiener | Montpelier / British Lion Film Corporation | |
| 1958 | Nowhere to Go | Harriet P. Jefferson | Ealing Studios / Metro-Goldwyn-Mayer | |
| 1959 | Too Young to Love | Mrs. Busch | Welbeck Films Ltd. / J. Arthur Rank Film Distributors | |
| 1961 | The Greengage Summer | American tourist | PKL Productions / Victor Saville-Edward Small Productions / Columbia Pictures | |
| 1961 | The Roman Spring of Mrs. Stone | Bunny | Warner Bros. / Seven Arts / Warner-Pathé Distributors / Warner Bros. Pictures | Costar Warren Beatty later directed Love in Reds |
| 1963 | The Wild Affair | Marjorie's mother | Bryanston Films / British Lion Films | |
| 1963 | Children of the Damned | Mrs. Robbins, Mark's grandmother | Metro-Goldwyn-Mayer | |
| 1964 | I Think They Call Him John | Co-narrator (with Victor Spinetti) | Samaritan Films | Short film |
| 1965 | Promise Her Anything | Pet shop customer | Seven Arts Productions / Paramount Pictures | |
| 1967 | Battle Beneath the Earth | Matron | Metro-Goldwyn-Mayer | |
| 1967 | I'll Never Forget What's'isname | American tourist | J. Arthur Rank Film Distributors | |
| 1968 | Isadora | Mrs. Duncan | Universal Pictures | |
| 1969 | On Her Majesty's Secret Service | Baccarat player | Eon-Danilag Productions | Uncredited |
| 1971 | Sunday Bloody Sunday | Answering service lady | Vectia / United Artists | |
| 1971 | Catlow | Mrs. Frost | Metro-Goldwyn-Mayer | |
| 1974 | Vampyres | American lady | Cambist Films / Cinépix Film Properties Inc. | |
| 1976 | The Ritz | Maurine | Warner Bros. | |
| 1977 | Gulliver's Travels | | Arrow Films / Sunn Classic Pictures | Voice |
| 1981 | Reds | Mrs. Partlow | Barclays Mercantile / Industrial Finance / JRS Productions / Paramount Pictures | Director Warren Beatty was Love's costar in The Roman Spring of Mrs. Stone |
| 1981 | Ragtime | Old lady (T.O.C.) | Paramount Pictures | |
| 1981 | Lady Chatterley's Lover | Flora | Cannon Films / Columbia Pictures | |
| 1983 | The Hunger | Lillybelle | Metro-Goldwyn-Mayer / MGM/UA Entertainment Co | |

== Stage ==
| Year | Title | Role | Venue / Location | Notes | Ref. |
|---|---|---|---|---|---|
| 1928 | Burlesque | Bonny | San Francisco | | |
| 1928 | Merry Ann Idea | | Touring production | A one-woman, Fanchon and Marco stage revue | |
| 1930 | Whispering Friends | | El Capitan Theatre, Hollywood | | |
| 1931 | Vaudeville show | | Palace Theatre, New York; Touring production | | |
| 1936 | Stop and Go | | Touring production | A C. B. Cochran revue | |
| 1936 | Lucky Stars | | Touring production | | |
| 1938 | The Women | | Lyric Theatre, London | Understudy | |
| 1944 | Love in Idleness | Miss Dell | Lyric Theatre, London; Touring production | Replaced Peggy Dear | |
| 1945 | Zenobia | The Actress | Granville Theatre, Walham Green | | |
| 1945 | Say It With Flowers | Julie | Granville Theatre, Walham Green | | |
| 1947 | Born Yesterday | Mrs. Hedges | Garrick Theatre, London | | |
| 1948 | Native Son | Miss Emmet | Bolton's Theatre Club, London | | |
| 1949 | Death of a Salesman | Laughing Woman | Phoenix Theatre, London | | |
| 1949 | The Male Animal | Myrtle Keller | New Wimbledon Theatre, London | Also performed the role on television in 1956 | |
| 1951 | The Glass Menagerie | Amanda Wingfield | Touring production | | |
| 1953 | The Season's Greetings | Lucy Barlow | Q Theatre, London | | |
| 1954 | The Wooden Dish | Bessie Bockser | Phoenix Theatre, London | | |
| 1954 | Mother Is a Darling | Dulcie Lander | New Theatre, Bromley | | |
| 1955 | The Children's Hour | Mrs. Lily Mortar | Arts Theatre, London | | |
| 1955 | South | Mrs. Priolieau | Arts Theatre, London | Performed the role again in 1961 | |
| 1955 | A Girl Called Jo | Mrs. Kirke | Piccadilly Theatre, London | | |
| 1956 | Someone to Talk To | Miss Froslyn | Duchess Theatre, London | | |
| 1958 | The Homecoming | Babe Love | Perth Theatre, Perth, Scotland | Written by Love | |
| 1959 | Orpheus Descending | The Nurse | Royal Court Theatre, London | | |
| 1960 | Visit to a Small Planet | Reba Spelding | Westminster Theatre, London | | |
| 1961 | South | Mrs. Priolieau | Criterion Theatre, London | Had previously performed the role in 1955 | |
| 1962 | Gentlemen Prefer Blondes | Mrs. Ella Spofford | Princes Theatre, London; Strand Theatre, London | Playwright Anita Loos had attended Love's wedding in 1929 | |
| 1963 | Never Too Late | Grace Kimborough | Prince of Wales Theatre, London | | |
| 1964 | Saint Joan of the Stockyards | A Worker | Queen's Theatre, London | | |
| 1964 | In White America | The White Woman | Arts Theatre, London | | |
| 1966 | The Silence of Lee Harvey Oswald | Marguerite Oswald | Hampstead Theatre Club, London | | |
| 1968 | Sweet Bird of Youth | Aunt Nonnie | Palace Theatre, Watford | | |
| 1970 | Harvey | Mrs. Gaffney | Touring production | | |
| 1971 | The Heiress | Lavinia Penniman | Touring production | | |
| 1971 | West of Suez | Mrs Dekker | Royal Court Theatre, London | | |
| 1972 | Gone with the Wind | Aunt Pittypat | Theatre Royal, Drury Lane, London | | |
| 1979 | The Woman I Love | Aunt Bessie Merryman | Touring production | | |

== Television ==
| Year(s) | Title | Role | Notes | Ref. |
|---|---|---|---|---|
| 1946 | Mr. Know-All | | | |
| 1947 | You Can't Take It with You | Penelope Sycamore | Television film | |
| 1948 | The Front Page | Mrs. Grant | Television film | |
| 1952 | Mystery Story | Grace Jones | | |
| 1953 | The Hero | Harriet Quinn | | |
| 1954, 1957, 1958 | BBC Sunday-Night Theatre | Various | 7 episodes | |
| 1954 | Queen's Folly | Mrs. Temple | | |
| 1955 | London Playhouse | Mrs. Goren | Episode: "The Glorification of Al Toolum" | |
| 1956 | The Male Animal | Myrtle Keller | Television film; Love had previously performed the role in the stage production at the New Wimbledon Theatre in 1949 | |
| 1957, 1960 | ITV Television Playhouse | Various | 3 episodes | |
| 1957, 1959 | ITV Play of the Week | Various | 3 episodes | |
| 1958 | Long Distance | Mrs. MacLean | Television short | |
| 1959 | Saturday Playhouse | Mrs. Stykeley-Mosher | Episode: "Golden Rain" | |
| 1960 | Emergency – Ward 10 | Mrs. Broom | Episode: "Mrs. Broom" | |
| 1960 | Don't Do It, Dempsey! | Mrs. Glenton | Episode: "Visiting Firemen" | |
| 1960 | International Detective | Various | 2 episodes | |
| 1961 | Harpers West One | Customer | 1 episode | |
| 1962 | Zero One | Mrs. Glorny | Episode: "Gunpoint to Shannon" | |
| 1962 | Man of the World | Mrs. Van Kempson | Episode: "Portrait of a Girl" | |
| 1962 | The Andromeda Breakthrough | Mrs. Neilson | Episode: "Gale Warning" | |
| 1962 | BBC Sunday-Night Play | Mrs. Marshall | Episode: "Means to an End" | |
| 1963 | This Is Your Life | Herself | Reality documentary | |
| 1963 | The Sentimental Agent | Mamie | Episode: "Never Play Cards with Strangers" | |
| 1964 | Story Parade | Mrs. Arquette | Episode: "A Kiss Before Dying" | |
| 1965 | The Wednesday Play | Martha Burroughs | Episode: "The Pistol" | |
| 1966 | The Poppy Is Also a Flower | | Television film; uncredited | |
| 1968 | ITV Playhouse | Mrs. Teitelbaum | Episode: "Bon Voyage" | |
| 1968 | Late Night Line-Up | Herself | | |
| 1969 | Randall and Hopkirk (Deceased) | Mrs. Trotter | Episode: "When Did You Start to Stop Seeing Things?" | |
| 1969 | Omnibus | | Episode: "Where Are You Going to My Pretty Maid?" | |
| 1969 | British Film Comedy | Becky | Episode: "Next to No Time" | |
| 1970 | W. Somerset Maugham | American lady | Episode: "Jane" | |
| 1970 | Kate | Lady Hartford-Cape | Episode: "A Good Spec" | |
| 1971 | Great Day | Herself | | |
| 1971 | Public Eye | Chrissy Husack | Episode: "The Beater and the Game" | |
| 1971 | From a Bird's Eye View | Old Lady | Episode: "Family Tree" | |
| 1973 | Pollyanna | Mrs. Snow | Miniseries | |
| 1974 | Mousey | Mrs. Richardson | Television film | |
| 1975 | Shades of Greene | St. Louis Woman | Episode: "Cheap in August" | |
| 1976 | Katy | Mrs. Finch | 3 episodes | |
| 1977 | Good Afternoon! | Herself | | |
| 1978 | Edward & Mrs. Simpson | Maud Cunard | Miniseries | |
| 1978 | The Hollywood Greats | Herself | Documentary series | |
| 1980 | Hollywood: A Celebration of the American Silent Film | Herself | Documentary series | |
| 1980 | Nationwide | Herself | | |

== Radio ==
| Date | Title | Role | Ref. |
|---|---|---|---|
| August 31, 1942 | Ladies' Man | Anita | |
| October 30, 1942 | Paul Temple Intervenes: "The October Hotel" | Maisie | |
| November 26, 1943 | Entertainment Annual | | |
| October 3, 1944 | News Headlines | Host | |
| October 8, 1944 | Variety Band-Box | Host | |
| January 30, 1946 | Vic Oliver Introduces... | | |
| January 19, 1947 | Scrapbook for 1925 | | |
| March 6, 1954 | Theatre Royal: "The Outcasts of Poker Flat" | | |
| December 4, 1954 | Saturday-Night Theatre: "The Old Reliable" | Adela Cork | |
| June 16, 1955 | Melville's Choice | | |
| July 30, 1955 | Saturday-Night Theatre | | |
| April 18, 1957 | Woman's Hour | Narrator | |
| August 8, 1957 | Desert Island Discs | Herself | |
| December 29, 1961 | I Remember | Herself | |
| December 31, 1963 | Hollywood Memories | Herself | |
| March 21, 1966 | Illumination | Sister Constance Soulsby | |
| July 13, 1968 | Afternoon Theatre | | |
| March 28, 1970 | Saturday-Night Theatre: "Mrs. Gibbons' Boys" | Mrs. Gibbons | |
| September 18, 1975 | Afternoon Theatre | | |
| August 23, 1977 | Spoon River | | |
| September 12, 1977 | Star Sound | Herself | |
| February 27, 1978 | The Monday Play: "Dark" by Victor Pemberton | Virginia's mother | |
| March 5, 1978 | Afternoon Theatre | | |

== Erroneous credits ==
Love mistakenly has been identified as being in the cast of The Birth of a Nation (1915) as "a Piedmont girl", but she took steps in her later years to clarify that she was not in the film.

The Internet Movie Database lists Love as appearing in a 1915 film entitled Georgia Pearce. "Georgia Pearce" was actually the stage name used by actress Constance Talmadge for one of her roles in Intolerance, and it is not the name of a film.

Some sources include Love in the cast of Meet the Prince (1926). However, no contemporaneous sources do, and some sources note this as an error.

Love does not include any of the above films in her autobiography's filmography.
