= Means to an end =

A means to an end is a method for achieving a goal. It forms the basis for instrumentalism and the concept of instrumental value.

Means to an End (and other capitalizations) can also refer to:

== Music ==
=== Albums ===
- A Means to an End: The Music of Joy Division (1995), stylized END, tribute by various artists.
- The Means to an End (1997), EP by Epicure, Australian progressive rock.
- A Means to an End (1997), compilation by Voorhees, hardcore punk.
- Means to an End (2001), by Farse, English ska-punk.
- Means to an End (2005), by Biohazard, American hardcore.
- Means to an End (2016) EP by Message to the Masses, American metalcore.
- A Means To An End (2022), mixtape by Olivia O'Brien, American singer and songwriter.

=== Songs ===
- "Means to an End" (1968), from Traffic by Traffic, English rock.
- "A Means to an End" (1980), from Closer by Joy Division, English rock.
- "Means to an End" (1987), from Know Your Enemy by Lȧȧz Rockit, American thrash metal.
- "Means to an End" (1990), from Hellbent on Compromise by Edwyn Collins, Scottish musician.
- "Means to an End" (1991), from Toy Box by The Clay People, American rock.
- "A Means to an End" (1992), from The World Keeps Turning by Napalm Death, British grindcore.
- "Means To An End" (1995), from Guilty by Straight Faced, American rock.
- "Means to an End" (2001), from Injuring Yourself Whilst Making Music by Gyroscope, Australian rock.
- "Means To An End" (2003), from Welcome to Winners by Lowgold, English indie rock.
- "Means to an End" (2004), from Lost in a Garden of Clouds by Alpha, English post-trip hop.
- "Means to an End" (2005), from London Hyde Park 1969, by Blind Faith, English rock.
- "Means To An End" (2009), from Move Every Muscle, Make Every Sound by De Novo Dahl, Indie rock.
- "Means to an End" (2009), from With Echoes in the Movement of Stone by Minsk, extreme metal.
- "Means To An End" (2011), by Trent Dabbs on "The Birthday" from The Vampire Diaries.
- "Means to an End" (2012), from True Defiance by Demon Hunter, American Christian metal.
- "Means To An End" (2014), from Other World by English singer Peter Hammill and American guitarist Gary Lucas.
- "Means to an End" (2015), from Good Intent, by Press to Meco, English alternative rock.
- "Means to an End" (2017), from Strength in Numbers by The Haunted, Swedish heavy metal.
- "Means to an End" (2020), from Quadra, by Sepultura, Brazilian heavy metal.

== Television episodes ==
- "Means to an end" (1960), from Black Saddle, American Western.
- "Means to an End" (1962), from BBC Sunday-Night Play, British anthology drama.
- "Means to an End" (1977), from Police Woman, NBC American police procedural.
- "Means To An End" (1983), from Carson's Law, Australian legal period piece on the Ten Network.
- "Means to an End" (1999), from The City, Canadian drama.
- "A Means to an End" (2002), from Jeremiah on Showtime, American post-apocalyptic action drama.
- "Means to an End" (2002), from Night and Day, British mystery soap opera.
- "A Means to an End" (2003) from The Drew Carey Show, American sitcom on ABC.
- "Means to an End (2011), from CSI: NY, American police procedural drama.
- "A Means to an End" (2013), from Teen Mom 2, MTV American reality.
- "Means to an End" (2016), from Beauty & the Beast, America science fiction police procedural.
- "Means to an End" (2016), from NCIS: New Orleans, American police procedural drama.
- "Means to an End (2018), from I Am a Killer, a Netflix British crime documentary.

== Film ==
- Means To An End (2005), short horror by Paul Solet, American.
- A Means To An End (2007), by Fidelis Duker, Nigerian.

== Radio episodes ==
- The Means to an End (2013), from Afternoon Drama on BBC by Henry Lloyd-Hughes, English actor.

== Literature ==
- Means To An End (1975), novel by Lucy Gillen, Harlequin Romance.
- Means to an End (2008), poetry book by Toh Hsien Min, Singaporean.
- Means To An End (2009), short story by Loren L. Coleman, American science-fiction writer, in BattleTech: 25 Years of Art & Fiction.
- Means to an End: U.S. Interest in the International Criminal Court (2009), book by Tod Lindberg, American political expert.
- Means to an End: Apoptosis and Other Cell Death Mechanisms (2011), book by Douglas R. Green, American biologist.
- Means to an End: U.S. Interest and the International Criminal Court (2009), book by Lee A. Feinstein, American policy-scholar, and former diplomat.

== Other uses ==
- The Means to an End: A Shadow Drama in Five Acts (1995), etching and aquatint by Kara Walker, American contemporary painter.
- Means to an End (established 2005), annual festival hosted by The 1 in 12 Club, British punk/hardcore.

=== See also ===
- Social Justice: A Means to an End, an End in Itself (2010), report by the Canadian Nurses Association.
- the end justifies the means
