= Sweedie Learns to Swim =

- Produced by: Essanay Film Manufacturing Company
- Starring: Wallace Beery; Ben Turpin
- Distributed by: Essanay Film Manufacturing Company
- Release date: October 12, 1914
- Running time: One reel (10 minutes)
- Country: United States
- Language: Silent (English intertitles)

Sweedie Learns to Swim is a 1914 American silent short 1-reel comedy film starring Wallace Beery and Ben Turpin and produced and distributed by the Essanay Company.

This short survives in the Library of Congress collection, UCLA Film & Television Archive and others.

== Cast ==
- Wallace Beery as Sweedie
- Betty Brown as Mrs. Rich
- Ben Turpin as Captain of the Life Savers
- Leo White as Mr. Rich
- Charlotte Mineau
