= Pulling Teeth =

Pulling Teeth may refer to:

- Dental extraction in dentistry
- Pulling Teeth (band), a hardcore punk band from Baltimore, formed in 2005
- “(Anesthesia)—Pulling Teeth”, a bass solo by Cliff Burton on the 1983 Metallica album Kill 'Em All
- "Pulling Teeth", a song by Green Day from their 1994 album Dookie
- Pulling Teeth (album), a 2000 album by Straight Faced
