= The Boat (1921 film) =

1921 film

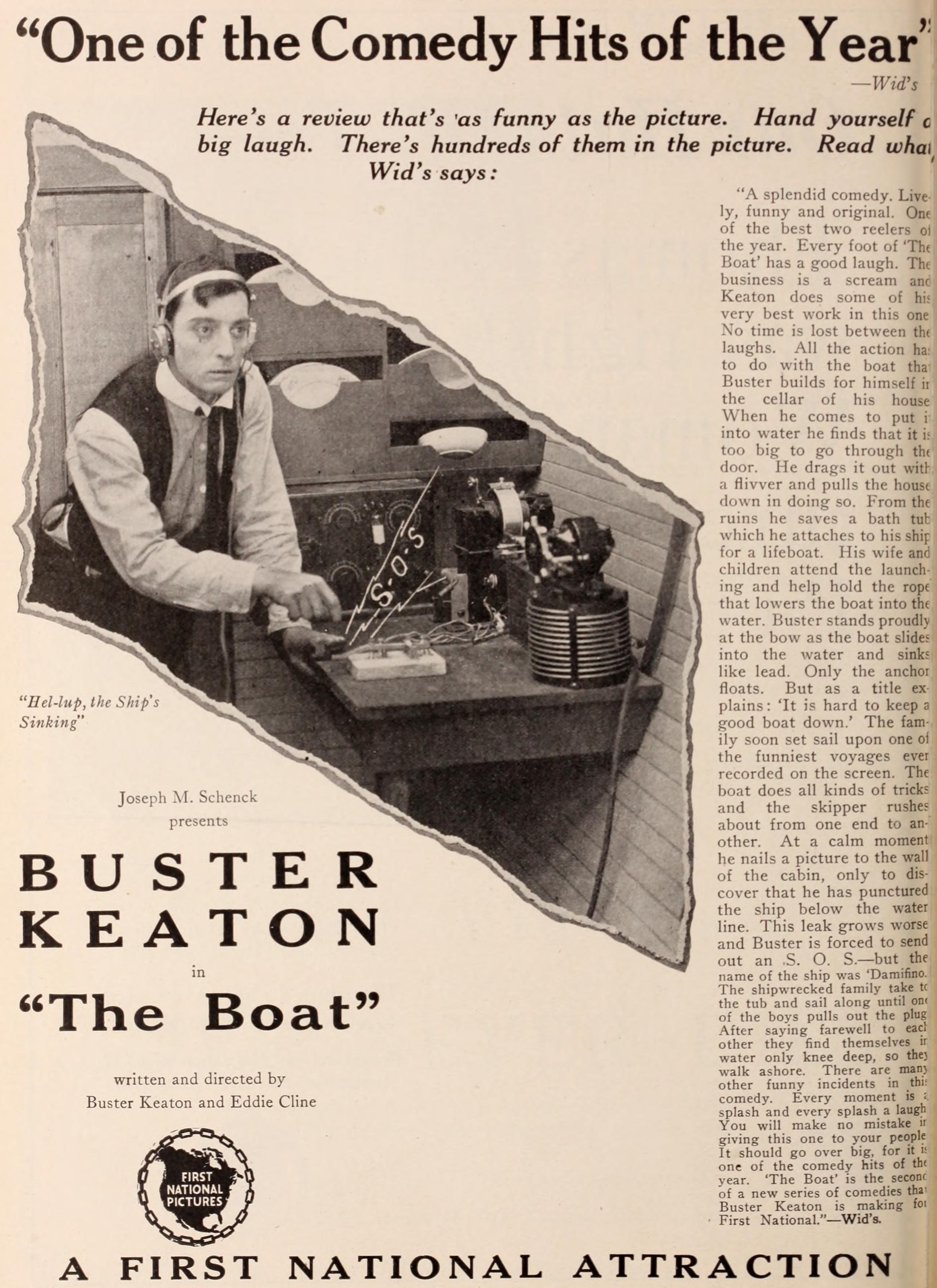
- Advertisement in Exhibitors Herald
- Directed by: Buster Keaton; Edward F. Cline
- Written by: Buster Keaton; Edward F. Cline
- Produced by: Joseph M. Schenck
- Starring: Buster Keaton; Sybil Seely
- Cinematography: Elgin Lessley
- Distributed by: First National Pictures
- Release date: November 10, 1921
- Running time: 23 minutes
- Country: United States
- Language: Silent (English intertitles)
- Box office: $156,124

The Boat

The Boat is a 1921 American two-reel silent comedy film written and directed by, and starring Buster Keaton. Contemporary reviews consider it one of his best shorts, along with One Week (1920), The Playhouse (1921) and Cops (1922). It is presently in the public domain. The International Buster Keaton Society takes its name, The Damfinos, from the name of the film's boat.

== Plot ==
Buster is married with two children (both of whom wear child-sized versions of the same pork pie hat). He has built a large boat he has christened Damfino inside his home. When he finishes and decides to take the boat out to sea, he realizes it is too large to fit through the door. He enlarges the opening a bit, but when he tows the boat out using a pulley line from his Model T car, the boat proves to be a bit bigger than he estimated, and the house completely collapses.

When he attempts to launch the boat, Buster loses the family car. The boat passes with impunity under the exceedingly low bridges of the Venice (California) canals thanks to Buster's clever boat design. Once they're out on the Pacific, Buster and his family are caught in a terrible storm. The boat is barely seaworthy to begin with, and it does not help that Buster nails a picture up inside the boat, causing an improbable leak; or when he further drills through the bottom of the boat to let the water out, resulting in a spectacular gusher. He radios a Morse Code call for help, but when the Coast Guard operator asks who it is, he answers, "d-a-m-f-i-n-o" in Morse Code. The operator interprets it as "damn if I know" and dismisses the call as a prank. Taking to a ridiculously small dinghy that is in fact a bathtub, the family resign themselves to sinking into the sea—until they realize they are actually standing in shallow water. After wading a short distance, they come up on a deserted beach in the dark of night. "Where are we?" asks his wife (via an intertitle), to which Buster replies, "Damn if I know" (mouthing the words to the camera; no intertitle is used).

== Cast ==
- Buster Keaton as The Boat Builder
- Edward F. Cline as SOS Receiver (uncredited)
- Sybil Seely as His Wife (uncredited)

== Themes ==
The Boat is a classic retelling of Keaton's favorite theme of Man Versus Machine. The accompanying themes of calamity and destruction pave the way for the "little man" to regain control of the situation.

Oldham notes that the boat's name, Damfino (or "damn if I know") reflects Keaton's own reaction to the perplexing and challenging world he confronts in his films. As the name is referenced numerous times throughout the film, Oldham also describes it as "probably the longest running single pun in the history of the silent film". In their book Buster Keaton and the Muskegon Connection, Okkonen and Pesch assert that Keaton picked up the name from a powerboat entry in an Actors' Colony regatta in Muskegon, Michigan. Keaton reused the name for a racing shell in his 1927 film College. Members of the International Buster Keaton Society informally call themselves The Damfinos.

== Production ==
=== Development ===
Neibur and Niemi consider The Boat the third installment in a trilogy of films about a young married couple, beginning with The Scarecrow (1920) and continuing with One Week (1920). They also note the parallelism between the ending of One Week, in which the couple's home is destroyed by a train, and the beginning of The Boat, in which their house is destroyed by the boat. Keaton considered combining One Week and The Boat into a single four-reeler that would follow the adventures of a young couple. To that end, Virginia Fox, who was originally cast as the wife in The Boat, was replaced with Sybil Seely, the wife in One Week. However, the idea of combining the films was never realized.

=== Filming and special effects ===
The boat launch, in which the vessel slides out of the launching ramp and sinks straight into the water, took three days to film. Technical director Fred Gabourie had two 35 ft (11 m) boats built for the production—one to float and one to sink. However, neither vessel performed its function. The production crew initially weighted the boat meant to sink with approximately 1,600 lb (730 kg) of pig iron and T-rails, but as the vessel slid off the ramp it slowed down instead of gliding underwater. Keaton later explained that an undercrank could not be used because it would make the surface of the water "jumpy". The crew next constructed a breakaway stern so the vessel would collapse upon hitting the water—but an air pocket in the nose of the boat kept the nose up out of the water. As a next strategy, the crew drilled holes all over the boat to ensure it would sink. But the buoyancy of the wood itself stopped it from sinking quickly. Finally, the crew towed the boat out to Balboa Bay off Newport Beach, California, and sank an anchor with a cable attached to a pulley mounted on the stern. At the other end, the cable was attached to a tugboat, which dragged the boat under the water to complete the gag.

Keaton and Gabourie also conceived the design of the boat's collapsible funnels, mast, and rigging which enable it to pass under bridges, in another inventive sight gag.

== Release ==
Metro Pictures released The Boat on November 10, 1921, including versions with the foreign titles La barca (Italy and Spain), Frigo capitaine au long cours (France), Acksónak (Hungary) and Buster merenkulkijana (Finland).

== Reception ==
The Boat was well-received by filmgoers. Keaton considered it one of his personal favorites. In his autobiography My Wonderful World of Slapstick, Keaton said that the signature image of his pork pie hat floating on the water at the end of the film instantly identified him and made audiences think he was "walking underwater just underneath it".

A 1921 review in The Washington Post called the film a classic, suggesting that Keaton must have consulted with the United States Navy to come up with "every possible mishap that can by any possibility befall a vessel plying the high seas".

== See also ==
- Buster Keaton filmography

== Sources ==
- Brownlow, Kevin (1968). The Parade's Gone By. Knopf. p. 485 – via Internet Archive.
- Gehring, Wes D. (2018). Buster Keaton in His Own Time: What the Responses of 1920s Critics Reveal. McFarland. ISBN 9781476633268.
- Keaton, Buster; Samuels, Charles (1960). My Wonderful World of Slapstick. Doubleday.
- Keaton, Eleanor; Vance, Jeffrey (2001). Buster Keaton Remembered. Harry N. Abrams Inc. p. 84. ISBN 9780810942271.
- McPherson, Edward (2011). Buster Keaton: Tempest in a Flat Hat. Faber & Faber. ISBN 9780571278800.
- Neibaur, James L.; Niemi, Terri (2013). Buster Keaton's Silent Shorts, 1920-1923. Rowman & Littlefield. ISBN 9780810887404.
- Oldham, Gabriella (2010). Keaton's Silent Shorts: Beyond the Laughter (Revised ed.). SIU Press. ISBN 9780809385942.
