= International Buster Keaton Society =

Educational organization

The International Buster Keaton Society Inc.— a.k.a. "The Damfinos"—is the official educational organization dedicated to comedy film producer-director-writer-actor-stuntman Buster Keaton.

== Mission ==
According to the Damfinos, their mission is "to foster and perpetuate appreciation and understanding of the life, career and films of comedian/filmmaker Buster Keaton; to advocate for historical accuracy about Keaton's life and work; to encourage dissemination of information about Keaton; to endorse preservation and restoration of Keaton's films and performances; and to do all of the above with a sense of humor that includes an ongoing awareness of the surreal and absurd joy with which Keaton made his films."

== Statement of Purpose ==
The International Buster Keaton Society Inc. (also known as “The Damfinos”) is a 501(c)(3) nonprofit organization dedicated to educating the world about comedian and filmmaker Buster Keaton.

== Activities ==
Among other projects, the Damfinos publish a tri-annual digital magazine, The Keaton Chronicle, a print annual, The Great Stone Face and host an annual convention in Muskegon, Michigan, the weekend closest to Buster Keaton's birthday on October 4. The Damfinos also sponsor the Buster Award, for extraordinary individuals for their work done in the spirit of Buster Keaton. One of the Damfinos' ongoing projects is the awarding of the annual Porkpie Scholar Grant.

On June 16, 2018, the International Buster Keaton Society laid a four foot square plaque in honor of both Keaton and Charles Chaplin on the corner of the shared block (1021 Lillian Ave) where each had made many of their silent comedies in Hollywood. In the honor of the event, the City of Los Angeles declared the date "Buster Keaton Day."

"Talking Buster Keaton," a podcast devoted to Buster Keaton, hosted by Alek Lev and Jeremy Guskin, is closely associated with the "Damfinos."

== History and background ==
Patricia Eliot Tobias, Melody Bunting and Wendy Merckel co–founded The International Buster Keaton Society on October 4, 1992 – Buster's birthday. Dedicated to bringing greater public attention to Keaton's life and work, the membership includes many individuals from the world of entertainment and the arts: actors, producers, authors, artists, graphic novelists, musicians, and designers, as well as those who simply admire the magic of Buster Keaton. The Society's nickname, the “Damfinos,” is named after the boats in two of Keaton films: the 1921 comedy The Boat, and the 1927 feature film College.

The Damfinos have been profiled periodically in media outlets, such as the Seven Chances (1925) "Bridal Run"—where Keaton is chased by a mob of angry brides was recreated in the streets of Muskegon—in 2010, Michigan Live in 2011, and The Muskegon Tribune in 2013. The Damfinos are listed online at Turner Classic Movies.

The group has also been referenced in several Keaton related books, including Imogen Sara Smith's "Buster Keaton: The Persistence of Comedy," Kevin W. Sweeney's "Buster Keaton: Interviews," Edward McPherson's "Buster Keaton: Tempest in a Flat Hat," "The Fall of Buster Keaton: His Films for MGM, Educational Pictures, and Columbia" by James L. Neibaur and "Silent Echoes: discovering early Hollywood through the films of Buster Keaton" by John Bengtson.

The current president of the International Buster Keaton Society is Eryn Leedale Merwart. Past presidents include Patricia Eliot Tobias (twice), Susan Buhrman, and Bob Borgen. Buster's Keaton's granddaughter, Melissa Talmadge-Cox, is a member of the group's board of directors.

The Damfinos' convention is held annually in Muskegon, Michigan.

The group has also led a campaign to save Buster's childhood baseball field in Muskegon, Michigan.
