= Sybil Seely =

American actress

- Seely c. 1920
- Born: Sibye Travilla; January 2, 1902; Los Angeles, California, U.S.
- Died: June 26, 1984 (aged 82); Culver City, California, U.S.
- Occupation: Actress
- Years active: 1917–1922
- Spouse: Jules Furthman (m. 1920; died 1966)
- Children: 1

Sybil Seely (born Sibye Travilla, January 2, 1902 – June 26, 1984) was a silent film actress who worked with the well known silent film comedy actor Buster Keaton.

== Early years ==
Seely was born to Harry Travilla and Lucie Ellen Boyker in Los Angeles, the sixth of seven children. She was of French, English, and Scottish descent. Her three brothers performed "as the Travilla Brothers, a popular vaudeville act featuring stunts in a huge onstage tank using a trained seal named Winks, advertised as 'The Seal With The Human Brain.'"

== Career ==
Seely is known to have appeared in 23 films, and her first role, according to IMDb, was an uncredited part in Her Nature Dance (1917), at the age of 15. This picture was made for the Mack Sennett studio, where she began as a "Bathing Beauty", and where she was under contract for her entire career. Sennett loaned her to Buster Keaton for four short films, including her first role with the great silent screen comedian as his bride and fellow ill-fated house-kit-builder in One Week (1920). This is the role for which Seely is best known, and her unflappable screen personality, as well as the ability to keep up with Keaton and perform her own stunts, earned her the roles in the three other Keaton two-reelers.

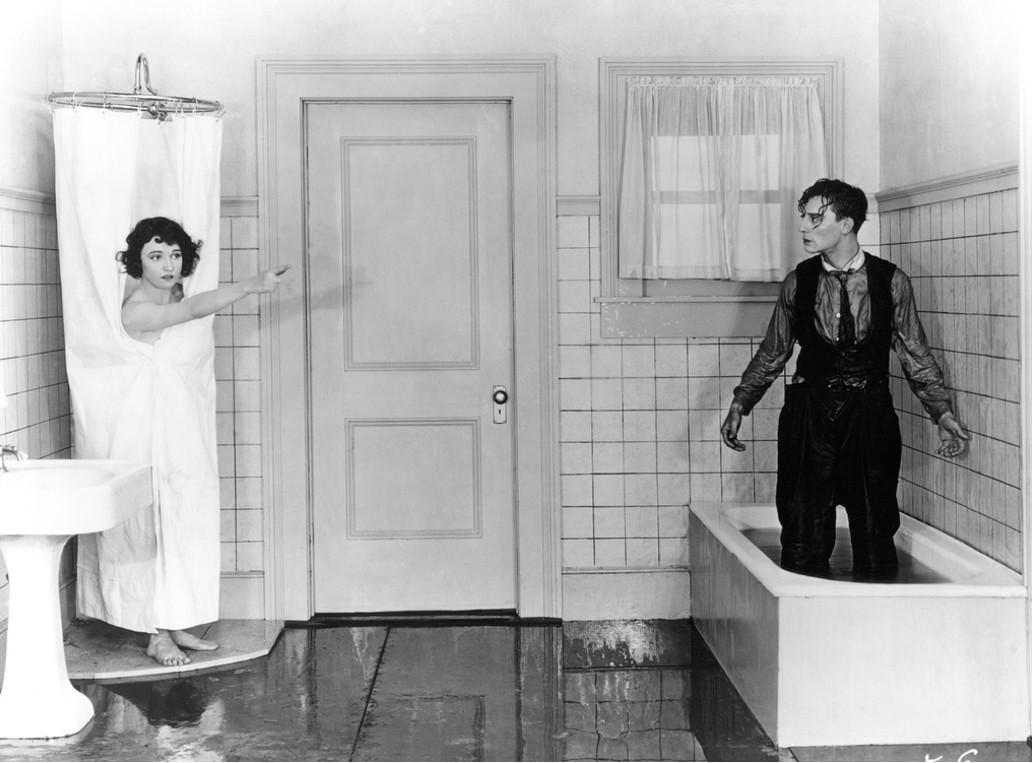
Still from Buster Keaton's "One Week" with Keaton and co-star Sybil Seely

== Personal life ==
In 1920, she married screenwriter Jules Furthman. They had a son, Jules Jr. In 1922, she retired from her acting career.

== Death ==
Seely was diagnosed with colon cancer in 1983 and also suffered from cerebral arteriosclerosis at the time of her death from cardiac failure in Culver City, California, aged 82, on June 26, 1984.

== Filmography ==
- Hearts and Flowers (1919)
- A Lady's Tailor (1919)
- Salome vs. Shenandoah (1919)
- Up in Alf's Place (1919)
- His Last False Step (1919)
- Down on the Farm (1920)
- By Golly! (1920)
- Married Life (1920)
- One Week (1920)
- Convict 13 (1920)
- Movie Fans (1920)
- Love, Honor and Behave (1920)
- The Scarecrow (1920) (uncredited)
- Bungalow Troubles (1920)
- The Boat (1921)
- A Sailor-Made Man (1921)
- On Patrol (1922)
