= Spring Fever (novel) =

1948 novel by P. G. Wodehouse

- First edition (UK)
- Author: P. G. Wodehouse
- Language: English
- Genre: Comic novel
- Publisher: Herbert Jenkins (UK); Doubleday and Co (US)
- Publication date: 20 May 1948
- Publication place: United Kingdom
- Media type: Print (Hardcover)

Spring Fever is a novel by P. G. Wodehouse, first published on 20 May 1948, in the United Kingdom by Herbert Jenkins, London, and on the same date in the United States by Doubleday and Co, New York. Although not featuring any of Wodehouse's regular characters, the cast contains a typical Wodehousian selection of English aristocrats, Stoker family relations, wealthy Americans, household staff and imposters.

== Plot summary ==
Wealthy New York businessman G. Ellery Cobbold has sent his son Stanwood, a blundering ex-American football player, to London, to separate him from Hollywood starlet Eileen Stoker with whom he is in love. When Cobbold discovers that Stoker is also in London, making pictures, he insists that Stanwood goes to stay with a distant relation, curmudgeonly widower Lord Shortlands. But Stanwood stays put. Instead, good-looking movie agent Mike Cardinal goes to Shortlands' castle (Beevor, in Kent), posing as Stanwood. He is pursuing Shortlands' beautiful daughter Terry. But Terry is wary of him because he is too handsome.

Lord Shortlands himself is in love with his cook, Mrs Punter, and would like to marry her. Unfortunately she insists on £200 to buy a pub, which Shortlands doesn't have, the purse-strings at Beevor Castle being firmly in the control of his domineering elder daughter Adela. Also, he has a rival in suave butler Mervyn Spink. Things look up for "Shorty" when he discovers that a stamp in his collection is worth £1000. But Spink fools Adela into believing that the stamp is his, and it gets locked up in a safe. It so happens that Stanwood's butler, Augustus Robb is an ex-safe breaker, and Mike masterminds a burglary. This goes disastrously wrong, and Mike gets hit in the face with a bag of safe breaking tools. The up-side is that his battered face makes him suddenly attractive to Terry. So, after a final misunderstanding, things end happily for Mike and Terry. Stanwood and Eileen also get together. But Mrs Punter runs off with Augustus Robb, leaving Shorty and Spink ruing their loss in love but bound in their increased fortunes; Spink is a big winner in a horse race and Shorty has been invited to live with Mike and Terry in Hollywood, away from Adela, where the savvy Mike has assured him he can make a handsome income by appearing in movies as a character actor of butlers.

== Background ==
According to Wodehouse scholar Norman Murphy, the novel's Beevor Castle closely resembles a real castle, Hever Castle. Hever Castle is not far from Fairlawne, where Wodehouse's daughter Leonora lived after she married.

== Publication history ==
The illustration on the first US edition dust jacket was by Paul Galdone, and the photograph of Wodehouse on the back was by Ray Platnick. The illustration on the first UK edition dust jacket was by Frank Ford.

According to Richard Usborne's book Wodehouse at Work to the End, Wodehouse adapted Spring Fever into a play for Edward Everett Horton with an American setting and characters. Horton was unable to use the play because of other commitments, so Wodehouse turned the play into a new novel, The Old Reliable (1951).

The story was published in one issue of the Toronto Star Weekly, on 9 October 1948.

Spring Fever was included in the book Five Complete Novels, a collection of Wodehouse novels published on 15 May 1983 by Avenel Books, New York. The book also included The Return of Jeeves, Bertie Wooster Sees It Through, The Butler Did It, and The Old Reliable.
