= Straight Faced =

American rock band

- Origin: Huntington Beach, California, U.S.
- Genres: Hardcore punk, punk rock, post-hardcore, alternative metal
- Years active: 1992–2001
- Labels: Epitaph Records; Fearless Records; Victory Records; Lethal Records
- Past members: Johnny Miller; Ron Moeller; David Tonic; Jeff Hibben; Damon Beard; Kevin Norton; Samuel Marrs; Kevin Grossman; Eric Stewart

Straight Faced was an American rock band formed in Huntington Beach, California, United States, in 1992.

== Origin ==
Straight Faced began as a Huntington Beach, California hardcore band named "Above All" in 1991. The founding members were Eric Glenn Stewart (1973–2007), Ron Moeller, Matthew Polentz, and Samuel Marrs. All members were friends who grew up together in Huntington Beach, California in the late 1980s. Stewart set them up in a warehouse in Santa Ana that his father used to run a construction business out of, and taught the other members how to play. With a handful of originals and cover songs, they played one backyard party. Shortly after the addition of Kevin Grossman as second guitar, Above All broke up due to a rift that split the band in two. At the request of Ron Moeller for his birthday, he and Grossman rented a rehearsal studio and recruited their new friend Johnny Miller to sing. The bass player for that night never showed up so they asked Jack C. Louis to fill in at the last minute. Within a few months, Eric Stewart joined the newly formed group. One week before their first show they brought Marrs in to replace Louis on bass.

== Early years ==
Grossman dubbed the reconstituted group Straight Faced. The group played its first shows in early 1993 and quickly released Self Will Run Riot, a five song 7", after being approached by Bob Becker of Fearless Records at their second show. At this time, Stewart was asked to leave the band. He was replaced soon after by Damon Beard, who had been playing with Polentz and Louis in Adverse Reality. Straight Faced recorded their first full length, Guilty, and released it with Lethal Records, but due to the lack of a signed contract, quickly took the recording to Bob Becker to release on Fearless. They returned to the studio to record Broken in 1996 before setting off on their first European tour, a 7-week stint opening for their friends, Ignite.

== Epitaph Years ==
After Grossman and Marrs’ departure in 1997, the group enlisted David Tonic and Kevin Norton and signed with Epitaph Records to release Conditioned, their third LP. Following this, Kevin Norton left the group. Damon Beard filled in on bass until also deciding to leave the band a short time later. Beard was then ultimately replaced by Jeff Hibben. A fourth full-length, Pulling Teeth, was released on Epitaph in 2000 before the group disbanded some time thereafter. The album was described by AllMusic as "very much a product of the alternative metal scene of 2000 -- and it's an exciting one at that."

== Members ==
- Johnny Miller - vocals (1992-2001)
- Ron Moeller - drums (1992-2001)
- David Tonic - guitar (1997-2001)
- Jeff Hibben - bass (1998-2001)
- Damon Beard - guitar (1994-1998)
- Kevin Norton - bass (1997-1998)
- Samuel Marrs - bass (1992-1997)
- Kevin Grossman - guitar (1992-1997)
- Eric Stewart - guitar (1992-1994)
- Jack Louis - bass (1992)

== Discography ==
- Self Will Run Riot 7" (Fearless Records, 1992)
- Guilty (Original release on Lethal Records, 1994)
- Guilty (Fearless Records, 1995)
- Broken (Fearless Records, 1996)
- Revolve 7" (Hostage Records, 1998)
- Conditioned (Epitaph Records, 1998)
- Confidence 7" (Victory Records, 1998)
- Pulling Teeth (Epitaph Records, 2000)
