= Broken (Straight Faced album) =

Studio album by Straight Faced
- Released: October 30, 1996
- Recorded: Paramount Recording Studios, Hollywood, California, USA
- Genre: Hardcore punk
- Length: 35:59
- Label: Fearless Records
- Producer: Jim Cherry

Straight Faced chronology
Guilty (1995)	Broken (1996)	Conditioned (1998)

Professional ratings
Review scores
Source	Rating
Allmusic	2.5/5 stars

Broken is the second full-length studio album from hardcore punk band Straight Faced. It was released in July, 1996 on Fearless Records and follows Guilty released in 1995. The album was produced by Strung Out bassist Jim Cherry.

== Track listing ==
No.	Title	Length
1.	"Convictions"	1:49
2.	"Negative"	2:35
3.	"Gone Too Far"	2:00
4.	"Change"	2:07
5.	"No Ambition"	2:13
6.	"Insecure"	2:06
7.	"Who Am I Too Say"	1:59
8.	"Apology"	3:21
9.	"Potential Genius"	2:18
10.	"A Week Ago Today"	2:58
11.	"Broken"	1:57
12.	"Lit"	2:41
13.	"Show Me Your Gun"	1:51
14.	"Wrong"	2:12
Total length:		35:59

== Personnel ==
Straight Faced

- Johnny Miller – vocals
- Kevin Grossman – guitar
- Damon Beard – guitar
- Sam Marrs – bass
- Ron Moeller – drums

Production

- Recorded at Paramount Recording Studios, Hollywood, California, USA
- Produced by Jim Cherry
- Mixed by Ryan Greene at Fat Planet
- Mastered by Eddie Schreyer
