= Sweedie =

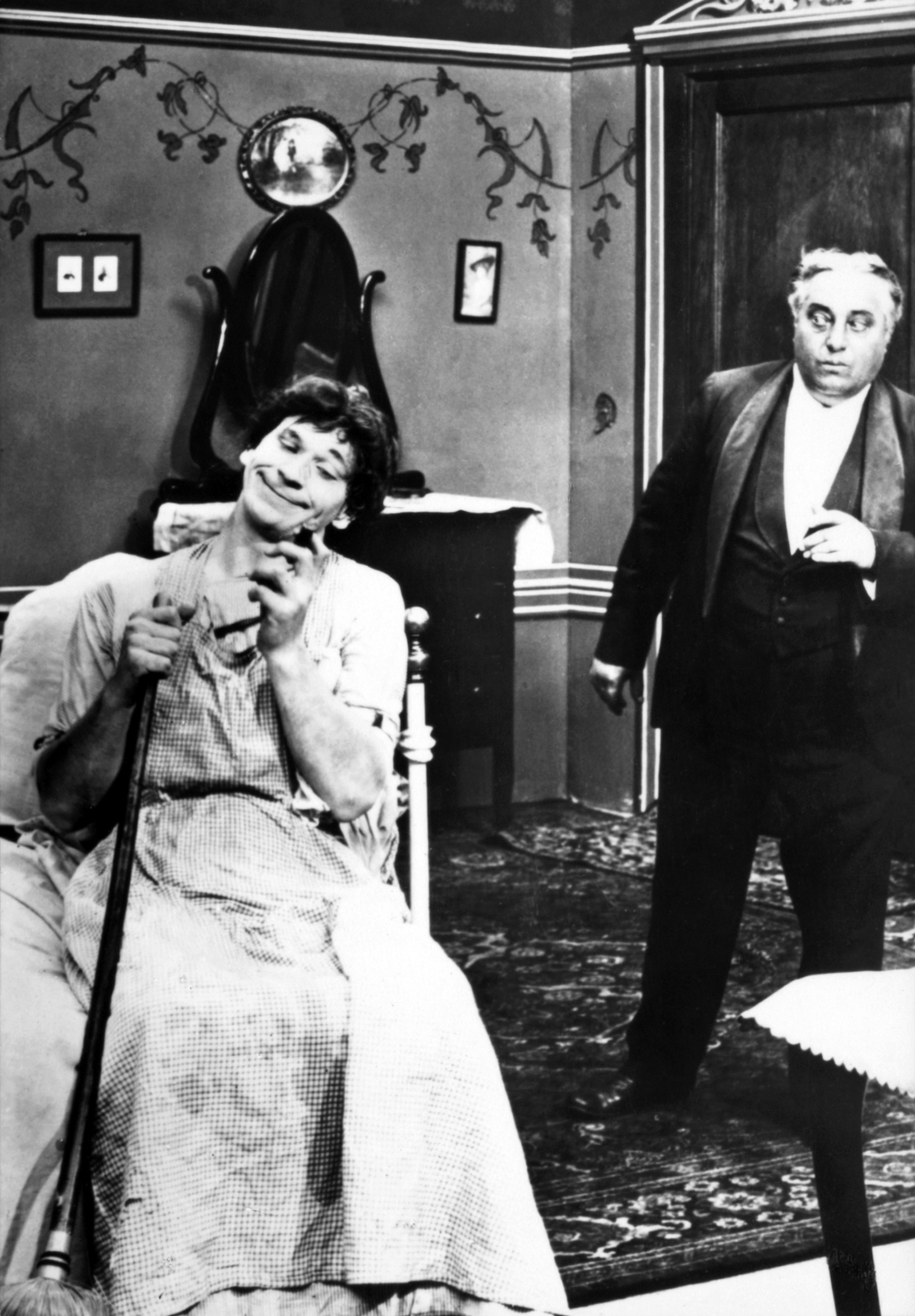
Actor Wallace Beery (left) portrayed Sweedie the Swedish maid in a 1914–16 series of short comedy films

Sweedie (also known as My Sweedie, The Swedish Maid}) is a fictional character portrayed by actor Wallace Beery in drag in a series of comedy films from 1914 to 1916. The series is notable as the means by which Beery, a particularly masculine actor (which is the series' joke), first made his name in the film industry.

== List of Sweedie films ==
- Sweedie the Swatter (July 13, 1914)
- Sweedie and the Lord (1914)
- Topsy-Turvy Sweedie (1914)
- Sweedie and the Double Exposure (1914)
- Sweedie Springs a Surprise (1914)
- Sweedie's Skate (1914)
- Sweedie's Clean-Up (1914)
- Golf Champion 'Chick' Evans Links with Sweedie (1914)
- The Fickleness of Sweedie (1914)
- Sweedie Learns to Swim (1914)
- She Landed a Big One (aka She Landed a Lord) (1914)
- Sweedie the Laundress (1914)
- Sweedie the Trouble Maker (1914)
- Countess Sweedie (1914)
- Sweedie at the Fair (1914)
- A Maid of War (1914)
- Sweedie and the Hypnotist (1914)
- Sweedie Collects for Charity (1914)
- Sweedie and the Sultan's Present (1915)
- Sweedie's Suicide (1915)
- Sweedie and Her Dog (1915)
- The New Teacher (1915)
- Sweedie Goes to College (1915)
- Sweedie's Hopeless Love (1915)
- Sweedie Learns to Ride (1915)
- Sweedie in Vaudeville (1915)
- Sweedie's Hero (1915)
- Sweedie's Finish (1915)
- Sweedie, the Janitor (1916)

== See also ==
- Cross-gender acting
