= Two Hearts That Beat as Ten =

1915 short film

Two Hearts That Beat as Ten is a 1915 short film starring Ben Turpin and Wallace Beery, produced by the Essanay Film Manufacturing Company, and distributed by the General Film Company. The supporting cast features Robert Bolder and Charlotte Mineau. The writer and director of the film currently remain unknown.

== Cast ==
Wallace Beery ... Fred
Robert Bolder ... Archie
Betty Brown ... Mildred
Charlotte Mineau ... The Nurse
Ben Turpin
