= Love, Honor and Behave (1920 film) =

1920 film

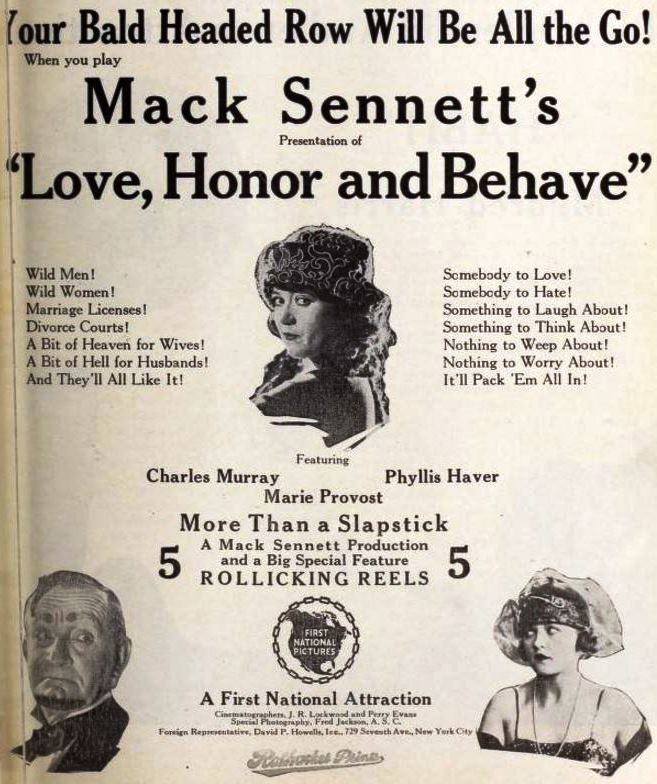
- Directed by: F. Richard Jones; Erle C. Kenton
- Written by: Mack Sennett
- Produced by: Mack Sennett
- Starring: Ford Sterling; Phyllis Haver; Marie Prevost
- Cinematography: Perry Evans; Fred Jackman; J.R. Lockwood
- Edited by: Allen McNeil
- Production company: Mack Sennett Comedies
- Distributed by: First National Pictures
- Release date: November 22, 1920
- Running time: 50 minutes
- Country: United States
- Languages: Silent; English intertitles

Love, Honor and Behave is a 1920 American silent comedy film directed by F. Richard Jones and Erle C. Kenton and starring Ford Sterling, Phyllis Haver and Marie Prevost.

== Cast ==
- Charles Murray as His Honor - Judge Fawcett
- Ford Sterling as Milton Robbin - Haberdasher
- Phyllis Haver as Mrs. Milton Robbin
- Marie Prevost as Newlywed Bride
- George O'Hara as Newlywed Groom
- Charlotte Mineau as A Merry Widow
- Billy Bevan as A Fake Lawyer
- Kalla Pasha as The Lawyer's Right-Hand Man
- Eddie Gribbon as The Lawyer's Left-Hand Man
- Fanny Kelly as Mrs. Fawcett - the Judge's Wife
- Billy Armstrong as The District Attorney / Maitre d'
- Joseph Belmon as Robbins' Brother-in-Law
- Raymond Griffith as Man with Married Girlfriend
- Sybil Seely as Married Girlfriend
- James Finlayson as Artist
- Dave Anderson as Jealous Husband

== Bibliography ==
- Brent E. Walker. Mack Sennett’s Fun Factory: A History and Filmography of His Studio and His Keystone and Mack Sennett Comedies, with Biographies of Players and Personnel. McFarland, 2013.
