= Sweedie Goes to College =

1915 film

- Directed by: Richard Foster Baker
- Starring: Wallace Beery
- Distributed by: Essanay Studios
- Release date: February 8, 1915
- Country: United States
- Languages: Silent; English intertitles

Sweedie Goes to College is a 1915 silent comedy film directed by Richard Foster Baker and featuring Gloria Swanson.

== Cast ==
- Wallace Beery - Sweedie
- Ben Turpin - Sweedie's Romeo
- Charlotte Mineau - Mrs. Knowledge - the Matron
- Gloria Swanson - College Girl

== See also ==
- Sweedie, series of films starring Wally Beery
