= Conditioned (album) =

Studio album by Straight Faced
- Released: July 28, 1998
- Recorded: Motor Studios, San Francisco, California, USA
- Genre: Hardcore punk
- Length: 34:09
- Label: Epitaph Records
- Producer: Ryan Greene

Straight Faced chronology
Broken (1996)	Conditioned (1998)	Pulling Teeth (2000)

Professional ratings
Review scores
Source	Rating
Allmusic	2.5/5 stars

Conditioned is the third full-length studio album from hardcore punk band Straight Faced. It was released in July 1998 on Epitaph Records and follows Broken, released in 1996. The album was produced by Ryan Greene, and the track "Let's Do This" appeared on Epitaph Records' Punk-O-Rama Vol. 4 compilation. An alternative version of the track "Regret" appeared on Fearless Records' Flush Sampler, and "Against" was featured in the Electronic Arts' PlayStation game Street Sk8er.

== Track listing ==
No.	Title	Length
1.	"Conditioned"	2:47
2.	"Pedestal"	1:56
3.	"Against"	3:00
4.	"Revolve"	2:21
5.	"How Would I Know"	2:34
6.	"Course for Destruction"	1:40
7.	"Rumor Mill"	2:32
8.	"Dr. Heckle"	2:10
9.	"Let Down"	2:18
10.	"Waste of Time"	2:24
11.	"Let's Do This"	1:22
12.	"Greed Motivates"	1:43
13.	"Brought This On"	2:02
14.	"Regret"	2:12
15.	"You Wouldn't Understand"	3:08
Total length:		34:09

== Personnel ==
Straight Faced

- Johnny Miller – vocals
- David Tonic – guitar
- Damon Beard – guitar
- Kevin Norton – bass
- Ron Moeller – drums

Production

- Recorded at Motor Studios, San Francisco, California, USA
- Produced by Ryan Greene
- Mastered by Ramon Breton
