= One Week (1920 film) =

1920 American two-reel silent comedy film

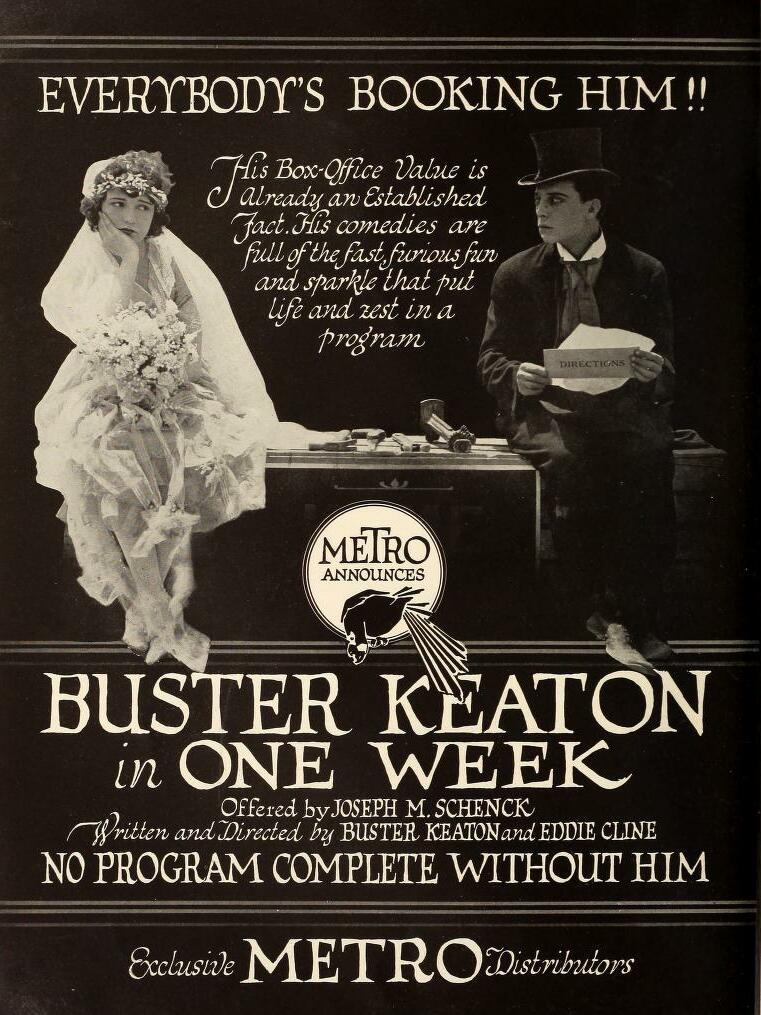
- October 1920 advertisement in Motion Picture News
- Directed by: Buster Keaton; Edward F. Cline
- Written by: Edward F. Cline; Buster Keaton
- Produced by: Joseph M. Schenck
- Starring: Buster Keaton; Sybil Seely; Joe Roberts
- Cinematography: Elgin Lessley
- Edited by: Buster Keaton
- Distributed by: Metro Pictures
- Release date: September 1, 1920
- Running time: 19 minutes
- Country: United States
- Languages: Silent film English intertitles

One Week is a 1920 American two-reel silent comedy film starring Buster Keaton, the first independent film production he released on his own. The film was written and directed by Keaton and Edward F. Cline, and runs for 19 minutes. Sybil Seely co-stars. The film contains a large number of innovative visual gags largely pertaining to either the house or to ladders.

In 2008, One Week was selected for preservation in the United States National Film Registry by the Library of Congress as being "culturally, historically, or aesthetically significant".

== Plot ==
Full short of One Week

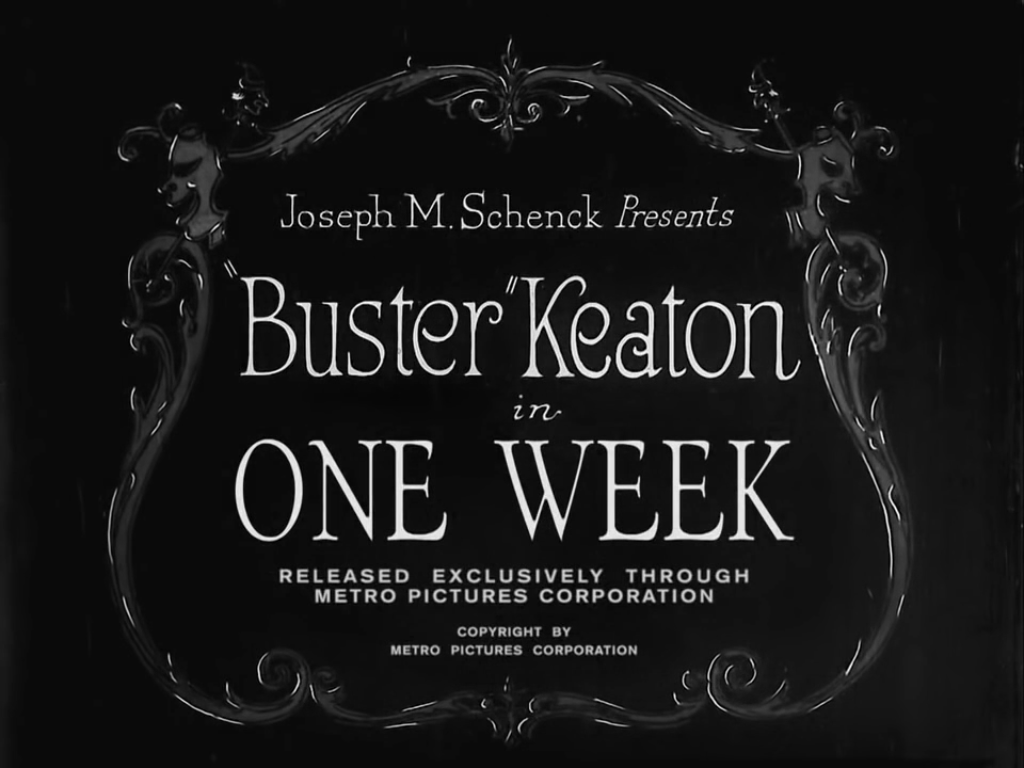
Buster Keaton One Week title card

The story involves a newlywed couple who receive a kit house as a wedding gift. The instructions describe how to construct the house by assembling materials in numbered packing crates. A rejected suitor secretly renumbers packing crates, and the result is a lopsided structure with revolving walls, kitchen fixtures on the exterior, and upper-floor doors that open onto thin air. During a housewarming party on Friday the 13th, a storm spins the house and its occupants around like a merry-go-round.

The couple find they have built the house on the wrong lot and must move it. They manage to move it on rollers but it stalls on railroad tracks. The couple try to move it out the way of an oncoming train, which eventually passes on the neighboring track. As the couple look relieved, the house is immediately struck and demolished by another train coming the other way. The groom stares at the scene, places a 'For Sale' sign with the heap (attaching the building instructions) and walks off with his bride.

== Cast ==
- Buster Keaton as the groom
- Sybil Seely as the bride
- Joe Roberts as piano mover

== Production ==
=== Development ===
One Week was likely inspired by Home Made, an educational short film produced by the Ford Motor Company in 1919 to promote prefabricated housing. Keaton used numerous elements seen in the film, including "the wedding, the Model T and the use of the pages from a daily calendar to show the house being built in one week" in his comic parody. Years later, Keaton told an interviewer that the film's title is a play on Three Weeks, a notorious 1907 sex novel by Elinor Glyn. Keaton reportedly joked that it was "one-third as scandalous".

Knopf notes that One Week is Keaton's first attempt to move away from a plot-driven narrative, as he employed in his earlier film The High Sign, toward mining more and more gags from a few basic elements—in this case, the house and ladders. According to Kevin Brownlow, One Week "set the style for all the future Keatons; the opening gag sequence ... the slow build-up ... the frenetic climax ... and then that climax outmatched by the final sequence". Furthermore, the film lay the basis for the cinematic techniques of his future films: "The simple setups, the flat comedy lighting, the spare use of titles—and the overall excellence of the direction".

According to Eleanor Keaton, Buster originally thought to combine two of his two-reel films, One Week and The Boat (1921), into a four-reeler charting a young couple's adventures. Virginia Fox, who had been hired for the latter film, was replaced with Sybil Seely who had starred in One Week. However, the idea of combining the films never came to fruition.

=== Casting ===
Sybil Seely plays the young bride in her film debut. The mischievous rival ("Handy Hank") is an unknown actor. Joe Roberts has a brief bit as a strong-man piano mover.

=== Filming and special effects ===
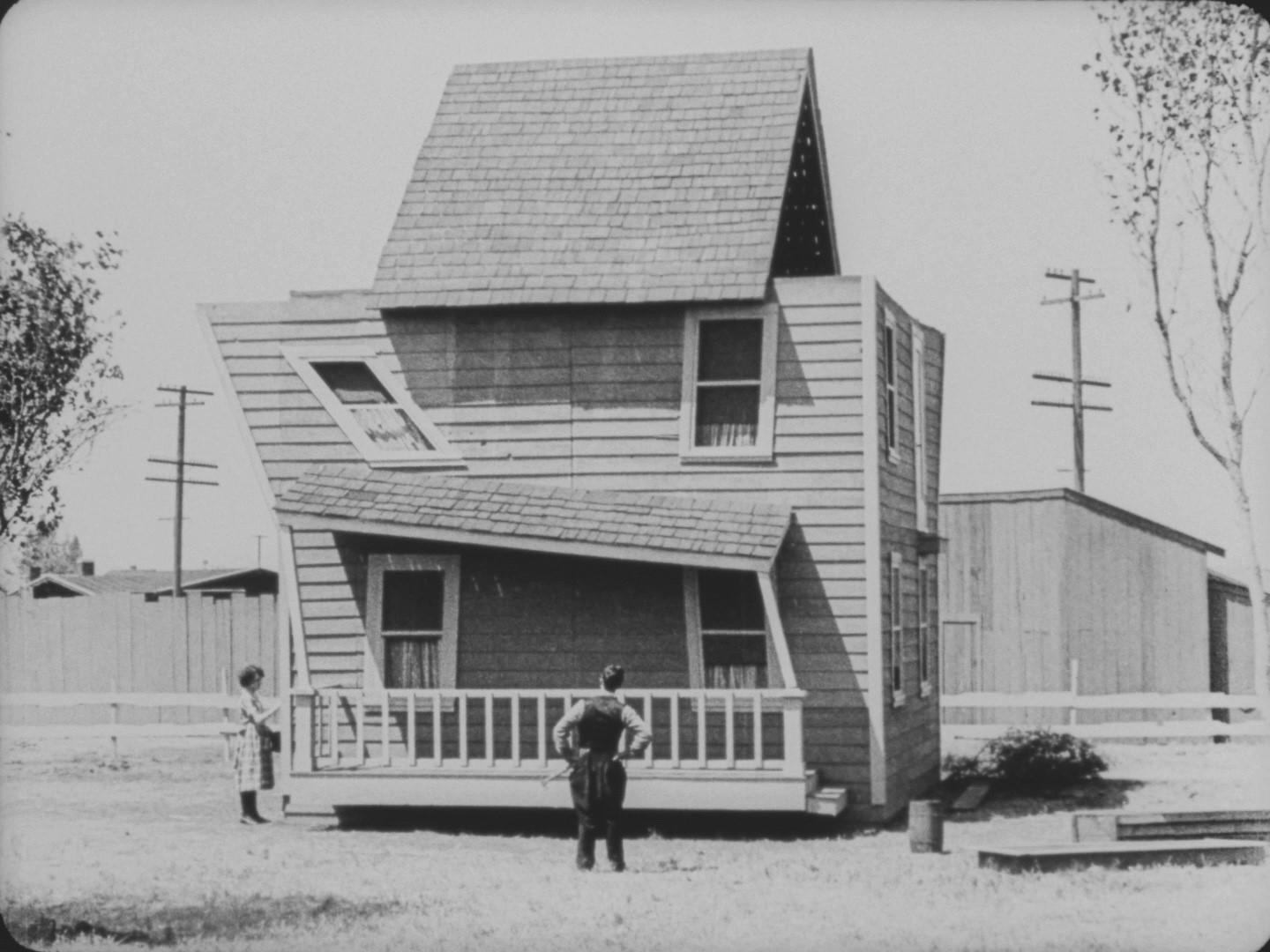
Keaton admires his build-it-yourself house

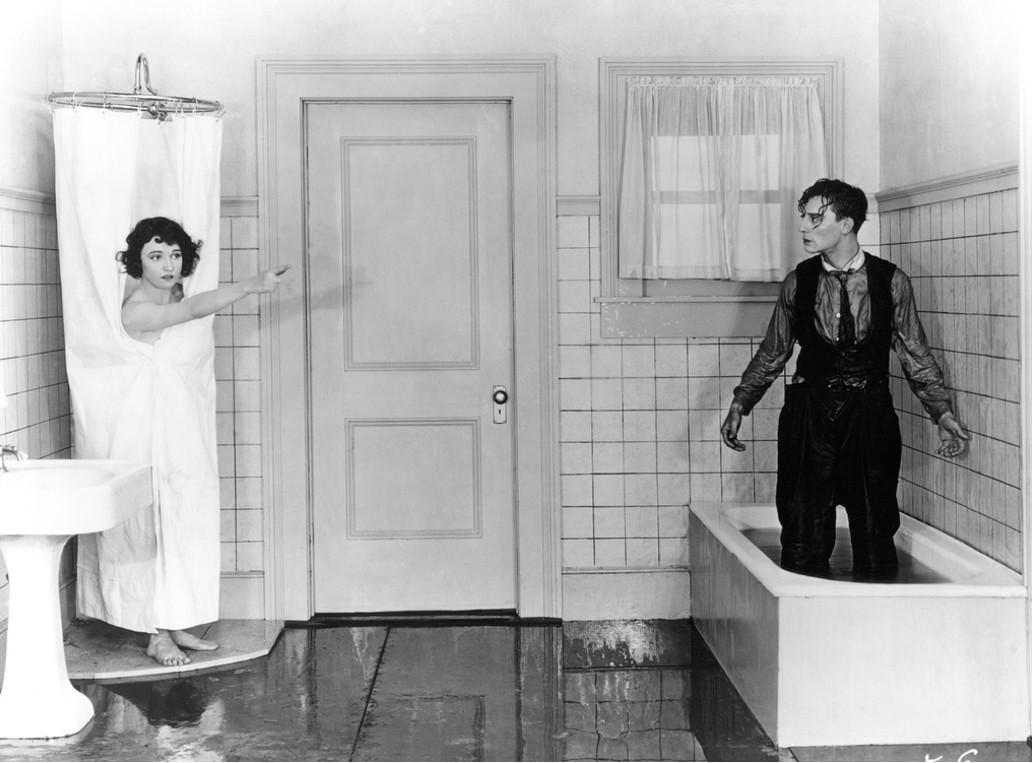
Sybil Seely showers and Buster Keaton bathes

Many special effects, such as the house spinning around during a storm and the train collision, were filmed as they occurred and were not model work. The house was constructed on a turntable so that it could spin around during the storm scene. The train collision was filmed at the Inglewood train station.

Keaton reused the gag of the side of a building falling on him, but emerging unscathed in the opening of a window in the wall, from the Fatty Arbuckle–Keaton film Back Stage; he would reuse the same joke in The Blacksmith (1922) and Steamboat Bill, Jr. (1928).

Keaton's fall down two stories after stepping out of the bathroom was one of the few times he injured himself badly. His arms and back swelled up a few hours after the filming. His physical trainer gave him both hot and cold showers and then treated the swelling with olive oil and horse liniment.

The film is noted for a risqué (for its time) scene involving Seely's character taking a bath. She drops a bar of soap out of the tub and waits until (as a fourth wall-breaking gag) someone's hand is placed over the camera lens so she can lean out and retrieve it. Although intended as a joke, the scene has appeared in a number of documentaries as an example of pre-Hays Code censorship.

== Release ==
One Week was released on September 1, 1920. It is noted as the first of Keaton's independent releases, although he had filmed The High Sign earlier. Keaton considered the latter film an inferior effort to debut with, and released it the following year when he was convalescing from an injury.

One Week was one of the top-grossing releases of 1920.

== Reception ==
The New York Times review said: "One Week, a Buster Keaton work, has more fun in it than most slap-stick, trick-property comedies". The Muncie Evening Press wrote: "Buster Keaton's 'One Week' is one of the funniest pictures ever made and plants Buster firmly on his feet as star". The Santa Clarita Valley Signal wrote: "If Buster Keaton in 'One Week' broke loose in a museum he'd tickle the mummies to life again. You never knew such fast and furious fun as this clever comedian provokes in his seven-day wonder". The Akron Evening Times agrees: "It is two reels in length and every foot of the two reels is packed with comedy situations and 'gags' that would start cackles at an undertaker's convention". The Los Angeles Evening Express wrote, "Buster Keaton's 'One Week' stands in a comedy class by itself". By early 1921, the film was being termed "one of the famous Buster Keaton comedies".

More than half a century later, New York Times theater and film critic Walter Kerr wrote in his 1975 book The Silent Clowns, "To sit through dozens and dozens of short comedies of the period and then to come upon One Week is to see the one thing no man ever sees: a garden at the moment of blooming."

== Other uses ==
Some of the themes of One Week were reused in The Three Stooges' short film The Sitter Downers (1937).

Guitarist Bill Frisell released a soundtrack to the film in 1995 on his album The High Sign/One Week.

== See also ==
- Buster Keaton filmography

== Sources ==
- Brownlow, Kevin (1968). The Parade's Gone By. Knopf. p. 485 – via Internet Archive.
- Keaton, Eleanor; Vance, Jeffrey (2001). Buster Keaton Remembered. Harry N. Abrams Inc. ISBN 9780810942271.
- Knopf, Robert (1999). The Theater and Cinema of Buster Keaton. Princeton University Press. ISBN 978-0-691-00442-6.
- Meade, Marion (2014). Buster Keaton: Cut to the Chase: A Biography. Open Road Media. ISBN 9781497602311.
- Neibaur, James L.; Niemi, Terri (2013). Buster Keaton's Silent Shorts: 1920-1923. Scarecrow Press. ISBN 9780810887411.
