= Pulling Teeth (album) =

Studio album by Straight Faced
- Released: October 10, 2000
- Recorded: Grandmaster, Hollywood, California, USA
- Genres: Hardcore punk Alternative metal
- Length: 33:19
- Label: Epitaph
- Producers: Blag Dahlia, Bradley Cook

Straight Faced chronology
Conditioned (1998)	Pulling Teeth (2000)

Pulling Teeth is the fourth full-length studio album by the hardcore punk band Straight Faced. It was released in 2000 on Epitaph Records. The album was produced by Blag Dahlia of Dwarves. The track "Happy" appeared on Epitaph Records' Punk-O-Rama Vol. 5.

== Critical reception ==
Professional ratings
Review scores
Source	Rating
AllMusic	4/5 stars
Deseret News	1.5/4 stars
Drowned in Sound	8/10
Rock Hard	7/10
The San Diego Union-Tribune	1/4 stars

Exclaim! wrote: "Their sound has a heaviness that sticks out among their sunny-sided SoCal brethren. This is the sort of thing that would come out of New York, sounding like Helmet meets Sick Of It All." The San Diego Union-Tribune called the album "nothing more than a lame attempt to rip off Rage Against the Machine."

== Track listing ==
No.	Title	Length
1.	"Happy"	3:40
2.	"Impression"	3:00
3.	"Kill the Messenger"	2:26
4.	"Liar"	2:23
5.	"Just Like You"	3:02
6.	"Disappointed"	2:45
7.	"My Contempt"	3:24
8.	"Salvation"	2:20
9.	"Fuck Your Scene"	1:36
10.	"In Doubt"	2:01
11.	"Wrung Up"	3:31
12.	"New Day" (Bonus track Japan release only)	3:11
Total length:		33:19

== Personnel ==
Straight Faced

- Johnny Miller – vocals
- David Tonic – guitar
- Jeff Hibben – bass
- Ron Moeller – drums

Production

- Recorded at Grandmaster Recorders, Hollywood, California, USA
- Produced by Blag Dahlia & Bradley Cook
- Recorded by Bradley Cook
- Mixed by Blag Dahlia & Bradley Cook at Bay7, North Hollywood, California
- Mastered by Gene Grimaldi at Oasis Mastering, Burbank, California
