= The Scarecrow (1920 film) =

1920 film

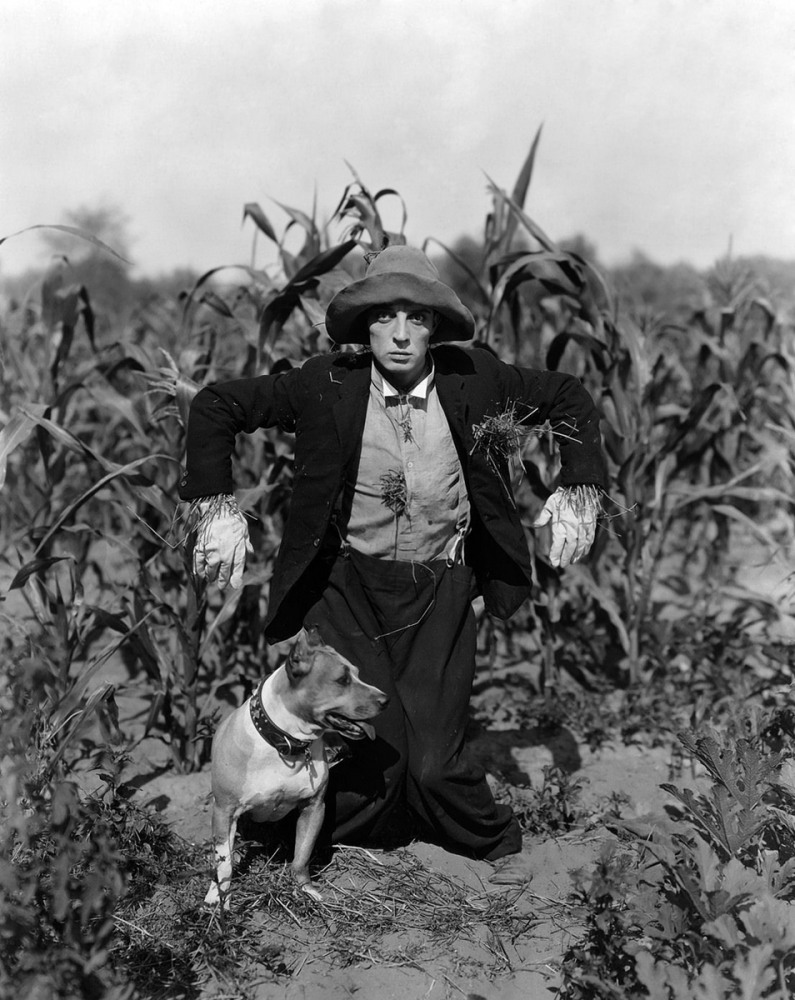
- Buster Keaton and Luke
- Directed by: Edward F. Cline; Buster Keaton
- Written by: Edward F. Cline; Buster Keaton
- Produced by: Joseph M. Schenck
- Starring: Buster Keaton; Sybil Seely; Joe Keaton; Joe Roberts
- Cinematography: Elgin Lessley
- Edited by: Buster Keaton
- Distributed by: Metro Pictures
- Release date: December 22, 1920
- Running time: 21 minutes
- Country: United States
- Language: Silent (English intertitles)

The Scarecrow is a 1920 American two-reel silent comedy film starring Buster Keaton, and written and directed by Keaton and Edward F. Cline.

== Plot ==
The Scarecrow

Buster plays a farmhand who competes with his housemate (Roberts) to win the love of the farmer's daughter (Sybil Seely). Running from a dog that he believes is rabid, he races around brick walls, jumps through windows, and falls into a hay thresher that rips off most of his clothes. After Sybil’s father sees him in this compromising position, he is forced to flee and borrow a scarecrow's clothes in a nearby field as a disguise. After he escapes, he runs into Sybil and trips into a kneeling position while tying his shoes which Sybil interprets as a proposal. They speed off on a motorcycle, with Joe and the farmer (played by Buster's father, Joe) in hot pursuit. Scooping up a minister during the chase, they are married on the speeding motorcycle and splash into a stream, where they are pronounced man and wife.

== Cast ==
Buster accidentally proposes to Sybil in The Scarecrow (1920).

- Buster Keaton as Farmhand #1
- Edward F. Cline as Hit-and-Run Truck Driver (uncredited)
- Luke the Dog as The "Mad" Dog (uncredited)
- Joe Keaton as Farmer (uncredited)
- Joe Roberts as Farmhand #2 (uncredited)
- Sybil Seely as Farmer's Daughter (uncredited)
- Al St. John as Man with Motorbike (uncredited)

== Music ==
In 2013, the Dallas Chamber Symphony commissioned composer Brian Satterwhite to write and original musical score for The Scarecrow. It premiered during a concert screening at Moody Performance Hall on November 19, 2013 with Richard McKay conducting.

== See also ==
- List of American films of 1920
- Buster Keaton filmography
