= The Strange Adventures of Prince Courageous =

1923 film series by Frederick G. Becker

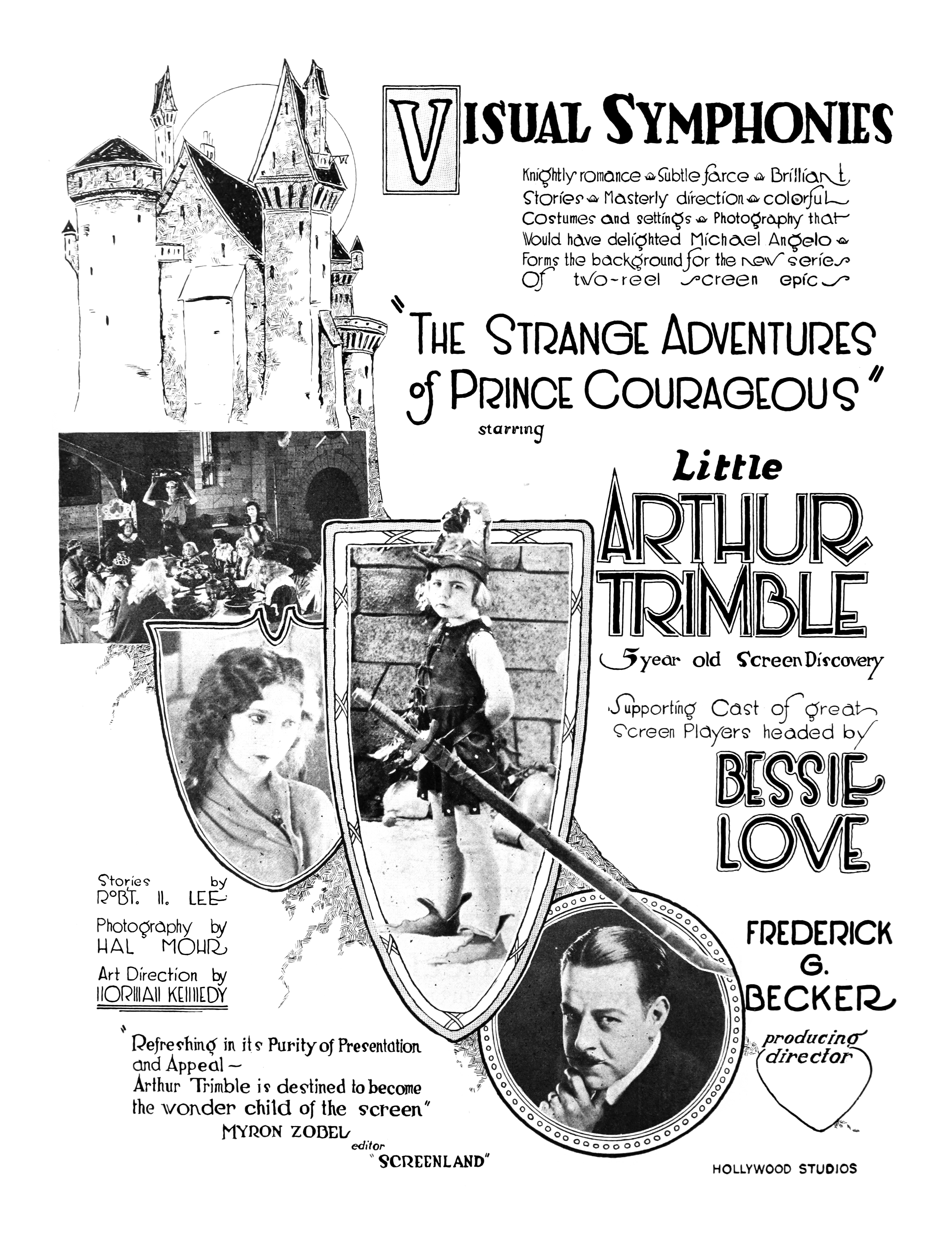
- Advertisement for the Series
- Directed by: Frederick G. Becker
- Screenplay by: Robert N. Lee
- Produced by: Clem Beauchamp
- Starring: Bessie Love; Arthur Trimble
- Cinematography: Hal Mohr
- Production company: Arthur Trimble Productions
- Distributed by: Anchor Film Distributors
- Release date: April 7, 1923 (The Little Knight)
- Running time: 2 reels (each film)
- Country: United States
- Language: Silent (English intertitles)
- Budget: $22,000 (each film)

The Strange Adventures of Prince Courageous, also known as The Adventures of Prince Courageous, is a 1923 American silent fantasy film series starring Bessie Love and five-year-old Arthur Trimble, directed by Frederick G. Becker.

Although it was planned to be a series of 12 two-reelers, only three films were made: The Little Knight, The Love Charm, and The Crown of Courage (also referred to as The Crown and Courage). A fourth film, The Little Defender, is documented in publications from as early as the 1930s, but is most likely an alternate title for The Crown of Courage.

The Little Knight is preserved at the Harvard Film Archive, and The Little Defender is rare, but commercially available. The preservation status of The Love Charm is unknown.

== Production ==
Norman Kennedy was the art director for the series, which re-used much of the sets and costumes from Douglas Fairbanks in Robin Hood (1922). Director Frederick G. Becker had been an actor in Robin Hood.

== Cast ==
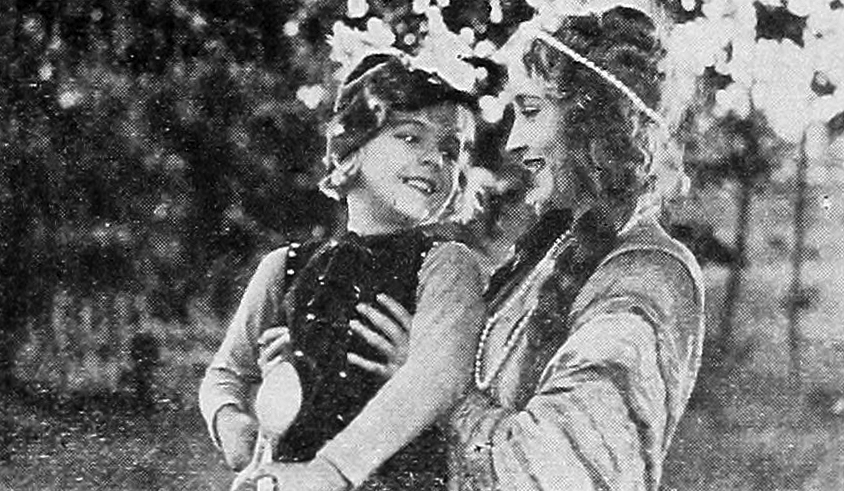
Arthur Trimble and Bessie Love

The same cast was used throughout the series.

- Bessie Love as Bernice
- Little Arthur Trimble as Prince Courageous (the boy)
- William Butts as Prince Courageous (the man)
- Roy Coulson as Bwump, the wicked witch
- Frederick Peterson as Bwop, the witch's brother
- "Boots" Fabing as King Lagg
- Monte Collins as Duke Craven
- Doreen Turner as Beatrice
- Charles Belcher as the wise man
- Gilbert Clayton as the varlet
- Grace Woods as serving maid
- Irene De Voss as the guest

== Plot summaries ==
=== The Little Knight ===
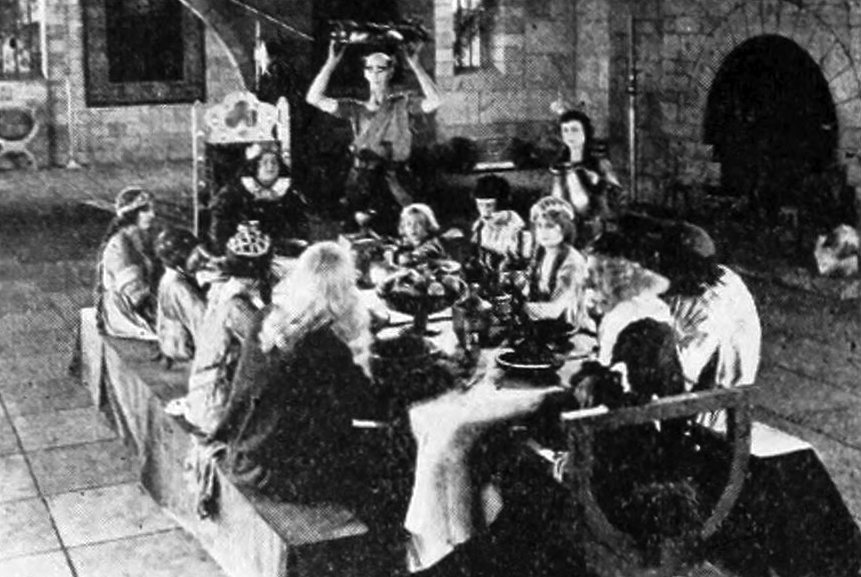
The banquet hall scene from The Little Knight

A knight (Butts) kills the giant son of a witch, and the witch (Coulson) retaliates by turning the knight into a little boy (Trimble). One day, King Lagg (Fabing) encounters the little knight in the forest, and invites him back to his castle, where the knight falls in love with the king's daughter Beatrice (Turner), who is to marry Duke Craven (Collins). The little knight saves princess from abduction, and the witch's spell is broken by the king's magicians.

=== The Little Defender ===
When King Lagg leaves on a trip, and must take his Royal Guard with him, the castle is left unprotected. His son, the little prince (Trimble) takes on the responsibility of defending the castle when a band of renegades attacks the castle. The prince pulls together a ragtag army and saves the castle.

== Release and reception ==
Although it is unclear whether the films were formally screened in theaters, the first film was shown at Hollywood's Granada Theater, and the audience was asked to vote whether they liked it. 95% of the votes were positive.
