= The Old Reliable =

1951 novel by P. G. Wodehouse

- First edition (UK)
- Author: P. G. Wodehouse
- Language: English
- Genre: Comic novel
- Publisher: Herbert Jenkins (UK); Doubleday & Co (US)
- Publication date: 18 April 1951 (UK); 11 October 1951 (US)
- Publication place: United Kingdom
- Media type: Print

The Old Reliable is a novel by P. G. Wodehouse, first published in the United Kingdom on 18 April 1951 by Herbert Jenkins, London and in the United States on 11 October 1951 by Doubleday & Co, New York. The novel was serialised in Collier's magazine from 24 June to 22 July 1950, under the title Phipps to the Rescue.

The story is set in Hollywood, and follows the romantic and financial difficulties of various film stars, writers, movie moguls, butlers and safe-crackers.

== Plot ==
Former actress Adela Cork owns the Beverly Hills property known as the Carmen Flores place, after the famous and tempestuous Mexican actress who previously owned the house. Flores was killed in a plane crash the previous year. The will of Adela's late wealthy husband Alfred says Adela should support his impecunious brother Smedley, though she merely lets him live in her house. Smedley dislikes living with Adela, who makes him drink yoghurt instead of cocktails. Adela's sister Bill, a former scriptwriter, is ghostwriting Adela's memoirs. Adela's impeccable butler Phipps is nervous that Bill, who was part of the jury that sentenced him to prison for safecracking a few years ago, will tell Adela about his past which he has kept secret, but she promises not to tell. Smedley hopes to find the late Carmen Flores's diary. He believes she wrote about her affairs with men who would pay to have it suppressed. Bill thinks Smedley needs looking after and wants to marry him, but Smedley has doubts about marriage.

In New York, Joe Davenport, Bill's former co-worker, asks Bill's niece Kay Shannon in a joking way if she will marry him. Kay likes him but turns him down because she thinks he is not serious. They both separately go to California. Bill suggests to Joe that they buy her literary agent's business for twenty thousand dollars. Bill wants Joe to fund the purchase, since he won a radio jackpot, but he explains that he has nearly spent all his winnings. Joe later meets Smedley, who looks rich, and gives him a car ride hoping for money. Adela has invited Kay and the rich Lord Topham to her house, hoping they will marry. Adela gives Phipps notice for looking around in her bedroom against her orders. He tells Bill that he was looking for the valuable diary of the late Carmen Flores, and has not found it. Joe comes to the house, having been invited by Smedley while they were out drinking. Smedley was celebrating because he found the diary, which is written in Spanish, on top of Adela's wardrobe. He has been offered fifty thousand dollars for it. By pretending to help translate it, Adela tricks Smedley into giving her the diary.

Bill reveals to Smedley, Kay, and Joe that Phipps is a safecracker, and suggests that he get the diary from Adela's safe. Phipps's cut will be five thousand dollars. He agrees. Late that night, they assemble to steal the diary. However, Phipps has been hired by movie mogul Jacob Glutz to play butler roles, and is unwilling to risk being caught burgling. Bill comes up with the idea to give Phipps strong drinks and taunt him into burgling the safe by suggesting he has lost his skill. Phipps becomes drunk and remarkably less formal, then goes to break open the safe after being taunted by Bill. Kay tells Bill that she loves Joe but thinks his proposals are too flippant, though Bill thinks he is just shy. Phipps fails to focus on his task and argues in a disjointed way with Smedley and Joe before falling asleep. Joe tells Bill he is too shy to propose to Kay seriously. Bill knocks Joe out with her only Mickey Finn drug, planning to make Kay sympathetic to him. Bill wakes up Phipps, who does not remember anything from when he was drunk. She claims Phipps knocked out Joe. Kay sees Joe unconscious and instantly goes to his side, as Bill planned. Joe recovers, and is happily surprised that Kay returns his feelings. Phipps apologizes and works on the safe. Smedley inadvertently makes noise and wakes up Adela.

Adela investigates but is stopped by Bill, who stalls by talking to Lord Topham. Topham loves Gladys "Toots" Fauntleroy, but they had an argument about her new hat. He sent a cable to England apologizing and awaits her reply. A sergeant and patrolman arrive, having been telephoned by Adela. Bill again stalls by talking to the policeman about their ambition to become actors. Bill keeps them occupied long enough for Phipps to finish his task and dismiss the policemen. However, Phipps refuses to give Smedley the diary and keeps it. Topham learns that Toots loves him still, making him very amenable, but he cannot lend Bill the money she needs for the literary agency because he can't spend his money out of England. Adela thinks Bill took the diary and telephones the police again. Bill convinces Phipps to give the diary to Smedley by pointing out that Phipps will be in trouble if the police find it. She also convinces Adela that Smedley could sue her for losing a diary he had an offer for, which would bring her bad publicity. She persuades Adela to pay him off with thirty thousand dollars, with a check made out to Bill. The two policemen return and are cheerful, having been hired as background actors. Later, Phipps says that the book he gave to Smedley was not actually the diary, and is not even in Spanish. Smedley protests that it is in Spanish and gives it to Phipps to show him, but Phipps takes it and drives off. Bill is amazed that Smedley has again been tricked out of the diary, and wants to look after him. She asks him to marry her and he agrees.

== Characters ==
- Wilhelmina "Bill" Shannon – Genial writer in her early 40s who is ghostwriting Adela's memoirs and loves Smedley, known as "The Old Reliable" for her ability to come up with schemes to solve problems
- Adela Shannon Cork – Former silent film star known as the "Empress of Stormy Emotion", formidable widow of the rich Alfred Cork and sister of Bill
- Smedley Cork – Stout, impecunious brother of Adela's late husband Alfred who looks like a Roman emperor and lost his wealth investing in Broadway musicals
- Joe Davenport – Writer and Bill's former co-worker who was blacklisted in Hollywood for throwing a book at Ivor Llewellyn's head, wants to marry Kay
- Kay Shannon – Bill and Adela's niece who loves Joe but thinks he is not serious
- James Phipps – Tall, dignified, respectful English butler who works for Adela Cork and served time in prison for burglary in New York
- Lancelot, Lord Topham – Young, rich English peer staying at Adela's house who is not very intelligent and is known to his friends as "Toppy"
- Sergeant Ward and Patrolman Bill Morehouse – Policemen and aspiring actors

== Background ==
According to Richard Usborne's book Wodehouse at Work to the End, Wodehouse adapted his novel Spring Fever (1948) into a play with an American setting and characters for actor Edward Everett Horton, but Horton was unable to use the play due to other commitments, so Wodehouse turned the play into the novel The Old Reliable.

== Publication history ==
The story was serialized in Collier's under the title Phipps to the Rescue with illustrations by Harry Beckhoff.

The first UK edition dust jacket cover was illustrated by Frank Ford. The Old Reliable was included in the Wodehouse novel collection titled Five Complete Novels, published in 1983 by Avenel Books.

== Adaptations ==
The book was adapted as a radio drama by Felix Felton. It first aired on 4 December 1954 on the BBC Home Service. The cast included Tucker McGuire as Bill Shannon, Peggy Hassard as Kay Shannon, MacDonald Parke as Smedley Cork, Bessie Love as Adela Cork, Richard Hurndall as Phipps, Errol MacKinnon as Joe Davenport, Derek Hart as Lord Topham, John Gabriel as the police sergeant, and Brian Haines as the patrolman. The producer was John Gibson.

The Old Reliable was dramatised for television by Robert Mundy. The adaptation aired on 4 November 1988 under the title Tales from the Hollywood Hills: The Old Reliable on the US television anthology series Great Performances, with Lynn Redgrave as Wilhelmina "Bill" Shannon, Rosemary Harris as Adela Shannon, Ray Reinhardt as Alfred Cork, Joseph Maher as Smedley Cork, Paxton Whitehead as Phipps, Tom Isbell as Joe, Lori Loughlin as Kay Cork, Lou Jacobi as Jacob Glutz, and John DiSanti as the Sergeant.
