= Charlotte Mineau =

American actress (1886–1979)

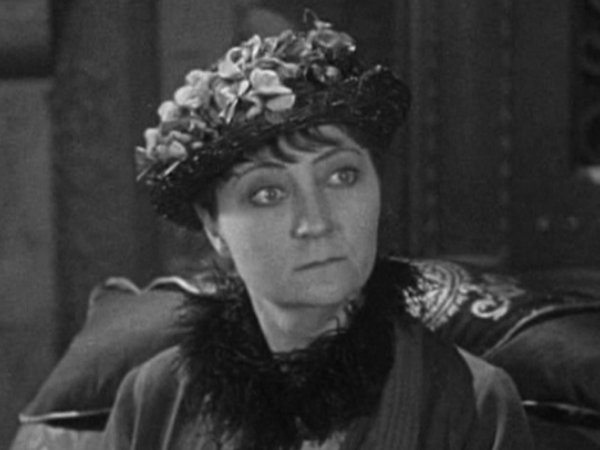
- Born: March 24, 1886; Michigan, United States
- Died: October 12, 1979 (aged 93); Los Angeles, California, US
- Occupation: Actress
- Years active: 1913–1932

Charlotte Mineau (March 24, 1886 – October 12, 1979) was a tall and thin American film actress of the silent era appearing in 65 to 80 films.

== Biography ==
Mineau appeared in 65 films between 1913 and 1931. She supported Charlie Chaplin on numerous occasions, and also appeared in several very early Laurel and Hardy comedies.

One of her last screen appearances was with the Marx Brothers and Thelma Todd in Monkey Business (1931) where she appears as "Emily", a woman overheard by Groucho having an illicit affair on the veranda during the party scene. Her last known film appearance was in the Hal Roach two-reeler, Strictly Unreliable (1932), again with Thelma Todd and ZaSu Pitts, in which Mineau, credited as "Charlotte Meno", plays Todd's landlady, Mrs. Hawkins.

Mineau was born in Michigan and died in Los Angeles, California.

== Partial filmography ==
- Two Hearts That Beat as Ten (1915, Short) - The Nurse
- His New Job (1915, Short) - Film Star (uncredited)
- Sweedie Goes to College (1915, Short) - Mrs. Knowledge - the Matron
- A Bunch of Keys (1915) - Rose Keys
- A Night in the Show (1915, Short) - Lady in the Stalls (uncredited)
- The Floorwalker (1916, Short) - Store Detective
- The Vagabond (1916, Short) - Girl's mother
- The Count (1916, Short) - Mrs. Moneybags (uncredited)
- The Pawnshop (1916, Short) - Customer (uncredited)
- The Rink (1916, Short) - Edna's Friend (uncredited)
- Easy Street (1917, Short) - Big Eric's Wife (uncredited)
- Rosemary Climbs the Heights (1918) - Mme. Thamar Fedoreska
- Carolyn of the Corners (1919) - Amanda Parlow
- Married Life (1920) - Impatient Patient
- Love, Honor and Behave (1920) - A Merry Widow
- Love Is an Awful Thing (1922) - Marion
- The Extra Girl (1923) - Belle Brown
- Happiness (1924) - Head Saleslady
- Baby Clothes (1926, Short) - Mrs. Weedle
- Sparrows (1926) - Mrs. Grimes
- Get 'Em Young (1926, Short) - Hired bride
- 45 Minutes from Hollywood (1926, Short) - Orville's Mother
- Love 'em and Weep (1927, Short) - Mrs. Aggie Tillsbury
- The First Auto (1927) - Mrs. Stebbins (uncredited)
- Sugar Daddies (1927, Short) - Mrs. Brittle
- Monkey Business (1931)
- Beach Pajamas (1931, Short)
- Strictly Unreliable (1932, Short) - Mrs. Hawkins - Landlady
