= Carolyn of the Corners =

1919 silent film by Robert Thornby

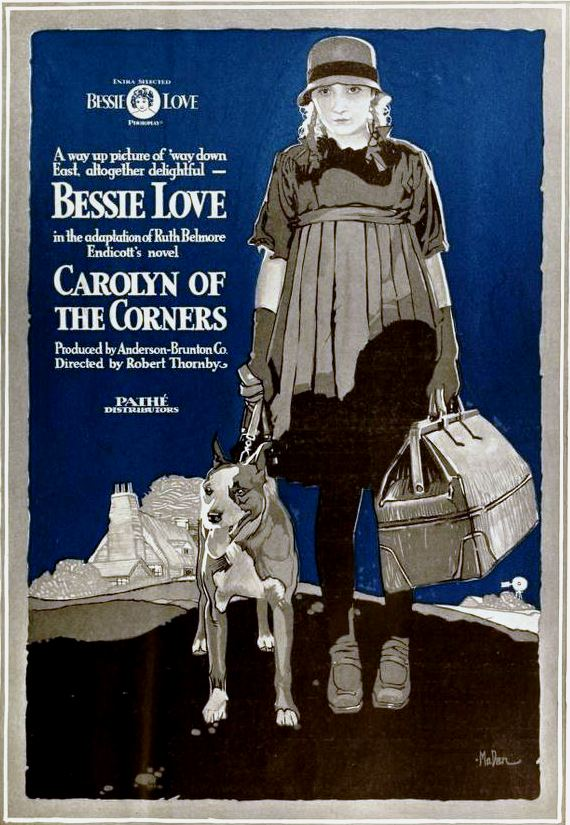
- Magazine advertisement
- Directed by: Robert Thornby
- Screenplay by: Frank S. Beresford
- Based on: Carolyn of the Corners (novel) by Ruth Belmore Endicott
- Produced by: Anderson-Brunton
- Starring: Bessie Love; Charles Edler; Charlotte Mineau
- Cinematography: Frank B. Good
- Production company: Pathé Exchange
- Distributed by: Pathé Exchange
- Release dates: March 9, 1919 (U.S. original release); June 11, 1922 (U.S. re-release)
- Running time: 60 minutes; 5 reels (original release); approx. 30 minutes; 3 reels (re-release)
- Country: United States
- Language: Silent (English intertitles)

Carolyn of the Corners is a 1919 American silent drama film directed by Robert Thornby, and starring Bessie Love, Charles Edler and Charlotte Mineau.

The screenplay by Frank S. Beresford was based on the 1918 novel of the same name by Ruth Belmore Endicott.

The film is presumed lost.

== Plot ==
Young Carolyn May Cameron, is orphaned when her parents are lost at sea. She and her dog Prince leave the family's Harlem flat to go to live with her uncle Joe in Maine. She becomes friends with her uncle's former fiancee, Amanda, and slowly helps repair their relationship.

While visiting an ill friend, Carolyn and Amanda are trapped in a forest fire. Joe rescues them, and he and Amanda fall back in love. They get married, and Carolyn decides to return to Harlem.

Once home again, she is overcome by sadness, but is interrupted by her parents, who were not actually lost at sea.

== Cast ==
- Bessie Love as Carolyn May Cameron
- Charles Edler as Joe Stagg
- Charlotte Mineau as Amanda Parlow
- Eunice Moore as Aunt Rose Kennedy

== Production ==
For the snow scenes, "an extra force of technical experts" were required to create the effect "in spite of the heat of the California sun."

== Reception ==
One reviewer praised the film for not being melodramatic, and for being suitable for and entertaining to children. Multiple reviewers cited the 20-year-old Love as being quite convincing as a child, one calling her performance "a triumph of natural acting."

== Re-release ==
In 1922, the film was edited down to 3 reels, and released as a "Pathé Playlet".
