= Guilty (Straight Faced album) =

Studio album by Straight Faced
- Released: October 30, 1995
- Genre: Hardcore punk
- Length: 43:17
- Label: Fearless Records
- Producer: Jim Goodwin

Straight Faced chronology
Guilty (1995)	Broken (1996)

Professional ratings
Review scores
Source	Rating
Allmusic	4/5 stars

Guilty is the first full-length studio album from hardcore punk band, Straight Faced. It was released in September, 1995 on Fearless Records.

== Track listing ==
No.	Title	Length
1.	"No Gain On the Play"	2:25
2.	"Disillusioned"	1:55
3.	"Wrecked Myself"	1:37
4.	"To Whom It May Concern"	1:47
5.	"Means To An End"	3:19
6.	"Guilty"	3:26
7.	"In Through Out"	2:43
8.	"Dope Fiend"	2:14
9.	"Gone"	2:29
10.	"Out Of Range"	2:34
11.	"Standing On The Edge"	2:59
12.	"Better Than"	2:44
13.	"Omit"	3:40
14.	"Painful"	3:10
15.	"(Untitled Track)"	6:15
Total length:		43:17

== Personnel ==
Straight Faced

- Johnny Miller – vocals
- Kevin Grossman – guitar
- Damon Beard – guitar
- Sam Marrs – bass
- Ron Moeller – drums

Production

- Recorded & Produced by Jim Goodwin
- Cover Art by Tim Martin
- Layout by Craig Olivas Design
- Photos by Phil White & Alexis Longo
