= Chasen's =

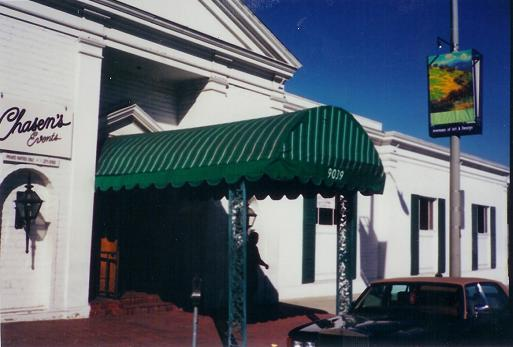
- Chasen's entrance from Beverly Blvd. October 1997
- Interactive map of Chasen's

Restaurant information
- Established: December 1936; 89 years ago
- Closed: April 1, 1995; 31 years ago
- Previous owners: Dave Chasen (1936–1973); Maude Chasen (1973–1995)
- Food type: American
- Dress code: Formal
- Location: 9039 Beverly Boulevard, West Hollywood, California, 90048, US
- Coordinates: 34.0774°N 118.3892°W
- Known for: Favorite of Hollywood elite and other celebrities

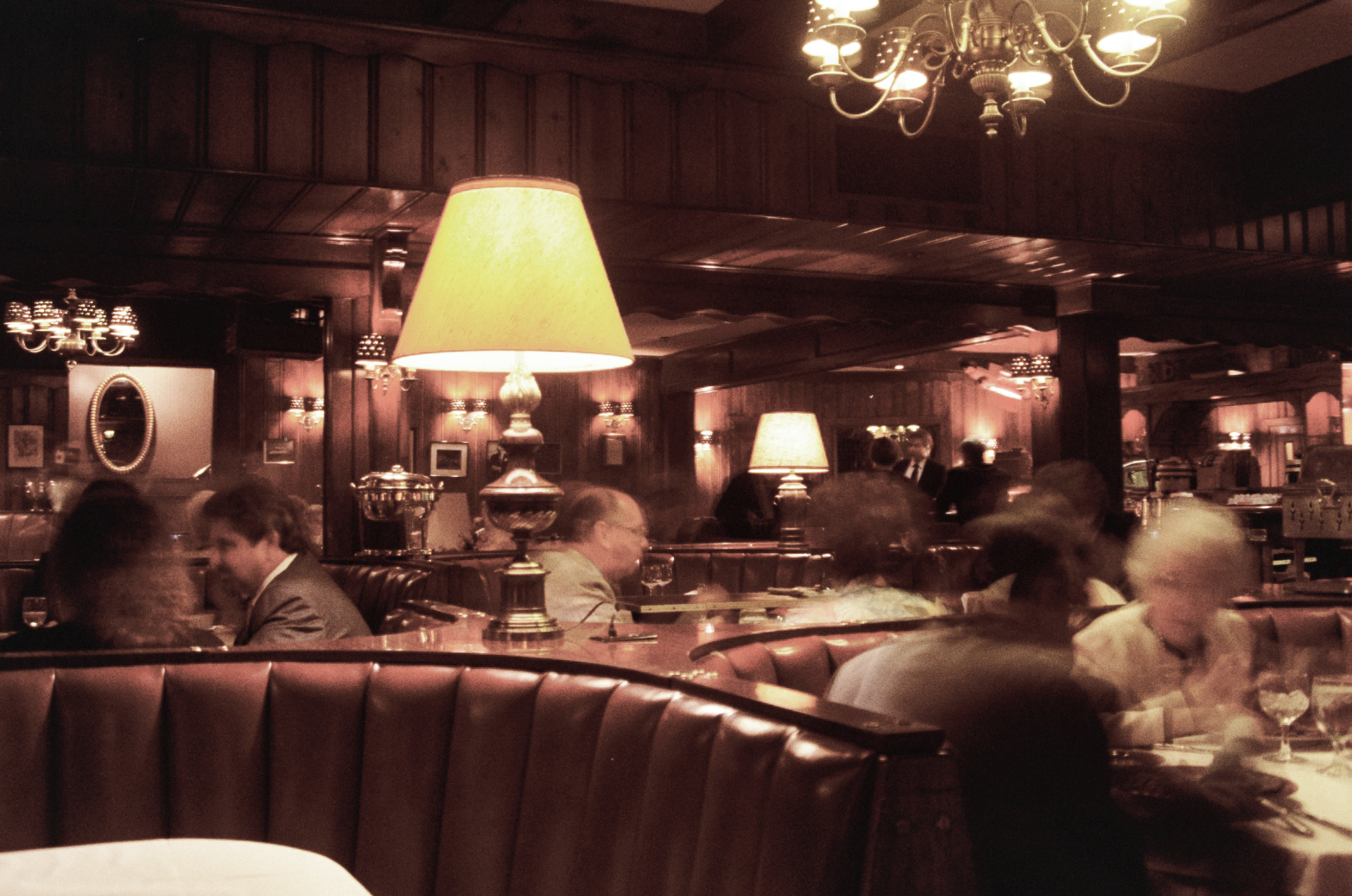
Chasen's interior, June 1987

Chasen's was a famous restaurant frequented by film stars, entertainers, politicians, and other dignitaries in West Hollywood, California, located at 9039 Beverly Boulevard on the border of Beverly Hills. It opened for business in 1936 and was the site of the Academy Awards party for many years. It was also famous for its chili. Elizabeth Taylor had several orders of Chasen's chili flown to the set of Cleopatra in 1963 while filming in Rome, and to Oroville, California during the filming of The Klansman in 1974.

Many of the restaurant's regular customers had booths named in their honor. The Ronald Reagan booth is now on display at the Ronald Reagan Presidential Library, and was where Reagan proposed to his actress wife Nancy Davis.

Well-known celebrities with their own booths included Frank Sinatra, Alfred Hitchcock, James Stewart, and Groucho Marx. The restaurant suffered a decline in business over the course of many years and closed permanently in 1995.

== History ==
Comedian Dave Chasen, who had starred in many shows, especially with Joe Cook, such as Fine and Dandy, opened the restaurant in December 1936 on the advice of director Frank Capra. Capra had to lend Chasen his silverware for the restaurant's operation.

It was initially called "Chasen's Southern Pit". The New Yorker's founder/editor Harold Ross funded the operation, along with business associate Daniel Silberberg. It was nothing more than a shack at the beginning, but it quickly became well known for its chili and was soon a favorite among Hollywood stars.

When Walt Disney went to Chasen's to have dinner in late 1937 following the success of Snow White and the Seven Dwarfs, he met conductor Leopold Stokowski and talked to him about arranging Paul Dukas' The Sorcerer's Apprentice for a short with Mickey Mouse and he agreed which eventually led to the development of Disney's 3rd full-length animated film Fantasia.

== Clients ==
Walt Disney, Leopold Stokowski, Cary Grant, Jack Benny, Jackie Gleason, and W. C. Fields were among its customers.

As newer generations took the reins of Hollywood, trendier restaurants drew the celebrities and "stole" some of Chasen's clientele, but many stayed faithful to the end. Ronald Reagan and Frank Sinatra as well as Richard Nixon, Gregory Peck, Bob Hope, and Jack Lord were still regulars, along with newer celebrities such as Jack Nicholson, John Travolta and Mel Gibson.

Ed McMahon and Johnny Carson were frequent guests. Carol Burnett treated guest stars of her variety show to dinner at Chasen's following the Friday night tapings from 1967 to 1978. Chasen's did not accept credit cards. Instead, established or recognized customers simply signed for their charges and had a bill mailed to them.

The restaurant closed on April 1, 1995, and the site was used for private parties and as a filming location (The Opposite of Sex). In 1997, its contents were auctioned, including pictures, bars, booths, and paneling. Many original photos and artwork from Chasen's walls, ten of the booths, and the barstools are now found in Santa Paula, California in the Mupu Grill on Main street, including a piece by LeRoy Neiman of Tommy The Maitre'D. Comedian Brian Haley purchased the Frank Sinatra booth, the bar, the front awning, and many other items. The original building was demolished except for the Beverly Blvd side and a Bristol Farms grocery store was built on the site. The store's cafe features several booths from the original Chasen's and some of the original paneling.

After it closed, investor Grady Sanders bought the name from the Chasen family and opened a new Chasen's in Beverly Hills in 1997. However, this restaurant closed in April 2000.

== See also ==
- Brown Derby
- Perino's
