= Brown Derby =

Chain of restaurants in Los Angeles

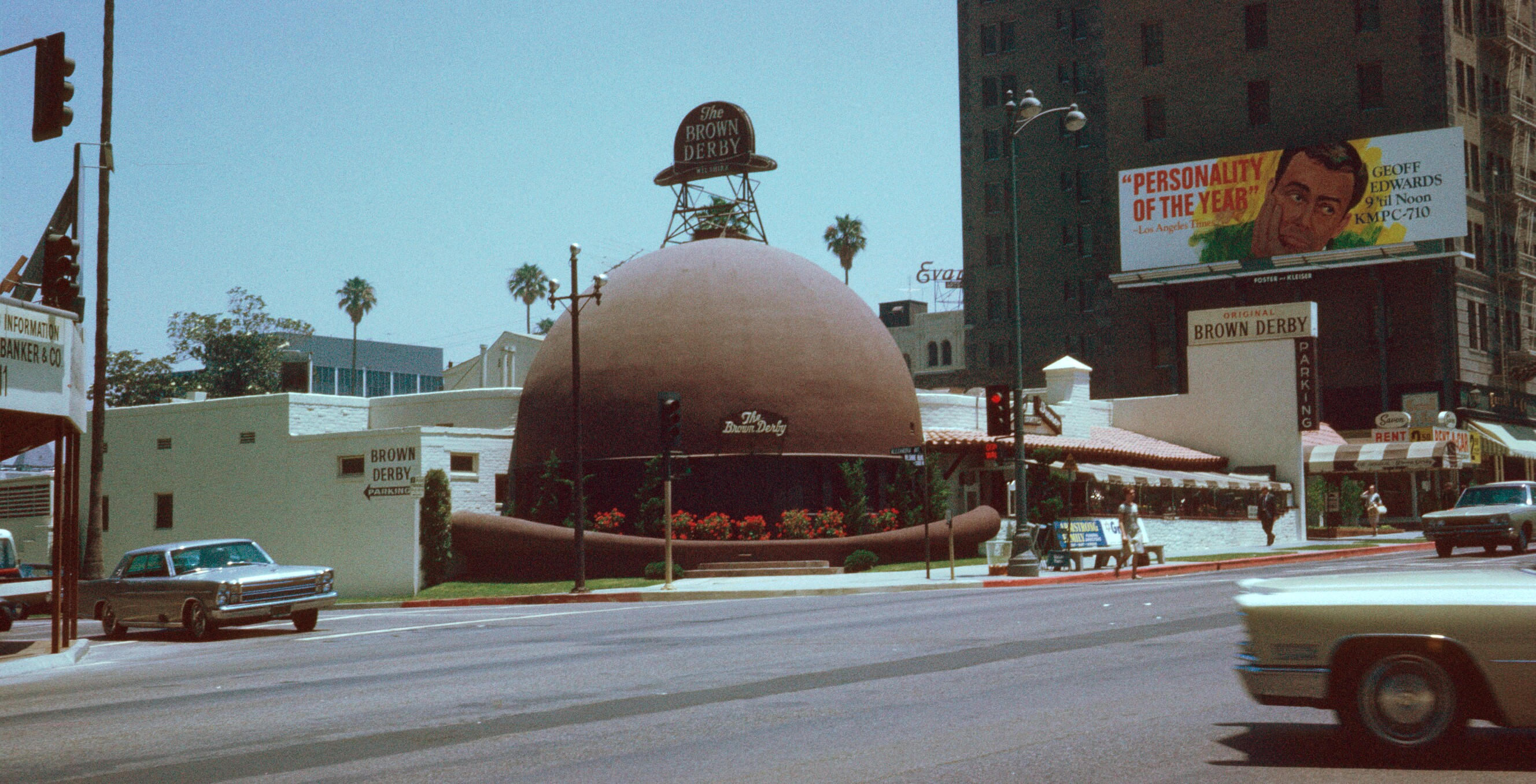
- The Brown Derby at 3377 Wilshire Boulevard in Los Angeles, c. 1968
- Interactive map of Brown Derby

Restaurant information
- Established: 1926; 100 years ago
- Previous owner: Wilson Mizner
- Food type: American
- Dress code: Formal
- Location: United States

Brown Derby was a chain of restaurants in Los Angeles, California. The first and best known was shaped like a derby hat, an iconic image that became synonymous with the Golden Age of Hollywood. It was opened by Wilson Mizner in 1926. The chain was started by Robert H. Cobb and Herbert K. Somborn (a former husband of film star Gloria Swanson) in the 1920s. The original Brown Derby restaurants had closed or had been converted to other uses by the 1980s, though a Disney-backed Brown Derby national franchising program revived the brand in the 21st century. It is often incorrectly thought that the Brown Derby was a single restaurant, and the Wilshire Boulevard and Hollywood branches are frequently confused.

There is a non-related chain of steakhouse restaurants founded in 1941 in Akron, Ohio, and franchised in 1962. This chain was founded by Ted and Gus Girves, and the full name of these restaurants is "Girves Brown Derby". As of 2026, three of the Girves chain are still in business.

== Wilshire Boulevard Brown Derby ==
=== First Wilshire Derby ===
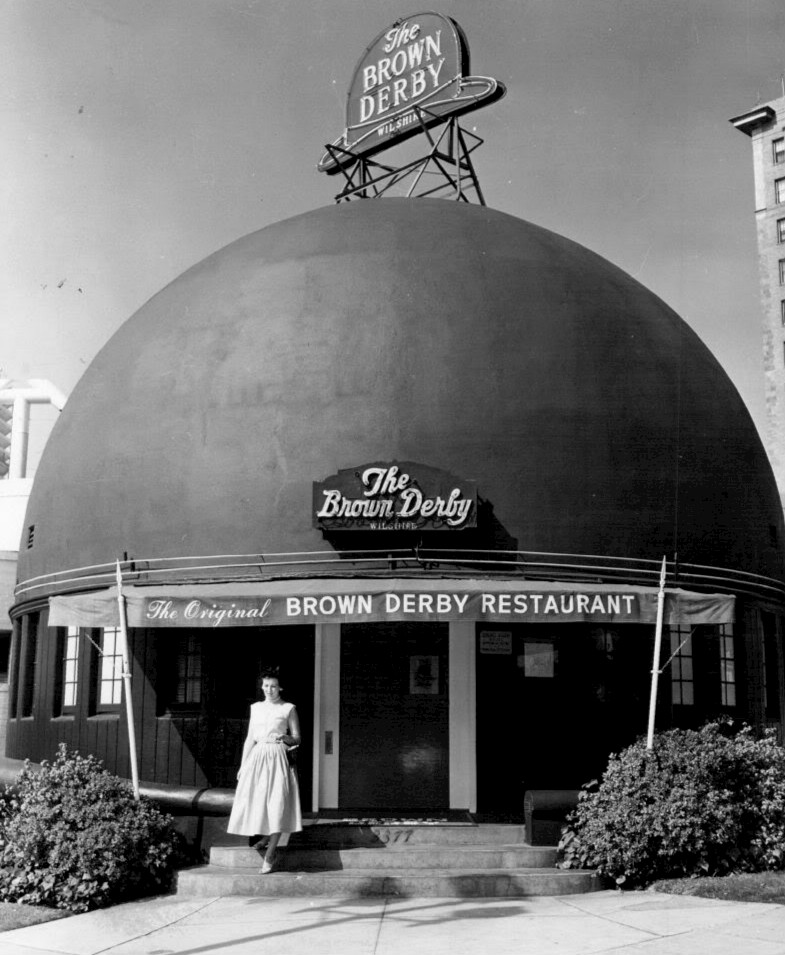
Entrance to the restaurant in 1956

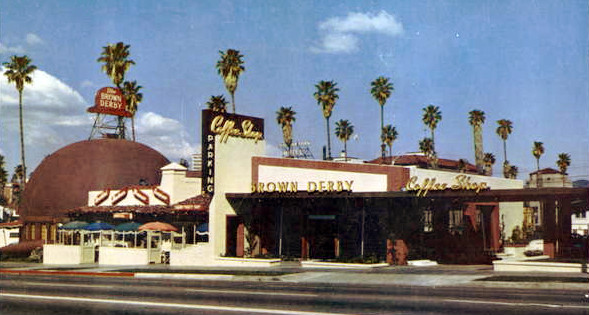
The Wilshire Boulevard Brown Derby in 1952

The first restaurant was opened in February 1926 at 3427 Wilshire Boulevard in a building built in the distinctive shape of a derby hat. Programmatic architecture was then in vogue, and the restaurant was designed to catch the eye of passing motorists. The Brown Derby name originated from a Malverne, New York-based restaurant of the same name that had been a hang-out for vaudevillians in the 1920s. It was founded by Wilson Mizner as a small cafe, across the street from the Hollywood hot spot the Cocoanut Grove at the Ambassador Hotel. Wilson was the front man; Herbert K. Somborn owned the property and Jack L. Warner put up the money. Wilson Mizner sat in booth 50 almost every day. Unfortunately the original restaurant was small and suffered from acoustic problems in which sound from one end of the building bounced off the semicircular ceiling and traveled to the other side of the room.

==== Subsequent uses ====
Most of the rest of the block bounded by Wilshire Boulevard, Sixth Street, Mariposa Avenue and Alexandria Avenue was occupied by the Chapman Park Hotel and Bungalows which wanted to acquire the rest of the block that it did not own, including the lot that the original Derby had occupied. After the restaurant moved out in May 1936, the building was demolished and the hotel was expanded and occupied by October of the same year. The hotel itself was replaced in 1967 by the Equitable Life Building.

=== Replacement Wilshire building ===
In 1936, a larger building, also in the shape of a hat, was constructed at 3377 Wilshire Boulevard at the northeast corner of Wilshire Boulevard and Alexandria Avenue, about a block from its previous location (and directly across the street from the Ambassador Hotel). The restaurant was able to move into its new home in May of that year.

In 1947's Fun and Fancy Free, the "Mickey and the Beanstalk" segment ends with Willie the Giant's stomping through Hollywood looking for Mickey Mouse. Before the scene closes, Willie notices The Brown Derby restaurant and picks up the restaurant looking for Mickey. Willie notices the restaurant looks like a hat, places it on his head, and stomps off with the lights of the Hollywood Sign blinking in the background.

The Wilshire Brown Derby was frequented by director Ed Wood and his entourage, including the psychic the Amazing Criswell and Criswell's wife Halo Meadows.

In September 1980, the restaurant closed without warning. Local preservationists worked to stop the building from being bulldozed, and convinced developers to remove and restore the derby hat portion of the building. The rest of the restaurant building was demolished and replaced with a shopping center. The derby-shaped structure was placed on the roof of the new building.

==== Subsequent uses ====
The parking lot was replaced in late 1985 by a shopping center known as the Brown Derby Plaza. The domed structure was incorporated into the third floor of the building, and is currently vacant; it formerly accommodated a Korean bar.

== Hollywood Brown Derby ==
- Hollywood Brown Derby
- U.S. Historic district – Contributing property
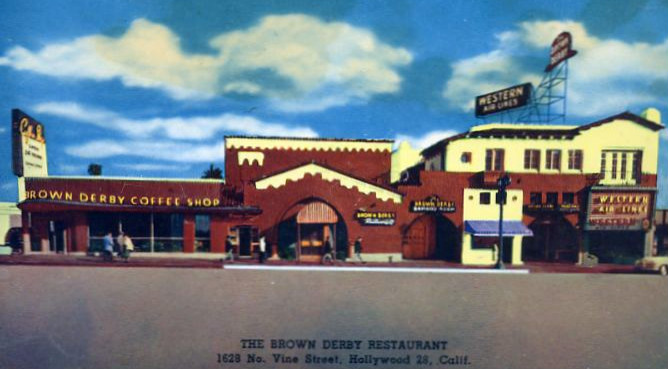
- Postcard of the building in the 1950s
- Location: 1628 N. Vine St., Hollywood, California
- Built: 1928
- Architect: Carl Jules Weyl
- Architectural style: Spanish Colonial Revival
- Demolished: 1994
- Part of: Hollywood Boulevard Commercial and Entertainment District (ID85000704)
- Designated CP: April 4, 1985

The second Brown Derby, designed by Carl Jules Weyl in the Spanish Colonial Revival style and built in 1928, opened at 1628 North Vine Street in Hollywood on Valentine's Day 1929. This branch played a greater part in Hollywood history due to its proximity to movie studios.

In the first of the Hollywood episodes of I Love Lucy ("L.A. at Last"), Lucy (Lucille Ball), Ethel (Vivian Vance), and Fred (William Frawley) have lunch at the Brown Derby. During the misadventure, the trio dine in a booth with Eve Arden on one side and William Holden on the other. This leads to the disaster scene in which Lucy inadvertently causes a waiter to hit Holden in the face with a pie.

Like its Wilshire Boulevard counterpart, the Hollywood Brown Derby had a celebrity wall with hundreds of celebrity drawings, paintings and caricatures. Jack Lane drew many of the caricatures between 1947 and 1985. Another artist whose work was displayed was Nicholas Volpe. He was commissioned by the Brown Derby to paint portraits of up to 200 top recording artists to be displayed in the restaurant's Hall of Fame Record Room. In addition, his Oscar-winning star portraits were displayed in the restaurant's "Academy Room," created for showing Volpe's art.

The Hollywood Brown Derby is the purported birthplace of the Cobb salad, which was said to have been hastily arranged from leftovers by owner Bob Cobb for showman and theater owner Sid Grauman. It was chopped fine, because Grauman had just had dental work done, and couldn't chew well.

According to Shirley Temple, the non-alcoholic drink bearing her name was invented at the Brown Derby in the mid-1930s. Temple herself never liked the drink and noted her personality rights had been used without permission.

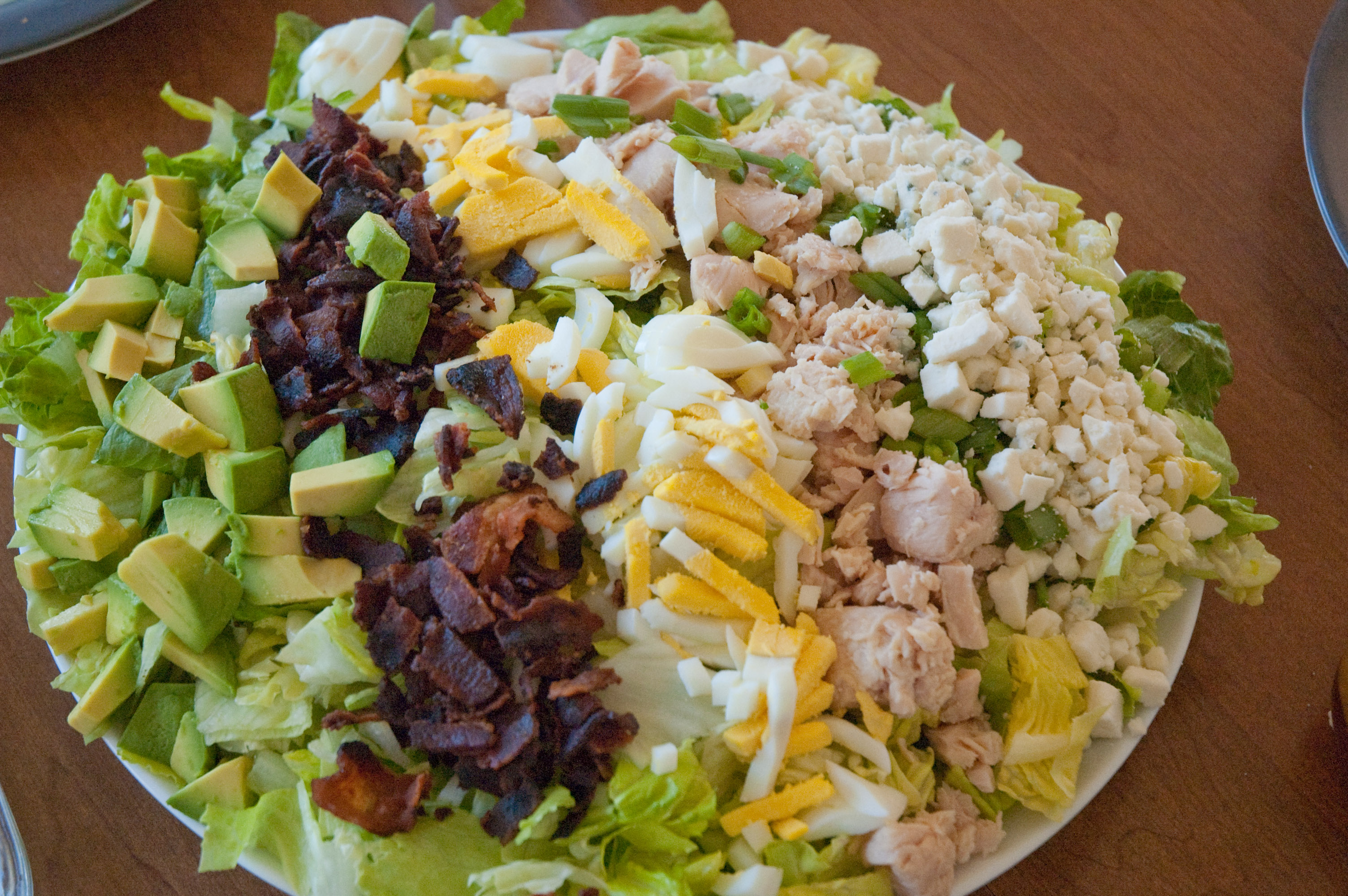
The Cobb Salad was invented at the Hollywood Brown Derby

In 1985, the Hollywood Boulevard Commercial and Entertainment District was added to the National Register of Historic Places, with the Hollywood Brown Derby building and an unnamed compatible building to its north (at 1632 Vine St.) listed as a contributing properties in the district. Aspects of the Brown Derby noted in the register include its Spanish Colonial Revival architecture, Churrigueresque detailing, arched entrance, wrought iron decorations, red tile roof, and its overall "extraordinary attention to detail," while aspects of the compatible building include its Spanish Colonial Revival architecture, false gable focal point, and Churrigueresque ornament.

The Hollywood Brown Derby closed for the last time at its original site on April 3, 1985, as a result of a lease dispute. The building was later occupied Arbat Continental Restaurant, when, in 1987, an early morning fire destroyed the kitchen. After the fire, the building deteriorated further as it remained unoccupied and suffered frequent break-ins from squatters and gang members. As a result of damage caused by the 1994 Northridge earthquake, the building at 1628 North Vine Street was declared unsafe by the City of Los Angeles and was the first building in Hollywood ordered to be demolished. It was razed the following month.

=== Subsequent uses ===
The remainder of the Hollywood Brown Derby building then became home to Premieres of Hollywood, which catered to the revitalization of Hollywood Boulevard and the style of "Old Hollywood". Premieres of Hollywood offered an eclectic mix of American cuisine along with the original Cobb Salad (the recipe was found in the kitchen during the renovation). Premieres of Hollywood was destroyed during the L.A. riots in 1992.

The land is now occupied by an apartment complex.

=== Later Brown Derby restaurants ===
After the original Hollywood Brown Derby at 1628 North Vine Street closed in April 1985 a spokesman for Walter P. Scharfe, who had purchased the chain a decade earlier, told the Los Angeles Times that the restaurant owner was “99% committed” to reopening the business at a new location. Late in 1986 Scharfe opened a new Brown Derby in the Lieberg Building at 911 E. Colorado Boulevard in Pasadena, California. The new restaurant would utilize the dark booths, crystal chandeliers, and 1500 caricatures removed from the original location. Scharfe opened another Brown Derby at 1707 N. Vine Street in Hollywood in October 1987. The location had most recently been a Howard Johnson's coffee shop and reopened as a more casual version of the famous eatery with a large painted derby hat gracing the exterior walls. In 1987 Scharfe told the Los Angeles Times that he had plans to open additional Brown Derby restaurants in Palm Springs, Honolulu, and Vancouver. Both restaurants closed after a short time. In 1994 Scharfe opened another Brown Derby at the Beverly Center shopping mall. The small location featured miniature replicas of the famous caricatures and closed in less than one year.

== Beverly Hills Brown Derby ==
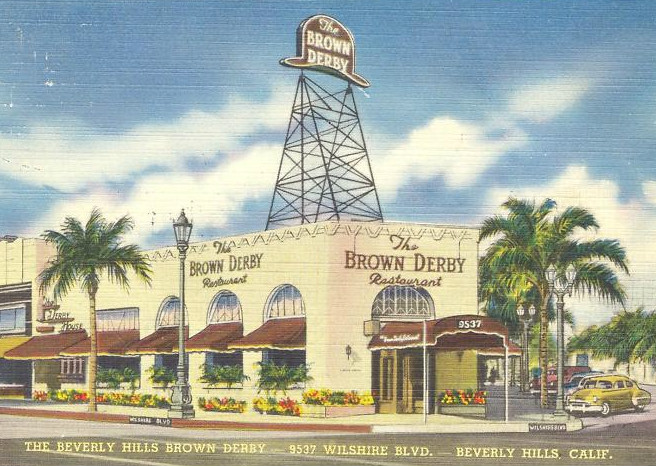
Postcard image of the 9537 Wilshire Boulevard restaurant

Bob Cobb opened the third Brown Derby in 1931 at 9537 Wilshire Boulevard in Beverly Hills, across from the Beverly Wilshire Hotel. The building had previously housed a women's clothing store called "The Petite Shop." One of the dining areas was called The American Room and featured charcoal portraits of Academy Award-winning actors by artist Nicholas Volpe on the walls. The Beverly Hills Brown Derby featured a revolving door (the first in Beverly Hills) and a uniformed doorman. A 1938 expansion with a bar and private dining room was called "The Derby House" and was decorated in Old English style. It was closed in 1982 and demolished shortly afterwards. Developer Douglas Stitzel purchased the vacant property in 1986 to build the One Rodeo shopping development.

== Los Feliz Brown Derby ==
The building that formerly housed the Los Feliz Brown Derby at 4500 Los Feliz Boulevard has been in use as a restaurant since the 1920s. Film mogul Cecil B. DeMille, a part owner of the Wilshire Blvd. restaurant, bought the building, a former chicken restaurant named Willard's, and converted it into a Brown Derby in 1940. It uniquely combined a formal restaurant with a dramatic domed ceiling with a more casual drive-in cafe outside.

=== Subsequent uses ===
In 1960, it was purchased by actor Michael St. Angel (aka Steve Flagg) and became Michaels of Los Feliz, and in 1992 it was transformed by new owners Tony and Tammi Gower into a nightclub known as The Derby. In the late 1990s, it became one of the centers of the resurgence of swing dancing, which launched the careers of modern swing bands such as Big Bad Voodoo Daddy and Johnny Crawford. Oregon rock/swing/ska band the Cherry Poppin' Daddies recorded a song that cites the venue, titled "Brown Derby Jump", on their album Zoot Suit Riot.

The Derby was prominently featured in the 1996 film Swingers, in the scene where Jon Favreau and Vince Vaughn's characters bypass the line at the front door, enter through the service entrance, walk through the kitchen, and into the club where Big Bad Voodoo Daddy are playing on the stage, in an ode to the classic restaurant scene with Ray Liotta in Scorsese's Goodfellas.

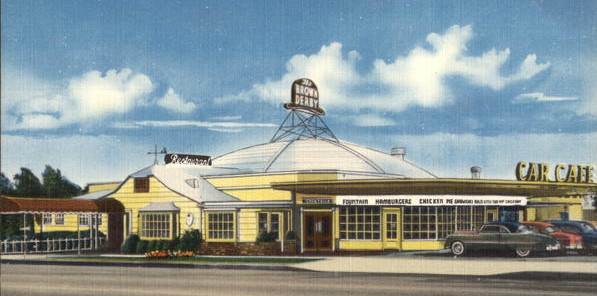
Los Feliz Boulevard Brown Derby postcard circa 1940s–1950s

In June 2004, when Hillhurst/Los Feliz LLC purchased The Derby and adjacent lots with a view to demolition and replacement by a condominium complex, the planned redevelopment became a cause célèbre for historic preservation activists. An independent coalition called "Save The Derby" fought to prevent the demolition, and, on May 19, 2006, the Los Angeles City Council voted unanimously to designate the entire structure an official Historic Cultural Monument of the City of Los Angeles.

In January 2009, the nightclub closed its doors. The current landlord chose not to renew the lease, not long after a shooting inside the club. In 2012, the Los Feliz Brown Derby space is occupied by the gastropub Mess Hall Kitchen and a Chase bank, dividing the dome in half between the businesses. The interior framing details of the dome construction have been exposed and are now visible from inside the restaurant.

== Brown Derby Crenshaw Center ==
A fifth Brown Derby opened in 1955 at the Broadway Crenshaw Shopping Center, now known as the Baldwin Hills Crenshaw Plaza, in the Baldwin Hills neighborhood of Los Angeles. It was a 24-hour coffee shop designed by architect Rowland Crawford and located near the center's Desmond's men's store The address was 3625 Stocker Avenue, Los Angeles, California. The location later became an early location of The International House of Pancakes

== Licensing program ==
The Brown Derby began a licensing program in 1987, with an agreement with The Walt Disney Company for a replica of the original Hollywood Brown Derby restaurant at the new Disney-MGM Studios in Lake Buena Vista, Florida. In 1990, the Walt Disney Company entered into three additional agreements for the Walt Disney Movie Studios at Disneyland Resort Paris, Tokyo Disney Sea at Tokyo Disney Resort and Disney California Adventure Park at Disneyland Resort in Anaheim, California. In 1996, a ten-year agreement was entered into with MGM Grand Las Vegas Las Vegas, Nevada; in 1998, the MGM Grand Detroit, Michigan temporary facility was added.

== In popular culture ==
- Hollywood Hotel – Hollywood Brown Derby
- Stand-In – Wilshire Boulevard Brown Derby
- Dragnet – 1987 film, the Wilshire Boulevard location
- Ed Wood – the titular film director is shown hosting fundraising parties at the Wilshire Brown Derby; as the restaurant had since closed, shots featuring the exterior of the restaurant were filmed using a recreation built on the grounds of the Ambassador Hotel, opposite the remains of the actual location.
- Chinatown – 1974 film, shot at the restaurant The Windsor set-dressed as The Brown Derby.
- Dawn of the Dead – 1978 film shot at the Monroeville Mall, Pennsylvania. A Brown Derby can be seen in the background of multiple shots throughout the film.
- Swingers – 1996, filmed partly at the Los Feliz Derby

== See also ==
- Chasen's
- Perino's

== Bibliography ==
- Alleman, Richard (1985). The Movie Lover's Guide to Hollywood. HarperCollins. ISBN 0-06-091262-6.
- Geary, George (2016). L.A.'s Legendary Restaurants. Santa Monica Press. ISBN 9781595800893.
- Willems, Mark (1996). The Brown Derby Restaurant: A Hollywood Legend. Rizzoli. ISBN 0847819256 – via Google Books.
