= You Can't Believe Everything =

1918 film

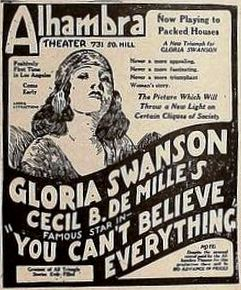
- Advert for film
- Directed by: Jack Conway
- Written by: Norman Sherbrook
- Starring: Gloria Swanson
- Cinematography: Elgin Lessley
- Distributed by: Triangle Film Corporation
- Release date: June 23, 1918
- Running time: 5 reels
- Country: United States
- Language: Silent (English intertitles)

You Can't Believe Everything is a 1918 American silent drama film directed by Jack Conway and starring Gloria Swanson. It is not known whether the film currently survives, and it is likely to be a lost film.

== Plot ==
As described in a film magazine, Jim Wheeler (Peil), believing himself hopelessly crippled, stifles his love for Patricia Reynolds (Swanson), the belle of society's favorite summer colony. A number of thoughtless flirtations have resulted in a few of the young men falling desperately in love with her. One of these attempts to force his love on her, but she leaps from his automobile. On the way back to the hotel she rescues Jim from drowning, the method he had chosen to end his life. She promises to keep his secret and, when accused of being in a roadhouse by the social leaders, she is unable to explain her whereabouts on the night in question. To protect her name, Haston Carson (Richardson) says that she was with him. In the meantime Jim has left with a medical specialist, to be cured or killed. He returns a well man just in time to save Patricia from social ostracism from her supposed indiscretions.

== Cast ==
- Gloria Swanson as Patricia Reynolds
- Darrell Foss as Arthur Kirby
- Jack Richardson as Hasty Carson
- Edward Peil Sr. as Jim Wheeler
- George Hernandez as Henry Pettit
- Iris Ashton as Amy Powellson
- James R. Cope as Club Danforth
- Claire McDowell as Grace Dardley
- Grover Franke as Ferdinand Thatcher
- Kitty Bradbury as Mrs. Powellson
- Bliss Chevalier as Mrs. Morton Danforth

== Reception ==
Like many American films of the time, You Can't Believe Everything was subject to cuts by city and state film censorship boards. For example, the Chicago Board of Censors cut, in Reel 1, view of young woman in low-cut gown after emerging from the water, Reel 2, closeup of man looking at young woman in low-cut gown, first two scenes of Kirby and young woman talking together and she is in low-cut gown, Reel 3, young woman taking off wet undergarments before fire, Reel 4, two scenes of Hasty letting sail down, the three intertitles "We can't stay here all night", "Why not, aren't you comfortable", and "You're mine, Pat, all mine", and first struggle scene.
