= Her Decision =

1918 film

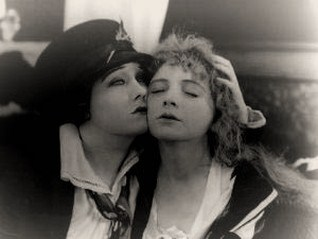
- Still with Gloria Swanson and Ann Forrest
- Directed by: Jack Conway
- Written by: Charles Jurlson
- Story by: Laura Gannet
- Starring: Gloria Swanson
- Cinematography: Elgin Lessley
- Distributed by: Triangle Film Corporation
- Release date: May 2, 1918
- Running time: 5 reels
- Country: United States
- Language: Silent (English intertitles)

Her Decision is a 1918 American silent drama film directed by Jack Conway and starring Gloria Swanson. It is not known whether the film currently survives, and it may be a lost film.

== Plot ==
As described in a film magazine, after her sister Inah (Forrest) is betrayed by a dissolute young millionaire, Phyllis Dunbar (Swanson) seeks the aid of her fiance Bobbie Warner (Foss), but is refused. In desperation she turns to Martin Rankin (Sherry), her employer, who previously had proposed to her but had been refused, with an offer of marriage if he will see her sister through her trouble. Martin finally agrees and the ceremony is performed. Martin assures his young bride that they will live together for one year as pals, and if he does not win her love in that time he will give her the freedom to marry Bobbie. After a visit to a dance hall by Bobbie dispels any remaining love between the two, Phyllis returns to her home and gives her love freely to Martin.

== Cast ==
- Gloria Swanson as Phyllis Dunbar
- J. Barney Sherry as Martin Rankin
- Darrell Foss as Bobbie Warner
- Ann Forrest as Inah Dunbar (credited as Ann Kroman)

== Reception ==
Like many American films of the time, Her Decision was subject to cuts and restrictions by city and state film censorship boards. For example, the Chicago Board of Censors issued an Adults Only permit for the film.
