= Gloria Swanson =

American actress (1899–1983)

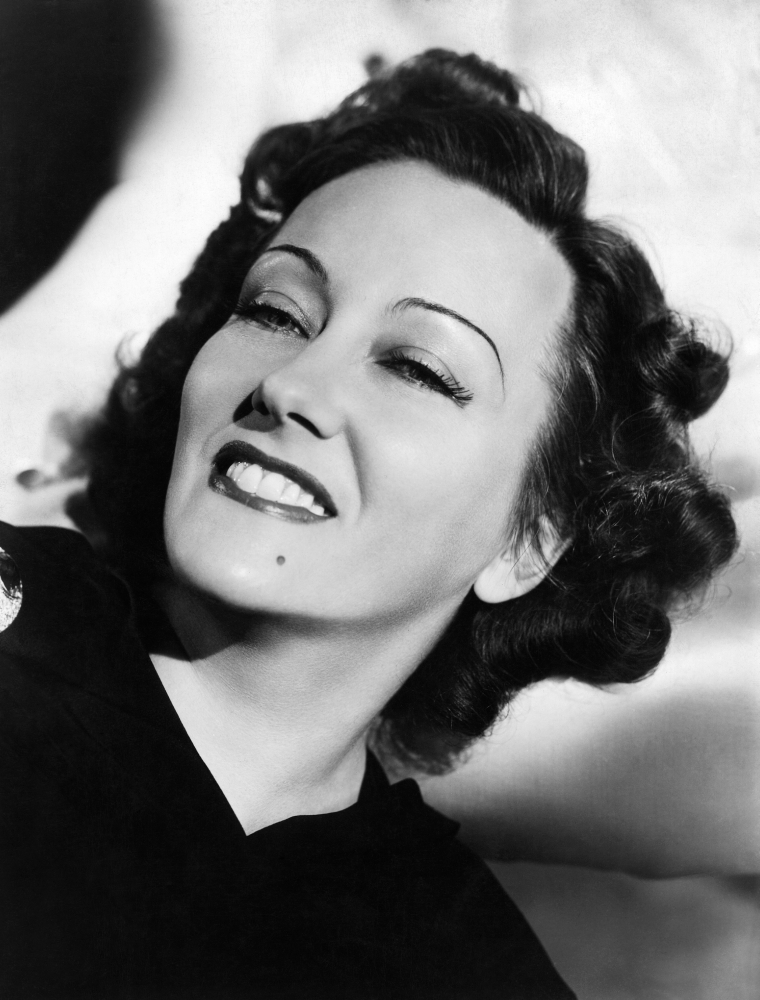
- Swanson in 1941
- Born: Gloria May Josephine Swanson; March 27, 1899; Chicago, Illinois, U.S.
- Died: April 4, 1983 (aged 84); New York City, U.S.
- Resting place: Church of the Heavenly Rest, New York City
- Other name: Gloria Mae
- Occupations: Actress; producer; writer
- Years active: 1914–1983
- Political party: Republican
- Spouses: Wallace Beery (m. 1916; div. 1918) Herbert K. Somborn (m. 1919; div. 1922) Henry de La Falaise (m. 1925; div. 1931) Michael Farmer (m. 1931; div. 1934) William Davey (m. 1945; div. 1946) William Dufty (m. 1976)
- Children: 3

Gloria Mae Josephine Swanson (March 27, 1899 – April 4, 1983) was an American actress. She first achieved fame acting in dozens of silent films in the 1920s and was nominated three times for the Academy Award for Best Actress, most famously for her 1950 turn in Billy Wilder's Sunset Boulevard, which also earned her a Golden Globe Award.

Swanson was born in Chicago and raised in a military family that moved from base to base. Her infatuation with Essanay Studios actor Francis X. Bushman led to her aunt taking her to tour the actor's Chicago studio. The 15-year-old Swanson was offered a brief walk-on for one film and eventually a stock-players contract, beginning her life's career in front of the cameras. Swanson left school, and was soon hired to work in California for Mack Sennett's Keystone Studios comedy shorts opposite Bobby Vernon.

She was eventually recruited by Famous Players–Lasky/Paramount Pictures, where she was put under contract for seven years and became a global superstar. She starred in a series of films about society, directed by Cecil B. DeMille, including Male and Female (1919). She continued as a successful movie star in The Affairs of Anatol (1921) and Beyond the Rocks (1922). She also starred in critically acclaimed performances such as Zaza (1923) and Madame Sans-Gêne (1925).

In 1925, Swanson joined United Artists as one of the film industry's pioneering women filmmakers. She produced and starred in the 1928 film Sadie Thompson, earning a nomination for Best Actress at the first annual Academy Awards. Her sound film debut performance in 1929's The Trespasser earned her a second Academy Award nomination. Queen Kelly (1928–29) was a box-office disaster, but is remembered as a silent classic. After almost two decades in front of the cameras, her film success waned during the 1930s. Swanson received renewed praise for her return to the screen in her role as Norma Desmond in Sunset Boulevard. She made only three more films, but guest-starred on several television shows, and acted in road productions of stage plays.

== Early life ==
Swanson was born in a small house in Chicago in 1899, the only child of Adelaide (née Klanowski) and Joseph Theodore Swanson (né Svensson), a soldier. She was raised in the Lutheran faith. Her father was a Swedish American and her mother was of German, English, French, and Polish ancestry. Because of her father's attachment to the U.S. Army, the family moved frequently. She spent some of her childhood in Key West, Florida, where she was enrolled in a Catholic convent school, and in Puerto Rico, where she saw her first motion pictures.

== Career ==
=== 1914–1918: Essanay/Keystone/Triangle ===
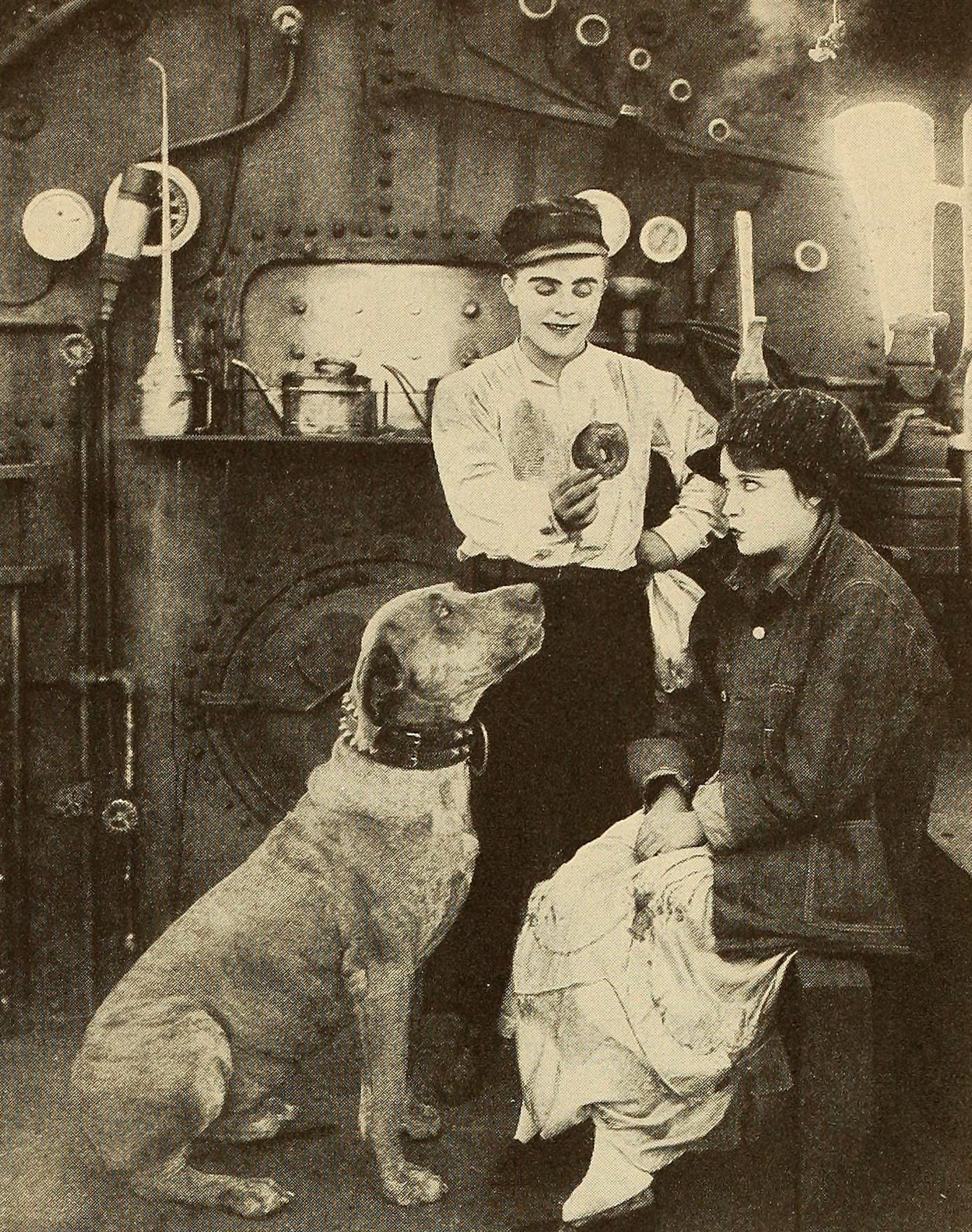
Bobby Vernon with Swanson and Teddy the Dog in Teddy at the Throttle (1917)

Her family once again residing in Chicago, the adolescent Gloria developed a crush on actor Francis X. Bushman and knew he was employed by Essanay Studios in the city. Swanson later recalled that her Aunt Inga brought her at the age of 15 to visit Bushman's studio, where she was discovered by a tour guide. Other accounts have the star-struck Swanson herself talking her way into the business. In either version, she was soon hired as an extra.

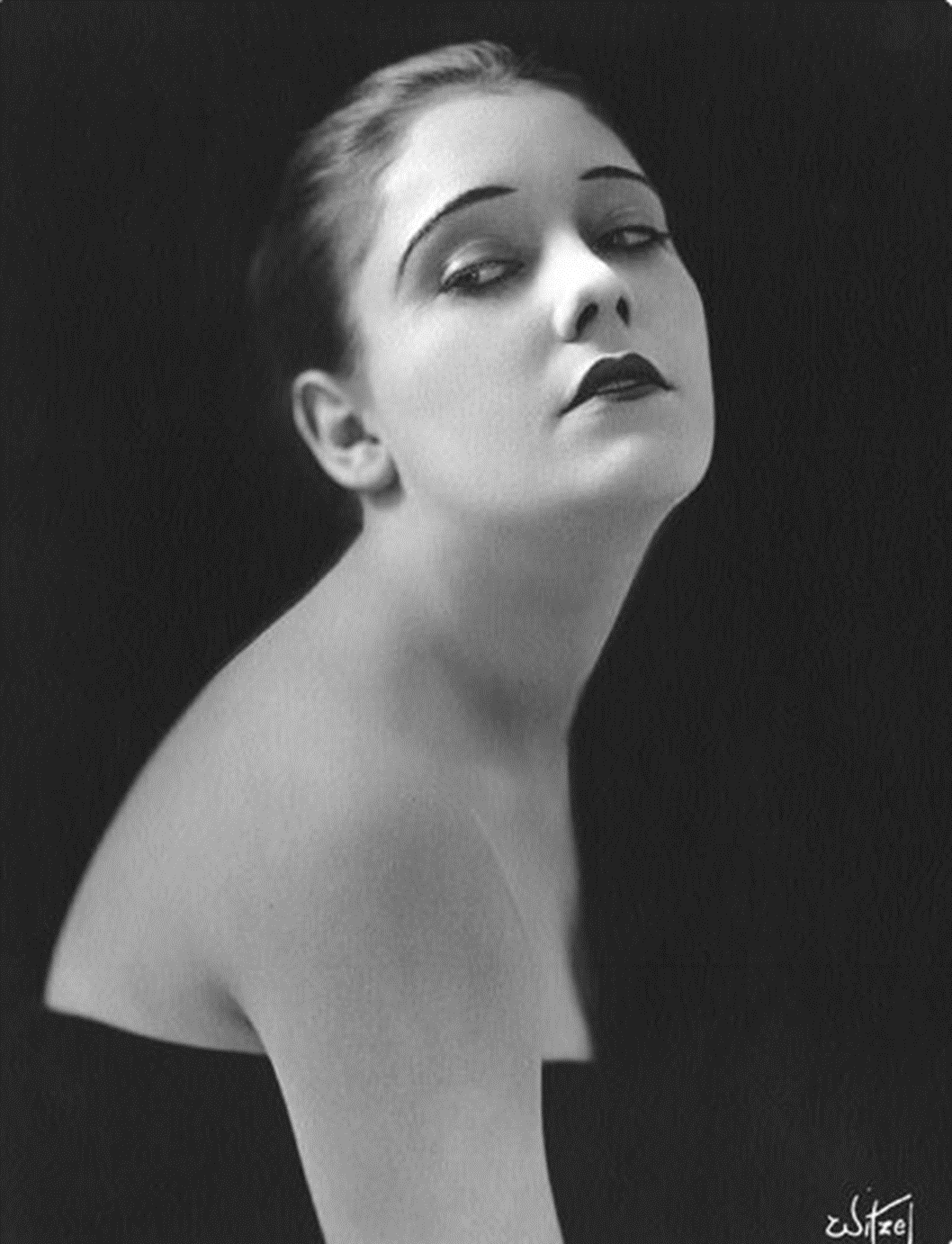
Swanson in 1917

The movie industry was still in its infancy, churning out short subjects, without the advantage of today's casting agencies and talent agents promoting their latest find. A willing extra was often a valuable asset. Her first role was a brief walk-on with actress Gerda Holmes, that paid an enormous (in those days) $3.25. The studio soon offered her steady work at $13.25 (equivalent to $426 in 2025) per week. Swanson left school to work full-time at the studio. In 1915, she co-starred in Sweedie Goes to College with her future first husband Wallace Beery.

Swanson's mother accompanied her to California in 1916 for her roles in Mack Sennett's Keystone Studios comedy shorts opposite Bobby Vernon and directed by Clarence G. Badger. They were met at the train station by Beery, who was pursuing his own career ambitions at Keystone. Vernon and Swanson projected a great screen chemistry that proved popular with audiences. Director Charley Chase recalled that Swanson was "frightened to death" of Vernon's dangerous stunts. Surviving movies in which they appear together include The Danger Girl (1916), The Sultan's Wife (1917), and Teddy at the Throttle (1917). Badger was sufficiently impressed by Swanson to recommend her to the director Jack Conway for Her Decision and You Can't Believe Everything in 1918. Triangle had never put Swanson under contract, but did increase her pay to $15 a week. When she was approached by Famous Players–Lasky to work for Cecil B. DeMille, the resulting legal dispute obligated her to Triangle for several more months. Soon afterward, Triangle was in a financial bind and loaned Swanson to DeMille for the comedy Don't Change Your Husband.

=== 1919–1926: Famous Players–Lasky/Paramount Pictures ===
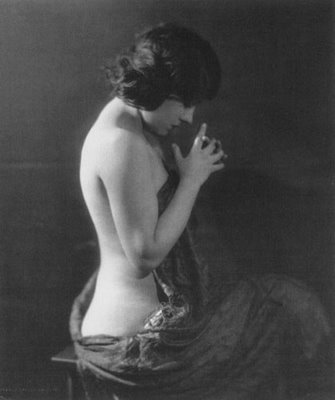
Swanson photographed by Alfred Cheney Johnston (1919)

At the behest of DeMille, Swanson signed a contract with Famous Players–Lasky on December 30, 1918, for $150 a week, to be raised to $200 a week, and eventually $350 a week. Her first picture under her new contract was DeMille's World War I romantic drama For Better, for Worse. She made six pictures under the direction of DeMille, including Male and Female (1919), in which she posed with a lion as "Lion's Bride". While she and her father were dining out one evening, the man who would become her second husband, Equity Pictures president Herbert K. Somborn, introduced himself, by inviting her to meet one of her personal idols, actress Clara Kimball Young.

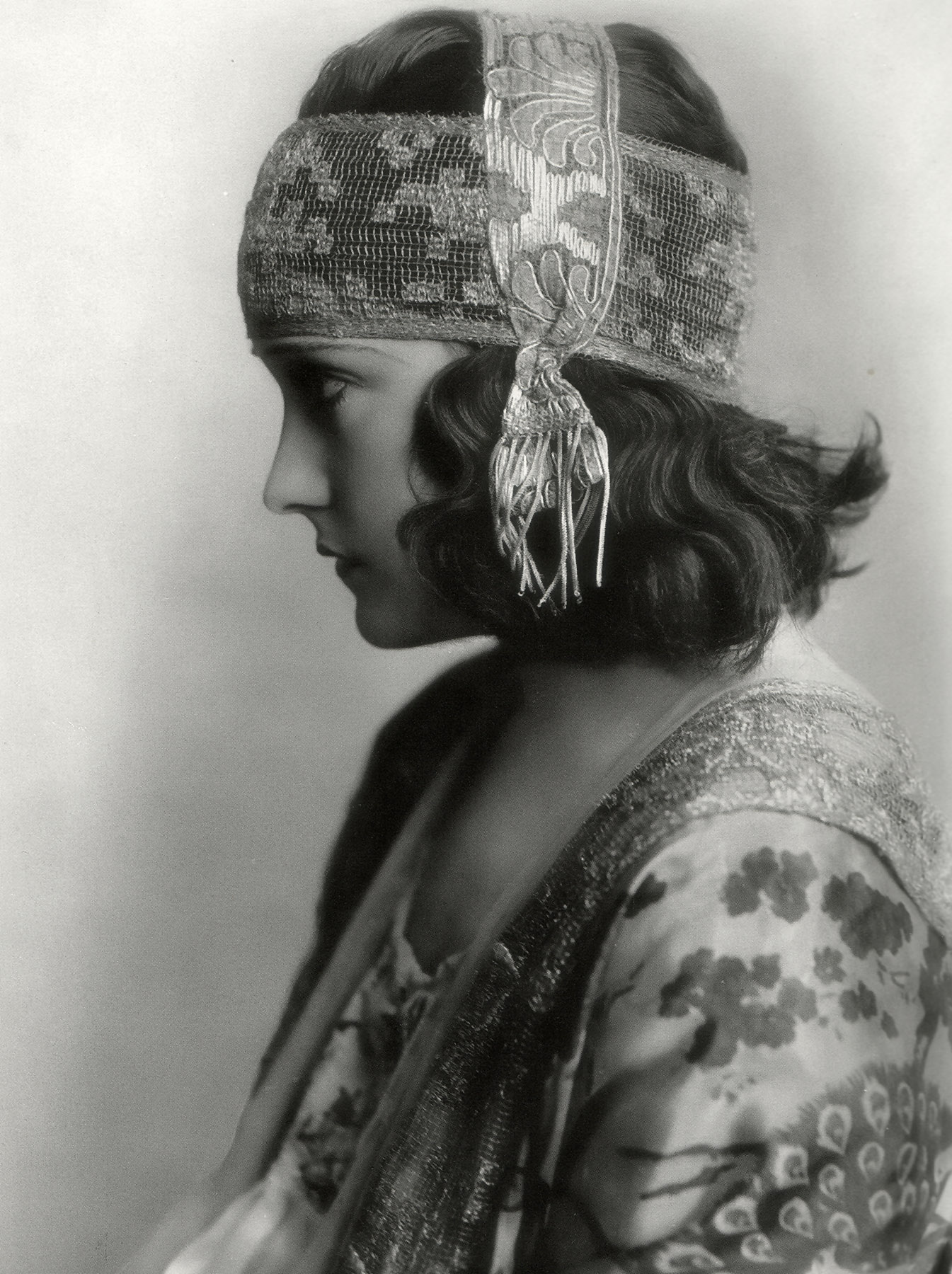
Swanson in a production still for Why Change Your Wife? (1920)

Why Change Your Wife?, Something to Think About (both 1920), and The Affairs of Anatol (1921) soon followed. She next appeared in 10 films directed by Sam Wood, starting with The Great Moment (1921) and including Beyond the Rocks in 1922 with her longtime friend Rudolph Valentino. Valentino had become a star in 1921 for his appearance in The Four Horsemen of the Apocalypse, but Swanson had known him since his days as an aspiring actor getting small parts, with no apparent hope for his professional future. She was impressed by his shy, well-mannered personality, the complete opposite of what his public image would become.

After her films with Wood, she appeared in Zaza (1923) directed by Allan Dwan. During her time at Famous Players–Lasky, seven more of her films were directed by Dwan.

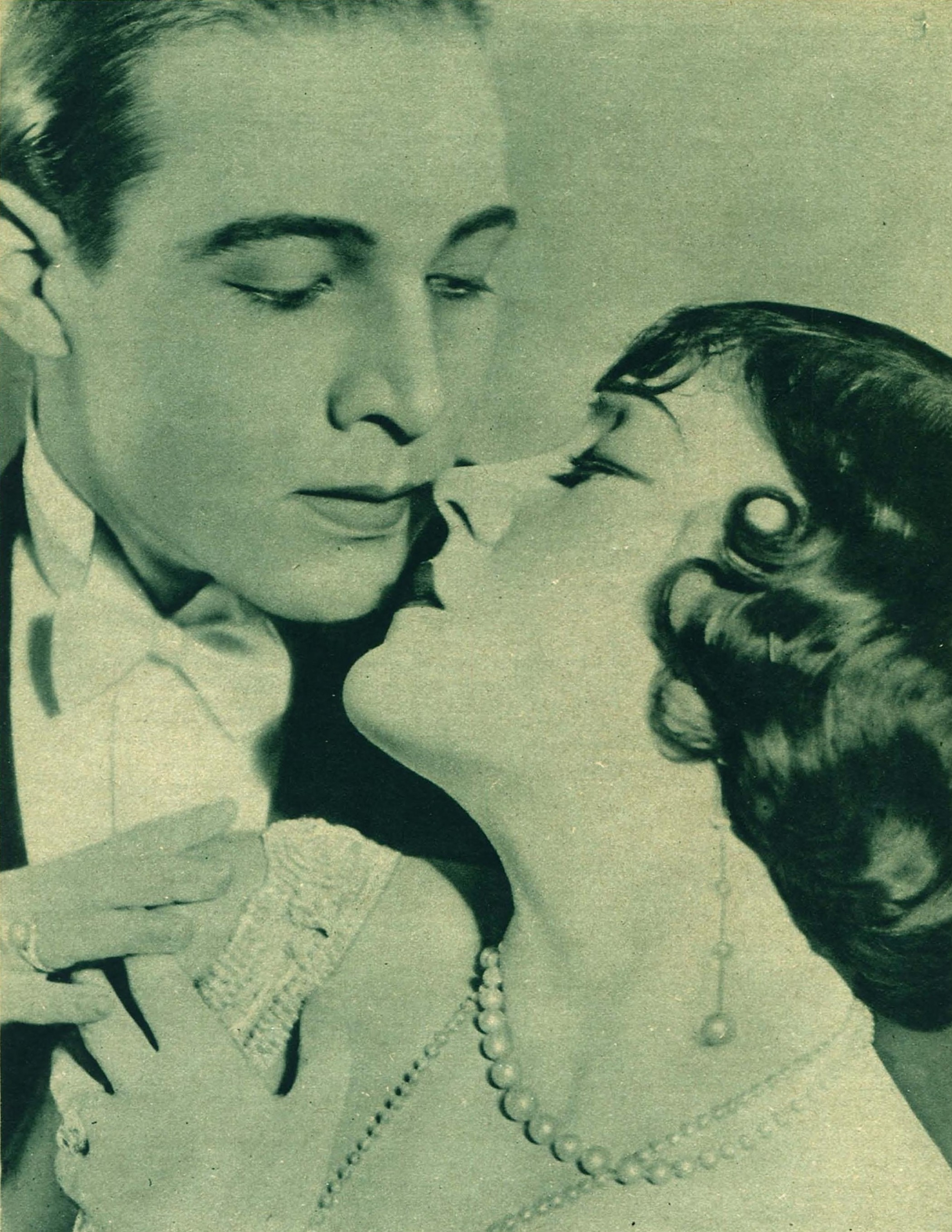
Swanson and Rudolph Valentino in Beyond the Rocks (1922)

In 1925, Swanson starred in the French-American comedy Madame Sans-Gêne, directed by Léonce Perret. Filming was allowed for the first time at many of the historic sites relating to Napoleon. While it was well received at the time, no prints are known to exist and it is considered to be a lost film. Swanson appeared in a 1925 short produced by Lee de Forest in his Phonofilm sound-on-film process. She made a number of films for Paramount, including The Coast of Folly (1925), Stage Struck (1925) and The Untamed Lady (1926). Before she could produce films with United Artists, she completed Fine Manners with Paramount and turned down an offer to make The King of Kings with DeMille.

=== 1925–1933: United Artists ===
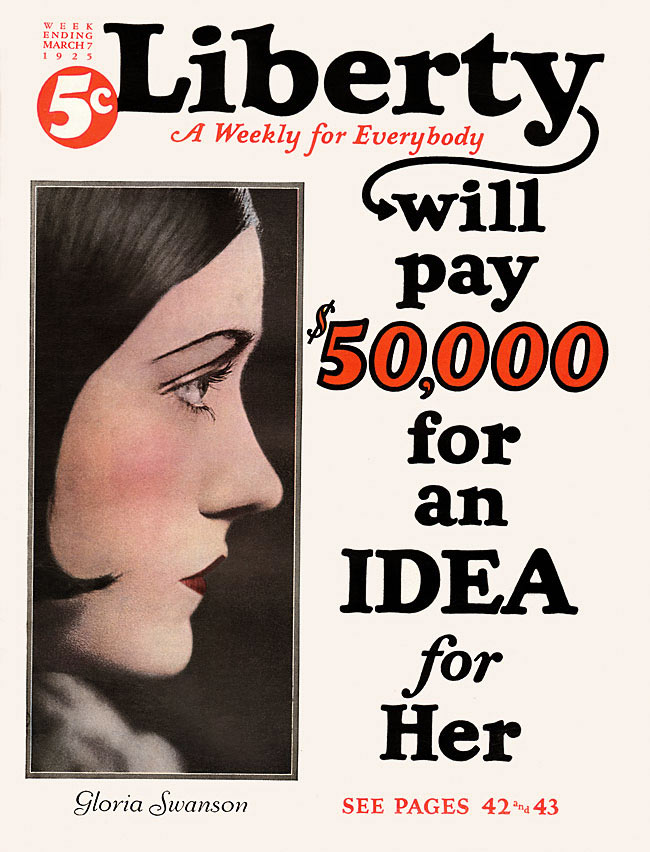
Swanson on the March 7, 1925, cover of Liberty magazine

She turned down a one-million-dollar-a-year (equivalent to $18,500,000 in 2025) contract with Paramount in favor of joining the newly created United Artists partnership on June 25, 1925, accepting a six-picture distribution offer from president Joseph Schenck. At the time, Swanson was considered the most bankable star of her era. United Artists had its own Art Cinema Corporation subsidiary to advance financial loans for the productions of individual partners. The partnership agreement included her commitment to a buy-in of $100,000 of preferred stock subscription.

==== Swanson Producing Corporation ====
The Swanson Producing Corporation was set up as the umbrella organization for her agreement with United Artists. Under that name, she produced The Love of Sunya with herself in the title role. The film, co-starring John Boles, was directed by Albert Parker, based on the play The Eyes of Youth by Max Marcin and Charles Guernon. The production was a disaster, with Parker being indecisive and the actors not experienced enough to deliver the performances he wanted. The film fell behind in its schedule and, by the time of its release, the end product had not lived up to Swanson's expectations. While it did not lose money, it was a financial wash, breaking even on the production costs.

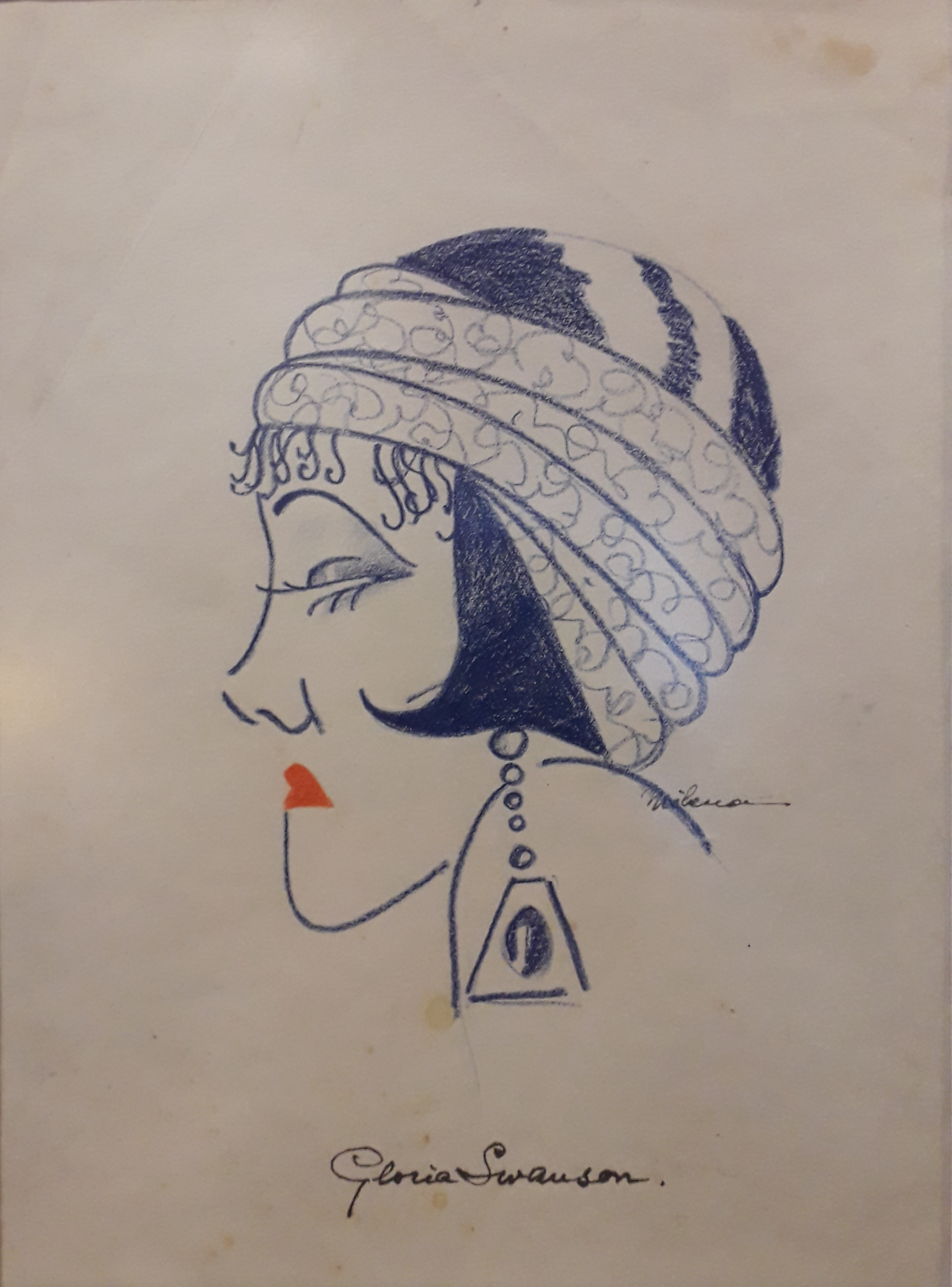
Portrait of Gloria Swanson by Milena Pavlović-Barili

==== Gloria Swanson Productions ====
She engaged the services of director Raoul Walsh in 1927 and together they conceived of making a film based on W. Somerset Maugham's short story "Miss Thompson". Gloria Swanson Productions proposed to film the controversial Sadie Thompson about the travails of a prostitute living in American Samoa, a project that initially pleased United Artists president Joseph Schenck. As she moved forward with the project, association members urged Schenck to halt the production due to its subject matter. The members took further steps by registering their discontent with Will H. Hays, Chairman of the Motion Picture Producers and Distributors of America. Walsh previously had his own battles with the Hays office, having managed to skirt around censorship issues with What Price Glory? By bringing him to the table, literally over breakfast in her home, Hays and Swanson developed a working relationship for the film. Hays was enthusiastic about the basic story, but did have specific issues that were dealt with before the film's release. The project was filmed on Santa Catalina Island, just off the coast of Long Beach, California. Gross receipts slightly exceeded $850,000 (equivalent to $15,800,000 in 2025). At the first annual Academy Awards, Swanson received a nomination for Best Actress for her performance, and the film's cinematographer George Barnes was also nominated.

==== Gloria Productions ====
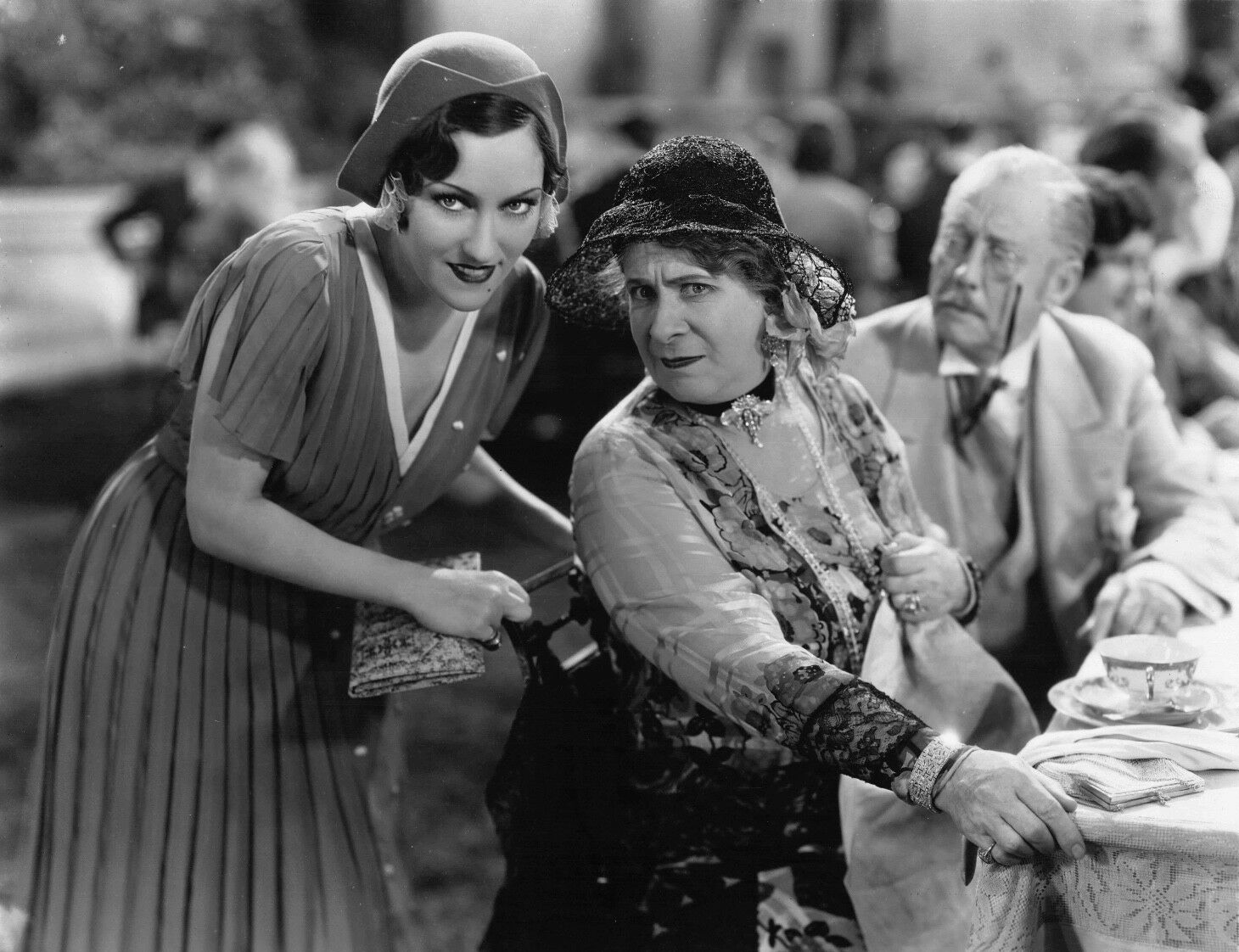
Swanson (left) in Indiscreet (1931)

By the end of 1927, Swanson was in dire financial straits, with only $65 in the bank. Her two productions had generated income, but too slowly to offset her production loan debts to Art Cinema Corporation. Swanson had also not made good on her $100,000 subscription for preferred United Artists shared stock. She had received financial proposals from United Artists studio head Joseph Schenck, as well as from Bank of America, prior to engaging the services of Joseph P. Kennedy Sr. as her financial advisor. He proposed to personally bankroll her next picture and conducted a thorough examination of her financial records. Kennedy advised her to shut down Swanson Producing Corporation. She agreed to his plan for a fresh start under the dummy corporate name of Gloria Productions, headquartered in Delaware. Upon his advice, she fired most of her staff and sold her rights for The Love of Sunya and Sadie Thompson to Art Cinema Corporation. Kennedy then created the position of "European director of Pathé" to put her third husband Henry de La Falaise on the payroll.

Sound films were already becoming popular with audiences, most notably the films of singer Al Jolson, who had success with The Jazz Singer released in 1927 and The Singing Fool in 1928. Kennedy, however, advised her to hire Erich von Stroheim to direct another silent film, The Swamp, subsequently retitled Queen Kelly. She was hesitant to hire Stroheim, who was known for being difficult to deal with and who was unwilling to work within any budget. Kennedy, nevertheless, was insistent and was able to get Stroheim released from contractual obligations to producer Pat Powers. Stroheim worked for several months on writing the basic script. Filming of Queen Kelly began in November. His filming was slow, albeit meticulous, and the cast and crew suffered from long hours. Shooting was shut down in January, and Stroheim fired, after complaints by Swanson about him and about the general direction the film was taking. Swanson and Kennedy tried to salvage it with an alternative ending shot on November 24, 1931, directed by Swanson and photographed by Gregg Toland.

Only two other films were made under Gloria Productions. The Trespasser in 1929 was a sound production, and garnered Swanson her second Oscar nomination. Written by Edmund Goulding, with Laura Hope Crews fine-tuning the dialogue, Kennedy approved funding for the go-ahead on the production. The film was a melodrama, complete with musical numbers sung by Swanson and completed in 21 days. The world premiere was held in London, the first American sound production to do so. Swanson was mobbed by adoring fans. Before leaving London, she sang at a concert carried over the BBC. What a Widow! in 1930 was the final film for Gloria Productions.

==== United Artists stars on the radio ====
Mary Pickford and her husband Douglas Fairbanks hosted the March 29, 1928, episode of the Dodge Hour radio program, originating from Pickford's private bungalow at United Artists, and broadcast to audiences in American movie theaters. The brainchild of Joseph Schenck, it was a promotional come-on to attract audiences into movie theaters to hear the voices of their favorite actors, as sound productions became the future of commercial films. On hand were Swanson, Charlie Chaplin, Norma Talmadge, John Barrymore, Dolores del Río, and D. W. Griffith.

==== Gloria Swanson British Productions Ltd. ====
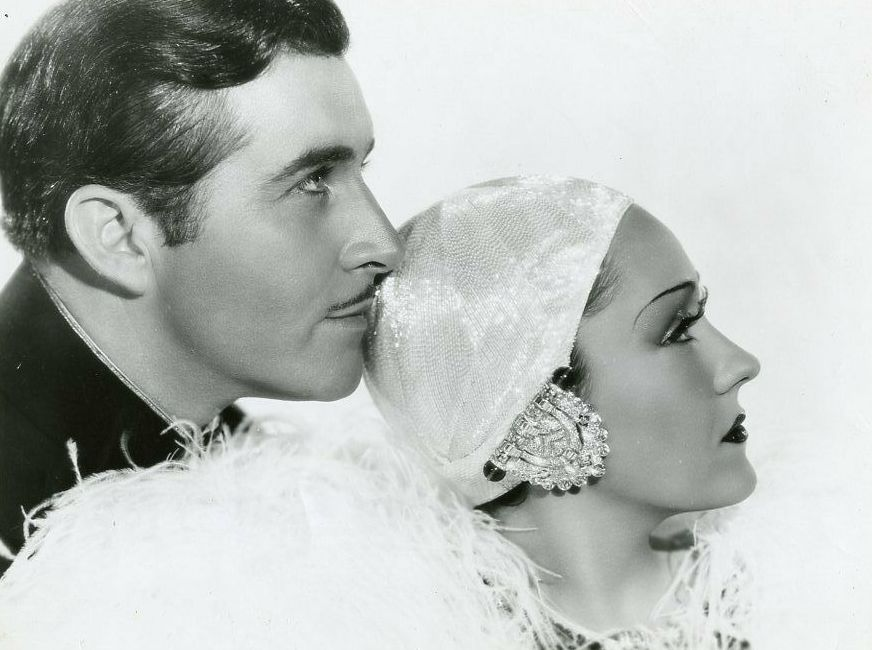
Swanson and John Boles in Music in the Air (1934)

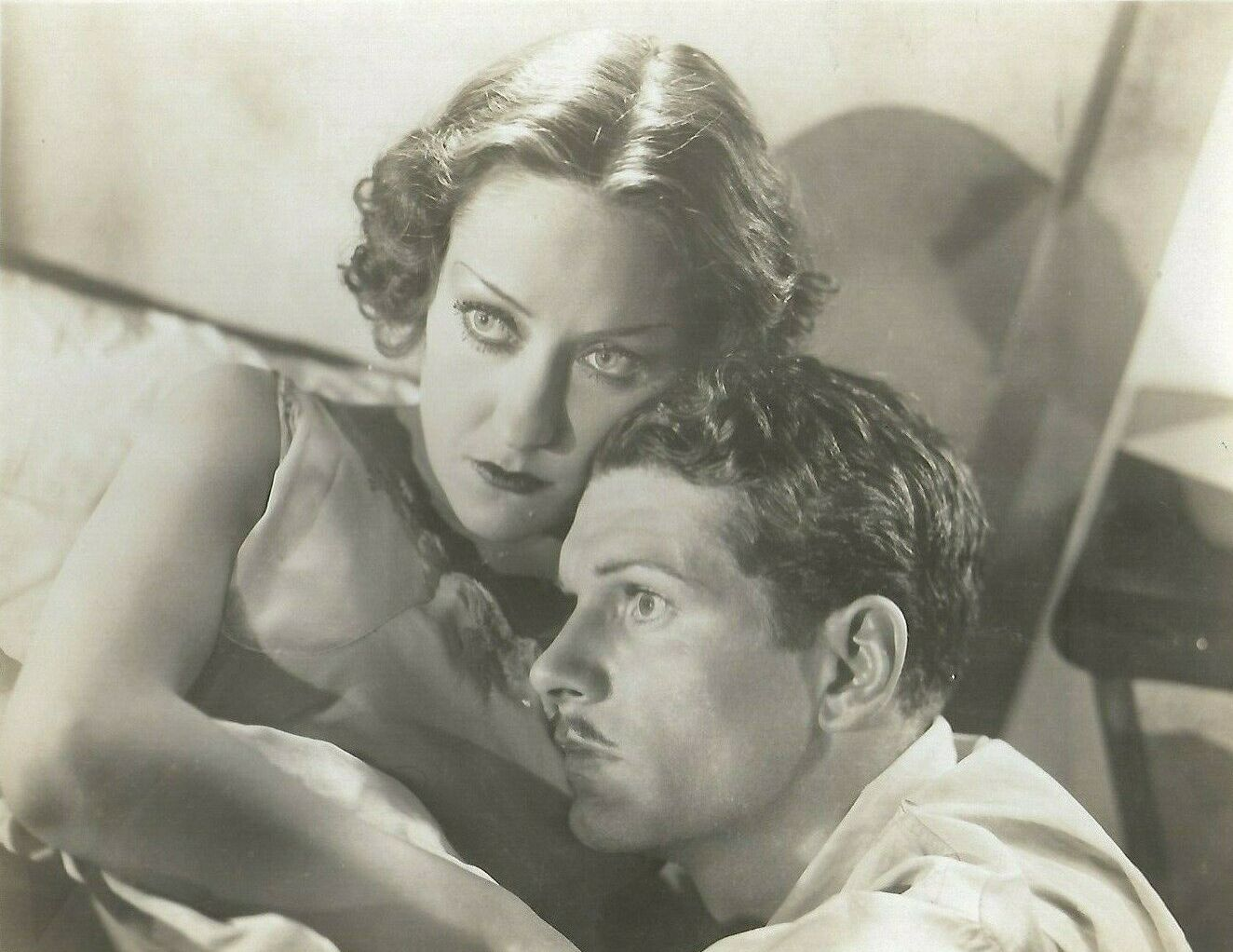
Swanson and Laurence Olivier in Perfect Understanding (1933)

Before she began filming Perfect Understanding as Gloria Swanson British Productions Ltd., she finished a two-film package production for Art Cinema, which included Indiscreet and Tonight or Never (1931). Perfect Understanding, a 1933 sound production comedy, was the only film produced by this company. Made entirely at Ealing Studios, it co-starred Laurence Olivier as Swanson's on-screen husband. United Artists bought back all of her stock with them, in order to provide her financing to make this film, and thereby ending her relationship with the partnership. The film was panned by the critics upon its release and failed at the box office.

=== 1938–1950: Creating new paths ===
When she made the transition to sound films as her career simultaneously began to decline, Swanson moved permanently to New York City in 1938. Swanson starred in Father Takes a Wife for RKO in 1941. She began appearing in stage productions and starred in The Gloria Swanson Hour on WPIX-TV in 1948. Swanson threw herself into painting and sculpting and, in 1954, published Gloria Swanson's Diary, a general newsletter. She toured in summer stock, engaged in political activism, designed and marketed clothing and accessories, and made personal appearances on radio and in movie theaters. On July 10, 1947, she guest voiced on the CBS Suspense radio drama "Murder by the Book" portraying the lead character Emily Carlyle, an acclaimed yet trouble authoress who becomes involved in a real-life murder investigation while dealing with her own peculiar issues.

=== 1950–1977: Later career ===
==== Sunset Boulevard and final films ====
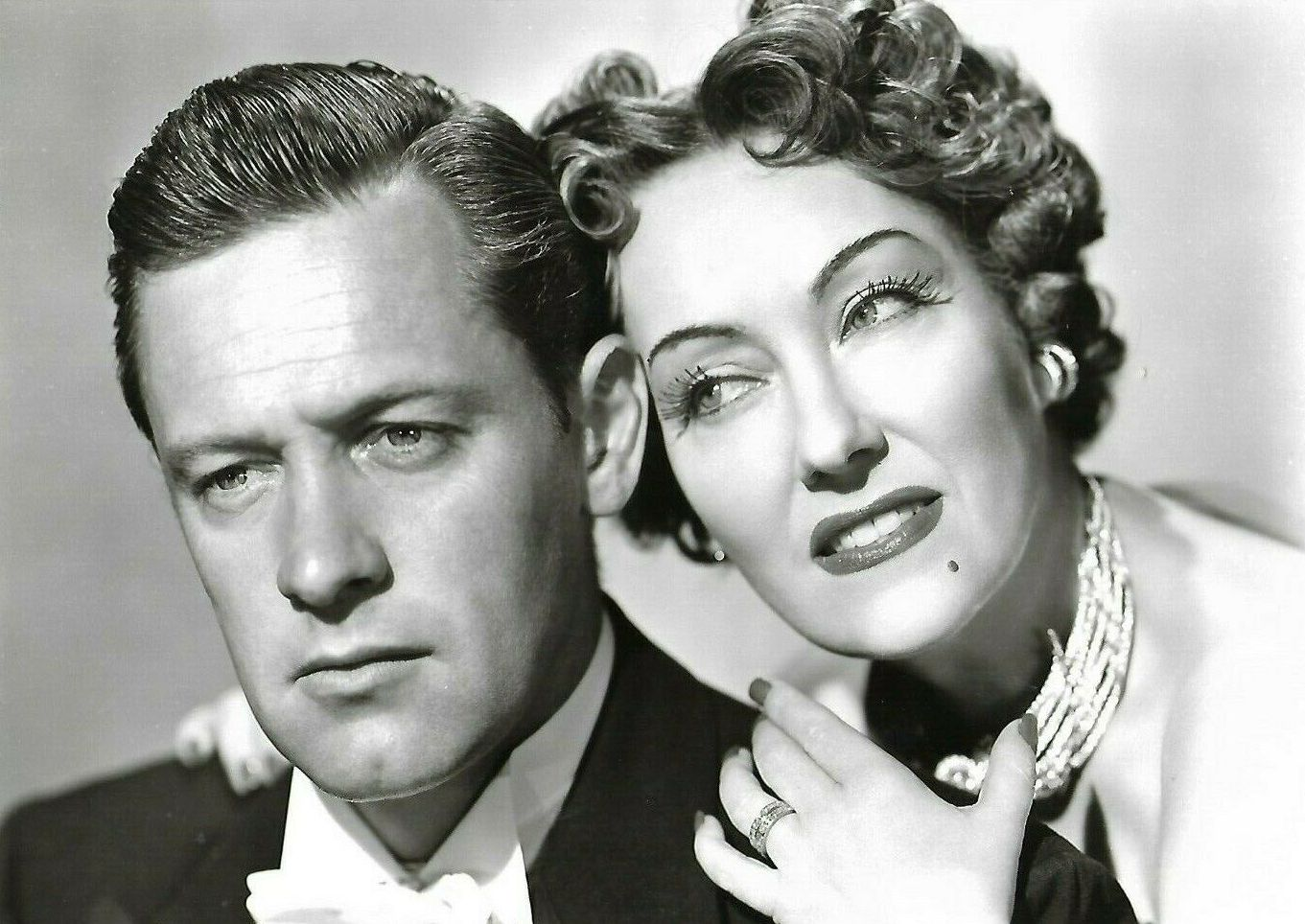
Swanson and William Holden in Sunset Boulevard (1950)

"It should be pointed out that Gloria Swanson was not Norma Desmond. Unlike her delusional screen counterpart, Swanson was fiercely realistic. She lived in the present –not in the past– and pursued many interests with passionate zeal. She was also a good actress. Judging by the number of people who think she was Norma Desmond, maybe a little too good." – Biographer Lon Davis in Silent Lives: 100 Biographies of the Silent Film Era. (2008).

The film Sunset Boulevard, about the deranged world of a once-famous silent actress, was conceived by director Billy Wilder and screenwriter Charles Brackett, and came to include writer D. M. Marshman Jr. They bandied about the name of Mae West, whose public persona even in her senior years was as a sex symbol, but she objected to playing a has-been. Mary Pickford was also considered for the lead role of Norma Desmond. It was director George Cukor who suggested Swanson, noting that she was once such a valuable asset to her studio that she was "carried in a sedan chair from her dressing room to the set".

The film follows faded silent actress Norma Desmond (Swanson), who lives in a mansion with her former-husband-director-turned-butler Max von Mayerling (Erich von Stroheim), who enables her grandiose delusions. She takes in, and subsequently falls in love with, floundering screenwriter Joe Gillis (William Holden). Desmond schemes at a career revival as Gillis grows ambivalent about their developing relationship. Desmond's dreams of a comeback are subverted, and when Gillis tries to break up with her, she kills him. In the final scene, von Mayerling coaxes an acutely psychotic Desmond toward police as reporters look on with newsreel cameras; the film ends with Desmond's exclamation, "All right, Mr. DeMille, I'm ready for my close-up."

The film's casting is heavily self-referential. In one scene, von Mayerling screens Queen Kelly for Desmond and Gillis, leading critic Roger Ebert to note that "for a moment, Swanson and von Stroheim are simply playing themselves". Desmond's bridge partners, whom Gillis refers to as "waxworks", are the silent stars Buster Keaton, H.B. Warner and Anna Q. Nilsson. Cecil B. DeMille plays himself, with the film's version of DeMille having directed Desmond at the height of her stardom, just as the real DeMille had previously directed Swanson. Although Swanson had objected to enduring a screen test for the film, she had been glad to be making much more money than she had been in television and on stage. She found the overall experience of making the movie a pleasure, and later stated, "I hated to have the picture end ... When Mr. Wilder called 'Print it!' I burst into tears..." She was nominated for a Best Actress Academy Award, but lost to Judy Holliday.

Swanson received several acting offers following the release of Sunset Boulevard, but turned most of them down, saying they tended to be pale imitations of Norma Desmond. Her last major Hollywood motion picture role was also her first color film, the poorly received 3 for Bedroom C in 1952. Nationally syndicated columnist Suzy called it "one of the worst movies ever made." In 1956, Swanson made Nero's Mistress, an Italian film shot in Rome, which starred Alberto Sordi, Vittorio de Sica and Brigitte Bardot. Her final screen appearance, in 1974, was as herself in Airport 1975.

==== Journalism ====
In the mid-1950s, while living and traveling extensively in Europe, Swanson worked as a special correspondent for United Press. Writing from her residence in Rome, she produced an internationally syndicated column covering her travels, prominent world figures, and observations on society and culture.

==== Television and theatre ====
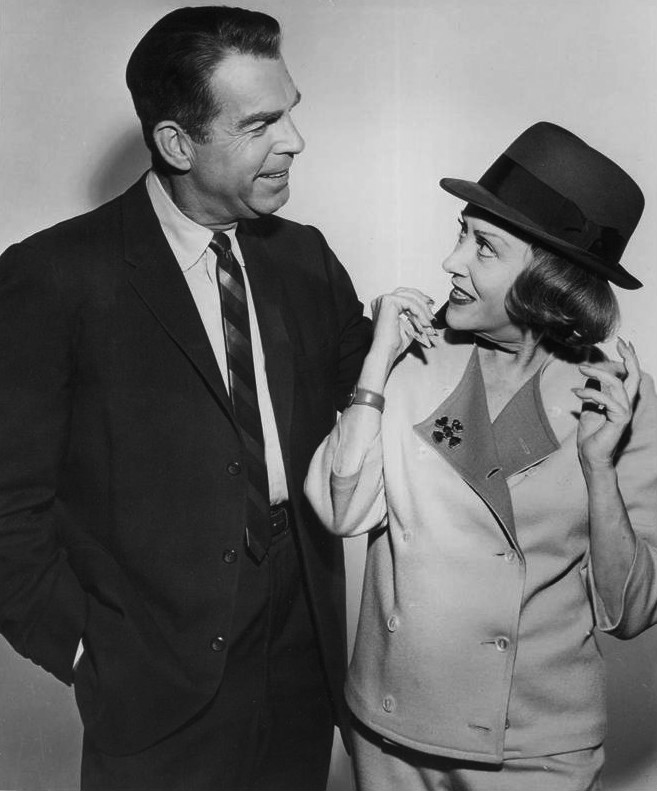
Swanson with Fred MacMurray in the promo of My Three Sons (1965)

Swanson hosted The Gloria Swanson Hour, one of the first live television series in 1948 in which she invited friends and others to be guests. Swanson later hosted Crown Theatre with Gloria Swanson, a television anthology series in which she occasionally acted.

Through the 1960s, 1970s, and early 1980s, Swanson appeared on many different talk and variety shows such as The Carol Burnett Show and The Tonight Show Starring Johnny Carson to recollect her movies and to lampoon them as well. On The Carol Burnett Show in 1973, Swanson reprised her impersonation of Charlie Chaplin from both Sunset Boulevard and Manhandled. She was the "mystery guest" on What's My Line. She acted in "Behind the Locked Door" on The Alfred Hitchcock Hour in 1964 and, in the same year, she was nominated for a Golden Globe award for her performance in Burke's Law. She made a guest appearance on The Dick Cavett Show in the summer of 1970; a guest on the same show as Janis Joplin. She made a notable appearance in a 1966 episode of The Beverly Hillbillies, in which she plays herself. In the episode, the Clampetts mistakenly believe Swanson is destitute and decide to finance a comeback movie for her – in a silent film.

After near-retirement from movies, Swanson appeared in many plays throughout her later life, beginning in the 1940s. Actor and playwright Harold J. Kennedy, who had learned the ropes at Yale and with Orson Welles' Mercury Theatre, suggested Swanson do a road tour of "Reflected Glory", a comedy that had run on the Broadway stage with Tallulah Bankhead as its star. Kennedy wrote the script for the play A Goose for the Gander, which began its road tour in Chicago in August 1944.

Swanson also toured with Let Us Be Gay. After her success with Sunset Boulevard, she starred on Broadway in a revival of Twentieth Century with José Ferrer, and in Nina with David Niven. Her last major stage role was in the 1971 Broadway production of Butterflies Are Free at the Booth Theatre. Swanson starred in the 1974 TV movie Killer Bees. Kevin Brownlow and David Gill interviewed her for the 1980 British TV series Hollywood, a history of the silent era.

== Personal life ==
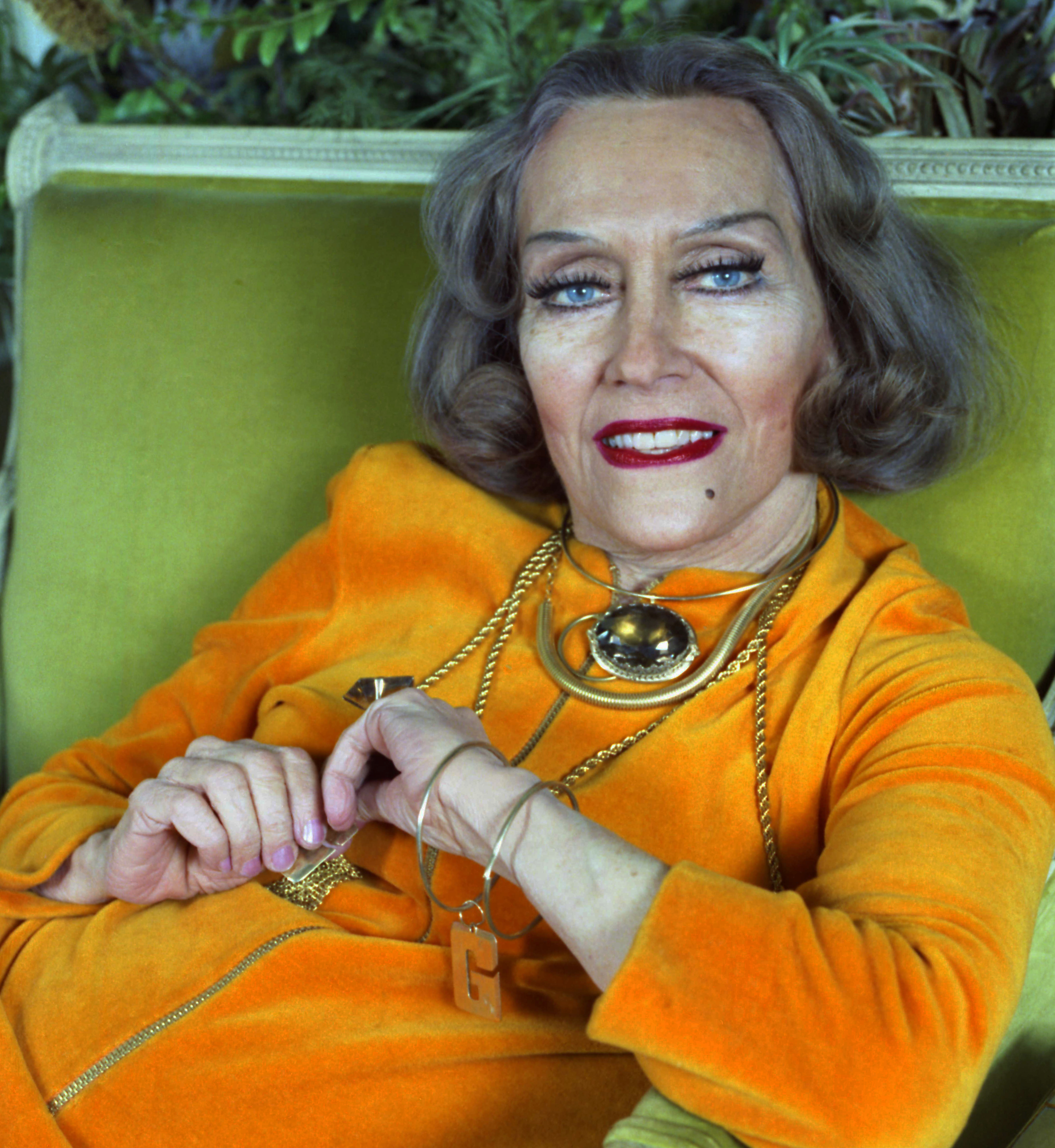
Swanson photographed by Allan Warren in her New York City apartment (1972)

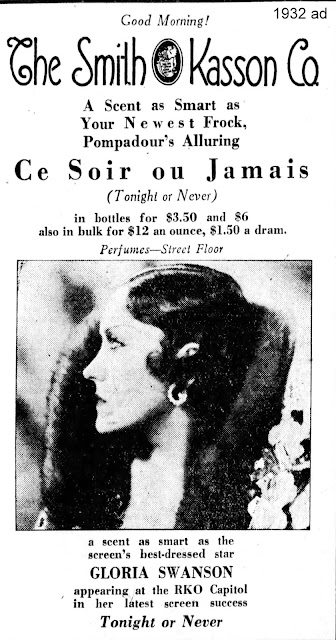
Ce soir ou Jamais, fragrance ad, 1932. The Cincinnati Enquirer.

Swanson was a vegetarian and an early health food advocate who was known for bringing her own meals to public functions in a tin box.

She was known for her love of fragrances and was often portrayed among her wide collection of bottles. For the promotion of Tonight or Never in 1931, given that the movie title was inspired by the Offenthal fragrance name, an unprecedented tie-in advertising campaign was conceived to promote both the movie and the fragrance.

She was a pupil of the yoga guru Indra Devi and was photographed performing a series of yoga poses, reportedly looking much younger than her age, for Devi to use in her book Forever Young, Forever Healthy; but the publisher Prentice-Hall decided to use the photographs for Swanson's book, not Devi's. In return, Swanson, who normally didn't do publicity events, helped to launch Devi's book at the Waldorf-Astoria in 1953.

As a Republican she supported the 1940 and 1944 campaigns for president of Wendell Willkie and Thomas E. Dewey respectively, and the 1964 presidential campaign of Barry Goldwater. In 1980, she chaired the New York chapter of Seniors for Reagan-Bush.

In 1964, Swanson spoke at a "Project Prayer" rally attended by 2,500 at the Shrine Auditorium in Los Angeles. The gathering, which was hosted by Anthony Eisley, a star of ABC's Hawaiian Eye series, sought to flood the United States Congress with letters in support of mandatory school prayer, following two decisions in 1962 and 1963 of the United States Supreme Court, which struck down mandatory prayer as conflicting with the Establishment Clause of the First Amendment to the United States Constitution. Joining Swanson and Eisley at the Project Prayer rally were Walter Brennan, Lloyd Nolan, Rhonda Fleming, Pat Boone, and Dale Evans. Swanson declared "Under God we became the freest, strongest, wealthiest nation on earth. Should we change that?"

In 1975, Swanson traveled the United States and helped to promote the book Sugar Blues written by her husband, William Dufty. He also ghostwrote Swanson's 1981 autobiography Swanson on Swanson, which became a commercial success. The same year, she designed a stamp cachet for the United Nations Decade for Women, which was her last creative project.

=== Marriages and relationships ===
==== Wallace Beery ====
Wallace Beery and Swanson married on her 17th birthday on March 27, 1916, but by her wedding night she felt she had made a mistake and saw no way out of it. She did not like his home or his family and was repulsed by him as a lover. Swanson wrote in her autobiography that Wallace raped her on their wedding night. After becoming pregnant, she saw her husband with other women and learned he had been fired from Keystone. Taking medication given to her by Beery, purported to be for morning sickness, she miscarried the baby and was taken unconscious to the hospital. Soon afterwards, she filed for divorce, which was finalized on December 12, 1918. Under California law in that era, after a divorce was granted, there was a one-year waiting period before it became finalized so that neither of the parties could remarry.

==== Herbert K. Somborn ====
Swanson married Herbert K. Somborn on December 20, 1919. He was at that time president of Equity Pictures Corporation and later the owner of the Brown Derby restaurant. Their daughter, Gloria Swanson Somborn, was born on October 7, 1920. In 1923, she adopted one-year-old Sonny Smith, whom she renamed Joseph Patrick Swanson after her father. During their divorce proceedings, Somborn accused her of adultery with 13 men, including Cecil B. DeMille and Marshall Neilan. The public sensationalism led to Swanson having a "morals clause" added to her studio contract. Somborn was granted a divorce in Los Angeles, on September 19, 1923.

==== Henri de la Falaise ====
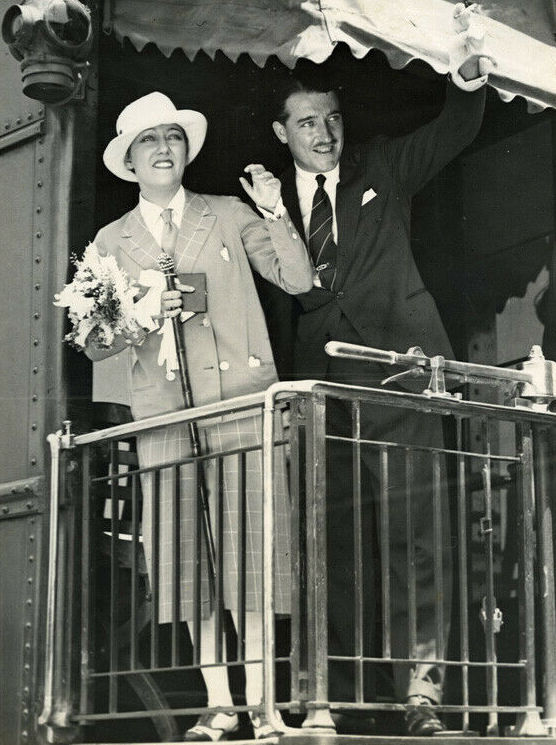
Swanson and Henri de la Falaise leaving Los Angeles for New York, July 1925

My marriage to Henri gave me the only real peace and happiness I had ever known—or have ever known since. Of my five marriages this one came the nearest to being what I, in my haus-frau heart, have always wanted a marriage to be. He was then and he remains in memory a more delightful companion than any I have known.

— Gloria Swanson, 1950

During the production of Madame Sans-Gêne, Swanson met her third husband, Henri, Marquis de la Falaise (commonly known as Henri de la Falaise), who had been hired to be her translator during the film's production. Though Henri was a Marquis and related to the famous Hennessy cognac family, he had no personal wealth. She had conceived a child with him before her divorce from Somborn was final, a situation that would have led to a public scandal and possible end of her film career. She had an abortion, which she later regretted. They married on January 28, 1925, after the Somborn divorce was finalized. Following a four-month recuperation from her abortion, they returned to the United States as European nobility. Swanson now held the title of Marquise. She received a huge welcome home with parades in both New York and Los Angeles. He became a film executive representing Pathé (USA) in France. This marriage ended in divorce in 1930.

In spite of the divorce they remained close, and Falaise became a partner in her World War II efforts to aid potential scientist refugees fleeing from behind Nazi lines. Swanson described herself as a "mental vampire", someone with a searching curiosity about how things worked, and who pursued the possibilities of turning those ideas into reality. In 1939, she created Multiprises, an inventions and patents company; Henri de la Falaise provided a transitional Paris office for the scientists and gave written documentation to authorities guaranteeing jobs for them. Viennese electronics engineer Richard Kobler, chemist Leopold Karniol, metallurgist Anton Kratky, and acoustical engineer Leopold Neumann, were brought to New York and headquartered in Rockefeller Center. The group nicknamed her "Big Chief".

==== Joseph P. Kennedy Sr. ====
While still married to Henri, Swanson had a lengthy affair with the married Joseph P. Kennedy Sr., father of future President John F. Kennedy. He became her business partner, and their relationship was an open secret in Hollywood. He took over all of her personal and business affairs and was supposed to make her millions. Kennedy left her after the disastrous Queen Kelly.

==== Michael Farmer ====
After the marriage to Henri and her affair with Kennedy was over, Swanson became acquainted with Michael Farmer, the man who would become her fourth husband. They met by chance in Paris when Swanson was being fitted by Coco Chanel for her 1931 film Tonight or Never. Farmer was a man of independent financial means who seemed not to have been employed. Rumors were that he was a gigolo. Swanson began spending time with him, during which she discovered a breast lump and also became pregnant, but was not yet divorced from Henri. She was not interested in marrying Farmer, but he did not want to break off the relationship. When Farmer found out she was pregnant, he threatened to go public with the news unless she agreed to marry him, something she did not want to do. Her friends, some of whom openly disliked him, thought she was making a mistake. They married on August 16, 1931, and separated 2 years later.

Because of the possibility that Swanson's divorce from La Falaise had not been finalized at the time of the wedding, she was forced to remarry Farmer the following November, by which time she was four months pregnant with Michelle Bridget Farmer, who was born on April 5, 1932.

==== Herbert Marshall ====
Swanson and Farmer divorced in 1934 after she became involved with married British actor Herbert Marshall. The media reported widely on her affair with Marshall. After almost three years with the actor, Swanson left him once she became convinced he would never divorce his wife, Edna Best, for her. In an early manuscript of her autobiography written in her own hand decades later, Swanson recalled, "I was never so convincingly and thoroughly loved as I was by Herbert Marshall."

==== William M. Davey ====
Davey was a wealthy investment broker whom Swanson met in October 1944 while she was appearing in A Goose for the Gander. They married January 29, 1945. Swanson had initially thought she was going to be able to retire from acting, but the marriage was troubled from the start by Davey's alcoholism. Erratic behavior and acrimonious recriminations followed. Swanson and her daughter Michelle Farmer visited an Alcoholics Anonymous meeting and gathered AA pamphlets, which they placed around the apartment. Davey moved out. In the subsequent legal separation proceedings, the judge ordered him to pay Swanson alimony. In an effort to avoid the payments, Davey unsuccessfully filed for divorce on the grounds of mental cruelty. He died within a year, not having paid anything to Swanson, and left the bulk of his estate to the Damon Runyon Cancer Memorial Fund.

==== William Dufty ====
Swanson's final marriage occurred in 1976 and lasted until her death. Her sixth husband William Dufty was a writer who worked for many years at the New York Post, where he was assistant to the editor from 1951 to 1960. He was the co-author (ghostwriter) of Billie Holiday's autobiography Lady Sings the Blues, the author of Sugar Blues (a 1975 best-selling health book still in print), and the author of the English version of Georges Ohsawa's You Are All Sanpaku. They met in the mid-1960s and moved in together. Swanson shared her husband's enthusiasm for macrobiotic diets, and they traveled widely together to speak about nutrition. Swanson and her husband first got to know John Lennon and Yoko Ono because they were fans of Dufty's work. Swanson testified on Lennon's behalf at his immigration hearing in New York City, which led to his becoming a permanent US resident. Besides her Fifth Avenue apartment, she and Dufty spent time at their homes in Beverly Hills, California; Colares, Portugal; Croton-on-Hudson, New York; and Palm Springs, California. After Swanson's death, Dufty returned to his former home in Birmingham, Michigan. He died of cancer in 2002.

=== Death ===
Swanson died of a heart ailment at the New York Hospital on April 4, 1983, having recently returned from her home on the Portuguese Riviera. Her body was cremated and her ashes interred at the Church of the Heavenly Rest on Fifth Avenue in New York City, attended by a small number of family members.

After Swanson's death, there was a series of auctions from August to September 1983 at William Doyle Galleries in New York. Collectors bought her furniture and decorations, jewelry, clothing, and memorabilia from her personal life and career.

== Honors and legacy ==
In 1960, Gloria Swanson was honored with two stars on the Hollywood Walk of Fame: one for motion pictures at 6750 Hollywood Boulevard, and another for television at 6301 Hollywood Boulevard. In 1955 and 1957, Swanson was awarded The George Eastman Award, given by George Eastman House for distinguished contribution to the art of film, and in 1966, the museum honored her with a career film retrospective, titled A Tribute to Gloria Swanson, which screened several of her movies. In 1974, Swanson was one of the honorees of the first Telluride Film Festival. A parking lot by Sims Park in downtown New Port Richey, Florida, is named after the star, who is said to have owned property along the Cotee River.

In 1982, a year before her death, Swanson sold her archives of more than 600 boxes for an undisclosed sum, including photographs, artwork, copies of films and private papers, including correspondence, contracts, and financial dealings, to the Harry Ransom Center at the University of Texas at Austin (UT Austin). Upon her death in 1983, much of the remainder of her holdings was purchased by UT Austin at an auction held at the Doyle New York gallery. An undisclosed amount of memorabilia was also gifted to the HRC Center between 1983 and 1988.

In 1989, the Library of Congress chose Sunset Boulevard, along with 24 other films, "to be preserved in the permanent collection of the National Film Registry of the Library of Congress as culturally, historically, and aesthetically important".

== Portrayals ==
Swanson has been played both on television and in film by the following actresses:

- 1971: Carol Burnett on The Carol Burnett Show
- 1984: Diane Venora in The Cotton Club
- 1990: Madolyn Smith in The Kennedys of Massachusetts
- 1991: Ann Turkel in White Hot: The Mysterious Murder of Thelma Todd
- 2008: Kristen Wiig in Saturday Night Live
- 2013: Debi Mazar in Return to Babylon

== Stage ==
Note: The list below is limited to New York Broadway theatrical productions.

Broadway credits of Gloria Swanson
Title	Date	Role	Ref(s)
A Goose for the Gander	January 23, 1945 – February 3, 1945	Katherine	
Bathsheba	March 26, 1947 – April 19, 1947		
Twentieth Century	December 24, 1950 – June 2, 1951	Lily Garland	
Nina	December 5, 1951 – January 12, 1952	Nina	
Butterflies Are Free	September 7, 1971 – July 2, 1972	Mrs. Baker	

== Filmography ==
Key
†	Denotes a lost or presumed lost film.

=== Shorts ===
Short subject
Title	Year	Role	Notes Studio/Distributor	Ref(s)
The Song of the Soul †	1914		Unconfirmed	
The Misjudged Mr. Hartley †	1915	Maid		
At the End of a Perfect Day †	1915	Hands Bouquet to Holmes	Uncredited, actual release date of January 26, 1915	
The Ambition of the Baron	1915	Bit part	Essanay Film starring Francis X. Bushman	
His New Job	1915	Stenographer	Essanay Film; Written and directed by Charlie Chaplin	
The Fable of Elvira and Farina and the Meal Ticket †	1915	Farina, Elvira's Daughter	Credited as Gloria Mae; Essanay Film	
Sweedie Goes to College †	1915	College Girl	Wallace Beery played Sweedie in a series of shorts Essanay Film	
The Romance of an American Duchess †	1915	Minor Role	Uncredited; Essanay Film	
The Broken Pledge †	1915	Gloria	Essanay Film	
A Dash of Courage †	1916		Keystone/Triangle with Bobby Vernon directed by Clarence G. Badger	
Hearts and Sparks †	1916		Keystone/Triangle with Bobby Vernon directed by Clarence G. Badger	
A Social Cub †	1916		Keystone/Triangle with Bobby Vernon directed by Clarence G. Badger	
The Danger Girl	1916	Reggie's madcap sister	Keystone/Triangle with Bobby Vernon directed by Clarence G. Badger	
Haystacks and Steeples †	1916		Keystone/Triangle with Bobby Vernon directed by Clarence G. Badger	
The Nick of Time Baby	1916		Keystone/Triangle with Bobby Vernon directed by Clarence G. Badger	
Teddy at the Throttle	1917	Gloria Dawn, His Sweetheart	Uncredited with Bobby Vernon; Keystone/Triangle directed by Clarence G. Badger	
Baseball Madness †	1917		Victor Film/Universal	
Dangers of a Bride †	1917		Keystone/Triangle directed by Clarence G. Badger	
Whose Baby?	1917		Keystone/Triangle with Bobby Vernon directed by Clarence G. Badger	
The Sultan's Wife	1917	Gloria	Keystone/Triangle with Bobby Vernon directed by Clarence G. Badger	
The Pullman Bride	1917	The Girl	Paramount-Mack Sennett directed by Clarence G. Badger	
A Trip to Paramountown	1922	Herself	Paramount	

=== Features ===
Feature film credits of Gloria Swanson
Title	Year	Role	Notes Studio/Distributor	Ref(s)
Society for Sale †	1918	Phylis Clyne	Triangle Film Corporation	
Her Decision †	1918	Phyllis Dunbar	Triangle Film Corporation directed by Jack Conway	
You Can't Believe Everything †	1918	Patricia Reynolds	Triangle Film Corporation directed by Jack Conway	
Station Content	1918	Kitty Manning	Triangle Film Corporation directed by Arthur Hoyt; One reel survives	
Everywoman's Husband	1918	Edith Emerson	Triangle Film Corporation directed by Gilbert P. Hamilton	
Shifting Sands	1918	Marcia Grey	Triangle Film Corporation directed by Albert Parker	
The Secret Code †	1918	Sally Carter Rand	Triangle Film Corporation directed by Albert Parker	
Wife or Country †	1918	Sylvia Hamilton	Triangle Film Corporation directed by E. Mason Hopper	
Don't Change Your Husband	1919	Leila Porter	Famous Players–Lasky/Paramount directed by Cecil B. DeMille	
For Better, for Worse	1919	Sylvia Norcross	Famous Players–Lasky/Paramount directed by Cecil B. DeMille	
Male and Female	1919	Lady Mary Lasenby	Famous Players–Lasky/Paramount directed by Cecil B. DeMille	
Why Change Your Wife?	1920	Beth Gordon	Famous Players–Lasky/Paramount directed by Cecil B. DeMille	
Something to Think About	1920	Ruth Anderson	Famous Players–Lasky/Paramount directed by Cecil B. DeMille	
The Affairs of Anatol	1921	Vivian Spencer – Anatol's Wife	Famous Players–Lasky/Paramount directed by Cecil B. DeMille	
The Great Moment †	1921	Nada Pelham/Nadine Pelham	Famous Players–Lasky/Paramount directed by Sam Wood	
Under the Lash †	1921	Deborah Krillet	Famous Players–Lasky/Paramount directed by Sam Wood	
Don't Tell Everything †	1921	Marian Westover	Famous Players–Lasky/Paramount directed by Sam Wood	
Her Husband's Trademark	1922	Lois Miller	Famous Players–Lasky/Paramount directed by Sam Wood	
Her Gilded Cage †	1922	Suzanne Ornoff	Famous Players–Lasky/Paramount directed by Sam Wood	
Beyond the Rocks	1922	Theodora Fitzgerald	Famous Players–Lasky/Paramount directed by Sam Wood	
The Impossible Mrs. Bellew †	1922	Betty Bellew	Famous Players–Lasky/Paramount directed by Sam Wood	
My American Wife †	1922	Natalie Chester	Famous Players–Lasky/Paramount directed by Sam Wood	
Prodigal Daughters †	1923	Swifty Forbes	Famous Players–Lasky/Paramount directed by Sam Wood	
Bluebeard's 8th Wife †	1923	Mona deBriac	Famous Players–Lasky/Paramount directed by Sam Wood	
Hollywood †	1923	Cameo role	Famous Players–Lasky/Paramount	
Zaza	1923	Zaza	Famous Players–Lasky/Paramount directed by Allan Dwan	
The Humming Bird	1924	Toinette	Famous Players–Lasky/Paramount directed by Sidney Olcott	
A Society Scandal †	1924	Marjorie Colbert	Famous Players–Lasky/Paramount directed by Allan Dwan	
Manhandled	1924	Tessie McGuire	Famous Players–Lasky/Paramount directed by Allan Dwan	
Her Love Story †	1924	Princess Marie	Famous Players–Lasky/Paramount directed by Allan Dwan	
Wages of Virtue †	1924	Carmelita	Famous Players–Lasky/Paramount directed by Allan Dwan	
Madame Sans-Gêne †	1925	Madame Sans-Gêne	Famous Players–Lasky/Paramount directed by Léonce Perret	
The Coast of Folly †	1925	Joyce Gathway/Nadine Gathway	Famous Players–Lasky/Paramount directed by Allan Dwan	
Stage Struck	1925	Jennie Hagen	Famous Players–Lasky/Paramount directed by Allan Dwan	
The Untamed Lady †	1926	St. Clair Van Tassel	Famous Players–Lasky/Paramount directed by Frank Tuttle	
Fine Manners	1926	Orchid Murphy	Famous Players–Lasky/Paramount directed by Richard Rosson	
The Love of Sunya	1927	Sunya Ashling	Swanson Producing Corporation/United Artists directed by Albert Parker	
Sadie Thompson	1928	Sadie Thompson	Gloria Swanson Productions/United Artists directed by Raoul Walsh	
Queen Kelly	1928	Kitty Kelly/Queen Kelly	Joseph P. Kennedy/United Artists directed by Erich von Stroheim	
The Trespasser	1929	Marion Donnell	Gloria Productions/United Artists directed by Edmund Goulding; Released in two versions, one silent, and the other with sound	
What a Widow!	1930	Tamarind Brook	Gloria Productions/United Artists directed by Allan Dwan	
Indiscreet	1931	Geraldine "Gerry" Trent	Feature Productions, Inc. A DeSylva, Brown & Henderson Production directed by Leo McCarey	
Tonight or Never	1931	Nella Vago	Feature Productions, Inc./United Artists directed by Mervyn LeRoy	
Perfect Understanding	1933	Judy Rogers	Gloria Swanson British Productions, Ltd./United Artists directed by Cyril Gardner	
Music in the Air	1934	Frieda Hotzfelt	Erich Pommer Productions/Fox Film directed by Joe May	
Father Takes a Wife	1941	Leslie Collier Osborne	Marcus Lee/RKO Radio Pictures, Inc. directed by William Dorfman	
Sunset Boulevard	1950	Norma Desmond	Charles Brackett/Paramount directed by Billy Wilder	
3 for Bedroom C	1952	Ann Haven/costume designer	Brenco Pictures Corporation/Warner Bros. directed by Milton H. Bren	
Nero's Mistress	1956	Agrippina	Les Films Marceau and Titanus/Manhattan Films International directed by Steno	
Airport 1975	1974	Herself	Universal Pictures directed by Jack Smight	

=== Television ===
Television
Title	Year	Role	Notes	Ref(s)
The Gloria Swanson Hour	1948	Hostess	Variety show	
The Peter Lind Hayes Show	1950	Herself	Episode #1.1 sitcom show	
Hollywood Opening Night	1953		Episode: "The Pattern"	
Crown Theatre with Gloria Swanson	1954–1955	Hostess	25 episodes	
The Steve Allen Show	1957	Norma Desmond	Episode #3.8	
Straightaway	1961	Lorraine Carrington	Episode: "A Toast to Yesterday"	
Dr. Kildare	1963	Julia Colton	Episode: "The Good Luck Charm"	
Burke's Law	1963–1964	Various roles	2 episodes	
Kraft Suspense Theatre	1964	Mrs. Charlotte Heaton	Segment: "Who Is Jennifer?"	
The Alfred Hitchcock Hour	1964	Mrs. Daniels	Episode: "Behind the Locked Door"	
My Three Sons	1965	Margaret McSterling	Episode: "The Fountain of Youth"	
Ben Casey	1965	Victoria Hoffman	Episode: "Minus That Rusty Old Hacksaw"	
The Beverly Hillbillies	1966	Herself	Episode: "The Gloria Swanson Story"	
The Eternal Tramp Special	1972	Narrator	aka Chaplinesque, My Life and Hard Times	
The Carol Burnett Show	1973	Herself	Episode #7.3	
Killer Bees	1974	Madame Maria von Bohlen	Television movie	
The Great Debate	1974	Herself	Canadian interview show with James Bawden	
Hollywood	1980	Herself	Television documentary	

== Awards and nominations ==
Year	Award	Result	Category	Film or series	Ref(s)
1929	Academy Award	Nominated	Best Actress	Sadie Thompson	
1931	Academy Award	Nominated	Best Actress	The Trespasser	
1951	Academy Award	Nominated	Best Actress	Sunset Boulevard	
1950	Golden Globe Award	Won	Best Actress – Motion Picture Drama	Sunset Boulevard	
1964	Golden Globe Award	Nominated	Best TV Star – Female	Burke's Law	
1951	Italian National Syndicate of Film Journalists	Won	Best Actress – Foreign Film (Migliore Attrice Straniera)	Sunset Boulevard	
1951	Jussi Award	Won	Best Foreign Actress	Sunset Boulevard	
1950	National Board of Review of Motion Pictures	Won	Best Actress	Sunset Boulevard	
1980	National Board of Review of Motion Pictures	Won	Career Achievement Award	-	
1975	Saturn Award	Won	Special Award	-	

== See also ==
- List of actors with Academy Award nominations

== Sources ==
- Balio, Tino (2009). United Artists, Volume 1, 1919–1950: The Company Built by the Stars. University of Wisconsin Press. ISBN 978-0-299-23003-6.
- Bawden, James; Miller, Ron (2016). "Gloria Swanson". Conversations with Classic Film Stars: Interviews from Hollywood's Golden Era. The University Press of Kentucky. pp. 14–26. ISBN 978-0-8131-6712-1.
- Beauchamp, Cari (2009). Joseph P. Kennedy Presents: His Hollywood Years (First Vintage Books ed.). New York: Vintage Books. ISBN 978-0-307-47522-0.
- Birchard, Robert S. S. (2009). Cecil B. DeMille's Hollywood. The University Press of Kentucky. ISBN 978-0-8131-2636-4.
- Carper, James C. (2009). The Praeger Handbook of Religion and Education in the United States. Westport, Conn.: Praeger Publishers. ISBN 978-0-275-99227-9.
- Desjardins, Mary R. (2015). Recycled Stars: Female Film Stardom in the Age of Television and Video. Durham, North Carolina: Duke University Press. ISBN 978-0-8223-7603-3.
- Dufty, William (1993). Sugar Blues. Grand Central Publishing.
- Harzig, Christiane; Matovic, Margareta, eds. (2018). "Embracing a Middle-Class Life: Swedish-American Women in Lake View". Peasant Maids, City Women: From the European Countryside to Urban America. Cornell University Press. pp. 261–298. ISBN 978-1-5017-2554-8.
- Hershfield, Joanne (2000). The Invention of Dolores Del Rio. University of Minnesota Press. ISBN 978-0-8166-5282-2.
- Holbrook, Morris (2011). Music, Movies, Meanings, and Markets: Cinemajazzamatazz. Hoboken: Taylor & Francis. ISBN 978-0-203-81553-3.
- King, Rob (2009). The Fun Factory: The Keystone Film Company and the Emergence of Mass Culture. Berkeley: University of California Press. ISBN 978-0-520-25538-8.
- Lennig, Arthur (2000). Stroheim. The University Press of Kentucky. ISBN 978-0-8131-7125-8.
- Mino, Salvestri (1925). Gloria Swanson: La grande attrice di moda (PDF). Milan, Gloriosa Editore.
- Moss, Marilyn (2011). "Pre-Code Walsh". Raoul Walsh: The True Adventures of Hollywood's Legendary Director. The University Press of Kentucky. ISBN 978-0-8131-3394-2.
- Pearson, Drew (May 14, 1964). "The Washington Merry-Go-Round" (PDF). dspace.wrlc.org. Archived from the original (PDF) on January 16, 2013.
- Phillips, Gene (2010). Some Like It Wilder: The Life and Controversial Films of Billy Wilder. The University Press of Kentucky. ISBN 978-0-8131-7367-2.
- Quirk, Lawrence J. (1984). The Films of Gloria Swanson. Citadel Press. ISBN 0-8065-0874-4.
- Shearer, Stephen Michael (2013). Gloria Swanson: The Ultimate Star. Thomas Dunne Books. ISBN 978-1-250-00155-9.
- Syman, Stefanie (2010). The Subtle Body: The Story of Yoga in America. Farrar, Straus and Giroux. ISBN 978-0-374-53284-0. OCLC 456171421.
- Thomson, David (2014). The New Biographical Dictionary of Film (Sixth ed.). New York: Alfred A. Knopf. ISBN 978-0-375-71184-8.
- Welsch, Tricia (2013). Gloria Swanson: Ready for Her Close-Up. University Press of Mississippi. ISBN 978-1-62103-991-4.
