= Perino's =

Restaurant in Los Angeles, California, United States

Perino's was a restaurant located on Wilshire Boulevard in Los Angeles, California. The original location at 3927 Wilshire Boulevard was opened in 1932 by Italian-American restaurateur Alexander Perino, immediately becoming popular with Hollywood's elite. In 1950 it moved to a larger location at 4101 Wilshire, where it remained until it closed in 1986. The restaurant was a Los Angeles landmark which, like the Brown Derby, Chasen's, and Romanoff's, was famed for its celebrity clientele during the Hollywood Golden Age. Despite its closure, the restaurant enjoyed an afterlife as a filming location for film and television until the building was sold and demolished in 2005.

== History ==
Alessandro Bruno Perino was born in Brusnengo, Piedmont, northern Italy in 1895; as a nineteen-year old pastry cook, he emigrated to the United States as a steerage passenger on the S/S La Lorraine, which arrived at the Port of New York in February 1914. With $2,000 in savings ($64,286 in 2025 dollars), Perino opened his famous Los Angeles restaurant in 1932. The cuisine was a mixture of high-class Italian and French food at the then exorbitant price of $1.25 per dish ($29 in 2025 dollars). The restaurant quickly accrued a loyal clientele including Mae West, Dolores del Río, Ronald Colman and Ezio Pinza. Other regular patrons were Joan Crawford, Hedda Hopper, Cary Grant, Marilyn Monroe, Alfred Hitchcock, Dean Martin, Joe DiMaggio and Elizabeth Taylor. Despite a fire which gutted the interior in 1934, Perino's popularity grew throughout the 1930s, becoming a premiere gathering spot for celebrities, Hollywood executives and politicians. Bette Davis had a booth permanently reserved for her, Frank Sinatra would occasionally perform at the Steinway piano in the restaurant bar, and Cole Porter composed songs on the back of menus. Richard Nixon, Ronald and Nancy Reagan were regulars. During the 1940s and 50s the restaurant gained a reputation as a Mob hangout, because it was frequented by such figures as Bugsy Siegel, Johnny Stompanato and Frank Desimone. In the early 50s a mob summit convened between L.A. based mobster Jack Dragna and Anthony 'Big Tuna' Accardo was broken up by the police at Perino's.

Perino's was renowned for the high quality of its food, and Perino for his fastidious attention to detail. There were 150 separate entrées on the menu and 270 different wines. Food was never frozen, salad greens were brought in fresh from a farmer on the Palos Verdes Peninsula, tomatoes were never stored over ice for fear of diminishing their flavor, and ice for the bar never supplied from the kitchen for fear of contaminating it with the smell of food. Menu items changed daily and on special occasions pressed duck was served at the table prepared from an antique duck press that belonged to Joan Crawford and her fourth husband Alfred Steele. The service was also excellent, with waiters abiding by Perino's credo that "the best service is that which is never seen." In 1950, Perino's moved to a larger location in a former Thriftimart supermarket at 4101 Wilshire. Architect Paul Revere Williams was hired to implement a $400,000 renovation ($5,352,697 in 2025 dollars). He chose a New Orleans theme, in pink, beige and peach tones, which would become Perino's signature. The outside featured a porte-cochère in wrought-iron, a mansard roof, and pink stucco. The central dining room, which could accommodate 150 diners, was a large rotunda lined with banquettes upholstered in salmon-colored velvet, crystal chandelier sconces, and floor-length mirrors. Tables were covered in pink linen, each with a single pink rose placed on top, and pastry-carts and serving trays were made of solid silver.

In 1954 the restaurant suffered another disastrous fire, blamed on a discarded cigarette left on an upholstered chair, which cost $250,000 in damages ($3,004,658 in 2025 dollars). Paul Williams returned to supervise the restoration, which featured furniture and paneling in the "French Continental" style. Perino's would remain a hugely popular venue through the 1960s, and Alexander Perino would sell in 1969. The restaurants' popularity began to decline in the 1970s with changing tastes; an attempt to re-launch it under new ownership failed in 1986, leading to its closure.

In 2002, the defunct restaurant was purchased by real estate developer Tom Carey, and the contents were auctioned off two years later. The building was demolished in 2005 and an apartment building constructed in its place. The lobby of the new building retains mementos from Perino's.

== In popular culture ==
Before its closure in 1986, Perino's had already become a popular filming location, appearing both as itself and for general use in restaurant scenes. It continued in this vein and as a venue for the occasional private event through 2004, when it was purchased by a developer.

The exterior of Perino's at its first location appears in Sunset Boulevard (1950), in the scene where Norma Desmond takes Joe to a haberdashery to buy clothes.

George Hamilton appears in the restaurant, in the 1979 film Love at First Bite, with Susan Saint James and Richard Benjamin.

Dustin Hoffman appears in the restaurant, in Marathon Man.

American Gigolo (1980) filmed a scene at Perino's where Richard Gere's character Julian asks Anne (Nina van Pallandt) for help.

The 1981 biopic Mommie Dearest featured a scene where Joan Crawford attends dinner with Louis B. Mayer at Perino's. She later declares that "Perino's is my place!" in anger at having to dine with her boss. Later in the film Crawford and her daughter attend lunch there.

Scarface (1983) uses Perino's for a restaurant scene between Tony Montana, Elvira and Manny.

Numerous television shows used Perino's for restaurant scenes, including Melrose Place, Hart to Hart, Dallas, Falcon Crest and Columbo.

1992's Chaplin includes a scene where Charlie Chaplin (Robert Downey Jr.) takes Paulette Goddard (Diane Lane) to Perino's for dinner.

The 2017 FX anthology series Feud: Bette & Joan sets numerous dining scenes at Perino's for the fictional counterparts of real-life regulars Joan Crawford, Bette Davis and Hedda Hopper. The famous dining room of Perino's was recreated on a soundstage.

== See also ==
- Brown Derby
- Chasen's
- List of defunct restaurants of the United States
