= Herbert K. Somborn =

American film producer (1880–1934)

- Born: 1880
- Died: January 2, 1934 (aged 53–54)
- Occupations: Film director; producer
- Spouse: Gloria Swanson (m. 1919; div. 1922)

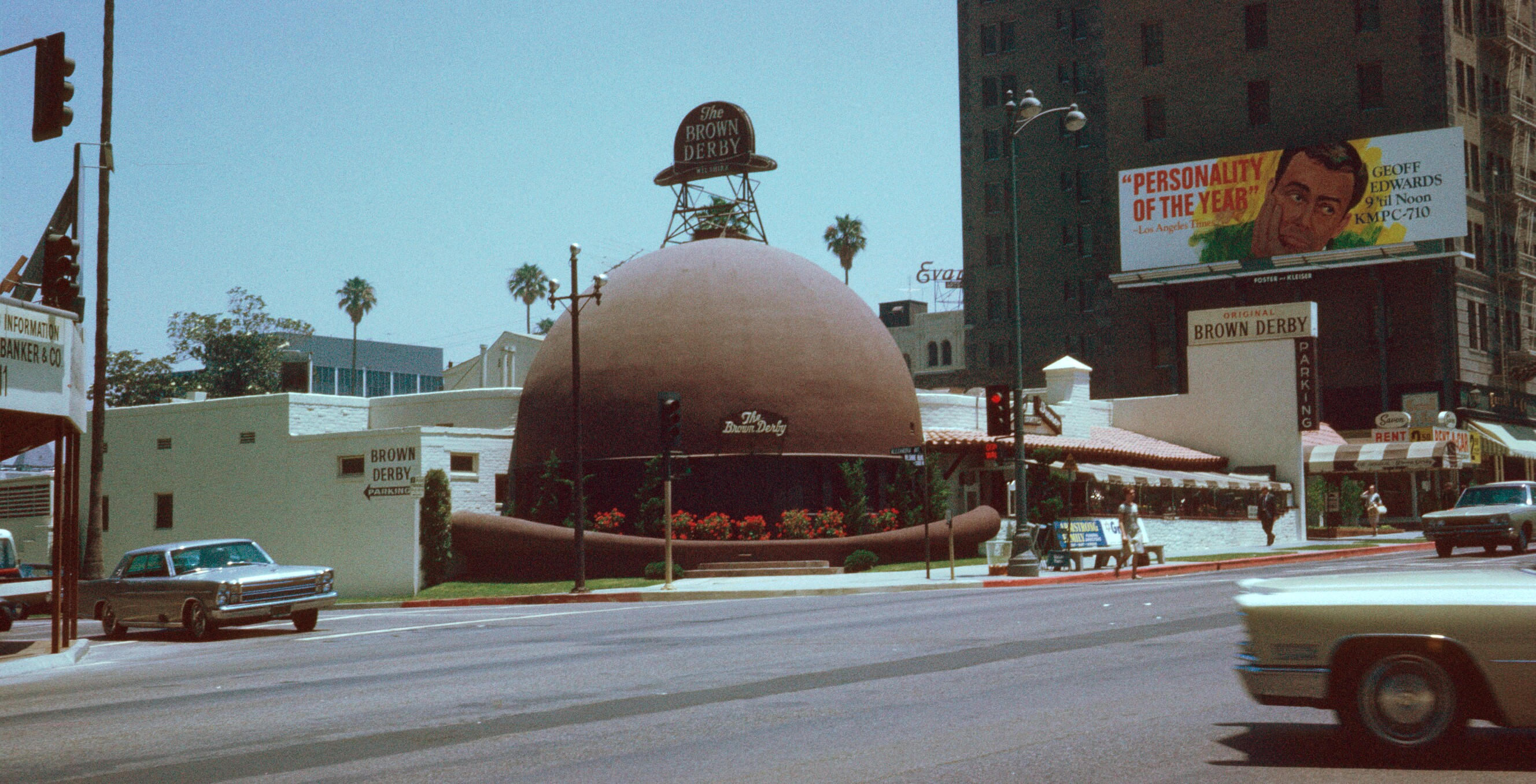
The Brown Derby restaurant in Los Angeles, California

Herbert K. Somborn (1880 – January 2, 1934) was an American film director and producer, and restaurant owner.

== Biography ==
Somborn was the president of Equity Pictures, a film distribution company. He married Gloria Swanson in a civil ceremony at the Alexandria Hotel in Los Angeles on December 20, 1919. They stayed in the hotel after the marriage, but as Equity was in financial difficulties they had to move out in 1920 to an apartment in Hollywood. They had one daughter, also named Gloria, born on October 6, 1920. In 1921 Somborn wrote to Swanson to say that he was leaving her. In March 1923 Somborn alleged that Swanson had committed adultery with fourteen men, including Cecil B. De Mille, Jesse Lasky, and Adolph Zukor, and asked for a $150,000 settlement. Scandals involving Fatty Arbuckle and Bill Taylor had led to the formation of the Association of Motion Picture Producers and Distributors of America, partly to manage public perception of the film industry's morals, run by Will Hays. Swanson was concerned that a divorce scandal would wreck her career, and Lasky faked a telegram from Hays suggesting that it would also be disastrous for the entire industry. Swanson agreed to negotiate with Somborn, and the final divorce papers granted him $70,000. They divorced on August 9, 1922 but remained friends.

Somborn opened the Brown Derby restaurant on Wilshire Boulevard, using the settlement money; the restaurant building was shaped like a two-story derby hat. It became a favourite eating place for people in the movie industry, including Wallace Beery, Swanson's first husband. Somborn eventually owned three Brown Derby restaurants in the Los Angeles area.

He died from complications of a kidney ailment.

== Sources ==
- Madsen, Axel (1988). Gloria and Joe: The Star-Crossed Love Affair of Gloria Swanson and Joe Kennedy. New York: Arbor House. ISBN 0-87795-946-3.
