= Mack and Mabel =

American musical

Mack & Mabel
- Original Broadway Recording
- Music: Jerry Herman
- Lyrics: Jerry Herman
- Book: Michael Stewart
- Productions: 1974 Broadway; 1995 West End; 2006 West End revival 2015 UK Tour; 2020 Encores!

Mack & Mabel is a musical with a book by Michael Stewart and music and lyrics by Jerry Herman. The plot involves the tumultuous romantic relationship between Hollywood director Mack Sennett and Mabel Normand (transformed from an artist's model to a waitress from Flatbush, Brooklyn, for the musical), who became one of his biggest stars. In a series of flashbacks, Sennett relates the glory days of Keystone Studios from 1911, when he discovered Normand and cast her in dozens of his early "two-reelers", through his creation of Sennett's Bathing Beauties and the Keystone Cops to Mabel's death from tuberculosis in 1930.

The original 1974 Broadway production produced by David Merrick starred Robert Preston and Bernadette Peters. It received eight Tony Award nominations, including Best Musical, but did not win any. There was no nomination for Jerry Herman's score. Although the original production closed after only eight weeks, the songs were praised, and subsequent productions, especially in Britain, have had success.

== Background and productions ==
Edwin Lester, the director of the Los Angeles Civic Light Opera, suggested the project to Jerry Herman, who then involved Michael Stewart. David Merrick agreed to produce, and Gower Champion was engaged to direct and choreograph. Although Champion had initially declined the offer, he eventually accepted, especially when it was decided to hold the pre-Broadway tryouts in California. Robert Preston was hired as Mack. For the role of Mabel, several actresses were engaged and then let go, including Marcia Rodd and Kelly Garrett, before the young Bernadette Peters finally joined the cast.

=== Pre-Broadway tryouts ===
Mack and Mabel opened in pre-Broadway tryouts in San Francisco on June 17, 1974 and then Los Angeles, with brisk box office sales in both cities. According to The New York Times, " 'Mack and Mabel' has been doing rather better than its probable guarantee [in Los Angeles] – up to $150,000 in its final seven-day period." The musical received reviews that ranged "from fair to phenomenal in San Diego, Los Angeles, and St. Louis". The Los Angeles reviews were "encouraging but guarded", and warned "of the excessive comic sequences, uneven book, and, most especially, the dark ending." Buoyed by the critical response and initial public enthusiasm for the show, Herman and company ignored a number of warning signs. Neither Sennett nor Normand was a particularly lovable character, and their story was darker than that usually found in a musical. Preston (as Sennett) was too old for Peters (Mabel), and their characters lacked chemistry. Champion devised a number of eye-catching visual effects and spectacular dance sequences set to Philip J. Lang's orchestrations, but their brightness proved to be too great a contrast with the somber mood of the piece. His concept of setting the action in the corner of a huge studio soundstage created problems with the set and limited the staging to the extent that it was seen as static and boring. Audiences "were not ready for a down-beat saga about a cocaine-sniffing movie queen."

Efforts were made to resolve the problems at The Muny in St. Louis, where the musical ran for one week starting August 19, 1974, but this venue was a "terrible mistake". Because The Muny was so large, the performers overplayed and pulled the show out of shape. By the Washington, D.C. Kennedy Center engagement, "nothing was working", and Champion changed the staging of scenes that had previously worked. Richard Coe in his review for The Washington Post stated that it had landed at the Kennedy Center "with all the zip of a wet, very dead flounder."

=== Broadway ===
The musical opened at the Majestic Theatre on Broadway on October 6, 1974, and closed on November 30, 1974, after 66 performances and six previews. Scenic design was by Robin Wagner, costume design by Patricia Zipprodt, and lighting design by Tharon Musser. In addition to Preston and Peters, the cast featured Lisa Kirk as Lottie Ames and James Mitchell as William Desmond Taylor.

Despite only fair reviews and the short run, the show received eight Tony Award nominations: for Best Musical, the book, direction, choreography, lead actor, lead actress and designs but did not win any. Herman, whose melodic score had received the best notices, was not nominated. He was deeply disappointed, since the project had been one of his favorites (and remained until the end of his life), and he felt producer David Merrick had done little to promote it, saying "He never invested in advertising. He never came to the theatre." Herman had turned down three film offers before its Broadway opening, later commenting early in its New York run that he believed he was then in a "stronger position." Despite its failure, the show has developed a cult following.

=== Subsequent productions ===
Mack and Mabel was first produced in England in 1981 at the Nottingham Playhouse. The production starred Denis Quilley as Mack and Imelda Staunton as Mabel; it had a successful run but failed to transfer to the West End. Soon afterward, British ice-skating team Torvill and Dean, who were based in Nottingham, searched the music library at the local radio station for suitable material for their routines, and discovered a recording of the original cast album. When they won the gold medal for ice dance in the World Figure Skating Championships in 1982, they performed to the Mack and Mabel overture. Later, the routine was broadcast by BBC Television during the 1984 Olympics, with the British public demand so great that the album was re-released in the UK, where it reached number 6 on the charts.

In February 1988, a one-time concert, featuring George Hearn, Georgia Brown, Denis Quilley, Paige O'Hara, and Tommy Tune was staged for charity at the Theatre Royal, Drury Lane, London. A cast recording was released.

1995 West End

On November 7, 1995, a full-scale production opened at the Piccadilly Theatre in London, and ran for 270 performances. The book had been dramatically revised, including a happy ending, with Mabel back in Mack's arms at the final curtain. The show was directed by Paul Kerryson and choreographed by Michael Smuin, and the cast included Howard McGillin as Mack and Caroline O'Connor as Mabel, Kathryn Evans, and Alan Mosley.

2005-2006 Watermill and West End

The show was revived at the Watermill Theatre, in Newbury, England. David Soul starred alongside Anna-Jane Casey (replaced by Janie Dee in the West End production) in the small-scale production (with only eleven performers), which ran for a limited season between March and June 2005. The show then toured the UK from January 2006 prior to a West End transfer, where it played at the Criterion Theatre from April 10, 2006, until July 1, 2006. It featured the trademark style of director John Doyle, with the cast members, except for Soul, playing musical instruments as well as acting and singing.

2007 and 2008 productions

The show was produced at the Shaw Festival Theatre in Niagara-on-the-Lake, Ontario in 2007. Directed by Molly Smith, this production eliminated the use of projected film as called for in the script. Instead, monochromatic costumes and special lighting were used to produce the effect of silent film while using live actors on stage. The result was a seamless blend between silent film scenes, and full color. Shaw's presentation was the first full production in Canada and was in repertory at the Festival Theatre until October 28, 2007.

The Broadway Theatre, Catford, London, UK, produced the musical from November 2008 through December 2008, starring Karl Clarkson (Mack), Gemma Boaden (Mabel) and Sean Pol McGreevy (Frank), directed by Artistic Director Thom Southerland. Southerland had assisted John Doyle with the 2005-2006 production.

2011

The Company Music Theatre produced a short run of the show in August 2011 at the Greenwich Theatre, London, directed by Ben Occhpinti, choreographed by Lee Crowley, with Musical Director Dan Swana.

2012

It was revived in July 2012 at the Southwark Playhouse, under the direction of Thom Southerland, with choreography by Lee Proud. The title roles were played by Norman Bowman and Laura Pitt-Pulford, with Jessica Martin as Lottie, Stuart Matthew Price as Frank Capra and Peter Kenworthy as William Desmond Taylor.

2013

Musical Theatre West in Long Beach, California performed a concert version at the Carpenter Performing Arts Center on May 20, starring Davis Gaines, as Mack Sennett, with direction by Larry Carpenter, choreography by Karl Warden and musical direction by John McDaniel. Eldorado Productions performed Mack & Mabel at The Bob Hope Theatre in Eltham, south east London, from 9 to 12 October 2013, with Neil Whitaker as Mack and Jo-jo Butler starring as Mabel, directed by Jeanette Wallis; this production included the original ending.

2015

Chichester Festival Theatre in West Sussex, UK presented a new production from 13 July to 5 September 2015, with a UK tour following from 1 October to 6 December 2015. The musical starred Michael Ball as Mack Sennett and Rebecca LaChance, with direction by Jonathan Church, choreography by Stephen Mear and design by Robert Jones.

Porchlight Music Theatre, Chicago, Illinois, presented Mack and Mabel in May 2015, as a part of "Porchlight Revisits", in which they stage three forgotten musicals per year. It was directed by Michael Weber and music directed by Beckie Menzie.

2018

Shaftesbury Arts Centre in North Dorset, UK presented an amateur production from 12 to 30 July 2018, directed by Sophie Lester, with musical director David Grierson.

2020

New York City Center Encores! staged concert production ran from February 19 to 23, 2020. It was directed and choreographed by Josh Rhodes and dedicated to the memory of Jerry Herman, who had recently died. Douglas Sills and Alexandra Socha starred.

== Synopsis ==
Act I

Silent movie director Mack Sennett returns to his old film studio in Brooklyn in 1938. Things have changed considerably since he was last there—he sees a group of actors shooting a scene for a talkie. Mack reminisces about "when he ran the show", the glorious era of silent movies, thinking of his Bathing Beauties and Keystone Cops ("Movies Were Movies").

In a flashback, it is 1911. When Mabel, a delicatessen worker, delivers a sandwich to Lottie, the actress that Mack is filming, Lottie is unable to pay, and Mabel reacts violently. Mabel's dramatic behaviour catches Mack's eye, and he thinks she has potential as an actress. He offers her a part in his next film. She initially refuses, but when she looks back on the offer, she is dazzled by the career prospects ("Look What Happened To Mabel").

Mabel is very successful and becomes a major star. Later, along with Mack's two accountants, Kleiman and Fox, who are helping to finance his projects, the film company moves to a new, larger studio, in California. Lottie and the rest of Mack's film crew, who include the comedian Fatty Arbuckle, eagerly fantasize about moving up in the world, ("Big Time"). Meanwhile, Mabel has become attracted to Mack. Mack catches her unawares while she is reciting an improvised poem, and she invites him into her train compartment for a meal. Though he has become fond of Mabel, Mack has no time for serious romance ("I Won't Send Roses"). He reluctantly takes part in a mock wedding ceremony, and he and Mabel sleep together, but Mack wakes up horrified and leaves in a hurry. Mabel is still in love with Mack, and resolves to do things his way ("I Won't Send Roses" (Reprise)).

Eventually, Mabel wants to try other genres of film. Frank, an actor in Mack's company who aspires to bigger things, sees Mabel's potential as a serious actor, and has written a romantic drama called Molly, with her in mind for the title role. Mabel, who is still in love with Mack and afraid of losing him, reluctantly declines. Mack is only interested in comedy ("I Wanna Make The World Laugh"). Mabel eventually stands up to Mack and lobs a prop pie at him during rehearsals. Soon the whole cast is throwing pies, and the resulting melee inspires another set of two-reelers. Mabel regrets her childish behaviour, and the status quo is resumed.

Eventually, Mabel meets a director of serious films, the smooth-talking William Desmond Taylor, whose films she has adored for years, at a hotel reception. He is instantly attracted to her, and invites her to audition for his next film. He informs her that he has admired her for years, and believed she deserves better than two-reelers. Taylor informs Mabel that he has repeatedly asked Mack to loan her to his studios for one picture, but Mack has refused. Mabel is horrified. Taylor also invites her to dinner. Mack tries in vain to discourage her. After a heated argument, Mabel dresses in her best clothes and puts on make-up, then goes off not only for her appointment with Taylor, but for good, as she never wants to see Mack again ("Wherever He Ain't"). Mack is confident that he can manage without Mabel: he made a star out of one ordinary girl, and he can make a star out of another. With this in mind, he immediately comes up with the concept of the Bathing Beauties ("Hundreds of Girls").

Act II

Five years after Mabel's departure, the popularity of the Bathing Beauties is waning, and Mack comes under pressure to ask Mabel back. Fortunately, Mabel has realised she still has feelings for Mack and returns to the studios. She is welcomed with open arms by the entire film company ("When Mabel Comes In The Room"). Mack is so glad to have her back that he agrees to film "Molly", at his studio. But he attempts to turn it into a comedy, by way of his latest creation, The Keystone Cops, ("My Heart Leaps Up"), and Mabel returns to Taylor. Mack sees Mabel again as she is preparing to embark on a ship with Taylor. Taylor shows up and Mack leaves. Taylor, sensing that Mabel might still have feelings for Mack, persuades Mabel, who is complaining of tiredness, to take heroin, saying it is a pick-me-up, which works with the magic words, "Bye, Mack!". Mabel is heartbroken by everything Mack has done to her, ("Time Heals Everything").

The show suddenly fasts forward six years. Talkies are all the rage, and Lottie Ames, another actress in Mack's company, has become a star ("Tap Your Troubles Away"), but Mabel has become a full-time drug addict and her reputation is ruined. To add further to the tragedy, her lover, William Desmond Taylor, is murdered, and she is the prime suspect. Mack refuses to believe Mabel is a drug addict, and finally willing to try to patch things up between him and Mabel, but it is too late - she has died. The musical ends with a dream sequence, with Mack imagining a reconciliation between him and Mabel, ("I Promise You A Happy Ending" / "I Won't Send Roses (Reprise)").

== Song list ==
Act I

- Overture – Orchestra
- "Movies Were Movies" – Mack
- "Look What Happened to Mabel" – Mabel and Company
- "Big Time" – Lottie Ames and Company
- "I Won't Send Roses" – Mack
- "I Wanna Make the World Laugh" – Mack and Company
- "Wherever He Ain't" – Mabel
- "Hundreds of Girls" – Mack and Bathing Beauties

Act II

- "When Mabel Comes in the Room" – Company
- "My Heart Leaps Up" (later replaced with "Hit 'em on the Head") – Mack
- "Time Heals Everything" – Mabel
- "Tap Your Troubles Away" – Lottie and Company
- "I Promise You a Happy Ending" – Mack

== Characters ==
- Mack Sennett — An obsessively hard-working movie director
- Mabel Normand — A deli delivery girl who becomes a movie star. She is in love with Mack, and deep down he cares for her, but he wishes to keep the relationship professional.
- William Desmond Taylor — A director of serious films, and rival for both Normand's acting talents and her affections, though it is implied he has at least one other partner.
- Kleiman — An accountant
- Fox — Kleiman's partner
- Frank Wyman — An actor in Mack's company, who aspires to bigger things. He eventually becomes a writer and director.
- Lottie Ames — A silent movie star and dancer
- Fatty- A comic actor in Mack's company
- Ella- Mack's pianist
- Phyllis Foster- A woman who travels with Taylor- ostensibly his secretary, but it is implied their relationship is more than professional.
- Serge- Taylor's valet. Serge clearly dislikes the way Taylor treats Mabel, and it is possible he is Taylor's murderer.

Subsequent revisions of the show have changed some character names to their real life counterparts from the era.

- Frank Wyman - Frank Capra
- Fatty - Roscoe "Fatty" Arbuckle
- Kleiman - Adam Kessel
- Fox - Charles O. Baumann

== Casts (1970s-2000s) ==
| Character | Out of Town Tryout at The MUNY | Original Broadway Production | Kenley Players Production | Florida Tour | Nottingham Playhouse Production | Kenley Players Production | Paper Mill Playhouse Production | Original West End Production | Barrington Stage Company Production | Reprise Theatre Company Production | Australian Production | Goodspeed Musicals Production | UK Regional Revival | West End Revival | 42nd Street Moon Concert |
| Character | 1974 | | 1975 | 1976 | 1981 | 1984 | 1988 | 1995 | 1999 | 2000 | 2001 | 2004 | 2005 | 2006 | |
|---|---|---|---|---|---|---|---|---|---|---|---|---|---|---|---|
| Mack Sennett | Robert Preston | Robert Preston | Terence Monk | David Cryer | Denis Quilley | Lee Horsley | Lee Horsley | Howard McGillin | Jeff McCarthy | Douglas Sills | John Diedrich | Scott Waara | David Soul | David Soul | Bill Fahrner |
| Mabel Normand | Bernadette Peters | Bernadette Peters | Karen Morrow | Lucie Arnaz | Imelda Staunton | Valerie Lee | Janet Metz | Caroline O'Connor | Kelli Rabke | Jane Krakowski | Caroline O'Connor | Christiane Noll | Janie Dee | Janie Dee | Cindy Goldfield |
| Lottie Ames | Lisa Kirk | Lisa Kirk | Laura Waterbury | Marilyn Cooper | Carol Ball | Karen Prunczik | Dorothy Stanley | Kathryn Evans | Kathryn Kendall | Donna McKechnie | Leonie Page | Donna McKechnie | ? | Sarah Whittuck | Amy Louise Cole |
| William Desmond Taylor | James Mitchell | James Mitchell | Ted Pritchard | John Stewart | Marc Urquhart | Frank Echols | Ed Evanko | Ray Scott-Johnson | Peter Kapetan | Lane Davies | Joe Petruzzi | Gary Lindemann | ? | Richard Brightiff | Michael Patrick Gafney |
| Kleiman (Adam Kessel) | Tom Batten | Tom Batten | ? | John Anania | Gary Lyons | Bob Moak | Stan Rubin | Graham Hubbard | Robert Anderson | Lenny Wolpe | Troy Sussman | Steve Pudenz | ? | Robert Pirongs | ? |
| Mr. Fox (Charles O. Baumann) | Bert Michaels | Bert Michaels | ? | ? | Ron Berglas | Michael Sartor | Marvin Einhorn | Alan Mosley | Michael J. Farina | Gus Corrado | Mark Dickinson | Gus Corrado | ? | Jon Trenchard | ? |
| Frank Wyman (Frank Capra) | Jerry Dodge | Jerry Dodge | Tommy Tune | Jess Richards | Michael Remick | Dick Fuchs | Scott Ellis | Jonathan D. Ellis | Will Erat | Chad Borden | Tyran Parke | Zachary Halley | ? | Tomm Coles | Steve Rhyne |
| Fatty (Roscoe “Fatty” Arbuckle) | Christopher Murney (as Charlie Muldoon) | Christopher Murney (as Charlie Muldoon) | —N/a | —N/a | —N/a | —N/a | Ric Stoneback | Philip Herbert | Ric Stoneback | Robert Machray | ? | Robert Machray | ? | Matthew Woodyatt | Sean Patrick Murtagh |
| Eddie | Stanley Simmonds | Stanley Simmonds | ? | Stanley Simmonds | Thom Booker | David Williams | Michael Ricardo | Andrew Wright (as Harry) | ? | Paul De Vecchio (as Watchman) | ? | ? | ? | Robert Cousins | ? |
| Wally | Robert Fitch | Robert Fitch | ? | Tommy Tune | Edward Wiley | Bill Clayton | Frank DiPasquale (as Freddie) | Matthew Finch (as Freddie) | ? | ? | ? | ? | ? | ? | ? |
| Ella | Nancy C. Evers | Nancy C. Evers | ? | Dorothy Opalach | Anne Gabrielle | Jill Hayman | Nancy C. Evers | Julia Parrott | Natalie Sliko | Cindy Benson | Robyn Arthur | Jessica Anderson | ? | ? | ? |

=== Notable Replacements ===
==== Original Broadway Production (1974) ====
- Charlie Muldoon: Lonnie Burr (u/s)

==== Paper Mill Playhouse Production (1988) ====
- Mack Sennett: Ed Evanko (u/s)

==== Original West End Production (1995) ====
- Mack Sennett: James Smillie
- Mabel Normand: Jessica Martin

== Casts (2010s-2020s) ==
| Character | Southwark Playhouse Production | Chichester Festival Theatre Production | Encores! Production | All Roads Theatre Company Production |
| Character | 2012 | 2015 | 2020 | 2024 |
|---|---|---|---|---|
| Mack Sennett | Norman Bowman | Michael Ball | Douglas Sills | Dermot Mulroney |
| Mabel Normand | Laura Pitt-Pulford | Rebecca LaChance | Alexandra Socha | Jenna Lea Rosen |
| Lottie Ames | Jessica Martin | Anna-Jane Casey | Lilli Cooper | Caroline O'Connor |
| William Desmond Taylor | Peter Kenworthy | Mark Inscoe | Michael Berresse | Chad Doreck |
| Kleiman (Adam Kessel) | Steven Serlin | Timothy Quinlan | Jordan Gelber | Robert Yacko |
| Mr. Fox (Charles O. Baumann) | ? | Alex Giannini | Allen Lewis Rickman | Glenn Rosenblum |
| Frank Wyman (Frank Capra) | Stuart Matthew Price | Gunnar Cauthery | Ben Fankhauser | Lee James |
| Fatty (Roscoe “Fatty” Arbuckle) | Richard J. Hunt | Jack Edwards | Major Attaway | Arthur L. Ross |
| Eddie | Anthony Wise | Joseph Prouse | Kevin Ligon | Michael Shepperd (as Watchman) |
| Wally | ? | Joseph Prouse (as Freddie) | Evan Kasprzak (as Freddie) | ? |
| Ella | Jody Ellen Robinson | Rebecca Louis | Janet Noh | Myriam Ali |

== Critical response ==
The Broadway reviews were only fair. Walter Kerr, in his review for The New York Times wrote, "I have rarely seen so much talent so dispirited as the creative souls peering through the gloom at the Majestic ... librettist Michael Stewart ... has chosen to lean on the myth of Mack and Mabel, let the mysteries stand, invented no emotional line." He wrote of Gower Champion, "A choreographer ought to be able to do something with bodies. ... Mr. Champion doesn't set about his task that way ... [he] has not only avoided dance as a means of intimating a difficult kind of comedy, he has been stingy and even sluggish with the footwork that does crop up to decorate the songs. ... Production values everywhere are minimal." He noted that "Robert Preston's personal dynamism isn't diminished, it's just restively lying in wait for the solid meat he could handle if only there were a good provider around" and that "Miss Peters ... is close to touching in her quiet reminder that what Mr. Preston started in 1911 may be over and done with in 1923."

According to Kenneth Bloom, Mack & Mabel was "The saddest failure of Jerry Herman's career". It was a "victim of its time, an era when rock musicals were preferred over traditional musical comedy scores. Deep at its core was a simple love story and an exceptionally appropriate score. The urge to turn what could have been a bittersweet drama into a huge musical comedy was fatal."

== Awards and nominations ==
=== Original Broadway production ===
| Year | Award | Category | Nominee | Result |
|---|---|---|---|---|
| 1975 | Tony Award | Best Musical | | Nominated |
| 1975 | Tony Award | Best Book of a Musical | Michael Stewart | Nominated |
| 1975 | Tony Award | Best Performance by a Leading Actor in a Musical | Robert Preston | Nominated |
| 1975 | Tony Award | Best Performance by a Leading Actress in a Musical | Bernadette Peters | Nominated |
| 1975 | Tony Award | Best Scenic Design | Robin Wagner | Nominated |
| 1975 | Tony Award | Best Costume Design | Patricia Zipprodt | Nominated |
| 1975 | Tony Award | Best Choreography | Gower Champion | Nominated |
| 1975 | Tony Award | Best Direction of a Musical | Gower Champion | Nominated |
| 1975 | Drama Desk Award | Outstanding Actor in a Musical | Robert Preston | Nominated |
| 1975 | Drama Desk Award | Outstanding Actress in a Musical | Bernadette Peters | Nominated |
| 1975 | Drama Desk Award | Outstanding Music | Jerry Herman | Nominated |
| 1975 | Drama Desk Award | Outstanding Lyrics | Jerry Herman | Nominated |

=== Original London production ===
| Year | Award | Category | Nominee | Result |
|---|---|---|---|---|
| 1996 | Laurence Olivier Award | Best New Musical | | Nominated |
| 1996 | Laurence Olivier Award | Best Actress in a Musical | Caroline O'Connor | Nominated |
