= Reliance Film Company =

American film studio

Reliance Film Company (1910–1915) was an early movie production studio in the United States. It was established in 1910 in Coney Island by Adam Kessel Jr. and Charles O. Baumann.

Harry Aitken purchased the Reliance Film Company in 1911 from Charles O. Baumann. It also went by the name the Reliance Motion Picture Company.

== History ==
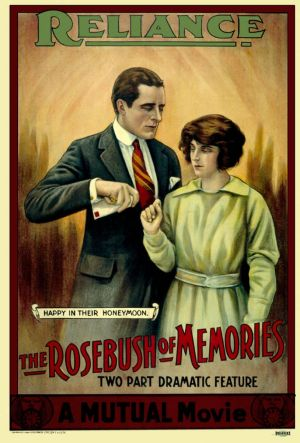
Poster for The Rose Bush of Memories (1914)

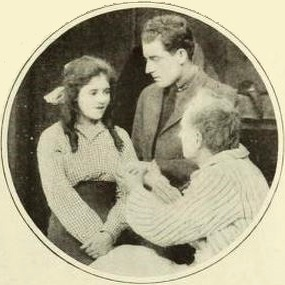
Still from the American western film Sympathy Sal (1915) with Teddy Sampson

Reliance Film Company was founded in 1910 by Adam Kessel Jr. and Charles O. Baumann in Coney Island in Brooklyn, New York City. It was a subsidiary of the New York Motion Picture Company. They were also the founders of the Bison Film Company on the West Coast.

In 1911, Baumann stepped down from leadership at the company in order to focus more time at the Bison Film Company; control and management was succeeded by J. V. Ritchey and J. C. Graham. From 1910 until 1912, Kessel and Baumann were joined at the company by Phillips Smalley and Lois Weber, both were actors and filmmakers.

The studio took over the offices of the Sanford White studio in Manhattan. It also operated a 10,000 sq ft factory on Coney Island. It published The Film, a weekly. Actor Max Davidson portrayed the character 'Izzy' in a series of Reliance films shorts in 1914.

== Filmography ==
- A Brass Button (1911)
- Her Son (1911)
- Jealousy (1912 film)
- Votes for Women (film) (1912), about women's suffrage produced in partnership with the National American Woman Suffrage Association
- The Rose Bush of Memories (1914)
- The Huron Converts (1915) with Joseph Henabery
- Man (1913 film), a Reliance film directed by Oscar Apfel starring James Ashley, Gertrude Robinson
- Before the White Man Came
- At Cripple Creek
- The Victoria Cross (1912 film) (The Charge of the Light Brigade), directed by Hal Reid
- Duty and the Man (1913)
- A Man's Duty
- The Secret Service Man
- Curfew Shall Not Ring Tonight (1912)
- His Mother's Son (1913)
- Kaintuck (1912), a Kaintuck is a native of Kentucky
- Virginius (film) (1912), based on the play by James Sheridan Knowles
- The Second Mrs. Roebuck (1914)
- The Great Leap; Until Death Do Us Part (1914)
- The Three Brothers (1915 film) (1915)
- Station Content (1915 film) (1915)
- The Craven (1915)
- Runaway June (1915), serial film starring Norma Phillips
- Sympathy Sal (1915)
- The Outlaw's Revenge (1915)
- Up from the Depths (1915)
- Macbeth
- Rosanna's Dream
- Solomon's Son
- When Men Love
- Invasion of the Wilderness
- The Girl Who Waited
- The Reckoning
