= Brass buttons =

Brass buttons may refer to:

- A Yorkshire idiom, meaning someone has no money, i.e. "And pay with what? Brass buttons"?
- Cotula coronopifolia, a small marsh flower
- A Brass Button, a 1911 American film
- Brass Buttons, a 1919 American comedy film directed by Henry King
- "Brass Buttons", a song by Gram Parsons from the album Grievous Angel
