= Universal Pictures =

American film and distribution company

Universal City Studios LLC
- Logo used since 2012 (Note: Current logo used since 2013. Originally designed by Wētā FX, the modified version was designed by Brian Jackson.)

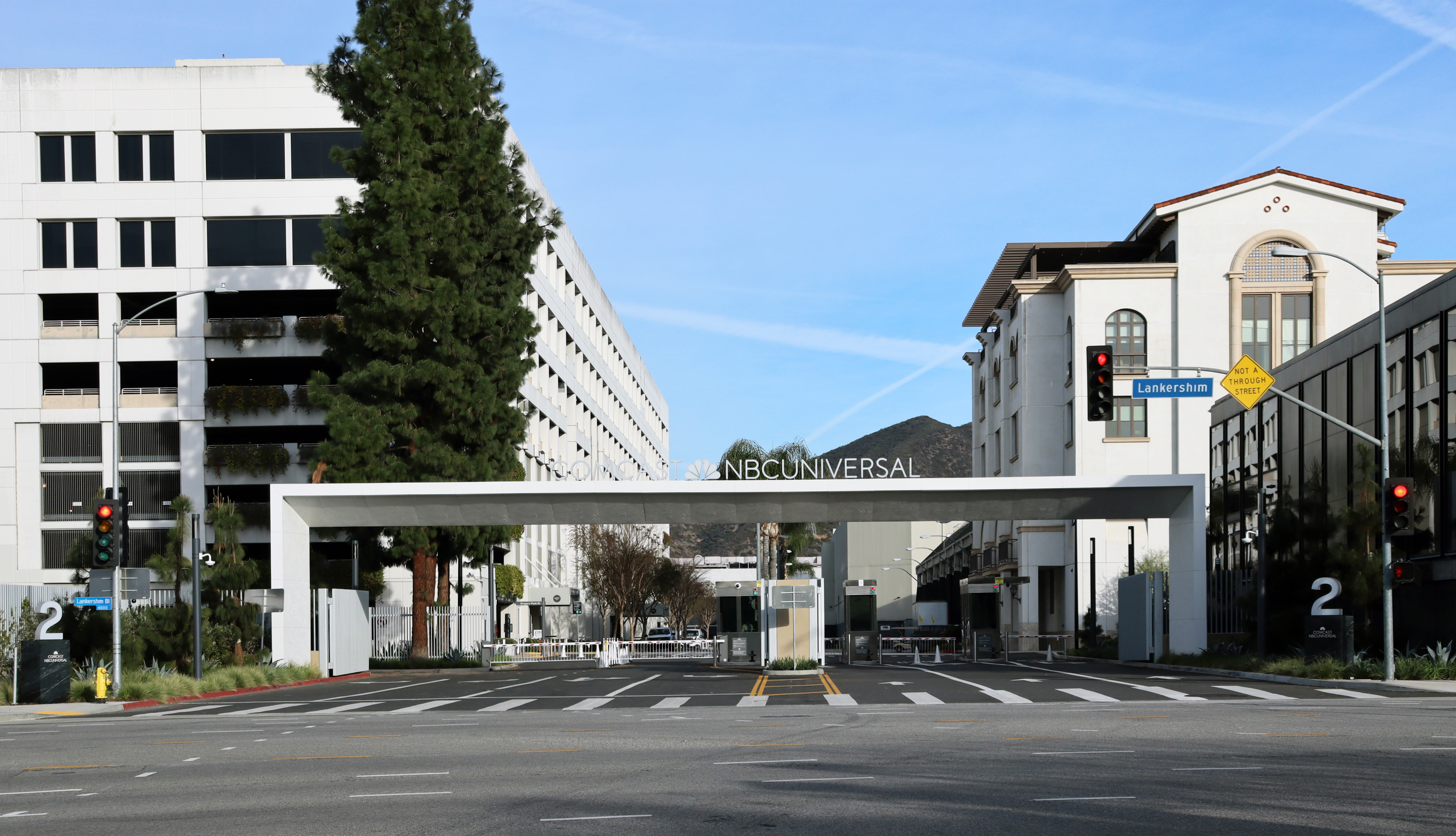
- Universal Studios Lot in Universal City, California, photographed February 16, 2025.
- Trade name: Universal Pictures
- Formerly: List: Universal Film Manufacturing Company (1912–1923); Universal Pictures Corporation (1923–1936); Universal Productions, Inc. (1936–1937); Universal Pictures Company, Inc. (1937–1947); Universal-International (1946–1963); Universal City Studios, Inc. (1963–2002); Universal City Studios LLLP (2002–2011)
- Type: Division
- Industry: Film
- Predecessor: Independent Moving Pictures
- Founded: April 30, 1912; 114 years ago
- Founders: Carl Laemmle; Pat Powers; David Horsley; William Swanson; Mark Dintenfass; Charles Baumann; Robert H. Cochrane; Adam Kessel; Jules Brulatour
- Headquarters: 10 Universal City Plaza, Universal City, California, U.S.
- Number of locations: 3
- Area served: Worldwide
- Key people: Donna Langley (chairwoman, Universal Filmed Entertainment Group) Peter Cramer (president)
- Products: Motion pictures
- Services: Film distribution; Film promotion; Film production
- Revenue: ▲US$11.622 billion (2022)
- Parent: MCA Inc. (1962–1996); Universal Filmed Entertainment Group (1996–present)
- Divisions: Focus Features; Illumination; Universal Pictures Home Entertainment
- Subsidiaries: Amblin Partners (20%); DreamWorks Animation; NBCUniversal Entertainment Japan; United International Pictures; Working Title Films
- Website: universalpictures.com

Universal City Studios LLC (doing business as Universal Pictures), commonly known as Universal Studios or simply Universal, is an American film production and distribution company headquartered at the Universal Studios complex in Universal City, California. It serves as the flagship studio of Universal Filmed Entertainment Group, the film studio arm of NBCUniversal, which is a subsidiary of Comcast.

Founded on April 30, 1912, by Carl Laemmle, Mark Dintenfass, Charles O. Baumann, Adam Kessel, Pat Powers, William Swanson, David Horsley, Robert H. Cochrane, and Jules Brulatour, Universal is the oldest surviving film studio in the United States and the fifth oldest globally after Gaumont, Pathé, Titanus and Nordisk Film, and is one of the "Big Four" film studios.

Universal Pictures is a member of the Motion Picture Association (MPA), and was one of the "Little Three" majors during Hollywood's golden age. It is currently one of eight film studios of the Universal Filmed Entertainment Group, alongside Focus Features, a 20% stake in Amblin Partners, a 50% stake in United International Pictures, Working Title Films, Universal Animation Studios, Illumination, and DreamWorks Animation.

Woody Woodpecker, a cartoon character created by Walter Lantz, serves as the company's mascot.

== History ==
=== Early years ===
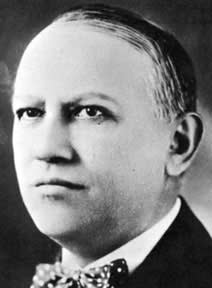
Carl Laemmle (1867–1939)

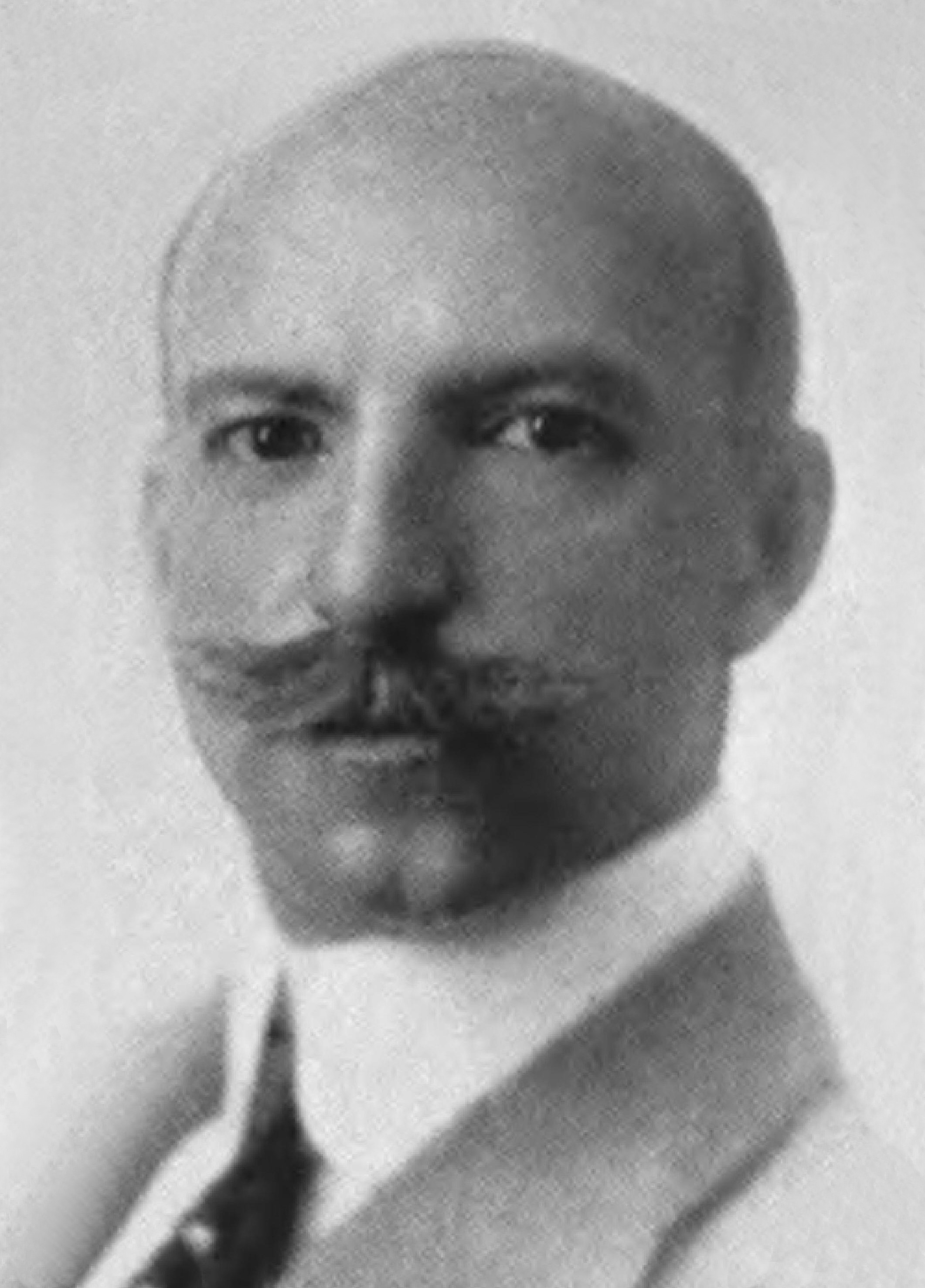
Mark Dintenfass (1872–1933), co-founder of Universal

Universal was founded by Carl Laemmle, Mark Dintenfass, Charles O. Baumann, Adam Kessel, Pat Powers, William Swanson, David Horsley, Robert H. Cochrane (Note: Robert H. Cochrane (1879–1973) formed the Cochrane Advertising Agency in Chicago in 1904. He joined the Laemmle Film Service as advertising manager in 1906 and, for the next 30 years, devoted himself to promoting Carl Laemmle as the "star" of various motion picture enterprises. In 1912 Cochrane was elected vice-president of the Universal Film Manufacturing Company and served as president of Universal in 1936–37 after Laemmle sold his interests.) and Jules Brulatour. One story has Laemmle watching a box office for hours, counting patrons, and calculating the day's takings. Within weeks of his Chicago trip, Laemmle gave up dry goods to buy the first several nickelodeons. For Laemmle and other such entrepreneurs, the creation in 1908 of the Edison-backed Motion Picture Patents Company (or the "Edison Trust") meant that exhibitors were expected to pay fees for Trust-produced films they showed. Based on the Latham Loop used in cameras and projectors, along with other patents, the Trust collected fees on all aspects of movie production and exhibition and attempted to enforce a monopoly on distribution.

Soon, Laemmle and other disgruntled nickelodeon owners decided to avoid paying Edison by producing their own pictures. In June 1909, Laemmle started the Yankee Film Company with his brothers-in-law Abe Stern and Julius Stern. That company quickly evolved into the Independent Moving Pictures Company (IMP), with studios in Fort Lee, New Jersey, where many early films in America's first motion picture industry were produced in the early 20th century. Laemmle broke with Edison's custom of refusing to give billing and screen credits to performers. By naming the movie stars, he attracted many of the leading players of the time, contributing to the creation of the star system. In 1910, he promoted Florence Lawrence, formerly known as "The Biograph Girl", and actor King Baggot, in what may be the first instance of a studio using stars in its marketing.

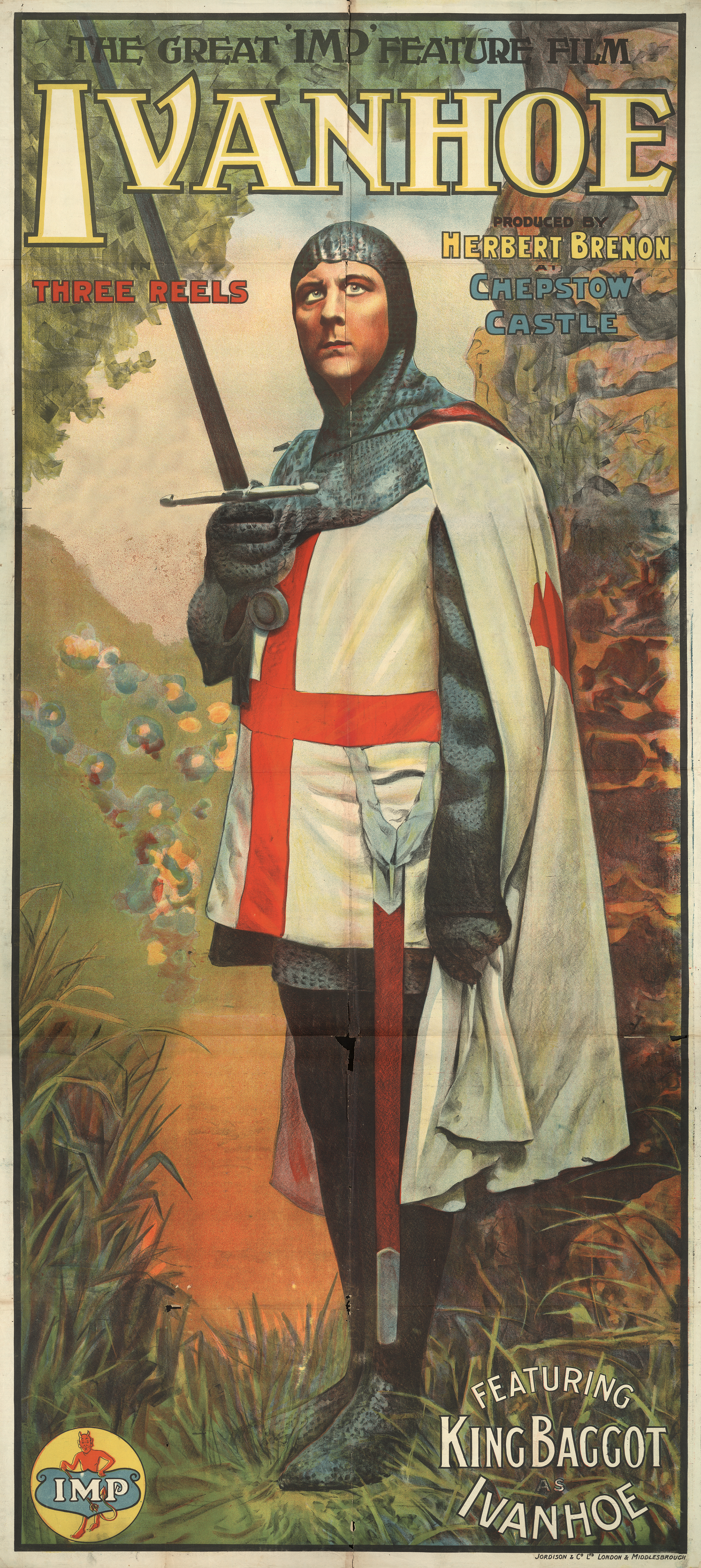
Poster for Ivanhoe (1913)

The Universal Film Manufacturing Company was incorporated in New York City on April 30, 1912. Laemmle, who emerged as president in July 1912, was the primary figure in the partnership with Dintenfass, Baumann, Kessel, Powers, Swanson, Horsley, and Brulatour. The company was established on June 8, 1912, formed in a merger of Independent Moving Pictures (IMP), the Powers Motion Picture Company, Rex Motion Picture Manufacturing Company, Champion Film Company, Nestor Film Company, and the New York Motion Picture Company. Eventually all would be bought out by Laemmle. The new Universal studio was a vertically integrated company, with movie production, distribution, and exhibition venues all linked in the same corporate entity, the central element of the Studio system era.

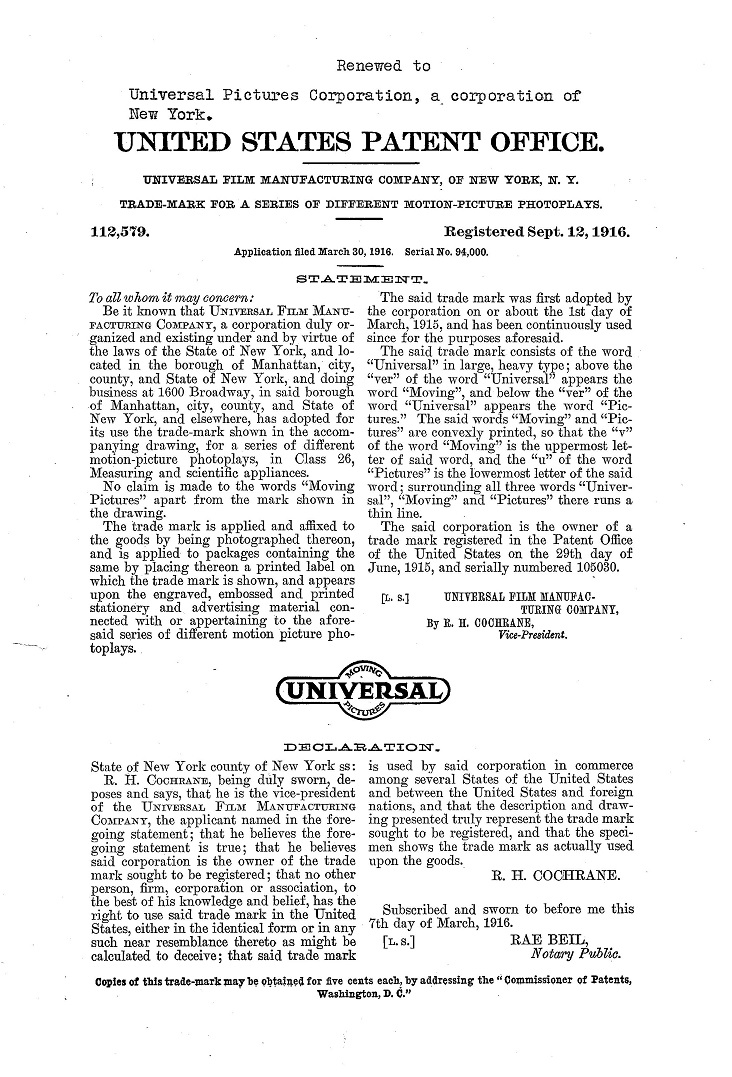
Trademark for Universal Moving Pictures, September 12, 1916

Melodrama A Great Love (1916) by Clifford S. Elfelt for Universal Big U. Dutch intertitles, 12:33. Collection EYE Film Institute Netherlands.

Following the westward trend of the industry, by the end of 1912, the company was focusing its production efforts in the Hollywood area.

Universal Weekly and Moving Picture Weekly were the alternating names of Universal's internal magazine that began publication in this era; the magazine was intended to market Universal's films to exhibitors. Since much of Universal's early film output was destroyed in subsequent fires and nitrate degradation, the surviving issues of these magazines are a crucial source for film historians.

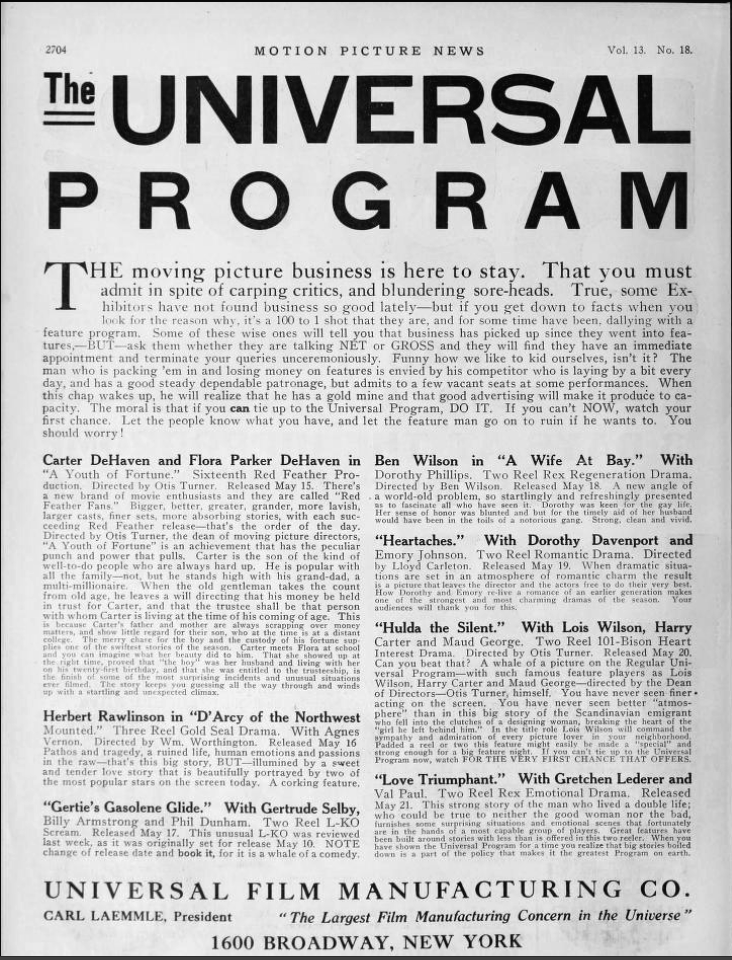
Universal advertisement touting the benefit of the studio's short films to theater operators

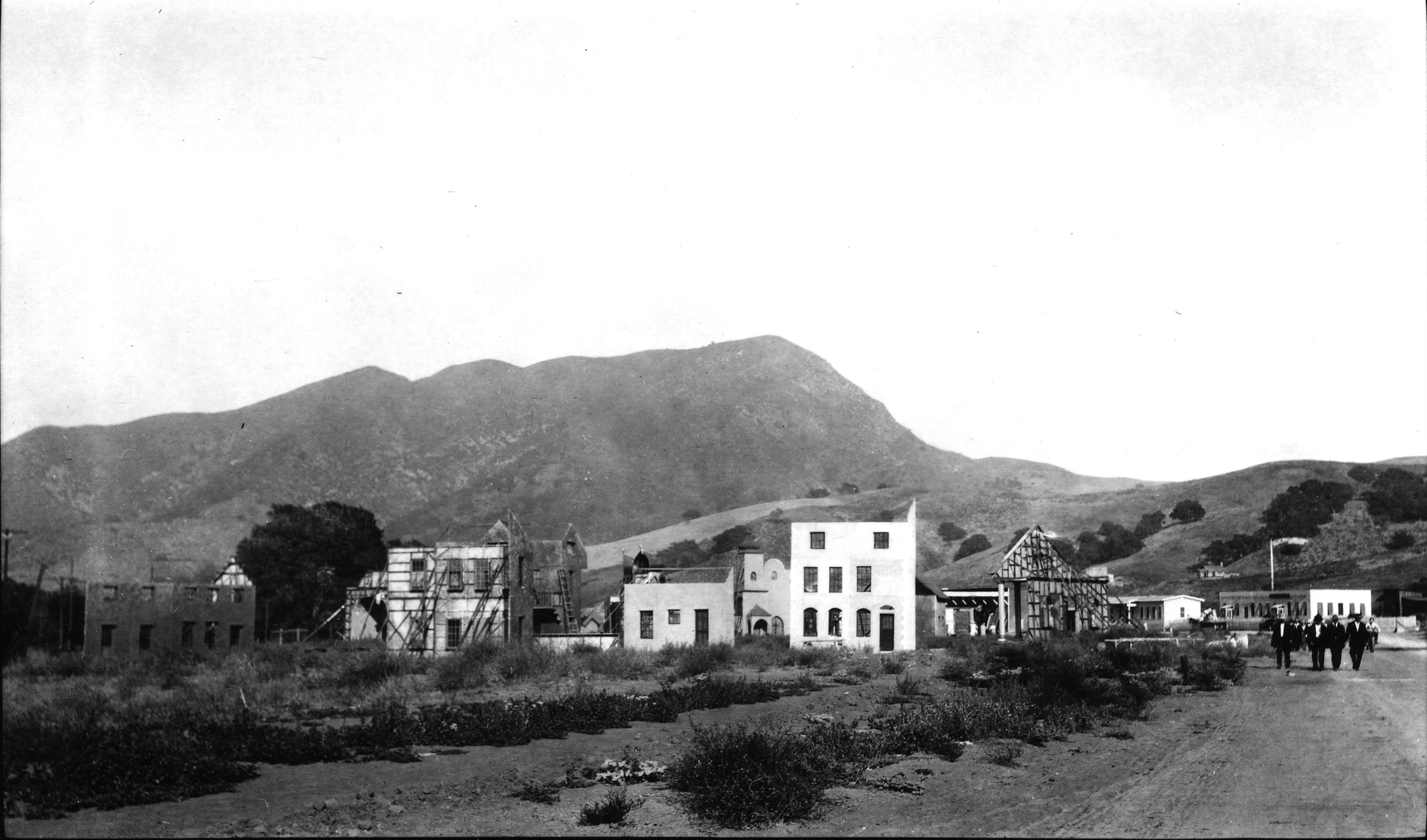
Universal Pictures film sets photographed 1915

On March 15, 1915, Laemmle opened the world's largest motion picture production facility, Universal City Studios, on a 230-acre (0.9-km^{2}) converted farm just over the Cahuenga Pass from Hollywood. Studio management became the third facet of Universal's operations, with the studio incorporated as a distinct subsidiary organization. Unlike other movie moguls, Laemmle opened his studio to tourists. Universal became the largest studio in Hollywood and remained so for a decade. However, it sought an audience mostly in small towns, producing mostly inexpensive melodramas, westerns, and serials.

In 1916, Universal formed a three-tier branding system for their releases. Unlike the top-tier studios, Universal did not own any theaters to market its feature films. Universal branding its product gave theater owners and audiences a quick reference guide. Branding would help theater owners judge films they were about to lease and help fans decide which movies they wanted to see. Universal released three different types of feature motion pictures:

- Red Feather Photoplays – low-budget feature films
- Bluebird Photoplays – mainstream feature release and more ambitious productions
- Jewel – prestige motion pictures featuring high budgets using prominent actors

Directors of "Jewel" films included Jack Conway, John Ford, Rex Ingram, Robert Z. Leonard, George Marshall, and Lois Weber, one of the few women directing films in Hollywood.

Starting in the mid-1920s, Universal branded its most expensive and heavily promoted feature films as "Super-Jewel" productions. These included films such as Erich von Stroheim's Foolish Wives (1922), Clarence Brown's The Acquittal (1923), Hobart Henley's A Lady of Quality (1924), Harry A. Pollard's Uncle Tom's Cabin (1927), and Edward Sloman's Surrender (1927).

Despite Laemmle's role as an innovator, he was an extremely cautious studio chief. Unlike rivals Adolph Zukor, William Fox, and Marcus Loew, Laemmle chose not to develop a theater chain. He also financed all of his own films, refusing to take on debt. This policy nearly bankrupted the studio when actor-director Erich von Stroheim insisted on excessively lavish production values for his films Blind Husbands (1919) and Foolish Wives (1922), but Universal shrewdly gained a return on some of the expenditure by launching a sensational ad campaign that attracted moviegoers. Character actor Lon Chaney became a drawing card for Universal in the mid-1910s, appearing steadily in dramas. However, Chaney left Universal in 1917 due to a salary dispute, and his two biggest hits for Universal were made as isolated returns to the studio: The Hunchback of Notre Dame (1923) and The Phantom of the Opera (1925).

During the early 1920s Laemmle entrusted most of Universal's production policy decisions to Irving Thalberg. Thalberg had been Laemmle's personal secretary, and Laemmle was impressed by his cogent observations of how efficiently the studio could be operated. Promoted to studio chief in 1919, Thalberg made distinct improvements of quality and prestige in Universal's output in addition to dealing with star director Erich von Stroheim's increasing inability to control the expense and length of his films, eventually firing Stroheim on October 6, 1922, six weeks into the production of Merry-Go-Round (1923) and replacing him with Rupert Julian. Louis B. Mayer lured Thalberg away from Universal in late 1922 to his own growing studio, Louis B. Mayer Productions, as vice-president in charge of production, and when Metro-Goldwyn-Mayer was formed in 1924 Thalberg continued in the same position for the new company. Without Thalberg's guidance, Universal became a second-tier studio and would remain so for several decades.

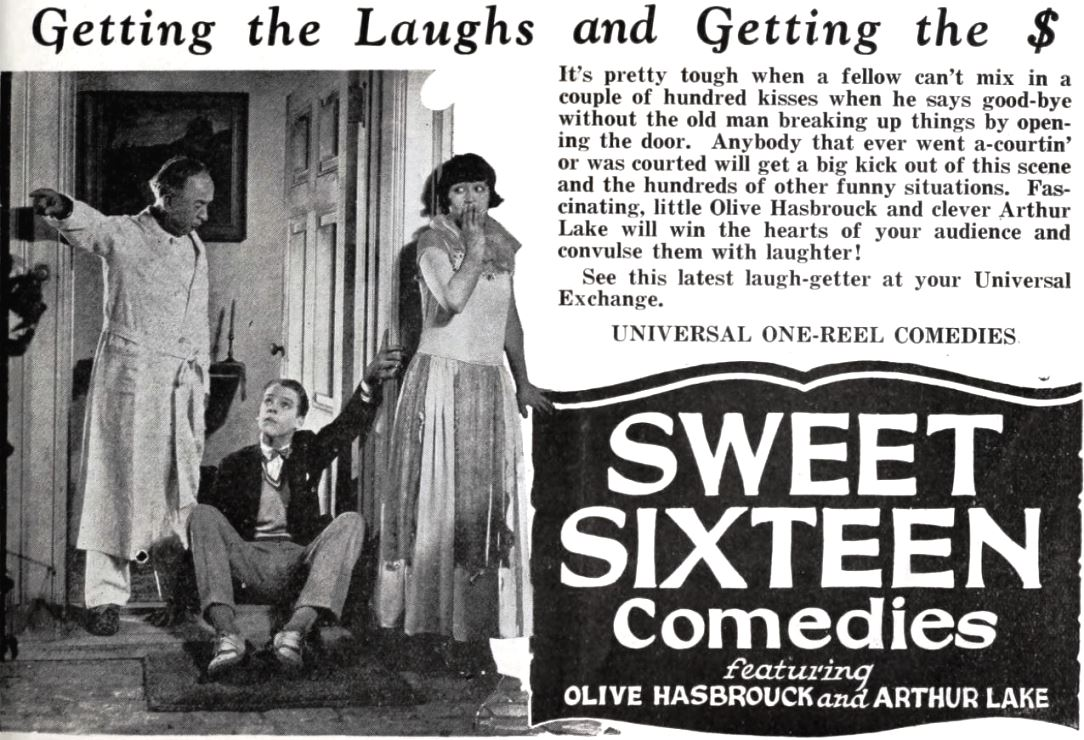
Advertisement for comedy short films with Arthur Lake and Olive Hasbrouck

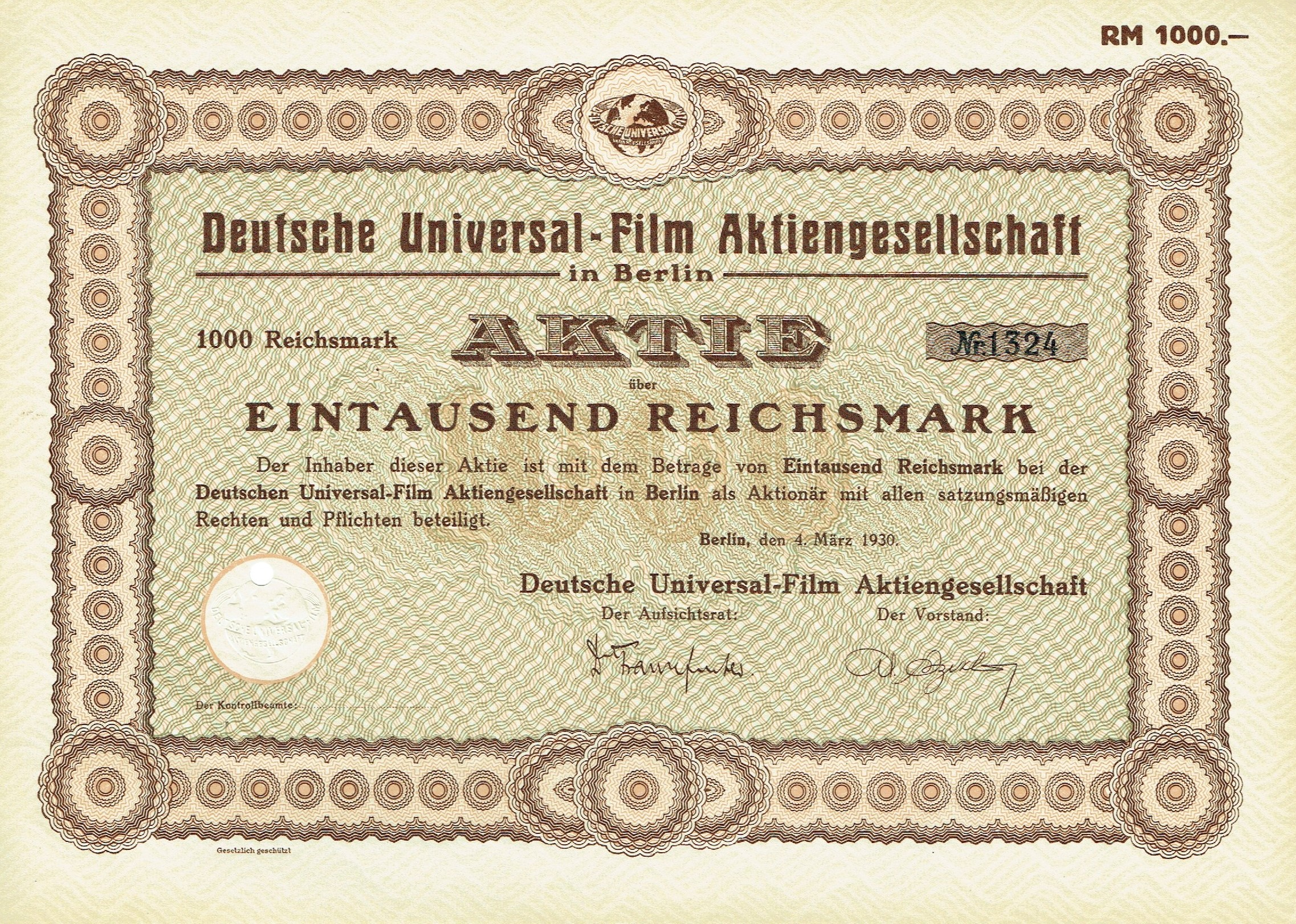
Share of the Deutsche Universal-Film AG, issued March 4, 1930

In 1926, Universal opened a production unit in Germany, Deutsche Universal-Film AG, under the direction of Joe Pasternak. This unit produced three to four films per year until 1936, migrating to Hungary and then Austria in the face of Hitler's increasing domination of central Europe. With the advent of sound, these productions were made in the German language or, occasionally, Hungarian or Polish. In the U.S., Universal Pictures did not distribute any of this subsidiary's films. Still, some of them were exhibited through other independent, foreign-language film distributors based in New York City without the benefit of English subtitles. Nazi persecution and a change in ownership for the parent Universal Pictures organization resulted in the dissolution of this subsidiary.

In the early years, Universal had a "clean picture" policy. However, by April 1927, Carl Laemmle considered this a mistake as "unclean pictures" from other studios generated more profit while Universal lost money.

In early 1927, Universal had been negotiating deals with cartoon producers since they wanted to get back into producing them. On March 4, Charles Mintz's Winkler Pictures signed a contract with Universal in the presence of its vice president, R. H. Cochrane. Winkler was to produce 26 "Oswald the Lucky Rabbit" cartoons for Universal. Walt Disney and Ub Iwerks created the character and Disney's studio provided the animation for the cartoons under Winkler's supervision.

The films enjoyed a successful theatrical run, and Mintz would sign a contract with Universal ensuring three more years of Oswald cartoons. However, after Mintz had unsuccessfully demanded that Disney accept a lower fee for producing the films, Mintz took most of Walt's animators to work at his own studio. Disney and Iwerks would create Mickey Mouse in secret while they finished the remaining Oswald films they were contractually obligated to finish. Universal subsequently terminated Winkler's contract and formed its own in-house animation studio headed by Walter Lantz and Bill Nolan. Lantz subsequently bought out the studio, after which he maintained connections with Universal and found success with Woody Woodpecker in 1940.

In February 2006, NBCUniversal sold all the Disney-animated Oswald cartoons, along with the rights and trademark to the character himself, to The Walt Disney Company. In return, Disney released ABC sportscaster Al Michaels from his contract so he could work on NBC's recently acquired Sunday night NFL football package. Universal retained ownership of the remaining Oswald cartoons.

=== Keeping leadership of the studio in the family ===
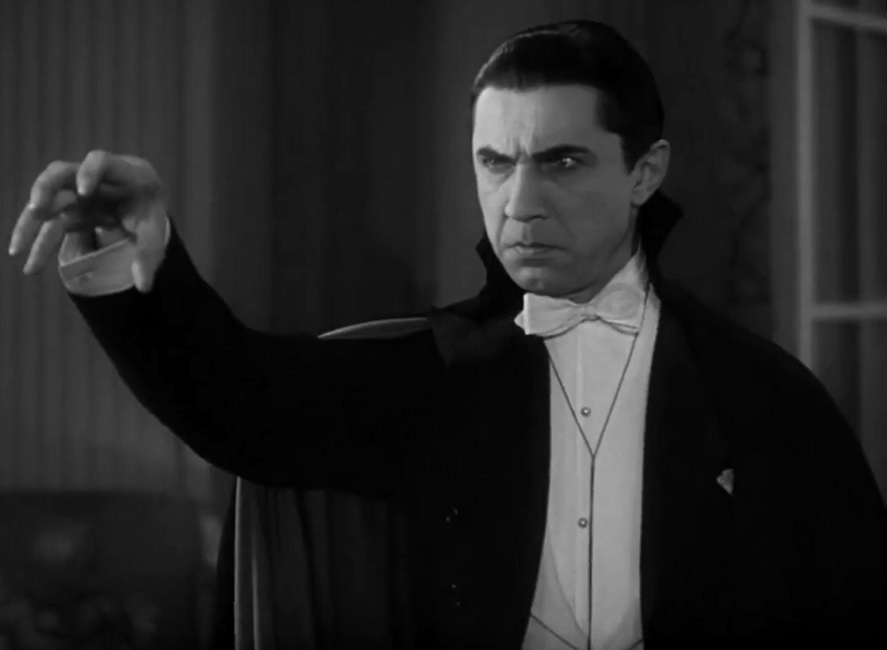
Bela Lugosi in Dracula (1931)

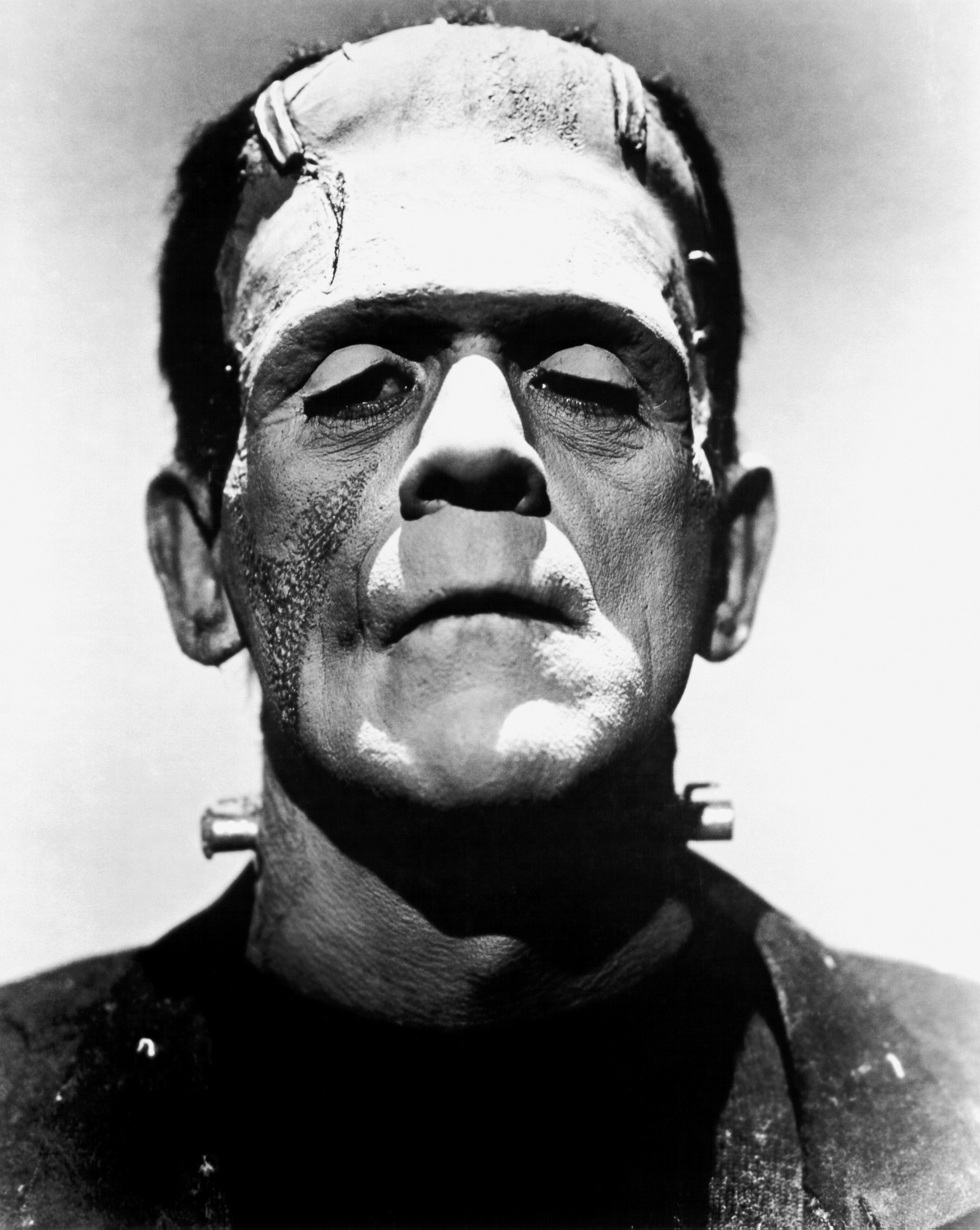
Boris Karloff in Bride of Frankenstein (1935)

In 1928, Laemmle Sr. made his son, Carl Jr., head of Universal Pictures, a 21st birthday present. Universal already had a reputation for nepotism—at one time, 70 of Carl Sr.'s relatives were supposedly on the payroll. Many of them were nephews, resulting in Carl Sr. being known around the studios as "Uncle Carl". Ogden Nash famously quipped in rhyme, "Uncle Carl Laemmle/Has a very large faemmle". Among these relatives was future Academy Award-winning director/producer William Wyler.

"Junior," Laemmle persuaded his father to bring Universal up to date. He bought and built theaters, converted the studio to sound production, and made several forays into high-quality production. His early efforts included the critically panned part-talkie version of Edna Ferber's novel Show Boat (1929), the lavish musical Broadway (1929) which included Technicolor sequences; and the first all-color musical feature (for Universal), King of Jazz (1930). The more serious All Quiet on the Western Front (1930) won its year's Best Picture Oscar.

Laemmle Jr. created a niche for the studio, beginning a series of horror films which extended into the 1940s, affectionately dubbed Universal horror. Among them are Dracula (1931), Frankenstein (1931), The Mummy (1932) and The Invisible Man (1933). Other Laemmle productions of this period include Tay Garnett's Destination Unknown (1933), John M. Stahl's Imitation of Life (1934) and William Wyler's The Good Fairy (1935).

=== The Laemmles lose control ===
Universal's forays into high-quality production spelled the end of the Laemmle era at the studio. Taking on the task of modernizing and upgrading a film conglomerate in the depths of the Great Depression was risky, and for a time, Universal slipped into receivership. The theater chain was scrapped, but Carl Jr. held fast to distribution, studio, and production operations.

The end for the Laemmles came with a lavish version of Show Boat (1936), a remake of its earlier 1929 part-talkie production, and produced as a high-quality, big-budget film rather than as a B-picture. The new film featured several stars from the Broadway stage version, which began production in late 1935, and unlike the 1929 film, was based on the Broadway musical rather than the novel. Carl Jr.'s spending habits alarmed company stockholders. They would not allow production to start on Show Boat unless the Laemmles obtained a loan. Universal was forced to seek a $750,000 production loan from the Standard Capital Corporation, pledging the Laemmle family's controlling interest in Universal as collateral. It was the first time Universal had borrowed money for a production in its 26-year history. The production went $300,000 over budget; Standard called in the loan, cash-strapped Universal could not pay, and Standard foreclosed and seized control of the studio on April 2, 1936.

Although Universal's 1936 Show Boat (released a little over a month later) became a critical and financial success, it was not enough to save the Laemmles' involvement with the studio. They were unceremoniously removed from the company they had founded, with studio advertisements referring to "the new Universal". Because the Laemmles personally oversaw production, Show Boat was released (despite the takeover) with Carl Laemmle and Carl Laemmle Jr.'s names on the credits and in the film's advertising campaign. Standard Capital's J. Cheever Cowdin had taken over as president and chairman of the board of directors and instituted severe cuts in production budgets. Joining him were British entrepreneurs C.M. Woolf and J. Arthur Rank, who bought a significant stake in the studio. Gone were the big ambitions, and though Universal had a few big names under contract, those it had been cultivating, like William Wyler and Margaret Sullavan, left.

Meanwhile, producer Joe Pasternak, who had been successfully producing light musicals with young sopranos for Universal's German subsidiary, repeated his formula in the United States. Teenage singer Deanna Durbin starred in Pasternak's first American film, Three Smart Girls (1936). The film was a box-office hit and reputedly resolved the studio's financial problems. The film's success led Universal to offer her a contract, which for the first five years of her career, produced her most successful pictures.

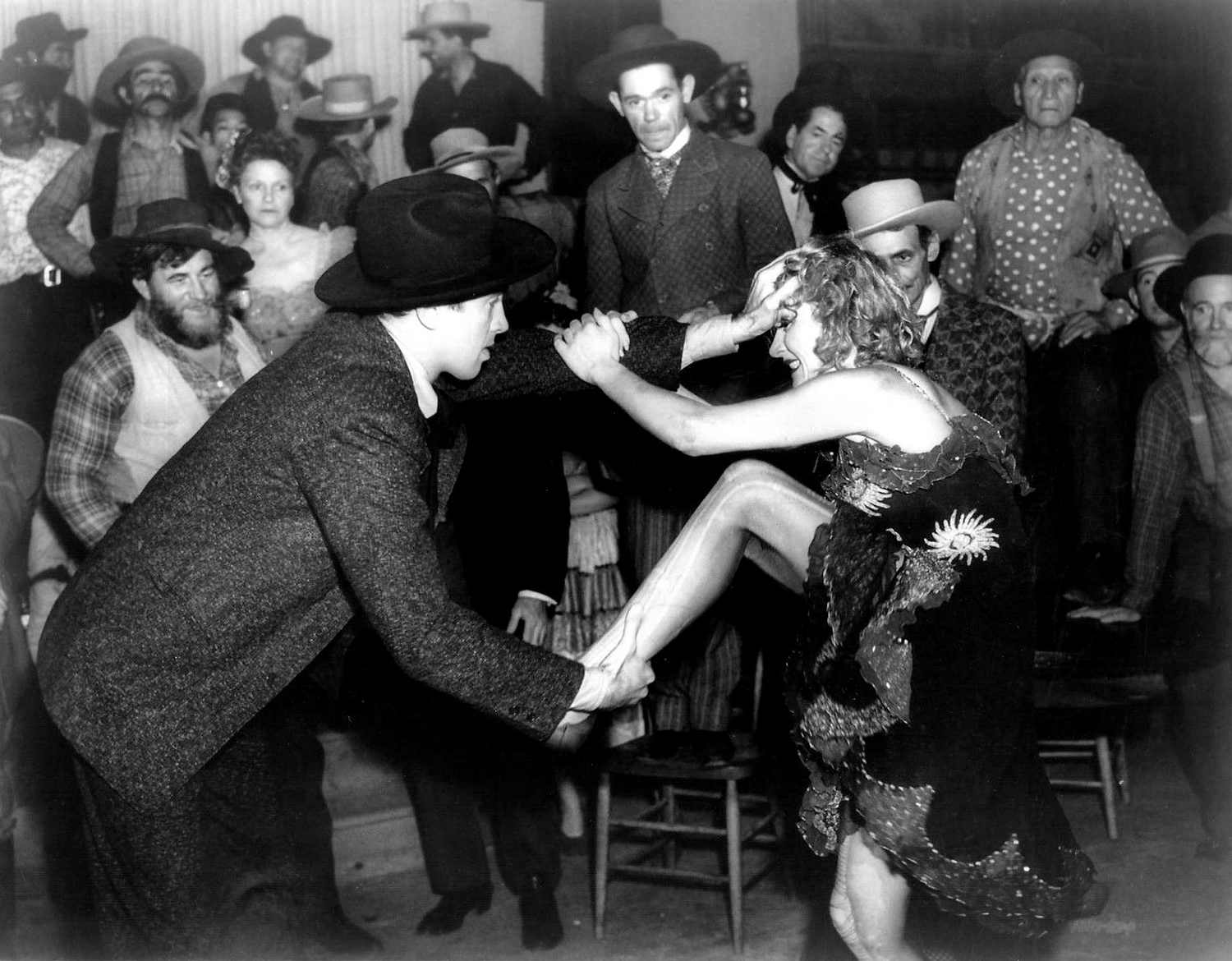
James Stewart and Marlene Dietrich in Destry Rides Again (1939)

When Pasternak stopped producing Durbin's pictures, and she outgrew her screen persona and pursued more dramatic roles, the studio signed 13-year-old Gloria Jean for her own series of Pasternak musicals from 1939; she went on to star with Bing Crosby, W. C. Fields, and Donald O'Connor. A popular Universal film of the late 1930s was Destry Rides Again (1939), starring James Stewart as Destry and Marlene Dietrich in her comeback role after leaving Paramount.

By the early 1940s, the company was concentrating on lower-budget productions that were the company's main staple: westerns, melodramas, serials, and sequels to the studio's horror pictures, the latter now solely B pictures. The studio fostered many series: The Dead End Kids and Little Tough Guys action features and serials (1938–43); the comic adventures of infant Baby Sandy (1938–41); comedies with Hugh Herbert (1938–42) and The Ritz Brothers (1940–43); musicals with Robert Paige, Jane Frazee, The Andrews Sisters, and The Merry Macs (1938–45); and westerns with Tom Mix (1932–33), Buck Jones (1933–36), Bob Baker (1938–39), Johnny Mack Brown (1938–43); Rod Cameron (1944–45), and Kirby Grant (1946–47).

Universal could seldom afford its own stable of stars and often borrowed talent from other studios or hired freelance actors. In addition to Stewart and Dietrich, Margaret Sullavan and Bing Crosby were two of the major names that made a couple of pictures for Universal during this period. Some stars came from radio, including Edgar Bergen, W. C. Fields, and the comedy team of Abbott and Costello (Bud Abbott and Lou Costello). Abbott and Costello's military comedy Buck Privates (1941) gave the former burlesque comedians a national and international profile.

During the war years, Universal did have a co-production arrangement with producer Walter Wanger and his partner, director Fritz Lang, lending the studio some amount of prestige productions. Universal's core audience base was still found in the neighborhood movie theaters, and the studio continued to please the public with low- to medium-budget films. Basil Rathbone and Nigel Bruce in new Sherlock Holmes mysteries (1942–46), teenage musicals with Gloria Jean, Donald O'Connor, and Peggy Ryan (1942–43), and screen adaptations of radio's Inner Sanctum Mystery with Lon Chaney Jr. (1943–45). Alfred Hitchcock was also borrowed for two films from Selznick International Pictures: Saboteur (1942) and Shadow of a Doubt (1943).

As Universal's main product had always been lower-budgeted films, it was one of the last major studios to contract with Technicolor. The studio did not make use of the three-strip Technicolor process until Arabian Nights (1942), starring Jon Hall and Maria Montez. Technicolor was also used for the studio's remake of their 1925 horror melodrama, Phantom of the Opera (1943) with Claude Rains and Nelson Eddy. With the success of their first two pictures, a regular schedule of high-budget Technicolor films followed.

=== Universal-International and Decca Records ===
In 1945, J. Arthur Rank, who had already owned a stake in the studio almost a decade before, hoping to expand his American presence, bought into a four-way merger with Universal, the independent company International Pictures, and producer Kenneth Young. The new combine, United World Pictures, was a failure and was dissolved within one year. However, Rank and International remained interested in Universal, culminating in the studio's reorganization as Universal-International; the merger was announced on July 30, 1946. William Goetz, a founder of International along with Leo Spitz, was made head of production at the renamed Universal-International Pictures, a subsidiary of Universal Pictures Company, Inc. which also served as an import-export subsidiary, and copyright holder for the production arm's films. Goetz, a son-in-law of Louis B. Mayer, decided to bring "prestige" to the new company. He stopped the studio's low-budget production of B movies, serials and curtailed Universal's horror and "Arabian Nights" cycles. He also reduced the studio's output from its wartime average of fifty films per year (nearly twice the major studio's output) to thirty-five films a year. Distribution and copyright control remained under the name of Universal Pictures Company Inc.

Universal International Studio, 1955

Goetz set out an ambitious schedule. Universal-International became responsible for the American distribution of Rank's British productions, including such classics as David Lean's Great Expectations (1946) and Laurence Olivier's Hamlet (1948). Broadening its scope further, Universal-International branched out into the lucrative non-theatrical field, buying a majority stake in home-movie dealer Castle Films in 1947 and taking the company over entirely in 1951. For three decades, Castle would offer "highlights" reels from the Universal film library to home-movie enthusiasts and collectors. Goetz licensed Universal's pre–Universal-International film library to Jack Broeder's Realart Pictures for cinema re-release, but Realart was not allowed to show the films on television.

The production arm of the studio still struggled. While there were to be a few hits like The Killers (1946) and The Naked City (1948), both produced by Mark Hellinger, Universal-International's new theatrical films often met with disappointing response at the box office. By the late 1940s, Goetz was out. The studio returned to low-budget and series films such as Ma and Pa Kettle (1949), a spin-off of the studio's 1947 hit The Egg and I and the inexpensive Francis (1950), the first film of a series about a talking mule, became mainstays of the company. Once again, the films of Abbott and Costello, including Abbott and Costello Meet Frankenstein (1948), were among the studio's top-grossing productions. But at this point, Rank lost interest and sold his shares to the investor Milton Rackmil, whose Decca Records would take full control of Universal in 1952. Besides Abbott and Costello, the studio retained the Walter Lantz cartoon studio, whose product was released with Universal-International's films.

In the 1950s, Universal-International resumed their series of Arabian Nights films, many starring Tony Curtis. The studio also had success with monster and science fiction films produced by William Alland, with many directed by Jack Arnold and starring John Agar. Other successes were the melodramas directed by Douglas Sirk and produced by Ross Hunter, which were critically reassessed more positively years later. Among Universal-International's stable of stars were Rock Hudson, Tony Curtis, Jeff Chandler, Audie Murphy, and John Gavin.

Although Decca would continue to keep picture budgets lean, it was favored by changing circumstances in the film business, as other studios let their contract actors go in the wake of the 1948 U.S. vs. Paramount Pictures, et al. decision. Leading actors were increasingly free to work where and when they chose, and in 1950 MCA agent Lew Wasserman made a deal with Universal for his client James Stewart that would change the rules of the business. Wasserman's deal gave Stewart a share in the profits of three pictures in lieu of a large salary. When one of those films, Winchester '73 (1950), proved to be a hit, the arrangement would become the rule for many future productions at Universal and eventually at other studios as well.

=== MCA takes over ===
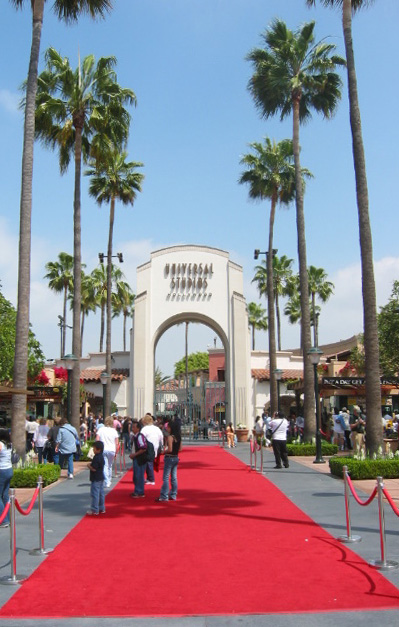
Ceremonial gate to Universal Studios Hollywood (the theme park attached to the studio lot)

In the early 1950s, Universal set up its own distribution company in France. In the late 1960s, the company also started a production company in Paris, Universal Productions France S.A., although sometimes credited by the name of the distribution company, Universal Pictures France. Except for the two first films it produced, Claude Chabrol's Le scandale (English title The Champagne Murders, 1967) and Romain Gary's Les oiseaux vont mourir au Pérou (English title Birds in Peru), it was only involved in French or other European co-productions, including Louis Malle's Lacombe, Lucien, Bertrand Blier's Les Valseuses (English title Going Places, 1974), and Fred Zinnemann's The Day of the Jackal (1973). It was only involved in approximately 20 French film productions. In the early 1970s, the unit was incorporated into the French Cinema International Corporation arm.

In 1954, the studio loaned out television syndication rights to the black-and-white cartoons produced by Walter Lantz Productions to Motion Pictures for Television (later absorbed into Guild Films). In 1957, Universal-International secured a deal with Screen Gems, a television subsidiary of Columbia Pictures Corporation to license 600 of its pre-1948 sound films for $20 million.

By the late 1950s, the motion picture business was again changing. The combination of the studio/theater-chain breakup and the rise of television saw the reduced audience size for cinema productions. The Music Corporation of America (MCA), the world's largest talent agency, had also become a powerful television producer, renting space at Republic Studios for its Revue Productions subsidiary. After a period of complete shutdown, a moribund Universal agreed to sell its 360-acre (1.5 km^{2}) studio lot to MCA in 1958 for $11 million, renamed Revue Studios. MCA owned the studio lot, but not Universal Pictures, yet was increasingly influential on Universal's products. The studio lot was upgraded and modernized, while MCA clients like Doris Day, Lana Turner, Cary Grant, and director Alfred Hitchcock were signed to Universal contracts.

The long-awaited takeover of Universal Pictures by MCA, Inc. happened in mid-1962 as part of the MCA-Decca Records merger. As a final gesture before leaving the talent agency business, virtually every MCA client was signed to a Universal contract. In 1963, MCA formed Universal City Studios, Inc., merging the motion pictures and television arms of the formerly Universal Pictures Company and Revue Studios (which was officially renamed as Universal Television). And so, with MCA in charge, Universal became a full-blown, A-film movie studio, with leading actors and directors under contract; offering slick, commercial films; and a studio tour subsidiary launched in 1964.

Television production made up much of the studio's output, with Universal heavily committed, in particular, to deals with NBC (which much later merged with Universal to form NBC Universal; see below) providing up to half of all prime time shows for several seasons. An innovation during this period championed by Universal was the made-for-television movie. In 1982, Universal became the studio base for many shows that were produced by Norman Lear's Tandem Productions/Embassy Television, including Diff'rent Strokes, One Day at a Time, The Jeffersons, The Facts of Life, and Silver Spoons which premiered on NBC that same fall.

At this time, Hal B. Wallis, who had recently worked as a major producer at Paramount, moved over to Universal, where he produced several films, among them a lavish version of Maxwell Anderson's Anne of the Thousand Days (1969) and the equally lavish Mary, Queen of Scots (1971). Although neither could claim to be a big financial hit, both films received Academy Award nominations, and Anne was nominated for Best Picture, Best Actor (Richard Burton), Best Actress (Geneviève Bujold), and Best Supporting Actor (Anthony Quayle). Wallis retired from Universal after making the film Rooster Cogburn (1975), a sequel to True Grit (1969), which Wallis had produced at Paramount. Rooster Cogburn co-starred John Wayne, reprising his Oscar-winning role from the earlier film, and Katharine Hepburn, their only film together. The film was only a moderate success.

In 1982, Universal Pictures launched an independent film arm designed to release specialty films, Universal Classics, which in 1983, the division has sights on separation. In May 1984, the classics division was renamed Universal Special Projects, before shuttered in 1985. The company next made its another attempt at an arthouse film unit by having MCA a minority stake in the Cineplex Odeon chain, which included Cineplex Odeon Films, which started distributing in 1986 in the U.S. after a Canadian run, but stopped distributing in the U.S. in 1989 after a string of flops.

In 1987, Universal Pictures, MGM/UA Communications Co., and Paramount Pictures teamed up to market feature film and television products to China. Consumer reach was measured in terms of the 25 billion admission tickets that were clocked in China in 1986, and Worldwide Media Sales, a division of the New York-based Worldwide Media Group, had been placed in charge of the undertaking.

In the early 1980s, the company had its own pay television arm Universal Pay Television (a.k.a. Universal Pay TV Programming, Inc.), which spawned in 1987, an 11-picture cable television agreement with then-independent film studio New Line Cinema.

In the early 1970s, Universal teamed up with Paramount to form Cinema International Corporation, which distributed films by Paramount and Universal outside of the US and Canada. Although Universal did produce occasional hits, among them Airport (1970), The Sting (1973), American Graffiti (also 1973), Earthquake (1974), and a big box-office success which restored the company's fortunes: Jaws (1975), Universal during the decade was primarily a television studio. When Metro-Goldwyn-Mayer purchased United Artists in 1981, MGM could not drop out of the CIC venture to merge with United Artists overseas operations. However, with future film productions from both names being released through the MGM/UA Entertainment plate, CIC decided to merge UA's international units with MGM and reformed as United International Pictures. There would be other film hits like Smokey and the Bandit (1977), Animal House (1978), The Muppet Movie (1979), (Note: The film rights to The Muppet Movie were purchased by The Jim Henson Company from ITC Entertainment in August 1984. The film rights were then acquired by Walt Disney Studios upon their parent company's acquisition of the Muppets franchise in 2004; the film has since been reissued under the Walt Disney Pictures banner for home media releases. Since 1981, Universal retains the rights for theatrical distribution in the United States, due to prior contractual obligations with the former Associated Film Distribution and ITC, but the film's ownership and copyright are controlled by Disney.) The Jerk (also 1979), The Blues Brothers (1980), The Four Seasons (1981), On Golden Pond (also 1981), E.T. the Extra-Terrestrial (1982), The Breakfast Club (1985), Back to the Future (also 1985), An American Tail (1986), The Land Before Time (1988), Field of Dreams (1989), Jurassic Park (1993) and Casper (1995), but the film business was financially unpredictable with some films like The Thing (1982), Scarface (1983), Dune (1984), Howard the Duck (1986), The Last Temptation of Christ (1988) or Waterworld (1995), which turned out to be big box office disappointments despite their high budget; however, these films became cult films in later years. UIP began distributing films by start-up studio DreamWorks in 1997 due to the founders' connections with Paramount, Universal, and Amblin Entertainment. In 2001, MGM dropped out of the UIP venture and went with 20th Century Fox's international arm to handle the distribution of their titles, an ongoing arrangement. UIP nearly lost its connection with Universal Pictures in 1999 when Universal started Universal Pictures International to take over the assets of PolyGram Filmed Entertainment and wanted UPI to distribute their films starting in 2001. Only a small handful of films were released theatrically by Universal Pictures International, up until the release of the film Mickey Blue Eyes. UIP then took over the theatrical distribution inventory of future films planned to be released by Universal Pictures International, such as The Green Mile and Angela's Ashes. On October 4, 1999, Universal renewed its commitments to United International Pictures to release its films internationally through 2006.

=== Matsushita and Seagram ===
Anxious to expand the company's broadcast and cable presence, longtime MCA head Lew Wasserman sought a rich partner. He located Japanese electronics manufacturer Matsushita Electric (now known as Panasonic), which agreed to acquire MCA for $6.6 billion in 1990.

In 1992, three years after the U.S. branch of Cineplex Odeon Films folded, Universal teamed up with PolyGram Filmed Entertainment to launch Gramercy Pictures for release of arthouse films. Universal first sold its stake in Gramercy Pictures in 1996, then acquired October Films in 1997.

On December 9, 1996, the new owners dropped the MCA name; the company became Universal Studios Inc. and MCA's music division, MCA Music Entertainment Group, was renamed Universal Music Group. MCA Records continued to live on as a label within the Universal Music Group. The following year, G. P. Putnam's Sons was sold to the Penguin Group subsidiary of Pearson PLC.

Matsushita provided a cash infusion, but the clash of cultures was too great to overcome, and five years later, Matsushita sold an 80% stake in MCA/Universal to Canadian drinks distributor Seagram for $5.7 billion. Seagram sold off its stake in DuPont to fund this expansion into the entertainment industry. Hoping to build an entertainment empire around Universal, Seagram bought PolyGram from Philips in 1999 and other entertainment properties, but the fluctuating profits characteristic of Hollywood were no substitute for the reliable income stream gained from the previously held shares in DuPont.

=== NBCUniversal/Comcast era ===
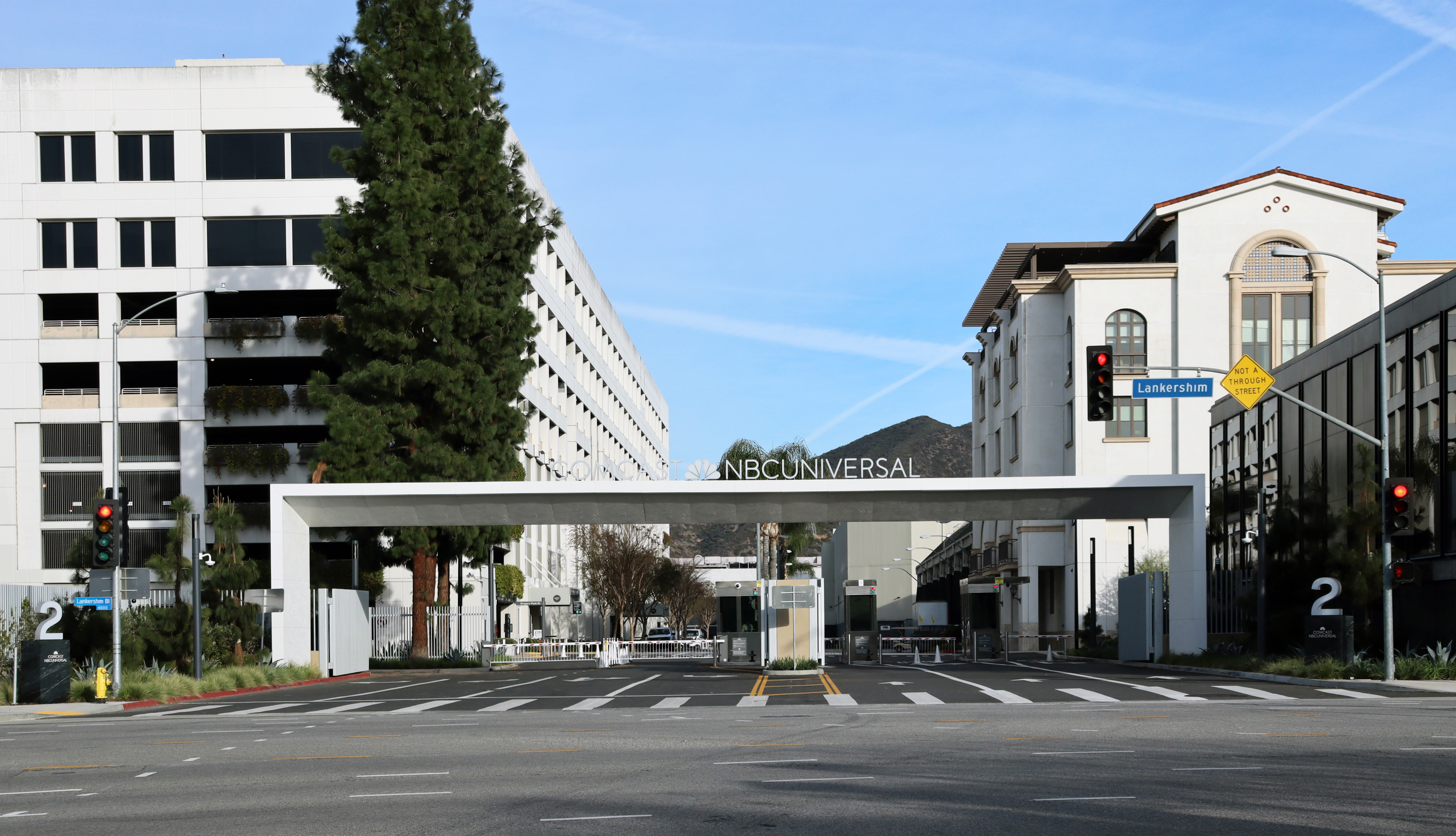
Gate 2, Universal Studios

In 1999, after selling October Films, Universal launched its new arthouse label, a second iteration of Universal Classics, which was soon renamed Universal Focus in 2000. Afterward, Universal Pictures acquired the United States distribution rights of several of StudioCanal's films, such as David Lynch's Mulholland Drive (2001) and Brotherhood of the Wolf (2001) which became the sixth-highest-grossing French-language film of all time in the United States. Universal Pictures and StudioCanal also co-produced several films, such as Love Actually (2003); a $40 million-budgeted film that eventually grossed $246 million worldwide. In late 2000, the New York Film Academy was permitted to use the Universal Studios backlot for student film projects in an unofficial partnership.

In late 2005, Viacom's Paramount Pictures acquired DreamWorks SKG after acquisition talks between GE and DreamWorks stalled. Universal's long-time chairperson, Stacey Snider, left the company in early 2006 to head up DreamWorks. Snider was replaced by then-Vice chairman Marc Shmuger and Focus Features head David Linde. On October 5, 2009, Marc Shmuger and David Linde were ousted, and their co-chairperson jobs were consolidated under former president of worldwide marketing and distribution Adam Fogelson, becoming the single chairperson. Donna Langley was also upped to co-chairperson. In 2009, Stephanie Sperber founded Universal Partnerships & Licensing within Universal to license consumer products for Universal.

In September 2013, Adam Fogelson was ousted as co-chairman of Universal Pictures, promoting Donna Langley to the sole chairperson. In addition, NBCUniversal International chairman Jeff Shell would be appointed as chairman of the newly created Universal Filmed Entertainment Group. Longtime studio head Ron Meyer would give up oversight of the film studio and appointed vice chairman of NBCUniversal, providing consultation to CEO Steve Burke on all of the company's operations. Meyer retained oversight of Universal Parks and Resorts.

Universal's multi-year film financing deal with Elliott Management expired in 2013. In summer 2013, Universal made an agreement with Thomas Tull's Legendary Pictures to distribute their films for five years starting in 2014 (the year that Legendary's similar agreement with Warner Bros. Pictures ended).

In June 2014, Universal Partnerships took over licensing consumer products for NBC and Sprout with the expectation that all licensing would eventually be centralized within NBCUniversal.

In May 2015, Gramercy Pictures was revived by Focus Features as a genre label concentrating on action, sci-fi, and horror films.

On December 16, 2015, Amblin Partners announced that it entered into a five-year distribution deal with Universal Pictures by which the films would be distributed and marketed by either Universal or Focus Features.

In early 2016, Perfect World Pictures announced a long-term co-financing deal with Universal, representing the first time a Chinese company directly invests in a multi-year slate deal with a major U.S. studio.

On April 28, 2016, Universal's parent company, NBCUniversal, announced a $3.8 billion deal to buy DreamWorks Animation. On August 22, 2016, the deal was completed. Universal took over the distribution deal with DreamWorks Animation starting in 2019 with the release of How to Train Your Dragon: The Hidden World, after DreamWorks Animation's distribution deal with 20th Century Fox ended, following the release of Captain Underpants: The First Epic Movie in 2017.

On February 15, 2017, Universal Pictures acquired a minority stake in Amblin Partners, strengthening the relationship between Universal and Amblin, and reuniting a minority percentage of the live-action DreamWorks label with its former animation division.

In December 2019, Universal Pictures entered early negotiations to distribute upcoming feature films based on the Lego toys. Although the original The Lego Movie characters and projects are still owned by Warner Bros. Pictures, Universal Pictures would serve as a distributor of future releases and would develop additional Lego films. The first Lego film under Universal Pictures' run of their film rights is Piece by Piece (2024).

On April 28, 2020, following the release of Trolls World Tour on premium video on demand due to the COVID-19 pandemic, AMC Theaters announced they would not carry films from Universal after NBCUniversal CEO Jeff Shell commented in The Wall Street Journal that the studio wanted to release films via premium video-on-demand simultaneously with theatrical releases. The company threatened that this would also be done with any other studio "who unilaterally abandons current windowing practices absent good faith negotiations between us, so that they as distributor and we as exhibitor both benefit and neither are hurt from such changes." On June 3, 2020, AMC stated that it had "substantial doubt" that it would remain in business. On July 28, 2020, AMC and Universal were able to resolve their dispute, with AMC agreeing to a shorter theatrical window of 17 days (or 31 days for films that opened to $50 million or higher in their opening weekend) before Universal could release their films via premium VOD, as well as revenue sharing on the premium VOD window. This policy (which was later adopted by other theater chains) remained in place until March 12, 2026, when Universal announced that they would be extending the minimum theatrical window for all releases under the Universal label to 31 days before hitting premium VOD that year, with plans to extend the window further to 45 days in 2027 (with releases under Focus Features continuing to abide by the 17-day window with some exceptions), bringing Universal in line with most other major studios that have adopted similar windows post-pandemic.

In June 2020, it was announced longtime Universal International Distribution President Duncan Clark would be stepping down. He would transition to a consulting role with the studio in August and would be replaced by Veronika Kwan Vandenberg.

In 2021, Universal signed an 18-month deal with Netflix and Amazon Prime Video for their animated and live-action films, respectively, where the films would first stream on Peacock for the first four months of the pay-TV window, before moving to Netflix and Prime Video, respectively, for the next ten, and then returning to Peacock for the final four. In October 2024, Universal and Netflix renewed the licensing deal for the animated films, also adding live-action films starting in 2027.

== Units ==
- Universal Pictures International
  - Universal International Distribution
- Universal Pictures Home Entertainment
  - Universal Home Entertainment Productions
  - Universal 1440 Entertainment
  - DreamWorks Animation Home Entertainment
  - Universal Sony Pictures Home Entertainment Australia (joint venture with Sony Pictures Home Entertainment)
  - Universal Playback
  - Studio Distribution Services (joint venture with Warner Bros. Discovery Home Entertainment)
- Focus Features
- Universal Pictures International Entertainment
  - NBCUniversal Entertainment Japan
- Working Title Films
  - WT^{2} Productions
  - Working Title Television
- Rede Telecine (former; 12.5%, joint venture with Canais Globo, Walt Disney Studios, Paramount Pictures and Metro-Goldwyn-Mayer)
- Illumination
  - Illumination Studios Paris
  - Illumination Labs
  - Moonlight
- DreamWorks Animation
  - DreamWorks Animation Television
  - DreamWorks Classics
    - Big Idea Entertainment (in-name-only unit of DreamWorks Animation)
    - Bullwinkle Studios (JV)
    - Harvey Entertainment (in-name-only unit of DreamWorks Animation)
  - DreamWorks Theatricals
  - DreamWorks New Media
    - DreamWorksTV
  - DreamWorks Press
- Back Lot Music
- Universal Products & Experiences
- United International Pictures (50%, joint venture with Paramount Global's Paramount Pictures)
- Amblin Partners (minority stake) (JV)
  - Amblin Entertainment
  - Amblin Television
  - DreamWorks Pictures
  - Storyteller Distribution
- Blumhouse Holdings, LLC (minority stake with Jason Blum and James Wan)
  - Blumhouse Productions
    - Atomic Monster
    - BH Tilt (with Neon)
    - BlumHansonAllen Films
    - Blumhouse Books
    - Blumhouse Games
    - Blumhouse International
    - Blumhouse Television (55%)
    - Haunted Movies

== Filmography ==
=== Highest-grossing films ===
Universal was the first studio to have released three billion-dollar films in one year; this distinction was achieved in 2015 with Furious 7, Jurassic World, and Minions. The Odyssey is the studio's highest-grossing film.

Highest-grossing films in North America
Rank	Title	Year	Gross
1	Jurassic World	2015	$653,406,625
2	The Odyssey	2026	$625,595,435
3	The Super Mario Bros. Movie	2023	$574,934,330
4	Wicked	2024	$474,983,975
5	E.T. the Extra-Terrestrial ^{‡}	1982	$439,251,124
6	The Super Mario Galaxy Movie	2026	$429,814,610
7	Jurassic World: Fallen Kingdom	2018	$417,719,760
8	Jurassic Park ^{‡}	1993	$415,248,873
9	Jurassic World Dominion	2022	$376,851,080
10	Michael	2026	$372,303,388
11	Minions: The Rise of Gru	2022	$369,695,210
12	The Secret Life of Pets	2016	$368,384,330
13	Despicable Me 2	2013	$368,061,265
14	Despicable Me 4	2024	$361,004,205
15	Furious 7	2015	$353,007,020
16	Wicked: For Good	2025	$342,915,090
17	Jurassic World Rebirth	2025	$339,640,400
18	Minions	2015	$336,045,770
19	Oppenheimer	2023	$330,078,895
20	Jaws	1975	$280,083,300
21	Meet the Fockers	2004	$279,261,160
22	The Grinch	2018	$270,620,950
23	Sing	2016	$270,329,045
24	Twisters	2024	$267,762,265
25	Dr. Seuss' How the Grinch Stole Christmas	2000	$265,489,295

Highest-grossing films worldwide
Rank	Title	Year	Gross
1	The Odyssey	2026	$1,801,725,335
2	Jurassic World	2015	$1,671,537,444
3	Furious 7	2015	$1,516,045,911
4	The Super Mario Bros. Movie	2023	$1,361,767,338
5	Jurassic World: Fallen Kingdom	2018	$1,308,473,425
6	The Fate of the Furious	2017	$1,238,764,765
7	Minions	2015	$1,159,398,397
8	Jurassic Park ^{‡}	1993	$1,037,535,230
9	Despicable Me 3	2017	$1,034,800,131
10	Michael	2026	$1,021,426,595
11	The Super Mario Galaxy Movie	2026	$1,011,921,543
12	Jurassic World Dominion	2022	$1,001,978,080
13	Oppenheimer	2023	$976,120,348
14	Despicable Me 2	2013	$970,761,885
15	Despicable Me 4	2024	$969,593,874
16	Minions: The Rise of Gru	2022	$939,628,210
17	The Secret Life of Pets	2016	$875,457,937
18	Jurassic World Rebirth	2025	$869,146,189
19	E.T. the Extra-Terrestrial ^{‡}	1982	$797,103,542
20	Fast & Furious 6	2013	$788,679,850
21	No Time to Die	2021	$774,153,007
22	Fast & Furious Presents: Hobbs & Shaw	2019	$760,732,926
23	Wicked	2024	$758,737,211
24	F9	2021	$726,229,501
25	Fast X	2023	$704,875,015

^{‡} Includes theatrical reissue(s).

== Former logos ==
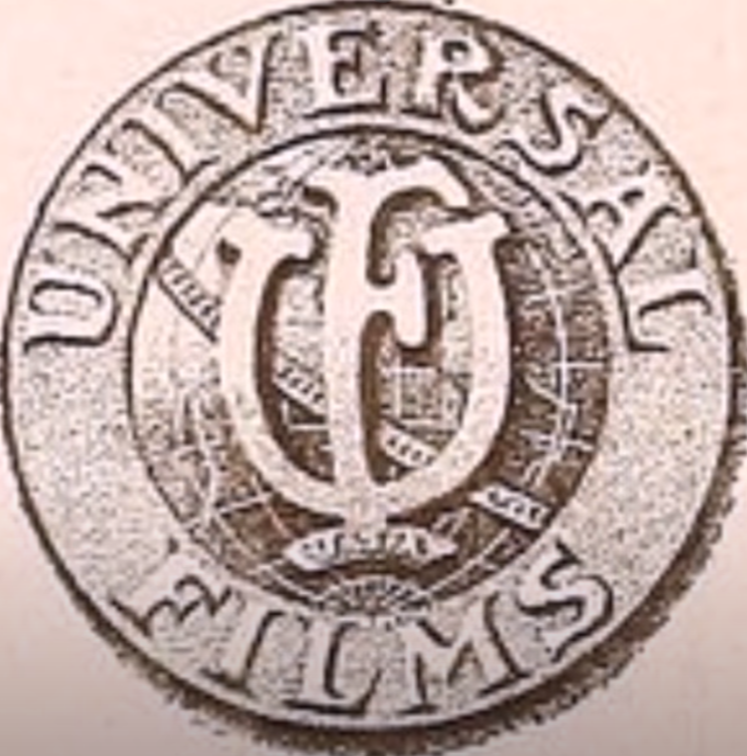
Universal Film Manufacturing Company print logo, 1912

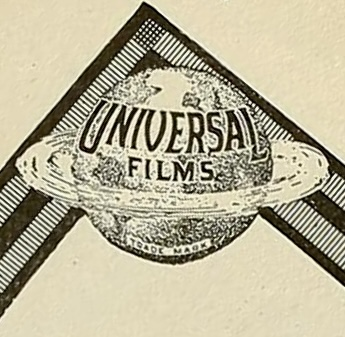
Logo used from 1913 to 1914

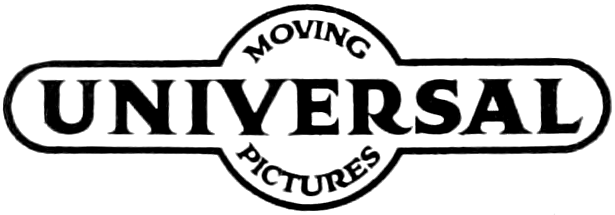
Logo used from 1914 to 1919

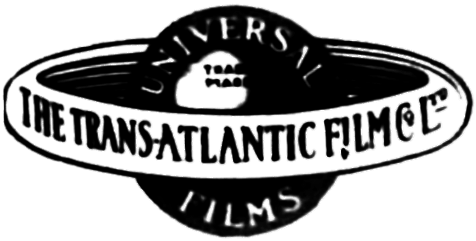
Logo used from 1919 to 1923

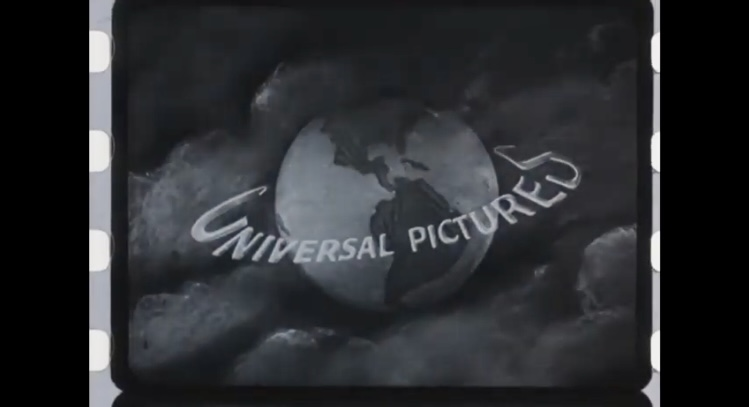
Logo used from 1915 to 1927

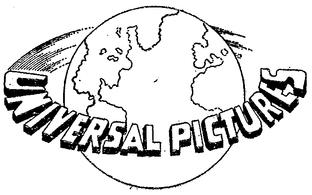
Logo used from 1922 to 1931

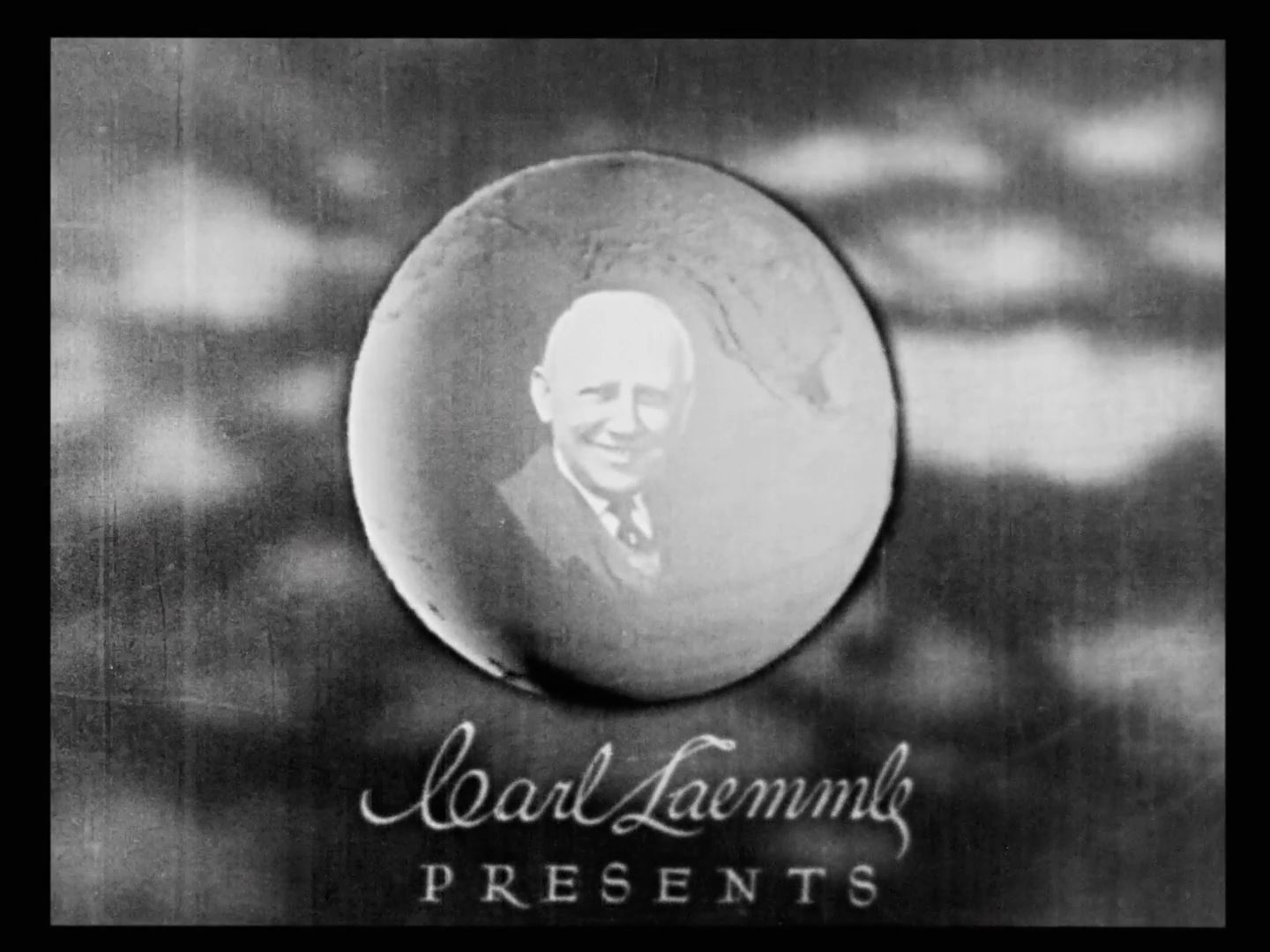
Logo used from 1925 to 1927

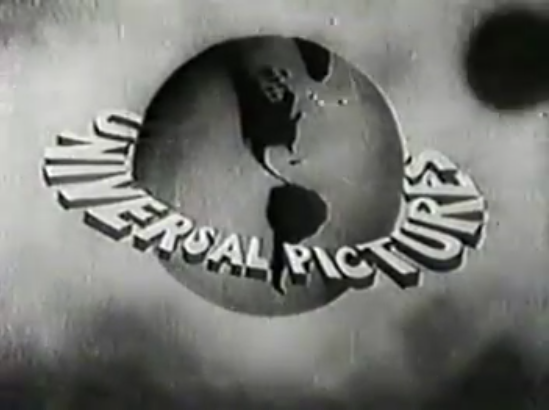
Logo version used in cartoons from 1927

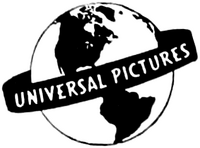
Logo used from 1936 to 1947

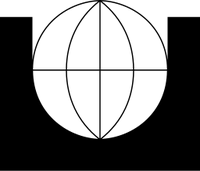
Logo used from 1963 to 1990

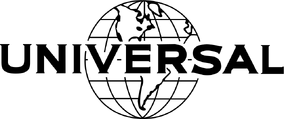
Logo used from 1990 to 1997

Logo used from 1996 to 2012. The logo is still used on some properties, such as the independent company Universal Music Group.
