= New York Motion Picture Company =

United States production company

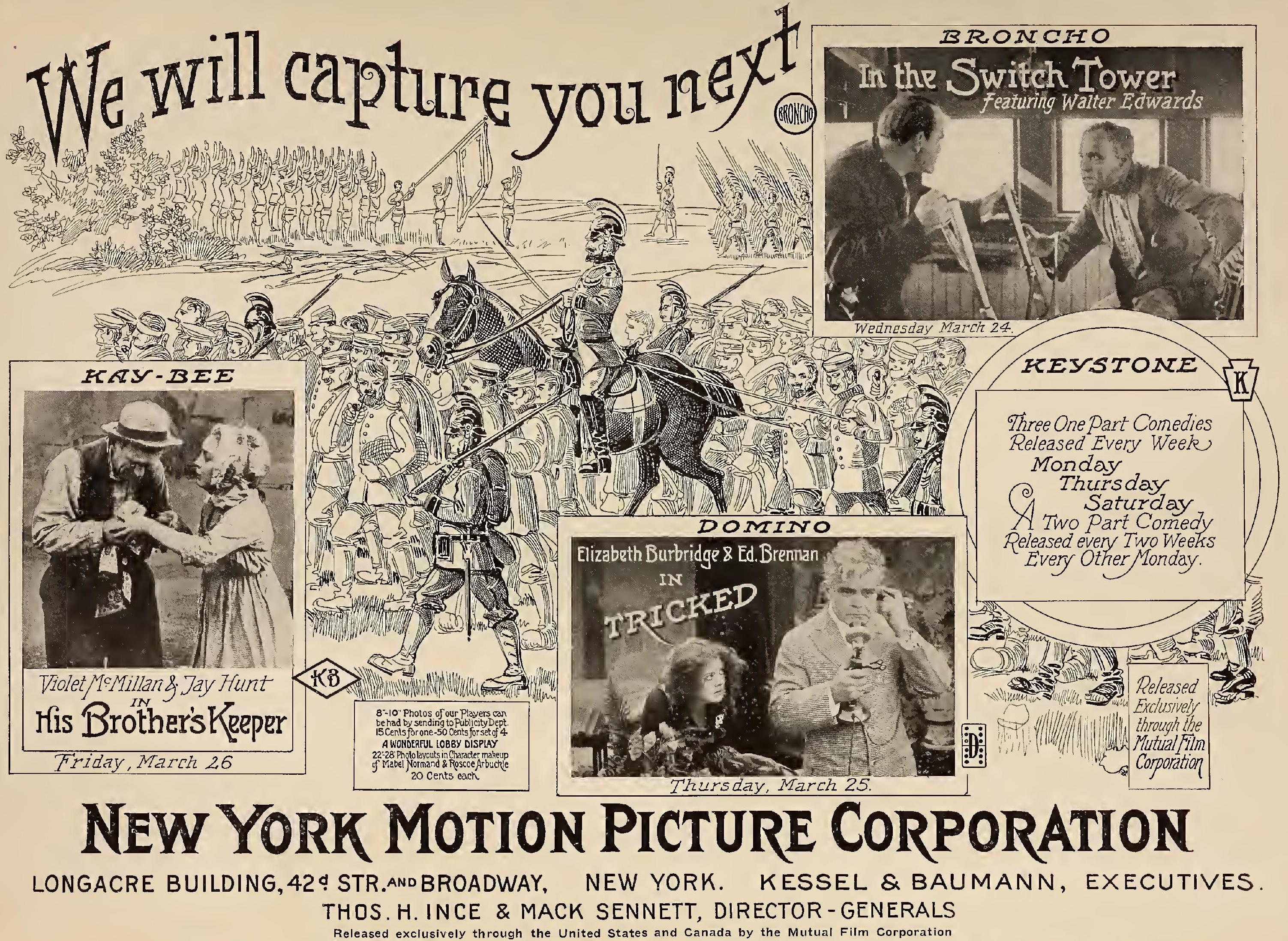

The New York Motion Picture Company was a film production and distribution company from 1909 until 1914. It changed names to New York Picture Corporation in 1912. It released films through several different brand names, including 101 Bison, Kay-Bee, Broncho, Domino, Reliance, and Keystone Studios.

Keystone would later be a part of Triangle Pictures, which would merge with Jesse L. Lasky's Jesse L. Lasky Feature Play Company and become Paramount Studios.

== History ==
The New York Motion Picture Company was founded in 1909 by Adam Kessel, Charles O. Baumann, and camera operator Frank Balshofer. Originally interested purely in film distribution, the company's refusal to work with Thomas Edison's Motion Picture Patents Company (MPPC) created difficulties in securing films. Kessel was quoted as saying, "We would have to go out of business unless we made some films ourselves."

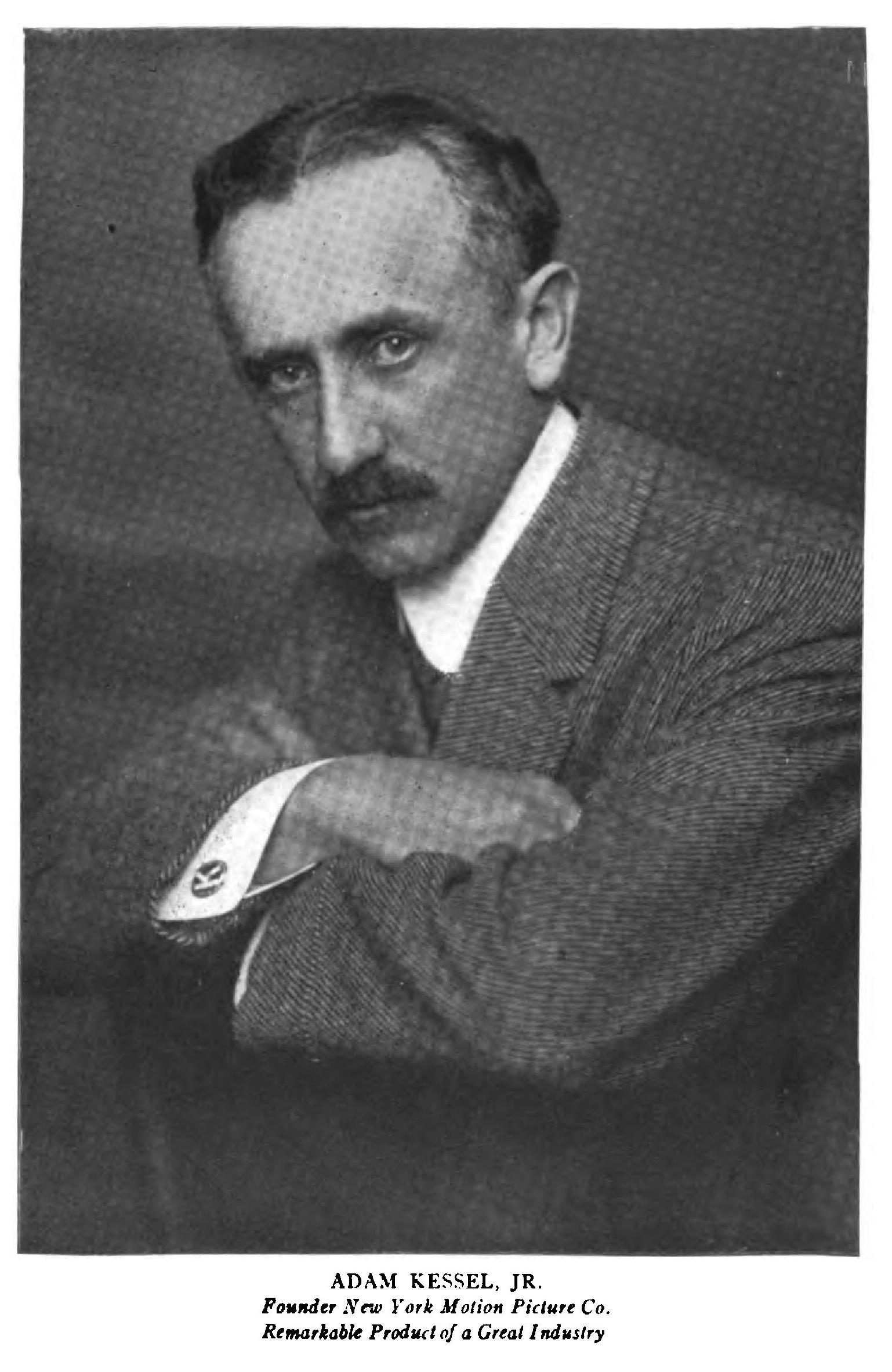
Adam Kessel

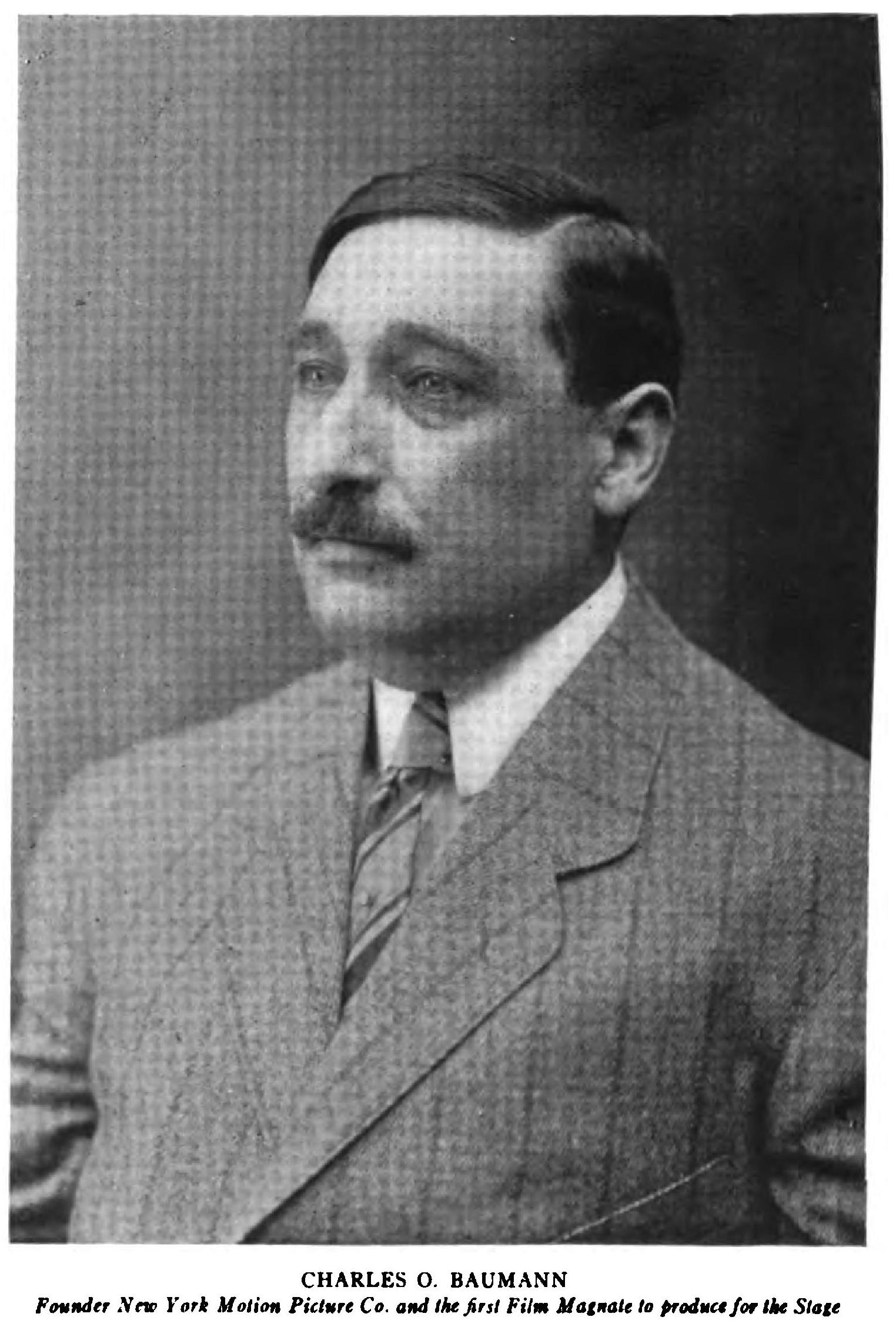
Charles O Baumann

Their first film, Disinherited Son's Loyalty, was made in May 1909. It cost around $200 to make, and earned $2,000. From that point on, NYMPC produced about half the films it played.

Billy Gane served as general manager.

The company later merged with the Universal Film Manufacturing Company, only to later pull out of the merger in favor of their rival, the Mutual Film Corp., when Universal attempted to remove Baumann as company president. Due to the complicated legal situation, Universal continued to release films under the 101 Bison brand name at the same time as Mutual, which prompted NYMPC to release flyers urging viewers to make sure they were viewing a "genuine Bison" It was during their time with Mutual that Kessel and Baumann formed the Keystone Studios brand with director and actor Mack Sennett. At this point, the company had changed location from the North East to California, being one of the first to do so.

It was during a one-year apprenticeship at Keystone that Charlie Chaplin made some of his earliest films. It was during Chaplin's time at Keystone that he created the 'Little Tramp' character he became known for.

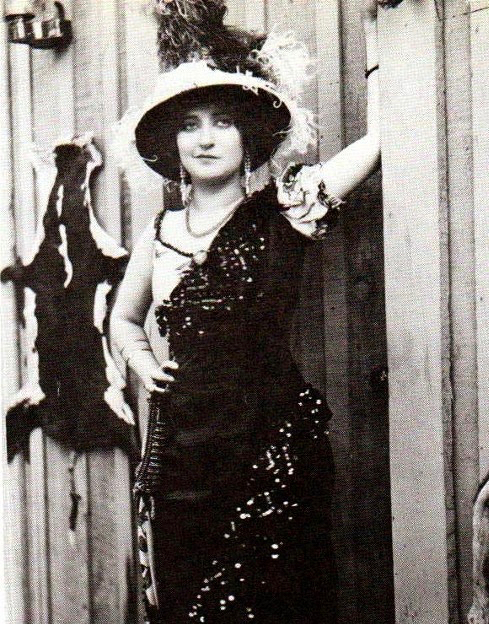
Rhea Mitchell in a publicity photo for On the Night Stage

In 1915, Keystone Studios became an integral part of the Triangle Film Corporation, after the decision was made to end the merger with Mutual Film Corp. Triangle Film sought to combine the talents of producers D.W. Griffith, Thomas Ince and Mack Sennett. Essentially, it was a combining of assets between Kessel, Baumann, and former Mutual Film Corp. president Harry Aitken as well as Jesse Lasky's Feature Play company. Their mission statement was to make multi-reel films, à la The Birth of a Nation, that would appeal to higher class audiences while also gaining popularity among the general population.

Triangle Film was largely considered a failure, however, Feature Play would go on to merge with Famous Players and become Paramount Pictures, a company that was far more successful in achieving the kind of vertical integration Triangle sought in its business model.

== Filmography ==
- Disinherited Son's Loyalty (1909)

=== 1910s ===
- Wrath of the Gods (1914)
- The Colonel's Ward (1914)
- On the Night Stage (1915)

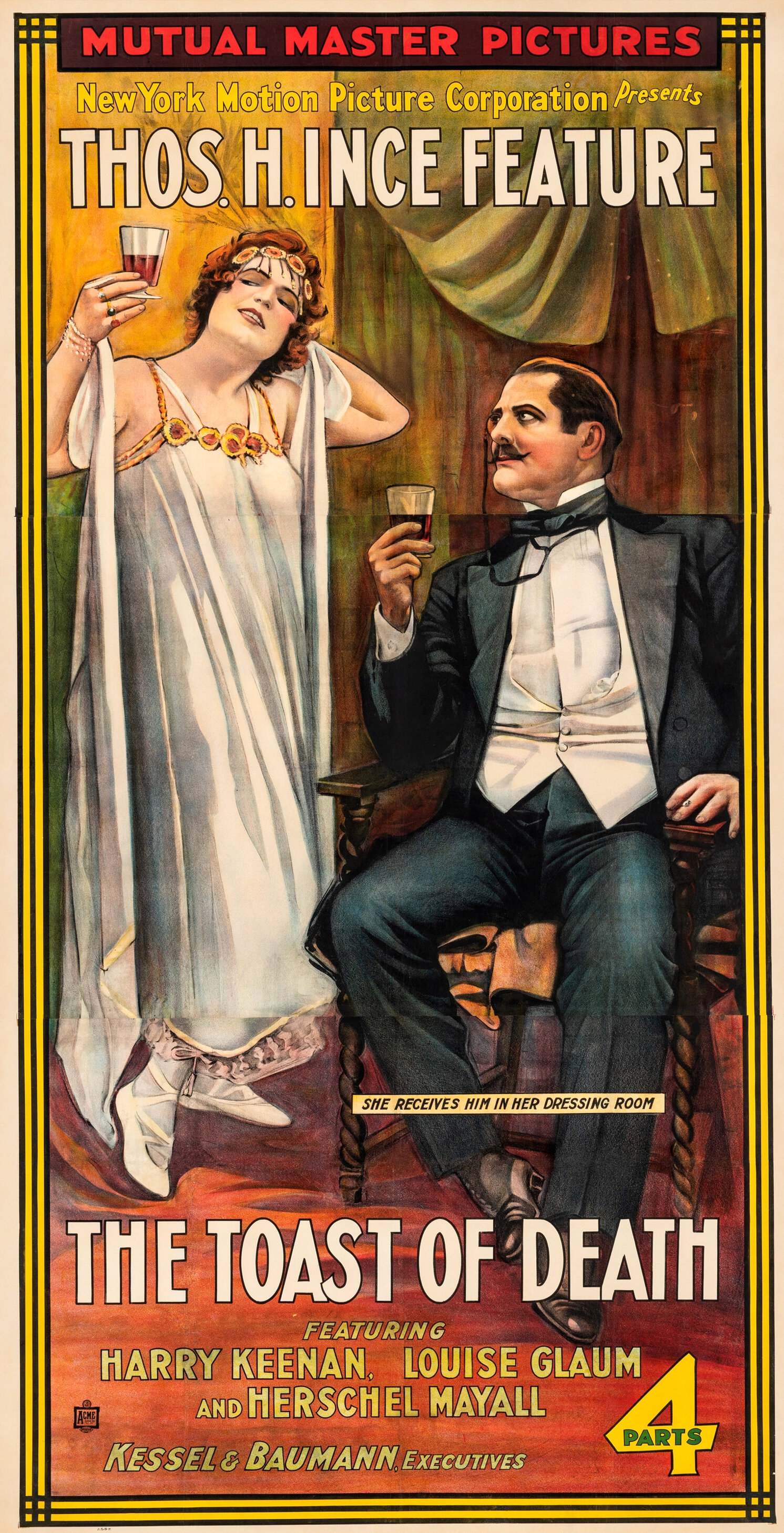
The Toast of Death poster

Release date	Title
October 1914	The Typhoon
August 1915	The Toast of Death
November 1915	The Coward
December 1915	The Winged Idol
February 1916	The Three Musketeers
April 1916	The Stepping Stone
August 1917	The Soul Herder
