= The Rose Bush of Memories =

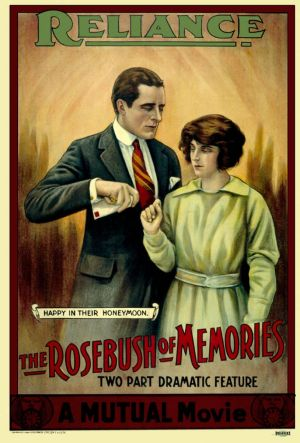
- Theatrical poster to The Rose Bush of Memories
- Directed by: Edward Morrissey
- Distributed by: Reliance Film Company
- Release date: 1914
- Country: United States

The Rose Bush of Memories is a 1914 American silent short film. The film starred Earle Foxe, Miriam Cooper, Courtenay Foote, and Charles Courtwright.
