= The Toast of Death =

1915 film by Thomas H. Ince

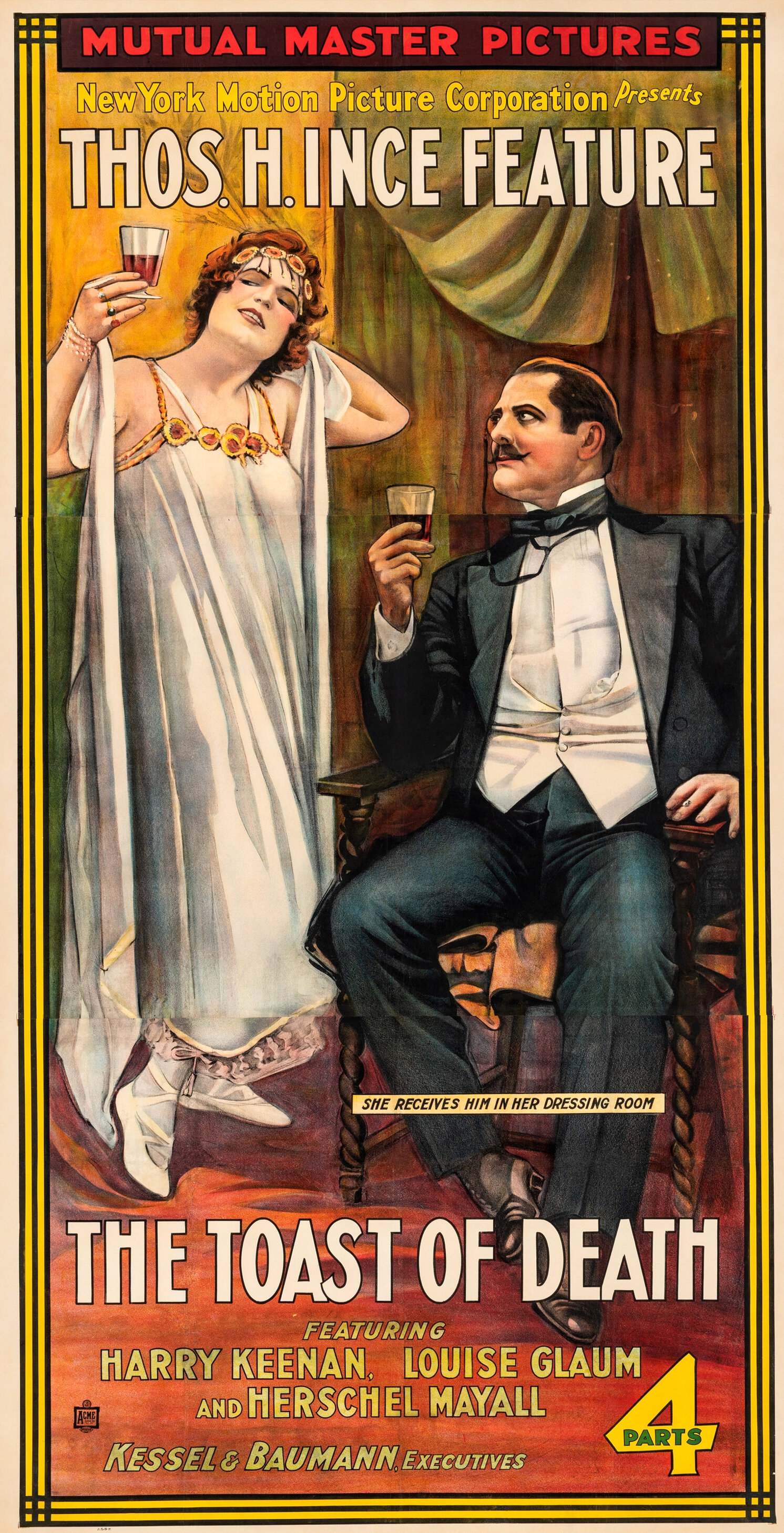
- Poster
- Directed by: Thomas H. Ince
- Written by: C. Gardner Sullivan
- Starring: Louise Glaum; Harry Keenan; Herschel Mayall
- Production companies: New York Motion Picture Company; Inceville
- Distributed by: Mutual Film
- Release date: August 12, 1915
- Running time: 50 min. (5-reels)
- Country: United States
- Language: Silent with English intertitles

The Toast of Death is a 1915 silent era drama/romance motion picture released by Mutual Film Corporation starring Louise Glaum, Harry Keenan, and Herschel Mayall.

Directed by Thomas H. Ince and produced by the New York Motion Picture Company, the screenplay was written by C. Gardner Sullivan.

Although contemporary sources list Thomas Ince as the director, modern sources give directorial credit to Scott Sidney.

One of the early five-reel feature length silent movies, The Toast of Death was filmed at Inceville Studio in Topanga Canyon near the Pacific Ocean.

The film marked Glaum's first role as a "vamp" and her first starring role in the new features of the day.

== Plot ==
Mademoiselle Poppea (played by Glaum) is the leading ballerina of the Imperial Ballet in Calcutta, India. Her beauty and charm bring to her many admirers, among them a British soldier, Captain Drake (played by Keenan), and an Indian prince, Yar Khan (played by Mayall), of the Bengalese Dragoons.

Although she loves Drake, Poppea agrees to marry the prince because of his title, wealth and high social standing. She keeps Drake as her lover, however, and he visits her regularly at the palace.

When the prince is ordered to transfer, he and Poppea go to live in the South. She finds the climate and culture repulsive and is bored and disgusted with her devoted husband. She then writes to Drake and begs him to come see her. Feigning illness, he takes leave from his military duties and travels to Poppea.

The prince is pleased to see Drake and receives him warmly. By accident, he discovers the adulterous relationship between Drake and his wife. As revenge, he pours two glasses of wine and puts arsenic into one. He then tells Poppea to select which glass each man will drink. Unknowingly, she selects the poisoned glass for Drake. After the toast, the prince watches as Drake has a horrible death. He disposes of Drake's body and forces his devastated wife, Poppea, to flee out into the desert.

== Cast ==
- Louise Glaum as Mlle. Poppea
- Harry Keenan as Capt. Drake
- Herschel Mayall as Yar Khan
- J. Frank Burke in an undetermined role

== Reviews ==
A Los Angeles Times review of Sunday, August 15, 1915, reads:

"The Toast of Death, a stirring drama of romance, intrigue and jealousy, will be the photoplay presented at the Woodley Theater for the week beginning tomorrow. Life in India is vividly portrayed in this interesting picture.

Troops of camels, elephants and horses, India dragoons and other scenes of magnificence, among which is the one depicting the famous imperial ballet, in Calcutta, are shown. The story is of a wealthy prince of India of high social standing, who weds a ballet dancer.

Louise Glaum will play the leading part, supported by Herschel Mayall and Harry G. Keenan."

Another Times review of Tuesday, August 17, 1915, reads:

"The Toast of Death, a romance of India, is a tremendously tense story, featuring one of the ablest leading women in pictures, Louise Glaum, at the Woodley Theater this week. She plays the role of Poppea and gives a performance that is truly fascinating.

The opening act reveals this beautiful young screen actress as the leader of the imperial ballet, whose beauty and charm bring to her many admirers. Thenceforward the audience follows the story through many complicated and highly interesting situations."

== See also ==
- List of American films of 1915
