= Charles O. Baumann =

American film producer (1874–1931)

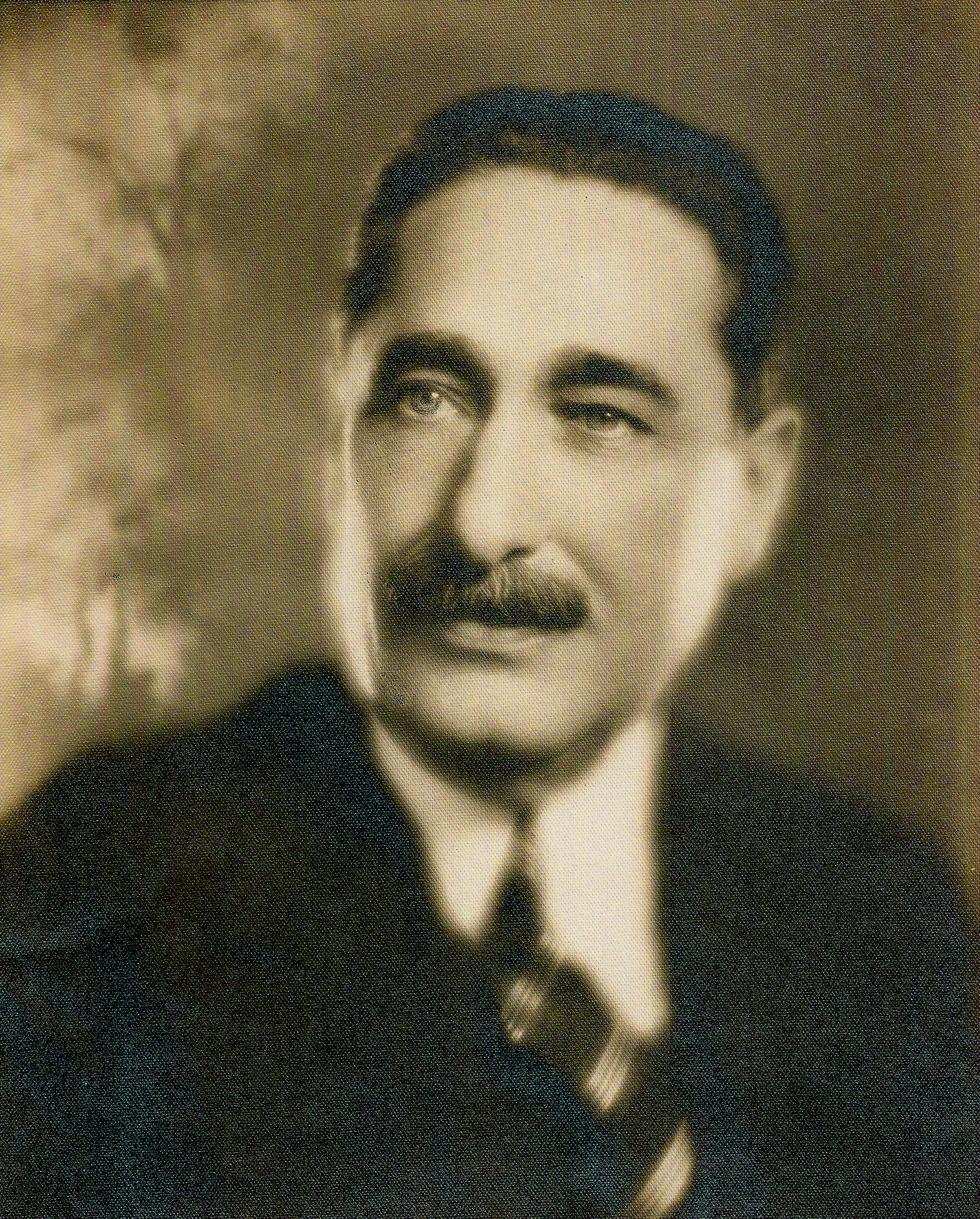
- Born: January 20, 1874; New York City, New York
- Died: July 18, 1931 (aged 57); New York City, U.S.
- Occupations: Film studio executive, film producer
- Years active: 1908–1920

Charles O. Baumann (January 20, 1874 – July 18, 1931) was an American film producer, film studio executive, and pioneer in the motion picture industry.

== Biography ==
=== Career ===
He was a partner in the Crescent Film Company formed in 1908 and in the Bison Life Motion Pictures production company formed in 1909. He co-founded New York Motion Picture Company with Adam Kessel in 1909. Intended to be a distributor it turned to production after difficulties with Thomas Edison's production company. In 1912, he was a founder and the first president of Universal Film Manufacturing Company (now Universal Studios).

One of his most-successful companies was the Keystone Film Company, the production unit headed by Mack Sennett, which produced the first films to feature Charlie Chaplin. Adam Kessel and Baumann's New York Motion Picture Company produced many films under a number of brand names, including Broncho, Domino and Kay-Bee Pictures. Other companies formed by Baumann include the 101 Bison Company and Reliance Motion Picture Corporation.

In the mid-1910s, Kessel and Baumann also branched into film distribution with their Mutual Film Corporation, which later was absorbed into Triangle Film Corporation. Baumann continued in production in the early 1920s as a partner in the Kessel-Baumann Picture Corporation production company.

=== Death ===
He died on July 18, 1931, of influenza in New York City.
