= A Brass Button =

1911 film

A Brass Button is a 1911 American social drama film in one reel, released on February 1, 1911. It was produced by Reliance Film Company. The actors are James Kirkwood and probably Marion Leonard.
