= Adam Kessel =

American film executive (1866–1946)

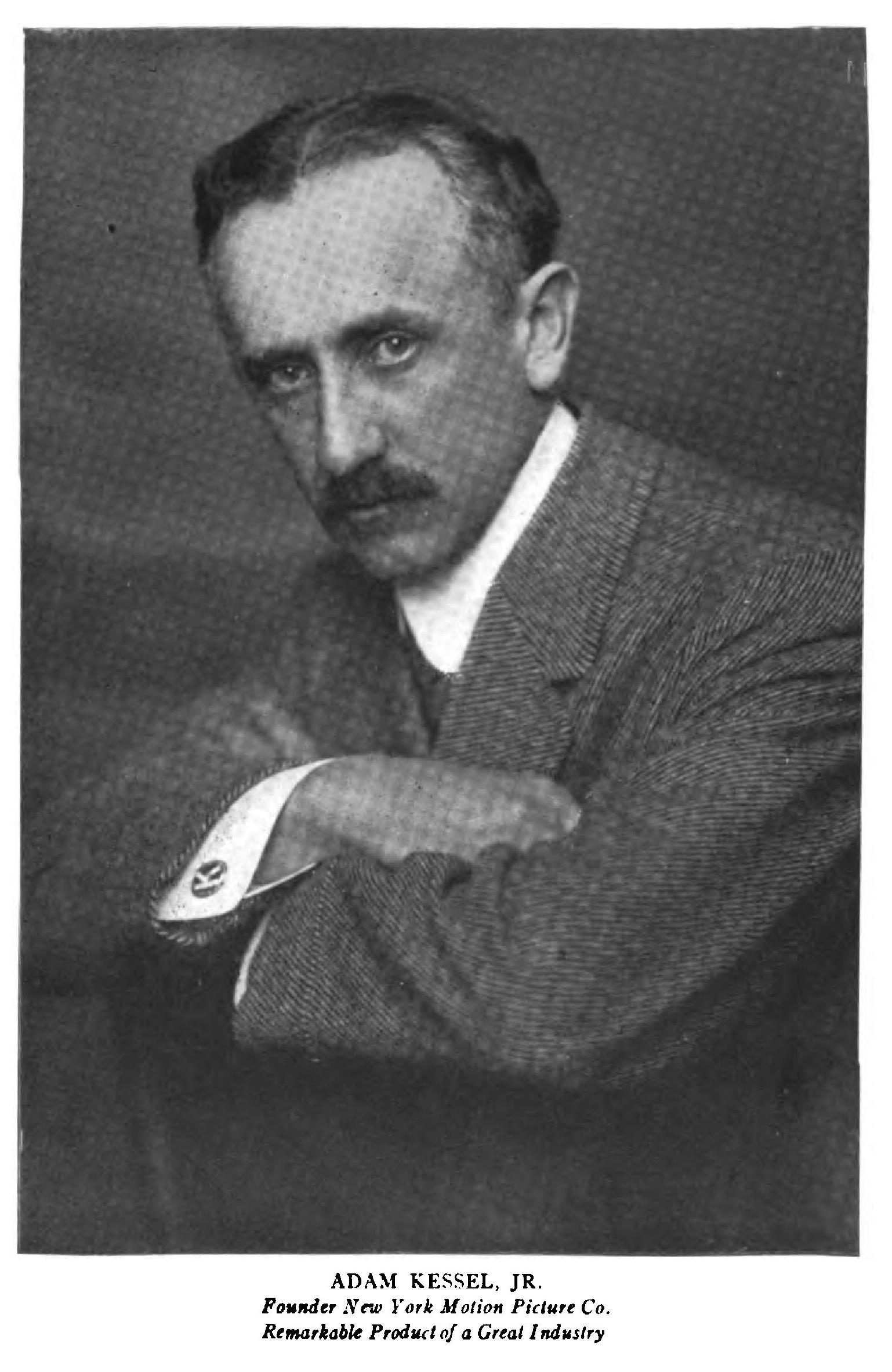
Adam Kessel Jr.

Adam Kessel Jr. (1866–1946) was a film company executive. He partnered with Charles Baumann in a series of film distribution and production companies.

Kessel was one of the founders of the New York Motion Picture Company in 1909. The Kay-Bee brand was based on Kessel and Baumann's last names.

Bauman and Kessel partnered with Mack Sennett and Thomas Ince, as well as Adam's brother Charles Kessel, sharing ownership of the newly established Keystone Film Company in 1912. The four major players also partnered on Alco Film Corporation and the group joined with Harry Aitken to form Triangle Film Corporation.

He died in Keeseville, New York.
