= Jane Fearnley =

American stage and film actress (c. 1885–1952)

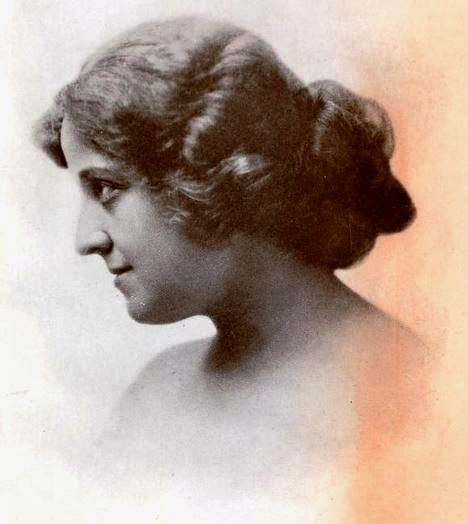
- Born: Sadie J. Fearnley c. 1885; Fall River, Massachusetts, U.S.
- Died: 1952; New York City, New York, U.S.
- Other name: Jane Fernley
- Education: Dean Academy
- Occupation: Actress
- Years active: 1907–c. 1922
- Spouses: Richard Clark, Charles Carey

Jane Fearnley (née Sadie J. Fearnley; c. 1885–1952), was an American stage and film actress who appeared in silent films. Her name was sometimes spelled Jane Fernley.

== Early life and education ==
Fearnley was born Sadie J. around 1885 in Fall River, Massachusetts, the daughter of Joseph and Sarah who immigrated to the United States from England. She graduated from Dean Academy in 1904.

== Career ==
After college, Fearnley moved to New York City and began her acting career performing both on stage and film until the early 1920's. In 1907 she made her national debut in the leading role in the play Raffles as Gwendolin Conron with S. Miller Kent, then in 1909 as Hope Georgia in the play The Gentleman from Mississippi.

After tiring of traveling, she joined Reliance Film Company, later joining Independent Moving Pictures (IMP) and the Famous Players Film Company among others. By 1913, she had solidified herself as a leading film actress, often starring opposite King Baggot in films such as the Human Hearts, Lady Audrey's Secret and A Cave Man Wooing. She was also noted for her roles in The Little Gray Lady and The Scales of Justice. She returned to the stage 1916, touring with a company playing the role of Ruth Goldman in Potash and Perlmutter then in the early 1920s as Mrs. Marshall in Irene.

== Personal life ==
Fearnley married twice, first to Richard Clark in 1907 then to Charles Carey in 1923. Pearl White lived with Fearnely for a short time around 1913 and traveled to Bermuda together. In 1952 Fearnley died while residing New York City, outside of Harlem.

== Filmography ==
- Making Good (1912)
- In Old Tennessee (1912)
- Human Hearts (1912)
- Lady Audrey's Secret (1912)
- King, the Detective and the Opium Smugglers (1912)
- Officer 174 (1912)
- Jealousy (1912), part of the Library of Congress' film collection
- A Cave Man Wooing (1912)
- The New Magdalen(1912)
- In a Woman's Power (1913)
- The Stranglers of Paris (1913) as Mathilde
- The Golden Pathway (1913)
- Kathleen Mavourneen (1913 film)
- The Christian (1914)
- The Little Gray Lady (1914)
- The Scales of Justice (1914)
- The Marble Heart (1915)
- Bubbles (1916)
- The Black Stork (1917)
- The Eternal Sin (1917)
