= Thomas H. Ince filmography =

This is a filmography of Thomas H. Ince (1882–1924), pioneering American silent film producer, director, screenwriter, and actor.

Ince was active in the earliest days of the industry, involved with more than 100 films, and a pioneering studio mogul. Known as the "Father of the Western", he invented many mechanisms of professional movie production, for instance introducing early Hollywood to the "assembly line" system of film making.

With much of his work likely to remain undocumented, misattributed, and/or lost, this filmography is incomplete.

== Actor ==
- The Seven Ages (1905)
- Richard III (1908)
- The Cardinal's Conspiracy (1909)
- King Lear (1909)
- His New Lid (1910)
- The Englishman and the Girl (1910)
- Bar Z's New Cook (1911)
- For Her Brother's Sake (1911)
- Their First Misunderstanding (1911)
- The Gangsters and the Girl (1914)

== Director ==
- Artful Kate (1911)
- Behind the Stockade (1911)
- The Brand (1911)
- A Dog's Tale (1911)
- The Fisher-Maid (1911)
- For Her Brother's Sake (1911)
- Her Darkest Hour (1911)
- The Hidden Trail (1911)
- His Nemesis (1911)
- The House That Jack Built (1911)
- In Old Madrid (1911)
- In the Sultan's Garden (1911)
- Little Nell's Tobacco (1911)
- Maid or Man (1911)
- A Manly Man (1911)
- Message in the Bottle (1911)
- New Cook (1911)
- Over the Hills (1911)
- The Penniless Prince (1911)
- Sweet Memories (1911)
- The Aggressor (1911)
- Across the Plains (1911)
- The Dream (1911)
- Their First Misunderstanding (1911)
- Tracked (1911)
- At a Quarter of Two (1911) also known as Mr. Burglar, M.D. - attributed to Ince
- The Battle of the Red Men (1912)
- Blazing the Trail (1912)
- The Clod (1912)
- The Colonel's Son (1912)
- The Colonel's Ward (1912)
- A Double Reward (1912)
- The Empty Water Keg (1912)
- For Freedom of Cuba (1912)
- For the Cause (1912)
- The Law of the West (1912)
- A Mexican Tragedy (1912)
- War on the Plains (1912)
- The Invaders (1912)
- The Altar of Death (1912)
- The Sergeant's Boy (1912)
- Custer's Last Fight, also known as Custer's Last Raid (1912)
- The Desert (1912)
- The Colonel's Peril (1912)
- His Message (1912)
- Soldier's Honor (1912)
- The Outcast (1912)
- The Lieutenant's Last Fight (1912)
- The Post Telegraphers (1912)
- The Deserter (1912)
- The Crisis (1912)
- The Indian Massacre / Heart of an Indian (1912)
- The Tables Turned (1912)
- Through the Flames (1912)
- The Kid and the Sleuth (1912)
- The Ambassador's Envoy (1913)
- The Boomerang (1913)
- Bread Cast Upon the Waters (1913)
- Days of '49 (1913)
- Granddad (1913)
- The Hateful God (1913)
- A Shadow of the Past (1913)
- In Love and War / Call to Arms (1913)
- The Battle of Gettysburg (1913)
- The Drummer of the 8th (1913)
- The Hour of Reckoning (1914)
- The Last of the Line (1914)
- The Village 'Neath the Sea (1914)
- Out of the Night (1914)
- The Death Mask (1914)
- The Coward (1915)
- The Toast of Death (1915)
- The Cup of Life (1915)
- The Alien / The Sign of the Rose (1915)
- The Devil / Satan's Pawn (1915)
- Dividend (1916)
- Civilization (1916)
- The Stepping Stone (1916)
- Peggy (1916)
- Anna Christie (1923)
- Flicker Flashbacks No. 1 (1947) (archive footage from Behind the Stockade, 1909)

== Writer ==
- Little Nell's Tobacco (1910)
- For the Queen's Honor (1911)
- The Fortunes of War (1911)
- The Forged Dispatch (1911)
- The Stampede (1911)
- Across the Plains (1911)
- Sweet Memories (1911)
- The Mirror (1911)
- Bar Z's New Cook (1911)
- The Army Surgeon (1912)
- The Altar of Death (1912)
- The Outcast (1912)
- The Deserter (1912)
- The Battle of the Red Men (1912)
- The Indian Massacre (1912)
- War on the Plains (1912)
- The Battle of Gettysburg (1913)
- In the Sage Brush Country (1914)
- The Last of the Line (1914)
- A Political Feud (1914)
- The Fortunes of War (1914)
- The Bargain (1914)
- The Vigil (1914)
- The Mills of the Gods (1914)
- The Worth of a Life (1914)
- The Word of His People (1914)
- Stacked Cards (1914)
- The Winning of Denise (1914)
- An Eleventh Hour Reformation (1914)
- The City (1914)
- The Curse of Humanity (1914)
- The Voice at the Telephone (1914)
- The Wrath of the Gods (1914)
- The Latent Spark (1914)
- In the Cow Country (1914)
- Out of the Night (1914)
- Shorty Escapes Marriage (1914)
- The Rightful Heir (1914)
- Wolves of the Underworld (1914)
- The Gringo (1914)
- Desert Gold (1914)
- O Mimi San (1914)
- The Hammer (1915)
- Tools of Providence (1915)
- The Reward (1915)
- The Conversion of Frosty Blake (1915)
- Bad Buck of Santa Ynez (1915)
- The Cup of Life (1915)
- The Taking of Luke McVane (1915)
- On the Night Stage (1915)
- The Spirit of the Bell (1915)
- The Roughneck (1915)
- The Devil (1915)
- Tricked (1915)
- In the Switch Tower (1915)
- The Girl Who Might Have Been (1915)
- Satan McAllister's Heir (1915)
- Winning Back (1915)
- The Sheriff's Streak of Yellow (1915)
- The Grudge (1915)
- Mr. 'Silent' Haskins (1915)
- The Scourge of the Desert (1915)
- A Confidence Game (1915)
- The Italian (1915)
- The Despoiler (1915)
- Aloha Oe (1915)
- The Disciple (1915)
- The Coward (1915)
- Keno Bates, Liar (1915)
- The Living Wage (1915)
- A Knight of the Trails (1915)
- The $100,000 Bill (1915)
- Cash Parrish's Pal (1915)
- The Ruse (1915)
- The Deserter (1916)
- The Last Act (1916)
- Bullets and Brown Eyes (1916)
- Ashes of Hope (1917)
- The Family Skeleton (1918)
