= Violet Horner =

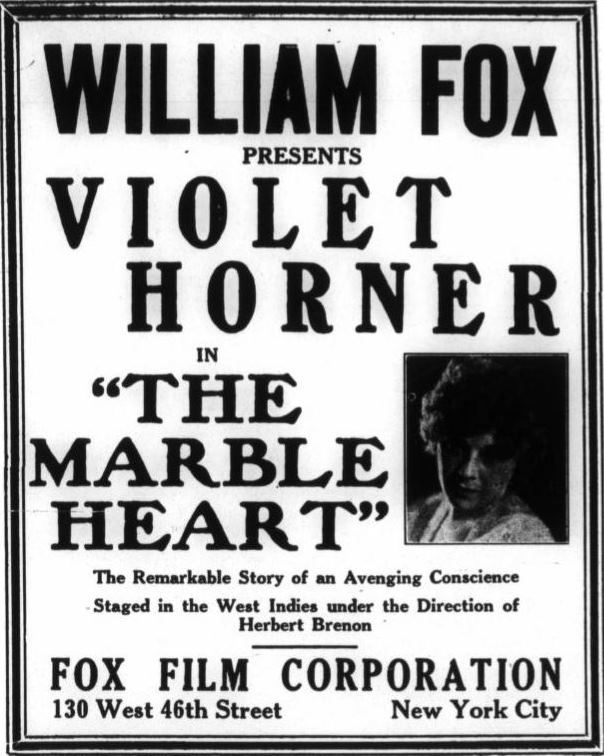
The Marble Heart (1916)

Still from The Man from the West (1912)

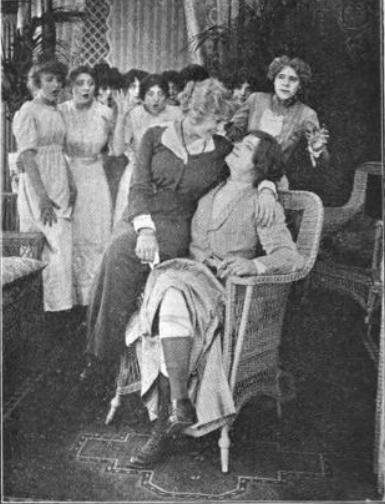
Still from Billy's Adventure

Violet Horner (1892 – 1970) was an American silent film actress. She had several starring roles including in one of the Lena Rivers films (based on the Mary Jane Holmes novel) released in 1914 and a series of films made with Billy Quirk for Gem Motion Picture Company including Billy's Adventure.

Her father was an engineer and she spent some of her youth living with him in Brazil. She began her career in theater.

She worked for IMP and Fox Film studios.

== Filmography ==
- How Ned Got the Raise (1912), an extant film
- The Man from the West (1912)
- The Bald Headed Club (1912)
- A Cave Man Wooing (1912)
- The Castaway (1912 film)
- The Bridal Room (1912), as Mary Carter
- Damages in Full (1913)
- Billy's Adventure (1913), one in a series of films made by actors Billy Quirk and Violet Horner for the Gem Motion Picture Company
- Bob's Baby (1913), as Mrs. Robert Waring
- A Modern Romance (1913)
- She Slept Through It All (1913)
- Lena Rivers (1914 Whitman film)
- The Ring and the Man (1914), as Eleanor
- Shore Acres (1914)
- The Garden of Lies (1915), as Jessica Mannering
- The Stolen Voice (1915), an extant film
- Tillie the Terrible Typist (1915)
- The Girl from Alaska (1915)
- The Marble Heart (film) (1916)
- A Daughter of the Gods (1916), as Zarrah
- The Fighting Chance (1916)
- Enlighten Thy Daughter (1917), as Mrs. Laurence
