= Isabel Rea =

American film actress

- Rea in 1915
- Born: February 13, 1889; Coxsackie, New York, US
- Died: September 14, 1961 (aged 72); Coxsackie, New York, US
- Other name: Isabel Rae
- Occupation: Actress
- Years active: 1910–1918

Isabel Rea (born 1889 in Coxsackie, New York), also sometimes credited as Isabel Rae, was an American film actress of the silent era, specifically the decade of the 1910s. In Daniel Blum's A Pictorial History of the Silent Screen she is credited in a photograph as Isabel Rea, member of the original Independent Moving Pictures (IMP) Film Company in 1911, alongside actors such as Mary Pickford. Further in the book she is credited as Isabel Rae in a photograph for Universal Studios.

Apart from her work in silent films, little is known of her and her whereabouts after approximately 1918. She died September 14, 1961, in Coxsackie at the age of 72, under the name Isabelle Copleston.

== Selected filmography ==
- For the Sunday Edition (1910)
- Pictureland (1911)
- Under the Gaslight (1914)
- The Siren (1917)

== Bibliography ==
- Blum, Daniel. A Pictorial History of the Silent Screen. Wattle Books, 1982.
