= The Scarlet Letter (1911 film) =

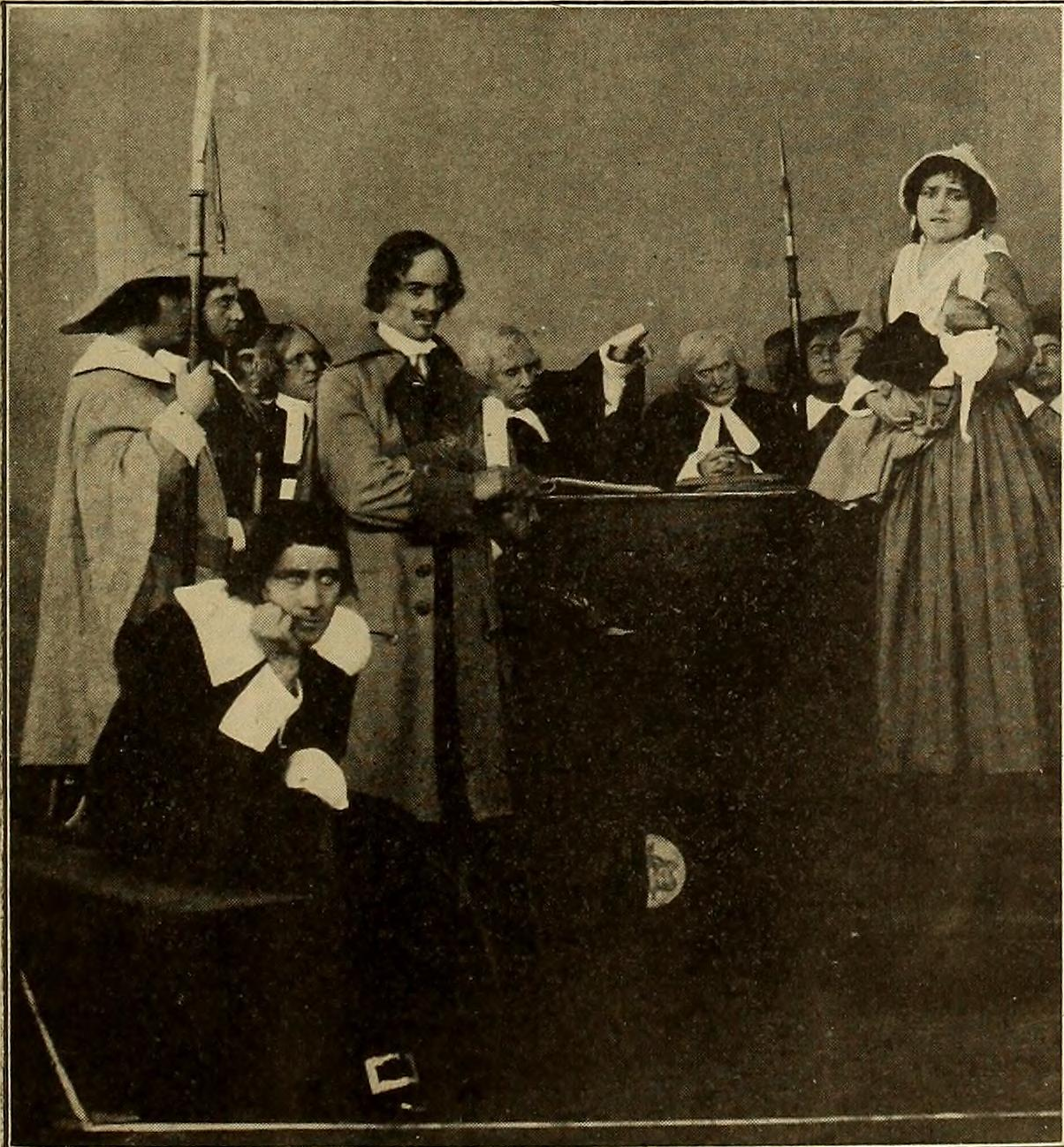
- Directed by: Joseph W. Smiley; George Loane Tucker
- Written by: Herbert Brenon
- Starring: King Baggot; Lucille Young; William Robert Daly
- Production company: IMP Studios
- Distributed by: Motion Picture Distributors and Sales Company
- Release date: April 27, 1911
- Running time: Approx. 15 minutes (1 reel)
- Country: United States
- Languages: Silent; English intertitles

The Scarlet Letter is a 1911 American silent drama short film starring King Baggot, Lucille Young, and William Robert Daly.

Directed by Joseph W. Smiley and George Loane Tucker and produced by Carl Laemmle's IMP Studios, the screenplay was adapted by Herbert Brenon based on the historical 1850 novel of the same title by Nathaniel Hawthorne.

This second silent version of The Scarlet Letter was IMP's first "IMP Film De Luxe." While only 1000 feet (300 m) in length, it was at that time considered a feature film. It was a critical success and showcased IMP star King Baggot as a serious actor.

== Synopsis ==
Set in 17th-century Massachusetts, it is the classic story of a young woman, Hester Prynne, who is forced by her Puritan community to wear a scarlet "A" (for adultery) because she had a daughter by another man while her husband was away.

== Cast ==
- King Baggot as Reverend Dimmesdale
- Lucille Young as Hester Prynne
- William Robert Daly as Roger
- Anita Hendrie as (undetermined role)
- Robert Z. Leonard as (undetermined role)
- J. Farrell MacDonald as (undetermined role)
