= The Man from the West (1912 film) =

1912 American silent film

The Man of the West
- Still from The Man from the West and featured in 1912 issue of The Implet
- Directed by: Otis Turner
- Written by: J.W. Culbertson
- Produced by: Otis Turner; Carl Laemmle; Independent Moving Pictures
- Starring: King Baggot; Vivian Prescott; Violet Horner
- Distributed by: Motion Picture Distributors and Sales Company
- Release date: March 18, 1912
- Country: United States
- Languages: Silent; English intertitles

The Man of the West is a 1912 American silent film starring King Baggot and directed by Otis Turner. It was produced by Independent Moving Pictures (IMP).
