= The Lie (1912 film) =

1912 American film by King Baggot

- Directed by: King Baggot; William Robert Daly
- Written by: A. Castlebaum
- Produced by: IMP Studios
- Starring: King Baggot; Lottie Briscoe
- Distributed by: Motion Picture Distributors and Sales Company
- Release date: February 22, 1912
- Running time: Approx. 15 min. (1 reel)
- Country: United States
- Languages: Silent; English intertitles

The Lie (1912) is a silent war drama/romance motion picture short starring King Baggot and Lottie Briscoe.

Directed by King Baggot and William Robert Daly and produced by Carl Laemmle's IMP Studios, the screenplay was written by A. Castlebaum.

== Synopsis ==
The Lie is set during the American Civil War.

== Cast ==
- King Baggot as Captain Robert Evans
- Lottie Briscoe as Edith Hobson
- William E. Shay as Lieutenant Hobson
- William Robert Daly as Mr. Hobson
