= Absinthe (1914 film) =

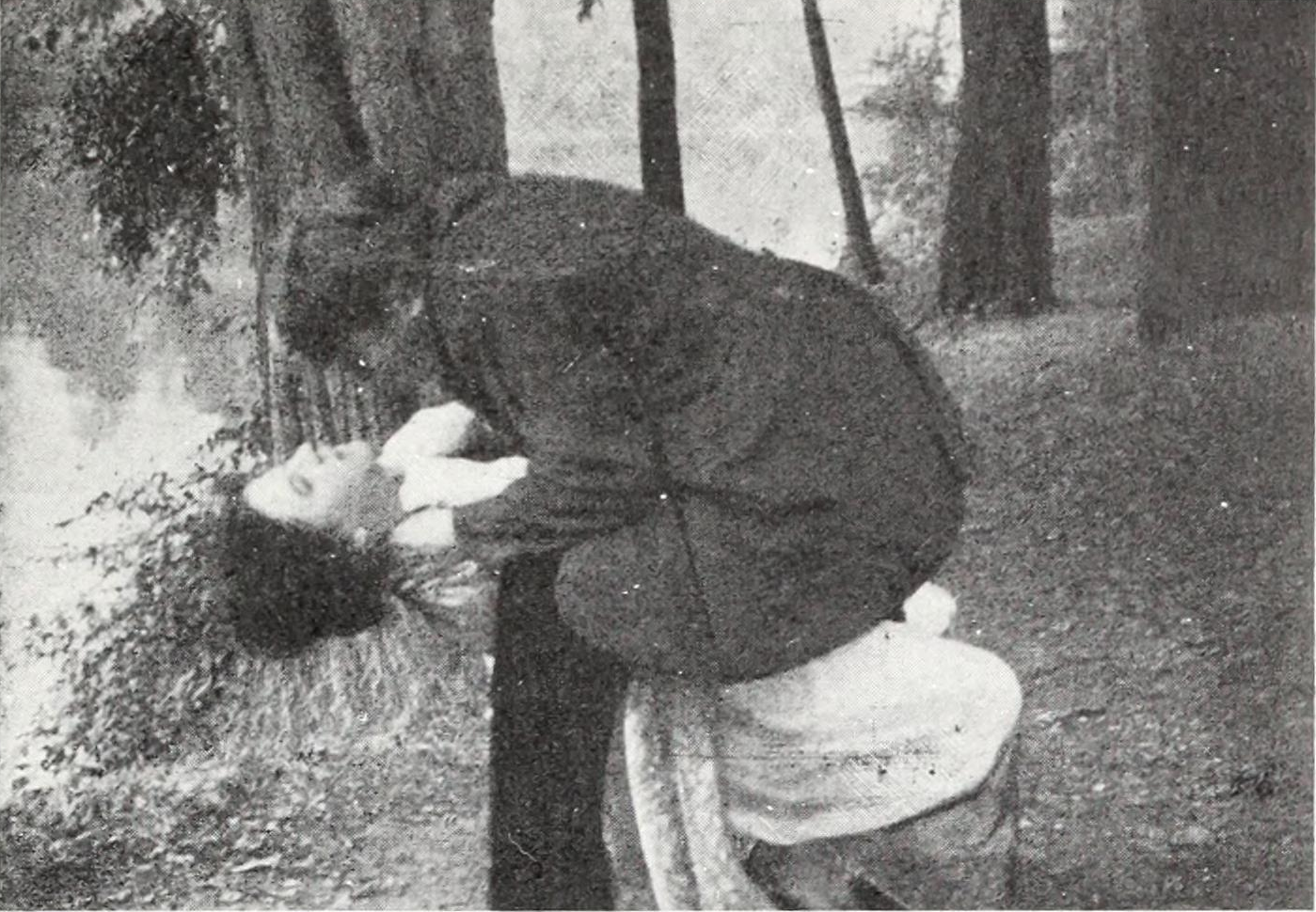
- Publicity still
- Directed by: Herbert Brenon
- Written by: Herbert Brenon (scenario)
- Produced by: Herbert Brenon; Carl Laemmle
- Starring: King Baggot; Leah Baird
- Cinematography: William C. Thompson
- Production company: Independent Moving Pictures Company
- Distributed by: Universal Film Manufacturing Company
- Release date: January 22, 1914 (United States)
- Running time: Four reels
- Country: United States
- Languages: Silent; English intertitles

Absinthe is a 1914 American silent drama film starring King Baggot and Leah Baird and directed by Herbert Brenon. Some sources also credit George Edwardes-Hall as a director.

== Plot ==
A Parisian artist becomes addicted to the liquor absinthe and sinks to robbery and murder.

== Cast ==
- King Baggot as Jean Dumas
- Leah Baird as Yvonne Fournier
