= The Bridal Room =

- Directed by: William Robert Daly ?King Baggot
- Produced by: Carl Laemmle
- Starring: King Baggot; Violet Horner
- Distributed by: Universal Film Manufacturing Company; J. F. Brockliss (1913 UK)
- Release date: October 10, 1912
- Running time: 1 reel
- Country: United States
- Language: Silent..English intertitless

The Bridal Room is a 1912 American silent drama short film directed by William Robert Daly and some sources credit King Baggot both of whom have roles in the film. It was produced by Carl Laemmle of IMP, a forerunner of Universal Pictures.

This film is preserved at the Library of Congress, Packard Campus for Audio-Visual Conservation.

== Cast ==
- King Baggot - Tom Walsh
- Violet Horner - Mary Carter
- Mrs. Allen Walker - Sarah Walsh (*billed as Lucille Walker)
- William Robert Daly - Pietro
- Tom McEvoy - Frank Stone
- James Kirkwood - unknown role
