= Up Against It (1912 film) =

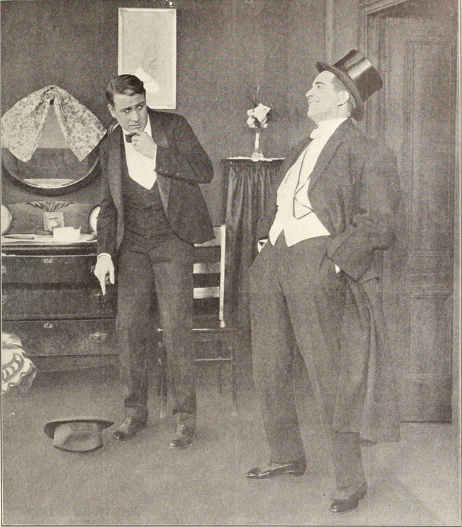
- King Baggot and William Robert Daly in a scene from the film. This still was originally published in The Implet.
- Directed by: Otis Turner
- Written by: George Elmore
- Produced by: Carl Laemmle; Independent Moving Pictures
- Starring: King Baggot; Vivian Prescott; William Robert Daly; William E. Shay
- Distributed by: Motion Picture Distributors and Sales Company
- Release date: June 1, 1912
- Country: United States
- Languages: Silent; English intertitles

Up Against It is a 1912 American romantic comedy short film directed by Otis Turner and starring King Baggot. It was produced by the Independent Moving Pictures (IMP) Company of New York.

As of 2012, a print of this film survives, with Dutch intertitles, in the holdings of the EYE Film Institute Netherlands in Amsterdam.
