= William Robert Daly =

American actor and director (1872–1935)

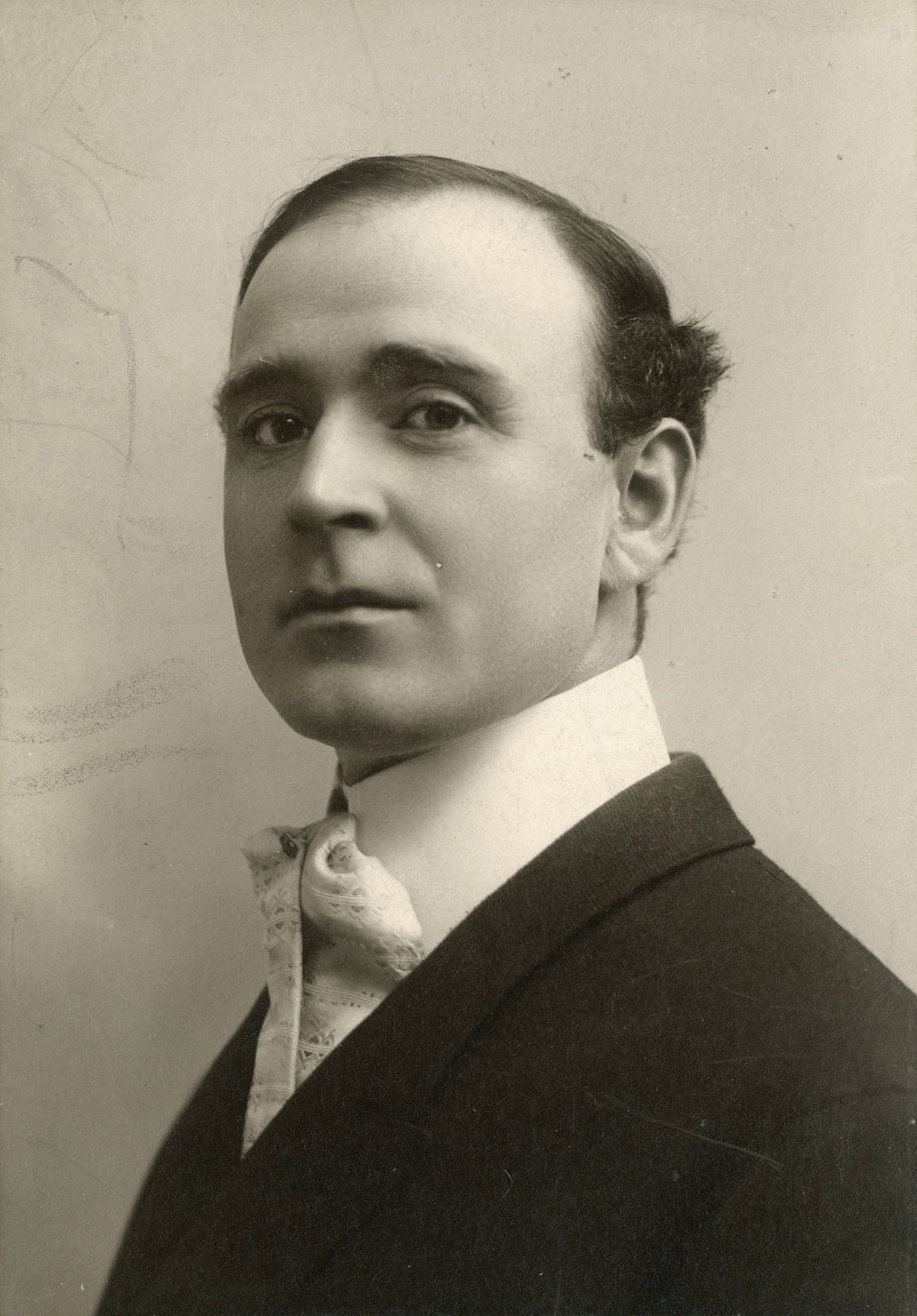
- Daly c.1904
- Born: William Robert Dailey; October 24, 1872; Boston, Massachusetts, U.S.
- Died: 1935 (aged 62–63)
- Occupations: Actor, director
- Years active: 1891–1932
- Spouse(s): Eva Condon; Fritzi Brunette

William Robert Daly (born William Robert Dailey; October 24, 1872 – 1935) was an actor and director of silent films.

== Early life ==
Daly was born on October 24, 1872, in Boston, Massachusetts, as William Robert Dailey.

== Career ==
He became a "stage director" at 19 years-old. He directed the 1914 film adaptation of Uncle Tom's Cabin featuring the first lead role for an African American actor in a feature film for white audiences. Sam Lucas, who had played Uncle Tom in theatrical productions, played the part.

Daly portrayed the villain in the 1912 film The Kid and the Sleuth. He worked as a producer with William Selig in 1916. For Selig's 1916 film At Piney Ridge, Daly directed and produced. It was an adaption by Gilson Willets David K Higgins' theater production and Daly "escorted a company of players to the heart of the Tenn mtns where true scenes of mtneer life were filmed".

He served on the board of The Screen Club and was photographed among its members in 1912. In 1915, he was a director for the Dramatic Book film company in Santa Barabara. He is pictured in a movie still lobby card from the 1922 film Pardon My Nerve.

== Personal life ==
He married actress Eva Condon and then remarried with Fritzi Brunette. He died in 1935.

== Filmography ==
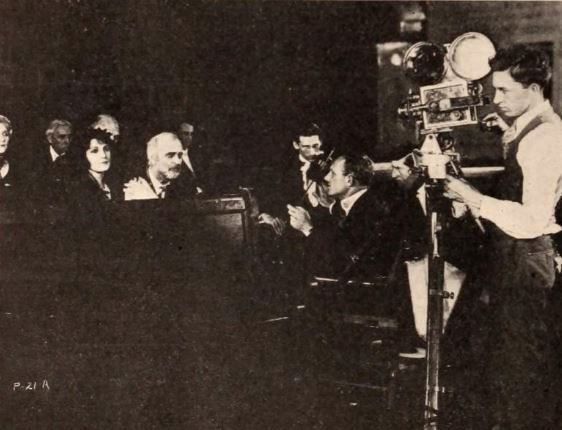
With Leatrice Joy in Down Home (1920)

=== Director ===
- Percy Learns to Waltz (1912)
- The Lie (1912), co-directing credit with King Baggot
- The Bridal Room (1912)
- Uncle Tom's Cabin (1914)
- Unto Those Who Sin (1916)
- His Brother's Keeper (1916)
- At Piney Ridge (1916)

=== Actor ===
- The Scarlet Letter (1911)
- The Dream (1911)
- A Cave Man Wooing (1912)
- Up Against It (1912)
- The Lid and the Sleuth (1912)
- Back of the Shadow (1915), short)
- Down Home (1920), as Joe Pelot (credited as Robert Daly)
- Action (1921) as J. Plimsoll
- The Roof Tree (1921)
- The Yellow Stain (1922)
- Her Night of Nights (1922), as Pop Mahone
- Confidence (1922)
- A Dangerous Game (1922)
- Pardon My Nerve (1922)
- Cross Wires (1923) as Pat Murphy
- Sawdust (1923) as 'Speck' Dawson
- The Wild Party (1923)
- Trifling with Honor (1923), as The Kid's Father
- Held to Answer (1923), as The Organist (as Robert Daly)
- Ride for Your Life (1924), as Dan Donnegan
- Camille of the Barbary Coast (1925), as Chauncey Hilburn

=== Executive producer ===
- Traffic in Souls (1913)

=== Producer ===
- At Piney Ridge (1916)
