= A Cave Man Wooing =

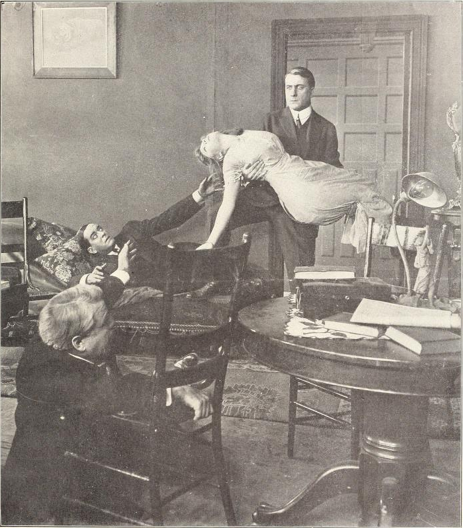
- A scene from the film, originally published in The Implet in May, 1912.
- Directed by: Otis Turner
- Written by: B.M. Connors
- Produced by: Carl Laemmle; Independent Moving Pictures
- Starring: King Baggot; Violet Horner; William Robert Daly; William E. Shay; Jane Fearnley
- Distributed by: Motion Picture Distributing and Sales Company
- Release date: May 20, 1912
- Running time: 12 minutes
- Country: United States
- Languages: Silent; English intertitles

A Cave Man Wooing is a 1912 American silent comedy short film starring King Baggot and directed by Otis Turner. It was produced by Independent Moving Pictures (IMP).

As of 2012, a print of this film survives, with Dutch intertitles, in the holdings of the EYE Film Institute Netherlands in Amsterdam.

== Plot ==
George a timid man who falls for the beautiful and athletic Clarice. After taking a course in physical culture, George manages to overcome his rivals for Clarice's attention.

== Cast ==
- King Baggot as George - the 'Sissy Hero'
- Violet Horner as Clarice - George's Sweetheart
- William Robert Daly as Prof. S. Trong (billed as William R. Daly)
- William E. Shay as Sam
- Jane Fearnley as The Annoyed Neighbor
