= Gold Is Not All =

1913 short film by Wilfred Lucas

- Directed by: Wilfred Lucas
- Produced by: Carl Laemmle
- Production company: Independent Moving Pictures Co. of America
- Distributed by: Universal Film Manufacturing Company
- Release date: January 30, 1913 (U.S.)
- Country: Canada

Gold Is Not All is a 1913 Canadian short drama silent black and white film directed by Wilfred Lucas and produced by Carl Laemmle.

== Cast ==
- King Baggot as Karl - the Composer
- Jane Gail as The Girl
- Bess Meredyth as The Slavey
- William Cavanaugh as The Miser Uncle
- Frank Russell as The Director
- William Cowper as The Artist
- William R. Dunn as Mr. Rich
- Harry Fisher as The Writer
