= The Scales of Justice (film) =

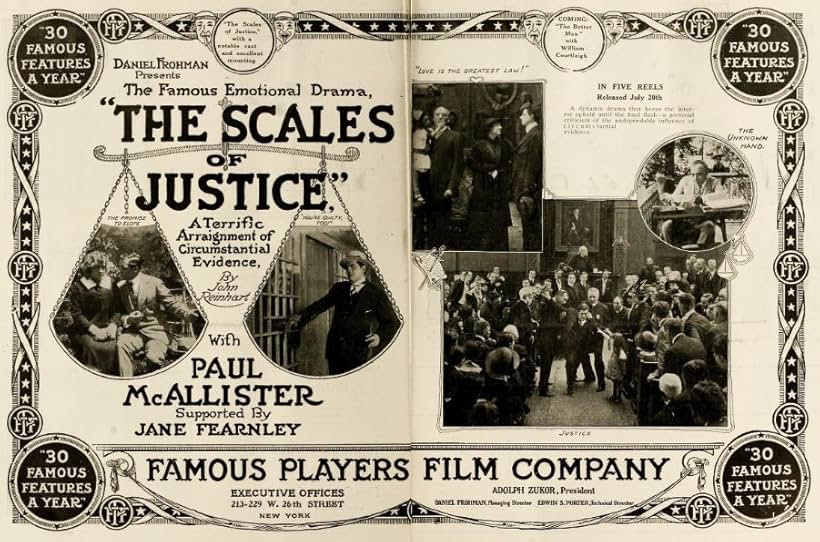
- Directed by: Thomas N. Heffron
- Written by: Thomas N. Heffron
- Based on: a play by John Reinhart
- Produced by: Adolph Zukor
- Starring: Paul McAllister; Jane Fearnley; Harold Lockwood
- Distributed by: State Rights
- Release date: July 20, 1914
- Running time: 5 reels
- Country: USA

The Scales of Justice is a lost 1914 American silent drama film directed by Thomas N. Heffron and starring Paul McAllister, a stage actor. It was produced by Adolph Zukor and distributed on State Rights basis.

== Cast ==
- Paul McAllister - Robert Darrow
- Jane Fearnley - Edith Russell Dexter
- Harold Lockwood - Frank Dexter
- Hal Clarendon - Walter Elliott
- Mark Price - Philip Russell
- Katherine Lee - Alice Dexter (as Catherine Lee)
- Mary Blackburn - Angelina
- Beatrice Moreland - Miss Tripp
- Daniel Jarrett - Bill Crump
