= The Little Gray Lady =

1914 film

- Directed by: Francis Powers
- Based on: a play The Little Gray Lady c.1906 by Channing Pollock
- Produced by: Adolph Zukor
- Starring: Jane Grey
- Distributed by: State Rights
- Release date: July 10, 1914
- Running time: 4-5 reels
- Country: USA
- Language: Silent..English titles

The Little Gray Lady is a lost 1914 silent film drama directed by Francis Powers and starring Jane Grey of the Broadway stage. It was produced by Adolph Zukor continuing his making films with Broadway actors and stars, hence the name of his company Famous Players Film Company.

== Cast ==
- Jane Grey as Anna Gray
- James Cooley as Perry Carlyle
- Jane Fearnley as Ruth Jordan
- Hal Clarendon as Sam Meade
- Julia Walcott as Mrs. Jordan
- Robert Cummings as Richard Graham
- Mathaleen Aarnold as Mrs. Graham
- Edgar Davenport as John Moore
- Sue Balfour as Mrs. Carlyle

preservation status: As with all films directed by Francis Powers prior to 1921, The Little Gray Lady is regarded as a lost film.
