= Bob's Baby =

- Starring: Jean Acker
- Release date: August 4, 1913
- Country: United States
- Language: Silent

Bob's Baby is a 1913 American comedy film.

== Plot ==
Bob, a typically devoted husband, is told by his wife that the stork has paid a visit to their household; the first time, it turns out to be a puppy; the second time, expecting another canine, he is surprised to find the more traditional offspring.

== Cast ==
Actor/Actress	Role
Glen White	Robert Waring
Violet Horner	Mrs. Robert Waring
Irene Wallace	The Maid
William Sorelle	Bob's Uncle (as William Sorrell)
Louise Mackin	Bob's Aunt (as Mrs. Mackin)
Jean Acker	Bob's Cousin
