= Lena Rivers (1914 Whitman film) =

- Written by: Mary J. Holmes, novel
- Produced by: Whitman Features
- Starring: Violet Horner
- Distributed by: Blinkhorn Photoplays Corporation
- Release date: July 11, 1914
- Running time: 5 reels
- Country: USA
- Language: Silent..English intertitles

Lena Rivers is a 1914 silent feature film produced by Whitman Features Company and starring Violet Horner. It is an early production based on the novel by Mary J. Holmes. It was the second of two features released in 1914 with this title.

It is preserved in the Library of Congress collection.

== Cast ==
- Violet Horner - Lena Rivers
- Harrish Ingraham - Durwood Belmont
- Mary Moore - Carrie Livingston
- Martin J. Faust - Harry Rivers Graham
- Mrs. Middleton - Lady Belmont
- Harry H. Forman - Mr. Livingston
- Mrs. Ford - Grandma Nichols
