= Hal Clarendon =

Actor (1876-1959)

Hal Clarendon (1876–1959) was an actor and director in the United States. He had a namesake stock theater company. He appeared in theatrical shows including as a lead. He was slated to direct The Other Man starring Hobart Henley and Irene Hunt. He was general director of the new Ruth J. MacTammany Motion Picture Company in 1916.

== Filmography ==
- Leah Kleschna (film) (1913), as Kleschna
- The Port of Doom (1913)
- A Lady of Quality (1913 film)
- The Redemption of David Corson (1914), as Andy MacFarlane
- Marta of the Lowlands (1914)
- His Last Dollar (1914)
- The Conspiracy (1914 film)
- The Little Gray Lady (1914), as Sam Meade
- The Terror of Anger (1914)
- The Scales of Justice (film) (1914), as Walter Elliott
- One of Our Girls (1914), as Comte Florian de Crebellon
- The Day of Days (film) (1914), as B. Penfield / Hajji, the beggar
- A Woman's Triumph (1914), as Georgie Robertson
- An American Citizen (1914)
- A Virgin Paradise (1921), as John Latham
- The Pride of Jennico (film) (1914), as Prince Eugen
- David Harum (1915), as Chet Timson
- I SCREAM (1934)
- Alma, Where Do You Live? (1917), director, adapted from a play
- One Day (1916 film), Prince Ronneaus, and as director
- The Corsican Brothers (1915), as Chateau Renard
- The Actor and the Rube (1915)
- Who Got Stung? (1915), as Jim
- Across the Way (1915), as Caretaker
- The Conspiracy (1914), as Morton
