= Kissed (1922 film) =

1922 film

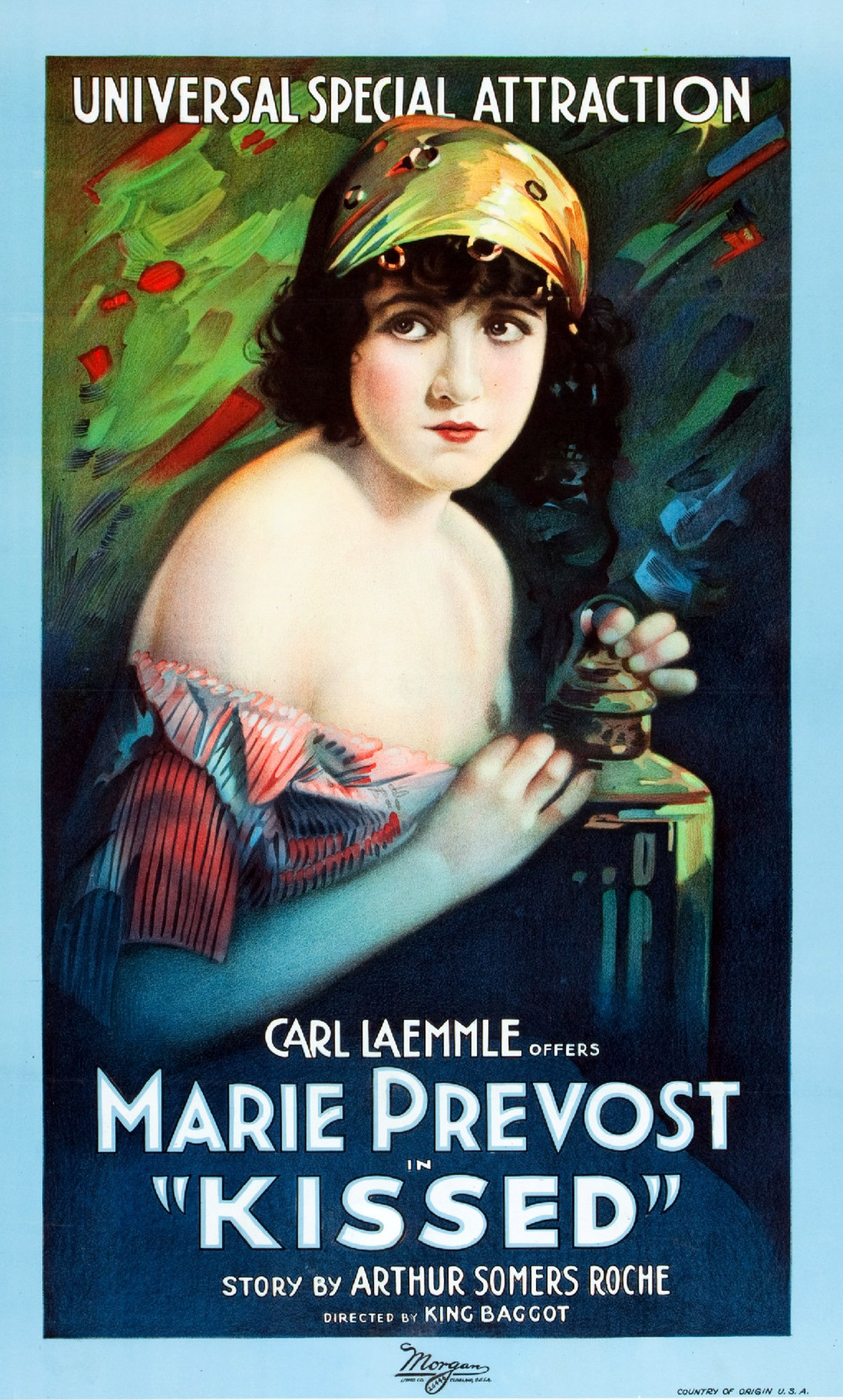
- Theatrical poster
- Directed by: King Baggot
- Written by: Doris Schroeder
- Based on: "Kissed" by Arthur Somers Roche
- Starring: Marie Prevost; Lloyd Whitlock; Lillian Langdon
- Cinematography: Ben Bail
- Production company: Universal Pictures
- Distributed by: Universal Pictures
- Release date: May 22, 1922
- Running time: 50 minutes
- Country: United States
- Language: Silent (English intertitles)

Kissed is a 1922 American silent comedy film directed by King Baggot and starring Marie Prevost, Lloyd Whitlock, and Lillian Langdon.

== Plot ==
As described in a film magazine, irrepressible young woman Constance Keener has her own ideas about choosing a husband. At a masquerade ball she is kissed by a stranger and thinks she has found her ideal. However, she is unable to determine which of three men, dressed alike, delivered the kiss. She finally decides it was Dr. Moss and agrees to elope with him. While leaving on a train she discovers, when he kisses her, that Dr. Moss is not the man from the ball. When the train is held up by a bandit and she is kissed by the "highwayman," she then finds her ideal suitor: the young millionaire Merson Torrey who originally sought her hand.

== Cast ==
- Marie Prevost as Constance Keener
- Lloyd Whitlock as Dr. Sherman Moss
- Lillian Langdon as Mrs. Keener
- J. Frank Glendon as Merson Torrey
- Arthur Hoyt as Horace Peabody
- Percy Challenger as Editor Needham
- Harold Miller as Bobb Rennesdale
- Marie Crisp as Miss Smith
- Harold Goodwin as Jim Kernochan

== Preservation ==
A copy of Kissed is held by the Museum of Modern Art.

== Bibliography ==
- Munden, Kenneth White. The American Film Institute Catalog of Motion Pictures Produced in the United States, Part 1. University of California Press, 1997.
