= In a Woman's Power =

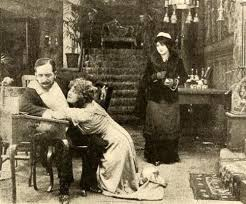
- Directed by: Herbert Brenon
- Distributed by: Universal Film Manufacturing Company
- Release date: February 13, 1913 (U.S.)
- Running time: 2 reels
- Country: United States
- Language: Silent

In a Woman's Power is a 1913 Comedy film directed by Herbert Brenon.

It was featured amongst a slate of filmed entertainment in 1913. Jean Acker was in the film.

== Cast ==
Actor/Actress	Role
William E. Shay	
Jane Fearnley	
Jean Acker	
Robert V. Ferguson	
