= Across the Way =

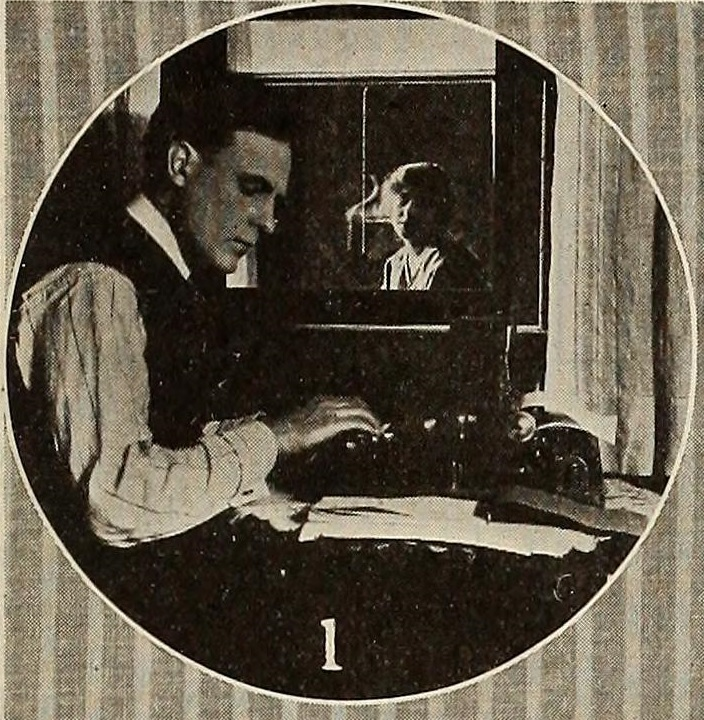
- Film still from Reel Life showing Boyd Marshall (left) and Rene Farrington (right)
- Produced by: Princess (Thanhouser Company)
- Release date: February 12, 1915
- Running time: 1 reel
- Country: United States
- Languages: Silent; English intertitles

Across the Way is a 1915 American silent short film produced by the Thanhouser Company under the Princess brand. The comedy-drama involves a man named Sparks playing a trick on his friend to make him question his sanity. The trick involves the friend's love interest being attacked by an assailant which works, but then a burglar attacks her a few days later. The friend saves his love interest from the burglar and later marries him instead of Sparks. The Princess comedy-dramas were not well-received and it was not long after the film's release that Edwin Thanhouser took a personal interest in the productions at the New Rochelle studio. Soon thereafter, the Princess brand was discontinued and replaced by the Falstaff brand. The film is presumed to be lost.

== Plot ==
The published synopsis of the film was listed in Reel Life states: "Sparks learns, upon visiting his fiancee, Bianca, an art student, that his friend, Tom Brown, a writer, is living across the court. He soon sees that Bianca and Brown are mutually attracted and plans to play a joke upon his friend, which shall make the latter doubt his own sanity. He persuades Bianca to enact a scene with him before the drawn window curtain in which she is attacked by a man with a pistol and drawing a dagger from her bosom, defends herself, killing her assailant. Brown, seeing all this in silhouette on the shade, rushes to Bianca's assistance. He finds her reading peacefully, and is told that the incident must have been an hallucination of his own brain. A few evenings after this Bianca actually is attacked by a burglar. Brown, who now is "on" to the fact that in the former instance his friend Sparks had designs upon him, at first thinks this also is another of Sparks' "jokes". However, he goes stealthily to investigate and is just in time to save the girl, who breaks her engagement to Sparks and marries Brown."

== Cast ==
- Boyd Marshall as Tom Brown
- John Reinhard as Sparks
- Rene Farrington as Bianca
- Kenneth Clarendon (Hal Clarendon) as the Caretaker
- Mr. Yorke (Jay C. Yorke) as the Burglar

== Production ==
The Princess production department of the Thanhouser Company started in 1913. It would have a film released on every Friday. Early Princess productions were mostly comedies that performed well, but the company's dramas were often unfavorable. The early Princess productions were marked by their poor scenarios that were illogically written or consisted of uninteresting material. Princess produced films out of a studio in New Rochelle from 1913 until 1915, when the production brand was changed and renamed Falstaff. The production and release of Across the Way occurred before Edwin Thanhouser returned and took personal interest in improving the quality of the productions at the New Rochelle studio. The new brand, Falstaff, would soon replace the Princess productions.

== Release and reception ==
The film was released on February 12, 1915. It was later released in The United Kingdom on July 5, 1915. The film was released nationwide with advertisements appearing in Chicago, Illinois Kansas, and Ohio.

A review in The Moving Picture World said the comedy-drama as being pleasing to watch and full of action. However, the quality of the Princess films towards the end of its productions were not pleasing the audiences. The last Princess brand film, Just Kids would be released on April 9. The film is presumed to be lost.
