= A Dangerous Game (1922 film) =

1922 silent film

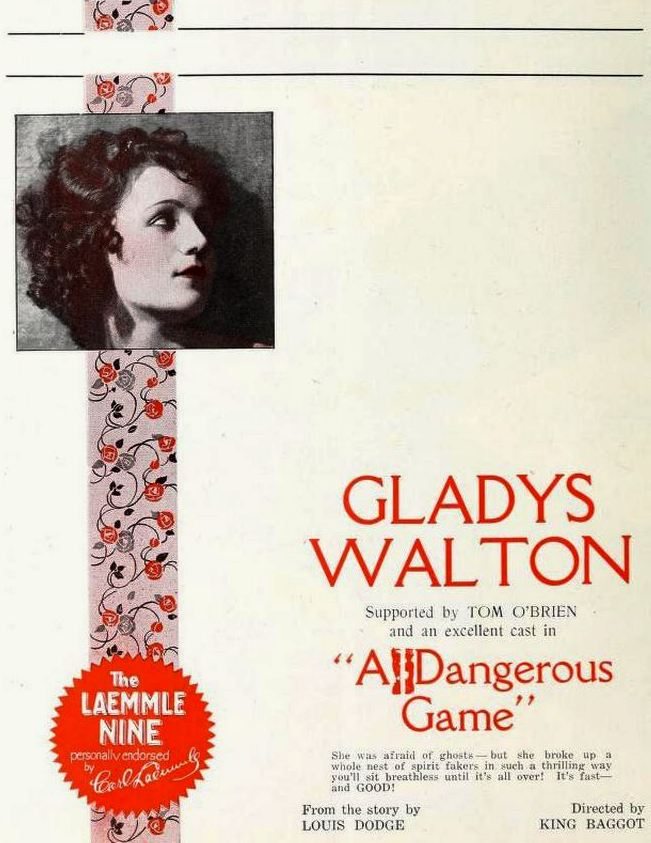
- Directed by: King Baggot
- Written by: Hugh Hoffman
- Produced by: Carl Laemmle
- Starring: Gladys Walton; Spottiswoode Aitken; Otto Hoffman
- Cinematography: Victor Milner
- Production company: Universal Pictures
- Distributed by: Universal Pictures
- Release date: December 17, 1922
- Running time: 50 minutes
- Country: United States
- Languages: Silent; English intertitles

A Dangerous Game is a 1922 American silent drama film directed by King Baggot and starring Gladys Walton, Spottiswoode Aitken and Otto Hoffman.

== Cast ==
- Gladys Walton as Gretchen Ann Peebles
- Spottiswoode Aitken as Edward Peebles
- Otto Hoffman as Uncle Stillson Peebles
- Rosa Gore as Aunt Constance
- William Robert Daly as Bill Kelley
- Kate Price as Mrs. Kelley
- Robert Agnew as John Kelley
- Edward Jobson as Pete Sebastian
- Anne Schaefer as Stella Sebastian
- Christine Mayo as Madame Gaunt
- Harry Carter as Her Manager
- Bill Gibbs as Butler

== Bibliography ==
- Munden, Kenneth White. The American Film Institute Catalog of Motion Pictures Produced in the United States, Part 1. University of California Press, 1997.
