= The Home Maker =

1925 film

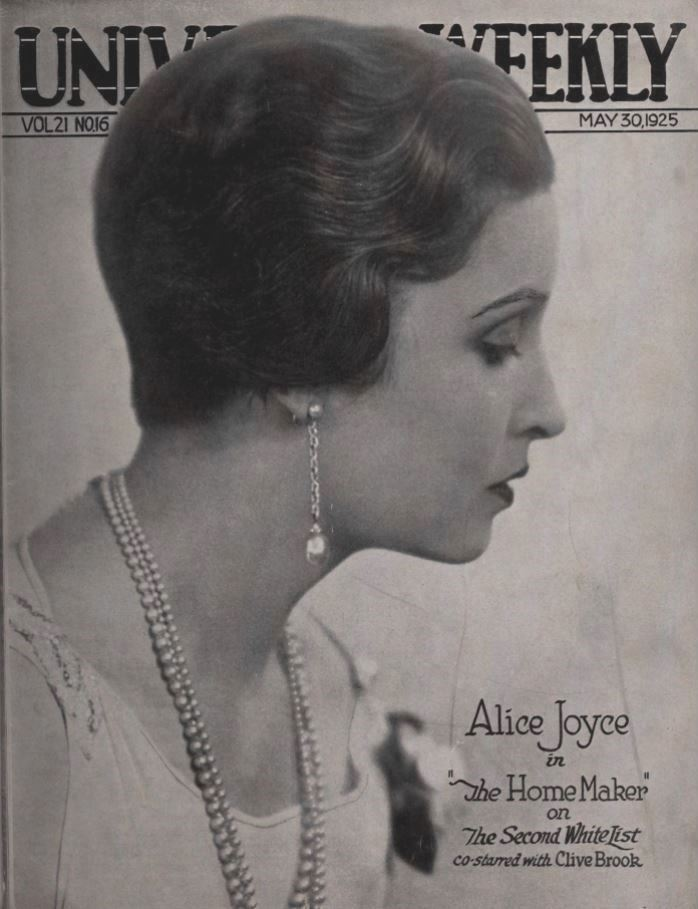
- Still on a magazine cover
- Directed by: King Baggot
- Written by: Mary O'Hara
- Based on: The Home-Maker by Dorothy Canfield
- Produced by: King Baggot
- Starring: Alice Joyce; Clive Brook; Billy Kent Schaefer
- Cinematography: John Stumar
- Production company: Universal Pictures
- Distributed by: Universal Pictures
- Release date: August 9, 1925
- Running time: 90 minutes
- Country: United States
- Language: Silent (English intertitles)

The Home Maker is a 1925 American silent drama film directed by King Baggot and starring Alice Joyce, Clive Brook, and Billy Kent Schaefer. A husband and wife are more successful once they have swapped roles.

== Plot ==
As described in a film magazine review, a man who is conscientious but inefficient in business is married to a woman who does not care for home work because she has great business ability. He attempts suicide because of his repeated failures, but injures himself by paralyzing his lower limbs and becoming an invalid. Thereafter he stays at home with the children and writes, while his wife takes a business position. Both are so happy with their changed circumstances that, when the husband discovers he can use his limbs again, he begs the family doctor not to reveal the fact, lest the happiness of the family be ruined. The doctor accedes, and the family's bliss continues.

== Cast ==
- Alice Joyce as Eva Knapp
- Clive Brook as Lester Knapp
- Billy Kent Schaefer as Stephen Knapp
- Maurice Murphy as Henry Knapp
- Julie Bishop as Helen Knapp
- Frank Newburg as Harvey Bronson
- George Fawcett as Dr. Merritt
- Margaret Campbell as Mattie Farnum
- Martha Mattox as Mrs. Anderson
- Alfred Fisher as John - the Janitor
- Alice Flower as Miss West
- Virginia True Boardman as Mrs. Prouty
- Elaine Ellis as Molly Prouty
- Mary Gordon as Mrs. Hennessy
- Lloyd Whitlock as Mr. Willings

== Preservation status ==
A print of The Home Maker is preserved in the UCLA Film and Television Archive.

== Bibliography ==
- Richard Koszarski. An Evening's Entertainment: The Age of the Silent Feature Picture, 1915-1928. University of California Press, 1994. ISBN 0-6841-8415-X
