= His Last Dollar =

- Directed by: Frank Powell
- Screenplay by: David Higgins
- Produced by: Daniel Frohman
- Starring: David Higgins; Betty Gray; Hal Clarendon; Edgar L. Davenport; Wellington A. Playter; Jack Pickford
- Production company: Famous Players Film Company
- Distributed by: Paramount Pictures
- Release date: October 29, 1914
- Running time: 50 minutes
- Country: United States
- Language: English

His Last Dollar is a lost 1914 American comedy silent film directed by Frank Powell and written by David Higgins. The film stars David Higgins, Betty Gray, Hal Clarendon, Edgar L. Davenport, Wellington A. Playter and Jack Pickford. The film was released on October 29, 1914, by Paramount Pictures.

== Cast ==
- David Higgins as Joe Braxton
- Betty Gray as Eleanor Downs
- Hal Clarendon as Linson
- Edgar L. Davenport as Colonel Downs
- Wellington A. Playter as Broker
- Jack Pickford as Jockey Jones
- Nat G. Deverich as Jockey Ross
