= Jealousy (1912 film) =

- Produced by: Reliance Film Company
- Starring: Henry B. Walthall; Jane Fearnley
- Distributed by: Motion Picture Distributors and Sales Company
- Release date: March 23, 1912
- Running time: 1 reel
- Country: United States
- Language: Silent

Jealousy is a 1912 silent short film starring Henry B. Walthall and Gertrude Robinson. It was produced by the Reliance Film Company. The plot involves a wife that tries to calm her jealous husband after he comes home unexpectedly, when she was playing a prank that went wrong. The film is preserved in the Library of Congress collection.

== Cast ==
- Henry B. Walthall, as the husband
- Jane Fearnley, as May Berry, the wife
- Gertrude Robinson, as the wife's friend and masquerader
