= The Dream (1911 film) =

1911 American short film

- Directed by: Thomas H. Ince; George Loane Tucker
- Written by: Herbert Brenon (scenario)
- Produced by: Carl Laemmle
- Starring: Mary Pickford; Owen Moore
- Music by: Ernesto Nazareth
- Distributed by: Motion Picture Distributors and Sales Company
- Release date: January 23, 1911
- Running time: 1 reel (10 minutes)
- Country: United States
- Language: Silent (English intertitles)

The Dream is a 1911 American one-reel film produced and released by the Independent Moving Pictures Company (IMP) and directed by Thomas H. Ince and George Loane Tucker. It starred Mary Pickford and her husband Owen Moore after they left the Biograph Company. This film is preserved at the Library of Congress, a rare survivor from Pickford's IMP period. It appears on the Milestone Films DVD of Pickford's 1918 feature Amarilly of Clothes-Line Alley.

== Plot ==
A husband dines with another woman at a restaurant, finishing a bottle of wine, while his dejected wife waits at home at the dining table, occasionally nodding off and checking the clock. At the restaurant, the husband pays with a large roll of bills. The other woman playfully kicks his hat from his hands as they leave.

Later, the husband arrives home to find his wife still waiting. He rebuffs her attempt to help with his hat and ignores her gesture toward the untouched dinner. He knocks over dishes and a chair before collapsing on the sofa with a cigarette. The wife, upset, leaves the room.

The husband falls asleep and dreams that his wife returns wearing a form-fitting dress and plumed hat. She wakes him, drinks wine from the sideboard, tosses the glass to the floor, drop-kicks a plate, lights a cigarette, and blows smoke in his face. She pelts him with a pillow, grabs her coat, pulls down the door curtains, and blows him a kiss goodbye. A well-dressed gentleman waits outside, and they leave together.

The bewildered husband follows them to the same restaurant where he had dined earlier. He considers confronting them but flees instead. At home, he rants wildly and writes a letter saying, "You're not the woman I supposed you were." He retrieves a revolver from the sideboard drawer, points it at his abdomen, pulls the trigger, and collapses.

The husband awakens, falling off the sofa and clutching his stomach. His wife enters in her modest clothing and startles him. He recounts his vivid dream while she comforts him. As she prepares dessert, he pulls out his address book and shreds it. Reconciled, they embrace and sit down to eat together.

== Cast ==
- Mary Pickford as Nell Herbert
- Owen Moore as Will Herbert
- William Robert Daly
- Charles Arling
- Lottie Pickford as Bess
