= Ivanhoe (1913 American film) =

1913 film by Herbert Brenon

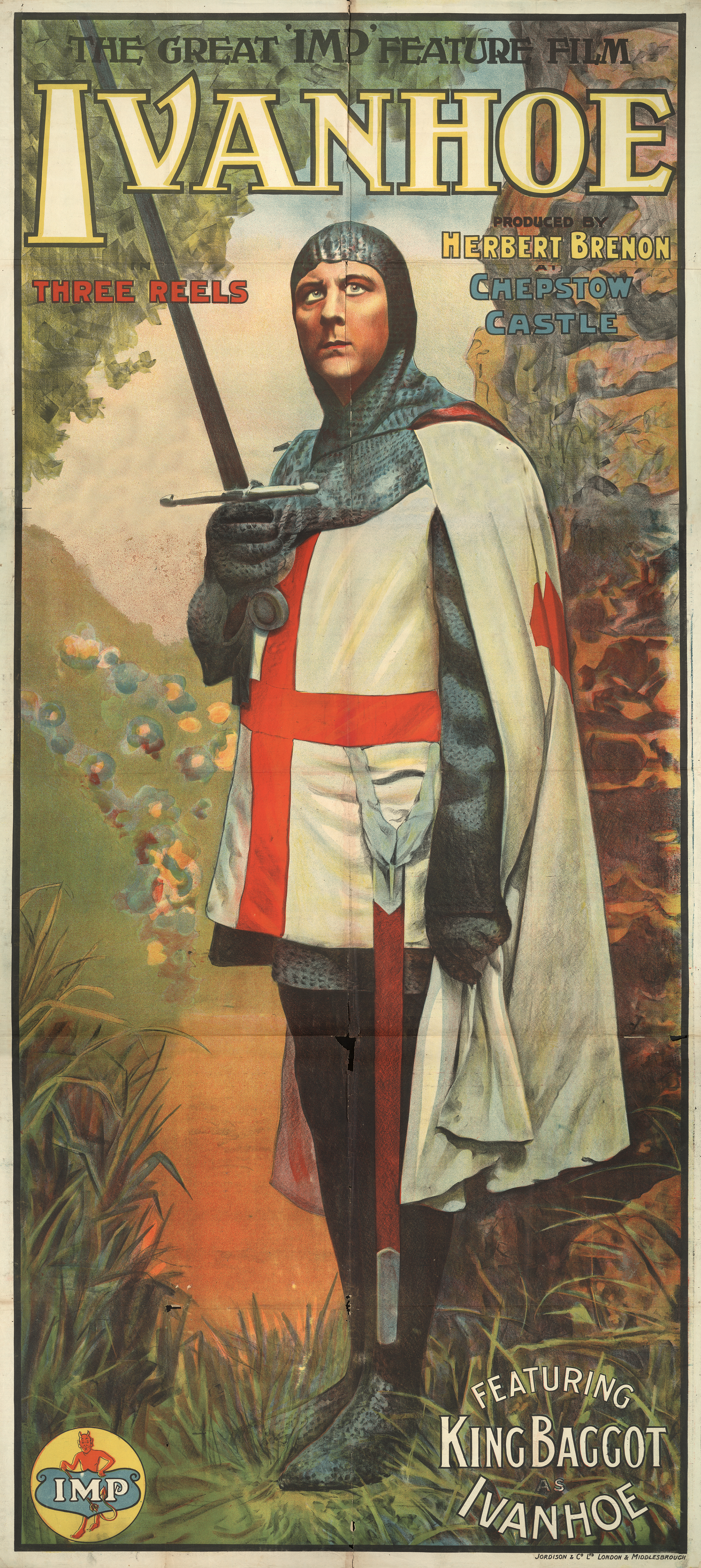
- Theatrical release poster
- Directed by: Herbert Brenon
- Written by: Herbert Brenon
- Based on: Ivanhoe; 1819 novel by Sir Walter Scott
- Produced by: Herbert Brenon; Carl Laemmle
- Starring: King Baggot
- Production company: Independent Moving Pictures
- Distributed by: Universal Film Manufacturing Company
- Release date: September 22, 1913
- Running time: 48 minutes (4 reels)
- Country: United States
- Languages: Silent; English intertitles

Ivanhoe is a 1913 American silent adventure/drama film starring King Baggot, Leah Baird, Herbert Brenon, Evelyn Hope, and Walter Craven.

Directed by Herbert Brenon and produced by Carl Laemmle's Independent Moving Pictures after IMP was absorbed into the newly founded Universal, which was the distributor, the screenplay was adapted by Brenon based on the epic 1819 historical novel of the same title by Sir Walter Scott.

One of the first expeditions abroad, Ivanhoe was filmed on location in the United Kingdom.

A copy of this early feature length production is preserved at the Museum of Modern Art in Midtown Manhattan, New York City.

== Plot ==
Ivanhoe (1913, Dutch intertitles)

Set in late 12th century England, this silent adventure is filled with pageantry and excitement as it chronicles the star-crossed love between a dashing knight and a beautiful Jewish maiden.

Wilfred of Ivanhoe, son of Sir Cedric, returns to England from the Crusades in the Holy Land. As Ivanhoe, disguised, discovers that his beloved Lady Rowena has remained faithful, two weary travelers, Isaac of York and his pretty daughter Rebecca, are admitted to Sir Cedric's castle, but after the knights learn that Isaac has money they abduct the visitors to the Norman stronghold of Torquilstone Castle.

When Ivanhoe realizes that Sir Cedric and Rowena have also been captured, he enters the forest, where he meets Robin Hood and the Black Knight, actually King Richard, the Lion-Hearted. Their band defeats de Bois in battle, but the villain escapes with Rebecca, later charging her with sorcery.

As Ivanhoe defeats de Bois in single combat, King Richard arrives, revealing his identity and reclaiming the crown from his traitorous brother, Prince John.

Sadly, Rebecca must undergo a period of suffering, as well as come to terms with the loss of the man she loves, and witness the nuptials of her gallant Ivanhoe and the beautiful Rowena.

== Cast ==
- King Baggot as Wilfred of Ivanhoe
- Leah Baird as Rebecca of York
- Herbert Brenon as Isaac of York
- Evelyn Hope as Lady Rowena
- Walter Craven as Richard, the Lion-Hearted
- Wallace Widdicombe as Sir Brian de Bois - Guilbert
- Walter Thomas as Robin Hood
- Wallace Bosco as Sir Cedric, Ivanhoe's Father
- Helen Downing as Elgitha
- Jack Bates as Reginald Front-de Boeuf
- R. Hollies as Friar Tuck
- George Courtenay as Prince John
- William Calvert as Gurth
- A. J. Charlwood as Athelstane
- Maurice Norman as Wamba, the Jester

== Filming ==
Filming was undertaken in and around Chepstow Castle in Monmouthshire, in June and July 1913. It was said at the time to be "the biggest venture of the kind ever attempted in England" [sic]. Many of the residents of Chepstow were accustomed to wearing costume as participants in local historical reenactments, and rates of payment for extras were higher than earnings at the local shipyard. It was reported that, for three or four weeks during filming, residents of the town went about their daily work in costume, and the town took on "a state of festival and fancy raiment". Several local residents were injured during the filming. The film was released in September 1913, and was shown four times a day in the local picture hall.
