= Pictureland =

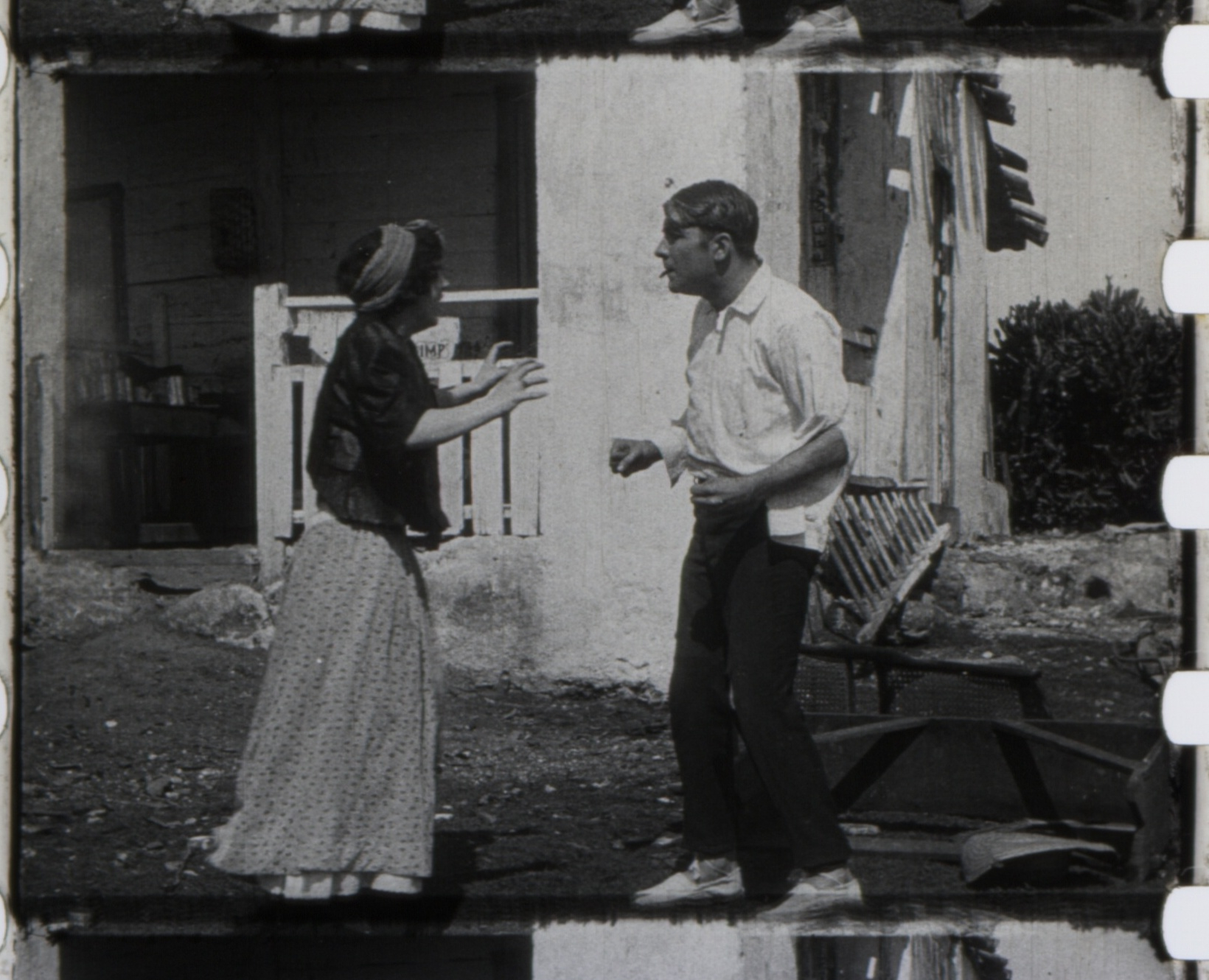
- Frame from the rediscovered version of the film
- Directed by: Thomas H. Ince
- Produced by: Carl Laemmle
- Starring: Isabel Rea; King Baggot
- Cinematography: Tony Gaudio
- Production company: Independent Moving Pictures
- Distributed by: Motion Picture Distributors and Sales Company
- Release date: February 20, 1911
- Running time: 10 min.
- Country: United States
- Languages: Silent film English intertitles

Pictureland is a 1911 American silent short romance film starring Isabel Rea and King Baggot, released by Independent Moving Pictures (IMP), and possibly directed by Thomas H. Ince.

The film was made on location in Cuba.

== Plot ==
Americans arrive at their hotel in Cuba in a car, to make a movie. Romantic complications ensue while the cast and crew attempt to finish the movie.

== Cast ==
- Isabel Rea as Rosita
- King Baggot as Pablo

== Preservation status ==
Previously thought to be a lost film, the film was rediscovered by a researcher, Robert Hoskin, in Australia who received a print from Japan.

== See also ==
- List of rediscovered films
