= The Eternal Sin =

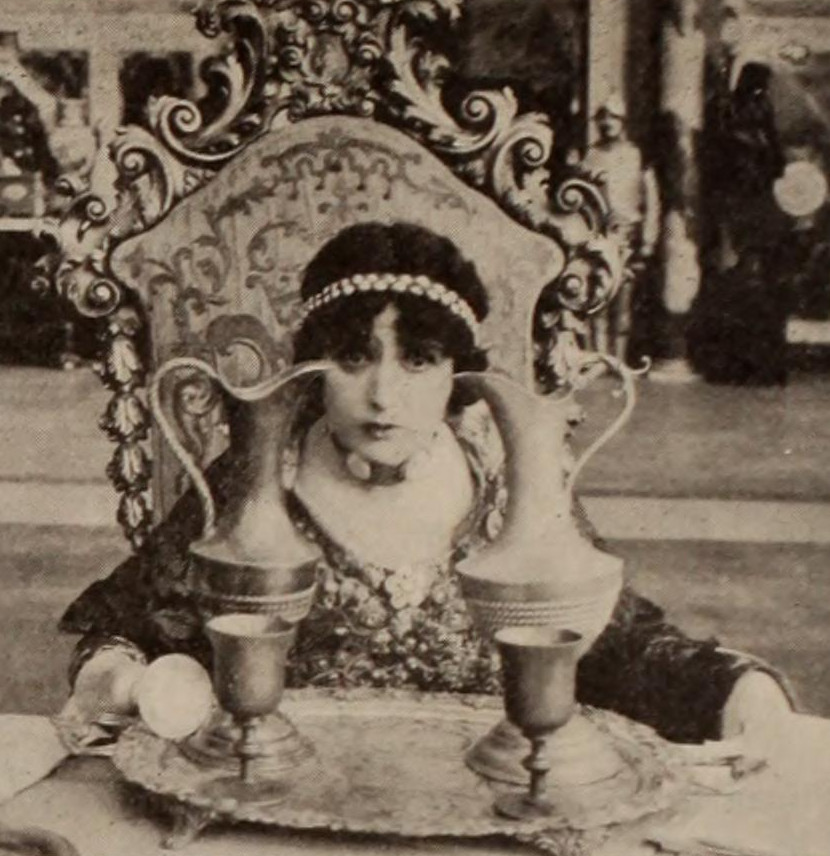
- Scene from the film
- Directed by: Herbert Brenon
- Written by: George Edwards Hall; Herbert Brenon
- Based on: novel, Lucretia Borgia, by Victor Hugo
- Produced by: Herbert Brenon Film Corp.
- Starring: Florence Reed
- Cinematography: J. Roy Hunt; David Calcagni
- Edited by: James C. McKay
- Distributed by: Lewis J. Selznick; Selznick Pictures
- Release date: March 17, 1917
- Running time: 6 reels
- Country: USA
- Language: Silent..English intertitles

The Eternal Sin is a lost 1917 American silent historical drama film directed by Herbert Brenon and starring Florence Reed. Brenon produced and Lewis J. Selznick handled the distribution.

== Cast ==
- Florence Reed - Lucretia Borgia
- William E. Shay - The Duke of Ferrara
- Stephen Grattan - Her Brother
- Richard Barthelmess - Gennaro
- Alexander Shannon - Rustighello
- A. G. Parker - Maffio
- M. J. Briggs - Astolpo
- Edward Thorne - Jeppo
- Elmer Patterson - Liveretto
- Anthony Merlo - Petrucci
- Henry Armetta - The Jester
- William Welsh - Gubetta
- Juliet Brenon - Blanca
- Jane Fearnley - Princess Negroni
- Henrietta Gilbert - Flametta
