= The Gaiety Girl (film) =

1924 film by King Baggot

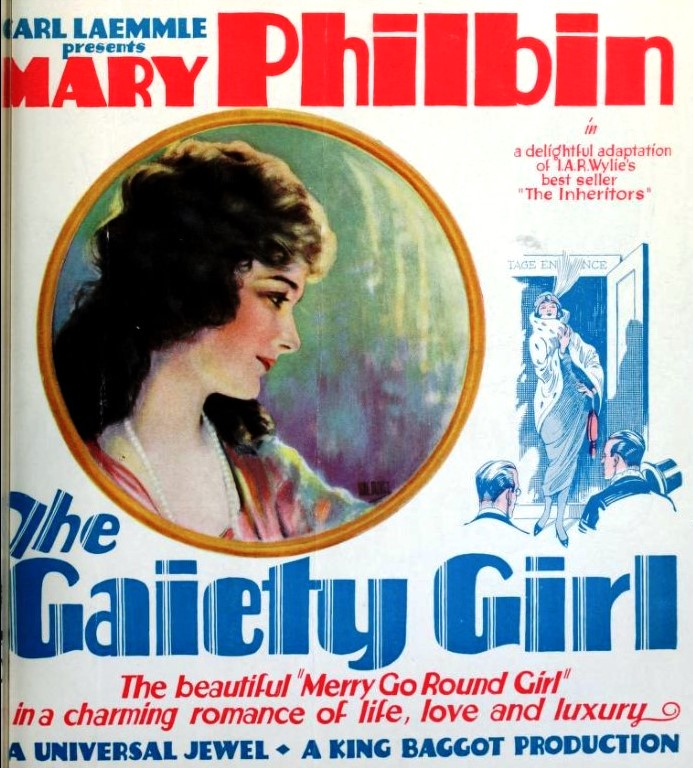
- Advertisement
- Directed by: King Baggot
- Written by: Frank S. Beresford; Melville W. Brown; Bernard McConville
- Based on: "The Inheritors" by I. A. R. Wylie
- Starring: Mary Philbin; Joseph J. Dowling; William Haines
- Cinematography: Charles J. Stumar
- Music by: Sidney Jones
- Distributed by: Universal Pictures
- Release date: July 31, 1924
- Running time: 1 hr. 20 min.
- Country: United States
- Language: Silent (English intertitles)

The Gaiety Girl is a 1924 American silent romantic film directed by King Baggot and starring Mary Philbin.

== Plot ==
William Tudor has a huge debt and is forced to give up his family castle. He sells it to war millionaire John Kershaw and goes to London to visit his granddaughter Irene. Meanwhile, Tudor's nephew and Irene's sweetheart Owen travels to South Africa to oversee his father's mines. Irene becomes a chorus girl at the Gaiety Theatre. Here, John's son Christopher Kershaw falls in love with her. She does not want to have anything to do with him, but becomes desperate after her father gets ill. She gets the message Owen has been killed in the war and agrees to marry Christopher. Right after the marriage, an alive Owen shows up at the castle. Meanwhile, a huge chandelier crashes down on Christopher's head. He is now killed, which makes Irene and Owen able to reunite. Owen buys the castle back from John and Irene's grandfather comes back to his home.

== Cast ==
- Mary Philbin as Irene Tudor
- Joseph J. Dowling as William Tudor
- William Haines as Owen Tudor St. John
- Freeman Wood as Christopher 'Kit' Kershaw
- DeWitt Jennings as John Kershaw
- James O. Barrows as Juckins
- Otto Hoffman as Evan Evans
- Grace Darmond as Pansy Gale
- Tom Ricketts as His Grace, the Duke (credited as Thomas Ricketts)
- William H. Turner as Tracy Andrews (credited as William Turner)
- Duke R. Lee as Archer Smythe
- George B. Williams as Sammy Samuels
- Roy Laidlaw as Rayburn (Stage Manager)

== Preservation ==
With no prints of The Gaiety Girl located in any film archives, it is a lost film.
