= Billy's Adventure =

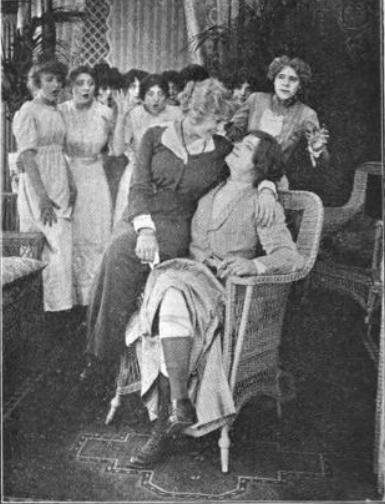
- Produced by: Gem Motion Picture Company
- Starring: Billy Quirk; Violet Horner
- Distributed by: Universal Film Manufacturing Company
- Release date: May 13, 1913
- Running time: 965 ft
- Country: United States
- Languages: Silent; English intertitles

Billy's Adventure is a single-reel American silent comedy film released in 1915 It was one of the last in a series of films made by actors Billy Quirk and Violet Horner for the Gem Motion Picture Company.

== Plot ==
The titular character disguises himself as a pupil at a girls' boarding school, and later a prince, to win his future father-in-law's approval.

== Release ==
Billy's Adventure was released on May 13, 1913, in the United States, and in England on September 8, 1913.
