= Their First Misunderstanding =

1911 film

- Directed by: Thomas H. Ince; George Loane Tucker
- Written by: George Loane Tucker
- Produced by: Carl Laemmle
- Starring: Mary Pickford
- Cinematography: Tony Gaudio
- Production company: Independent Moving Pictures
- Distributed by: Motion Picture Distributing and Sales Company
- Release date: January 9, 1911
- Running time: 10 minutes (one reel; 304 meters)
- Country: United States
- Language: Silent (English intertitles)

Their First Misunderstanding is a 1911 American short silent drama film directed by Thomas H. Ince and George Loane Tucker and starring Mary Pickford and Owen Moore. Pickford and Moore married on January 7, 1911.

== Cast ==
- Mary Pickford as Mae Darcy
- Owen Moore as Tom Owen
- Thomas H. Ince in crowd at train station
- Ben Turpin in crowd at train station

== Preservation status ==
Their First Misunderstanding was believed to be a lost film until a copy was discovered in a barn in New Hampshire in 2006. The film is intact, apart from the first minute, which had disintegrated over time. The remaining footage was restored and is currently preserved at the Library of Congress and the Keene State College Film Society.

== See also ==
- Mary Pickford filmography
- Thomas H. Ince filmography
- List of incomplete or partially lost films
- List of rediscovered films
