= Hiawatha (1909 film) =

1909 American silent short film

- Directed by: William V. Ranous
- Written by: Based on The Song of Hiawatha by Henry Wadsworth Longfellow
- Produced by: Carl Laemmle
- Starring: Gladys Hulette, William V. Ranous
- Production company: Independent Moving Pictures (IMP)
- Distributed by: IMP
- Release date: October 25, 1909
- Running time: 15 minutes
- Country: United States
- Language: Silent film

Hiawatha is a 1909 American silent short film directed by William V. Ranous and produced by Carl Laemmle's Independent Moving Pictures Company (IMP). It is based on the 1855 epic poem The Song of Hiawatha by Henry Wadsworth Longfellow. The film is historically significant for being the first production of IMP, the company that later became Universal Pictures.

== Plot ==
The film presents a dramatization of Longfellow's poem, focusing on the Native American hero Hiawatha and his romance with Minnehaha. It uses traditional elements of Native American mythology and literary romanticism, combining location photography and tableau-style acting typical of early cinema.

== Production ==
Hiawatha was produced by Carl Laemmle in 1909 and is widely regarded as IMP's debut release. It starred a young Gladys Hulette as Minnehaha and William V. Ranous as Hiawatha. The film was reportedly shot near Fort Lee, New Jersey, with some scenes possibly filmed at a waterfall in Passaic, New Jersey, or using stock footage.

== Historical significance ==
Hiawatha is considered a landmark in film history as the first release from the Independent Moving Pictures Company, marking Carl Laemmle's entry into motion picture production. Laemmle promoted the film as the beginning of a "brand new era in American motion pictures." Film scholar Tom Gunning notes that Hiawatha demonstrates early attempts to blend literary prestige with the popular "Indian drama" genre common at the time.

== Reception ==
The film was praised in the trade press. The Moving Picture World called it "a pictorial rendition of Longfellow’s great poem" that contributed "something worthwhile… to the beauty and attractiveness of the motion picture world."

== Preservation ==
A print of the 1909 version of Hiawatha is preserved by the UCLA Film and Television Archive, which holds a 35mm nitrate positive and safety copies. The Library of Congress holds a 35mm print of the 1913 version.

== Confusion with 1913 film ==
A longer, four-reel adaptation of Hiawatha was released in 1913, directed by Edgar Lewis and starring Seneca actor Jesse Cornplanter as Hiawatha. That version is sometimes confused with the 1909 IMP film but is a separate production entirely.

== Legacy ==
Hiawatha (1909) is frequently cited in film histories for its role in launching IMP and its early use of a literary source. It represents the transition from short actuality films to narrative storytelling and demonstrates Laemmle's early marketing strategy outside the Edison Trust.

== See also ==
- List of American films of 1909
- Independent Moving Pictures
- Carl Laemmle
- The Song of Hiawatha

== Sources ==
- "Hiawatha". AFI Catalog.
- Aleiss, Angela (March 25, 2015). "What Was the First Feature Film With an All-Native Cast?". ICT News.
- Gunning, Tom (n.d.). "Hiawatha". Il Cinema Ritrovato.
- "Hiawatha (1909)". SilentEra. January 29, 2025.
