= Crossed Wires =

1923 film

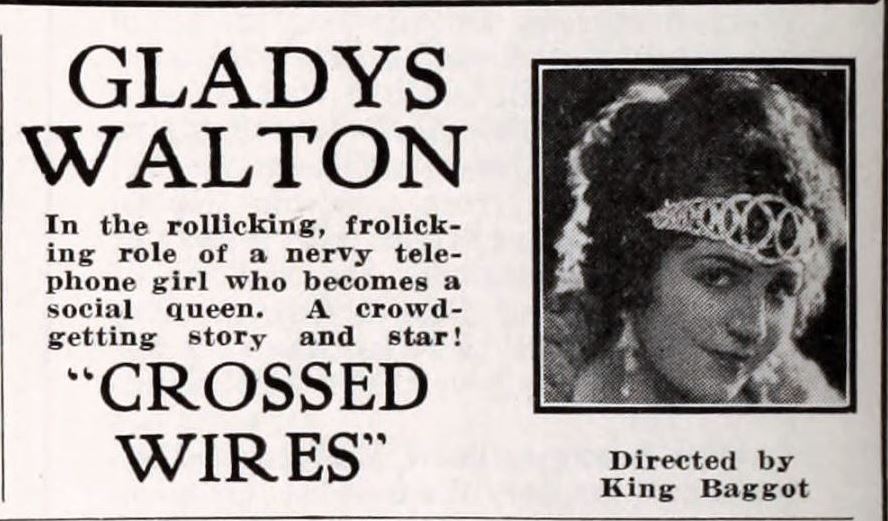
- Advertisement
- Directed by: King Baggot
- Screenplay by: Hugh Hoffman
- Story by: King Baggot; Raymond L. Schrock
- Starring: Gladys Walton; George Stewart; Tom Guise; Lillian Langdon; William Robert Daly; Kate Price
- Cinematography: Benjamin H. Kline
- Production company: Universal Pictures
- Distributed by: Universal Pictures
- Release date: May 14, 1923
- Running time: 50 minutes
- Country: United States
- Language: Silent (English intertitles)

Crossed Wires is a 1923 American comedy film directed by King Baggot and written by Hugh Hoffman. The film stars Gladys Walton, George Stewart, Tom Guise, Lillian Langdon, William Robert Daly, and Kate Price. The film was released on May 14, 1923, by Universal Pictures.

== Cast ==
- Gladys Walton as Marcel Murphy
- George Stewart as Ralph Benson
- Tom Guise as Bellamy Benson
- Lillian Langdon as Mrs. Margaret Benson
- William Robert Daly as Pat Murphy
- Kate Price as Nora Murphy
- Eddie Gribbon as Tim Flanagan
- Marie Crisp as Madalyn Van Ralston Kemp
- Eloise Nesbit as Annie
- Helen Broneau as Fannie
- Lewis Mason as Cyril Gordon
