= Police Court (film) =

1932 film

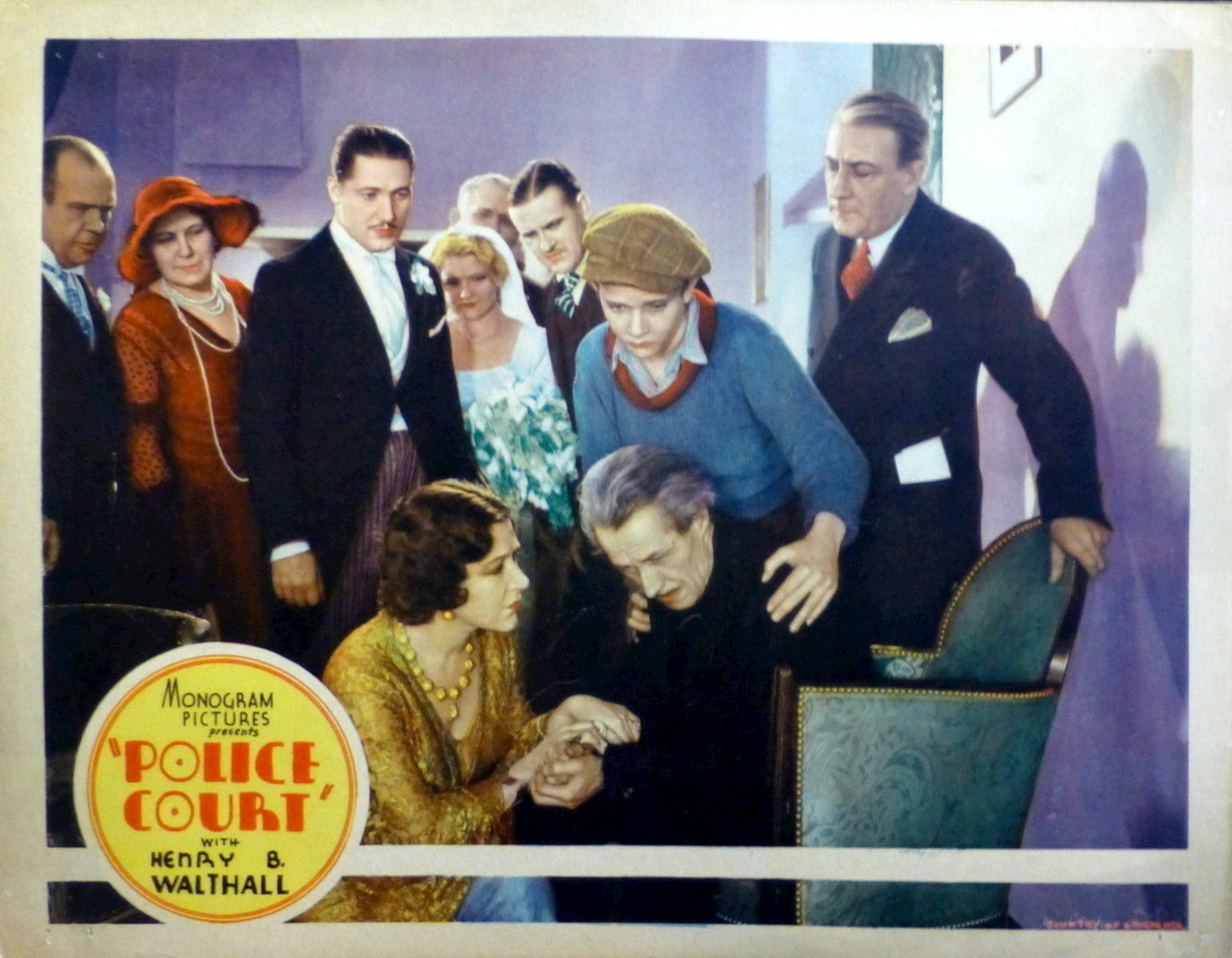
- Lobby card
- Directed by: Louis King
- Written by: Stuart Anthony (story and screenplay)
- Produced by: I. E. Chadwick
- Starring: Henry B. Walthall; Leon Janney; Lionel Belmore; King Baggot
- Cinematography: Archie Stout
- Edited by: Charles J. Hunt
- Production company: Chadwick Pictures
- Distributed by: Monogram Pictures
- Release date: February 20, 1932
- Running time: 63 minutes
- Country: United States
- Language: English

Police Court is a 1932 American pre-Code drama film starring Henry B. Walthall, Leon Janney, Lionel Belmore, and King Baggot. Directed by Louis King and released by Monogram Pictures, the screenplay was adapted by Stuart Anthony from his story. Police Court features an all-star cast from the silent film era.

== Plot ==
A once popular actor, Nat Barry, is a has-been because of his alcoholism. The legendary film star is forced by necessity to take a job selling patent medicine at a traveling sideshow dressed in a costume as Abraham Lincoln. Having trouble staying sober, he is arrested and taken before a "police court" for drunken disorder. His teenage son, Junior Barry, pleads on Barry's behalf and Judge Robert Webster grants him a reprieve.

Junior is determined to see his father make good again, vowing to keep him off the bottle and on the screen. He attempts to get bit parts for Barry, but he has trouble delivering his lines on the movie set for the compassionate director, Henry Field.

== Cast ==
- Henry B. Walthall as Nat Barry
- Leon Janney as Junior Barry
- Lionel Belmore as Uncle Al Furman
- King Baggot as Henry Field, movie director
- Al St. John as Skid
- Edmund Breese as Judge Robert Webster
- Aileen Pringle as Diana McCormick
- Walter James as Cappy Hearn
- Al Bridge (credited as Alan Bridge)
- Bud Osborne
- Paul Panzer as movie actor
- Natalie Joyce as actress
- Jack Richardson
- Fred Toones as Snowflake (credited as Fred Toones)
