= The Conspiracy (1914 film) =

1914 film by Allan Dwan

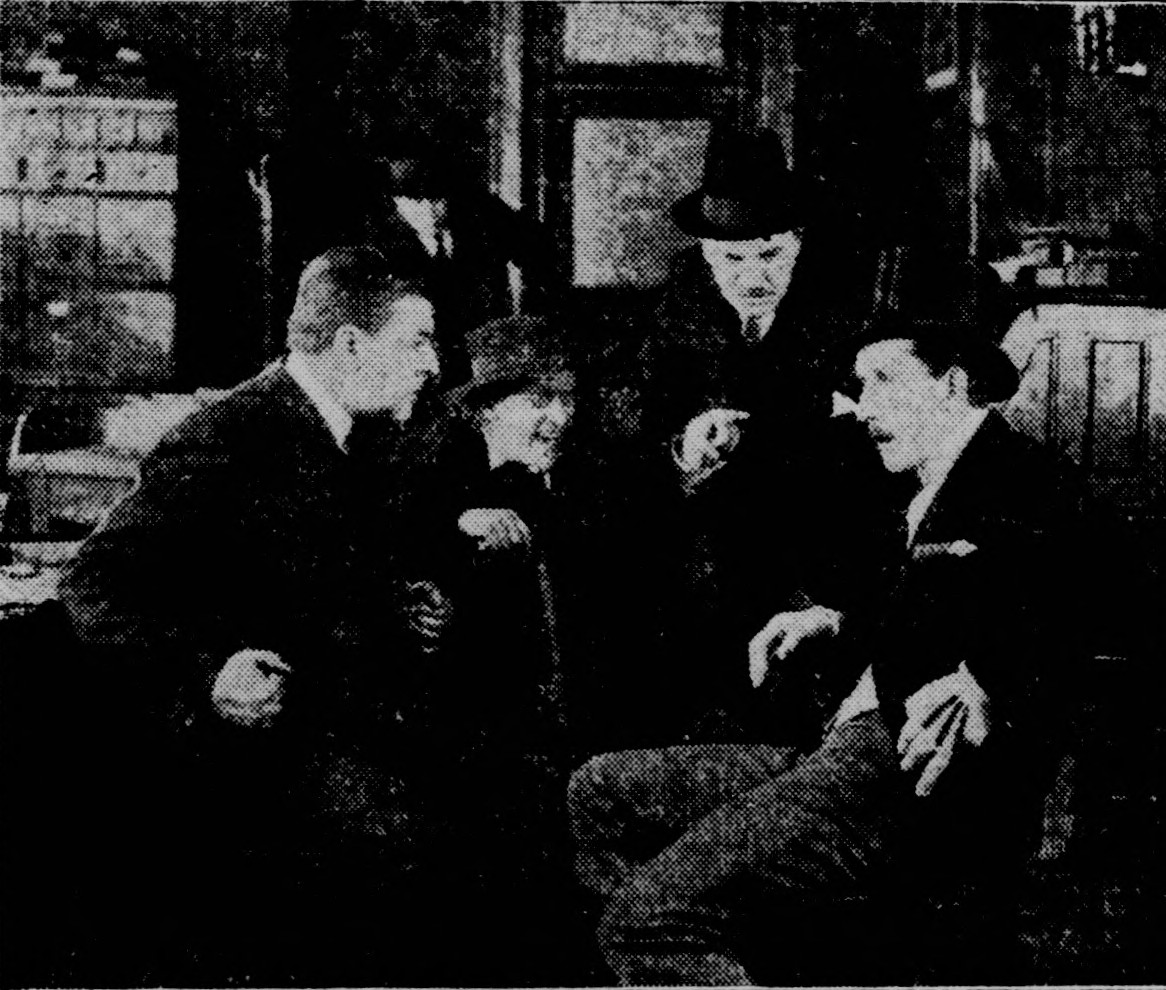
- Scene from the film
- Directed by: Allan Dwan
- Screenplay by: Robert B. Baker (play); John Emerson (play)
- Produced by: Charles Frohman
- Starring: Lois Meredith; Harold Lockwood; Iva Shepard; Francis Byrne; Hal Clarendon
- Cinematography: H. Lyman Broening
- Production company: Famous Players Film Company
- Distributed by: Paramount Pictures
- Release date: December 10, 1914
- Country: United States
- Language: English

The Conspiracy is a 1914 American drama silent film directed by Allan Dwan and adapted from the Robert M. Baker and John Emerson play of the same name. The film stars John Emerson, Lois Meredith, Harold Lockwood, Iva Shepard, Francis Byrne and Hal Clarendon. The film was released on December 10, 1914, by Paramount Pictures.

== Plot ==
Winthrop Clavering a mystery writer, solves a case.

== Cast ==
- John Emerson as Winthrop Clavering
- Lois Meredith as Margaret Holt
- Harold Lockwood as Jack Howell
- Iva Shepard as Juanita
- Francis Byrne as Victor Holt
- Hal Clarendon as Morton
- Dodson Mitchell as Bill Flynn
- Edouard Durand as Savelli
