= Action (1921 film) =

1921 film directed by John Ford

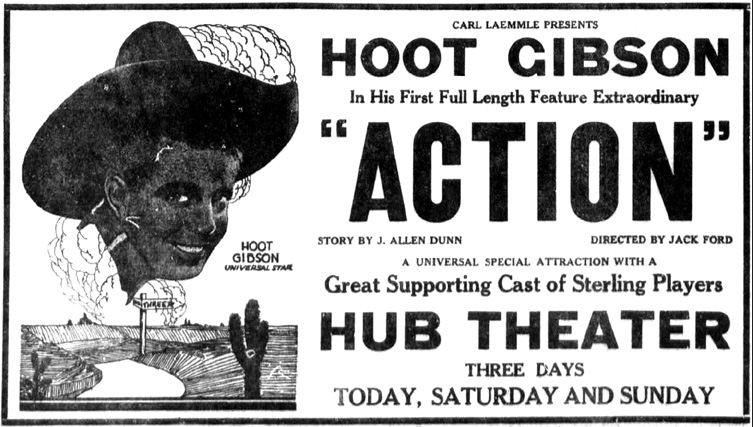
- Promotion for film in the Casper Daily Tribune (Wyoming), 1921
- Directed by: John Ford
- Screenplay by: Harvey Gates; Peter B. Kyne
- Based on: The Mascotte of the Three Star in Short Stories 1921 by J. Allan Dunn
- Starring: Hoot Gibson
- Cinematography: John W. Brown
- Distributed by: Universal Film Manufacturing Company
- Release date: September 12, 1921
- Running time: 50 minutes
- Country: United States
- Languages: Silent; English intertitles

Action is a lost 1921 American silent Western film directed by John Ford and featuring Hoot Gibson. According to contemporaneous newspaper reports, Action was based on J. Allan Dunn's novel, The Mascotte of the Three Star; Mascotte appeared as the lead novel in the pulp magazine Short Stories, February 1921.

== Cast ==
- Hoot Gibson as Sandy Brouke
- Francis Ford as Soda Water Manning
- J. Farrell MacDonald as Mormon Peters
- Buck Connors as Pat Casey
- Clara Horton as Molly Casey
- William Robert Daly as J. Plimsoll
- Dorothea Wolbert as Mirandy Meekin
- Byron Munson as Henry Meekin
- Charles Newton as Sheriff Dipple
- Jim Corey as Sam Waters

== Preservation ==
With no holdings located in archives, Action is considered a lost film.

== See also ==
- List of lost films
