= Gem Motion Picture Company =

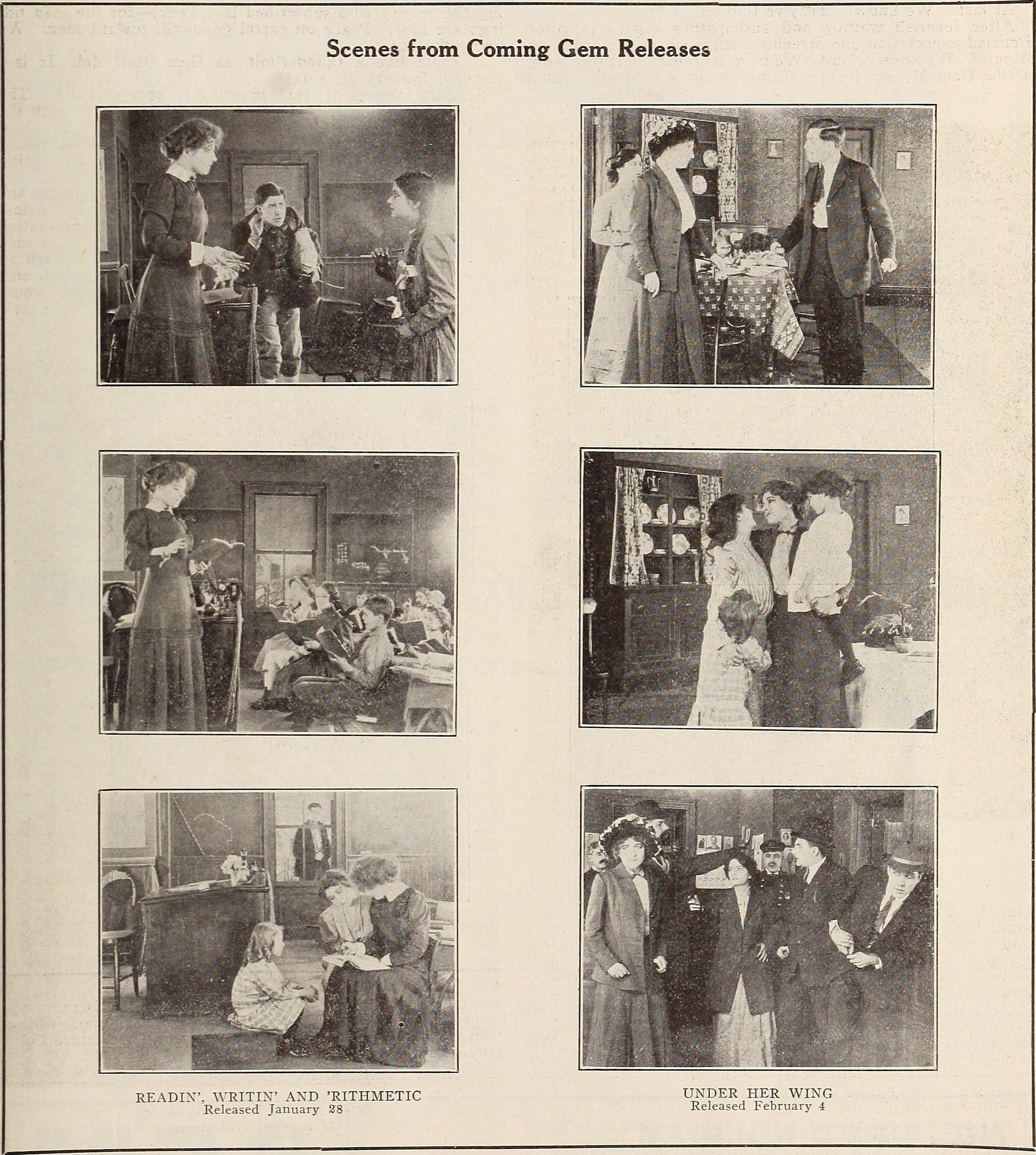
Motion Picture News page with images from Gem Motion Picture Company films

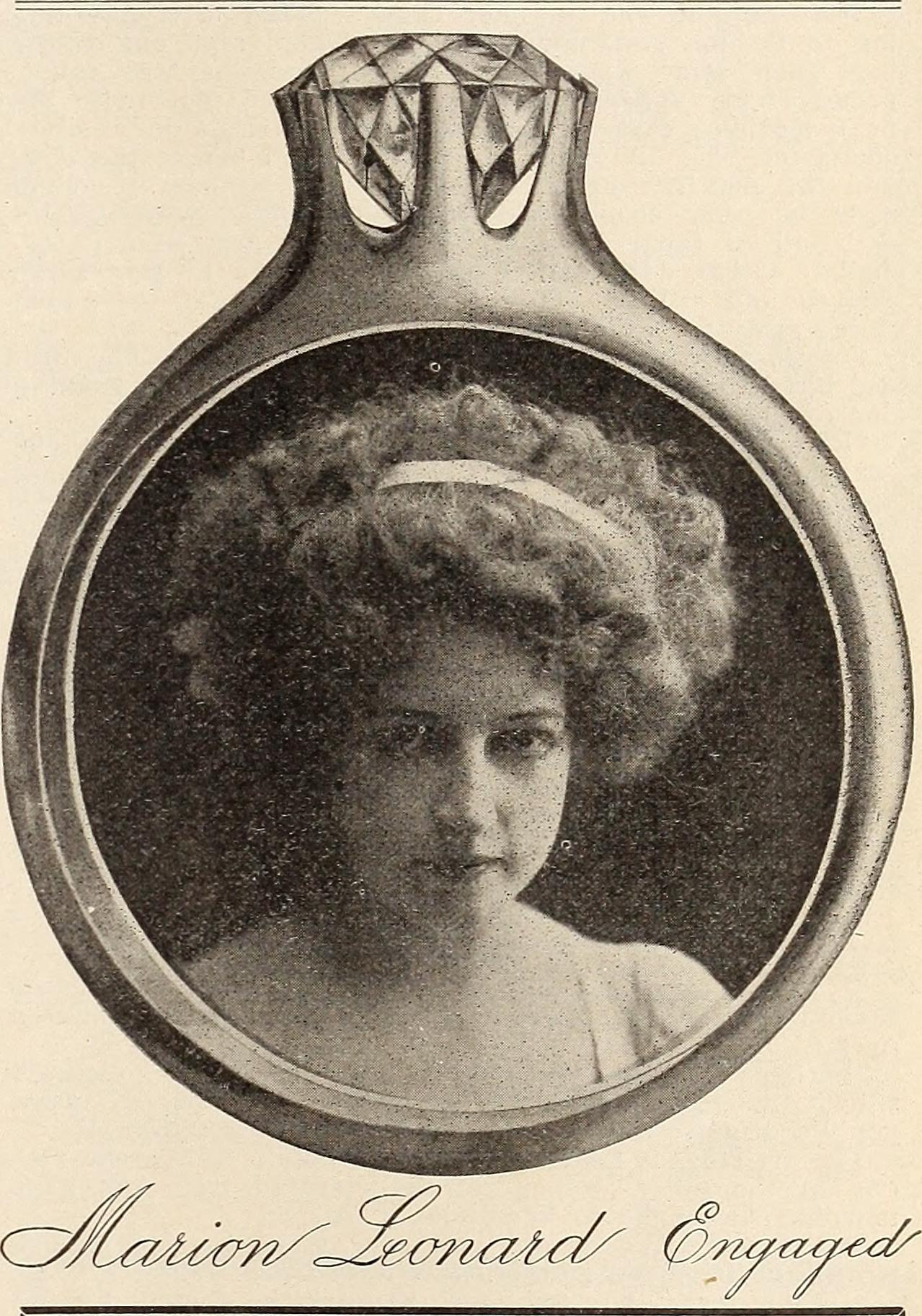
Marion Leonard engagement illustration from 1911 published in Motion Picture News

Gem Motion Picture Company was an American silent-era film studio. It was co-founded by filmmaker Stanner E.V. Taylor and his wife, actress Marion Leonard in 1911. After management issues, the company evolved to primarily act as a producer of short comedies starring Billy Quirk.

== Distribution ==
Gem film properties produced by Taylor and Leonard were sold to the Rex Motion Picture Company, which released them in 1912 under their own banner. The company's films were released by Universal in 1913.

== Partial filmography ==
- The Defender of the Name (1912)
- Under Her Wing (1912)
- White Dove's Sacrifice (1912)
- Absinthe (1913)
- Against the Law (1913)
- Call Him Whiskers (1913)
- Burglarizing Billy (1913)
- Billy Gets Arrested (1913)
- Billy in Armor (1913)
- Billy's First Quarrel (1913)
- Billy's Adventure (1913)
