= Dorothea Deakin =

English writer (1876–1924)

Deakin's book of short stories, 'Georgie'.

Dorothea Deakin (1876–1924) was an English writer of short stories, plays, and village life novels.

== Early life ==
She was the daughter of Saretta, the sister of children's writer E. Nesbit. After Saretta's death in 1899, Nesbit 'treated Dorothea like a third daughter,' taking her on holiday with the family, and is cited as an inspiration for Dorothea's beginning to write at the age of sixteen.

== Writing ==
She and Nesbit wrote two one-act plays together, The King’s Highway and The Philandrist, or the London Fortune Teller, which were performed in 1905. Dorothea's short story The Wishing Ring was also the basis of a play by Owen Davis.

In 1906, Dorothea's book 'Georgie' was taken on by Nesbit's agent at her request.

Georgie was called by a contemporary reviewer 'Just a jolly book for an idle hour.' Deakin's books have been described unfavourably as 'fairly tedious comedies of village or country house life... The standard Deakin figure is the heroine of boyish charm whose lover calls her a "good sport" and whose mission in life is to upset the rector's wife.'

== Later life ==
In 1910 she married R.W. Reynolds, the schoolmaster of J.R.R. Tolkien. They had three daughters. In 1922 the pair moved to Capri, hoping for an improvement in Dorothea's tuberculosis. She died in 1924.

== Select works ==
- The Smile of Melinda (1903)
- The Poet and the Pierrot (1905)
- 'Georgie' (1906)
- Tormentilla (1908)
- The Young Columbine (1908)
- The Goddess Girl (1910)
