= Artful Kate =

1911 American short film

- Directed by: Thomas H. Ince
- Produced by: Carl Laemmle
- Starring: Mary Pickford; Owen Moore
- Cinematography: Tony Gaudio
- Production company: Independent Moving Pictures
- Distributed by: Independent Moving Pictures
- Release date: February 23, 1911
- Running time: 1 reel
- Country: United States
- Language: Silent (English intertitles)

Artful Kate is a 1911 American one-reel silent short film produced and released by IMP, the Independent Moving Pictures Company. It was directed by Thomas H. Ince and starred Mary Pickford and her husband Owen Moore.

This film is preserved in the Library of Congress collection and the Academy Film Archive.

== Plot ==
In February 1911, United States Navy Lieutenant Hamilton informs his girlfriend Kate Stanley that he has been assigned to the USS Florida, which is to sail to Cuba. He asks for her picture, which he places inside the cover of his pocket watch. She makes him solemnly promise not to dally with foreign temptresses.

A week later, Kate receives an invitation to a "large house party" from her uncle Manuel Jose in Havana. She is overjoyed at the thought of being reunited with Hamilton. She quickly settles in at her uncle's home before the Florida even arrives.

To test Hamilton's love for her, she borrows a maid's clothes to disguise herself as a "Spanish senorita". The lieutenant is immediately smitten. However, his first advances are rebuffed. Undaunted, he secures an introduction. He takes her for a walk, but she makes things as difficult as possible by pretending not to understand English.

When he returns to the United States, he goes to see Kate. She asks to see her picture in his watch. He makes up a story of how he lost it in the midst of fierce fighting. She has him close his eyes. When she tells him to open them, she is standing there dressed as the senorita. She orders him to leave, but finally relents, and they embrace.

== Cast ==
- Mary Pickford as Kate Stanley
- Owen Moore as Lieutenant Hamilton
- Charles Arling

== Production ==
Due to legal troubles, Carl Laemmle and IMP could not produce films in the United States at this time, so they relocated to Cuba for four months, working at the deserted Palacio del Carneado on the outskirts of Havana. Artful Kate was the second film released that was made by IMP in Cuba.
