= Sweet Memories (film) =

1911 American short film

- Directed by: Thomas H. Ince
- Written by: Thomas H. Ince
- Produced by: Carl Laemmle
- Starring: Mary Pickford; King Baggot
- Distributed by: Independent Moving Pictures (IMP)
- Release date: March 27, 1911
- Running time: 10 minutes
- Country: United States
- Language: Silent (English intertitles)

Sweet Memories (also known as Sweet Memories of Yesterday and Sweetheart Days) is a 1911 American silent short romantic drama film, written and directed by Thomas H. Ince, released by the Independent Moving Pictures Company on March 27, 1911.

== Plot ==
Polly Biblett introduces her grandmother Lettie to her boyfriend before they leave. This sparks memories of Lettie's own lifelong sweetheart, starting when they were infants and he gave her a flower, which she threw away, and kissed her. At 14, he painted her portrait and kissed her twice before they walked off with his arm around her shoulder. At 21, she still considered herself and him "children." He declared his feelings, and they danced a minuet with three other couples, a memory she treasures. When another man acted too forward with her, her sweetheart intervened and challenged him to a duel. They fenced with epees until she stopped them. The couple married and had a child, but Lettie's sweetheart died while still young. The granddaughter returns with her beau.

== Cast ==
- Mary Pickford as Polly Biblett
- King Baggot as Edward Jackson
- Owen Moore as Ashton Orcutt
- Jack Pickford as Young Earl Jackson (as Johnny Pickford)
- Lottie Pickford as Young Lettie Terrell
- Charles Arling (uncredited)
- Charlotte Smith Pickford as Lettie Terrell Jackson (uncredited)

== Production ==
Due to legal troubles, Carl Laemmle and IMP could not produce films in the United States at this time, so they relocated to Cuba for four months, working at the deserted Palacio del Carneado on the outskirts of Havana. The entire Pickford family—siblings Mary, Lottie and Jack, their mother Charlotte, and Mary's husband Owen Moore—went there, and all acted in the film.
