= King Baggot =

American actor and director (1879–1948)

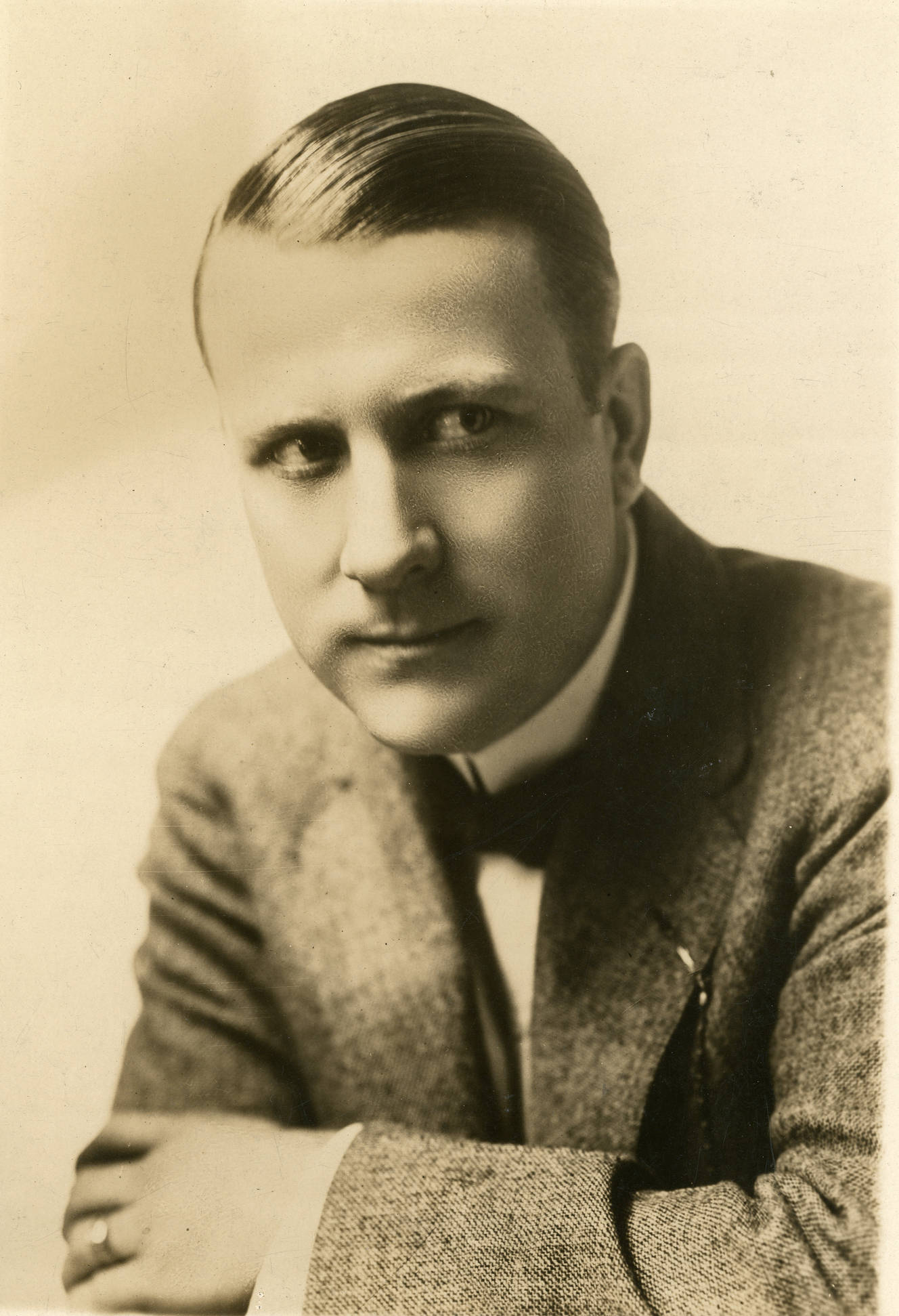
- Baggot in 1915
- Born: William King Baggot; November 7, 1879; St. Louis, Missouri, U.S.
- Died: July 11, 1948 (aged 68); Los Angeles, California, U.S.
- Resting place: Calvary Cemetery, Los Angeles, California, U.S.
- Occupations: Actor; film director; screenwriter
- Years active: 1900–1947
- Spouse: Ruth Constantine (m. 1912; div. 1930)
- Children: 2

William King Baggot (November 7, 1879 – July 11, 1948) was an American actor, film director, and screenwriter. He was an internationally famous movie star of the silent film era. The first individually publicized leading man in America, Baggot was referred to as "King of the Movies," "The Most Photographed Man in the World" and "The Man Whose Face Is as Familiar as the Man in the Moon."

Baggot appeared in over 300 motion pictures from 1909 to 1947; wrote 18 screenplays; and directed 45 movies from 1912 to 1928, including The Lie (1912), Raffles, the Amateur Cracksman (1925) and The House of Scandal (1928). He also directed William S. Hart in his most famous western, Tumbleweeds (1925).

Among his film appearances, he was best known for The Scarlet Letter (1911), Dr. Jekyll and Mr. Hyde (1913), and Ivanhoe (1913), which was filmed on location in Wales.

== Early life ==
He was born in St. Louis, Missouri, the son of William Baggot (1845–1909) and Harriet M. "Hattie" King (1859–1933). His siblings were Amos Taylor Baggot (1881–1954); Thomas Gantt Baggot (1889–1979); John Marmaduke Baggot (1891–1975); Arthur Lee Baggot (1893–?); Marion L. Baggot (1896–1973); and Harriet D. Baggot (1899–1930). William Baggot was born in Ireland, and emigrated from County Limerick to the United States in 1852. He was a prominent St. Louis real estate agent.

Baggot attended Christian Brothers College High School, a prominent Catholic all-male secondary school, where he excelled at sports, was a star soccer and baseball player, and became captain of the soccer team. In 1894, King left St. Louis and went to Chicago, where he worked as a clerk for his uncle, Edward Baggot (1839–1903), whose business sold plumbing, gas and electric fixtures.

In 1899, he returned to St. Louis and later played on a semi-professional St. Louis soccer team and became so well known that a Catholic church amateur theatrical group added him to its cast to gain prestige. He liked acting and did well. He soon helped found another amateur theatrical group, the Players Club of St. Louis.

In the meantime, he sold tickets for the St. Louis Browns baseball team and worked as a clerk in the real estate business of his father. But acting proved so interesting that he decided to become professional.

== Stage career ==
Baggot began his career on the stage in a Shakespearean stock company and toured throughout the U.S. Following his first engagement, he performed under the management of Liebler and Company, one of the foremost producing companies at that time. He also toured under the management of Frohman, and the Shuberts, and played five weeks in New York in The Queen of the Highway. Other plays in which he appeared include the comedy revival Mrs. Wiggs of the Cabbage Patch, which had a run on Broadway in 1906, Salomy Jane and In the Bishop's Carriage.

While acting in stock in St. Louis, in the summer of 1909, Baggot worked with Marguerite Clark in Peter Pan and The Golden Garter. In the two weeks that remained of the season, he played small roles in Frou Frou and Jenny, which both starred Countess Venturini. When the season closed, he was cast as supporting player with Marguerite Clark in the Schubert touring production of The Wishing Ring, which was adapted by Owen Davis from a Dorothea Deakin story. Another cast member, Cecil B. DeMille, also staged the play.

When The Wishing Ring closed in Chicago, Baggot returned to New York to join another company. Upon a chance meeting with Harry Solter, who was directing movies for Carl Laemmle at Independent Moving Pictures Company (IMP), he was persuaded to go with Solter to the studio. Movies were then looked down on by the dramatic profession as a mere recording of stunts, but Baggot went along. He was amused at the violent gestures and jumping around of the players, taking none of it seriously. Baggot, however, became interested in the fledgling industry and later decided to give it a try and turn picture player.

== Film career ==
Baggot's first film was the romance short The Awakening of Bess (1909) opposite Florence Lawrence. It was directed by Harry Solter, her husband, at IMP in Fort Lee, New Jersey. At a time when screen actors worked anonymously, Baggot and Lawrence became the first "movie stars" to be given billing, a marquee, and promotion in advertising.

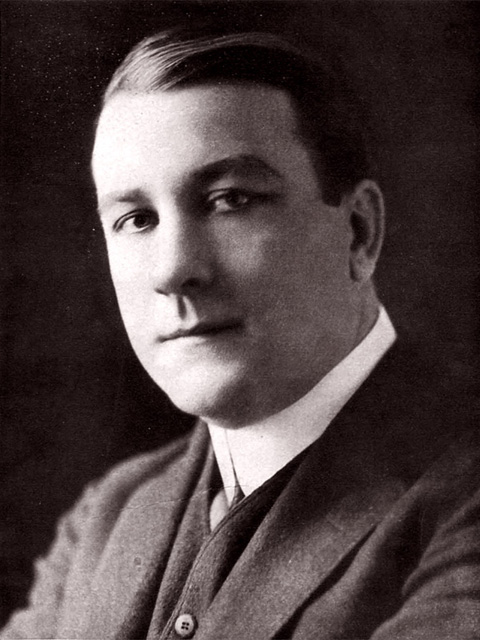
Baggot in 1916

In April 1910, Baggot was at home with his mother and family in St. Louis, when the U.S. census was taken there. He starred in at least 42 movies opposite Lawrence from 1909 to 1911. In the latter year, he starred in at least 16 movies with Mary Pickford, including Pictureland (1911). Pickford was hired to replace Lawrence after she and Solter broke their contracts, including the one-reel romance/drama Sweet Memories, which was directed by Thomas H. Ince.

Baggot also began writing screenplays and directing, all the while becoming a major star internationally. When he appeared "in person" at theatres he was mobbed at stage doors. By 1912, he was so famous that when he took the leading part in forming the prestigious Screen Club in New York, the first organization of its kind strictly for movie people, he was the natural choice for its first president.

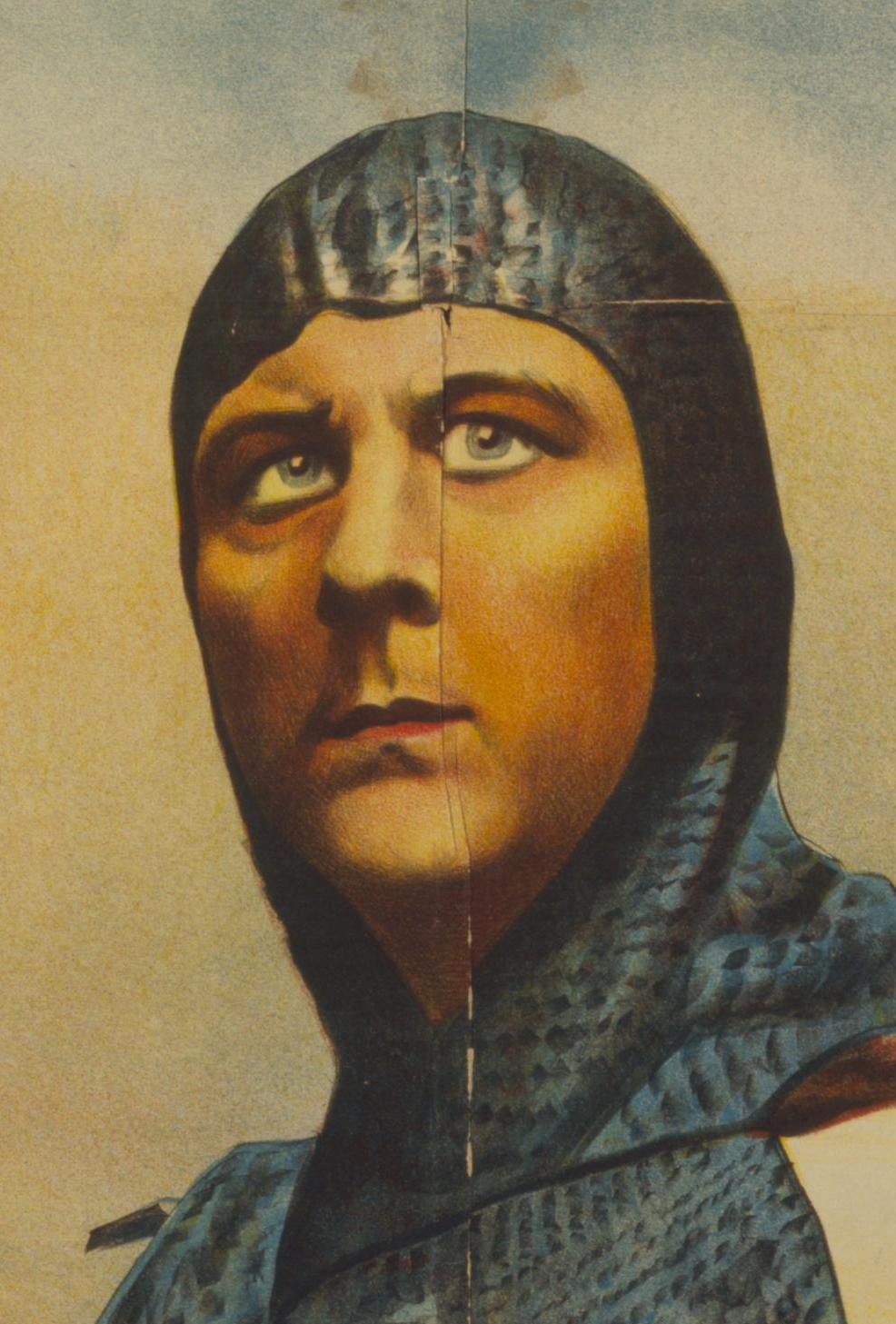
Baggot as title character in Ivanhoe (1913)

Baggot starred as Wilfred of Ivanhoe in Ivanhoe (1913), a feature-length adventure drama that was filmed on location in England and at Chepstow Castle in Wales. He played the role of Jean Dumas in the drama Absinthe (1914), which was filmed in Paris. In his 1914 two-reel movie Shadows, Baggot directed as well as played the parts of ten different characters.

When he registered for the draft of World War I, on September 12, 1918, Baggot and his wife were living in New York City. He starred in the role as Harrison Grant in the 20-part spy thriller The Eagle's Eye (1918) opposite Marguerite Snow, an adaptation of former FBI Director William J. Flynn's experiences that was produced by Leopold and Theodore Wharton, and as Sheldon Steele (The Hawk) in the crime drama The Hawk's Trail (1919) opposite Grace Darmond.

As a director, he gave Marie Prevost her first starring role in the romantic comedy Kissed (1922). Baggot directed Mary Philbin and William Haines in the romance The Gaiety Girl (1924).

He formed his own production company, King Baggot Productions, and produced and directed The Home Maker (1925), a drama starring Clive Brook and Alice Joyce about the reversal of traditional roles between a husband and wife, which was released through Universal. That same year, Baggot directed William S. Hart in his most famous western, Tumbleweeds, a drama about the Oklahoma land rush of 1893.

== Personal life ==
On December 3, 1912, he and Ruth Considine (August 28, 1889 – December 22, 1936) were married in Fort Lee, New Jersey. They had one son, Robert King Baggot (July 11, 1914 – May 18, 1965). A cameraman, he died in Hawaii, while working on a movie. Robert King Baggot had two sons, cinematographer Stephen King Baggot (born 1943) and Bruce Baggot (born 1947).

== Decline ==
Baggot and his wife, Ruth, who had separated on August 20, 1926, were divorced in 1930. She filed on grounds of desertion, stating in the complaint that he was a bad example to their son. She said he would return home after drinking and be in a boisterous mood. When the 1930 census was taken on April 7, Baggot was lodging by himself.

His alcoholism and problems with certain studio executives eventually ended Baggot's directing career. He turned to playing character roles, bit parts and even jobs as an extra, and appeared in scores of movies in that capacity through the 1930s and 1940s, including Mississippi (1935).

Baggot played the uncredited role as a policeman on the street in Bad Sister (1931), which starred Conrad Nagel and Sidney Fox, with Bette Davis in her first movie role. He had the role as Henry Field, a movie director, in the Monogram Pictures drama Police Court (1932) co-starring Henry B. Walthall, which told the story of a has-been alcoholic actor (Walthall) trying to make a comeback. In 1933, Baggot and former leading lady Florence Lawrence, Paul Panzer and another former great star of the silent era, Francis Ford, were given bit parts in what would be former co-star Mary Pickford's last movie, Secrets.

In her Los Angeles Times gossip column on March 1, 1946, Hedda Hopper wrote, "King Baggot, who used to be one of our top directors, is working as an extra in The Show-Off. While living at the Aberdeen Hotel in Venice, California, Baggot made his final movie appearance in the uncredited part of a bank employee in the comedy My Brother Talks to Horses (1947) starring Butch Jenkins and Peter Lawford. Illness then forced his retirement.

King Baggot died at age 68 from a stroke at a sanatorium in Los Angeles. His funeral service was conducted in the chapel of Pierce Brothers Hollywood Mortuary at 1 p.m. on Thursday, July 15, 1948. He is interred in Calvary Cemetery, East Los Angeles.

For his contributions to the film industry, Baggot received a motion pictures star on the Hollywood Walk of Fame in 1960. His star is located at 6312 Hollywood Boulevard.

== Filmography ==
=== As actor ===
Year	Title	Role	Notes
1910	The Time-Lock Safe	The Father	Short
1911	Sweet Memories	Edward Jackson	Short
1911	The Scarlet Letter	Reverend Dimmesdale	Short
1911	Pictureland	Pablo	Short
1911	Tracked	Roger Densmore	Short
1912	The Lie	Captain Robert Evans	Short
1912	The Man from the West	Steve Jackson - The Man from the West	Short
1912	A Cave Man Wooing	George - The 'Sissy' Hero	Short
1912	The Romance of an Old Maid	Frank Rogers - a Widower	Short
1912	Up Against It	Amos Bentley	Short
1913	Gold Is Not All	Karl - the Composer	Short
1913	Dr. Jekyll and Mr. Hyde	Dr. Henry Jekyll / Mr. Hyde	Short
1913	Ivanhoe	Wilfred of Ivanhoe	
1914	Absinthe	Jean Dumas	
1914	The Old Guard		
1915	The Corsican Brothers	Louis de Franchi / Fabien de Franchi	Short
1915	The Marble Heart	Raphael / Phidias	
1915	The Suburban	Donald Gordon	
1916	Half a Rogue	Richard Warrington	
1916	The Man from Nowhere	James Herron	
1918	The Eagle's Eye	Harrison Grant	
1918	Kildare of Storm	Basil Kildare	
1919	The Hawk's Trail	Sheldon Steele (The Hawk)	serial
1919	The Man Who Stayed at Home	Christopher Brent	
1920	The Thirtieth Piece of Silver	Tyler Cole	
1920	The Cheater	Lord Asgarby	
1921	The Girl in the Taxi	Maj. Frederick Smith	
1923	The Thrill Chaser		Cameo appearance
1932	Police Court	Henry Field	
1935	Mississippi	Gambler	Uncredited
1939	Stronger Than Desire	Juror	Uncredited
1941	Come Live with Me	Doorman	
1942	Jackass Mail	Old Miner	Uncredited

=== As director ===
- The Lie (1912, short)
- Cheated Love (1921)
- Luring Lips (1921)
- Nobody's Fool (1921)
- Moonlight Follies (1921)
- The Lavender Bath Lady (1922)
- Human Hearts (1922)
- Kissed (1922)
- A Dangerous Game (1922)
- The Darling of New York (1923)
- Gossip (1923)
- Crossed Wires (1923)
- The Whispered Name (1924)
- The Tornado (1924)
- The Gaiety Girl (1924)
- Raffles, the Amateur Cracksman (1925)
- The Home Maker (1925)
- Tumbleweeds (1925)
- Lovey Mary (1926)
- Perch of the Devil (1927)
- Down the Stretch (1927)
- The Notorious Lady (1927)
- The House of Scandal (1928)
- Romance of a Rogue (1928)
