= Independent Moving Pictures =

American film studio folded into Universal Pictures

Independent Moving Pictures Company
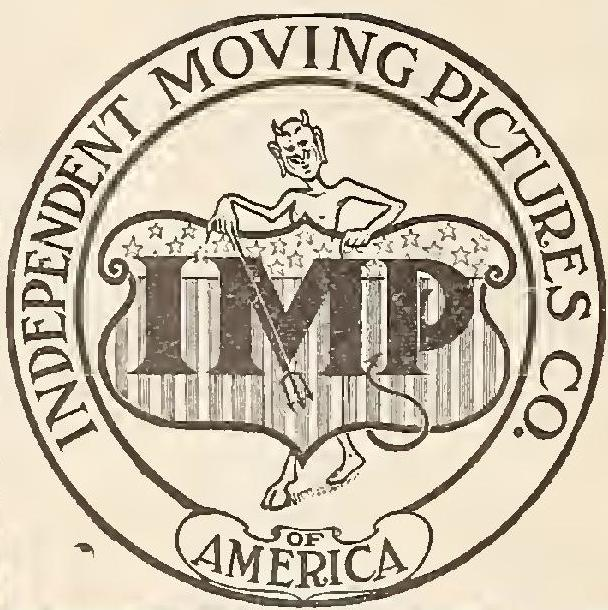
- Founded: 1909; 117 years ago United States
- Founder: Carl Laemmle
- Defunct: April 30, 1912; 114 years ago
- Fate: Folded into Universal Pictures

The Independent Moving Pictures Company (IMP) was a motion picture studio and production company founded in 1909 by Carl Laemmle. The company was based in New York City, with production facilities in Fort Lee, New Jersey. In 1912, IMP merged with several other production companies to form Universal Film Manufacturing Company, later renamed Universal Pictures Company with Laemmle as president.

== History ==
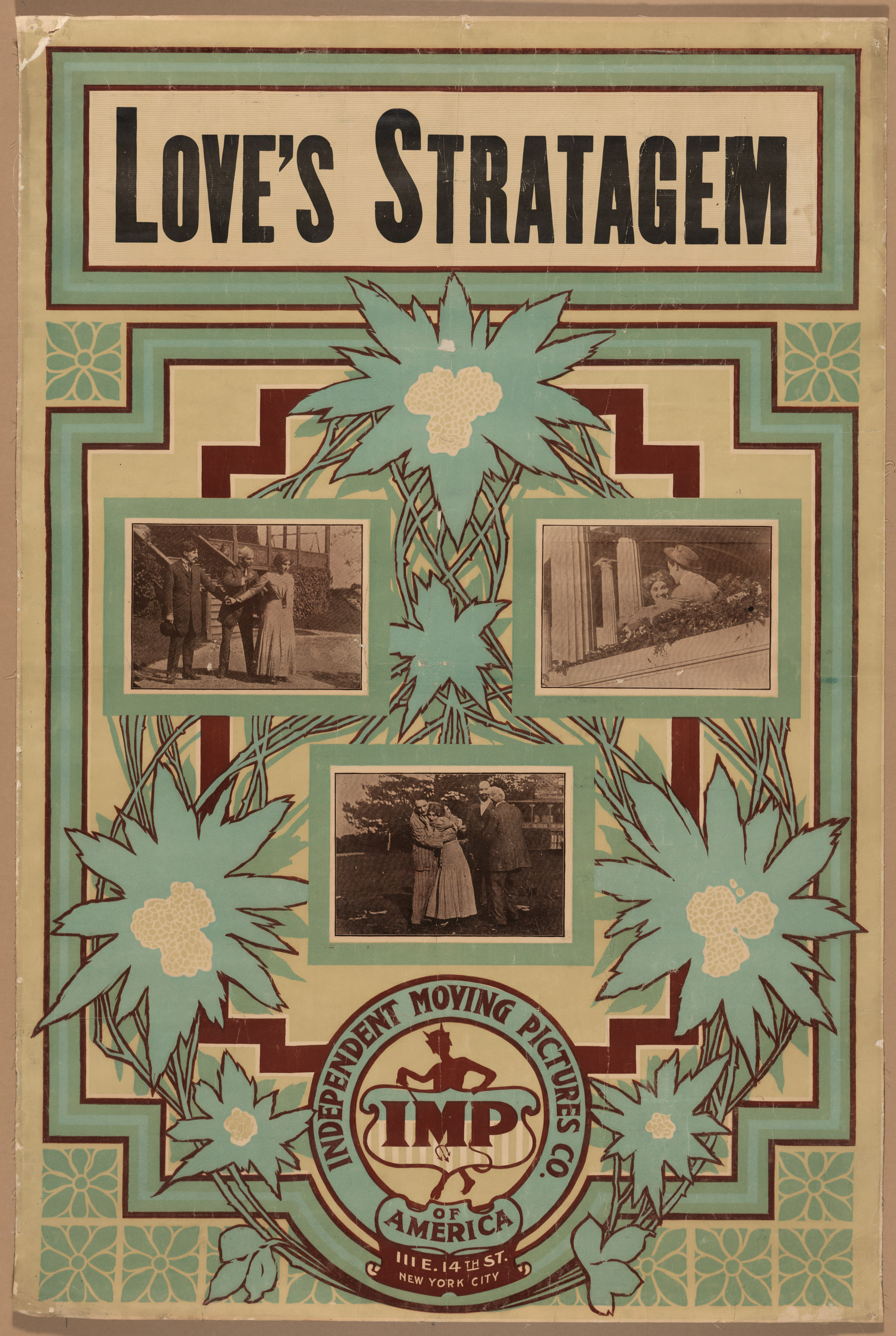
Poster for Love's Strategem (1909)

The Independent Moving Pictures Company was founded in 1909 by Carl Laemmle and was located at 573 11th Ave New York City, with a studio in Fort Lee, New Jersey.

The first movie produced by IMP was Hiawatha (1909) starring Gladys Hulette, a one-reel drama short based on the 1855 poem The Song of Hiawatha by Henry Wadsworth Longfellow. At a time when leading screen players worked anonymously, IMP performers Florence Lawrence, formerly known as "The Biograph Girl," and King Baggot became the first "movie stars" to be given billing and screen credits, a marquee as well as promotion in advertising, which contributed to the creation of the star system.

In the early 20th century, the Motion Picture Patents Company, or the Trust, was fought by the unlicensed independent films (dubbed "pirates" or "outlaws"), led by Laemmle. Others against the MPPC included Harry E. Aitken (Majestic Films), William Fox (founder of the Fox Film Corporation), and Adolph Zukor (Famous Players Film Company, a precursor to Paramount). The flexible, stealthy and adventurous independents avoided coercive MPPC restrictions (the requirement to use only Trust film stock and projectors, for example) by using unlicensed equipment, obtaining their own film materials, and making movies on the sly. After many of the independents, including IMP, organized their distribution subsidiaries into the Motion Picture Distributing and Sales Company in mid-1910, with Laemmle as their president, the Trust issued an injunction against Laemmle for the camera being used, claiming that it was an infringement on their patents, but eventually lost.

Before long, the independents began moving to Southern California, and opened up a West Coast movie-making industry. In 1910, IMP began production in Los Angeles, and had a studio in Hollywood at Sunset Boulevard and Gower Street, which became known as "Gower Gulch" due to the actors dressed as cowboys and Indians waiting on that corner to be cast in Westerns.

By May 1912, the Motion Picture Distributing and Sales Company began to collapse, its supporting production companies removing their distribution needs to other companies or under their own direction. On June 10, 1912, the assets of Independent Moving Pictures were transferred to the newly incorporated Universal Film Manufacturing Company, which undertook to distribute for several of the departing Sales Company producers in continued opposition to the Edison trust. IMP was corporately dissolved but its name continued to be used as a brand name for Laemmle's productions.

In 1913, Jack Cohn was put in charge of production at IMP's studio at Tenth Avenue and 59th Street, and he and his brother, Harry Cohn, made their first film, Traffic in Souls. In 1918 the Cohns and another IMP employee, Joe Brandt, left to form Cohn-Brandt-Cohn (CBC) Film Sales Corporation which later became Columbia Pictures.

== Selected filmography ==
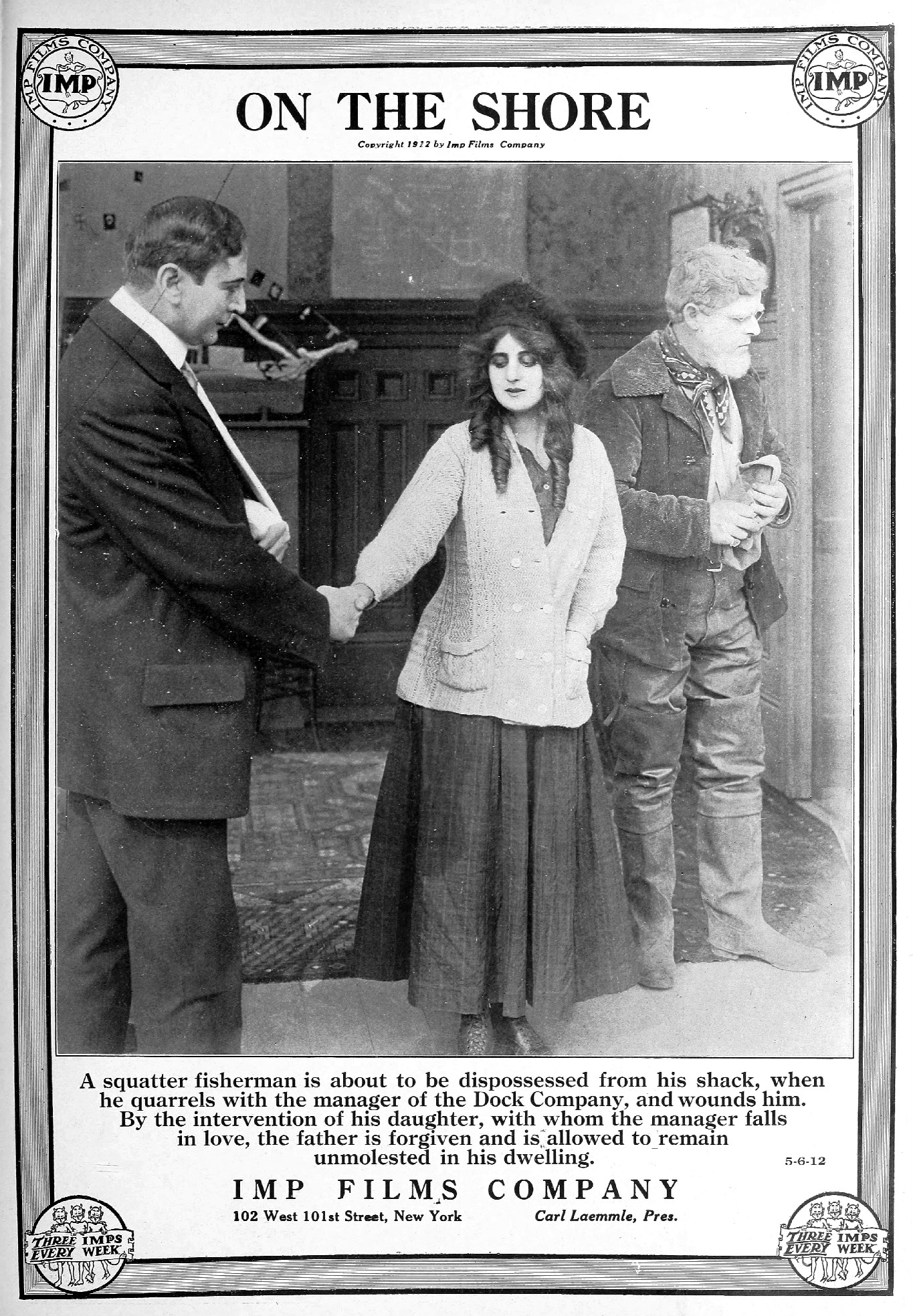
Advertisement for On the Shore (1912)

- The Broken Oath (1910)
- You Saved My Life (1910)
- Their First Misunderstanding (1911)
- The Dream (1911)
- Artful Kate (1911)
- Pictureland (1911)
- Sweet Memories (1911)
- The Bridal Room (1912)
- A Millionaire for a Day (1912)
- Gold Is Not All (1913)
- Ivanhoe (1913)
- Traffic in Souls (1913)
- Dr. Jekyll and Mr. Hyde (1913)
