= Lena Rivers =

Lena Rivers may refer to:

- The Lena River
- Lena Rivers (book), a novel by Mary Jane Holmes
  - Lena Rivers (1910 film), an adaptation by the Thanhouser Company
  - Lena Rivers (1914 Cosmos film), an adaptation by the Cosmos Film Corp (*Beulah Poynter)
  - Lena Rivers (1914 Whitman film), an adaptation by Whitman Features, released by Blinkhorn Photoplays Corp (*Violet Horner)
  - Lena Rivers (1925 film), an adaptation by Chord Pictures
  - Lena Rivers (1932 film), an adaptation by the Quadruple Film Corp
