= Lizzie Conway =

- Born: April 10, 1846; Philadelphia
- Died: May 4, 1916 (aged 70); Milwaukee
- Occupation: Actor
- Spouse(s): George W. Conway
- Children: Isabel Conway, Bertie Conway

Lizzie Conway (April 10, 1846 – May 4, 1916) was an American stage and film actor.

She was born Lizzie Letford on April 10, 1846 in Philadelphia. Her professional debut was alongside Edwin Forrest in Henry VIII at the Chestnut Street Theatre in 1865. In her fifty year stage career, her many roles included Bridget in Clyde Fitch's Lover's Lane (1901) at the Manhattan Theatre, Mrs. Michael Cochran in Sydney Rosenfeld's The Aero Club (1907) at the Criterion Theatre, and in Earl W. Mayo's Cape Cod Folks (1906) at the Academy of Music.

She starred in a number of short films from Edison Studios and played the grandmother of Beulah Poynter in Lena Rivers (1914).

She was married to theatrical manager George W. Conway for over fifty years. They had two daughters, actresses Isabel Conway and Bertie Conway.

== Filmography ==
- A Cause for Thankfulness (1913)
- His Undesirable Relatives (1913)
- Nora's Boarders (1913)
- The Romance of Rowena (1913)
- Starved Out (1913)
- A Story of a Crime (1914)
- Lena Rivers (1914)
