= Blanche Crozier =

Canadian actress (1881–1957)

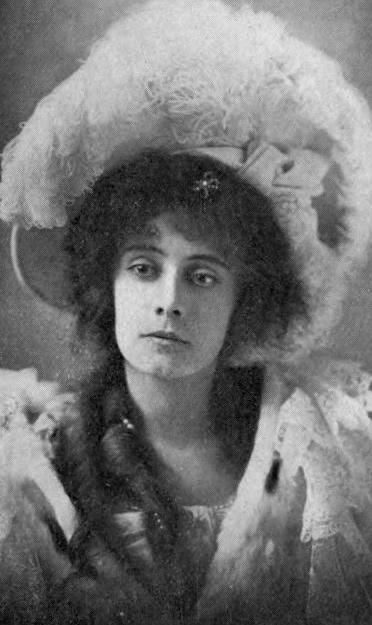
- Blanche Crozier, from a 1901 publication.
- Born: 1881; Lanark, Ontario, Canada
- Died: May 31, 1957 (aged 75–76)
- Other name: Blanche Sibbitt
- Occupation: actress

Blanche Crozier (1881 – May 31, 1957) was a Canadian actress, working in Canadian and American stock companies in the early twentieth century. She later married the Scotch-American film director James Colin Campbell.

== Early life ==
Born as Blanche Sibbitt in Lanark to Robert and Jane Sibbitt, she was later raised in Brantford, Ontario.

She attended the Toronto Conservatory of Music from 1897 to 1898. She won the Gold Medal in elocution during the visit of the Governor General in 1898. Harry Nelson Shaw was her instructor. Later that year, he would leave the school to form his own theatrical troupe as the "Harold Nelson Stock Company." She joined the cast, assuming her paternal grandmother's name, Blanche Crozier. The troupe traveled westward from Ontario, through Manitoba, and Saskatchewan, until falling ill in Manitoba.

== Career ==
Crozier acted in the Nelson Stock Company in Winnipeg, and in other companies in western Canada, early in her career. She played Juliet while still in her teens. In 1901 she was described as a new member of Edwin Thanhouser's stock company. She was seen in ingenue roles in Nashville, Tennessee, as a member of the Boyle Stock Company, in 1903 and 1904. In 1906 she appeared with the Brown-Baker Stock Company in New Orleans, in Graustark. In 1907, she starred in a North Carolina production of Lena Rivers, based on the novel by Mary Jane Holmes.

She was still playing young and breeches roles in 1909, including Balthazar in Romeo and Juliet. "Blanche Crozier is so good in all the parts for which she may be cast that her merit cannot be concealed in any of them," commented one reviewer. She starred in Texas in Chicago in 1910. She was described by one historian as having a "brief career" on Broadway.

== Marriage and widowhood ==
Her tours with various stock companies put her in contact a rising actor and director, Colin Campbell. After Campbell took charge of Selig's studios in Los Angeles, they were married on March 2, 1912.

After her husband's sudden death in 1928, no records are available until 1940, when she is recorded as living in St. James, New York. She died on May 31, 1957, and is interred at Cedar Hill Cemetery.
