= Lena Rivers (1914 Cosmos film) =

- Written by: Mary J. Holmes (novel)
- Produced by: Cosmos Feature Film Corporation
- Starring: Beulah Poynter
- Distributed by: Cosmos Feature Film Corporation
- Release date: October 15, 1914
- Running time: 5 reels
- Country: United States
- Language: Silent..English titles

Lena Rivers is a 1914 American silent feature film based on Mary J. Holmes novel and produced and distributed by Cosmos Feature Film Corporation. It stars Beulah Poynter, who adapted the novel into a play in 1906 and starred in the play. The film was the first of two film of the same title released in 1914.

A print is preserved in the UCLA Film & Television Archive.

== Cast ==
- Beulah Poynter - Helena Nichols, Lena Rivers
- Lizzie Conway - Granny
- Robert Tabor - Harry Graham
- Charlie De Forest - Joel Scovendyke
- Caroline Rankin - Nancy Scovendyke
- Walter Armin - John Nichols
- Marie Mason - Lucy Belmont
- Winifred Burke - Caroline
