= The Blackbird =

1926 film

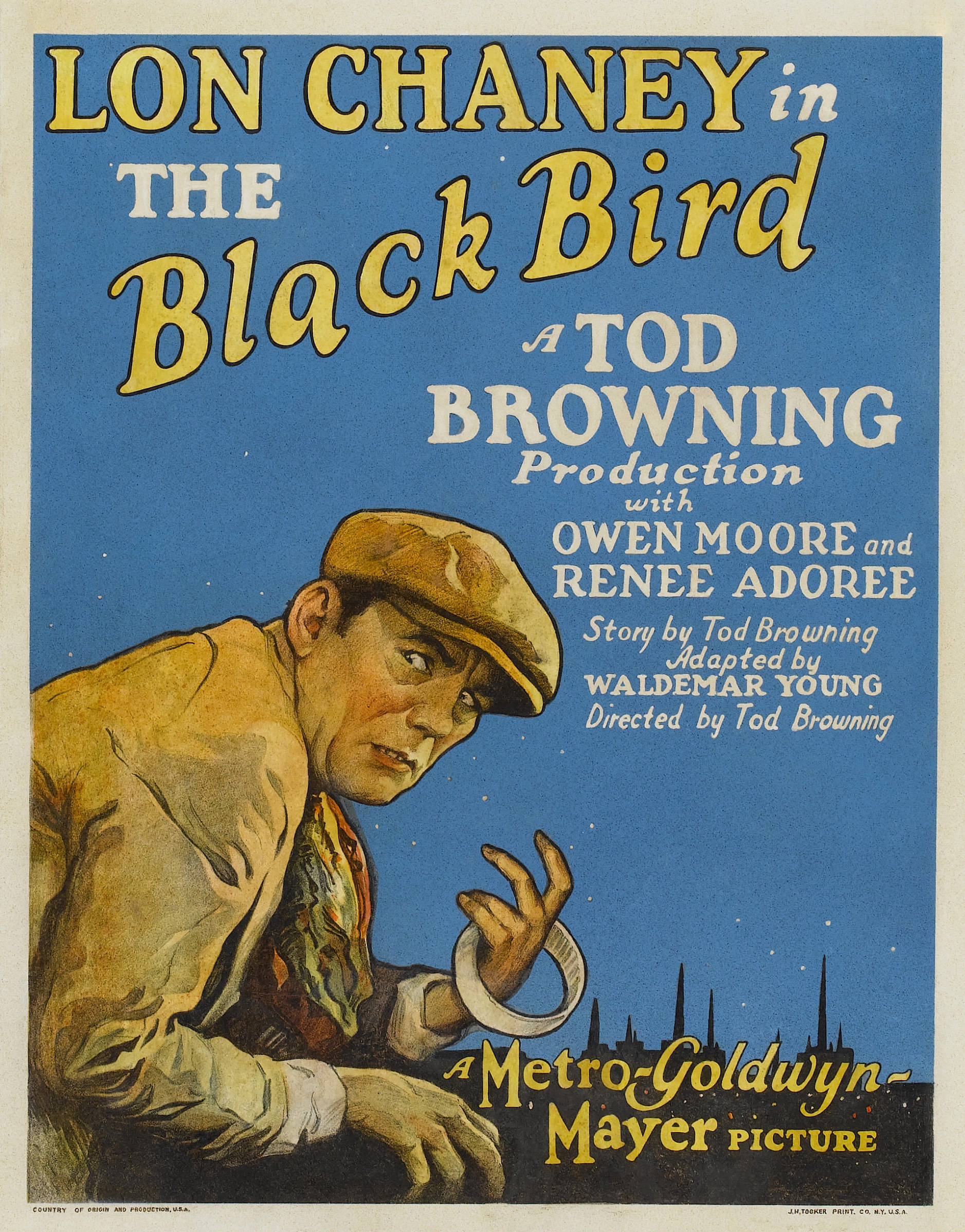
- Directed by: Tod Browning
- Written by: Waldemar Young; Joseph Farnham (titles)
- Story by: Tod Browning
- Produced by: Irving G. Thalberg
- Starring: Lon Chaney; Owen Moore; Renée Adorée; Owen Moore
- Cinematography: Percy Hilburn
- Edited by: Errol Taggart; Irving Thalberg (uncredited)
- Distributed by: Metro-Goldwyn-Mayer
- Release date: January 11, 1926
- Running time: 77 minutes (7 reels)
- Country: United States
- Language: Silent (English intertitles)

The Blackbird is a 1926 American silent crime film directed by Tod Browning and starring Lon Chaney. The screenplay was written by Waldemar Young, based on a story "The Mockingbird" by Tod Browning (which was originally supposed to be the film's title). Cedric Gibbons and Arnold Gillespie handled the set design. Makeup man Cecil Holland also played one of the old men living at the mission. Character actors Eddie Sturgis and Willie Fung appeared in several other Lon Chaney movies during this time period. The film took 31 days to shoot at a cost of $166,000. The tagline was "Lon Chaney in his successor to The Unholy Three". Stills on the internet shows Chaney in his dual role. In April 2012, the film became available on DVD from the Warner Archive collection.

== Plot ==
The Blackbird (1926)

A title card introduces the setting as London's Limehouse district, "with its lust, greed and love, a sea of fog, a drama of human faces.” A cheap music hall is overseen by the tough Dan Tate, who also manages a small gang of thieves under the alias "The Blackbird." As a cover, though, Tate also poses as his own deformed and noble twin brother, affectionately known as the "Bishop of Limehouse," who supposedly lives above an adjoining mission for the poor. When police arrive at the mission and accuse The Blackbird of robbery, he offers the alibi that he had been sleeping in his room and goes to get to get his "brother" to confirm his story. While the police hear two apparently different voices talking, Dan changes clothes and contorts his body, with his arms and legs at extreme angles, then making his way down the stairs with a crutch as The Bishop, verifying The Blackbird's alibi.

Later at the music hall, a "slumming" group of upper-class Londoners arrives, led by the apparently wealthy and respectable Bertram P. Glade, who is really a thief known to Dan and others as "West End Bertie." At the same time, Polly, Dan's former wife, returns to the music hall after a long absence, apparently to Dan's displeasure. Both Dan and Bertie are attracted to Fifi Lorraine, a puppeteer and dancer performing on the stage. She in turn is attracted to the diamond choker worn by a woman in Bertie's group.

Bertie arranges to have his group robbed by his own men and takes the choker and other jewelry he received to his home, where he is confronted by The Blackbird, who insists that he is owed a portion of Bertie's haul. The two settle on a coin toss to decide who will get the choker, which Dan wins. The next night, however, Bertie succeeds in taking Fifi home after her performance despite Dan's efforts to woo her. In the meantime, Polly approaches her ex-husband, trying to appeal to the better side that she sees in him.

Bertie and Fifi fall in love with each other and go to The Bishop to ask him to perform their marriage. In his disguise, Dan exposes Bertie's occupation to Fifi. The gentleman thief promises to reform and return his stolen goods, but Dan alerts the police, who raid Bertie's home. Dan shoots one of the policemen, expecting the crime to be pinned on Bertie, who is then hidden by The Bishop after Fifi pleads for his help. As The Bishop, Dan works to turn Bertie and Fifi against each other so that he can declare his own love to her, but one of The Blackbird's men tells the police who actually shot the officer.

Polly has become aware that the police are coming to arrest The Blackbird and goes to warn Dan, but she finds him kissing Fifi, who leaves the room. Hoping to throw the police off his trail, Dan stages a "fight" between his two identities behind the closed door of The Bishop's room above the mission. When the door is opened suddenly, it strikes Dan, who is now dressed as The Bishop. He falls and breaks his back while in his contorted pose. The police enter and place The Bishop on his bed and leave to chase after the supposedly fugitive Blackbird. When Polly enters, Dan asks her to burn The Blackbird's clothing, which he had hidden in the corner, and she finally realizes that the two "brothers" are the same man. Dan's injuries, though, are severe and he soon dies, to be mourned in his "good" identity by the people he actually helped, while Bertie and Fifi are reunited, presumably to marry.

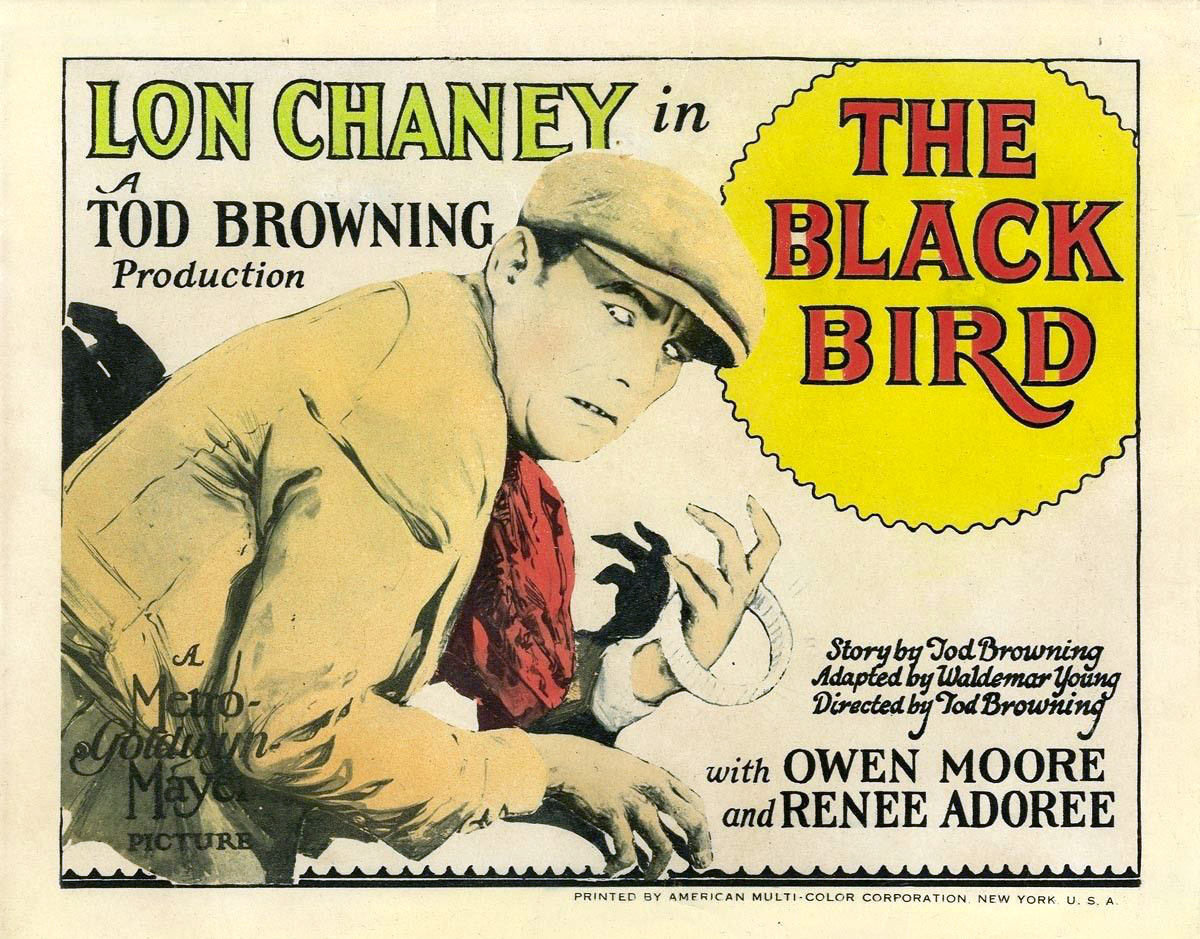
Lobby card

== Cast ==
- Lon Chaney dual role as Dan Tate 'The Blackbird' and "The Bishop"
- Owen Moore as Bertram P. 'West End Bertie' Glayde
- Renée Adorée as Mademoiselle Fifi Lorraine
- Doris Lloyd as Limehouse Polly
- Andy MacLennan as The Shadow
- William Weston as Red
- Sidney Bracey as Bertie's No. 1 Man
- Ernie Adams as Bertie's No. 2 Man
- Charles Avery as Music Hall Patron (uncredited)
- Lionel Belmore as Music Hall Proprietor (uncredited)
- Margaret Bert as Minor Role (uncredited)
- Peggy Best as Minor Role (uncredited)
- Louise Emmons as Old Lady at Mission (uncredited)
- Willie Fung as Chinese Man (uncredited)
- Fred Gamble as Man Saying There's a Present for Fifi (uncredited)
- Cecil Holland as Old Man at Mission (uncredited)
- Bertram Johns as Member of Bertie's Slumming Party (uncredited)
- Billy Mack as Minor Role (uncredited)
- James T. Mack as Doctor (uncredited)
- Eric Mayne as Member of Bertie's Slumming Party (uncredited)
- Polly Moran as Flower Lady at Music Hall (uncredited)
- Frank Norcross as Music Hall Announcer (uncredited)
- Eddie Sturgis as Bartender (uncredited)

== Reception ==
The film received positive reviews, especially for Chaney's performance in his scenes transitioning from "The Blackbird" to the twisted body of "The Bishop," but it was judged as not being as good as some of Chaney's previous films. The film did earn a profit of $63,000, but that was the lowest return of any of Chaney's films for MGM.

"They're still playing up the fact that Lon Chaney can make himself more hideous and misshapen than anybody in pictures...THE BLACKBIRD is an okeh (sic) picture---good for the first runs and the smaller houses. What's more remarkable about it is that Chaney, who has recently had a great run of pictures (with a corresponding rise in fame), sticks to his more or less old line with outstanding success." ---Variety

"Mr. Chaney's depiction of the two types of the crook is one of the finest exemplifications of screen artistry one would hope to behold." ---The New York Times

"Chaney in another masterful performance with crook story background that is both novel and interesting. Great suspense and dramatic action. Chaney reaches his customary heights for unusual characterization". --- Film Daily

"This is one of the finest characterizations to Chaney's credit. He doesn't resort to heavy makeup to put over his character....Tod Browning's direction is just as remarkable....so mystifying that we'll wager you'll like to see it again" ---Photoplay

"Although I didn't find it as absorbing a tale as (The Unholy Three), it was quite thrilling enough. When Lon Chaney takes to playing a double role, you may be sure that he will come to no good end....it's a marvelous part for Chaney; he enjoys his villainy so." ---Picture Play

"Mr. Chaney's acting is wonderful but the story is weak. The attempt to produce another The Unholy Three success therefore has missed fire. Mr. Chaney assumes a Dr. Jekyll and Mr. Hyde role. In the "cripple" part, his acting is superb. Long lines formed at the Capitol last Sunday even though the weather condition was very bad. It is evident that the picture will draw." ---Harrison's Reports
