= Joseph W. Farnham =

American screenwriter

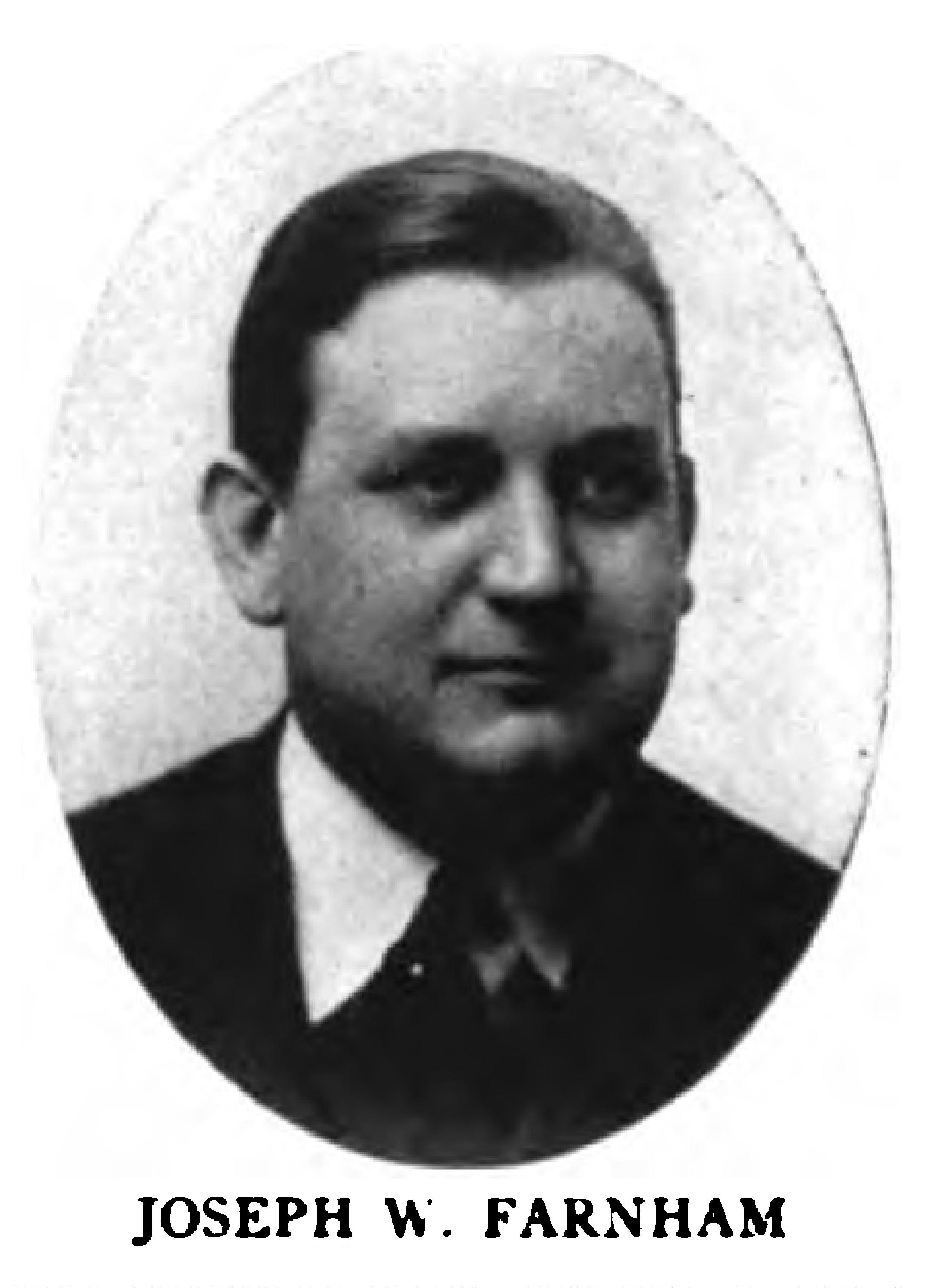
- Born: Joseph White Farnham; December 2, 1884; New Haven, Connecticut, U.S.
- Died: June 2, 1931 (aged 46); Los Angeles, California, U.S.
- Burial place: Forest Lawn Memorial Park
- Occupation: Screenwriter
- Years active: 1918–1930

Joseph White Farnham (December 2, 1884 – June 2, 1931) was an American playwright, film writer, and film editor of the silent movie era in the 1920s. He was also a founding member of the Academy of Motion Picture Arts and Sciences.

== Biography ==
Born in New Haven, Connecticut in 1884, Farnham got his start in film through his business relationship with theatre impresarios Gustave and Daniel Frohman who owned The Frohman Amusement Corp. The Big Parade is probably the most famous of his works adapted to film. For the 1st Academy Awards held in 1929, Farnham won the Best Writing - Title Cards award, which was not attributed to any particular film. The films he worked on during the eligibility period were The Fair Co-Ed; Laugh, Clown, Laugh; and Telling the World. This was the only year that an Oscar for title cards would be awarded.

It was Joseph Farnham who was assigned by Irving Thalberg to reduce Erich Von Stroheim's Greed to the bowdlerized form we have today.

In 1930, Farnham contributed dialogue to four MGM musicals: So This Is College, Montana Moon. Good News and Love in the Rough.

Joseph Farnham was the very first Academy Award winner to die. He died in 1931 of a heart attack while living in Los Angeles and was interred in the Forest Lawn Memorial Park Cemetery in Glendale, California.

== Selected filmography ==
- Alias Jimmy Valentine (1920)
- Bachelor Apartments (1921)
- The Country Flapper (1922)
- The Snitching Hour (1922)
- Greed (1924)
- Reckless Romance (1924)
- Soul Mates (1925)
- The Big Parade (1925)
- Stop Flirting (1925)
- The Blackbird (1926)
- Beverly of Graustark (1926)
- The Road to Mandalay (1926)
- The Show (1927)
- The Red Mill (1927)
- Slide, Kelly, Slide (1927)
- Rookies (1927)
- Becky (1927)
- London After Midnight (1927)
- The Unknown (1927)
- The Trail of '98 (1928)
- Laugh, Clown, Laugh (1928)
- The Cameraman (1928)
- The Duke Steps Out (1929)
- Where East Is East (1929)
- The Unholy Night (1929)
- The Thirteenth Chair (1929)
- The Big House (1930)
