= Bernard Nedell =

American actor (1893–1972)

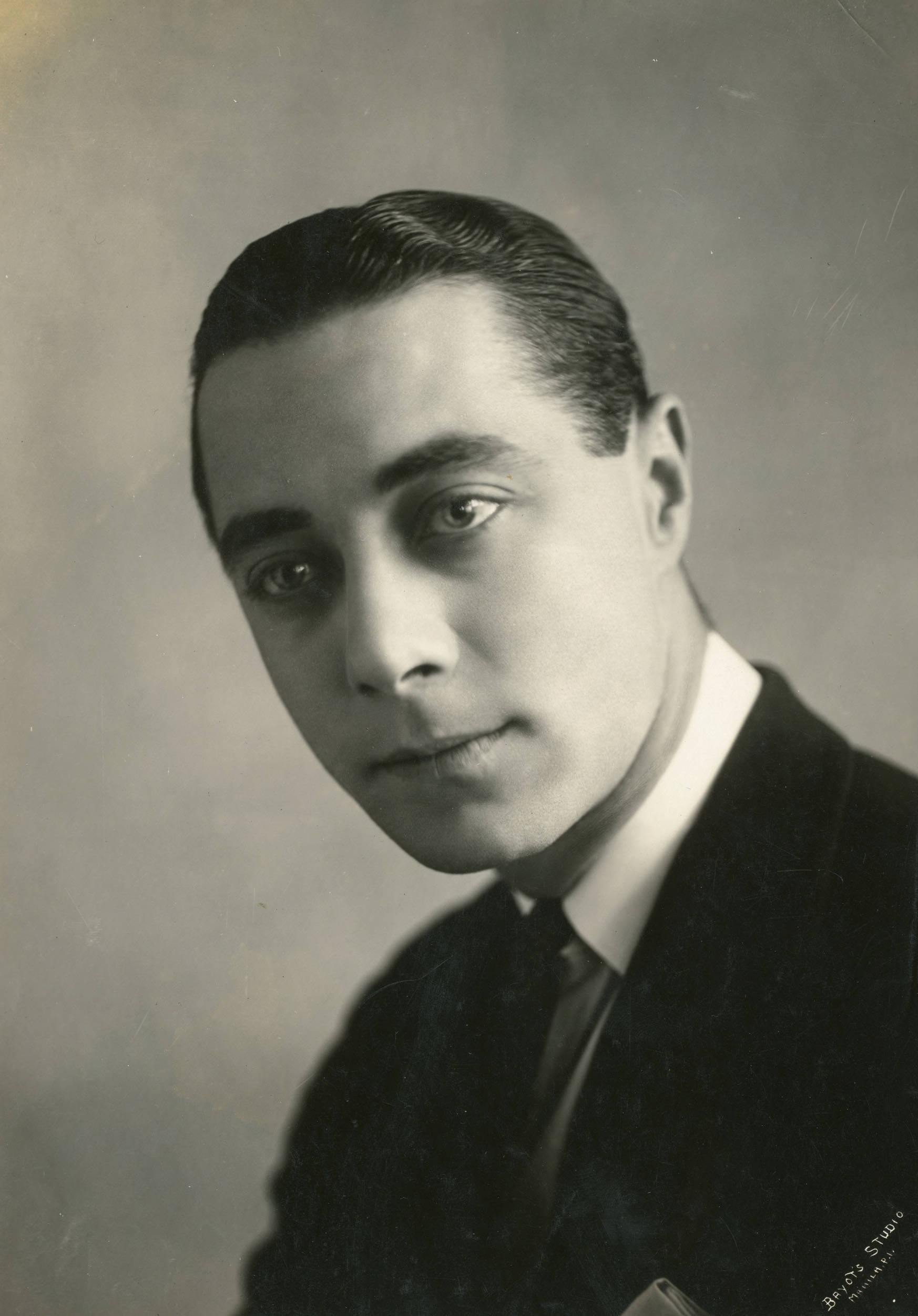
- Studio portrait of Bernard Nedell for The Thirteenth Girl, 1922
- Born: Bernard Jay Nedell; October 14, 1893; New York City U.S.
- Died: November 23, 1972 (aged 79); Hollywood, California, U.S.
- Education: Western Reserve University
- Occupation: Actor
- Years active: 1916–1972
- Spouse(s): Helen Porter Nichols aka Betty Barnicoat (m. 1921; died 1923); Olive Blakeney (m. circa 1927; died 1959)
- Children: 1

Bernard Jay Nedell (October 14, 1893 – November 23, 1972), sometimes billed as Bernard J. Nedell, was an American actor of stage and screen. He appeared in 50 films between 1916 and 1972.

== Early life and career ==
Born in New York City on October 14, 1893, Nedell was one of at least two children born to stage actors Rose Mary (née Speyer) and William Louis Nedell. He attended Western Reserve University in Cleveland, Ohio.

In the early 1920s, Nedell acted with the T. Daniel Frawley Company.

== Personal life and death ==
From April 16, 1921 until her premature death on September 17, 1923, Nedell was married to his fellow actor and sometime leading lady Helen Porter Nichols (stage name, Betty Barnicoat). By no later than 1927, he had remarried, again to an actress / fellow American expatriate and sometime stage co-star, Olive Blakeney. This marriage produced Nedell's only child, daughter Betty Lou Nedell, who would later marry her mother's frequent onscreen son, actor Jimmy "Henry Aldrich" Lydon.

Predeceased by his wife, Nedell died in Hollywood on November 23, 1972, aged 79, survived by his daughter and a brother.

== Selected filmography ==
- Bachelor Apartments (1921) - Janitor
- A Knight in London (1928) - Prince Zalnoff
- The Silver King (1929) - Capt. 'Spider' Skinner
- The Return of the Rat (1929) - Henri de Verrat
- The Man from Chicago (1930) - Nick Dugan
- Call of the Sea (1930) - Ramon Tares
- Shadows (1931) - Press Rawlinson
- The Innocents of Chicago (1932) - Tony Costello
- Her Imaginary Lover (1933) - Davidson
- The Girl in Possession (1934) - De Courville
- Lazybones (1935) - Michael McCarthy
- Heat Wave (1935) - Gen. Da Costa
- The First Offence (1936) - The Boss
- The Live Wire (1937) - James Cody
- Oh Boy! (1938) - Angelo Tonelli
- Mr. Moto's Gamble (1938) - Clipper McCoy
- Exposed (1938) - Mike Romero
- Secret Service of the Air (1939) - Earl 'Ace' Hemrich
- Lucky Night (1939) - 'Dusty' Sawyer
- Some Like It Hot (1939) - Stephen Hanratty
- They All Come Out (1939) - Clyde Madigan - 'Reno'
- The Angels Wash Their Faces (1939) - Krammer
- Those High Grey Walls (1939) - Redlands
- Fast and Furious (1939) - Ed Connors
- Slightly Honorable (1939) - Pete Godena
- Strange Cargo (1940) - Marfeu
- Rangers of Fortune (1940) - Tod Shelby
- So You Won't Talk (1940) - Bugs Linaker
- Ziegfeld Girl (1941) - Nick Capalini
- Ship Ahoy (1942) - Pietro Polesi
- The Desperadoes (1943) - Jack Lester
- Northern Pursuit (1943) - Tom Dagor
- Maisie Goes to Reno (1944) - J.E. Clave
- One Body Too Many (1944) - Morton Gellman - Attorney
- Allotment Wives (1945) - Spike Malone
- Crime Doctor's Man Hunt (1946) - Waldo
- The Lone Wolf in Mexico (1947) - Leon Dumont
- Monsieur Verdoux (1947) - Prefect of Police (as Bernard J. Nedell)
- Albuquerque (1948) - Sheriff Ed Linton (as Bernard J. Nedell)
- The Loves of Carmen (1948) - Pablo
- Hickey & Boggs (1972) - Used Car Salesman
