= Lena Rivers (1910 film) =

1910 film

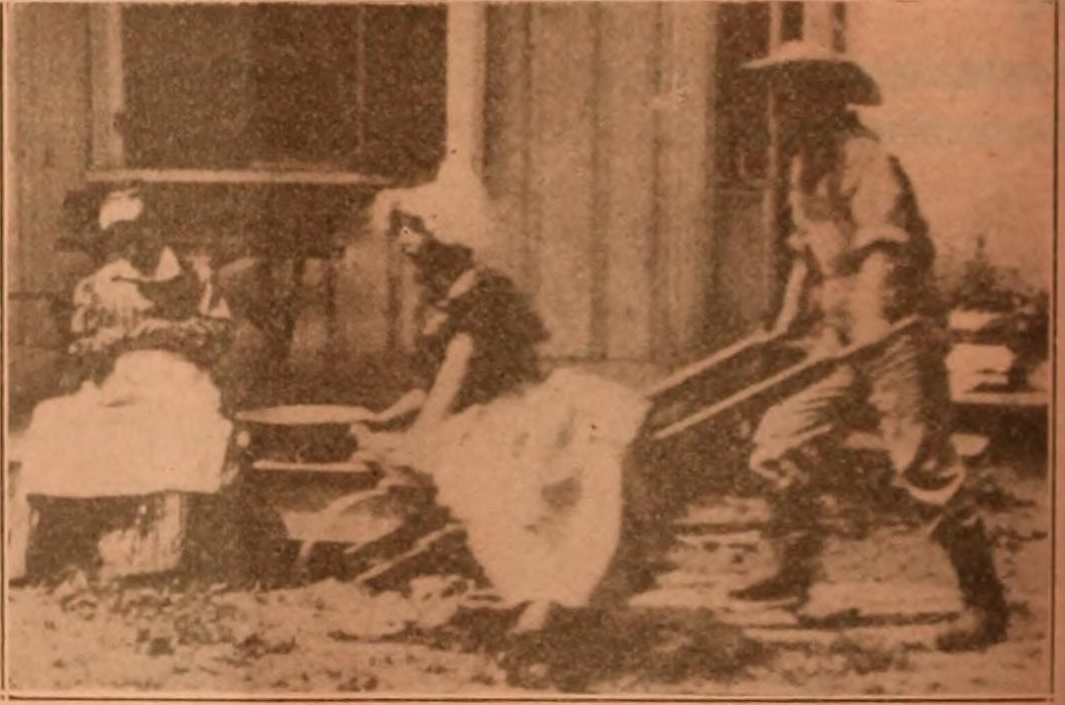
- A surviving film still
- Produced by: Thanhouser Company
- Release date: August 12, 1910
- Country: United States
- Languages: Silent film English intertitles

Lena Rivers is a 1910 American silent short drama produced by the Thanhouser Company. The film follows a young woman who leaves home to search for employment and becoming married to a wealthy man, but the marriage is kept secret. The husband is arrested by mistake and by the time he is freed, his wife and child depart and he believes them dead. The young woman entrusts her baby, Lena, to her mother before her death. At age 16, Lena goes to the city is visited by her father, but the relationship is only known when he sees a picture of her mother in her locket. The film was an adaptation of Mary Jane Holmes' 1856 novel Lena Rivers and was released on August 12, 1910. It had a wide national release and received positive reviews from critics.

== Plot ==
Though the film is presumed lost, a synopsis survives in The Moving Picture World from August 13, 1910. It states: "At the opening of the play, Granny Nichols' only daughter is leaving the farm to go to the city in search of employment. We next find her in the city, married to a wealthy man who has forbidden her to make their marriage public as he is afraid his family will object. One day, after a year of happy married life, the husband leaves his wife and baby daughter to go downtown on business. Through a case of mistaken identity, he is arrested, and before he can prove his innocence, to the satisfaction of the police, his wife - believing him to have deserted her - takes her baby and returns to her mother. The husband, upon regaining his freedom and returning home, finds only a note from his wife saying that he will never see her or the baby again. He mourns his loved ones as dead, thinking that his wife left him contemplating the death of herself and her child. The mother and child return to the farm and there, with her dying breath, the mother entrusts baby Lena to the care of Granny Nichols. Here, on the farm, Lena grows to womanhood never knowing her father's name. When Lena is 16 her Uncle John decides to take his mother to live with him in the city. Granny refuses to leave without Lena, so she also moves to Uncle John's home. In the meantime, Lena's father is a frequent visitor to the home of Uncle John, whom he little thinks is any relation to his dead wife. Here he meets Lena, and espying a locket containing the picture of her mother, which she wears around her neck, recognizes her as his daughter. Not only this but lucky Lena is enabled to marry the man she loves."

== Cast ==
- Violet Heming
- Anna Rosemond
- Frank H. Crane

== Production ==
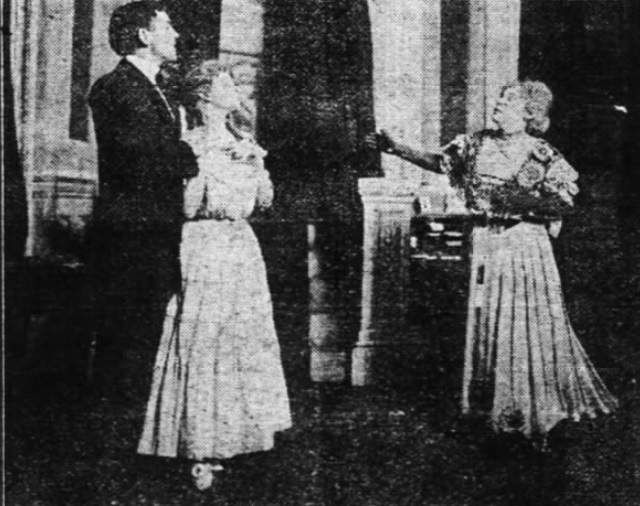
A photo of the 1907 play adaptation produced by Blanche Crozier.

The story for the production is an adaptation of Mary Jane Holmes' 1856 novel Lena Rivers. The novel was very popular and reprinted numerous times by 1900. According to The Atlanta Constitution, the theater stage productions had recently been adapted for the old work in June 1910. Though newspapers records show the appearance of a stage adaptation by winter 1906. The writer of the adapted scenario is unknown, but it was most likely Lloyd Lonergan. He was an experienced newspaperman employed by The New York Evening World while writing scripts for the Thanhouser productions. The Thanhouser Company adaptation is the first film adaptation of the book.

The film director is unknown, but it may have been Barry O'Neil. Film historian Q. David Bowers does not attribute a cameraman for this production, but at least two possible candidates exist. Blair Smith was the first cameraman of the Thanhouser company, but he was soon joined by Carl Louis Gregory who had years of experience as a still and motion picture photographer. The role of the cameraman was uncredited in 1910 productions. Though the roles of the leading players are unknown, it is likely that numerous other character roles and persons appeared in the film. Bowers states that most of the credits are fragmentary for 1910 Thanhouser productions. The cast includes both leading ladies of the company, Anna Rosemond and Violet Heming. The other known credit, Frank H. Crane was a leading male actor of the company. Bowers states that most of the credits are fragmentary for 1910 Thanhouser productions.

== Release and reception ==
The single reel drama, approximately 1,000 feet long, was released on August 12, 1910. The film had a wide national release, with theater advertisements appearing in Pennsylvania, Minnesota, Washington D. C., Washington state, and North Carolina. Some advertisements were ambiguous in whether or not the picture of the play was being performed, as one Bell Theatre advertisement shows.

The one reel format was very restrictive in terms of allowing complex plots to be told while still being showing action in the production. The release of St. Elmo on March 22, 1910 was the first adaptation and second film to be released by the Thanhouser Company. The film was reviewed by critics to be too reliant on the use of inter-titles to tell the story. The company's adaptation of The Winter's Tale would require foreknowledge of the plot to understand the film, but some theaters employed aids to inform the audience of such productions By the adaptation of Uncle Tom's Cabin the coherency in the story was praised by critics, but this story was both popular and well-known subject. The Moving Picture World review provides specific insight to the Thanhouser adaptation's ability to convey the story to audiences: "To those who have read Lena Rivers with pleasure the picture will be more than ordinarily entertaining. To those who have not read the story the film presents a narrative not without its interest in offering a quarter hour's diversion well worthwhile." The New York Dramatic Mirror would commend the picture for its acting and also confirm the adaptations coherency, "The well-known novel is adapted for a film story with considerable success in this picture. The story is clear and not too complicated, although the film covers all the essential points of the written story."

== See also ==
- List of American films of 1910
