= James Kyrle MacCurdy =

American actor and playwright

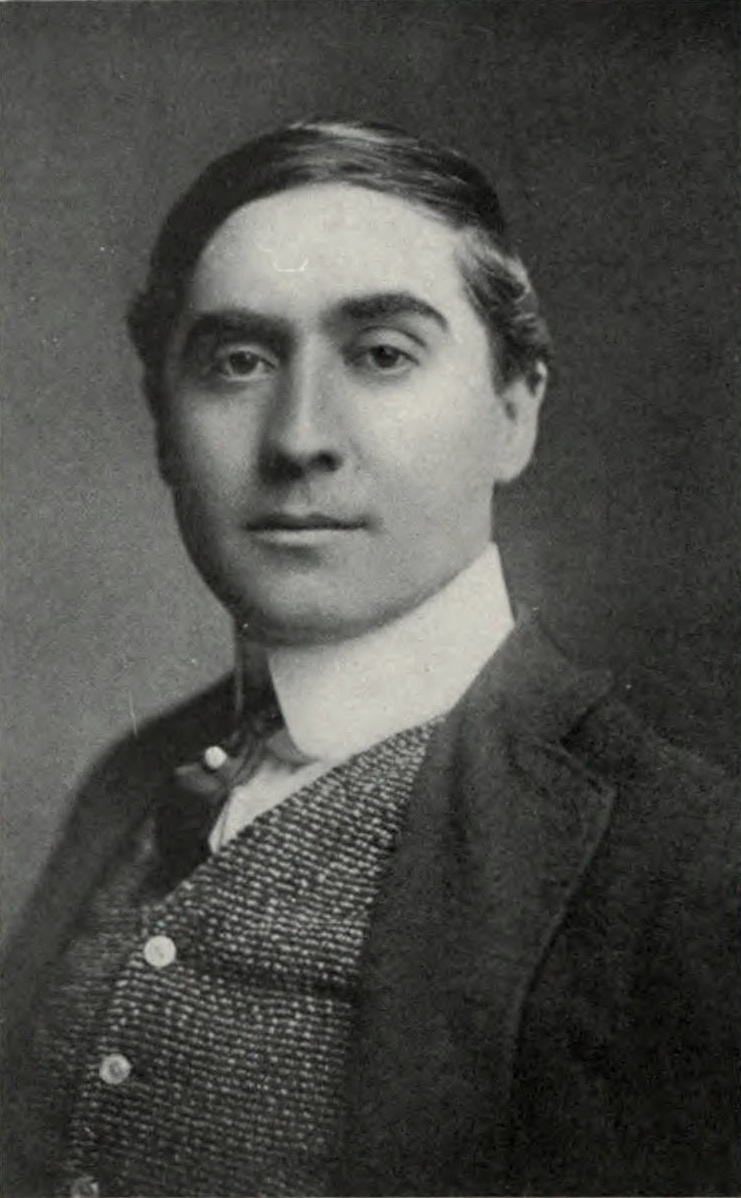
James Kyrle MacCurdy

James Kyrle MacCurdy (May 20, 1875 – December, 1923) was an American theater actor and playwright. In 1907 he wrote Yankee Doodle Detective. He wrote the 1915 play A Little Girl in the Big City that was made into the 1925 silent film A Little Girl in a Big City. He also wrote the 1917 play Broken Hearts of Broadway that was made into the 1923 silent film Broken Hearts of Broadway produced and directed by Irving Cummings and starring Colleen Moore. He also wrote and performed in The Old Clothes Man and Pedro, the Italian.

He was born and raised in Stockton, California. He acted for stock companies on the west coast then moved east and performed as the principal actor in Augustin Daly's comedy A Night Off. He then worked for the Thanhouser Company. He was married to the actress Kate Woods Fiske, and lived in Brentwood, New York. He was found dead in his Hollywood home on December 17, 1923, due to accidental asphyxiation from a gas heater (initially reported as a suicide). The Los Angeles Record reported that newspapers in his room indicated he had died on December 7 or 8. His obituary in Variety gives a death date of December 5, while his death certificate states the date as "about December 12".
