= Irma Harrison =

American film actress

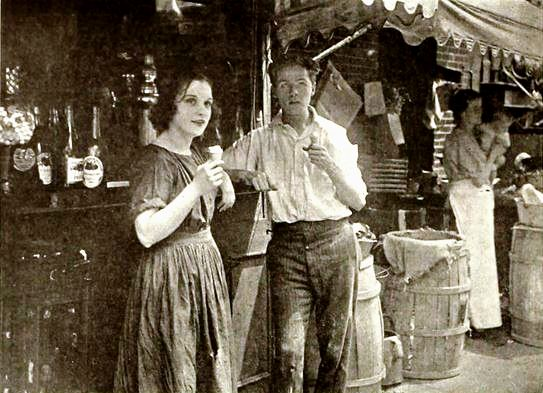
- Harrison (left) with Gareth Hughes, 1919
- Born: February 24, 1903; New Orleans, Louisiana, U.S.
- Died: January 22, 1975 (aged 71); Los Angeles, California, U.S.
- Occupation: Film actress

Irma Harrison (February 24, 1903 – January 22, 1975) was an American film actress. She starred in the films Love's Penalty (1921) and The Yellowback (1929).

Virginia Flohri sang a song she acted out as Toots in the 1929 film Alibi. She performed wearing burnt cork (blackface) in D. W. Griffith's 1922 film One Exciting Night.

== Filmography ==
- The Red Viper (1919) as Yolanda Kosloff
- The Fighting Kentuckians
- Love's Penalty (1921) as Sally Clayton
- The Daughter of Devil Dan (1921)
- One Exciting Night (1922) as The Colored Maid
- His Darker Self (1924) as Darktown's Cleopatra
- For Woman's Favor (1924) as The Lamb
- Lena Rivers (1925) as Anne Nichols
- Lilies of the Streets (1925) as Margy Hopkins
- Alibi (1929) as Toots
- The Yellowback (1929) as Elsie Loisel
- Dad's Day (1929)
- Vengeance (1930) as Nidia
