= The Clown (1927 film) =

1927 silent crime drama film

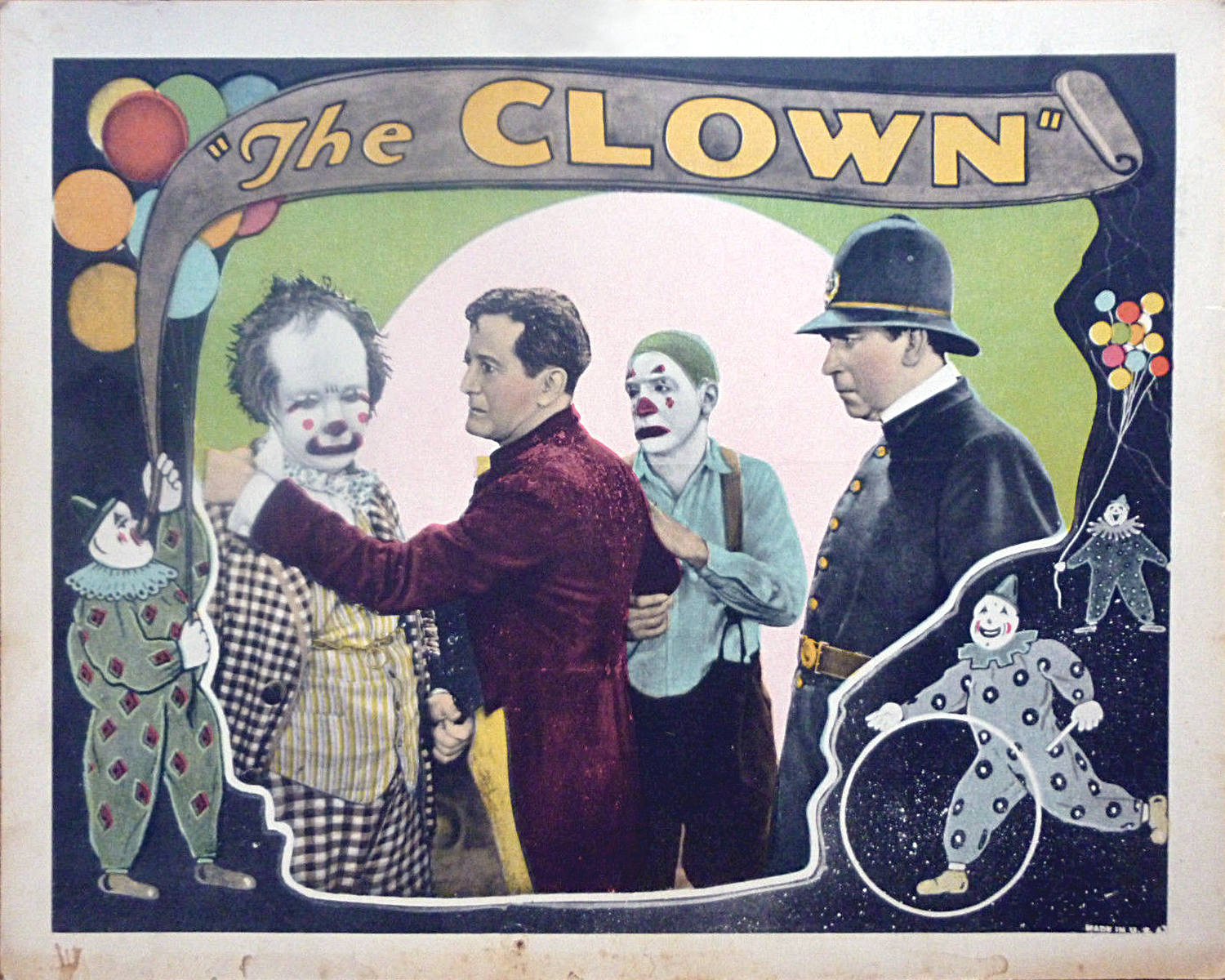
- Lobby card, actor in the red robe is William V. Mong
- Directed by: William James Craft
- Written by: Dorothy Howell (story); Harry O. Hoyt
- Produced by: Harry Cohn
- Starring: Dorothy Revier; William V. Mong; Johnnie Walker
- Cinematography: Norbert Brodine
- Distributed by: Columbia Pictures; FBO (Great Britain)
- Release date: December 12, 1927
- Running time: 57 minutes; 6 reels
- Country: United States
- Language: Silent (English intertitles)

The Clown is a 1927 American silent crime drama film directed by William James Craft and produced and distributed by Columbia Pictures. It stars Dorothy Revier, Johnnie Walker, and William V. Mong.

The film is preserved in an Italian archive and the Library of Congress.

== Cast ==
- Dorothy Revier as Fanchon
- Johnnie Walker as Bob Stone
- William V. Mong as Albert Wells
- John Miljan as Bert Colton
- Barbara Tennant as Corinne
- Charlotte Walker
