= Bachelor Apartments =

1921 film

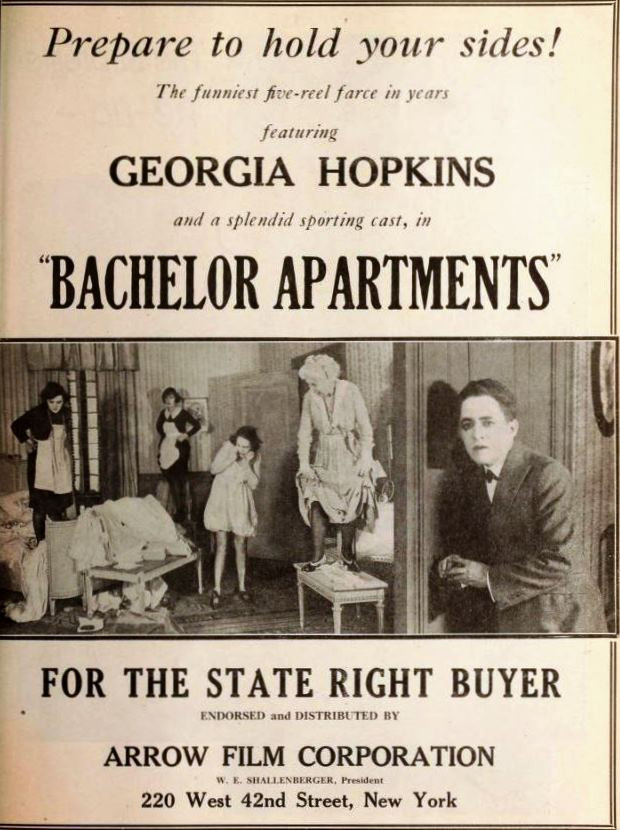
- Directed by: Johnnie Walker
- Written by: Walter R. Hall
- Edited by: Joseph Farnham
- Production company: Georgia Hopkins Picture Company
- Distributed by: Arrow Film Corporation
- Release date: May 1921
- Running time: 50 minutes
- Country: United States
- Languages: Silent; English intertitles

Bachelor Apartments is a 1921 American silent comedy film directed by Johnnie Walker. It was distributed by the Arrow Film Corporation.

== Plot ==
Faced with the choice of either getting married or getting a job, I. O. Underwood chooses the former. Aided by his realtor buddy, Bert Morely, he sublets his apartment and has his trunk sent to the home of fiancée June Shelton, whose father has little use for his daughter's ne'er-do-well suitor. In the elder Shelton's absence, Underwood moves the trunk into his room and gets ready for his bachelor party. Suitably attired, Underwood attends the event, gets falling-down drunk and, as a result, completely forgets having sublet his apartment, now occupied by the likewise marriage-minded Pearl Thorpe and her father Howard, who, like Mr. Shelton, is none too impressed with his offspring's prospective spouse. When the inebriated Underwood—never having previously met the Thorpes—staggers into his old bedroom unannounced, the understandably terrified Miss Thorpe screams for help. Rushing to her room, Mr. Thorpe mistakenly believes he has discovered his daughter's lover and now insists that the two be married immediately.

All but dragged to the altar the following morning, the mismatched pair's deux ex machina comes in the form of an exceedingly fortuitous set of coincidences. Not only does the nearest available altar happen to be the same one at which Miss Shelton, dressed in white, awaits Underwood; shortly thereafter, the arrival of Miss Thorpe's actual beau brings about the film's double wedding denouement, thus bringing to an end Underwood's troublesome "bachelor apartments."

== Cast ==
- Georgia Hopkins as June Shelton
- Fred Howard as I.O. Underwood
- George Dupree as Thomas Shelton
- Zadee Burbank as Mrs. Shelton
- George Reynolds as Bert Morely
- Edward M. Favor as Howard Thorpe
- Eva Gordon as Pearl Thorpe
- Ruby Davis as Suzette
- Edward Boulden as Harold Wright
- Joseph Donohue as An Expressman
- Bernard Nedell as Janitor

== Preservation ==
With no holdings located in archives, Bachelor Apartments is considered a lost film.

== Bibliography ==
- Connelly, Robert B. The Silents: Silent Feature Films, 1910-36, Volume 40, Issue 2. December Press, 1998.
