= The Jolt (film) =

1921 film

- Directed by: George Marshall
- Written by: John Stone; George Marshall
- Produced by: William Fox
- Starring: Edna Murphy; Johnnie Walker; Raymond McKee
- Cinematography: Jack MacKenzie
- Production company: Fox Film Corporation
- Distributed by: Fox Film Corporation
- Release date: November 20, 1921
- Running time: 50 minutes
- Country: United States
- Languages: Silent; English intertitles

The Jolt is a 1921 American silent drama film directed by George Marshall and starring Edna Murphy, Johnnie Walker and Raymond McKee.

== Plot ==
According to a film magazine, "Johnnie Stanton, while sojourning in France with the A.E.F., marries Georgette and together they return to a little flat in New York, where a welcome party is arranged by neighbors. Limur, a crook and former acquaintance of Johnnie's, appears at the party but states he is "going straight" and will help Johnnie. When Johnnie is unable to obtain work, Limur tells Georgette he will give him a job and forthwith Johnnie goes to see Limur. In his absence Nolan, an overseas soldier, calls at the flat and informs Georgette that his colonel has a job for Johnnie. Limur hands Johnnie a roll of bills and asks him to steal some valuable papers from the Colonel's safe. He refuses but later, when reminded of Georgette's needs, consents. At the house he is discovered by Nolan, who agrees to hush he matter up, but the "lookout" enters and shoots Nolan and gets away with the papers. Johnnie is accused of the shooting, but is vindicated by Nolan and the thieves are caught after a bitter chase over housetops."

== Cast ==
- Edna Murphy as Georgette
- Johnnie Walker as Johnnie Stanton
- Raymond McKee as Terence Nolan
- Albert Prisco as Jerry Limur
- Bertram Anderson-Smith as Colonel Anderson
- Clarence Wilson as Georgette's Father
- Lule Warrenton as Georgette's Mother

== Censorship ==
Before The Jolt could be exhibited in Kansas, the Kansas Board of Review required the elimination of all scenes and titles in reel 5 relating to a soldier attempting to put a diaper on a baby by himself.

== Bibliography ==
- Connelly, Robert B. The Silents: Silent Feature Films, 1910-36, Volume 40, Issue 2. December Press, 1998.
- Munden, Kenneth White. The American Film Institute Catalog of Motion Pictures Produced in the United States, Part 1. University of California Press, 1997.
- Solomon, Aubrey. The Fox Film Corporation, 1915-1935: A History and Filmography. McFarland, 2011.
