= Lena Rivers (1925 film) =

1925 film

- Directed by: Whitman Bennett
- Written by: Dana Rush
- Based on: Lena Rivers by Mary Jane Holmes
- Produced by: Chord Pictures
- Starring: Gladys Hulette; Earle Williams
- Production company: Chord Pictures
- Distributed by: Arrow Film Corporation
- Release date: May 25, 1925
- Running time: 9 reels
- Country: United States
- Language: Silent (English intertitles)

Lena Rivers is a lost 1925 American silent drama film directed by Whitman Bennett and starring Earle Williams and Gladys Hulette. It is based on the novel Lena Rivers by Mary Jane Holmes.

== Plot ==
An unhappy woman falls for a man far above her station in life. To further exasperate her torment, she learns that her own father is the stepfather of the man she desires.

== Cast ==
- Earle Williams as Henry Rivers Graham
- Johnnie Walker as Durward Belmont (credited as Johnny Walker)
- Gladys Hulette as Lena Rivers
- Edna Murphy as Carrie Nichols
- Marcia Harris as Granny Nichols
- Doris Rankin as Mathilde Nichols
- Irma Harrison as Anne Nichols
- Frank Sheridan as Henry Rivers Graham Jr.
- Herman Lieb as Captain Atherton
- Harlan Knight as The Old Sea Dog
- Frank Andrews as Grandfather Nichols
