= Johnnie Walker (actor) =

American actor and film producer

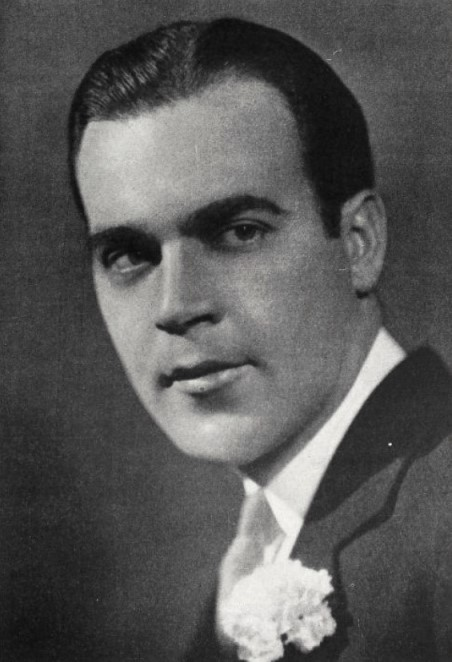
- Walker in 1925
- Born: John William Walker; January 7, 1894; New York City, New York
- Died: December 5, 1949 (aged 55); New York City, New York
- Occupations: actor, producer
- Years active: 1915–1946
- Spouses: Maude Wayne; Rena Parker

Johnnie Walker (January 7, 1894 – December 5, 1949), sometimes credited as Johnny Walker, was an American actor and producer popular from the silent era to the late 1930s. He appeared in a variety of short and feature films, including the highly successful features Captain Fly-by-Night, Over the Hill to the Poorhouse, Broken Hearts of Broadway and Old Ironsides. He began his film career in 1915.

== Background ==
The eldest son of William (1865–1940) and Johanna Walker (1871–1942), he was born John William Walker in New York City on January 7, 1894. His father was a New York City plumber. Young Walker served as a pay clerk in the United States Naval Reserve Force (December 1918-May 1919).

== Partial filmography ==
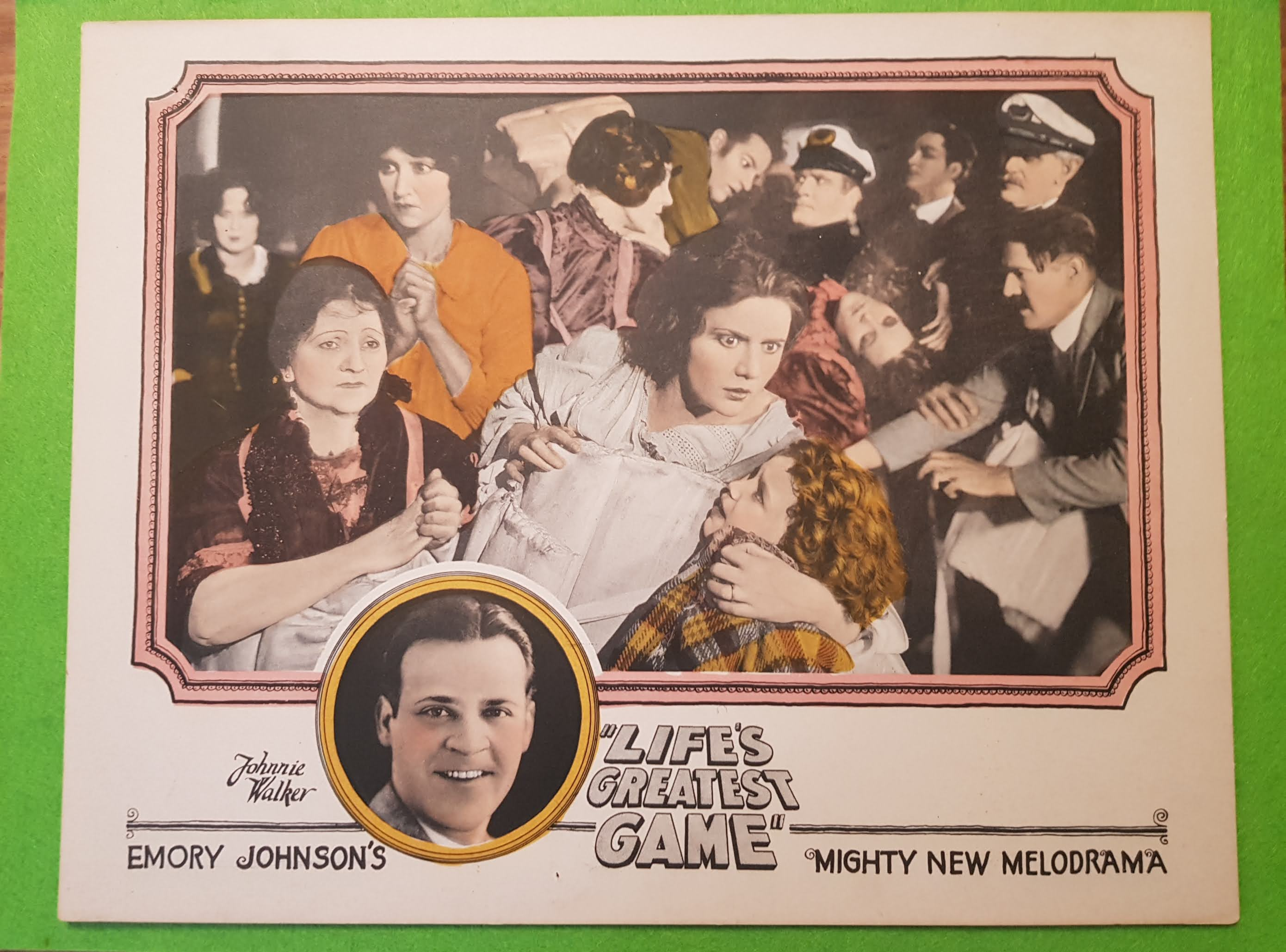
Life's Greatest Game (1924)

- Destruction (1915)
- Cohen's Luck (1915)
- On Dangerous Paths (1915)
- Greater Than Fame (1920)
- Over the Hill to the Poorhouse (1920)
- Fantômas (1920)
- Bachelor Apartments (1921)
- What Love Will Do (1921)
- Play Square (1921)
- The Jolt (1921)
- Live Wires (1921)
- Extra! Extra! (1922)
- Captain Fly-by-Night (1922)
- The Third Alarm (1922)
- The Fourth Musketeer (1923)
- Mary of the Movies (1923)
- Red Lights (1923)
- Broken Hearts of Broadway (1923)
- Children of Dust (1923)
- Fashionable Fakers (1923)
- The Mailman (1923)
- Wine of Youth (1924)
- Life's Greatest Game (1924)
- Galloping Hoofs (1924)
- The Mad Dancer (1925)
- Lena Rivers (1925)
- The Scarlet West (1925)
- Lilies of the Streets (1925)
- The Reckless Sex (1925)
- Children of the Whirlwind (1925)
- The Earth Woman (1926)
- Lightning Reporter (1926)
- Morganson's Finish (1926)
- Transcontinental Limited (1926)
- Honesty – The Best Policy (1926)
- Fangs of Justice (1926)
- Old Ironsides (1926)
- The Clown (1927)
- The Snarl of Hate (1927)
- Held by the Law (1927)
- Good Time Charley (1927)
- The Swell-Head (1927)
- The Princess on Broadway (1927)
- Wolves of the Air (1927)
- Pretty Clothes (1927)
- Rose of the Bowery (1927)
- Bare Knees (1928)
- So This Is Love? (1928)
- The Matinee Idol (1928)
- Vultures of the Sea (1928)
- Melody Man (1930)
- Ladies of Leisure (1930)
- Ladies in Love (1930)
- The Girl of the Golden West (1930)
- Enemies of the Law (1931)
- The Swellhead (1931)
