= Lilies of the Streets =

1925 film by Joseph Levering

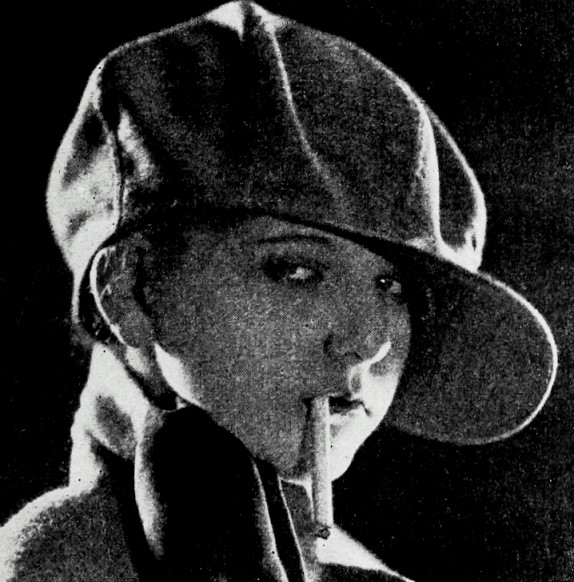
- Film still
- Directed by: Joseph Levering
- Written by: Harry Chandlee; Elizabeth J. Monroe
- Produced by: Mary E. Hamilton
- Starring: Virginia Lee Corbin; Wheeler Oakman; Johnnie Walker
- Cinematography: Murphy Darling; Charles J. Davis; Edward Paul
- Production company: Belban Productions
- Distributed by: Film Booking Offices of America
- Release date: May 3, 1925
- Running time: 7 reels
- Country: United States
- Language: Silent (English intertitles)

Lilies of the Streets is a 1925 American silent drama film directed by Joseph Levering and starring Virginia Lee Corbin, Wheeler Oakman, and Johnnie Walker.

== Plot ==
As described in a film magazine review, Judith Lee is a young woman of indulgent parents and is allowed to have her own way. After she is arrested by mistake and dishonored by a blackmailer, and with her mother is on the verge of compromise, the blackmailer is murdered by one of his victims. Judith Lee, believing her mother is guilty, assumes the blame and is about to be convicted when her fiancé, a lawyer, obtains the confession of the real killer.

== Cast ==
- Virginia Lee Corbin as Judith Lee
- Wheeler Oakman as Frank Delmore
- Peggy Kelly as Nita Moore
- Johnnie Walker as John Harding
- Irma Harrison as Margy Hopkins
- Mary E. Hamilton as Mrs. Hamilton (herself)
- Elizabeth J. Monroe as Self (assistant to Mrs. Hamilton)
- Dorothy Cumming as Mrs. Lee
- Theodore Babcock as Mr. Lee

== Production ==
Mary E. Hamilton, a New York City police officer whose work was in the "rehabilitation of wayward girls", arranged for the creation of Belban Productions for a film in which she could appear as herself and promote police work to suppress the white slave trade. At her insistence, the plot turns on a male police officer mistakenly arresting flapper Judith for being a prostitute.

== Preservation ==
With no prints of Lilies of the Streets located in any film archives, it is a lost film.

== Bibliography ==
- Munden, Kenneth White (1997). The American Film Institute Catalog of Motion Pictures Produced in the United States, Part 1. University of California Press. ISBN 0-520-20969-9.
- Tsika, Noah (2021). Screening the Police: Film and Law Enforcement in the United States. Oxford University Press. ISBN 978-0-19-757775-2.
