= Captain Fly-by-Night =

1922 film by William K. Howard

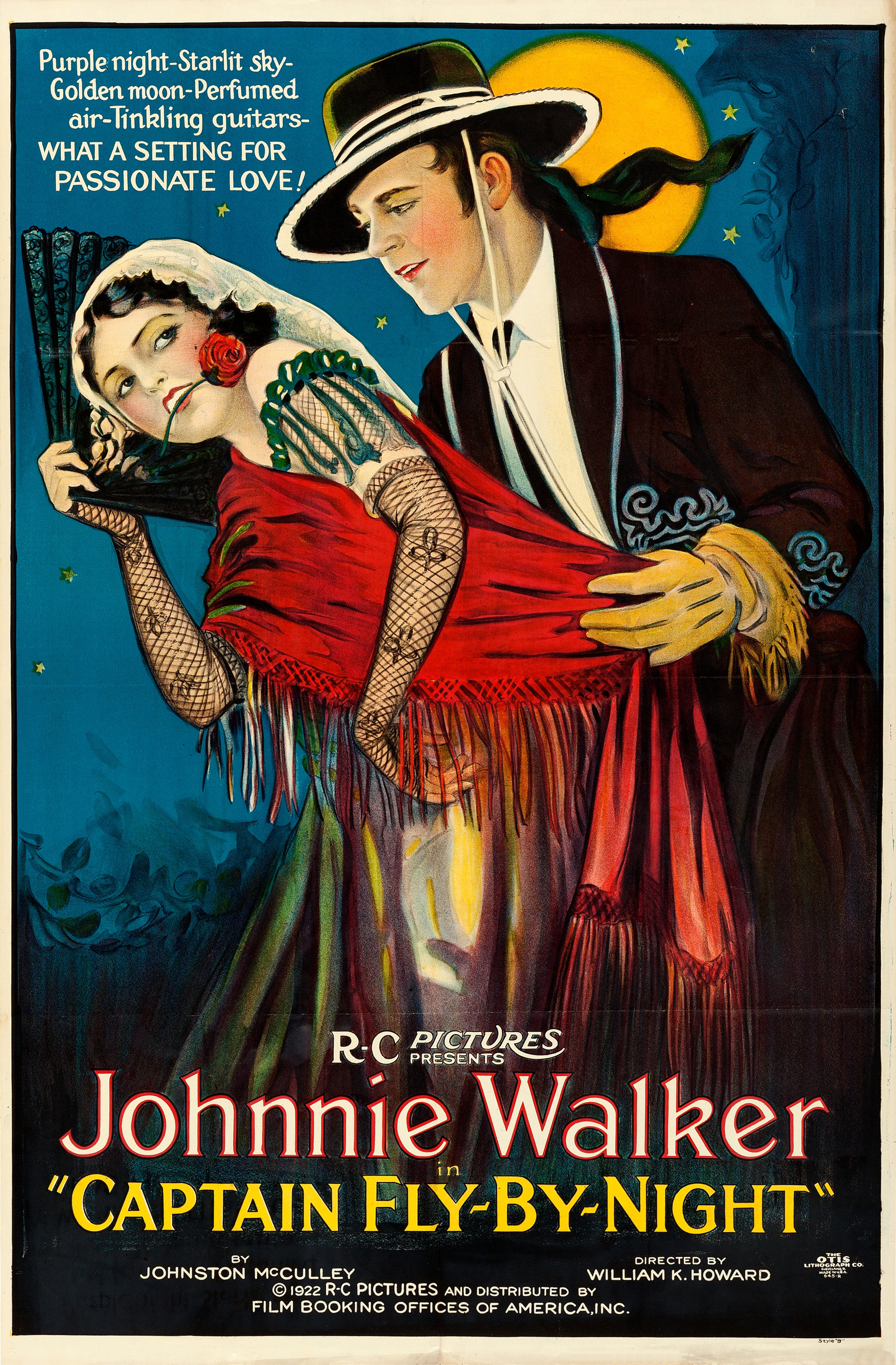
- Theatrical release poster
- Directed by: William K. Howard
- Written by: Eve Unsell
- Based on: Captain Fly-by-Night by Johnston McCulley
- Starring: Johnnie Walker; Francis McDonald; Shannon Day
- Cinematography: Lucien N. Andriot
- Edited by: J.B. Morely
- Production company: Robertson-Cole Pictures Corporation
- Distributed by: Film Booking Offices of America
- Release date: December 24, 1922
- Running time: 50 minutes
- Country: United States
- Language: Silent (English intertitles)

Captain Fly-by-Night is a 1922 American silent adventure film directed by William K. Howard and starring Johnnie Walker, Francis McDonald, and Shannon Day. Set in historic Spanish California, it was inspired by the success of the 1920 film The Mark of Zorro, and was based upon a novel of the same name by Johnston McCulley. The film has been released on DVD.

== Cast ==
- Johnnie Walker as First Stranger
- Francis McDonald as Second Stranger
- Shannon Day as Señorita Fernandez
- Eddie Gribbon as Sgt. Cassara
- Victory Bateman as Señora
- James McElhern as Padre Miguel
- Charles Stevens as Indian
- Bert Wheeler as Governor
- Fred Kelsey as Gomez
- Monte Collins as Drunk (uncredited)
- Kit Guard as Indian (uncredited)
- Noble Johnson as Indian (uncredited)

== Bibliography ==
- Munden, Kenneth White. The American Film Institute Catalog of Motion Pictures Produced in the United States, Part 1. University of California Press, 1997.
