= Shadows (1931 film) =

1931 film

- Directed by: Alexander Esway
- Written by: Rodney Ackland; Frank Miller
- Produced by: Alexander Esway
- Starring: Jacqueline Logan; Bernard Nedell; Gordon Harker; Molly Lamont
- Production company: British International Pictures
- Distributed by: First National-Pathé Pictures
- Release date: 17 August 1931
- Running time: 57 minutes
- Country: United Kingdom
- Language: English

Shadows (also known as Press Gang and My Wife's Family) is a 1931 British crime film directed and produced by Alexander Esway and starring Jacqueline Logan, Bernard Nedell and Gordon Harker. It was written by Rodney Ackland and Frank Miller, and made as a quota quickie by British International Pictures.

== Plot ==
Peter Verity, the estranged son of a newspaper owner, returns to his father's good favour by unmasking a gang of criminals.

== Cast ==
- Jacqueline Logan as Fay Melville
- Bernard Nedell as Press Rawlinson
- Gordon Harker as Earole
- Derrick De Marney as Peter
- Molly Lamont as Jill Dexter
- D. A. Clarke-Smith as Gruhn
- Wally Patch as Cripps
- Mary Clare as Lily
- Mark Lester as Herb
- Roy Emerton as Captain

== Reception ==
Film Weekly wrote: "A weak story provents interest from becoming more than lukewarm, and undistinguished direction does not help it at all. Bernard Nedell, as usual, gives a really capable performance but the rest of the cast are no more than average."

Kine Weekly wrote: "A first quality cast, even in small parts, and careful direction make a good film out of a story that is only moderate. As an underworld play, however, it is restrained, and maintains interest, while there are many good touches in working out the details."

The Daily Film Renter wrote: "This melodramatic story is never at any time convincing, and it is a sad sight to see artistes such as Bernard Nedell, Jacqueline Logan, Gordon Harker and Mary Clare wasted in a subject of this kind. The direction of Mr. Alexander Esway is altogether uninspired. Shadows is a film that may please uncritical audiences, but it is decidedly unlikely to give much entertainment to more sophisticated patrons who expect something much better today."
