= The Matinee Idol (1928 film) =

1928 film by Frank Capra

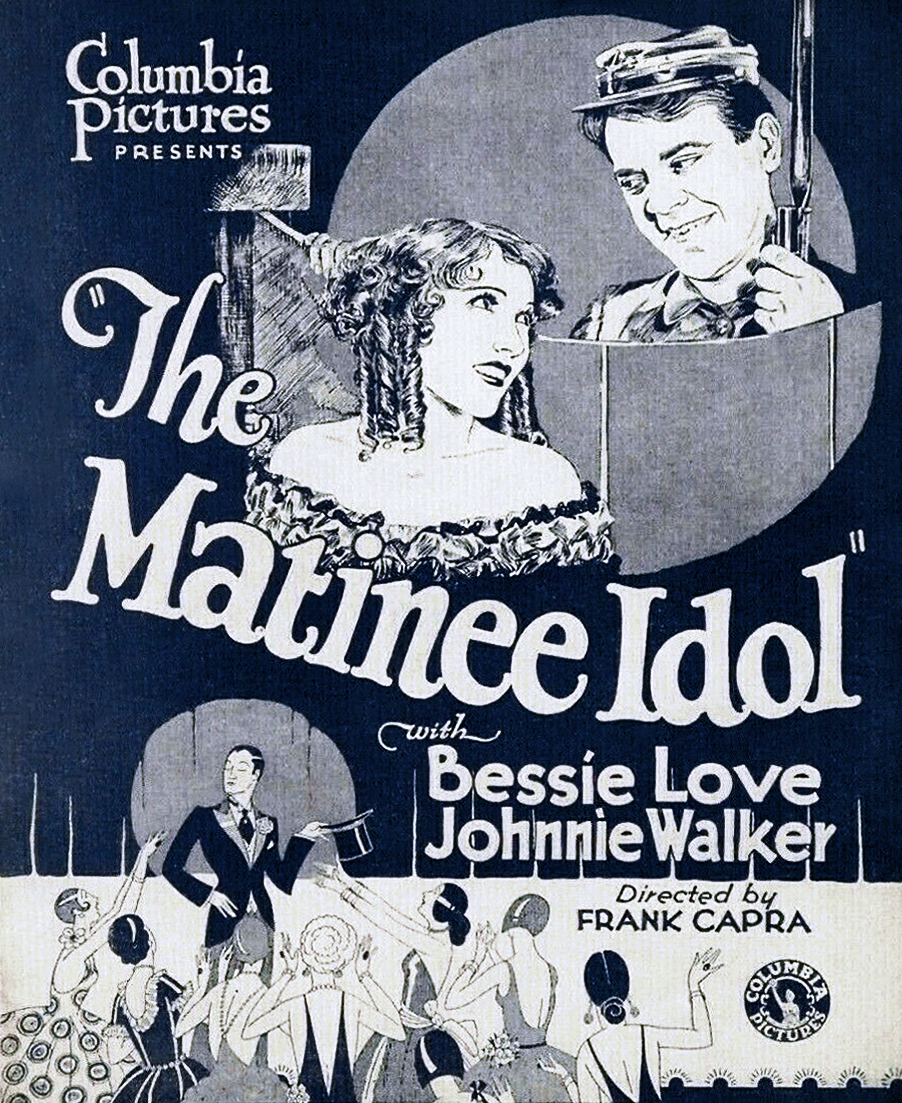
- Handbill
- Directed by: Frank Capra
- Written by: Elmer Harris (adaptation); Peter Milne (continuity)
- Based on: "Come Back to Aaron" by Robert Lord and Ernest S. Pagano
- Produced by: Frank Capra; Harry Cohn
- Starring: Bessie Love; Johnnie Walker
- Cinematography: Philip Tannura
- Edited by: Arthur Roberts
- Production company: Columbia Pictures
- Distributed by: Columbia Pictures
- Release date: March 14, 1928 (U.S.)
- Running time: 66 minutes (original); 56 minutes (restored)
- Country: United States
- Language: Silent (English intertitles)

The Matinee Idol is a 1928 American silent comedy-drama film directed by Frank Capra, and starring Bessie Love and Johnnie Walker. It was produced and distributed by Columbia Pictures.

Prints are in the archives of the Cinémathèque Française and Cineteca di Bologna. The film has been restored. The Academy Film Archive preserved The Matinee Idol in 1997.

== Plot ==
Surviving film

Don Wilson, a famous blackface comedian, is preparing to headline a new show. Arnold Wingate, his manager, persuades him to take a weekend off in the country. When their car breaks down, they go off in search of a mechanic.

Don happens upon a ramshackle traveling theatrical stock company run by Jasper Bolivar and his daughter Ginger. One of the actors has quit, so Ginger is holding an audition. When Don asks the hopefuls in line about a garage, Ginger mistakes him for one of the applicants and chooses him as the best of a bad lot. Amused (and attracted to Ginger), he accepts the job, giving his name as "Harry Mann". Playing a dying Union soldier, Don has one line ("I love you.") and gets kissed by Ginger's character.

The show, an American Civil War melodrama, is terribly amateurish, but the audience does not know any better and applauds appreciatively. Don's friends attend the show and laugh, particularly at his hijinks. (Don repeats his line several times, forcing Ginger to kiss him over and over again.) Afterward, Ginger fires him for his bad acting.

Wingate has an idea; he signs the company for his Broadway show as a comedy act, though the Bolivars and the rest of the actors are deceived into believing their play has been appreciated. Don has Wingate stipulate that the entire cast be included, so Ginger reluctantly rehires him. He insists on a raise.

During rehearsals, Don maintains his disguise by wearing blackface. Even so, he is nearly caught out by Ginger; hurriedly putting on a costume to hide his face, Don has to invent a masquerade party as a reason, and invites her and her troupe to attend. During the party, he tries to seduce her. When she rejects him, he is pleased, certain that she has feelings for his alter-ego.

On opening night, Don has second thoughts about the humiliation the Bolivar troupe is about to face, but it is too late to do anything about it. When "Harry Mann" cannot be found, Don offers to take his place. All goes as Wingate had anticipated; the audience laughs wildly, as the confused actors continue performing. At the end, Ginger finally realizes what is going on and berates the audience, then walks out into the rain. When Don follows to console her, the rain washes away his makeup and reveals his true identity.

Ginger and her father take their production back on the road. A contrite Don shows up at the audition for a replacement actor. Though Ginger at first turns away from him, she then leads him into the tent, where they embrace.

== Cast ==
- Bessie Love as Ginger Bolivar
- Johnnie Walker as Don Wilson, a.k.a. "Harry Mann"
- Ernest Hilliard as Arnold Wingate
- Lionel Belmore as Jasper Bolivar
- David Mir as Eric Barrymaine

== Production ==
In early February 1928, Columbia Pictures announced that Bessie Love would have the female lead in the film, which had the working title of Broadway Daddies. The film was slated to begin production on February 2 with Frank Capra directing and Joe Jackson writing the continuity. Later, it was announced that Johnny Walker would co-star with Love, that Sidney D'Albrook and Lionel Belmore had been added to the cast, and that the name of the project had changed from Broadway Daddies to The Matinee Idol.

== Release and rediscovery ==
In France, the film was released as Bessie à Broadway, as star Bessie Love was a strong box-office draw there. The film was rediscovered in 1992 when an old film lab in southern France went out of business and film historians found a print of the French version at the Cinémathèque Française. The restored film received its television premiere on Turner Classic Movies on June 7, 1997.

== Reception ==
The Washington Post's Rita Kempley reviewed the restored film in 1997, describing it as "a none-too-subtle silent comedy" and "early, ultra-schmaltzy kernel of Capra-corn" that demonstrates Capra's early themes of class struggle and his background as "a gag man for the Mack Sennett and Hal Roach studios." Kempley noted that the film "manages to bash women, African Americans, homosexuals and the disabled all in only 56 minutes," reflecting what she called "America's politically incorrect past."

== See also ==
- Matinee idol
- Racism in early American film
