= Wolves of the Air =

1927 film

- Directed by: Francis Ford
- Written by: Francis Ford; James Bell Smith
- Starring: Johnnie Walker; Lois Boyd; Maurice Costello
- Cinematography: Herbert Kirkpatrick
- Production company: Sterling Pictures
- Distributed by: Sterling Pictures
- Release date: January 22, 1927
- Running time: 15:07 minutes
- Country: United States
- Languages: Silent (English and French intertitles)

Wolves of the Air is a 1927 American silent action film directed by Francis Ford and starring Johnnie Walker, Lois Boyd and Maurice Costello. It was considered a lost film until 2021 when it was retrieved in the collection of the Dordrecht Regional Archives, and is in excellent condition.

Returning from serving in World War I, Bob Warne finds that his father's airplane factory has been taken over. Getting employment at a rival factory, he enters an air race in order to win a government contract. Despite repeated attempts at sabotage he is triumphant.

== Cast ==
- Johnnie Walker as Bob Warne
- Lois Boyd as Peggy Tanner
- Maurice Costello as Bob's Father
- Mildred Harris as Marceline Manning
- Gayne Whitman as Evan Steele
- William Boyd as Jerry Tanner
- Billy Bletcher as 'Big Boy' Durkey
- Bud Jamison as 'Short-Cut' McGee

== Bibliography ==
- Paris, Michael. From the Wright Brothers to Top Gun: Aviation, Nationalism, and Popular Cinema. Manchester University Press, 1995.
