= Broken Hearts of Broadway =

1923 film by Irving Cummings

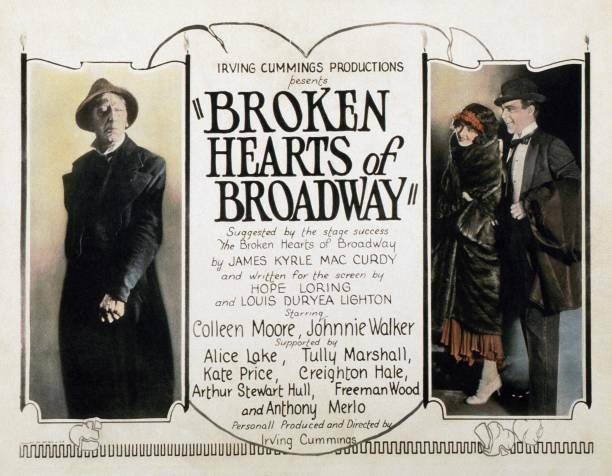
- Lobby card
- Directed by: Irving Cummings
- Written by: Louis D. Lighton; Hope Loring
- Based on: Broken Hearts of Broadway by James Kyrle McCurdy
- Produced by: Irving Cummings
- Starring: Colleen Moore; Johnnie Walker; Alice Lake
- Cinematography: James Diamond
- Production company: Irving Cummings Productions
- Distributed by: Select Pictures
- Release date: July 1923
- Running time: 81 minutes
- Country: United States
- Language: Silent (English intertitles)

Broken Hearts of Broadway is a 1923 American silent drama film produced and directed by Irving Cummings and starring Colleen Moore, Johnnie Walker, and Alice Lake. It is based on a 1917 play Broken Hearts of Broadway by James Kyrle McCurdy.

== Cast ==
- Colleen Moore as Mary Ellis
- Johnnie Walker as George Colton
- Alice Lake as Bubbles Revere
- Tully Marshall as Barney Ryan
- Kate Price as Lydia Ryan
- Creighton Hale as An Outcast
- Tony Merlo as Tony Guido (credited as Anthony Merlo)
- Arthur Stuart Hull as Barry Peale
- Freeman Wood as Frank Huntleigh

== Preservation ==
Prints of Broken Hearts of Broadway are preserved in the collections of the Library of Congress, Academy Film Archive, and Blackhawk Films.
