= Tempest and Sunshine =

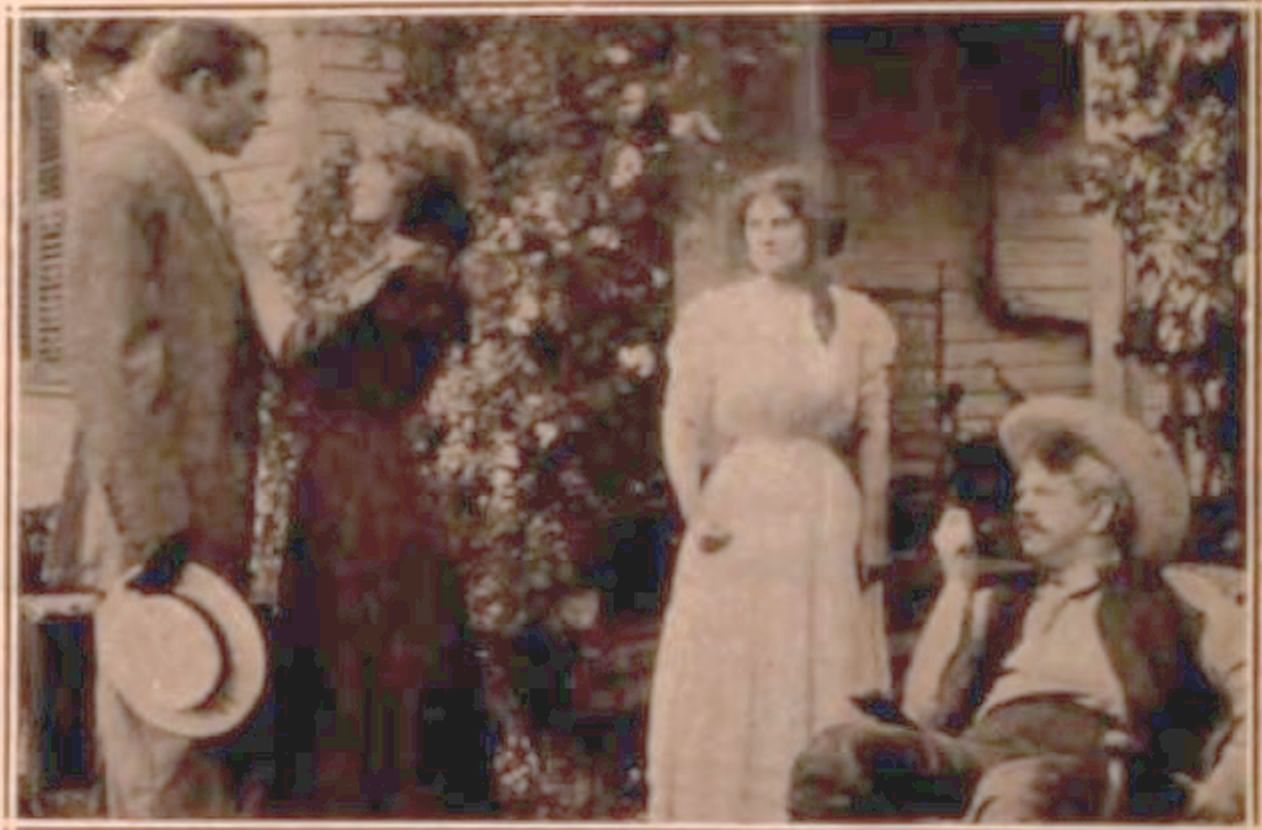
- An image still of the film.
- Produced by: Thanhouser Company
- Release date: June 28, 1910
- Country: United States
- Languages: Silent film English intertitles

Tempest and Sunshine is a 1910 American silent short drama produced by the Thanhouser Company. The film is an adaptation of Mary Jane Holmes's 1854 novel Tempest and Sunshine, and features the devious Tempest and the benevolent Sunshine being wooed by a Dr. Lacey. Tempest and Bill Jeffreys conspire against Sunshine. By intercepting the lovers' letters the doctor instead decides to marry Tempest, but Jeffreys interrupts the ceremony to reveal the conspiracy. The doctor and Sunshine are reunited. The novel was a popular subject of plays and vaudeville, but the Thanhouser adaptation appears to be the first film version for it predates the adaptations in The Complete Index to Literary Sources in Film. Released on June 28, 1910, the production received a favorable review in The Moving Picture News. The film is presumed lost.

== Plot ==
The Moving Picture World synopsis states, "Planter Middleton, of Kentucky, has two beautiful daughters. One of them is known as Tempest and the other is Sunshine, because of their different dispositions. Sunshine is wooed by Bill Jeffreys, the village postmaster, whom she does not love and rejects. Later her heart is won by young Dr. Lacey from New Orleans. Soon after they become engaged, the doctor is compelled to return to his home city on business. During his absence, Tempest, who is in love with him, conspires with Bill Jeffreys to intercept the lovers' letters. They succeed in making Julia and the doctor each think the other is untrue. The doctor, in a spirit of pique, decides to marry Tempest. Sunshine remains true, and confides to no one the sorrow that she feels. Just as Tempest and the doctor are about to be married, the ceremony is interrupted by Jeffreys, who confesses the plot — having left a sick bed to do so. The guilty ones are forgiven and the lovers reunited."

== Cast ==
The identification of the cast is uncertain, the only known credit attributed by Q. David Bowers is for Violet Heming in a leading role. According to a response in The Motion Picture Story Magazine, Anna Rosemond played the role of Tempest and Heming played the role of Sunshine. Violet Heming was the second leading lady of Thanhouser and worked for Thanhouser intermittently until her departure in the spring of 1911. Other cast members may have included the other leading players of the Thanhouser productions, possibly Frank H. Crane.

== Production ==
The story for the production is an adaptation of Mary Jane Holmes's 1854 novel Tempest and Sunshine. The story is of two sisters, the deceitful Julia, nicknamed Tempest, and her benevolent sister Fanny, nicknamed Sunshine. The writer of the adapted scenario is unknown, but it was most likely Lloyd Lonergan. Lonergan was an experienced newspaperman employed by The New York Evening World while writing scripts for the Thanhouser productions. He was the most important script writer for Thanhouser, averaging 200 scripts a year from 1910 to 1915. The film director is unknown, but it may have been Barry O'Neil. Bowers does not attribute a cameraman for this production, but two possible candidates exist. Blair Smith was the first cameraman of the Thanhouser company, but he was soon joined by Carl Louis Gregory who had years of experience as a still and motion picture photographer. The role of the cameraman was uncredited in 1910 productions.

== Release and reception ==
The single reel drama, approximately 1,020 feet long, was released on June 28, 1910. The Moving Picture News reviewed the film positively for its settings, photography and its acting. The reviewer added that the film is likely to please the audiences because of its happy ending with a wedding. The novel was a popular subject of stage productions; a production with Tom Lennon and his company was advertised to have broken many records in the 1909 season. Another production was put on by Gladys George and the Middle States Stock company in August 1910. The continued popularity of the novel would be evidenced by the future productions by other companies of the same subject with Independent Moving Pictures (IMP) making a two reel version in 1914. In 1915, Rialto for Gaumont produced another version of the work under the title Sunshine and Tempest. Other productions included a vaudeville team of "Sunshine and Tempest". These records make identifying the stage, vaudeville and different film showings difficult. Theaters specifically advertising the Thanhouser production included those in Kansas, and two theaters in Indiana. The work is sometimes omitted in large reference works, such as The Complete Index to Literary Sources in Film which includes the 1914 IMP production and a 1916 Dixie Film production. As a result, it appears that the Thanhouser production appears to be the earliest known film adaptation of the work, but it is presumed lost.

== See also ==
- List of American films of 1910
