= Lionel Belmore =

English actor (1867–1953)

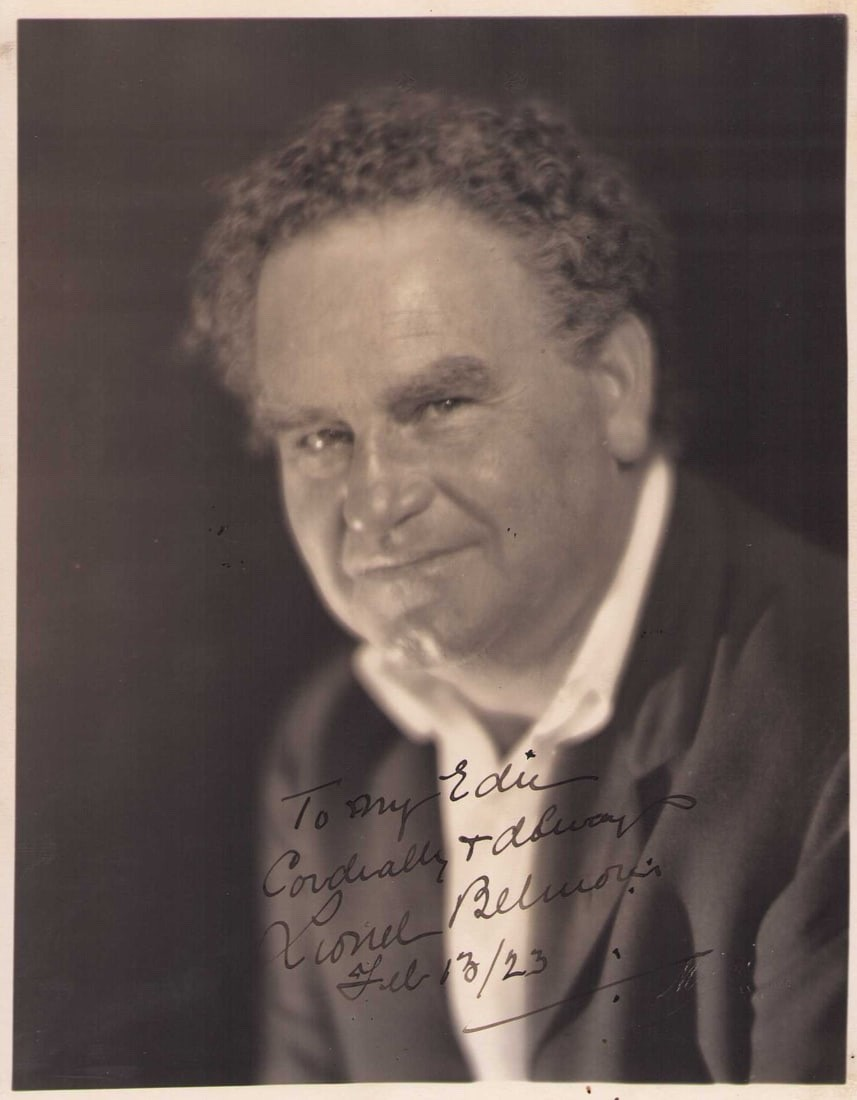
- Inscribed to Edith Hubner in 1923
- Born: 12 May 1867; Wimbledon, Surrey, England
- Died: 30 January 1953 (aged 85); Woodland Hills, Los Angeles, California
- Burial place: Valhalla Memorial Park Cemetery.
- Occupation: Actor
- Years active: 1911–1945
- Spouse: Emmeline Florence Carder
- Children: 2

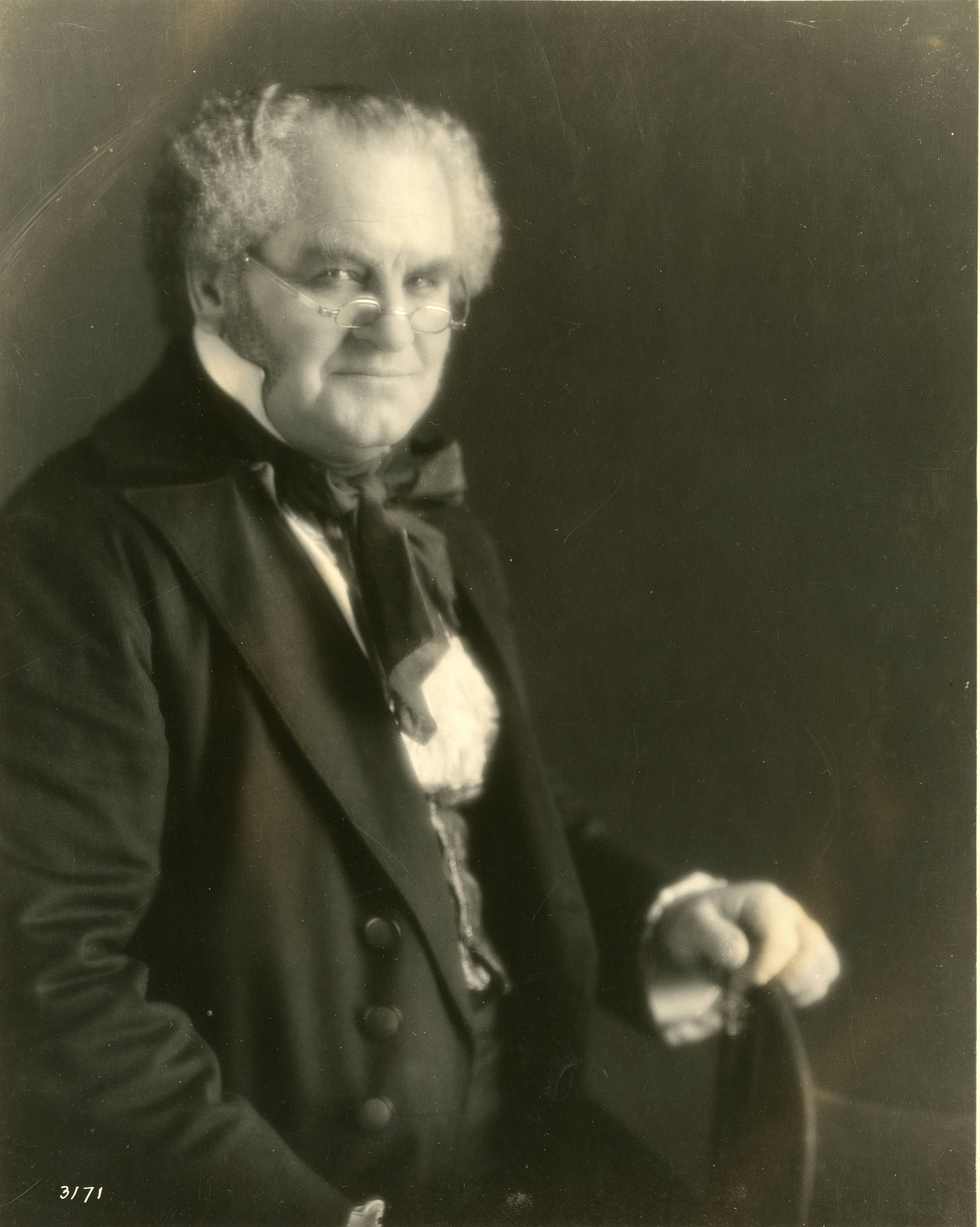
In Character (1923)

Lionel Belmore (12 May 1867 – 30 January 1953) was an English character actor and director on stage for more than a quarter of a century.

== Life and career ==
Onstage, Belmore appeared with Wilson Barrett, Sir Henry Irving, William Faversham, Lily Langtry, and other famous actors. He entered in films from 1911. In total, he had some 200 titles to his film credit. He was notable as the huffy-puffy Herr Vogel the Burgomaster in Frankenstein (1931). Belmore played bit parts in several 1930s film classics. Unusually, he was a director before he became a prolific actor. He directed from 1914 to 1920, only acting in a limited number of films, until concentrating as an actor from then on.

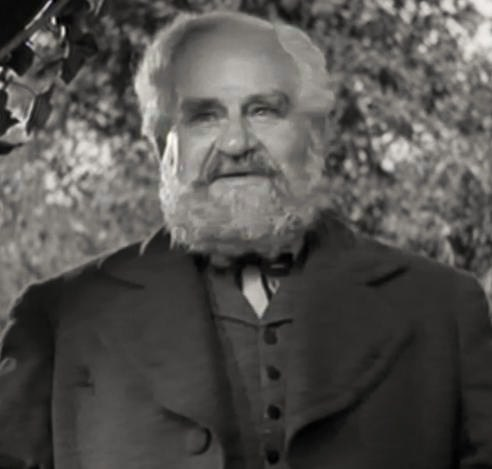
Lionel Belmore in Little Lord Fauntleroy (1936)

He was the brother of the actress Daisy Belmore (Mrs. Samuel Waxman) and the actors Herbert Belmore and Paul Belmore. He was the brother-in-law of actress Bertha Belmore. He was married to stage actress Emmeline Florence Carder and they had two daughters. Their daughter Violet had decided to follow in her father's footsteps and go into acting.

He is interred at Valhalla Memorial Park Cemetery in North Hollywood.

== Selected filmography ==
- The Greater Will (1915) - Minor Role
- In the Latin Quarter (1915, director)
- Shame (1917) - Peters
- The Beautiful Mrs. Reynolds (1918) - Gen. Israel Putnam
- His Royal Highness (1918) - Gen. Malcoff
- The Wasp (1918, director) - Brazsos
- Wanted: A Mother (1918) - Giuseppe
- Leap to Fame (1918) - Carl Hoffman
- Duds (1920) - Rosenthal
- The Strange Boarder (1920) - Jake Bloom
- Jes' Call Me Jim (1920) - Belcher
- Milestones (1920) - Richard Sibley Sr
- Madame X (1920) - M. Robert Parissard
- The Man Who Had Everything (1920) - Mark Bullway
- The Great Lover (1920) - Impresario
- Godless Men (1920) - Seaman Neighbor
- Guile of Women (1921) - Armstrong
- A Shocking Night (1921) - Bill Bradford
- Courage (1921) - Angus Ferguson
- The Sting of the Lash (1921) - Ben Ames
- Moonlight Follies (1921) - James Rutledge
- Two Minutes to Go (1921) - Her Father
- The Barnstormer (1922) - Manager
- Kindred of the Dust (1922) - The Laird of Tyee
- The World's Champion (1922) - John Burroughs
- Iron to Gold (1922) - Sheriff
- Head Over Heels (1922) - Al Wilkins
- Out of the Silent North (1922) - Andrea Vallois
- The Galloping Kid (1922) - 'Five-Notch' Arnett
- Oliver Twist (1922) - Mr. Brownlow
- The Kentucky Derby (1922) - Col. Rome Woolrich
- Enter Madame (1922) - Archimede
- Peg o' My Heart (1922) - Hawks
- Jazzmania (1923) - Baron Bolo
- Quicksands (1923) - Ring Member #8
- Within the Law (1923) - Irwin - his attorney
- Railroaded (1923) - Foster
- Three Ages (1923) - Minor Role (uncredited)
- Red Lights (1923) - Alden Murray
- Forgive and Forget (1923) - Butler
- The Meanest Man in the World (1923)
- A Lady of Quality (1924) - Sir Geoffrey Wildairs
- A Fool's Awakening (1924) - Herbert Lorington
- Try and Get It (1924) - Timothy Perrin
- A Boy of Flanders (1924) - Baas cogez
- Racing Luck (1924) - The Uncle
- The Sea Hawk (1924) - Justice Anthony Baine
- The Man Who Fights Alone (1924) - Meggs
- The Silent Watcher (1924) - Barnes, Steele's campaign manager
- Eve's Secret (1925) - Baron
- Never the Twain Shall Meet (1925) - Gaston Larrieau
- Without Mercy (1925) - Honest Tom Massingham
- The Storm Breaker (1925) - Parson
- Madame Behave (1925) - Seth Corwin
- Stop, Look and Listen (1926) - Sheriff
- The Blackbird (1926) - Music Hall Proprietor (uncredited)
- The Checkered Flag (1926) - Joel Corbin
- Shipwrecked (1926) - John Beacon
- The Lucky Fool (1926) - Mr. Bowden
- The Dice Woman (1926) - Rastillac
- Speeding Through (1926)
- Bardelys the Magnificent (1926) - Vicomte de Lavedan
- Oh Billy, Behave (1926) - Mr. Lovely
- The Return of Peter Grimm (1926) - Rev. Bartholomey
- Return of Grey Wolf (1926) - Jacques St. Claire
- The Self Starter (1926)
- Wide Open (1927)
- Winners of the Wilderness (1927) - Gov. Dinwiddie of Virginia
- The Demi-Bride (1927) - Monsieur Girard
- The Missing Link (1927) - First Mate (uncredited)
- Afraid to Love (1927) - Nobleman (uncredited)
- The King of Kings (1927) - Roman Noble
- The Tender Hour (1927) - Party Guest #2
- Topsy and Eva (1927) - Minor Role (uncredited)
- The Sunset Derby (1927) - Jack McTeague
- Roaring Fires (1927) - John D. Summers
- The Student Prince in Old Heidelberg (1927) - Stout Student (uncredited)
- Sorrell and Son (1927) - John Palfrey
- The Wife's Relations (1928) - Cyrus Dodd
- Rose-Marie (1928) - Henri Duray
- The Matinee Idol (1928) - Jasper Bolivar
- The Play Girl (1928) - The Greek Florist
- The Good-Bye Kiss (1928) - The General
- Heart Trouble (1928) - Adolph Van Housen
- The Circus Kid (1928) - Beezicks
- The Yellowback (1929) - McDougal
- Stark Mad (1929) - Amos Sewald
- The Redeeming Sin (1929) - Father Colomb
- From Headquarters (1929) - Señor Carroles
- The Unholy Night (1929) - Major Endicott
- Evidence (1929) - Innkeeper
- Condemned (1929) - Convict (uncredited)
- The Love Parade (1929) - Prime Minister
- Devil-May-Care (1929) - Innkeeper (uncredited)
- Love Comes Along (1930) - Brownie
- Playing Around (1930) - Morgan the Pirate
- The Rogue Song (1930) - Ossman
- Captain of the Guard (1930) - Colonel of Hussars
- Le spectre vert (1930) - Commandant Endicott
- Hell's Island (1930) - Monsieur Dupont
- Sweet Kitty Bellairs (1930) - Colonel Villiers
- Monte Carlo (1930) - Prince Gustav von Liebenheim
- River's End (1930) - Mountie (uncredited)
- The Boudoir Diplomat (1930) - War Minister
- One Heavenly Night (1930) - Baron Zagon
- Kiss Me Again (1931) - Cafe Manager (uncredited)
- Ten Nights in a Bar-Room (1931) - Bill, the Bartender
- Daybreak (1931) - Herr Kessner (uncredited)
- A Woman of Experience (1931) - Recruiting Speaker (uncredited)
- Alexander Hamilton (1931) - General Philip Schuyler
- Shanghaied Love (1931) - The Knitting Swede
- Frankenstein (1931) - The Burgomaster
- Safe in Hell (1931) - Judge (uncredited)
- Police Court (1932) - Uncle Al Furman
- Vanity Fair (1932) - Sir Pitt Crawley
- So Big (1932) - Reverend Dekker (uncredited)
- The Man Called Back (1932) - Mr. Cartright
- Malay Nights (1932) - Buck - Bartender
- The Sign of the Cross (1932) - Bettor of 300 Silver (uncredited)
- Cavalcade (1933) - Uncle George
- The Vampire Bat (1933) - Bürgermeister Gustave Schoen
- Oliver Twist (1933) - Bumble
- The Constant Woman (1933) - Character Man
- The Warrior's Husband (1933) - Homer
- Berkeley Square (1933) - Innkeeper (uncredited)
- Meet the Baron (1933) - Explorer with Newspaper (uncredited)
- Design for Living (1933) - Theatre Patron (uncredited)
- I Am Suzanne! (1933) - Puppeteer / Satan
- The Constant Wife (1933)
- Caravan (1934) - Station Master
- Stingaree (1934) - Governor's Second Aide (uncredited)
- Range Riders (1934) - Mike - Bartender (uncredited)
- The Count of Monte Cristo (1934) - Prison Governor
- Jane Eyre (1934) - Lord Ingram
- The Affairs of Cellini (1934) - Court Member (uncredited)
- Cleopatra (1934) - Fidius
- Red Morning (1934) - The Storekeeper
- Clive of India (1935) - Official at Reception (uncredited)
- David Copperfield (1935) - Old Bailey Warden (uncredited)
- Vanessa: Her Love Story (1935) - Will Leathwaite
- Cardinal Richelieu (1935) - Agitator #1
- Bonnie Scotland (1935) - Blacksmith
- The Three Musketeers (1935) - King and Peasant Inn Proprietor (uncredited)
- Dressed to Thrill (1935) - Pierre (uncredited)
- Mutiny on the Bounty (1935) - Innkeeper (uncredited)
- Forced Landing (1935) - Prison Warden
- Hitch Hike Lady (1935) - Mr. Harker - Green-grocer
- Mark of the Vampire (1935) - (uncredited)
- Little Lord Fauntleroy (1936) - Higgins
- One Rainy Afternoon (1936) - Stage Doorman (uncredited)
- The White Angel (1936) - Captain (uncredited)
- Mary of Scotland (1936) - Fisherman
- The Last of the Mohicans (1936) - Patroon
- Maid of Salem (1937) - Tavern Keeper
- The Prince and the Pauper (1937) - Innkeeper
- Topper (1937) - Bank Guard (uncredited)
- The Toast of New York (1937) - President of Board
- It's Love I'm After (1937) - Friar Lawrence (uncredited)
- Thoroughbreds Don't Cry (1937) - Calverton's Butler (uncredited)
- The Adventures of Robin Hood (1938) - Humility Prim (uncredited)
- If I Were King (1938) - Chief Steward (uncredited)
- Service de Luxe (1938) - Robert Wade Sr. (uncredited)
- Son of Frankenstein (1939) - Emil Lang
- The Sun Never Sets (1939) - Third Selection Board Member (uncredited)
- The Hunchback of Notre Dame (1939) - Judge at Esmeralda's Trial (uncredited)
- Rulers of the Sea (1939) - Villager (uncredited)
- Tower of London (1939) - Beacon
- My Son, My Son! (1940) - Mr. Moscrop
- Tom Brown's School Days (1940) - Tavern Keeper (uncredited)
- Diamond Frontier (1940) - Piet Bloem
- The Son of Monte Cristo (1940) - Innkeeper Hercules Snyder
- The Ghost of Frankenstein (1942) - Councillor (uncredited)
- Forever and a Day (1943) - Minor Role (scenes deleted)
- The Captain from Köpenick (completed in 1941, released in 1945) - Laughing Townsman (final film role)
