= Moonlight Follies =

1921 film

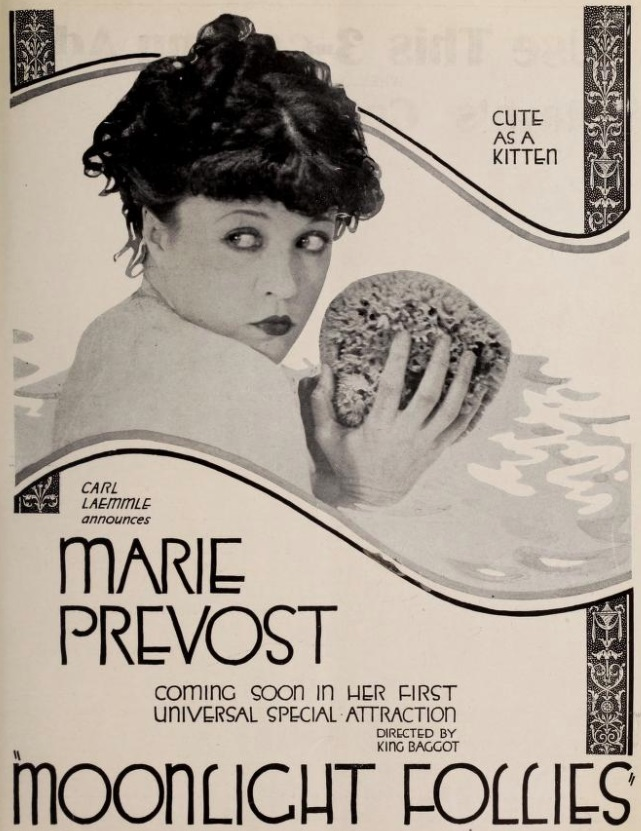
- Directed by: King Baggot
- Written by: Percival Wilde; Andrew Percival Younger
- Starring: Marie Prevost; Lionel Belmore; Marie Crisp
- Cinematography: Bert Glennon
- Production company: Universal Pictures
- Distributed by: Universal Pictures
- Release date: September 18, 1921
- Running time: 50 minutes
- Country: United States
- Languages: Silent; English intertitles

Moonlight Follies is a 1921 American silent comedy film directed by King Baggot and starring Marie Prevost, Lionel Belmore and Marie Crisp.

== Plot ==
Nan Rutledge is a young flapper who has many boys at her beck-and-call, whom she invites to midnight dances at her home. After a raucous house party, she is ordered by her father to find a husband and settle down. She immediately decides to marry the last person her father met with at random, the wealthy woman-hating Anthony Griswald. When proposed to, she accepts but then later changes her mind in front of guests. Later, Anthony abducts her and secrets her to his mountain cabin where he sends for the parson.

== Cast ==
- Marie Prevost as Nan Rutledge
- Lionel Belmore as James Rutledge
- Marie Crisp as Cissie Hallock
- George Fisher as Rene Smythe
- Clyde Fillmore as Tony Griswold

== Preservation ==
With no prints of Moonlight Follies located in any film archives, it is considered a lost film.

== Bibliography ==
- Munden, Kenneth White. The American Film Institute Catalog of Motion Pictures Produced in the United States, Part 1. University of California Press, 1997.
