= Red Lights (1923 film) =

1923 film directed by Clarence G. Badger

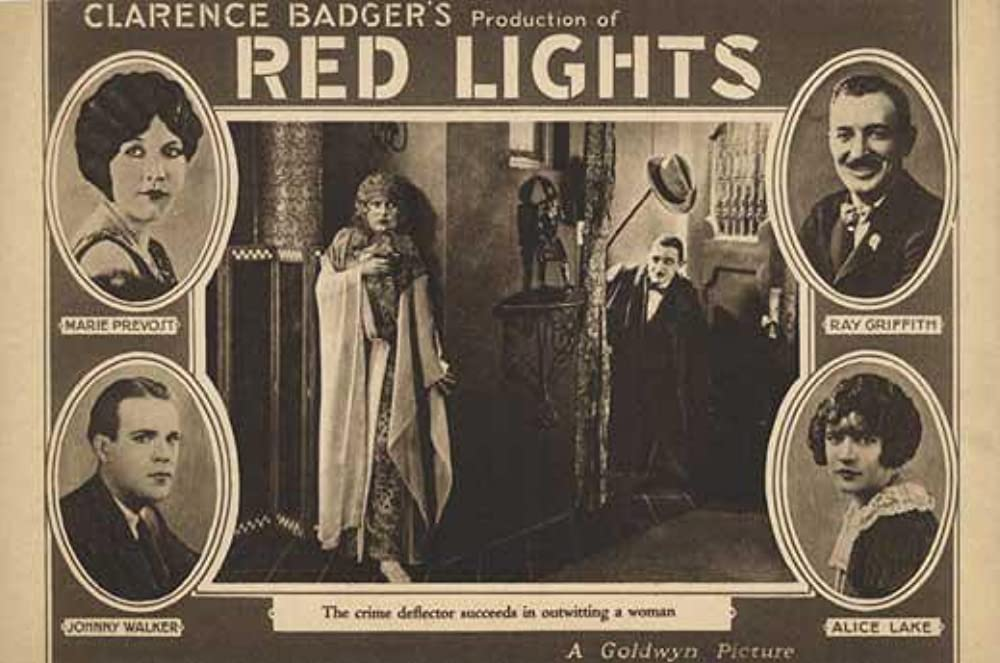
- Directed by: Clarence G. Badger
- Written by: Carey Wilson; Alice D.G. Miller
- Based on: The Rear Car; a Mystery Play ... 1926 play by Edward E. Rose
- Starring: Marie Prevost; Raymond Griffith; Johnnie Walker
- Cinematography: Rudolph J. Bergquist
- Production company: Goldwyn Pictures
- Distributed by: Goldwyn Pictures
- Release date: September 30, 1923
- Running time: 70 minutes
- Country: United States
- Languages: Silent; English intertitles

Red Lights is a 1923 American silent mystery film directed by Clarence G. Badger and starring Marie Prevost, Raymond Griffith and Johnnie Walker. The plot concerns a railroad tycoon who is about to be reunited with his daughter who was kidnapped many years ago.

== Plot ==
Most of the film takes place on a moving train. A psychic named Sheridan Scott professes to have the ability to foresee and prevent criminal acts. He agrees to help Ruth Carson, the daughter of a wealthy railroad magnate, solve a mystery regarding why flashing red lights over her head portend death for various people around her. Ruth had been kidnapped years earlier, and was later found and reunited with her father. The young heroine comes to believe her long-deceased uncle is menacing her from the beyond, but Scott solves the mystery of the flashing red lights, and learns the true identity of the man behind a plot to murder the young heiress and steal her inheritance...a scientist who uses telepathy to frighten the young woman.

== Cast ==
- Marie Prevost as Ruth Carson
- Raymond Griffith as Sheridan Scott
- Johnnie Walker as John Blake
- Alice Lake as Norah O'Neill
- Dagmar Godowsky as Roxy
- William Worthington as Luke Carson
- Frank Elliott as Kirk Allen
- Lionel Belmore as Alden Murray
- Jean Hersholt as Ezra Carson
- George Reed as Porter
- Charles Murphy as The Henchman
- Charles West as The Conductor
- Martha Mattox as Secretary

== Production ==
The film is based on a play called The Rear Car by Edward E. Rose, but according to critic Christopher Workman, "the film is not very faithful to its source material....it's a moderately enjoyable ride regardless." The film's survival status is unknown.

The play was filmed again in 1934 as Murder in the Private Car, starring Charles Ruggles as the psychic detective, although in that version, the supernatural elements were played down a bit. Actor Lionel Belmore went on to co-star in a number of 1930s Universal horror films including Frankenstein and The Vampire Bat. Jean Hersholt later starred in a number of MGM horror films, including The Mask of Fu Manchu and Mark of the Vampire.
