= The Yellowback =

1929 film

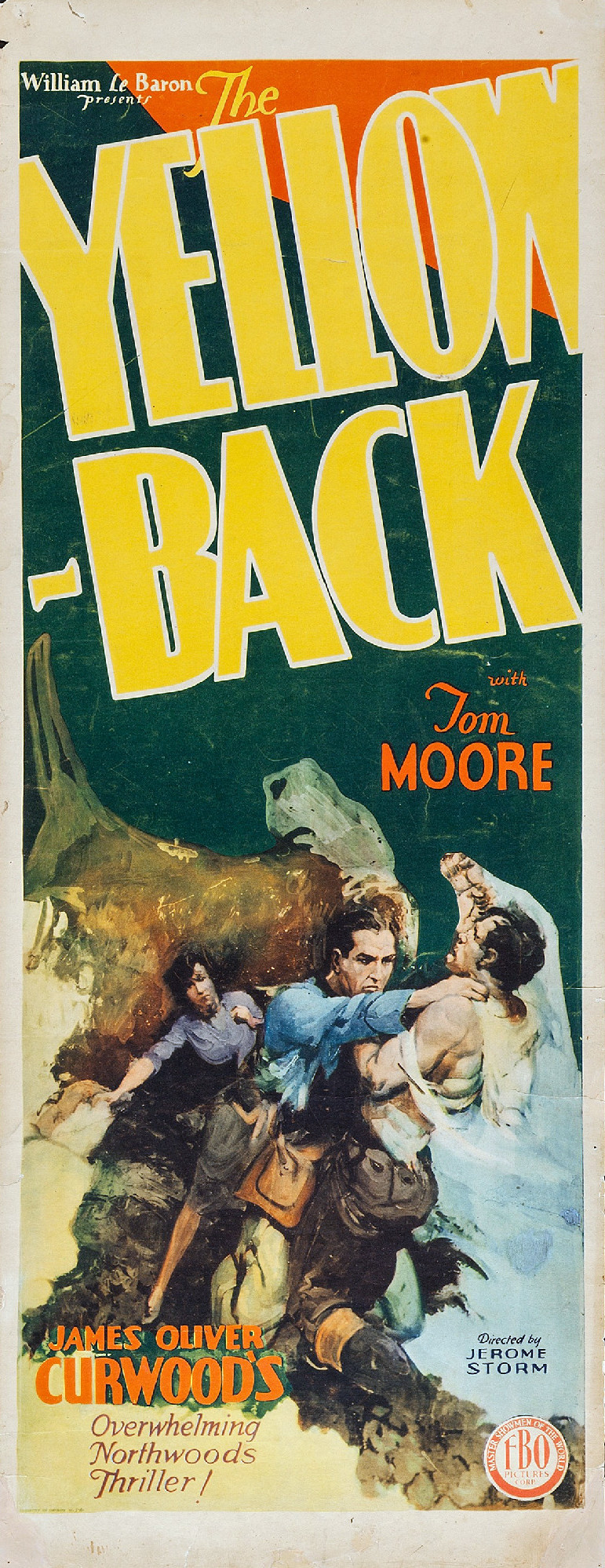
- Theatrical release poster
- Directed by: Jerome Storm
- Screenplay by: Randolph Bartlett; John Twist
- Story by: James Oliver Curwood
- Starring: Tom Moore; Irma Harrison; Tom Santschi; William Martin; Lionel Belmore
- Cinematography: Philip Tannura
- Edited by: Jack Kitchin
- Production company: Film Booking Offices of America
- Distributed by: Film Booking Offices of America
- Release date: January 20, 1929
- Running time: 66 minutes
- Country: United States
- Language: English

The Yellowback is a 1929 American drama film directed by Jerome Storm and written by Randolph Bartlett and John Twist. The film stars Tom Moore, Irma Harrison, Tom Santschi, William Martin and Lionel Belmore. The film was released on January 20, 1929, by Film Booking Offices of America.

== Cast ==
- Tom Moore as O'Mara
- Irma Harrison as Elsie Loisel
- Tom Santschi as Jules Breton
- William Martin as Poleon
- Lionel Belmore as McDougal
