= Beulah Poynter =

American dramatist

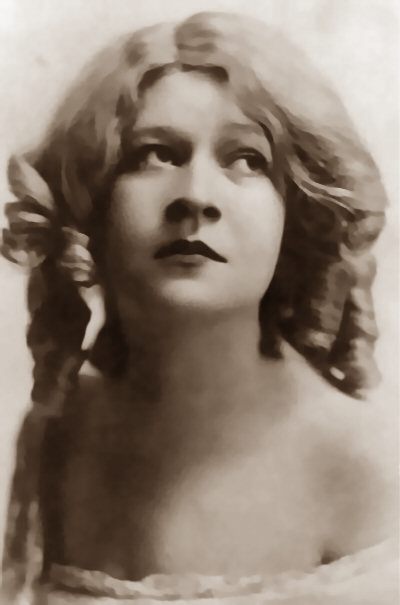
- Born: Beulah Marguerite Poynter; June 6, 1883; Eagleville, Missouri
- Died: August 13, 1960 (aged 77); Manhasset, Long Island, New York
- Other name: Beulah Poynter Leffler
- Occupations: Actor; writer; playwright

Beulah Poynter (June 6, 1883 – August 13, 1960) was an American writer, playwright and actress. Though her career touched on Broadway and Hollywood, Poynter was better known for her starring roles with stock and touring companies and as a prolific writer of mystery and romance stories. Poynter was probably best remembered by theatergoers for her title role in Lena Rivers, a drama she reworked for the stage from the novel by Mary J. Holmes.

== Early life ==
Beulah Marguerite Poynter was born in northern Missouri at Eagleville and raised in nearby Bethany. She was the daughter of Henry Douglas Poynter and Lucy "Lula" Walters and an older sister to brothers, Fred and Victor. Her father, a hotel manager, was a Missourian whose family came from Kentucky, while her mother was born in Iowa to parents who had migrated from Ohio. Poynter was a paternal descendant of James Nevill, a veteran of the American Revolutionary War from Virginia. In her youth Poynter attended area schools before joining the chorus of a local opera company at around the age of sixteen.

== Career ==
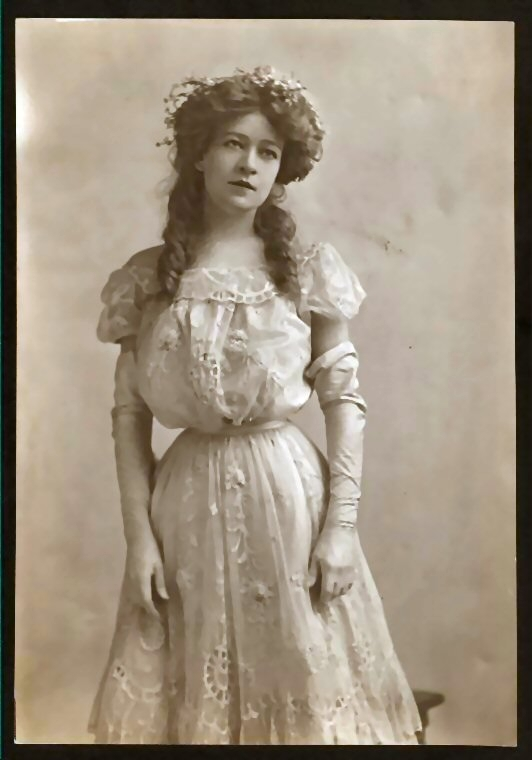
Beulah Poynter

By 1904 Poynter was a leading actress touring with the Eastern Company in Out of the Fold, a comedy-drama by Langdon McCormick. The following year she joined the Pavilion Stock Company to play Bossy in their road production of Charles Hale Hoyt's farce comedy, A Texas Steer. In August 1905 Poynter began a tour playing the title rôle in a dramatization by Edward W. Roland and Edwin Clifford of Charlotte Mary Brame's novel, Dora Thorne. A little over a year later, beginning October 1906, Poynter embarked on a tour with Nixon and Co. performing the title rôle in Lena Rivers, a drama she had adapted from the novel by Mary J. Holmes. The play proved to be a hit with theatergoers and would tour with Poynter at the helm for four seasons.

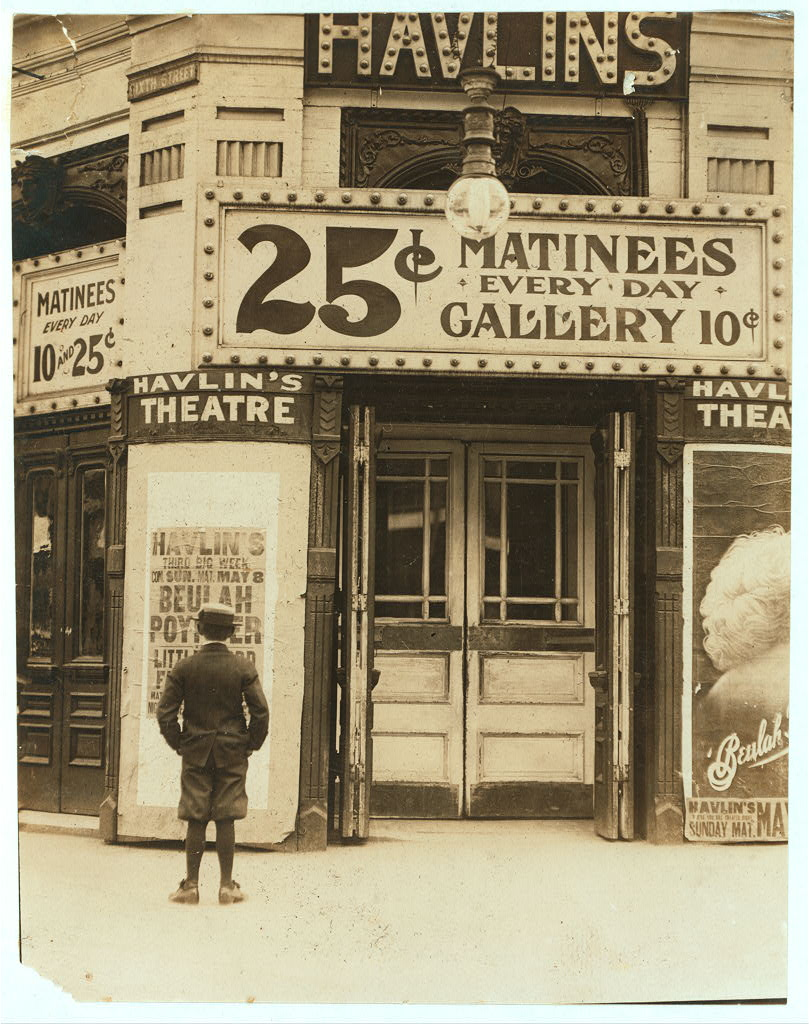
Theater in St. Louis, Missouri, advertising Poynter's appearance in Little Lord Fauntleroy (1910)

In August 1910 Poynter began a tour presenting The Little Girl He Forgot, a drama that she both wrote and, as June Holly, starred in. The play toured into April 1911 and was followed that August by an engagement at the Majestic Theatre in Fort Wayne, Indiana with productions of her dramatization of Edward Eggleston's novel, The Hoosier Schoolmaster, and Poynter's original play Mother's Girl. In October at the Park Theatre in Indianapolis she played Rosalie in Edward Peple's drama The Call of the Cricket.

Poynter continued to tour with her own company often in revivals of Lena Rivers, The Little Girl He Forgot and Mother's Girl. By November 1911 she was starring in road productions of A Kentucky Romance, a dramatic comedy written specifically for her by Joseph Le Brandt. Poynter's company remained on tour with A Kentucky Romance and Lena Rivers into the early months of 1913 before joining a vaudeville company that spring with a farce sketch entitled Dear Doctor.

== Broadway ==
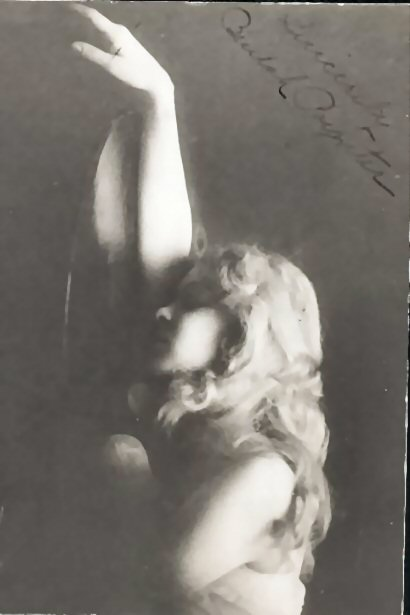
Beulah Poynter

Poynter wrote two plays that appeared on Broadway, The Unborn in 1915 and One Way Street in 1928. At the Harris Theatre in Times Square she played Ethel Tate in Stephen Gardner Champlin's 1919 farce comedy, Who Did it? Of the three productions, only One Way Street reached a modicum of commercial success with fifty-eight performances at George M. Cohan's Theatre between December 1928 and February 1929. The Unborn, in which the villain is an illegal abortionist, became the center of a plagiarism lawsuit between Poynter and the producers of the 1916 motion picture The Sins that Ye Sin. In the end the court ruled that there was insufficient evidence to support the allegation that the film's producers had plagiarized Poynter's play and the case was dismissed.

== Hollywood ==
Poynter reprised her leading rôles in Hollywood adaptations of Lena Rivers (1914) and The Little Girl That He Forgot (1915), and appeared in four additional silent films, The Ordeal (1914), Born Again (1914), Hearts and Flowers (1914) and Heats of Men (1915). Three later films, The Miracle of Money (1920), The Splendid Folly (1933) and Love Is Dangerous (1933) were adapted from Poynter's works.

== Personal life ==
On November 19, 1904, Poynter married actor Burton S. Nixon at Creston, Iowa. A native of Nevada, Missouri, Nixon became Poynter's stage and business manager over the years of their marriage. Poynter married twice more, John Bowers (né Bowersox), her leading man over the early 1910s. and by 1930, George Leffler (1874–1951), a one-time actor turned theatrical producer and booking agent. The latter union would end with his death in 1951. Poynter died nine years later, aged 77, at Manhasset, Long Island.

== Selected literary works ==
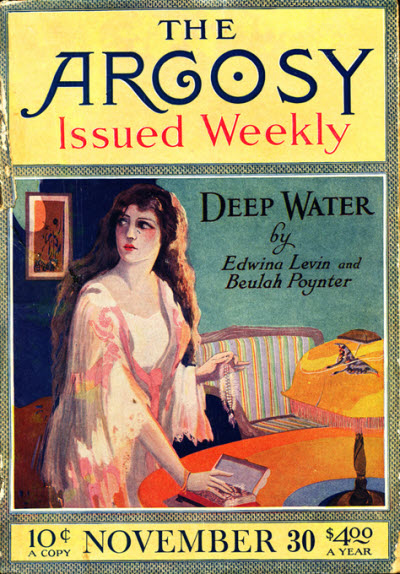
Poynter coauthored Deep Water, serialized in The Argosy in 1918

- Lena Rivers: Dramatized from Book by Mary J. Holmes; Drama in 4 Acts (1906)
- The Queen of the Sea (1907)
- Molly Bawn, a dramatization of the book by Margaret Wolfe Hungerford (1908)
- The Little Girl That He Forgot (1910)
- The Hoosier Schoolmaster, a dramatization of the book by Edward Eggleston (1910)
- The Cause of the War: A Comedy in 1 Act, with John Bowers (1914)
- Marrying Off Emmy, short story (1919)

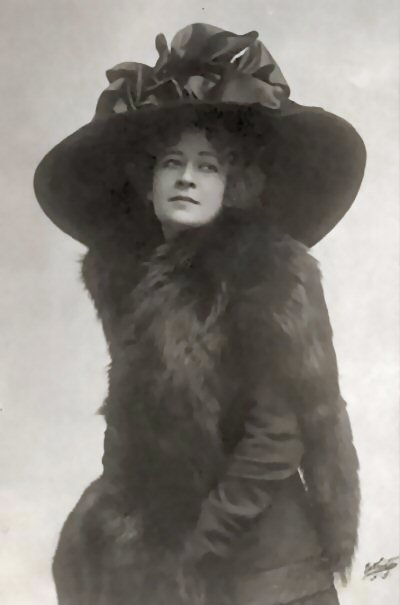
Beulah Poynter

- The First Thrill, a three-act mystery-farce (1921)
- Thumbs Down: a Comedy in Three Acts with Edwin Levin (1921)
- The Murillo Mystery (1927)
- The Girl at the Stage Door: A Love Story (1929)
- The Gingham Bride: A Love Story (1929)
- The Splendid Folly (1929)
- Gay Caprice: A Love Story (1929)
- Fires of Youth: A Love Story (1929)
- Helping Hortense, syndicated story (1930)
- The Squatter Girl: A Love Story (1930)
- Joan of the River: A Love Story (1930)
- Love is Like That: A Love Story (1930)
- The Husband Hunter (1930)
- Cinderella on Broadway, syndicated story (1931)
- Honeymoon Cruise: A Love Story (1931)
- Mad Marriage: A Love Story (1931)
- Murder on 47th Street (1931)
- The Make-Believe Bride: A Love Story (1931)
- Everything but Love (1933)
- Dancing Man: A Love Story (1933)
- The Circus-Girl Wife: A Love Story (1934)
- Donna of the Big Top (1934)
- Love's Labor Won: A Love Story (1934)
- Lost Rapture (1934)
- The Disappearance of Mary Amber (1934)
- A Woman Dies (1935)
- The Enchanted Hour (1935)
- Love is not Enough: A Love Story (1936)
- Mad Folly: A Love Story (1937)
- No Time for Tears; or, Faith, Hope and no Charity (1945)
- White Trash (1952)
