= Mary Jane Holmes =

American novelist

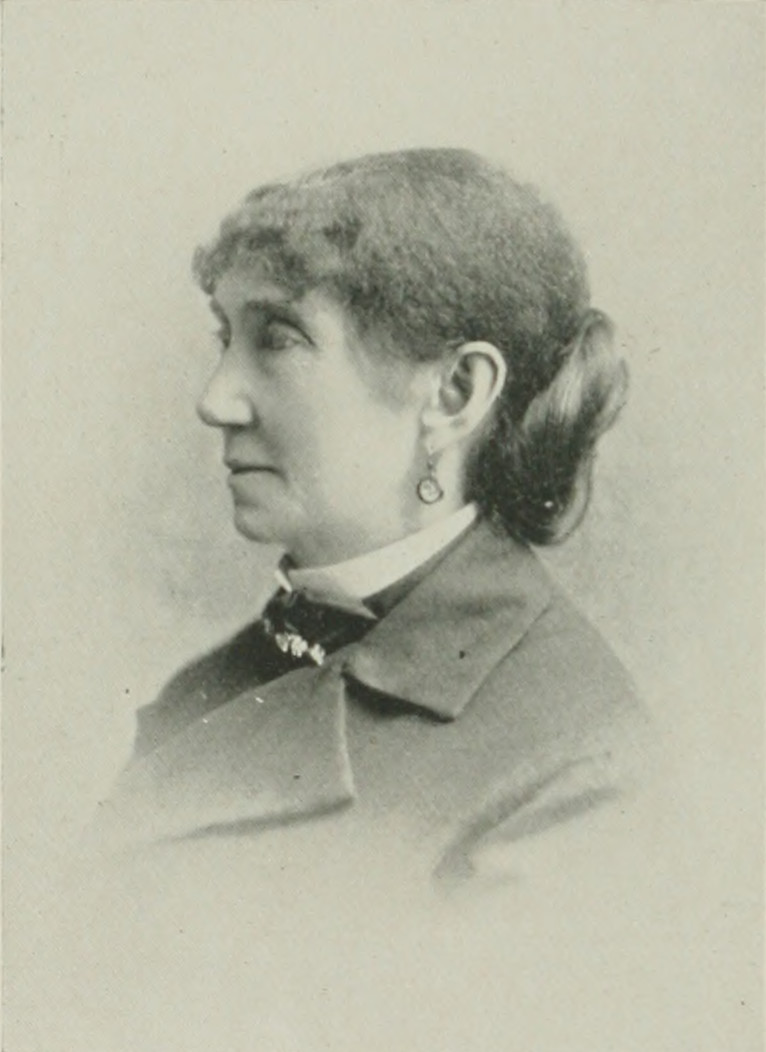
- "A Woman of the Century"
- Born: April 5, 1825; Brookfield, Massachusetts
- Died: October 6, 1907 (aged 82); Brockport, New York

Mary Jane Holmes (April 5, 1825 – October 6, 1907) was an American author who published 39 novels, as well as short stories. Her first novel sold 250,000 copies; and she had total sales of 2 million books in her lifetime, second only to Harriet Beecher Stowe. Her books included: "Tempest and Sunshine" (1854), "English Orphans" (1855), "Homestead on the Hillside" (1855), "Lena Rivers" (1856), "Meadow Brook" (1857), "Dora Deane" (1858), "Cousin Maude" (1860), "Marian Gray" 186^, "Hugh Worthington" (1864), "Cameron Vide" (1867). "Rose Mather" (1868), "Ethelyn’s Mistake" (1869), "Edna Browning" (1872), "Mildred" (1877), "Forest House" (1879), "Daisy Thornton," "Queenie Hetherton" (1883), "Christmas Stories" (1884), "Bessie's Fortune" (1885). "Gretchen" (1887), "Marguerite" (1891).

Portraying domestic life in small-town and rural settings, she examined gender relationships, as well as those of class and race. She also dealt with slavery and the American Civil War with a strong sense of moral justice. Since the late 20th century, she has received fresh recognition and reappraisal, although her popular work was excluded from most 19th-century literary histories.

== Early life and education ==
Mary Jane Hawes was born in Brookfield, Massachusetts in 1825, the fifth of Fanny (Olds) and Preston Hawes' nine children. The household was economically modest, but the parents encouraged intellectual endeavor. She may also have been influenced by her uncle, Rev. Joel Hawes (1789–1867), for many years minister at the First Congregational Church in Hartford, Connecticut, and known for his published sermons and other writings. Preston Hawes died when Mary Jane was 12 and she started teaching school at 13. Interested in writing from an early age, she published her first story at 15.

== Marriage and family ==
On August 9, 1849, Hawes married Daniel Holmes, a graduate of Yale College from New York City. They moved for a time to Versailles, Kentucky in the Bluegrass Region, where they both taught for a few years. These were formative years, as Holmes used the small-town, rural setting and people she knew as inspiration for her first novel and others set in the antebellum South.

In 1852 the Holmes family returned to New York and settled in Brockport, a short distance west of Rochester, where Daniel read law and was ultimately admitted to the bar. He went into practice and also served in local politics. They had no children. Holmes' supportive marriage was one she used as a model for several portrayed in her novels.

== Career ==
Holmes used her experiences in Kentucky for the material of several novels. In 1854 at the age of 29, she published her first novel, Tempest and Sunshine. Its central girl characters, Julia and Fanny, were reportedly modeled on the local family of John Singleton and his daughters Bettie and Susan. The portrayal of girls with contrasting characters was resolved with a sense of moral justice, as they both traveled personal journeys of growth. While sales of the novel were slow at first, they steadily continued, and ultimately totaled about 250,000 copies. Reprinted in 1886, this novel was her most popular. She was first published by Appleton, and later for 20 years by G.W. Carleton, which was succeeded by G.W. Dillingham, all of New York City. As The Nation noted in its obituary at her death:

It is an eternal paradox of our world of letters that the books which enjoy the largest sale are barely recognized as existing by the guardians of literary tradition. Mrs. Mary Jane Holmes, who died Sunday at Brockport, N.Y., wrote thirty-nine novels with aggregate sales, it is said, of more than two million copies, and yet she had not even a paragraph devoted to her life and works in the histories of American Literature. ("The Week")

The theme of most of her novels was domestic life, reflecting society in the antebellum years, as well as during and after the American Civil War. Her books were very popular and she was published by major firms in New York. Her sales were second nationally only to those of Harriet Beecher Stowe; in total Holmes sold more than two million books.

As the literary scholar Judith Fetterley notes:

[T]the literature of mid-nineteenth century women is essentially about women. Thus the first truth the women have to tell is that not all Americans are male and the assumption that an American text must be a man's story told by men is partisan to say the least. Were this truth to be told, of course, it would require a redefinition of what constitutes an American theme; it would require the possibility that a story by a woman about women could be an American text...at issue equally is the matter of perspective. For a man's story told by a man is not necessarily the same as a man's story told by a woman.

Critics of the time and early 20th century classified Holmes' and other women authors' work as "sentimental" and downplayed it because of appeal to the common reader. Recent critics have appreciated how Holmes grappled seriously with issues of gender, race and class, as well as slavery and the Civil War. She created attractive characters who also had flaws, with whom readers could identify. The scholar Earl Yarington notes that her heroines "go out, often on their own accord, into an uncertain world and make new lives for themselves." This experience provides the heroine "with an education so she can learn how to thrive and improve not only her own conditions, but also the conditions of others." Her work appealed to many readers at a time of rapidly expanding literacy among women.

While Holmes traveled extensively to Europe and Asia, trips from which she collected art, she continued to write and publish about one book annually. She wrote a total of 39 novels, plus numerous short stories and novellas. Many were first serialized in the New York Weekly "storypaper". The popularity of her novel Marian Grey (1863) reportedly led to a jump in the paper's circulation by 50,000, and it reached 100,000 by 1865.

Holmes was active in the Episcopal Church and its charitable activities. She started local activities to share her collection from her travels and education with young women.

== Death and legacy ==
Holmes died in 1907, at the age of 82, in Brockport. Her obituary was published a few days later in the Nation, reflecting her stature. Long excluded from literary histories of the nineteenth century, the author was reappraised by scholars in the late 20th and early 21st century, who recognized her achievements and the value of her work.

== Publications ==
- Tempest and Sunshine (New York, 1854); reprint New York: G.W. Dillingham (1886)
- The English Orphans (1855)
- The Homestead on the Hillside and other Tales (Auburn, 1855)
- 'Lena Rivers (1856)
- Meadow Brook (New York, 1857)
- Dora Deane, or the East India Uncle, and Maggie Miller, or, Old Hagar's Secret (1858)
- Cousin Maude and Rosamond (1860)
- Marian Grey; or The Heiress of Redstone Hall (1863)
- Hugh Worthington (1863)
- Darkness and Daylight (1864)
- The Cameron Pride, or Purified by Suffering, or Family Pride (1867)
- The Christmas Font, a story for young folks (1868)
- Rose Mather, a Tale of the War (1868)
- Ethelyn's Mistake (1869)
- Millbank; or, Roger Irving's Ward (1871)
- Edna Browning; or The Leighton Homestead (1872)
- West Lawn, and The Rector of St. Mark's (1874)
- Edith Lyle or Edith Lyle's Secret (1876)
- Mildred (1877)
- Daisy Thornton and Jessie Graham (1878)
- Glen's Creek (1878)
- Forrest House (1879)
- Chateau d'Or (1880)
- Red Bird (1880)
- Maggie Lee! Bad Spelling, Diamonds, The Answered Prayer (1881)
- Madeline (1881)
- Queenie Hetherton (1883)
- Christmas Stories (1884)
- Bessie's Fortune (1885)
- Tracy Park
- Gretchen (1887)
- Aikenside
- Red Bird's Christmas Story (1892)
- Paul Ralston (1897)
- The Tracy Diamonds (1899)
- Rena's Experiment (1904)
