= Chris and the Wonderful Lamp =

Stage work and novel

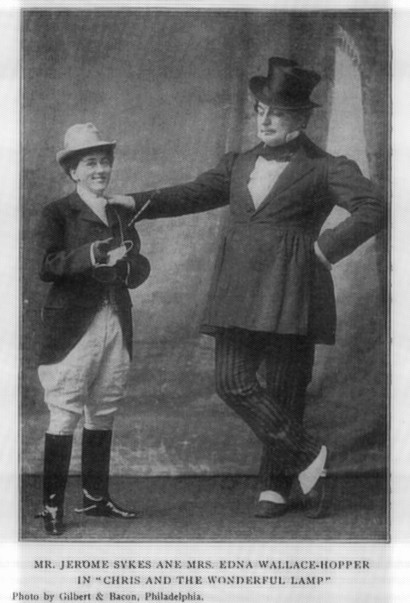
International Magazine 1900

Chris and the Wonderful Lamp is a stage work in three acts with music by John Philip Sousa and both book and lyrics by Glen MacDonough that is based on the 1895 children's novel of the same name by Albert Stearns. Both the stage work and the novel are a reimagining of the Aladdin folktale within an American context; with the premise of the story being the purchase of Aladdin's lamp by an American boy, Chris Wagstaff, in an antique shop in Connecticut. Chris's wishes with the lamp lead to adventures in New York City, San Francisco, on a ship at sea, and ultimately the fictional kingdom of Etheria where Chris awakens and meets Aladdin who has been in an enchanted sleep for centuries.

== History ==
Described as an "extravaganza" and not an opera or musical by its creators, Chris and the Wonderful Lamp contains elements of both opera and musical burlesque and resides in a place in-between these two theatre genres. As such, the work has been variously labeled as an operetta and a musical by scholars. The musical premiered at the Hyperion Theatre in New Haven, Connecticut on October 23, 1899; and then toured to New York City among other cities. The work became the first musical to have its Broadway premiere in the 20th century; opening on New Year's Day 1900 at Hammerstein's Victoria Theatre.

The original production of Chris and the Wonderful Lamp was directed by Ben Teal and produced by B.D. Stevens and Klaw and Erlanger. The costumes were designed by F. Richard Anderson, and the sets were designed by Gates and Morange, Homer Emens, and Ernest Gros. The original cast was led by Jerome Sykes as The Genie, Edna Wallace Hopper as Chris Wagstaff, and Emilie Beaupre as Aladdin.

== Reviews ==
From a review in the Pittsburg Press, the Broadway production had "all the swing and ginger the Sousa contrives to compress into his marches." The march from the show "The Man Behind the Gun" received an encore, and the press concluded that it was "well worth the price, if only the scenic effects are considered."

== Revival performances ==
Chris and the Wonderful Lamp was revived by the Comic Opera Guild of Ann Arbor, Michigan in 2011 and again by the Victorian Lyric Opera Company in 2017.

== Roles ==
| Role | 1899 Premiere Cast | 2011 Comic Opera Guild Cast | 2017 Victorian Lyric Opera Cast |
|---|---|---|---|
| The Genie, the original Slave of the Lamp | Jerome Sykes | Brandon Grimes | G. Stephen Stokes |
| Chris Wagstaff, a “boy about town” | Edna Wallace Hopper | Emily Goodwin | Carla Rountree |
| Scotty Jones, boy-of-all-work at Miss Prisms' Academey | John Page | Tom Skylis | James Carpenter |
| Lovemoney, a New England money-lender and The Grand Vizier | Randolph Curry | Tom Skylis | Blair Eig |
| Mr. Pettingill and Al Kiezar, chief of the Secret Police of Etheria | Herbert Carter | Frank Brinker | Rand Huntzinger |
| Selwell, the Auctioneer | Chas. H. Drew | Patricia Petiet | Ed Vilade |
| Fanny Wiggins, star pupil at Miss Prisms’ Academy | Irene Stewert | Katherine Kujala | Lawren Hill |
| Miss Prisms, principal of the Academy | Mabella Baker | Barbara Scanlon | Denise Young |
| Aladdin, Prince of Etheria | Emilie Beaupre | Keith Austin Brown | Ted Kerrick |
| Captain of the Gaurds | Frank Todd | Frank Brinker | |
| Katie Clancy, maid of all the work at the academy Amine, talking doll in Etheria | Nellie Lynch | Sarah Faix | Emma Jensen |
| Queen of Dreams | May Norton | Angela Torres-Kutkuhn | |
| Chorus: Pupils of Prisms' Academy and talking dolls of Etheria, guards, slaves, and dancers | | | |
