= Fools of Fashion =

1926 film

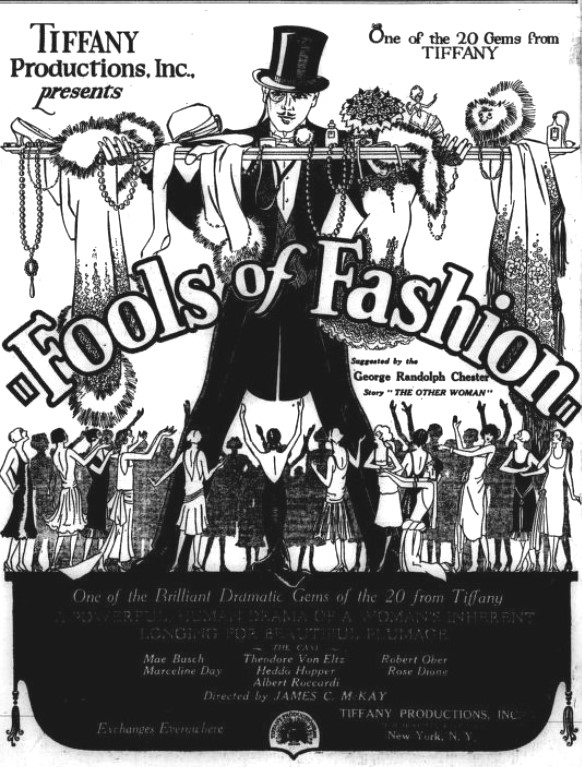
- Advertisement
- Directed by: James C. McKay
- Based on: "The Other Woman" by George Randolph Chester
- Starring: Mae Busch; Marceline Day; Theodore von Eltz
- Cinematography: Faxon M. Dean; Al M. Green
- Production company: Tiffany Pictures
- Distributed by: Tiffany Pictures
- Release date: October 1, 1926
- Running time: 7 reels
- Country: United States
- Language: Silent (English intertitles)

Fools of Fashion is a 1926 American silent society drama film directed by James C. McKay. It was produced and released by Tiffany Pictures.

== Cast ==
- Mae Busch as Enid Alden
- Marceline Day as Mary Young
- Theodore von Eltz as Matthew Young
- Robert Ober as Joe Alden
- Hedda Hopper as Countess De Fragni
- Rose Dione as Francine
- James Mack as Pawnbroker
- Albert Roccardi as William Norris

== Preservation ==
A print of Fools of Fashion survives in the BFI National Archive.
