= James C. McKay (director) =

American filmmaker

- Born: January 14, 1894; New York, New York, United States
- Died: August 8, 1971 (aged 77); Orange, California, United States
- Occupations: Director, Editor
- Years active: 1916–1949

James C. McKay (1894–1971) was an American film director and editor. His directorial debut was the 1916 Fox Film release The Ruling Passion shot in Jamaica under the supervision of Herbert Brenon. He directed several silent films for Tiffany Pictures in the mid-1920s. He was hired by MGM to shoot Tarzan Escapes in 1935, but the studio was dissatisfied with his efforts and he was replaced by Richard Thorpe.

== Selected filmography ==
=== Director ===
- The Ruling Passion (1916)
- A Sinless Sinner (1919)
- Souls for Sables (1925)
- Fools of Fashion (1926)
- Lightning (1927)
- The Broken Gate (1927)
- Tarzan Escapes (1936)

=== Editor ===
- The Eternal Sin (1917)
- The Lone Wolf (1917)
- Merry-Go-Round (1923)
- Zander the Great (1925)
- Morals for Men (1925)
- Soul Mates (1925)
- Out of the Storm (1926)
- Lost at Sea (1926)
- College Days (1926)
- That Model from Paris (1926)
- The First Night (1927)
- One Hour of Love (1927)
- Cheaters (1927)
- The Princess from Hoboken (1927)
- The Beauty Shoppers (1928)
- Beware of Blondes (1928)
- Dream of Love (1928)
- Marianne (1929)
- They Learned About Women (1930)
- Good Sam (1948)
- Black Magic (1949)

== Bibliography ==
- Soister, John T., Nicolella, Henry & Joyce, Steve. American Silent Horror, Science Fiction and Fantasy Feature Films, 1913-1929. McFarland, 2014.
- Taliaferro, John. Tarzan Forever: The Life of Edgar Rice Burroughs the Creator of Tarzan. Simon and Schuster, 2002.
