= Beware of Blondes =

Beware of Blondes can refer to:

- Beware of Blondes (1928 film), a 1928 American film
- Beware of Blondes (1950 film), a 1950 French film
