= The Heart of Nora Flynn =

1916 film

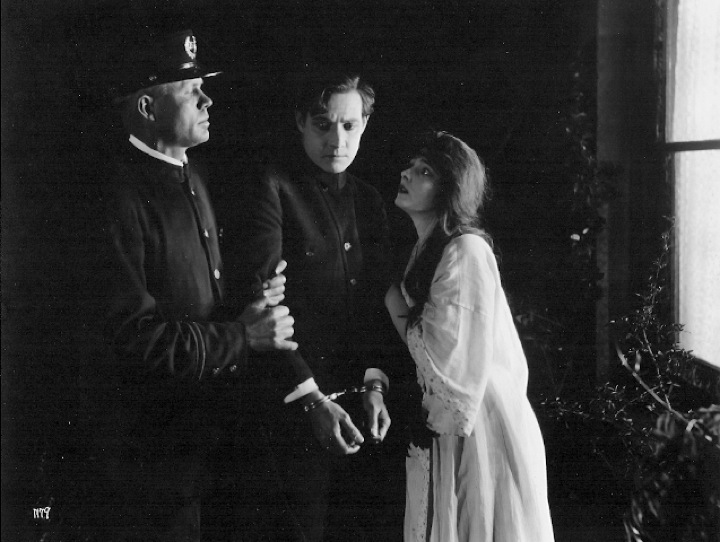
- Scene from the film
- Directed by: Cecil B. DeMille
- Written by: Jeanie MacPherson; Hector Turnbull
- Produced by: Cecil B. DeMille
- Starring: Marie Doro
- Cinematography: Alvin Wyckoff
- Edited by: Cecil B. DeMille
- Production company: Jesse L. Lasky Feature Play Co.
- Distributed by: Paramount Pictures
- Release date: April 23, 1916
- Running time: 50 minutes
- Country: United States
- Language: Silent (English intertitles)

The Heart of Nora Flynn is a 1916 American silent drama film directed by Cecil B. DeMille. It stars Marie Doro in her first film for Jesse L. Lasky. Art direction for the film was done by Wilfred Buckland. It premiered on April 23, 1916 at the Strand Theatre in New York City

== Cast ==
- Marie Doro as Nora Flynn
- Elliott Dexter as Nolan
- Ernest Joy as Brantley Stone
- Lola May as Mrs. Stone
- Billy Jacobs as Tommy Stone
- Charles West as Jack Murray
- Peggy George as Anne Stone
- Mrs. Lewis McCord as Maggie The Cook
- Lucien Littlefield as The Gardener

== Preservation ==
A complete 35 mm print of The Heart of Nora Flynn is held by the George Eastman Museum in Rochester, New York.

== See also ==
- The House That Shadows Built (1931 promotional film by Paramount)
