= The Bunch and Judy =

American musical comedy in two acts

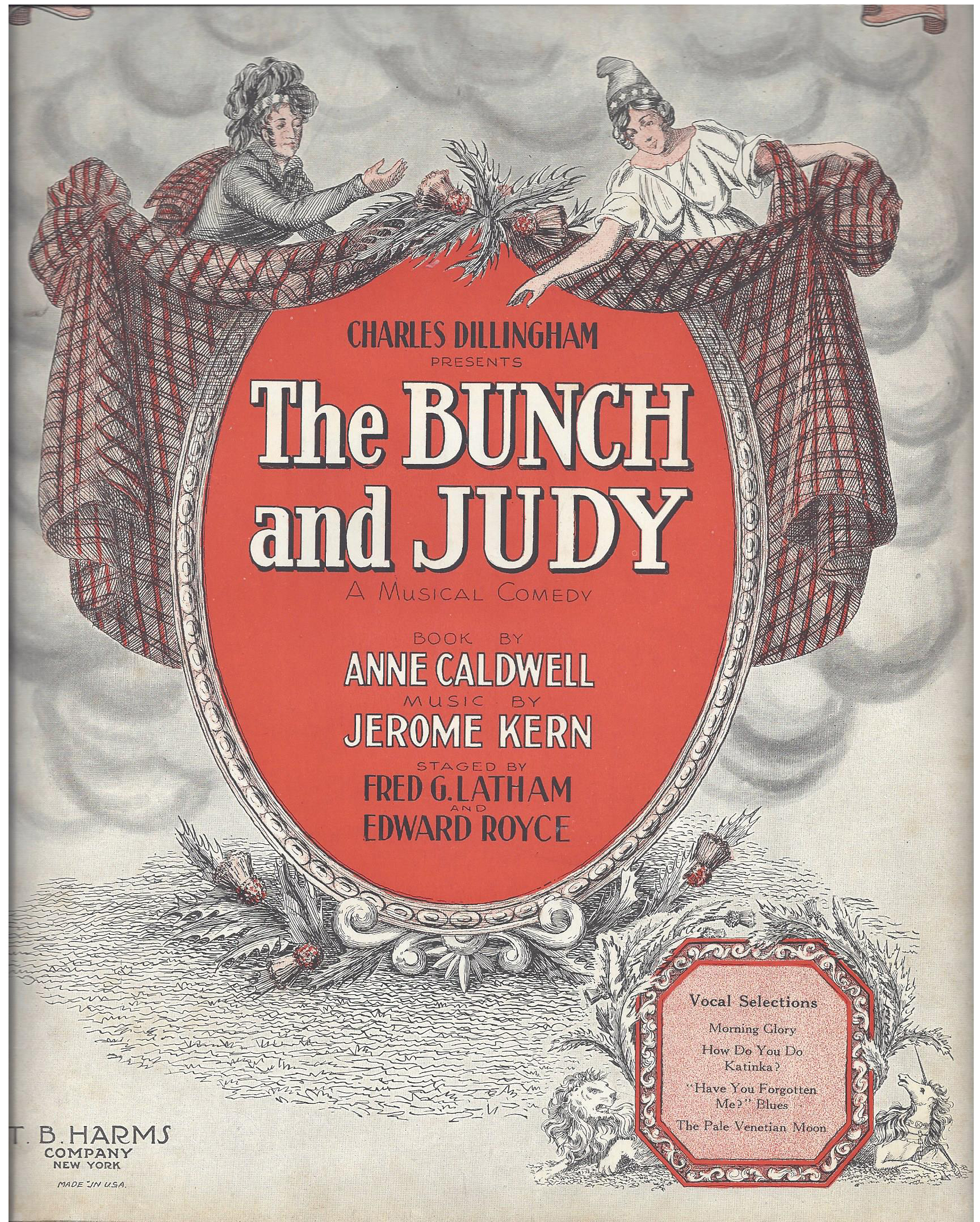
- Sheet Music Cover
- Music: Jerome Kern
- Lyrics: Anne Caldwell
- Book: Anne Caldwell and Hugh Ford

The Bunch and Judy is a musical comedy in two acts with book by Anne Caldwell and R. H. Burnside, lyrics by Anne Caldwell, and music by Jerome Kern. The story centered on a Broadway starlet, who marries a Scottish nobleman, only to grow disenchanted and return to show business and the man she loves.

The show was produced by Charles Dillingham at the Globe Theater, and opened November 28, 1922. The musical director was Victor Baravalle and the music was orchestrated by Stephan Jones and Victor Baravalle. The show was staged by Fred G. Latham. Scenic design by Frank E. Gates, and Edward A. Morange. Costume design by Wanamaker, Paul Poiret, and George Barber. It ran for 63 performances, closing on January 20, 1923.

The cast was headlined by Fred Astaire (Gerald Lane), Adele Astaire (Judy Jordan), and Philip Tonge (Lord Kinlock). The Astaire siblings played the romantic couple. Gerald Bordman reports that "Broadway’s critics were not bowled over. Although many headlines implied reviews would be raves, notices themselves were filled with qualifications. Most of the enthusiasm was reserved for the Astaires. When it came to Kern's score, the critics were generally unhappy". Bordman goes on to state that he agrees with the critical consensus, stating that most of the score is either pallid, unremarkable, or taken from Kern's earlier compositions.

== Synopsis ==
As reported by Gerald Boardman: "The story centered on musical star Judy Jordan. As soon as she gives her final performance in Love Will Find a Way, she abandons her career and sails for Scotland to marry a laird. The marriage fails when she and her husband's snobbish friends cannot reach an accommodation. She heads to London, discovering her old leading man, Gerald Lane, there. In no time she realizes that Gerald has always been her true love."

As reported by Burns Mantle:

Act 1

Judy Jordan is leaving the cast of a Broadway show after 40 weeks, to marry Lord Kinlock, who is visiting America from Scotland. The cast gives Judy a farewell dinner on stage after the last performance.

Act 2

In Scotland, Judy is married to Kinlock, but unhappy because she is snubbed by the locals. The troupe is touring Europe. Angry at the Scots, Judy goes home with the troupe, returns to the stage and marries Gerald Lane, her former leading man.

== Songs ==
Act 1

- “Silenzio”
- “The Naughty Nobleman”
- “Because You Love the Singer”
- “Pale Venetian Moon”
- “Hot Dog”
- “Morning Glory”

Act 2

- “Lovely Lassie”
- “Every Day in Every Way”
- “Times Square”
- “Have You Forgotten Me”
- “How Do You Do, Katinka?”
- “Peach Girl”
