= Grand Larceny (1922 film) =

1922 film by Wallace Worsley

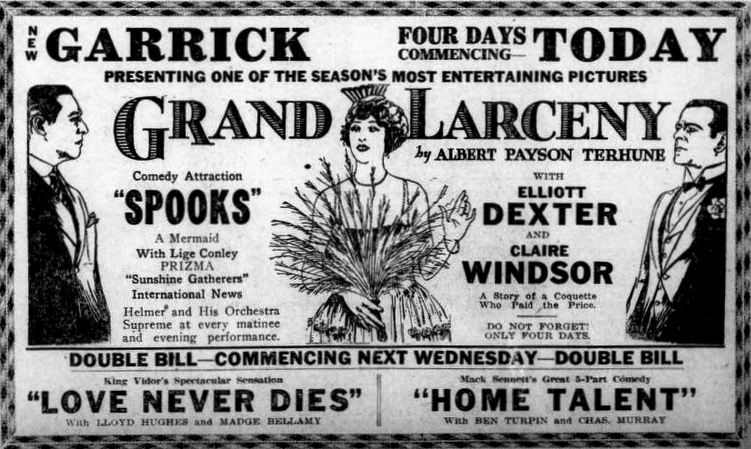
- Directed by: Wallace Worsley
- Written by: Charles Kenyon; Bess Meredyth
- Story by: Albert Payson Terhune
- Produced by: Goldwyn Pictures
- Starring: Claire Windsor; Elliott Dexter
- Cinematography: Norbert Brodine
- Distributed by: Goldwyn Pictures
- Release date: February 26, 1922
- Running time: 60 minutes
- Country: United States
- Language: Silent (English intertitles)

Grand Larceny is a lost 1922 American silent romantic drama film directed by Wallace Worsley and starring Elliott Dexter, Claire Windsor, and Lowell Sherman. It was produced and released by Goldwyn Pictures.

== Plot ==
As described in a film magazine, John Annixter has married and brought to his New York home the coquettish Virginia beauty Kathleen Vaughn, whose love for her husband does not lessen her desire for the admiration and attention of men. John is so absorbed in his business that he is unable to enter into his wife's social life, and she is often thrown into the company of other men. She meets architect Barry Clive, a friend of her husband's, and her innocent flirtation is misinterpreted by him. He calls on Kathleen during John's absence, and embraces her against her will. John comes in suddenly and finds them in this compromising situation. He refuses to hear his wife's explanation, declaring that he will give her a divorce so she can marry Barry. Before leaving, John tells Barry, "The woman who can be stolen from one man can be stolen from another." Kathleen marries Barry and is soon subjected to his unreasoning jealousy. John's words ring in Barry's ears and he is haunted with suspicion. Finally, at a concert Kathleen is suddenly overcome when hearing a song that she and John used to sing together. When she goes out, she finds John sitting in an alcove. Barry finds her with her arms outstretched to her former husband. There is a furious scene between the men, and Barry tells John that he has robbed him of the dearest thing in the world, his respect for the woman he loves. Kathleen, who has been sobered and altered by the hell she has been through, breaks in and tells them that she refuses to be bargained between them. She tells them that she will go out in the world and learn to be worthy of the greatest love. "And who will you come back to, me or him?" asks Barry. "Who knows," replies Kathleen as she leaves them.

== Cast ==
- Claire Windsor as Kathleen Vaughn
- Elliott Dexter as John Annixter
- Richard Tucker as Franklin
- Tom Gallery as Thad
- Roy Atwell as Harkness Boyd
- John Cossar as Emerson
- Lowell Sherman as Barry Clive
