= The Wood Nymph (film) =

- Directed by: Paul Powell; Roy Hiram Rice (asst dir)
- Written by: Granville Warwick (Note: A pseudonym of D. W. Griffith.)
- Screenplay by: Monte Katterjohn
- Produced by: D. W. Griffith
- Starring: Marie Doro
- Cinematography: John Leezer
- Music by: Joseph Carl Breil
- Production company: Fine Arts Film Company
- Distributed by: Triangle Film Corporation
- Release date: January 23, 1916
- Running time: 5 reels
- Country: United States
- Language: Silent film (English intertitles)

The Wood Nymph is a lost 1916 American silent drama film whose story was written by D. W. Griffith as Granville Warwick, produced by his Fine Arts Film company, directed by Paul Powell and distributed by the Triangle Film Corporation. This film stars Marie Doro, a stage actress recently arrived in films, in a Gishian type of role and was expressly written for her by Griffith.

== Cast ==
- Marie Doro – Daphne
- Frank Campeau – David Arnold
- Wilfred Lucas – Fred Arnold
- Charles West – William Jones
- Cora Drew – Mrs. Arnold
- Fred Graham – Pete
- Pearl Elsmore – Hippolyta
