= The Ruling Passion (1916 film) =

1916 film

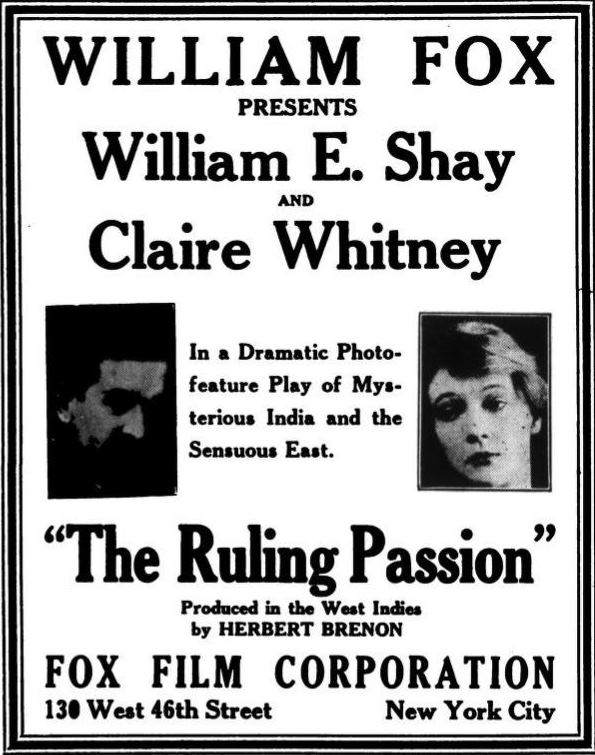
- Directed by: James C. McKay
- Written by: Herbert Brenon
- Produced by: Herbert Brenon
- Starring: William E. Shay; Claire Whitney; Florence Deshon
- Production company: Fox Film
- Distributed by: Fox Film
- Release date: January 30, 1916
- Running time: 50 minutes
- Country: United States
- Languages: Silent; English intertitles

The Ruling Passion is a 1916 American silent drama film directed by James C. McKay and starring William E. Shay, Claire Whitney and Florence Deshon. Produced by Fox Film, like several of the studio's productions at the time it was shot in Kingston, Jamaica. It is now considered a lost film.

== Cast ==
- William E. Shay as Ram Singh, the Rajah of Mawar
- Claire Whitney as Claire Sherlock
- Harry Burkhardt as Harvey Walcott
- Edward Boring as Ramlaal
- Thelma Parker as Nadia
- Florence Deshon as Blanche Walcott
- Stephen Grattan as Governor of Raj Putana

== Bibliography ==
- Connelly, Robert B. The Silents: Silent Feature Films, 1910-36, Volume 40, Issue 2. December Press, 1998.
