= The Billionaire (musical) =

1902 musical

The Billionaire is a musical in three acts with music by Gustave Kerker, and both book and lyrics by Harry B. Smith. The show was written with the backing of producers Klaw and Erlanger and was made specifically for the talents of Jerome Sykes who portrayed "The Billionaire", John Doe. The action of the musical begins in Nice, France during Carnival where the billionaire Sykes meets a young American girl, Pansy Good (portrayed by Nellie Follis), studying to be an actress. Impressed with her talents, he buys her Doe's Theatre in New York City and establishes her as a star. Later, Doe attempts to ride a horse in a race at the Longchamp Racecourse in Paris, but is too fat to succeed. Pansy rides the horse instead and wins the race.

The Billionaire premiered on Broadway at Daly's Theatre on December 29, 1902, where it ran for a total of 104 performances; closing on March 28, 1903 The production was later remounted for a 8 more performances at the Grand Opera House the following April. Herbert Gresham directed the production and Ned Wayburn choreographed the show. The costumes were designed by F. Richard Anderson, and the sets were designed by Ernest Albert. Others in the cast included May Robson as Mrs. Peppercorn, Sallie Fisher as Flora, and Marie Doro as Rosalba.

After the New York run, the musical toured the United States; ultimately closing in Chicago after Sykes caught pneumonia in that city and died on December 29, 1903.

== Critical assessment ==
Theatre historian Gerald Bordman stated, "A conventional show, The Billionaire met with immediate success in New York, although it was quickly forgotten after its final curtain call. The run-of-the-mill songs Kerker and Smith ground out covered the requisite range— pretty songs, coon songs, semi-classical, sentimental, and topical."

== Bibliography ==
- Bordman, Gerald Martin; Norton, Richard (2010). American Musical Theatre: A Chronicle. Oxford University Press. ISBN 9780199729708.
- Dietz, Dan (2022). "The Billionaire". The Complete Book of 1900s Broadway Musicals. Rowman & Littlefield Publishers. ISBN 9781538168943.
- Franceschina, John (2004). Harry B. Smith: Dean of American Librettists. Taylor & Francis. ISBN 9781135949082.
- Letellier, Robert Ignatius (2015). Operetta: A Sourcebook, Volume II. Cambridge Scholars Publishing. ISBN 9781443885089.
- Mantle, Burns; Sherwood, Garrison P.; Chapman, John Arthur (1944). "The Billionaire". The Best Plays of 1899-1909. Dodd, Mead & Co.
