= The Lash (1916 film) =

1916 film by James Young

- Directed by: James Young
- Screenplay by: George DuBois Proctor; James Young
- Story by: Paul West
- Produced by: Jesse L. Lasky
- Starring: Marie Doro; Elliott Dexter; James Neill; Thomas Delmar; Jane Wolfe; Veda McEvers
- Cinematography: Paul P. Perry
- Production company: Jesse L. Lasky Feature Play Company
- Distributed by: Paramount Pictures
- Release date: October 1, 1916
- Running time: 90 minutes
- Country: United States
- Language: English

The Lash is a 1916 American drama silent film directed by James Young and written by George DuBois Proctor and James Young. The film stars Marie Doro, Elliott Dexter, James Neill, Thomas Delmar, Jane Wolfe and Veda McEvers. The film was released October 1, 1916, by Paramount Pictures.

== Cast ==
- Marie Doro as Sidonie Du Val
- Elliott Dexter as Warren Harding
- James Neill as John Du Val
- Thomas Delmar as Pierre Broule
- Jane Wolfe as Henriette Catenat
- Veda McEvers as Violet Wayne
- Raymond Hatton as Mr. Crawdon
- Josephine Rice as Mrs. Warren Harding
