= Souls for Sables =

1925 film

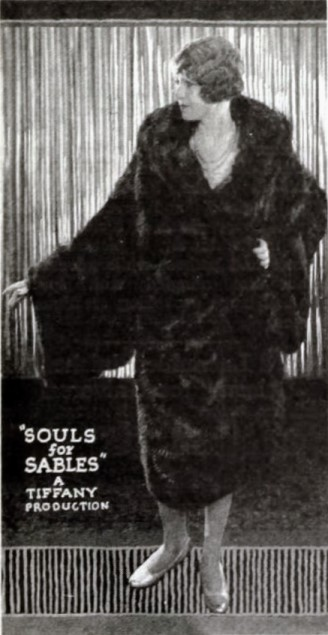
- Advertisement
- Directed by: James C. McKay
- Written by: A. P. Younger; Philbin Stoneman
- Based on: Garlan & Co. by David Graham Phillips
- Produced by: Tiffany Pictures
- Starring: Claire Windsor
- Cinematography: Paul Perry
- Edited by: F. Haddon Ware
- Distributed by: Tiffany Pictures
- Release date: September 14, 1925
- Running time: 70 minutes
- Country: United States
- Language: Silent (English intertitles)

Souls for Sables is a 1925 American silent drama film directed by James C. McKay and starring Claire Windsor. It was produced and released by Tiffany Pictures.

== Plot ==
As described in a film magazine reviews, Fred Garlan is devoted to his wife Alice but has little time and not too much money to lavish on her. She seeks diversion outside her home and finds it in a crowd of fast people includes Esther Hamilton and Harrison Morrill. Alice does not know the evil in Morrell or Esther's life of deception regarding her husband. She admires Esther's sable coat and expresses a desire to have one like it. Morrill contrives so that Alice obtains enough money through winning at poker and speculation to buy herself a sable coat. The husband is suspicious as he believes Morrill bought the coat and he and his wife separate. However, there is a reconciliation, after which Alice is satisfied with her home and life.

== Cast ==
- Claire Windsor as Alice Garlan
- Eugene O'Brien as Fred Garlan
- Edith Yorke as Mrs. Kendall
- George Fawcett as Mr. Nelson
- Eileen Percy as Esther Hamilton
- Anders Randolf as Harrison Morrill
- Robert Ober as Jim Hamilton
- Miki Morita (uncredited)
- Claire Adams as Helen Ralston (uncredited)

== Preservation ==
A print of Souls for Sables is in the Library of Congress collection, BFI National Archive, and George Eastman House.
