= 12.10 =

1919 British silent film by Herbert Brenon

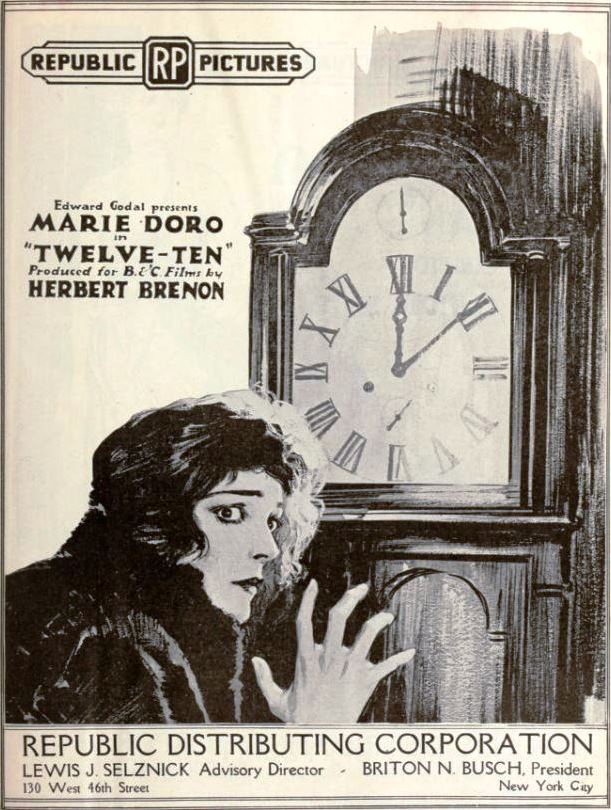
- American advertisement
- Directed by: Herbert Brenon
- Written by: Earl Carroll; George Edwardes-Hall
- Produced by: Edward Godal
- Starring: Marie Doro; Ben Webster; Geoffrey Kerr; James Carew
- Production company: British & Colonial Kinematograph Company
- Distributed by: World Films (UK); Selznick Distributing Corporation (US)
- Release date: March 1919
- Running time: 6,000 feet
- Country: United Kingdom
- Language: Silent (English intertitles)

12.10 is a 1919 British silent thriller film directed by Herbert Brenon and starring Marie Doro, Ben Webster, and Geoffrey Kerr. It was the first film made by British & Colonial Kinematograph Company which had ambitious plans to break into the American market. It was made at Walthamstow Studios, and had considerable success on its release.

== Plot ==
As described in a film magazine, Louis Fernando fails to sell a patent upon which he has spent the better part of his life and drowns himself. His orphaned child Marie is adopted by Lord Chatterton. Geoffrey Brooke, who is in the employ of Lord Chatterton, falls in love with Marie. Chatterton's general manager Arthur Newton also loves Marie and formulates a scheme whereby he hopes to win her and also acquire the Chatterton fortune. Chatterton becomes suspicious and by a ruse traps Newton and exposes his plot. Marie and Geoffrey are made happy in the end.

== Cast ==
- Marie Doro as Marie Fernando
- Ben Webster as Lord Chatterton
- Geoffrey Kerr as Geoffrey Brooke
- James Carew as Arthur Newton
- Frederick Kerr as Doctor Wrightman
- Pierre Maillard

== Bibliography ==
- Low, Rachel. The History of British Film: Volume IV, 1918–1929. Routledge, 1997.
