= Elliott Dexter =

American actor (1870–1941)

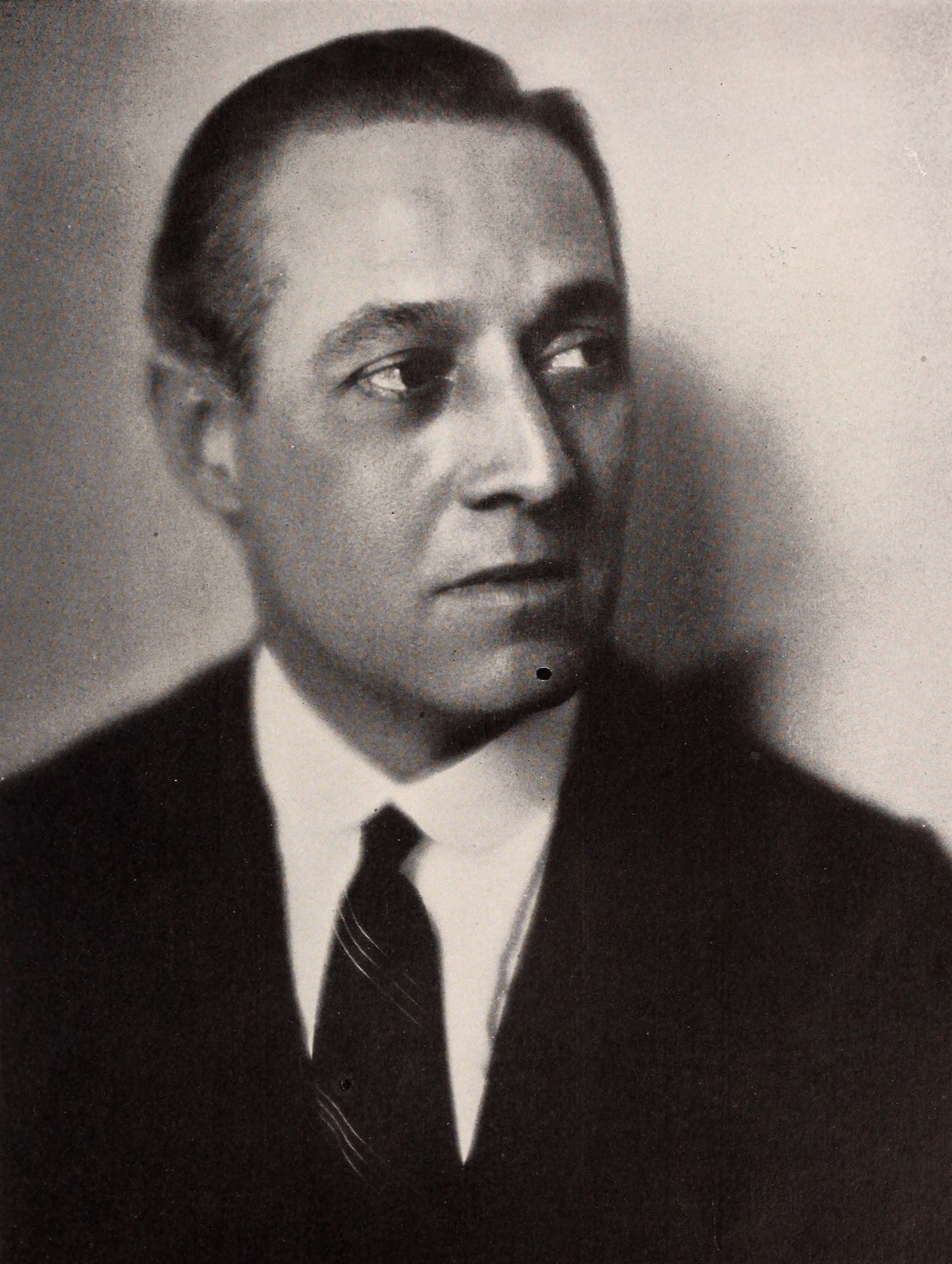
- Dexter in 1924
- Born: March 29, 1870; Galveston, Fifth Military District, U.S.
- Died: June 21, 1941 (aged 71); Amityville, New York, U.S.
- Occupation: Actor
- Years active: 1905–1925
- Spouse: Marie Doro (m. 1915; div. 1922)

Elliott Dexter (March 29, 1870 – June 21, 1941) was an American film and stage actor. He started his career in vaudeville and did not move to films until he was 45. He retired from acting in 1930.

== Biography ==
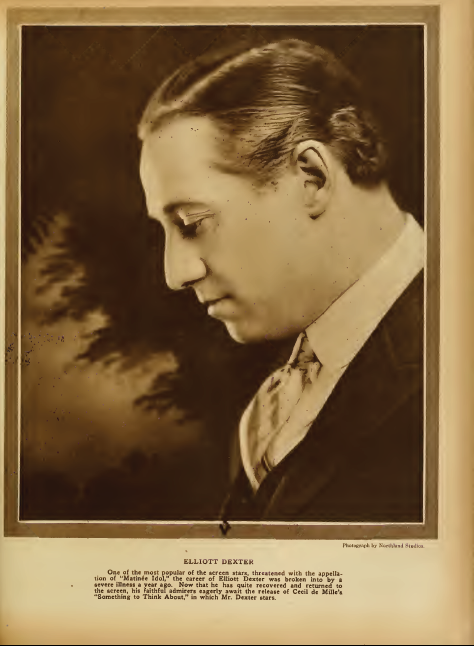
Dexter in 1920

Dexter was born in Galveston, Texas. He married silent film actress Marie Doro in 1915, but the union was brief, and the couple soon divorced without having children. He later married socialite Nina C. Untermyer in 1922. Dexter died in Amityville, New York, aged 71.

== Partial filmography ==
- Helene of the North (1915)
- The Masqueraders (1915)
- Diplomacy (1916)
- Daphne and the Pirate (1916)
- The Heart of Nora Flynn (1916)
- The American Beauty (1916)
- An International Marriage (1916)
- Public Opinion (1916)
- The Victory of Conscience (1916)
- The Lash (1916)
- The Plow Girl (1916)
- Lost and Won (1917)
- Castles for Two (1917)
- The Tides of Barnegat (1917)
- Stranded in Arcady (1917)
- A Romance of the Redwoods (1917)
- Vengeance Is Mine (1917)
- The Inner Shrine (1917)
- Sylvia of the Secret Service (1917)
- The Rise of Jennie Cushing (1917)
- The Eternal Temptress (1917)
- Woman and Wife (1918)
- The Whispering Chorus (1918)
- Old Wives for New (1918)
- We Can't Have Everything (1918)
- The Girl Who Came Back (1918)
- Women's Weapons (1918)
- The Squaw Man (1918)
- Don't Change Your Husband (1919)
- Maggie Pepper (1919)
- For Better, for Worse (1919)
- A Daughter of the Wolf (1919)
- Behold My Wife! (1920)
- Something to Think About (1920)
- The Witching Hour (1921)
- The Affairs of Anatol (1921)
- Forever (1921)
- Don't Tell Everything (1921)
- The Hands of Nara (1922)
- Grand Larceny (1922)
- Enter Madame (1922)
- An Old Sweetheart of Mine (1923)
- Adam's Rib (1923)
- Mary of the Movies (1923) - cameo
- Only 38 (1923)
- The Common Law (1923)
- Flaming Youth (1923)
- Broadway Gold (1923)
- The Spitfire (1924)
- Hello, 'Frisco (1924)
- By Divine Right (1924)
- The Fast Set (1924)
- The Age of Innocence (1924)
- The Triflers (1924)
- Capital Punishment (1925)
- Wasted Lives (1925)
- The Verdict (1925)
