= The Mysterious Princess =

1920 film

- Directed by: Herbert Brenon
- Written by: Herbert Brenon
- Starring: Marie Doro
- Cinematography: Giuseppe Filippa
- Production company: Unione Cinematografica Italiana
- Distributed by: Unione Cinematografica Italiana
- Release date: September 1920
- Countries: Italy; United States
- Languages: Silent; Italian intertitles

The Mysterious Princess (Italian: Principessa Misteriosa) is a 1920 American-Italian silent film directed by Herbert Brenon and starring Marie Doro.

== Cast ==
- Marie Doro
- Alberto Capozzi
- Angelo Gallina
- Alfredo Bertone
- Silvana
- Iole Gerli
- Marcella Sabbatini
- Antonietta Zanone
- Gerardo Peña
- Egle Valery
- C. Gonnelli
- Amilcare Giorgi
- Isabel De Lizaso
- Michele Biancardi
- Giuseppe Santelia
- Signor Florini

== Bibliography ==
- Phillips, Alastair & Vincendeau, Ginette. Journeys of Desire: European Actors in Hollywood. British Film Institute, 2006.
