= A Stubborn Cinderella =

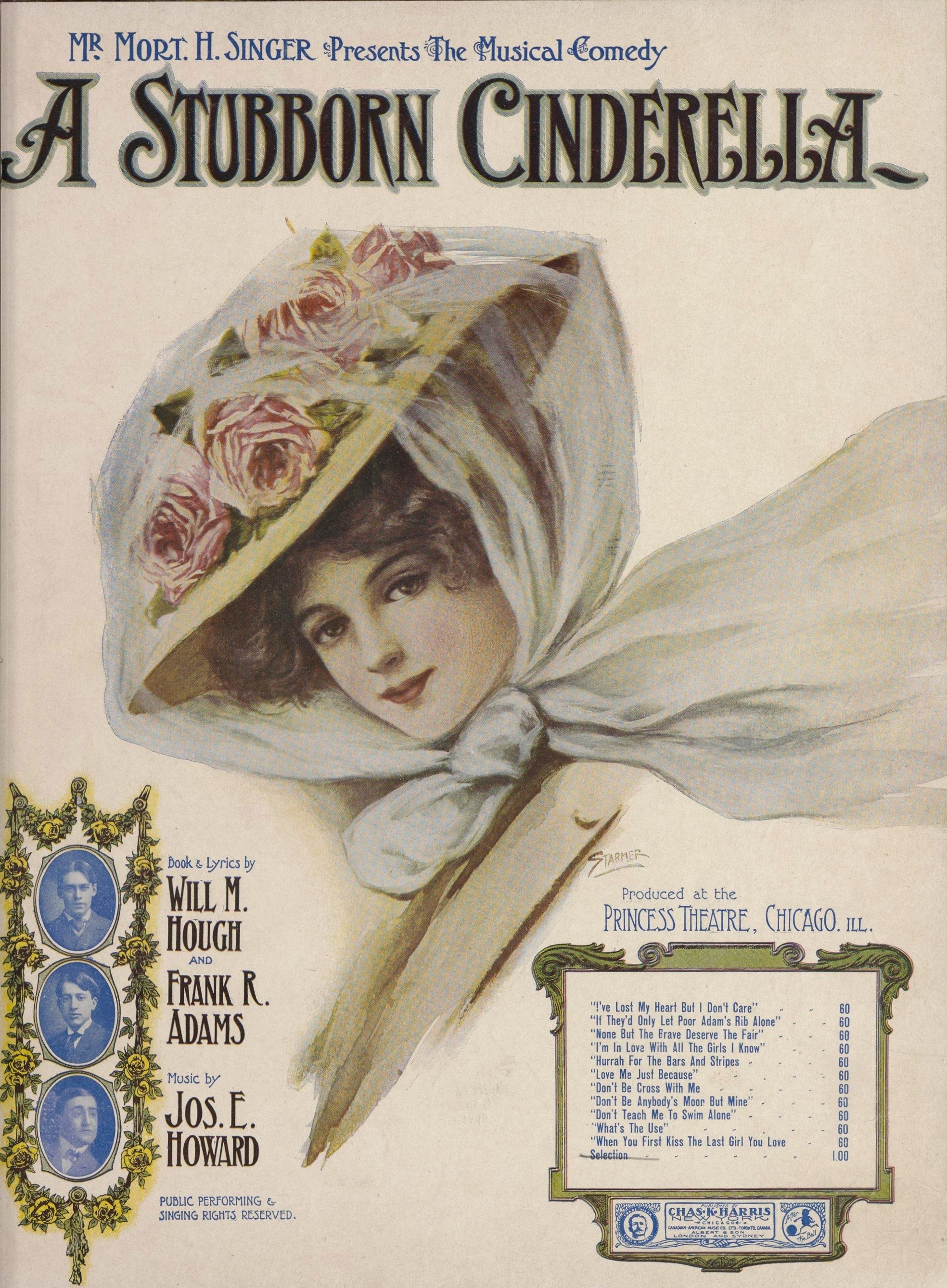
- Music: Joseph E. Howard
- Lyrics: William M. Hough; Frank R. Adams
- Book: William M. Hough; Frank R. Adams
- Productions: 1909 Broadway

A Stubborn Cinderella is a musical in three acts with music by Joseph E. Howard, and book and lyrics co-written by William M. Hough and Frank R. Adams. A reinvention of the classic Cinderella folk tale, the plot is a spoof on American college life during the early 20th century. The musical is set at a fictional Columbus University in the United States, a Mountain Wilderness near the Mexican Border, and at a beach in Coronado, California.

A Stubborn Cinderella premiered at the Alhambra Theater in Milwaukee, Wisconsin on May 24 1908. The production then moved to Chicago where it played for the grand opening of the newly built Princess Theatre at 319 S. Clark St. After an extensive run in Chicago, the production moved to New York City where it opened at the Broadway Theatre on January 25, 1909 and played for 88 performances. The Broadway production was produced by Mort H. Singer Jr. and staged by George Marion. Arthur Pell served as the musical director, and the scenic design were by Frank E. Gates and Edward A. Morange.

== Opening night cast ==
- John Barrymore – Mac
- Dorothy Brenner – Sallie
- Alice Dovey – Lois
- Sallie Fisher – Lady Leslie, daughter of the Earl of Glenkirk
- Robert Harrington – Skeeter
- James C. Marlowe – Colonel Hunt, of the visiting English party
- Charles Prince – Fat
- Clarence Lutz – Grid
- Don Merrifield – The President/an Indian
- Charles Rankin – Thaddeus Leonardo, a famous sculptor
- Helen Salinger – Lady Evelyn, Lady Leslie's aunt

== Songs ==
Act I

- "Love Me Just Because" – Lois and Chorus
- "Don't Be Cross with Me" – Lady Leslie and Chorus
- "I'm in Love with All the Girls I Know" – Skeeter and Chorus

Act 2

- "None But the Brave Deserve the Fair" – Colonel Hunt and Chorus
- "The Land of the Sky"
- "Adios, Senorita" – Sallie and Chorus
- "Don't Be Anybody's Moon But Mine" – Lois and Chorus

Act 3

- "Don't Teach Me to Swim Alone" – Sallie and Chorus
- "If They'd Only Let Poor Adam's Rib Alone" – Mac, Colonel Hunt, Skeeter and Fat
- "The Orange Fete" – Ensemble
- "When You First Kiss the Last Girl You Love" – Lady Leslie

I've Lost My Heart, but I Don't Care
A 1908 recording of a song from the show
