= A Sinless Sinner =

1919 film

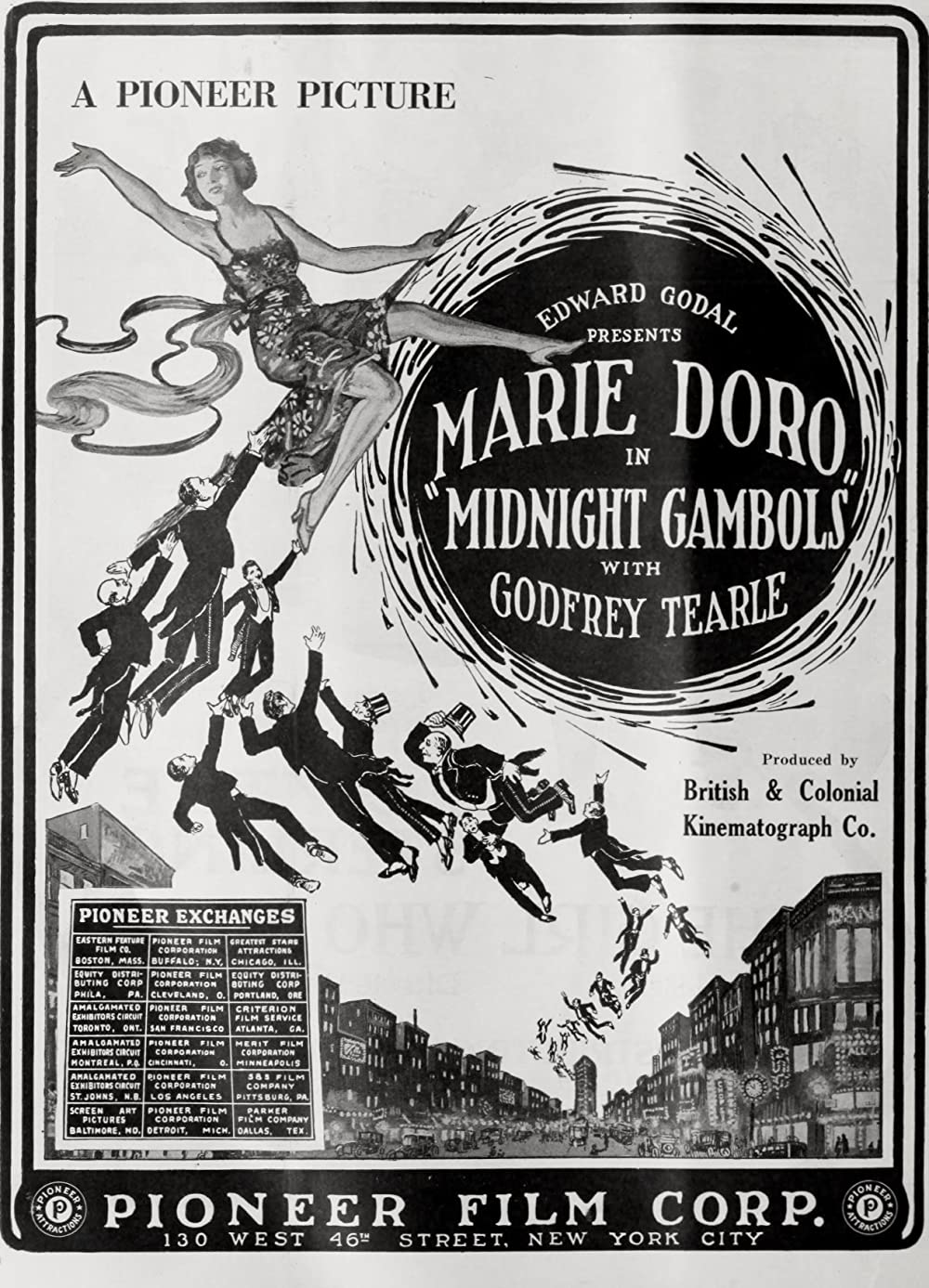
- American poster
- Directed by: James C. McKay
- Written by: George Edwardes-Hall
- Starring: Marie Doro; Godfrey Tearle; Sam Livesey
- Production company: British & Colonial Kinematograph Company
- Distributed by: World Film; Pioneer Film Corporation (US)
- Release date: August 1919
- Country: United Kingdom
- Languages: Silent; English intertitles

A Sinless Sinner is a 1919 British silent drama film directed by James C. McKay and starring Marie Doro, Godfrey Tearle and Sam Livesey. It was distributed in the United States the following year under the alternative title Midnight Gambols. It is now considered a lost film.

== Cast ==
- Marie Doro as Irene Hendon
- Godfrey Tearle as Tom Harvey
- Sam Livesey as Sam Stevens
- Mary Jerrold as Mary Hendon
- Christine Maitland as Helen Legrande
- Gladys Ffolliott as Martha McBain
- Gordon Begg as Dr. Norton

== Bibliography ==
- Low, Rachael. The History of the British Film 1918-1929. George Allen & Unwin, 1971.
