= Little Sister (1921 film) =

1921 film by Herbert Brenon

- Directed by: Herbert Brenon
- Starring: Marie Doro
- Cinematography: Giuseppe Filippa
- Production company: Herbert Brenon Film Corporation
- Distributed by: Herbert Brenon Film Corporation
- Release date: 1921
- Country: Italy
- Languages: Silent; Italian intertitles

Little Sister (Italian: Il colchico e la rosa) is a 1921 Italian silent film directed by Herbert Brenon and starring Marie Doro.

== Cast ==
- Mina D'Orvella
- Marie Doro
- Angelo Gallina
- Mimi
- Marcella Sabbatini
- Sandro Salvini

== Bibliography ==
- Phillips, Alastair & Vincendeau, Ginette. Journeys of Desire: European Actors in Hollywood. British Film Institute, 2006.
