= Lightning (1927 film) =

1927 film

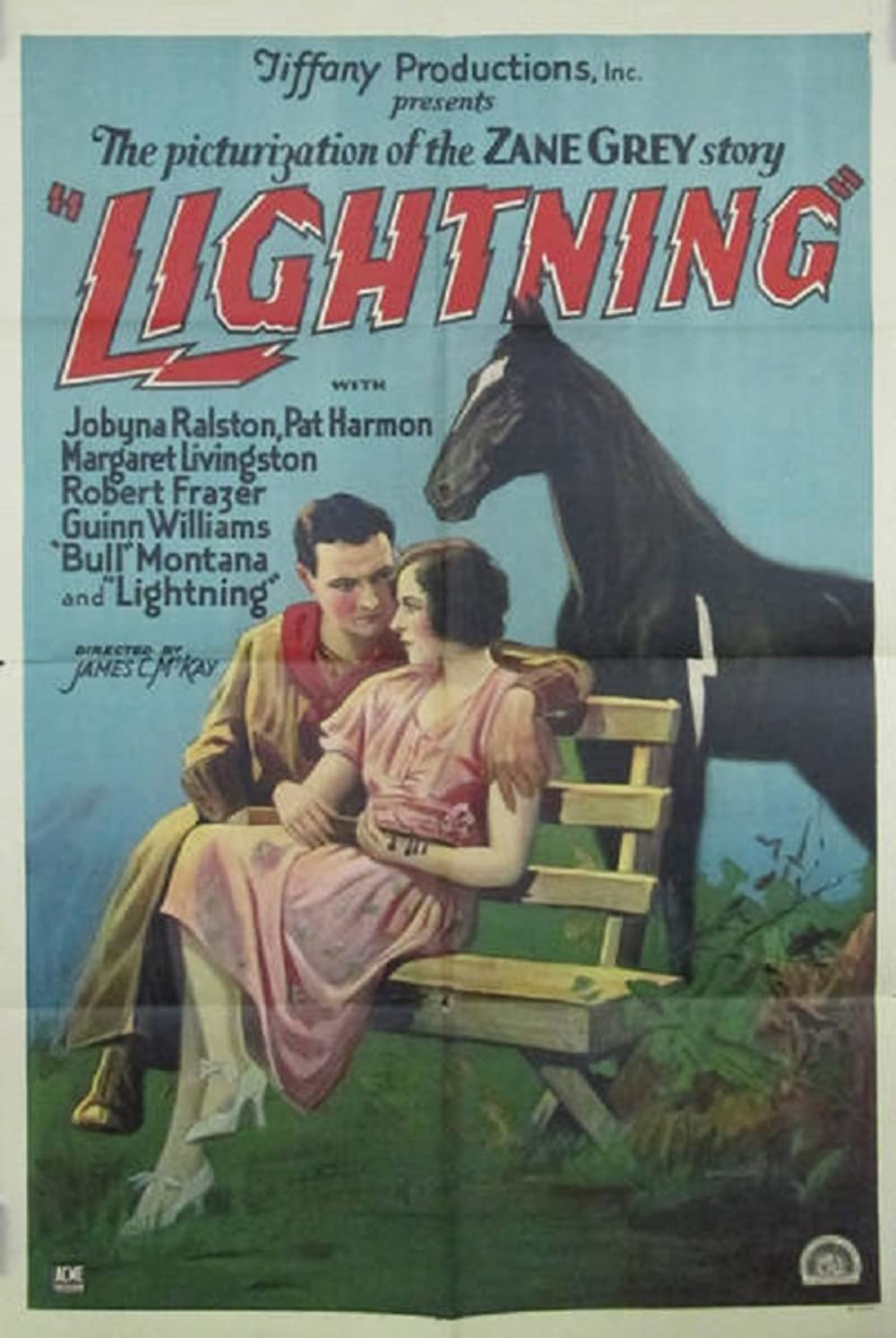
- Film poster
- Directed by: James C. McKay
- Written by: Jack Natteford
- Based on: "Lightning" by Zane Grey
- Starring: Jobyna Ralston; Robert Frazer; Margaret Livingston
- Cinematography: George Stevens; E. Fox Walker; Winney Wenstrom
- Edited by: Leroy O. Lodwig
- Production company: Tiffany Pictures
- Distributed by: Tiffany Pictures
- Release date: July 15, 1927
- Running time: 70 minutes
- Country: United States
- Language: Silent (English intertitles)

Lightning is a 1927 American silent Western film directed by James C. McKay and starring Jobyna Ralston, Robert Frazer, and Margaret Livingston. It is based on a short story of the same title by Zane Grey.

== Cast ==
- Jobyna Ralston as Mary Warren / Topsy
- Robert Frazer as Lee Stewart
- Margaret Livingston as Dot Deal
- Guinn 'Big Boy' Williams as Cuth Stewart
- Pat Harmon as 'Simon'
- Lightning the Horse as Lightning the Horse
- Lady Bess as Lady Bess the Horse

== Preservation ==
With no prints of Lightning located in any film archives, it is a lost film.

== Bibliography ==
- Connelly, Robert B. The Silents: Silent Feature Films, 1910-36, Volume 40, Issue 2. December Press, 1998.
- Munden, Kenneth White. The American Film Institute Catalog of Motion Pictures Produced in the United States, Part 1. University of California Press, 1997.
