= Diplomacy (1916 film) =

1916 silent film drama directed by Sidney Olcott

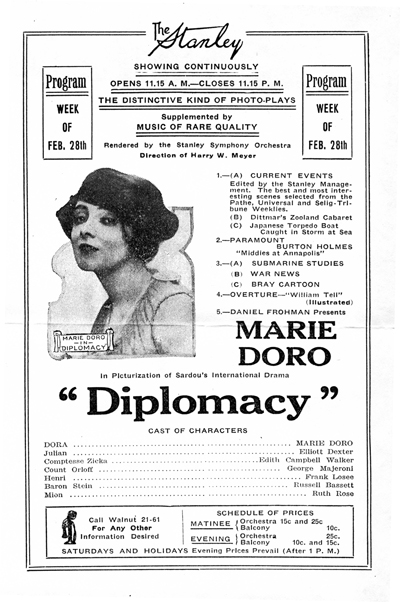
- Directed by: Sidney Olcott
- Written by: Hugh Ford (scenario)
- Based on: Diplomacy by Victorien Sardou
- Produced by: Adolph Zukor
- Starring: Marie Doro
- Cinematography: Hal Young
- Distributed by: Paramount Pictures
- Release date: February 27, 1916
- Running time: 50 minutes; 5 reels
- Country: United States
- Language: Silent film (English intertitles)

Diplomacy is a 1916 American silent drama film produced by the Famous Players Film Company and distributed by Paramount Pictures. It is based on the 1878 stage play Diplomacy, adapted from the French play Dora (1877) by Victorien Sardou, which had enjoyed revivals and road shows for decades. This film stars Doro reprising her 1914 Broadway revival role. The film is now lost with just a fragment, 1 reel, remaining at the Library of Congress.

The story was filmed again in 1926 as Diplomacy by Paramount with Blanche Sweet starring and her then husband Marshall Neilan directing.

== Cast ==
- Marie Doro - Dora
- Elliott Dexter - Julian Beauclerc
- Edith Campbell - Comtesse Zicka(*as Edith Campbell Walker)
- George Majeroni - Count Orloff
- Frank Losee - Henri Beauclerc
- Russell Bassett - Baron Stein
- Ruth Rose - Mion
