= Lost and Won (1917 film) =

1917 film

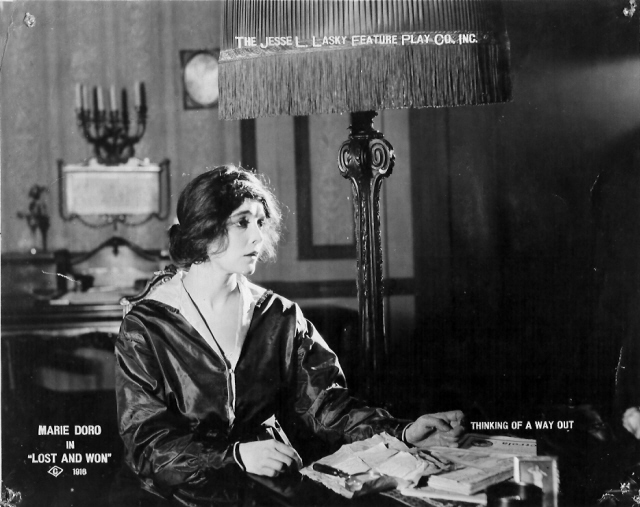
- Scene from the film
- Directed by: James Young
- Written by: Channing Pollock (story: Cinders); Margaret Turnbull; Rennold Wolf (story: Cinders)
- Produced by: Jesse L. Lasky
- Starring: Marie Doro
- Cinematography: Paul P. Perry
- Production company: Jesse L. Lasky Feature Play Company
- Distributed by: Famous Players–Lasky Corporation
- Release date: January 22, 1917
- Running time: 50 minutes
- Country: United States
- Language: Silent with English intertitles

Lost and Won is a 1917 American silent drama film directed by James Young. It is preserved at the Library of Congress.

== Cast ==
- Marie Doro as Cinders
- Elliott Dexter as Walter Crane
- Carl Stockdale as Kirkland Gaige
- Mayme Kelso as Cleo Duvene
- Robert Gray as Bill Holt
- Clarence Geldart (as C. H. Geldart)
- Mabel Van Buren
