= The Broken Gate (1927 film) =

1927 silent film

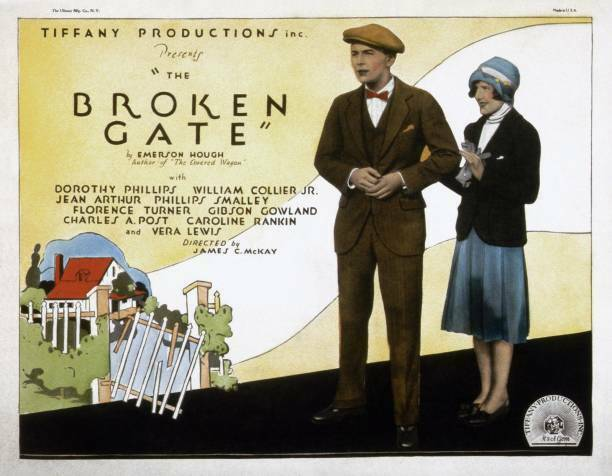
- Directed by: James C. McKay
- Written by: Jack Natteford
- Based on: The Broken Gate by Emerson Hough
- Starring: Dorothy Phillips; William Collier Jr. Jean Arthur
- Cinematography: Joseph A. Du Bray; Stephen S. Norton
- Edited by: Merrill G. White
- Production company: Tiffany Pictures
- Distributed by: Tiffany Pictures
- Release date: February 15, 1927
- Running time: 60 minutes
- Country: United States
- Languages: Silent; English intertitles

The Broken Gate is a lost 1927 American silent drama film directed by James C. McKay and starring Dorothy Phillips, William Collier Jr. and Jean Arthur. It was produced and distributed by Tiffany Pictures.

This film is a remake of a 1920 lost film The Broken Gate.

== Cast ==
- Dorothy Phillips as Aurora Lane
- William Collier Jr. as Don Lane
- Jean Arthur as Ruth Hale
- Phillips Smalley as Judge Lucius Henderson
- Florence Turner as Miss Julia
- Gibson Gowland as Ephraim Adamson
- Charles A. Post as Johnny Adamson
- Caroline Rankin as Mrs. Ephraim Adamson
- Vera Lewis as Invalid
- Jack McDonald as Sheriff Dan Cummins
- Charles Thurston as Constable Joe Tarbush
- Adele Watson as Gossip

== Bibliography ==
- Connelly, Robert B. The Silents: Silent Feature Films, 1910-36, Volume 40, Issue 2. December Press, 1998.
- Munden, Kenneth White. The American Film Institute Catalog of Motion Pictures Produced in the United States, Part 1. University of California Press, 1997.
