= Marie Doro =

American actress (1882–1956)

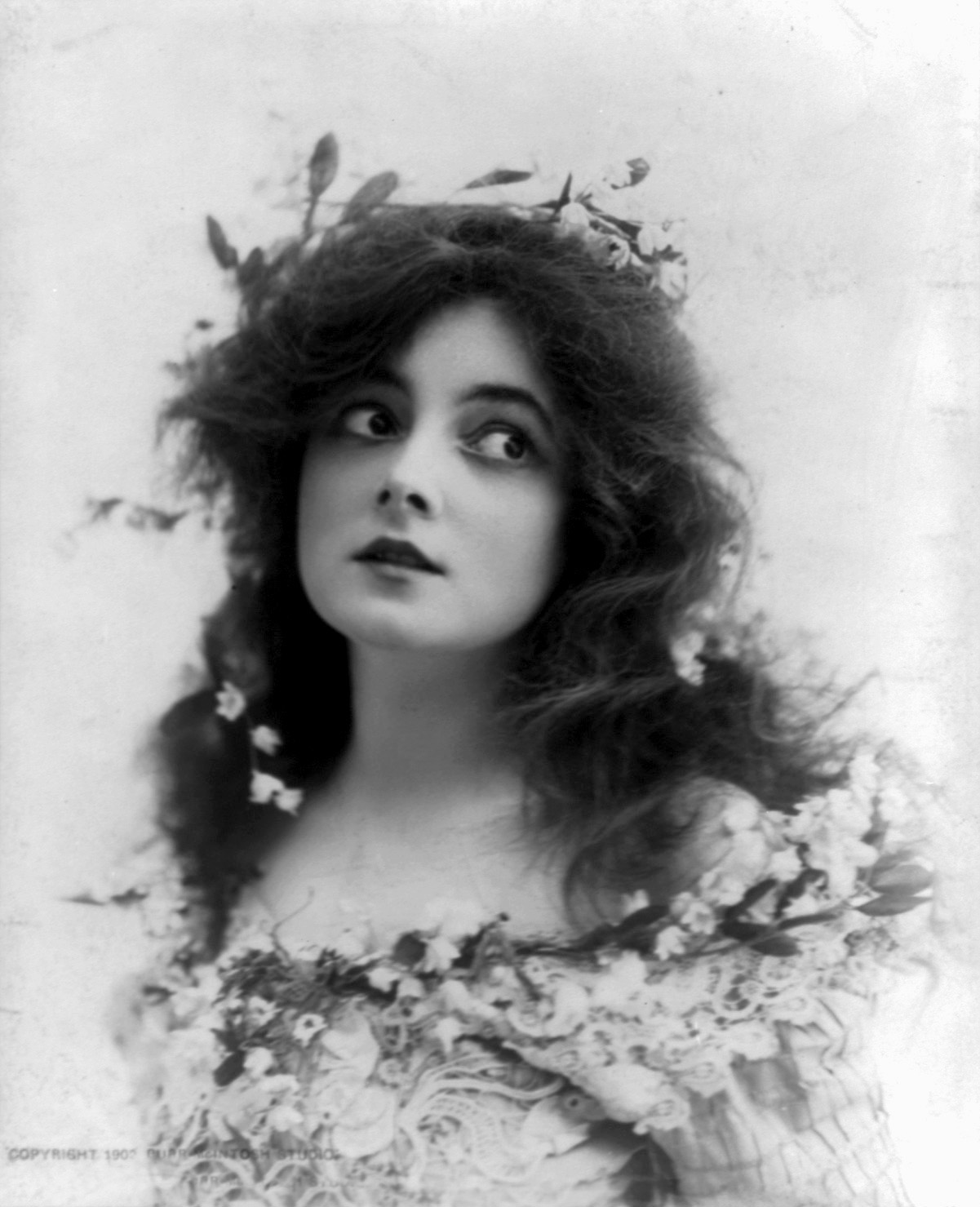
- Doro, c. 1902
- Born: Marie Katherine Stewart; May 25, 1882; Duncannon, Pennsylvania, U.S.
- Died: October 9, 1956 (aged 74); New York City, U.S.
- Occupation: Actress
- Spouse: Elliott Dexter (m. 1915; div. 1922)

Marie Doro (born Marie Katherine Stewart; May 25, 1882 – October 9, 1956) was an American stage and film actress of the early silent film era.

She was first noticed as a chorus-girl by impresario Charles Frohman, who took her to Broadway, where she also worked for William Gillette of "Sherlock Holmes fame", her early career being largely moulded by these two much-older mentors. Although generally typecast in lightweight feminine roles, she was in fact notably intelligent, cultivated and witty.

After Frohman's death on the RMS Lusitania in 1915, she moved into films, initially under contract to Adolph Zukor; most of her early movies are lost. After making a few films in Europe, she returned to America, increasingly drawn to the spiritual life, and ended as a recluse, actively avoiding friends and acquaintances.

In the early 1950s author Daniel Blum interviewed and included her in his book Great Stars of the American Stage, a homage to many theater performers, some dead, some still living at the time, like Doro. Blum wrote a quick and mostly accurate run-down of her life and career and included several portraits from her Broadway years. He also included an early-1950s photo for fans who remembered Doro, but hadn't seen her in decades.

== Biography ==
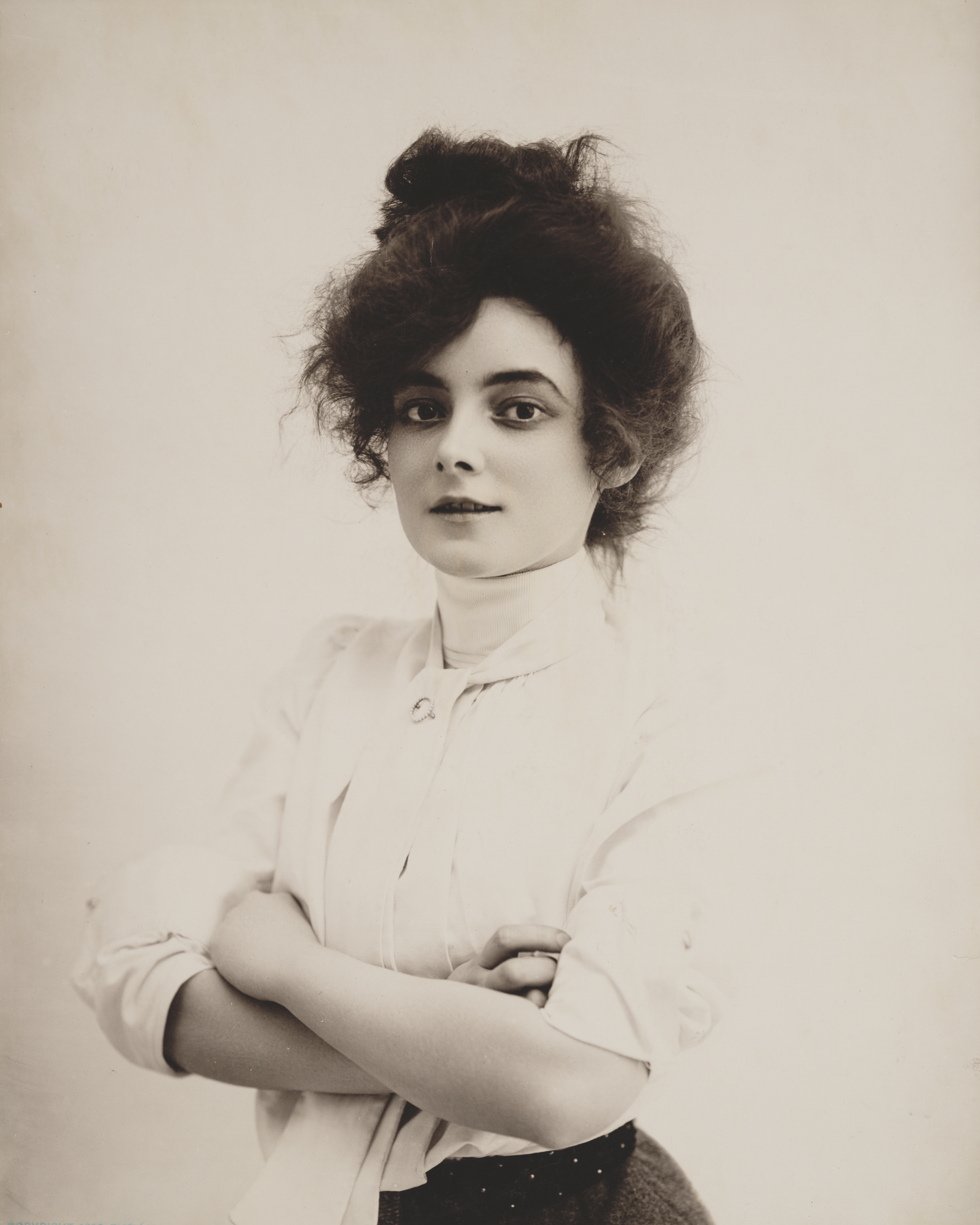
Marie Doro in 1902

Marie Katherine Stewart was born to Richard Henry Stewart and Virginia Weaver in Duncannon, Pennsylvania on May 25, 1882, and began her career as a theater actress under the management of Charles Frohman before progressing to motion pictures in 1915, under contract with film producer Adolph Zukor.

She was married to the vaudeville and silent screen actor Elliott Dexter, with the marriage ending in divorce after seven years. The marriage produced no children and Doro never remarried.

Her name was linked over the years to much older William Gillette of Sherlock Holmes fame, who was consistently linked by the press with his leading ladies. The two appeared in The Admirable Crichton in 1903, in which the young Doro had a small part, Clarice and Sherlock Holmes in 1905–06, and Diplomacy in 1914. She also starred in Gillette's 1910 production of Electricity.

On a tour of England, she acted with the unknown teenage Charlie Chaplin, who was besotted with her. Later, when he was famous, they met in America, but she had to confess that she had no memory of him.

Doro was described by drama critic William Winter as "a young actress of piquant beauty, marked personality and rare expressiveness of countenance."

Lowell Thomas, the traveler, writer, and broadcaster, knew Doro well, saying that "her fragile-looking type of pulchritude caused her to be cast in usually insipid, pretty-pretty roles." Offstage, she was intelligent, an expert on Shakespeare and Elizabethan poetry, and possessed a penetrating humor and a sometimes acid wit. "She became associated with Gillette quite early in her career and he, a man of strong and powerful mind, exercised considerable influence over her development."

As she later admitted, "For years I was hypnotized by two men—Frohman and William Gillette."

== Career ==
Like many other young women, Doro started out in the chorus in musical comedy productions, finally performing as a single character in a program in San Francisco in 1903. From there she went to New York, appeared as Rosella Peppercorn in The Billionaire which starred Jerome Sykes, and as Nancy Lowly in The Girl From Kays.

She caught the eye of Frohman, who saw in her distinct possibilities for stardom and cast her as Lady Millicent in James M. Barrie's Little Mary, which opened at the Empire Theater on January 4, 1904. Later that year, she played the ingenue Dora in Mrs. G. H. Gilbert's farewell tour of Clyde Fitch's play, Granny. The play was well received in New York but, four days after its Chicago opening, on December 2, 1904, Gilbert died at the age of 83.

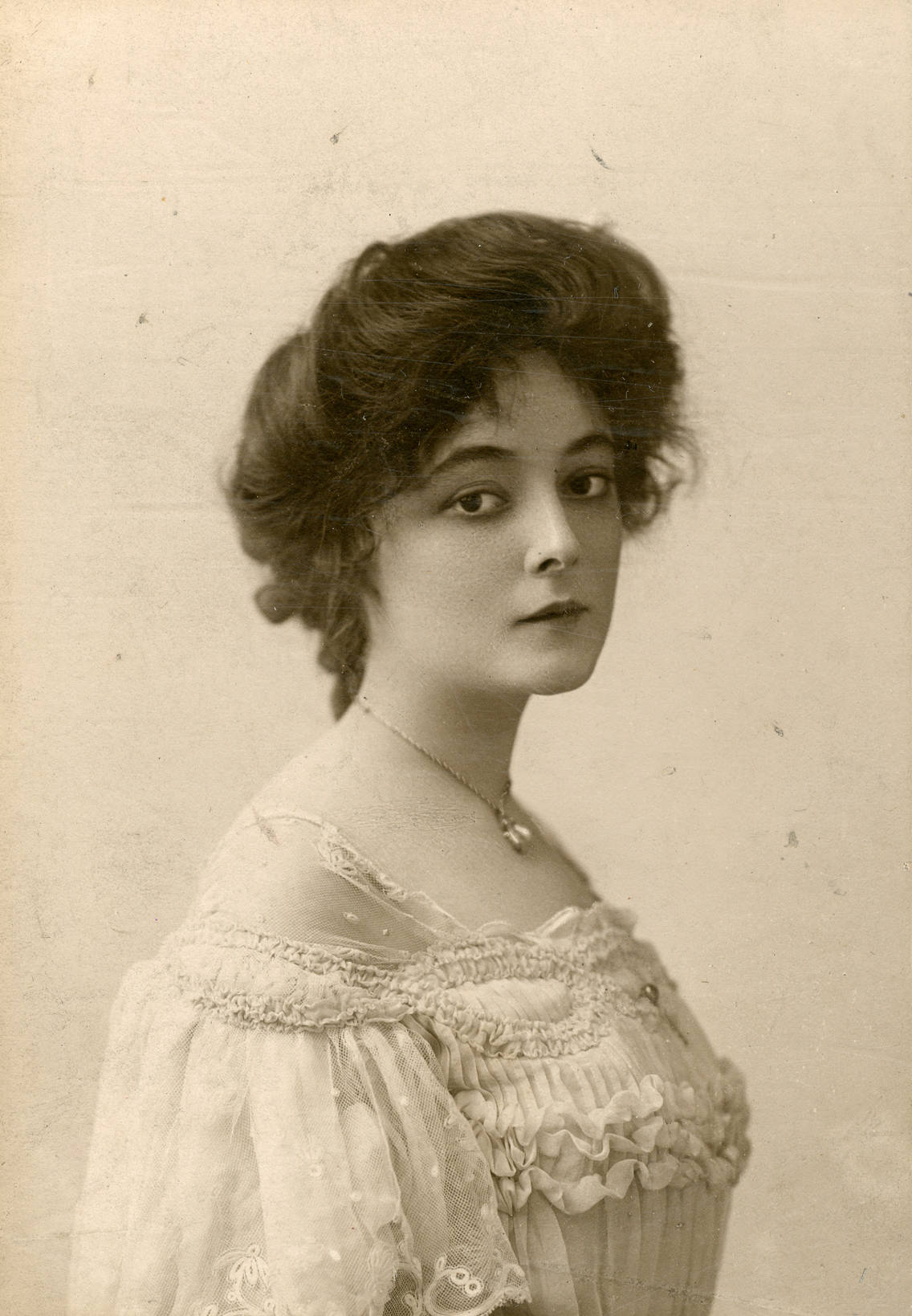
Doro in 1906.

The following January, Doro created the title role of Friquet at the Savoy, and it was William Collier's company, performing The Detective, that took her to London later that year. After The Detective closed, Frohman cast her in the heroine's role in Gillette's Clarice, a role she filled for the next two years.

Doro then appeared in The Morals of Marcus, followed in March 1909 by The Richest Girl, and in 1910, in Gillette's Electricity. In 1912, with her career on the rise, she joined Nat C. Goodwin, Lyn Harding, and Constance Collier in a dramatization of Charles Dickens' Oliver Twist, playing the title character. The same year, she appeared with De Wolf Hopper in an all-star production of Gilbert and Sullivan's opera Patience. She played opposite Charles Terry in The New Secretary in 1913, and the following year joined Gillette in Diplomacy.

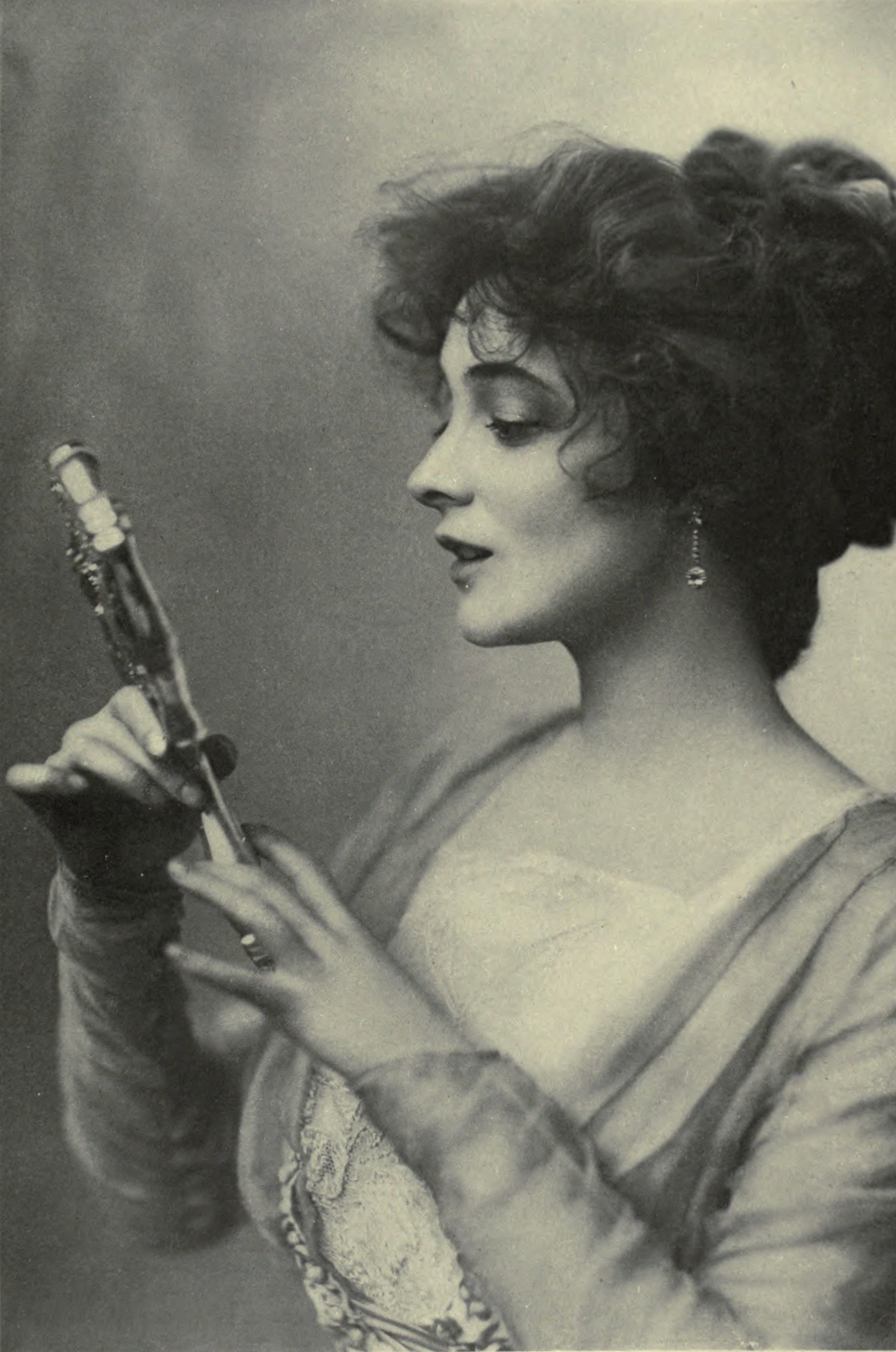
Theatre Magazine pub. 1913

Doro's stage career ended with Frohman's death on the Lusitania in 1915, after which she made eighteen motion pictures and achieved several milestones, including an appearance in the first presentation of 3D films for a paying audience.

Her 1915 film debut for Zukor's Famous Players studio was the starring role in the now lost feature film The Morals of Marcus, based on the 1907 Broadway play in which she had starred. The following year, she reprised her 1912 role in a film version of Oliver Twist. Throughout the 1910s, Doro remained a highly respected and popular leading lady. Most of her earliest screen appearances are now lost. One of the few to survive is 1917's Lost and Won.

By the early 1920s Doro became increasingly disillusioned with Hollywood and her acting career. She returned to the Broadway stage one last time in 1921 with Josephine Drake in Lilies of the Field. She made two more feature films, the last of them being Sally Bishop, but left Hollywood in 1924. She relocated to Europe for a time and made a number of films in Italy and the UK.

Returning to the United States, she became increasingly reclusive and drawn to spiritual matters. After moving to New York City, she briefly studied at the Union Theological Seminary. She spent the rest of her life in seclusion. She would often go on self-styled "retreats" in which she went to extremes to elude friends and acquaintances, even to the point of changing hotels four times a week.

== Death ==
In 1956, she died of heart failure in New York City at the age of 74. She allocated $90,000 in her will to the Actors' Fund. She was buried at the Duncannon Cemetery in her native Duncannon, Pennsylvania.

For her contributions to the motion picture industry, Marie Doro was awarded a star on the Hollywood Walk of Fame at 1725 Vine Street in Hollywood, California, U.S.

== Filmography ==
- The Morals of Marcus (1915) (Lost)
- The White Pearl (1915) (Lost)
- The Wood Nymph (1916) (Lost)
- Diplomacy (1916) (Lost)
- The Heart of Nora Flynn (1916) (Extant)
- Common Ground (1916) (Extant; British Film Institute)
- The Lash (1916) (Lost)
- Oliver Twist (1916) (Lost)
- Lost and Won (1917) (Extant; Library of Congress)
- Castles for Two (1917) (Extant; Library of Congress)
- Heart's Desire (1917) (Extant; Library of Congress)
- 12.10 (1919)
- A Sinless Sinner (1919) (Lost)
- The Mysterious Princess (1920) (Lost)
- Little Sister (1921) (Lost)
- The Stronger Passion (1921) (Lost)
- Sister Against Sister (1923) (Lost)
- Sally Bishop (1924) (Lost)
