= Common Ground (1916 film) =

1916 silent film drama by William C. deMille

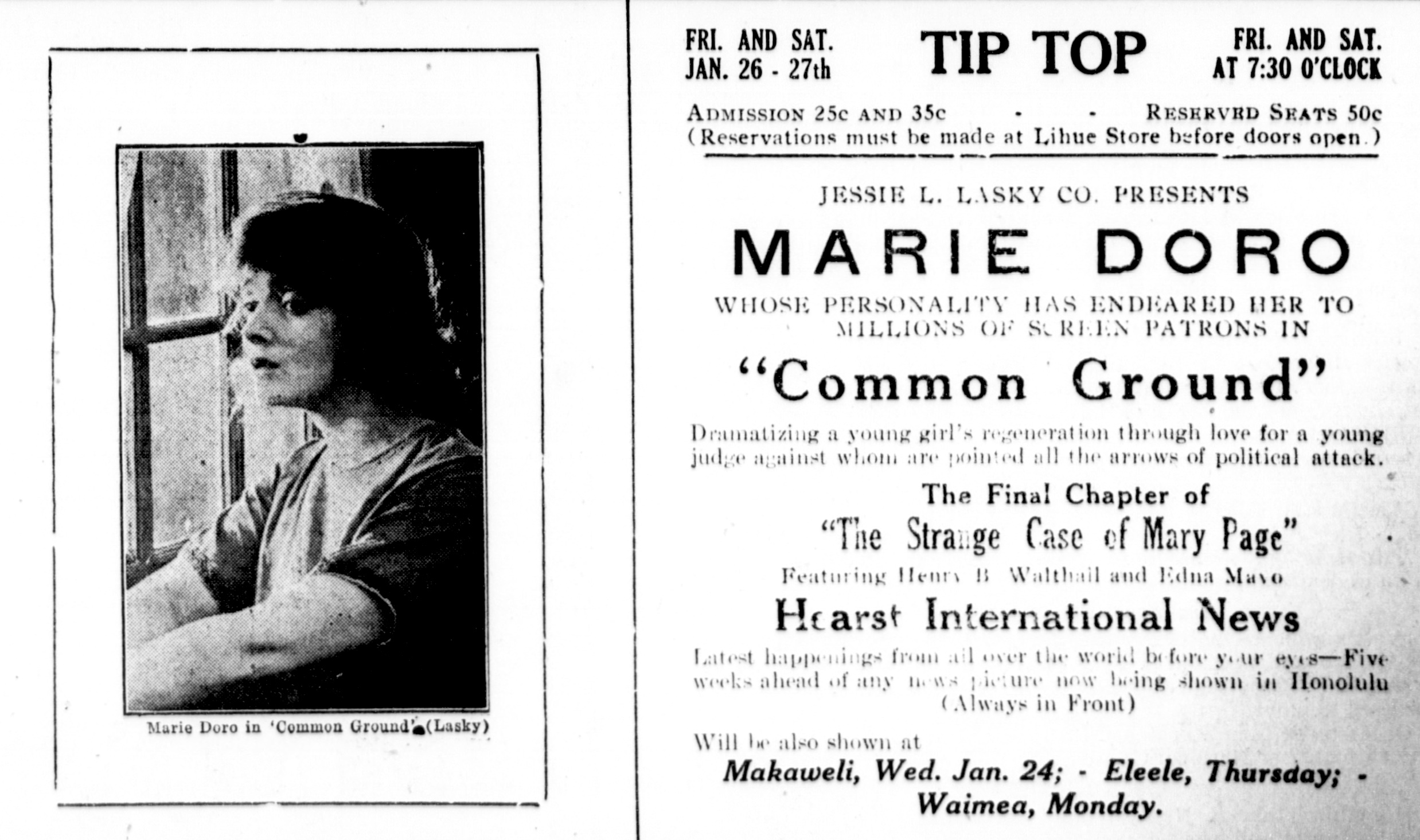
- Newspaper advertisement.
- Directed by: William C. deMille
- Written by: Marion Fairfax (story, scenario)
- Produced by: Jesse L. Lasky
- Starring: Marie Doro; Thomas Meighan
- Cinematography: Charles Rosher
- Distributed by: Paramount Pictures
- Release date: July 30, 1916
- Running time: 50 minutes; 5 reels
- Country: United States
- Language: Silent (English intertitles)

Common Ground is a 1916 American silent drama film produced by Jesse Lasky, directed by William C. deMille and distributed by Paramount Pictures. It is an original story for the screen and stars Thomas Meighan and Marie Doro. A print is held by British Film Institute National Film and Television Archive.

== Cast ==
- Marie Doro as The Kid
- Thomas Meighan as Judge David Evans
- Theodore Roberts as James Mordant
- Mary Mersch as Doris Mordant
- Horace B. Carpenter as Burke
- Florence Smythe as Mrs. Dupont
- Mrs. Lewis McCord as Housekeeper
- Dr. Keller as Jones
