= Jerome Sykes =

American actor and singer

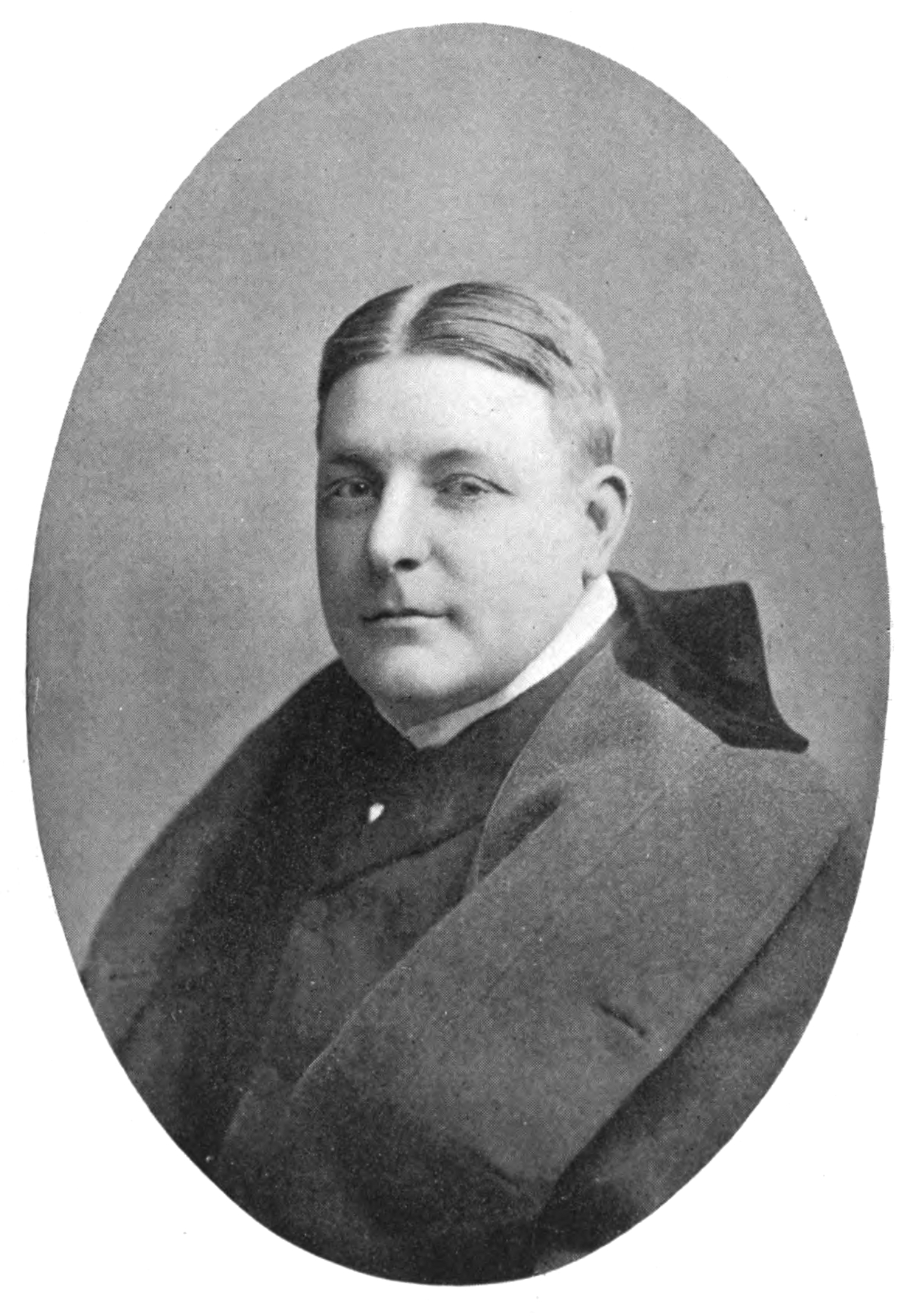
- Sykes as pictured in The Players Blue Book in 1901
- Born: Jerome H. Sykes; June 24, 1868; Washington, D. C., U.S.
- Died: December 29, 1903 (aged 35); Chicago, Illinois, U.S.
- Resting place: Green-Wood Cemetery, Brooklyn, New York City, U.S.
- Occupations: Actor, comedian
- Spouses: Agnes Sherwood; Jessie Wood

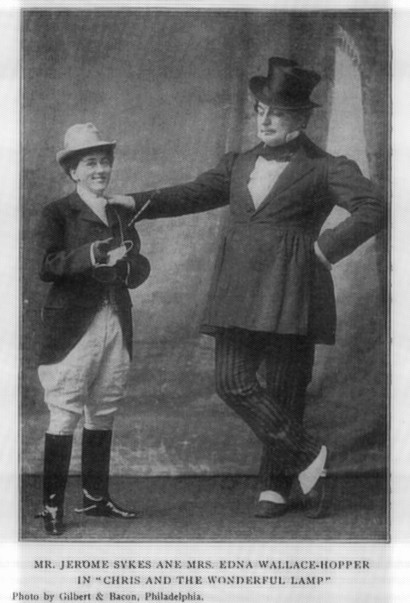
Edna Wallace Hopper and Sykes in Chris and the Wonderful Lamp

Jerome Sykes (June 24, 1868 – December 29, 1903) was an American stage actor, singer and comedian. He was perhaps best known for his performances as Foxy Quiller in two theatrical productions. His brother Albert S Sykes was also an actor.

== Early life ==
Sykes was born in Washington, D.C., under the name of Henry Karl August Seitz and grew up in a house where part of the Library of Congress now stands. He "was a member of a famous family of actors ..."

== Career ==
Sykes' professional debut came in the 1884-1885 season in a performance of The Mikado with the Ford Opera Company in Baltimore. His biggest Broadway success was The Billionaire (1902–03) which had in its cast May Robson and Sallie Fisher and was the New York debut of Marie Doro. His other Broadway credits included Foxy Quiller (In Corsica) (1900), Chris and the Wonderful Lamp (1900), and The Three Dragoons (1899).

Sykes portrayed Constable Foxy Quiller in The Highwayman, which became popular enough that it resulted in a sequel, Foxy Quiller.

== Death ==
During a party feted for Sykes and The Billionaire in Chicago, Sykes caught pneumonia while wearing too few clothes in the dead of winter, and died at 35. After his body was temporarily stored in a receiving tomb at Greenwood Cemetery, he was buried at St. James Episcopal Cemetery in St. James, New York, where his family had a summer residence for many years.

Sykes was married twice, to Agnes Sherwood, who died in 1896 and to actress Jessie Wood.
