= Robert Ober =

American actor (1881–1950)

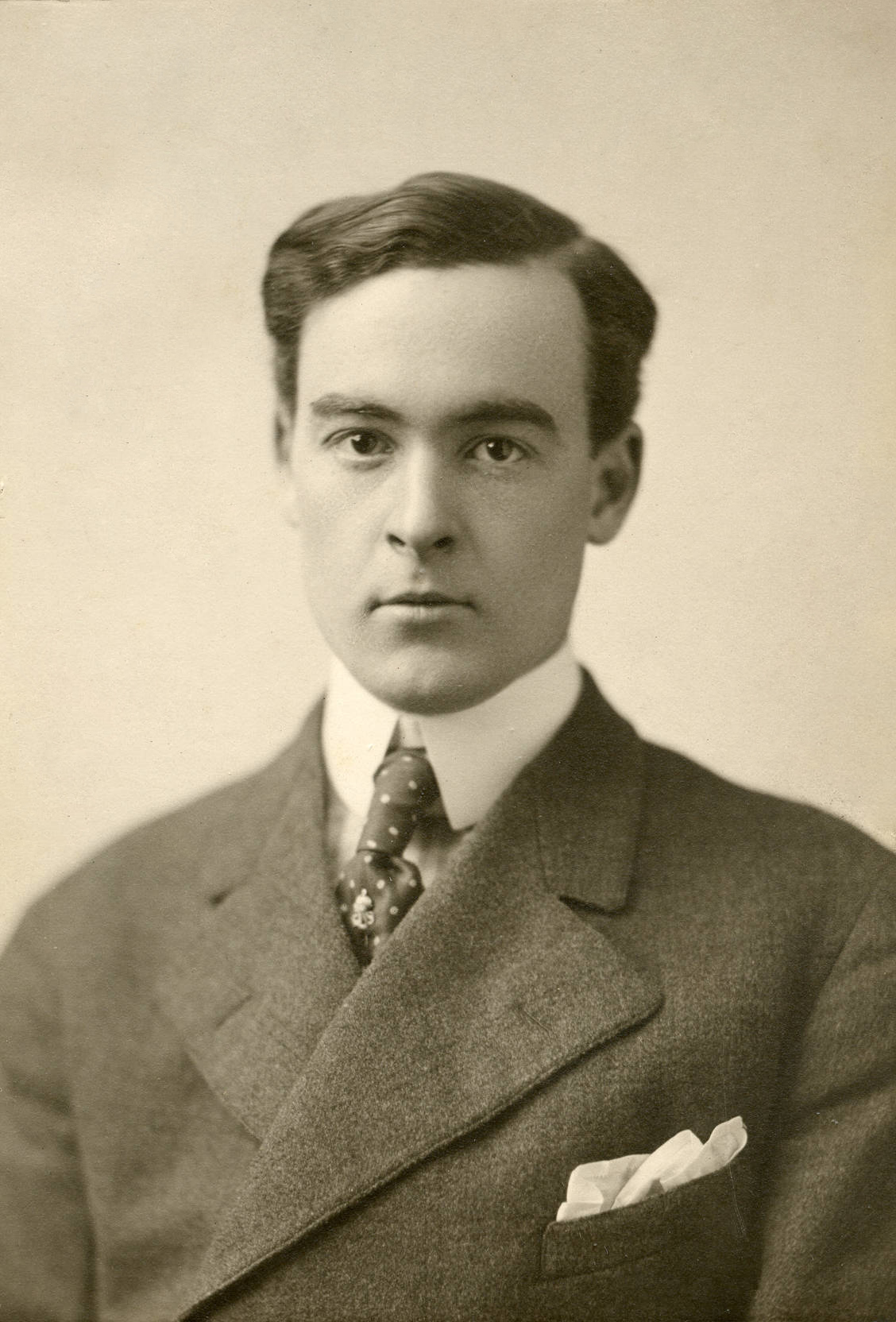
- Ober (1908)
- Born: Robert Howard Over; May 10, 1881; Bunker Hill, Illinois, U.S.
- Died: December 7, 1950 (aged 69); New York City, New York, United States
- Education: Washington University in St. Louis
- Occupation: Actor
- Spouses: Ruth Boyd (m. 1917; div. 1919) Maude Fulton (m. 1920; div. 1926): Mabel Taliaferro

Robert Howard Ober (May 10, 1881 – December 7, 1950) was an American stage and silent-screen actor.

== Early life ==
Robert Howard Ober was born on May 10, 1881, in Bunker Hill, Illinois, to parents Robert Howard Ober Sr. and Joella W. Ober (née Davis). He attended Divoll grade school in St. Louis, Missouri. He graduated from Washington University in St. Louis.

== Career ==
Ober started his theater career in St. Louis, Missouri at the Century Theatre. His first stage appearance was with the Colonel Hopkins Stock Company in the play In Mizzoura. He also played in My Friend from India and Arizona. He went on tour in the production of Madame X. He then performed with the Harry Davis Company in Pittsburgh, Pennsylvania, and then moved to New York City.

Ober appeared in The Little Gray Lady, Gallops, Brewster's Millions and Ready Money. He appeared with Fay Templeton in Forty-five Minutes from Broadway. He also appeared with Arnold Daly in You Can Never Tell and, in 1917, with Madge Kennedy in Fair and Warmer. He also appeared in You Can't Take It With You. He appeared in Maude Fulton's play The Humming Bird. He also appeared in early motion pictures.

== Filmography ==
Ober acted in the following films:

- Introduce Me (1925)
- Time, the Comedian (1925)
- Souls for Sables (1925)
- The Big Parade (1925)
- The Mystic (1925)
- Butterflies in the Rain (1926)
- The Idle Rich (1929)

== Personal life ==
Ober first married actress and lyricist Ruth Boyd in 1917. They divorced in 1919. He later married playwright and actress Maude Fulton in 1920. They divorced in 1926. He then married actress Mabel Taliaferro.

Ober died on December 7, 1950, at the age of 69, at Lenox Hill Hospital in New York City.
