= Beware of Blondes (1928 film) =

1928 film

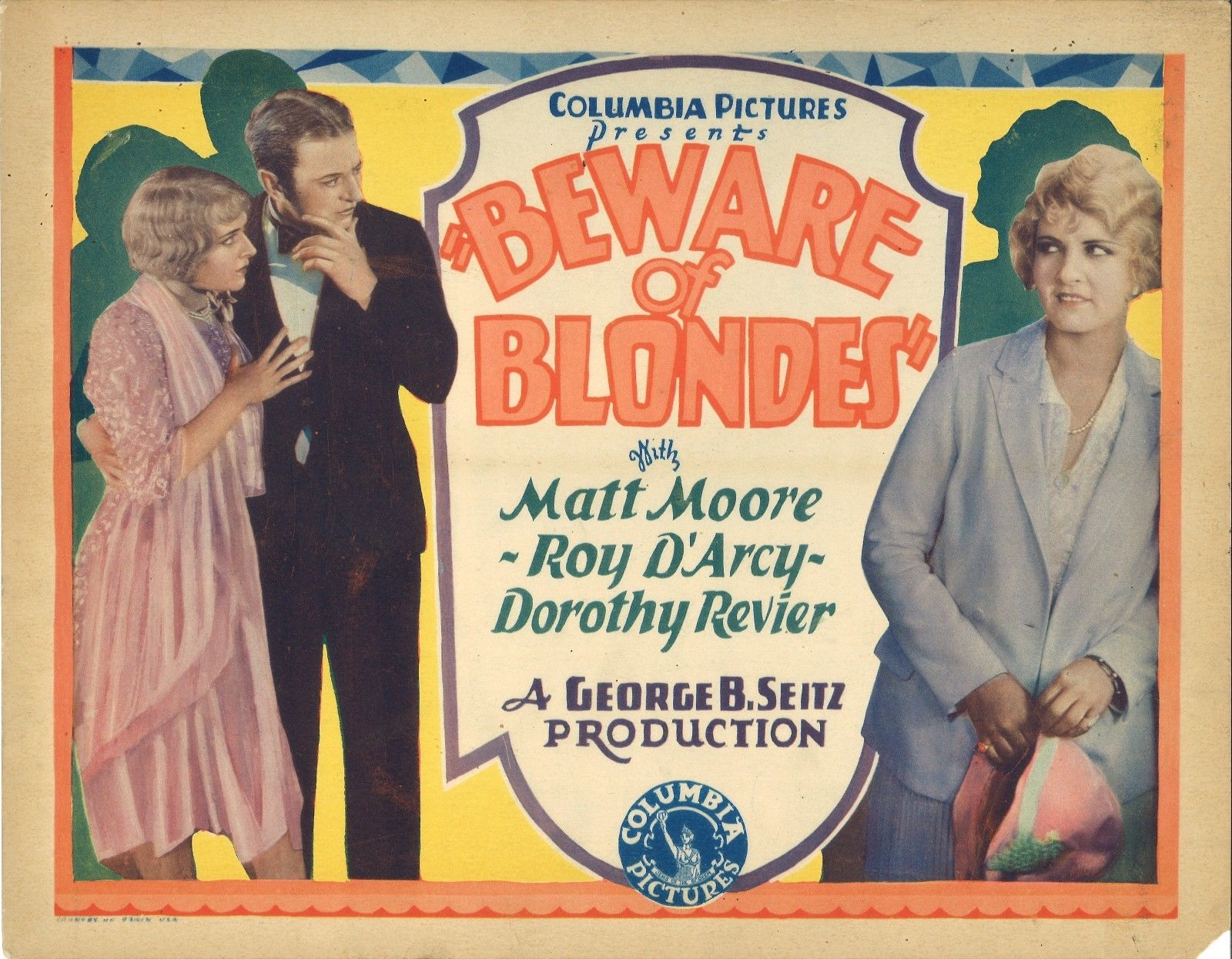
- Lobby card
- Directed by: George B. Seitz
- Written by: George C. Hull; Peter Milne
- Produced by: Harry Cohn
- Starring: Dorothy Revier
- Cinematography: Joseph Walker
- Edited by: James C. McKay
- Distributed by: Columbia Pictures
- Release date: July 1, 1928
- Running time: 59 minutes
- Country: United States
- Language: Silent (English intertitles)

Beware of Blondes is a 1928 American silent drama film directed by George B. Seitz. With no copies listed in any film archives, Beware of Blondes is now lost with a trailer surviving in the Library of Congress collection.

== Plot ==
Jeffrey wakes up one morning to find his fiancée, Mary, and his priceless emerald missing. Police eventually track the theft to the hideout of Harry in Manila, recovering the emerald and Mary, who is reunited with Jeffrey.

== Cast ==
- Dorothy Revier as Mary
- Matt Moore as Jeffrey
- Roy D'Arcy as Harry
- Robert Edeson as Costigan
- Walter P. Lewis as Tex
- Hazel Howell as Blonde Mary
- Harry Semels as Portugee Joe
