= Sallie Fisher =

American actress

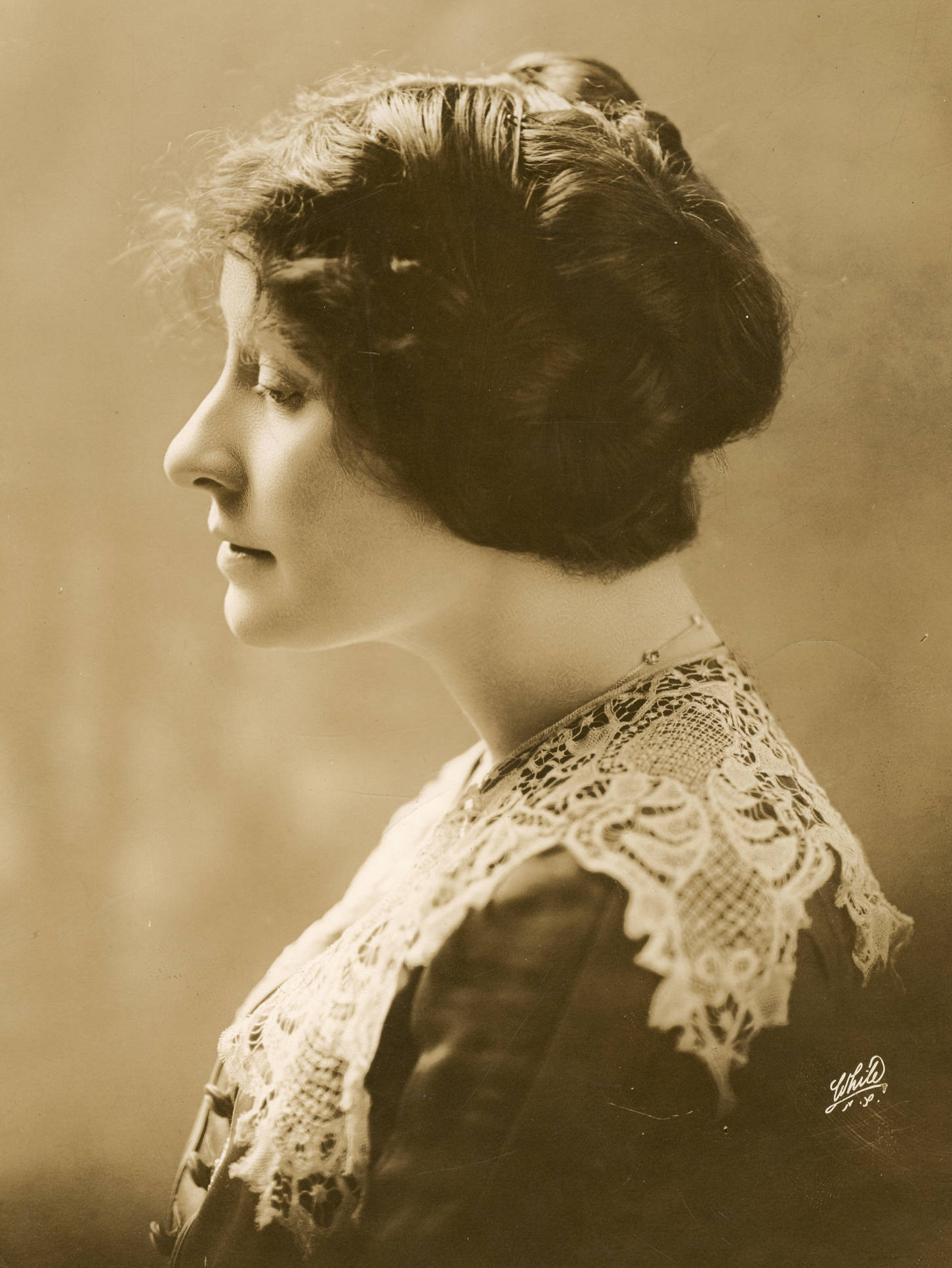
- Sallie Fisher in 1912
- Born: August 10, 1880; Wyoming Territory, U.S.
- Died: June 8, 1950 (aged 69); Twentynine Palms, California, U.S.
- Occupation: Actress
- Years active: 1902-1921
- Spouse: Arthur Houghton (m. 1913)

Sallie Fisher (August 10, 1880 – June 8, 1950) was an American stage and vaudeville actress who appeared in the 1916 silent The Little Shepherd of Bargain Row.

== Early years ==
Fisher "was born on a ranch in Wyoming" but moved with her family to Salt Lake City "when a very little girl." She was educated by tutors. (In a 1909 interview, Fisher told a reporter that she was born in Salt Lake City.)

== Stage ==
Fisher appeared in musical comedy, musical farce, fantasy, operetta, revue and revivals. She debuted in Salt Lake City with the Salt Lake Opera Company. In Chicago, "she rose from the chorus of a comic opera company to the ranks of the truly elect, otherwise known as prima donna." She portrayed Flora in the 1902 Broadway musical The Billionaire.

In 1907, an article in The Washington Post described Fisher as having been "for several seasons a prima donna in the Dillingham forces." She appeared with George M. Cohan in 45 Minutes from Broadway and with John Barrymore in Stubborn Cinderella.

A St. Louis Post-Dispatch review of the production of The Goddess of Liberty in St. Louis, Missouri, in 1910 described Fisher's work as follows: "Sallie Fisher is most of the show and she is worth while [sic]. She sings well, dances divinely and is as good to look at as one could wish."

== Personal life ==
Fisher was married to Arthur Houghton for 37 years. Houghton was a theatrical manager. After Fisher married him, she "retired at the peak of her career."

== Death ==
Fisher died of a heart attack, aged 69, at her home in Twentynine Palms, California, on June 8, 1950.
