= Herbert Brenon =

Irish-born film director (1880–1958)

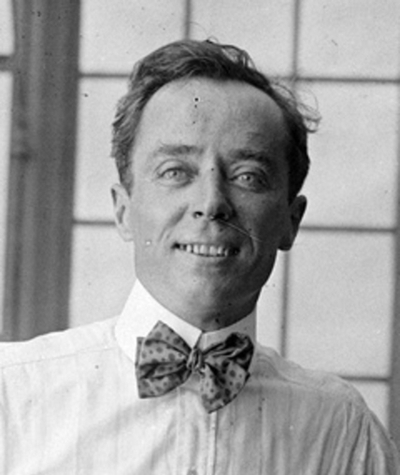
- Herbert Brenon, 1916
- Born: Alexander Herbert Reginald St. John Brenon; 13 January 1880; Kingstown, Ireland
- Died: 21 June 1958 (aged 78); Los Angeles, California, U.S.
- Education: King's College London
- Occupation: Film director
- Years active: 1911–1940
- Spouse: Helen Oberg (m. 1904–1955; her death)
- Children: 1

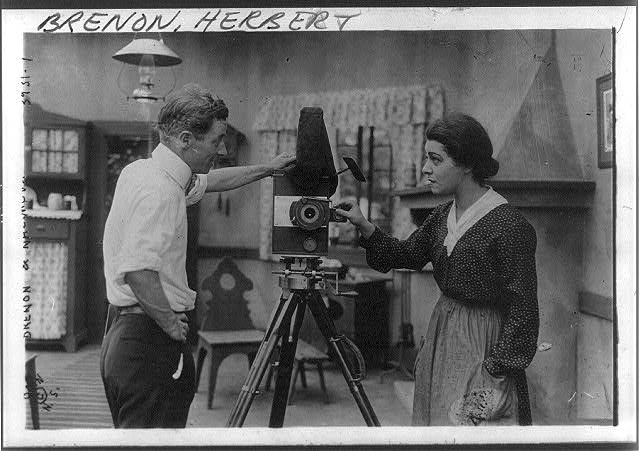
Brenon and Alla Nazimova with a camera in his studio, 9 August 1916.

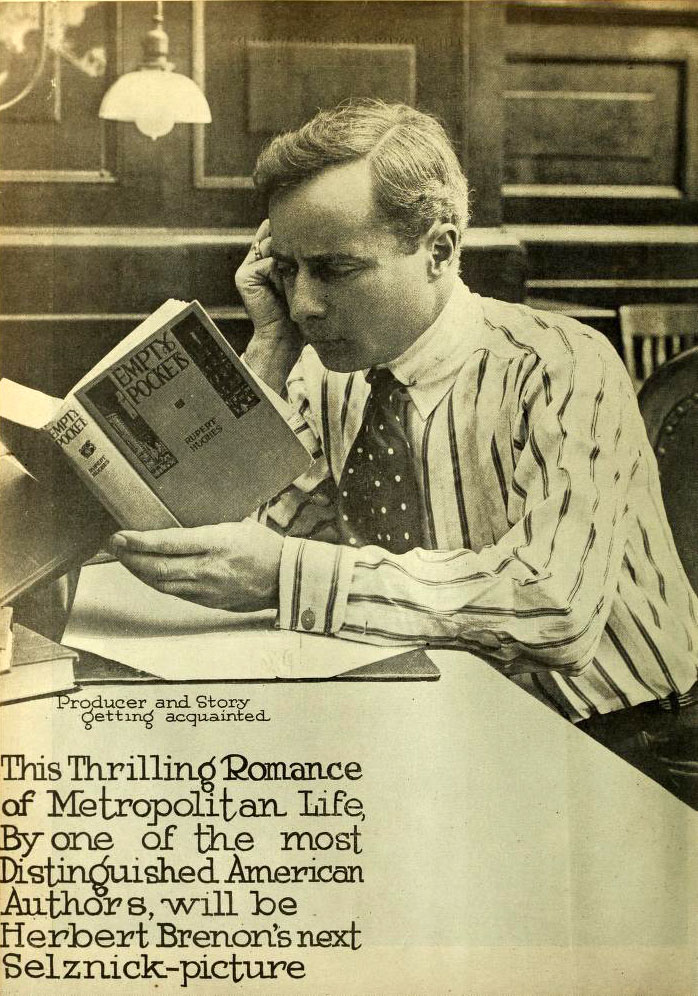
Brenon in 1917 reading Rupert Hughes' Empty Pockets

Herbert Brenon (born Alexander Herbert Reginald St. John Brenon; 13 January 1880 – 21 June 1958) was an Irish-born U.S. film director, actor and screenwriter during the era of silent films through 1940. Brenon was among the early filmmakers who, before the rise of corporate film production, was a genuine "auteur", controlling virtually all creative and technical components in crafting his pictures. The quality of Brenon's artistic output rivaled that of film pioneer D. W. Griffith.

Brenon was among the first directors to achieve celebrity status among moviegoers for his often spectacular cinematic inventions. Among his most notable films are Neptune's Daughter (1914), Peter Pan (1925), A Kiss for Cinderella (1925), and the original film version of Beau Geste (1926).

== Early life ==
Brenon was born at 25 Crosthwaite Park, in Kingstown (now Dún Laoghaire), Dublin to Edward St. John Brenon, a journalist, poet, and politician, and his wife, Frances (née Harris).

In 1882, the family moved to London, where Herbert was educated at St Paul's School and at King's College London. In 1896, at age 16, Brenon emigrated to the United States and became a naturalized U.S. citizen in 1918.

== Film career ==
In his late teens, Brenon served as an office boy for the theatrical agent Joseph Vivian and as a call boy at Daly's Theatre on Broadway. While still in his twenties, and before becoming a film director, he performed in vaudeville and operated a small-town nickelodeon.

Brenon married Helen Violette Oberg (1885-1955) on 18 February 1904 while they were both working vaudeville circuits. Their son, Herbert Cyril Brenon, was born in 1906.

=== IMP: 1909–1914 ===
At the age of 29, Brenon advanced to screenwriting and film editing for the Independent Moving Pictures Company (IMP), later to become Universal Studios. In 1911, he directed his first film, the one-reeler, All For Her (1912), starring George Ober. In 1913, he directed another short silent film, Kathleen Mavourneen, starring Jane Fearnley as the eponymous heroine.

Brenon acted in many of the films he directed for IMP, including the studio's first three-reel production Leah the Forsaken (1909), starring Leah Baird.

Brenon took his IMP production unit to Europe in 1913, and made a number of films in England, France and Germany. The most "spectacular" of these was his adaptation of Sir Walter Scott's novel Ivanhoe, starring celebrity aviator Claude Graham-White as Ivanhoe and filmed at Chepstow Castle. The journal Illustrated Films Monthly bestowed fulsome praise on the production, declaring that "Ivanhoe, as a film, will prove epoch-making in the history of cinematography in [Great Britain] and over the whole world'." Brenon proceeded to continental Europe to film Absinthe (1914) in France and several films in Germany, starring William E. Shay.

Neptune's Daughter (1914): Brenon’s final and most spectacular film for IMP studios was his 1914 Neptune’s Daughter. This Annette Kellerman vehicle, at seven-reels in length and filmed in Bermuda, established both director and actress among the earliest silent film celebrities.

Brenon left IMP In 1914 to create his own short-lived production company, Tiffany Film Corporation.

=== Fox: 1915–1916 ===
The following year, Brenon and Kellerman contracted with William Fox’s production company. There, Brenon directed actress Theda Bara in The Two Orphans (1915) and The Kreutzer Sonata (1915). Both Brenon and Bara would have a major impact in elevating the stature of the Fox Company.

A Daughter of the Gods (1915): In the summer of 1915, Brenon and leading lady from their IMP collaborations, Kellerman, travelled to Jamaica to make the “elaborate” and “spectacular” A Daughter of the Gods (1916). His extravagant expenditures filming the picture led to immense cost overruns, outraging producer William Fox. That, and Brenon's emerging celebrity status among movie critics led Fox to seize the footage and edit it himself, excising Brenon from the screen credits. Film historian Richard Koszarski describes the clash between producer and director.:

“Tales of Brenon's extravagance began to reach the ears of William Fox, and he was stunned by what he heard. A complete concrete and steel city was built on the disused island fortress of Castillo de San Marcos, Jamaica; a ‘White Fortress’ was erected at the cost of symbol for British pound £,50,000 [and] 20,000 people were said to be engaged on the picture at one time and over 223,000 feet of film were shot. The cost of the entire production was claimed to be in the neighborhood of £,200,000. Fox was furious. He ordered Brenon's name from the credits of the film, and had the film re-edited by Hettie Gray Baker. Brenon left the Fox organization after unsuccessfully contesting in court that Fox had no right to tamper with his picture.”

After his failed litigation with Fox, Brenon continued to direct films for various studios, then moved to Paramount where he made some of his finest pictures.

=== Paramount Pictures: 1923–1926 ===
Brenon reached the apogee of his creative powers while at Paramount during the late silent period, emerging as "a craftsman of the highest order" and for his renowned cinematic style.

Two films most characteristic of “the Brenon style” were his adaption of two J. M. Barrie fantasies, the highly theatrical renditions of Peter Pan (1924), starring Betty Bronson and A Kiss for Cinderella (1925). Brenon enlisted the talents of James Wong Howe and J. Roy Hunt to achieve outstanding cinematography and lighting effects. Biographer Charles Higham provides these critiques of the films:

"Peter Pan’s encouragement of kidnapping, vengeance and murder deserves a whole psychological study in itself, and Brenon’s direction brings out its viciousness in the scenes when the children slowly prod a pirate to death at sword’s point, force Captain Hook to walk a plank, or giggle at his doom in the maw of a crocodile."
"A Kiss for Cinderella celebrated materialistic acquisition with [a degree of] repulsiveness, and Brenon adds many vulgar touches to Barrie's scenes when the little London skivvy dreams of a socially successful marriage to Prince Charming, the epitome of bourgeois money-grubbing fantasy."

Film historian Richard Koszarski offers this appraisal of A Kiss for Cinderella:

"As a followup to Peter Pan (1925), Brenon filmed as adaption of ... Barrie's A Kiss for Cinderella (1926), a sophisticated fantasy that historian William K. Everson has compared to Jean Cocteau's La Belle et la Bete (1946) ... Despite extraordinary special effects, Barrie's deconstruction of the Cinderella myth - with an unhappy ending - was indeed quite unpopular with audiences..."

Perhaps Brenon's most highly successful commercial effort at Paramount was Beau Geste (1926), with actor Ronald Colman.

Richard Koszarski observes approvingly that Beau Geste is “notable for its intelligence and controlled sentiment ... especially strong in the richness of the performances.”

Film historian Charles Higham issued this appraisal of Brenon's Beau Geste:

"Brenon was at least as inflexible as the director D. W. Griffith. An Irish curmudgeon, he was prone to giving interviews denouncing studio interference and upholding the status of artists like himself. But unlike Griffith, he knew how to play the studio game…" - Film historian Richard Koszarski in Hollywood on the Hudson (2008)

"Brenon's best-made film was Beau Geste, a production into which Paramount put much effort, sending the entire unit and cast into the Mojave Desert for weeks to insure realistic results. The P. C. Wren story about courage, brotherly love, and self-sacrifice and the supposed theft of the priceless Blue Water sapphire from Lady Brandon is a constant annoyance, but Brenon’s handling, replete with all the sadistic relish of his 1925 Peter Pan, is more cinematically interesting then usual."

== Style and personality ==
Brenon's reputation as a director who reliably extracted fine performances from "temperamental" actors was widely acknowledged. Indeed, Brenon praised the virtues of “temperament” in an article from Motion Picture Magazine (February 1926) entitled "Must They Have Temperament?":

“I wouldn’t give a hang for an actor without temperament...the amount and quality of temperament distinguishes a good actor from a bad one...During my years as a director, it has my pleasure, my pleasure to work with some of the most temperamental stars of the screen: Alla Nazimova, Norma Talmadge, Percy Marmont, Ernest Torrence, Betty Compson, Richard Dix and many others. I find that the more temperamental an actor is, the easier it is for them to grasp the subtleties of the role (accented) and imbue it with life, instead of merely playing a part.”

Richard Koszarski adds that "Pola Negri, Lon Chaney, Nazimova and Norma Talmadge had some of their finest moments in Brenon’s films, (while carrying on uncontrollably elsewhere) ... his directorial success with the widest range of silent stars remains unparalleled."

Brenon, described once as an "Irish curmudgeon" while on the set, was typical of the old-school “auteur” directors of the early film era, but this behavior became anachronistic when corporate studio executives were ascendant in the 1920s.

In a 1978 interview, Louise Brooks recalls Brenon's able direction in her first film appearance The Street of Forgotten Men (1925). She noted, however, a demonstration of the hostility to the domineering director when a sandbag dropped from the rafters by technicians, nearly hit Brenon. Screenwriter and director Edward Bernds had no fond memories of Brenon. In the 1997 book, The Speed of Sound: Hollywood and the Talkie Revolution 1926–1930, he issued these comments on his colleague:

“So many of the silent film directors were phonies. I didn't think highly of Herbert Brenon, for instance. He was the old, imperious type of director. Lordly, demanding. There was a scene in Lummox (1930), where Winifred Westover was supposed to be betrayed by Ben Lyon, who had gotten her pregnant. He throws some money down and she takes the money and tears it up with her teeth. Well, Brenon demanded real money! And several takes. The poor propman was going around borrowing money from the crew. It was the Imperial syndrome of silent film directors."

== Later years and death ==
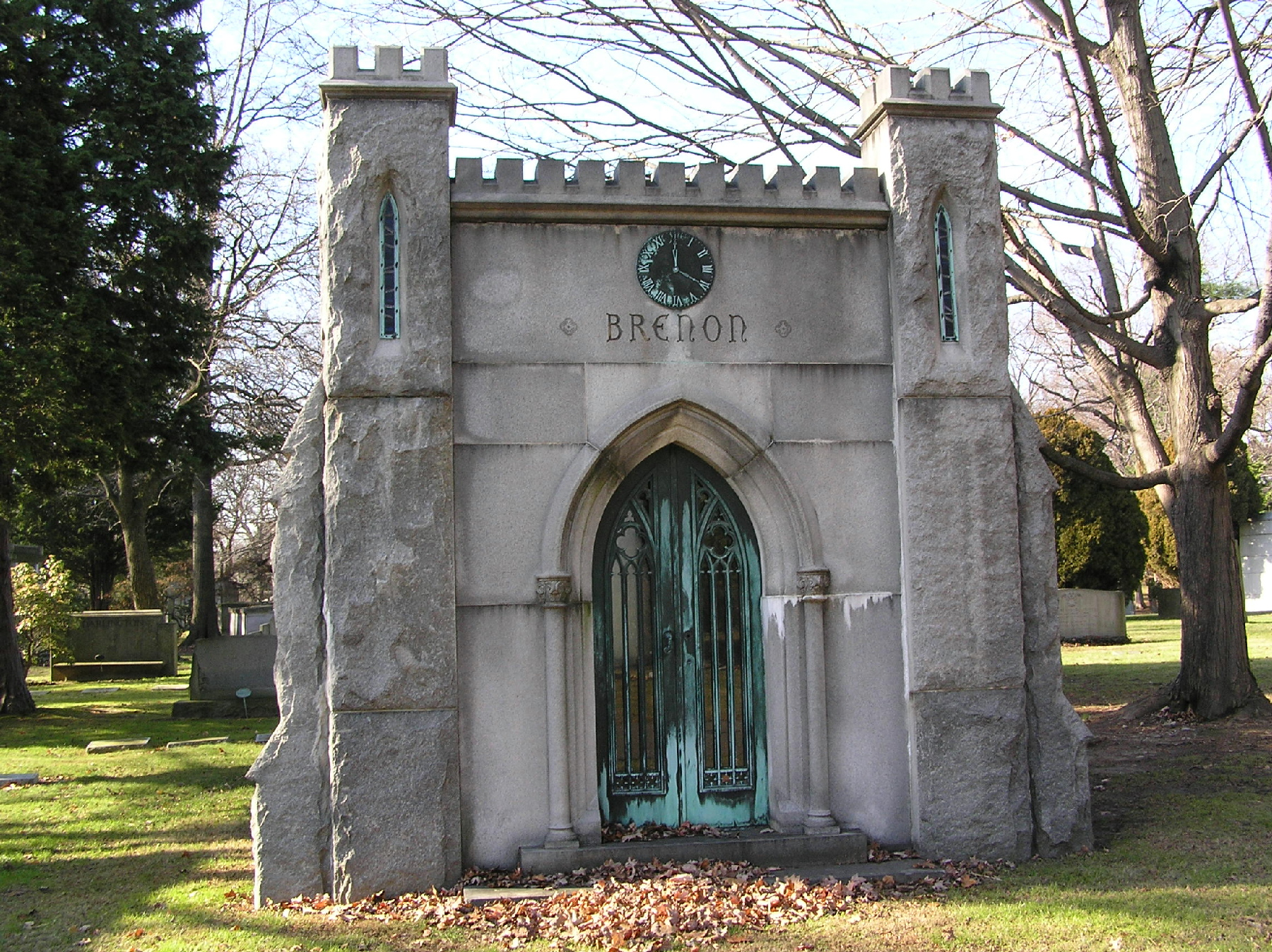
Brenon's mausoleum in Woodlawn Cemetery in New York

Brenon's film career in the United States faded with the transition to sound films. Biographer Charles Higham observed that "the talkie revolution firmly closed an era for many figures ... Herbert Brenon and James Cruze never made another interesting picture."

Brenon's career revived when he moved to England in the mid-1930s and made a number of pictures at various studios. He completed his last film, The Flying Squad in 1940.

Before his death, Brenon was working on his autobiography. When he collaborated with Mary Brian, who played Wendy in Peter Pan, and asked her to paint her idea of what Never-Neverland looked like and the painting was to be included in the photos of the book. He died before it was completed.

Herbert Brenon died in Los Angeles on 21 June 1958, aged 78. He was interred in a private mausoleum at Woodlawn Cemetery in the Bronx, New York.

== Partial filmography ==
- All of Her (1912)
- Dr. Jekyll and Mr. Hyde (1913)
- Ivanhoe (1913)
- Kathleen Mavourneen (1913)
- Absinthe (1914)
- Neptune's Daughter (1914)
- The Kreutzer Sonata (1915)
- The Heart of Maryland (1915)
- The Clemenceau Case (1915)
- The Two Orphans (1915)
- Sin (1915)
- The Soul of Broadway (1915)
- A Daughter of the Gods (1916)
- The Ruling Passion (1916)
- War Brides (1916)
- Whom the Gods Destroy (1916)
- The Fall of the Romanoffs (1917)
- The Lone Wolf (1917)
- Empty Pockets (1918)
- Victory and Peace (1918)
- The Passing of the Third Floor Back (1918)
- 12.10 (1919)
- Beatrice (1919)
- The Mysterious Princess (1920)
- The Passion Flower (1921)
- The Stronger Passion (1921)
- Little Sister (1921)
- The Wonderful Thing (1921)
- Moonshine Valley (1922)
- Shackles of Gold (1922)
- A Stage Romance (1922)
- The Custard Cup (1923)
- The Spanish Dancer (1923)
- The Breaking Point (1924)
- Shadows of Paris (1924)
- The Alaskan (1924)
- Peter Pan (1924)
- The Side Show of Life (1924)
- The Street of Forgotten Men (1925)
- The Little French Girl (1925)
- A Kiss for Cinderella (1925)
- The Song and Dance Man (1926)
- God Gave Me Twenty Cents (1926)
- Dancing Mothers (1926)
- The Great Gatsby (1926)
- Beau Geste (1926)
- The Telephone Girl (1927)
- Sorrell and Son (1927)
- Laugh, Clown, Laugh (1928)
- The Rescue (1929)
- The Case of Sergeant Grischa (1930)
- Lummox (1930)
- Transgression (1931)
- Girl of the Rio (1932)
- Wine, Women and Song (1933)
- Honours Easy (1935)
- Royal Cavalcade (1935)
- Someone at the Door (1936)
- Living Dangerously (1936)
- The Live Wire (1937)
- The Dominant Sex (1937)
- Spring Handicap (1937)
- Housemaster (1938)
- Yellow Sands (1938)
- Black Eyes (1939)
- The Flying Squad (1940)
