= Gates and Morange =

Gates and Morange was a New York City based firm of designers and builders established in 1894 by brothers Frank E. Gates (July 12, 1863, Keokuk, Iowa – December 18, 1952, Bronxville, New York) and Richard H. Gates (June 25, 1872, St. Louis, Missouri – September 16, 1964, Newport, Vermont), and the artist Edward A. Morange (March 20, 1865, Cold Spring, New York – May 19, 1955, Torrington, Connecticut). The firm had a prolific career as scenic designers for Broadway from the 1890s through the 1930s; creating sets for more than 50 productions. The firm also created designs for trade shows, exhibitions, and businesses. While the organization's work as set designers ended after the mid-1930s, the firm continued to operate in other capacities until it closed in 1953.

Gates and Morange first drew widespread acclaim in 1895 for their designs for two works: the road musical Off the Earth and the Broadway play Kismet by playwright Richard F. Carroll. Some of their more celebrated designs included the orchard scene in C.M.S. McLellan's drama Leah Kleschna (1904, Manhattan Theatre) and the London Bridge set for the 1912 revival of J. Comyns Carr's play Oliver Twist; adapted from the Dickens novel.

== Partial list of Broadway works ==
- The White Heather, play (1898)
- Children of the Ghetto, play (1899)
- Sag Harbor, play, premiered at the Theatre Republic on September 27, 1900
- When Knighthood Was in Flower, play (1901)
- Nancy Brown, musical (1903)
- Around the Clock, musical (1906)
- The Red Mill, operetta (1906)
- A Stubborn Cinderella, musical, premiered at the Alhambra Theater in Milwaukee, Wisconsin on May 24, 1908; NYC premiere Broadway Theatre, January 25, 1909
- The Garden of Allah, play (1911)
- When Dreams Come True, musical (1913)
- See America First, comic opera (1916)
- The Bunch and Judy, musical, premiered at the Globe Theater, November 28, 1922
- Wildflower, musical (1923)
- Mary Jane McKane, musical, premiered at the Imperial Theatre, December 25, 1923
- Kid Boots, musical (1923)
- Ziegfeld Follies of 1924, musical revue
- Rainbow, musical (1928)
- Sweet Adeline, musical (1929)

== Bibliography ==
- Bordman, Gerald; Hischak, Thomas S. (2004). "Gates and Morange". The Oxford Companion to American Theatre. Oxford University Press. pp. 253–254. ISBN 9780199771158.
- Dan Dietz (15 July 2022). "A Stubborn Cinderella". The Complete Book of 1900s Broadway Musicals. Rowman & Littlefield Publishers. pp. 533–534. ISBN 9781538168943.
- Mantle, Burns; Sherwood, Garrison P.; Chapman, John Arthur (1944). The Best Plays of 1899-1909. Dodd, Mead & Co.
- Owen, Bobbi (1991). "Gates and Morange". Scenic Design on Broadway: Designers and Their Credits, 1915-1990. Bloomsbury Academic. pp. 70–71. ISBN 9780313265341.
