= Ludwig Fulda =

German playwright and poet

Ludwig Anton Salomon Fulda
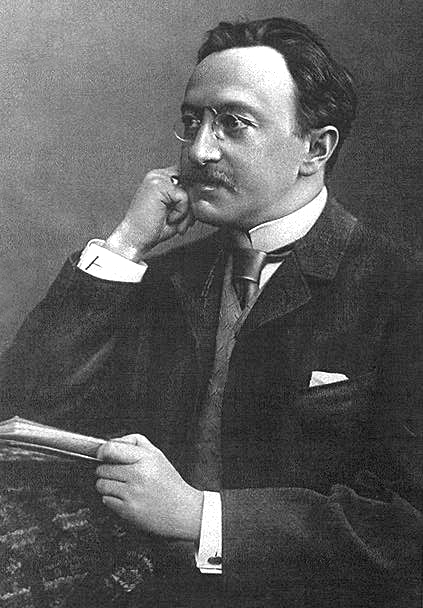
- Born: July 7, 1862; Free City of Frankfurt
- Died: March 7, 1939 (aged 76); Berlin, Germany

Ludwig Anton Salomon Fulda (July 7, 1862 – March 7, 1939) was a German playwright and poet, with a strong social commitment. He lived with Moritz Moszkowski's first wife Henriette, née Chaminade, younger sister of pianist and composer Cécile Chaminade.

== Biography ==
He was born in the Free City of Frankfurt. He was a member of the Prussian Academy of Arts and the first president of the PEN of Germany (1925–1932). He visited the United States in 1906 on the invitation of the Germanistic Society.

A Jew, he was removed from his work by the Nazis in 1933. Fulda committed suicide in Berlin in 1939 when he was denied entry into the United States.

== Works ==
Fulda's creations used the relationships of his characters to develop the social and political issues of his time. Fulda's works include Das verlorene Paradies (1892; translated as The Lost Paradise, 1897), Der Talisman (1892), Jugendfreunde (1897) and Maskerade (1904). His novel Der Seeräuber was later freely adapted into the play The Pirate by S. N. Behrman. Fulda's 1901 play, Die Zwillingsschwester was adapted into the screenplay by Behrman and Salka Viertel of the American motion picture Two-Faced Woman (1941) starring Greta Garbo. Inspired by the story of Aladdin, he wrote Aladdin und die Wunderlampe. He also made numerous translations.

Jugendfreunde was adapted in the United States into the 1912 play Our Wives by Helen Craft/Kraft and Frank Mandel. That play was adapted into the musical comedy The Only Girl by Victor Herbert.
