= Anna Christie (1930 English-language film) =

1930 film

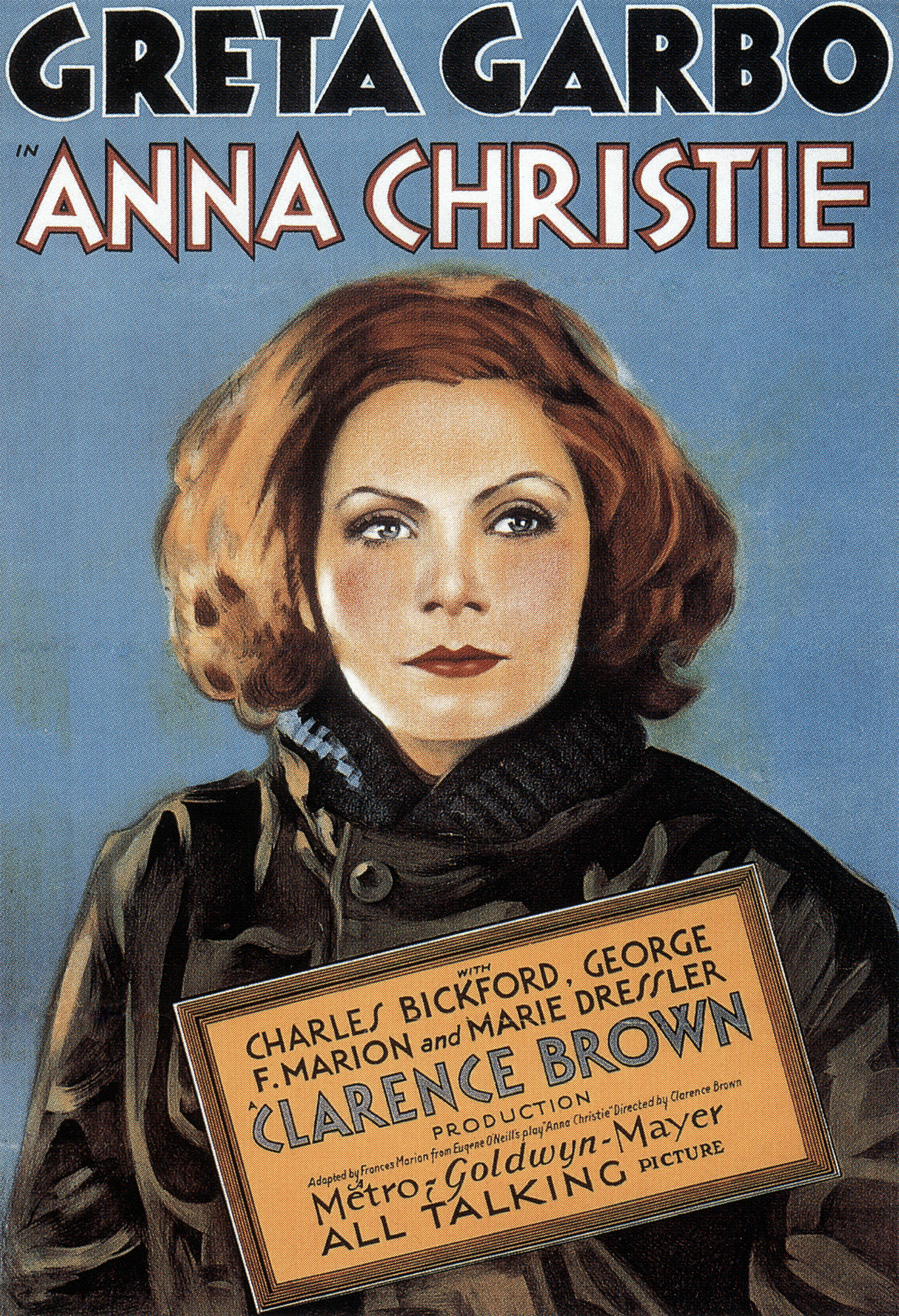
- Theatrical release poster
- Directed by: Clarence Brown
- Screenplay by: Frances Marion
- Based on: Anna Christie; 1921 play by Eugene O'Neill
- Produced by: Clarence Brown; Paul Bern; Irving Thalberg
- Starring: Greta Garbo; Charles Bickford; George F. Marion; Marie Dressler
- Cinematography: William H. Daniels
- Edited by: Hugh Wynn
- Distributed by: Metro-Goldwyn-Mayer
- Release date: February 21, 1930
- Running time: 89 minutes
- Country: United States
- Language: English
- Budget: $376,000
- Box office: $1,499,000

Anna Christie is a 1930 American pre-Code romantic drama film adaptation of the 1921 play of the same name by Eugene O'Neill. It was adapted by Frances Marion, produced and directed by Clarence Brown with Paul Bern and Irving Thalberg as co-producers. The cinematography was by William H. Daniels, the art direction by Cedric Gibbons and the costume design by Adrian.

The film stars Greta Garbo, Charles Bickford, George F. Marion, and Marie Dressler. It was marketed using the slogan "Garbo Talks!", as it was her first talkie film. Of all its stars, Garbo was the one that MGM kept out of talking films the longest for fear that one of their bigger stars, like so many others, would not succeed in them. Her famous first line is: "Gimme a whisky, ginger ale on the side, and don't be stingy, baby!"

In fact, Garbo's English was so good by the time she appeared in this film, she had to add an accent in several retakes to sound more like the Swedish Anna. In addition to the English and German-language version of this film, a silent version with titles was also made. George F. Marion performed the role of Anna's father in the original Broadway production and in both the 1923 and 1930 film adaptations.

It was nominated for Academy Awards for Best Director, Best Actress (Greta Garbo) and Best Cinematography.

Due to being a film published in 1930, it entered the public domain on January 1, 2026.

== Plot ==
Anna Christie (1930)

Chris Christofferson, the alcoholic skipper of a coal barge in New York, receives a letter from his estranged twenty-year-old daughter Anna "Christie" Christofferson, telling him that she will be leaving Minnesota to stay with him. Chris left Anna to be raised by relatives on a St. Paul farm 15 years before, and has not seen her since.

Anna arrives an emotionally wounded woman with a dishonorable, hidden past: she has worked in a brothel for two years. One night, Chris rescues Matt and two other displaced sailors from the sea. Anna and Matt soon fall in love and Anna has the best days of her life. But when Matt proposes to her, she is reluctant and haunted by her recent past. Matt insists and compels Anna to tell him the truth. She opens her heart to Matt and her father, disclosing her dark secrets.

== Cast ==
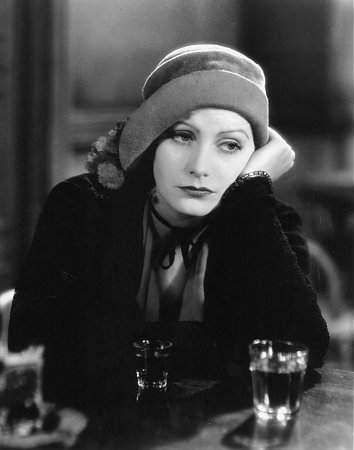
Greta Garbo in her talking film debut

- Greta Garbo as Anna Christie
- Charles Bickford as Matt Burke
- George F. Marion as Chris Christofferson
- Marie Dressler as Marthy Owens
- James T. Mack as Johnny, the Harp
- Lee Phelps as Larry

== Academy Award nominations ==
Anna Christie was one of highest-grossing films of 1930 and received the following Academy Award nominations:

- Best Actress – Greta Garbo
- Best Director – Clarence Brown
- Best Cinematography – William H. Daniels

== German-language version ==
In the early years of sound films, Hollywood studios produced foreign-language versions of some of their films using the same sets and sometimes the same costumes. Native speakers of the language usually replaced some or all of the original cast. While many of those versions no longer exist, the German-language version of Anna Christie survives. Directed by Jacques Feyder and filmed at MGM in July and August 1930 (the English-language version had been filmed in October and November 1929), it also stars Garbo as Anna, but with Theo Shall, Hans Junkermann, and Salka Viertel playing Matt, Chris, and Marthy. Garbo's famous first line became "Whisky – aber nicht zu knapp!" ("Whiskey, but not too short"). The English and German-language versions grossed a combined total of $1,499,000. Both versions are available on a double-sided DVD released in the US in 2005, but the German version is sourced from an inferior subtitled print; a much better print without subtitles exists.

== Reception ==
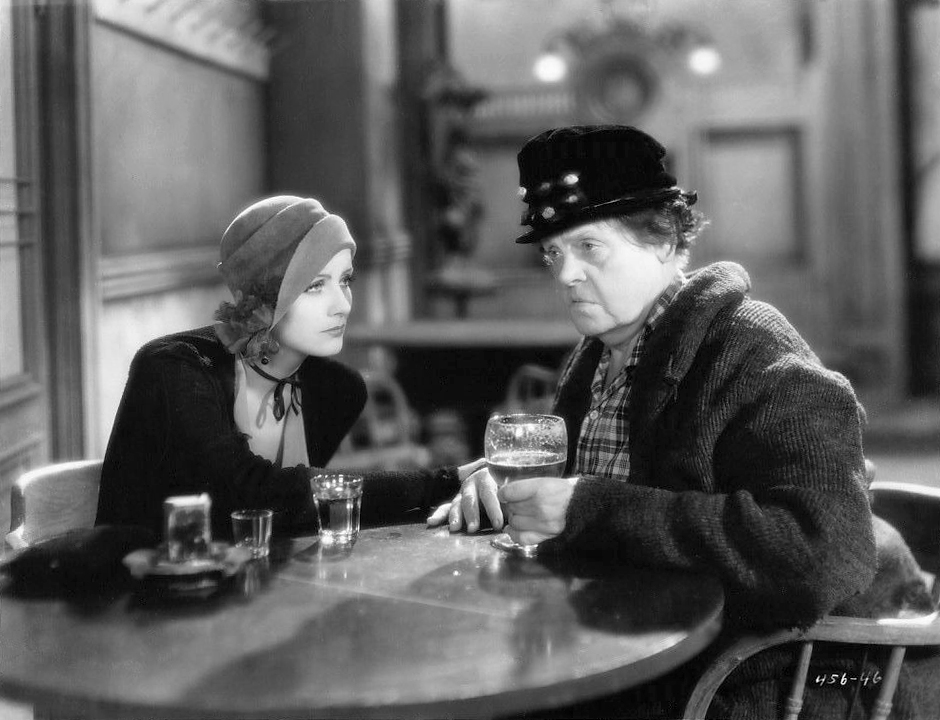
Garbo and Marie Dressler in Anna Christie

The film grossed $1,499,000, it made $1,013,000 in the United States and Canada and $486,000 elsewhere, with a profit of $576,000.

Reviews from critics were also positive. Mordaunt Hall of The New York Times remarked that Garbo was "even more interesting through being heard than she was in her mute portrayals. She reveals no nervousness before the microphone and her careful interpretation of Anna can scarcely be disputed." Variety reported that it was "in all departments a wow picture" and "another marker along the line of cinematic progress." Film Daily called it "a wow for sophisticated audiences" and wrote that Garbo's performance was "superb". Although John Mosher of The New Yorker thought it "implausible that a woman so markedly beautiful should have such an extraordinarily difficult time", he called Garbo's performance "effective" and wrote that Bickford and Marion were "both excellent", concluding that it was "a picture of his play that Eugene O'Neill, I should think, would approve."

Contemporaneous reviews also expressed surprise at the low pitch of Garbo's voice. Hall wrote that "although the low-toned voice is not what is expected from the alluring actress, one becomes accustomed to it, for it is a voice undeniably suited to the unfortunate Anna." Variety said that "La Garbo's accent is nicely edged with a Norse "yah", but once the ear gets the pitch it's okay and the spectator is under the spell of her performance." Mosher called it "a boy's voice, really, rather flat, rather toneless, yet growing more attractive as the picture advances and you become somewhat accustomed to it."

In 1962, film historian Richard Schickel reviewed the film negatively, describing it as "dull", with Marie Dressler providing "the only vitality in an otherwise static and ludicrous" film.

Garbo's opening line was nominated for AFI's 100 Years...100 Movie Quotes.

== Home media ==
Though the English-language version of Anna Christie has been released numerous times worldwide on DVD, the German version is only available on a subtitled US DVD.

== See also ==
- Anna Christie (1923 film)
