= 1935 New York Film Critics Circle Awards =

American film award ceremony

1st New York Film Critics Circle Awards
- Announced on: January 2, 1936
- Presented on: March 1, 1936
- Site: Ritz-Carlton Hotel, Manhattan, New York City

Highlights
- Best Picture: The Informer

The first New York Film Critics Circle Awards honored the best filmmaking of 1935. They were announced on January 2, 1936.

The awards were presented on March 1, 1936, in a short televised ceremony at the Ritz-Carlton Hotel.

== Winners ==
=== Best Picture ===
- The Informer

=== Best Director ===
- John Ford – The Informer
- Runner-up – Alfred Hitchcock – The Man Who Knew Too Much and The 39 Steps

=== Best Actor ===
- Charles Laughton – Mutiny on the Bounty and Ruggles of Red Gap
- Runner-up: Victor McLaglen – The Informer

=== Best Actress ===
- Greta Garbo – Anna Karenina
- Runner-up: Katharine Hepburn – Alice Adams
