= Anna Christie (1930 German-language film) =

1930 film

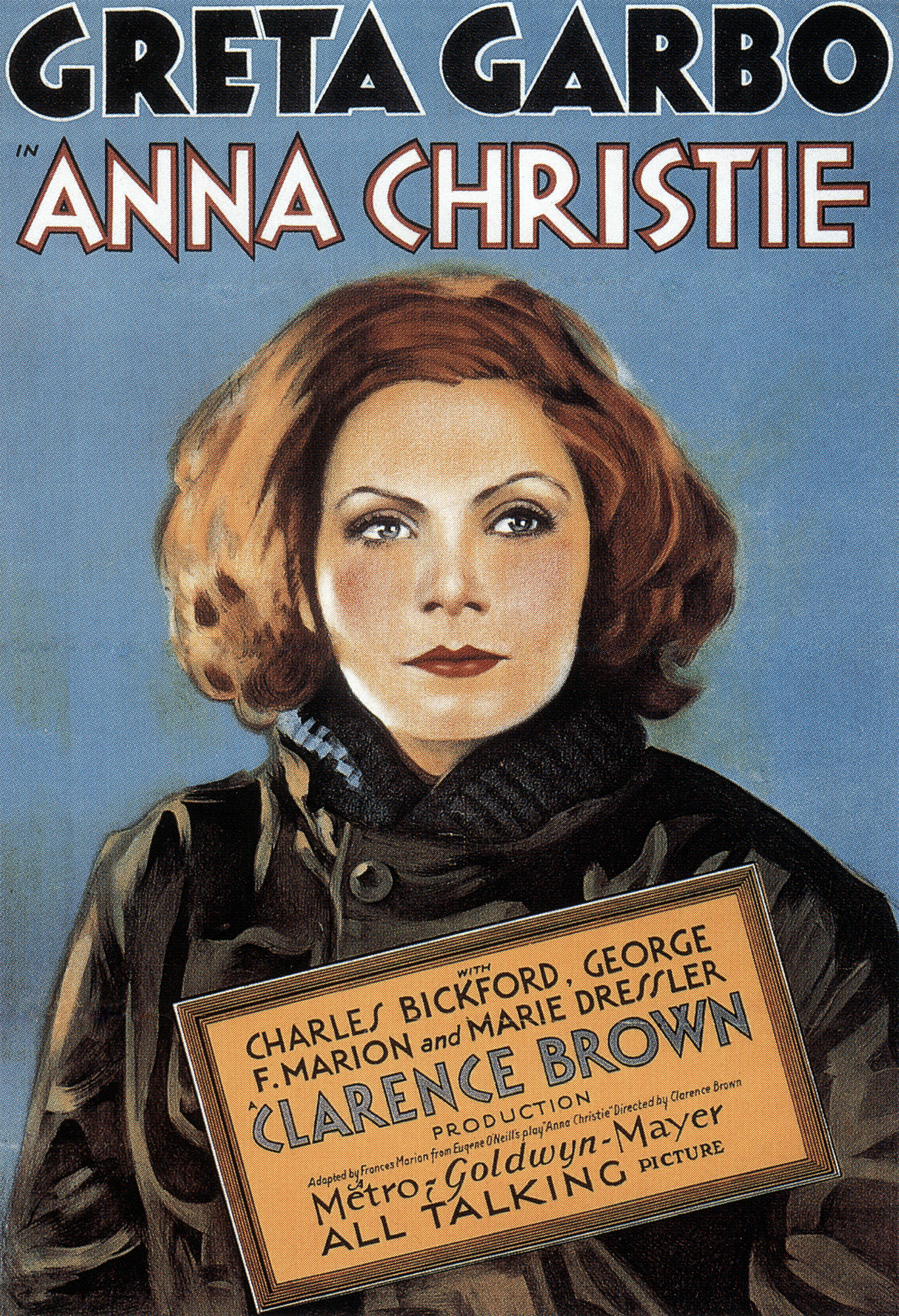
- (Poster for original English-language version)
- Directed by: Jacques Feyder
- Written by: Walter Hasenclever; Frances Marion
- Screenplay by: Frank Reicher
- Based on: Anna Christie; 1921 play by Eugene O'Neill
- Starring: Greta Garbo; Theo Shall; Hans Junkermann; Salka Viertel
- Cinematography: William H. Daniels
- Edited by: Finn Ulback
- Distributed by: Metro-Goldwyn-Mayer
- Release date: December 2, 1930
- Running time: 85 minutes
- Country: United States
- Language: German

Anna Christie is a 1930 German-language film adapted from the 1921 Eugene O'Neill play of the same title. It was filmed following the release of the English-language version of the same adaptation earlier in 1930. Both versions feature leading actress Greta Garbo. In the early years of sound films, Hollywood studios produced foreign-language versions of some of their films using the same sets and sometimes the same costumes, with native speakers of the language usually replacing some or all of the original cast. The German-language version of Anna Christie is one of the few that survives.

The film was produced by Metro-Goldwyn-Mayer at their Culver City, California studio in July and August 1930 (the English-language original had been filmed there in October and November 1929). It premiered in Cologne, Germany on December 2, 1930. Garbo is the only cast member appearing in both versions and looks noticeably different in the two. The German dialog was written by Walter Hasenclever and Frank Reicher, for the most part very closely following Frances Marion's original adaptation. The film was directed by Jacques Feyder using the same cinematographer, Garbo favorite William H. Daniels, but a different crew.

== Plot ==
Anna Christie (1930)

Chris Christofferson, the alcoholic skipper of a coal barge in New York, receives a letter from his estranged twenty-year-old daughter Anna "Christie" Christofferson. She tells him that she'll be leaving Minnesota to stay with him. Chris had left Anna 15 years ago to be raised by relatives who live on a farm in the countryside of St. Paul and has not seen her since.

Anna Christie arrives, an emotionally wounded woman with a dishonorable, hidden past, having worked as a prostitute for two years, after fleeing the farm where she had been greatly overworked and then raped. She moves to the barge to live with her father, who, one night, rescues Matt from the sea. Anna and Matt fall in love and she has the best days of her life. However, when Matt proposes marriage, she is reluctant, haunted by her past. Matt insists and compels Anna to tell him the truth.

== Cast (in credits order) ==
- Greta Garbo as Anna Christie
- Theo Shall as Matt Burke
- Hans Junkermann as Chris Christofferson
- Salka Viertel as Marthy Owens
- Herman Bing as Larry (uncredited)

== Home media ==
Though the English-language version of Anna Christie has been released numerous times worldwide on DVD, the German version is only available on a subtitled US DVD. The latter was sourced from an inferior print; a much better print without subtitles exists.
