= Anna Karenina (1935 film) =

1935 film by Clarence Brown

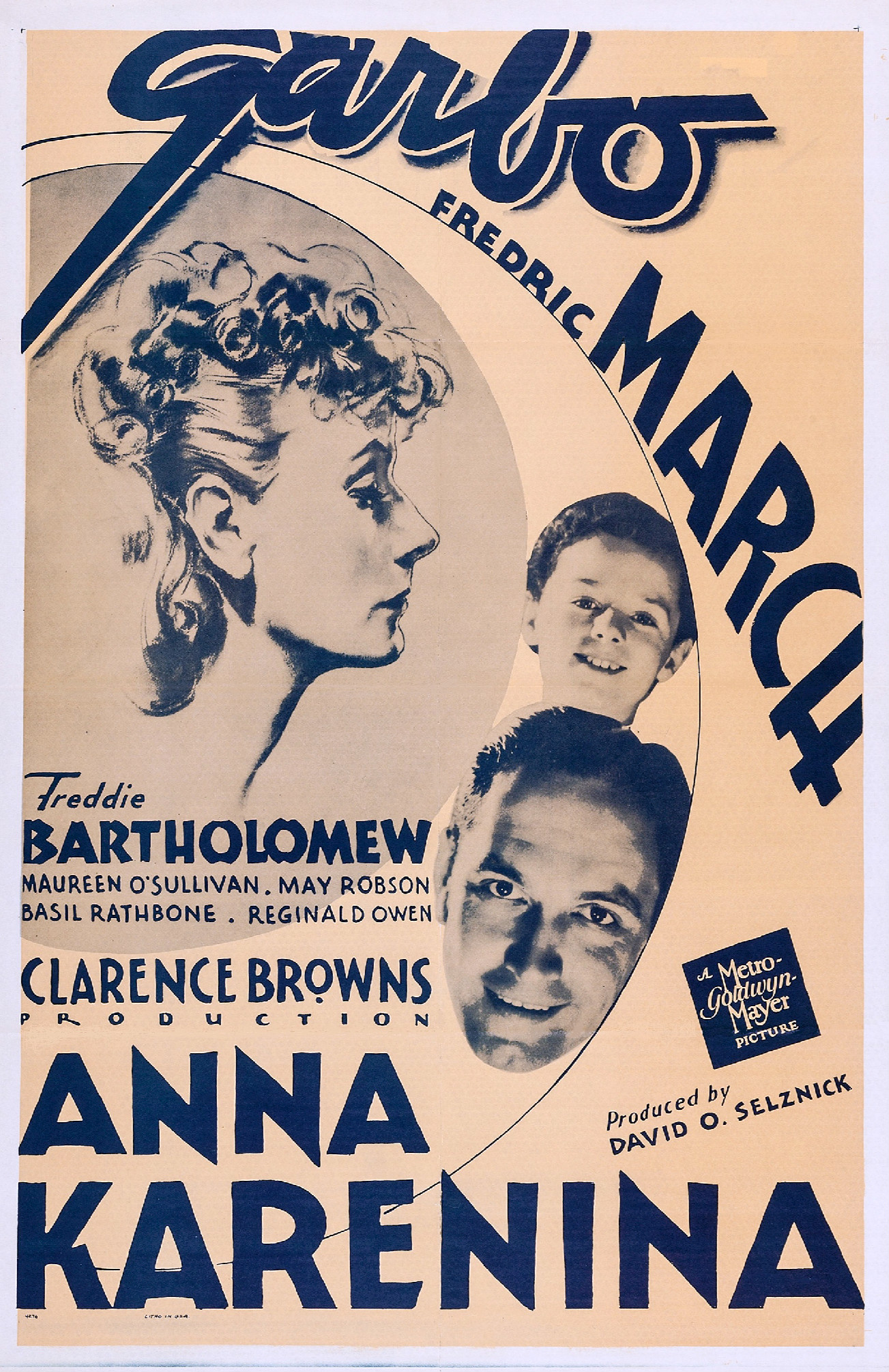
- 1935 release poster
- Directed by: Clarence Brown
- Screenplay by: S.N. Behrman; Clemence Dane; Salka Viertel
- Based on: Anna Karenina; 1878 novel by Leo Tolstoy
- Produced by: David O. Selznick
- Starring: Greta Garbo; Fredric March; Freddie Bartholomew
- Cinematography: William H. Daniels
- Edited by: Robert Kern
- Music by: Herbert Stothart
- Distributed by: Metro-Goldwyn-Mayer
- Release date: August 30, 1935 (New York City)
- Running time: 95 minutes
- Country: United States
- Language: English
- Budget: $1,152,000
- Box office: $2,304,000

Anna Karenina is a 1935 Metro-Goldwyn-Mayer film adaptation of the 1878 novel Anna Karenina by Leo Tolstoy and directed by Clarence Brown. The film stars Greta Garbo, Fredric March, Basil Rathbone, and Maureen O'Sullivan. There are several other film adaptations of the novel.

In New York, the film opened at the Capitol Theatre, the site of many prestigious MGM premieres. The film earned $2,304,000 at the box office, and won the Mussolini Cup for best foreign film at the Venice Film Festival. Greta Garbo received a New York Film Critics Circle Award for Best Actress for her role as Anna. In addition, the film was ranked #42 on the American Film Institute's list of AFI's 100 Years...100 Passions.

== Plot ==
Anna Karenina is the wife of the much older Czarist official Karenin. While in Moscow she tries to persuade her brother Stiva from a life of debauchery and adultery. She also meets military officer Count Vronsky. Back home in St Petersburg she begins an affair with him, a liaison which destroys her marriage; she is prohibited from seeing her son Sergei. As she becomes shunned by society her relationship with Vronsky also suffers, with eventual dire results.

== Cast ==
- Greta Garbo as Anna Karenina
- Fredric March as Count Vronsky
- Freddie Bartholomew as Sergei
- Maureen O'Sullivan as Kitty
- May Robson as Countess Vronsky
- Basil Rathbone as Karenin
- Reginald Owen as Stiva
- Phoebe Foster as Dolly
- Reginald Denny as Yashvin
- Gyles Isham as Levin
- Joan Marsh as Lili
- Ethel Griffies as Mme. Kartasov
- Harry Beresford as Matve
- Cora Sue Collins as Tania
- Buster Phelps as Grisha
- Mary Forbes as Princess Sorokina
- Harry Allen as Cord
- Sarah Padden as Governess
- Mischa Auer as Mahotin (uncredited)
- Harry Cording as Officer (uncredited)
- Olaf Hytten as Butler (uncredited)

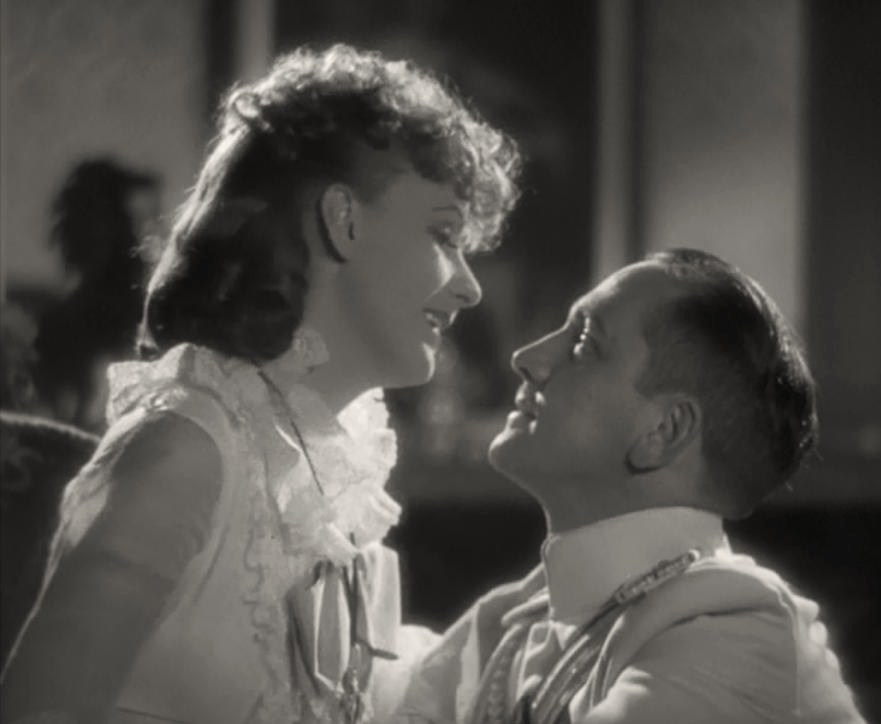
Greta Garbo and Fredric March

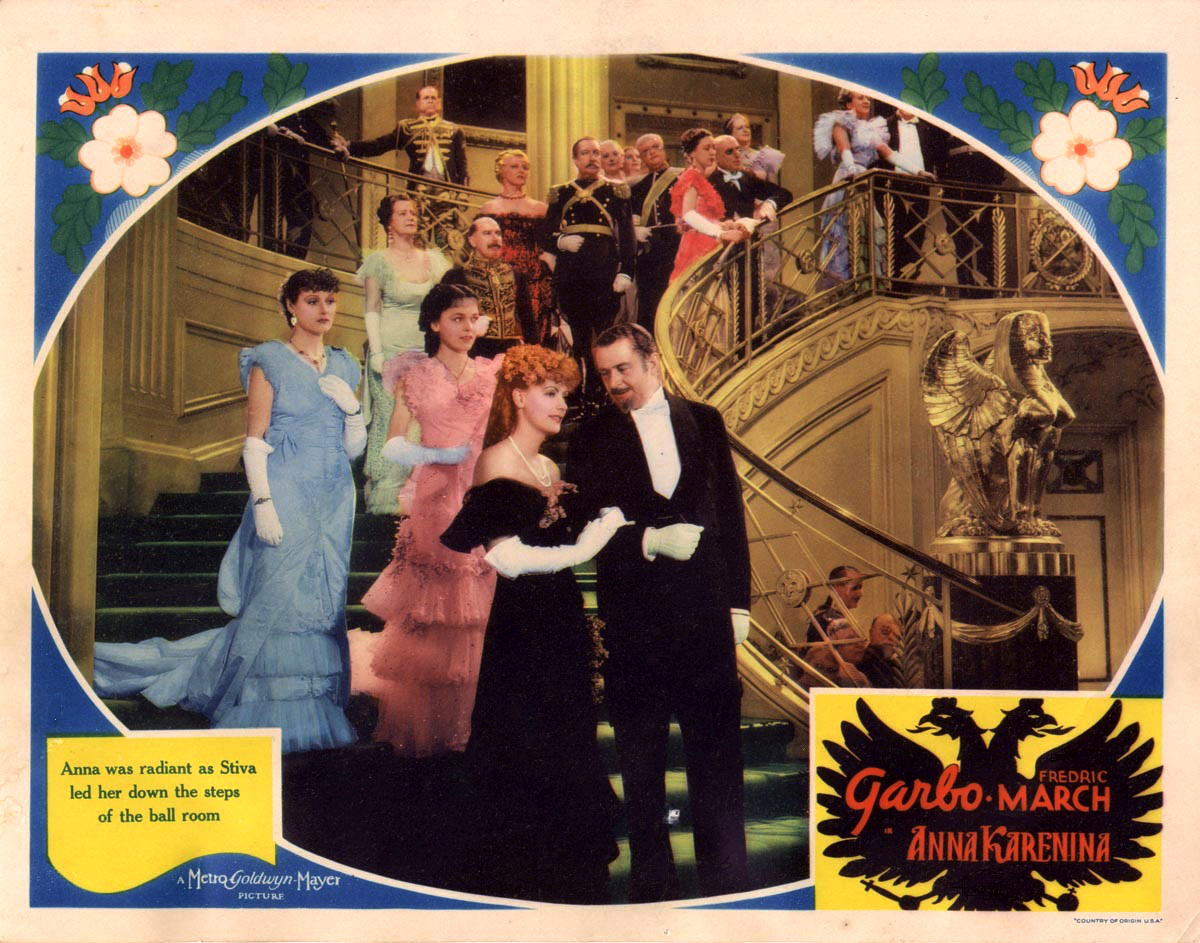
Lobby card for Anna Karenina

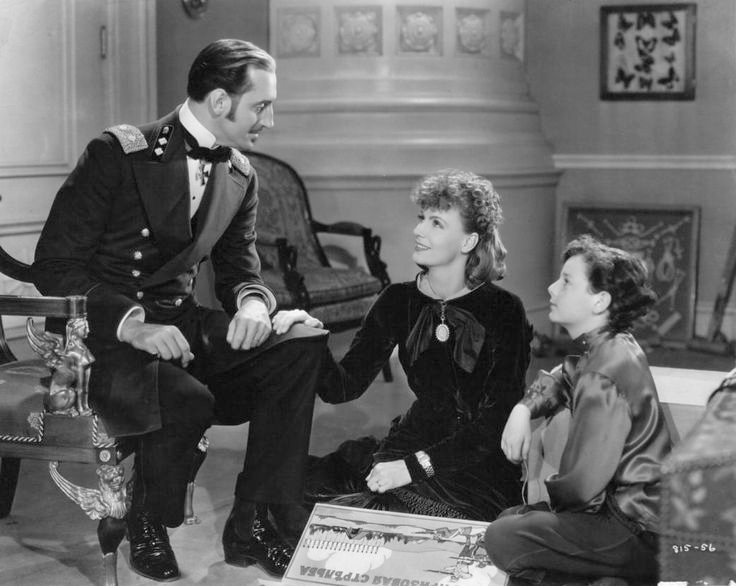
Basil Rathbone, Greta Garbo and Freddie Bartholomew in Anna Karenina

== Reception ==
=== Box office ===
The film grossed $865,000 in the United States and Canada, and grossed $1,439,000 in other markets. It brought MGM a profit of $320,000.

=== Critical response ===
Writing for The Spectator in 1935, Graham Greene made much of Greta Garbo's powerful and theatrical acting in the film, noting that "it is Greta Garbo's personality which 'makes' this film, which fills the mould of the neat respectful adaptation with some kind of sense of the greatness of the novel". Greene found that the pathos that Garbo's acting brings to the picture overwhelms the acting of all supporting cast save that of Basil Rathbone.

Helen Brown Norden, in a glowing review in Vanity Fair, wrote "Against the glittering background, these people move to their inevitable doom. There seems more of anguish and more of sombre depth in this version than there was in the old silent film (with Garbo and John Gilbert). Garbo—still with that remote look of 'the implacable Aphrodite' on her face—acts with a dignity and a bitter passion which reach a mature climax in the final scene."

The film has received acclaim from modern critics. It holds a 93% approval rating on Rotten Tomatoes, based on 14 reviews, and an average rating of 7.1/10.

The film is recognized by American Film Institute in these lists:

- 2002: AFI's 100 Years...100 Passions – #42

== Notes ==
Garbo also was the lead in the 1927 version of Anna Karenina, released under the title Love.
