= Two-Faced Woman =

1941 film by George Cukor, Andrew Marton

- Original film poster
- Directed by: George Cukor
- Written by: S.N. Behrman; Salka Viertel; George Oppenheimer
- Produced by: Gottfried Reinhardt
- Starring: Greta Garbo; Melvyn Douglas; Constance Bennett; Roland Young; Ruth Gordon
- Cinematography: Joseph Ruttenberg
- Edited by: George Boemler
- Music by: Bronislau Kaper
- Production company: Metro-Goldwyn-Mayer
- Distributed by: Loew's, Inc.
- Release date: November 30, 1941
- Running time: 90 minutes
- Country: United States
- Language: English
- Budget: $1,247,000
- Box office: $1,800,000

Two-Faced Woman is a 1941 American romantic comedy film directed by George Cukor and starring Greta Garbo in her final film role, Melvyn Douglas, Constance Bennett, and Roland Young. The movie was distributed by Metro-Goldwyn-Mayer.

Garbo plays a wife who pretends to be her own fictitious twin sister in order to recapture the affections of her estranged husband (Douglas), who has left her for a former girlfriend (Bennett). The film is generally regarded as the box-office flop that ended Garbo's career in an unsuccessful attempt to modernize or "Americanize" her image in order to increase her shrinking fan base in the United States. By mutual agreement, Garbo's contract with MGM was terminated shortly after Two-Faced Woman was released, and it became her last film.

== Plot ==
Following a whirlwind romance and marriage, Ski instructor Karin Borg (Greta Garbo) learns, to her chagrin, that her new husband Larry Blake (Melvyn Douglas), editor of a fashion magazine, expects her to be a dutiful, submissive wife and not the independent woman she was when they met. They separate and Larry returns to New York City, where he takes up again with playwright Griselda Vaughn (Constance Bennett), with whom he was involved before his marriage.

Karin travels to New York to thwart the romance and win her husband back by masquerading as her spurious twin sister Katherine Borg, a wild, amoral "modern" woman. Larry is fascinated by Karin, in the guise of Katherine, but he quickly discovers the truth. He continues to play along, nearly seducing his wife's purported twin sister, but stopping short each time. Karin and Larry eventually reunite during a chase on the ski slopes, and all is forgiven.

== Cast ==
- Greta Garbo as Karin Borg Blake / Katherine Borg
- Melvyn Douglas as Larry Blake
- Constance Bennett as Griselda Vaughn
- Roland Young as O.O. Miller
- Ruth Gordon as Ruth Ellis
- Robert Sterling as Dick Williams
- Frances Carson as Miss Dunbar

== Production ==
Before Garbo's previous film, Ninotchka (1939) was completed, MGM had scheduled Madame Curie as her next picture. Pleased with the financial and critical success of Ninotchka, MGM decided to pair Garbo and Melvyn Douglas, her Ninotchka co-star, in another romantic comedy. George Cukor, who had directed Garbo in Camille (1936), which is generally regarded as her best film, was assigned to direct. Constance Bennett, a major leading lady of the 1930s whose career was waning, was cast in a supporting role through the efforts of her friend Cukor. The screenplay by S.N. Behrman, Salka Viertel, and George Oppenheimer was based on a 1925 Constance Talmadge silent film titled Her Sister from Paris, which in turn was based on a play by German playwright Ludwig Fulda.

MGM used the film to promote a new image of Garbo as modern and glamorous, hoping to increase her appeal to filmgoers in the United States. Much of the income from Garbo's earlier pictures had come from their popularity in the European market, which was now unavailable due to World War II. Garbo hated the script for Two-Faced Woman and did not want to make the film; she was disappointed that Madame Curie had been shelved (MGM made the film with Greer Garson in 1943) and was very uncomfortable with the attempt to portray her as a modern "American" woman. Garbo strongly objected to a scene where she is wearing a bathing suit and swimming; she pleaded with director Cukor to have the scene cut, but Cukor, who shared Garbo's reservations about the film, told her it had to remain in the picture. The script also called for Garbo to dance in an elaborate ballroom rhumba scene. Garbo, who disliked dancing in general, was forced to take lessons and once hid from her dance instructor in a tree at her home. She later said that she was embarrassed by the film and that it "was not good and it could never be made good." Garbo recalled that Melvyn Douglas, her co-star, disliked the film as well and his distaste for it was obvious during the production.

Two-Faced Woman was produced by Gottfried Reinhardt, with music by Bronislau Kaper, cinematography by Joseph Ruttenberg, art direction by Cedric Gibbons, and costume design by Adrian.

== Censorship controversy and changes to original version ==
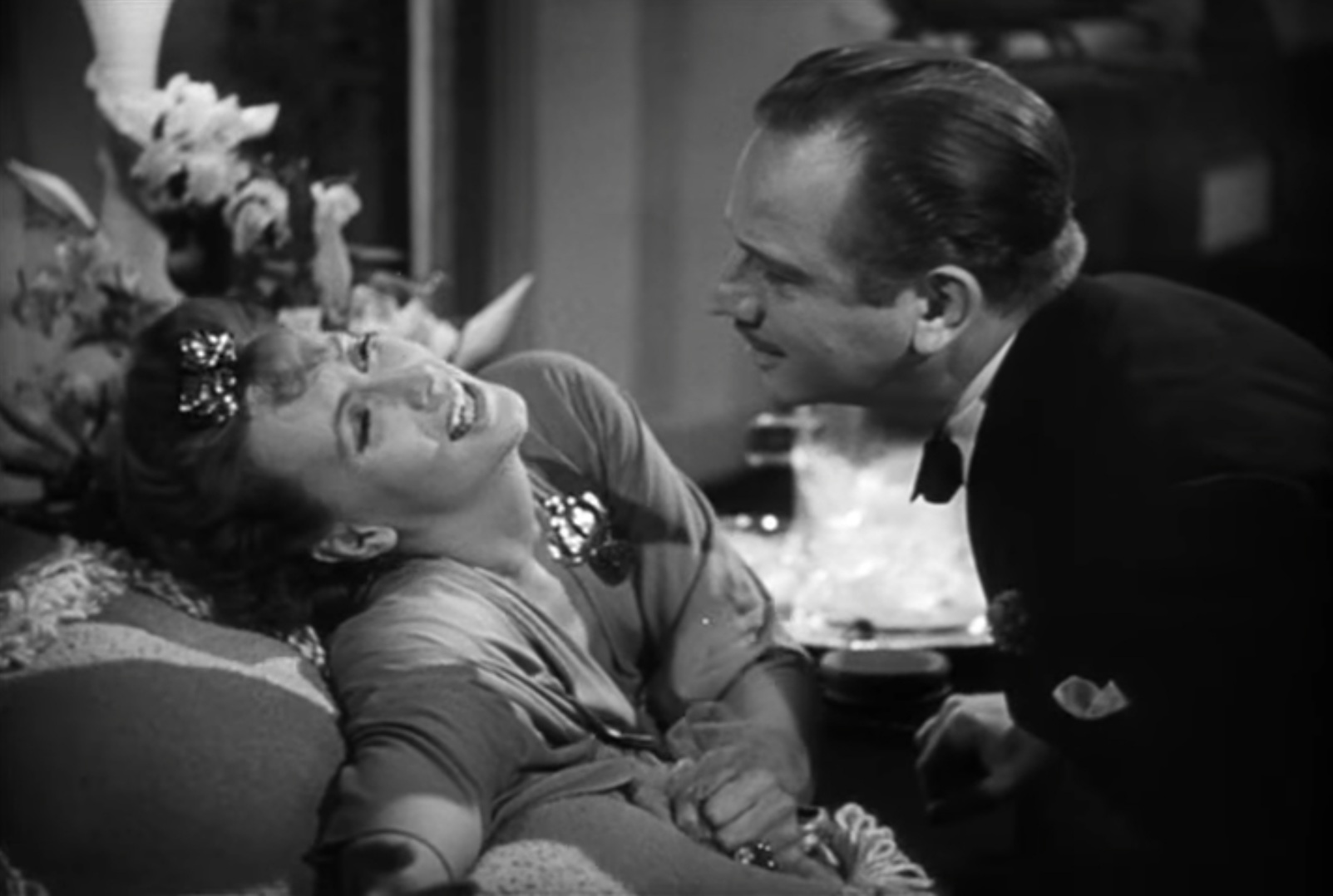
Garbo and Douglas in Two-Faced Woman (1941)

MGM originally scheduled Two-Faced Woman for release in November 1941. The film received a Production Code seal of approval, but the National Legion of Decency rated the film as "C" for condemned — unusual at that time for a major Hollywood release — citing its alleged "immoral and un-Christian attitude toward marriage and its obligations: impudently suggestive scenes, dialogue, and situations: suggestive costumes." The film also was condemned by the archbishop of New York, the first time a particular film had been singled out. These condemnations strongly discouraged Catholics from seeing the film. Two-Faced Woman was banned in several cities, including Boston and Providence, Rhode Island. Other cities including Omaha, Chicago, and Milwaukee ordered that some scenes be cut.

MGM responded to the negative criticism of Two-Faced Woman by withdrawing the original cut of the film. Some scenes were edited and reshot before the second release date. George Cukor refused to participate in the retakes. Most notably, a new scene was filmed and inserted in which Larry Blake determines almost immediately that Katherine is actually his estranged wife Karin, posing as her spurious twin sister and chooses to play along with her pretense rather than actually consider having an affair with his sister-in-law. The Legion of Decency amended its rating for the modified film from a "C", meaning condemned, to "B", meaning morally objectionable in part.

In addition to censorship-related changes, the studio also cut a number of Constance Bennett's scenes and changed the ending because some felt that Bennett had upstaged Garbo in many of their scenes together. Even with the cuts, Leonard Maltin wrote in 2014 that Bennett "steal[s] the film with her hilarious performance."

The revised version of Two-Faced Woman was released in early January 1942. The original, uncensored version of the film still exists, and was shown in 2004 at a George Cukor retrospective at the National Film Theatre in London, but has not been issued commercially in either the United States or Europe but has been shown on Turner Classic Movies (owned by WarnerMedia which holds the rights to the pre-1986 MGM film library).

== Reception ==
Upon the amended film's release in January 1942, Garbo received some of the worst reviews of her career. Despite the negative notices, Garbo was awarded The National Board of Review of Motion Pictures Best Acting Award. John Mosher of The New Yorker wrote of Garbo that "one can feel only that the archbishop who opposed the showing of the film was her one true friend. Of Garbo's folly there is little really to say. Just condolences might be enough." Theodore Strauss of The New York Times wrote: "It is hardly necessary to sit in judgment upon such delicate matters of public interest, inasmuch as the film decisively condemns itself by shoddy workmanship. Miss Garbo's current attempt to trip the light fantastic is one of the awkward exhibitions of the season, George Cukor's direction is static and labored, and the script is a stale joke, repeated at length. Considering the several talents that have combined to create this dismal jape, put down Two-Faced Woman as one of the more costly disappointments of the year." The review apparently missed the point that Garbo's role is to impersonate her fictional twin sister who unlike her is a novice to dancing. A scathing review in Time proclaimed the film was "almost as shocking as seeing your mother drunk."

Even those reviews that praised Garbo's performance, still panned the film in general. Variety wrote: "That the experiment of converting Miss Garbo into a comedienne is not entirely successful is no fault of hers. Had the script writers and the director, George Cukor, entered into the same spirit of the thing with as much enthusiasm, lack of self-consciousness and abandon as the star, the result would have been a smash hit...Just how some of the lines of dialog escaped the scissors is as much of a mystery as how the screen writers...so completely flopped in providing a reasonably satisfactory finale." Harrison's Reports called Garbo's performance "brilliant...yet if it were not for her charms and fine acting ability there would be little to recommend, for the story is weak and somewhat silly." Film Daily declared Garbo "a delightful comedienne" but called it "unfortunate that the combined talents" of the scriptwriters "do not measure up to those of Miss Garbo's. George Cukor's direction is not as keen as it could be and tends to let the film ramble."

Due to the film's critical failure, many sources have said that the film also did poorly at the box office. According to MGM records, it earned $875,000 in the United States and Canada, and $925,000 in other markets, resulting in an initial loss of $62,000. Despite the previous success of Ninotchka, audiences had difficulty accepting Garbo as a comedienne. Attendance also was likely impacted by the Japanese attack on Pearl Harbor, which occurred three weeks before the film was re-released. A few sources have challenged the general perception that the picture was a financial failure, with at least one stating that it eventually made back five times its budget.

Later in 1942, Garbo and MGM mutually agreed to terminate her contract with the studio. Contrary to popular belief, Garbo did not retire from acting because of the poor reception to Two-Faced Woman; she fully intended to return to films following the end of World War II. Since she was no longer under a studio contract, she was able to be highly selective over any roles offered to her; for various reasons, several later film projects which interested her did not come to fruition, leaving Two-Faced Woman as her final film.
