= Greta Garbo =

Swedish and American actress (1905–1990)

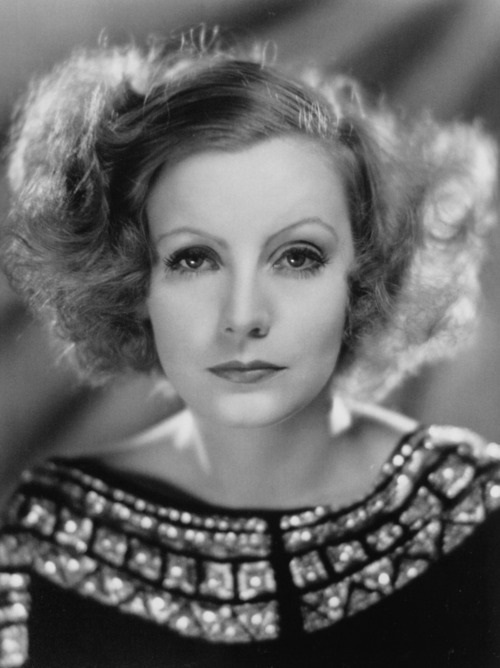
- Garbo in publicity photo for Inspiration (1931)
- Born: Greta Lovisa Gustafsson; 18 September 1905; Södermalm, Stockholm, Sweden
- Died: 15 April 1990 (aged 84); New York City, U.S.
- Resting place: Skogskyrkogården, Stockholm
- Citizenship: Sweden (until 1951); U.S. (from 1951)
- Education: Royal Dramatic Training Academy, Stockholm
- Occupation: Actress
- Years active: 1920–1941

Greta Garbo (Note: Swedish pronunciation: [ˈɡrêːta ˈɡǎrːbʊ].) (born Greta Lovisa Gustafsson; (Note: Pronounced [ˈɡrêːta lʊˈvîːsa ˈɡɵ̂sːtafˌsɔn].) 18 September 1905 – 15 April 1990) was a Swedish and American film actress. She was a leading star during Hollywood's silent and early golden eras. Regarded as one of the greatest screen actresses of all time, she is known for her melancholic and somber screen persona, her film portrayals of tragic characters, and her subtle and understated performances. In 1999, the American Film Institute ranked Garbo fifth on its list of the greatest female stars of classic Hollywood cinema.

Garbo launched her career with a supporting role in the 1924 Swedish film The Saga of Gösta Berling. Her performance caught the attention of Louis B. Mayer, chief executive of Metro-Goldwyn-Mayer (MGM), who brought her to Hollywood in 1925. She stirred interest with her first American silent film, Torrent (1926). Garbo's performance in Flesh and the Devil (1926), her third movie in the United States, made her an international star. In 1928, Garbo starred in A Woman of Affairs, which catapulted her to MGM's highest box-office star, surpassing the long-reigning Lillian Gish. Other well-known Garbo films from the silent era are The Mysterious Lady (1928), The Single Standard (1929), and The Kiss (1929).

With Garbo's first sound film, Anna Christie (1930), MGM marketers enticed the public with the tagline "Garbo talks!" That same year she starred in Romance and for her performances in both films she received her first combined nomination out of three nominations for the Academy Award for Best Actress. By 1932, her success allowed her to dictate the terms of her contracts and she became increasingly selective about her roles. She continued in films such as Mata Hari (1931), Susan Lenox (Her Fall and Rise) (1931), Grand Hotel (1932), Queen Christina (1933), and Anna Karenina (1935).

Many critics and film historians consider her performance as the doomed courtesan Marguerite Gautier in Camille (1936) to be her finest and the role gained her a third Academy Award nomination. However, Garbo's career eventually declined and she became one of many stars labelled box office poison in 1938. Her career revived with a turn to comedy in Ninotchka (1939), which earned her a fourth Academy Award nomination. Two-Faced Woman (1941), which received poor reviews, was the last of her 28 feature films. Following this commercial failure, she continued to be offered movie roles, though she declined most of them. Those she did accept failed to materialize, either due to lack of funds or because she dropped out during filming. In 1954, Garbo was awarded an Academy Honorary Award "for her luminous and unforgettable screen performances".

Over time, Garbo would decline all opportunities to return to the screen. In her retirement, she shunned publicity, led a private life, and became an art collector whose paintings included works by Pierre-Auguste Renoir, Pierre Bonnard and Kees van Dongen. Although she refused throughout her life to talk to friends about her reasons for retiring, four years before her death, she told Swedish biographer Sven Broman: "I was tired of Hollywood. I did not like my work. There were many days when I had to force myself to go to the studio ... I really wanted to live another life."

== Early life and education ==
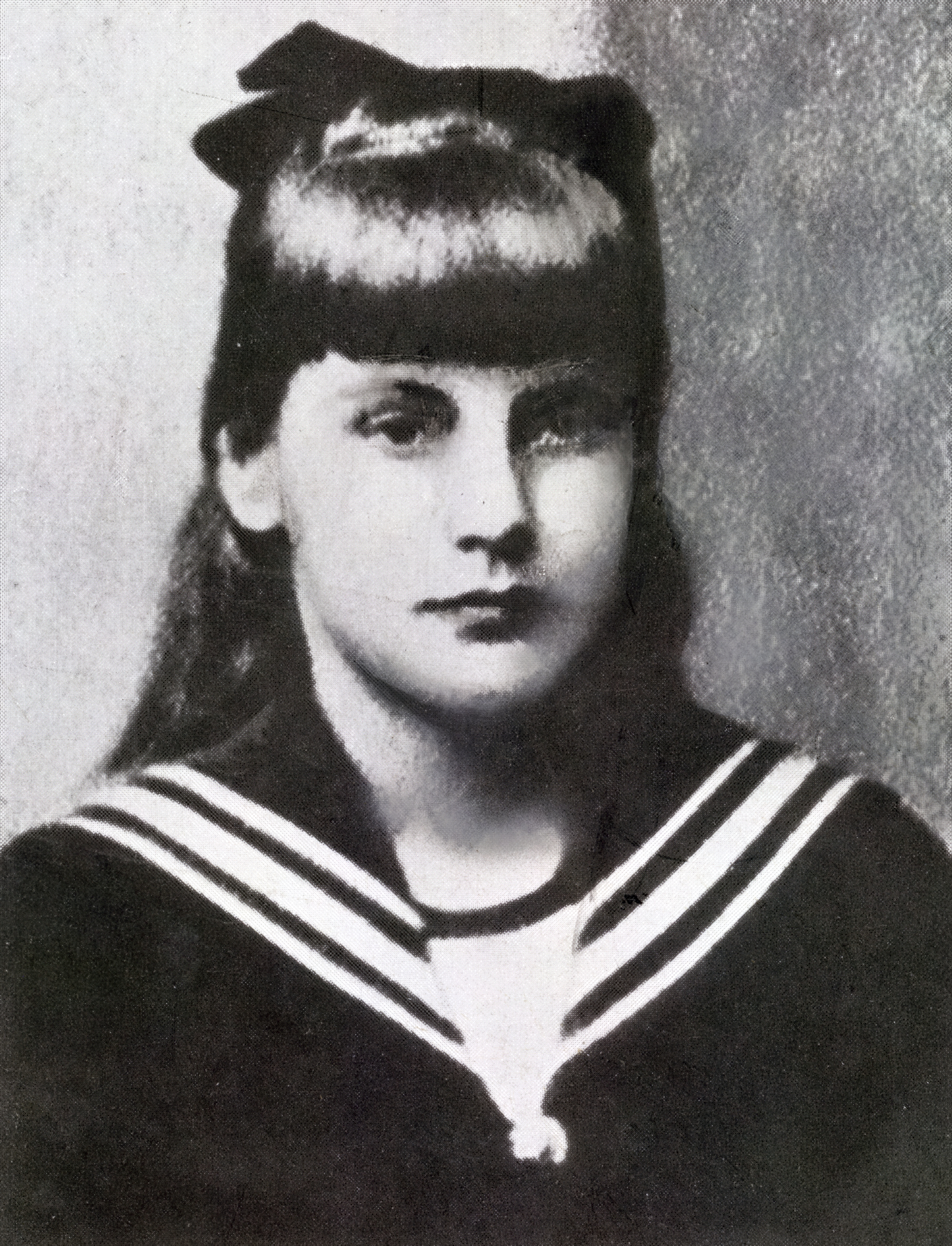
Ten-year-old Garbo in 1915

Greta Lovisa Gustafsson was born in Södermalm, Stockholm, Sweden at 7:30 p.m. She was the third, and youngest, child of Anna Lovisa (née Karlsson, 1872–1944), who worked at a jam factory, and Karl Alfred Gustafsson (1871–1920), a laborer. She had an older brother, Sven Alfred (1898–1967), and an older sister, Alva Maria (1903–1926). Garbo was nicknamed Kata, which was how she had mispronounced her first name, for the first ten years of her life.

Her parents met in Stockholm, where her father had been visiting from Frinnaryd. He moved to Stockholm to become independent and worked as a street cleaner, grocer, factory worker and butcher's assistant. He married Anna, who moved from Högsby. The family was impoverished and lived in a three-bedroom cold-water flat at Blekingegatan No. 32. They raised their three children in a working-class district regarded as the city's slum. Garbo later recalled:

It was eternally grey—those long winter's nights. My father would be sitting in a corner, scribbling figures on a newspaper. On the other side of the room, my mother is repairing ragged old clothes, sighing. We children would be talking in very low voices, or just sitting silently. We were filled with anxiety, as if there were danger in the air. Such evenings are unforgettable for a sensitive girl, but also for a girl like me. Where we lived, all the houses and apartments looked alike, their ugliness matched by everything surrounding us.

Garbo was a shy daydreamer as a child. She disliked school and preferred to play alone. She was a natural leader who became interested in theatre at an early age. She directed her friends in make-believe games and performances, and dreamed of becoming an actress. Later, she would participate in amateur theatre with her friends and frequent the Mosebacke Theatre. At the age of 13, Garbo graduated from school, and, typical of a Swedish working-class girl at that time, she did not attend high school. She later acknowledged a resulting inferiority complex.

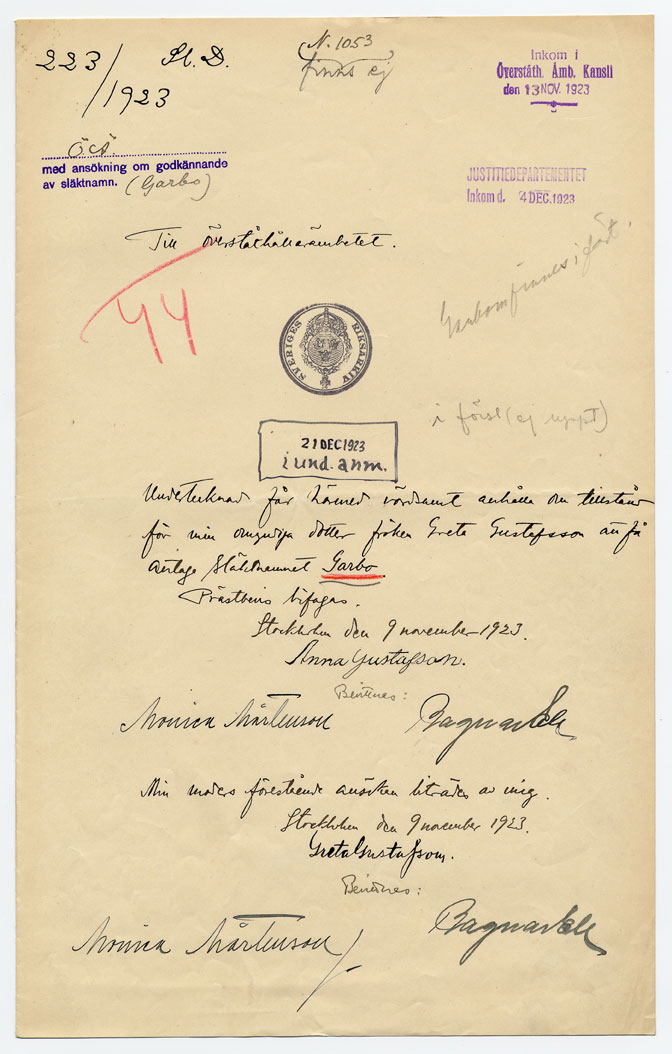
The approved application by Greta's mother to allow her name change from Gustafsson to Garbo.

The Spanish flu spread throughout Stockholm in the winter of 1919 and her father, to whom she was very close, became ill and lost his job. Garbo cared for him, taking him to the hospital for weekly treatments. He died in 1920 when she was 14 years old.

== Career ==
=== 1920–1924: Beginnings ===
Garbo first worked as a soap-lather girl in a barber shop before taking a job in the PUB department store where she ran errands and worked in the millinery department. After modeling hats for the store's catalogues, Garbo earned a more lucrative job as a fashion model at Nordiska Kompaniet. In 1920, a director of film commercials for the store cast Garbo in roles advertising women's clothing. Her first commercial premiered on 12 December 1920. In 1922, Garbo caught the attention of director Erik A. Petschler, who gave her a part, credited as Greta Gustafson, in his short comedy Peter the Tramp, released as Luffar-Petter.

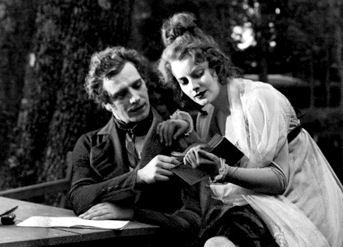
Garbo in her first leading role in the Swedish film The Saga of Gösta Berling (1924) with Lars Hanson

From 1922 to 1924, she studied at the Royal Dramatic Training Academy in Stockholm. She was recruited in 1924 by the Finnish director Mauritz Stiller to play a principal part in his film The Saga of Gösta Berling, a dramatization of the famous novel by Nobel Prize winner Selma Lagerlöf, which also featured the actor Lars Hanson. Stiller became her mentor, training her as a film actress and managing all aspects of her nascent career. She followed her role in Gösta Berling with a starring role in the German film Die freudlose Gasse (Joyless Street or The Street of Sorrow, 1925), directed by G. W. Pabst and co-starring Asta Nielsen. She praised Asta and said: "In terms of expression and versatility, I am nothing to her."

Accounts differ on the circumstances of her first contract with Louis B. Mayer, at that time vice president and general manager of Metro-Goldwyn-Mayer. Victor Seastrom, a respected Swedish director at MGM, was a friend of Stiller and encouraged Mayer to meet him on a trip to Berlin. There are two recent versions of what happened next. In one, Mayer, always looking for new talent, had done his research and was interested in Stiller. He made an offer, but Stiller demanded that Garbo be part of any contract, convinced that she would be an asset to his career. Mayer balked, but eventually agreed to a private viewing of Gösta Berling. He was immediately struck by Garbo's magnetism and became more interested in her than in Stiller. "It was her eyes," his daughter recalled him saying, "I can make a star out of her." In the second version, Mayer had already seen Gösta Berling before his Berlin trip, and Garbo, not Stiller, was his primary interest. On the way to the screening, Mayer said to his daughter: "This director is wonderful, but what we really ought to look at is the girl ... The girl, look at the girl!" After the screening, his daughter reported, he was unwavering: "I'll take her without him. I'll take her with him. Number one is the girl."

=== 1925–1929: Silent film stardom ===
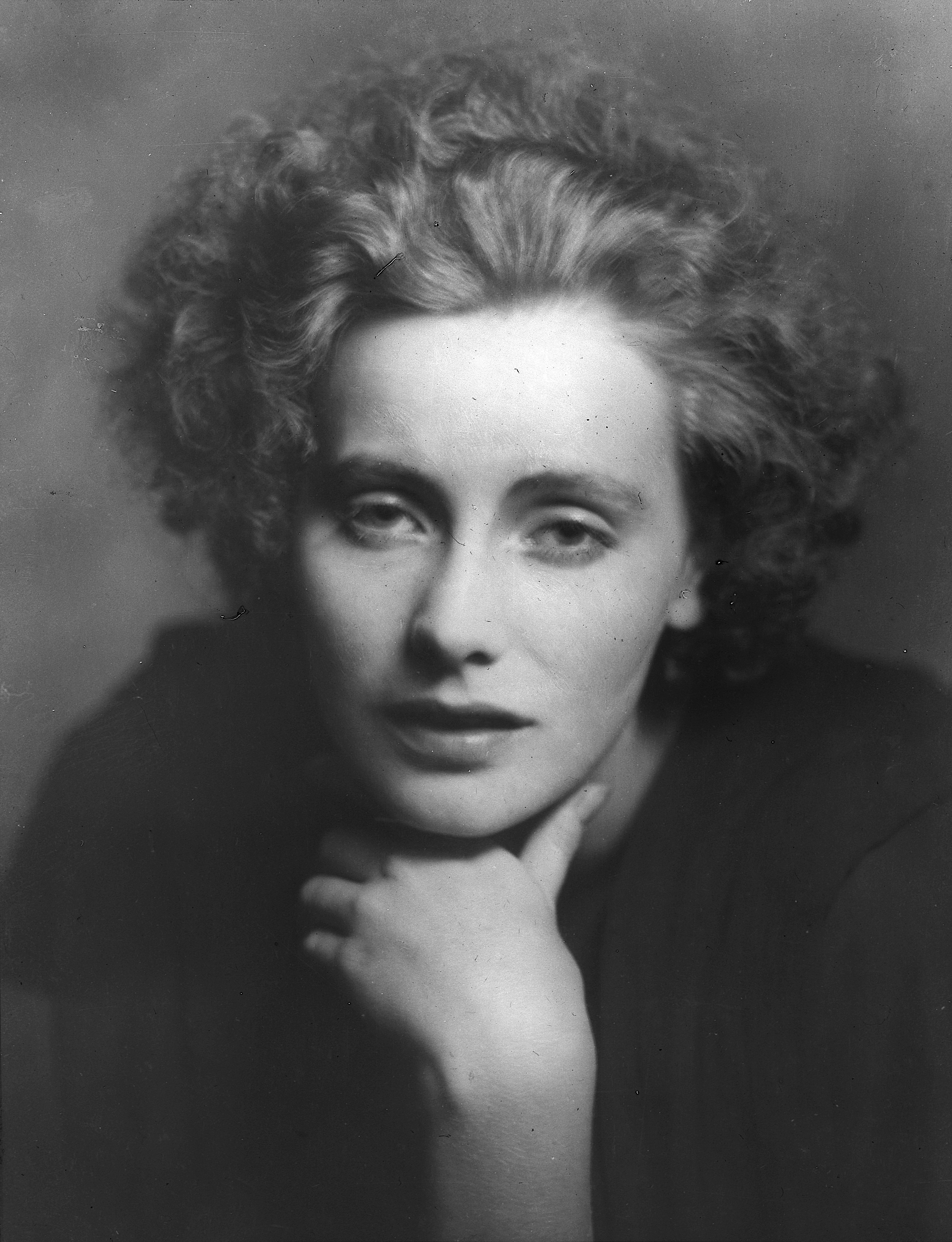
Portrait photograph of Greta Garbo, 1925

In 1925, Garbo, who was unable to speak English, was brought to Hollywood from Sweden at the request of Mayer. After a 10-day crossing on the Drottningholm in July, Garbo and Stiller arrived in New York where they remained for more than six months without word from MGM. They decided to travel to Los Angeles on their own but another five weeks passed without contact from the studio. On the verge of returning to Sweden, Garbo wrote her boyfriend back home, "You're quite right when you think I don't feel at home here ... Oh, you lovely little Sweden, I promise that when I return to you, my sad face will smile as never before." A Swedish friend in Los Angeles helped by contacting MGM production boss Irving Thalberg, who agreed to give Garbo a screen test. According to author Frederick Sands, "the result of the test was electrifying. Thalberg was impressed and began grooming the young actress the following day, arranging to fix her teeth, making sure she lost weight and giving her English lessons."

During her rise to stardom, film historian Mark Vieira notes, "Thalberg decreed that henceforth, Garbo would play a young, but worldly wise, woman." However, according to Thalberg's actress wife, Norma Shearer, Garbo did not necessarily agree with his ideas stating "Miss Garbo at first didn't like playing the exotic, the sophisticated, the woman of the world. She used to complain, "Mr. Thalberg, I am just a young gur-rl!" Irving tossed it off with a laugh. With those elegant pictures, he was creating the Garbo image". Although she expected to work with Stiller on her first film, she was cast in Torrent (1926), an adaptation of a novel by Vicente Blasco Ibáñez, with director Monta Bell. She replaced Aileen Pringle, 10 years her senior, and played a peasant girl turned singer, opposite Ricardo Cortez. Torrent was a hit, and, despite its cool reception by the trade press, Garbo's performance was well received.

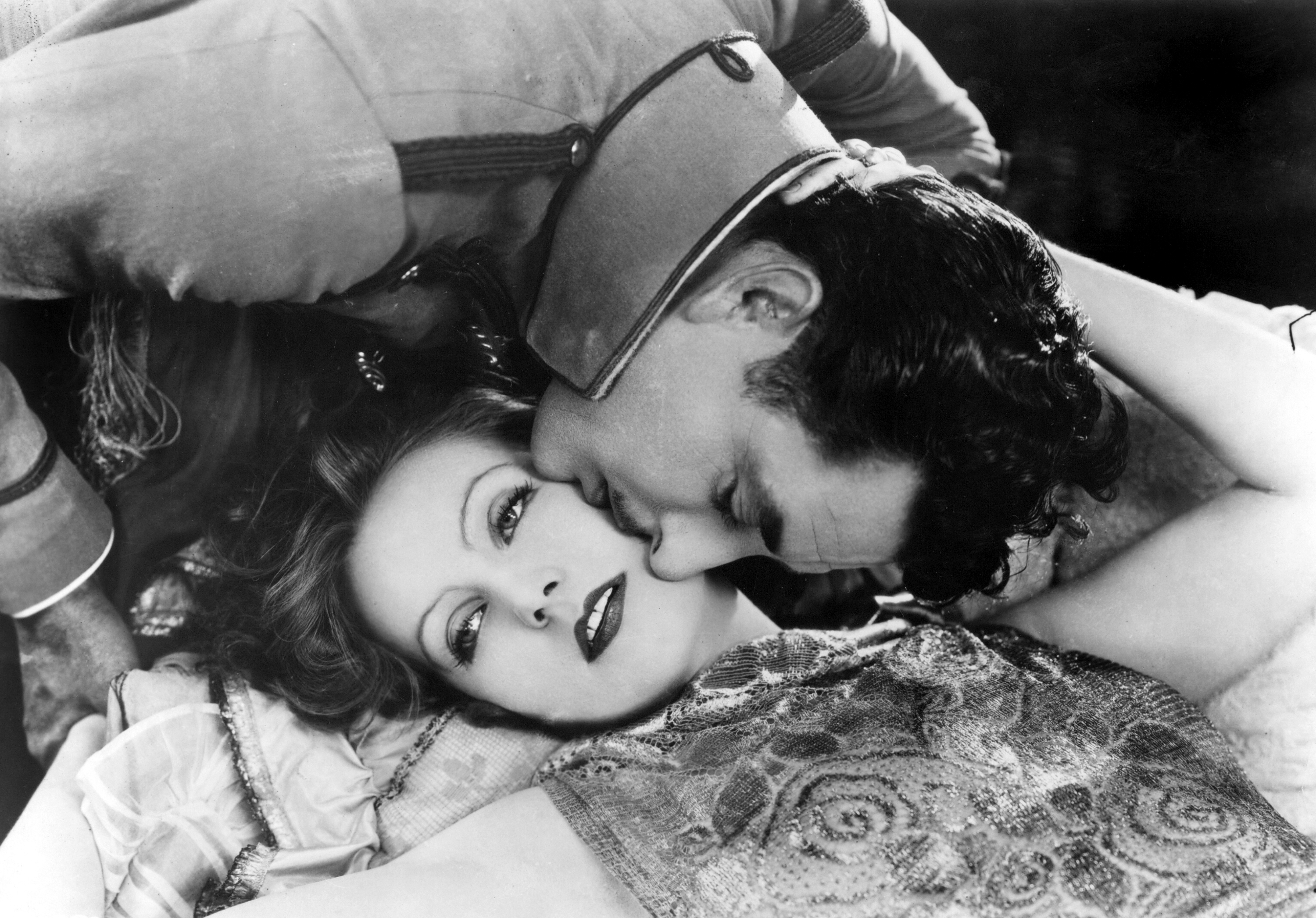
Garbo in Flesh and the Devil (1926) with John Gilbert

Garbo's success in her first American film led Thalberg to cast her in a similar role in The Temptress (1926), based on another Ibáñez novel. In this, her second film, she played opposite the popular star Antonio Moreno but was given top billing. Her mentor Stiller, who had persuaded her to take the part, was assigned to direct. For both Garbo (who did not want to play another vamp and did not like the script any more than she did the first one) and Stiller, The Temptress was a harrowing experience. Stiller, who spoke little English, had difficulty adapting to the studio system and did not get on with Moreno, was fired by Thalberg and replaced by Fred Niblo. Re-shooting The Temptress was expensive, and even though it became one of the top-grossing films of the 1926–1927 season, it was the only Garbo film of the period to lose money. However, Garbo received rave reviews, and MGM had a new star.

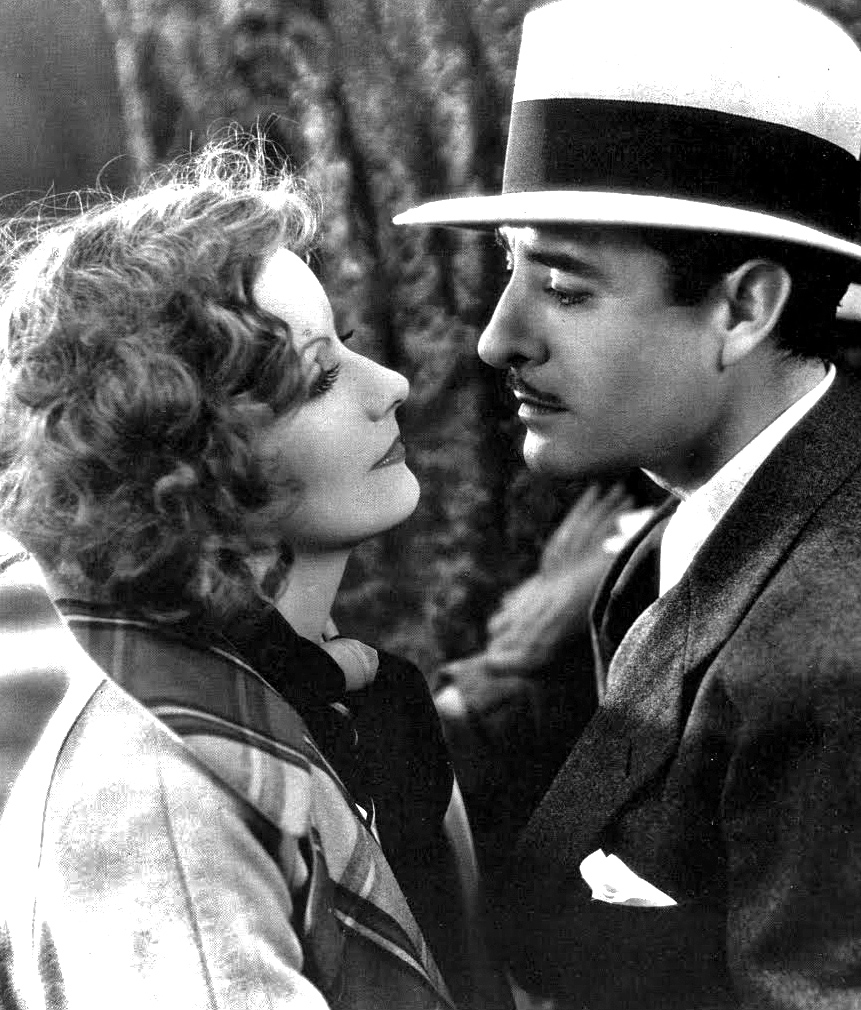
Garbo with John Gilbert in A Woman of Affairs (1928)

After her lightning ascent, Garbo made eight more silent films, and all were hits. She starred in three of them with the leading man John Gilbert. About their first movie, Flesh and the Devil (1926), silent film expert Kevin Brownlow states that "she gave a more erotic performance than Hollywood had ever seen." Their on-screen chemistry soon translated into an off-camera romance, and by the end of the production, they began living together. The film also marked a turning point in Garbo's career. Vieira wrote: "Audiences were mesmerized by her beauty and titillated by her love scenes with Gilbert. She was a sensation." Profits from her third movie with Gilbert, A Woman of Affairs (1928), catapulted her to top Metro star of the 1928–1929 box office season, usurping the long-reigned silent queen Lillian Gish. In 1929, reviewer Pierre de Rohan wrote in the New York Telegraph: "She has glamour and fascination for both sexes which have never been equaled on the screen."

The impact of Garbo's acting and screen presence quickly established her reputation as one of Hollywood's greatest actresses. Film historian and critic David Denby argues that Garbo introduced a subtlety of expression to the art of silent acting and that its effect on audiences cannot be exaggerated. She "lowers her head to look calculating or flutters her lips," he says. "Her face darkens with a slight tightening around the eyes and mouth; she registers a passing idea with a contraction of her brows or a drooping of her lids. Worlds turned on her movements."

During this period, Garbo began to require unusual conditions during the shooting of her scenes. She prohibited visitors—including the studio brass—from her sets and demanded that black flats or screens surround her to prevent extras and technicians from watching her. When asked about these eccentric requirements, she said: "If I am by myself, my face will do things I cannot do with it otherwise."

Despite her status as a star of silent films, the studio feared that her Swedish accent might impair her work in sound, and delayed the shift for as long as possible. MGM itself was the last Hollywood studio to convert to sound, and Garbo's last silent film, The Kiss (1929), was also the studio's. Despite the fears, Garbo became one of the biggest box-office draws of the next decade.

=== 1930–1939: Transition to sound and continued success ===
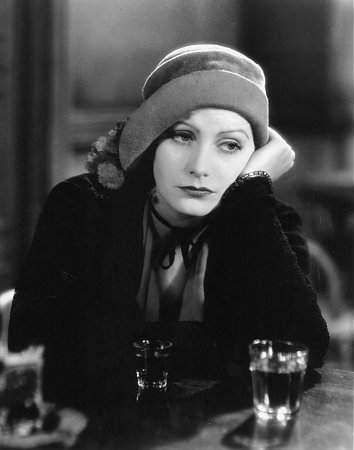
Garbo in her first sound film Anna Christie (1930).

In late 1929, MGM cast Garbo in Anna Christie (1930), a film adaptation of the 1922 play by Eugene O'Neill, her first speaking role. The screenplay was adapted by Frances Marion, and the film was produced by Irving Thalberg and Paul Bern. Sixteen minutes into the film, she famously utters her first line, "Gimme a whiskey, ginger ale on the side, and don't be stingy, baby." The film premiered in New York City on 21 February 1930, publicized with the catchphrase "Garbo talks!", and was the highest-grossing film of the year. Her performance received positive reviews; Mordaunt Hall of The New York Times remarked that Garbo was "even more interesting through being heard than she was in her mute portrayals. She reveals no nervousness before the microphone and her careful interpretation of Anna can scarcely be disputed." Garbo received her first Academy Award for Best Actress nomination for her performance, although she lost to MGM colleague Norma Shearer. Her nomination that year included her performance in Romance (1930). After filming ended, Garbo—along with a different director and cast—filmed a German-language version of Anna Christie that was released in December 1930. The film's success certified Garbo's successful transition to talkies. In her follow-up film, Romance, she portrayed an Italian opera star, opposite Lewis Stone. She was paired opposite Robert Montgomery in Inspiration (1931), and her profile was used to boost the career of the relatively unknown Clark Gable in Susan Lenox (Her Fall and Rise) (1931). Although the films did not match Garbo's success with her sound debut, she was ranked as the most popular female star in the United States in 1930 and 1931.

Garbo followed with two of her best-remembered roles. She played the World War I German spy in the lavish production of Mata Hari (1931), opposite Ramón Novarro. When the film was released, it "caused panic, with police reserves required to keep the waiting mob in order." The following year, she played a Russian ballerina in Grand Hotel (1932), opposite an ensemble cast, including John Barrymore, Joan Crawford, and Wallace Beery, among others. The film won that year's Academy Award for Best Picture. Both films were MGM's highest-earning films of 1931 and 1932, respectively, and Garbo was dubbed "the greatest money-making machine ever put on screen". Garbo's close friend Mercedes de Acosta then penned a screenplay for her to portray Joan of Arc, but MGM rebuffed the idea, and the project was shelved. By this time she had a fanatical worldwide following and the phenomenon of "Garbomania" reached its peak. After appearing in As You Desire Me (1932), the first of three films in which Garbo starred opposite Melvyn Douglas, her MGM contract expired, and she returned to Sweden.

In Camille (1936)

After nearly a year of negotiations, Garbo agreed to renew her contract with MGM on the condition that she would star in Queen Christina (1933), and her salary would be increased to $300,000 per film. The film's screenplay had been written by Salka Viertel; although reluctant to make the movie, MGM relented at Garbo's insistence. For her leading man, MGM suggested Charles Boyer or Laurence Olivier, but Garbo rejected both, preferring her former co-star and lover John Gilbert. The studio balked at the idea of casting Gilbert, fearing his declining career would hurt the film's box-office, but Garbo prevailed. Queen Christina was a lavish production, becoming one of the studio's biggest productions at the time. Publicized as "Garbo returns", the film premiered in December 1933 to positive reviews and box-office triumph and became the highest-grossing film of the year. The movie, however, met with controversy upon its release; censors objected to the scenes in which Garbo disguised herself as a man and kissed a female co-star.

Although her domestic popularity was undiminished in the early 1930s, high profits for Garbo's films after Queen Christina depended on the foreign market for their success. The type of historical and melodramatic films she began to make on the advice of Viertel were highly successful abroad, but considerably less so in the United States. In the midst of the Great Depression, American screen audiences seemed to favor "home-grown" screen couples, such as Clark Gable and Jean Harlow. David O. Selznick wanted to cast Garbo as the dying heiress in Dark Victory (eventually released in 1939 with other leads), but she chose Leo Tolstoy's Anna Karenina (1935), in which she played another of her renowned roles. Her performance won her the New York Film Critics Circle Award for Best Actress. The film was successful in international markets, and had better domestic rentals than MGM anticipated. Still, its profit was significantly diminished because of Garbo's exorbitant salary.

Garbo selected George Cukor's romantic drama Camille (1936) as her next project. Thalberg cast her opposite Robert Taylor and former co-star, Lionel Barrymore. Cukor carefully crafted Garbo's portrayal of Marguerite Gautier, a lower-class woman, who becomes the world-renowned mistress Camille. Production was marred, however, by the sudden death of Thalberg, then only thirty-seven, which plunged the Hollywood studios into a "state of profound shock", writes David Bret. Garbo had grown close to Thalberg and his wife, Norma Shearer, and had often dropped by their house unannounced. Her grief for Thalberg, some believe, was more profound than for John Gilbert, who died earlier that same year. His death also added to the sombre mood required for the closing scenes of Camille. When the film premiered in New York on 12 December 1936, it became an international success, Garbo's first major success in three years. She won the New York Film Critics Circle Award for Best Actress for her performance, and she was nominated once more for an Academy Award. Garbo regarded Camille as her favorite out of all of her films.

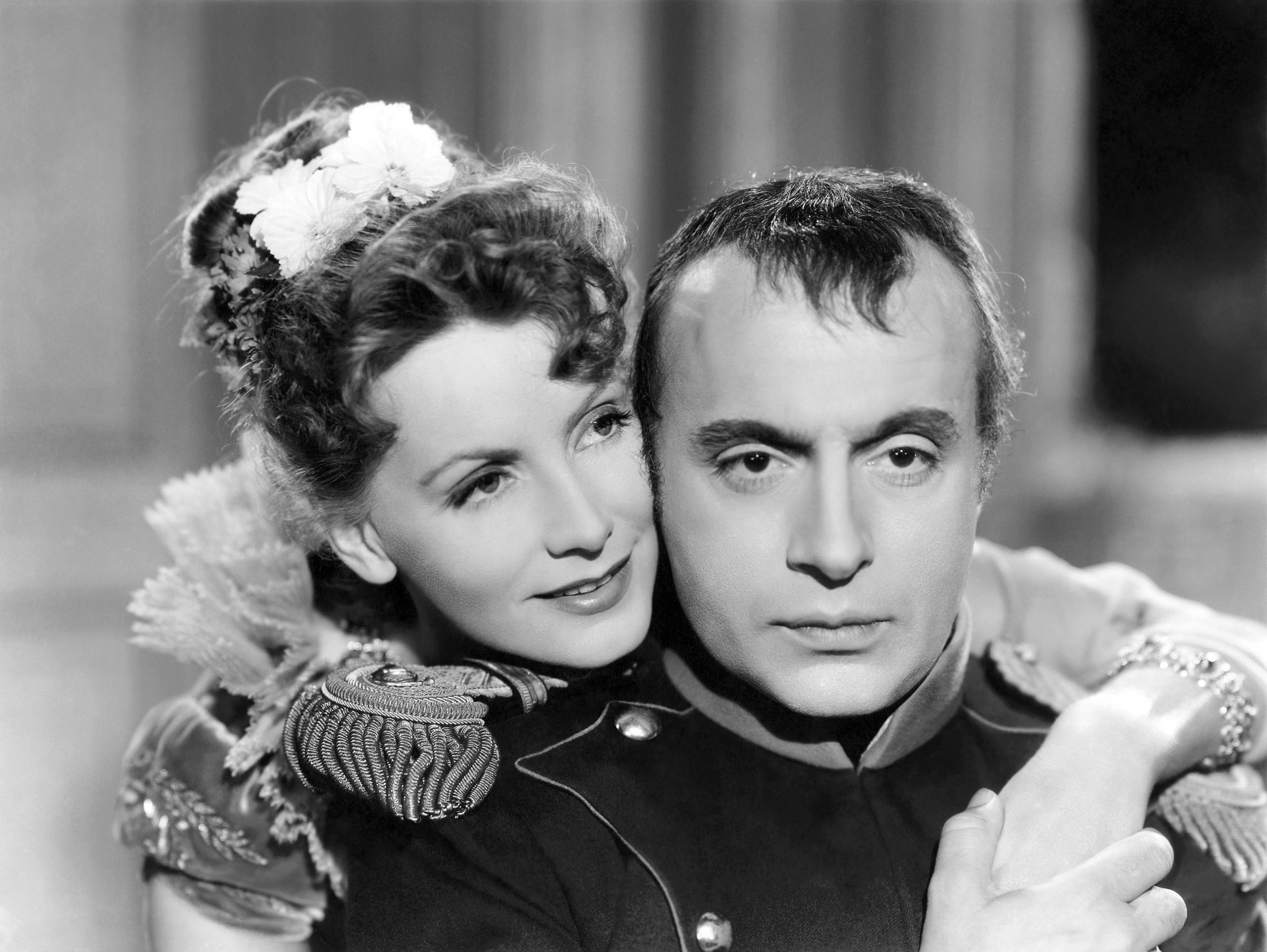
Garbo and Charles Boyer in Conquest (1937)

Garbo's follow-up project was Clarence Brown's lavish production of Conquest (1937), opposite Charles Boyer. The plot was the dramatized romance between Napoleon and Marie Walewska. It was MGM's biggest and most-publicized movie of its year, but upon its release, it became one of the studio's biggest failures of the decade at the box office. When her contract expired soon thereafter, she returned briefly to Sweden. On 3 May 1938, Garbo was among the many stars—including Joan Crawford, Norma Shearer, Luise Rainer, Katharine Hepburn, Mae West, Marlene Dietrich, Fred Astaire, and Dolores del Río, among others—dubbed to be "Box Office Poison" in an article published by Harry Brandt on behalf of the Independent Theatre Owners of America.

After the box-office failure of Conquest, MGM decided a change of pace was needed to resurrect Garbo's career. For her next movie, the studio teamed her with producer-director Ernst Lubitsch to film Ninotchka (1939), her first comedy. The film was one of the first Hollywood movies which, under the cover of a satirical, light romance, depicted the Soviet Union under Joseph Stalin as being rigid and gray when compared to Paris in its pre-war years. Ninotchka premiered in October 1939, publicized with the catchphrase "Garbo laughs!", commenting on the departure of Garbo's serious and melancholy image as she transferred to comedy. Favoured by critics and box-office success in the United States and abroad, it was banned in the Soviet Union.

=== 1941–1948: Last work and retirement ===
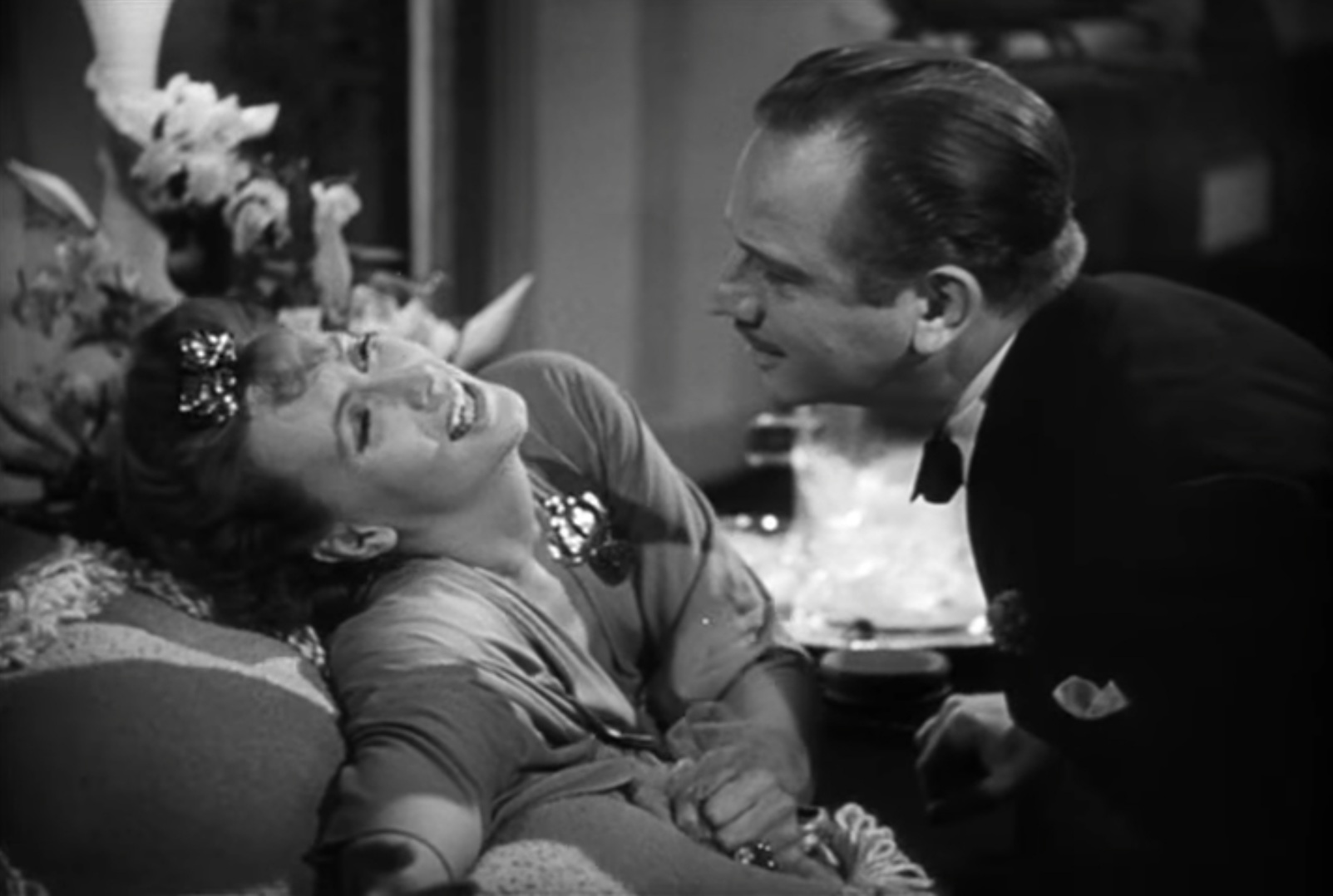
Garbo and Melvyn Douglas in Two-Faced Woman (1941)

With George Cukor's Two-Faced Woman (1941), MGM attempted to capitalize on Garbo's success in Ninotchka by re-teaming her with Melvyn Douglas in another romantic comedy which sought to transform her into a chic, modern woman. She played a "double" role that featured her dancing the rhumba, swimming, and skiing. The film was a critical failure, but, contrary to popular belief, it performed reasonably well at the box office. Garbo referred to the film as "my grave". Two-Faced Woman was her last film; she was thirty-six and had made 28 feature films in a span of 16 years.

Although Garbo felt humiliated by the negative reviews of Two-Faced Woman, she did not intend to retire at first. But her films depended on the European market, and when it fell through because of the war, finding a vehicle was problematic for MGM. Garbo signed a one-picture deal in 1942 to make The Girl from Leningrad, but the project quickly dissolved. She still thought she would continue when the war was over, though she was ambivalent and indecisive about returning to the screen. Salka Viertel, Garbo's close friend and collaborator, said in 1945: "Greta is impatient to work. But on the other side, she's afraid of it." Garbo also worried about her age. "Time leaves traces on our small faces and bodies. It's not the same anymore, being able to pull it off." George Cukor, director of Two-Faced Woman, and often blamed for its failure, said: "People often glibly say that the failure of Two-Faced Woman finished Garbo's career. That's a grotesque over-simplification. It certainly threw her, but I think that what really happened was that she just gave up. She didn't want to go on."

Still, Garbo signed a contract in 1948 with producer Walter Wanger, who had produced Queen Christina, to shoot a picture based on Balzac's La Duchesse de Langeais. Max Ophüls was slated to adapt and direct. She made several screen tests, learned the script, and arrived in Rome in the summer of 1949 to shoot the picture. However, the financing failed to materialize, and the project was abandoned. The screen tests—the last time Garbo stepped in front of a movie camera—were thought to have been lost for 41 years until they were re-discovered in 1990 by film historians Leonard Maltin and Jeanine Basinger. Parts of the footage were included in the 2005 TCM documentary Garbo.

In 1949, she was offered the role of fictional silent-film star Norma Desmond in Sunset Boulevard, directed by Ninotchka co-writer Billy Wilder. However, after a meeting with film producer Charles Brackett, she insisted that she had no interest in the part whatsoever.

She was offered many roles in the 1940s as well as throughout her retirement years but rejected all but a few of them. In the few instances when she did accept them, the slightest problem led her to drop out. Although she refused throughout her life to talk to friends about her reasons for retiring, four years before her death, she told Swedish biographer Sven Broman: "I was tired of Hollywood. I did not like my work. There were many days when I had to force myself to go to the studio ... I really wanted to live another life."

== Public persona ==
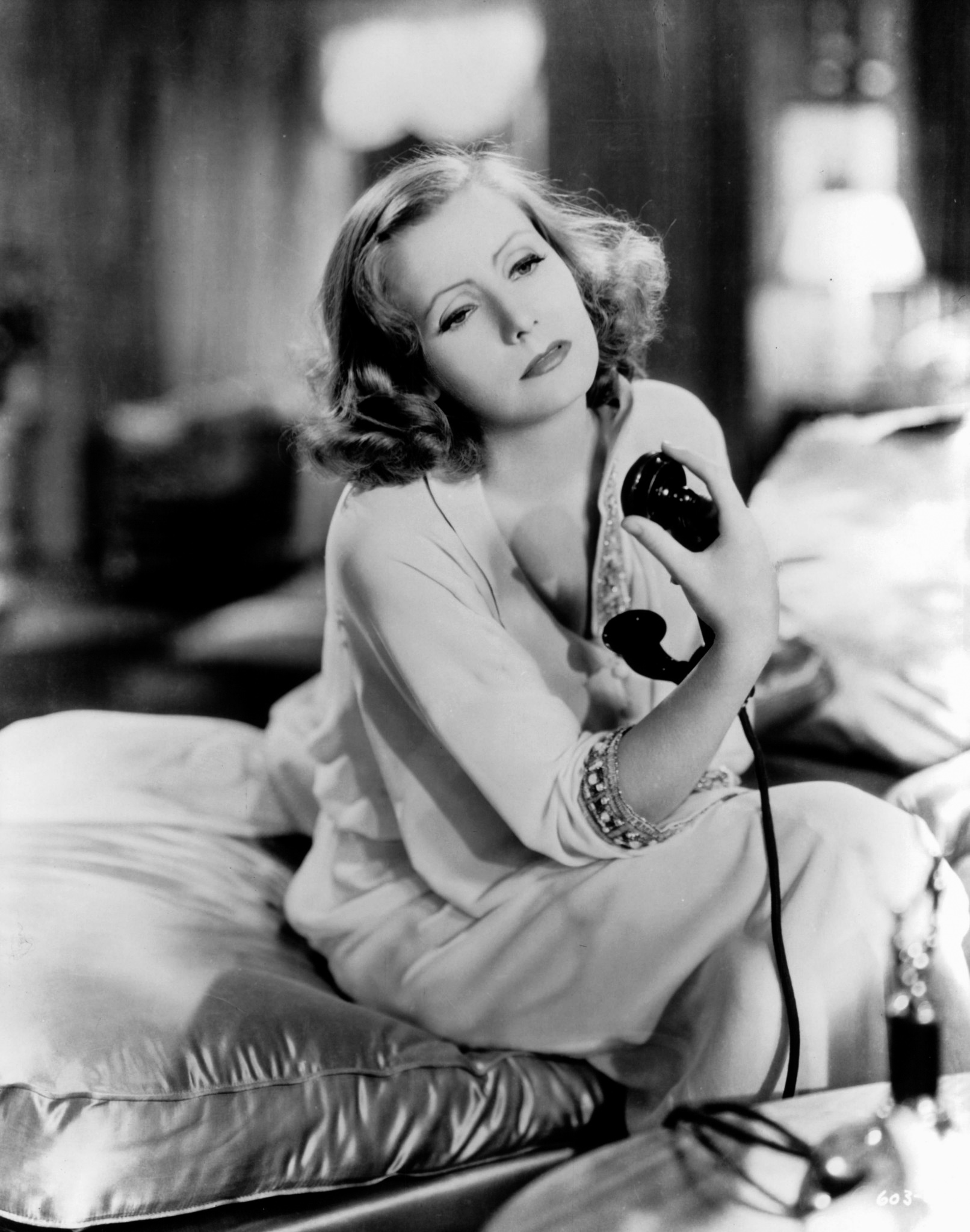
Garbo in Grand Hotel (1932), in which she said the famous line "I want to be alone." The public would long associate her with these words due to her private lifestyle.

From the early days of her career, Garbo avoided industry social functions, preferring to spend her time alone or with friends. She never signed autographs or answered fan mail, and rarely gave interviews. Nor did she ever appear at Oscar ceremonies, even when she was nominated. Her aversion to publicity and the press was undeniably genuine, and exasperating to the studio at first. In an interview in 1928, she explained that her desire for privacy began when she was a child, stating, "As early as I can remember, I have wanted to be alone. I've always been moody. I detest crowds, I don't like many people." The artist James Montgomery Flagg said in 1933 that when he was allowed to sketch Garbo at a director's party in Hollywood some years earlier she told him she suffered from melancholia. At that time she had a Swedish phonograph record of laughs of all kinds which she played when visiting, to observe her hosts' response. In 1937, in a letter to her friend, Austrian actress and writer Salka Viertel, she wrote: "I go nowhere, see no one... It is hard and sad to be alone, but sometimes it's even more difficult to be with someone..." In another letter in 1970 she wrote: "I feel very tired and cannot seem to get myself together to plan where to go... I am sorry but something always seem to go a little wrong with me, and it is not in my head either..."

Because Garbo was suspicious and mistrustful of the media, and often at odds with MGM executives, she spurned Hollywood's publicity rules. She was routinely referred to by the press as the "Swedish Sphinx". Her reticence and fear of strangers perpetuated the mystery and mystique she projected both on screen and in real life. MGM eventually capitalized on it, for it bolstered the image of the silent and reclusive woman of mystery. In spite of her strenuous efforts to avoid publicity, Garbo paradoxically became one of the twentieth century's most publicized women. She is closely associated with a line from Grand Hotel, one which the American Film Institute in 2005 voted the 30th-most memorable movie quote of all time, "I want to be alone; I just want to be alone." The theme was a running gag in her movies that began during the silent period. (Note: For example, in Love (1927), a title card reads, "I like to be alone"; in The Single Standard (1929), her character says: "I am walking alone because I want to be alone"; in the same film, she sails to the South Seas with her lover on a boat called the All Alone; in Susan Lenox (Her Fall and Rise) (1931), she says to a suitor: "This time, I rise ... and fall ... alone"; in Inspiration (1931), she tells a fickle lover: "I just want to be alone for a little while"; in Mata Hari (1931), she says to her new amour: "I never look ahead. By next spring, I shall probably be ... quite alone." By the early 1930s, the motif had become indelibly linked to Garbo's public and private personae. It is lampooned in Ninotchka (1939) when emissaries from Russia ask her: "Do you want to be alone, comrade?" "No", she says bluntly. But about her private life, she later remarked: "I never said, 'I want to be alone'; I only said, 'I want to be let alone.' There is a world of difference.") According to a 1955 piece in LIFE magazine, Garbo explained that she'd said: "I want to be let alone", not "I want to be alone".

=== Fashion and personal style ===
After starring in Torrent (1926), she became known as "the Art Deco Diva". She favored men's shoes and clothes and her style has been described as "trench coat, simple shoes, shirts, cigarette pants, slouch hat and big sunglasses." Garbo has been credited with popularizing the "slouchy hat".

== Personal life ==
=== Retirement ===
In her retirement, Garbo generally led a private life of simplicity and leisure. She made no public appearances and assiduously avoided the publicity she loathed. Contrary to myth, from the beginning she had many friends and acquaintances with whom she socialized and travelled, although it has also been said that in later years she did not trust many people and therefore did not have many close friends. Her usual response to anyone asking her about a comeback was "I have made enough faces", as she once said to David Niven.

Garbo was often perplexed about what to do and how to spend her time, always struggling with her many eccentricities and her life-long melancholy and moodiness. ("Drifting" was the word she frequently used; in 1946 she told reporters, "I have no plans, either for the movies or anything else. I'm just drifting.") As she approached her sixtieth birthday in 1965, she told a frequent walking companion, "In a few days, it will be the anniversary of the sorrow that never leaves me, that will never leave me for the rest of my life." She told another friend in 1971, "I suppose I suffer from very deep depression." One biographer claims that she could have been bipolar. "I am very happy one moment, the next there is nothing left for me", she said in 1933.

Beginning in the 1940s, Garbo became an art collector. Although many of the paintings she owned were of negligible monetary value, she also owned valuable works by Renoir, Rouault, Kandinsky, Bonnard and Jawlensky. Her art collection was worth millions of dollars when she died in 1990.

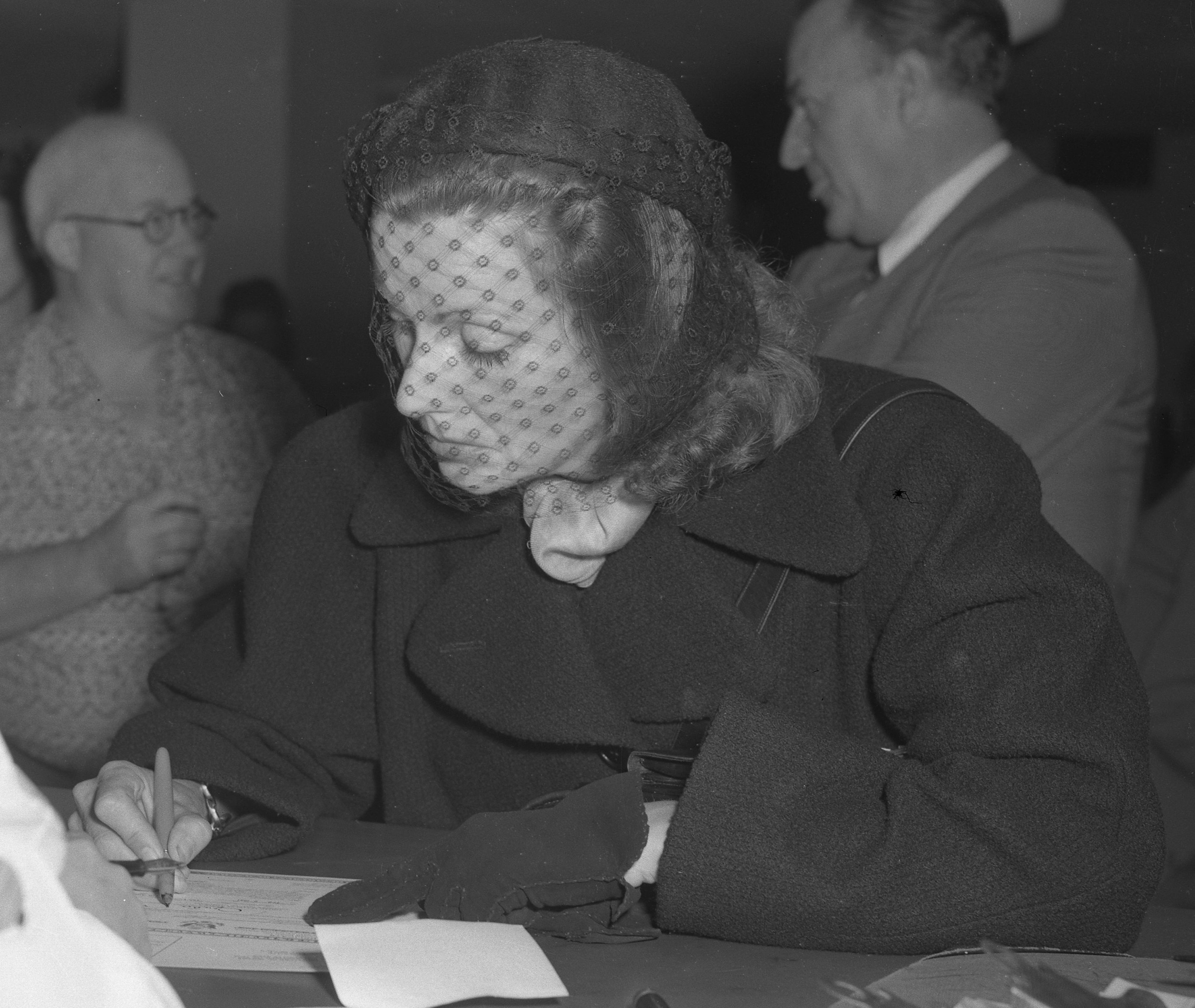
Garbo signing her US citizenship papers in February 1951

On 9 February 1951, she became a naturalized citizen of the United States, and in 1953 bought a seven-room apartment at The Campanile in Manhattan, at at 450 East 52nd Street, where she lived for the rest of her life. Her New York apartment buzzer was identified by a solitary G and the interior was a "light and airy study in pink". In order to protect her privacy, she preferred being addressed as "Miss [Harriet] Brown". Her close friends were only allowed to call her Miss Garbo or G.G.; if they called her Greta, she wouldn't respond.

Garbo was a dinner guest at the White House on 13 November 1963, just nine days before the assassination of JFK. She spent the night at the Washington, D.C. home of philanthropist Florence Stephenson Mahoney. Garbo's niece reported that Garbo had always spoken of it as a "magical evening".

Italian film director Luchino Visconti allegedly attempted to bring Garbo back to the screen in 1969 with the small part of Maria Sophia, Queen of Naples in his adaptation of Proust's Remembrance of Things Past. He exclaimed: "I am very pleased with the idea that this woman, with her severe and authoritarian presence, should figure in the decadent and rarefied climate of the world described by Proust." Claims that Garbo was interested in the part cannot be substantiated.

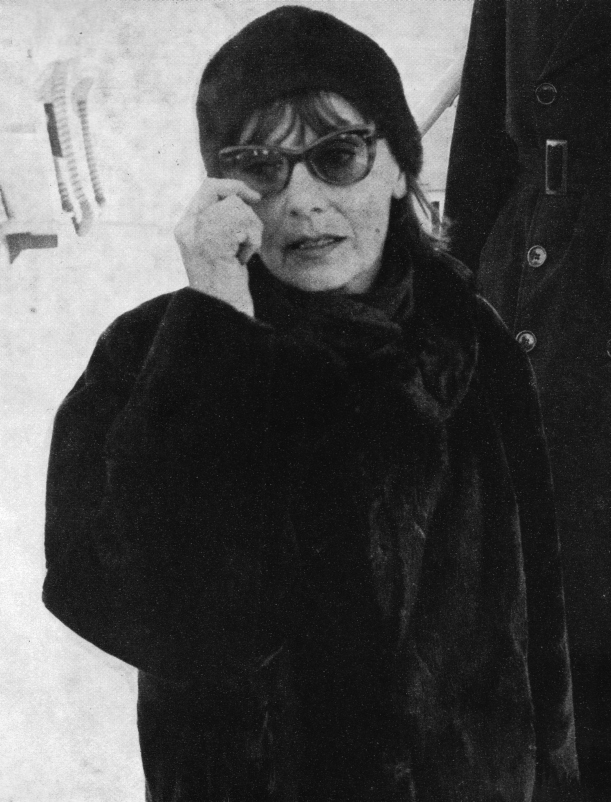
Garbo in Stockholm in 1961

Although she was increasingly withdrawn in her final years, Garbo became close to her cook and housekeeper Claire Koger, who worked for her for 31 years. "We were very close—like sisters," Koger said.

In 1970, Garbo vacationed in Saint-Raphaël on the French Riviera at the home of her close friend Baroness Cécile de Rothschild. Rothschild introduced her to American art dealer Samuel Adams Green at Garbo's 65th birthday party. Green became an important friend, sharing an interest in walking, humor, and introducing Garbo to transcendental meditation. Green accompanied her on regular walks in New York and on travels to Europe, Colombia, and Fire Island, where she stayed at his home. Their friendship was largely conducted by telephone, and Green recorded their conversations after informing Garbo of the practice. The friendship ended in 1985 after the tabloid Globe published an article claiming that Garbo planned to marry Green; Garbo blamed him for the publicity and ended their communication. Garbo had also been falsely told that Green played tapes of their conversations to friends at a party. After Garbo's death, Green donated over 100 hours of recordings to Wesleyan University. The tapes reveal Garbo's personality in later life, her sense of humor, and various eccentricities.

Throughout her life, Garbo was known for taking long daily walks with companions or by herself. In retirement, she walked the streets of New York City, dressed casually and wearing large sunglasses. "Garbo-watching" became a sport for photographers, the media, admirers, and curious New Yorkers, but she strictly maintained her privacy and her elusive mystique followed her to the end.

Norwegian actress Liv Ullmann, who was dubbed "The New Greta Garbo", and played Anna Christie on Broadway in 1977, saw Garbo in the street and ran after her, in hopes of meeting her and telling her she was playing Anna Christie. Garbo ran away from her and disappeared into Central Park. Ullmann gave up the chase after she saw that Garbo looked "frightened". She said: "Yes, she outpaced me. But when she turned and looked so frightened I gave up and didn't follow her. I was younger; I could have made it, but I didn't."

=== Relationships ===
Garbo never married, had no children, and lived alone for most of her adult life. She once said: "If I were ever to love anyone, it would be Mauritz Stiller." In 1977, Garbo wrote to Frederick Sands: "I am forever running away from something or somebody"... "Unconsciously I have always known that I was not destined for real and lasting happiness."

Her most famous romance was with her frequent MGM co-star John Gilbert, with whom she lived intermittently in 1926 and 1927. Soon after their romance began, Gilbert began helping her develop acting skills on the set and teaching her how to behave like a star, socialize at parties, and deal with studio bosses. They co-starred again in three more hits: Love (1927), A Woman of Affairs (1928), and Queen Christina (1933). Gilbert allegedly proposed to Garbo numerous times and she finally accepted, but backed out just before the wedding. "I was in love with him," she said. "But I froze. I was afraid he would tell me what to do and boss me. I always wanted to be the boss." In later years when asked about Gilbert, Garbo said "I can't remember what I ever saw in him." According to Ava Gardner's autobiography, Garbo admitted to her that Gilbert was the only man she'd ever really loved but he had "let [her] down" by having a "superstitious affair" with "a little extra" during their last film and she had never forgiven him.

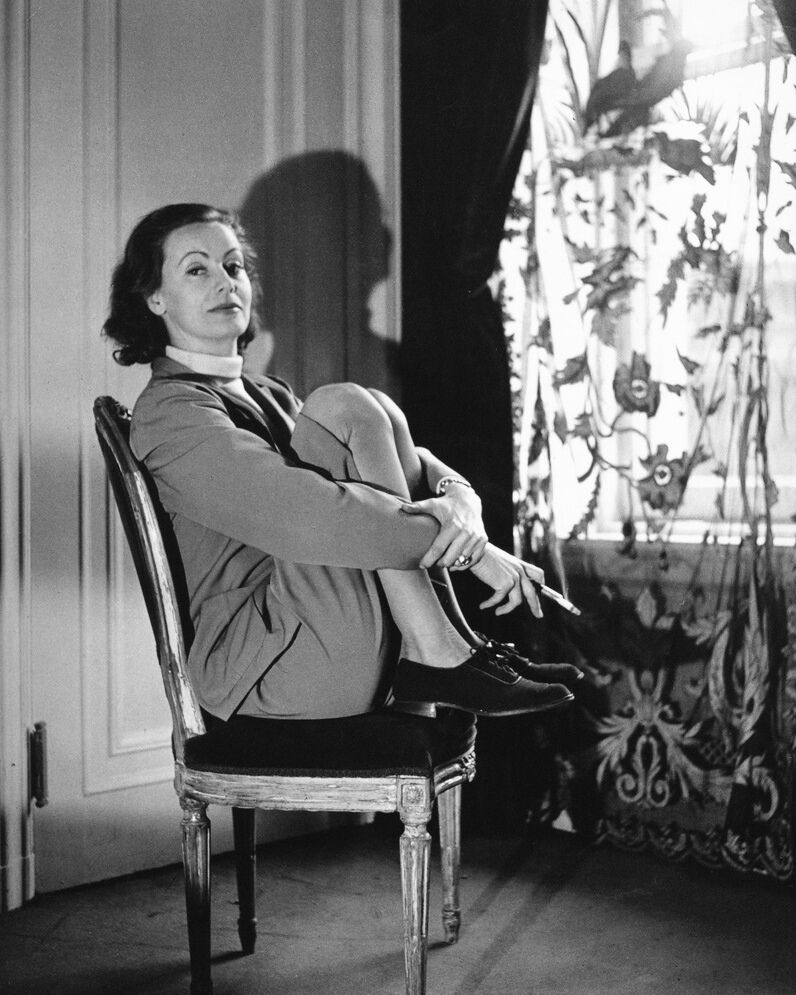
Garbo photographed by Cecil Beaton, 1946

In 1937, Garbo met Leopold Stokowski, then conductor of the Philadelphia Orchestra, with whom she had a brief, but highly publicized relationship while the pair traveled throughout Europe the following year; whether the relationship was romantic or platonic is uncertain. In his diary, German novelist Erich Maria Remarque discusses a liaison with Garbo in 1941, and in his memoir, British photographer Cecil Beaton described an affair with her in 1947 and 1948. They maintained a romantic friendship for several years, during which Beaton hoped to marry her, though his feelings were often unreciprocated as he competed with George Schlee for her affection. He later reflected, "Greta was a full-time job and an anxiety as well as a pleasure."

In 1941, Garbo met the Russian-born millionaire George Schlee, who was introduced to her by his wife, fashion designer Valentina. Nicholas Turner, Garbo's close friend for 33 years, said that, after she bought an apartment in the same building, "Garbo moved in and took Schlee from Valentina right away." Schlee would divide his time between the two, becoming Garbo's close companion and advisor until his death in 1964.

Recent biographers and others have speculated that, because it can be assumed she had intimate relationships with women as well as men, Garbo was bisexual, possibly even "predominantly lesbian". (Note: Attributed to multiple references:) In 1927, Garbo was introduced to stage and screen actress Lilyan Tashman, and they may have had an affair, according to some writers. Silent film star Louise Brooks stated that she and Garbo had a brief liaison the following year.

In 1931, Garbo befriended the writer and acknowledged lesbian Mercedes de Acosta, whom she met through Salka Viertel, and, according to Garbo's and de Acosta's biographers, began a sporadic and volatile romance. The two remained friends—with ups and downs—for almost 30 years, during which time Garbo wrote de Acosta 181 letters, cards, and telegrams, now at the Rosenbach Museum and Library in Philadelphia. Garbo's family, which controls her estate, has made only 87 of these items publicly available.

In 2005, Mimi Pollak's estate released 60 letters Garbo had written to her in their long correspondence. Several letters suggest she may have had romantic feelings for Pollak for many years. After learning of Pollak's pregnancy in 1930, for example, Garbo wrote: "We cannot help our nature, as God has created it. But I have always thought you and I belonged together." In 1975, she wrote a poem about not being able to touch the hand of her friend with whom she might have been walking through life.

== Death ==
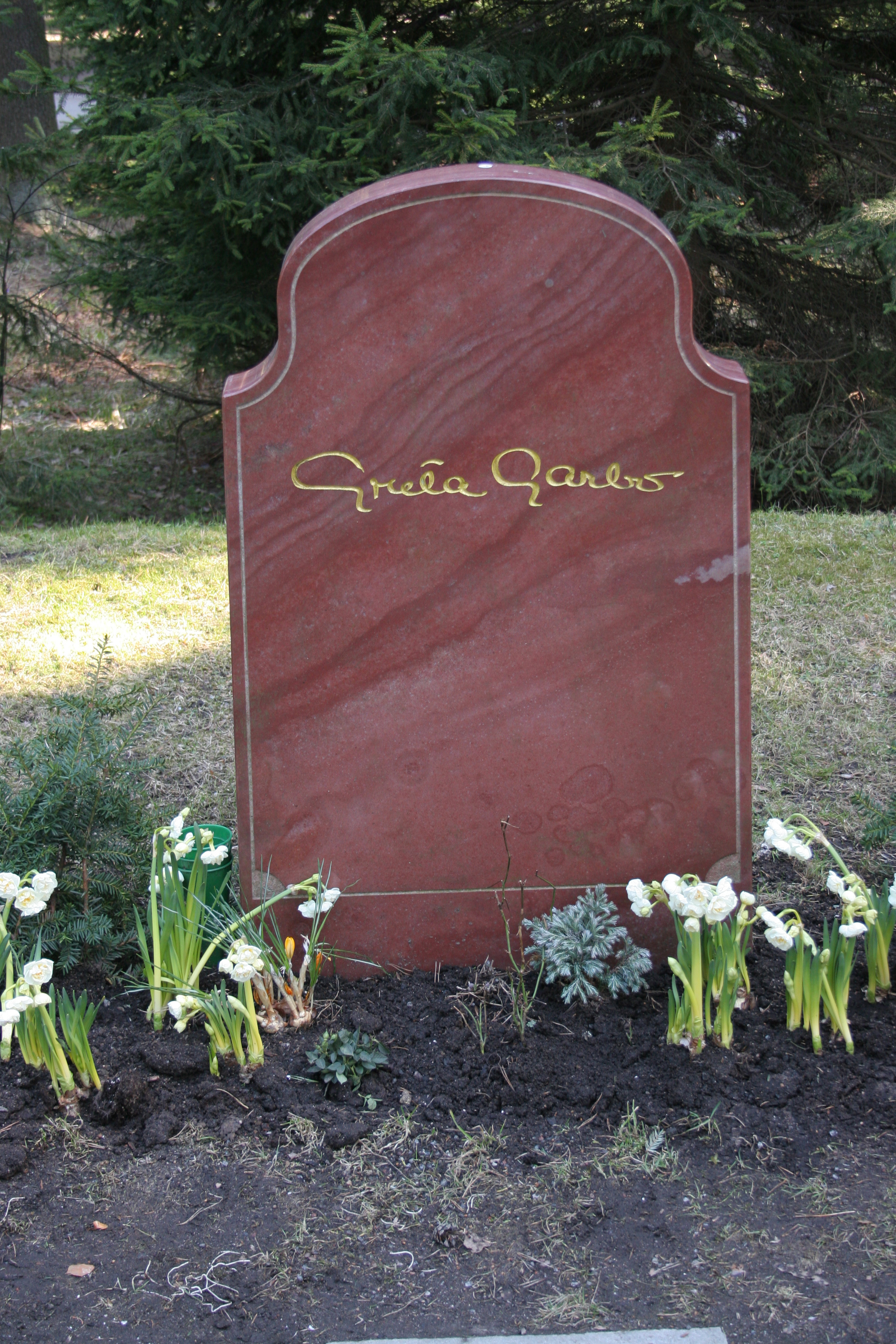
Garbo's grave at Skogskyrkogården Cemetery in Stockholm

Garbo was successfully treated for breast cancer in 1984. Towards the end of her life, only Garbo's closest friends knew she was receiving six-hour dialysis treatments three times a week at The Rogosin Institute in New York Hospital. A photograph appeared in the media in early 1990, showing Koger assisting Garbo, who was walking with a cane, into the hospital.

Garbo died on Easter Sunday, 15 April 1990, aged 84, in the hospital, as a result of pneumonia and renal failure. Daum later claimed that towards the end, she also suffered from gastrointestinal and periodontal ailments.

Garbo was cremated and her ashes were interred nine years later in 1999 at Skogskyrkogården Cemetery just south of her native Stockholm.

Garbo made numerous investments, primarily in stocks and bonds, and left her entire estate of $32 million (equivalent to $79,000,000 in 2025) to her niece.

== Legacy ==
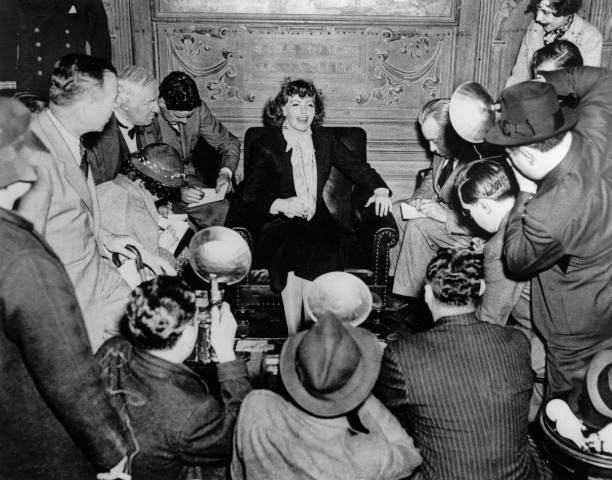
Garbo surrounded by journalists in 1935

Garbo was an international movie star during the late silent era and the "Golden Age" of Hollywood who became a screen icon.

For most of her career, Garbo was the highest-paid star at Metro-Goldwyn-Mayer, making her for many years the studio's "premier prestige star". After her death, the Los Angeles Times published an obituary calling her "the most alluring, vibrant and yet aloof character to grace the motion-picture screen." The April 1990 Washington Post obituary said that "at the peak of her popularity, she was a virtual cult figure."

Garbo possessed a subtlety and naturalism in her acting that set her apart from other actors and actresses of the period. About her work in silents, film critic Ty Burr said: "This was a new kind of actor—not the stage actor who had to play to the far seats, but someone who could just look and with her eyes literally go from rage to sorrow in just a close-up."

Film historian Jeffrey Vance said that Garbo communicated her characters' innermost feelings through her movement, gestures, and, most importantly, her eyes. With the slightest movement of them, he argues, she subtly conveyed complex attitudes and feelings toward other characters and the truth of the situation. "She doesn't act," said Camille co-star Rex O'Malley, "she lives her roles." Clarence Brown, who directed seven of Garbo's pictures, told an interviewer, "Garbo has something behind the eyes that you couldn't see until you photographed it in close-up. You could see thought. If she had to look at one person with jealousy, and another with love, she didn't have to change her expression. You could see it in her eyes as she looked from one to the other. And nobody else has been able to do that on screen." Director George Sidney adds: "You could call it underplaying, but in underplaying, she overplayed everyone else."

Film critic Richard Schickel wrote that "She was always a creature of withdrawal, of silence−thus, ideally, of the silents−an actress who from the first moment she appeared on the screen defined herself by her refusals. This was an inescapable condition for her, a point that is reenforced by all the biographical delvings into her childhood and adolescence that we have."

Many critics have said that few of Garbo's 24 Hollywood films are artistically exceptional, and that many are simply bad. It has been said, however, that her commanding and magnetic performances usually overcome the weaknesses of plot and dialogue. As one biographer put it, "All moviegoers demanded of a Garbo production was Greta Garbo."

Film historian Ephraim Katz: "Of all the stars who have ever fired the imaginations of audiences, none has quite projected a magnetism and a mystique equal to Garbo. 'The Divine', the 'dream princess of eternity', the 'Sarah Bernhardt of films', are only a few of the superlatives writers used in describing her over the years ... She played heroines that were at once sensual and pure, superficial and profound, suffering and hopeful, world-weary and life-inspiring."

American film actress Bette Davis: "Her instinct, her mastery over the machine, was pure witchcraft. I cannot analyze this woman's acting. I only know that no one else so effectively worked in front of a camera."

Mexican film actress Dolores del Río: "The most extraordinary woman (in art) that I have encountered in my life. It was as if she had diamonds in her bones and in her interior light struggled to come out through the pores of her skin."

American film director George Cukor: "She had a talent that few actresses or actors possess. In close-ups, she gave the impression, the illusion of great movement. She would move her head just a little bit, and the whole screen would come alive, like a strong breeze that made itself felt."

American film actor Gregory Peck: "If you ask me my favorite actress of all time, I will tell you that it is Greta Garbo. She shared her emotions with the camera and the audience. They were very truthful emotions. To my mind, she was an early practitioner of the Method. She felt everything she did and had the intelligence to go with it. ... And that is the key for the audience. If they believe it, then they've spent a couple of good hours at the cinema."

American film actress Kim Novak: "You know, my idol, I idolize Greta Garbo. I just loved her work so much. She was, again, so real. She was not -- to me, she wasn't stylized. You could see any of her work right now. She was just amazing, and what I loved about it also was there was an air of mystery about her work. There was always something more. She didn't give you everything. She held back, and I like that. I probably -- she was my role model."

=== Documentary portrayals ===
Garbo is the subject of several documentaries, including four made in the United States between 1990 and 2005, and one made for the BBC in 1969:

- Garbo (1969), BBC, written by Alexander Walker (critic), narrated by Joan Crawford
- The Divine Garbo (1990), TNT, produced by Ellen M. Krass and Susan F. Walker, narrated by Glenn Close
- Greta Garbo: The Mysterious Lady (1998), Biography Channel, narrated by Peter Graves
- Greta Garbo: A Lone Star (2001), AMC
- Garbo (2005), TCM, directed by Kevin Brownlow, narrated by Julie Christie
- Garbo: Where Did You Go? (2024), written by Lorna Tucker

=== In art and literature ===
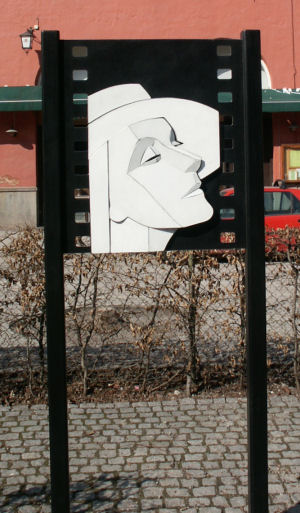
Greta Garbo Memorial by Tomas Qvarsebo in Stockholm

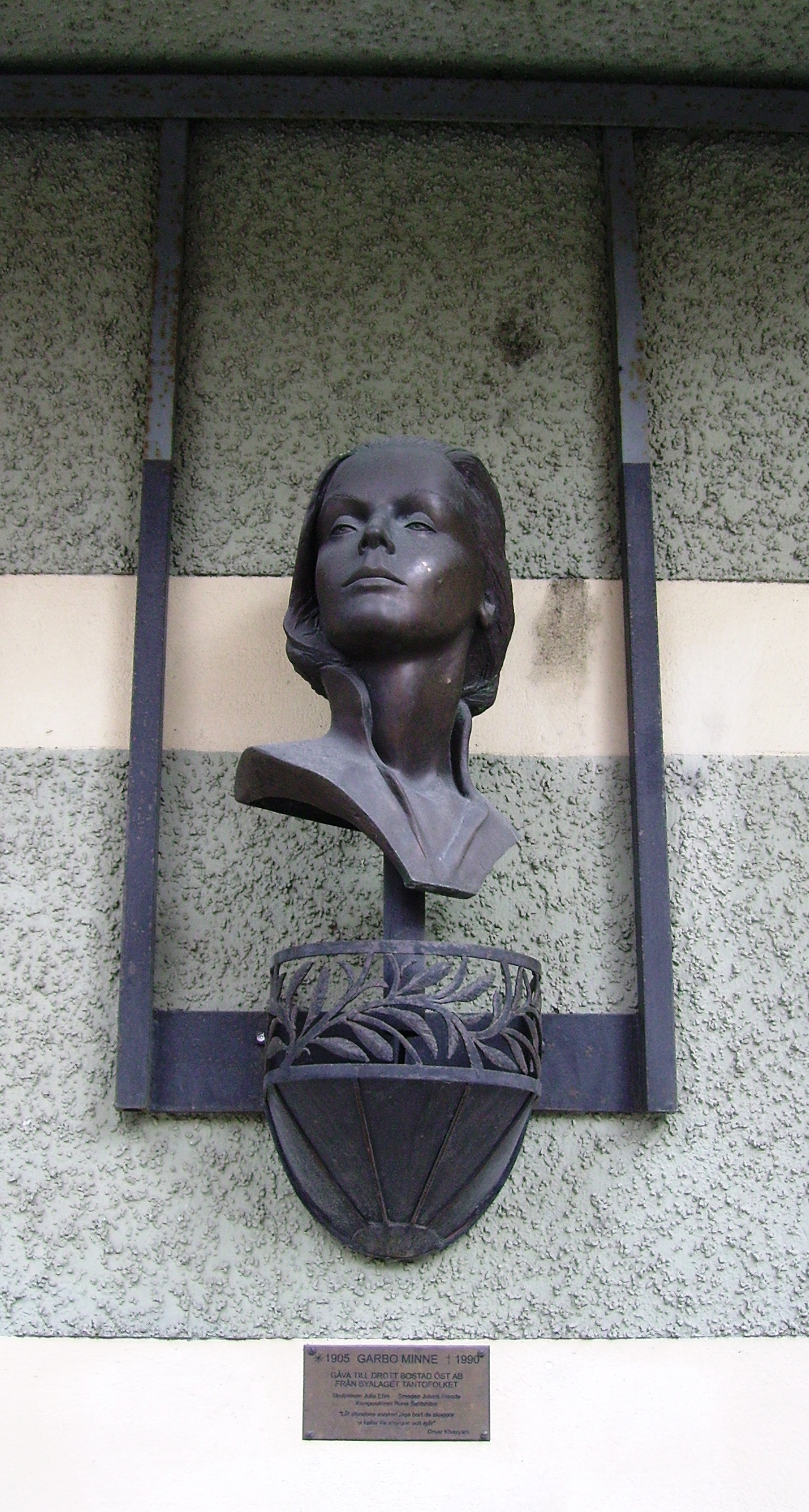
Sculpture of Garbo in Stockholm

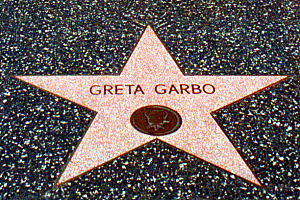
Garbo's star on the Hollywood Walk of Fame

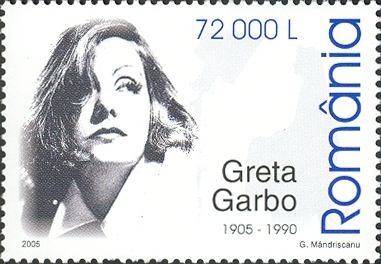
Garbo on a 2005 Romanian postal stamp

Garbo has been memorialized in art and literature both during and after her life. Garbo was one of the subjects of French composer Charles Koechlin's "Seven Stars Symphony" (1933), which consisted of seven movements, each dedicated to a Hollywood star.

Author Ernest Hemingway provided an imaginary portrayal of Garbo in his novel For Whom the Bell Tolls (1940): "Maybe it is like the dreams you have when someone you have seen in the cinema comes to your bed at night and is so kind and lovely ... He could remember Garbo still ... Maybe it was like those dreams the night before the attack on Pozoblanco, and [Garbo] was wearing a soft silky wool sweater when he put his arms around her, and when she leaned forward, and her hair swept forward and over his face, and she said why had he never told her that he loved her when she had loved him all this time? ... and it was as true as though it had happened ..."

Garbo was portrayed by Betty Comden in the film Garbo Talks (1984). The plot concerns a dying Garbo fan (Anne Bancroft) whose last wish is to meet her idol. Her son (played by Ron Silver) diligently searches for the elusive Garbo, determined to fulfill his mother's wish.

A statue of Greta Garbo titled "Statue of Integrity" by Jón Leifsson sits isolated deep in the forest in Härjedalen.

The Cole Porter song "You're the Top" makes a passing reference to the importance of her salary. Garbo is mentioned in The Kinks' 1972 song "Celluloid Heroes" and the 1977 song "Right Before Your Eyes" by Ian Thomas, which was covered by America in 1982. Greta Garbo is mentioned in the 1981 Kim Carnes hit song "Bette Davis Eyes" and she was the subject of the 1985 Freddie Mercury song, "Living On My Own". The 1988 song, "Garbo" by Austrian musician Falco serves as a tribute in the form of a love song. In the 1990 song "Vogue" by Madonna, Greta Garbo is the first mentioned of a list of stars from Hollywood's Golden Age. Greta Garbo is also the namesake of and mentioned in the song "Garbo" by Stevie Nicks.

In 2023, notable artist William Kentridge included a drawing of Garbo in his solo museum exhibition at The Broad in Los Angeles.

Pornographic film director Peter de Rome shot footage of Garbo walking across First Avenue that he inserted into his 1974 feature Adam & Yves. Its presence was explained by having one of the characters recalling how he once saw the elusive star. The Garbo footage was used without the star's knowledge or permission, and she was not paid for her appearance.

== Awards and honors ==
Garbo was nominated four times for the Academy Award for Best Actress. In 1930, a performer could receive a single nomination for their work in more than one film. Garbo received her nomination for her work in both Anna Christie and for Romance. She lost out to Irving Thalberg's wife, Norma Shearer, who won for The Divorcee. In 1937, Garbo was nominated for Camille, but Luise Rainer won for The Good Earth. Finally, in 1939, Garbo was nominated for Ninotchka, but again came away empty-handed. Gone With the Wind swept the major awards, including Best Actress, which went to Vivien Leigh. In 1954, however, she was awarded an Academy Honorary Award "for her luminous and unforgettable screen performances". Predictably, Garbo did not show up at the ceremony, and the statuette was mailed to her home address.

Garbo twice received the New York Film Critics Circle Award for Best Actress: for Anna Karenina in 1935, and for Camille in 1936. She won the National Board of Review Best Acting Award for Camille in 1936; for Ninotchka in 1939; and for Two-Faced Woman in 1941. The Swedish royal medal Litteris et Artibus, which is awarded to people who have made important contributions to culture (especially music, dramatic art, or literature) was presented to Garbo in January 1937. In a 1950 Daily Variety opinion poll, Garbo was voted "Best Actress of the Half Century", In 1957, she was awarded The George Eastman Award, given by George Eastman House for distinguished contribution to the art of film.

In November 1983, she received the Commander, 1st Class, of the Swedish Order of the Polar Star from King Carl XVI Gustaf, the King of Sweden. In 1985, she was awarded the Illis quorum by the government of Sweden. In 1985, a star was nicknamed after her. For her contributions to cinema, in 1960, she was honored with a star on the Hollywood Walk of Fame at 6901 Hollywood Boulevard.

Year	Organization	Category	Work	Result	Ref.
1930	Academy Awards	Best Actress	Anna Christie, Romance	Nominated	
1935	New York Film Critics Circle	Best Actress	Anna Karenina	Won	
1937	New York Film Critics Circle	Best Actress	Camille	Won	
1937	Litteris et Artibus	—N/a	—N/a	Won	
1937	National Board of Review	Best Actress	Camille	Won	
1938	Academy Awards	Best Actress	Camille	Nominated	
1939	National Board of Review	Best Actress	Ninotchka	Won	
1939	New York Film Critics Circle	Best Actress	Ninotchka	Nominated	
1940	Academy Awards	Best Actress	Ninotchka	Nominated	
1941	National Board of Review	Best Actress	Two-Faced Woman	Nominated	
1941	New York Film Critics Circle	Best Actress	Two-Faced Woman	3rd place	
1950	Daily Variety	Best Actress of the Half Century	—N/a	Voted	
1954	Academy Awards	Academy Honorary Award	—N/a	Honored	
1957	George Eastman House	George Eastman Award	—N/a	Won	
1960	Hollywood Walk of Fame	Star - Motion Pictures	—N/a	Honored	
1983	King Carl XVI Gustaf	Commander, 1st Class, of the Swedish Order of the Polar Star	—N/a	Honored	
1985	Government of Sweden	Illis quorum	—N/a	Won	

Garbo appears on a number of postage stamps, and in September 2005, the United States Postal Service and Swedish Posten jointly issued two commemorative stamps bearing her image. On 6 April 2011, Sveriges Riksbank announced that Garbo's portrait was to be featured on the 100-krona banknote, beginning in 2014–2015.

== Filmography ==
Silent films
Year	Title	Role	Notes
1920	Mr. and Mrs. Stockholm Go Shopping	Elder sister	An advertisement. Garbo's segment is often known as How Not to Dress.
1921	A Fortune Hunter	Extra	Uncredited; lost film
1921	Our Daily Bread	Companion	An advertising film
1922	Peter the Tramp	Greta	Garbo's first part in a commercial film
1924	The Saga of Gosta Berling	Elizabeth Dohna	Garbo's first leading part in a feature-length film; Swedish, dir. Mauritz Stiller.
1925	Joyless Street	Greta Rumfort	German film directed by G. W. Pabst
1926	Torrent	Leonora Moreno aka La Brunna	Garbo's first American film. All of Garbo's subsequent movies were made in Hollywood and produced by Metro-Goldwyn-Mayer.
1926	The Temptress	Elena	
1926	Flesh and the Devil	Felicitas	The first of seven Garbo films directed by Clarence Brown, and first of four movies with co-star John Gilbert
1927	Love	Anna Karenina	Adapted from the novel Anna Karenina by Tolstoy
1928	The Divine Woman	Marianne	The film is lost; only a 9-minute reel exists.
1928	The Mysterious Lady	Tania Fedorova	
1928	A Woman of Affairs	Diana Merrick Furness	The first of seven Garbo films with actor Lewis Stone, who, with the exception of Wild Orchids, played secondary roles.
1929	Wild Orchids	Lillie Sterling	
1929	A Man's Man	Herself	Garbo and John Gilbert make cameo appearances; this film is lost.
1929	The Single Standard	Arden Stuart Hewlett	
1929	The Kiss	Irene Guarry	Garbo's, and MGM's, last silent picture

Sound films
Year	Title	Role	Notes
1930	Anna Christie	Anna Christie	Nominated – Academy Award for Best Actress
1930	Romance	Madame Rita Cavallini	Nominated – Academy Award for Best Actress
1930	Anna Christie	Anna Christie	MGM's German version of Anna Christie was also released in 1930
1931	Inspiration	Yvonne Valbret	
1931	Susan Lenox (Her Fall and Rise)	Susan Lenox	
1931	Mata Hari	Mata Hari	After the multi-star Grand Hotel, Garbo's highest-grossing film
1932	Grand Hotel	Grusinskaya	Academy Award for Best Picture
1932	As You Desire Me	Zara aka Marie	The first of three Garbo films with co-star Melvyn Douglas
1933	Queen Christina	Queen Christina	
1934	The Painted Veil	Katrin Koerber Fane	
1935	Anna Karenina	Anna Karenina	New York Film Critics Circle Award for Best Actress
1936	Camille	Marguerite Gautier	New York Film Critics Circle Award for Best Actress; National Board of Review Best Acting Award; Nominated – Academy Award for Best Actress
1937	Conquest	Countess Marie Walewska	
1939	Ninotchka	Nina Ivanovna "Ninotchka" Yakushova	National Board of Review Best Acting Award; Nominated – Academy Award for Best Actress; Nominated – New York Film Critics Circle Award for Best Actress
1941	Two-Faced Woman	Karin Borg Blake / Katherine Borg	National Board of Review of Motion Pictures Best Acting Award

=== Box-office ranking ===
- 1929 – 17th
- 1930 – 6th
- 1931 – 10th
- 1932 – 5th

== See also ==
- Cultural depictions of Greta Garbo
- Images of Greta Garbo
- List of actors with two or more Academy Award nominations in acting categories
- List of Academy Award records – first Nordic to be nominated for acting, in Anna Christie (1930)
