= Salka Viertel =

Austrian-American actress and screenwriter (1899–1978)

- Born: Salomea Sara Steuermann; June 15, 1889; Sambor, Austro-Hungarian Empire
- Died: October 20, 1978 (aged 89); Klosters, Switzerland
- Occupations: Actress, screenwriter
- Years active: 1929–1959
- Spouse: Berthold Viertel (m. 1918; div. 1947)
- Children: 3, including Peter Viertel
- Parents: Joseph Steuermann (father); Auguste Amster (mother)

Salka Viertel (June 15, 1889 – October 20, 1978) was an Austrian actress and Hollywood screenwriter. While under contract with Metro-Goldwyn-Mayer from 1933 to 1937, Viertel co-wrote the scripts for many movies, particularly those starring her close friend Greta Garbo, including Queen Christina (1933) and Anna Karenina (1935). She also played opposite Garbo in MGM's German-language version of Anna Christie (1930). Viertel was known as the "social connector" within the large European émigré community of artists who settled on the West Side of Los Angeles in the 1930s and '40s.

== Early life and career ==
Viertel was born Salomea Sara Steuermann in Sambor, a city then in the province of Galicia, which was a part of the Austro-Hungarian Empire, but today is in western Ukraine. Her father, Joseph Steuermann, was a lawyer and the first Jewish mayor of Sambor before antisemitism forced him to renounce his office. Her mother, Auguste (née Amster) Steuermann, taught the importance of hospitality, which Salka adopted during her years in exile in Santa Monica, California. Her siblings were Eduard, a composer and pianist; Zygmunt, a Polish national football player who perished in the Holocaust; and Rosa (1891–1972), married from 1922 until her death to the actor and director Josef Gielen.

=== Stage career ===
After debuting as Salome Steuermann at the Pressburg Stadttheater (regional theater), Salka earned starring roles in Germany and Austria before and during World War I. In 1911, she acted briefly under the direction of Max Reinhardt in Berlin. Following that, she accepted an offer in 1913 to go to Vienna and work in the Neue Wiener Bühne theater. There she met her husband, author and director Berthold Viertel, and they married in 1918. They raised three sons—Hans, Peter, and Thomas—before divorcing in 1947. In 1920, Salka went to the Hamburg theater where she got the part of Medea in the Greek tragedy. Her husband meanwhile was in Berlin much of the time, working for UFA, the major German film production company. He also co-founded the collective theater Die Truppe. The Viertels then moved to Düsseldorf when Berthold was appointed director of the city's renowned theater.

In 1928, at F.W. Murnau's instigation, the Viertel family emigrated to Hollywood when Berthold received a contract with Fox Film Corporation as a director and writer. Even though they left before the Nazis came to power, the Viertels were often linked with "Hitler's gift to America". That's how one biographer characterized the many artists throughout Europe who fled the continent seeking safe haven from political turmoil. Historian Thomas Saunders notes that, as with U.S. universities in the 1930s, the Hollywood studios could be very selective because "the list of émigrés reads almost as a who's who of Weimar production." Saunders ranks Berthold Viertel as "only marginally less significant" than other émigrés whom he considers "without peer."

=== Film career ===
Despite her stage successes in Germany and Austria, Salka struggled to obtain a foothold as a film actor. She agreed with Max Reinhardt (whom the Viertels encountered in New York on their way to Los Angeles) that she was "neither beautiful nor young enough" for a career in movies, which she was attempting to begin at age forty. One of her few prominent roles was as the prostitute Marthy in the German-language version of Anna Christie, which she took at the request of Greta Garbo. (Marie Dressler had played Marthy in the English-language version of the film.)

Salka Viertel first met Garbo in 1929 at a party at Ernst Lubitsch's home, and the two women became instant friends. Over the next couple of decades, Viertel was a mentor and confidante to the famous Swedish actress. It was Garbo who encouraged Viertel to write screenplays as an alternative to film acting. Although Viertel was hesitant at first, she went on to co-write scripts for several Garbo films such as Queen Christina (1933), The Painted Veil (1934), and Anna Karenina (1935). It was said, "the path to a Hollywood production with Garbo was through collaboration with Salka Viertel." But despite numerous attempts in the 1940s, Viertel was unable to develop an acceptable film project for Garbo, who remained in retirement. Likewise, Viertel's plans to co-author a "commercial" script with her fellow exile Bertolt Brecht never materialized.

== Social activism ==
The Viertels, members of the intelligentsia in Europe, moved to the United States in 1928 for a planned four-year period. They initially lived on Fairfax Avenue in Los Angeles, before renting a house at 165 Mabery Road in Santa Monica, California. In 1932, during Hitler's ascendancy, they decided to stay in Santa Monica, where their sons grew up.

The Viertel home became the site of salons and meetings of the émigré community of European intellectuals along with Hollywood luminaries, particularly at Sunday tea parties that Salka hosted. Her assortment of regular guests included not only Sergei Eisenstein, Charlie Chaplin, Jean Renoir, Christopher Isherwood (who moved into Viertel's garage apartment with his boyfriend in 1946), Hanns Eisler, Bertolt Brecht, Max Reinhardt, Bruno Walter, Lion Feuchtwanger, Franz Werfel, and Thomas Mann, but could range all the way from Arnold Schoenberg to Ava Gardner. Professor Ehrhard Bahr dubbed this cultural sanctuary of distinguished artists and intellectuals, many of them from German-speaking countries, "Weimar on the Pacific".

Besides acting as a diplomat within the ethnically and politically diverse expatriate colony, Viertel also played a practical role as a go-between who could accelerate projects and careers. She actively fundraised for Eisenstein's Que Viva Mexico! project. Composer Franz Waxman met director James Whale through her and wrote his first Hollywood soundtrack for Whale. Brecht was introduced to Charles Laughton at her house, and that was the genesis of their collaboration on the English-language version of Life of Galileo. Charles Boyer was among the European actors whom she helped get started in the American film industry.

In the fight against Nazism, Viertel came to the aid of those trapped in Europe, in part by serving as a founding member of the European Film Fund, which brokered contracts with Hollywood studios. Through the Fund's assistance, notable artists such as Leonhard Frank, Heinrich Mann, Alfred Polgar, Walter Mehring, and Friedrich Torberg received emergency visas that enabled them to escape the Nazis. Viertel also helped émigrés "find their footing when they arrived." New Yorker music critic Alex Ross speculated that "Weimar on the Pacific might never have existed without her."

== Later life ==
Following her divorce from Berthold in December 1947, Viertel continued to live on Mabery Road. Her ailing mother Auguste was staying with her. With the onset of the Cold War and McCarthy era, Viertel was one of the Hollywood screenwriters suspected of being a Communist or "fellow traveler" and was blacklisted from employment. To earn money, she gave drama lessons, managed to sell a couple of teleplays, and vied for various poorly paid film script assignments.

In January 1953, Auguste died. In that same year, Viertel learned that her ex-husband was gravely ill in Austria. She wanted to see him one last time, but in August 1953 the U.S. State Department denied her passport application due to her having been "closely associated with known Communists." As a consequence, she was unable to travel to Europe to visit Berthold before his death in September.

In early December 1953, the State Department summoned Viertel to Washington, D.C. to discuss her political associations. At the hearing, she sufficiently cleared herself to be granted a restricted passport, valid for four months. She immediately made plans to flee the country. She booked an airplane ticket for Ireland on December 26, with the intention to settle in Klosters, Switzerland near family members. As Viertel later recalled, she was alone on Christmas Eve, packing for her departure, when she heard a knock at the door:

It was Greta [Garbo]; she also was alone. I quickly improvised a supper and lit the candles on a tiny Christmas tree. It had been a bitter year, but its days were numbered. I poured Vodka into our glasses and we said "skol" to each other.

In 1960, her son Peter married his second wife, actress Deborah Kerr, and they lived part of the year in Klosters. Salka Viertel's well-received memoir, The Kindness of Strangers, was published in 1969 (it was reissued in 2019). During her last years, she suffered from Parkinson's disease. After a two-year bout with cancer, she died in Klosters on October 20, 1978, aged 89.

== Selected filmography ==
Actress

- Seven Faces (1929) as Catherine the Great
- Anna Christie (1930, German-language version) as Marthy Owens
- The Mask Falls (1931)
- The Sacred Flame (1931)

Screenwriter

- Queen Christina (1933)
- The Painted Veil (1934)
- Anna Karenina (1935)
- Conquest (1937)
- Two-Faced Woman (1941)
- Deep Valley (1947)
- The River (1951) - uncredited
- Loves of Three Queens (1954)
- Prisoner of the Volga (1958)

Commentator

- My Name Is Bertolt Brecht - Exile in U.S.A. (1988) - this documentary film includes clips of Viertel discussing her friendship with Brecht during the 1940s when he lived near her in Santa Monica and was attempting to break into Hollywood screenwriting.

== Bibliography ==
- Bebermeier, Carola (June 21, 2021). "'Sundays at Salka's' – Salka Viertel's Los Angeles Salon as a Space of (Music-)Cultural Translation". Musicologica Austriaca: Journal for Austrian Music Studies (MusAu).
- Nottelmann, Nicole. (2011) Ich liebe dich. Fur immer: Greta Garbo und Salka Viertel (in German). Berlin: Aufbau Verlag.
- Prager, Katharina. (2007) "Ich bin nicht gone Hollywood!" Salka Viertel – Ein Leben in Theater und Film (in German), ISBN 978-3700315926, Wien: Braumüller Verlag.
- Rifkind, Donna (2020). The Sun and Her Stars: Salka Viertel and Hitler's Exiles in the Golden Age of Hollywood. New York: Other Press. ISBN 9781590517215. OCLC 1255775938.
- SateLIT 2: Salka Viertel. Berlin - Hollywood (2021). Exhibition Stiftung Brandenburger Tor im Max Liebermann Haus, Berlin. September 8 to November 21, 2021.
- Viertel, Salka (1969). The Kindness of Strangers (1st ed.). New York: Holt, Rinehart and Winston. ISBN 003076470X.
