= The Single Standard =

1929 film

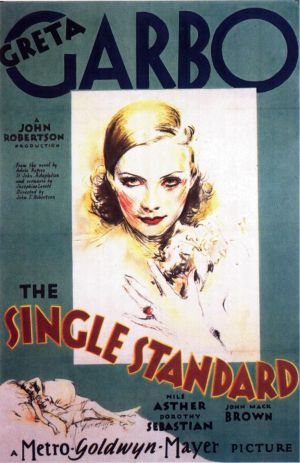
- Directed by: John S. Robertson
- Written by: Josephine Lovett; Marian Ainslee (intertitles)
- Based on: The Single Standard; 1928 novel by Adela Rogers St. Johns
- Starring: Greta Garbo; Nils Asther; Johnny Mack Brown
- Cinematography: Oliver T. Marsh
- Edited by: Blanche Sewell
- Music by: William Axt
- Distributed by: Metro-Goldwyn-Mayer
- Release date: July 27, 1929
- Running time: 73 minutes
- Country: United States
- Languages: Sound (Synchronized); English intertitles
- Budget: US$ 336,000
- Box office: US$ 1,048,000

The Single Standard is a 1929 American synchronized sound romantic drama film from Metro-Goldwyn-Mayer directed by veteran John S. Robertson and starring Greta Garbo, Nils Asther. and Johnny Mack Brown. The film has no audible dialogue but featured a synchronized musical score and sound effects. The soundtrack was recorded using the Western Electric Sound System sound-on-film process. The soundtrack was also transferred to discs for those theatres that were wired with sound-on-disc sound systems.

This was Greta Garbo's fifteenth film and her second collaboration with fellow Swedish actor Nils Asther, after Wild Orchids.

== Plot ==
The Single Standard (1929)

Debutante Arden Stuart, believes a single standard of conduct should apply to both sexes, one that strives for a combination of freedom, equality, and honesty — in regards to love. Her first attempt is with chauffeur Anthony Kendall, who is secretly a disillusioned "ace aviator" and son of a lord. However their joyous romance ends in disaster, when the young ace commits suicide after being fired because of their illicit affair.

Her longtime admirer Tommy Hewlett wants to marry her, but Arden finds fulfillment after a chance encounter with Packy Cannon, a wealthy ex-prizefighter turned painter. He had planned a solo cruise to the South Seas on his yacht, but impulsive Arden sails along with him. After months of idyllic bliss however, he turns around and takes her home, explaining that he needs his full attention for his painting.

Though Tommy knows of Arden's love for Packy, he begs her to marry him anyway. She agrees. Several years go by, and they have a much-beloved son.

However, Packy returns and admits to Arden that he could not stop thinking about her. She is swept away and agrees to sail away with him once again. Tommy confronts his rival at gunpoint, ordering Packy to pretend to reject Arden. In return for the bargain, Tommy promises to arrange a hunting "accident" for himself, so that Arden can be with Packy without starting a scandal, which would hurt his son. Meanwhile, Arden comes to realize that their child means more to her than anything else. She tells Packy she cannot go with him. Tommy, completely unaware of this, still plans to carry out his shooting "accident." Fortunately, Arden intuitively figures out Tommy's fateful plan in time. Suddenly, Tommy gazes out the window, noticing Packy's yacht is sailing away in the harbor, with his family safe at home.

== Cast ==
- Greta Garbo as Arden Stuart Hewlett
- Nils Asther as Packy Cannon
- Johnny Mack Brown as Tommy Hewlett (as John Mack Brown)
- Dorothy Sebastian as Mercedes Stuart
- Lane Chandler as Ding Stuart
- Mahlon Hamilton as Mr. John Glendenning
- Kathlyn Williams as Mrs. Glendenning
- Zeffie Tilbury as Mrs. Handley
- Wally Albright as Arden's young son (uncredited)
- Joel McCrea as Blythe (uncredited)
- Robert Montgomery as Party Guest (uncredited)

== Music ==
The film features a theme song entitled "Forever With You" which was composed by Louis Alter.

== Production ==
Production took place in April and May 1929, in Hollywood, California. Production stills photographs were made by James Manatt and production portraits were taken by Ruth Harriet Louise in May 1929.

This is often referred to as a "silent film", but it is not. Garbo's last three "silent" films, Wild Orchids, The Single Standard, and The Kiss were all non-talking "sound" films with orchestral scores and sound effects, with all dialogue conveyed through intertitle cards per the traditional "silent" method.

== Reception ==
=== Critical reception ===
Hal Erickson in All Movie Guide stated:

"Beautifully photographed in the MGM manner by Oliver Marsh, The Single Standard is a prime example of how to tell an essentially "talkie" story within the confines of the silent film."

=== Box office ===
The film garnered receipts of $1,048,000 ($659,000 in the US and $389,000 abroad), vs. a budget of $336,000. It was one of the top-grossing films of the year. The film brought MGM a profit of $333,000.

== Censorship ==
When The Single Standard was released in the United States, many states and cities in the United States had censor boards that could require cuts or other eliminations before the film could be shown. After the Chicago Board of Censors passed the film as "adults only", it was a box office sensation with one theater taking in $71,200 in the first week.

== Home media ==
The film was released on VHS home video in the 1980s (within Garbo's lifetime) with its original Movietone soundtrack and effects and appears on television with the Movietone. In 2009, The Single Standard was issued on DVD release for the first time.

== See also ==
- List of early sound feature films (1926–1929)
