= Marian Ainslee =

American screenwriter

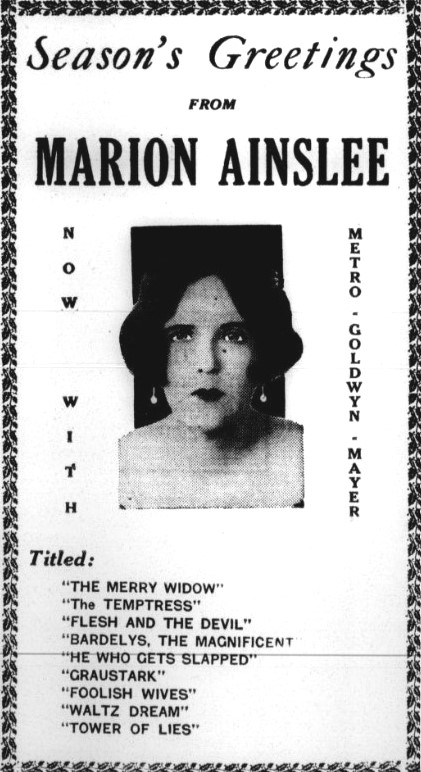
- 1926 seasons greetings
- Born: January 5, 1896; Marceline, Missouri, USA
- Died: April 2, 1966 (aged 70); Los Angeles, California, USA
- Spouse: Albert Coonley

Marian Ainslee (1896 – 1966) was an American screenwriter and researcher active during Hollywood's silent film era. She often co-wrote titles for silent films with Ruth Cummings.

== Biography ==
Marian Ainslee was born in Marceline, Missouri. Her first job out of school was as a newspaper reporter in Jefferson City, Missouri, where she interviewed politicians. Discouraged by salaries she encountered in journalism, she moved to Hollywood to try screenwriting. After getting her start as a script clerk, Ainslee became one of MGM's top title writers during the 1920s and early 1930s, linked closely to producer Irving Thalberg. When Thalberg died, she briefly retired from screenwriting, anad in 1938, she signed with RKO and wrote Carefree. According to one estimation, she titled up to 200 films in total.

She was married to newspaper artist Albert Coonley. They appear to have been divorced by the time of his death in 1941.

== Selected filmography ==
- The Duke of Chimney Butte (1921)
- Foolish Wives (1922)
- A Lady of Quality (1924)
- He Who Gets Slapped (1924)
- Secrets of the Night (1924)
- The Merry Widow (1925)
- Graustark (1925)
- The Tower of Lies (1925)
- Bardelys the Magnificent (1926)
- The Temptress (1926)
- Flesh and the Devil (1926)
- Winners of the Wilderness (1927)
- Lovers? (1927)
- California (1927)
- Annie Laurie (1927)
- Foreign Devils (1927)
- Quality Street (1927)
- In Old Kentucky (1927)
- Love (1927)
- The Mysterious Lady (1928)
- Our Dancing Daughters (1928)
- The Masks of the Devil (1928)
- Dream of Love (1928)
- A Woman of Affairs (1928)
- Wild Orchids (1929)
- Desert Nights (1929)
- The Bridge of San Luis Rey (1929)
- Wonder of Woman (1929)
- The Single Standard (1929)
- Hallelujah (1929)
- Our Modern Maidens (1929)
- The Kiss (1929)
- Queen Kelly (1932)
- What Every Woman Knows (1934)
- Carefree (1938)
