= Desert Nights =

1929 film

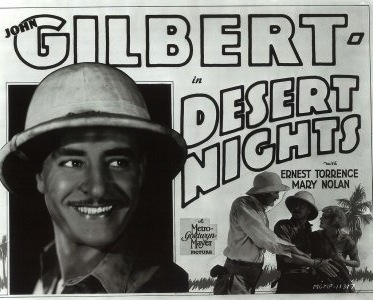
- Directed by: William Nigh
- Written by: Willis Goldbeck (treatment); Endre Bohem (adaptation); Marian Ainslee (titles); Ruth Cummings (titles); Lenore J. Coffee (continuity)
- Story by: John T. Neville; Dale Van Every
- Produced by: William Nigh
- Starring: John Gilbert; Ernest Torrence; Mary Nolan
- Cinematography: James Wong Howe
- Edited by: Harry Reynolds
- Music by: William Axt (uncredited)
- Distributed by: Metro-Goldwyn-Mayer
- Release date: March 29, 1929 (United States)
- Running time: 62 minutes
- Country: United States
- Languages: Sound (Synchronized); English intertitles

Desert Nights (also known as Thirst) is a 1929 American synchronized sound adventure/romantic drama film starring John Gilbert, Ernest Torrence, and Mary Nolan. While the film has no audible dialog, it was released with a synchronized musical score with sound effects using both the sound-on-disc and sound-on-film process. Directed by William Nigh, the film was the last film without audible dialogue featuring John Gilbert.

== Plot ==
A gang of thieves rob an African diamond company of diamonds worth $500,000, with two of its members posing as Lord and Lady Stonehill (who are expected to pay a visit). They kidnap its manager, Hugh Rand, and head into the "Calahari" Desert. After a few days in the sweltering heat, three of the crooks decide to take their chances in Cape Town instead and demand their share of the loot. Steve ("Lord Stonehill") gives them worthless glass.

He and Diana ("Lady Stonehill") keep going, taking Hugh with them. When their native porters desert, however, the thieves are forced to rely on Hugh to guide them. He gains the upper hand as they trek through the hostile desert with very little water. Later, one of the other crooks returns and tells them that the other two died from drinking from a poisoned waterhole, before succumbing himself. Steve reveals he poisoned the water to deter pursuit. Hugh keeps tensions high by romancing Diana, infuriating Steve. As they get thirstier and thirstier, a parched Diana offers Hugh first the diamonds, then herself, in exchange for some of the water. When he rejects both, she even offers to be his slave, but with the same result. Eventually, they reach a safe waterhole.

However, Hugh has been leading them in a circle, and they finally end up back at the diamond company office. Steve is first introduced to the real Lord and Lady Stonehill, before being taken away. Diana's fate is left in Hugh's hands. He tells her she is free, except that she will have to report to him every day for the rest of her life. Then he embraces her.

== Cast ==
- John Gilbert as Hugh Rand
- Ernest Torrence as Steve/Lord Stonehill
- Mary Nolan as Lady Diana Stonehill
- Claude King as the real Lord Stonehill (uncredited)

== Reception ==
Mordaunt Hall, critic for The New York Times, gave the film a favorable review, writing that "incredible though this adventure may be, it happens to be one that holds the interest." Nolan "gives a good performance", Gilbert "gives an earnest showing as Rand" and "Mr. Torrance is capital as Steve."

== Status ==
Desert Nights survives and is available for download or DVD purchase from The Warner Bros. Archives collection site.

== See also ==
- List of early sound feature films (1926–1929)
