= Ruth Cummings =

American screenwriter

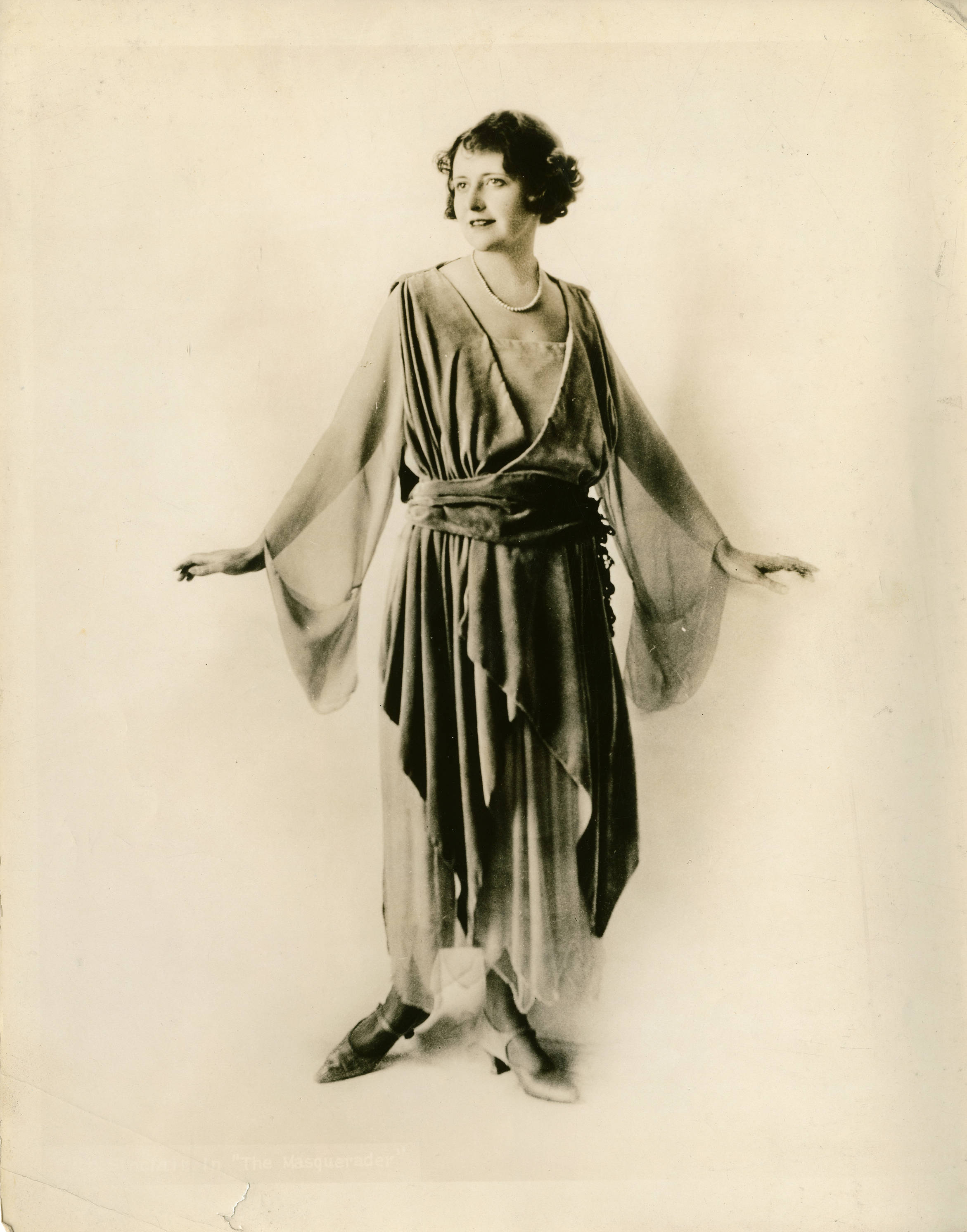
- Ruth Cummings in 1922
- Born: Ruth D. Sinclair; April 4, 1894; Washington, D.C., US
- Died: December 6, 1984 (aged 90); Los Angeles, California, US
- Occupations: Screenwriter, actress
- Spouse: Irving Cummings (m. 1917; died 1959)
- Children: Irving Cummings Jr.

Ruth Cummings (originally credited under her maiden name, Ruth Sinclair) was an American screenwriter and actress active from the 1910s through the 1930s. She was married to actor-director Irving Cummings in 1917, and they had a son, screenwriter Irving Cummings Jr.

== Biography ==
Cummings was born in Washington, D.C., to actor Henry Dupree Sinclair and his wife, Lillie Schreiner. She followed in her father's footsteps and took to the stage, performing in plays around the D.C. area and eventually winning parts on Broadway.

She eventually began appearing in silent films in the 1910s, rising to leading lady status by the 1920s when she won the lead role in 1922's The Masquerader. After marrying Irving Cummings (who she had worked with on films like 1917's A Man's Law), she became Ruth Cummings and began writing titles at MGM.

She worked at MGM for many years, and she once told a reporter that she got most of her ideas while drinking chocolate sodas. She appears to have retired after 1935's The Perfect Tribute.

She remained married to Cummings until his death in 1959, and she died on December 6, 1984, in the city of Los Angeles, California, in the neighborhood of Woodland Hills.

== Selected filmography ==
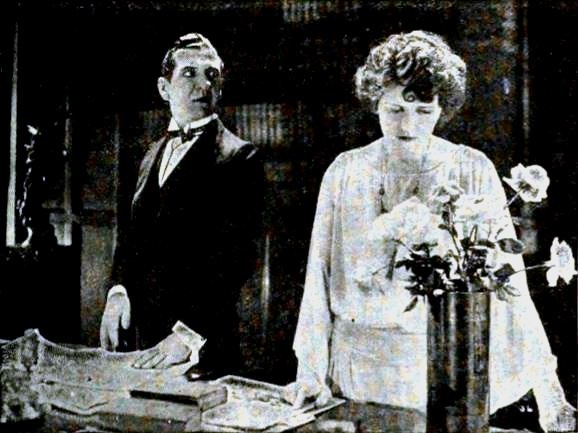
Post and Cummings in The Masquerader

As writer:

- The Perfect Tribute (1935)
- By Candlelight (1933)
- Never the Twain Shall Meet (1931)
- Daybreak (1931)
- Redemption (1930)
- Our Modern Maidens (1929)
- The Bridge of San Luis Rey (1929)
- Desert Nights (1929)
- Wild Orchids (1929)
- A Woman of Affairs (1928)
- Dream of Love (1928)
- The Masks of the Devil (1928)
- Beyond the Sierras (1928)
- Our Dancing Daughters (1928)
- The Mysterious Lady (1928)
- The Adventurer (1928)
- A Certain Young Man (1928)
- Wyoming (1928)
- Love (1927)
- In Old Kentucky (1927)
- Quality Street (1927)
- The Student Prince in Old Heidelberg (1927)
- Foreign Devils (1927)
- Annie Laurie (1927)
- California (1927)
- Lovers? (1927)
- Altars of Desire (1927)
- La Bohème (1926)
- The Tower of Lies (1925)

As actress:

- Dangerous Pastime (1922)
- The Masquerader (1922)
- Without Benefit of Clergy (1921)
- The Heart Line (1921)
- Some Bride (1919)
- A Man's Law (1919)
- The Girl with the Green Eyes (1916)
- Zaza (1915)
