= The Masks of the Devil =

1928 film

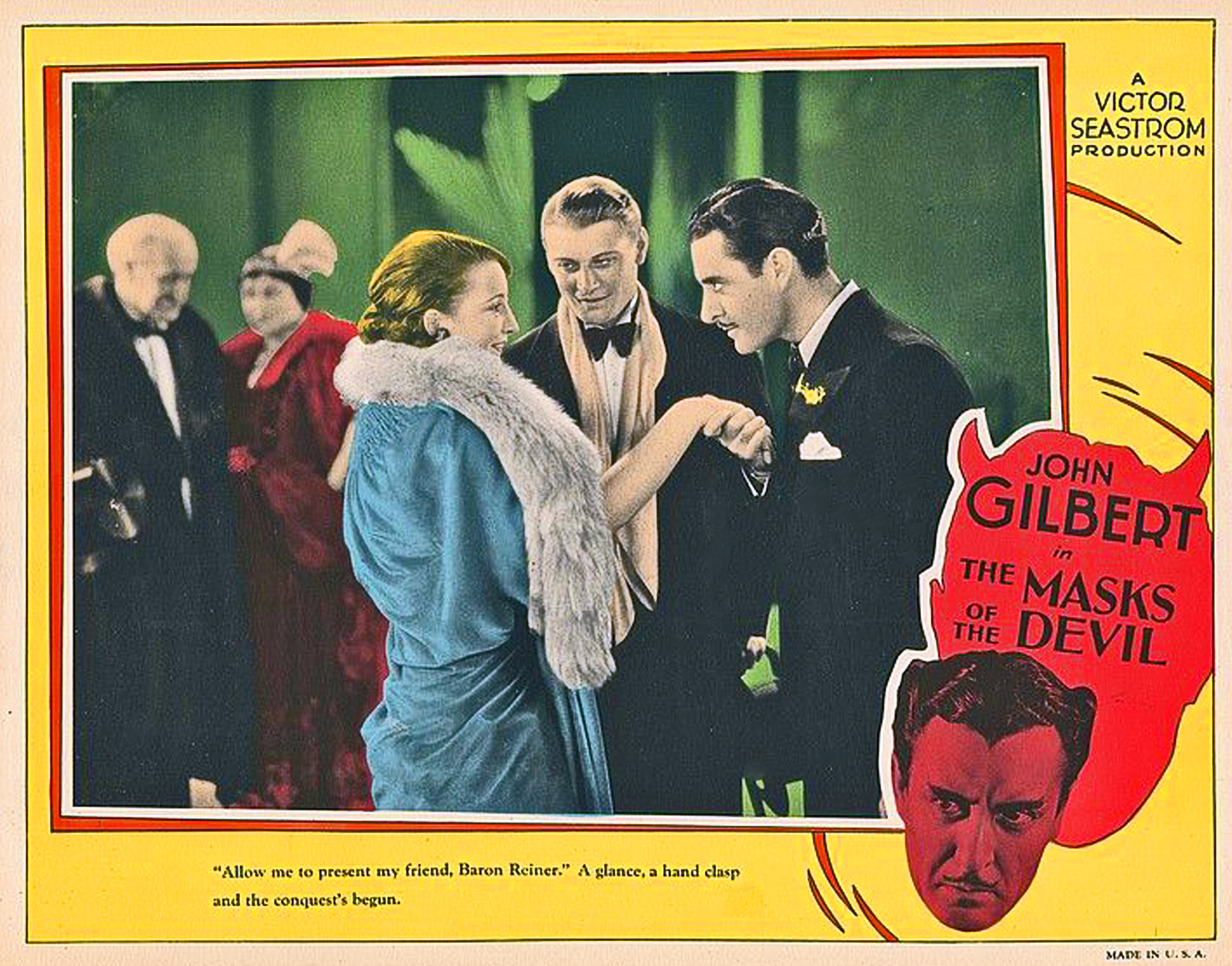
- Directed by: Victor Sjöström
- Written by: Marian Ainslee; Ruth Cummings; Svend Gade; Frances Marion
- Based on: Die Masken Erwin Reiners by Jakob Wassermann
- Starring: John Gilbert; Alma Rubens; Theodore Roberts; Frank Reicher; Eva von Berne
- Cinematography: Oliver T. Marsh
- Edited by: Conrad A. Nervig
- Music by: William Axt
- Production company: Metro-Goldwyn-Mayer
- Distributed by: Metro-Goldwyn-Mayer
- Release date: November 17, 1928
- Running time: 80 minutes
- Country: United States
- Languages: Sound (Synchronized); English Intertitles

The Masks of the Devil is a lost 1928 American drama synchronized sound film directed by Victor Sjöström and written by Marian Ainslee, Ruth Cummings, Svend Gade, and Frances Marion. While the film has no audible dialog, it was released with a synchronized musical score with sound effects using both the sound-on-disc and sound-on-film process. The film stars John Gilbert, Alma Rubens, Theodore Roberts, Frank Reicher, and Eva von Berne. The film was released on November 17, 1928, by Metro-Goldwyn-Mayer.

== Plot ==
In turn-of-the-century Vienna, Baron Erwin Reiner is celebrated for his charm, beauty, and easy sophistication. He is a man without a conscience, known for his indulgent lifestyle and his talent for seduction. At the start of the story, he is involved with Countess Helene Zellner, a passionate woman of society who adores him. But when Reiner meets Virginia, a quiet, innocent schoolgirl, he becomes immediately captivated. Virginia is engaged to Manfred, Reiner's closest friend—a man of integrity and idealism.

Wanting Virginia for himself, Reiner concocts a plan. He finances a prestigious scientific expedition for Manfred, who gratefully accepts the offer, unaware of Reiner's motives. After Manfred departs, Reiner ensures that none of Manfred's letters reach Virginia, keeping her isolated. He then begins to insert himself into her life, charming her family and presenting himself as a gentleman protector, while slowly eroding her trust in her absent fiancé.

In the background, Countess Helene grows increasingly jealous. Sensing Reiner's fixation on Virginia, she confronts him at a party he throws in the girl's honor. She threatens to kill herself unless he returns to her. Reiner, cold and dismissive, rejects her pleas. In a moment of desperation and heartbreak, Helene throws herself in front of a speeding automobile. She survives, but the crash leaves her physically and emotionally shattered, her mental state beginning to unravel.

Meanwhile, Count Zellner, Helene's husband, learns of her affair with Reiner. A confrontation ensues—one fraught with pride, betrayal, and fury. During the explosive quarrel, Count Zellner is shot and killed. His death further deepens the wreckage left in Reiner's wake.

Despite this, Reiner continues his pursuit of Virginia. He visits her at home while she is alone. But just as he is about to impose himself on her, a startling moment halts him: Reiner sees his reflection in a mirror. Instead of the elegant baron he imagines himself to be, he sees the face of a devil—the face of a man corrupted by lust, deception, and ruin. This moment of self-recognition horrifies him. He stops himself, turns away, and flees the house, leaving Virginia shaken but untouched.

When Manfred returns from his expedition, Reiner meets him and confesses everything—his betrayal, his schemes, and his moral downfall. Manfred is stunned and deeply wounded, and he severs their friendship. Virginia, still torn, now realizes that despite everything, she loves Reiner. Yet she chooses to remain loyal to her fiancé, believing she cannot forsake her promise.

In a final act of remorse or self-sacrifice, Reiner visits Helene, who is now emotionally broken and kept in seclusion. Seeking to make amends for the destruction he caused, he offers to marry her—a desperate gesture meant to offer her dignity or comfort. But Helene, unhinged and lost in her grief, shoots him.

Believing himself to be dying, Reiner makes his way to see Manfred and Virginia one last time. In a scene filled with sorrow and emotional clarity, Virginia confesses that she loves him, and Manfred, moved by their mutual pain, releases her from their engagement. In a final moment of grace, he gives his blessing.

Reiner survives the shooting. He and Virginia are finally united—not without cost, but with the recognition of love hard-won through guilt, self-awareness, and the unmasking of pride.

== Cast ==
- John Gilbert as Baron Reiner
- Alma Rubens as Countess Zellner
- Theodore Roberts as Count Palester
- Frank Reicher as Count Zellner
- Eva von Berne as Virginia
- Ralph Forbes as Manfred
- Ethel Wales as Virginia's Aunt
- Polly Ann Young as Dancer

== Music ==
This film featured a theme song entitled "Live And Love" which was composed by William Axt, David Mendoza, and Raymond Klages.

== See also ==
- List of early sound feature films (1926–1929)
