= Storm at Daybreak =

1933 American film directed by Richard Boleslawski

- Directed by: Richard Boleslawski
- Screenplay by: Bertram Millhauser
- Based on: Fekete száru Csereszyne; 1931 play by Sándor Hunyady
- Produced by: Lucien Hubbard
- Starring: Kay Francis; Nils Asther; Walter Huston; Phillips Holmes; Eugene Pallette; C. Henry Gordon
- Cinematography: George J. Folsey
- Edited by: Margaret Booth
- Music by: William Axt
- Production company: Metro-Goldwyn-Mayer
- Distributed by: Metro-Goldwyn-Mayer
- Release date: July 14, 1933
- Running time: 78 minutes
- Country: United States
- Language: English

Storm at Daybreak is a 1933 American pre-Code drama film directed by Richard Boleslawski, written by Bertram Millhauser, and starring Kay Francis, Nils Asther, Walter Huston, Phillips Holmes, Eugene Pallette and C. Henry Gordon. It was released on July 14, 1933, by Metro-Goldwyn-Mayer.

== Plot ==
The wife of a Serbian mayor engages in a clandestine affair with her husband's best friend, a Hungarian officer.

== Cast ==
- Kay Francis as Irina Radovic
- Nils Asther as Capt. Geza Petery
- Walter Huston as Mayor Dushan Radovic
- Phillips Holmes as Csaholyi
- Eugene Pallette as Janos
- C. Henry Gordon as Panto Nikitch
- Frank Burk as Jankovitcch (uncredited)
- Louise Closser Hale as Militza Brooska
- Jean Parker as Danitza
- Mischa Auer as Assassin (uncredited)
- Frank Conroy as Archduke Franz Ferdinand (uncredited)
- Leonid Kinskey as Villager (uncredited)
- Akim Tamiroff as Fiddler (uncredited)

== Critical reception ==
The New York Times wrote, "although Richard Boleslavsky has made a good looking production and filled it with the huzzahs and halloos that go with picturesque costumes and romantic warfare, Storm at Daybreak is a dull entertainment."
