= Daybreak (1931 film) =

1931 film

- Directed by: Jacques Feyder
- Screenplay by: Cyril Hume; Ruth Cummings
- Based on: Daybreak by Arthur Schnitzler
- Starring: Ramon Novarro; Helen Chandler; Jean Hersholt; C. Aubrey Smith; William Bakewell; Karen Morley
- Cinematography: Merritt B. Gerstad
- Edited by: Tom Held
- Production company: Metro-Goldwyn-Mayer
- Distributed by: Metro-Goldwyn-Mayer
- Release date: May 2, 1931
- Running time: 85 minutes
- Country: United States
- Language: English

Daybreak is a 1931 American pre-Code drama film directed by Jacques Feyder and written by Cyril Hume and Ruth Cummings. The film stars Ramon Novarro, Helen Chandler, Jean Hersholt, C. Aubrey Smith, William Bakewell and Karen Morley. The film was released on May 2, 1931, by Metro-Goldwyn-Mayer.

== Plot ==
Willi is born into the cream of Vienna society, rising through the ranks of the elite Royal Imperial Guard and becoming an officer. Always having friends and relatives in high places to clean up after him after he screws things up, Willi has no idea what being responsible is. With Willi's uncle, General Von Hertz, in charge of the military base where he is stationed, he knows that whatever mistakes he makes, his uncle will take care of them. One thing Willi does not expect to happen is to fall in love with someone else, besides himself, and accept the responsibility that goes along with that.

At a party with his officer friends at a Vienna nightspot, Willi spots the lovely young music teacher Laura Taub. Later Willi sees Laura going upstairs to a room with big spender and notorious whore-mister Herr Schnabel. Suspecting that Schnabel is up to no good Willi goes to see if everything is all right, only to hear Laura screaming inside the hotel room as she fights off Schnabel from trying to force himself on her. Willi puts an end to Herr Schnabel's advances by punching him. Taking the grateful Laura, who at first does not trust him, on a night on the town, Willi has breakfast the next morning at her apartment, though nothing serious happened between them.

After promising to see her again and kissing her goodbye, Willi innocently leaves a 100 Krone banknote on her dining room table. Laura, who has fallen in love with Willi, after seeing the banknote, now feels insulted by what he did, treating her as if she were just a one-night stand to him or even worse. Laura berates Willi when he comes to see her the next day, leaving him hurt and humiliated, since he has also fallen in love with her.

Laura goes back to the sleazy Herr Schnabel and becomes the kind of person that she thinks that Willi thought that she was, drinking, gambling and whoring around. Guilt-ridden by what he did to Laura, Willi tries to win her back from Schnabel. He challenges Schnabel to a game of baccarat. Schnabel beats Willi badly, leaving him 14,000 kroners in debt. Being too proud to ask his uncle General Von Hertz for the money and facing disgrace as a member of the Royal Imperial Guard, Willi has only one option left open to him: a bullet to the head.

== Cast ==
- Ramon Novarro as Willi
- Helen Chandler as Laura
- Jean Hersholt as Herr Schnabel
- C. Aubrey Smith as General von Hertz
- William Bakewell as Otto
- Karen Morley as Emily Kessner
- Douglass Montgomery as Von Lear
- Glenn Tryon as Franz
- Clyde Cook as Josef
- Sumner Getchell as Emil
- Clara Blandick as Frau Hoffman
- Edwin Maxwell as Herr Hoffman
- Jackie Searl as August
