= The Washington Masquerade =

1932 film

- Directed by: Charles Brabin
- Screenplay by: John Meehan; Samuel Blythe
- Based on: The Claw (La Griffe); 1906 play by Henri Bernstein
- Starring: Lionel Barrymore; Karen MorleyNils Asther; Reginald Barlow
- Cinematography: Gregg Toland
- Edited by: Ben Lewis
- Music by: William Axt
- Production company: Metro-Goldwyn-Mayer
- Distributed by: Loew's Inc.
- Release date: July 9, 1932
- Running time: 88 minutes
- Country: United States
- Language: English

The Washington Masquerade is a 1932 American Pre-Code drama film directed by Charles Brabin and written by John Meehan and Samuel Blythe. The film stars Lionel Barrymore, Karen Morley, Nils Asther and Reginald Barlow. The film was released on July 9, 1932, by Metro-Goldwyn-Mayer. It was based on 1906 French play by Henri Bernstein. A New York World review drew comparisons with American Madness released by Columbia Pictures the same year.

== Plot ==
After successfully freeing a wrongfully convicted boy from prison, attorney Jeff Keane is nominated and elected to the United States Senate. Although Keane had been aloof from politics, his crusade against big business becomes popular yet controversial. At a White House gala, Keane meets Consuela Fairbanks, a socialite whom he eventually marries despite his daughter Ruth's protestations.

After the marriage, Consuela confesses that she is heavily in debt and urges Jeff to resign and join lobbyist Alan Hinsdale's law firm. After discovering that Hinsdale is corrupt and that Consuela is having an affair with her former lover Henri Brenner, Jeff and Ruth open a Senate investigation of Hinsdale and his colleague Senator Bitler.

In emotional testimony, an exhausted Jeff confesses to bribery during his dealings with Hinsdale but exposes the scandal for prosecution by the United States Attorney General. The stress causes Jeff to die of a heart attack at the end of his speech, and Stapleton later notes that "he loved his country enough to die for it."

== Cast ==
- Lionel Barrymore as Jeff Keane
- Karen Morley as Consuela Fairbanks
- Diane Sinclair as Ruth Keane
- Nils Asther as Brenner
- Reginald Barlow as Senator Withers
- William Collier, Sr. as Babcock
- William Morris as Senator Hodge
- Rafaela Ottiano as Mona
- C. Henry Gordon as Hinsdale
- Berton Churchill as Senator Bitler
- Henry Kolker as Stapleton

== Bibliography ==
- Goble, Alan. The Complete Index to Literary Sources in Film. Walter de Gruyter, 1999.
- Scott, Ian. Robert Riskin: The Life and Times of a Hollywood Screenwriter. University Press of Kentucky, 2021.
