= Our Dancing Daughters =

1928 film

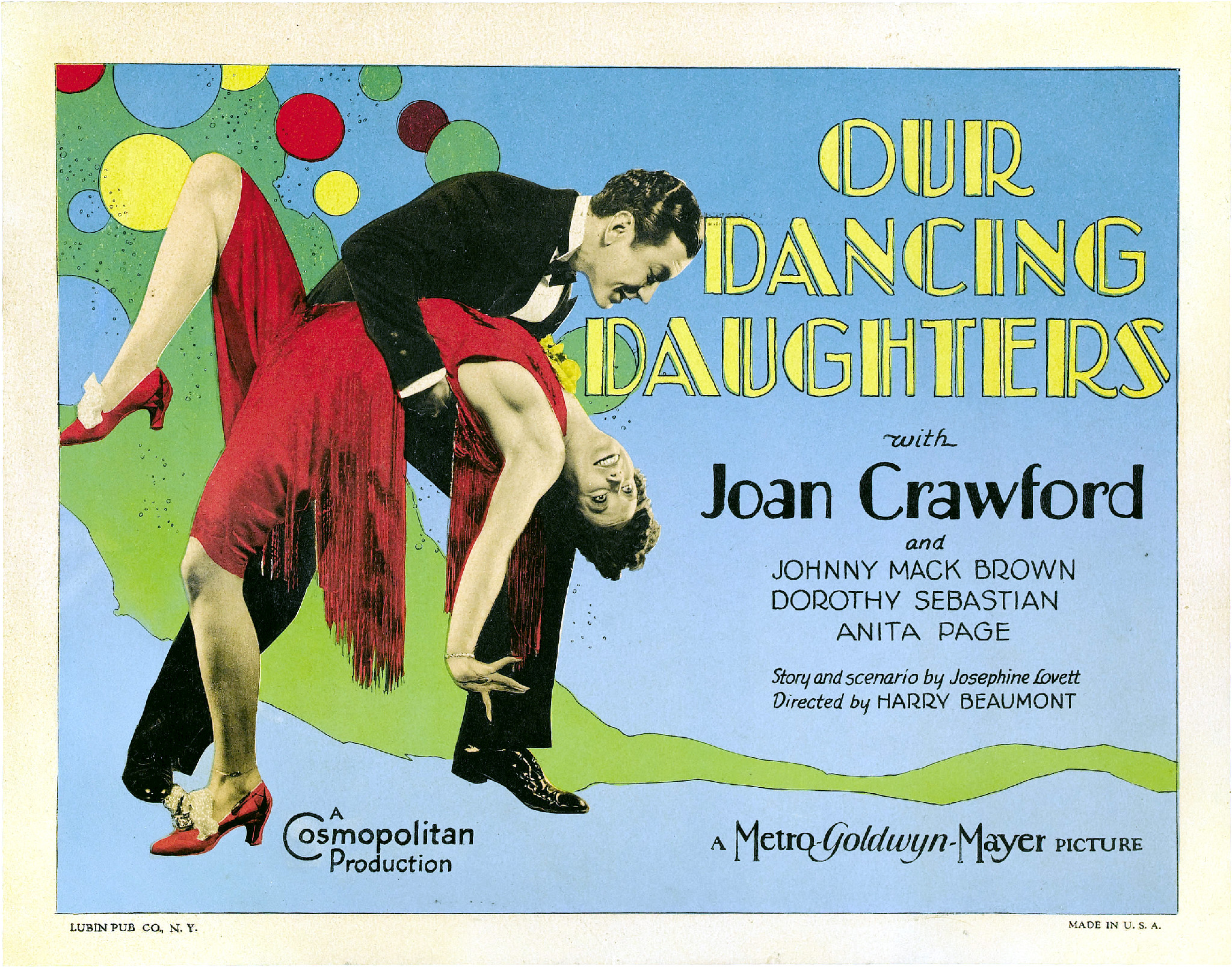
- Lobby card
- Directed by: Harry Beaumont
- Written by: Titles; Marian Ainslee; Ruth Cummings
- Story by: Josephine Lovett (and scenario)
- Produced by: Hunt Stromberg
- Starring: Joan Crawford; John Mack Brown
- Cinematography: George Barnes
- Edited by: William Hamilton
- Music by: William Axt
- Production company: Cosmopolitan Productions
- Distributed by: Metro-Goldwyn-Mayer
- Release date: September 1, 1928
- Running time: 97 minutes
- Country: United States
- Languages: Sound film (Synchronized); English Intertitles
- Budget: $178,000
- Box office: $1,099,000

Our Dancing Daughters is a 1928 American synchronized sound drama film starring Joan Crawford and John Mack Brown about the "loosening of youth morals" that took place during the 1920s. The film was directed by Harry Beaumont and produced by Hunt Stromberg. While the film has no audible dialog, it was released with a synchronized musical score with sound effects using both the sound-on-disc and sound-on-film process.

The film launched the career of Joan Crawford.

== Plot ==
Our Dancing Daughters (1928; synchronized sound)

"Dangerous Diana" Medford is outwardly flamboyant and popular but inwardly virtuous and idealistic, patronizing her parents by telling them not to stay out late. Her friend Ann chases boys for their money and is as amoral as her mother.

Diana and Ann are both attracted to Ben Blaine. He takes Diana's flirtatious behavior with other boys as a sign of lack of interest in him and marries Ann, who has lied about her virtues. Bea, a mutual friend of Diana and Ann, also meets and marries a wealthy suitor named Norman who loves her but is haunted by her past.

Diana becomes distraught for a while about the marriages of her friends with questionable pasts. She decides to go away and Bea throws a raucous bon voyage party at the yacht club (complete with sculpted ice ocean liner centerpiece), which Ben declined to attend and made Ann decline as well. The same evening Ann hopes to meet up with her lover, Freddie, telling her husband she is going to see her sick mom. When her mom calls and Ben realizes Ann has lied to him yet again, they get into an argument and Ann storms out to meet Freddie.

Now alone, Ben decides to stop by the party where he and Diana realize their love for each other. Meanwhile, a drunken Ann follows Freddie into the party only to find Ben and Diana alone together in a quiet room. She causes an uproar, after which both Diana and Ben leave the party declaring their love but ultimately saying goodbye to one another.

Norman arrives at the dwindling party to find Bea trying to help the inebriated Ann home. On her way out, Ann mocks a trio of cleaning women and reflects on her and her mother's gold-digging strategy. Distracted by this, she stumbles and falls down a flight of stairs to her death. Headlines tell of Diana's return home after two years away, upon which she and Ben are happily reunited.

== Cast ==
- Joan Crawford as Diana "Di" Medford aka Diana the Dangerous
- John Mack Brown as Ben Blaine
- Nils Asther as Norman
- Dorothy Sebastian as Beatrice "Bea"
- Anita Page as Ann "Annikins"
- Kathlyn Williams as Ann's mother
- Edward J. Nugent as Freddie
- Dorothy Cumming as Diana's mother
- Huntley Gordon as Diana's father
- Evelyn Hall as Freddie's mother
- Sam De Grasse as Freddie's father

== Music ==
This film featured a theme song entitled "I Loved You Then As I Love You Now" which was composed by William Axt, David Mendoza, and Ballard Macdonald.

== Reception ==
Bland Johnson in the New York Mirror wrote "Joan Crawford...does the greatest work of her career." The film was also nominated for two Academy Awards for Best Writing (Josephine Lovett) and Best Cinematography (George Barnes) at the 2nd Academy Awards on April 3, 1930.

=== Box office ===
According to MGM records, the film earned $757,000 in the U.S. and Canada and $342,000 in other markets, resulting in a profit of $304,000.

=== Censorship ===
When Our Dancing Daughters was released, many states and cities in the United States had censor boards that could require cuts or other eliminations before the film could be shown. Among cuts required by the Kansas censor board was a cut of an intertitle with the caption "Before I met you, Norman—–before I knew anything about love—–things happened."

=== Cultural impact ===
It was due in part to Joan Crawford's role as the ferociously free Charleston-dancing, Prohibition-era-booze-swilling, stage-diving "Dangerous" Diana Medford that F. Scott Fitzgerald wrote:

Joan Crawford is doubtless the best example of the flapper, the girl you see in smart night clubs, gowned to the apex of sophistication, toying iced glasses with a remote, faintly bitter expression, dancing deliciously, laughing a great deal, with wide, hurt eyes. Young things with a talent for living.

== Home media ==
The film was released on December 3, 2010 on DVD and on Blu-ray on January 10, 2023.

== See also ==
- List of early sound feature films (1926–1929)
