= The Tower of Lies =

1925 film

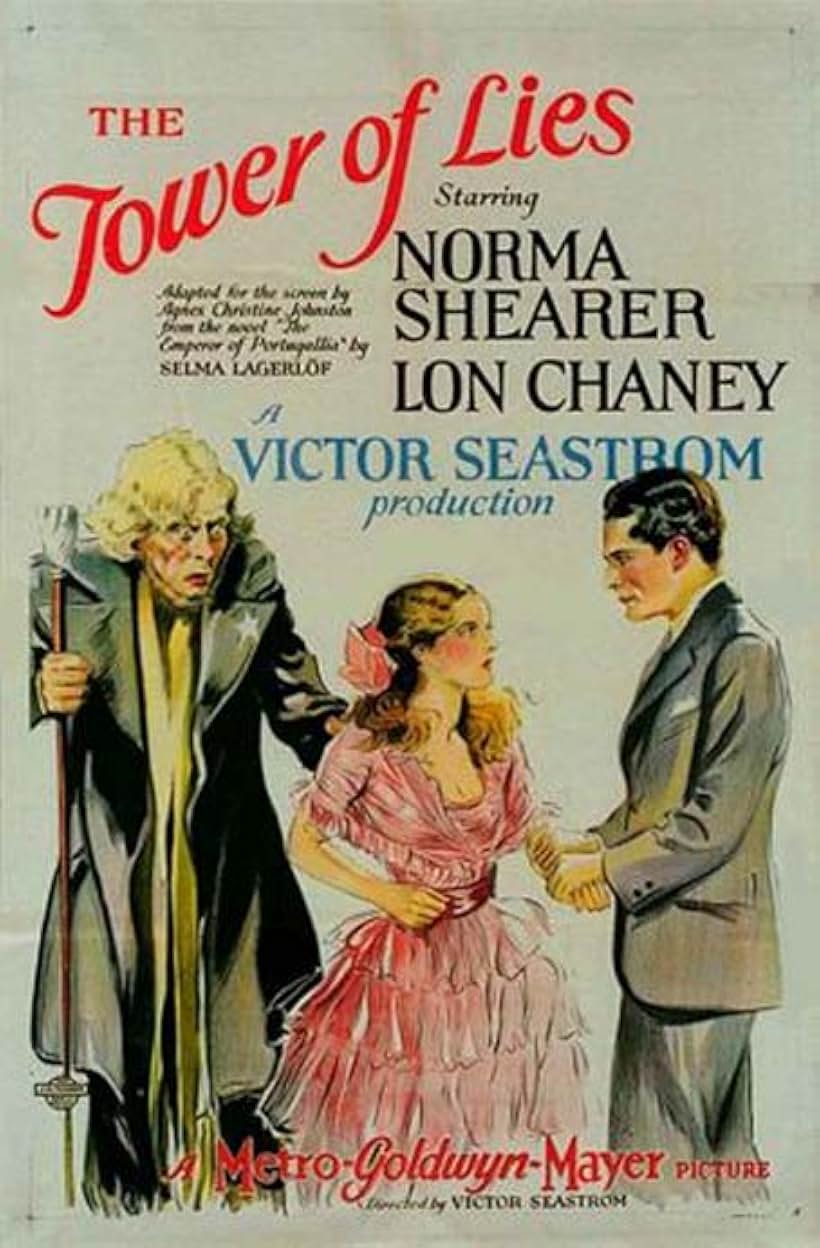
- Theatrical release poster
- Directed by: Victor Sjöström
- Written by: Agnes Christine Johnston; Max Marcin; Marian Ainslee (titles); Ruth Cummings (titles)
- Based on: The Emperor of Portugallia by Selma Lagerlöf
- Produced by: Irving Thalberg; Louis B Mayer
- Starring: Norma Shearer; Lon Chaney; Ian Keith; Claire McDowell
- Cinematography: Percy Hilburn (French)
- Distributed by: Metro-Goldwyn-Mayer
- Release date: October 11, 1925 (United States)
- Running time: 70 minutes (7 reels)
- Country: United States
- Language: Silent film (English intertitles)

The Tower of Lies is a 1925 American silent drama film directed by Victor Sjöström. It was written by Agnes Christine Johnston and Max Marcin, based upon Selma Lagerlöf's 1914 novel The Emperor of Portugallia (MGM actually purchased the story rights in 1922). The film was supposed to be called The Emperor of Portugallia, but was later changed to The Tower of Lies.

Released one year after He Who Gets Slapped, the film marks the second collaboration between Sjöström, Lon Chaney and Norma Shearer. Also starring are William Haines, Ian Keith and Lew Cody.

The film's sets were designed by the art director James Basevi and Cedric Gibbons. The film was shot on location in the Sacramento River Delta, Lake Arrowhead and the Laurel Canyon area of Los Angeles. It took 53 days to complete at a cost of $185,000. It grossed $653,000 worldwide.

"Film Mercury" voted Chaney's performance as one of the year's best. It is considered a lost film, although rumors persist that a print may exist in Denmark. Stills exist showing Chaney in his "Jan" makeup, which took him three hours each day to apply.

== Plot ==
Jan is a Swedish farmer and Glory is his beloved daughter. When she was a child, she and her father used to role-play being the Emperor and Empress of Portugallia, a fairy tale land where dreams come true, and a neighboring farm boy named August would play the Prince. Glory grows up to be a beautiful young woman, and both August and Jan's vile landlord Lars vie for her attention.

Jan incurs some debts he cannot pay, and to save him from bankruptcy, his daughter temporarily moves to the big city supposedly to get a job (finally allowing Lars to lead her into prostitution). After a time, the landlord tells Jan his daughter has succeeded in paying off his debts, but will not tell him how she earned the money. Realizing that his daughter has been selling herself to help him avoid bankruptcy, Jan's mind slowly begins to unravel. Years pass and his daughter never returns to the farm, and every day Jan waits down by the riverboat hoping she will come home.

Eventually she does return to him, but by this time, Jan's mind has snapped and he actually believes that he is the Emperor of Portugallia and she is his Empress. Jan has taken to wearing a strange military uniform and a circus hat, and his hair and long beard have all turned gray (see photo). Glory's fine attire leads the villagers to believe that she has been living as a prostitute and they demand she leave town. Only August is willing to stand by her and protect her honor.

Glory boards the local steamboat at the docks in order to leave town, and her father follows her, falling off the pier in his haste and drowning. When the ship's captain throws the boat into reverse in an attempt to save Jan, Lars (who is taunting Glory from the ship's deck) is thrown into the paddlewheel and crushed to death. Glory winds up marrying August and settling down in town with him.

== Cast ==
- Norma Shearer as Glory (Goldie in some sources)
- Lon Chaney as Jan
- Ian Keith as Lars
- Claire McDowell as Katrina
- William Haines as August
- David Torrence as Eric
- Edward Connelly as Curate
- Mary Jane Irving as Little Girl
- Bodil Rosing as Midwife
- Anne Schaefer as Helma
- Adele Watson as Farmer's Wife
- Leo White as Peddler
- Lew Cody

== Critical Comments ==
"Notwithstanding that TOWER OF LIES is a sincerely made picture and excellent from the artistic and literary viewpoints, it is too heavy for the picture audiences. When finished the impression left is that one more prostitute has reformed and been forgiven...The acting is aces and the direction masterful. But with all this, TOWER OF LIES can never be anything more than a soggy picture made bearable by the leavening forces of Seastrom, Chaney and Shearer." ---Variety

"THE TOWER OF LIES is a beautiful production with a flash of poignant drama at its end...Chaney and Miss Shearer especially are splendid." ---Moving Picture World

"It seems as if Mr. Chaney had had too much to say about his own performance, for he overacts and his make-up, consisting largely of a rich crop of iron gray hair and whiskers and beard, seem to fit well without looking as if they belonged to him. Mr. Chaney's exaggerated actions and expressions appear to have been contagious, for Mr. Seastrom himself betrays a weakness for overemphasizing a number of points." ---The New York Times

"A distinctive and rare artistic achievement... A very worthy effort and yet probably not the best box office. Chaney passes by his usual grotesque characterization and does something just a bit different." ---Film Daily

"(Chaney) does not resort to the grotesque, but from the first sequences, where he appears as the tiller of the soil who neither loves nor hates....to the last when he becomes a demented old man, his interpretation is pathetically convincing." --- Movie Magazine

"Mr. Chaney's performance struck me as being a notable one. Toward the close of the film, Chaney is far more than a mere artificer. He really is Jan, the gnarled, mad old peasant." ---New York Tribune

"Though Mr. Seastrom's direction and the acting of the players are masterful, the theme is not very pleasant. Some picture-goers may like this picture very well, while others will not. Mr. Chaney does excellent work and awakens warm sympathy in a role that is the exact opposite in nature to these he has been given in pictures lately." ----Harrison's Reports

== Preservation ==
The Tower of Lies is now considered a lost film. The last known surviving copy of the film was reportedly destroyed in the 1965 MGM vault fire.

== See also ==
- List of lost films
