= The Mysterious Lady =

1928 film

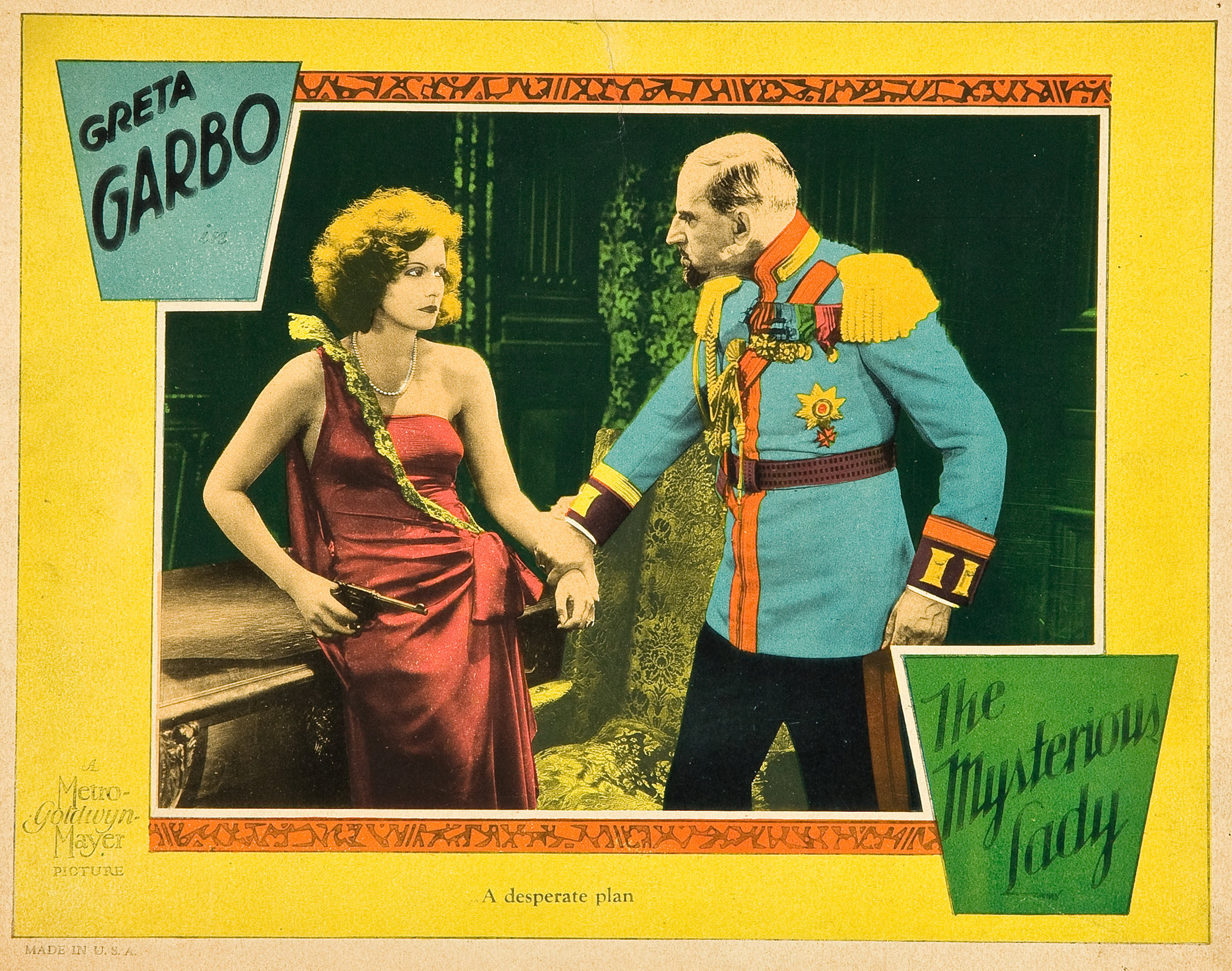
- Lobby card
- Directed by: Fred Niblo
- Screenplay by: Bess Meredyth; Marian Ainslee and Ruth Cummings (titles)
- Based on: War in the Dark; 1915 novel by Ludwig Wolff
- Produced by: Fred Niblo
- Starring: Greta Garbo; Conrad Nagel; Gustav von Seyffertitz
- Cinematography: William H. Daniels
- Edited by: Margaret Booth
- Distributed by: Metro-Goldwyn-Mayer
- Release date: August 4, 1928
- Running time: 89 minutes (U.S.); 96 minutes (UK)
- Country: United States
- Languages: Silent film English intertitles
- Budget: $336,973.22
- Box office: $1,084,000 (worldwide rentals)

The Mysterious Lady is a 1928 American silent romantic drama film directed by Fred Niblo and starring Greta Garbo, Conrad Nagel, and Gustav von Seyffertitz. Released by Metro-Goldwyn-Mayer, it is vaguely based on the novel War in the Dark by Ludwig Wolff.

Full film

The film grossed $543,000 in the United States and $541,000 elsewhere, grossing $1,084,000 worldwide; its profit was $369,000.

== Plot ==
In Vienna, Captain Karl von Raden purchases a returned ticket to a sold-out opera and finds himself sharing a loge with a lovely woman. Though she repulses his first advance, she does spend an idyllic day with him in the countryside, where romance blossoms.

Before Karl can return to duty, his uncle, Colonel Eric von Raden, the chief of the secret police, assigns him an important mission to deliver secret plans to officials in Berlin, but he also warns his nephew that the woman he just met is Tania Fedorova, a top Russian spy. Tania surprises Karl, meeting him on board the train. Here she professes her love to him, but he informs her that he has been deceived, and is well aware that she is a spy. Dejected by his reaction, Tania leaves his compartment.

When the train stops the next morning, Karl wakes up and finds the secret plans have been stolen. As a result, he is court martialed and sentenced to military degradation and imprisonment for treason. However, Colonel von Raden visits him in prison and arranges for his release. He sends his nephew to Warsaw, posing as a Serbian pianist, to seek out the identity of the real traitor and thus exonerate himself.

In Warsaw, by chance, Karl is asked to play at a private party where he once again crosses paths with Tania. She is being escorted by General Boris Alexandroff, the infatuated head of the Russian Military Intelligence Department. Foolhardily, Karl plays a tune from the opera they attended together. She recognizes it, but does not betray him. As the party goers are leaving, she slips away for a few stolen moments with her love. The jealous Alexandroff suspects their feelings for each other. He hires Karl to play the next day at a ball he is giving at his mansion for Tania's birthday.

While Alexandroff and Tania are alone in his home office, he receives a parcel containing the latest secrets stolen by the traitor, whom he casually identifies as Max Heinrich. Later, Tania steals the documents, gives them to Karl, and sends him out via a secret passage. However, it is all a trap. Alexandroff comes in and tells Tania that what she stole was mere blank paper; he shows her the real documents. He pulls out a gun and announces that he intends to use it on Karl, who has been captured outside. She struggles with Alexandroff and manages to fatally shoot him; the sound goes unheard amidst the merriment of the party. When the guards bring the prisoner, she pretends the general is still alive and wants to see him alone. She and Karl escape with the incriminating documents and get married.

== Cast ==
- Greta Garbo as Tania Fedorova
- Conrad Nagel as Captain Karl von Raden
- Gustav von Seyffertitz as General Boris Alexandroff
- Albert Pollet as Max Heinrich
- Edward Connelly as Colonel Eric von Raden
- Richard Alexander as General's Aide
- Betty Blythe as Opera singer (*uncredited)(per the dvd commentary track Jeffrey Vance and Tony Maietta)

== Home media ==
Warner Home Video released The Mysterious Lady to DVD in 2005 as part of a box set called The Garbo Silents Collection with a music score by Vivek Maddala. The home video version contains an audio commentary track by film historians Jeffrey Vance and Tony Maietta.
