= Foreign Devils (film) =

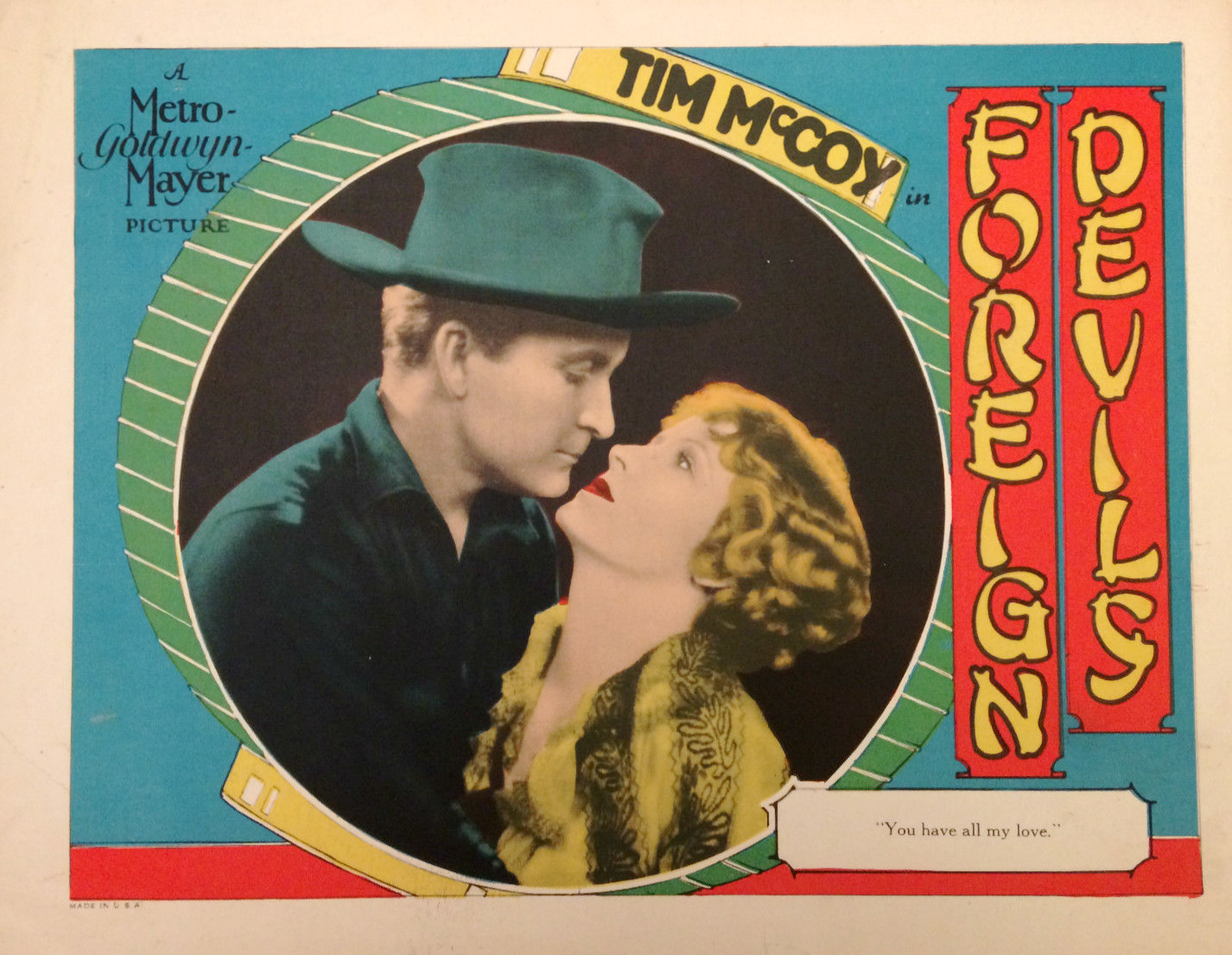
- Lobby card
- Directed by: W. S. Van Dyke
- Screenplay by: Marian Ainslee
- Story by: Marian Ainslee; Ruth Cummings; Peter B. Kyne
- Starring: Tim McCoy; Claire Windsor
- Cinematography: Clyde De Vinna
- Edited by: Sam Zimbalist
- Distributed by: Metro-Goldwyn-Mayer
- Release date: September 3, 1927
- Running time: 70 minutes
- Country: United States
- Language: Silent (English intertitles)

Foreign Devils is a 1927 American silent drama film directed by W. S. Van Dyke and starring Tim McCoy and Claire Windsor, which was released by MGM on September 3, 1927.

== Plot ==
Captain Robert Kelly (McCoy) while attached to the American Embassy in Peking at the time of the Boxer Rebellion befriends Lady Patricia Rutledge (Windsor) and rescues her from the priests of a Chinese temple that she has gone to visit. He then asks a friend to escort her to safety and battles the Chinese in order to give them time to escape. Eventually he brings news or the approach of the Eight-Nation Alliance to the barricade.

== Cast ==
- Tim McCoy as Capt. Robert Kelly
- Claire Windsor as Lady Patricia Rutledge
- Cyril Chadwick as Lord Vivien Cholmondely
- Frank Currier as U.S. Minister Conger
- Emily Fitzroy as Mrs. Conger
- Lawson Butt as Sir Claude
- Sôjin as Lama priest (as Sojin)
- Frank Chew as Prince Tuan

== Crew ==
- Cedric Gibbons - Art Director
- David Townsend - Art Director
- René Hubert - Costume Design
