= Oliver T. Marsh =

American cinematographer (1892–1941)

- Born: Oliver Taylor Marsh; January 30, 1892; Kansas City, Missouri, U.S.
- Died: May 5, 1941 (aged 49); Hollywood, California, U.S.
- Occupation: Cinematographer

Oliver Taylor Marsh (January 30, 1892 – May 5, 1941) was a prolific Hollywood cinematographer. He worked on over eighty films just for Metro-Goldwyn-Mayer alone.

Marsh was born January 30, 1892, in Kansas City, Missouri. He is the brother of actresses Marguerite Marsh (1888–1925) and Mae Marsh (1894–1968), as well as editor Frances Marsh, and the father of jazz saxophonist Warne Marsh (1927–1987).

Marsh worked on Sadie Thompson (1928), Rain (1932), The Merry Widow (1934), David Copperfield (1935), A Tale of Two Cities (1935), The Great Ziegfeld (1936), San Francisco (1936) and Another Thin Man (1939). He and Allen Davey received Academy Honorary Awards "for the color cinematography of the Metro-Goldwyn-Mayer production, Sweethearts" (1938) at the 11th Academy Awards. The pair were also nominated for Best Cinematography (Color) for Bitter Sweet (1940).

He died on May 5, 1941, and is interred at Forest Lawn Memorial Park in Glendale, California.

== Partial filmography ==
- Dodging a Million (1918)
- The Floor Below (1918)
- Joan of Plattsburg (1918)
- The Racing Strain (1918)
- All Woman (1918)
- A Virtuous Vamp (1919)
- Good References (1920)
- The Point of View (1920)
- The Perfect Woman (1920)
- Dangerous Business (1920)
- Something Different (1920)
- Mama's Affair (1921)
- Wedding Bells (1921)
- Woman's Place (1921)
- Red Hot Romance (1922)
- The Mohican's Daughter (1922)
- Peacock Alley (1922)
- Fascination (1922)
- Broadway Rose (1922)
- Jazzmania (1923)
- The French Doll (1923)
- Fashion Row (1923)
- The Unknown Purple (1923)
- Daring Love (1924)
- Married Flirts (1924)
- Circe, the Enchantress (1924)
- The Merry Widow (1925)
- The Midshipman (1925)
- Time, the Comedian (1925)
- The Masked Bride (1925)
- Soul Mates (1925)
- Kiki (1926)
- The Duchess of Buffalo (1926)
- Camille (1926)
- Annie Laurie (1927)
- The Enemy (1927)
- The Dove (1927)
- Sadie Thompson (1928)
- The Divine Woman (1928)
- The Smart Set (1928)
- The Masks of the Devil (1928)
- Dream of Love (1928)
- Eternal Love (1929)
- The Single Standard (1929)
- Marianne (1929) (silent and musical versions)
- Our Modern Maidens (1929)
- Untamed (1929)
- Not So Dumb (1930)
- Strictly Unconventional (1930)
- In Gay Madrid (1930)
- The Florodora Girl (1930)
- Du Barry, Woman of Passion (1930)
- New Moon (1930)
- The Bachelor Father (1931)
- It's a Wise Child (1931)
- Just a Gigolo (1931)
- The Man in Possession (1931)
- The Phantom of Paris (1931)
- New Adventures of Get Rich Quick Wallingford (1931)
- The Sin of Madelon Claudet (1931)
- Possessed (1931)
- Emma (1932)
- Arsène Lupin (1932)
- But the Flesh Is Weak (1932)
- Divorce in the Family (1932)
- Rain (1932)
- Faithless (1932)
- The Son-Daughter (1932)
- Today We Live (1933)
- Night Flight (1933)
- Dancing Lady (1933)
- The Merry Widow (1934)
- David Copperfield (1935)
- One New York Night (1935)
- Baby Face Harrington (1935)
- No More Ladies (1935)
- A Tale of Two Cities (1935)
- The Great Ziegfeld (1936)
- Small Town Girl (1936)
- San Francisco (1936)
- Women Are Trouble (1936)
- His Brother's Wife (1936)
- Maytime (1937)
- The Emperor's Candlesticks (1937) (uncredited)
- The Firefly (1937)
- Rosalie (1937)
- The Girl of the Golden West (1938)
- The Toy Wife (1938)
- The Crowd Roars (1938) (uncredited)
- Sweethearts (1938)
- The Ice Follies of 1939 (1939)
- Broadway Serenade (1939)
- It's a Wonderful World (1939)
- The Women (1939)
- Another Thin Man (1939)
- Broadway Melody of 1940 (1940)
- I Love You Again (1940)
- Bitter Sweet (1940)
- The Wild Man of Borneo (1941)
- Blonde Inspiration (1941)
- Rage in Heaven (1941)
- Lady Be Good (1941)
