= Josephine Lovett =

American actress and screenwriter (1877–1958)

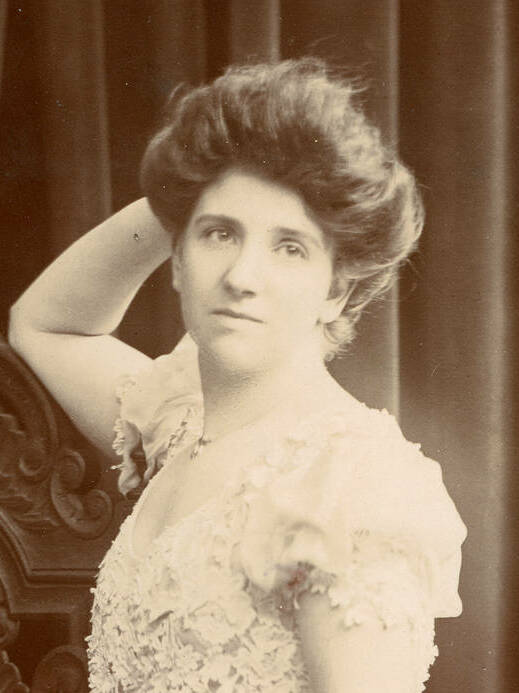
- Born: 21 October 1877; San Francisco, California, US
- Died: 17 September 1958 (aged 80); Rancho Santa Fe, California, US
- Occupations: Scenario writer, adapter, screenwriter, and actress
- Years active: 1916–1935
- Spouse: John S. Robertson

Josephine Lovett (October 21, 1877 – September 17, 1958) was an American scenario writer, adapter, screenwriter and actress, active in films from 1916 to 1935. She was married to Canadian-born director, John Stewart Robertson. She is best known for her then-risqué film Our Dancing Daughters in 1928. Her screenplays typically included a heroine who was oftentimes economically and sexually independent.

== Early years ==
Josephine, also known as Mrs. John Stewart Robertson, was born October 21, 1877, in San Francisco, California. Although she later returned to California, she temporarily moved to New York, New York, where she started her career as a successful stage actress at Haverly's 14th Street Theatre, on Sixth Avenue. On Broadway she appeared with Andrew Mack in Tom Moore, 1901. Her husband also worked as a stage actor briefly at Haverly's 14th Street in 1903. Lovett worked as a stage actress from 1899 to 1906 and made a motion picture appearance as an actress in 1916. She played the character of "Rachel Blake" in the 1916 drama entitled The Ninety and Nine, directed by Ralph Ince at the Vitagraph Company. Lovett and her husband worked on numerous films together at Vitagraph, which was later bought by Warner Brothers in 1925. The Vitagraph films were not the only films they collaborated on. Eighteen of Lovett's thirty-three film-acknowledgements (screenplay, adaption, scenario and actress) between 1916–1935 were directed by her husband, John. She was a major contributor to John's success as she oftentimes assisted with his films' scene visualization.

== Career ==
Prior to her involvement in the film industry, Lovett was a Broadway actress appearing in various plays from 1899 to 1915. One popular play was 1901's Tom Moore starring Andrew Mack. Josephine was one of the most prominent female writers of her time. She was known for her ability to capture female audiences while simultaneously appeasing censors. By doing so, she along with the other female screenwriters of her generation, helped elaborate the modernization of American mentality from Victorianism to the flapper. Her screenplays and scenarios consisted of sexually suggestive material, just skirting censors. She is best known for her 1930 Academy Award-nominated film Our Dancing Daughters, produced by the Metro-Goldwyn-Mayer Company and novelized by Winifred Van Duzer. The 1928 drama was famous actress Joan Crawford's breakthrough role, where she played Diana Medford, also known as "Dangerous Diana", a young rebellious woman representing Lovett's typical risqué content and visuals. The film's plot surrounds the flamboyant and wild lifestyle of best friends Diana and Ann, who are in love with the same man. Critics and reviews mentioned the viewing of exposed "undies and much stocking", and complained that "cocktails, flasks and mad dancing appear in quite a number of episodes [and] it is quite unnecessary to depict an intoxicated girl, as is done for a considerable length of this film". Despite these notions, the film earned Lovett a nomination in writing achievement at the Academy Awards in 1930. The film's success can also be attributed to the producers' attempts at adding sound effects and a music track, an extraordinary feature prior to the "Talkies" in the 1930s.

== Later years ==
Lovett and her husband collaborated for her final film, Captain Hurricane, in 1935. The RKO Radio Pictures-produced film was based on the life of a fisherman living in Cape Cod, Massachusetts. Robertson ended his directing career later that same year with the film Our Little Girl, starring the famous Shirley Temple. Lovett and her husband retired to Rancho Santa Fe, California, where she assisted Robertson with the establishment of the Rancho Riding Club in 1945. Thirteen years later, Lovett died at the age of eighty in Rancho Santa Fe, on September 17, 1958, six years before her beloved husband's death in 1964. The couple are buried at the Mount Pleasant Cemetery in Ontario, Canada.

== Filmography ==
- 1935 Captain Hurricane (screenplay)
- 1934 Two Alone (screenplay)
- 1933 Jennie Gerhardt (writer)
- 1932 Madame Butterfly (screenplay)
- 1932 Hot Saturday (adaptation)
- 1932 Thunder Below
- 1932 Tomorrow and Tomorrow
- 1931 Corsair (screenplay)
- 1931 The Road to Reno (screenplay)
- 1930 What a Widow! (story)
- 1929 Our Modern Maidens (story and continuity by)
- 1929 The Single Standard (adaptation and scenario)
- 1928 Our Dancing Daughters (story and scenario)
- 1927 The Road to Romance
- 1927 The Bugle Call
- 1927 Annie Laurie (screenplay) / (story)
- 1925 Shore Leave
- 1925 Soul-Fire
- 1925 New Toys
- 1924 Classmates
- 1924 The Enchanted Cottage
- 1923 Twenty-One (writer)
- 1923 The Rendezvous (adaptation)
- 1923 The Fighting Blade (scenario)
- 1922 Outcast
- 1922 Tess of the Storm Country (scenario)
- 1922 The Spanish Jade
- 1922 Love's Boomerang
- 1921 Footlights
- 1921 Sentimental Tommy
- 1920 Away Goes Prudence (story)
- 1916 His Wife's Good Name (story)
- 1916 Love and Trout (Short) (scenario)
- 1916 The Ninety and Nine
