= California (1927 film) =

1927 film

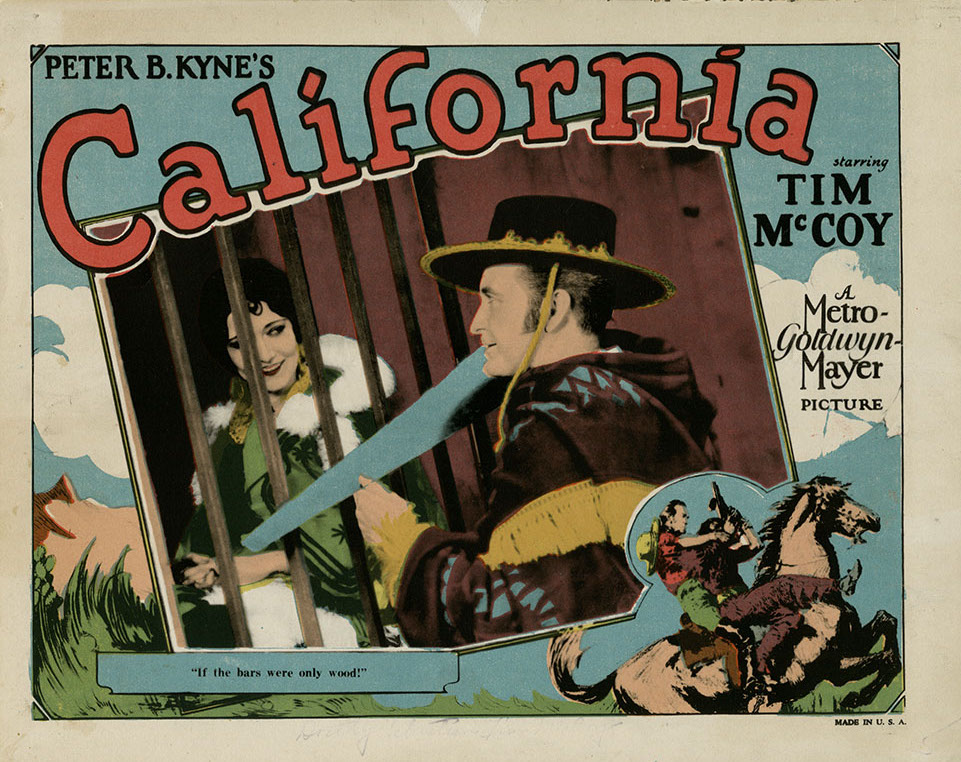
- Directed by: W. S. Van Dyke
- Screenplay by: Marian Ainslee; Ruth Cummings; Frank Davis
- Story by: Peter B. Kyne
- Produced by: Erich Pommer
- Starring: Tim McCoy; Dorothy Sebastian; Marc McDermott; Frank Currier; Fred Warren
- Cinematography: Clyde De Vinna
- Edited by: Basil Wrangell
- Production company: Metro-Goldwyn-Mayer
- Distributed by: Metro-Goldwyn-Mayer
- Release date: May 7, 1927
- Running time: 56 minutes
- Country: United States
- Languages: Silent; English intertitles

California is a 1927 American silent Western film directed by W. S. Van Dyke and written by Marian Ainslee, Ruth Cummings and Frank Davis. The film stars Tim McCoy, Dorothy Sebastian, Marc McDermott, Frank Currier and Fred Warren. The film was released on May 7, 1927, by Metro-Goldwyn-Mayer.

== Plot ==
The film dramatized the Battle of San Pasqual, of December 6–7, 1846, a battle of the Mexican–American War 1846-1848, in which General Stephen W. Kearny's U.S. Dragoons fought Californio lancers in the San Pasqual Valley, just east of Escondido, California.

== Cast ==
- Tim McCoy as Capt. Archibald Gillespie
- Dorothy Sebastian as Carlotta del Rey
- Marc McDermott as Drachano
- Frank Currier as Don Carlos del Rey
- Fred Warren as Kit Carson
- Lillian Leighton as Duenna
- Edwin Terry as Brig. Gen. Stephen W. Kearny
