= Our Modern Maidens =

1929 film

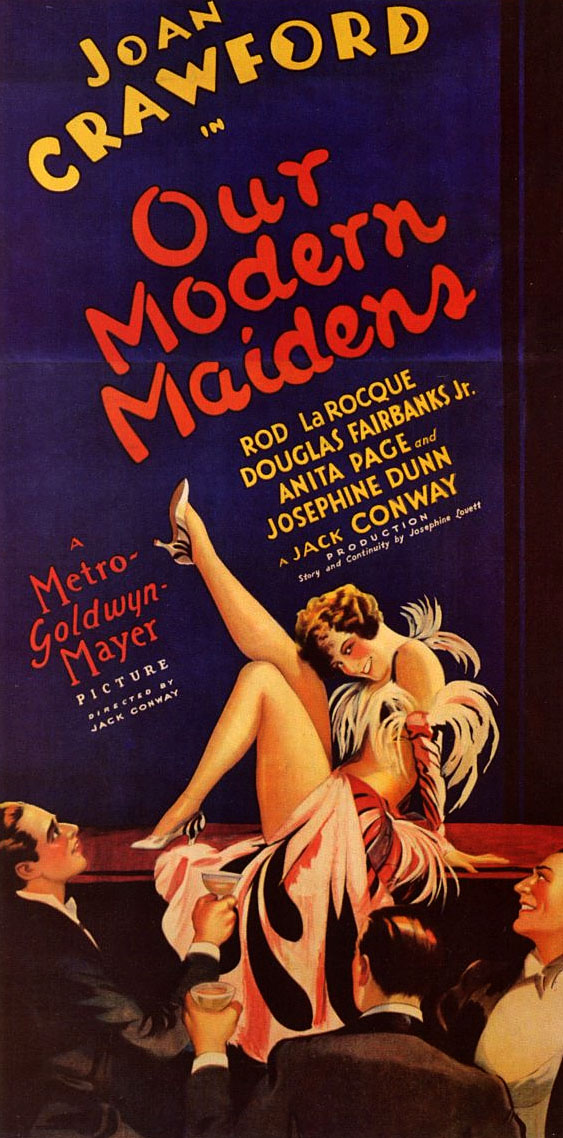
- Theatrical release poster
- Directed by: Jack Conway
- Written by: Marian Ainslee; Ruth Cummings
- Screenplay by: Josephine Lovett
- Story by: Josephine Lovett
- Produced by: Jack Conway; Hunt Stromberg (Uncredited)
- Starring: Joan Crawford; Rod La Rocque; Douglas Fairbanks Jr. Anita Page
- Cinematography: Oliver Marsh
- Edited by: Sam S. Zimbalist
- Music by: William Axt (Uncredited); Arthur Lange
- Distributed by: Metro-Goldwyn-Mayer
- Release date: August 24, 1929
- Running time: 76 mins.
- Country: United States
- Languages: Sound (Synchronized); English intertitles
- Budget: $283,000
- Box office: $857,000

Our Modern Maidens is a 1929 American synchronized sound comedy-drama film directed by Jack Conway. While the film has no audible dialog, it was released with a synchronized musical score with sound effects using both the sound-on-disc and sound-on-film process. The film stars Joan Crawford in her last film role without dialogue, the film also stars Rod La Rocque, Douglas Fairbanks Jr., and Anita Page.

== Plot ==
Our Modern Maidens (1929)

Heiress Billie Brown is engaged to marry her longtime sweetheart, budding diplomat Gil Jordan. When Billie goes to see senior diplomat Glenn Abbott about ensuring that Gil get a favorable assignment, Billie and Glenn are undeniably attracted to one another. Gil is likewise attracted to Kentucky Strafford, Billie's houseguest, who becomes pregnant by Gil. Gil finds that he loves Kentucky, but marries Billie instead. Once Billie realizes that Kentucky is pregnant with Gil's child, their marriage is annulled and both are paired up with the people they truly love.

== Cast ==
- Joan Crawford as Billie Brown
- Rod La Rocque as Glenn Abbott aka "Dynamite"
- Douglas Fairbanks Jr. as Gil Jordan
- Anita Page as Kentucky Strafford
- Josephine Dunn as Ginger
- Edward Nugent as Reg
- Albert Gran as B. Bickering Brown

== Music ==
The film featured a theme song entitled "I've Waited a Lifetime for You" by Joe Goodwin (words) and Gus Edwards (music).

== Censorship ==
When Our Modern Maidens was released, many states and cities in the United States had censor boards that could require cuts or other eliminations before the film could be shown. While the Chicago Board of Censors may not have required any cuts, it passed the film with a pink ticket, or "adults only" while showing at the Chicago Theatre.

== Box office ==
According to MGM records, the film earned $675,000 in the US and Canada and $182,000 elsewhere resulting in a profit of $248,000.

== See also ==
- List of early sound feature films (1926–1929)
