= Annie Laurie (1927 film) =

1927 American silent romantic drama film

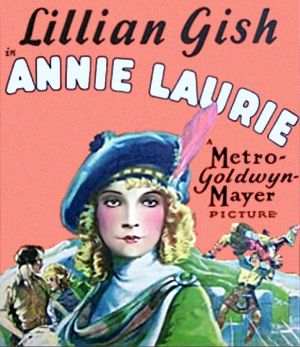
- Film poster
- Directed by: John S. Robertson
- Written by: Josephine Lovett (screenplay); Marian Ainslee (titles); Ruth Cummings (titles)
- Starring: Lillian Gish; Norman Kerry
- Cinematography: Oliver T. Marsh
- Music by: William Axt; David Mendoza
- Distributed by: Metro-Goldwyn-Mayer
- Release date: May 11, 1927
- Running time: 90 minutes
- Country: United States
- Language: Silent (English intertitles)

Annie Laurie (1927) by John S. Robertson

Annie Laurie is a 1927 American silent romantic drama film directed by John S. Robertson, released by Metro-Goldwyn-Mayer, and starring Lillian Gish and Norman Kerry. It is about the battles of Scottish clans.

This was the third film of Lillian Gish at MGM, and its poor box office returns marked a decline in the star's career. On a down note Gish stated that her mother became ill during the production of this film and that "...she only showed up for work" as opposed to putting her all into the film. John Wayne makes an early film appearance as a crowd extra.

The film's copyright was not renewed, and fell into the public domain on January 1, 2023.

On January 8, 2024, Turner Classic Movies launched the world premiere of the Library of Congress restoration of Annie Laurie, with a new score by Robert Israel.

== Cast ==
- Lillian Gish as Annie Laurie
- Norman Kerry as Ian Macdonald
- Creighton Hale as Donald Campbell
- Joseph Striker as Alastair Macdonald
- Hobart Bosworth as The MacDonald Chieftain
- Patricia Avery as Enid Campbell
- Russell Simpson as Sandy
- Brandon Hurst as The Campbell Chieftain
- David Torrence as Sir Robert Laurie
- Frank Currier as Cameron of Lochiel
- Richard Alexander as One of the MacDonalds (uncredited)
- Mary Gordon as First Midwife (uncredited)
- Henry Kolker as King's Representative (uncredited)
- Margaret Mann as Second Midwife (uncredited)
- John Wayne as Extra (uncredited)

== See also ==
- List of early color feature films
