= William Daniels (cinematographer) =

American cinematographer

William H. Daniels ASC
- Promotional portrait
- Born: William H. Daniels; December 1, 1901; Cleveland, Ohio, U.S.
- Died: June 14, 1970 (aged 68); Los Angeles, California, U.S.
- Resting place: Forest Lawn Memorial Park Cemetery, Glendale, California, U.S.
- Occupation: Cinematographer
- Years active: 1919–1970
- Spouse: Betty Lee Gaston (1903-1985)
- Children: 3

William H. Daniels ASC (December 1, 1901 – June 14, 1970) was a film cinematographer who was best-known as actress Greta Garbo's personal lensman. Daniels served as the cinematographer on all but three of Garbo's films during her tenure at Metro-Goldwyn-Mayer, including Torrent (1926), The Mysterious Lady (1928), The Kiss (1929), Anna Christie (1930), Grand Hotel (1932), Queen Christina (1933), Anna Karenina (1935), Camille (1936) and Ninotchka (1939). Early in his career, Daniels worked regularly with director Erich von Stroheim, providing cinematography for such films as The Devil's Pass Key (1920) and Greed (1924). Daniels went on to win an Academy Award for Best Cinematography for his work on The Naked City (1948).

== Early years ==
Daniels was born in Cleveland, Ohio, in 1901. He completed his higher education at the University of Southern California (USC).

== Career ==
His career as a cinematographer extended fifty years from the silent film Foolish Wives (1922) to Move (1970), although he was an uncredited camera operator on two earlier films (1919 and 1920). His major films included The Naked City (1948), filmed on the streets of New York, for which he won an Academy Award for Best Cinematography. He also was associate producer of a few films in the 1960s and was President of American Society of Cinematographers (1961–63).

=== Erich von Stroheim: 1919-1925 ===
Daniels on Merry-Go-Round (1923): “In the big banquet scene, Stroheim had all the extras playing Austrian officers really drunk; he served real champagne by the bucketful and whiskey as well. A girl stepped naked out of a punchbowl…Merry-Go-Round was a disaster for Stroheim.”

By 1918 he was promoted to a first camera operator at Universal Pictures. There he initially worked in an uncredited capacity, including the shooting of Erich von Stroheim’s debut film, Blind Husbands (1919).

Daniels provided the photography for director von Stroheim’s most iconic Metro-Goldwyn-Mayer productions of the 1920s, among them Foolish Wives (1922), Greed (1925), and The Merry Widow (1925).

Von Stroheim’s Greed involved six weeks of shooting in Death Valley in July and August 1925, with the entire cast and crew on site. Daniel endured the heat and lack of amenities without complaint. Photographically, his greatest challenge shooting Greed was integrating transitions from natural outdoor lighting with illuminated interiors that von Stroheim demanded in the famous marriage sequence shot in San Francisco: “[B]alancing the exposure was hell” Daniels recalled. He registered dismay with the director’s obsession for “realism” requiring that an underground mining sequence be shot in an actual shaft at a depth 3000 feet (915 meters), rather than near the surface, either of which would have produced the same visual effect. Daniels ended his association with von Stroheim after completing The Merry Widow in 1925.

=== Greta Garbo: 1925-1939 ===
When the 19-year-old Swedish actress Greta Garbo first arrived under contract at MGM studios in 1924, Daniels was enlisted to conduct her screen tests, specifically close-ups. He recalled that “she didn't speak a word of English and was terrifically shy.” After completing this essential, but painstaking “ordeal,” Daniels insisted that Garbo would henceforth work exclusively on closed sets (director and crew only present), in an effort to ease the young actresses “constant stage fright” and allowing her to focus on performing.

Daniels acted as cinematographer on 16 pictures starring Garbo, the first The Temptress (1926) and the last Ninotchka (1939) film).

In the famous sequence in Queen Christina (1933), in which Garbo “memorizes” the features of the bedroom where she has had sex with Antonio (John Gilbert), Daniels credits von Stroheim’s influence for its success: “I think I learned the realism in this scene, the way of achieving it, from von Stroheim.” he died in Los Angeles in 1970

== Filmography ==
- The Devil's Pass Key (1920)
- Foolish Wives (1922)
- Merry-Go-Round (1923)
- Helen's Babies (1924)
- Greed (1924)
- Women and Gold (1925)
- The Merry Widow (1925)
- Dance Madness (1925)
- Torrent (1926)
- The Boob (1926)
- Monte Carlo (1926)
- Money Talks (1926)
- Bardelys the Magnificent (1926)
- The Temptress (1926)
- Altars of Desire (1926)
- Flesh and the Devil (1926)
- Captain Salvation (1927)
- Tillie the Toiler (1927)
- On Ze Boulevard (1927)
- Love (1927)
- The Latest from Paris (1928)
- Bringing Up Father (1928)
- The Actress (1928)
- Telling the World (1928)
- The Mysterious Lady (1928)
- A Woman of Affairs (1928)
- Dream of Love (1928)
- A Lady of Chance (1928)
- Wild Orchids (1928)
- Queen Kelly (1928)
- The Trial of Mary Dugan (1929)
- The Last of Mrs. Cheyney (1929)
- Wise Girls/Kempy (1929)
- The Kiss (1929)
- Their Own Desire (1929)
- Anna Christie (1930)
- Montana Moon (1930)
- Strictly Unconventional (1930)
- Le spectre vert (1930)
- Romance (1930)
- If the Emperor Only Knew That (1930)
- Olympia (1930)
- The Great Meadow (1930)
- Inspiration (1930)
- A Free Soul (1931)
- Susan Lenox (Her Fall and Rise) (1931)
- Mata Hari (1931)
- Lovers Courageous (1931)
- Grand Hotel (1931)
- As You Desire Me (1932)
- Skyscraper Souls (1932)
- Rasputin and the Empress (1932)
- The White Sister (1933)
- The Stranger's Return (1933)
- Dinner at Eight (1933)
- Broadway to Hollywood/Ring Up the Curtain (1933)
- Christopher Bean (1933)
- Queen Christina (1933)
- The Barretts of Wimpole Street (1934)
- The Painted Veil (1934)
- Naughty Marietta (1934)
- Anna Karenina (1935)
- I Live My Life (1935)
- Rendezvous (1935)
- Camille (1936)
- Romeo and Juliet (1936)
- Rose Marie (1936)
- Personal Property (1937)
- Broadway Melody of 1938 (1937)
- Double Wedding (1937)
- The Last Gangster (1937)
- Beg, Borrow or Steal (1937)
- Marie Antoinette (1938)
- The Shopworn Angel (1938)
- Three Loves Has Nancy (1938)
- Dramatic School (1938)
- Idiot's Delight (1938)
- Stronger Than Desire (1939)
- Ninotchka (1939)
- Another Thin Man (1939)
- The Shop Around the Corner (1940)
- The Mortal Storm (1940)
- New Moon (1940)
- So Ends Our Night (1940)
- Back Street (1940)
- Love Crazy (1941)
- They Met in Bombay (1941)
- Honky Tonk (1941)
- Shadow of the Thin Man (1941)
- Design for Scandal (1941)
- Dr. Kildare's Victory (1941)
- For Me and My Gal (1942)
- Keeper of the Flame (1942)
- Girl Crazy (1943)
- The Heavenly Body (1943)
- The Canterville Ghost (1943)
- Maisie Goes to Reno (1944)
- Sure Cures (1946)
- Lured (1947) (aka Personal Column)
- Diamond Demon (1947)
- Brute Force (1947)
- The Naked City (1948)
- For the Love of Mary (1948)
- Family Honeymoon (1948)
- The Life of Riley (1949)
- Illegal Entry (1949)
- The Gal Who Took the West (1949)
- Abandoned (1949)
- Three Came Home (1949)
- Woman in Hiding (1950)
- Winchester '73 (1950)
- Deported (1950)
- Harvey (1950)
- Thunder on the Hill (1950)
- Bright Victory (1951)
- The Lady Pays Off (1951)
- Never Wave at a WAC (1951)
- Glory Alley (1951)
- Pat and Mike (1952)
- Plymouth Adventure (1952)
- Thunder Bay (1952)
- When in Rome (1952)
- The Glenn Miller Story (1953)
- The Far Country (1953)
- War Arrow (1953)
- Forbidden (1953)
- Strategic Air Command (1954)
- Six Bridges to Cross (1954)
- The Shrike (1955)
- Foxfire (1955)
- The Girl Rush (1955)
- The Benny Goodman Story (1955)
- Away All Boats (1956)
- The Unguarded Moment (1956)
- Istanbul (1956)
- Interlude (1956)
- Night Passage (1956)
- My Man Godfrey (1957)
- Voice in the Mirror (1958)
- Cat on a Hot Tin Roof (1958)
- Some Came Running (1958)
- A Stranger in My Arms (1958)
- A Hole in the Head (1958)
- Never So Few (1959)
- Can-Can (1960)
- Ocean's 11 (1960)
- All the Fine Young Cannibals (1960)
- Come September (1961)
- How the West Was Won (1962)
- Billy Rose's Jumbo (1962)
- Dokonjo monogatari - zeni no odori (1963) [with Kazuo Miyagawa]
- Come Blow Your Horn (1963)
- The Prize (1963)
- Robin and the 7 Hoods (1964) [also associate producer]
- None but the Brave (1965) [with Harold Lipstein; also associate producer]
- Von Ryan's Express (1965)
- Marriage on the Rocks (1965)
- Assault on a Queen (1966)
- In Like Flint (1966)
- Valley of the Dolls (1967)
- The Impossible Years (1968)
- Marlowe (1968)
- The Maltese Bippy (1969)
- Move (1970)

== Accolades ==
Wins

- Academy Awards: Oscar, Best Cinematography, Black-and-White, for The Naked City; 1949.

Nominated

- Academy Awards: Oscar, Best Cinematography, for Anna Christie; 1930.
- Academy Awards: Oscar, Best Cinematography, Color, for Cat on a Hot Tin Roof; 1959.
- Academy Awards: Oscar, Best Cinematography, Color, How the West Was Won (1962); shared with: Milton Krasner, Charles Lang, Joseph LaShelle; 1964.
