= Without Benefit of Clergy =

1921 film

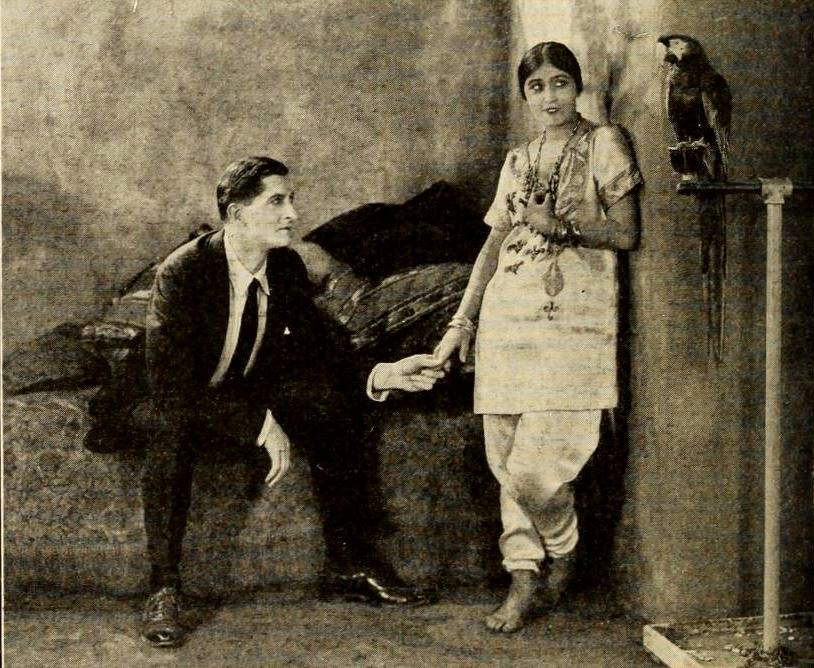
- Film still with Thomas Holding and Virginia Brown Faire
- Directed by: James Young
- Written by: Randolph C. Lewis
- Based on: Without Benefit of Clergy by Rudyard Kipling
- Produced by: Robert Brunton
- Starring: Nigel De Brulier; Virginia Brown Faire; Boris Karloff; Thomas Holding
- Cinematography: Jack Okey
- Production company: Robert Brunton Productions
- Distributed by: Pathé Exchange
- Release date: June 26, 1921
- Running time: 6 reels (1 hour)
- Country: United States
- Language: Silent (English intertitles)

Without Benefit of Clergy is a 1921 American silent drama film directed by James Young and featuring Virginia Brown Faire, Thomas Holding and Boris Karloff. It is based on the story by Rudyard Kipling. A print of the film still exists at the UCLA Film and Television Archives and at Archives Du Film Du CNC (Bois D'Arcy/Paris).

== Plot ==
Holden, a young English engineer in India, falls in love with the native girl Ameera, so he buys her from her mother. Their marital union violates the strict social structure they live in. They live together very happily until their baby son dies. Later, Ameera dies during a cholera epidemic. The film's tagline was "The deathless drama of Ameera, the Hindu girl, and the British engineer, whose "love need no caste." (Print Ad in the Sunday Chronicle, ((Paterson, NJ)) 4 September 1921)

== Cast ==
- Virginia Brown Faire as Ameera
- Thomas Holding as Holden, an American engineer in India
- Evelyn Selbie as Ameera's mother
- Boris Karloff as Ahmed Khan
- Ruth Cummings as Alice Sanders (credited as Ruth Sinclair)
- Nigel De Brulier as Pir Khan
- Percy Marmont
- Philippe De Lacy as Tota, at age 5 (uncredited)
- Otto Lederer as Ahghan the moneylender (uncredited)
- Herbert Prior as Hugh Sanders (uncredited)
- E. G. Miller as Michael Revenish

== See also ==
- Boris Karloff filmography
