= Thunder Below =

1932 film

- Directed by: Richard Wallace
- Screenplay by: Sidney Buchman; Josephine Lovett
- Starring: Tallulah Bankhead; Charles Bickford; Paul Lukas; Eugene Pallette; Ralph Forbes; Leslie Fenton
- Cinematography: Charles Lang
- Music by: Sigmund Krumgold; Stephan Pasternacki
- Production company: Paramount Pictures
- Distributed by: Paramount Pictures
- Release date: June 17, 1932
- Running time: 67 minutes
- Country: United States
- Language: English

Thunder Below is a 1932 American pre-Code drama film directed by Richard Wallace, written by Sidney Buchman and Josephine Lovett, and starring Tallulah Bankhead, Charles Bickford, Paul Lukas, Eugene Pallette, Ralph Forbes and Leslie Fenton. It was released on June 17, 1932, by Paramount Pictures.

Bankhead later said "For all Wallace’s divinity, for all my vitality, Thunder Below was a double-jointed dud, maudlin and messy."

== Plot ==
This is the story of an unhappy wife of oil rigger who labors in a Central American oil field.

The bored Susan falls in love with Walt's good friend Ken but keeps her husband in the dark about her feelings, until he is plunged into darkness for real when he loses his eyesight.

Susan finds her attentions then wandering yet another man, Davis, and Ken urges her to return to Walt.

== Cast ==
- Tallulah Bankhead as Susan
- Charles Bickford as Walt
- Paul Lukas as Ken
- Eugene Pallette as Bill Horner
- Ralph Forbes as Davis
- Leslie Fenton as Webb
- James Finlayson as Scotty
- Mona Rico as Pajarita (uncredited)
