= The Kiss (1929 film) =

1929 film

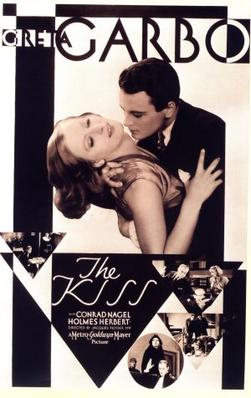
- Theatrical release poster
- Directed by: Jacques Feyder
- Screenplay by: Hanns Kräly
- Story by: George M. Saville
- Produced by: Irving Thalberg Albert Lewin
- Starring: Greta Garbo; Conrad Nagel; Lew Ayres
- Cinematography: William Daniels
- Edited by: Ben Lewis
- Music by: William Axt (uncredited)
- Production company: Metro-Goldwyn-Mayer
- Distributed by: Metro-Goldwyn-Mayer
- Release date: November 16, 1929
- Running time: 62–65 minutes
- Country: United States
- Languages: Sound (Synchronized); English Intertitles
- Budget: US$ 257,000

The Kiss is a 1929 American synchronized sound drama film directed by Jacques Feyder, starring Greta Garbo, Conrad Nagel, and Lew Ayres in his first feature film. The film has no audible dialogue but featured a synchronized musical score and sound effects. The soundtrack was recorded using the Western Electric Sound System sound-on-film process. The soundtrack was also transferred to discs for those theatres that were wired with sound-on-disc sound systems.

The film, which is based on a short story by George M. Saville, The Kiss, bears the same title as the 1896 short that "shocked" the American public by being the first motion picture to depict a couple kissing. This 1929 production is notable for being the last major film released by Metro-Goldwyn-Mayer (MGM) without dialogue and the final non-speaking performances by both Garbo and Conrad Nagel.

== Plot ==
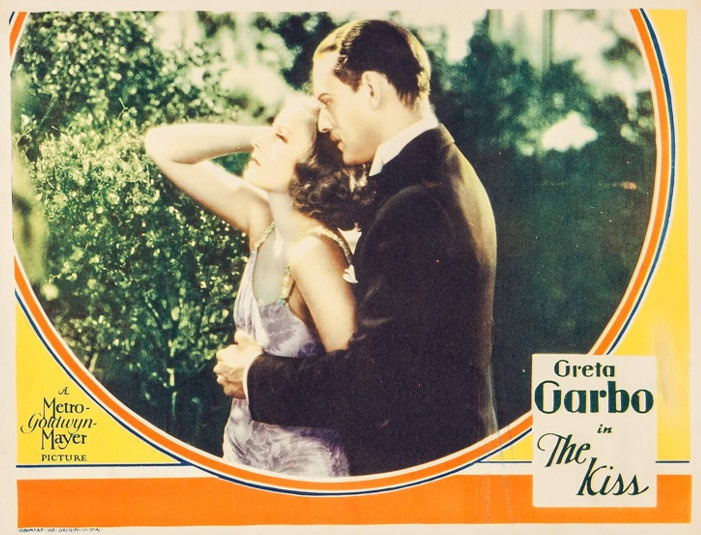
Lobby card

The Kiss (full film)

The story begins inside the Museum of Fine Arts of Lyon, France. Two lovers – Irene Guarry (Greta Garbo) and André Dubail (Conrad Nagel) – feign interest in artwork as they discuss their clandestine romance. Irene is a young woman unhappily married to Charles Guarry (Anders Randolf), a wealthy, much older businessman, whose company teeters near bankruptcy. André is a successful lawyer, unmarried, close to Irene's age, and determined to face Charles and profess his love for Irene. Despite being trapped in a loveless marriage, Irene fears her husband's violent temper and his reaction if André were to confront him. "He's madly jealous," she tells André, and insists that her marriage situation is hopelessly bound by "convention ... to a man I don't love." After she and André kiss, she leaves the museum, determined never to see her true love again.

Back home, Irene's suspicious husband reviews her daily activities through a private investigator he hired to follow her. The investigator only reports that she went to a local dog show and had an innocent encounter with Pierre Lassalle (Lew Ayres), the 18-year-old son of one of Charles' business associates. Later, Irene and Charles attend a large formal dinner party. She is surprised to see André, who arrives alone and sits at the dinner table across from Irene's sullen husband. Young Pierre is at the party too, and his father informs Irene that his college-bound boy is "quite mad" about her. André and Irene do manage to meet briefly in a nearby garden, where André tells her he is moving to Paris and came to the party to see her one last time. They again express their love, kiss passionately and part, both resolved that their affair has ended. Irene then returns to the party to dance with lovestruck Pierre.

The following day, after a tennis match at his parents' estate, Pierre confesses his love to Irene while Charles meets with Pierre's father to discuss his failing business and need for money. Irene is touched by Pierre's confession but makes light of his ardor, referring to him as "only a young boy". She agrees, however, to give him a photograph of herself that he can take to college. The following evening, Pierre visits Irene's home to get the promised photo, and as he leaves he requests a small goodbye kiss. Irene hesitates but gives him a short kiss, which incites Pierre to grab her and press for a more intense one. Returning home, Charles sees their follow-up kiss, storms into the room, and begins to beat Pierre mercilessly. As her husband pursues the college boy into another room, Irene pleads with him to stop his assault, but he continues to batter Pierre. The room's door closes; a muffled gunshot is heard. Charles dies.

Irene killed her husband to save Pierre, but before authorities are summoned, she alters the scene and timeline of the crime. To protect Pierre's reputation and herself, she tells the police her depressed husband committed suicide due to his dire finances. Investigators doubt her story and Irene is indicted for murder, prompting André to return to Lyon to defend his ex-lover. During the trial she repeatedly assures André that her husband killed himself. Courtroom testimony by Pierre's father about Charles' impending bankruptcy and "utter despair", along with André's heartfelt declarations of Irene's innocence, convince the jury to acquit her. In the court area after the verdict, a smug Pierre tells Irene that her love for him compelled her to kill Charles, but he quickly realizes that André is her true love. Guilt-ridden for lying to André, Irene divulges the truth to him. Stunned, he sits and cradles his head in his hands, quietly reassessing his feelings. Believing she has destroyed her relationship with André, Irene is relieved when he finally stands and reaffirms his love for her. The film ends with them kissing just as three old cleaning women enter the room and announce they "have come to clean the court".

== Cast ==
- Greta Garbo as Irene Guarry
- Conrad Nagel as André Dubail
- Holmes Herbert as Lassalle
- Anders Randolf as Charles Guarry
- Lew Ayres as Pierre Lassalle
- George Davis as Durant, a private investigator
- André Cheron as the prosecutor (uncredited)

== Music ==
The film featured a theme song entitled "Romeo and Juliet (Love Theme)" which was composed by Pyotr Ilyich Tchaikovsky. It also featured repeated replays of the Liebestod theme from Richard Wagner's Tristan und Isolde whenever the action of the film became particularly dramatic.

== Production ==
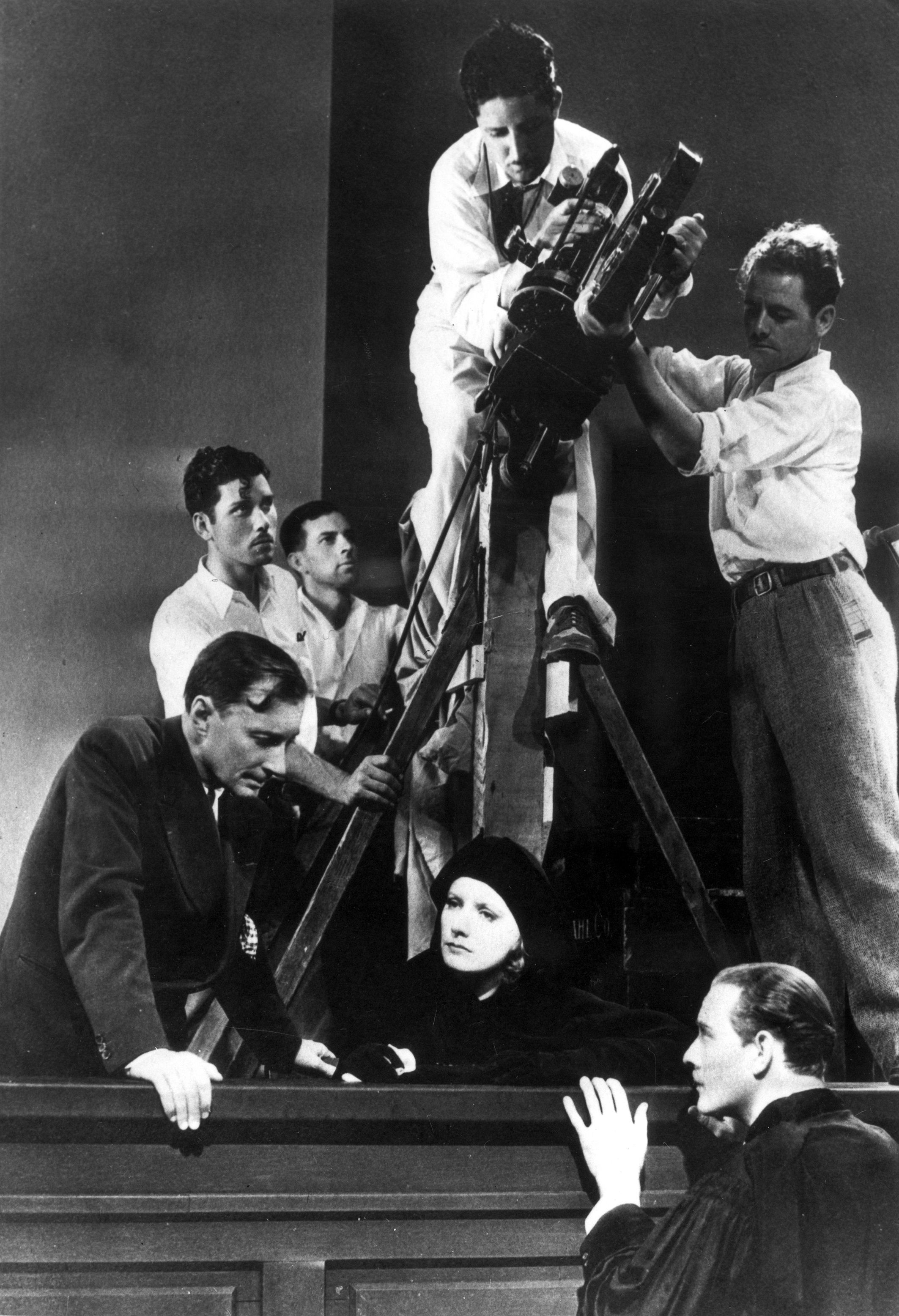
Greta Garbo with director Jacques Feyder during filming of The Kiss.

- During casting for The Kiss, Garbo recommended Nils Asther for the role as her lover André. Asther had been born in Denmark but, like Garbo, had grown up in Sweden, an association with the actress that only enhanced his reputation as "the male Greta Garbo" in the film industry and among movie fans. In addition, he had already costarred with her in two of MGM's recent film successes and was still under contract with the studio. Nevertheless, despite those apparent advantages held by Asther and Garbo's strong support for him to join the cast, the part was assigned to Conrad Nagel.
- By early September 1929, The Kiss was already being filmed at MGM, although the studio had yet to announce publicly a title for the production. According to the trade paper The Film Daily, a dozen feature films were simultaneously under way at that time at MGM. All but one were "talkers". "The only silent picture being filmed", reported The Film Daily, "is Greta Garbo’s new untitled European romance now being directed by Jacques Feyder".
- The visually striking Art Déco interior sets in The Kiss were designed by legendary MGM art director and production designer Cedric Gibbons. Gibbons' bold, high-fashion sets in the film were intended to emphasize the French style and serve as "vital elements" in the production, especially in a non-dialog offering like The Kiss, which had to compete at its release with many other motion pictures that featured the new "exciting" element of recorded dialog.

== Reception ==
Most film critics gave very positive reviews of The Kiss in 1929, a year in which American motion pictures were continuing their transition from the last major silent productions to the release of more sound films. Variety alluded to that transition in its 1929 review of The Kiss, contending that the film would have likely suffered in quality if it had been released with recorded dialog.

The film grossed $518,000 in the United States and $387,000 elsewhere, bringing its worldwide gross to $905,000; the profit for the film was $448,000.

The publication felt that both Garbo's performance and her physical appearance in the film were actually enhanced by its non-talking format:

The Kiss, with an unusual taste exhibited in casting and direction, is entertainment of the holding kind. And it is one of Miss Garbo's best, without stretching the elastic of kindness. Though this is silent it may be stronger that way than with dialog ... Few actresses could weather the series of close-ups required of Miss Garbo in this one. In each she registers an individual perfection. The series proves her biggest asset is her naturalness.

Film critic Mordaunt Hall of The New York Times referred to the presence of The Kiss among all the new talking pictures in late 1929 as "Golden silence" and a demonstration of Fedyer's "consummate artistry" with a non-talker. "Miss Garbo", observed Hall, "once again reveals her extraordinary talent for screen acting, and under M. Fedyer's guidance she is if anything more impressive than she has been in other films." The Film Daily—widely read by studio personnel and theater owners—also described Garbo as "very alluring" and "exotic" in The Kiss; but that paper found the "sophisticated drama" lacking, especially the film's conclusion. "The subject matter", wrote The Film Daily, "is too tragic, and the ending not the type that the average fan looks for."

Released less than 4 months after the disastrous crash of the American stock market in 1929, The Kiss was not expected to do well financially by attracting sizeable crowds of filmgoers in that highly unstable economic time. The film, though, surprised studio executives by making a significant profit and becoming Garbo's second most successful picture, ranking only behind Flesh and the Devil with John Gilbert, which had been released three years earlier. In Atlanta, Georgia, for example, it was reported that during Thanksgiving week The Kiss "broke all existing house records for receipts at Loew's Capitol [Theatre]".

== See also ==
- List of early sound feature films (1926–1929)
