= Nils Asther =

Swedish actor (1897–1981)

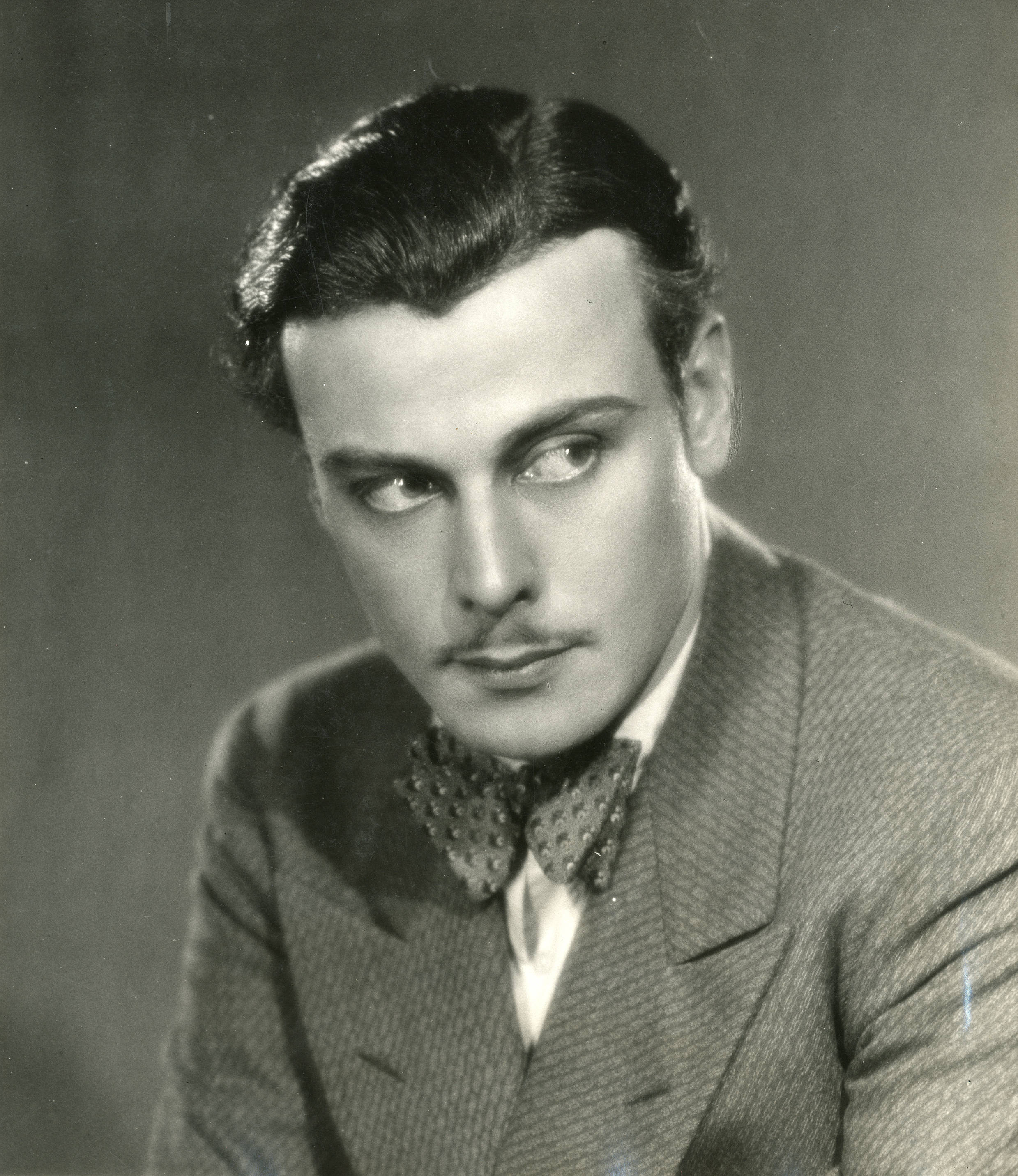
- Asther in 1928
- Born: Nils Anton Alfhild Asther; 17 January 1897; Copenhagen, Denmark
- Died: 19 October 1981 (aged 84); Stockholm, Sweden
- Occupations: Actor, painter
- Years active: 1916–1963
- Spouse: Vivian Duncan (m. 1930; div. 1932)
- Children: 1

Nils Anton Alfhild Asther (17 January 1897 – 19 October 1981) was a Swedish actor active in Hollywood from 1926 to the mid-1950s, known as "the male Greta Garbo". Between 1916 and 1963, he appeared in over seventy feature films, sixteen of which were produced in the silent era. He is mainly remembered today for two silent films, The Single Standard and Wild Orchids, which he made with fellow Swede Greta Garbo, and his portrayal of the title character in the controversial pre-Code Frank Capra film, The Bitter Tea of General Yen.

== Biography ==
Born Nils Anton Alfhild Asther, he was the son of Swedish nationals Anton Andersson Asther (born February 21, 1865, Caroli, Malmö) and Hildegard Augusta Åkerlund (born November 3, 1869, in Södra Sallerup, Malmöhus County). Although Asther had promised Åkerlund marriage, she was unwed on giving birth to Nils in the Sankt Matthæus Parish of the Copenhagen borough of Vesterbro where she very briefly stayed. Thus, due to the marriage already being promised, Nils was technically not illegitimate; when his parents married on May 29, 1898, it was noted Anton officially acknowledged the boy as his.

He spent his first year as a foster child in Hyllie, Sweden with saddlemaker Rasmus Hellström and wife Emilia Kristina Möller. He was christened there on February 26, 1897, before being returned to his biological parents who then wed in Malmö.

His older half-brother, Gunnar Anton Asther (born March 4, 1892, in Caroli, Malmö) was his father's child from a previous marriage to Anna Paulina Olander, who died in July 1895.

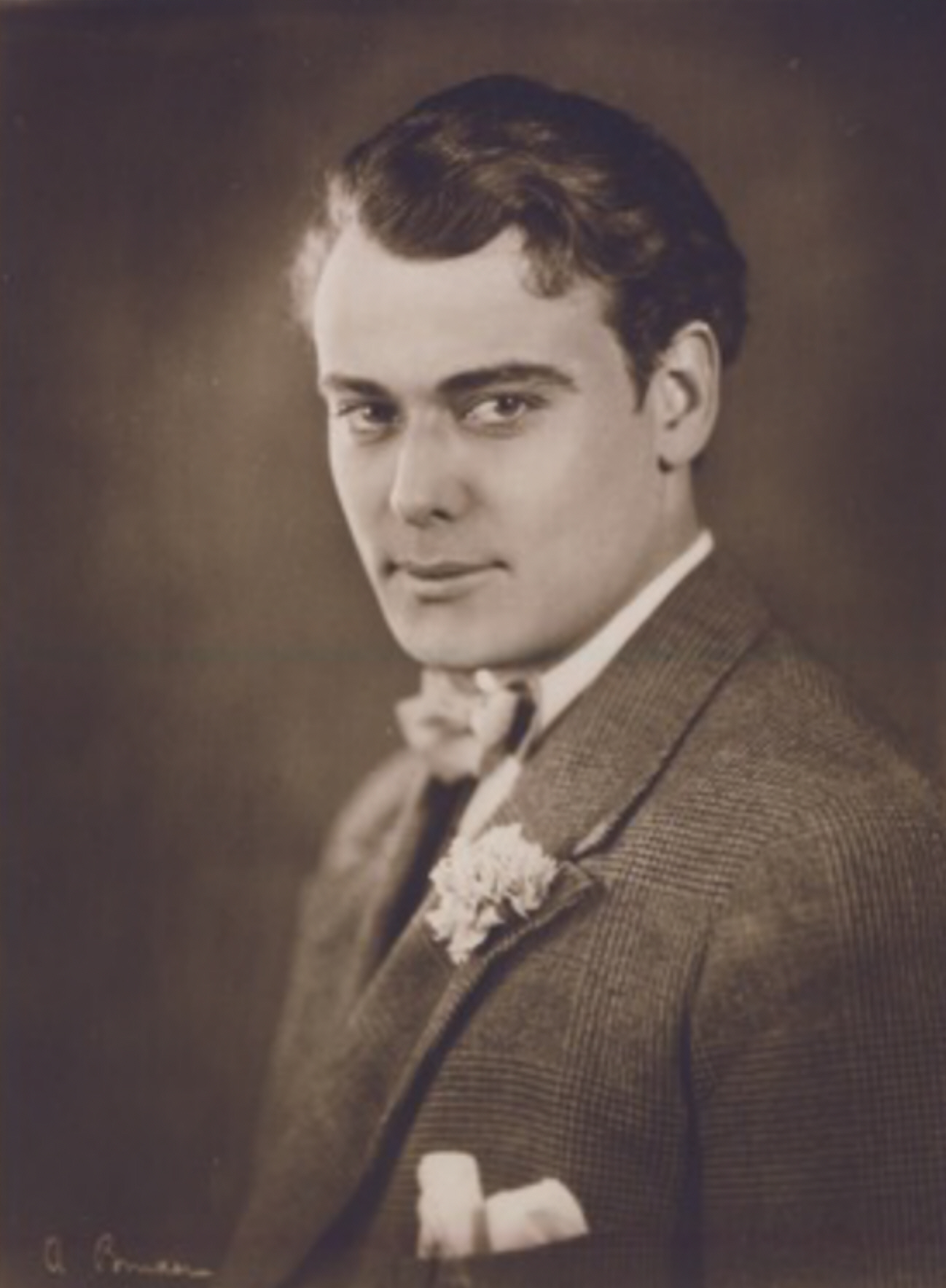
Photo by Alexander Binder in 1925

As a young man, Asther moved to Stockholm, where he received acting lessons from Augusta Lindberg. It was through Lindberg that Asther received his first theatrical engagement at Lorensbergsteatern in Gothenburg, and in 1916 Mauritz Stiller cast him in The Wings (Swedish: Vingarna), a 1916 gay-themed Swedish silent film directed by Mauritz Stiller, based on Herman Bang's 1902 novel Mikaël. In Copenhagen, actor Aage Hertel of the Royal Danish Theatre took Asther under his wing. This soon led to a number of film roles in Sweden, Denmark and Germany between 1918 and 1926.

=== Hollywood ===
In 1927, Asther left for Hollywood, where his first film was Topsy and Eva. By 1928 his good looks had made him into a leading man, playing opposite such stars as Pola Negri, Marion Davies and Joan Crawford. He grew a thin mustache which amplified his suave appearance. One of his most popular films was Our Dancing Daughters, starring Joan Crawford, Johnny Mack Brown, Anita Page, and Dorothy Sebastian. Asther was cast opposite Greta Garbo in Wild Orchids as the tempting Javanese Prince De Gace. With the arrival of sound in movies, Asther took diction and voice lessons to minimize his accent, and was generally cast in roles where an accent was not a problem, such as the Chinese General Yen in The Bitter Tea of General Yen.

=== Career decline ===
Between 1935 and 1940, Asther was forced to work in England after an alleged breach of contract led to a studio-based blacklist. Asther made six films there. He returned to Hollywood in 1940, and although he made another 19 films up until 1949, his career was never the same, and he appeared mostly in small supporting roles. In the early 1950s, Asther tried to restart his career in television, but managed only to secure roles in a few episodes of minor TV series. In 1958, he returned to Sweden, almost destitute. There, he managed to get an engagement with a local theater and had four film roles before finally giving up on acting in 1963 and devoting his time to painting.

== Homosexuality ==
Asther was a homosexual in a time when it was a dangerous social stigma, both personally and professionally. He grew up in a deeply religious Lutheran home, believing homosexuality was a sin as society viewed homosexuality as a disease. In Sweden, it was called "unnatural fornication". While sexual same-sex relations between adults were legalized in 1944, the Swedish medical classification of homosexuality as a mental disorder continued until 1979.

The theatrical community and the film industry of the 1920s accepted gay actors with little reservation, always provided they remain discreet about their sexual orientation and there was no public suggestion of impropriety. Asther was closeted, and proposed marriage to Greta Garbo to hide his true sexual orientation. Asther and Garbo had known each other in Sweden, and finding themselves relatively new to a foreign land, they spent a great deal of time together. They often visited a friend's ranch outside Hollywood where they could relax, ride horses, go climbing, or swim at Lake Arrowhead. "Sailor" was a favored term for Garbo's male, gay, and bisexual friends. In 1929, during filming with Asther on location at Santa Catalina Island for The Single Standard, she was overheard berating him for grabbing her so roughly: "I'm not one of your sailors."

Rumors swirled in the early 1930s that Asther had relationships with fellow Swedes, director Mauritz Stiller and the writer Hjalmar Bergman, among other male colleagues. Asther mentions some of this in his memoirs. He had a long-term relationship with actor/stuntman and World War II Navy sailor Ken DuMain. According to DuMain, he met Asther on Hollywood Boulevard in the early 1940s, and they enjoyed a long-term relationship.

In August 1930, Asther entered a lavender marriage with Vivian Duncan, one of his Topsy and Eva co-stars. They had one child, Evelyn Asther Duncan, dubbed by the media as "The International Baby" due to her Swedish father, American mother, and Bavarian birth. This made Evelyn’s nationality debatable, so Asther offered to apply for American citizenship if it would help the process of getting her into the United States. Asther and Duncan's marriage proved stormy from the start, and became tabloid fodder; they divorced in 1932.

== Memoirs ==
Asther's posthumously published memoir in Swedish had a foreword by theatre historian Uno "Myggan" Ericson, who had met Asther only once in 1958 on arriving in Gothenburg. The afterword was by Iwo Wiklander. The middle of the book, written by Asther himself, covers the years between his birth and return to Sweden in 1958. Wiklander claimed in later interviews that Asther was intent on erasing parts of his life before his death, and that much material in the autobiography was exaggerated or completely fictitious to make a more interesting story. Countess Linde Klinckowström-von Rosen claimed their "engagement" was a practical joke while filming together. She did, however, introduce Asther to her family, and to the Swedish painter Nils Dardel and his freethinking artistic circle.

== Death and legacy ==
Nils Asther died on October 13, 1981, aged 84, at a hospital in Farsta, Stockholm. He is buried in Hotagen, Jämtland.

In 1960, Asther was inducted into the Hollywood Walk of Fame with a motion pictures star at 6705 Hollywood Boulevard for his contributions to the film industry.

== Selected filmography ==
- The Wings (1916) – Aspiring actor
- Hittebarnet (1917, Short) – Kurt
- Retten sejrer (1918)
- A Trip to Mars (1918) – Wounded Martian Citizen (uncredited)
- Solen der dræbte (1918) – Jan
- Gyurkovicsarna (1920) – Bandi Gyurkovics
- Vem dömer (1922) – Apprentice
- The Secret of the Duchess (1923)
- Norrtullsligan (1923) – Baby's Fiancé
- Charles XII's Courier (1924) – Stanislaus
- Wienerbarnet (1924) – Charles Dupont
- Letters Which Never Reached Him (1925)
- Love's Finale (1925) – Dr. Gaston Lasar
- Her Husband's Wife (1926)
- Three Cuckoo Clocks (1926) – Reginald Ellis
- The Golden Butterfly (1926) – Andy, sein Sohn
- Das süße Mädel (1926) – The Prince's Son
- Wrath of the Seas (1926) – Torpedooffizier Günther Adenried
- The Man with the Counterfeit Money (1927)
- Gauner im Frack (1927) – George Valeska
- Hotelratten (1927) – Fürst Ladrone
- Topsy and Eva (1927) – George Shelby
- Sorrell and Son (1927) – Christopher 'Kit' Sorrell
- The Blue Danube (1928) – Erich von Statzen
- Laugh, Clown, Laugh (1928) – Luigi
- The Cossacks (1928) – Prince Olenin Stieshneff
- Loves of an Actress (1928) – Raoul
- The Cardboard Lover (1928) – Andre
- Our Dancing Daughters (1928) – Norman
- Dream of Love (1928) – Prince Maurice de Saxe
- Wild Orchids (1929) – Prince De Gace
- The Hollywood Revue of 1929 (1929) – Nils Asther (scenes deleted)
- The Single Standard (1929) – Packy Cannon
- The Sea Bat (1930) – Carl
- But the Flesh Is Weak (1932) – Prince Paul
- Letty Lynton (1932) – Emile Renaul
- The Washington Masquerade (1932) – Brenner
- The Bitter Tea of General Yen (1932) – Gen. Yen
- Storm at Daybreak (1933) – Captain Geza Petery
- The Right to Romance (1933) – Dr. Helmuth Heppling
- If I Were Free (1933) – Tono Cazenove
- By Candlelight (1933) – Prince Alfred von Rommer
- Madame Spy (1934) – Captain Franck
- The Crime Doctor (1934) – Gary Patten
- The Love Captive (1934) – Dr. Alexis Collender
- Love Time (1934) – Franz Schubert
- Abdul the Damned (1935) – Chief of Police Kadar-Pasha
- The Prisoner of Corbal (1936) – Varennes
- Guilty Melody (1936) – Galloni
- Make-Up (1937) – Bux
- Tea Leaves in the Wind (1938) – Tony Drake
- The Man Who Lost Himself (1941) – Peter Ransome
- Forced Landing (1941) – Colonel Jan Golas
- Dr. Kildare's Wedding Day (1941) – Constanzo Labardi
- Flying Blind (1941) – Eric Karolek
- The Night of January 16th (1941) – Bjorn Faulkner
- The Night Before the Divorce (1942) – Victor Roselle
- Sweater Girl (1942) – Prof. Henri Menard
- Night Monster (1942) – Agor Singh
- Submarine Alert (1943) – Dr. Arthur Huneker
- Mystery Broadcast (1943) – Ricky Moreno
- The Hour Before the Dawn (1944) – Kurt van der Breughel
- Bluebeard (1944) – Inspector Jacques Lefevre
- Alaska (1944) – Thomas Leroux
- The Man in Half Moon Street (1945) – Dr. Julian Karell
- Son of Lassie (1945) – Olav
- Jealousy (1945) – Peter Urban
- Love, Honor and Goodbye (1945) – Tony Linnard
- The Feathered Serpent (1948) – Prof. Paul Evans
- Samson and Delilah (1949) – Prince (uncredited)
- That Man from Tangier (1953) – Henri
- When Darkness Falls (1960) – Tord Ekstedt, Vicar
- Svenska Floyd (1961) – Vincent Mitella
- The Lady in White (1962) – Simon Ek
- Suddenly, a Woman! (1963) – Londonchefen (final film role)

== On soundtracks ==
- Dr. Kildare's Wedding Day (1941) as uncredited performer: "Ride of the Valkyries" and "Tableau Russe"" (Symphonic Suite Composed by Lionel Barrymore)
- Storm at Daybreak (1933) as performer: "Roses from the South"

== Selected stage ==
- The Importance of Being Earnest; director: Gustaf Linden, premiere: 1923-02-27, Royal Dramatic Theatre, Stockholm
- The Admirable Crichton; director: Karl Hedberg, premiere: 1923-10-12 Royal Dramatic Theatre, Stockholm
- Othello; director: Olof Molander, premiere: 1924-02-08 Royal Dramatic Theatre, Stockholm
- The Strong Are Lonely; director: Margaret Webster, premiere: 1924-09-29 Broadhurst Theatre, New York
