= Wild Orchids (film) =

1929 film by Sidney Franklin

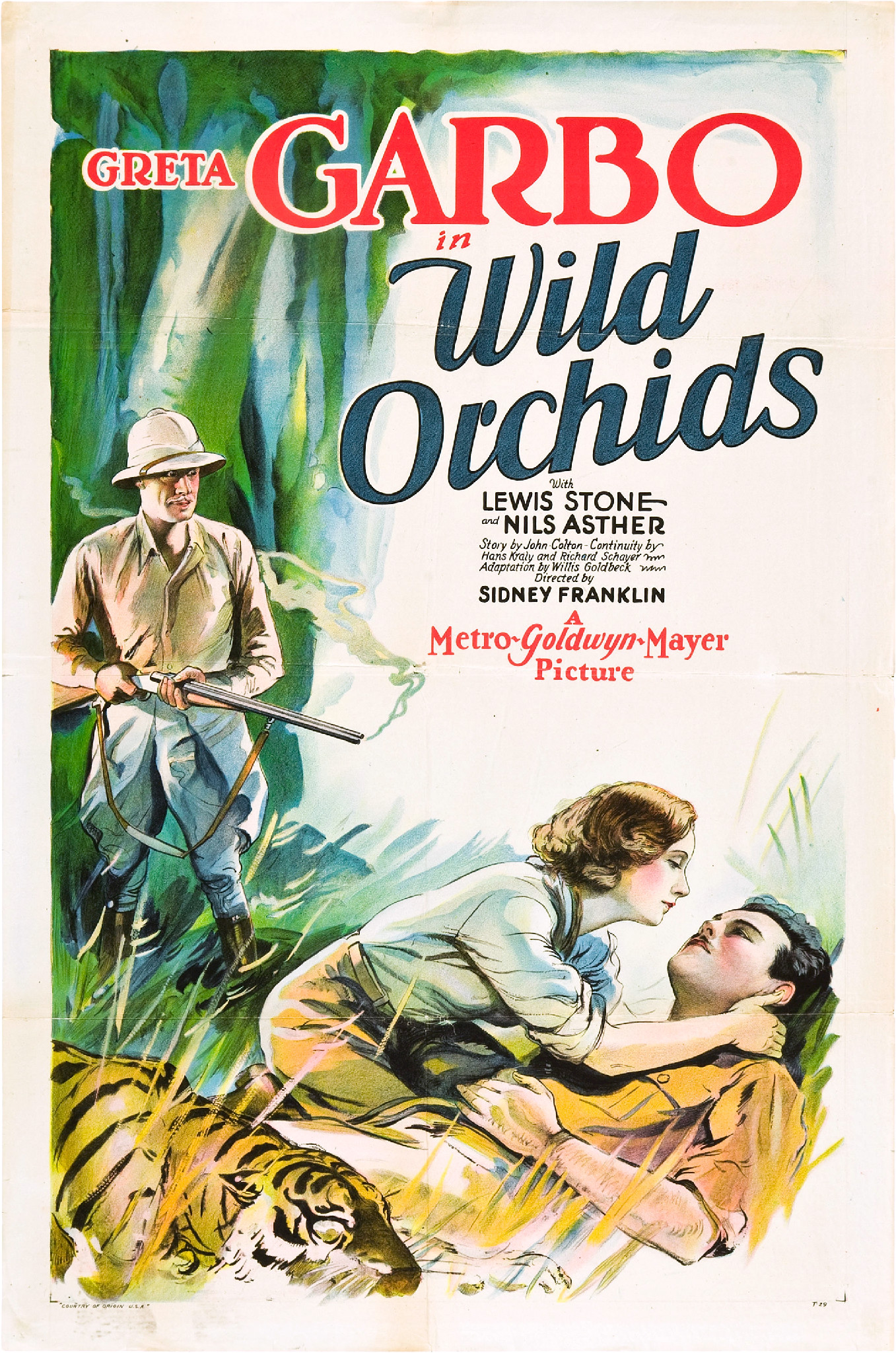
- Theatrical release poster
- Directed by: Sidney Franklin
- Written by: Hanns Kräly; Ruth Cummings; Willis Goldbeck; Richard Schayer
- Based on: Heat novel by John Colton
- Produced by: Irving Thalberg
- Starring: Greta Garbo; Lewis Stone; Nils Asther
- Cinematography: William Daniels
- Edited by: Conrad A. Nervig
- Music by: William Axt (uncredited)
- Distributed by: Metro-Goldwyn-Mayer
- Release date: February 23, 1929
- Running time: 100 minutes
- Country: United States
- Languages: Sound (Synchronized); English Intertitles
- Budget: US$322,312.12 ($6,043,000 today)
- Box office: $1,165,000 ($21,840,000 today)

Wild Orchids is a 1929 American synchronized sound drama film from Metro-Goldwyn-Mayer directed by Sidney Franklin and starring Greta Garbo, Lewis Stone and Nils Asther. Only these three stars received cast credit. While the film has no audible dialog, it was released with a synchronized musical score with sound effects using both the sound-on-disc and sound-on-film process. The plot is very similar to Garbo's later sound film, The Painted Veil (1934).

== Plot ==
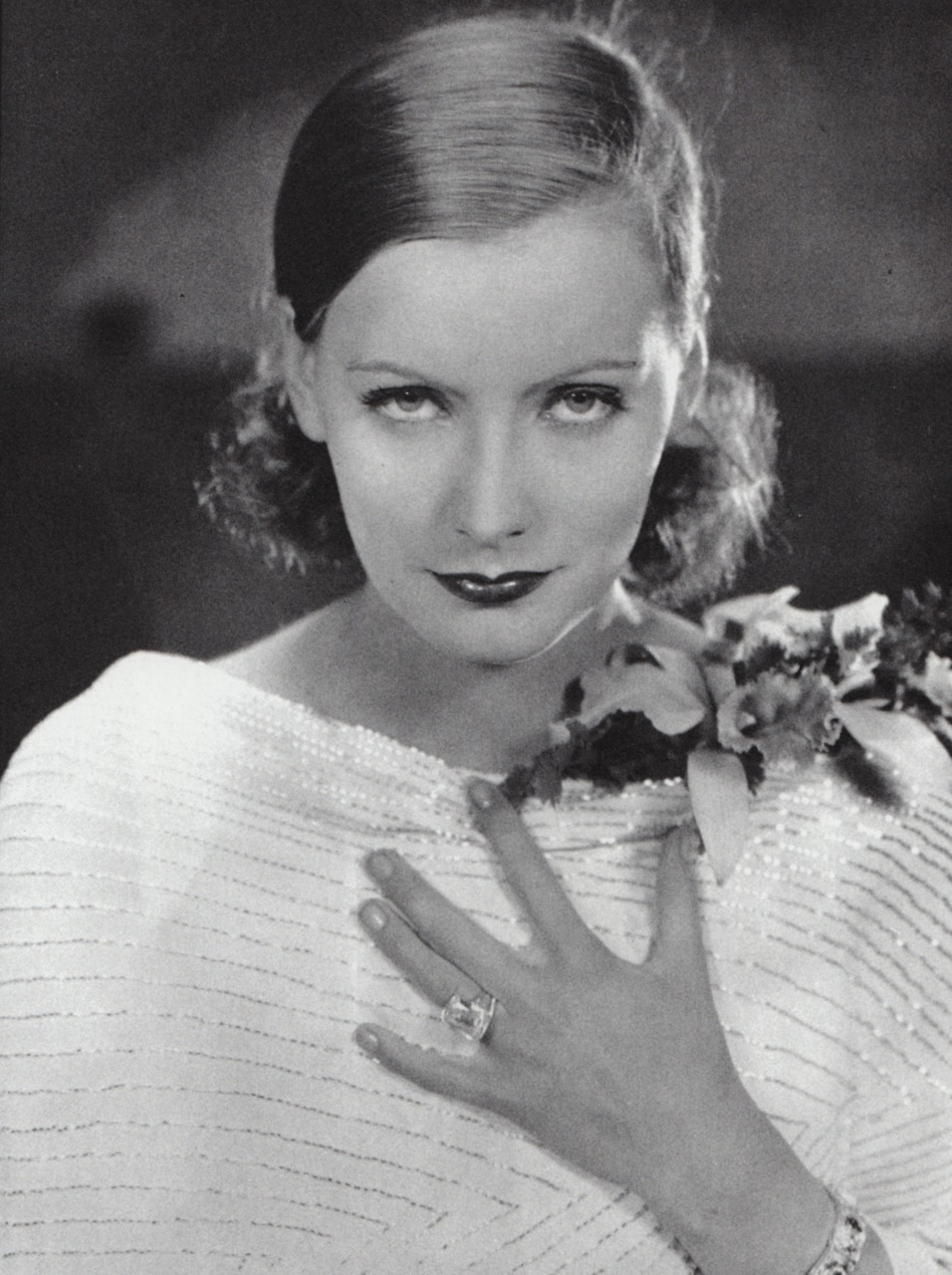
Greta Garbo in Wild Orchids

Wild Orchids (1929)

John Sterling takes his young wife Lillie to Java where he plans to invest in tea plantations. Beyond the difference in years between the two, he is neglectful, which creates reactions of frustration from his romantic young wife.

Aboard a ship, Lillie witnesses a scene of cruelty – a passenger hits one of his servants. The violent man is immediately taken by the beauty of this mysterious woman and will endeavor all to make her acquaintance. Therefore, he contacts the husband, whom he attracts with his deep knowledge of the Javanese tea market. John presents his new friend, the young and handsome Prince de Gace to his wife, who immediately recognizes the violent man. Multiple situations offer the Prince a chance to approach Lillie, who spurns him. He then uses force to kiss her - Lillie tries to talk to her husband, in vain.

In Java, the couple are hosted by the Prince, at his vast estate. Lillie avoids being alone with the Prince – she even wishes to join her husband in his professional investigations, which he refuses. Finally, Lillie and the Prince are alone for a few hours, and his efforts intensify. He forces himself upon her again, and she finally yields and returns his kiss.

John returns to surprise the kiss in Chinese shadows, raising the question of whether the woman embracing De Gace is his wife. His suspicion confirmed by a misplaced necklace, the men go on a tiger hunt. The Prince is hurt. John decides to return to the United States alone, but his wife reaffirms her love for him.

== Cast ==
- Greta Garbo as Lillie Sterling
- Lewis Stone as John Sterling
- Nils Asther as Prince De Gace
- Dick Sutherland (uncredited)

== Music ==
The film featured a theme song entitled “Wild Orchids” by Ray Klages (words) and William Axt and David Mendoza (music).

== Production ==
Production took place between October and November 1928 at the Metro-Goldwyn-Mayer studios in Culver City, California (USA). During production, Garbo spent one day filming a cameo appearance for the James Cruze film A Man's Man. Production stills photographs were made by James Manatt and production portraits were taken by Ruth Harriet Louise in October 1928.

This is often listed as a "silent" film, but it is not. It was released as a non-talking sound film, with a complete orchestral score and sound effects, retained on both the VHS and DVD releases. Dialogue was conveyed via title cards, per the standard silent film convention.

== Reception ==
=== Critical response ===
The film received 2.5 stars at All Movie Guide.

The New York Times called it "a pleasingly imaginative picturization of a special screen contribution from the pen of John Colton", praising the thespians' performances:

"Miss Garbo's acting is well-timed and, as usual, effective. It is not an easy rôle but she succeeds in imparting to it no small amount of subtlety. Nils Asther is capital as the Prince, a persistent individual who appears to be sadly lacking in caution. Lewis Stone, who is the villain of The Trial of Mary Dugan, does splendidly as the somewhat short-sighted husband of this silent film."

=== Box office ===
The film garnered receipts of US$1,165,000 ($622,000 in the US and $543,000 abroad), versus a budget of $322,000. It was one of the top-grossing films of the year. It generated MGM a profit of $380,000.

== Home media ==
TCM released a DVD version on its Vault Collection - The Warner Archive Collection, on July 1, 2009. A VHS version was released on September 1, 1988 (NTSC). A Laserdisc edition exists on a set containing also Garbo's Love, The Torrent and the surviving segment from The Divine Woman.

== See also ==
- List of early sound feature films (1926–1929)
