= William Axt =

American composer

- Born: April 19, 1888; New York City, New York, U.S.
- Died: February 13, 1959 (aged 70); Ukiah, California, U.S.
- Education: DeWitt Clinton High School; National Conservatory of Music of America; University of Chicago
- Occupation: Composer

William Axt (April 19, 1888 – February 13, 1959) was an American composer of nearly two hundred film scores.

== Life and career ==
Born in New York City, Axt graduated from DeWitt Clinton High School in The Bronx and studied at the National Conservatory of Music of America. He earned a Doctor of Musical Arts degree from the University of Chicago in 1922. He studied in Berlin under Xaver Scharwenka.

Axt made his American debut as a conductor on December 28, 1910.

He served as an assistant conductor for the Hammerstein Grand Opera Company and was a musical director for the Capitol Theatre in Manhattan before joining the music department at Metro-Goldwyn-Mayer in 1929.

Axt retired from the film industry to raise cattle and breed horses in Laytonville, California. He died in Ukiah, California, and had at least one son (Edward).

== Selected filmography ==
- Theodora (1921; with Erno Rapee)
- The Prisoner of Zenda (1922)
- Greed (1924)
- The Big Parade (1925; with David Mendoza)
- Ben-Hur (1925; with David Mendoza)
- The Merry Widow (1925)
- La Bohème (1926)
- Don Juan (1926; with David Mendoza)
- The Scarlet Letter (1926)
- Camille (1927)
- The Student Prince in Old Heidelberg (1927; with David Mendoza)
- Our Dancing Daughters (1928)
- Show People (1928)
- The Trail of '98 (1928)
- White Shadows in the South Seas (1928)
- A Woman of Affairs (1928)
- The Duke Steps Out (1929)
- The Flying Fleet (1929)
- The Kiss (1929)
- The Last of Mrs. Cheyney (1929)
- Madame X (1929)
- Our Modern Maidens (1929)
- Where East Is East (1929)
- A Free Soul (1931)
- Private Lives (1931)
- Susan Lenox (Her Fall and Rise) (1931)
- Faithless (1932)
- Grand Hotel (1932)
- The Mask of Fu Manchu (1932)
- The Washington Masquerade (1932)
- The Wet Parade(1932)
- Broadway to Hollywood (1933)
- Clear All Wires! (1933)
- Dinner at Eight (1933)
- Eskimo (1933)
- Gabriel Over the White House (1933)
- Hell Below (1933)
- Penthouse (1933)
- The Secret of Madame Blanche (1933)
- Sons of the Desert (1933)
- Storm at Daybreak (1933)
- Reunion in Vienna (1933)
- Forsaking All Others (1934)
- Manhattan Melodrama (1934)
- Men in White (1934)
- Operator 13 (1934)
- Sadie McKee (1934)
- The Thin Man (1934)
- Tarzan and His Mate (1934)
- A Wicked Woman (1934)
- You Can't Buy Everything (1934)
- Buried Loot (1935), short
- Rendezvous (1935)
- David Copperfield (1935)
- Libeled Lady (1936)
- Tarzan Escapes (1936)
- We Went to College (1936)
- Beg, Borrow or Steal (1937)
- London by Night (1937)
- Parnell (1937)
- Under Cover of Night (1937)
- Everybody Sing (1938)
- Woman Against Woman (1938)
- Yellow Jack (1938)
- Sergeant Madden (1939)
- Tarzan Finds a Son! (1939)
- Tell No Tales (1939)
- Untamed (1940)
- Little Nellie Kelly (1940)
- Tarzan's Secret Treasure (1941)
- Madame Curie (1943)
