= Letty Lynton dress =

An evening gown worn by Joan Crawford

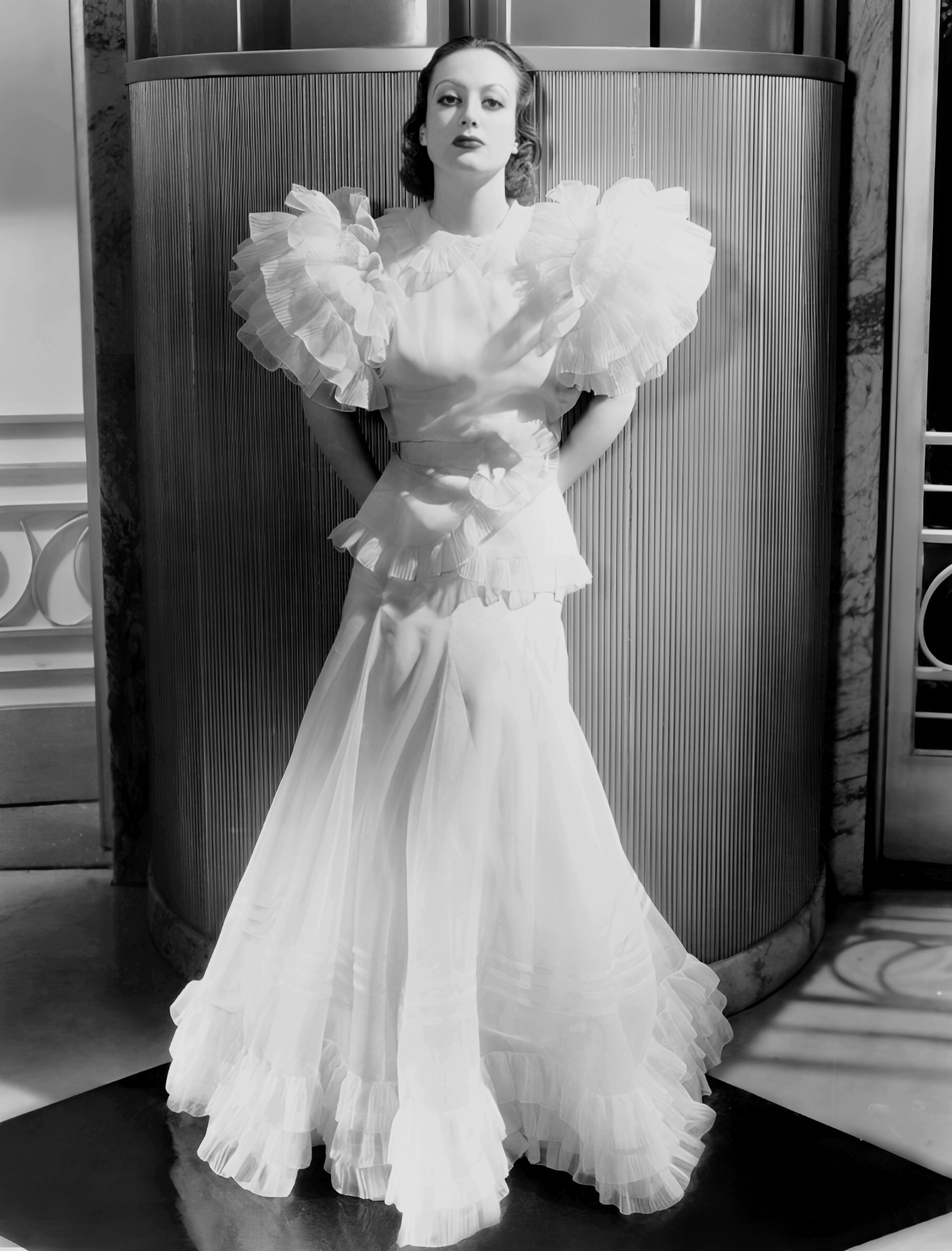
Joan Crawford wearing the Letty Lynton dress, photographed by George Hurrell, 1932

The Letty Lynton dress is an evening gown created by costume designer Adrian and worn by American actress Joan Crawford for the 1932 film Letty Lynton. It is featured in a scene in which socialite Letty Lynton (Crawford) has a romantic meeting with a wealthy man, Jerry Darrow (Robert Montgomery). Adrian helped to establish the images of Metro-Goldwyn-Mayer actresses like Crawford, and his work attracted a large female audience and was frequently copied for cheaper retail versions. He worked with Crawford for thirty-one films over twelve years, creating a fashion silhouette for her that emphasized her shoulders. The Letty Lynton dress has over-sized leg-of-mutton sleeves, inspired by Adrian's interest in 1890s fashion. The costume was promoted in glamour photos, which were circulated in fan and movie magazines.

The gown was popular throughout the United States, Europe, and Australia through the 1930s, even after Letty Lynton was pulled from circulation following a plagiarism lawsuit. This was seen as a sign of Hollywood overtaking Paris as the trendsetter for American fashion and led to padded shoulders, diaphanous clothing, and romanticism becoming trends in the 1930s. Women wore more affordable ready-to-wear versions for special occasions, and similar designs were adapted for other 1930s films. The Letty Lynton dress has become regarded as a definitive look of the decade, and it is often discussed within film fashion history. Academic analysis has focused on the gown's role and appearance in Letty Lynton, as well as on its connection with consumerism in the United States.

== Background ==
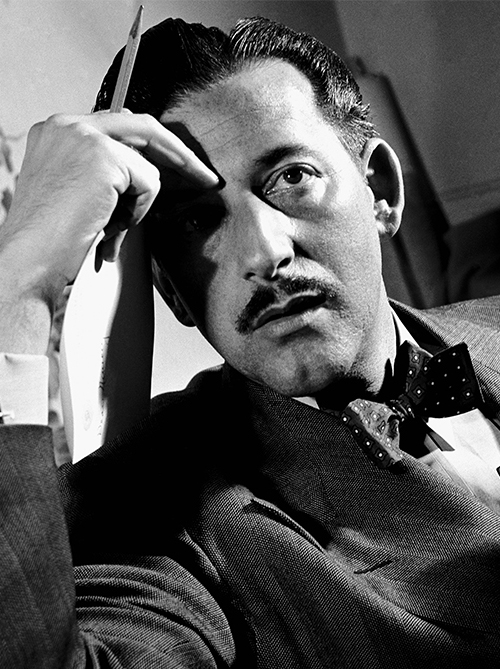
Adrian, 1944

American costume designer Adrian was hired by Metro-Goldwyn-Mayer (MGM) in 1928, and by the 1930s, his work attracted a large female audience to MGM's films and was frequently copied by designers who created cheaper versions for retail. In the late 1920s and early 1930s, film studios heavily incorporated fashion in their marketing campaigns to appeal to women, and movies with Adrian often included montages and fashion shows modeling clothing and accessories to this female audience. Designer Helen Rose noted that women loved Adrian's designs regardless of their context in the films, writing: "It did not matter if the clothes suited the scene". During this time, Adrian became well known for helping to establish the looks for MGM actresses Joan Crawford, Greta Garbo, and Norma Shearer.

Adrian created costumes for Crawford in thirty-one films over twelve years, a partnership that began in 1929 when he was chosen to be her exclusive designer at MGM. Fashion had played a central role in Crawford's career since its beginning, during which she was styled and promoted as a flapper. While working with Adrian, she was known as a clothes horse as shown by the media's focus on her costumes and personal style; critics paid more attention to her fashion rather than to her film's direction or script. Over the course of the 1930s, Crawford transitioned to playing wealthy society girls and women who are elevated to a higher social class.

Adrian's trademarks were the use of expensive materials even for informal outfits, a focus on the neckline with different collar styles, and asymmetrical and sculptural designs. According to fashion historian Howard Gutner, Adrian dressed Crawford in "many of his most extreme fashion statements". Crawford had a long waist, short legs, and broad shoulders, which Gutner described as potentially challenging for designers as these physical features could "overwhelm conventional clothes". Adrian developed a fashion silhouette that emphasized the shoulders to "balance out [Crawford's] figure", and this style became a dominant feature in 1930s fashion. (Note: Journalists in the 1940s developed the word "Adrianize" to describe the action of adding larger and more defined shoulders to a garment.) Looking back in 1941, he said: "Who would have thought that my entire reputation as a designer would rest on Joan Crawford's shoulders!"

== Design and development ==
A lithograph depicting a woman wearing a dress with leg-of-mutton sleeves, 1895

In the 1932 film Letty Lynton, Crawford plays the title character, a socialite who has a romance with a wealthy man, Jerry Darrow (Robert Montgomery), and kills her former lover, Emile Renaul (Nils Asther). Adrian designed the gowns for the movie, and under his supervision, a team of up to 250 would work on the costumes; this included what would become known as the Letty Lynton dress. (Note: The Letty Lynton dress was listed as "dress number 578" during the film's production.) Crawford wears it for the scene when Lynton meets Darrow on a cruise ship. In the sequence, Lynton cries while remembering disagreements with her mother and later has a romantic moment with Darrow on the ship's deck. (Note: Crawford wears the outfit for less than five minutes in fhe film.) To promote Letty Lynton, MGM featured Crawford wearing the gown in glamour photos, which were taken by George Hurrell and circulated in fans and movie magazines such as Photoplay. The studio focused the marketing around the costumes rather than on the plot.

The Letty Lynton dress is an evening gown made of a white starched chiffon and featuring over-sized puffy and ruffled leg-of-mutton sleeves. These large sleeves were made to hide Crawford's broad shoulders. In a 1933 interview with the Ladies' Home Journal, Adrian referred to the gown's ruffle as its "repetitious note" which pulled the most attention. Prior to Letty Lynton, Adrian had been inspired by 1890s fashion, which often had mutton sleeves, and incorporated these influences into dresses for Marion Davies in The Florodora Girl (1930), Madge Evans in Son of India (1931), and Crawford in This Modern Age (1931). This coincided with the 1930s interest in past styles, and with how in 1930 and 1931, puffed sleeves and exaggerated shoulders had been used by Italian fashion designer Elsa Schiaparelli and by French designers, although Adrian would later popularize these elements.

The dress has a Buster Brown collar, and its skirt was created by what academics Charlotte Cornelia Herzog and Jane Marie Gaines described as a "series of three tucks appearing above the three-ruffled border" which make a "flaring and circular fullness". This adhered to contemporary fashion trends, which were moving toward longer hemlines and more form-fitting silhouettes. The ruffles, which were sewn on the collar, sleeves, peplum, belt buckle and shirt, are accordion pleated. Along with the peplum, the dress has a fitted bodice, which put an emphasis on the hips. According to Howard Gutner, it was unlike contemporary gowns, as Adrian had "reversed the drooping lines seen between 1930 and 1932" in favor of ones that "moved upward". Looking back on the dress's design, Adrian felt that it had many different ideas. Film studies scholar Rashna Wadia Richards wrote that as a result of the collaborative process behind the gown's creation, it had become a "collage, out of bits and pieces from different eras".

== Reception ==
=== Popularity ===
Any list, however incomplete, of Hollywood-born clothes would be silly without mention of the Letty Lynton dress. Every little girl, all over the country, within two weeks of the release of Joan Crawford's picture, felt she would die if she couldn't have a dress like that. With the result that the country was flooded with little Joan Crawfords.

— Nancy Hardon, "Does Hollywood Create?", Vogue, February 1, 1933

Contemporary reviewers of Letty Lynton praised Crawford's costumes, although a writer for The Spokesman-Review criticized them as "bizarre". Shortly after the film's release, writers Edward Sheldon and Margaret Ayer Barnes sued MGM for plagiarism, claiming that it had copied their play Dishonored Lady (1930). In 1936, it was ruled that Letty Lynton had used material from Dishonored Lady, resulting in the movie being pulled from circulation; (Note: Following the lawsuit, there was one known 35 mm film print of Letty Lynton in the MGM vault in Culver City, California. In 2026, the film was shown at the TCM Classic Film Festival after the copyright for Dishonored Lady expired.) despite this, the Letty Lynton dress was popular with Americans, Europeans, and Australians, and it remained so throughout the 1930s. (Note: Jane Marie Gaines attributed the dress's continued popularity partially to film stills and promotional photos.) The gown started trends with padded shoulders and diaphanous outfits decorated with ruffles, lace, and frills and with romanticism. In 1936, American journalist Edith Lindeman wrote that the Letty Lynton dress was "responsible for changing the sleeves of the nation overnight".

This popularity demonstrated that Hollywood had replaced Paris as the trendsetter for American fashion. It also established Adrian's influence as a costume designer, as well as the marketing of Crawford as a clotheshorse. In a 1932 Silver Screen article, Wes Colman wrote: "Paris may decree this and Paris may decree that, but when that Crawford girl pops up in puffed sleeves, then it’s puffed sleeves for us before tea time." Haute couture designers denounced Hollywood as "vulgar", but followed its trends by focusing on shoulders for their own fashions. MGM attempted to repeat their success with the Letty Lynton dress by marketing the "Christina look" with Greta Garbo in the 1933 film Queen Christina, but this was not successful.

There was pushback from the fashion community in the 1930s to the Letty Lynton dress. A 1933 Marcy's advertisement included the statement: "The Letty Lynton frou-frou frill craze is dead as a doornail." The following year, Alma Whitaker for the Los Angeles Times determined that "puffs and leg-o'-mutton sleeves are also passé".

=== Imitations ===
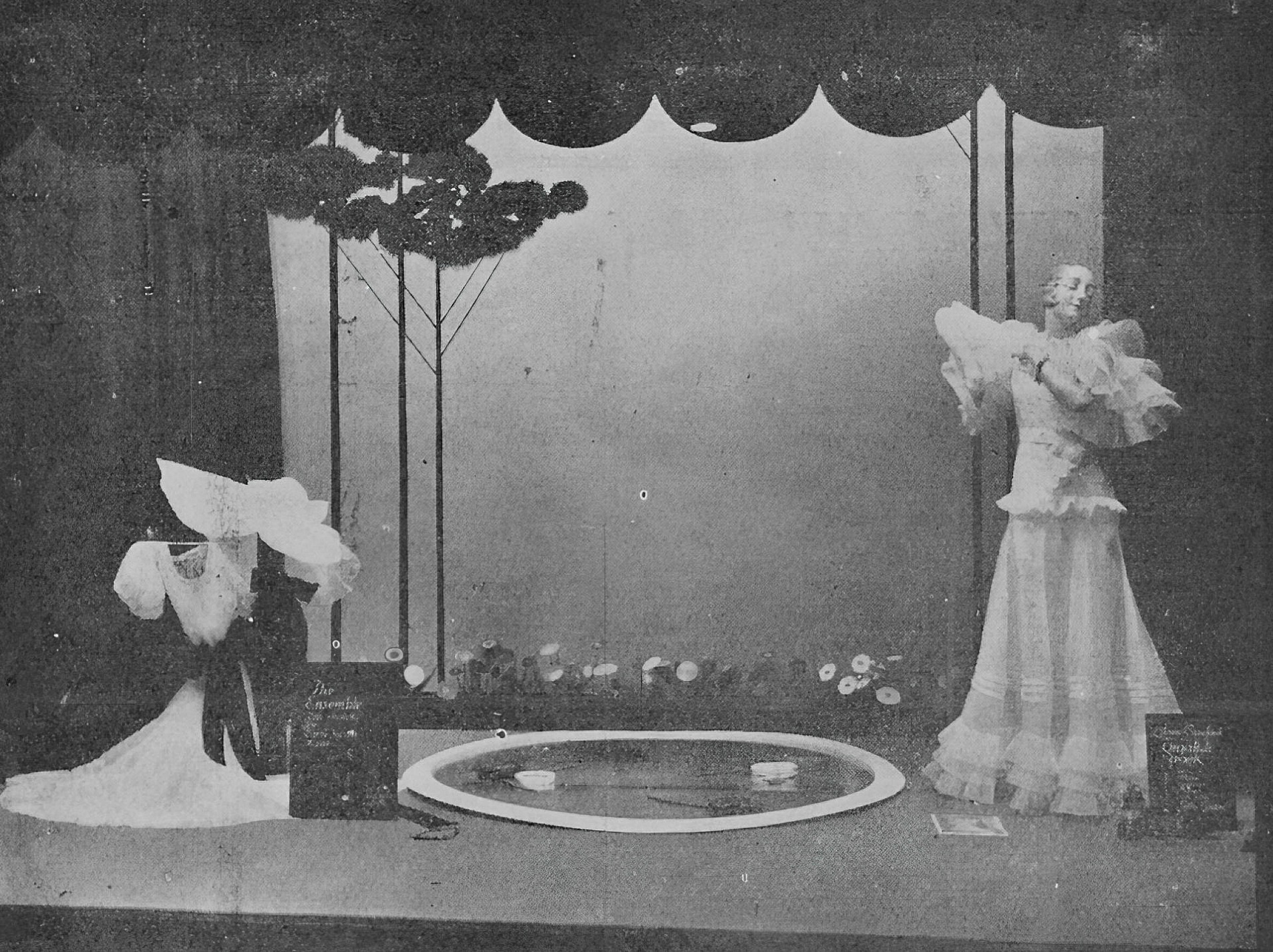
A display of Letty Lynton imitations in an Australian storefront, 1932

Even though Adrian complicated his designs partially to deter imitators, more affordable but not exact ready-to-wear versions of his clothing were created in response to their popularity. Companies marketed their creations with Adrian's name, which resulted in lawsuits from MGM. In May 1932, Macy's reportedly sold 500,000 copies of the Letty Lynton dress as a tie-in with the film, although this number is considered an apocryphal story circulated in fan and fashion magazines. (Note: The exact number of Letty Lynton recreations made and sold is unknown.) The same year, Australian department store David Jones had replicas made for its display windows.

Women wore the Letty Lynton dress for special occasions like high school graduations, proms, weddings, and country club dances. Patterns for the Letty Lynton dress were also sold for both adults and children. Adrian found the original gown "amusing but a trifle extreme", and thought the retails copies were even bigger and more dramatic; he viewed these imitations as proof that film could encourage American women to be more experimental with their wardrobe.

Throughout the 1930s, Hollywood costume designers would adapt the Letty Lynton dress into their films. Norma Shearer wore a similar version of the gown for Strange Interlude in 1932, and the following year, over-sized sleeves were used in four films—for Dolores del Río in Flying Down to Rio, Katharine Hepburn in Christopher Strong, Glenda Farrell in Lady for a Day, and Fredi Washington in The Emperor Jones. Adrian repeated this design for Crawford in 1933 for Today We Live and Dancing Lady. (Note: Psychology professor Patricia D. Stokes wrote that Crawford continued to wear oversized sleeves even after she stopped working with Adrian and MGM. She referred to Crawford's suits in the 1945 film Mildred Pierce as an example of this. Crawford wore an outfit similar to the Letty Lynton dress in the 1954 film Johnny Guitar.) According to curator Susan Brown, the dress inspired Walter Plunkett's designs for the 1939 movie Gone with the Wind. Cartoonist Jackie Ormes drew a version in 1937 for the title character of her Torchy Brown in Dixie to Harlem comic strip. Puffy sleeves were also worn outside of popular media by well-known individuals, such as Shearer, Marlene Dietrich, and a ten-year-old Elizabeth II.

== Analysis ==
The Letty Lynton dress was analyzed in the context of the film, as well as the culture of the 1930s. Scholars believed that the costume was meant to be give Crawford a "look of innocence and vulnerability" and that the film presents her as "demure and submissive in the frothy fantasy dress". This was meant to encourage audiences to sympathize with Letty Lynton early in the film, prior to her involvement in Emile Renaul's death. Rashna Wadia Richards did not believe this intention was successful, instead labeling the dress "unmistakably surreal". The shape of the sleeves was the subject of interpretation. Scholar Elizabeth Wilson likened them to "twin powder puffs or embryo wings", and Howard Gutner wrote that with her oversized sleeves, Crawford seems to "propel forward like twin engines". Authors also commented on Crawford's appearance in the dress. Film studies professor Sarah Berry wrote that she takes on a "posture of youthful stoicism". Gutner described Crawford as having a "restless drive", which he saw in her other 1930s films, and said that the "billowing ruffles captured her at her most feminine".

It was a blank garment in which all American women could now clothe themselves (metaphorically and in reality) to signify their modernity and membership of a new society.

— Cultural studies scholar Christopher Breward on the Letty Lynton dress

Cultural studies scholar Christopher Breward discussed the Letty Lynton dress in relationship to consumerism in the United States. Breward compared it to the packaging for Lucky Strike cigarettes, writing that both were designed to appeal to a new American identity with new preferences. Costume historian Patricia Campbell Warner cited the Letty Lynton dress in her chapter about the Americanization of fashion. She felt that the costume best represented how Hollywood studios used old fashion trends to market new clothing for retail, in effect "obliterating any true design". Media studies professor Kate Fortmueller referenced the gown as an example of how Hollywood studios pushed its costume designers to "design not just to design, but to design to inspire emulation".

Jane Marie Gaines examined the dress from the perspective of wearability. Although Gaines considered the oversized sleeves to be unwearable, she wrote that people viewed these elements as an opportunity to add a sense of fantasy into their lives, even if they did not buy and wear the outfit. Fashion studies professor Paul Jobling argued that the promotion of clothing, like the Letty Lynton dress, through film and in display windows allowed for cosumers to vicariously enjoy fashion and to imagine owning these garments. He called this the "projective fantasy of ownership", comparing Letty Lynton's appeal during the Great Depression to the impact of the 2008 Sex and the City movie during the Great Recession. Gutner believed that the Letty Lynton dress "helped lighten the gray Depression in America".

== Legacy ==
The Letty Lynton dress has become regarded as a definitive look of the 1930s. While discussing it in his 2001 book, Howard Gutner wrote: "More has been written about Crawford's shoulders and Adrian's emphasis on them than almost any other aspect of thirties fashion." As part of a 2015 Vogue article, Laird Borrelli-Persson attributed the gown's popularity to how it "had tapped into a collective postwar need for romance". It has been described as the most copied dress, and Rashna Wadia Richards considered it one of the most influential parts of American fashion. In 2013, The Plain Dealer's Marylou Luthor said that the gown continues to have an impact on fashion, calling it the "standard by which other ruffles were judged".

The Letty Lynton dress has also been identified as "iconic" within the history of film fashion and is frequently cited in publications on Hollywood's costume design. American costume designer Edith Head named it "the single most important fashion influence in film history". The dress was the first film costume to be mass produced, and Elizabeth Wilson viewed it as an example of film fashion's ties with retail and how this helped to develop consumerism in the United States. According to Charlotte Cornelia Herzog and Jane Marie Gaines, fashion historians have referred to the Letty Lynton dress as the "most dramatic evidence of motion picture 'influence' on fashion behavior". The gown has also been included in articles about Hollywood's waning impact on fashion, which writers have attributed to the rising popularity of socialites, greater access to fashion in other mediums, and the dissolution of the studio system and their marketing campaigns.

Antique Trader's Kris Manty wrote that the Letty Lynton dress had influenced fashion designers beyond the 1930s, such as Valentino in 1973, Karl Lagerfeld in 2017, and Elie Saab in 2020. As a child, Beril Jents was inspired to become a fashion designer after seeing the gown and creating her own version. Actress Mila Kunis wore a similar costume for a 2009 Vanity Fair photoshoot, which focused on films set in the 1930s. Journalist Booth Moore described looks from fashion stylist Rachel Zoe's Spring 2012 collection and Kate and Laura Mulleavy's Fall 2020 collection for Rodarte as reminiscent of the Letty Lynton dress.

The original Letty Lynton dress has either been lost or destroyed. (Note: Hollywood studios initially did not preserve costumes and would instead loan them out, reuse the materials for other garments, or lose them entirely. The costumes were not stored in ideal conditions, which resulted in them getting damaged. In 1939, MGM burned hundreds of costumes that were deemed either unusable or unsellable.) Imitations have been included in fashion archives for the Maryland Historical Society, the Chicago History Museum, the Alameda Museum, and Brenau University. One of the Macy's reproductions was displayed in 1986 as part of a travelling exhibition by the Smithsonian Institution. A photo of the Letty Lynton dress and a related Butterick pattern and Gimbels advertisement were a part of a 2010 exhibit for University of California, Irvine. Curator Lori Hall-Araujo said that the gown was the "centerpiece" of her 2017 Stephens College exhibit.
