= Beril Jents =

Australian fashion designer

- Born: 1918; Sydney, Australia
- Died: 8 June 2013 (aged 94–95)
- Occupation: Fashion designer

Beril Jents (1918 – 8 June 2013) was an Australian fashion designer. She is recognized as "Australia’s first queen of haute couture" and specialized in evening and bridal wear, although the term "haute couture" is not strictly correct in this context as it refers to high-end made-to-measure fashion design.

She was noted in hundreds of features in newspapers and advertisements during her career from the 1930s to 1980s and was patronized by socialites and creatives; the majority from Sydney and Brisbane. International clients included Elizabeth Taylor, Janet Gaynor, Dame Margot Fonteyn, Vivien Leigh, Eartha Kitt, Bo Derek and Winifred Atwell.

Jents was almost unique as an Australian fashion designer during the '40s and '50s as she did not just copy European or Parisian styles but produced original work. She was recognized by her contemporaries such as Norman Hartnell.

Her most notable and original collections include the Potato Sack of 1947 and Pan Am collection of 1948. Important designs included the peg-bottom trousers inspired by the Zoot Suit.

Jents' work has been collected by the Powerhouse Museum and the National Gallery of Victoria.

Jents died on 8 June 2013 aged 95.

== History ==
Jents came from a modest background in Sydney, born in 1918. She assisted her mother, Alice Strudwick, in dressmaking and thus first learnt her skills at her side, also acquiring her mother's knowledge of materials. She was an outsider and initially unfamiliar with the high society that she would one day serve. Her next role was as a trainee lithographic artist at Hollander and Govett, Sydney. She then undertook an apprenticeship with Sydney-based French dressmaker Madame Gallet. Here she learnt to cut without a pattern. Gallet closed the business and returned to France in 1934.

At the age of 16 Jents opened her studio in Charing Cross, Waverley, Sydney. She then moved to the corner of Newland Street, Bondi Junction. For the following 10 years she produced made-to-measure garments for a select clientele. She was acclaimed for the way she cut and constructed sleeves in jackets.

In 1944 the business was formally registered and located in King's Cross, at the time a very bohemian area.

Jents collaborated with Sydney-based actors such as Noël Coward and Sir Robert Helpmann. She designed for the leading theatrical plays of her era including The Reluctant Debutante, Call Me Madam, Simon and Laura and Nude with Violin.

At age 32 she opened a new salon in the St James building in Sydney's city centre.

In 1952 she was acknowledged as the ‘pre eminent Australian Fashion Designer’ and invited to represent Australia in an international fashion show in New York City where Norman Hartnell represented England and Givenchy represented France. This indicates of the calibre of designers invited to participate.

Jents did not advertise, preferring to promote herself though word of mouth recommendations. The media reported on her enthusiastically and regularly. It was they who crowned her “Australia’s Queen of Haute Couture” and in 1972 fashion journalist Glenys Bell hailed her as “the sole survivor of Haute Couture in Australia”.

She retired in 1986 - after six decades of work.

== Inspiration and notable works ==
Jents adapted the looks from Europe and Paris in original designs to suit the Australian lifestyle and dress culture which she described as “much simpler than the European life”. She designed modern clothes which she tried to imbue with a sense of timelessness and as such was well patronised by a younger clientele.

Jents was inspired by the rarefied glamour associated with Hollywood films and its stars in the 1930s. The costumes Adrian designed for the 1932 film Letty Lynton were very influential, especially one gown of white organdy with large puffed sleeves which sold over 500,000 dresses in the U.S. Jents reproduced this dress in Australia. She said of the design “It planted in my mind another seed for the future, to go on and create glamorous clothes”.

Jents liked to drape fabric on the stand and directly on the body and was also inspired by the Parisian couturière Madame Gres.

=== Potato Sack (1947) ===
This collection was an early example of sustainability and recycling in high end Australian fashion. Large hessian potato sacks were purchased from the local green grocer and then Jents would soak them in the bath and boil them in copper in order to soften them and achieve the desired texture. She described this fabric as “like very coarse linen”. She sewed A-line full skirts and beaded and embroidered them with straw work.

Academic scholars have suggested parallels with Coco Chanel who used inexpensive jersey fabric for her post World War 1 designs.

The entire collection was purchased by Sheila Scotter, buyer at Georges of Collins Street in Melbourne, who was considered an ‘arbiter of good taste’ at the time (as evidenced by her subsequent position as Vogue Australia's Editor-in-chief.)

=== Pan Am (1948) ===
This was a collection designed for air travel with Pan American Airlines. Jents collaborated to design lightweight travel garments for Pan Am's launch of the Strato-Clipper aeroplane. The collection was black and white and launched in the world's first in flight fashion show.

== Notable clients ==
- Mary Horden (Australian Woman's Weekly fashion editor from 1946 to 1957). Jents admits to making a reproduction of a Dior design for Mrs Horden. This ‘Peg skirt’ is credited by scholars for making Beril Jents famous. Although it was not an original work it did require strong technical ability.
- Sydney socialites Betty McInerney and Molly McSweeny.
- Elizabeth Taylor, Janet Gaynor, Dame Margot Fonteyn and Winifred Atwell.
