= Edward La Roche =

American actor (1878–1935)

Edward La Roche, also given as Edward LaRoche or Edouard La Roche, (1 August 1878 – 26 December 1935) was a French-born American actor. He was known for his work in New York on Broadway.

== Life and career ==
Edward La Roche was born in Metz, France on 1 August 1878. He served for seven years in the French Foreign Legion in Africa. He had an active career on the New York stage during the 1920s and 1930s. His performances on Broadway included Martin Brown's The Lady (1923, as The Loafer, Josef), Brown's Great Music (1924, as Louis), Margaret Ayer Barnes's The Age of Innocence (1928, as Carlos Saramonte) Donald Ogden Stewart's Rebound (1930, as Jules) Marya Mannes's Cafe (1930, as Josef), Hans Chlumberg's Miracle at Verdun (1931, as First Villager, Trolliet, & Vernier), John Galsworthy's The Roof (1931, as Gustave) George Abbott and Philip Dunning's Broadway (1927, as Joe at the Lyceum Theatre), John McDermott's Adam Had Two Sons (1932, as Pablo), Paul Hervey Fox's Foreign Affairs (1932, as waiter), William DuBois's I Loved You Wednesday (1932, as Antoine and Joe), and Ben Hecht and Charles MacArthur's Twentieth Century (1932-1933, as Second Beard)

On screen La Roche portrayed the orchestra leader in the 1925 silent film Soul-Fire. He died in New York City on December 26, 1935.
