= Soul-Fire =

1925 film

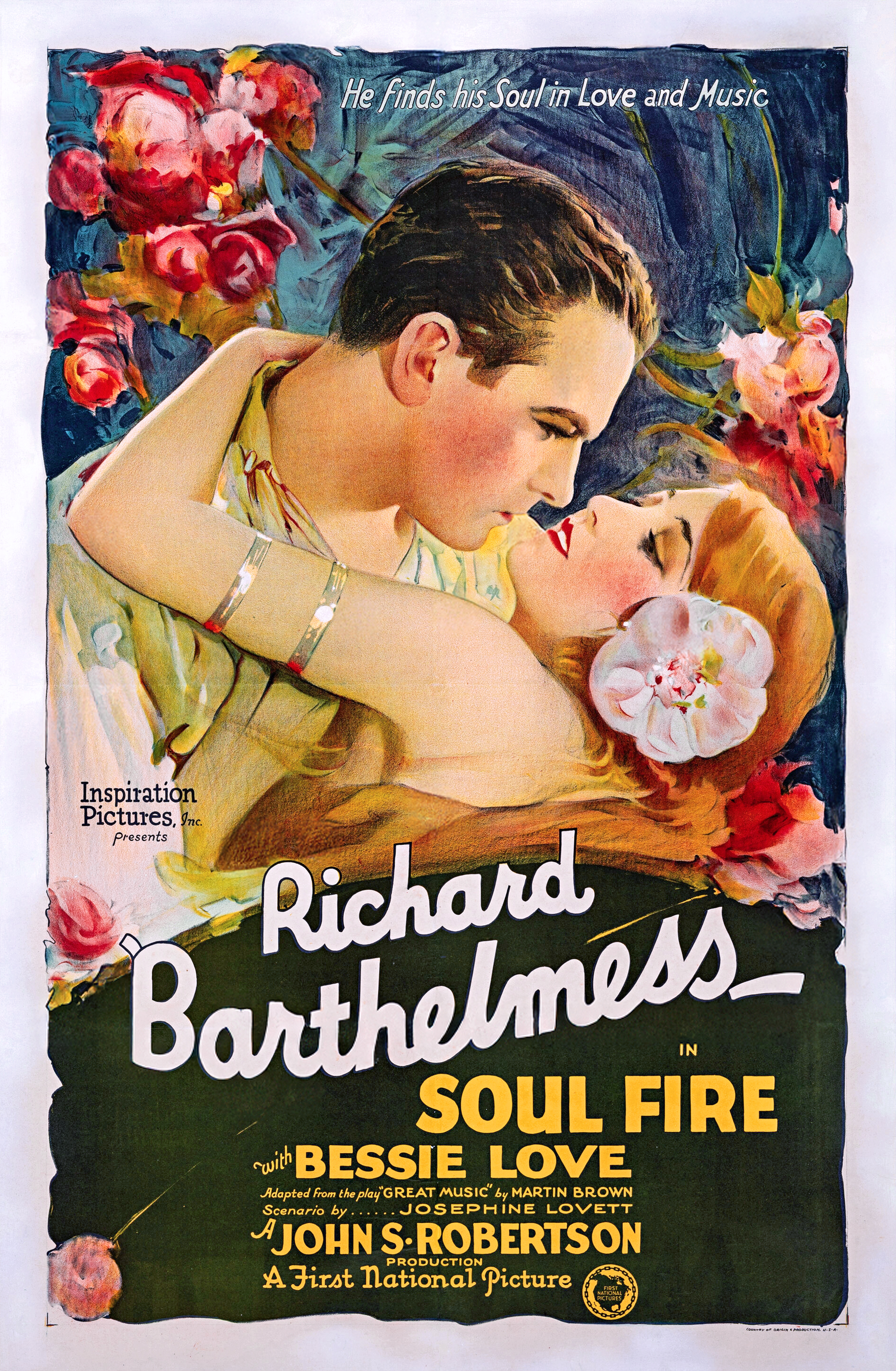
- Film poster
- Directed by: John S. Robertson
- Written by: Josephine Lovett (scenario)
- Based on: Great Music (play) by: Martin Brown; C. Linn Seiler (music)
- Produced by: Richard Barthelmess
- Starring: Richard Barthelmess; Bessie Love
- Cinematography: Roy Overbaugh
- Edited by: William Hamilton
- Production company: Inspiration Pictures
- Distributed by: First National Pictures
- Release date: May 3, 1925 (U.S.)
- Running time: 9 reels; 8,262 feet
- Country: United States
- Language: Silent (English intertitles)

Soul-Fire (also known as Soul Fire) is a 1925 American silent drama film starring Richard Barthelmess and Bessie Love. It was directed by John S. Robertson and was based on the Broadway production Great Music (1924) by Martin Brown.

The film was funded by Barthelmess through his Inspiration Pictures and released by First National Pictures.

Full film

== Plot ==
Eric Fane (Barthelmess) leaves New York City to study music composition in Italy, defying his father's wishes that he return home and enter the business world. Encouraged by a sophisticated older woman, Eric travels to Paris, where he falls for a Russian princess. He begins composing popular songs that achieve commercial success, funding a lavish lifestyle. However, Eric grows weary of writing trivial music and dedicates himself to serious composition. The change leaves him in poverty, which the princess will not tolerate, and she abandons him.

Eric drifts to Port Said, where he works as a pianist in a disreputable dancehall. After getting into a brawl with an intoxicated sailor, Eric shoots the man and takes on his identity. A sympathetic woman helps Eric escape aboard a vessel headed for the South Seas. Upon arrival, he deserts the ship and is discovered by Teita (Love), an orphaned English woman living alone.

Eric and Teita fall in love and arrange to wed in a native ceremony. The night before their wedding, Eric notices a mark on her shoulder that he fears may be leprosy. Alarmed, he summons a Christian doctor. During the agonizing wait, Eric channels his emotions into composing a great concerto, finally achieving the artistic breakthrough he has sought throughout his travels. The doctor arrives and reassures them that Teita's condition is not leprosy.

Eric's composition is later performed at a concert in London to widespread acclaim. The performance is structured around flashbacks depicting Eric's tumultuous journey.

== Cast ==
- Richard Barthelmess as Eric Fane
- Bessie Love as Teita
- Percy Ames as critic
- Charles Esdale as critic
- Effie Shannon as Mrs. Howard Fane, Eric's mother
- Lee Baker as Howard Fane, Eric's father
- Carlotta Monterey as Princess Rhea
- Gus Weinberg as the old musician
- Ann Brody as Princess Rhea's maid
- Helen Ware as San Francisco Sal
- Walter Long as Herbert Jones, a sailor
- Rita Rossi as the prima donna
- Edward LaRoche as the orchestra leader
- Harriet Sterling as Ruau
- Richard Harlan as Nuku
- Ellalee Ruby as dancer in a music hall
- Arthur Metcalfe as Dr. Travers, of the leper island
- George Pauncefort as Mr. Simpson, an attorney
- Aline Berry as Fleurette, a mannequin
- Harry Redding as the disappointed musician
- Leah La Roux as a dancer
- Zebaida as a dancer

Actors Helen Ware, Harriet Sterling, Edward LaRoche, and Leah La Roux were all cast members of the original play.

== Production ==
Most interiors were filmed at deForest Studios in Manhattan. Exteriors for the South Seas were shot throughout Florida. An Italian restaurant in Manhattan served as the canteen for the production.

== Reception ==
The film received generally positive reviews, with Barthelmess and Love receiving acclaim for their performances.

== See also ==
- South Seas genre
