= Twentieth Century (play) =

1932 play by Ben Hecht and Charles MacArthur

- Poster for the 2004 revival
- Written by: Ben Hecht; Charles MacArthur

Premiere
- Date: December 29, 1932
- Place: Broadhurst Theatre, New York City

Twentieth Century is a 1932 play by Ben Hecht and Charles MacArthur based on the unproduced play Napoleon of Broadway by Charles B. Millholland, inspired by his experience working for the eccentric Broadway impresario David Belasco.

== Synopsis ==
The Hecht-MacArthur comedy is set in the observation car of the 20th Century Limited, travelling from Chicago to New York's Grand Central Terminal. Aboard the luxury train are egomaniacal theatre producer Oscar Jaffe, desperately in need of a hit, and his former paramour and protégé, temperamental actress Lily Garland (born Mildred Plotka), who abandoned him for a Hollywood career. Oscar is determined to sign her for his new show, and Lily is just as determined to ignore his advances, both professional and personal.

== Richard Maney ==
Richard Maney, an American theatrical press publicity agent, was satirized in the play.

== Productions ==
The first Broadway production, directed by George Abbott, opened on December 29, 1932 at the Broadhurst Theatre, where it ran for 152 performances. Moffat Johnston and Eugenie Leontovich were the stars, with William Frawley and Edward La Roche in featured roles. It was adapted for a critically acclaimed film adaptation of the same name two years later.

The play has been revived on Broadway twice. The first, directed by José Ferrer, opened on December 24, 1950 at the ANTA Playhouse, where it ran for 233 performances. The production starred Ferrer as Oscar and Gloria Swanson, who designed her own gowns, as Lily. Werner Klemperer and Edward Platt were also in the cast.

The second revival, an adaptation by Ken Ludwig directed by Walter Bobbie, opened on March 25, 2004, at the Roundabout Theatre Company's American Airlines Theatre, where it ran for 27 previews and 84 performances. Alec Baldwin and Anne Heche headed a cast that included Dan Butler, Tom Aldredge and Julie Halston. Tony Award nominations went to Heche and Aldredge, and the production earned a Drama Desk Award nomination for Outstanding Set Design of a Play.

== Adaptations ==
=== Film ===
Hecht and MacArthur adapted their play for the 1934 screwball comedy Twentieth Century, directed by Howard Hawks and starring John Barrymore and Carole Lombard.

=== Radio ===
Orson Welles, Sam Levene and Elissa Landi starred in The Campbell Playhouse radio adaptation of Twentieth Century, broadcast March 24, 1939, on CBS Radio.

=== Television ===
Twentieth Century has been presented on television at least three times:

- On October 7, 1949, the Ford Theatre production with Fredric March and Lilli Palmer under the direction of Marc Daniels;
- On October 12, 1953, the Broadway Television Theatre version directed by Robert St. Aubrey and starring Fred Clark and Constance Bennett;
- On April 7, 1956, the Ford Star Jubilee presentation, produced by Arthur Schwartz and starring Orson Welles and Betty Grable.

=== Musical ===
On the Twentieth Century, a musical adaptation of the play by Betty Comden, Adolph Green and Cy Coleman, opened on Broadway on February 19, 1978, with John Cullum and Madeline Kahn as the stars. It was directed by Harold Prince and played for 11 previews and 449 performances.

== Awards and nominations ==
=== 2004 Broadway revival ===
Year	Award	Category	Nominee	Result
2004	Tony Awards	Best Actress in a Play	Anne Heche	Nominated
2004	Tony Awards	Best Featured Actor in a Play	Tom Aldredge	Nominated
2004	Drama Desk Award	Outstanding Set Design	John Lee Beatty	Won
