= The Age of Innocence (play) =

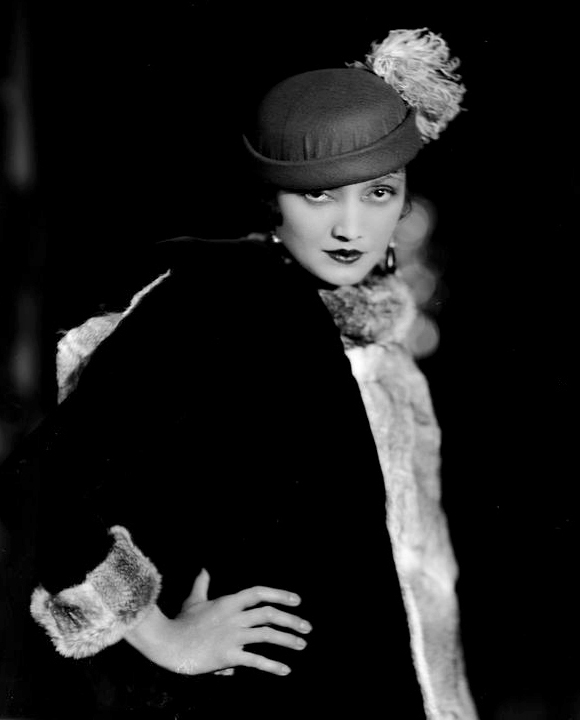
Katharine Cornell in the Broadway production of The Age of Innocence (1928), Barnes' first play

The Age of Innocence is a play in five scenes by Margaret Ayer Barnes that was adapted from Edith Wharton's 1920 novel of the same name.

== History ==
Barnes adapted the novel into a play at the urging of playwright Edward Sheldon who proposed the idea to Barnes in 1926 after Sheldon had become a friend of Edith Wharton. Created as a starring vehicle for Katharine Cornell, it premiered at the Teck Theatre in Buffalo, New York on November 12, 1928. It moved to Broadway's Empire Theatre where it opened on November 27, 1928. It ran for a total of 207 performances; closing in May 1929.

The cast included Cornell as Ellen Olenska, Arnold Korff as Julius Beaufort, Rollo Peters as Newland Archer, Margaret Barker as Alice Fordyce, Frazer Coulter as Mr. Henry van der Luyden, Isabel Irving as Mrs. Henry van der Luyden, Eden Gray as May van der Luyden, Franchot Tone as Newland Archer, Jr., Giannina Gatti as Anastasia, Stanley Gilkey as Harry Delancy, Jean Howard as Lucy Duane, Edouard La Roche as Carlos Saramonte, William Podmore as Sillerton Jackson, Henry Richard as Tom Hamilton, Nora Stirling as Jessie Lefferts, Albert Tavernier as Stephen Letterblair, Pierre Soupault as Jean, Peter Spencer as The Duke of St. Austrey, and Katherine Stewart as Mrs. Manson Mingott.

The play was a critical triumph for Cornell and the other cast members who received universally enthusiastic reviews in the press; although Barnes received some criticism for her failure to adapt the novel into a more conversational style.
