= Eugénie hat =

Small plumed hat worn tipped asymmetrically over the forehead

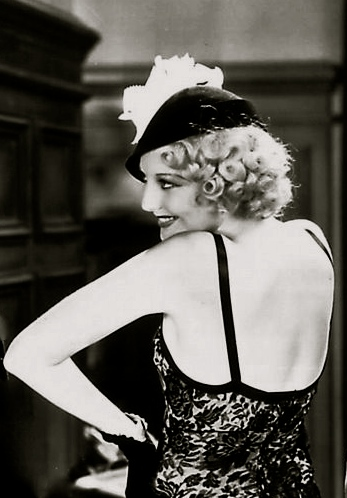
Thelma Todd wearing an Eugénie hat in the 1932 comedy Speak Easily

A Eugénie hat (sometimes also eugenie hat, Empress Eugenie hat or empress hat) is a small women's hat that is usually worn tilted forwards over the face, or it may be angled low over one eye. Typically, it is made of velvet or felt, although a variety of materials may be used. The classic design also has a plume of feathers, although other trims may be used.

It first became popular in the mid 19th century and was named after the French empress Eugénie de Montijo, a fashion trendsetter whose taste was much admired and copied. In the early 1930s an adapted version worn by Greta Garbo in the film Romance inspired a wave of similar styles. By 1932, the feather-trimmed small hat had become ubiquitous and was widely criticised by the press – especially in the United States – with some commentators predicting its rapid demise. Despite the criticisms, its tilted shape and jaunty feather trim influenced millinery styles for the succeeding decade.

== History of the design ==
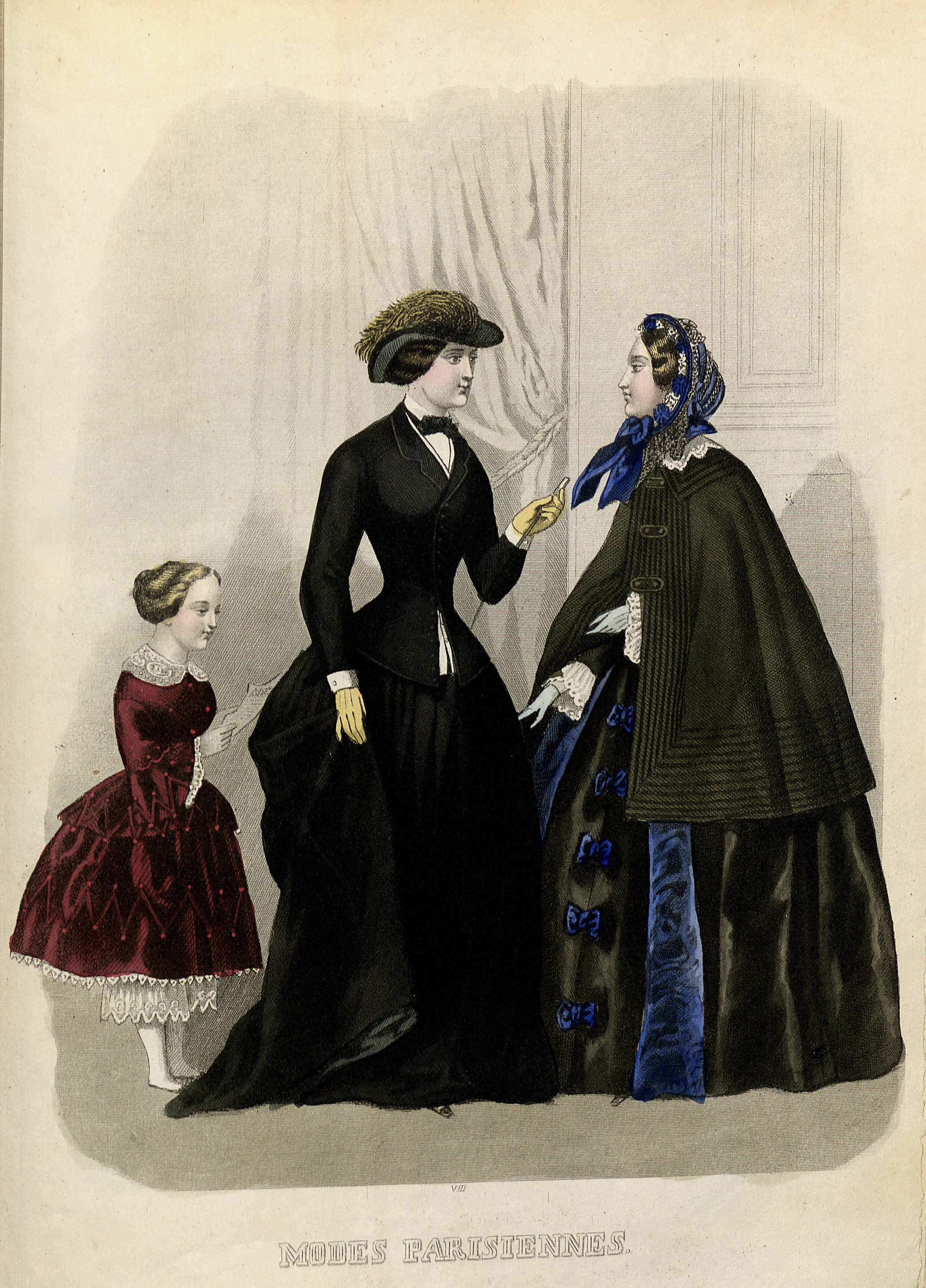
1854 fashion plate, with (left) an early version of the Eugénie hat, which was originally worn for horseriding or travel

The original Eugénie hat was named after Eugénie de Montijo, wife of Napoleon III, whose fashion choices were publicised in fashion sketches and closely scrutinised across Europe and the United States. The design became popular in the 1850s and 1860s, when it was also known as the empress hat. It was characterised by its forward tilt and featured feathers and ribbons. Typically it was made of velvet or felt. Mary Brooks Picken noted that the hat was generally small in its original incarnation, often with the brim turned up on one or both sides, with what were generally ostrich feathers as a trim. It would normally be tilted towards the right. Originally, the hat was worn for horseriding and travelling.

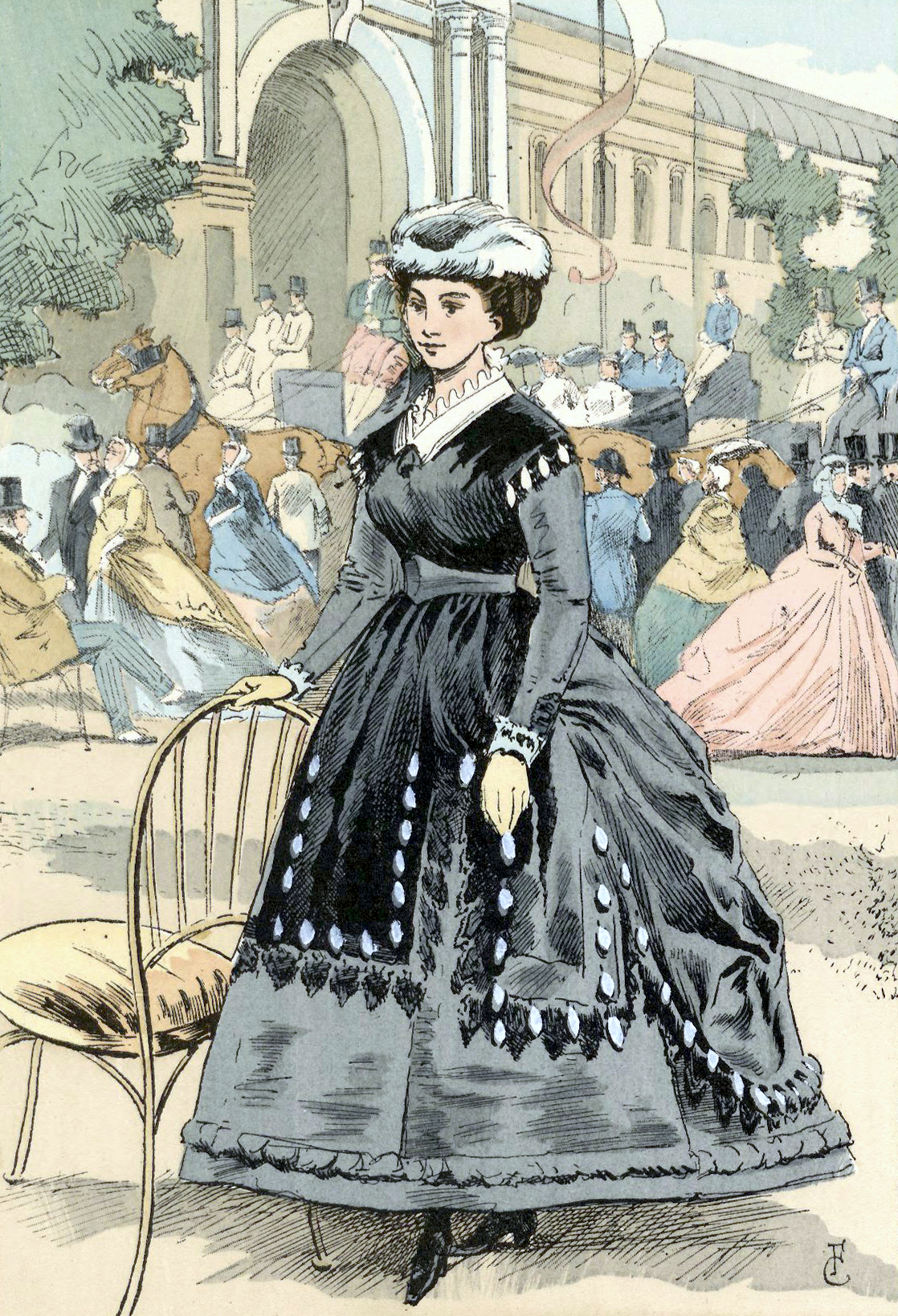
1866 French fashion plate showing a hat with the upturned brim typical of the Eugénie style

The design began in Paris but became known in Britain. It was described in an 1868 fashion article in The Guardian reprinted from the French fashion magazine Le Follet: "There is also the 'Eugenie' in honour of the Empress, in very fine leghorn, with a broad edge inclining over the eyes, trimmed with a bunch of white feathers, an aigrette of roses, an orchid or moss and field flowers. The chapeau 'Eugenie' is not very becoming to all faces: it requires to be worn by a very pretty and stylish lady". Eugenie's fashion choices appeared in influential US publications such as Godey's Lady's Book and it seems likely images of the hat may have been circulated to an American audience. The Metropolitan Museum of Art collection includes a straw hat of 1860 of a similar neat style to the Eugénie hat.

== 1930s revival ==
In 1930, the hat was revived – this is said to have been as a result of a hat created by the MGM designer Adrian and worn by Greta Garbo in the 1930 film Romance. The hat became a talking point in Paris as well as the United States and was even covered in Time. "The Eugenie hat is O.K. but let's draw the line there!" declared a 1931 newsreel in the United States, proceeding to show a parade of young women wearing variations on the design. Another, from the same year, said: "Empress Eugenie hits country by storm – regardless" and proceeded to show a somewhat older parade of wearers, including market traders and a horse. Chicago Tribune declared that many Paris dressmakers were considering a fashion revolution to bring dress into line with the new period-piece hats; it was being whispered, said the paper's Paris correspondent Bettina Bedwell, that bustles and crinolines might be revived. By August of that year, it was reported that a new era of prosperity might be at hand for the garment industry. "Hat and women's wear manufacturers predicted today it would alleviate for a time at least, economic depression in their industries". It was suggested that, for the first time in history, fashion designers were following the lead of milliners who had: "made women wear the hats in defiance of the styles in frocks, with the result that the couturiers have had to fall quickly in line and rush through styles to go with the hats". In Australia, the hat was described as of "postage-stamp size" so that it revealed the back and sides of the hair and featured trims of bright feathers. It was also reported that famous wearers included actresses Peggy Shannon and Lilyan Tashman.

=== Criticism ===
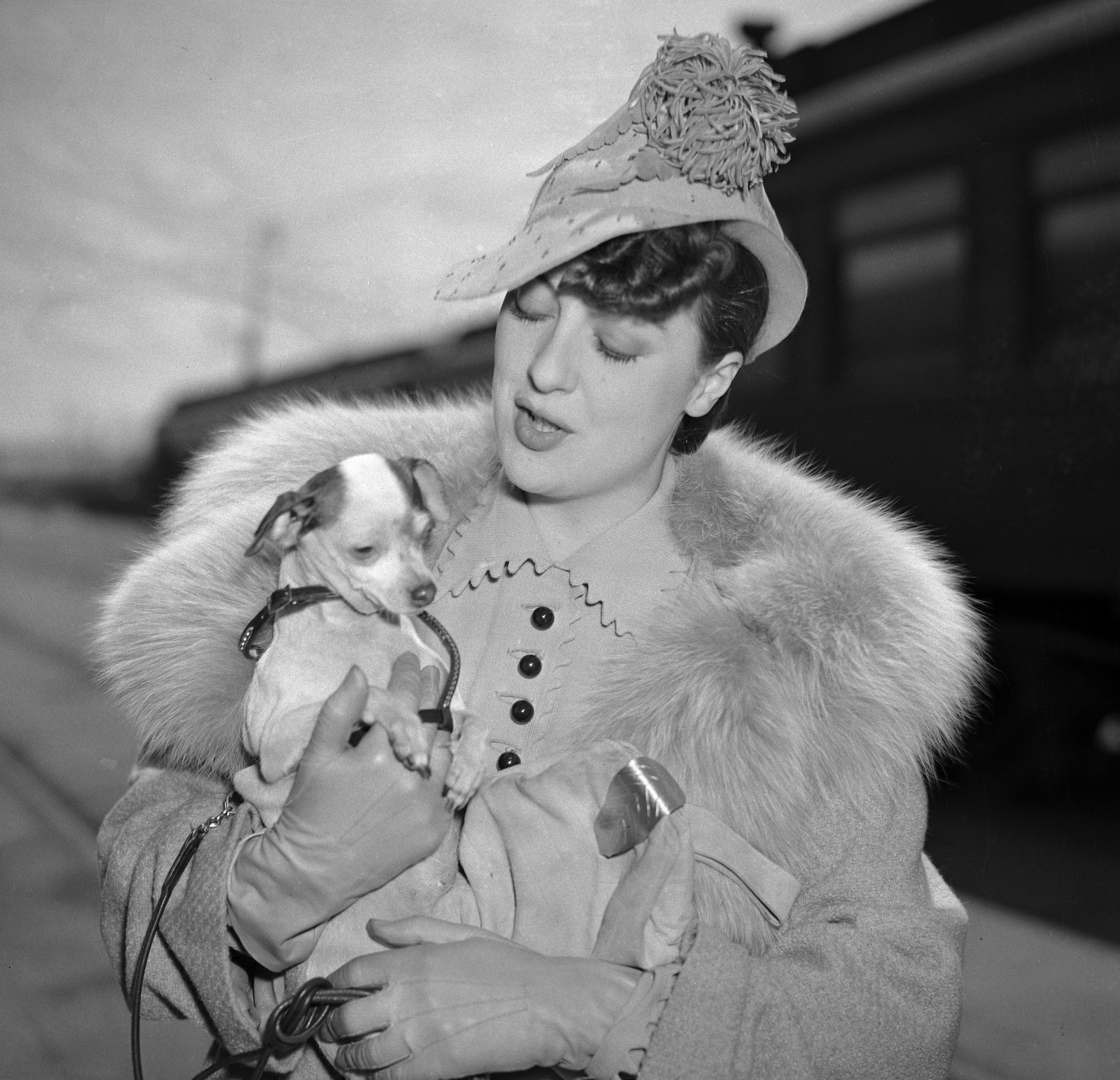
The 'Eugénie influence' could be seen for the following decade in millinery – especially in the angling of hats. This 1937 model was worn by Gypsy Rose Lee.

From the start, the revived Eugénie attracted criticism from some sectors of the press. A correspondent for The Guardian describing the June 1931 Prix de l'Arc de Triomphe race meeting at Longchamp said that the Eugénie was "said to be the latest thing in hats", but concluded it was "hideous" – especially when worn by women with very large faces. The hat was also described as a miss with female customers over a certain weight. "Ostrich plumes may dip beguilingly, but if the wearer has two chins or three, where one ought to be, she is going to look atrocious instead of audacious". Some American newspapers began deriding the Eugénie hat. The Milwaukee Journal ran a feature entitled: "Will Eugenie Hat Improve Morals?" After describing something of the life of the last empress of France, its conclusion was that it would not: "So the wearing of Eugenie's hat the demure little bonnet with an audacious eye dip and ostrich plume ... may be a signal for almost anything in America. For say what you please of its old fashioned charm, Eugenie's hat stirred up a world of trouble for Europe". The Urbana Daily Courier declared the Eugénie hat "overdone" now that so many cheap copies were available in five and ten cent stores, although it noted that subtler, more square-crowned versions by French couturiers such as Jean Patou, with trims of osprey rather than ostrich, offered something different.

In 1932, The Guardian reported on a trend for frocks based around designs by the French Impressionists, adding: "There is no reason why they should look any more ridiculous than the Empress Eugénie hats that every other woman was wearing a few months ago". In 1933, The Times reported that milliners were drawing on both the 18th century and the Second French Empire for inspiration, singling out Suzanne Talbot as showing styles similar to Empress Eugénie's riding hats and designs with trims turned up sharply on one side. A wide variety of materials were being used, including taffetas, straw and grosgrain. A year later, the Eugénie hat was still being adapted as part of new season's millinery designs, but now showing more of women's hairstyles: "Hats are halo-like or sailor-like, but with considerable flatness. The idea is now to show the hair and the Eugenie hats, which are tipped forward over the nose, indicate that more and more hair is expected at the back of the head".

Despite the American and British newspaper predictions of the demise of the Eugénie hat, as The Times noted in 1977 in a review of a book about the designer Adrian, its influence was to permeate fashion for a decade because women continued to tilt their hats low over one eye. The Eugénie hat featured again in the 1938 film Suez, when it was both worn by Loretta Young (playing the role of Eugénie) and displayed prominently on a pedestal in one scene as: "a visual correlative to symbolize Eugenie's vanity and thirst for power".

== See also ==
- List of hat styles
