= Years of Grace =

1930 novel by Margaret Ayer Barnes

- First edition cover
- Author: Margaret Ayer Barnes
- Language: English
- Published: 1930 (Houghton Mifflin)
- Publication place: United States
- Media type: Print (hardback and paperback)

Years of Grace is a 1930 novel by Margaret Ayer Barnes. It won the Pulitzer Prize for the Novel in 1931. Despite this recognition, it is not her best-known work; that honor belongs to Dishonored Lady, a play she co-wrote with Edward Sheldon.

Barnes' alma mater Bryn Mawr College, along with the characters of college presidents M. Carey Thomas and Marion Park, figure prominently in this work. The story, beginning in the 1890s and continuing into the 1930s, chronicles the life of Jane Ward Carver from her teens to age 54. This novel follows many of the same themes as Barnes' other works. Centering on the social manners of upper middle class society, her female protagonists are often traditionalists, struggling to uphold conventional morality in the face of changing social climates.
