= Janet Ayer Fairbank =

American novelist

- Born: Janet Ayer; June 7, 1878; Chicago, Illinois
- Died: December 28, 1951 (aged 73); Wauwautosa, Wisconsin
- Education: University of Chicago
- Occupations: Writer, activist
- Spouse: Kellogg Fairbank (m. 1900)
- Children: 3

Janet Fairbank (née Ayer; June 7, 1878 – December 28, 1951) was an American author and suffragist, socially and politically active in Chicago and a champion of progressive causes.

== Biography ==
Janet Ayer was born in Chicago, Illinois, on June 7, 1878. She was the older sister of Pulitzer Prize-winning author Margaret Ayer Barnes.

Fairbank attended the University of Chicago and in 1900 married the lawyer Kellogg Fairbank, the son of industrialist N. K. Fairbank. They had three children including the operatic singer Janet Fairbank (1903–1947).

Fairbank published her first novel, Home, in 1910. She wrote short stories, articles, and seven novels.

She was active in politics; a delegate to the Democratic National Convention from Illinois in 1924 and 1932, and a national committeewoman for the Illinois Democratic party from 1924 through 1928.

Fairbank died in Wauwatosa, Wisconsin, on 28 December 1951, aged 73.

== Bibliography ==
- Home (1910)
- The Cortlandts of Washington Square (1923)
- The Smiths (1925) (runner-up for the Pulitzer Prize)
- Idle Hands (1927) (short stories)
- The Lion's Den (1930)
- The Bright Land (1932)
- Rich Man, Poor Man (1936)
