= Janet Fairbank =

American opera singer

- Janet Fairbank, from a 1923 publication
- Born: June 18, 1903; Chicago, Illinois, U.S.
- Died: September 25, 1947 (aged 44); Chicago, Illinois, U.S.
- Occupation: Opera singer
- Mother: Janet Ayer Fairbank
- Relatives: N. K. Fairbank (grandfather)

Janet Fairbank (June 18, 1903 – September 25, 1947) was an American operatic singer.

She was the Chicago-born daughter of novelist and suffragette Janet Ayer Fairbank and Kellogg Fairbank, the son of industrialist N. K. Fairbank and the niece of Pulitzer Prize–winning novelist Margaret Ayer Barnes. She graduated from Radcliffe College in 1923.

A soprano, her debut in Chicago in 1931 was followed by a debut in Europe in 1932 and an initial appearance in opera (as Zerlina in Don Giovanni) in 1933. She appeared with the San Carlo Opera Company in Chicago in 1934 and with the Chicago Opera in 1934-35 and in 1940-41. She also appeared with the Civic Orchestra of Chicago, the Grant Park Orchestra, and other companies. She was also a patron of contemporary music, and provided encouragement and support to numerous recognized and aspiring composers including Virgil Thomson, David Diamond, Francis Poulenc, Benjamin Britten, Lou Harrison, Olivier Messiaen, Ned Rorem, Paul Bowles, Gottfried von Einem, and John Cage.

== Death ==
Janet Fairbank died in her native Chicago in 1947, aged 44, from leukemia.
