= Letty Lynton =

1932 film directed by Clarence Brown

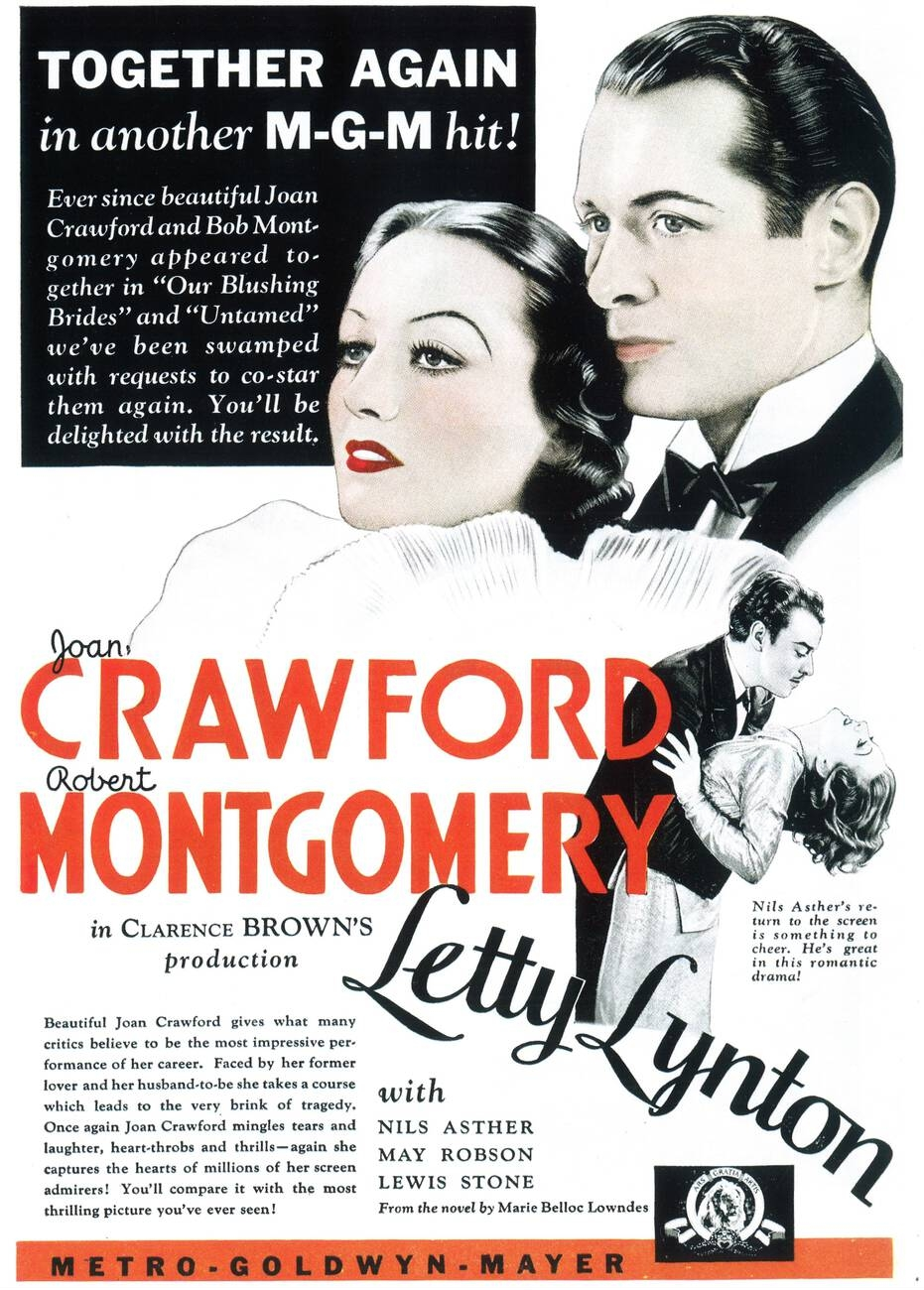
- Theatrical release poster
- Directed by: Clarence Brown
- Written by: Wanda Tuchock (adaptation)
- Screenplay by: John Meehan
- Based on: Letty Lynton by Marie Belloc Lowndes
- Produced by: Hunt Stromberg (uncredited)
- Starring: Joan Crawford; Robert Montgomery; Nils Asther; Lewis Stone; May Robson
- Cinematography: Oliver T. Marsh
- Edited by: Conrad A. Nervig
- Distributed by: Metro-Goldwyn-Mayer
- Release date: May 14, 1932 (United States)
- Running time: 84 minutes
- Country: United States
- Language: English
- Budget: $347,000
- Box office: $1,172,000

Letty Lynton is a 1932 American pre-Code drama film starring Joan Crawford, Robert Montgomery and Nils Asther. The film was directed by Clarence Brown and based on the 1931 novel of the same name by Marie Adelaide Belloc Lowndes; the novel is based on a historical murder allegedly committed by Madeleine Smith. Crawford plays the title character, who gets away with murder in a tale of love and blackmail.

The film has since become famous partially due to its unavailability after a 1936 court case. It is remembered for the "Letty Lynton dress" designed by Adrian: a white cotton organdy gown with large ruffled sleeves, puffed at the shoulder. Macy's department store copied the dress in 1932, and it sold over 50,000 replicas nationwide.

== Plot ==
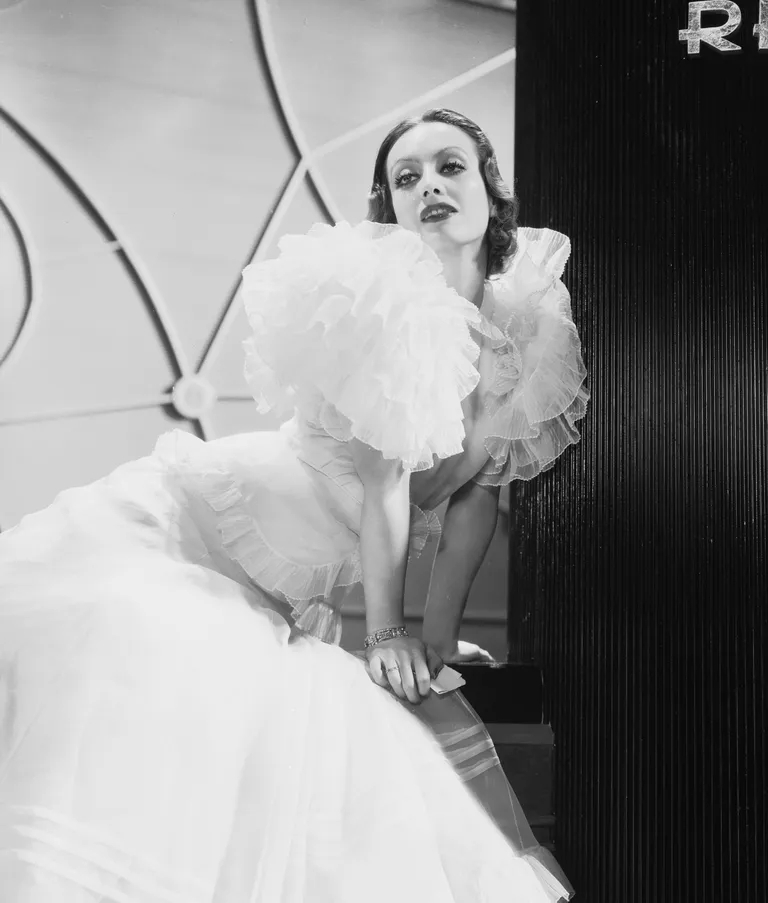
Publicity photo of Joan Crawford wearing Adrian's Letty Lynton gown

New York City socialite Letty Lynton has been living in Montevideo, Uruguay, and wants to end her affair with Emile Renaul. After several failed attempts to leave him, the only way she can is by leaving the country. On a steamship to the United States, Letty sees wealthy American, Jerry Darrow, and she immediately is attracted to him and he to her. Both unknowingly bribe the purser to be seated for meals at the same table. At dinner, their attraction increases, and after two weeks at sea, they have fallen in love.

On Christmas Eve, the captain gives passengers their telegrams as gifts in a game. Letty has none, being alone on the hasty trip home, and Jerry feigns the same, the gesture touches Letty and the two kiss for the first time. She starts to believe she can start her life over and when Jerry comes to her cabin to propose, she accepts.

In New York, Letty is shocked to see Emile waiting for her on the dock. Arranging to meet Jerry later, she leaves the ship before him and learns from Emile that he flew from South America to see her and plans to take her back with him. After she leaves Emile on the docks with her trunk, Letty hurries home to speak with her mother. Jerry phones telling her that they have been invited to his parents home in Upstate New York and will leave that night, after Letty tells her mother about the engagement.

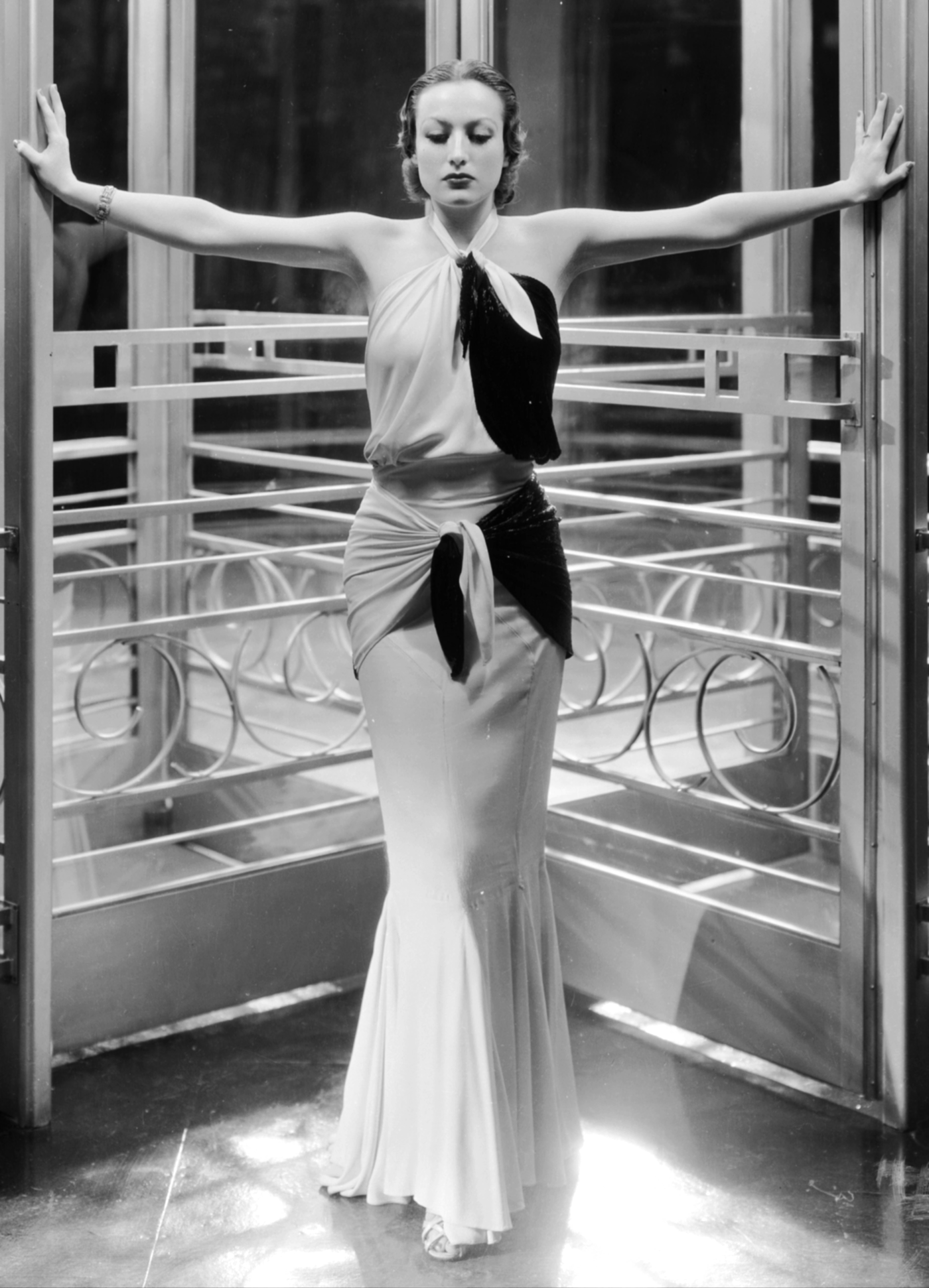
Publicity photo of Crawford wearing a dress by Adrian

Letty's mother, Mrs. Lynton, is an embittered woman who shows no affection for Letty, whom she regards as irresponsible. Soon, Emile arrives to have the talk Letty dodged on the pier, now having read about the engagement in the newspapers. He warns her to meet him in his hotel room that night or he will show Jerry her explicit love letters. Letty is revolted and resolves to commit suicide rather than spend her life with Emile. She clings to a slim hope: convince him to give her the letters or let her go.

She calls Jerry to change their departure to the next day, then goes to Emile's hotel, taking a bottle of poison with her. She first tries to ask for a chance at happiness, explaining how it is her one shot at real love, but Emile will have none of it—stating she can never be anyone's but his. Letty then begs for her letters, but he refuses and tells her that their affair will only be over when he says so. While Emile answers a knock at the door and talks to a waiter, Letty puts the poison in her champagne glass, planning to drink it herself, choosing death over Emile.

When Emile returns, however, he strikes her then picks up her glass drinking the poison, as a shocked Letty mutely watches. He then grabs up Letty and he carries her to the bedroom, attempting sex, when the poison starts to take effect. As he dies, she screams hysterically that she's glad he's dying, even if she hangs for doing it. She then cleans up fingerprints in the room and leaves.

The next day, soon after Letty and Jerry have arrived at the home of his parents, a police detective from New York arrives looking for Letty and requests that she come with him. Jerry and Letty, along with Mrs. Lynton and Letty's maid, go with him to see District Attorney John J. Haney. He begins questioning everyone and accuses Letty of murder, confronting her with the letters.

Letty admits that she went to see Emile, but Jerry interrupts by saying that he and Letty spent the night together at his apartment after she left Emile's, and that he knew all about the letters. Mrs. Lynton corroborates Jerry's story by saying that she followed Letty to Jerry's apartment. She also says that she overheard Emile say he would kill himself if Letty did not return to him. Letty's maid, Miranda, also corroborates the story, after which Haney says that the case is closed and Letty is free to go.

== Cast ==
- Joan Crawford as Letty Lynton
- Robert Montgomery as Jerry Darrow
- Nils Asther as Emile Renaul
- Lewis Stone as District Attorney Haney
- May Robson as Mrs. Lynton, Letty's Mother
- Louise Closser Hale as Miranda, Letty's Maid
- Emma Dunn as Mrs. Darrow, Jerry's Mother
- Walter Walker as Mr. Darrow, Jerry's Father

== Reception ==
=== Box office ===
According to MGM records, Letty Lynton earned $754,000 in the U.S. and Canada and $418,000 in other markets, resulting in an estimated profit of $390,000.

=== Critical reaction ===
Mordaunt Hall of The New York Times wrote: "It is a feature with beautiful photography and good direction, but most of its incidents are implausible and the dialogue is often of the synthetic variety [...] Clarence Brown, the director, pays too much attention to his photographic effects and not enough to the necessary psychology of the characters or the plausibility of the incidents. Both the comedy and the drama are forced. Miss Crawford gives an efficient portrayal, and Mr. Montgomery does capital work in his role."

Variety applauded Crawford's performance, but felt some aspects of the story ("numerous little intimate and bits designed to build up the love interest" between Letty Lynton and Jerry Darrow) slowed down the film. However, they acknowledged in the last act, "the picture gets out of its occasional ruts and builds to a strong finish."

Harrison's Reports wrote: "Though well produced, Letty Lynton is a demoralizing picture, for the heroine is shown poisoning a man she had been living with, and she gets away with it [...] The tone of the picture is very unpleasant. This is accentuated by the fact that Miss Crawford's makeup is terrible; her face appears waxen."

Photoplay wrote: "The gripping, simple manner in which this picture unfolds stands it squarely among the best of the month...Joan Crawford as Letty is at her best. Nils Asther is a fascinating villain. Robert Montgomery gives a skillful performance...The direction, plus a strong cast, make Letty Lynton well worth seeing."

Motion Picture Herald noted: "Almost everything one can wish for in entertainment has been injected into this superbly acted and directed production. The gowns which Miss Crawford wears will be the talk of your town for weeks after...and how she wears them!"

== Legal status ==
Letty Lynton had been unavailable since a federal District Court ruled on January 17, 1936, that the script used by MGM followed too closely the play Dishonored Lady (1930) by Edward Sheldon and Margaret Ayer Barnes without acquiring the rights to the play or giving credit. On July 28, 1939, the Second Circuit awarded one-fifth of the net of Letty Lynton to plaintiffs Sheldon and Ayer Barnes in their plagiarism and copyright infringement action against MGM. This case was incorrectly said to be the first copyright decision ever to direct the apportionment of profits on the relative basis as in patent suits where a patent has been appropriated. A previous similar decision had been made in 1921 in the case of the plagiarism case regarding Al Jolson's 1920 song "Avalon".

MGM petitioned the United States Supreme Court to overturn the Court of Appeals ruling entirely, and the playwrights cross-petitioned. They argued that because the questions arising in the suit were predicated solely upon the copyright laws of the U.S., the court of appeals had erred in relying on principles of patent law to apportion the damages, rather than grant the plaintiffs 100% of MGM's profit. The Supreme Court accepted the playwrights' petition but in 1940 unanimously affirmed the Second Circuit's decision that granted them one fifth, not all of the profits. As a result of the finding of copyright violation, however, the film has remained largely unavailable save for some bootlegged copies.

In 1947, United Artists released the film Dishonored Lady, starring Hedy Lamarr and directed by Robert Stevenson, based on the play by Sheldon and Ayer Barnes.

=== Restoration and re-release ===
The 1930 copyright to the play expired in 2025, resolving the ownership dispute. The copyright for the 1932 film itself is set to expire in 2027. Spurred by this, Crawford's grandson, Casey LaLonde, argued that it was legally safe to screen the film, and the Warner Archive Collection, which presently owns the film, restored it in 4K resolution. LaLonde credited George Feltenstein, a Warner Bros. Discovery library historian, with making the restoration possible, and added that there are plans to release the 4K restoration on Blu-ray.

On April 8, 2026, it was announced that a new 4K restoration of Letty Lynton would premiere at the TCM Classic Film Festival. The restored film premiered at the Egyptian Theatre in Hollywood on May 1, 2026, and was later released on Blu-ray and DVD on June 30. It was also included during the 2026 "Big & Loud" film festival at New York's Paris Theater, where film historian Farran Smith Nehme introduced the screening.
