= Adrian (costume designer) =

American costume designer (1903-1959)

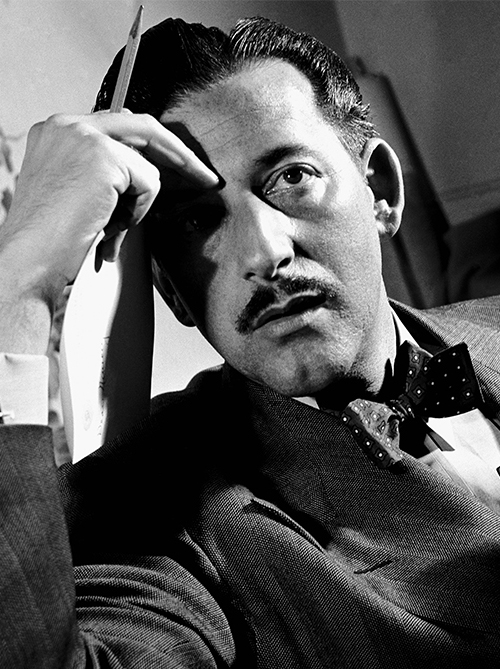
- Adrian in 1944
- Born: Adrian Adolph Greenburg; March 3, 1903; Naugatuck, Connecticut, U.S.
- Died: September 13, 1959 (aged 56); Hollywood, Los Angeles, California, U.S.
- Resting place: Hollywood Forever Cemetery
- Occupations: Costume designer, fashion designer
- Years active: 1922–1959
- Spouse: Janet Gaynor (m. 1939)
- Children: 1

Adrian Adolph Greenburg (March 3, 1903 – September 13, 1959), also known mononymously as Adrian, was an American costume and fashion designer. Widely regarded as one of the most influential figures in Hollywood's Golden Age, he was usually credited onscreen with the phrase "Gowns by Adrian". Early in his career, he chose the professional name Gilbert Adrian, a combination of his father's forename and his own.

Adrian began his career making costumes for Irving Berlin's Music Box Revues before being brought to Hollywood by Rudolph Valentino to work on his films. After creating costumes for Cecil B. DeMille's films, he became the head costume designer at Metro-Goldwyn-Mayer from 1928 to 1941, where he created wardrobes for several stars, including Greta Garbo, Joan Crawford, Jean Harlow, Katharine Hepburn, and Norma Shearer. Adrian was especially celebrated for his sophisticated and dramatic evening gown designs, a talent exemplified in Letty Lynton (1932), Dinner at Eight (1933), and The Women (1939). He is perhaps best known today for his work on the Technicolor classic The Wizard of Oz (1939), for which he custom-designed the signature red-sequined ruby slippers worn by Judy Garland, one of the most enduring costume designs in cinema history.

In 1941, Adrian left MGM to establish his own fashion house, Adrian, Ltd., seeking greater creative freedom. He designed both couture and ready-to-wear fashions, winning a Coty Award in 1945 for his work. After retiring in 1952 due to declining health, Adrian briefly returned to costume design in 1958 and was working on the Broadway musical Camelot when he died of a stroke in 1959. He was posthumously awarded the Tony Award for Best Costume Design in a Musical in 1960.

== Early life and career ==
Adrian Adolph Greenberg was born on March 3, 1903, in Naugatuck, Connecticut, to Gilbert Greenberg and Helena Greenberg (née Pollak). Both sides of the family were Jewish. His paternal grandparents were from Russia, while his maternal grandparents were from Bohemia and Germany. Adrian showed artistic ability from an early age. His father owned a millinery shop and drew well, while his mother painted in oils, and Adrian began sketching and painting as a child. By his early teens, he was producing imaginative illustrations inspired by the stories of Edgar Allan Poe. Recognizing his talent, his parents enrolled him at the Parsons School of Fine and Applied Arts in New York when he was 17 in 1920, where he received formal training and access to professional materials.

After demonstrating strong promise at Parsons, Adrian was transferred to the school's Paris campus in 1922. While there, he attracted the attention of Irving Berlin, who noticed a dress Adrian had designed for a fellow student and worn to a Grand Prix Ball. Impressed, Berlin asked to see additional work and subsequently brought Adrian back to New York, where he was contracted to design costumes for the Music Box Revues in 1922 and 1923.

While still working as a theater costume designer in New York, Adrian was commissioned by Alma Rubens to create custom gowns for her appearance in The Rejected Woman (1924).

== Hollywood years ==
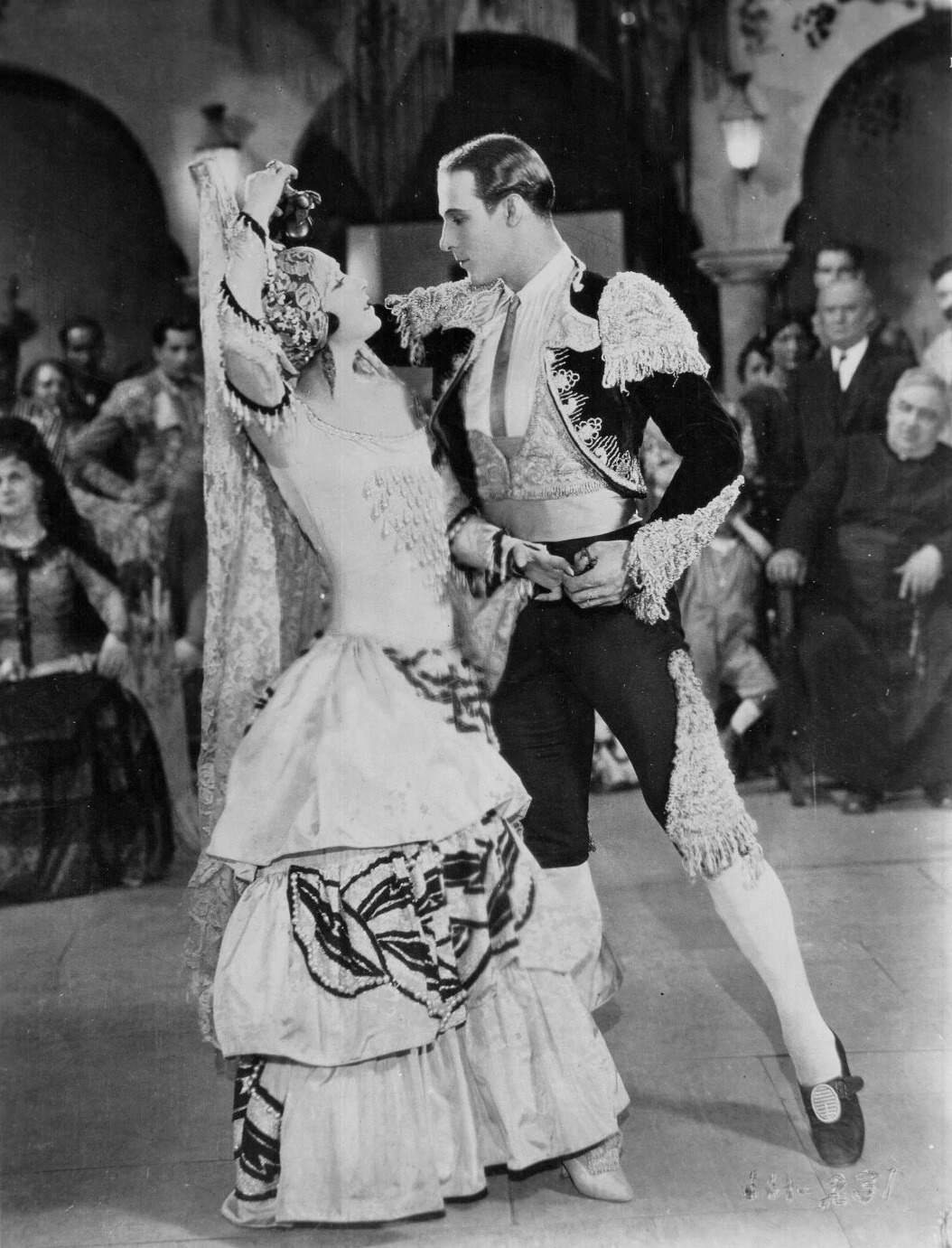
Rudolph Valentino wearing a Spanish toreador costume designed by Adrian in A Sainted Devil (1924)

Adrian's theatrical designs drew the attention of Natacha Rambova, the wife of Rudolph Valentino, who signed him to a contract during the production of A Sainted Devil (1924) at the Astoria Studios in Queens, New York. He was responsible for creating a Spanish toreador outfit for Valentino. Valentino was so taken with Adrian's work that, when he returned to Hollywood, he brought Adrian with him. Adrian subsequently collaborated with Rambova on the uncompleted production The Hooded Falcon.

At the age of 21, Adrian began to gain press recognition for his designs and was described as "a youthful Poiret of films" and "the infant costume designer." Production difficulties on The Hooded Falcon led Ritz-Carlton Pictures to redirect Valentino to Cobra (1925), which became Adrian's first completely realized work on screen. After The Hooded Falcon was abandoned and Valentino and Rambova separated, Adrian continued designing for both independently. He designed the costumes for Rambova's film What Price Beauty? (1928), which was shot in 1925. He also created the costumes for Valentino's last two United Artists films, The Eagle (1925) and The Son of the Sheik (1926).

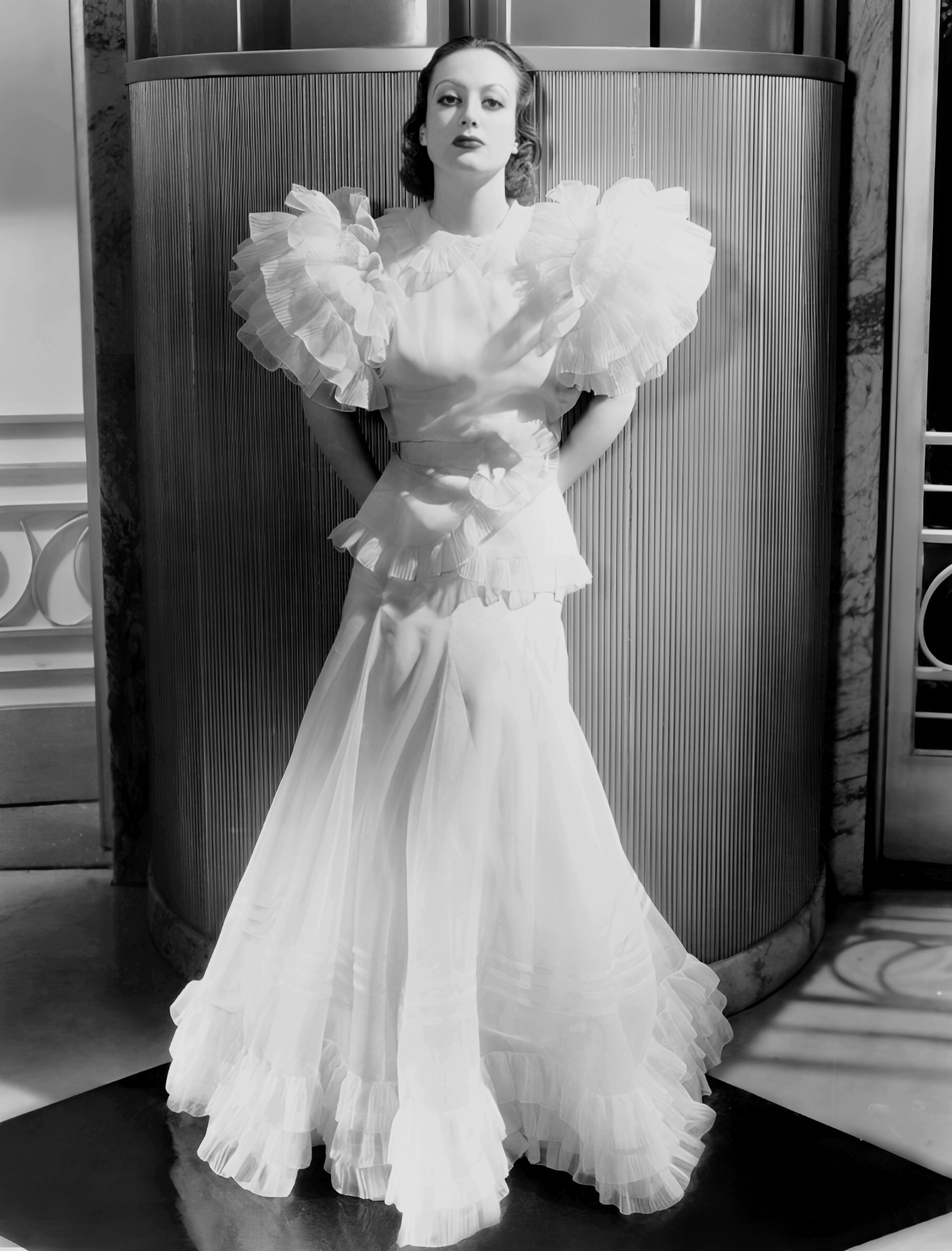
Joan Crawford wearing the Adrian-designed "Letty Lynton dress," 1932

By this point, Adrian's talent had attracted the attention of several prominent figures. Mae Murray, a former Ziegfeld Follies performer, had him design her gown for the film The Merry Widow (1925). As Adrian established himself in Hollywood, he rented a house in the hills above Hollywood Boulevard and went on to design costumes for Constance Talmadge in Her Sister from Paris (1925).

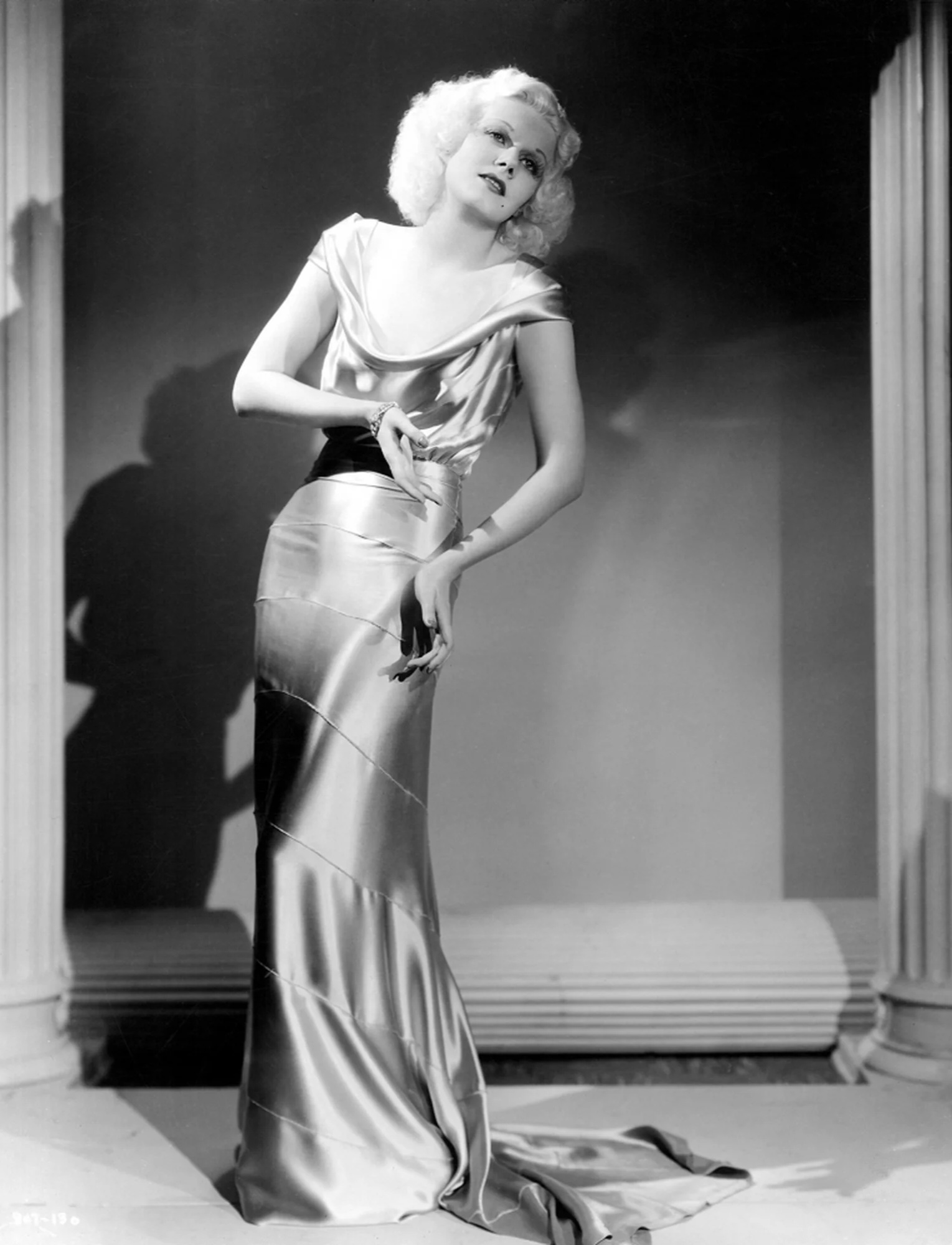
Jean Harlow wearing a dress designed by Adrian for Reckless (1935)

That year, Adrian gained further notice when Sid Grauman presented his designs in a prologue preceding Charlie Chaplin's The Gold Rush (1925) at Grauman's Egyptian Theatre. Cecil B. DeMille, who had seen the presentation, authorized his designer Mitchell Leisen to hire Adrian for The Volga Boatman (1926) when Leisen was unable to manage both costume and set design duties. In 1926, Adrian designed Corinne Griffith's wardrobe and staged his first fashion-show sequence in Mademoiselle Modiste for First National Pictures.

Adrian worked under contract for DeMille Pictures Corporation, designing costumes for Leatrice Joy and Phyllis Haver, and contributing to The King of Kings (1927). When DeMille moved to Metro-Goldwyn-Mayer in 1928, Adrian was provisionally hired as a costume designer for MGM. After a few months, he signed a contract as the studio's head costume designer for over 250 films, a position he held until 1941. He played a central role in shaping the studio's luxurious house style, working closely with its leading stars and tailoring costumes to reinforce their screen personas. His designs for film starlets popularized Hollywood-inspired fashion trends among American women.

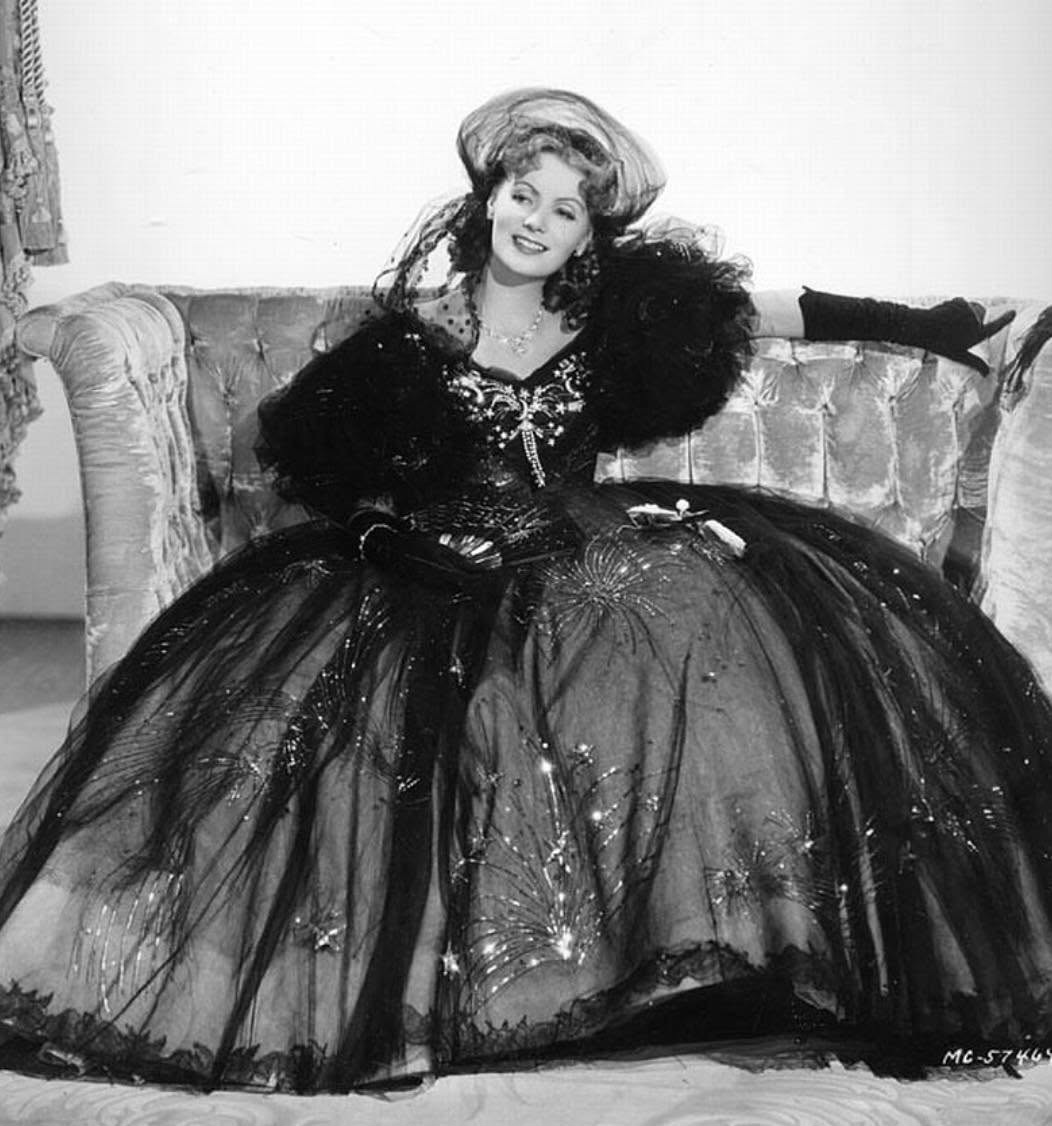
Greta Garbo wearing a dress designed by Adrian for Camille (1936)

At MGM, Adrian met Greta Garbo, who became one of his most important muses. Shortly after he joined the studio, it was announced that he would design her gowns. Their film collaboration began with A Woman of Affairs (1928) and went on to define much of his work in the 1930s. The Eugénie hat he created for the film Romance (1930) became a sensation and influenced millinery styles. His costumes for Queen Christina (1933) blended regal authority with androgynous tailoring, while the pillbox hat he made for The Painted Veil was widely copied, and his designs for Camille (1936) emphasized romantic elegance. Reflecting on their collaboration during his MGM tenure, Adrian said, "Greta Garbo is responsible for invention. She has a great love of the unusual and startling. What the ordinary woman likes has no appeal to her. Because she is interested only in the purely creative, and is an eccentric in her lively curiosity, she is a fascinating woman to work with."

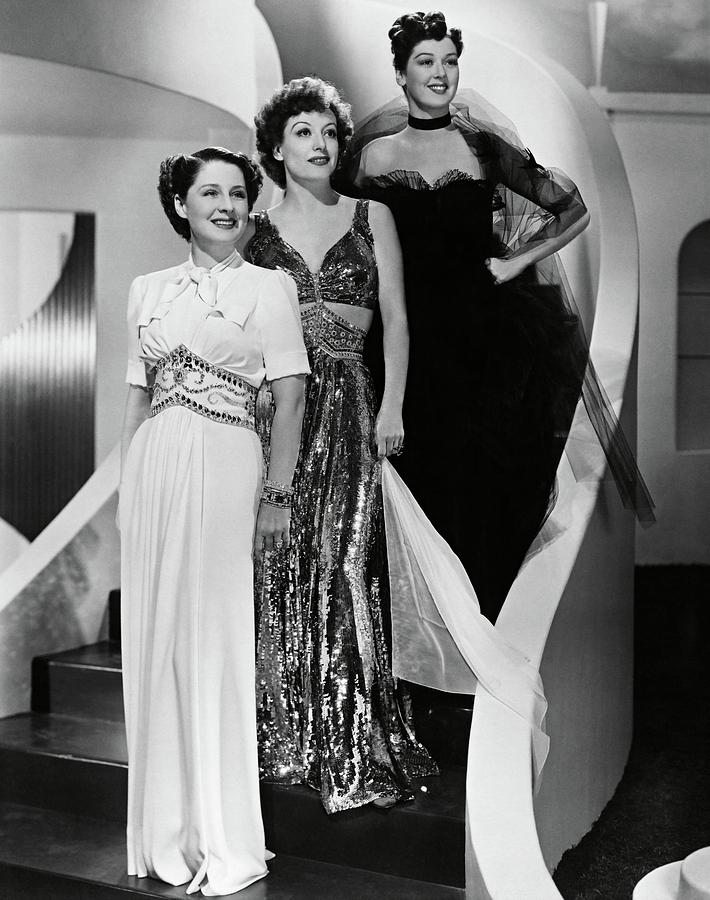
Norma Shearer, Joan Crawford, and Rosalind Russell wearing dresses by Adrian in The Women (1939)

Adrian is credited with transforming Joan Crawford's screen persona and elevating her to a fashion icon in the 1930s. His designs for Crawford in Letty Lynton (1932) featured the "Letty Lynton dress," a white cotton organdy gown with dramatic ruffled sleeves. The dress was copied by Macy's department store and reportedly sold more than 50,000 replicas nationwide. The same year, he also designed Crawford's wardrobe for Grand Hotel (1932), followed by Today We Live (1933) and Dancing Lady (1933), further cementing her image as a trendsetter. Crawford was so fond of a bias-cut silk crepe gown with gold accents that Adrian made for Sadie Mckee (1934) that it also found its way into her wardrobe for Chained (1934) later that year. They collaborated on several more films for over a decade.

Adrian also helped define the screen image of Jean Harlow in the 1930s. He designed her wardrobe for her box-office hits, including Red-Headed Woman (1932), Dinner at Eight (1933)—notably featuring the much-discussed ostrich-feather negligee—as well as Bombshell (1933), Reckless (1935), and China Seas (1935). His sleek satin gowns and sharply tailored ensembles helped define Harlow's platinum-blonde screen persona and projected a distinctly modern sophistication.

Adrian was also acclaimed for the period costumes of Romeo and Juliet (1936), the extravagant costumes of The Great Ziegfeld (1936), and the opulent gowns of Marie Antoinette (1938). Adrian insisted on the finest materials and workmanship for the execution of his designs, cultivating fabric manufacturers in Europe and New York.

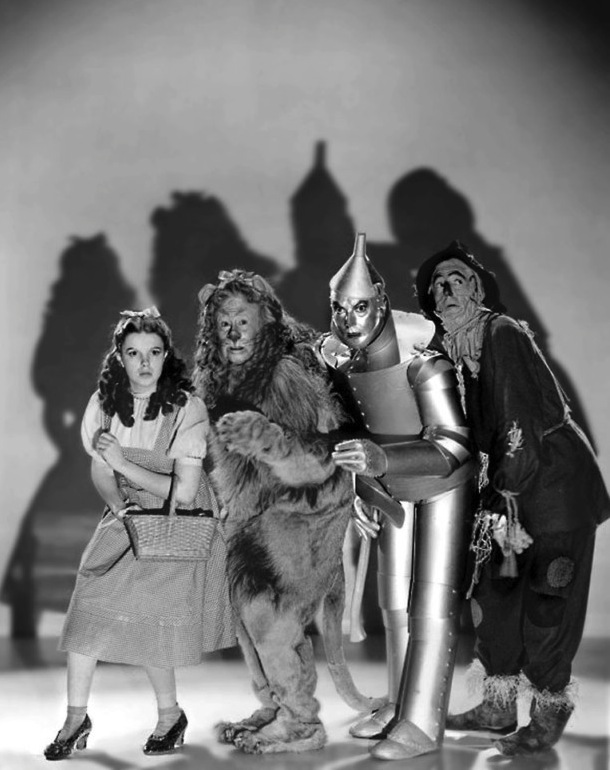
Adrian's costume designs for The Wizard of Oz (1939), L–R: Judy Garland, Bert Lahr, Ray Bolger, and Jack Haley

By the late 1930s, Adrian was widely recognized for his mastery of evening gowns, exemplified by his work on The Women (1939), an all-female cast starring Norma Shearer, Joan Crawford, and Rosalind Russell. Though filmed in black and white, The Women includes a Technicolor fashion show of Adrian's designs. His most celebrated work is for the musical fantasy The Wizard of Oz (1939), for which he designed the film's costumes, including Dorothy's red-sequined ruby slippers worn by Judy Garland, now among the most iconic costumes in cinema history. Near the end of his MGM tenure, Adrian designed the costumes for Ziegfeld Girl (1941), a film remembered for Hedy Lamarr's elaborate celestial-themed gown and headdress, which remains one of Old Hollywood's most emulated looks.

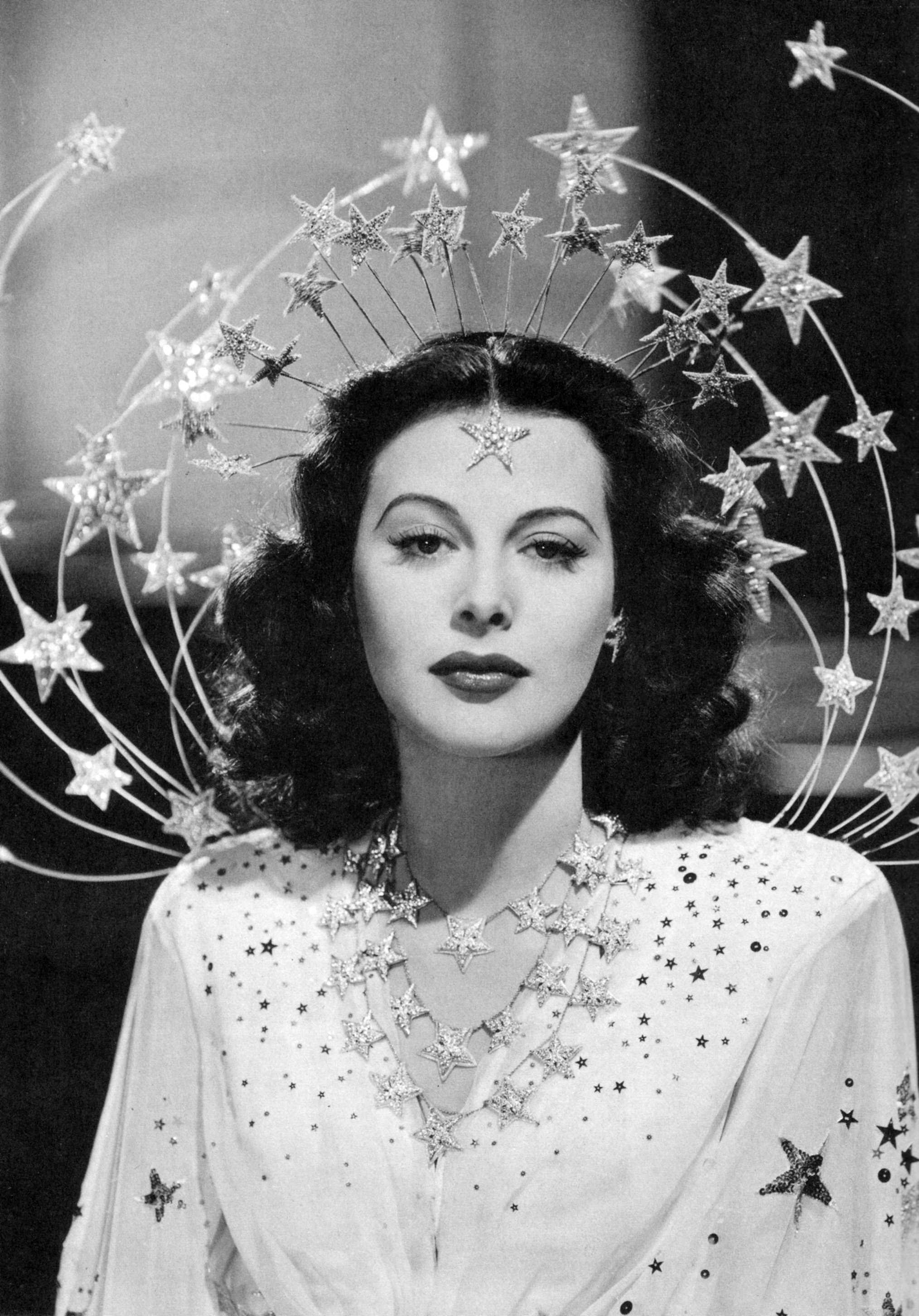
Hedy Lamarr wearing a costume designed by Adrian for Ziegfeld Girl (1941)

After considering a departure from MGM for more than a year, Adrian decided to leave the studio in 1941 amid budget cuts caused by the Great Depression and changes in public taste. Tensions escalated during preproduction of Two-Faced Woman in April 1941, when Adrian clashed with director George Cukor, producer Bernard Hyman, and MGM head Louis B. Mayer over the styling of Greta Garbo's costumes. He notified MGM of his decision on July 16, 1941.

Although his last working day was initially set for August 15, Adrian remained to complete ongoing projects and stayed on the payroll until September 5, 1941, when his three-year contract expired. His departure surprised Mayer. Adrian was succeeded by Robert Kalloch, whose designs closely echoed his predecessor's style, and soon afterward Adrian opened his own fashion firm.

Adrian continued to design fashions for select film projects during the 1940s, most notably Mildred Pierce (1945) and Humoresque (1946). For both films, he created wardrobes for Crawford that emphasized her shoulders with shoulder pads, helping to popularize a sharply structured silhouette that became a fashion trend of the era. He returned to MGM in 1952 for one film, Lovely to Look At.

== Adrian, Ltd. ==
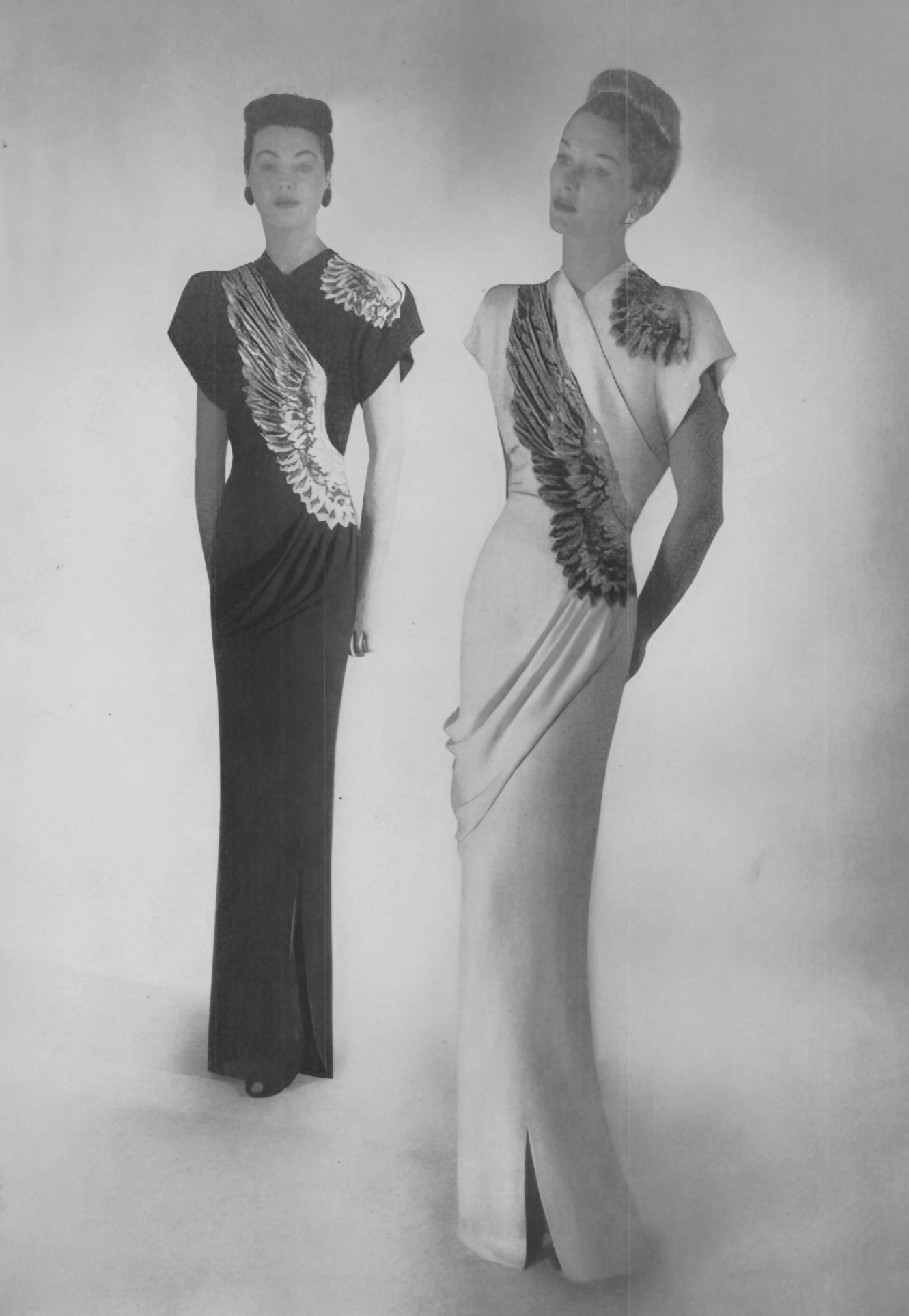
"Wings of Victory" gowns by Adrian, 1945

In 1942, Adrian established Adrian, Ltd., at 233, North Beverly Drive, Beverly Hills, in the building formerly occupied by the Victor Hugo restaurant. He had been courted by retailers to design for public sale but rebuffed those offers.

He often worked with textile designer Pola Stout, in a famous collaboration that began in the 1940s. Adrian's fashion line helped fill the void left by Paris couture houses, which were unable to export garments during the German occupation of France in World War II. American women responded to Adrian's clean-lined designs, and he exerted a strong influence on American fashion until the late 1940s.

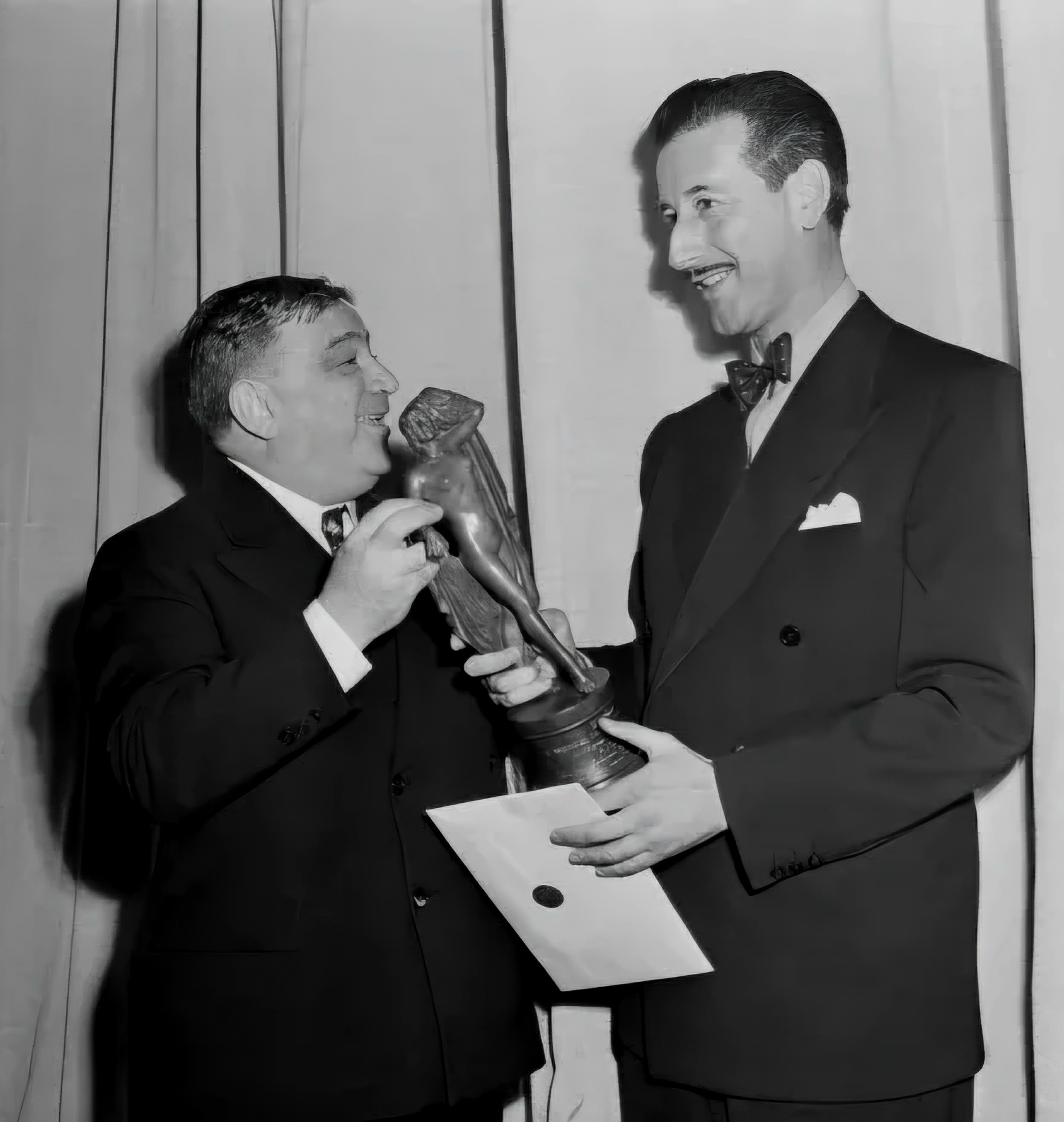
Fiorello La Guardia and Adrian during the Coty Awards, 1945

In 1945, Adrian won the Coty American Fashion Critics' Award for his designs. Accepting the honor, he remarked that receiving such recognition was especially meaningful during wartime America, calling it a "great privilege." Reporting on the presentation, The New York Times noted Adrian's belief that fashion would become international after the war and praised the thirty-two designs shown as distinctly American in character—bold, individualistic, and confident in their use of color and form. They highlighted his signature tailoring, particularly the broad but carefully balanced shoulder line, which created a strong yet slender silhouette.

Adrian was stricken with a heart attack in 1952. Because he never assigned work to assistants, preferring to do all drafts and designs himself, the business could not be continued under his name. Consequently, he was forced to close Adrian, Ltd.

== Later career and death ==
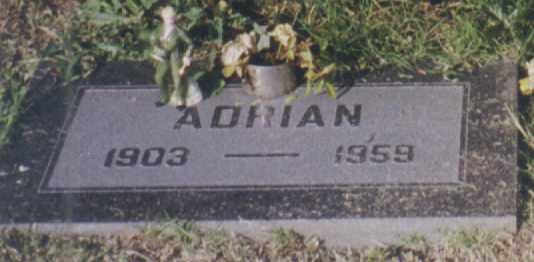
Adrian's grave at Hollywood Forever Cemetery

In 1958, Adrian came out of retirement to design costumes for At the Grand, a musical version of the 1932 film Grand Hotel that starred Paul Muni and Viveca Lindfors and played only in Los Angeles and San Francisco.

In 1959, Adrian was hired to design costumes for the upcoming Broadway musical Camelot. While at work on this project, Adrian suffered a cerebral hemorrhage on September 12, 1959. His wife and son rushed home from New York but arrived too late. He died the following morning at California Hospital in Los Angeles and was buried two days later at Hollywood Forever Cemetery.

He was posthumously awarded the Tony Award for Best Costume Design in a Musical in 1960.

== Personal life ==
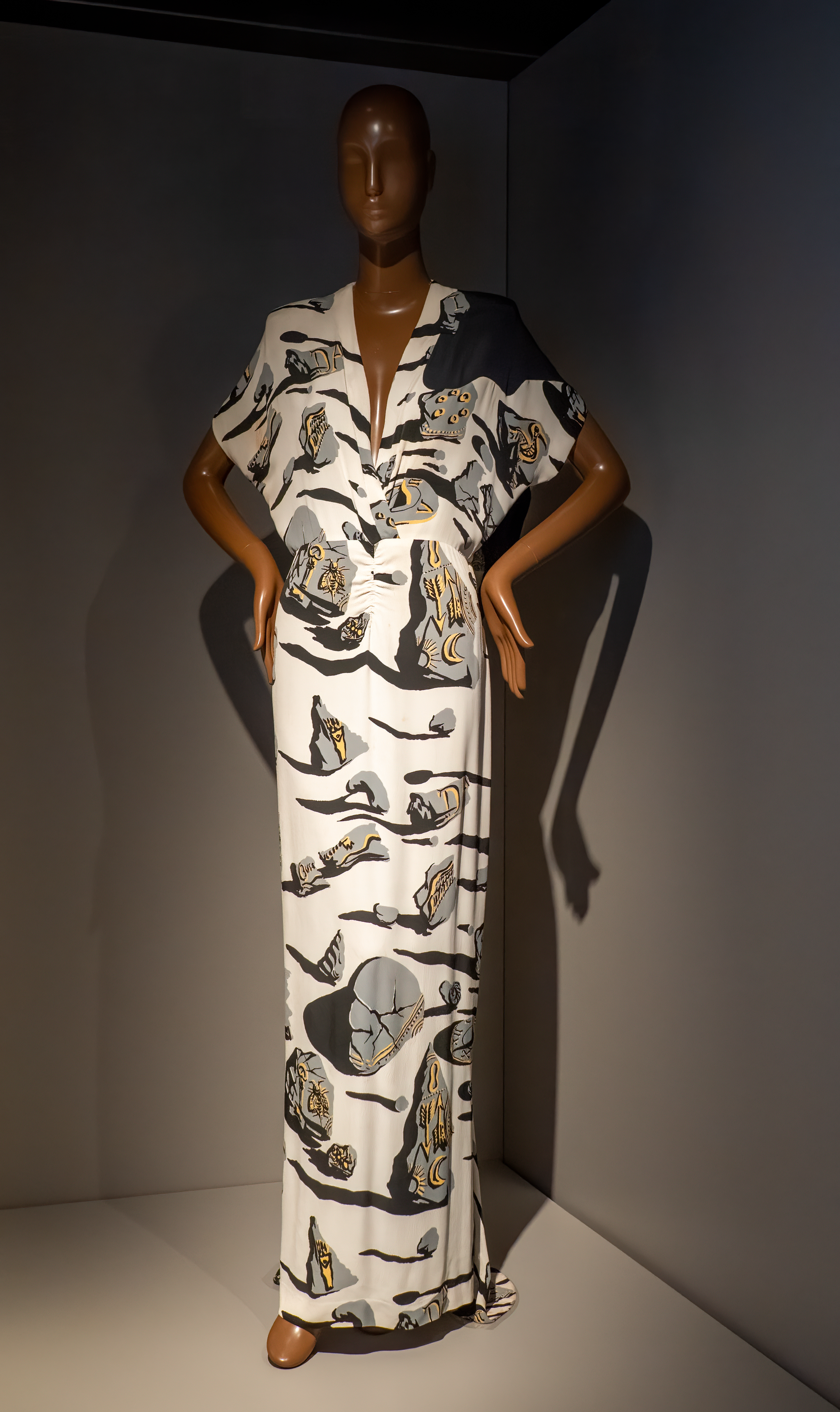
Adrian dress with imagery created by Salvador Dali in 1947 on display at FIT's Dress, Dreams, & Desire: Fashion and Psychoanalysis exhibition, 2025

Adrian married actress Janet Gaynor on August 14, 1939. This relationship has been called a lavender marriage, since Adrian was recognized as gay within the film community while Gaynor was rumored to be a lesbian or bisexual. Both Adrian and Gaynor went on record to say they were happily married, and they remained so until his death in 1959. They had one son, Robin (born July 6, 1940).

Adrian and Gaynor purchased a ranch called fazenda in Anápolis, in the state of Goiás, in the interior of Brazil. They spent a few years developing it, frequently in the company of their friends Richard Halliday and Mary Martin.

== Awards ==
In 1945, Adrian received the Coty American Fashion Critics' Award, and he was posthumously awarded the Tony Award for Best Costume Design in a Musical in 1960 for Camelot. He was never nominated for an Academy Award, as the costume category did not exist during the time of his major work for the studios.

== Legacy ==
Adrian is regarded as one of the most influential costume designers in Hollywood history. His historical costumes, feminine silhouettes, and modern tailoring helped define Hollywood's visual style and translated cinematic glamour into American fashion, beginning in the mid-1920s. By 1925, he had developed a reputation for anticipating fashion trends—a talent most famously demonstrated by the cultural impact of the "Letty Lynton dress" in 1932.

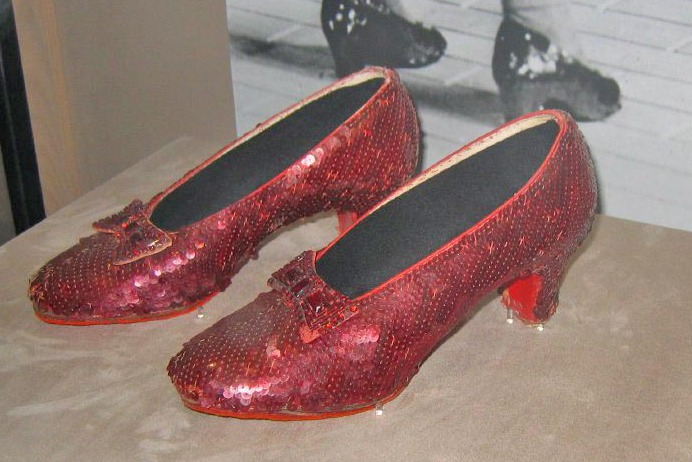
Adrian-designed ruby slippers for The Wizard of Oz (1939); now on display at the Smithsonian

=== Exhibitions ===
The red ruby slippers Adrian designed for the 1939 film The Wizard of Oz are preserved as a premier artifact in the Smithsonian National Museum of American History in Washington, D.C.

In 2002, the Metropolitan Museum of Art in New York City mounted an exhibition exploring Adrian's impact on American fashion at a time when French couture dominated the industry. Titled Adrian: American Glamour, the Fashion Institute presentation displayed more than 100 designs from both his film work and his fashion collections.

== Selected filmography ==
- A Sainted Devil (1924)
- Cobra (1925)
- Her Sister from Paris (1925)
- The Eagle (1925)
- The Volga Boatman (1926)
- The Son of the Sheik (1926)
- Fig Leaves (1926)
- For Alimony Only (1926)
- Young April (1926)
- Gigolo (1926)
- The Little Adventuress (1927)
- Vanity (1927)
- The Country Doctor (1927)
- The Fighting Eagle (1927)
- The Angel of Broadway (1927)
- The Wise Wife (1927)
- Dress Parade (1927)
- The Forbidden Woman (1927)
- The Wreck of the Hesperus (1927)
- The Main Event (1927)
- My Friend from India (1927)
- Chicago (1927)
- Almost Human (1927)
- A Ship Comes In (1928)
- Let 'Er Go, Gallegher (1928)
- What Price Beauty? (1928)
- Stand and Deliver (1928)
- The Blue Danube (1928)
- Midnight Madness (1928)
- Skyscraper (1928)
- Walking Back (1928)
- The Masks of the Devil (1928)
- Dream of Love (1928)
- A Lady of Chance (1928)
- A Woman of Affairs (1928)
- A Single Man (1929)
- Wild Orchids (1929)
- The Bridge of San Luis Rey (1929)
- The Godless Girl (1929)
- The Trial of Mary Dugan (1929)
- The Last of Mrs. Cheyney (1929)
- The Single Standard (1929)
- Our Modern Maidens (1929)
- The Unholy Night (1929)
- The Thirteenth Chair (1929)
- The Kiss (1929)
- Untamed (1929)
- Dynamite (1929)
- Their Own Desire (1929)
- Devil-May-Care (1929)
- Marianne (1929)
- Not So Dumb (1930)
- Anna Christie (1930)
- A Lady to Love (1930)
- A Lady's Morals (1930)
- Montana Moon (1930)
- This Mad World (1930)
- The Divorcee (1930)
- Redemption (1930)
- The Rogue Song (1930)
- In Gay Madrid (1930)
- The Lady of Scandal (1930)
- The Florodora Girl (1930)
- Our Blushing Brides (1930)
- Let Us Be Gay (1930)
- Romance (1930)
- Private Lives (1931)
- Possessed (1931)
- A Free Soul (1931)
- Laughing Sinners (1931)
- Mata Hari (1931)
- Grand Hotel (1932)
- Red Dust (1932)
- Letty Lynton (1932)
- Smilin' Through (1932)
- Huddle (1932)
- Strange Interlude (1932)
- Today We Live (1933)
- Beauty for Sale (1933)
- Stage Mother (1933)
- Dinner at Eight (1933)
- Queen Christina (1933)
- The Cat and the Fiddle (1934)
- Forsaking All Others (1934)
- The Barretts of Wimpole Street (1934)
- The Merry Widow (1934)
- Nana (1934)
- Naughty Marietta (1935)
- Anna Karenina (1935)
- I Live My Life (1935)
- Rose Marie (1936)
- Wife vs. Secretary (1936)
- Love on the Run (1936)
- The Great Ziegfeld (1936)
- Romeo and Juliet (1936)
- San Francisco (1936)
- The Gorgeous Hussy (1936)
- Born to Dance (1936)
- Camille (1937)
- Double Wedding (1937)
- The Last of Mrs. Cheyney (1937)
- Maytime (1937)
- Conquest (1937)
- The Firefly (1937)
- The Girl of the Golden West (1938)
- The Shopworn Angel (1938)
- Sweethearts (1938)
- Marie Antoinette (1938)
- The Wizard of Oz (1939)
- Balalaika (1939)
- The Women (1939)
- Strange Cargo (1940)
- New Moon (1940)
- Susan and God (1940)
- The Philadelphia Story (1940)
- Pride and Prejudice (1940)
- Boom Town (1940)
- When Ladies Meet (1941)
- Two-Faced Woman (1941)
- Ziegfeld Girl (1941)
- Woman of the Year (1942)
- Flight for Freedom (1943)
- Shadow of a Doubt (1943)
- Slightly Dangerous (1943)
- Humoresque (1946)
- Possessed (1947)
- Rope (1948)
- Lovely to Look At (1952)

== Bibliography ==
- Adrian: A Lifetime of Movie Glamour, Art and High Fashion, by Author Leonard Stanley, Foreword by Robin Adrian, Text by Mark A. Vieira
- Chierichetti, David (1976). Hollywood Costume Design. New York: Harmony Books. ISBN 9780517526378.
- Gutner, Howard (2001). Gowns by Adrian: The MGM Years, 1928–1941. New York: Harry N. Abrams Publishers. ISBN 9780810908987.
- Jorgensen, Jay; Scoggins, Donald L. (2015). Creating the Illusion: A Fashionable History of Hollywood Costume Designers. Philadelphia: Running Press. ISBN 9780762456611.
- Rhodes, Richard (2011). Hedy's Folly: The Life and Breakthrough Inventions of Hedy Lamarr, the Most Beautiful Woman in the World. New York: Vintage Books. ISBN 9780307742957.
- Scarfone, Jay; Stillman, William (2004). The Wizardry of Oz: The Artistry and Magic of the 1939 M-G-M Classic. New York: Applause Books. ISBN 9781557836243.
