= Margaret Ayer Barnes =

American dramatist

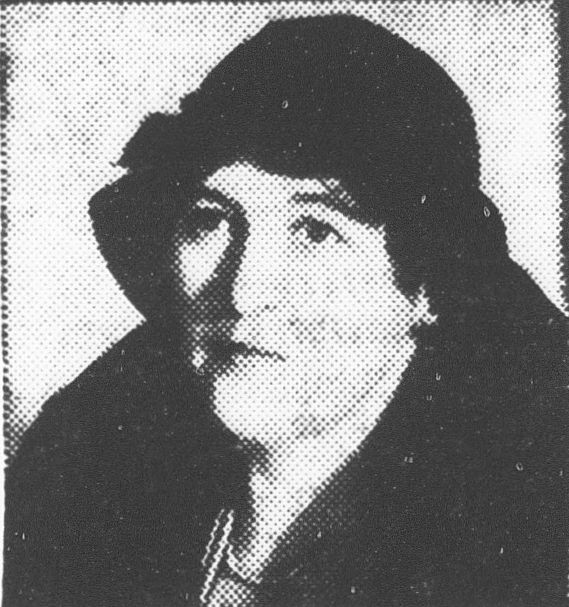
- Barnes c. 1936
- Born: Margaret Ayer; April 8, 1886; Chicago, Illinois, U.S.
- Died: October 25, 1967 (aged 81); Cambridge, Massachusetts, U.S.
- Education: Bryn Mawr College (BA)
- Occupation: Writer
- Spouse: Cecil Barnes (m. 1910)
- Children: 3, including Edward

Margaret Ayer Barnes (April 8, 1886, Chicago, Illinois – October 25, 1967, Cambridge, Massachusetts) was an American playwright, novelist, and short-story writer. Her 1930 novel Years of Grace was awarded the Pulitzer Prize.

== Biography ==
Barnes on her graduation day in 1907

Margaret Ayer grew up the youngest of four siblings in Chicago, Illinois. As a child, she had a keen interest in theater and reading. She befriended Edward Sheldon, a playwright who would encourage her to become a writer many years later.

Ayer attended Bryn Mawr College, where she earned an A.B. degree in 1907. In 1936, she received an honorary degree in Doctor of Letters from Oglethorpe University. She married Cecil Barnes in 1910, and had three sons.

In 1920, Barnes was elected alumnae director of Bryn Mawr and served three years. As director, she helped to organize the Bryn Mawr Summer School for Women Workers in Industry, which offered an alternative educational program for women workers within a traditional institution. Consisting mainly of young, single immigrant women with little to no academic background, the summer program offered courses in progressive education, liberal arts and economics. Women in the program were encouraged to develop confidence as speakers, writers and leaders in the workplace.

In 1926, at age 40, Barnes broke her back in a traffic accident. With the encouragement of friend and playwright Edward Sheldon, she took up writing as a way to occupy her time. Between 1926 and 1930 she wrote several short stories — all of them published by magazines and later collected in a volume titled Prevailing Winds — and three plays.

Her first play, an adaptation of Edith Wharton's 1920 novel The Age of Innocence, was purchased by Katharine Cornell in 1928. Gilbert Miller produced it on Broadway with Cornell's husband Guthrie McClintic directing; the play ran for 207 performances. Cornell next starred in a Broadway production of Dishonored Lady (1930), a play that Barnes wrote with Sheldon based on the famous case of Madeleine Smith. It was a popular melodrama that ran 16 weeks on Broadway followed by a long tour.

Barnes' 1929 play Jenny was also written in collaboration with Sheldon. The comedy was produced on Broadway starring Jane Cowl.

In 1931 Barnes won the Pulitzer Prize for her first novel, Years of Grace.

A 1936 lawsuit against Metro-Goldwyn-Mayer for copyright infringement claimed that the script MGM used for the motion picture Letty Lynton (1932) plagiarized material from the play Dishonored Lady by Edward Sheldon and Barnes. The film is still unavailable today because of this lawsuit.

== Personal life ==
Barnes was the wife of a prominent Chicago attorney, Cecil Barnes, with whom she had three sons including noted architect Edward Larrabee Barnes. Her older sister was suffragette and fellow author Janet Ayer Fairbank; her niece Janet Fairbank was a well-known operatic singer. Barnes died October 25, 1967, at her home in Cambridge, Massachusetts, aged 81.

== Works ==
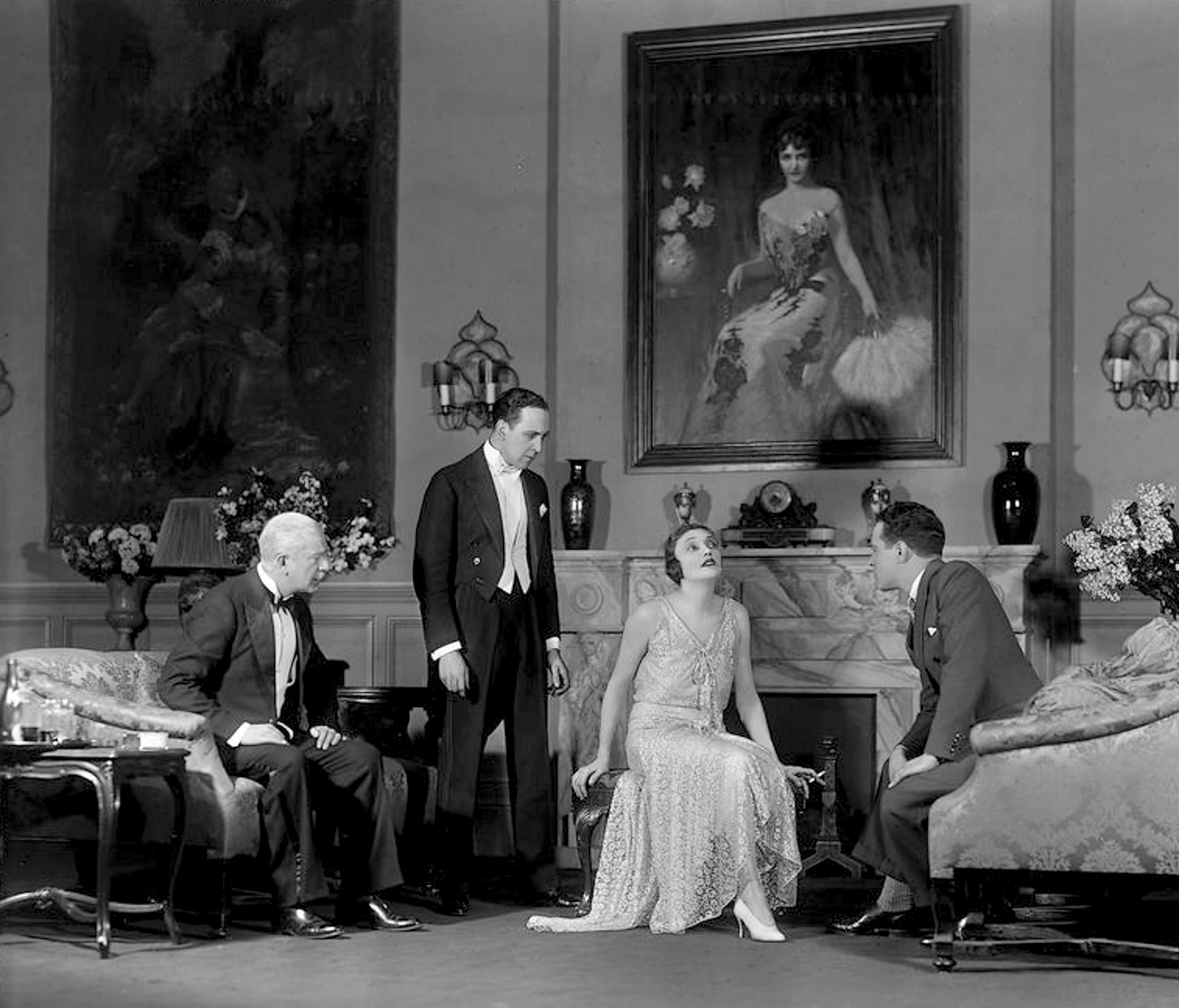
Katharine Cornell in the 1930 Broadway production of Dishonored Lady

- The Age of Innocence (1928), a dramatization of Edith Wharton's novel, adapted for a 1934 motion picture of the same name
- Jenny (1929), a play written with Edward Sheldon
- Dishonored Lady (1930), a play written with Edward Sheldon, adapted for a 1947 motion picture of the same name
- Prevailing Winds (1928), short stories
- Years of Grace (1930), a novel for which she was awarded the Pulitzer Prize
- Westward Passage (1931), a novel adapted for a 1932 motion picture of the same name
- Within This Present (1933), a novel
- Edna, His Wife (1935), a novel, adapted into a play of the same name written by Cornelia Otis Skinner
- Wisdom's Gate (1938), a novel
