= Robert Kalloch =

American costume designer (1893–1947)

Robert M. Kalloch
- Born: January 13, 1893; New York City, U.S.
- Died: October 19, 1947 (aged 54); Los Angeles, California, U.S.
- Years active: 1933 to 1948
- Known for: Costume design

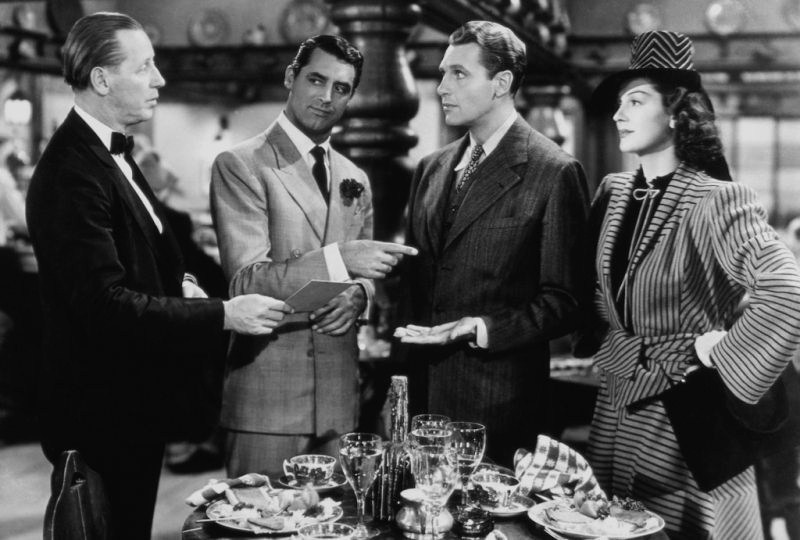
L. to R. : Irving Bacon, Cary Grant, Ralph Bellamy & Rosalind Russell in His Girl Friday; Russell is wearing a costume designed by Kalloch.

Robert Mero Kalloch III (January 13, 1893 — October 19, 1947), often known by his professional mononym Kalloch, was an American fashion designer and, later, a costume designer for Columbia Pictures and Metro-Goldwyn-Mayer. He worked on 105 films during his career, and was widely considered one of America's top fashion designers in the late 1930s.

== Early life and education ==
Robert Mero Kalloch III was born January 13, 1893, in New York City to Dr. Robert Mero Kalloch II and his wife, Emily (née Maguire). His father was a dentist of Scottish American descent. He attended New York City public schools, then spent four years at the Dwight School on Manhattan's Upper West Side. During his last three years at Dwight, he also attended and graduated from the New York School of Fine and Applied Arts. He later taught at the School of Fine and Applied Arts in his mid-20s, helping to educate Travis Banton and Adrian (both later Hollywood costume designers), (Note: Kalloch met Adrian during the 1920-1921 school year. Deciding to leave Parsons' New York City school for its Paris branch, Adrian had nothing to do for the summer. Kalloch recommended Adrian for his first professional job, designing costumes for the Gloucester Playhouse in Gloucester, Massachusetts.) and was a member of the jury in the school's 1918 costume design show. Although he won admission to Yale University, he never attended.

== Early career ==
Upon graduation from the Dwight School, Kalloch joined Vogue as an illustrator and designer of women's fashions. At the age of 18, Kalloch sought out one of his idols, the prima ballerina Anna Pavlova. After weeks of haunting the performers' entrance at the theater where she was appearing, he finally convinced her to look at his sketches. She was so impressed that she hired him to design costumes for one of her ballets. He later designed costumes for the opera singer Mary Garden.

In 1919, Kalloch won a position with Lucile Ltd., the fashion house of Lucy, Lady Duff-Gordon. He worked in the London and Paris branches of the company, studying fashion and designing costumes for the Grande Revue of the Casino de Paris. Dancer Irene Castle was one of Lucile's clients, and Kalloch designed a number of her dance dresses. Castle swiftly became "the epitome of chic" to the public, and Kalloch was known as the "man who made the clothes that made Irene Castle famous".

Returning to the United States in 1920, Kalloch took a job with Madame Frances & Co., where he co-designed fashions with Travis Banton. According to Edith Head, Kalloch and Banton's designs resembled one another, but Kalloch's work was more imaginative. By 1921, Kalloch was well known in New York City for designing costumes for the Ziegfeld Follies. He also designed costumes for Grace Moore's 1923 Broadway debut in Music Box Revue. In the five years he worked with Madame France & Co., Kalloch visited Europe 28 times to study fashion.

Throughout the early and mid 1920s, he freelanced for Peggy Hamilton, a fashion designer who had worked as chief costume designer for Triangle Film Corporation.

It is unclear what Kalloch's work history included between 1926 and 1930, although for at least a year he worked for fashion entrepreneur Hattie Carnegie. He came to the attention of Hollywood in the late 1920s when Peggy Hamilton, by then a Los Angeles Times fashion columnist began promoting his work in her articles.

== Hollywood ==
=== Early work: 1933 to 1935 ===
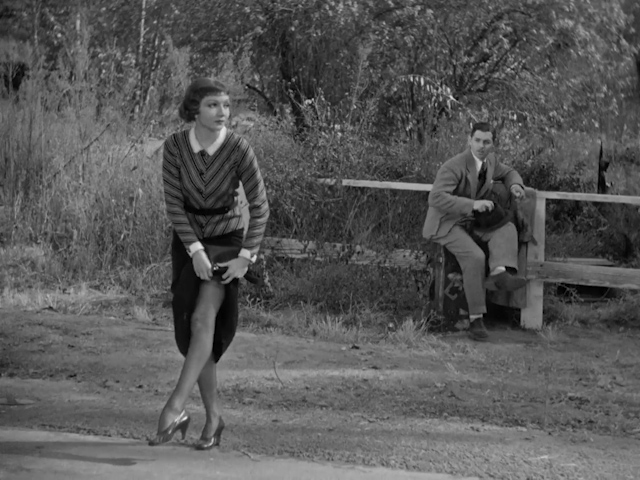
Claudette Colbert wearing a Kalloch-designed costume in It Happened One Night

In 1933, Columbia Pictures hired Kalloch to be their chief fashion and women's costume designer. He was the first contract costume designer ever hired by the studio, and he established the studio's wardrobe department. Until his death, he was often credited by the mononym "Kalloch". Columbia Pictures at the time had a reputation as a Poverty Row B movie studio. Founder and president Harry Cohn was determined to change that, and in addition to hiring popular actresses like Nancy Carroll, Irene Dunne, Lillian Harvey, Grace Moore, and Fay Wray he hired top-flight technical talent like Kalloch. Kalloch's employment, in turn, convinced these leading actresses that Columbia Pictures intended to invest in their careers.

Among his first works was a lace gown for Mary Brian in the 1933 film Fog and a gown with enormous draped sleeves for Glenda Farrell in Lady for a Day. He also designed the costumes for Elissa Landi for Excursion to Paradise (released under the title Sisters Under the Skin) and (with Edward Stevenson) for Barbara Stanwyck in The Bitter Tea of General Yen. He went to Paris in June 1934 to see the latest fashion trends, and by September of that year had designed costumes for Claudette Colbert (for It Happened One Night), Carole Lombard, Grace Moore, and Genevieve Tobin. After his return, he designed notable costumes for Ann Sothern in Eight Bells and a set of clothes for Joan Bennett in She Couldn't Take It which altered the actress' look from conservative to chic.

Kalloch was Columbia Pictures' first good costume and fashion designer, Between 1930 and 1934, Columbia Pictures transformed itself from a Poverty Row studio to one of the eight major film studios during Hollywood's Golden Age. With Columbia's releases more than doubling from 21 to 47 a year, Kalloch was overwhelmed with work. In May 1935, Columbia Pictures hired Murray Mayer to lead its ladies' wardrobe department. Kalloch retained his position as the studio's fashion and costume designer. During this early period, Kalloch's work favored classic, graceful lines that treated actresses like sculpted marble. His work emphasized their height and slimness.

Kalloch's mother died on June 29, 1935. Her death prompted Kalloch to leave Columbia and return to New York City, where he took a job once again with Madame Frances & Co. When Madame Frances retired in 1936, Kalloch returned to Columbia.

=== Maturing work: 1936 to 1939 ===
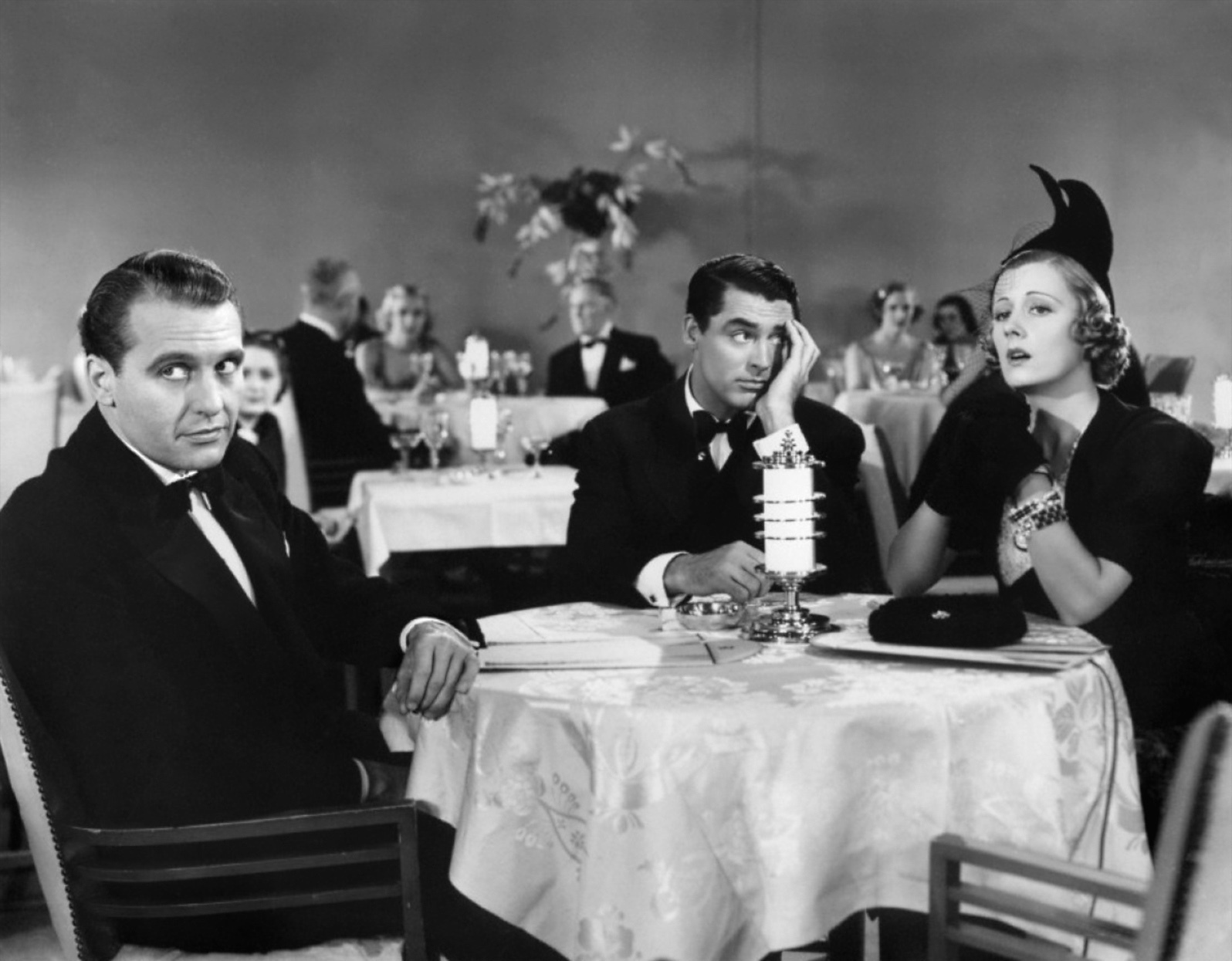
Irene Dunne in a Kalloch-designed evening dress and hat in The Awful Truth

Over the next two years, Kalloch designed on-screen fashions for Ida Lupino in Weather or No (released as Let's Get Married), Irene Dunne in The Awful Truth, Madeleine Carroll in It's All Yours, and Mary Astor in No Time to Marry. Among his most innovative works during this time was a set of Persian cut cocktail pajamas for Grace Moore in I'll Take Romance. It started a brief fashion trend.

During this period, Kalloch began to integrate low-cut décolletage and short bolero jackets into much of his work. He also became fascinated by the new colors the fabric, leather, and textile companies were creating and began using them in his designs.

=== Late Columbia years: 1939 to 1941 ===
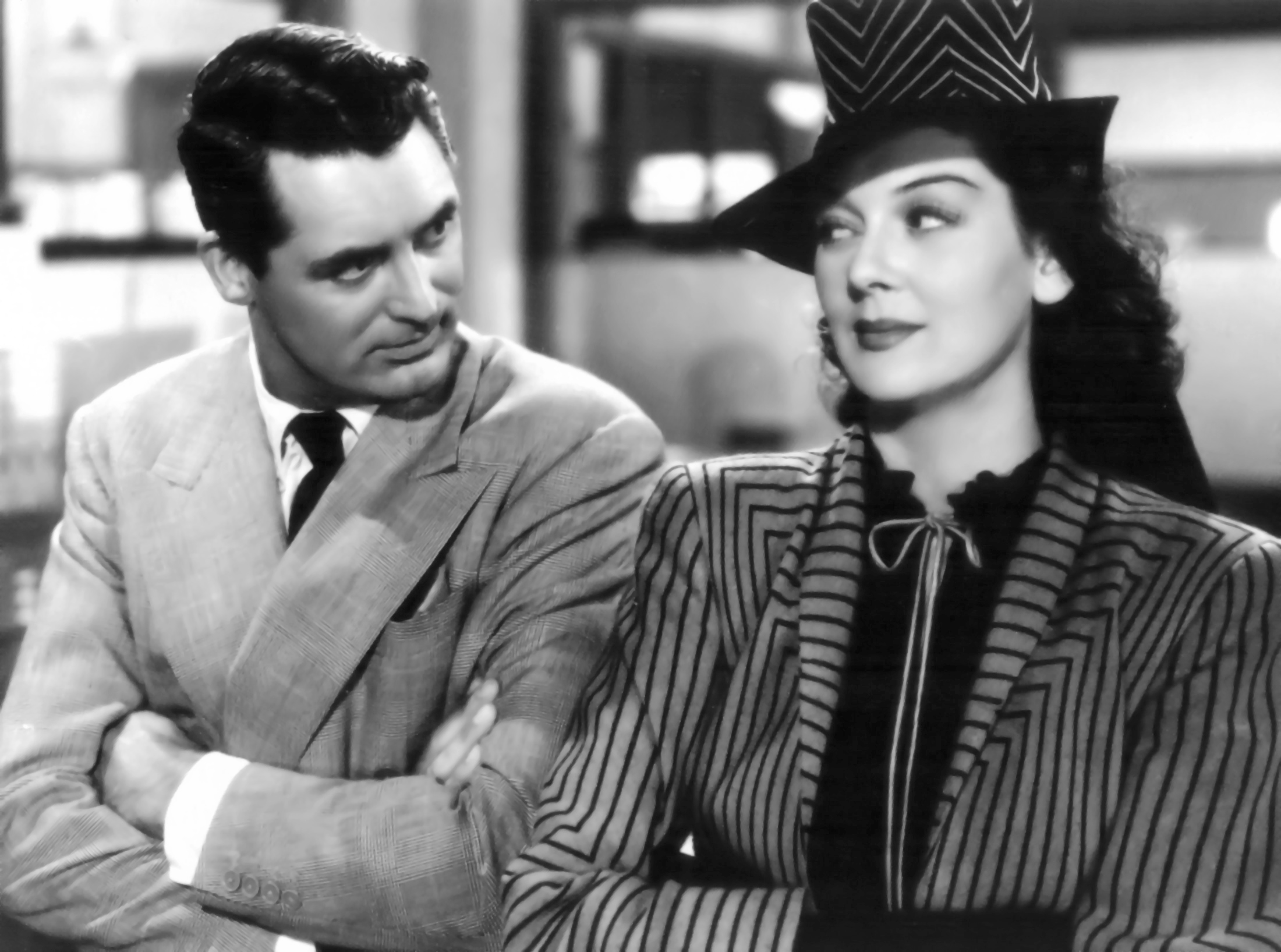
Rosalind Russell in a Kalloch-designed dress and hat in His Girl Friday

From 1939 to 1941, Kalloch designed notable on-screen fashions for Jean Arthur in Mr. Smith Goes to Washington and Only Angels Have Wings; Rosalind Russell in His Girl Friday; Rita Hayworth in The Lone Wolf Spy Hunt, Who Killed Gail Preston?, Only Angels Have Wings, Music in My Heart, and Angels Over Broadway; Loretta Young in The Doctor Takes a Wife; Penny Singleton in Blondie, Blondie Takes a Vacation, Blondie on a Budget, Blondie Has Servant Trouble, and Blondie Plays Cupid; Katharine Hepburn in Holiday; Joan Blondell in There's Always a Woman and Good Girls Go to Paris; and Barbara O'Neil and Wendy Barrie in I Am the Law.

During this period, Kalloch continued to favor long, slim lines and form-fitting silhouettes. He preferred slim waists accented with a wide belt, and long skirts with long sleeves and a high collar. Only in 1939 for Good Girls Go to Paris did he shorten skirts to just below the knee.

Among his most outstanding works between 1939 and 1941 was for Katharine Hepburn in 1938's Holiday. Kalloch began experimenting for the first time with odd jackets, using them to create new looks for classic outfits. He also designed a yellow chenille robe for her which was widely acclaimed. The media also paid particular attention to his work for Joan Blondell in 1938's There's Always a Woman, where Kalloch had to design a chic-looking wardrobe out of cheap garments and cloth. Another of his important works in this period was a red wool suit designed for Loretta Young in 1940's He Stayed for Breakfast.

Kalloch traveled to Europe to view fashions again in late 1939, returning to the United States in March 1940.

=== MGM years: 1941 to 1943 ===
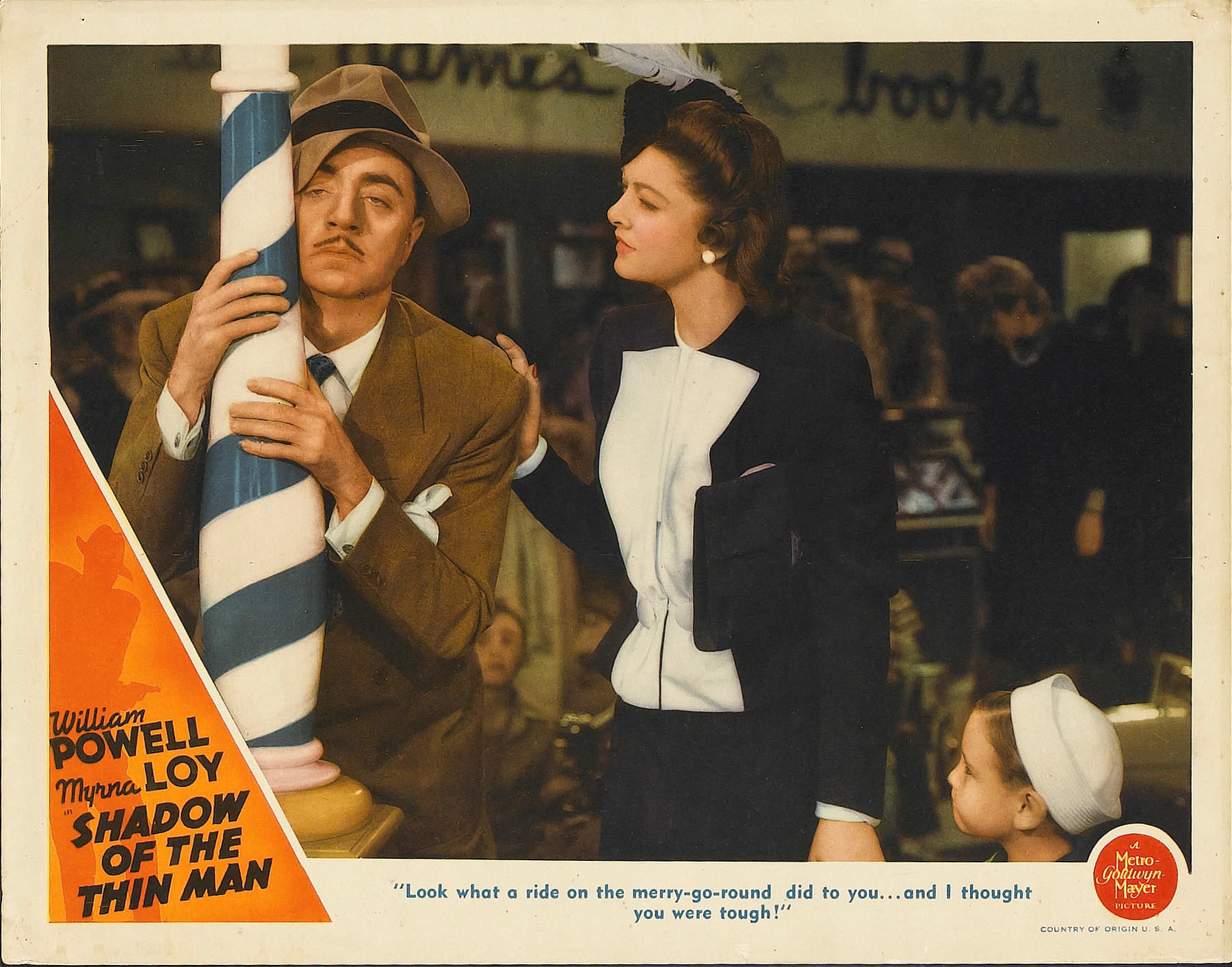
Myrna Loy in a Kalloch-designed dress and hat from Shadow of the Thin Man

Kalloch left Columbia Pictures in early 1941, and by May was working for Metro-Goldwyn-Mayer (MGM). The reason for his employment seems to be that his designs strongly resembled those of Adrian, MGM's chief fashion designer, with whom Kalloch had maintained a close friendship since Adrian's student days at the New York School of Fine and Applied Arts. Adrian then left the studio on September 5, 1941, to open his own fashion firm. (Note: Although sources such as Jorgensen and Scoggins say that Kalloch was hired to replace Adrian, Howard Gutner (Adrian's biographer) says that Adrian's departure from the studio came as a shock to Louis B. Mayer. Gutner and costume design historian David Chierichetti note that Adrian had contemplated leaving MGM for a year or two, upset with budgetary retrenchments caused by the Great Depression and changes in public tastes due to the prospect of the war in Europe involving the United States. Adrian had a serious disagreement with director George Cukor, producer Bernard Hyman, and MGM head Louis B. Mayer over the style of costumes Greta Garbo should wear in the upcoming Two-Faced Woman, which began preproduction about April 1941. Adrian apparently resolved to leave the studio after this disagreement. He notified MGM of his decision on July 16, 1941. His last day was to have been August 15, but he offered to stay on to wrap up various projects. Mayer kept him on the payroll until September 5. Adrian was not terminated by MGM, nor did he resign; his three-year contract merely expired.) During his short tenure at MGM, Kalloch designed costumes for Hedy Lamarr in H. M. Pulham, Esq., White Cargo, and Crossroads; Myrna Loy in Shadow of the Thin Man; Judy Garland in Babes on Broadway; Ann Sothern in Ringside Maisie and Maisie Gets Her Man; Eleanor Powell in I'll Take Manila (released under the title Ship Ahoy); Norma Shearer in We Were Dancing and Love Me Not (released under the title Her Cardboard Lover); Lana Turner in Somewhere I'll Find You; Veronica Lake in This Gun For Hire; Rosalind Russell in Design for Scandal; 18 sparkling white gowns for Jeanette MacDonald in her first non-period piece film, Shadow of a Lady (released under the title Cairo); and Greer Garson in Random Harvest and Mrs. Miniver; In an unusual endeavor, Kalloch also designed the drag costume for Mickey Rooney in 1941's Babes on Broadway.

Among Kalloch's more important work in this period were the costumes he designed for Eleanor Powell in 1942's Ship Ahoy. Among these were 16 sheer dresses draped over crêpe tinted to look like a nude body. Another was a gown made of black marquisette, (Note: Marquisette is a lightweight, open mesh fabric in a leno weave. It sometimes shows small geometric patterns and extra texture.) and which featured a high, round neckline; long, skintight gloves; and a pleated skirt over a slip dyed pale cocoa. He also designed a unique sarong of spun glass for her to wear in the film. Powell said she collaborated with Kalloch on her costumes in the film to ensure that the gowns both accommodated her dancing and moved and flowed well. For Norma Shearer in Her Cardboard Lover, Kalloch designed costumes which were the first indications of a new flowing, moving style in his work. One of the most innovative gowns he designed for Shearer in this film became known as the "umbrella dress". Made of pink chiffon, it was embroidered with pearls, leaves, tendrils, with the yoke heavily encrusted with these items. Its "umbrella" shape was due to its circular shape, with a central hole for the neck and no sleeves. Kalloch also began to design shorter dresses. Although he actually lengthened Shearer's skirts in Her Cardboard Lover by several inches, he cut 5 inches (130 mm) off Jeanette MacDonald's skirts in Cairo.

The entry of the United States into World War II on December 7, 1941, led to heavy restrictions on the amount and kinds of fabric and other materials available to motion picture studios for use in costume design. Studios were also under pressure from the federal government to make films which exhibited confidence, energy, improvisation, movement, and spontaneity (all emotions which the government wanted the public to feel about the war effort). Kalloch began altering his design look and feel in early 1942 to reflect these needs. He largely abandoned elaborate, studied designs in favor of the chemise dress. (Note: The chemise dress was widely adopted in the United States during World War I due to wartime restrictions on fabric. Similar to the chemise worn prior to the early 1800s, it was a straight cut (not fitted), sleeveless dress which was pulled over the head. It was almost always worn with a half-slip. It could be accessorized with a bodice to lift and shape the breasts, and a tunic to cover or accentuate the shoulders.) (Note: Edith Head advocated a return to conservative lines and draping, but Kalloch felt this did not go far enough to achieve the needed economies.) Belts, pleats, and unique fastenings were no longer used. Skirts were fuller, (Note: When a longer skirt was needed, it was narrower and not as full.) but generally above the knees. Shoulders were broader and clothes could ripple, but swirling movement was no longer possible due to restrictions on the amount of fabric used. Crocheted hats and knitted scarves were now common (which indicated to the audience that these items were home-made rather than store-bought), and cords were used for draping but not as belts.

Kalloch often was forced to improvise due to restrictions on materials. Because silk prints were not available, Kalloch produced appliqués in large batches and had them applied to plain silk. These proved so popular that Greer Garson, Hedy Lamarr, and Jeanette MacDonald all bought appliqué garments for their private wardrobes. He created what he called "body bandanas" for Lamarr's wardrobe in White Cargo—three sarongs which could be redraped or reversed in order to provide variety. A renewed focus on line helped reduced the need for trim, and he discovered that piping could substitute for a belt. Using these and other innovations, he saved 20 yards (18 m) of fabric, 50 yards (46 m) trim, several pounds of sequins, beads and spangles, and multiple yards of thread on Jeanette MacDonald's wardrobe in Cairo.

=== After MGM ===
Kalloch had been named Adrian's successor at MGM, but by late 1941 it was clear his design work and productivity were not acceptable to the studio. The reasons are unclear, but MGM head Louis B. Mayer may have been unhappy with his designs since Kalloch had no experience with period costumes. Columbia Pictures' Harry Cohn disliked this genre of film, and Kalloch had done no work in the genre prior to joining MGM. Kalloch may also have been suffering from personal problems, as his life-partner Joseph Demarais began to rapidly decline due to severe alcoholism.

In June 1942, at the suggestion of Mayer's wife, Margaret, MGM hired Irene (Irene Lentz) as the studio's chief costume designer. Kalloch was retained as MGM's fashion designer. Kalloch's authority was further eroded when the studio hired Howard Shoup as a fashion designer in late July.

Kalloch left MGM in 1943, although he continued to do freelance work for the studios until his death. His last major films were the 1946 film Suspense and the 1948 picture Mr. Blandings Builds His Dream House (in which he dressed Myrna Loy again). He created wardrobes and women's fashions for 105 motion pictures.

Kalloch was never nominated for the Academy Award for Best Costume Design, as the category was only introduced in 1948.

== Other fashion work ==
Peggy Hamilton often featured his work in her Los Angeles fashion shows in the 1930s, and Kalloch exhibited his film and private fashions at various shows. Film magazines regularly featured his work.

Kalloch's fame as a costume and fashion designer was so great by 1937 that the press began to interview him with some frequency about fashion trends. He criticized "fussy" fashion, favored the swing skirt, supported the use of sheer fabrics for summer wear, offered advice to brides on a budget, and advocated slim lines and the use of suede.

Beginning in 1938 and lasting two years, Kalloch wrote occasional fashion columns for the Los Angeles Times. By 1940, Kalloch was considered one of the nation's top fashion designers and he was a member of the Los Angeles Fashion Group, a nonprofit organization of (largely female) fashion designers.

Throughout his Hollywood career, Kalloch continued to design fashions for the private use of a number of famous women, including Fay Wray, Grace Moore, Mona von Bismarck (wife of industrialist Harrison Williams), Joan Perry, Doris Nolan, Gloria Stuart, Ida Lupino, Loretta Young, and Rosalind Russell. He even designed a "strip tease dress" for Eleanor Powell for her 1942 USO tour. Her black evening dress was composed of several pieces, each of which was removed during the routine to reveal only a brief dance costume at the end.

He also designed a 1937 line of hats for mass production, costumes for Nancy Carroll when she appeared in the play Jealousy in 1935, and (with Walter J. Israel) costumes for the San Francisco Light Opera Company's 1946 production of Jerome Kern's Roberta.

== Personal life ==
Kalloch had an unusually close relationship with his mother. She lived with her son in his New York City apartment after Kalloch's father died in 1915, and accompanied him to Europe in 1919 and 1920. He and his mother moved into an apartment at 1335 N. Laurel Avenue in Los Angeles in either late 1931 or January 1932. Kalloch and his mother collected antiques all over the world, and filled the apartment with them. Kalloch had found a black stray cat in Central Park in New York and named it Mimosa. In Los Angeles, Kalloch devoted an entire room of his apartment to the cat, covering the walls with chicken wire and growing ivy over it. Cushions were strewn on the floor for the cat's comfort.

Kalloch was homosexual, and since at least 1931 was partnered with Joseph Demarais. Demarais' parents were French Canadian immigrants to the United States, and he grew up very poor in Tiverton, Rhode Island, the youngest of five children. In his teens, he worked in the local textile factory before relocating to New York City to become an artist. By the late 1920s, Demarais was sharing an apartment with other struggling artists. It is unclear when Kalloch and Demarais met, although there is evidence to suggest that they both worked for Madame Frances & Co. Demarais relocated to Los Angeles in February 1932 to be with Kalloch.

In 1939, Kalloch and Demarais jointly purchased a home at 4329 Agnes Avenue in the Studio City neighborhood of Los Angeles for $10,000 ($200,000 in 2025 dollars). The two decorated the house with antiques and paintings. After his move to MGM, Kalloch put Demarais on the studio's payroll as his own secretary at a salary of $950 ($20,795 in 2025 dollars) a year. Demarais, an alcoholic, entered a residential sanatorium for alcoholics for the first time in 1941. His stay was brief, but he returned to the facility numerous times over the next five years. During this period, Kalloch's professional output declined dramatically.

Kalloch wore round wire-frame glasses and was never without his silver cigarette case. He was a good cook, often experimenting in the kitchen. He reportedly suffered from a number of phobias and neuroses, the most famous of which was his fear of automobiles. He refused to own a car of his own, and when forced to ride in a car would cower on the floor of the back seat.

== Death ==
Kalloch had arteriosclerosis, and died of cardiac arrest at about 6:00 am at his home on October 19, 1947. His lover, Joseph Demarais, died of alcoholic fatty liver disease at 3:15 pm the same day. With Demarais' death coming so soon after Kalloch's, a suspicion of foul play arose. Autopsies on both men confirmed a natural cause of death in both instances. He was interred at Grand View Memorial Park Cemetery in Glendale, California. Travis Banton paid for half of Kalloch's burial and funeral expenses.

Kalloch's will designated Demarais as his heir. Demarais' will, in turn, designated Kalloch as his heir. Demarais inherited Kalloch's $5,000 ($100,000 in 2025 dollars) estate. But because Demarais' will was inoperative, his estate (valued at $20,000 [$300,000 in 2025 dollars]) and Kalloch's went to Demarai's two brothers. Kalloch's uncle and aunt sued to overturn Kalloch's will. The court battle, which was ultimately resolved in favor of the Demarais heirs, lasted four years. Kalloch's relations settled the lawsuit for $750 ($9,093 in 2025 dollars), while Demarais' siblings received the remaining $10,000 ($100,000 in 2025 dollars).

== Bibliography ==
- Chierichetti, David (1976). Hollywood Costume Design. New York: Harmony Books. ISBN 9780517526378.
- Cumming, Valerie; Cunnington, C.W.; Cunnington, P.E. (2017). Dictionary of Fashion History. New York: Bloomsbury Publishing. ISBN 9781472577702.
- Dick, Bernard F. (2010). Columbia Pictures: Portrait of a Studio. Lexington, Ky.: University Press of Kentucky. ISBN 9780813130194.
- Ellenberger, Allan R. (2001). Celebrities in Los Angeles Cemeteries: A Directory. Jefferson, N.C.: McFarland & Company. ISBN 9780786409839.
- Engelmeier, Regine; Engelmeier, Peter W.; Einzig, Barbara (1997). Fashion in Film. New York: Prestel. ISBN 9783791318080.
- Finamore, Michelle Tolini (2013). Hollywood Before Glamour: Fashion in American Silent Film. Basingstoke, UK: Palgrave Macmillan. ISBN 9780230389489.
- Gutner, Howard (2001). Gowns by Adrian: The MGM Years, 1928-1941. New York: Harry N. Abrams Publishers. ISBN 9780810908987.
- Hanson, Patricia King, ed. (1993). The American Film Institute Catalog of Motion Pictures Produced in the United States. Feature Films: 1931-1940. Berkeley, Calif.: University of California Press. ISBN 9780520079083.
- Hernandez, David (2010). Broken Face In The Mirror (Crooks and Fallen Stars That Look Very Much Like Us). Pittsburgh: Red Lead Press. ISBN 9781434964847.
- International Motion Picture Almanac. New York: Quigley Publishing Co. 1941.
- International Motion Picture Almanac. New York: Quigley Publishing Co. 1943.
- Jorgensen, Jay; Scoggins, Donald L. (2015). Creating the Illusion: A Fashionable History of Hollywood Costume Designers. Philadelphia: Running Press. ISBN 9780762456611.
- Lamparski, Richard (1969). Whatever Became Of...? Second Series. New York: Crown Publishers. OCLC 317822685.
- Leese, Elizabeth (1991). Costume Design in the Movies: An Illustrated Guide to the Work of 157 Great Designers. New York: Doveer Publications. ISBN 9780486265483.
- Lower, Cheryl Bray; Palmer, R. Barton, eds. (2001). Joseph L. Mankiewicz: Critical Essays With an Annotated Bibliography and a Filmography. Jefferson, N.C.: McFarland. ISBN 9780786409877.
- Mann, William J. (2001). Behind the Screen: How Gays and Lesbians Shaped Hollywood, 1910-1969. New York: Viking Press. ISBN 9780670030170.
- McLean, Adrienne L. (2017). Costume, Makeup, and Hair. London: I.B. Tauris. ISBN 9781784537562.
- Rhodes, Richard (2011). Hedy's Folly: The Life and Breakthrough Inventions of Hedy Lamarr, the Most Beautiful Woman in the World. New York: Vintage Books. ISBN 9780307742957.
- Scarfone, Jay; Stillman, William (2004). The Wizardry of Oz: The Artistry and Magic of the 1939 M-G-M Classic. New York: Applause Books. ISBN 9781557836243.
- Smyth, Jennifer E. (2018). Nobody's Girl Friday: The Women Who Ran Hollywood. New York: Oxford University Press. ISBN 9780190840822.
- Taves, Brian (2006). P.G. Wodehouse and Hollywood: Screenwriting, Satires, and Adaptations. Jefferson, N.C.: McFarland. ISBN 9780786422883.
- Tortora, Phyllis G.; Johnson, Ingrid (2014). The Fairchild Books Dictionary of Textiles. New York: Fairchild Books. ISBN 9781609015350.
