= Andreani =

Andreani is an Italian surname, derived from Andrea (Andrew). Notable people with the surname include:

- Aldo Andreani (1887–1971), Italian architect and sculptor
- Andrea Andreani (1540–1623), Italian engraver
- André-ani (1901–1953), American costume designer
- Clément Henri Andreani (1901–1953), American costume designer
- Éveline Plicque-Andréani, née Boudon (1929–2018), French composer, musicologist and pedagogue
- George Andreani (1901–1979), Polish film score composer of Argentine films
- Giulia Andreani (born 1985), Italian artist
- Henri Andréani (1877–1936), French film director of the silent era
- Isabelle Andréani (1923–2018), French mezzo-soprano
- Jacques Andreani (1929–2015), French diplomat
- Luca Andreani (born 2001), Italian rugby union player
- Marcelo Andreani (1910–1982), Italian-born Mexican professional wrestler
- Paolo Andreani (1763–1823), Italian who made the first balloon flight over Italian soil

== Other uses ==
- Palazzo Sormani-Andreani, seat of the central public library of Milan
