= Oboler =

Oboler is a surname. Notable people with the surname include:

- Arch Oboler (1909–1987), American playwright, screenwriter, novelist, producer, and director
- Eli M. Oboler (1915–1983), American librarian
- Suzanne Oboler, Peruvian-American scholar
