= Edward Stevenson (costume designer) =

American costume designer (1906–1968)

- Born: Edward Manson Stevenson; May 13, 1906; Pocatello, Idaho, United States
- Died: December 2, 1968 (aged 62); Los Angeles, California, United States
- Other name: Edward M. Stevenson
- Occupation: Costume Designer
- Years active: 1924-1968

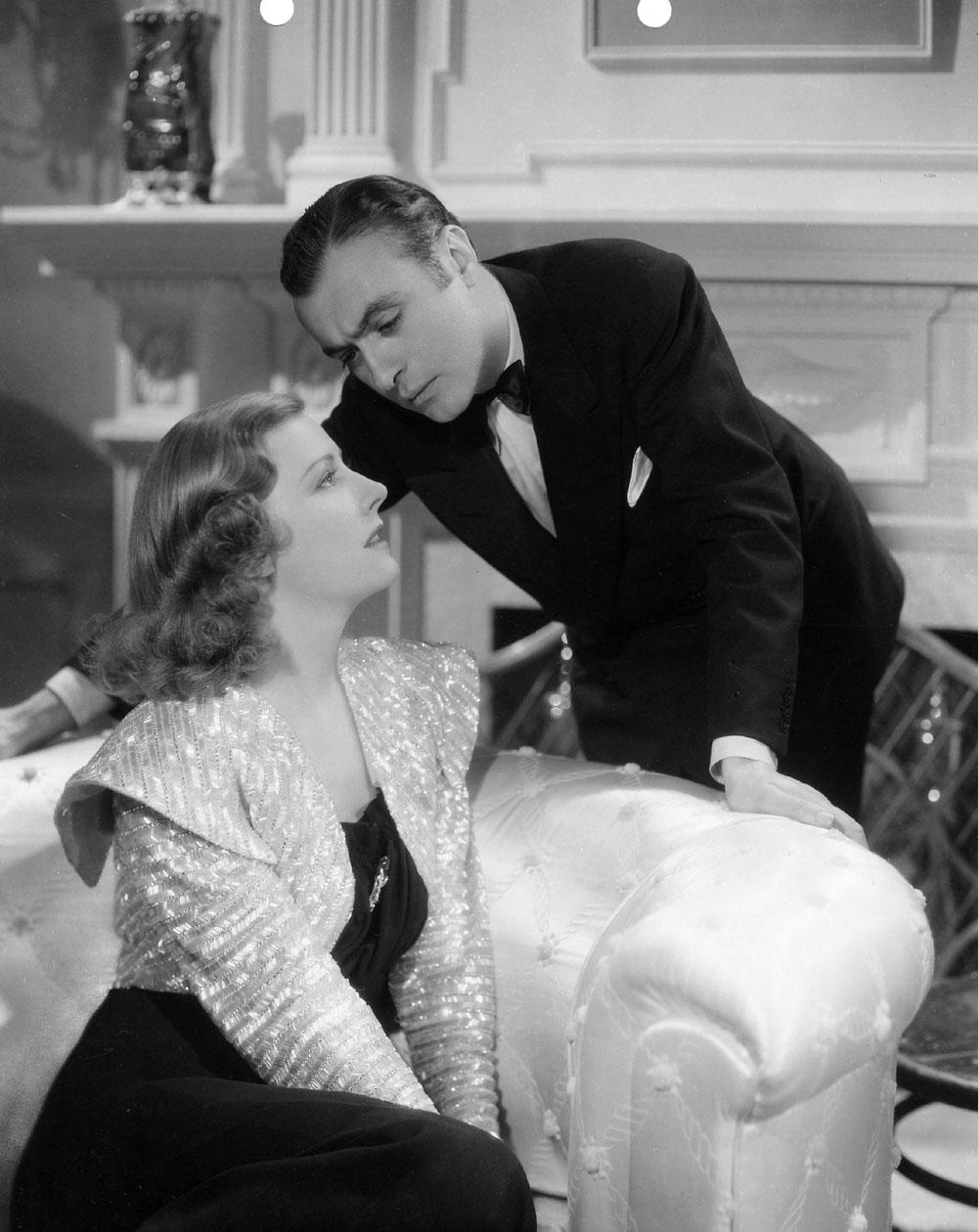
Charles Boyer and Irene Dunne in Love Affair.

Edward Manson Stevenson (May 13, 1906 – December 2, 1968) was an Academy Award-winning American costume designer. His film and television credits number well over two hundred, including Citizen Kane (1941) and It's a Wonderful Life (1946), both frequently cited as being among the greatest films of all time. In his later years, he worked for Lucille Ball as costume designer for I Love Lucy, The Lucy-Desi Comedy Hour, The Lucy Show, and Here’s Lucy. A large collection of his costume sketches are housed in the Department of Special collections at Eli M. Oboler Library in Pocatello, Idaho.

== Early life ==
Edward Manson Stevenson was born in Pocatello, Idaho on May 13, 1906, to Jennie Uhland Stevenson (née Dolly) and Andrew Burtner Stevenson. Andrew worked for the Oregon Shortline Railroad, a subsidiary of Union Pacific, rising from dispatch clerk to division superintendent. He served a term in 1903 as senator from Bannock County in the Idaho state legislature and was the Republican nominee in 1907 for Pocatello mayor. Andrew's political activity was often limited by time spent fulfilling his duties with the railroad, duties which included a great deal of travel. Jennie, a widowed former schoolteacher, had two sons from her first marriage to Frank Uhland Sr. who died in Denver in 1904. Andrew and Jennie married July 23, 1905 and Edward was born the following year.

Stevenson was educated at St. Joseph's Catholic school and also took correspondence courses in art. He suffered from significant respiratory difficulties, and sometime in 1915, Jennie took him to California in hopes that the change in climate would provide some relief. They stayed in California into the following year and then returned to Idaho.

In December 1919 when he was 13 years old, Stevenson's father died. By 1922, Stevenson and his mother had again taken up residence in California.

== Apprenticeship and early career ==
Sources disagree regarding Stevenson's entry into the Hollywood film community, though the various stories all relate one of two distinct paths, both involving connections with people in the film industry.

One version asserts that his mother, while traveling on a train between California and Idaho, met the friend of a Hollywood designer, possibly from the Robert Brunton studios. She impressed her new acquaintance so profoundly with some of Stevenson's artwork that she gained for her son a letter of introduction to the designer. Through this letter, Stevenson was able to get jobs as a sketch artist during school breaks, impressing those he worked with sufficiently that he was able to begin building his career.

The other story relates that Stevenson and his mother lived next door to Lova Klenowsky, a cousin of Gloria Swanson. Klenowsky became aware of Stevenson's artistic abilities and interest in design, and she introduced him to Clément Henri Andreani, known professionally as André-ani. The designer was impressed and tutored the young man in costume design for approximately two years.

=== Silent Film Work ===
In 1924, Stevenson began working as a sketch artist for Norma Talmadge’s production company, and he was also allowed to submit his own designs. One Stevenson design mentioned in numerous accounts is a silver gown worn by Barbara LaMarr in The White Moth (1924). When Andre-aní was hired to replace Erte at MGM in 1925, he brought in his young protégé to sketch for him. Andre-aní designed for Greta Garbo, Norma Shearer, Louise Fazenda, and Joan Crawford during that time.

In May 1925 and April 1926, Stevenson executed costumes for stage productions presented at Pocatello High School, allowing him to gain experience designing for an actual production in a low-profile location. The productions were Once in a Blue Moon and Bizet’s Carmen, respectively.

When Andre-ani and MGM parted ways, Stevenson found work as a sketch artist and occasional designer at Fox. In the 1927 film Seventh Heaven, Janet Gaynor wore a white lace wedding gown of Stevenson's design, the only known example of a Stevenson design from this period in his career.

=== Warner Brothers/First National ===
Stevenson's first contract as a designer was signed in 1928 with First National Pictures, Inc., then one of the largest theater chains and movie studios in the United States. Warner Brothers had recently gained controlling interest in First National and installed one of their production executives, Hal Wallis, as studio head. It was Wallis's wife, comic film actress Louise Fazenda whom Stevenson had met while at MGM, who convinced Wallis to give the aspiring designer a chance.

Warner Brothers purchased First National in November of the following year, bringing in their own designer, Earl Luick. There was plenty of work for both of them, including the film "Paris", but when Stevenson's contract was up, Orry-Kelly was hired in his stead. Stevenson's name was also excluded from the credits of many of the Warner/First National films on which he had worked, so after his departure he filed suit on the company.

=== Independence ===
From August 1931 through August 1932, Stevenson worked independently, costuming five films for Columbia Pictures, as well as Hotel Continental for Tiffany Pictures. Three of the five Columbia movies were Frank Capra films and included Platinum Blonde (1931) with Jean Harlow and Loretta Young. Stevenson was also brought in to Hal Roach Studios to design clothes for Thelma Todd, whom he had likely met while designing for Broadminded (1931) at Warner Bros./First National.

During this period, Stevenson established his own design salon, Blakely House, creating personal wardrobes for many of Hollywood's stars and social elite, as well as costumes for studios without their own designers.

== The RKO Years ==
=== A Second Beginning ===
1935 marked Stevenson's return to employment with a major Hollywood studio, though it meant he had to return to sketching the ideas of other designers. Walter Plunkett, who later went on to design the costumes for Gone With the Wind (1939), had been creating costumes and managing wardrobe at RKO and its predecessor, FBO Pictures, since the mid-1920s. During his ten years there, RKO had sometimes assigned screen credit to designer Max Ree for work Plunkett had done. They had also brought Bernard Newman over from Bergdorf Goodman department store in New York to dress Ginger Rogers, one of their biggest stars. Plunkett and Newman did not get along. After failing to obtain a contract from RKO that guaranteed him screen credit for the films on which he worked, Plunkett decided to go elsewhere.

When Plunkett departed, Newman was required to deal with the more mundane costuming chores in addition to his exclusive designing assignments and he hired Stevenson to sketch out his ideas. However, Newman soon proved unable to work as quickly as was needed and he decided to return to the retail world. On his way out, Newman convinced the RKO executives that Stevenson should be his replacement and in September 1936, Stevenson inked his first contract as an exclusive designer with RKO.

=== The House Designer ===
Stevenson toiled as the nominal head of RKO's costume and wardrobe department from late 1936 to early 1949, enduring the same difficult conditions that Plunkett had before him. Although he was considered RKO's house designer, he was frequently passed over for high-profile assignments to satisfy a star performer's reliance on or preference for a particular designer. For instance, Walter Plunkett's special relationship with Katharine Hepburn ensured his return to RKO as a guest designer for all three of her films shot in 1936. Ginger Rogers also routinely requested outside designers.

Stevenson's fortune wasn't all bad. It was during this time that he forged deeply respectful relationships with budding stars Marueen O'Hara and Lucille Ball, relationships that would prove crucial to his later career. He also dressed the Metropolitan Opera's star coloratura soprano Lily Pons in the final two of her three films for RKO. Additionally, he was assigned to films destined to become classics, films such as Gunga Din (1939), Love Affair (1939), and Alfred Hitchcock's Suspicion (1941).

In August 1939, RKO signed 24 year-old Orson Welles to write, direct, and star in three projects, the first films he would ever make. Citizen Kane and The Magnificent Ambersons (1942), two highly influential and respected movies in classic American cinema, were the eventual results of his efforts. Welles chose Stevenson to costume the films. Both pictures required thorough research to accurately represent the periods depicted, though Stevenson faced many difficulties in carrying out his original intentions. In Citizen Kane, he was required to hide Dorothy Comingore’s pregnancy which became increasingly difficult as the pregnancy and filming progressed. He coped by supplying her with a muff to carry and by letting out many of her waistline seams, though both of these solutions compromised the integrity of his designs. Wartime fabric shortages hampered Stevenson’s design efforts for The Magnificent Ambersons, and he was also asked to make modifications to some to make them more glamorous.

=== A New York Minute ===
By 1942, RKO was on the brink of total financial collapse. Stevenson had weathered RKO’s volatile leadership culture for six years and was hungry for something different and potentially more stable. He had learned from his predecessors that the ready-to-wear market could provide more security and money so like Plunkett and Newman before him, he left RKO to try his fortunes elsewhere, staying until his contract ended with the completion of filming on Journey Into Fear (1943) in March of 1942. Stevenson was in New York in May, 1942 to participate in Bernard Waldman’s fashion show, an event that adumbrated the first New York fashion "Press Week" a year later. That effort didn't bear the fruit Stevenson had hoped for and by January 1943, he was back at RKO.

=== Homecoming ===
Stevenson resumed his duties as head of RKO's costume and wardrobe at a time of both relative stability and dynamic creativity. These were the years of Val Lewton’s famous “horror” unit, Shirley Temple’s attempt to transition from child star to ingénue roles, heavy borrowing of star performers from other studios, and the rise of film noir. Stevenson was involved in all of this, costuming The Curse of the Cat People (1944), The Bachelor and the Bobby Soxer (1947), Government Girl (1944), and Out of the Past (1947), among others. Stevenson also costumed The Spanish Main (1945) with Maureen O’Hara, RKO's first all-Technicolor film since Becky Sharp (1935).

== Oscar Nominations ==
All 3 were for Best Costumes.

- 24th Academy Awards-Nominated for The Mudlark (in Black and White Costumes). Nomination shared with Margaret Furse. Lost to A Place in the Sun.
- 24th Academy Awards-Nominated for David and Bathsheba. This was for color costumes. Nomination shared with Charles LeMaire. Lost to An American in Paris.
- 33rd Academy Awards-The Facts of Life. This was for black and white costumes. Shared with Edith Head. Won.

== Personal life ==
He was friends with actress Lucille Ball for whom he designed costumes starting in her early days at RKO.
