= His Girl Friday =

1940 film by Howard Hawks

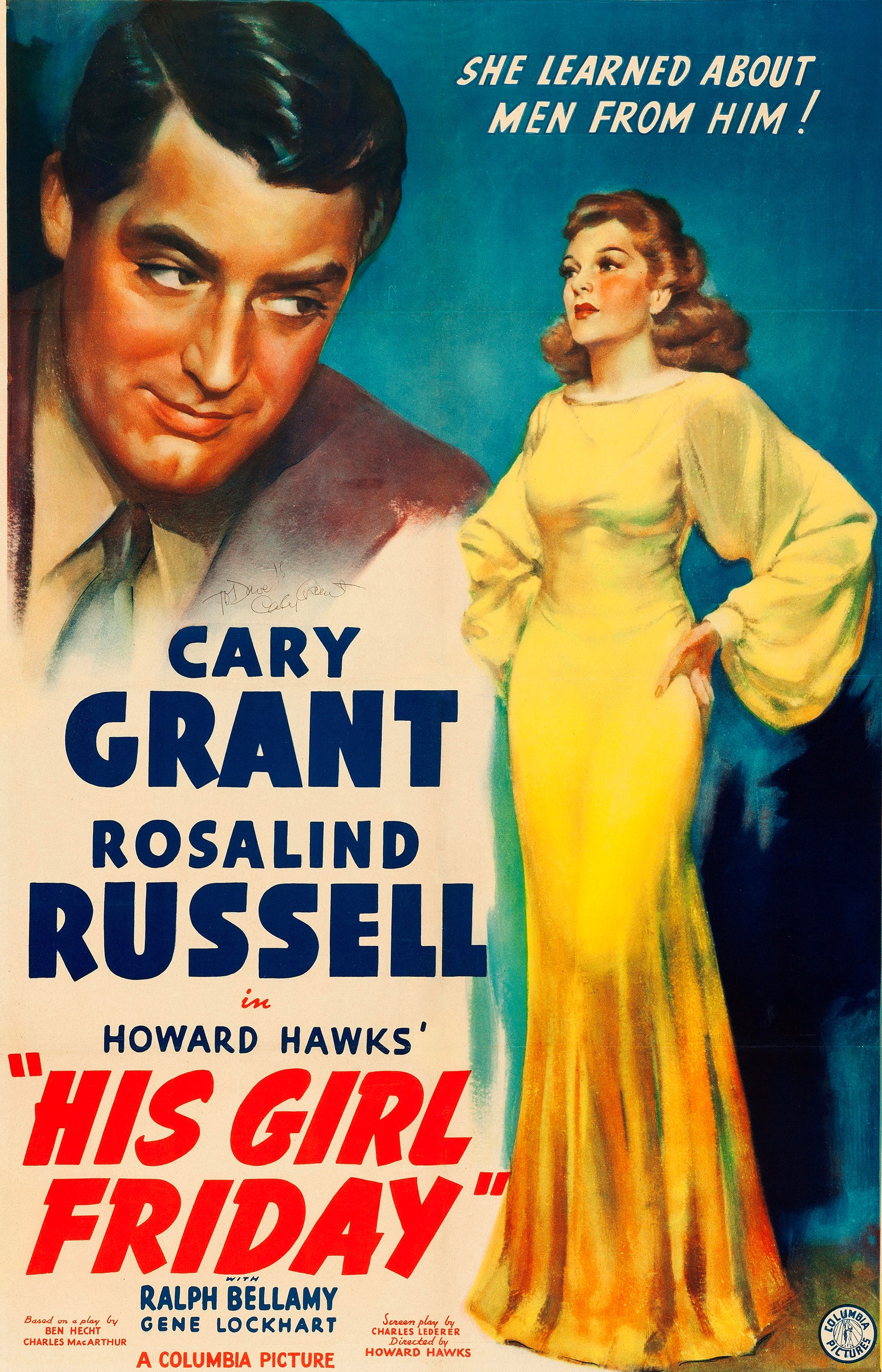
- Theatrical release poster
- Directed by: Howard Hawks
- Screenplay by: Charles Lederer
- Based on: The Front Page; 1928 play by Ben Hecht (Note: Hecht was also heavily involved with the writing of the screenplay, but was not credited for his contributions.); Charles MacArthur
- Produced by: Howard Hawks
- Starring: Cary Grant; Rosalind Russell; Ralph Bellamy; Gene Lockhart
- Cinematography: Joseph Walker
- Edited by: Gene Havlick
- Production company: Columbia Pictures
- Distributed by: Columbia Pictures
- Release date: January 18, 1940
- Running time: 92 minutes
- Country: United States
- Language: English

His Girl Friday is a 1940 American screwball comedy film directed by Howard Hawks, starring Cary Grant and Rosalind Russell and featuring Ralph Bellamy and Gene Lockhart. It was released by Columbia Pictures. The plot centers on a newspaper editor named Walter Burns who is about to lose his ace reporter and ex-wife, Hildy Johnson, newly engaged to another man. Burns suggests they cover one more story together, getting themselves entangled in the case of murderer Earl Williams as Burns desperately tries to win back his wife. The screenplay was adapted from the 1928 play The Front Page by Ben Hecht and Charles MacArthur. This was the second time the play had been adapted for the screen, the first occasion being the 1931 film which kept the original title The Front Page.

The script for His Girl Friday was written by Charles Lederer, with the biggest alteration to the source material being the change of Hildy Johnson's gender, an idea introduced by Hawks. Filming began in September 1939 and finished in November, seven days behind schedule. Production was delayed because the frequent improvisation and numerous ensemble scenes required many retakes. Hawks encouraged his actors to be aggressive and spontaneous. His Girl Friday has been noted for its surprises, comedy, and rapid, overlapping dialogue. Hawks was determined to break the record for the fastest film dialogue, at the time held by The Front Page. He used a sound mixer on the set to increase the speed of dialogue and held a showing of the two films next to each other to prove how fast his film was.

His Girl Friday was No. 19 on American Film Institute's 100 Years ... 100 Laughs and was selected in 1993 for preservation in the United States National Film Registry of the Library of Congress as "culturally, historically, or aesthetically significant". The film entered the public domain in 1969 because the copyright was not renewed; the play it was based on remained under copyright for several decades until it expired in 2024, fully releasing the film from remaining copyright. It has often been considered one of the best comedy films of all time.

== Plot ==
His Girl Friday (1940)

Sly newspaper editor Walter Burns learns that his ex-wife and former star reporter, Hildy Johnson, is about to marry insurance man Bruce Baldwin and settle down as a housewife in Albany. Determined to sabotage these plans, Walter convinces a reluctant Hildy to cover one last story: the pending execution of Earl Williams, who has been convicted of murdering a black policeman. Walter maintains that Williams is innocent and that the city fathers are only going through with the execution to curry favor with black voters. Hildy accepts the assignment on the condition that Walter buy a life insurance policy from Bruce. Wary of Walter and his pickpocket associate, Louie, she takes charge of the $500 that Bruce is carrying and instructs him to hide the insurance check in the lining of his hat.

While Hildy works on a story sympathetic to Williams (arguing that he acted on an irresistible impulse), Walter does everything he can to keep Bruce from taking her to Albany. Using Louie, he plants a watch on Bruce and has him arrested for theft, forcing Hildy to bail him out of jail. Exasperated, she quits. Williams then escapes by stealing the sheriff's gun during a botched reenactment of his crime, which triggers her journalistic instincts. Using $450 of Bruce's money, she buys the story from the warden and continues reporting. Walter sends Louie to reimburse Bruce with counterfeit money and then has blonde associate Evangeline accuse Bruce of "mashing" her, causing him to be sent back to jail.

Meanwhile, a messenger from the governor arrives at the mayor's office with a reprieve for Williams. The mayor, who is determined to see Williams hanged, bribes the messenger to keep hold of the reprieve until it is too late. Suddenly, Williams enters the window of the press room where Hildy is working. To protect her scoop, she hides him in a rolltop desk, notifies Walter, and puts off bailing out Bruce. Williams's girlfriend, Molly, arrives on the scene and helps them evade detection.

Mrs. Baldwin, Hildy's future mother-in-law, enters the press room, having eluded a kidnapper sent by Walter. She reveals to the assembled crowd (which includes the mayor) that Hildy is sheltering Williams. To create a distraction, Molly jumps out the window, wounded, but surviving the fall. Following this, Mrs. Baldwin reappears and accuses Walter of trying to kidnap her once more. Denying the charge emphatically, Walter pounds on the desk three times, unintentionally giving Williams the signal to emerge. Williams is taken back to his cell, and Walter and Hildy are arrested for abetting his escape. At this point, the messenger returns with the reprieve, telling the mayor that he has decided not to take the bribe after all. Walter uses this revelation to blackmail the mayor into letting them go.

Walter tells Hildy she is free to leave with Bruce. Dejected by this, Hildy realizes she still loves Walter and is not ready to give up her career. Bruce then calls to say he has been arrested again, this time for carrying counterfeit money. Recognizing Walter's ploy, Hildy is relieved he never intended to let her go. Walter proposes again to Hildy, promising to take her on the honeymoon they never had in Niagara Falls. He then learns of a strike in Albany, on the way to Niagara Falls. Hildy agrees to honeymoon in Albany, accepting that Walter will never change.

== Cast ==
- Cary Grant as Walter Burns
- Rosalind Russell as Hildegarde "Hildy" Johnson
- Ralph Bellamy as Bruce Baldwin
- Gene Lockhart as Sheriff Hartwell
- Porter Hall as Murphy
- Ernest Truex as Bensinger
- Cliff Edwards as Endicott
- Clarence Kolb as Mayor
- Roscoe Karns as McCue
- Frank Jenks as Wilson
- Regis Toomey as Sanders
- Abner Biberman as Louie
- Frank Orth as Duffy
- John Qualen as Earl Williams
- Helen Mack as Mollie Malloy
- Alma Kruger as Mrs. Baldwin
- Billy Gilbert as Joe Pettibone
- Pat West as Warden Cooley
- Edwin Maxwell as Dr. Eggelhoffer
- Marion Martin as Evangeline (uncredited)

== Production ==
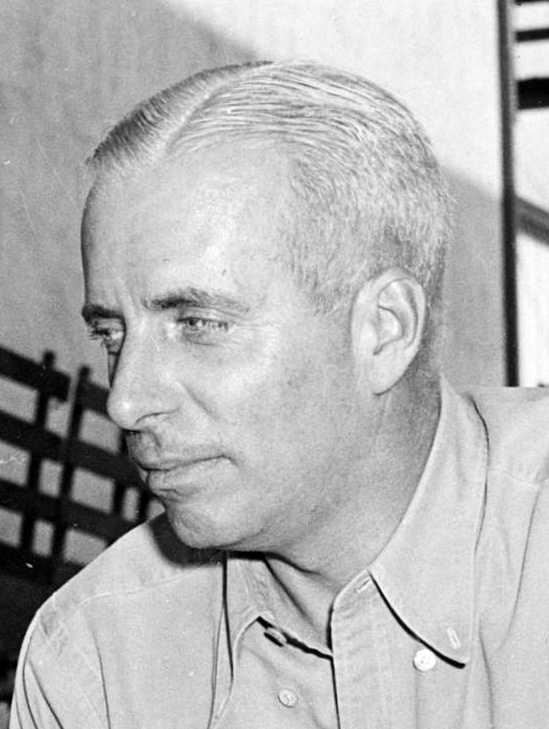
Director Howard Hawks (c. 1940s)

=== Development and writing ===
While producing Only Angels Have Wings (1939), Howard Hawks tried to pitch a remake of The Front Page to Harry Cohn of Columbia Pictures. Cary Grant was almost immediately cast in the film, but Cohn initially intended Grant to play the reporter, with radio commentator Walter Winchell as the editor. Hawks's production that became His Girl Friday was originally intended to be a straightforward adaptation of The Front Page, with both the editor and reporter being male. (Note: A "girl Friday" is an assistant who carries out a variety of chores. The name alludes to "Friday", Robinson Crusoe's native male dogsbody in Daniel Defoe's novel. According to Merriam-Webster's, the term was first used in 1928 (12 years before the film was released).) During auditions, Howard Hawks's secretary, a woman, read reporter Hildy Johnson's lines. Hawks liked the way the dialogue sounded coming from a woman, resulting in the script being rewritten to make Hildy female and the ex-wife of editor Walter Burns played by Cary Grant. Cohn purchased the rights for The Front Page in January 1939.

Although Hawks considered the dialogue of The Front Page to be "the finest modern dialogue that had been written", more than half of it was replaced with what Hawks believed to be better lines. Some of the original dialogue was left the same, as were all of the characters' names with two exceptions: Hildy's fiancé (now no longer a fiancée) was given the name Bruce Baldwin, and the name of the comic messenger bringing the pardon from the governor was changed from Pincus to Pettibone. Harry Cohn of Columbia Pictures approved Hawks's idea for the film project. Ben Hecht and Charles MacArthur, the writers of the original play, were unavailable for screenwriting. Consequently, Hawks considered Gene Fowler as the screenwriter, but he declined the job because he disliked the changes to the screenplay Hawks intended to make. Hawks instead recruited Charles Lederer, who had worked on the adaptation for The Front Page, to work on the screenplay. Though he was not credited, Hecht assisted Lederer in the adaptation. Additions were made at the beginning of the screenplay by Lederer to give the characters a convincing backstory; it was decided that Hildy and Walter would be divorced with Hildy's intentions of remarriage serving as Walter's motivation to win her back.

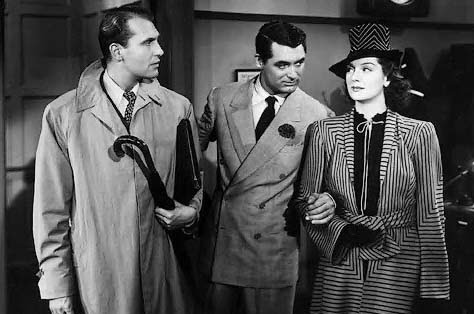
Walter Burns meets Hildy's fiance, Bruce Baldwin. Left to right: Ralph Bellamy, Cary Grant and Rosalind Russell

During writing, Hawks was in Palm Springs directing Only Angels Have Wings, but stayed in close contact with Lederer and Hecht. Hecht helped Lederer with some organizational revisions, and Lederer finished the script on May 22. After two more drafts completed by July, Hawks called Morrie Ryskind to revise the dialogue and make it more interesting. Ryskind revised the script throughout the summer and finished by the end of September before filming began. More than half of the original dialogue was rewritten. The film lacks one of the well-known final lines of the play, "the son-of-a-bitch stole my watch!", because films of the time were more censored than Pre-Code Hollywood films, and Hawks felt that the line was too overused. Ryskind developed a new ending in which Walter and Hildy start fighting immediately after saying "I do" in the wedding they hold in the newsroom, with one of the characters stating, "I think it's gonna turn out all right this time." However, after revealing the ending to a few writers at Columbia one evening, Ryskind was surprised to hear that his ending was filmed on another set a few days later. Forced to create another ending, Ryskind ended up thanking the anonymous Columbia writer, because he felt that his ending and one of his final lines, "I wonder if Bruce can put us up", were better than what he had written originally. After reviewing the screenplay, the Hays Office saw no issues with the film, besides a few derogatory comments towards newsmen and some illegal behavior of the characters. During some rewrites for censors, Hawks focused on finding a lead actress for his film.

=== Casting ===
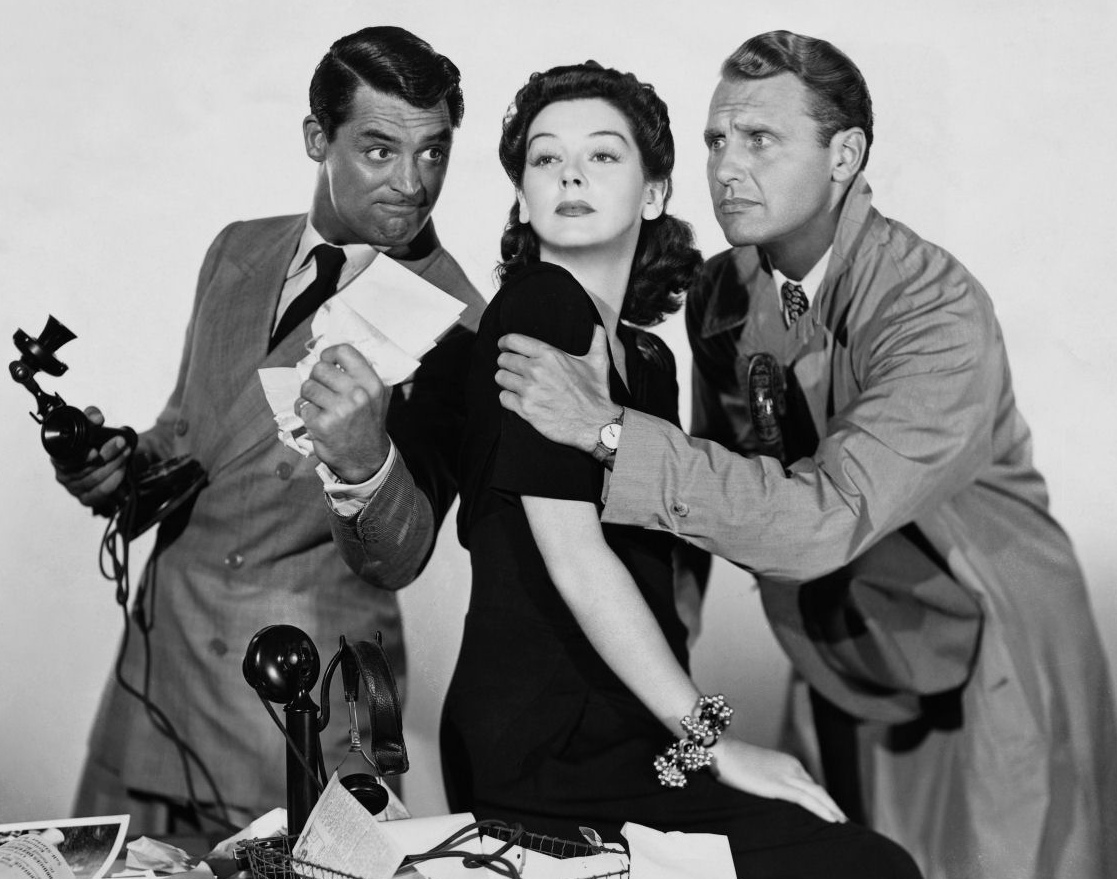
Cary Grant, Rosalind Russell, and Ralph Bellamy in a promotional picture for the film

Hawks had difficulty casting His Girl Friday. While the choice of Cary Grant was almost instantaneous, the casting of Hildy was a more extended process. At first, Hawks wanted Carole Lombard, whom he had directed in the screwball comedy Twentieth Century (1934), but the cost of hiring Lombard in her new status as a freelancer proved to be far too high, and Columbia could not afford her. Katharine Hepburn, Claudette Colbert, Margaret Tallichet, Margaret Sullavan, Ginger Rogers, Lana Turner, and Irene Dunne were offered the role, but turned it down. Dunne rejected the role because she felt the part was too small and needed to be expanded. Jean Arthur was suspended by the studio when she refused to take it. Joan Crawford reportedly was considered. Hawks then turned to Rosalind Russell, who had just finished MGM's The Women (1939). Russell was upset when she discovered from a New York Times article that Cohn was "stuck" with her after attempting to cast many other actresses. Before Russell's first meeting with Hawks, to show her apathy, she took a swim and entered his office with wet hair, causing him to do a "triple take". Russell confronted him about this casting issue; he dismissed her quickly and asked her to go to wardrobe.

=== Filming ===
After makeup, wardrobe, and photography tests, filming began on 27 September 1939. The film had the working title of The Bigger They Are.

The film is noted for its rapid-fire repartee, using overlapping dialogue to make conversations sound more realistic, with one character speaking before another finishes. Although overlapping dialogue is specified and cued in the 1928 play script by Hecht and MacArthur, Hawks told Peter Bogdanovich:

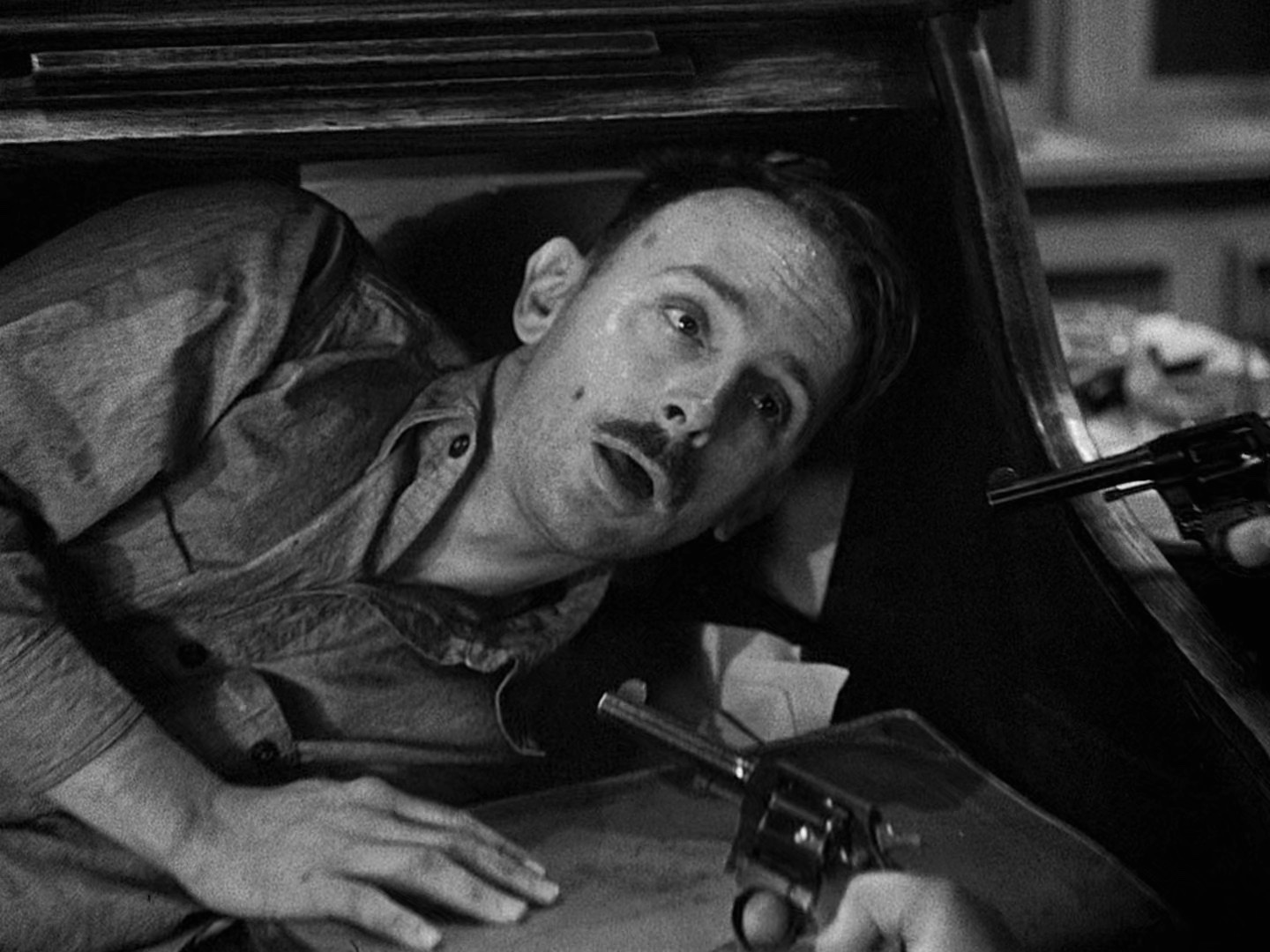
John Qualen playing escaped convict Earl Williams, who is discovered hiding in a rolltop desk

I had noticed that when people talk, they talk over one another, especially people who talk fast or who are arguing or describing something. So we wrote the dialogue in a way that made the beginnings and ends of sentences unnecessary; they were there for overlapping.

To get the effect he wanted, as multi-track sound recording was not yet available at the time, Hawks had the sound mixer on the set turn the various overhead microphones on and off as required for the scene, as many as 35 times. Reportedly, the film was sped up because of a challenge Hawks took upon himself to break the record for the fastest dialogue on screen, at the time held by The Front Page. Hawks arranged a showing for newsmen of the two films next to each other to prove how fast his dialogue was.

Hawks gave the actors the freedom to improvise some of their lines and actions, as he did with his comedies more than his dramas. In her autobiography Life Is a Banquet, Russell wrote that she thought she did not have as many good lines as Grant, so she hired her own writer to "punch up" her dialogue. With Hawks encouraging ad-libbing, she was able to slip her writer's work into the movie. Only Grant was wise to this tactic and greeted her each morning with "What have you got today?" Her ghostwriter gave her some of the lines for the restaurant scene, which is unique to His Girl Friday. It was one of the most complicated scenes to film; because of the rapidity of the dialogue the actors actually ate very little during the scene. Hawks shot this scene with one camera a week and a half into production, and it took four days to film instead of the intended two. The improvisations made it difficult for the cinematographers to know what the characters were going to do. Russell was also difficult to film because her lack of a sharp jawline required makeup artists to paint and blend a dark line under her jawline while shining a light on her face to simulate a more youthful appearance.

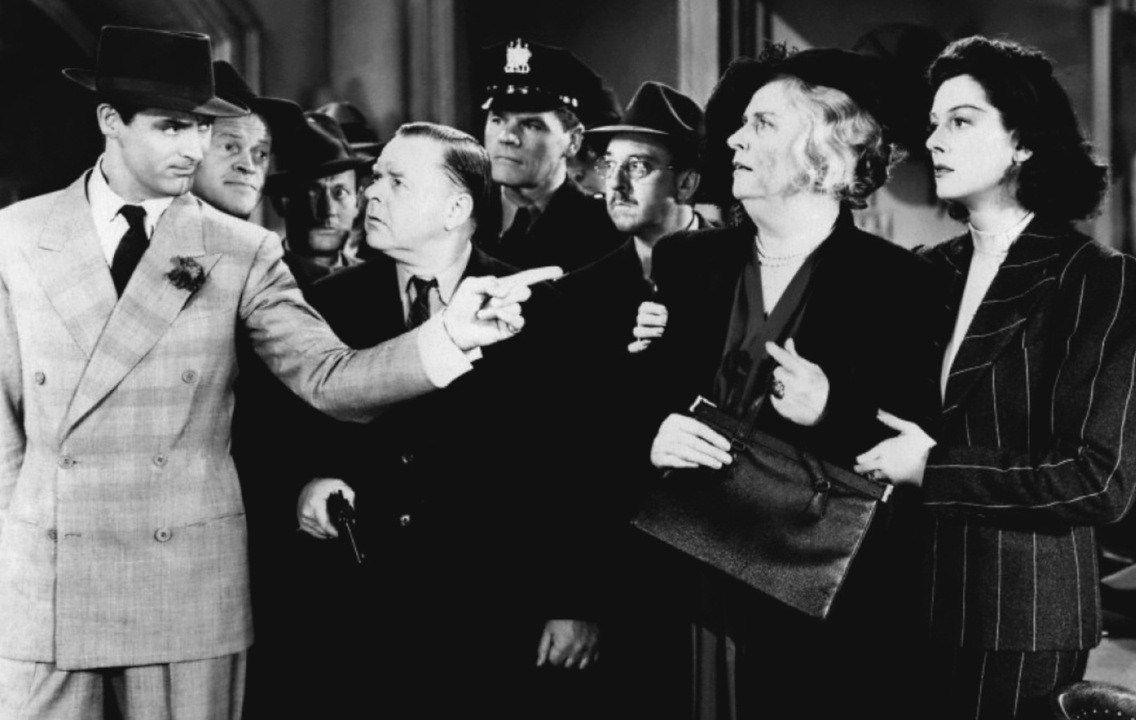
Walter denies Mrs. Baldwin's accusation that he arranged to kidnap her. Left to right: Cary Grant, Frank Jenks, Roscoe Karns, Gene Lockhart, Pat Flaherty, Porter Hall, Alma Kruger, and Rosalind Russell

Hawks encouraged aggressiveness and unexpectedness in the acting, breaking the fourth wall a few times in the film. At one point, Grant broke character because of something unscripted that Russell did and looked directly at the camera, saying "Is she going to do that?" Hawks decided to leave this scene in, although it does not appear in the final cut.

Owing to the numerous ensemble scenes, many retakes were necessary. Having learned from Bringing Up Baby (1938), Hawks added some straight supporting characters in order to balance out the leading characters.

Arthur Rosson worked for three days on second unit footage at Columbia Ranch.

Filming was completed on 21 November 1939, seven days past schedule.

Unusually for the time period, the film contains no music except for the music that leads to the final fade out of the film.

==== Ad-libs by Grant ====
Grant's character describes Bellamy's character by saying "He looks like that fellow in the movies, you know ... Ralph Bellamy!" According to Bellamy, the remark was ad-libbed by Grant. Columbia studio head Harry Cohn thought it was too cheeky and ordered it removed, but Hawks insisted that it stay. Grant makes several other "inside" remarks in the film. When his character is arrested for kidnapping, he describes the horrendous fate suffered by the last person who crossed him: Archie Leach (Grant's birth name). When Earl Williams attempts to climb out of the rolltop desk in which he has been hiding, Grant's character tells him, "Get back in there, you mock turtle!" Grant played the Mock Turtle in the 1933 film version of Alice in Wonderland, which might lead one to imagine that he had improvised it, but the line also figures in the 1931 film of The Front Page.

== Release ==
His Girl Friday (1940) by Howard Hawks, trailer

Release of the film was rushed by Cohn and a sneak preview of the film was held in December, with a press screening on January 3, 1940. His Girl Friday premiered in New York City at Radio City Music Hall on January 11, 1940, and went into general American release a week later.

== Reception ==
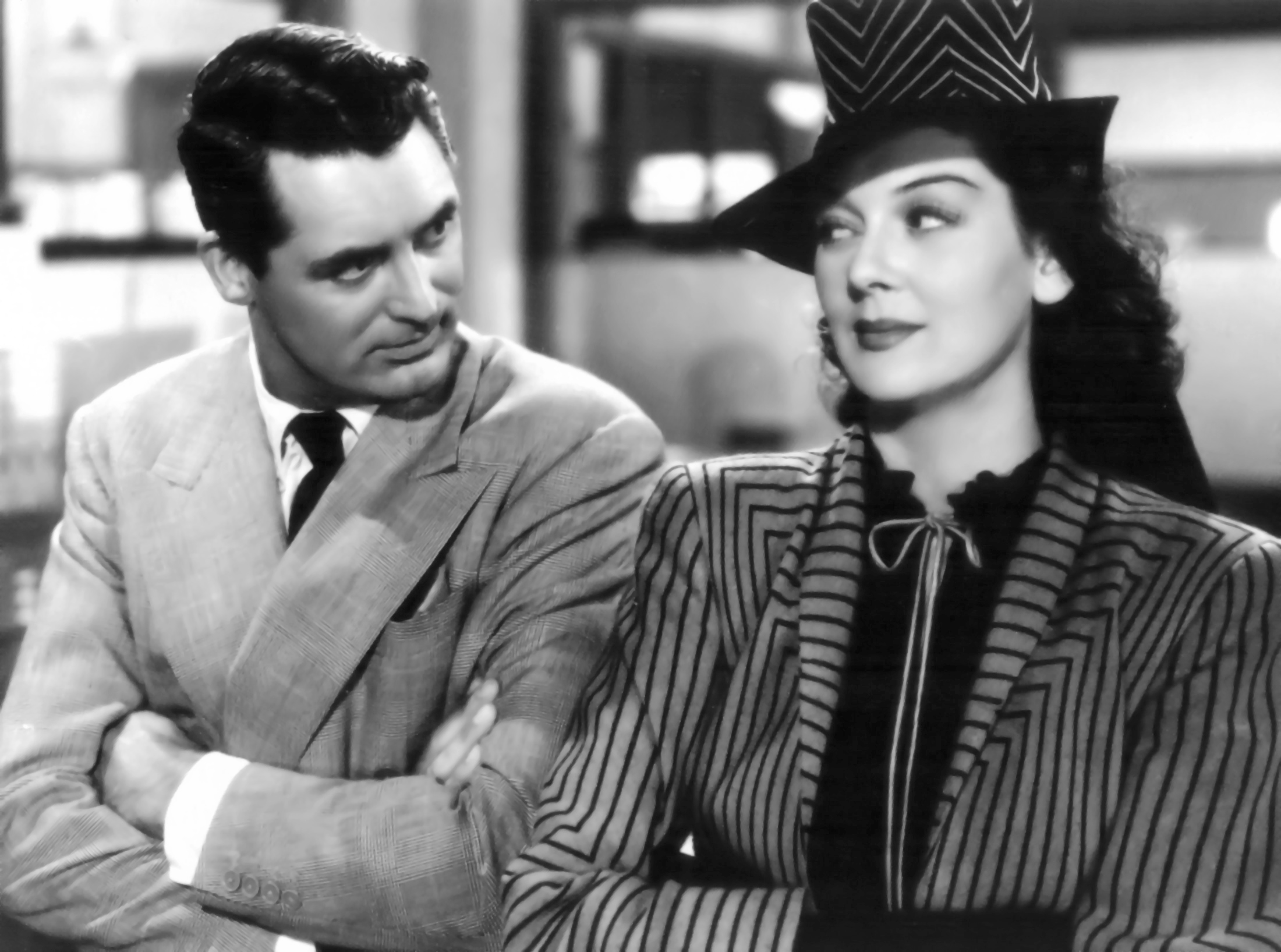
Cary Grant with Rosalind Russell; Russell wears a costume designed by Robert Kalloch.

Contemporary reviews from critics were very positive. Critics were particularly impressed by the gender change of the reporter. Frank S. Nugent of The New York Times wrote "Except to add that we've seen The Front Page under its own name and others so often before we've grown a little tired of it, we don't mind conceding His Girl Friday is a bold-faced reprint of what was once—and still remains—the maddest newspaper comedy of our times." The Variety reviewer wrote "The trappings are different—even to the extent of making reporter Hildy Johnson a femme—but it is still Front Page and Columbia need not regret it. Charles Leder (sic) has done an excellent screenwriting job on it and producer-director Howard Hawks has made a film that can stand alone almost anywhere and grab healthy grosses." Harrison's Reports wrote "Even though the story and its development will be familiar to those who saw the first version of The Front Page, they will be entertained just the same, for the action is so exciting that it holds one in tense suspense throughout." Film Daily wrote "Given a snappy pace, a top flight cast, good production and able direction, the film has all the necessary qualities for first-rate entertainment for any type of audience." John Mosher of The New Yorker wrote that after years of "feeble, wispy, sad imitations" of The Front Page, he found this authentic adaptation of the original to be "as fresh and undated and bright a film as you could want". Louis Marcorelles called His Girl Friday "le film américain par excellence".

Pauline Kael was enthusiastic: "Overlapping dialogue carries the movie along at breakneck speed ... as this race of brittle, cynical, childish people rush around on corrupt errands. Russell is at her comedy peak here ... And, as Walter Burns, Grant raises mugging to a joyful art ... His Burns is a strong-arm performance, defiantly self-centered and funny." In his book Leonard Maltin's Movie Guide, film critic Leonard Maltin gave it four of four stars: "Splendid comedy ... Terrific character actors add sparkle to must-see film .... " Leslie Halliwell gave it one of his rare four of four stars: "Frantic, hilarious black farce with all participants at their best, possibly the fastest comedy ever filmed, and one of the funniest."

On Rotten Tomatoes, the film holds an approval rating of 99% based on 107 reviews. The website's critics consensus reads: "Anchored by stellar performances from Cary Grant and Rosalind Russell, His Girl Friday is possibly the definitive screwball romantic comedy." Metacritic, which uses a weighted average, assigned the film a score of 94 out of 100, based on 20 critics, indicating "universal acclaim".

In 2006, Writers Guild of America West ranked its screenplay 31st in WGA's list of 101 Greatest Screenplays. In the 2012 Sight & Sound poll of the greatest films of all time, His Girl Friday appeared on several lists, including those of critic David Thomson and director Quentin Tarantino. In the 2022 Sight & Sound poll of the greatest films of all time, the film was ranked 129th, tying with Fanny and Alexander, Raging Bull, and Pulp Fiction.

== Interpretation and themes ==
=== Story ===
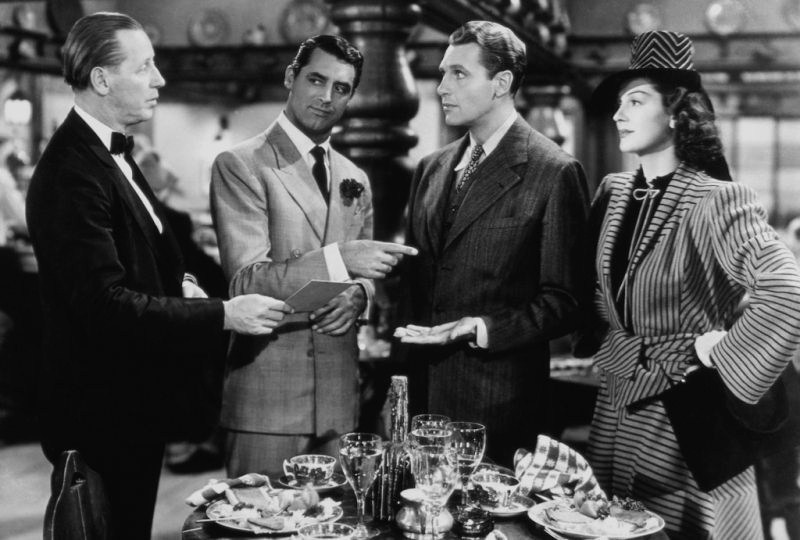
Walter delays Hildy's departure with her insurance salesman fiancé by agreeing to buy a large insurance policy. Irving Bacon, Cary Grant, Ralph Bellamy and Rosalind Russell

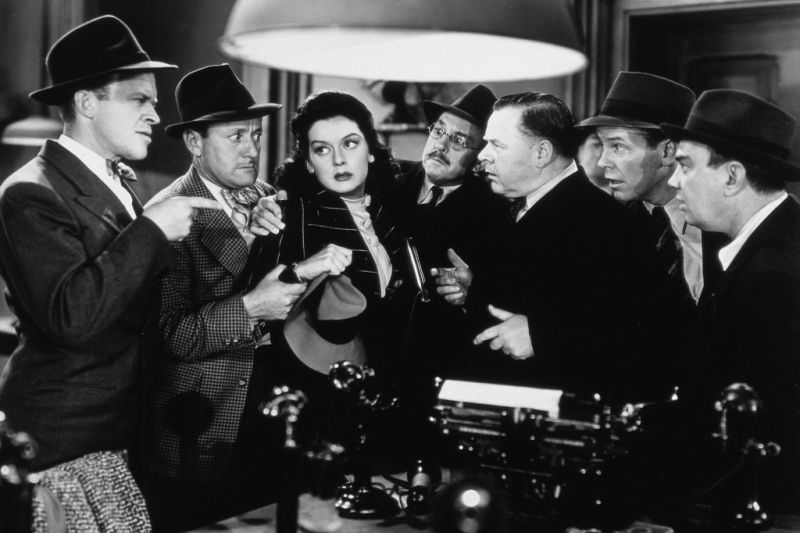
To delay Hildy's departure, Walter appeals to her journalistic instincts. Frank Jenks, Roscoe Karns, Rosalind Russell, Porter Hall, Gene Lockhart, Regis Toomey, and Cliff Edwards

The title His Girl Friday is an ironic title, because a girl "Friday" represents a servant of a master, but Hildy is not a servant in the film, but rather the equal to Walter. The world in this film is not determined by gender, but rather by intelligence and capability. At the beginning of the film, Hildy says that she wants to be "treated like a woman", but her return to her profession reveals her true desire to live a different life. In His Girl Friday, even though the characters remarry, Hawks displays an aversion to marriage, home, and family through his approach to the film. Specific, exclusionary camera work and character control of the frame and the dialogue portray a subtle criticism of domesticity. The subject of domesticity is fairly absent throughout the film. Even among the relationships between Grant and Russell and Bellamy and Russell, the relationships are positioned within a larger frame of the male-dominated newsroom. The film, like many comedies, celebrates difficult, tumultuous love rather than secure, suburban love through its preference for movement and argument rather than silent poise. Film critic Molly Haskell wrote that the scene near the end of the film when Hildy sheds tears was not included to expose her femininity, but to express the confusion she felt due to the collision of her professional and feminine natures. The feminine side of Hildy desires to be subservient and sexually desirable to men, while the other side of Hildy desires assertion and to forfeit the stereotypical duties of a woman. Her tears represent her emotional helplessness and inability to express anger to a male authority figure.

A commonality in many Howard Hawks films is the revelation of the amorality of the main character and a failure of that character to change or develop. In His Girl Friday, Walter Burns manipulates, acts selfishly, frames his ex-wife's fiancé, and orchestrates the kidnapping of an elderly woman. Even at the end of the film, Burns convinces Hildy Johnson to remarry him despite how much she loathes him and his questionable actions. Upon the resumption of their relationship, there is no romance visible between them. They do not kiss, embrace, or even gaze at each other. It is evident that Burns is still the same person he was in their previous relationship as he quickly waves off the plans for the honeymoon that they never had in pursuit of a new story. Additionally, he walks in front of her when exiting the room, forcing her to carry her own suitcase despite Johnson already having criticized this at the beginning of the film. This hints that the marriage is fated to face the same problems that ended it previously.

Hawks is known for his use of repeated or intentional gestures in his films. In His Girl Friday, the cigarette in the scene between Hildy and Earl Williams serves several symbolic roles in the film. First, the cigarette establishes a link between the characters when Williams accepts the cigarette even though he does not smoke. However, the fact that he doesn't smoke, and they don't share the cigarette shows the difference between and separation of the worlds in which the two characters live.

The film contains two main plots: the personal and the professional. Walter induces Hildy to get back in the beat in the paper's attempt to scoop the story of murderer Earl Williams; the concurrent plot is Walter attempting to scuttle Hildy's upcoming marriage. The speed of the film results in snappy and overlapping dialogue among interruptions and rapid speech. Gesture, character and camera movement, as well as editing, serve to complement the dialogue in increasing the pace of the film. There is a clear contrast between the fast-talking Hildy and Walter and slow-talking Bruce and Earl. The average word per minute count of the film is 240 while the average American speech is around 140 words per minute. There are nine scenes with at least four words per second and at least two with more than five words per second. Hawks attached verbal tags before and after specific script lines so the actors would be able to interrupt and talk over each other without making the necessary dialogue incomprehensible.

Film theorist and historian David Bordwell explained the ending of His Girl Friday as a "closure effect" rather than a closure. The ending of the film is rather circular, and there is no development of characters, specifically Walter Burns, and the film ends similarly to the way in which it starts. Additionally, the film ends with a brief epilogue in which Walter announces their remarriage and reveals their intention to go cover a strike in Albany on the way to their honeymoon. The fates of the main characters and even some of the minor characters such as Earl Williams are revealed, although there are minor flaws in the resolution. For example, they do not discuss what happened to Mollie Malloy after the conflict is resolved. However, the main characters' endings were wrapped up so neatly that it overshadows the need for the minor characters' endings to be wrapped up. This creates a "closure effect" or an appearance of closure.

=== Editing style ===
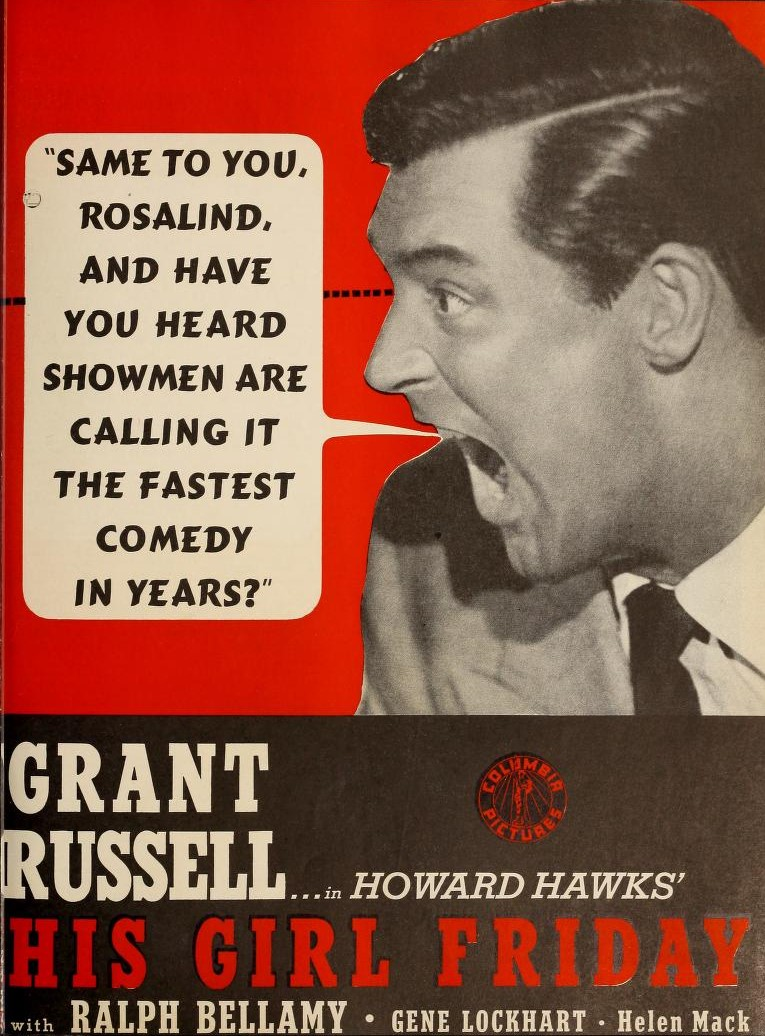
Magazine ad for the film

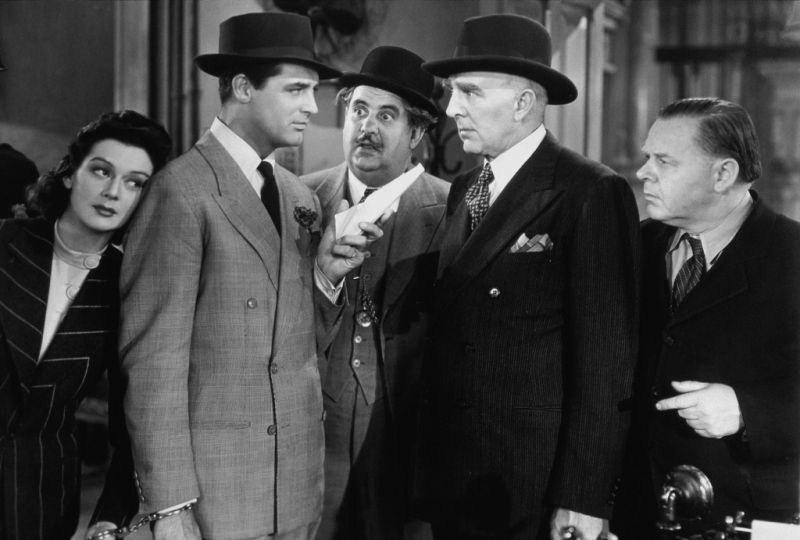
Walter confronts the mayor, who bribed the governor's messenger to hold back a stay of execution. Rosalind Russell, Cary Grant, Billy Gilbert, Clarence Kolb and Gene Lockhart

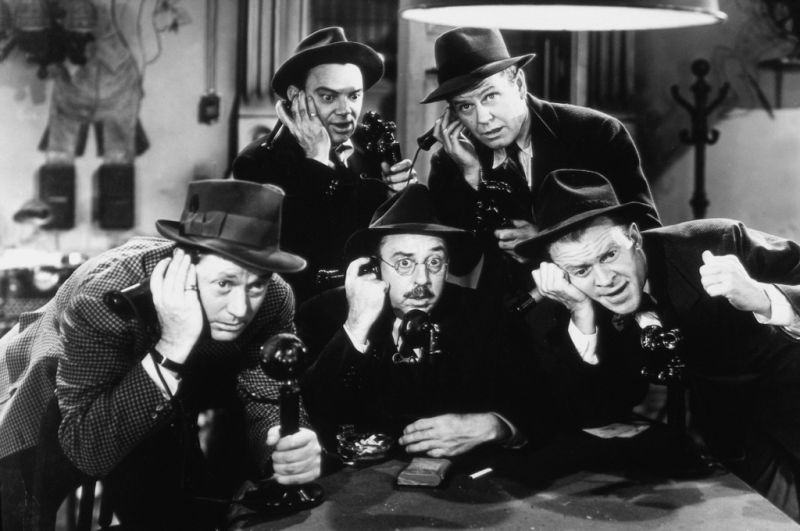
Hildy's competitors in the pool of reporters. Roscoe Karns, Cliff Edwards, Porter Hall, Regis Toomey, and Frank Jenks

His Girl Friday is a movie intentioned for speed: it set the record on fastest words spoken per minute in a movie. A second to appreciate the moment is a foregone luxury in the whirlwind nature of the publishing business. Dissecting one of the scenes from the movie to best display the editing style, consider the specific scene where Earl Williams escapes. Howard Hawks emphasizes the pace difference between Hildy's two possible lives, by having plot elements and staging mirror the editing, where slow and languid moments are interspersed with sub-second shots of newsworthy freneticism. To emphasize the contrast of rhythm between Hildy's domestic life with Bruce versus her dynamic life with Walter, the director mirrors with editing techniques like lengthier contemplative shots versus rapid fire shots, matches on action versus elliptical shots with continuous diegetic sound, and scenes with one element of focus versus several different objects and sounds splitting our attention.

The scene opens with two lengthy (10 second) shots of Hildy describing her life outside the newsroom—the shots reinforce the idea that the life with Bruce will be predictable and slowly paced. As Hildy looks off away from the camera for the first time, literally turning her back on the newspaper life for just an instant, her attention is snapped back to the newsroom as shots are fired. Immediately, the editing reflects the newfound fast pace: from slow pans to static shots with the only movement being Hildy's slow walking, the movie immediately shifts to dynamic shots with several people's movements on the street, as well as gunshots, ducking, spotlight-exaggerated lighting shifts, and shouting with the men in the window. The medium shots of the frantic news reporters are in contrast with a now obscured long shot of Hildy—while previously she was the main character and source of sound, the director makes it clear that she will be suddenly relegated to the background when the action is happening: her background presence is obscured by a frosted window, and her sounds obscured by the frenzy of the gunshots and shouting.

Upon revealing that Earl Williams has escaped, the movie then shifts from multi-second shots to sub-second shots as the news editors enter maximum monkey mode. As gunshots provide a diegetic backdrop of time, ellipses shots become more obvious; the first reporter immediately cuts from reaching the table to talking on the phone. The next 5 shots are also sub-second close-ups of newsmen yelling into phones. As she is slowly drawn into this world again, Hildy begins to occupy more of the frame—going from a long shot to a medium shot as the newsmen stream past her. Once the men are gone, the longest shot of the sequence ensues: 16 seconds as she closes the distance she created from her old life, shedding her coat, symbolizing her chilly life in Albany, to reveal the reporter-ready dress underneath, the person she truly is. She fully reunites with it as she picks up the phone to talk to Walter, then rushes out of the room with the same fervor as the news folk. The camera cements this final switch as the dolly moves out, and a crossfade ensues on her running out, unlike all the prior cuts.

Finally it concludes using shots of gates opening, cars streaming out, and people running. Here, Hawks's shots are not just fast—they are explicit about being faster than time. A diegetic siren delineates unit seconds as cars screech, but the film shows the abbreviated ellipses shot of the gate closing, skipping the time with a shot of guards running. This sequence is faster than real time, and the contrast with the siren shows how time in the news reporters world is faster paced than the world around them. Hildy joins the chaos shouting "HEY!", providing a final contrast to the start of the scene where she described the idyllic and calm city life she was originally headed for.

Throughout this sequence, Hawks is explicit about the passage of time and focus of characters through his edits and mocks the slow Albany life Hildy begins with by showcasing the romantic frenzy of news life through shot timing, continuity of action, and shifting attention-grabbing elements.

=== Women reporters ===
According to Pauline Kael, all female reporters in newspaper films are based on Adela Rogers St. Johns.

== Legacy ==
His Girl Friday (often along with Bringing Up Baby and Twentieth Century) is cited as an archetype of the screwball comedy genre. In 1993, the Library of Congress selected His Girl Friday for preservation in the United States National Film Registry. The film ranked 19th on the American Film Institute's 100 Years ... 100 Laughs, a 2000 list of the funniest American comedies. Prior to His Girl Friday, the play The Front Page had been adapted for the screen once before, in the 1931 film, also called The Front Page, produced by Howard Hughes, with Adolphe Menjou and Pat O'Brien in the starring roles. In this first film adaptation of the Broadway play of the same title (written by former Chicago newsmen Ben Hecht and Charles MacArthur), Hildy Johnson was male.

His Girl Friday was dramatized as a one-hour radio play on the September 30, 1940, broadcast of Lux Radio Theatre, with Claudette Colbert, Fred MacMurray and Jack Carson. It was dramatized again with a half-hour version on The Screen Guild Theater on March 30, 1941, with Grant and Russell reprising their film roles. The Front Page was remade in a 1974 Billy Wilder movie starring Walter Matthau as Walter Burns, Jack Lemmon as Hildy Johnson, and Susan Sarandon as his fiancée.

His Girl Friday and the original Hecht and MacArthur play were adapted into another stage play His Girl Friday by playwright John Guare. This was presented at the National Theatre in London from May to November 2003, with Alex Jennings as Burns and Zoë Wanamaker as Hildy. The 1988 film Switching Channels was loosely based on His Girl Friday, with Burt Reynolds in the Walter Burns role, Kathleen Turner in the Hildy Johnson role, and Christopher Reeve in the role of Bruce. In December 2017 Peter Giser, the artistic director of the Snowglobe Theatre, an independent theatre based in Montreal, Canada, adapted the script for the stage, expanded some characters, and made the play more accessible to modern audiences. It was performed that December after Snowglobe obtained copyright status of this adapted version.

Director Quentin Tarantino has named His Girl Friday as one of his favorite movies. In the 2004 French film Notre musique, the film is used by Godard as he explains the basic of filmmaking, specifically the shot reverse shot. As he explains this concept, two stills from His Girl Friday are shown with Cary Grant in one photo and Rosalind Russell in the other. He explains that upon looking closely, the two shots are actually the same shot, "because the director is incapable of seeing the difference between a man and a woman."

Rosalind Russell's performance as Hildy Johnson was cited as the model for the character of Lois Lane in the Superman franchise.

== See also ==
- Public domain film
- List of American films of 1940
- List of films in the public domain in the United States
