= Eli M. Oboler Library =

Idaho State University library

Coordinates: 42.8638°N 112.4323°W

The Eli M. Oboler Library serves the students and faculty of Idaho State University, as well as the local community of Pocatello, Idaho. It is named after Eli M. Oboler, the university's longtime head librarian.

As of 2000, the library's collection contained nearly a million books, periodicals, and government documents; more than 35,000 microfilm reels; more than a million microfiche and micro-cards; 44,000 maps; and nearly 3,000 periodical and newspaper titles.

== History ==
The ISU library in 1918, when it was housed in Swanson Hall

A library has been in place at Idaho State University almost since its creation at the turn of the century. Between 1902 and 1924, the library occupied merely one large room in the now-demolished Swanson Hall. In 1925, the growing library moved to Frazier Hall. When the library outgrew its location in Frazier Hall a new four-story building, the present-day Idaho Museum of Natural History, was constructed and the library moved again in 1954. However, the library rapidly exceeded even this new building's capacity.

Then named simply the ISU Library, the current library building was completed in time for the 1977 fall semester. Designed by Sundberg and Associates, the library cost just over 5 million dollars. Because of the limited funding available at the time, the library director and other faculty conducted a campaign—involving bumper stickers, billboards, and letters to the editors of Idaho newspapers—to convince the state legislature to fund the new library. The library was renamed the Eli M. Oboler Library shortly before Oboler's death in 1983.

At the time of its completion, the library was "the largest academic building in the state" at 175,000 square feet (16,300 m^{2}) and housing 300,000 volumes on 15 miles (24 km) of shelving.

The Eli M. Oboler Library has been a federal depository library since 1908.

== Libraries and collections ==
=== Arthur P. Oliver Law Library ===
Previously located at the Bannock County Courthouse Annex, the Arthur P. Oliver Law Library is now on the third floor of the Oboler Library and contains court reporters, state and federal codes, and legal research materials.

=== Distance locations ===
The Oboler Library maintains satellite locations in Meridian, Twin Falls and Idaho Falls to support Idaho State University distance students.

=== Idaho Health Sciences Library ===
The Idaho Health Sciences Library is located on the third floor of the Oboler Library. The IHSL fields health and health professions questions from ISU students, faculty, and local health providers. The ISHL was created in the early 1990s and is a member of the National Network of Libraries of Medicine.

=== Special Collections ===
Located in the basement of the Oboler Library, Special Collections houses the library's rare books, manuscripts and historic photograph collections, and the University Archives. Special Collections also houses the Inter-mountain West Collection, composed of hundreds of hard-to-find titles chronicling the history of southern Idaho and the surrounding area.

The oldest printed book in the Rare Books Collection is The Sermons of Maister John Calvin on the Booke of Job, printed in 1584. There are other books in the collection thought to be older, but their provenance is incomplete.

==== Special Collections digital archives ====
The Bannock County Images project is a searchable database of historic images of Pocatello, Bannock County, and southeastern Idaho. The Edward Stevenson Collection is a searchable database of images and costume drawings by Edward Stevenson, a Pocatello native who worked as a Hollywood costume designer during the mid-20th century. These two archives can be found on the Special Collections Online page .

A digital collection of works by 18th-century English author Samuel Johnson and his contemporaries is administered by the Oboler Library and the ISU Department of English.
