= Sisters Under the Skin =

1934 film by David Burton

- The Romantic Age
- Directed by: David Burton
- Written by: S. K. Lauren; Jo Swerling
- Starring: Elissa Landi; Frank Morgan; Joseph Schildkraut
- Cinematography: Joseph Black
- Edited by: Gene Milford
- Music by: Louis Silvers
- Production company: Columbia Pictures
- Distributed by: Columbia Pictures
- Release date: April 15, 1934
- Running time: 65 minutes
- Country: United States
- Language: English

Sisters Under the Skin, later renamed The Romantic Age, is a 1934 American drama film directed by David Burton and starring Elissa Landi, Frank Morgan, and Joseph Schildkraut. It was the first film Landi made for Columbia Pictures.

== Plot ==
Millionaire John Hunter Yates tries to recapture his youth by abandoning his business and going to Europe. His wife Elinor refuses to go with him. Yates meets a young actress, Blossom Bailey, and takes her with him. In Paris, Blossom falls for musician Zukowski and they fall in love. Yates tires of the bohemian life, and returns to America with Blossom and Zukowski. At Blossom's urging, he finances Zukowski's musical career, and he becomes famous. Elinor tries to win her husband back, even as Yates becomes certain Blossom and Zukowski are betraying him. Yates discovers Blossom has been true to him, and returns to his wife—allowing Blossom to marry.

== Cast ==
The cast includes:

- Elissa Landi as Judy O'Grady aka Blossom Bailey
- Frank Morgan as John Hunter Yates
- Joseph Schildkraut as Zukowski
- Doris Lloyd as Elinor Yates

== Production ==
Sisters Under the Skin was directed by David Burton, and was the first picture Elissa Landi made for Columbia after being fired by 20th Century Fox. The film was produced under the working title Excursion to Paradise. Robert Kalloch, Columbia Pictures' newly hired chief costume designer, designed Elissa Landi's wardrobe.
