= The Bugle Call =

1927 film by Edward Sedgwick

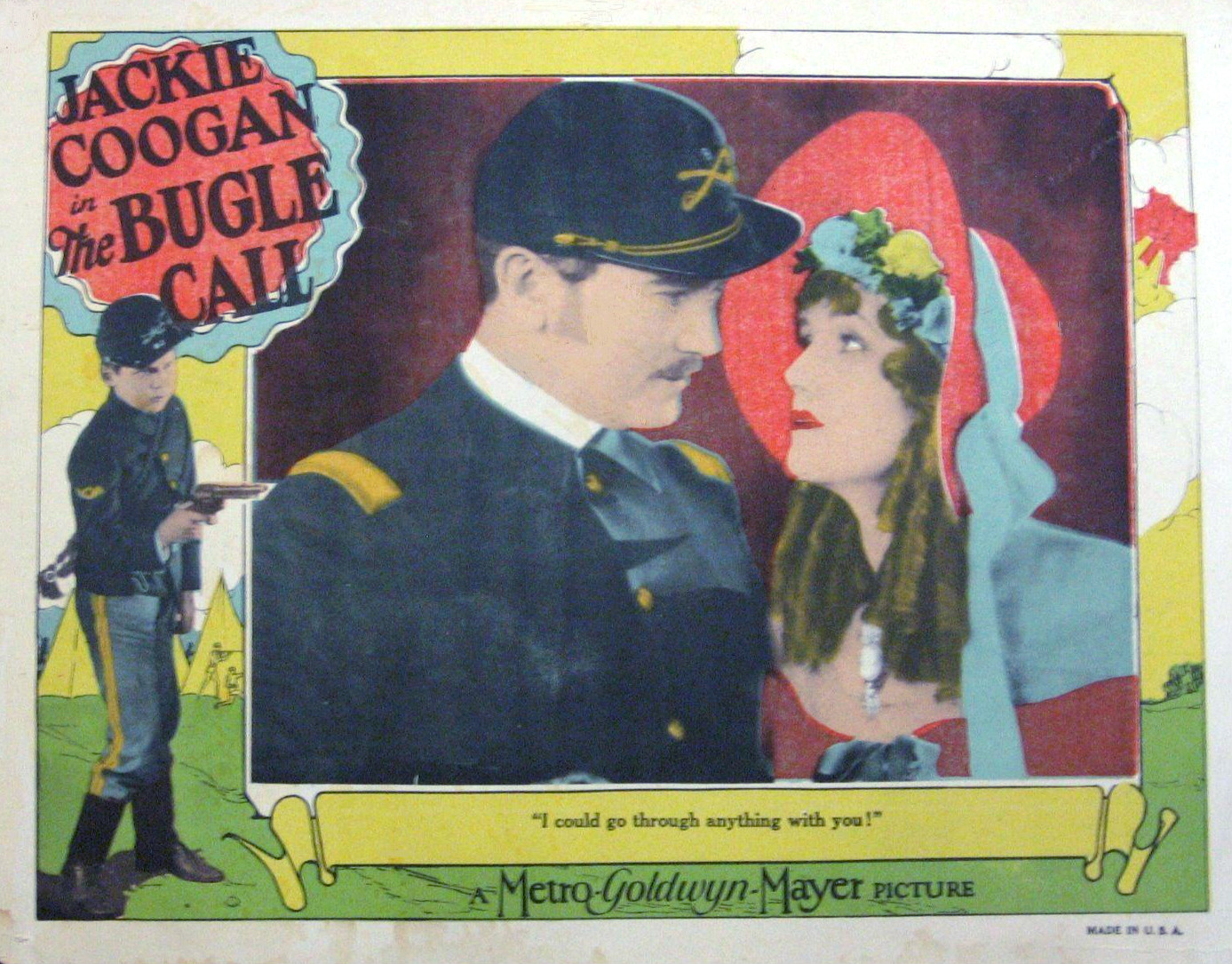
- Lobby card
- Directed by: Edward Sedgwick
- Screenplay by: Josephine Lovett; Fanny Hatton (titles); Frederic Hatton (titles)
- Story by: C. Gardner Sullivan
- Starring: Jackie Coogan; Claire Windsor
- Cinematography: André Barlatier – (French Wikipedia)
- Edited by: Sam Zimbalist
- Distributed by: Metro-Goldwyn-Mayer
- Release date: August 6, 1927
- Running time: 6 reels
- Country: United States
- Language: Silent (English intertitles)

The Bugle Call is a 1927 American silent drama film directed by Edward Sedgwick and starring Jackie Coogan and Claire Windsor, which was released on August 6, 1927.

The Lost Film Files database lists this film as being lost.

== Plot ==
Billy Randalph who is a young bugler on a frontier cavalry post in the mid-1870s, whose stepmother Alice Tremayne attempts to replace his real mother who only lives in his memory.

== Cast ==
- Jackie Coogan as Billy Randolph
- Claire Windsor as Alice Tremayne
- Herbert Rawlinson as Capt. Randolph
- Tom O'Brien as Sgt. Doolan
- Harry Todd as Cpl. Jansen
- Nelson McDowell as Luke
- Sarah Padden as Luke's Wife
- Johnny Mack Brown Bit (uncredited)

== Crew ==
- Cedric Gibbons – Art Director
- David Townsend – Set Design
- André-ani – Costume Design
