= Swing skirt =

Knee-length skirt style

A swing skirt is a vintage knee-length retro skirt typical of the 1960s, but first introduced in the 1930s.

This circular skirt tended to swing when the wearer was in motion, movement induced by the use of numerous pleats or tucks.

== Bibliography ==
- Bradley, Carolyn G. (2001). Western World Costume: An Outline History. Mineola, N.Y.: Dover Publications. ISBN 9780486419862.
- Lewandowski, Elizabeth J. (2011). The Complete Costume Dictionary. Lanham, Md.: Scarecrow Press. ISBN 9780810877856.
- Picken, Mary Brooks (1999). A Dictionary of Costume and Fashion: Historic and Modern. Mineola, N.Y.: Dover Press. ISBN 9780486402949.
- Stroup, Ann Helen (1967). An Investigation of the Dress of American Children From 1930 Through 1941 With Emphasis on Factors Influencing Change (Master's). Cornell University.
