= André-ani =

American costume designer

- Born: Clément Henri Andreani; April 22, 1901; Oakland, California
- Died: April 3, 1953 (aged 51); Oakland, California
- Occupation: Costume designer
- Notable credits: The Great Gabbo; Bardelys the Magnificent
- Parents: Massimo Andreani (father); Angiolina Reali (mother)

André-ani (born Clément Henri Andreani; April 22, 1901 – April 3, 1953) was an American costume designer.

== Biography ==
Clément Henri Andreani was the son of Italian immigrants Massimo Andreani and Angiolina Reali, who arrived in the United States in 1888. Orphaned at an early age and suffering from a spinal deformity, he was cared for by his aunt Quinta. Friends, noting his artistic abilities, helped him to take art classes in San Francisco.

At age 16 he began working for the Selectasine Serigraphics Company in San Francisco. He later made use of the screen printing skills he obtained there, printing designs directly onto fabric for costumes.

By the early 1920s, André-ani was teaching at the School of Costume Designing in Los Angeles. Hollywood socialite Peggy Hamilton helped promote his work in her newspaper columns and fashion shows.

In 1925 he was hired by MGM, taking the place of head designer Erté in dressing stars such as Joan Crawford and Greta Garbo. He went to work for Universal Pictures in 1928.

== Filmography ==
- 1925: Soul Mates
- 1925: His Secretary
- 1925: The Mystic
- 1925: If Marriage Fails
- 1926: Flesh and the Devil
- 1926: The Fire Brigade
- 1926: Exit Smiling
- 1926: The Temptress
- 1926: The Devil's Circus
- 1926: Torrent
- 1926: The Blackbird
- 1926: Valencia
- 1926: Tin Hats
- 1926: The Flaming Forest
- 1926: Upstage
- 1926: Love's Blindness
- 1926: War Paint
- 1926: Bardelys the Magnificent
- 1926: Blarney
- 1926: The Gay Deceiver
- 1926: The Waning Sex
- 1926: The Boy Friend
- 1926: Paris
- 1926: Money Talks
- 1926: Beverly of Graustark
- 1926: The Exquisite Sinner
- 1926: The Barrier
- 1926: Monte Carlo
- 1926: Dance Madness
- 1927: Captain Salvation
- 1927: The Red Mill
- 1927: Becky
- 1927: The Bugle Call
- 1927: The Frontiersman
- 1927: Tillie the Toiler
- 1927: Annie Laurie
- 1927: California
- 1927: Rookies
- 1927: Lovers
- 1927: Slide, Kelly, Slide
- 1927: Heaven on Earth
- 1927: The Understanding Heart
- 1927: The Demi-Bride
- 1927: Women Love Diamonds
- 1927: Altars of Desire
- 1927: The Taxi Dancer
- 1927: A Little Journey
- 1928: The Crowd
- 1928: The Wind
- 1929: The Great Gabbo
- 1930: The Boudoir Diplomat
- 1930: The Cat Creeps
- 1932: Money Talks
- 1935: Vagabond Lady
