= Isabelle Andréani =

French mezzo-soprano and voice teacher (1923–2018)

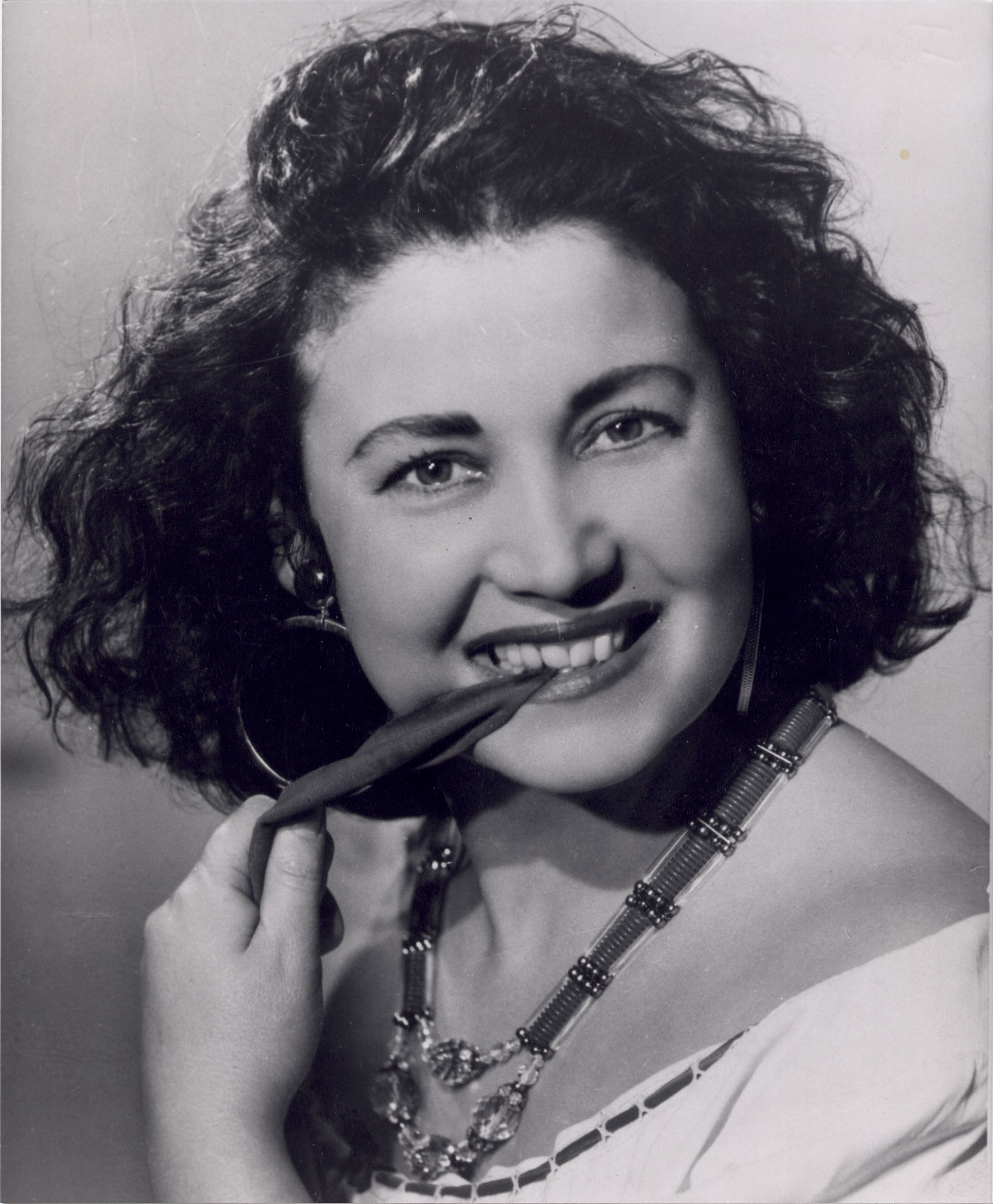
- Isabelle Andréani as Carmen in 1953
- Born: 18 February 1923; Sari-de-Porto-Vecchio, Corsica, France
- Died: 3 June 2018 (aged 95); Toulon, France
- Education: Musikhochschule Stuttgart
- Occupations: Operatic soprano; Academic lecturer
- Organizations: Opéra de Marseille; Opera de Paris; Conservatoire de Toulon

Isabelle Andréani (18 February 1923 – 3 June 2018) was a French operatic mezzo-soprano and voice teacher. She was a member of the Paris Opera troupe from the mid-1950s, appearing in the title role of Bizet's Carmen in 1960, which became her signature role, also for international performances. She was a voice teacher in Aix-en-Provence from 1965, and at the Conservatoire de Toulon from 1972.

== Life ==
Born in Sari-de-Porto-Vecchio in the south of Corsica in 1923, Andréani was unanimously accepted at the entrance exam of the Marseille Conservatoire in Jeanne Fourestier's class, where she was trained by Fourestier and Mireille Sabatier.

She was engaged in September 1949 at the Opéra de Marseille by its director Michel Leduc, where she made her stage debut as Madeleine in Verdi's Rigoletto (sung in French), and as Malika in Lakmé by Léo Delibes, in both cases alongside Mado Robin. She sang regularly there, notably in the title role of Mignon by Ambroise Thomas, Charlotte in Massenet's Werther, Marina in Mussorgsky's Boris Godunov, and then soon the title role of Bizet's Carmen, her most notable role.

Mado Robin invited her to present herself to the troupe of the Opera de Paris. After an audition, she was engaged in 1954, and soon appeared as Fatima in Weber's Oberon, from 1954 to 1956 conducted by André Cluytens and with Nicolai Gedda, Régine Crespin, Suzanne Sarroca and Denise Scharley. She appeared as Carmen from 1955, which she performed regularly in alternation at the salle Favart of the Opéra-Comique, notably with Andréa Guiot as Micaela and José Luccioni as Don José, conducted by Georges Prêtre and Cruchon. In 1962, she appeared as Annina in a production of Der Rosenkavalier by Richard Strauss, alongside Elisabeth Schwarzkopf.

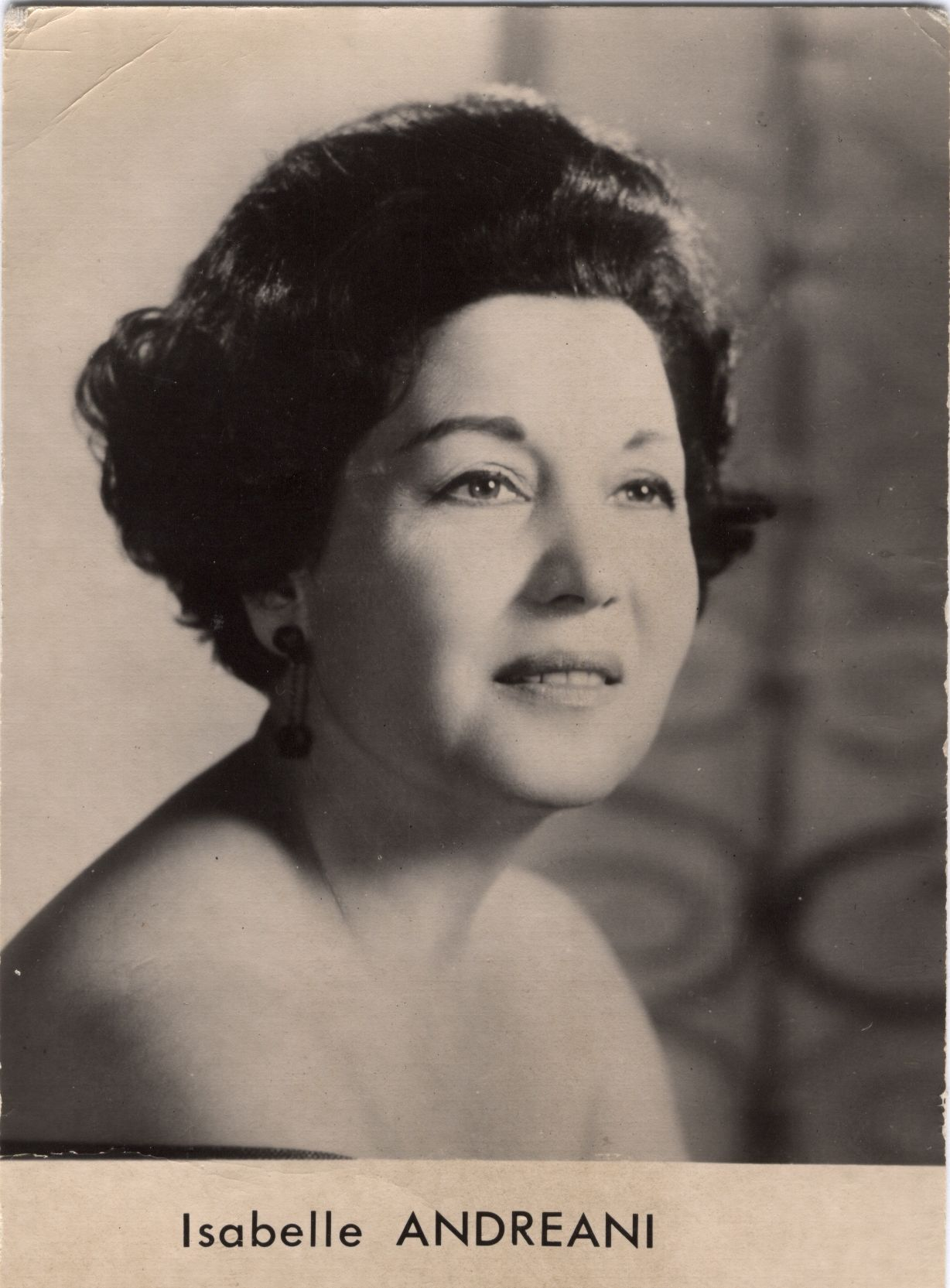
Photo-Carte, 1960

She appeared as Carmen in most of the opera houses in France, and in 1960 at the Paris Opera in a 1959 production conducted by Raymond Rouleau and directed by Roberto Benzi which was performed 367 times in Paris until 1970, and then revived several hundred times in Europe and as far as Japan. She continued her career in a wide repertoire, including Zaïre in Rameau's Les Indes galantes, Zoroastre, Mozart's Così fan tutte, Olga in Tchaikovsky's Eugène Onéguine, Rosina in Rossini's Le Barbier de Séville the Mother in Charpentier's Louise and Mère Marie in Poulenc's Dialogues des Carmelites.

In concert, she was a soloist at the Office de Radiodiffusion Télévision Française, the Concerts Colonne, the Orchestre Lamoureux and the Pasdeloup Orchestra. In 1955, she made several recordings, including one devoted to the Opéra-Comique heroines Charlotte and Mignon conducted by Pierre Cruchon (1908–1973), whom she later married.

She was appointed as a voice teacher at the Conservatoire à rayonnement régional d'Aix-en-Provence in 1965, and at the Conservatoire de Toulon in 1972.

She took part in Toulon in recitals of melodies, and participated at the Toulon Opera in concerts of the Conservatory directed by Lucien Jean-Baptiste, notably Beethoven's Missa solemnis with Anne-Marie Rodde.

She died on 3 June 2018 in Toulon at the age of 95. A first ceremony was held on 6 June 2018 in the Cathedral Notre-Dame-de-la-Seds of Toulon, then in the church of Pino (Corsica) on 7 June, followed by burial in the family vault.

== Recordings ==
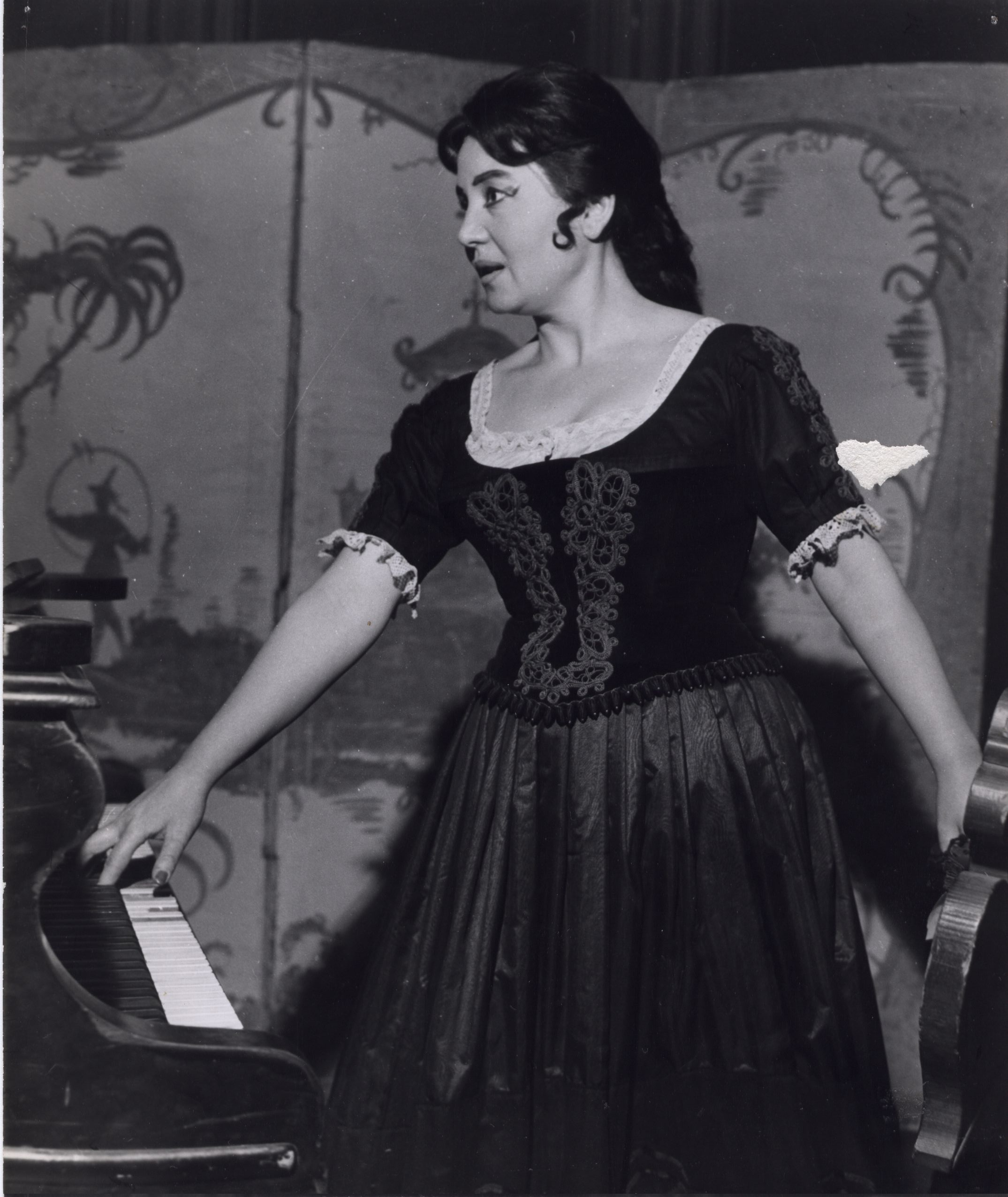
Andréani as Rosina in Rossini's Barbier de Séville in 1962

Recordings by Isabelle Andréani are held by the French National Library, including:

- Du Châtelet à l'opéra: 97 grands moments de l'art lyrique – 8 disques: 33 t, stéréo – Édition: [Paris]: Le Livre de Paris-Hachette, [1977]
- Panorama de l'opérette viennoise – 1 disk, 1963
- Une soirée à l’opéra-comique – 1 disk, 1962
- Panorama de l'opérette viennoise – 5 disks, Paris: Club national du disque, 1961
- Panorama de l'opérette française – 5 disks, Paris: Club national du disque, 1960
- Mignon: Récit et air: "Connais-tu le pays" − 1 disk, 1955
