= Eli M. Oboler =

American librarian

- Born: September 26, 1915; Chicago, Illinois, U.S.
- Died: June 15, 1983 (aged 67); Pocatello, Idaho, U.S.
- Education: University of Chicago (BA); Columbia University (BS)
- Occupation: librarian

Eli Martin Oboler (September 26, 1915 – June 15, 1983) was an American librarian who worked as the longtime librarian at the Idaho State University library, later renamed the Eli M. Oboler Library, from 1949 to 1980. He was also a member of the Idaho Library Association and the Pacific Northwest Library Association, and served as president for both organizations. Oboler was a noted defender of intellectual freedom and an anti-censorship activist.

== Early life and education ==
Oboler was born and raised in Chicago. He held degrees from both the University of Chicago and Columbia University, including a Bachelor of Science degree in Library Science. After his discharge from the army in 1946, Oboler returned to the Chicago where he attended the University of Chicago Graduate Library School.

== Career ==
During World War II Oboler served in the Lend-Lease Expediting Bureau and later in the United States Army. Oboler became head librarian of Idaho State College (now Idaho State University) in 1949. He served in that capacity until his retirement in 1980.

Oboler was a longtime member of the American Library Association, and held numerous positions with the ALA and the Association of College and Research Libraries (ACRL), one of the largest subdivisions of the ALA. Oboler served on the Intellectual Freedom Committees of both the Idaho Library Association and the American Library Association.

Shortly before his death in 1983, Idaho State University renamed its library the Eli M. Oboler Library after its longtime librarian. Every two years since 1986, the American Library Association has awarded the Eli M. Oboler Memorial Award for "the best published work in the area of intellectual freedom."

== Personal life ==
Oboler died at his home in Pocatello, Idaho, in 1983 after suffering from cancer.

== Bibliography ==
Oboler authored over 200 publications. He also contributed regularly to several publications, including Library Journal and the Idaho State Journal in Pocatello.

Oboler authored several books on censorship and intellectual freedom, including:

- The Fear of the Word: Censorship and Sex. Metuchen, NJ: Scarecrow Press, 1974.
- Ideas and the University Library: Essays of an Unorthodox Academic Librarian. Westport, CT: Greenwood Press, 1977.
- Defending Intellectual Freedom: The Library and the Censor. Westport, CT: Greenwood Press, 1980.
- To Free the Mind: Libraries, Technology, and Intellectual Freedom. Littleton, CO: Libraries Unlimited, 1983.

== See also ==
- Eli M. Oboler Library
- Idaho State University
