= Peggy Hamilton =

American fashion and costume designer

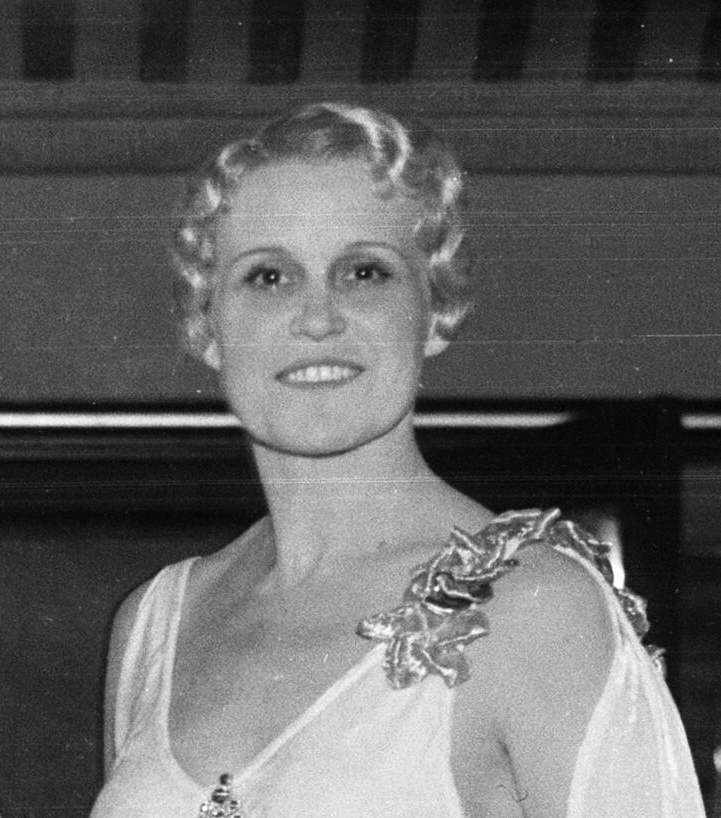
- Hamilton in 1931
- Born: Mae Bedloe Armstrong; 1894; Colorado, U.S.
- Died: February 26, 1984 (aged 89–90); Hollywood, Los Angeles, California, U.S.
- Occupations: Fashion designer, costume designer, fashion editor, radio personality
- Spouse: 6 or 7

Peggy Hamilton (born Mae Bedloe Armstrong; 1894 – February 26, 1984) was an American fashion and costume designer who designed many dresses for Hollywood silent actresses in the 1920s and 1930s. She was also the editor of a fashion column in The Los Angeles Times and a fashion commentator on the radio. She was "one of the first boosters of Los Angeles-made fashions."

== Life ==
Hamilton was born Mae Bedlow Armstrong in 1894 in Colorado. She grew up as a member of high society in Los Angeles from the age of 10. She studied fashion in New York and Buenos Aires.

Hamilton began her career as a designer in New York City in the 1910s, only to move to Los Angeles to work for the Triangle Film Corporation shortly after. She designed many dresses for Hollywood silent actresses in the 1920s and 1930s, including Gloria Swanson, Myrna Loy, Norma Shearer, Dolores del Río, Joan Crawford, Bette Davis, and Greta Garbo. She designed a dress whose pattern matched the ceiling of the ballroom inside the Biltmore Hotel painted by muralist John B. Smeraldi for its dedication in 1923.

Hamilton was the editor of the fashion column in The Los Angeles Times from 1921 to 1934. She was also a radio commentator on fashion from 1929 to 1933. She was the hostess of the 1932 Summer Olympics in Los Angeles, and she became "one of the first boosters of Los Angeles-made fashions."

Hamilton was married six or seven times, including John Quincy Adams IV, a descendant of President John Quincy Adams. She resided in Hollywood, where she died of cancer on February 26, 1984, at age 90.
