= List of Metro-Goldwyn-Mayer films (1924–1929) =

The following is a list of films originally produced and/or distributed theatrically by Metro-Goldwyn-Mayer and released between 1924 and 1929.

== Key ==
#	Considered to be lost.

== 1924 ==
Release date	Title	Notes
April 14, 1924	Mademoiselle Midnight	Distribution only; produced by Tiffany Productions
April 21, 1924	Sherlock Jr.	Distribution only; produced by Joseph M. Schenck Inducted into the National Film Registry in 1991
June 23, 1924	Revelation	
August 3, 1924	Broken Barriers#	
August 4, 1924	Bread#	
August 11, 1924	Tess of the d'Urbervilles#	
August 25, 1924	Little Robinson Crusoe	
September 1, 1924	Sinners in Silk#	
September 8, 1924	The Red Lily	
September 15, 1924	Yolanda	Distribution only; produced by William Randolph Hearst for the Cosmopolitan Corporation
September 15, 1924	Wine of Youth	
September 29, 1924	His Hour	
September 29, 1924	One Night in Rome	
October 6, 1924	The Beauty Prize#	
October 6, 1924	Circe, the Enchantress	Distribution only; produced by Tiffany Productions
October 13, 1924	The Navigator	Distribution only; presented by Joseph M. Schenck Inducted into the National Film Registry in 2018
October 20, 1924	The Bandolero#	
October 27, 1924	Married Flirts#	
November 3, 1924	Along Came Ruth#	
November 9, 1924	He Who Gets Slapped	Inducted into the National Film Registry in 2017; The first film made completely by MGM as Slats became its first original MGM lion mascot after Goldwyn Pictures took over 2 unknown lions.
November 19, 1924	The Snob#	
November 24, 1924	The Silent Accuser	
November 24, 1924	So This Is Marriage#	
December 1, 1924	The Wife of the Centaur#	
December 4, 1924	Greed	Incomplete; Inducted into the National Film Registry in 1991
December 6, 1924	Romola	Distribution only; produced by Inspiration Pictures
December 8, 1924	Janice Meredith	Distribution only; produced by William Randolph Hearst
December 29, 1924	The Dixie Handicap#	

== 1925 ==
Release date	Title	Notes
January 19, 1925	Excuse Me#	
February 9, 1925	Cheaper to Marry#	
February 10, 1925	Chu-Chin-Chow#	US distribution only; made in the UK by Graham-Wilcox Productions
February 15, 1925	The Great Divide	
February 16, 1925	The Rag Man	
February 23, 1925	Lady of the Night	
February 23, 1925	The Prairie Wife#	The first sound film with Jackie the Lion as the MGM mascot. Distribution only; produced by Eastern Productions
March 11, 1925	Seven Chances	Distribution only; produced by Buster Keaton Productions, presented by Joseph M. Schenck
March 16, 1925	The Monster	
March 22, 1925	The Denial	Incomplete
March 29, 1925	Daddy's Gone A-Hunting	
March 29, 1925	The Way of a Girl	
March 30, 1925	Confessions of a Queen	Incomplete
April 13, 1925	The Sporting Venus	
April 20, 1925	Man and Maid#	
April 27, 1925	Proud Flesh	
May 2, 1925	Zander the Great	Distribution only; produced by William Randolph Hearst for the Cosmopolitan Corporation
May 4, 1925	The White Desert	
August 16, 1925	The Unholy Three	remade in 1930
August 26, 1925	The Merry Widow	remade in 1934
September 6, 1925	Pretty Ladies	Incomplete; technicolor sequences missing
September 13, 1925	Never the Twain Shall Meet#	Distribution only; produced by William Randolph Hearst for Cosmopolitan
September 20, 1925	Sun-Up	
September 22, 1925	The Circle	
September 23, 1925	A Slave of Fashion#	
September 27, 1925	The Mystic	
October 4, 1925	Exchange of Wives	
October 4, 1925	The Midshipman	Produced under the supervision of the U. S. Navy Department
October 11, 1925	The Tower of Lies#	
November 1, 1925	Go West	Distribution only; produced by Buster Keaton Productions
November 5, 1925	The Big Parade	Inducted into the National Film Registry in 1992
November 8, 1925	Lights of Old Broadway	A Cosmopolitan production
November 8, 1925	Time, the Comedian	
November 9, 1925	Old Clothes	
November 15, 1925	Bright Lights#	
November 15, 1925	Don't#	
November 22, 1925	The Only Thing	
December 6, 1925	His Secretary#	
December 13, 1925	The Masked Bride#	
December 20, 1925	Soul Mates	
December 27, 1925	The Great Love#	
December 27, 1925	Sally, Irene and Mary	
December 30, 1925	Ben-Hur	partial Technicolor; remade in 1959 and 2016 Inducted into the National Film Registry in 1997

== 1926 ==
Release date	Title	Notes
January 4, 1926	Dance Madness#	
January 11, 1926	The Blackbird	
January 11, 1926	Mike	Incomplete; missing reels 3 & 4
February 1, 1926	The Auction Block#	
February 15, 1926	The Devil's Circus	
February 15, 1926	Mare Nostrum	
February 21, 1926	Torrent	A Cosmopolitan production
February 24, 1926	La Bohème	
March 1, 1926	Monte Carlo	
March 28, 1926	The Exquisite Sinner	Unclear
April 19, 1926	Beverly of Graustark	A Cosmopolitan production
May 2, 1926	Brown of Harvard	
May 10, 1926	Money Talks	Incomplete
May 17, 1926	The Boob	
May 21, 1926	The Barrier#	
May 24, 1926	Paris	
June 26, 1926	Lovey Mary	Incomplete; missing 1 reel
June 28, 1926	The Road to Mandalay	Incomplete
July 25, 1926	A Waltz Dream	US distribution; made in Germany by UFA
August 9, 1926	The Scarlet Letter	
August 14, 1926	The Boy Friend#	
September 4, 1926	Battling Butler	A Buster Keaton production
September 5, 1926	The Waning Sex	
September 26, 1926	Blarney#	
September 30, 1926	Bardelys the Magnificent	Incomplete
October 10, 1926	The Temptress	A Cosmopolitan production
October 10, 1926	War Paint#	Trailer Survives
October 17, 1926	The Gay Deceiver#	
October 24, 1926	The Magician	
November 7, 1926	Upstage	
November 14, 1926	The Desert's Toll	
November 14, 1926	Exit Smiling	
November 21, 1926	The Flaming Forest	A Cosmopolitan production
November 28, 1926	There You Are!#	
November 28, 1926	Tin Hats	incomplete; missing 1 reel
December 4, 1926	Love's Blindness#	fragment
December 5, 1926	Faust	US distribution; made in Germany by UFA
December 18, 1926	Valencia	
December 20, 1926	The Fire Brigade	
December 23, 1926	Tell It to the Marines	

== 1927 ==
Release date	Title	Notes
January 1, 1927	A Little Journey#	
January 9, 1927	Flesh and the Devil	Inducted into the National Film Registry in 2006
January 15, 1927	Johnny Get Your Hair Cut	
January 22, 1927	The Show	
January 27, 1927	Winners of the Wilderness	
January 29, 1927	The Red Mill	A Cosmopolitan production
February 5, 1927	Altars of Desire	
February 5, 1927	The Taxi Dancer	
February 12, 1927	Women Love Diamonds	
February 19, 1927	The Demi-Bride	Incomplete
February 19, 1927	The Valley of Hell	Incomplete; 2 reels only
February 26, 1927	The Understanding Heart	A Cosmopolitan production
March 12, 1927	Slide, Kelly, Slide	
March 15, 1927	Heaven on Earth	
March 26, 1927	Mr. Wu	
April 2, 1927	Frisco Sally Levy#	
April 30, 1927	Rookies	
May 1, 1927	Lovers?#	
May 7, 1927	California	
May 11, 1927	Annie Laurie	
May 14, 1927	Captain Salvation	
May 21, 1927	Tillie the Toiler	A Cosmopolitan production
June 4, 1927	The Unknown	
June 11, 1927	The Frontiersman#	
June 18, 1927	The Callahans and the Murphys#	fragment
June 25, 1927	On Ze Boulevard	
July 9, 1927	Twelve Miles Out	
August 6, 1927	The Bugle Call#	
August 13, 1927	Mockery	
August 20, 1927	After Midnight	
August 27, 1927	Adam and Evil#	
September 2, 1927	The Garden of Allah	
September 3, 1927	Foreign Devils	
September 21, 1927	The Student Prince in Old Heidelberg	
October 1, 1927	Body and Soul	
October 1, 1927	The Fair Co-Ed	A Marion Davies production
October 9, 1927	The Road to Romance	
October 13, 1927	The Thirteenth Hour	
October 22, 1927	Spring Fever	
October 29, 1927	Tea for Three#	
November 1, 1927	Quality Street	
November 12, 1927	Becky#	A Cosmopolitan production
November 19, 1927	Man, Woman and Sin	
November 20, 1927	In Old Kentucky	
November 26, 1927	Buffalo Bill's Last Fight	Synchronized sound film (1928 re-release); Perhaps the first film to feature Numa, nicknamed Bill after this movie, as the Technicolor version of the Leo the Lion mascot in the MGM logo
November 27, 1927	Love	Synchronized sound film (1928 re-release)
December 3, 1927	London After Midnight#	
December 8, 1927	The Enemy	
December 10, 1927	Spoilers of the West	
December 17, 1927	The Lovelorn	A Cosmopolitan production
December 24, 1927	Buttons#	

== 1928 ==
Release date	Title	Notes
January 8, 1928	Baby Mine#	
January 8, 1928	West Point	Produced by permission of the War Department with cooperation of the U. S. Military Academy
January 14, 1928	The Divine Woman#	Incomplete; one reel and two fragments survive
January 21, 1928	The Law of the Range	
January 28, 1928	Wickedness Preferred#	
February 4, 1928	The Latest from Paris	Incomplete; missing reel 4
February 11, 1928	Rose-Marie#	
February 18, 1928	The Crowd	Inducted into the National Film Registry in 1989
March 4, 1928	The Smart Set	
March 17, 1928	Bringing Up Father	
March 20, 1928	The Trail of '98	Synchronized sound film
March 24, 1928	The Big City	
March 24, 1928	Under the Black Eagle	
March 24, 1928	Wyoming#	
March 31, 1928	Circus Rookies#	
April 7, 1928	Across to Singapore	Incomplete
April 14, 1928	Laugh, Clown, Laugh	Synchronized sound film
April 21, 1928	Riders of the Dark	
April 22, 1928	The Patsy	
April 28, 1928	The Actress#	
May 5, 1928	Diamond Handcuffs#	
May 19, 1928	A Certain Young Man#	
June 9, 1928	Detectives	
June 16, 1928	Forbidden Hours	
June 23, 1928	The Cossacks	Synchronized sound film
June 30, 1928	Mademoiselle from Armentieres	US distribution; made in the UK by Gaumont British
June 30, 1928	Telling the World	
July 14, 1928	The Adventurer#	
July 26, 1928	Skirts	US distribution; made in the UK by British International Pictures; Incomplete
August 4, 1928	The Mysterious Lady	
August 11, 1928	Four Walls#	
August 15, 1928	Beau Broadway#	
September 1, 1928	Our Dancing Daughters	Synchronized sound film; A Cosmopolitan production
September 2, 1928	The Cardboard Lover	
September 8, 1928	Excess Baggage#	Synchronized sound film
September 15, 1928	Beyond the Sierras	
September 15, 1928	While the City Sleeps	Synchronized sound film
September 22, 1928	The Cameraman	Inducted into the National Film Registry in 2005
September 27, 1928	The Baby Cyclone#	Synchronized sound film
September 27, 1928	The Heart of General Robert E. Lee	Technicolor; one of two films known to feature the lion Numa, nicknamed Bill, as the Leo the Lion mascot
October 26, 1928	Shadows of the Night	
November 2, 1928	The Viking	Synchronized sound film with technicolor; Presented by Herbert T. Kalmus
November 10, 1928	White Shadows in the South Seas	Synchronized sound film
November 15, 1928	Alias Jimmy Valentine	Part-talkie; first MGM feature with talking sequences
November 17, 1928	The Bushranger#	
November 17, 1928	The Masks of the Devil#	Synchronized sound film
November 20, 1928	Show People	Synchronized sound film
November 23, 1928	The Wind	Synchronized sound film; Inducted into the National Film Registry in 1993
November 24, 1928	West of Zanzibar	Synchronized sound film
December 1, 1928	Dream of Love#	Synchronized sound film
December 1, 1928	A Lady of Chance	Synchronized sound film
December 15, 1928	A Woman of Affairs	Synchronized sound film
December 23, 1928	Brotherly Love#	Part-talkie
December 29, 1928	Honeymoon	

== 1929 ==
Release date	Title	Notes
January 5, 1929	Morgan's Last Raid#	
January 12, 1929	A Single Man#	
January 12, 1929	Confession	
January 19, 1929	The Flying Fleet	Synchronized sound film; Produced with the sanction of the U. S. Navy
January 23, 1929	The Bellamy Trial	Part-Talkie; A Hearst News Service production; Incomplete
February 1, 1929	The Broadway Melody	All-Talking sound film; Technicolor sequences; Winner of the Academy Award for Best Picture; the first MGM film to win Best Picture; First full-talking MGM feature; also released in a silent version which was 3,429 feet shorter than the version with dialogue.
February 9, 1929	All at Sea	
February 11, 1929	Napoleon	US distribution; made in France by the Films Abel Gance (a Gaumont-Metro presentation)
February 16, 1929	Casanova/The Loves of Casanova	US distribution; made in France by the Société des Cinéromans
February 23, 1929	Wild Orchids	Synchronized sound film
March 2, 1929	The Overland Telegraph	
March 4, 1929	Spies	US distribution; made in Germany by UFA
March 16, 1929	The Duke Steps Out#	Synchronized sound film
March 23, 1929	The Great Power#	All-Talking sound film
March 23, 1929	Tide of Empire	Synchronized sound film
March 29, 1929	Desert Nights	Synchronized sound film
March 30, 1929	The Bridge of San Luis Rey	Part-Talkie
April 6, 1929	Spite Marriage	Synchronized sound film
April 13, 1929	The Voice of the City	All-Talking sound film; A Cosmopolitan production
April 20, 1929	Sioux Blood	
April 27, 1929	The Pagan	Synchronized sound film
May 4, 1929	Where East is East	Synchronized sound film
May 11, 1929	The Desert Rider	
May 25, 1929	A Man's Man#	Synchronized sound film
May 28, 1929	China Bound	
June 8, 1929	The Trial of Mary Dugan	All-Talking sound film
June 15, 1929	The Idle Rich	All-Talking sound film
July 8, 1929	Thunder	Synchronized sound film; Incomplete
July 13, 1929	Wonder of Women#	Part-Talkie
July 26, 1929	The Last of Mrs. Cheyney	All-Talking sound film
July 27, 1929	The Single Standard	Synchronized sound film
August 17, 1929	Madame X	All-Talking sound film
August 20, 1929	Hallelujah	All-Talking sound film; Inducted into the National Film Registry in 2008
August 24, 1929	Marianne	All-Talking sound film; A Marion Davies production
August 24, 1929	Our Modern Maidens	Synchronized sound film
August 31, 1929	The Girl in the Show	All-Talking sound film
September 7, 1929	Speedway	Synchronized sound film
September 14, 1929	The Unholy Night	All-Talking sound film
September 21, 1929	Wise Girls	All-Talking sound film
September 28, 1929	His Glorious Night	All-Talking sound film
October 5, 1929	The Mysterious Island	Part-Talkie; All Technicolor
October 19, 1929	The Thirteenth Chair	All-Talking sound film
November 8, 1929	So This Is College	All-Talking sound film
November 16, 1929	The Kiss	Synchronized sound film; MGM's last film without audible dialogue; From this point onward, all released MGM films were All-Talking sound films.
November 23, 1929	The Hollywood Revue of 1929	Technicolor sequences; Nominated for Academy Award for Best Picture
November 23, 1929	Untamed	
December 6, 1929	It's a Great Life	Technicolor sequences
December 13, 1929	Dynamite	
December 20, 1929	Navy Blues	
December 27, 1929	Devil-May-Care	Technicolor sequences
December 27, 1929	Their Own Desire	

== See also ==
- Lists of Metro-Goldwyn-Mayer films
