= Buttons (film) =

1927 film

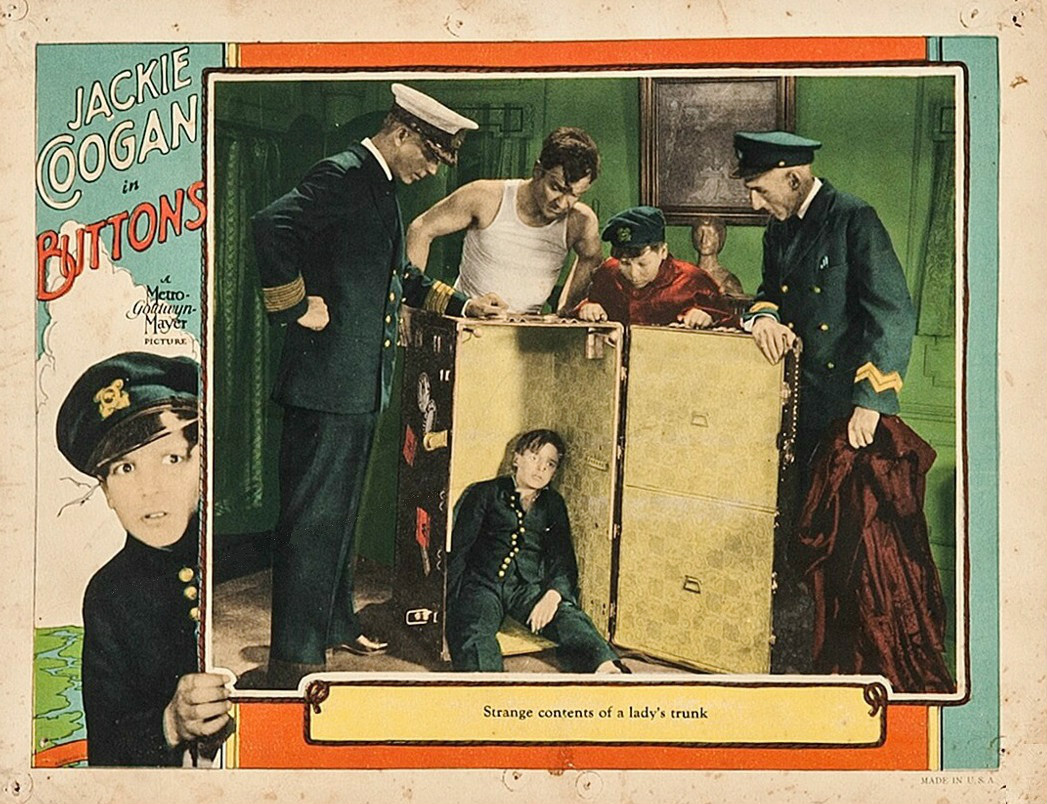
- Lobby card
- Directed by: George W. Hill
- Screenplay by: Marian Constance Blackton; Ralph Spence; Hayden Talbot
- Story by: George W. Hill
- Starring: Jackie Coogan; Lars Hanson; Gertrude Olmstead; Paul Hurst; Roy D'Arcy
- Cinematography: Ira H. Morgan
- Edited by: Sam Zimbalist
- Production company: Metro-Goldwyn-Mayer
- Distributed by: Metro-Goldwyn-Mayer
- Release date: December 24, 1927
- Running time: 70 minutes
- Country: United States
- Language: Silent (English intertitles)

Buttons is a 1927 American silent drama film directed by George W. Hill and written by Marian Constance Blackton, Ralph Spence, and Hayden Talbot. The film stars Jackie Coogan, Lars Hanson, Gertrude Olmstead, Paul Hurst, and Roy D'Arcy. The film was released on December 24, 1927, by Metro-Goldwyn-Mayer.

It is one of the few Jackie Coogan films to be considered a lost film.

== Cast ==
- Jackie Coogan as Buttons
- Lars Hanson as Captain Travers
- Gertrude Olmstead as Ruth Stratton
- Paul Hurst as Slugger McGlue
- Roy D'Arcy as Henri Rizard
- Polly Moran as Polly
- Jack McDonald as Hatchet Face
- Coy Watson, Jr. as Brutus
- Carl Randoll as One of the boys
- Ivan Randoll as One of the boys
- Carl 'Major' Roup as Bellboy (uncredited)
