= Max Fabian =

Max Fabian may refer to:

- Max Fabian (cinematographer), Polish-Jewish cinematographer
- Max Fabian (painter), German-Jewish painter

== See also ==
- Max Fabiani, Slovenian-Italian architect and town planner
