= The Thirteenth Hour =

The Thirteenth Hour may refer to:

- The Thirteenth Hour (1927 film), an American silent film mystery
- The Thirteenth Hour (1947 film), an American mystery film noir
