= On Ze Boulevard =

1927 film

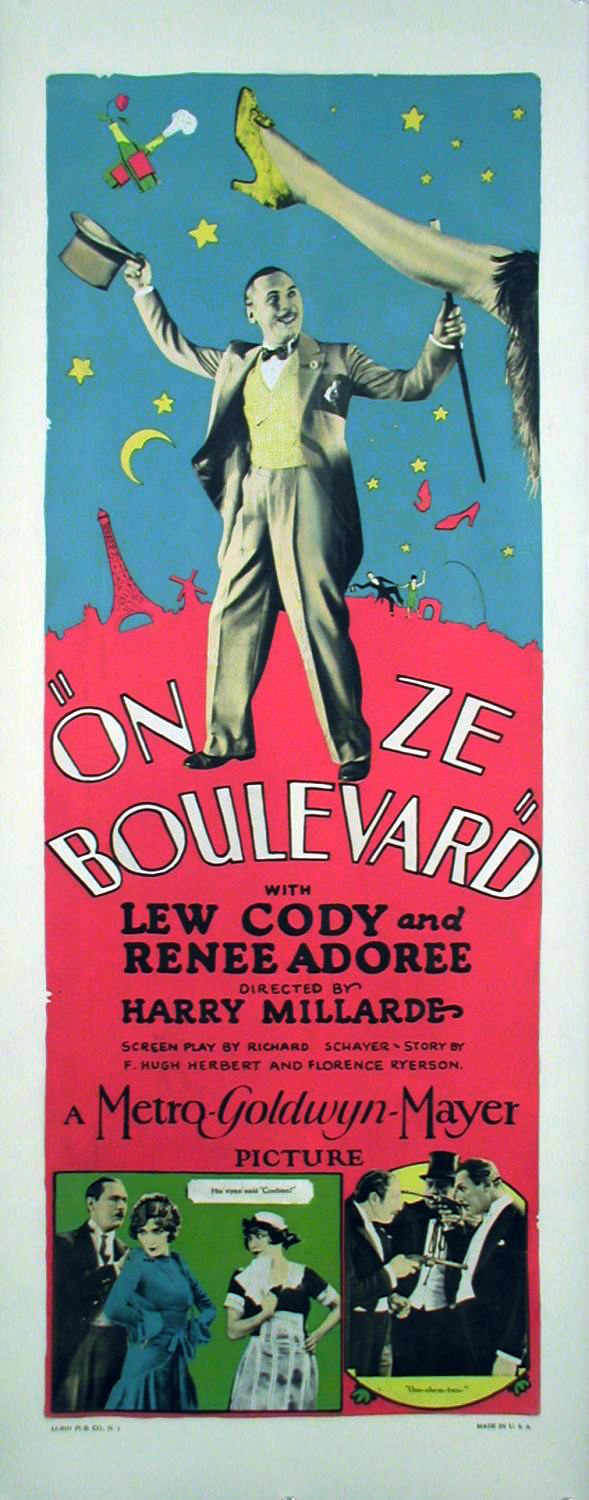
- Theatrical release three-sheet poster
- Directed by: Harry F. Millarde
- Screenplay by: Earl Baldwin; William Scott Darling; Joseph Farnham; Richard Schayer
- Story by: F. Hugh Herbert; Florence Ryerson
- Starring: Lew Cody; Renée Adorée; Anton Vaverka; Dorothy Sebastian; Roy D'Arcy
- Cinematography: André Barlatier; William H. Daniels
- Edited by: George Hively
- Production company: Metro-Goldwyn-Mayer
- Distributed by: Metro-Goldwyn-Mayer
- Release date: June 25, 1927
- Running time: 60 minutes
- Country: United States
- Language: English

On Ze Boulevard is a 1927 American comedy silent film directed by Harry F. Millarde and written by Earl Baldwin, William Scott Darling, Joseph Farnham and Richard Schayer. The film stars Lew Cody, Renée Adorée, Anton Vaverka, Dorothy Sebastian and Roy D'Arcy. The film was released on June 25, 1927, by Metro-Goldwyn-Mayer. A print of this film exists.

== Cast ==
- Lew Cody as Gaston Pasqual
- Renée Adorée as Musette
- Anton Vaverka as Ribot
- Dorothy Sebastian as Gaby de Sylva
- Roy D'Arcy as Counnt de Guissac
