= Douglas Furber =

British lyricist and playwright (1885–1961)

Douglas Furber (13 May 1885 – 20 February 1961) was a British lyricist and playwright.

Furber is best known for the lyrics to the 1937 song "The Lambeth Walk" and the libretto to the musical Me and My Girl, composed by Noel Gay, from which it came. This show made broadcasting history when in 1939 it became the first full-length musical to be broadcast on television. A 1986 revival went on to achieve great acclaim, and was nominated for Tony Awards for both Best Score and Best Book.

Furber made his first entry into songwriting with the Australian-born composer A. Emmett Adams. Following a visit to St. Mary's Church, Southampton, England in 1914, the two wrote "The Bells of St. Mary's". The song was published in 1917. This became a major hit in the United States despite having been originally rejected by the publishers. In 1945, Bing Crosby had a hit with "The Bells of St. Mary's" after it was used as the title song to the film of the same name.

Other hits included "Limehouse Blues" from 1924, written with composer Philip Braham.

Furber also made a few appearances on stage.

== Plays ==
- Afgar, 1919 at the London Pavilion, West End
- Mr. Whittington, 1934 at the London Hippodrome, West End
- Running Riot, 1938–1939 at the Gaiety Theatre, Aldwych London

== Selected filmography ==
- Lovers (1927)
- The Thirteenth Hour (1927)
- The Lucky Number (1932)
- Happy Ever After (1932)
- Soldiers of the King (1933)
- Queen of Hearts (1936)
- When Knights Were Bold (1936)
- Oh Boy! (1938)
- The Sky's the Limit (1938)
- So This Is London (1939)
