= Hugh Wynn =

American film editor

- Born: September 22, 1897; Pasadena, California, United States
- Died: January 8, 1936 (aged 38); Culver City, California, United States
- Occupation: Editor
- Years active: 1924–1935 (film)

Hugh Wynn (1897–1936) was an American film editor. He was employed by the Hollywood studio MGM from 1924 until his sudden death in 1936.

== Filmography ==
- The Wife of the Centaur (1924)
- He Who Gets Slapped (1924)
- Confessions of a Queen (1925)
- The Big Parade (1925)
- The Scarlet Letter (1926)
- Valencia (1926)
- La Bohème (1926)
- The Callahans and the Murphys (1927)
- Women Love Diamonds (1927)
- Love (1927)
- The Patsy (1928)
- Show People (1928)
- The Crowd (1928)
- The Cameraman (1928)
- Navy Blues (1929)
- Hallelujah (1929)
- Romance (1930)
- Paid (1930)
- The Divorcee (1930)
- Anna Christie (1930)
- Billy the Kid (1930)
- Strangers May Kiss (1931)
- A Free Soul (1931)
- The Champ (1931)
- Huddle (1932)
- Faithless (1932)
- Fast Life (1932)
- Arsène Lupin (1932)
- Another Language (1933)
- Clear All Wires! (1933)
- Should Ladies Behave (1933)
- Christopher Bean (1933)
- When Ladies Meet (1933)
- Looking forward (1933)
- Stamboul Quest (1934)
- The Painted Veil (1934)
- The Mystery of Mr. X (1934)
- Sadie McKee (1934)
- Kind Lady (1935)
- The Winning Ticket (1935)
- Age of Indiscretion (1935)
- Mad Love (1935)
- Times Square Lady (1935)
- Rendezvous (1935)

== Bibliography ==
- Beauchamp, Cari. Without Lying Down: Frances Marion and the Powerful Women of Early Hollywood. University of California Press, 1998.
- Clark, Mark. Smirk, Sneer and Scream: Great Acting in Horror Cinema. McFarland, 2003.
- Neibaur, James L. The Fall of Buster Keaton: His Films for MGM, Educational Pictures, and Columbia. Scarecrow Press, 2010.
