= Caught Short =

1930 film

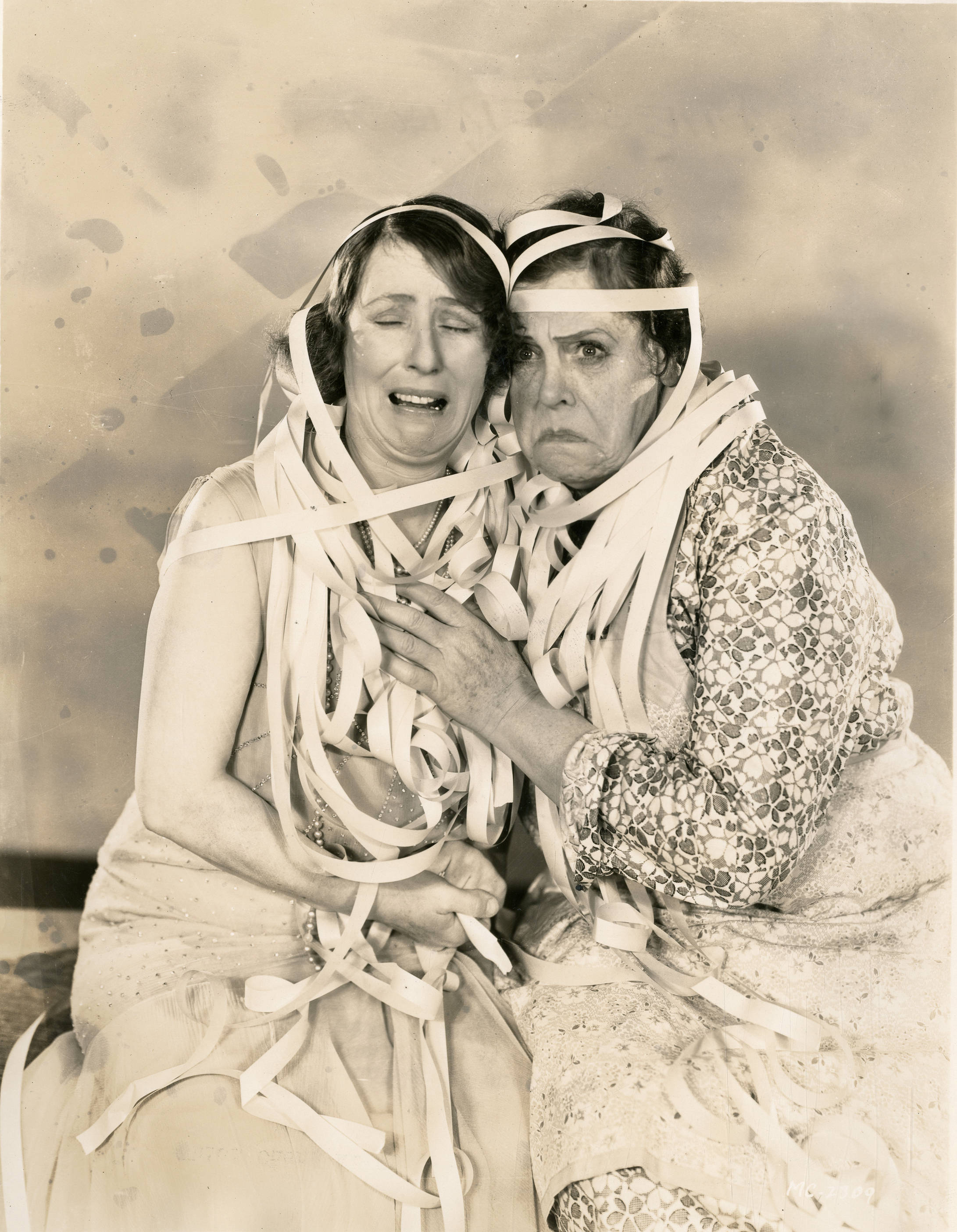
- Film still
- Directed by: Charles Reisner
- Screenplay by: Robert E. Hopkins; Joseph H. Johnson; Willard Mack
- Story by: Willard Mack
- Based on: Caught Short by Eddie Cantor
- Starring: Marie Dressler; Polly Moran; Anita Page; Charles Morton; Thomas Conlin
- Cinematography: Leonard Smith
- Edited by: George Hively; Harold Palmer
- Production company: Cosmopolitan Productions
- Distributed by: Metro-Goldwyn-Mayer
- Release date: May 10, 1930
- Running time: 75 minutes
- Country: United States
- Language: English

Caught Short is a 1930 American pre-Code comedy film directed by Charles Reisner and written by Robert E. Hopkins, Joseph H. Johnson, and Willard Mack. The film stars Marie Dressler, Polly Moran, Anita Page, Charles Morton, and Thomas Conlin. The film was released on May 10, 1930, by Metro-Goldwyn-Mayer.

== Cast ==
- Marie Dressler as Marie Jones
- Polly Moran as Polly Smith
- Anita Page as Genevieve Jones
- Charles Morton as William Smith
- Thomas Conlin as Frankie
- Douglas Haig as Johnny
- Nanci Price as Priscilla
- Greta Mann as Sophy
- Herbert Prior as Mr. Frisby
- T. Roy Barnes as Mr. Kidd
- Edward Dillon as Mr. Thutt
- Alice Moe as Miss Ambrose
- Gwen Lee as Manicurist
- Lee Kohlmar as Peddler
- Greta Granstedt as Fanny Lee
