= Polly Moran =

American actress (1883–1952)

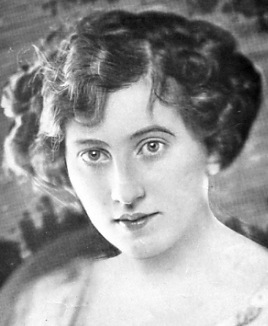
- Born: Pauline Theresa Moran; June 28, 1883; Chicago, Illinois, U.S.
- Died: January 24, 1952 (aged 68); Los Angeles, California, U.S.
- Occupations: Vaudevillian, stage and screen actress
- Years active: 1913–1950
- Spouses: Bob Sandberg (m. 1911; div. 1917) Martin T. Malone (m. 1933)
- Children: 1 son (adopted)

Pauline Theresa Moran (June 28, 1883 – January 24, 1952), known professionally as Polly Moran, was an American actress and comedian. Beginning her career in vaudeville, she acted in Mack Sennett comedies as one of Sennett Bathing Beauties.

== Career ==
Born in Chicago, Illinois, Moran started in vaudeville, and widely toured North America, as well as various other locations that included Europe and South Africa. She left vaudeville in 1914 after signing for Mack Sennett at Keystone Studios as one of his Sennett Bathing Beauties. There she honed the style of the brash, loud-mouthed, knock-about comedian by which she later became known. She proved effective at slapstick and remained with Sennett for several years until she was signed by MGM.

She partnered with Broadway star Marie Dressler in The Callahans and the Murphys (1927); and the two appeared in eight additional films together, such as Chasing Rainbows (1930), Caught Short (1930), and Prosperity (1932). After Dressler's death in 1934, Moran's career declined, and she only starred in low-budget comedies or B-movies. In 1940, Moran retired to her home in Laguna Beach, California, but maintained an active Hollywood social life and was known for practical jokes. She once ran a failed campaign for a Laguna Beach City Council seat on a "Pro Dogs" platform.

She made a brief comeback appearance in the Tracy–Hepburn comedy Adam's Rib in 1949. After playing the role, she said "I worked in the picture two days before I got a look at myself. I never went back."

== Honors ==
Moran has a star on the Hollywood Walk of Fame at 6300 Hollywood Boulevard.

== Personal life ==
After a marriage that ended in divorce in 1917, Moran married attorney and former prizefighter Martin T. Malone in 1933. Malone was abusive; he beat her and threatened to kill her, but she would not leave him. She had one child, a son, who was adopted between her two marriages. She lived at 530 Mountain Road in Laguna Beach, California.

Moran died of cardiovascular disease in 1952. Although a number of biographies give her date of death as being January 25, 1952, her grave marker reads January 24, 1952.

== Partial filmography ==
- Their Social Splash (1915, short) – Polly - the Unruly Guest
- Cactus Nell (1917, *short)
- The Pullman Bride (1917, short) – Sheriff Nell - the Pullman Drunk's Wife
- Skirts (1921)
- Two Weeks with Pay (1921) – Chambermaid
- The Affairs of Anatol (1921) - Orchestra Leader (uncredited)
- Luck (1923) - Dumb Dora - Fight Enthusiast
- The Blackbird (1926) - Flower Lady at Music Hall (uncredited)
- The Scarlet Letter (1926) - Jeering Townswoman (uncredited)
- Twinkletoes (1926) - Minor Role (uncredited)
- Flesh and the Devil (1926) - Family Retainer with Bouquet (uncredited)
- The Show (1927) - Sideshow Spectator (uncredited)
- The Callahans and the Murphys (1927) - Mrs. Murphy
- The Thirteenth Hour (1927) - Polly
- London After Midnight (1927) - Miss Smithson, the New Maid
- The Enemy (1927) - Baruska
- Buttons (1927) - Polly
- The Divine Woman (1928) - Mme. Pigonier
- Rose-Marie (1928) - Lady Jane
- Bringing Up Father (1928) - Maggie Jiggs
- The Trail of '98 (1928) - Lars' Nagging Wife (uncredited)
- Detectives (1928) - Hotel Guest (uncredited)
- Telling the World (1928) - Landlady
- Beyond the Sierras (1928) - Inez
- While the City Sleeps (1928) - Mrs. Minnie McGinnis
- Show People (1928) - The Maid
- Shadows of the Night (1928) - Entertainer
- A Lady of Chance (1928) - Hotel Maid Who Coughs (uncredited)
- Honeymoon (1928) - Polly
- The Five O'Clock Girl (1928)
- China Bound (1929) - Sarah
- The Hollywood Revue of 1929 (1929) - Polly Moran
- Speedway (1929) - Waitress
- The Unholy Night (1929) - Polly - the Maid
- So This Is College (1929) - Polly
- Hot for Paris (1929) - Polly
- Crazy House (1930, a short comedy with Benny Rubin)
- Chasing Rainbows (1930) - Polly
- The Girl Said No (1930) - Polly
- Caught Short (1930) - Polly Smith
- Way Out West (1930) - Pansy
- Those Three French Girls (1930) - Elmer's Wife (uncredited)
- Way for a Sailor (1930) - Polly
- Remote Control (1930) - Polly
- Paid (1930) - Polly (uncredited)
- Reducing (1931) - Polly Rochay
- The Stolen Jools (1931, Short) - Norma Shearer's Maid
- It's a Wise Child (1931) - Bertha
- Politics (1931) - Ivy Higgins
- Guilty Hands (1931) - Aunt Maggie
- The Passionate Plumber (1932) - Albine
- Prosperity (1932) - Lizzie Praskins
- Le plombier amoureux (1932) - Patricia Alden
- Alice in Wonderland (1933) - Dodo Bird
- Hollywood Party (1934) - Henrietta Clemp
- Down to Their Last Yacht (1934) - Nella Fitzgerald
- Two Wise Maids (1937) - Prudence Matthews
- Ladies in Distress (1938) - Lydia Bonney
- Red River Range (1938) - Mrs. Maxwell
- Ambush (1939) - Cora, diner owner
- Tom Brown's School Days (1940) - Sally Harowell
- Meet the Missus (1940) - Widow Ella Jones
- Petticoat Politics (1941) - Widow Jones
- Adam's Rib (1949) - Mrs. McGrath
- The Yellow Cab Man (1950) - Bride's Mother (final film role)
