= The Callahans and the Murphys =

1927 film

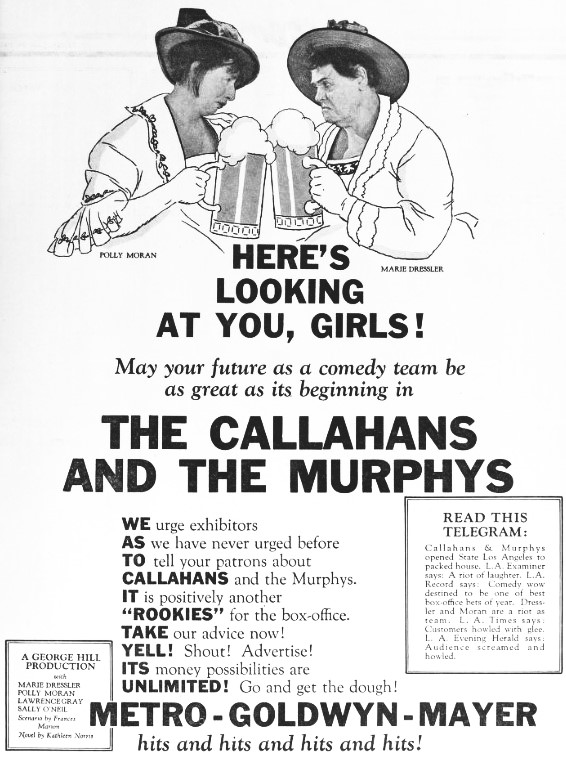
- Advertisement
- Directed by: George W. Hill
- Written by: Frances Marion; Ralph Spence
- Based on: The Callahans and the Murphys by Kathleen Norris
- Produced by: Eddie Mannix
- Starring: Marie Dressler; Polly Moran; Sally O'Neil
- Cinematography: Ira H. Morgan
- Edited by: Hugh Wynn
- Production company: Metro-Goldwyn-Mayer
- Distributed by: Metro-Goldwyn-Mayer
- Release date: June 18, 1927
- Running time: 70 minutes / 66 minutes
- Country: United States
- Language: Silent (English intertitles)

The Callahans and the Murphys is a 1927 American silent comedy film directed by George W. Hill. The film was based on a novel by Kathleen Norris, and was the first of several MGM films to star Marie Dressler and Polly Moran. The film was released on June 18, 1927, but subsequently withdrawn from distribution by MGM after protests were lodged by Irish-American organizations.

== Plot ==
Mrs. Callahan and Mrs. Murphy are a couple of feuding tenement housewives working to keep control of their many children. Dan Murphy falls in love with Ellen Callahan, and then later disappears after Ellen is pregnant. Mrs. Callahan decides to adopt the baby to save her daughters reputation, but finally finds out that Dan and Ellen were secretly married all along.

== Cast ==
- Marie Dressler as Mrs. Callahan
- Polly Moran as Mrs. Murphy
- Sally O'Neil as Ellen Callahan
- Lawrence Gray as Dan Murphy
- Eddie Gribbon as Jim Callahan
- Frank Currier as Grandpa Callahan
- Gertrude Olmstead as Monica Murphy
- Turner Savage as Timmy Callahan
- Jackie Combs as Terrance Callahan
- Anne Shirley as Mary Callahan (credited as Dawn O'Day)
- Monty O'Grady as Michael Callahan
- Tom Lewis as Mr. Murphy

== Production ==
In 1927, screenwriter Frances Marion wanted to create a vehicle for a comeback for her friend Marie Dressler, a vaudevillian who had not made a film since 1918. She found Kathleen Norris's The Callahans and the Murphys, a lighthearted 1922 novel about the fraught relationship between two Irish-American families. The story contained little filmable material so Marion kept the idea of rival Irish matrons and wrote an essentially original story for the screen.

== Reception ==
The preview screening was positive. Initial reviews in The New York Times and Variety regarded the film as a well-made if uninventive example of stage Irish slapstick and sentimentality.

Screenings in cities with large Irish-American communities were soon disrupted by protests against perceived anti-Irish sentiment, especially scenes of women drinking and fighting. Some protests were spontaneous, others orchestrated by organizations like the Ancient Order of Hibernians. A second round of protests alleged anti-Catholic sentiment, including mocking depictions of Saint Patrick's Day, the sign of the cross, and the crucifix. Some saw the film as a Jewish Hollywood attack on Catholicism, others an attack on the Al Smith presidential campaign. Patrick Ford's The Irish World newspaper condemned the film for portraying the Irish as "drunken, vulgar and indecent".

The backlash surprised the studio, in their defence they referred to the Irish heritage of the novelist, producer and actors. Producer Eddie Mannix consulted Irving Thalberg, Will H. Hays and Jason Joy about how to respond. Repeated cuts were made in response to specific complaints. Intertitles were changed, the opener from "Goat Alley is a section where a courteous gentleman always takes off his hat before striking a lady" to "This is the story of the Callahans and the Murphys … both of that fast-fading old school families to whom the world is indebted for the richest and rarest of wholesome fun and humor". Marion suggesting changing the title to The Browns and the Jones. Amid continued protests, the film was withdrawn from circulation.

== Preservation ==
Surviving footage from The Callahans and the Murphys

There are no complete prints of The Callahans and the Murphys located in any film archives. It was until recently considered a lost film.

Two 16 mm rolls with excerpts from the film are known to exist. One is in the National Audio-Visual Conservation Center of the Library of Congress, while the other was discovered in 2024 in the Irish Film Archive, stored under the title An Irish Picnic. Both have been restored and published online, the latter including expository notes for gaps in the narrative. The Library of Congress excerpt (2 minutes 46 seconds) shows a dispute over a borrowed cup of sugar. The Irish Film Archive excerpt (5 minutes 23 seconds) is abridged from the controversial Saint Patrick's Day picnic scene.

== See also ==
- List of lost films

== Sources ==
- Couvares, Francis G. (1992). "Hollywood, Main Street, and the Church: Trying to Censor the Movies Before the Production Code". American Quarterly. 44 (4): 584–616. doi:10.2307/2713216. ISSN 0003-0678. JSTOR 2713216.
- Marion, Frances (1972). Off with their heads: A serio-comic tale of Hollywood. New York: Macmillan. pp. 153–157 – via Internet Archive.
- Walsh, Francis R. (January 1990). "'The Callahans and the Murphys' (MGM, 1927): a case study of Irish-American and Catholic Church censorship". Historical Journal of Film, Radio and Television. 10 (1): 33–45. doi:10.1080/01439689000260021.
- Wilson, Leslie Kreiner (January 2014). "The Education of Frances Marion and Irving Thalberg: Censorship, Development, and Distribution at MGM, 1927–1930". Quarterly Review of Film and Video. 31 (2): 123–135. doi:10.1080/10509208.2011.606411.
