= Florence Ryerson =

American dramatist

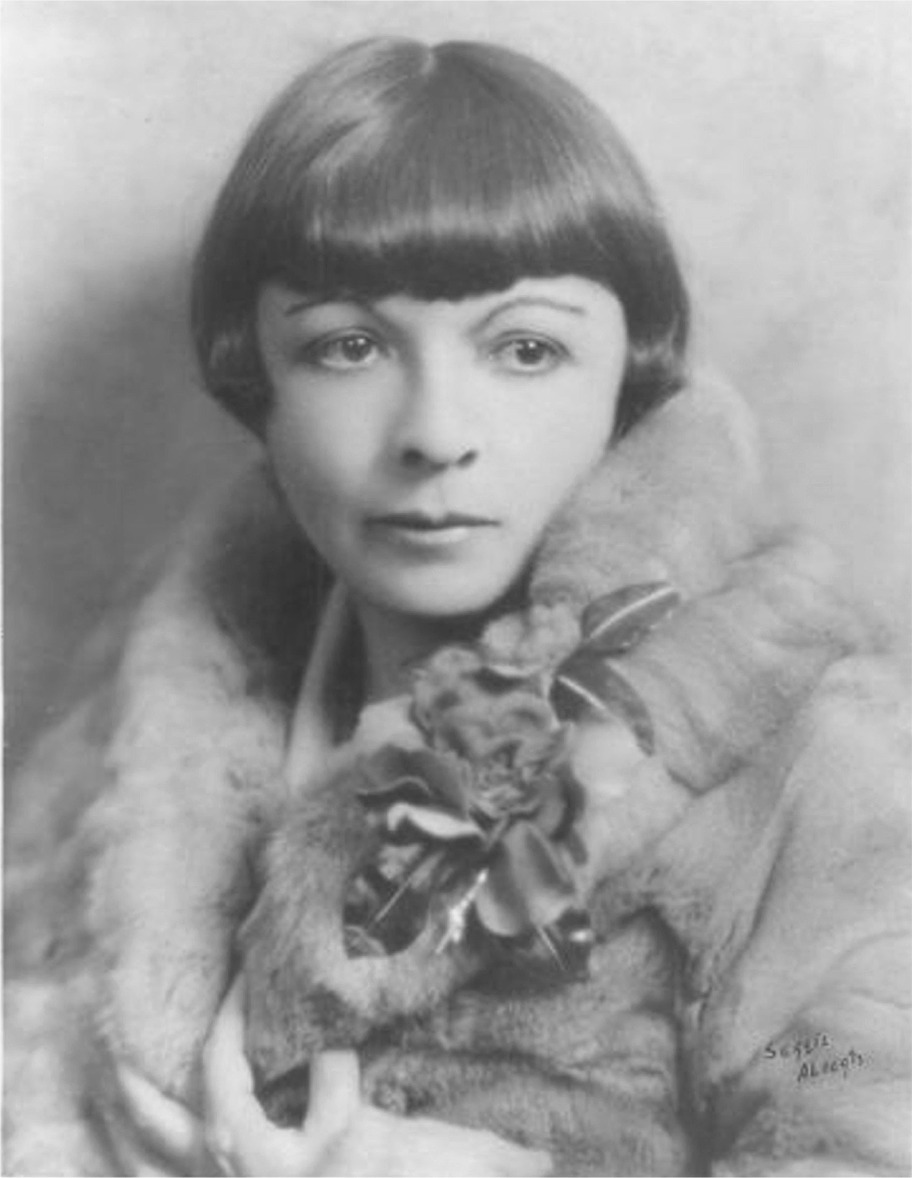
- Born: Florence Willard; September 20, 1892; Glendale, California, U.S.
- Died: June 8, 1965 (aged 72); Mexico City, Mexico
- Other name: Florence Willard
- Education: University of Michigan
- Occupations: screenwriter; playwright; author
- Known for: film scripts
- Spouse(s): Harold Swayne Ryerson (1914–1927, divorced); Colin Campbell Clements (1927–1948, his death)
- Children: Harold Swayne Ryerson Jr.

Florence Ryerson (September 20, 1892 – June 8, 1965) was an American playwright, screenwriter and co-author of the script for the 1939 film The Wizard of Oz. Between 1915 and 1927 she published more than 30 short stories and then joined Metro-Goldwyn-Mayer in 1926 to work on silent film scripts. In 1930 and 1933 she and her husband wrote two books about teenage girlhood. The books were based on a short story series Ryerson had started in 1925. She continued to write for most of her life, writing plays for Broadway in the 1940s.

== Life and career ==
=== Early years ===
Florence Ryerson was born in Glendale, California. She was the daughter of Charles Dwight Willard and Mary McGregor. Charles Dwight Willard (1860–1914), journalist and political reformer, was an 1883 graduate of the University of Michigan, worked on the Los Angeles Times and Los Angeles Herald, and was author of The Fall of Ulysses – An Elephant Story (1912), The Herald's History of Los Angeles City (1901), and other books. She was educated at Stanford and Radcliffe. In 1920 Ryerson and her first husband, Harold Swayne Ryerson, worked in the manufacture of ladies' clothes. She was also a stage actress. She attended George Pierce Baker’s famous “47 Workshop” at Harvard University, as did her second husband, Colin Campbell Clements.

=== Magazine writer ===
Ryerson published more than 30 short stories in magazines between 1915 and the early 1930s. Her writing appeared in Munsey's Magazine, The American Magazine, Woman's World, Ladies' Home Journal, and numerous other magazines.

=== Screenwriter ===
In 1926, Florence Ryerson joined Metro-Goldwyn-Mayer to work on silent film scripts, among them Adam and Evil and Wickedness Preferred. Later sound films she wrote include the Fu Manchu and Philo Vance series.

She was co-author of the screenplay for The Wizard of Oz, along with frequent collaborator Edgar Allan Woolf and British author Noel Langley. Both Ryerson and Woolf created the Wizard's Kansas counterpart, Professor Marvel.

=== Author ===
With Colin Clements, her second husband, Ryerson wrote two books featuring teenage girlhood: This Awful Age (1930) and Mild Oats (1933), both based on a short story series Ryerson had started in 1925 in Woman’s World magazine. Both books were published by D. Appleton. The couple adapted these stories, first as a play, June Mad (1939), which was then adapted as a film, Her First Beau (1941). Actors from the film performed the story on the Lux Radio Theatre on October 27, 1941. Ryerson wrote other short stories and mystery novels with Clements.

=== Shadow Ranch ===
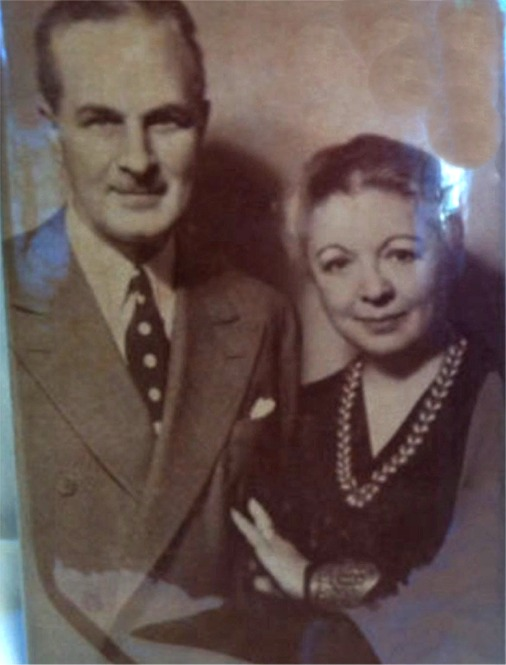
Florence Ryerson and Colin Clements, c. 1948

In the 1930s, Ryerson and Clements acquired the 19th century Workman Ranch in Canoga Park, in the western San Fernando Valley of Los Angeles. She renamed the estate Shadow Ranch for the amount of shade provided by the numerous large blue gum (Eucalyptus globulus) eucalyptus trees, originally planted in the 1860s during the Workman era. They restored and expanded the historic adobe and redwood ranch house, and lived there through the 1940s. Ryerson co-wrote The Wizard of Oz screenplay while living there.

=== Playwright ===
In addition to June Mad, Ryerson and Clements wrote several Broadway plays in the 1940s, including Glamour Preferred, Harriet, and Strange Bedfellows. In Harriet, Helen Hayes portrayed Harriet Beecher Stowe.

=== Later years ===
Colin Clements died in 1948. Ryerson retired to Hampton Falls, New Hampshire, in 1951, where she continued to write plays, some for the local high school.

Florence Ryerson Clements died in Mexico City of cardiac insufficiency in 1965.
