= Roy D'Arcy =

American actor (1894–1969)

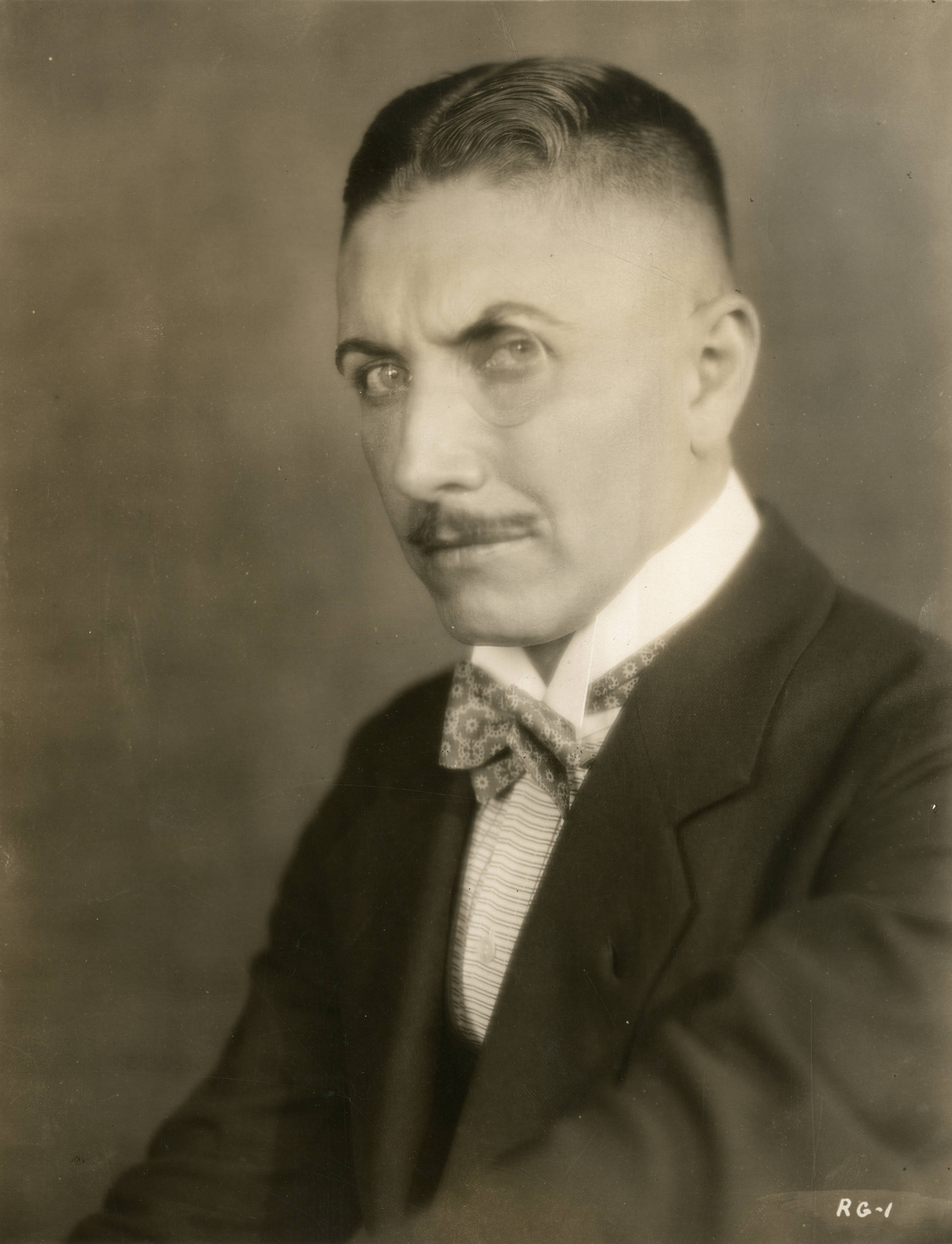
- D'Arcy in 1926
- Born: Roy Francis Giusti; February 10, 1894; San Francisco, California, U.S.
- Died: November 15, 1969 (aged 75); Redlands, California
- Occupation: Actor
- Years active: 1925–1939

Roy D'Arcy (born Roy Francis Giusti; February 10, 1894 – November 15, 1969) was an American film actor of the silent film and early sound period of the 1930s noted for his portrayal of flamboyant villains. He appeared in 50 different films between 1925 and 1939, such as Erich Von Stroheim 's The Merry Widow (1925) and The Temptress (1926) with Greta Garbo.

Finishing his film career around the age of 45, D'Arcy retired to his own real estate business. He died in 1969 and was buried at Montecito Memorial Park in Colton, California.

== Partial filmography ==
- Pretty Ladies (1925) - Paul Thompson
- The Merry Widow (1925) - Crown Prince Mirko
- Graustark (1925) - Dangloss
- The Masked Bride (1925) - Prefect of Police
- La Bohème (1926) - Vicomte Paul
- Monte Carlo (1926) - Prince Boris
- Beverly of Graustark (1926) - General Marlanax
- The Gay Deceiver (1926) - Count de Sano
- Bardelys the Magnificent (1926) - Comte de Chatellerault
- The Temptress (1926) - Manos Duras
- Valencia (1926) - Don Fernando
- Winners of the Wilderness (1927) - Capt. Dumas
- Frisco Sally Levy (1927) - I. Stuart Gold
- Lovers (1927) - Señor Galdos
- On Ze Boulevard (1927) - Counnt de Guissac
- Adam and Evil (1927) - Mortimer Jenkins
- The Road to Romance (1927) - Don Balthasar
- Riders of the Dark (1928) - Eagan
- The Actress (1928) - Gadd
- Forbidden Hours (1928) - Duke Nicky
- Beware of Blondes (1928) - Harry
- Domestic Meddlers (1928) - Lew
- Beyond the Sierras (1928) - Owens
- The Last Warning (1928) - Harvey Carleton
- Girls Gone Wild (1929) - Tony Morelli
- The Woman from Hell (1929) - Slick Glicks
- The Black Watch (1929) - Rewa Ghunga
- Romance (1930) - Minor Role (uncredited)
- The Gay Buckaroo (1931) - Dave Dumont
- Discarded Lovers (1932) - Andre Leighton
- The Shadow of the Eagle (1932, Serial) - Gardner
- File 113 (1932) - De Clameran
- Love Bound (1932) - Juan de Leon
- Broadway to Cheyenne (1932) - Jess Harvey
- Sherlock Holmes (1932) - Manuel Lopez (uncredited)
- The Whispering Shadow (1933) - Professor Alexis Steinbeck
- Flying Down to Rio (1933) - One of the Three Greeks #1
- Orient Express (1934) - Josef Grunlich
- Sing and Like It (1934) - Mr. Gregory - Leading Man in Show
- Kentucky Blue Streak (1935) - Harry Johnson
- Outlawed Guns (1935) - Jack Keeler
- Captain Calamity (1936) - Samson
- Revolt of the Zombies (1936) - Gen. Mazovia
- Captain Calamity (1936) - Samson
- Hollywood Boulevard (1936) - The Sheik
- Under Strange Flags (1937) - Captain Morales
- The Legion of Missing Men (1937) - Shiek Ibrahim-Ul-Ahmed
- The Story of Vernon and Irene Castle (1939) - Actor in 'Patria' (uncredited)
- Chasing Danger (1939) - Corbin (final film role)
