= The Barrier (1926 film) =

1926 American silent adventure film

- French film poster
- Directed by: George W. Hill
- Written by: Harvey Gates
- Based on: The Barrier by Rex Beach
- Starring: Lionel Barrymore; Marceline Day; Henry B. Walthall
- Cinematography: Max Fabian; Ira H. Morgan
- Distributed by: Metro-Goldwyn-Mayer
- Release date: March 21, 1926 (United States)
- Running time: 70 mins.
- Country: United States
- Language: Silent (English intertitles)

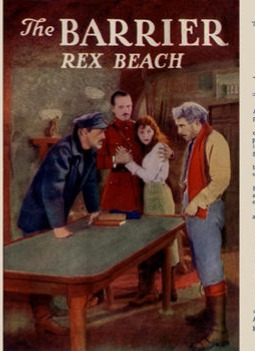
jacket cover of novel with scene from film.

The Barrier is a 1926 American silent adventure film produced and distributed by Metro-Goldwyn-Mayer and directed by George Hill a former cinematographer. The film stars Lionel Barrymore, Henry B. Walthall, Norman Kerry and Marceline Day and is based on the 1908 wilderness novel of the same name by Rex Beach. The film was a breakout role for Day who received praise notices from critics. Previous versions of the novel had been filmed in 1913 and 1917 respectively. This film is the last silent version to be filmed. The Barrier is a lost film.

== Plot ==
As described in a film magazine review, during the Alaskan gold rush days, a baby girl is rescued from Stark Bennett, a brutal father, by kindly seaman Gale Gaylord, when her mother, a full-blooded Indian, dies aboard ship. Necia is brought up unaware of her half-Indian parentage until she is about to wed Meade Burrell, an American Army officer. The discovery causes her to decide to return to her father. After she does so, she is saved from her worthless parent by her lover, whose loyalty finally induces her to marry him.

== Cast ==
- Lionel Barrymore as Stark Bennett
- Marceline Day as Necia
- Norman Kerry as Meade Burrell
- Henry B. Walthall as Gale Gaylord
- George Cooper as Sergeant Murphy
- Bert Woodruff as No Creek Lee
- Neola May as Alluna
- Mario Carillo as Poleon
- Pat Harmon as First Mate
- Shannon Day as Necia's Indian Mother

== Premiere ==
The film’s “world premiere” took place at the West Coast Theatre in San Bernardino, California, on Sunday February 28, 1926, with four showings that day, where it was seen by “thousands.” Subsequent weekday showings were presented twice each evening. A young Ginger Rogers’ vaudeville act was also featured.
