= Beyond the Sierras =

1928 film

- Theatrical release poster
- Directed by: Nick Grinde
- Screenplay by: Robert Lord
- Story by: John T. Neville
- Starring: Tim McCoy; Sylvia Beecher; Roy D'Arcy; Polly Moran; Richard Neill; J. Gordon Russell
- Cinematography: Arthur Reed
- Edited by: William LeVanway
- Production company: Metro-Goldwyn-Mayer
- Distributed by: Metro-Goldwyn-Mayer
- Release date: September 15, 1928
- Running time: 60 minutes
- Country: United States
- Languages: Silent; English intertitles

Beyond the Sierras is a 1928 American silent Western film directed by Nick Grinde and written by Robert Lord. The film stars Tim McCoy, Sylvia Beecher, Roy D'Arcy, Polly Moran, Richard Neill and J. Gordon Russell. The film was released on September 15, 1928, by Metro-Goldwyn-Mayer.

== Cast ==
- Tim McCoy as The Masked Stranger
- Sylvia Beecher as Rosa del Valle
- Roy D'Arcy as Owens
- Polly Moran as Inez
- Richard Neill as Don Carlos del Valle
- J. Gordon Russell as Wells
