= Lovers (1927 film) =

1927 film directed by John M. Stahl

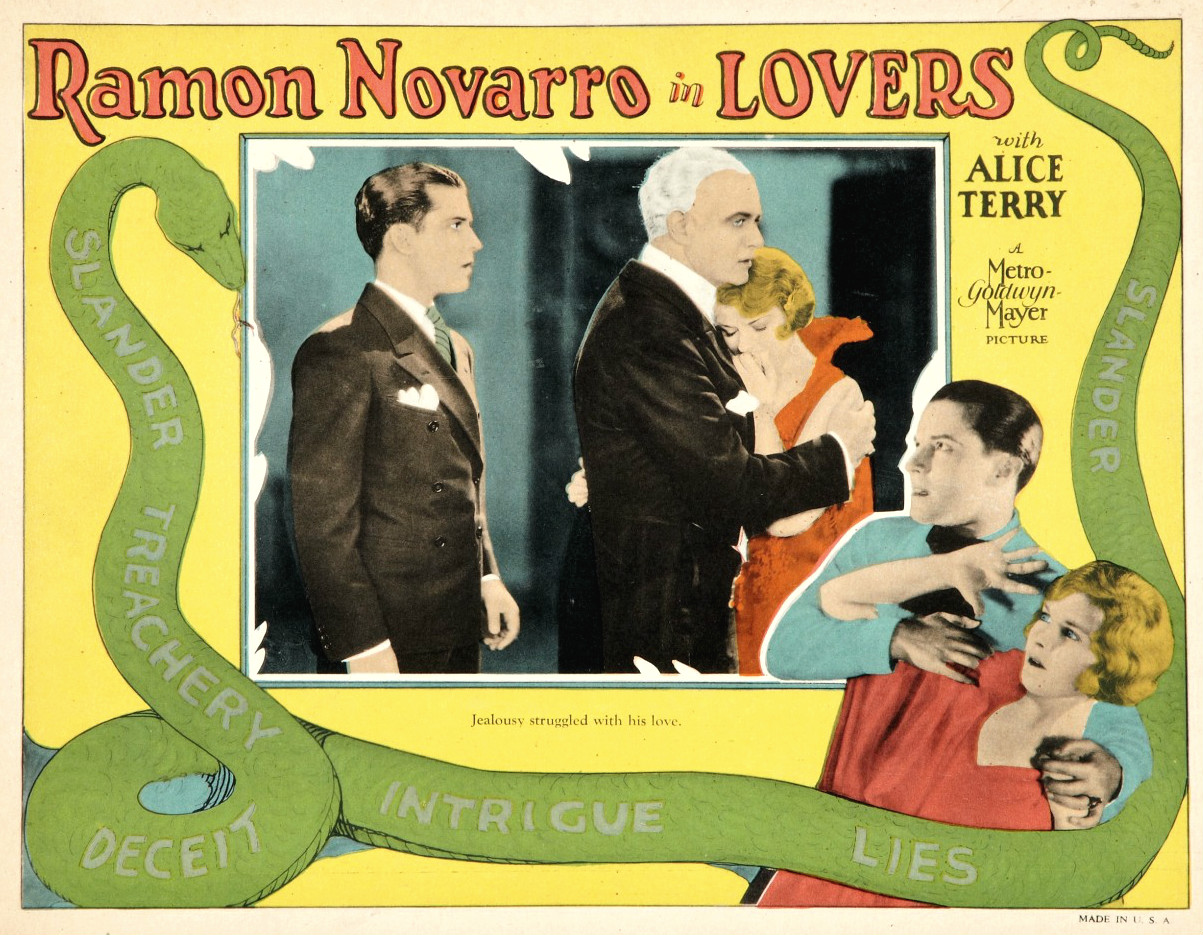
- Lobby card
- Directed by: John M. Stahl; Sidney Algier (ass't director)
- Written by: José Echegaray (original Spanish play: El Gran galeoto); Charles Frederic Nirdlinger (play: The World and His Wife); Douglas Furber (continuity); Sylvia Thalberg (continuity); Marian Ainslee (titles); Ruth Cummings (titles)
- Produced by: Louis B. Mayer; Irving Thalberg
- Starring: Ramon Novarro; Alice Terry
- Cinematography: Max Fabian
- Edited by: Margaret Booth
- Distributed by: MGM
- Release date: May 1, 1927
- Running time: 60 minutes; 6 reels
- Country: United States
- Language: Silent (English intertitles)
- Budget: $347,000

Lovers or Lovers? is a 1927 silent film romance drama produced and distributed by MGM and directed by John M. Stahl. It stars Ramon Novarro and Alice Terry. It is based on the 1908 play The World and His Wife and is a remake of a 1920 silent of the same name from Paramount. Lovers is a lost film.

== Cast ==
- Ramon Novarro as Jose
- Alice Terry as Felicia
- Edward Martindel as Don Julian
- Edward Connelly as Don Severo
- George K. Arthur as Pepito
- Lillian Leighton as Dona Mercedes
- Holmes Herbert as Milton
- John Miljan as Alvarez
- Roy D'Arcy as Senor Galdos

== See also ==
- The Celebrated Scandal (1915)
- The World and His Wife (1920)
