= Telling the World (film) =

1928 film

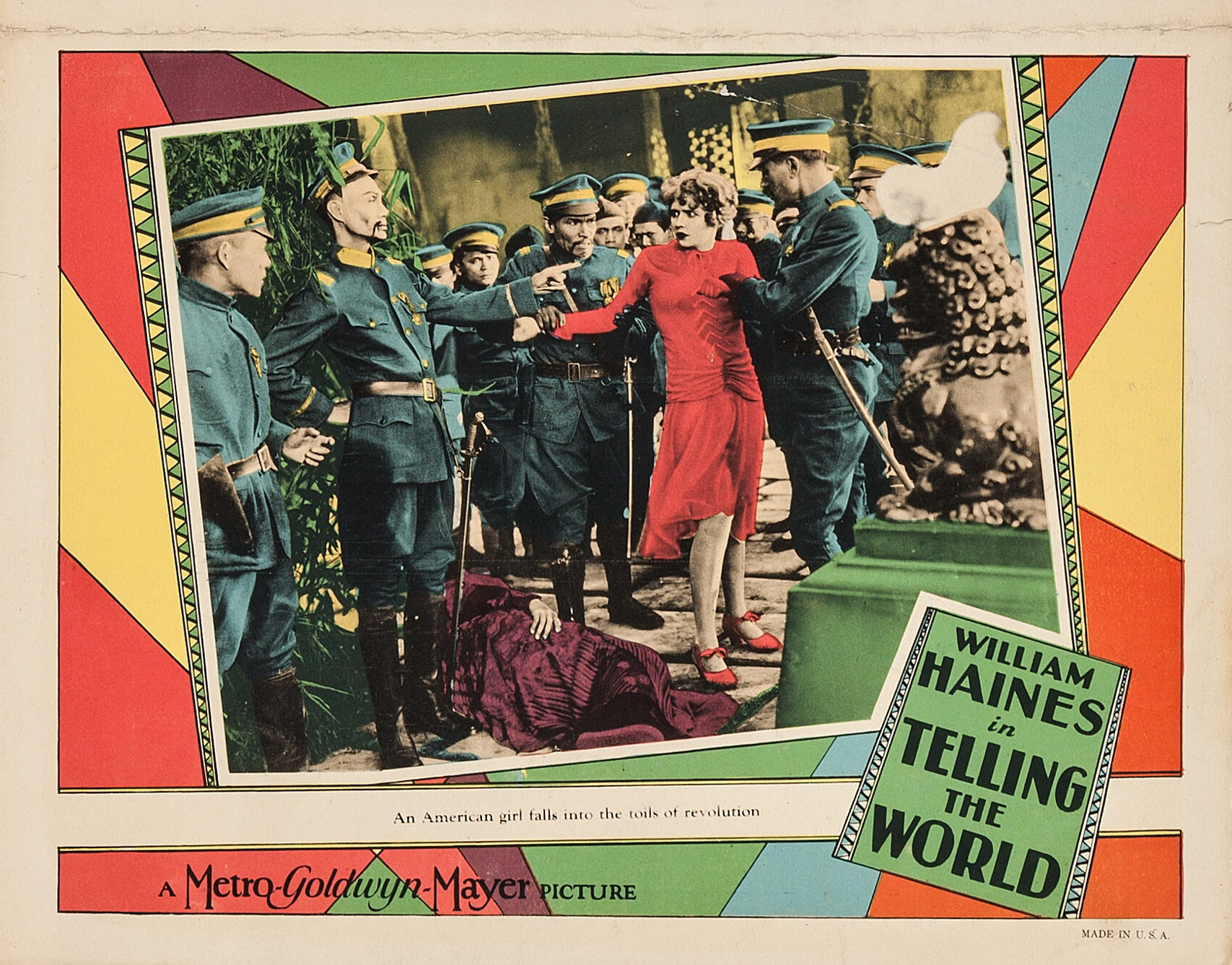
- Lobby card
- Directed by: Sam Wood
- Screenplay by: Joseph Farnham; Raymond L. Schrock
- Story by: Dale Van Every
- Starring: William Haines; Anita Page; Eileen Percy; Frank Currier; Polly Moran
- Cinematography: William H. Daniels
- Edited by: Margaret Booth; John Colton
- Production company: Metro-Goldwyn-Mayer
- Distributed by: Metro-Goldwyn-Mayer
- Release date: June 30, 1928
- Running time: 80 minutes
- Country: United States
- Language: Silent

Telling the World is a surviving 1928 American comedy silent film directed by Sam Wood and written by Joseph Farnham and Raymond L. Schrock. The film stars William Haines, Anita Page, Eileen Percy, Frank Currier, and Polly Moran. The film was released on June 30, 1928, by Metro-Goldwyn-Mayer.

== Cast ==
- William Haines as Don Davis
- Anita Page as Chrystal Malone
- Eileen Percy as Maizie
- Frank Currier as Mr. Davis
- Polly Moran as Landlady
- Bert Roach as Lane
- William V. Mong as City Editor
- Matthew Betz as The Killer

== Preservation status ==
This film is preserved and held by the British Film Institute, National Film and Television Archive.
