= The Temptress (1926 film) =

1926 film by Mauritz Stiller, Fred Niblo

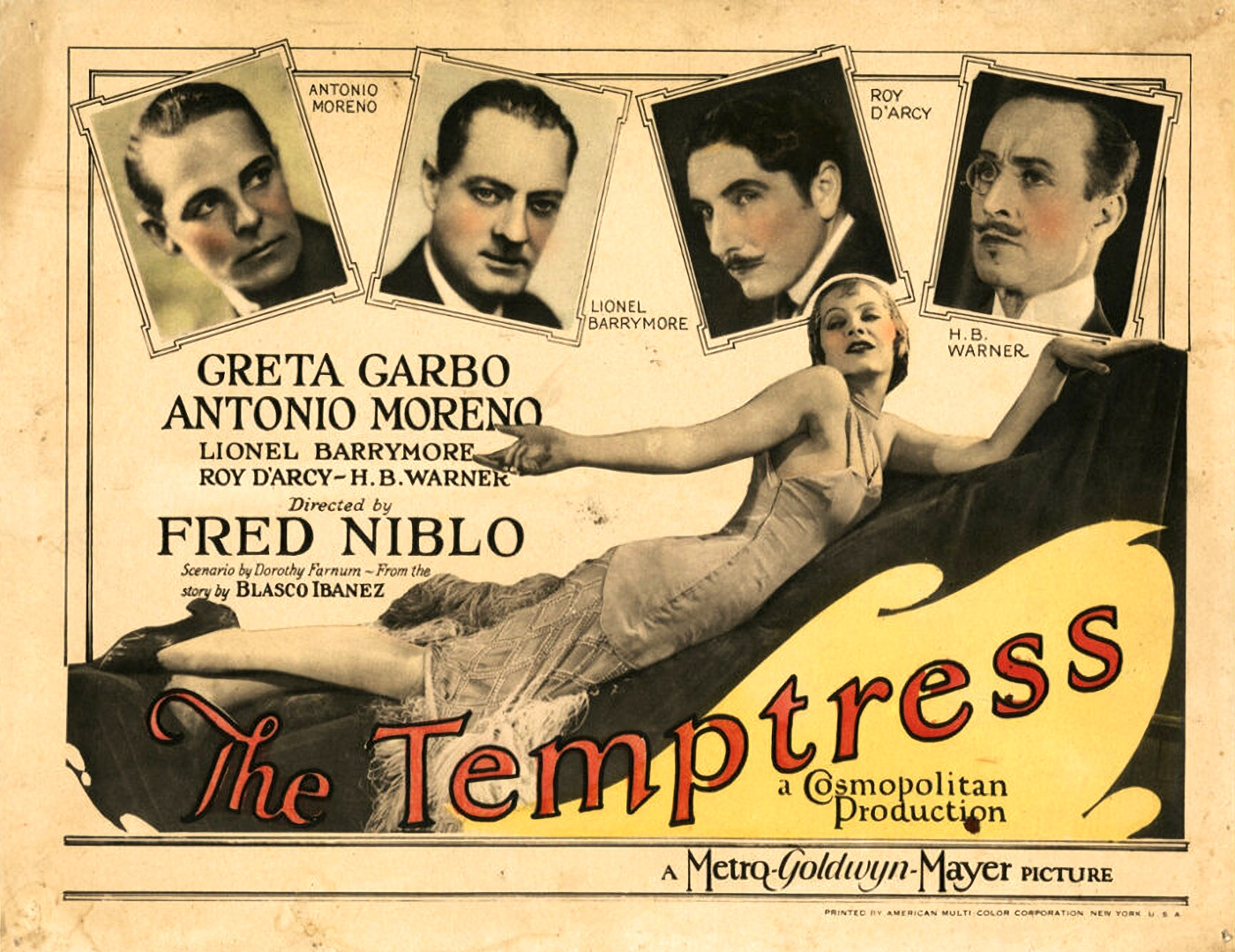
- Lobby card
- Directed by: Fred Niblo
- Written by: Dorothy Farnum
- Based on: La Tierra de Todos; 1922 novel by Vicente Blasco Ibáñez
- Produced by: Irving Thalberg
- Starring: Greta Garbo; Antonio Moreno; Lionel Barrymore
- Cinematography: William H. Daniels; Tony Gaudio
- Edited by: Lloyd Nosler
- Music by: Michael Picton
- Production companies: Cosmopolitan Productions; Metro-Goldwyn-Mayer
- Distributed by: Metro-Goldwyn-Mayer
- Release date: October 3, 1926
- Running time: 117 minutes
- Country: United States
- Language: Silent (English intertitles)
- Budget: $669,000, estimated.

The Temptress (1926)

The Temptress is a 1926 American silent romantic drama film directed by Fred Niblo and starring Greta Garbo, Antonio Moreno, Lionel Barrymore, and Roy D'Arcy. It premiered on October 3, 1926. The film melodrama was based on a novel by Vicente Blasco Ibáñez adapted for the screen by Dorothy Farnum.

== Cast ==
- Greta Garbo as Elena, who uses her physical beauty to "tempt" and manipulate the opposite sex.
- Antonio Moreno as Manuel Robledo, is an Argentine engineer on leave in Paris from a dam building project back home in Argentina.
- Marc McDermott as Fontenoy, middle-aged banker who had an affair with Elena during a difficult period and eventually commits suicide in a highly melodramatic fashion by drinking poisoned wine in public.
- Lionel Barrymore as Canterac
- Armand Kaliz as Marquis de Torre Bianca, a Frenchman and the husband of Elena, but also the close friend of Robledo.
- Roy D'Arcy as Manos Duras, a local Argentine bandit who, like Robledo, falls for Elena when she arrives in Argentina.
- Robert Anderson as Pirovani
- Francis McDonald as Timateo
- Hector Sarno as Rojas
- Virginia Brown Faire as Celinda
- Steve Clemente as Salvadore (uncredited)
- Roy Coulson as Trinidad (uncredited)
- Louise Emmons as Newspaper Vendor (uncredited)
- Inez Gomez as Sebastiana (uncredited)
- Bob Kortman as Duras Henchman (uncredited)
- Ethan Laidlaw as Caballero (uncredited)
- Annabelle Magnus as Little Girl (uncredited)
- Chrispin Martin as Argentine Ranch Hand (uncredited)
- Louis Mercier as Newspaper Vendor (uncredited)
- Alys Murrell as Josephine (uncredited)
- Constantine Romanoff as Duras Henchman (uncredited)
- Charles Stevens as Argentine Reveler (uncredited)
- Mauritz Stiller as Undetermined Secondary Role (uncredited)

== Production ==
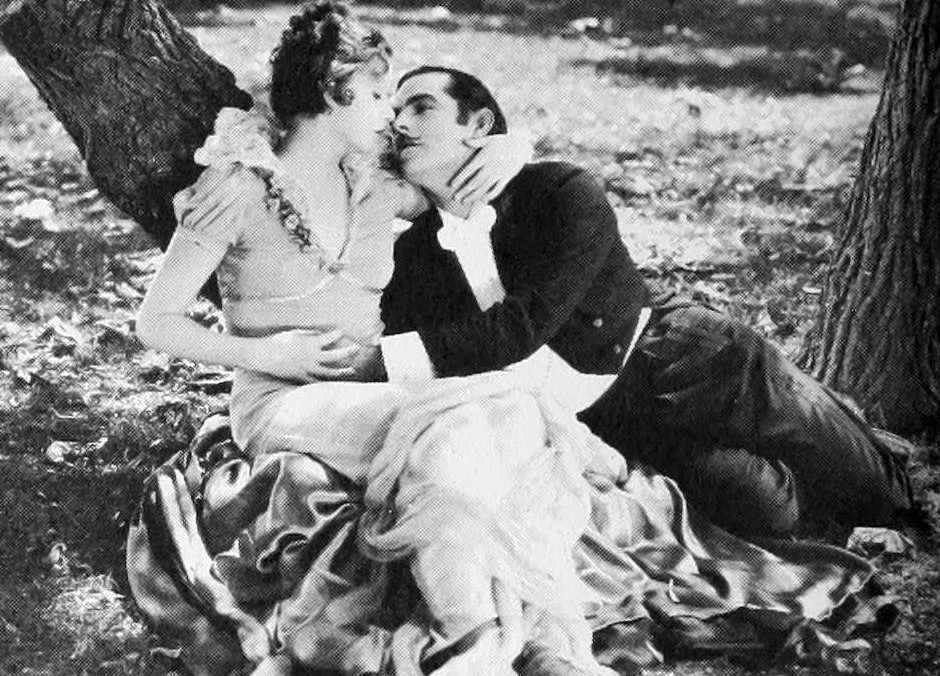
Garbo and Moreno

Mauritz Stiller was originally set to direct Greta Garbo's second film for MGM. However, after struggling working as a director within the Hollywood studio system, he was removed from directing and replaced by Fred Niblo. The film's sets were designed by the art director James Basevi.

Despite its filming difficulties, The Temptress proved to be a success, showing early signs of Garbo’s career potential. It grossed $587,000 domestically and $378,000 internationally; its worldwide gross was $965,000, though it lost $43,000.

After Louis B. Mayer viewed the finished picture, he was so depressed at the ending, that he ordered an alternate, happier ending to be made. Theaters at the time had the option of which ending to show, depending on what they felt were the tastes of their audience.

== Reception ==
Mordaunt Hall said "In many respects this picture is a distinguished piece of work, wherein Fred Niblo, the director, keeps the audience on the qui vive. It is a photodrama in which the producers do not pander to popular appeal by portraying a happy ending."

== Home media ==
The film was released on DVD on September 6, 2005 by Warner Home Video as part of the Greta Garbo collection also featuring the film Flesh and the Devil on the same disc. The alternate ending was included as well.
