= George Hill (director) =

American film director and cinematographer

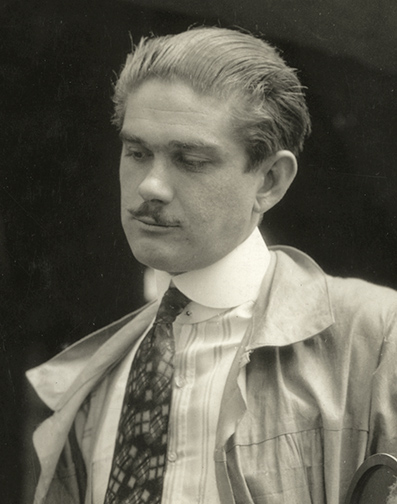
- Born: George William Hill; April 25, 1895; Douglass, Kansas, U.S.
- Died: August 10, 1934 (aged 39); Venice, California, U.S.
- Occupations: Film director, cinematographer
- Years active: 1908–1934
- Spouse: Frances Marion (m. 1930; div. 1933)

George William Hill (April 25, 1895 – August 10, 1934) was an American film director and cinematographer.

== Career ==
He began his film career at age 13 as a stagehand with director D. W. Griffith. A cinematographer of silent films known for his skill in lighting female stars, he worked on a series of independently produced features for Mae Marsh and others in the years following World War I and was eventually recruited by the burgeoning major studios to be a director, beginning in 1920. Hill directed The Midnight Express (1924), which the New York Times noted was "a far better production than one is apt to gather from the title" and also that "the story is unfolded with skill and imagination."

Through the following years, Hill's directing career began to gain serious traction and his assignments allowed him access to top stars such as Marion Davies and Jackie Coogan. Hill directed Lon Chaney's biggest money-maker, Tell It to the Marines (1926). Four years later, Wallace Beery headed the cast of one of Hill's most memorable films, The Big House (1930), a stark prison drama that is regarded by critics as a major achievement in early sound film artistry. For this film, and many others, he worked with his eventual wife, screenwriter Frances Marion (Hill and Marion married in 1930 and divorced in 1933).

Min and Bill (1931) paired Beery and Marie Dressler as alcoholic tugboat owner-operators, again with a script by Marion. This phenomenally popular film made both Beery and Dressler into Metro-Goldwyn-Mayer's two top stars for the next couple of years, and formed the basis for many later stereotypical routines about hard-nosed seagoing men.

== Death ==
Hill was severely injured in a June 1934 car accident just when his career was at its peak, and it is rumored that his injuries were the root cause of his apparent suicide two months later on August 10, 1934. His body was found in his Venice beach home with a self-inflicted gunshot wound. At the time of his death, Hill was preparing to direct, and had done some shooting in China for, The Good Earth, produced at MGM by Irving Thalberg, an Oscar-winning film released to great acclaim in 1937.

== Partial filmography ==
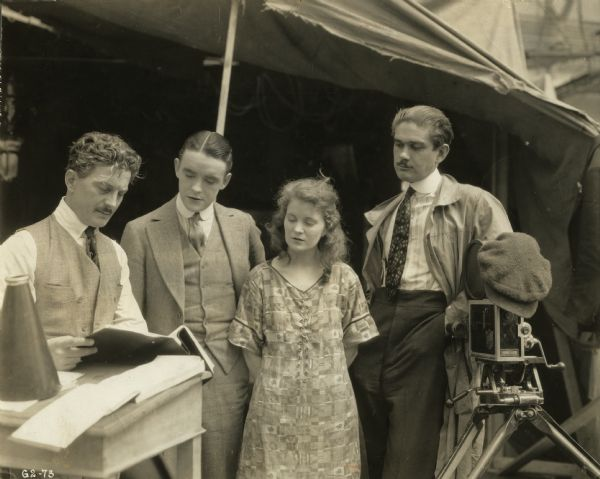
From left to right are director John W. Noble, actors Robert Harron and Mae Marsh, and cameraman George W. Hill in a production still for Sunshine Alley (1917)

=== Cinematography ===
- The Sea Wolf (1913)
- The Flying Torpedo (1916)
- Less Than the Dust (1916)
- The Cinderella Man (1917)
- Polly of the Circus (1917)
- The Waiting Soul (1917)
- The Beloved Traitor (1918)
- Our Little Wife (1918)

=== Director ===
- Get Your Man (1921)
- The Foolish Virgin (1924)
- Zander the Great (1925)
- The Barrier (1926)
- Tell It to the Marines (1926)
- The Callahans and the Murphys (1927)
- The Cossacks (1928)
- The Flying Fleet (1929)
- The Big House (1930)
- Min and Bill (1930)
- The Secret Six (1931)
- Hell Divers (1932) (uncredited)
