= Forbidden Hours =

1928 film by Harry Beaumont

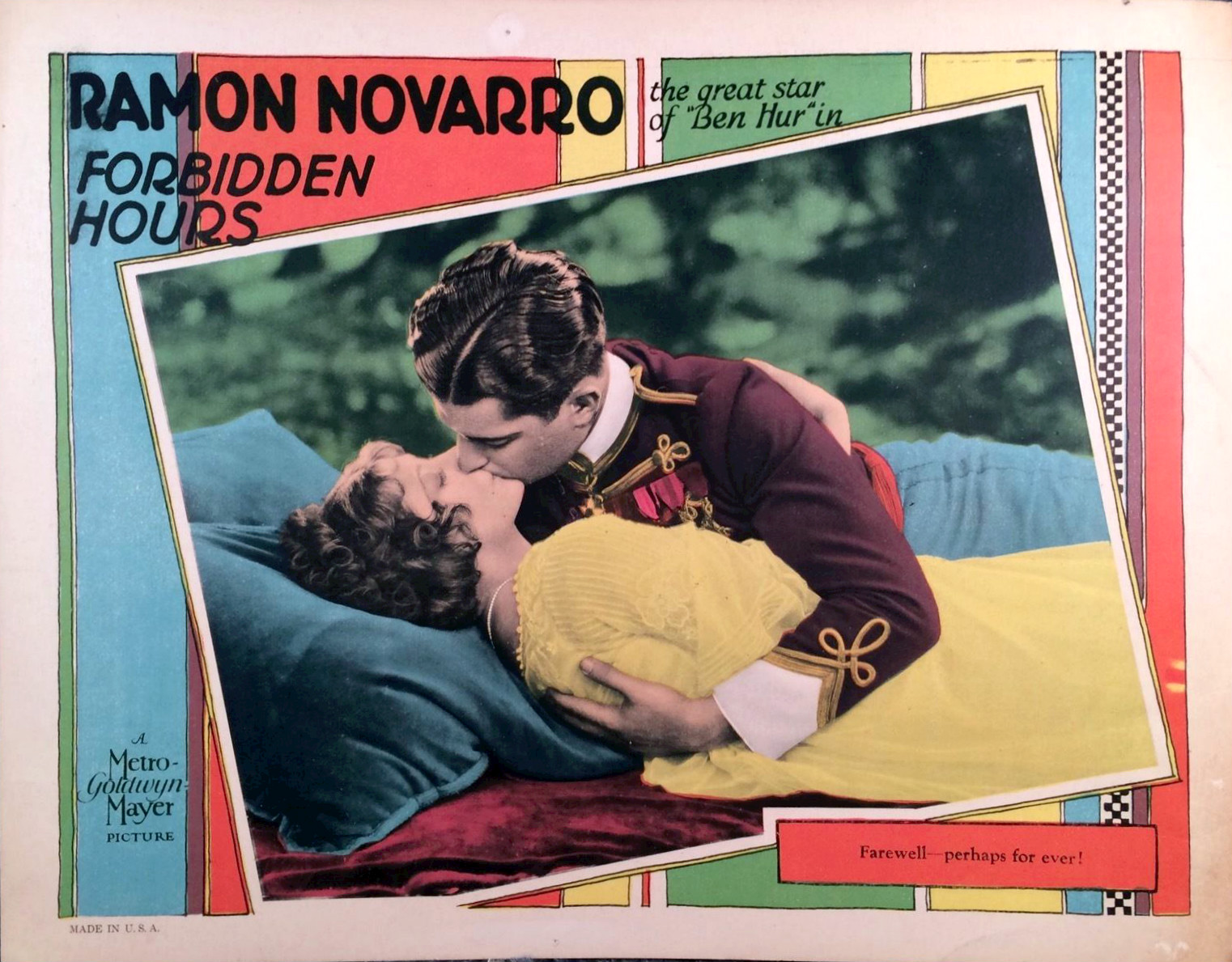
- Lobby card
- Directed by: Harry Beaumont
- Written by: Andrew Percival Younger
- Story by: Andrew Percival Younger; John Colton (titles)
- Starring: Ramon Novarro; Renée Adorée; Dorothy Cumming; Roy D'Arcy
- Cinematography: Merritt B. Gerstad
- Distributed by: Metro-Goldwyn-Mayer
- Release date: June 15, 1928
- Running time: 6 reels / 4987 or 5011 ft.
- Country: United States
- Language: Silent (English intertitles)
- Budget: $293,000

Forbidden Hours is a 1928 American silent romantic drama film directed by Harry Beaumont as a vehicle for Mexican-born star Ramon Novarro. It was the second of four films to pair Novarro with leading lady Renée Adorée.

== Plot ==
Set in the fictitious European kingdom of Balanca, Prince Michael IV is being coerced, by his advisers, to marry a young woman of royal blood. However, he has fallen for a peasant.

== Cast ==
- Ramon Novarro as His Majesty, Michael IV
- Renée Adorée as Marie de Floriet
- Dorothy Cumming as Queen Alexia
- Edward Connelly as Prime Minister
- Roy D'Arcy as Duke Nicky
- Mitzi Cummings as Princess Ena
- Alberta Vaughn as Nina
- Maurice de Canonge in a bit part (uncredited)

== Production ==
The film was shot in Los Angeles with a budget of $293,000. Working titles included The Sun King, His Night and The Loves of Louis. The script originally contained reworked plot elements from Man in the Iron Mask but these elements were eventually discarded and the film took on a more Prussian design scheme reminiscent of the earlier Novarro success, The Student Prince in Old Heidelberg. Plot elements were allegedly adapted from the reign of Louis XIV of France. The Palm Beach Post suggested that Marie of Romania had inspired the character of the Queen Mother, played by Dorothy Cumming.

News sources reported that Jacqueline Gadsden, Marcelle Corday and a Shirley O'Hara were also in the cast. Sven Hugo Borg may have also appeared in the film. In an expansion of the common silent-filmmaking convention of having live musicians on set, a vocalist worked on set to provide atmosphere for the actors; singer Lillian Rosine is credited as having "introduced the idea" and may have performed this task on the Forbidden Hours set.

As originally scripted, Prince Michael eventually marries his betrothed in order to keep peace between his nation and hers. The concluding scene showed him passing a convent where Marie now resides as a nun. This ending, which deliberately recalled Student Prince, was changed to a happier one, but press materials were still issued by the studio detailing the original ending, causing some confusion in the press.

== Reception ==
Forbidden Hours premiered at the Capitol Theater in New York on July 22, 1928. The film was greeted with mixed critical responses. The Film Daily described it as a "rehash of Student Prince and Merry Widow themes." The Palm Beach Post, however, was one source who praised the film's scenario, design and performances. Reviewer Anne Austin suggested in her report on the film's altered ending that Renée Adorée seemed too old for the role of Marie.

As a prestige picture, Forbidden Hours was widely distributed and advertised. At the California Theatre in San Jose, California, it was accompanied by Hi-Yeller Idea, a live prologue staged by Fanchon and Marco.

Forbidden Hours eventually made a profit of $109,000, but was considered a commercial disappointment by the studio. Long thought to be lost, it was discovered to have survived in 2000, and had its first theatrical screening in seventy-three years at the Bijou Theater in Lincoln City, Oregon in 2002.
