= Zander the Great =

1925 film

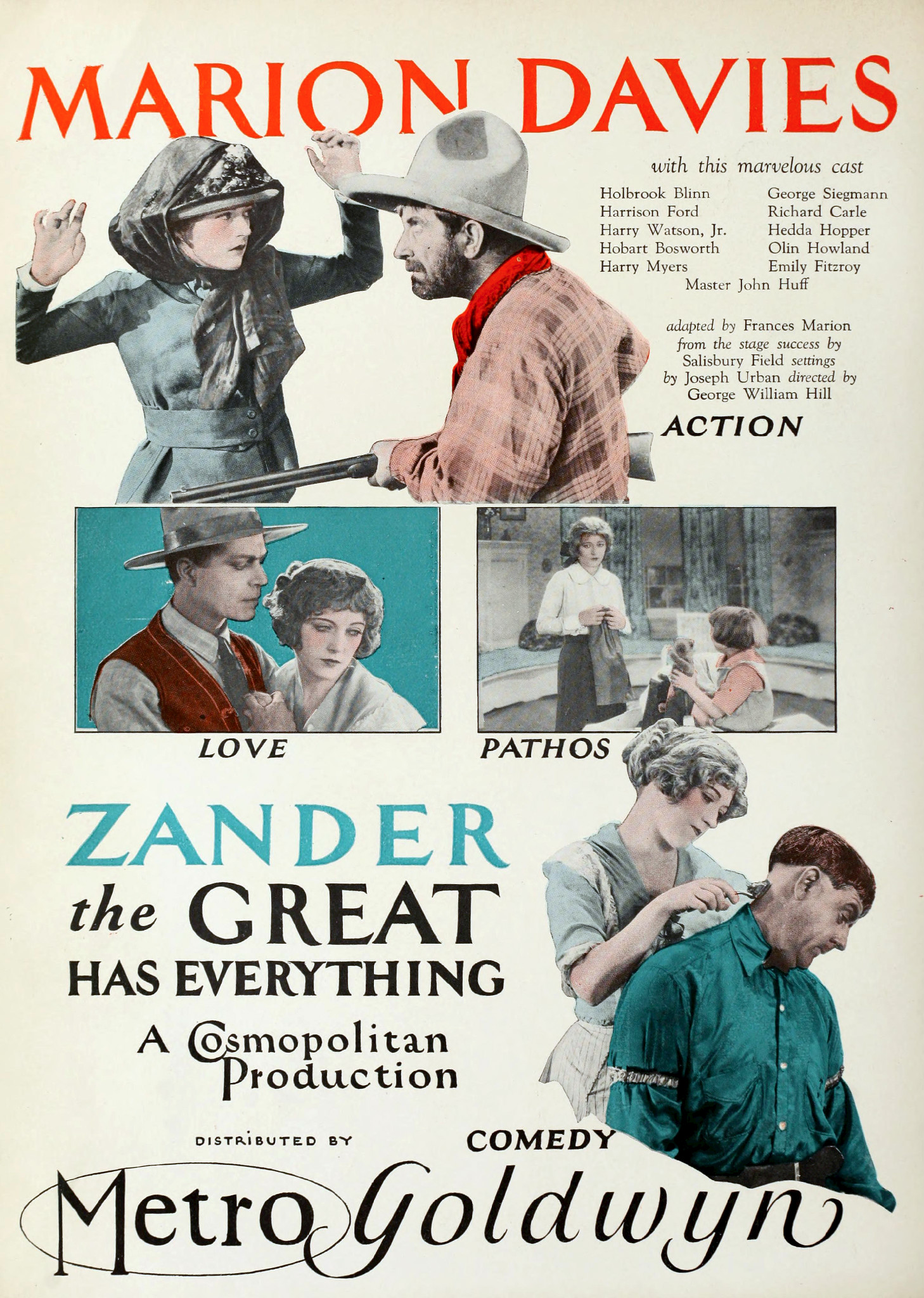
- Advertisement
- Directed by: George W. Hill
- Written by: Frances Marion
- Based on: Zander the Great by Edward Salisbury Field
- Produced by: William Randolph Hearst
- Starring: Marion Davies; Emily Fitzroy; Hedda Hopper
- Cinematography: George Barnes; Harold Wenstrom
- Edited by: W. Donn Hayes; James C. McKay
- Music by: Victor Schertzinger
- Production companies: Cosmopolitan Productions; Metro-Goldwyn-Mayer
- Distributed by: Metro-Goldwyn-Mayer
- Release date: May 2, 1925
- Running time: 80 minutes (8 reels)
- Country: United States
- Language: Silent (English intertitles)

Zander the Great (1925) by George W. Hill

Zander the Great is a 1925 American silent comedy drama film directed by George W. Hill, in his first directing role for MGM. The film stars Marion Davies. The screenplay by Frances Marion is based upon the Edward Salisbury Field 1923 play of the same name.

== Plot ==
Mamie Smith is rescued from an orphanage by Mrs. Caldwell, the mother of a small child whom Mamie calls Zander. Mrs. Caldwell dies, and Mamie takes Zander west in search of the boy's missing father. In Arizona she meets Dan Murchison, a liquor smuggler who pretends to be Caldwell in order to avoid the sheriff. Mamie falls in love with Dan but learns of his illegal activities and threatens to turn him in. Dan locks her up and sends Zander to his friend Juan for safekeeping. Mamie escapes and is captured by Black Bart's gang, who tie her to a tree. She frees herself and goes to Juan's men, arriving in time to round up the gang members. Dan tells Mamie that he is not Caldwell, and she and Dan are married.

== Cast ==
- Marion Davies as Mamie Smith
- Holbrook Blinn as Juan Fernández
- Harrison Ford as Dan Murchinson
- Harry Watson as Good News
- Harry Myers as Texas
- George Siegmann as Black Bart
- Emily Fitzroy as The Matron
- Hobart Bosworth as The Sheriff
- Richard Carle as Mr. Pepper
- Hedda Hopper as Mrs. Caldwell
- Olin Howland as Elmer
- Jack Huff as Zander (as Master Jack Huff)
- Josephine Crowell as Orphanage Trustee (uncredited)
- Betsy Ann Hisle as Little Girl (uncredited)
- Carmencita Johnson as Baby (uncredited)
- Dick Sutherland as Ugly Mug (uncredited)
- Pat Wing as Little Girl (uncredited)
- Toby Wing as Little Girl (uncredited)
- Thomas Jefferson as elderly Mailman (uncredited)

== Production ==
In her 20th film, Marion Davies starred as the orphan, Mamie Smith, in a comedy drama that was the first Davies film produced entirely on the West Coast and the first Davies production for MGM. This was another production that saw constant meddling from Hearst. He fired director Clarence Badger and brought in George W. Hill and Joseph Urban and re-shot extensive sections of the film. He reportedly burned the original footage. Hearst wanted the sand storm finale to outdo the storm scene in D. W. Griffith's Way Down East (1920), but critics said it was overdone to the point of being "claptrap hokum." The film was a hit.

Davies recalled a circus sequence in which she was to enter the cage of a lion. She was so terrified of the lion that she refused to do the scene. Charlie Chaplin, whom she had recently met in Hollywood and who was visiting the set, supposedly donned her costume and did the scene with the lion. Davies' longtime assistant, however, claimed the scene was more likely done by a stuntwoman. The scene is not in the surviving print, but there are production stills showing Davies in a circus setting. This was the third and final teaming of Davies with Harrison Ford.

== Preservation ==
Prints of Zander the Great are preserved at the Cinematheque Royale de Belgique, Library of Congress, and the Museum of Modern Art. Edward Lorusso produced a restored version of the film in 2021 with a score by Ben Model. This version, with original tinting restored, was released on Blu-ray February 1, 2022 by Undercrank Productions.
