= Beverly of Graustark =

1926 film by Sidney Franklin

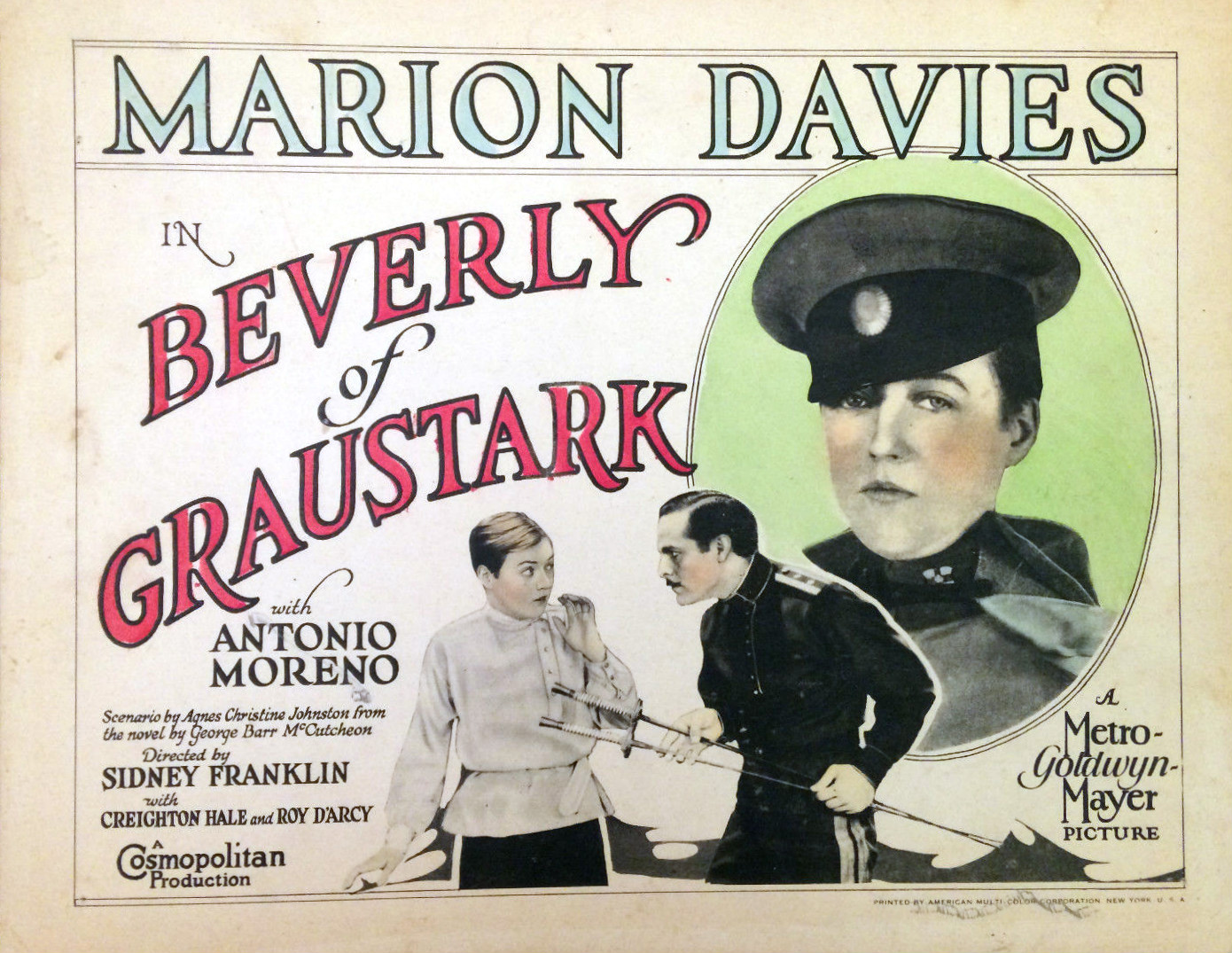
- Lobby card
- Directed by: Sidney Franklin
- Written by: Agnes Christine Johnston (scenario); Joseph W. Farnham (titles)
- Based on: Beverly of Graustark; 1904 novel by George Barr McCutcheon
- Starring: Marion Davies; Antonio Moreno; Creighton Hale
- Cinematography: Percy Hilburn
- Edited by: Frank E. Hull
- Production company: Cosmopolitan Productions
- Distributed by: Metro-Goldwyn-Mayer
- Release date: March 27, 1926; (United States)
- Running time: 70 minutes
- Country: United States
- Language: Silent (English intertitles)
- Budget: $357,000
- Box office: $756,000

Beverly of Graustark (1926) by Sidney Franklin

Beverly of Graustark is a 1926 American silent romantic comedy film directed by Sidney Franklin and starring Marion Davies, Antonio Moreno, and Creighton Hale.

The film's screenplay was written by Agnes Christine Johnston based on the novel by George Barr McCutcheon, and set in the fictional land of Graustark. The film features a final sequence in Technicolor. It was the first film by Sidney Franklin for MGM. The film received generally positive reviews, and performed well at the box office with gross proceeds totaling $756,000.

== Plot ==
Beverly Calhoun discovers that her Cousin Oscar is the heir to the throne of Graustark, a kingdom in Europe, so she decides to join him there. They are met by the Duke Travina, the temporary regent.

General Marlanax, pretender to the throne, learning of the young prince's arrival, plots with Saranoff to assassinate him. Meanwhile, Oscar has been injured while skiing in the Alps.

So Duke Travina suggests that Beverly wear Oscar's uniform and impersonate him until he recovers; Saranoff's plot is thwarted by Danton, the leader of a group of shepherds. Danton then becomes her constant companion and guard.

She then dons women's clothing in an effort to charm Danton, but he confuses her as a rival to the "prince", and he gets jealous, and challenges the prince to a duel.

Oscar then reveals the impersonation to Marlanax, but Danton, acknowledging himself to be the prince of a nearby kingdom, exposes the pretender's plot and in the end, wins the hand of Beverly.

== Cast ==
- Marion Davies as Beverly Calhoun
- Antonio Moreno as Dantan
- Creighton Hale as Prince Oscar
- Roy D'Arcy as General Marlanax
- Albert Gran as Duke Travina
- Paulette Duval as Carlotta
- Max Barwyn as Saranoff
- Charles Clary as Mr. Calhoun
- Sidney Bracey as the valet
- Lou Duello as dancer
- Edward Scarpa as peasant
- Percy Williams as the butler

== Background and production ==
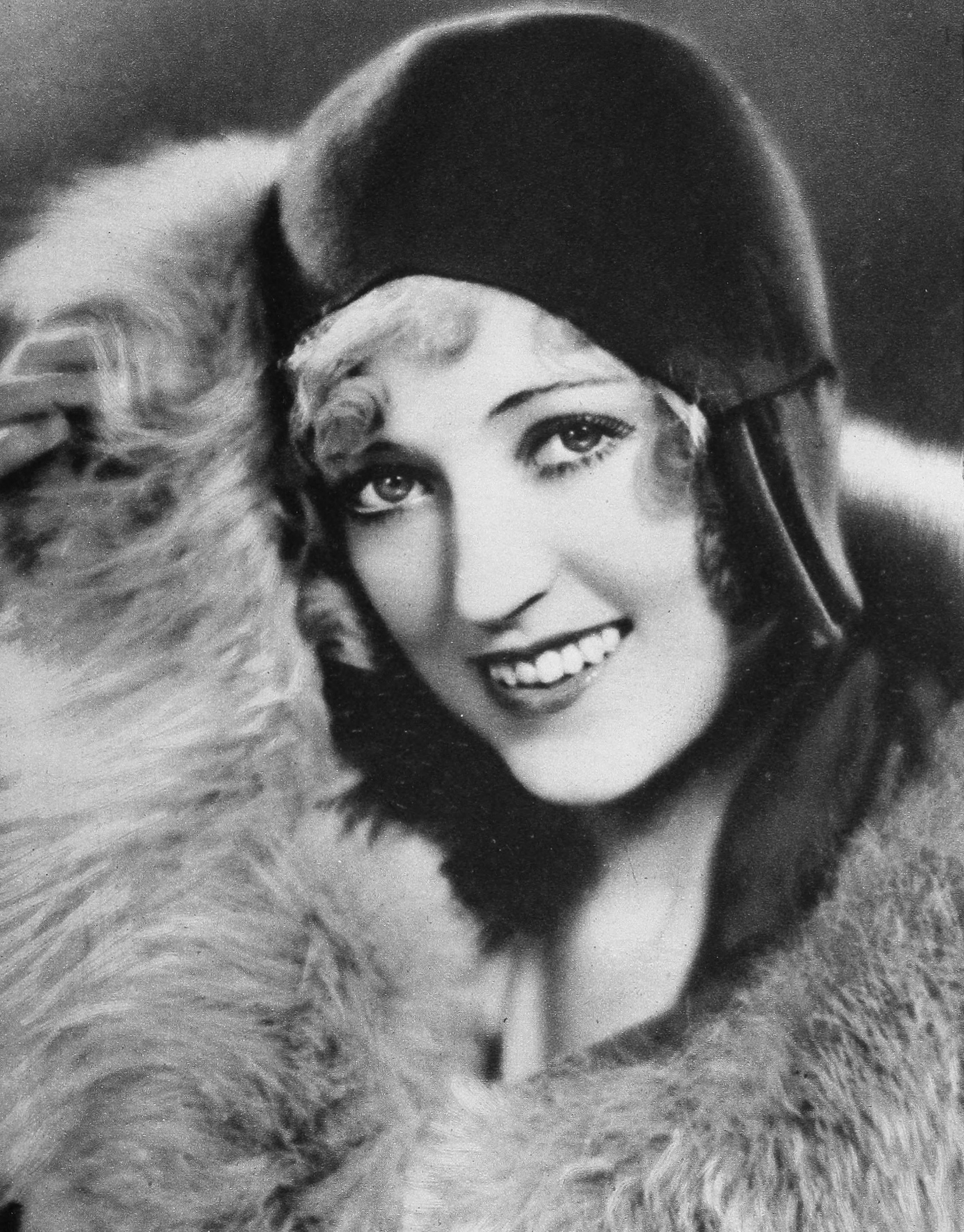
Marion Davies

Filming was suspended on the project for ten days in January 1926, due to Davies suffering from an attack of influenza. Davies recalls that in preparation for the role, she had to learn to walk like a man, cut her hair short and tried to look like a young man, she practiced a military swagger as well.

To look like Prince Oscar it was necessary for me to alter my eyebrows, paint my eyelashes so that they would not show and paint my lips so that they appeared straighter and less conspicuous. I added nothing to my face but tried to tone down the feminine features. I discovered that men often walk with their toes straight out, whereas a woman is more graceful, as she walks with her toes slightly turned out. I practiced before a long mirror to master the masculine gait.

Roy D'Arcy said the elaborate uniform he wore in the film was made according to an actual uniform from Middle Europe, and that it fit so tightly that "it almost had to be put on with a shoe horn." He recalled that between scenes, he couldn't sit down, so he had to stand up, until the director, Sidney Franklin, invented a special seat for him, "consisting of a bicycle seat mounted on a tripod."

== Release ==
The film had its world premiere in March 1926 at the Warfield Theatre in San Francisco. During its two week run at the Capitol Theatre in New York City, the film grossed $101,962, and at Loews Theatre in Los Angeles, during a five day run, it grossed $32,000. Overall, the film did very well at the box office, with a total gross of $756,000, on a budget of $357,000. It had $539,000 in domestic earnings, and $217,000 in foreign earnings.

The film was screened at the Library of Congress in the summer of 1999, in a film series titled "Beyond Fairbanks: The Silent Adventurers".

== Restoration ==
The Library of Congress restored the 1926 film in 2019, scanning an original-release 35mm nitrate print in the Marion Davies Collection that included the 2-color Technicolor sequence in the 2nd half of the film's last reel. This 4K restoration was screened in October 2019 at the Pordenone Silent Film Festival in Pordenone, northern Italy. Undercrank Productions released the restoration on Blu-ray and DVD in April 2022, featuring a new musical score by Ben Model.

== Reception ==
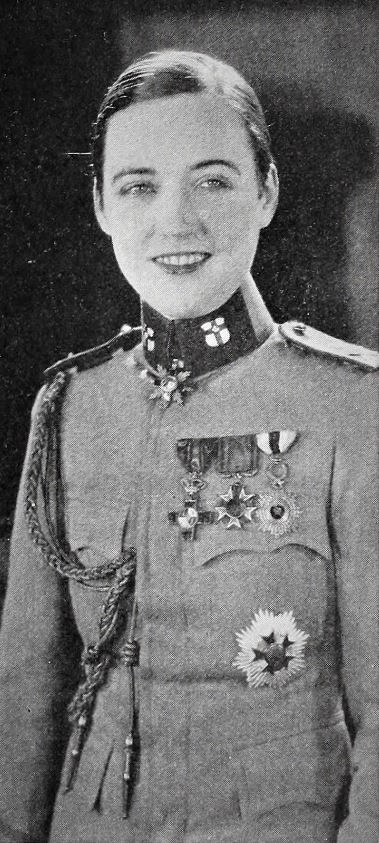
Still from the film with "Beverly" pretending to be Cousin Oscar

Film historian Jeanine Basinger wrote the film gives "Davies an excellent chance to show off her skills as a comedienne; she carries off an extended drinking scene with the aplomb of a Buster Keaton; required by the plot to show that she's both terribly drunk and under great pressure to fake sobriety, she is hilarious; she has spirit, it's impossible to watch her and not feel that she's having a grand old time." The National Board of Review Magazine said that even though the screen version is quite unlike the book, the story is amusing and the acting of Davies and Moreno is very good.

Film critic Robert Sherwood opined that Davis should wear trousers oftener; they affect her favorably — improving not only her appearance, but her whole attitude; indeed, when Davies changes from masculine to feminine attire, one looks upon her as a female impersonator who is not particularly convincing — which constitutes a remarkable tribute to her ability to wear pants. He also observed that when Davies is appearing as the fresh young prince, the film is a sprightly and amusing picture, but when she goes back into neutral, it becomes dreary, obvious and appallingly dull.

Roy Chartier of The Billboard stated that Davies does herself proud; she is hard to beat, and proves it in this picture. He also complimented the acting of Moreno as being at his best, and Creighton Hale more than adequately good, and Roy D'Arcy also gives his usual polished performance. He further observed that though it may not be just to pin Franklin down with the blame, the last few feet of the film detracted from rather than heightened the general caliber of the production by being done in colors.

George Pardy wrote in the Motion Picture News they have produced the feature lavishly, the backgrounds and settings are undeniably gorgeous and the costumes are things of beauty, even the mere males appearing in uniforms that enchant the aristic eye; Franklin has made a capital job of the direction; photography and lighting effect admirable. Film critic Mordaunt Hall said this picture is produced with stunning uniforms and costumes, compelling scenic effects and elaborate settings; Davies is in her element and she displays no mean ability in the handling of the role.

== See also ==
- List of American films of 1926
- List of early color feature films
- List of LGBTQ-related films of the 1920s
