= Valencia (1926 film) =

1926 film directed by Dimitri Buchowetzki

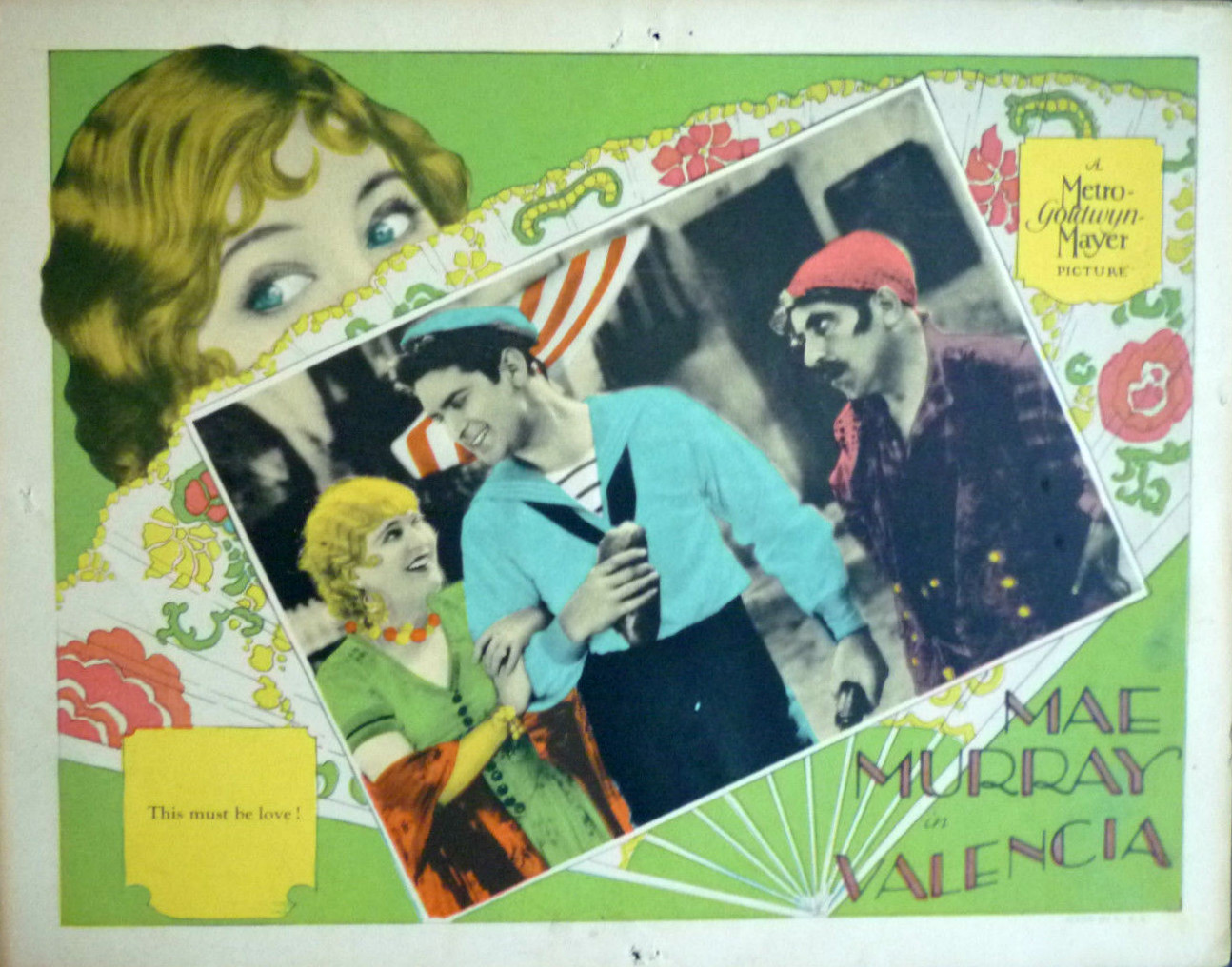
- lobby card
- Directed by: Dimitri Buchowetzki
- Written by: Dimitri Buchowetzki; Alice D. G. Miller
- Produced by: Irving Thalberg
- Starring: Mae Murray; Lloyd Hughes
- Cinematography: Percy Hilburn
- Edited by: Hugh Wynn
- Distributed by: Metro-Goldwyn-Mayer
- Release date: December 18, 1926
- Running time: 60 minutes
- Country: United States
- Language: Silent (English intertitles)

Valencia, also known as The Love Song, is a 1926 American silent romance film directed by Dimitri Buchowetzki, who came over from Paramount to direct. The film stars Mae Murray and features Boris Karloff in an uncredited role. The film was a box office hit and the title song, Valencia, was the top song in the U.S. for the year. A print of the film survives.

== Plot ==
Handsome sailor Felipe and nasty Governor Don Fernando are rivals for the favors of Spanish dancer Valencia. When Felipe deserts his ship, Don Fernando throws him in prison, but Valencia obtains his release and shares his disgrace and exile.

== Cast ==
- Mae Murray as Valencia
- Lloyd Hughes as Felipe
- Roy D'Arcy as Don Fernando
- Max Barwyn as Don Alvarado
- Michael Vavitch as Captain
- Michael Visaroff as Cafe Owner
- Boris Karloff as Bit (uncredited)
