= Winners of the Wilderness =

1927 film

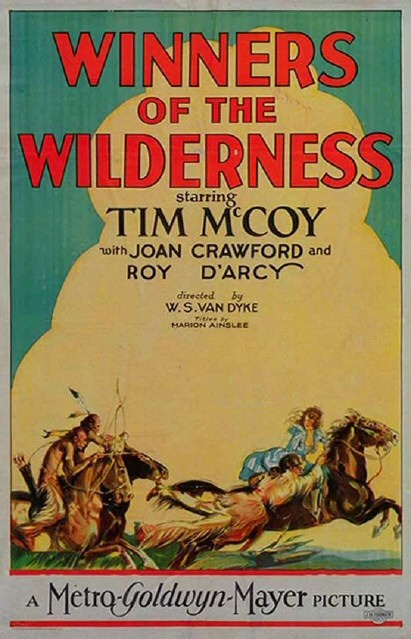
- Original film poster
- Directed by: W. S. Van Dyke
- Written by: Story: John Thomas Neville; Continuity: Josephine Chippo; Titles: Marian Ainslee
- Starring: Tim McCoy; Joan Crawford; Edward Connelly; Roy D'Arcy; Ernest Ian Torrence
- Cinematography: Clyde De Vinna
- Edited by: Conrad A. Nervig
- Distributed by: Metro-Goldwyn-Mayer
- Release date: January 27, 1927
- Running time: 68 minutes
- Country: United States
- Languages: Silent (English intertitles)

Winners of the Wilderness is a 1927 American silent war drama film directed by W. S. Van Dyke and starring Tim McCoy and Joan Crawford. In this costume drama, set during the French and Indian War (1754–1763), Rene Contrecouer (Crawford), the daughter of a French general falls for a soldier of fortune (McCoy). The film was photographed mostly in black and white, but one scene was in color by Technicolor.

== Cast ==
- Tim McCoy – Colonel Sir Dennis O'Hara
- Joan Crawford – Rene Contrecoeur
- Edward Connelly – General Contrecoeur
- Roy D'Arcy – Captain Dumas
- Louise Lorraine – Mimi
- Edward Hearn – General George Washington
- Tom O'Brien – Timothy
- Will Walling – General Edward Braddock
- Frank Currier – Governor de Vaudreuil
- Lionel Belmore – Governor Dinwiddie of Virginia
- Chief John Big Tree – Chief Pontiac

== Crew ==
- David Townsend - Set Designer

== See also ==
- List of early color feature films
