= Adam and Evil (1927 film) =

1927 film directed by Robert Z. Leonard

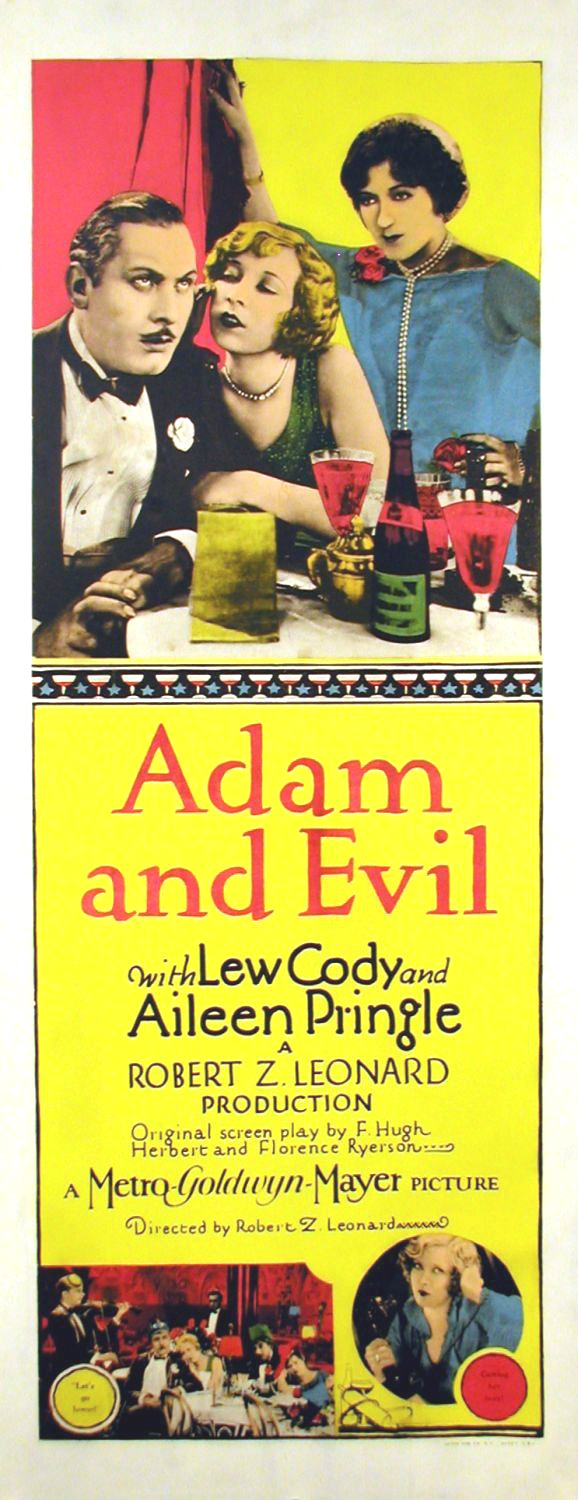
- Film poster
- Directed by: Robert Z. Leonard
- Screenplay by: F. Hugh Herbert; Florence Ryerson; Ralph Spence
- Starring: Lew Cody; Aileen Pringle; Gwen Lee; Gertrude Short
- Cinematography: André Barlatier - (French Wikipedia)
- Edited by: Leslie F. Wilder
- Production company: Metro-Goldwyn-Mayer
- Distributed by: Metro-Goldwyn-Mayer
- Release date: August 27, 1927
- Running time: 70 minutes
- Country: United States
- Language: Silent (English intertitles)

Adam and Evil is a lost 1927 American silent comedy film directed by Robert Z. Leonard and written by F. Hugh Herbert, Florence Ryerson and Ralph Spence. The film stars Lew Cody, Aileen Pringle, Gwen Lee, Gertrude Short, Hedda Hopper, and Roy D'Arcy. The film was released on August 27, 1927, by Metro-Goldwyn-Mayer.

== Plot ==
"The little fur-bearing animals that are sacrificed for the vanity of women desiring fur coats have a posthumous revenge."

== Cast ==
- Lew Cody as Adam Trevelyan / Allan Trevelyan
- Aileen Pringle as Evelyn Trevelyan
- Gwen Lee as Gwen De Vere
- Gertrude Short as Dora Dell
- Hedda Hopper as Eleanor Leighton
- Roy D'Arcy as Mortimer Jenkins

== Censorship ==
When Adam and Evil was released, many states and cities in the United States had censor boards that could require cuts or other eliminations before the film could be shown. The Kansas censor board ordered a cut of a scene with the sign, "Do Not Disturb."

== Preservation ==
With no copies of Adam and Evil listed in any film archives, Adam and Evil is a lost film.
