= Shadows of the Night (film) =

1928 film

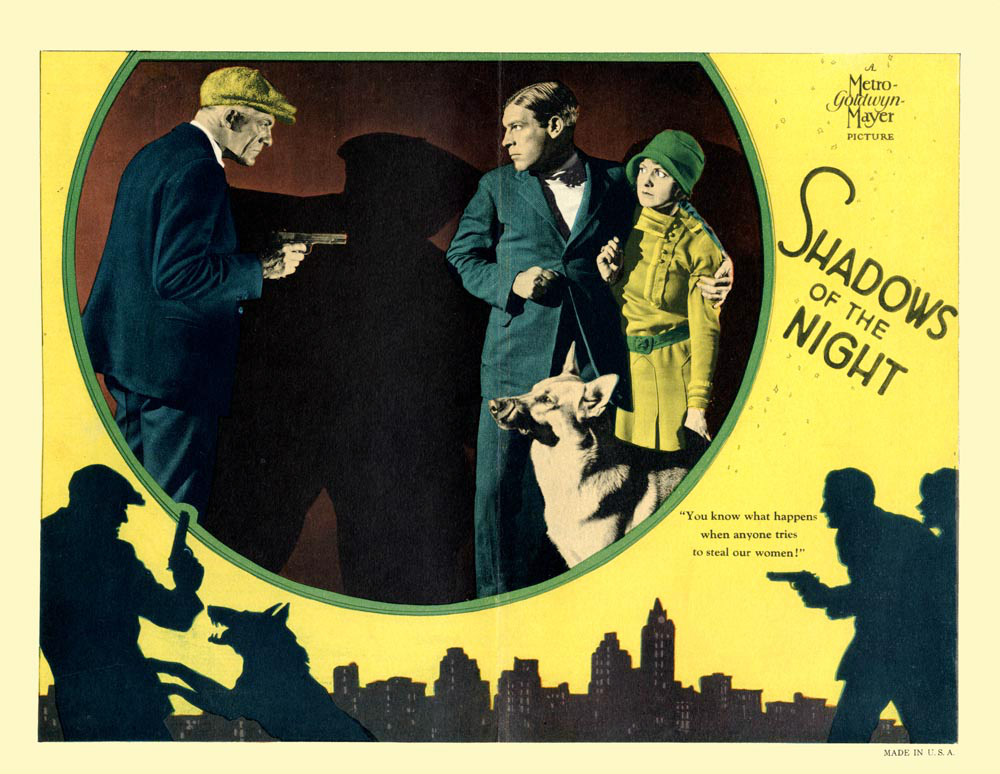
- Lobby card
- Directed by: D. Ross Lederman
- Screenplay by: Robert E. Hopkins; D. Ross Lederman]
- Story by: Ted Shane
- Starring: Flash the Dog; Lawrence Gray; Louise Lorraine; Warner Richmond; Tom Dugan
- Cinematography: Max Fabian
- Edited by: Dan Sharits
- Production company: Metro-Goldwyn-Mayer
- Distributed by: Metro-Goldwyn-Mayer
- Release date: October 26, 1928
- Running time: 70 minutes
- Country: United States
- Language: Silent (English intertitles)

Shadows of the Night is a 1928 American silent drama film directed by D. Ross Lederman and written by Robert E. Hopkins and D. Ross Lederman. The film stars Flash the Dog, Lawrence Gray, Louise Lorraine, Warner Richmond, and Tom Dugan. It was released on October 26, 1928, by Metro-Goldwyn-Mayer.

A copy of Shadows of the Night is housed at the Cinémathèque Française in Paris, France.

== Cast ==
- Flash the Dog as Flash
- Lawrence Gray as Jimmy Sherwood
- Louise Lorraine as Molly
- Warner Richmond as Feagan
- Tom Dugan as Connelly
- Alphonse Ethier as O'Flaherty
- Polly Moran as Entertainer
- Drew Demorest
- Joyzelle Joyner as Cabaret Dancer
- Robert Perry
- Eddie Sturgis
