= Max Fabian (cinematographer) =

Maksymilian "Maximilian" Fabian (May 1, 1891, Lemberg, Galicia, Austria-Hungary – June 30, 1969, Los Angeles, California) was a Polish-Jewish cinematographer who is credited on 18 films. Among his more notable work, he was the cinematographer for El Presidio (1930), Shadows of the Night (1928), The Gay Deceiver (1926), and The Thirteenth Hour (1927).

== Partial filmography ==
- The Strangers' Banquet (1922)
- Mr. Barnes of New York (1922)
- The Dust Flower (1922)
- Don't (1925)
- The Barrier (1926)
- Frisco Sally Levy (1927)
- Lovers? (1927)
- The Thirteenth Hour (1927)
- In Old Kentucky (1927)
- Shadows of the Night (1928)
- Honeymoon (1928)
- Voice of the City (1929)
- The Hollywood Revue of 1929 (1929)
