= Honeymoon (1928 American film) =

1928 film

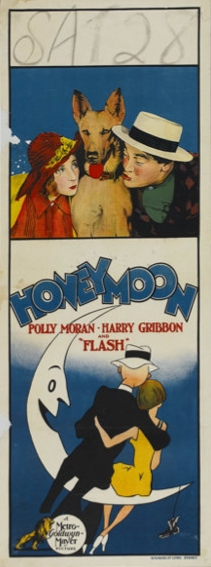
- Movie poster
- Directed by: Robert A. Golden
- Written by: Lew Lipton (story); Richard Schayer (adaptation); George O'Hara (writer); Robert E. Hopkins (titles)
- Starring: Polly Moran; Harry Gribbon
- Cinematography: Max Fabian
- Edited by: Ben Lewis
- Distributed by: MGM
- Release date: December 29, 1928
- Running time: 60 minutes
- Country: United States
- Languages: Silent film English intertitles

Honeymoon is a 1928 silent film comedy produced and distributed by MGM and directed by Robert A. Golden. It stars Polly Moran, Harry Gribbon and Bert Roach.

It is a surviving film.

== Cast ==
- Polly Moran – Polly
- Harry Gribbon – Harry
- Bert Roach – Bert
- Flash the Dog – Flash
- Dick Sutherland – Uncredited Bit
