= Frisco Sally Levy =

1927 film by William Beaudine

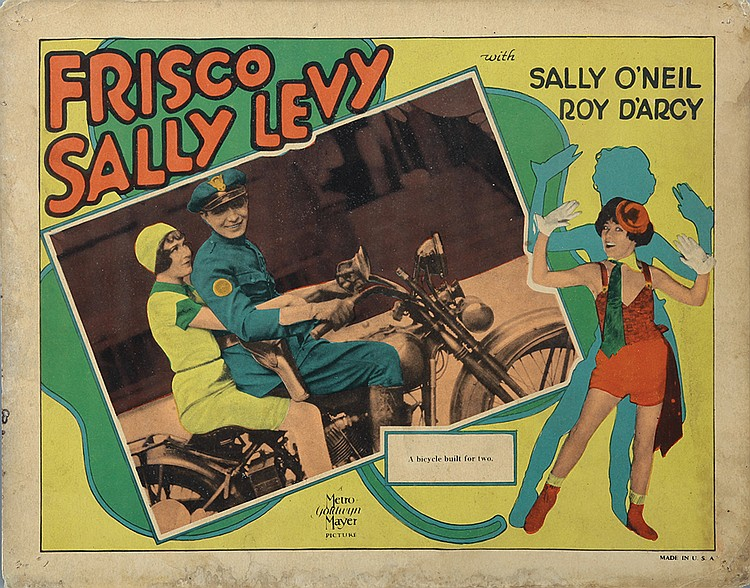
- Directed by: William Beaudine
- Screenplay by: Alfred A. Cohn, adaptation: Vernon Smith
- Story by: Alfred A. Cohn; Lew Lipton; Joseph Farnham
- Starring: Tenen Holtz; Kate Price; Sally O'Neil
- Cinematography: Max Fabian
- Edited by: Blanche Sewell
- Distributed by: Metro Goldwyn Mayer
- Release date: April 2, 1927
- Running time: 70 minutes
- Country: United States
- Language: English

Frisco Sally Levy (a.k.a. "Véspera de Natal") is a lost 1927 comedy silent film directed by William Beaudine and starring Sally O'Neil and Roy D'Arcy, which was released on April 2, 1927.

== Plot ==
Colleen Lapidowitz falls in love with an Irish police officer named Patrick Sweeney, which is a relief to her Jewish father Isaac and Irish mother Bridget who have tried to discourage her interest in a sleazy lounge lizard named Stuart Gold.

== Cast ==
- Tenen Holtz as Isaac Solomon Lapidowitz
- Kate Price as Bridget O'Grady Lapidowitz
- Sally O'Neil as Sally Colleen Lapidowitz
- Leon Holmes as Michael Abraham Lapidowitz
- Turner Savage as Isidore Pastrick Lapidowitz
- Helen Levine as Rebecca Patricia Lapidowitz
- Roy D'Arcy as I. Stuart Gold
- Charles Delaney as Patrick Sweeney
- Cameo the Dog

== Crew ==
- Cedric Gibbons - Art Director
- David Townsend - Art Director
- René Hubert - Costume Design
