= The Thirteenth Hour (1927 film) =

1927 film

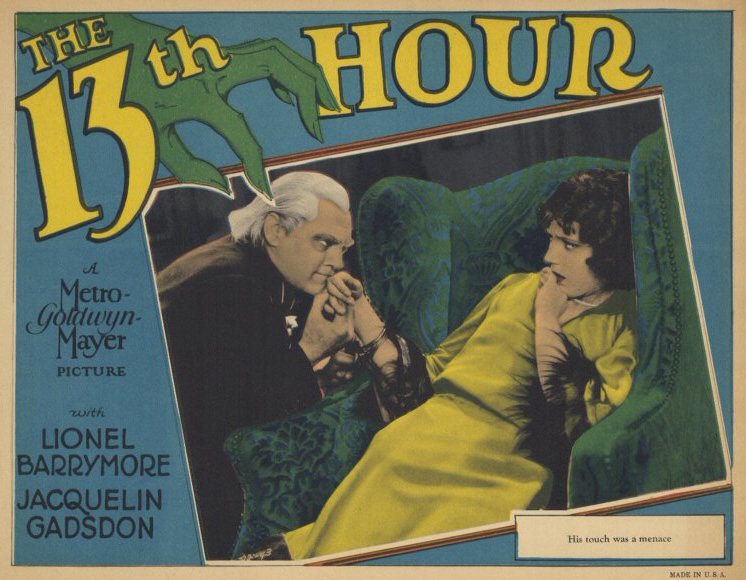
- 1927 lobby card
- Directed by: Chester M. Franklin
- Written by: Edward T. Lowe Jr.
- Screenplay by: Chester M. Franklin; Douglas Furber
- Story by: Chester M. Franklin; Douglas Furber; Sydney Horler(novelization); Intertitles: Wellyn Totman
- Starring: Lionel Barrymore; Jacqueline Gadsdon; Charles Delaney
- Cinematography: Max Fabian
- Edited by: Dan Sharits
- Distributed by: Metro-Goldwyn-Mayer
- Release date: October 13, 1927 (United States)
- Running time: 6 reels, 5,252 feet
- Country: United States
- Languages: Silent film (English intertitles)

The Thirteenth Hour (aka:The 13th Hour) is a 1927 American silent mystery film produced and distributed by Metro-Goldwyn-Mayer and directed by Chester M. Franklin. The film stars Lionel Barrymore in a role where, as noted criminologist Professor Leroy, he dons a weird series of disguises to hide a dark secret. This was the first film where Barrymore was cast opposite talented dogs, and the first where he was cast as a serial killer.

A print of this film survives in 16mm.

== Plot ==
Junior detective Gray discovers that the eccentric criminologist Professor Leroy is both a crook and a murderer. A German Shepherd chases the elusive LeRoy throughout a large house filled with secret rooms.

== Cast ==
- Lionel Barrymore as Professor Leroy
- Jacqueline Gadsdon as Mary Lyle
- Charles Delaney as Matt Gray
- Fred Kelsey as Detective Shaw
- Polly Moran as Polly
- Napoleon the Dog as the dog "Flash" or "Rex"
- Sojin

== See also ==
- Lionel Barrymore filmography
- One Exciting Night
- The Monster
- The Bat
- The Cat and the Canary
- The Old Dark House
- The Bat Whispers
- The Cat Creeps
