= Baby Mine =

Baby Mine may refer to:

== Arts and entertainment ==
=== Films and plays ===
- Baby Mine (play), a 1910 Broadway play by Margaret Mayo
- Baby Mine (1917 film), based on the 1910 play
- Baby Mine (1928 film), remake of the 1917 film

=== Music ===
- "Baby Mine", a popular song published in 1901
- "Baby Mine" (song), a song from the 1941 Disney film Dumbo and also in the 2019 Tim Burton remake
- "Baby Mine", a version of traditional blues song "Crawdad Song" from the 1963 album Bill Henderson with the Oscar Peterson Trio
- "Baby Mine", a 1966 R&B/Soul song by Thelma Houston

=== Publications ===
- Baby Mine (comic strip), syndicated comic strip (1930–1939)
- Baby Mine, a 1992 novel by Erica Spindler

== Other uses ==
- Baby Mine (steamboat) of the Hunt Brothers steamboat line
- Baby Mine, also known as Pocahontas Exhibition Coal Mine (declared a National Historic Landmark in 1994)

== See also ==
- "(Oh Baby Mine) I Get So Lonely", a 1953 song written by Pat Ballard
- Baby Be Mine (disambiguation)
