= Brian Morgan =

Brian Morgan may refer to:

- Brian Morgan (snooker player) (born 1968), English snooker player and coach
- Brian Morgan (lawyer) (1950–2007), Canadian lawyer
- Brian Alexander Morgan, record producer

== See also ==
- Bryan Morgan (disambiguation)
