= Bryan Morgan =

Bryan Morgan may refer to:

- Bryan Morgan on 2010 New Year Honours
- Bryan Morgan (screenwriter) of Rookies (film)

== See also ==
- Brian Morgan (disambiguation)
