= All at Sea (1929 film) =

1929 film

All At Sea
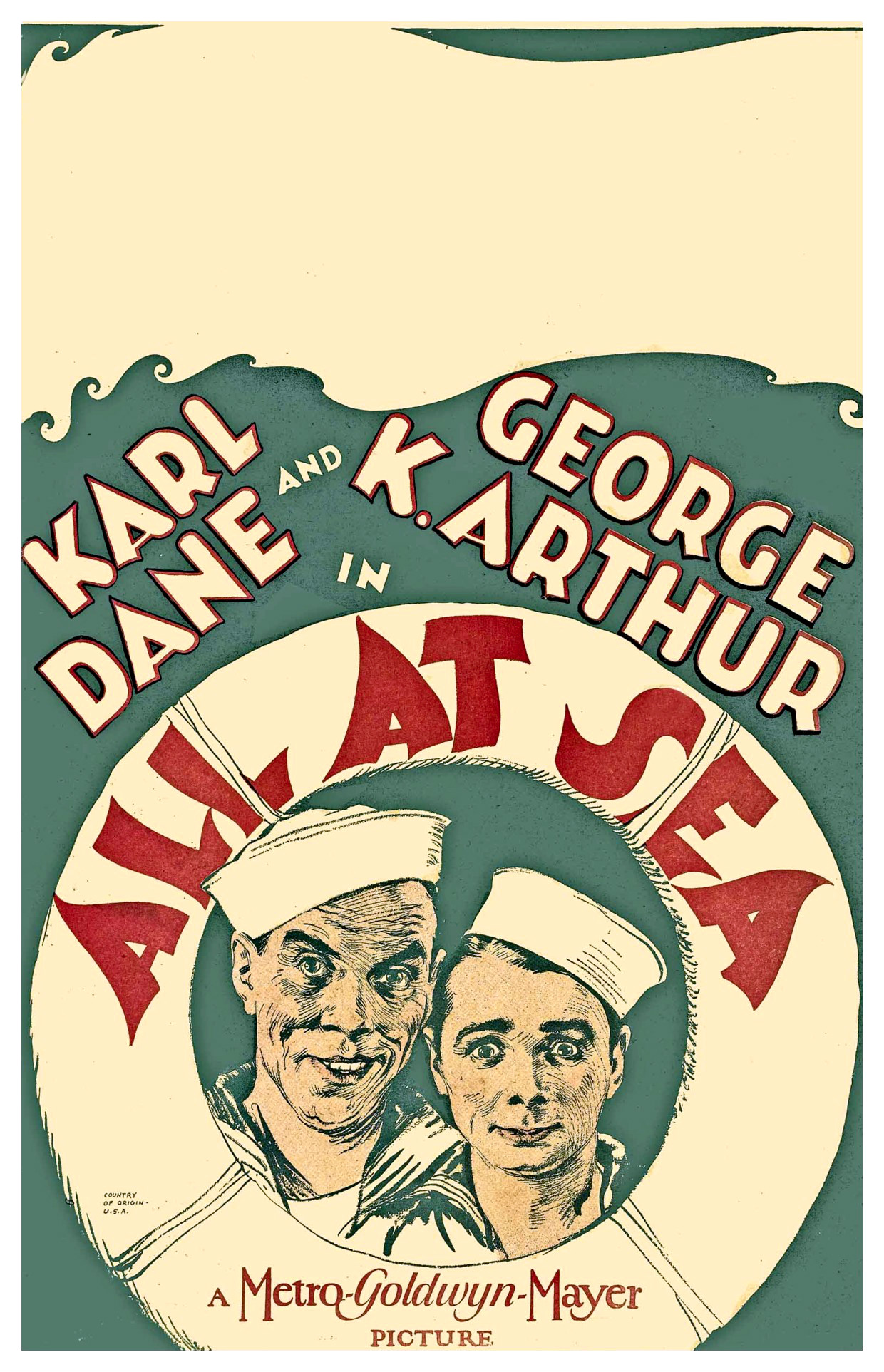
- Film poster
- Directed by: Alfred J. Goulding
- Written by: Ann Price; Robert E. Hopkins (intertitles)
- Screenplay by: Byron Morgan
- Story by: Byron Morgan
- Produced by: Metro Goldwyn Mayer
- Starring: Karl Dane; George K. Arthur
- Cinematography: Arthur Reed
- Edited by: Basil Wrangell
- Distributed by: Metro-Goldwyn-Mayer
- Release date: February 9, 1929
- Running time: 59 minutes
- Country: USA

All At Sea is a 1929 American silent comedy film starring Karl Dane and George K. Arthur. It was produced and distributed by MGM and directed by Alfred J. Goulding.

The film survives incomplete.

== Cast ==
- Karl Dane - Stupid McDuff
- George K. Arthur - Rollo the Great
- Josephine Dunn - Shirley Page
- Herbert Prior - Mr. Page
- Eddie Baker - The Marine
