= Baby Mine (play) =

1910 farce comedy play by Margaret Mayo

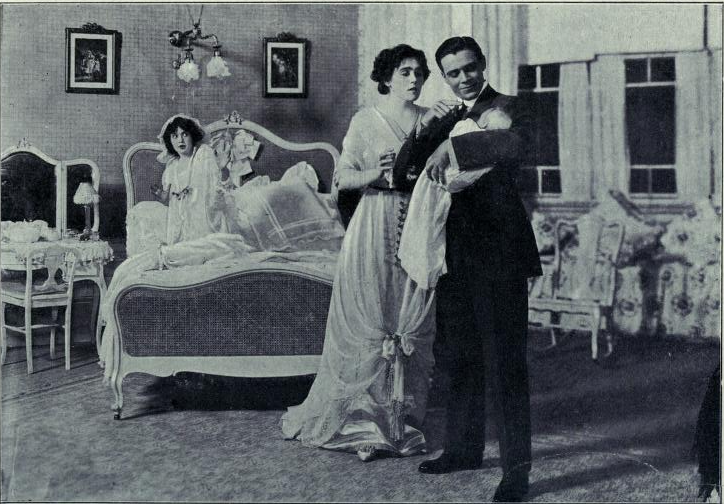
Marguerite Clark, Ivy Troutman, and Ernest Glendinning in New York production.

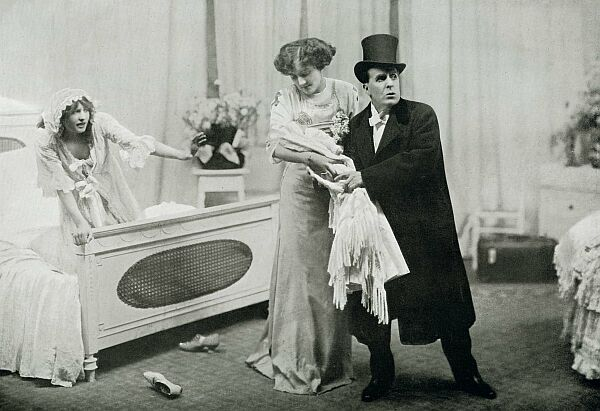
Iris Hoey, Lilias Waldegrave and Weedon Grossmith in the London production of Baby Mine (1911).

Baby Mine is a farce comedy play in three acts by Margaret Mayo that made its Broadway debut at Daly's Theatre on August 23, 1910. The piece was produced by William A. Brady and remained at Daly's for nearly an entire season. Closing on April 1, 1911, Baby Mine then transferred to Brooklyn's Majestic Theatre for a three-week run which was followed by a brief stand at the Lyric Theatre in Manhattan before closing with a combined total from all three venues of 227 performances.

Mayo's comedy was made into two silent films, Baby Mine (1917), Madge Kennedy's debut film, and Baby Mine (1928), starring Charlotte Greenwood, Karl Dane and George K. Arthur. Mon bébé, a July 10, 1967, episode of The French television series Au théâtre ce soir was based on Mayo's play.

== Cast ==
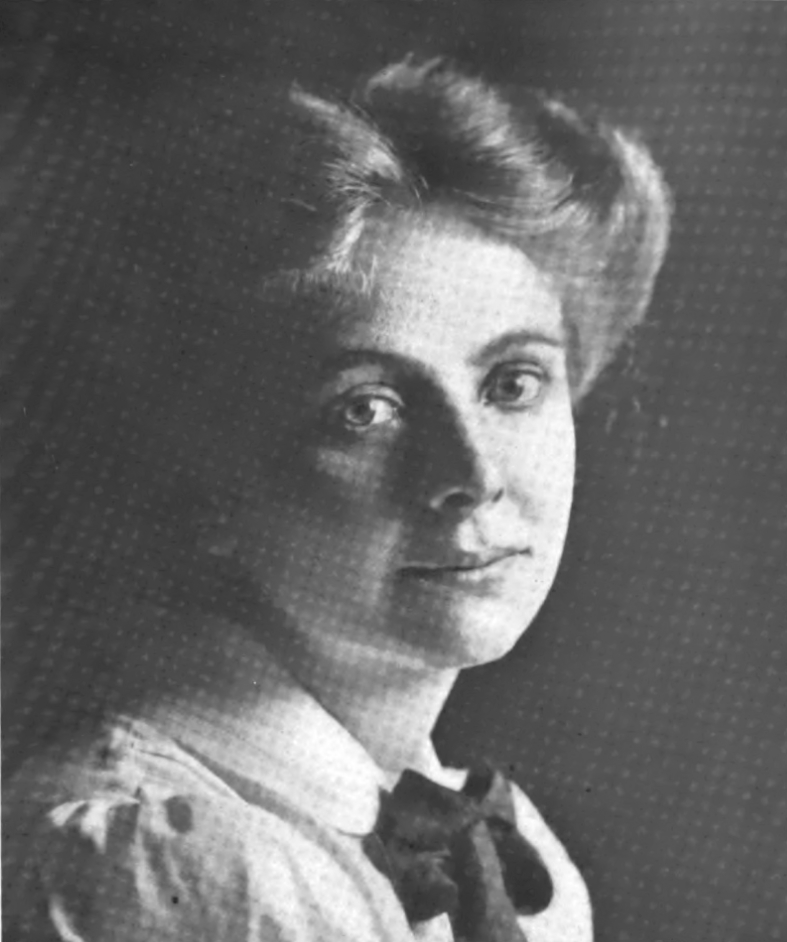
Margaret Mayo (1882-1951)

- Rosa Gatti ... Sara Biala
- Zoie Hardy... Marguerite Clark
- Finningan ... E. D. Cromwell
- Maggie O'Flarety ... Ruth Findlay
- Alfred Hardy ... Ernest Glendinning
- Donaghey ... Harry H. Hart
- Jimmy Jinks ... Walter Jones
- Michael O'Flarety ... John E. Mackin
- Aggie Jinks ... Ivy Troutman
- Source: Theatre Magazine, October 1910

== Story ==
Baby Mine is a farce comedy about young newlyweds, Zoie and Alfred Hardy, who have separated after months of bickering. One issue that divides the couple is children—Alfred was eager to be a parent, Zoie less so. After several months apart pass, Zoie consults her friend Aggie on how she could lure her estranged husband back. Aggie suggests she procure an unwanted baby and tell her husband that the foundling is theirs. Jimmy Jinks, Aggie's husband, locates a desperate mother willing to give up her newborn and soon word is sent to Alfred. The ploy begins to unravel though when shortly before Alfred is due to return, overjoyed with the news, the baby's mother has a change of heart. A scramble ensues to find another child before Alfred's homecoming.

== Reception ==
Gynecology has never figured as a popular dramatic thesis. James A. Herne once made partial use of it in "Margaret Fleming," and some critics, including W. D. Howells, put it down as one of the greatest plays ever written, while others declared it insultingly indecent. Margaret Mayo, with refreshing candor coupled with much common sense and a nice appreciation of "the limit," has dramatized a problem in obstetrics, which is making the walls of Daly's Theatre nightly resound with howls of unlimited merriment. It is in three acts, and is called "Baby Mine." It was a happy touch on the part of the author to make her central figures a very young married couple, as their ingenuous simplicity made it possible to gloss over situations that otherwise would have appeared somewhat raw. Theatre Magazine, October, 1910

The real theme' of " Baby Mine" is tragic, not comic, and this background makes it all the funnier. It is purely a matter of treatment. The idea of a husband devotedly attached to a very frivolous, scatterbrained, wholly irresponsible but fascinating wife, who is an habitual and outrageous liar, and who is also very deeply in love with him, is surely not humorous. Nor is there anything funny in the young husband's passionate longing for children and the young wife's hatred of them.

But the author ignores the tragedy and makes the situation a mere Titanic joke. When the wife's conduct drives the husband from home, she acts upon 2. Solomon of a suggestion to bring him back—nothing less than to tell him he is a father. To carry out the deception, she decides to get an infant from a hospital. Miss Mayo frankly announces that the notion for the farce came to her from a newspaper clipping which said that there are, in Chicago, three thousand husbands devotedly fondling adopted babies that they imagine are their own. Aggie, the best friend of the young wife, conceived the scheme, and her husband, Jimmy Jinks, is called upon to provide the baby—in fact, to provide three of them, because of most amazing, yet apparently natural, mix-ups.

The action is so fast, the situations follow each other so quickly, so logically, and they are so screamingly funny, that one hasn't time to think. There seems to be no limit to the author's ingenuity in inventing situations that are a constant series of surprises. Moreover, she has kept her play absolutely clean. Often it is near the danger line—naturally enough, with such a theme—but she has resisted temptations against which no French or German dramatist would have been proof. Everybody's Magazine, July 1910

1927 Revival

On June 9, 1927 a revival of "Baby Mine" was produced at Chavin's Forty-Sixth Street Theatre, starring Roscoe "Fatty" Arbuckle in the role of Jimmy Jenks. Arbuckle received a long ovation from the audience - but the review was tepid and the run lasted only twelve performances. Joining Arbuckle on stage were Lee Patrick in the role of Zoie Hardy and Humphrey Bogart as her estranged husband, Alfred Hardy.
