= Spring Fever (1919 film) =

1919 film

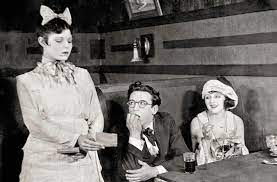
- Directed by: Hal Roach
- Produced by: Hal Roach
- Starring: Harold Lloyd; Snub Pollard; Bebe Daniels; George K. Arthur
- Cinematography: Fred Guiol
- Release date: June 29, 1919
- Running time: 10 minutes
- Country: United States
- Language: Silent with English intertitles

Spring Fever is a 1919 American silent comedy short film directed by Hal Roach and starring Harold Lloyd.

== Plot ==
Harold is an office worker whose mind wanders from his mundane clerical tasks due to the lovely weather. Unable to resist the pull of a park on a beautiful spring day, Harold abandons his job. He is pursued into the park by annoyed office colleagues and his boss. Harold's playful antics in the park quickly annoy several people, causing a large mob to start chasing him. While hiding in some shrubbery, Harold encounters Bebe who herself is hiding from an unwanted suitor (Snub). The mob attacks Snub, mistakenly believing him to be Harold. Bebe and Harold quietly escape to an ice cream parlor where Harold has insufficient money to pay for their treats. Harold attempts a few creative tricks to avoid paying the bill. In the end, Harold deceives the waitress into thinking that a still groggy Snub has agreed to pay his tab. The film ends in Bebe's garden, where Harold and Bebe embrace as a new couple.

== Cast ==
- Harold Lloyd as The Boy
- Snub Pollard as The Unwelcome Suitor (as Harry Pollard)
- Bebe Daniels as The Girl
- George K. Arthur
- Ray Brooks
- Sammy Brooks as Short man in the park
- Lige Conley - (as Lige Cromley)
- Wallace Howe
- Bud Jamison
- Mark Jones as Man on bench
- Dee Lampton as Fat man on bench
- Gus Leonard as The Boss
- Fred C. Newmeyer as Office worker/Old man with cane
- E.J. Ritter
- Charles Stevenson as Busy Bee counter man
- Noah Young as Office worker with large moustache

== Preservation status ==
Prints of the film exist in the film archives of the George Eastman Museum, UCLA Film & Television Archive, and the National Film Archive of the British Film Institute.
