= Circus Rookies =

1928 film by Edward Sedgwick

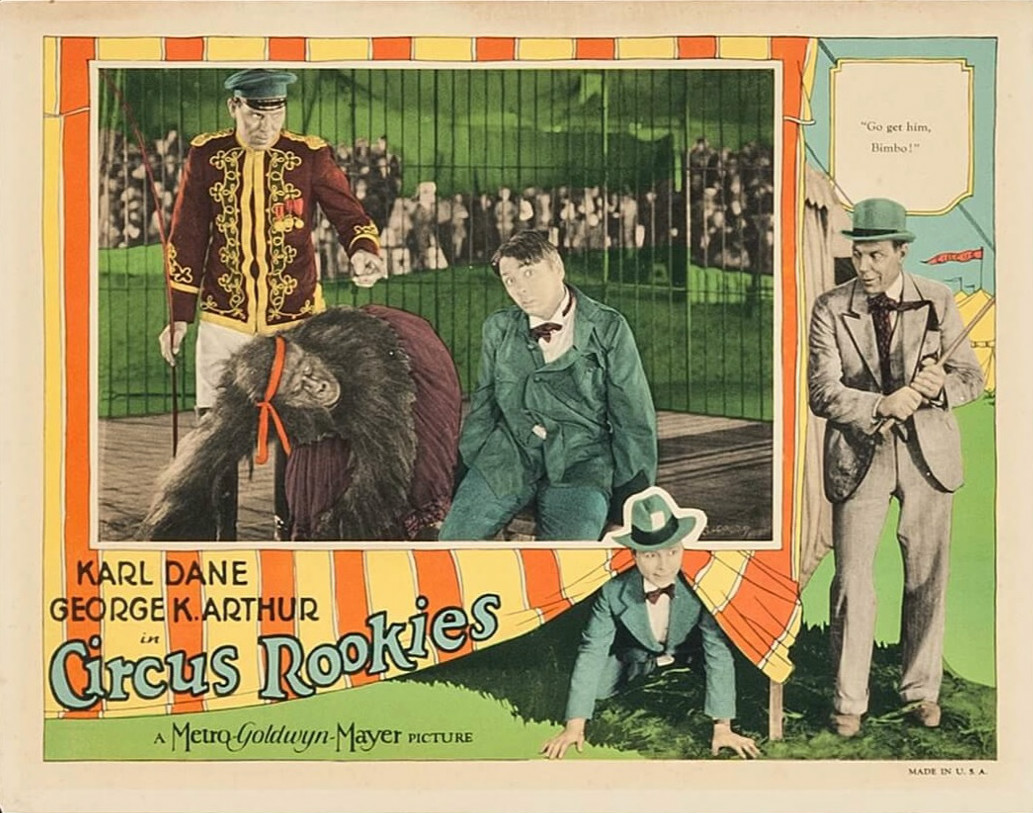
- Lobby card
- Directed by: Edward Sedgwick
- Written by: Lew Lipton (story); Edward Sedgwick (story); Richard Schayer (writer); Robert E. Hopkins (intertitles)
- Produced by: Louis B. Mayer; Irving Thalberg
- Starring: Karl Dane; George K. Arthur
- Cinematography: Merritt B. Gerstad
- Distributed by: Metro-Goldwyn-Mayer
- Release date: March 31, 1928
- Running time: 60 minutes; 6 reels (5,661 feet)
- Country: United States
- Language: Silent (English intertitles)

Circus Rookies is a lost 1928 American silent comedy film produced and distributed by MGM and directed by Edward Sedgwick. It starred the comedy team of Karl Dane and George K. Arthur.

== Cast ==
- Karl Dane as Oscar Thrust
- George K. Arthur as Francis Byrd
- Louise Lorraine as La Belle
- Sydney Jarvis as Mr. Magoo (credited as Sidney Jarvis)
- Fred Humes as Bimbo
- Lou Costello as Extra (uncredited)
