= Sweepstakes (film) =

1931 film directed by Albert S. Rogell

- Theatrical release poster
- Directed by: Albert S. Rogell
- Screenplay by: Lew Lipton
- Story by: Lew Lipton; Ralph Murphy
- Produced by: Charles R. Rogers; Harry Joe Brown (associate)
- Starring: Eddie Quillan; James Gleason; Marian Nixon; Lew Cody; Paul Hurst
- Cinematography: Edward Snyder
- Edited by: Joseph Kane
- Production company: RKO Pathé Pictures
- Distributed by: RKO Pictures
- Release dates: June 28, 1931 (New York City); July 10, 1931 (United States)
- Running time: 77 minutes
- Country: United States
- Language: English

Sweepstakes is a 1931 American pre-Code comedy film directed by Albert S. Rogell from a screenplay written by Lew Lipton and Ralph Murphy. The film stars Eddie Quillan, James Gleason, Marian Nixon, Lew Cody, and Paul Hurst, which centers around the travails and romances of jockey Buddy Doyle, known as the "Whoop-te-doo Kid" for his trademark yell during races. Produced by the newly formed RKO Pathé Pictures, this was the first film Charles R. Rogers would produce for the studio, after he replaced William LeBaron as head of production. The film was released on July 10, 1931, through RKO Radio Pictures.

== Plot ==
Bud Doyle is a jockey who has discovered the secret to get his favorite mount, Six-Shooter, to boost his performance. If he simply chants the phrase, "Whoop-te-doo", the horse responds with a burst of speed. There is a special bond between the jockey and his mount, but there is increasing tension between Doyle and the horse's owner, Pop Blake (who also raised Doyle), over Doyle's relationship with local singer Babe Ellis. Blake sees Ellis as a distraction prior to the upcoming big race, the Camden Stakes.

The owner of the club where Babe sings, Wally Weber, has his eyes on his horse winning the Camden Stakes. When the issues between Pop and Doyle come to a head, Pop tells Doyle that he has to choose: either he stops seeing Babe, or he'll be replaced as Six-Shooter's jockey in the big race. Angry and frustrated, Doyle quits. Weber approaches him to become the jockey for Rose Dawn, Weber's horse, and Doyle agrees, with the precondition that he not ride Royal Dawn in the Camden Stakes, for he wants Six-Shooter to still win the race. Weber accedes to that one precondition, however, on the day of the race, he makes it clear that Doyle is under contract, and that he will ride Rose Dawn in the race.

Upset, Doyle has no choice but to ride Rose Dawn. However, during the race, he manages to chant his signature "Whoop-te-doo" to Six-Shooter, causing his old mount to win the race. Furious that his horse lost, Weber goes to the judges, who rule that Doyle threw the race, pulling back on Rose Dawn, to allow Six-Shooter to win, and suspend Doyle from horse-racing.

Devastated, Doyle wanders from town to town, riding in small local races, until his identity is uncovered, and he is forced to move on. Soon, he is out of racing all together, and forced to taking one odd-job after another. Eventually, he ends up south of the border, in Tijuana, Mexico, working as a waiter. Doyle's friend, Sleepy Jones, hears of Doyle's plight. Jones gets the racing commission to lift the ban, by proving Doyle's innocence. He then, accompanied by Babe, gets a group to buy Six-Shooter from Pop, and they take the horse down to Tijuana, where there is another big race in the near future, the Tijuana Handicap.

Doyle is reluctant to ride at first, however, he is eventually cajoled into it by Sleepy and Babe, and of course, his bond with Six-Shooter is there. He rides the horse to victory, re-establishing his credentials as a rider. The film ends by jumping a few years into the future, which shows Doyle and Babe happily married, with a child of their own.

== Cast ==
(Cast list as per AFI database)

- Eddie Quillan as Bud Doyle
- Lew Cody as Wally Weber
- James Gleason as Sleepy Jones
- Marian Nixon as Babe Ellis
- King Baggot as Mike
- Paul Hurst as Cantina Bartender
- Clarence Wilson as Mr. Emory
- Frederick Burton as Pop Blake
- Billy Sullivan as Speed Martin
- Lillian Leighton as Ma Clancy
- Mike Donlin as The Dude

== Preservation ==
The film is preserved in the Library of Congress collection, in nitrate form.

== Critical response ==
Mordaunt Hall of The New York Times gave a very non-committal review of this film, with neither much praise or criticism. While he gave no indication of what he thought about the quality of the film, he enjoyed the performances of James Gleason and Lew Cody, and he called Quillan's performance as Doyle "original".

== See also ==
- List of films about horses
- List of films about horse racing
