= The Jazz Age (film) =

1929 film directed by Lynn Shores

The Jazz Age (1929)
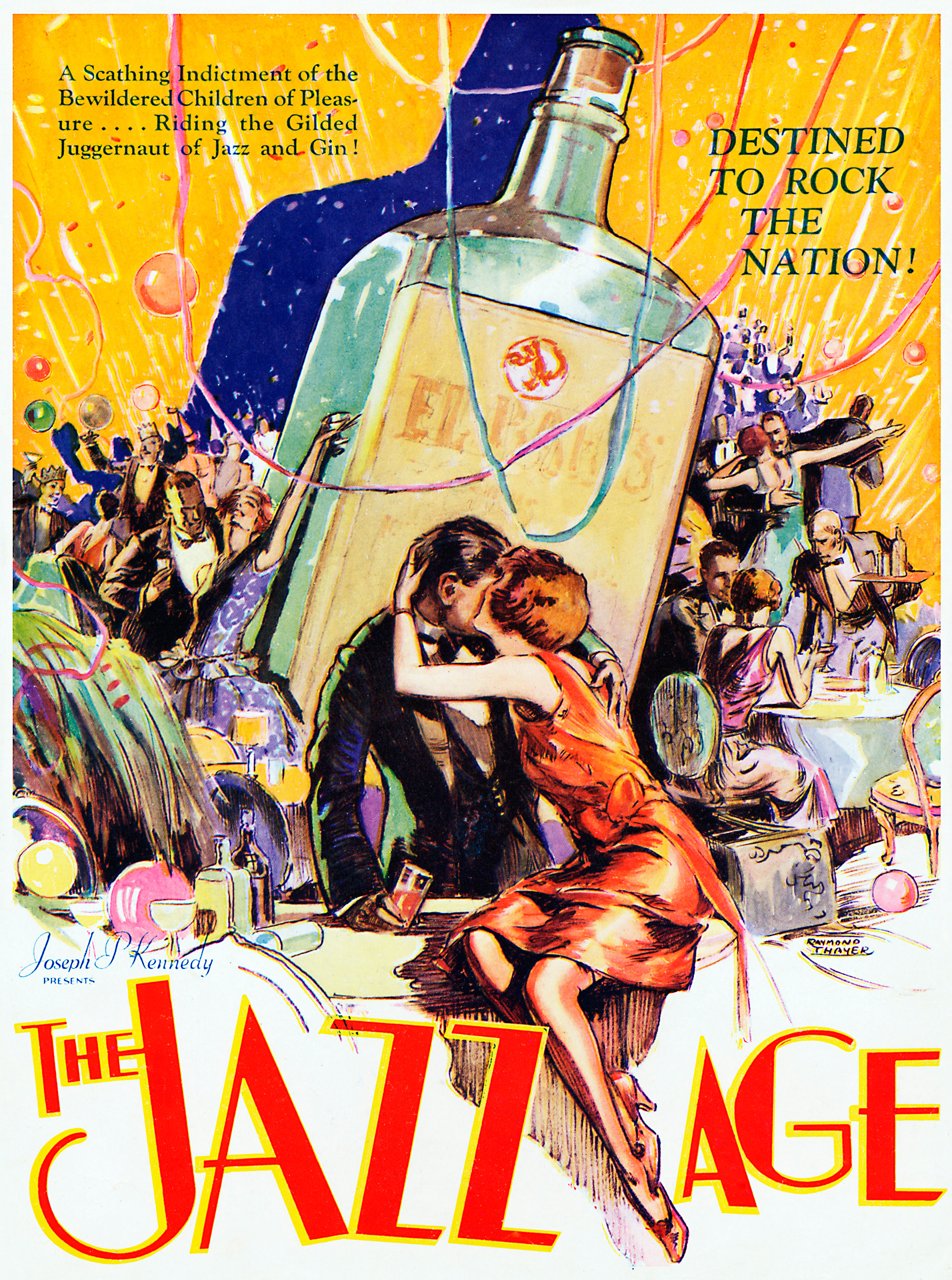
- Theatrical poster
- Directed by: Lynn Shores
- Written by: Paul Gangelin (script); Randolph Bartlett (intertitles)
- Produced by: Joseph P. Kennedy (presenter)
- Starring: Douglas Fairbanks Jr. Marceline Day; Henry B. Walthall; Joel McCrea
- Cinematography: Ted Pahle
- Edited by: Ann McKnight
- Music by: Josiah Zuro
- Production company: Film Booking Offices of America
- Distributed by: Film Booking Offices of America
- Release date: January 6, 1929 (U.S.)
- Running time: 64 minutes (7 reels; 6246 ft.)
- Country: United States
- Languages: Sound (Part-Talkie); English Intertitles

The Jazz Age is a 1929 American sound part-talkie romantic drama film starring Douglas Fairbanks Jr., Marceline Day, and Joel McCrea in his first leading role. In addition to sequences with audible dialogue or talking sequences, the film features a synchronized musical score and sound effects along with English intertitles. The film, directed by Lynn Shores and written by Randolph Bartlett, was released by RKO Radio Pictures soon after RKO was created from Film Booking Offices of America, RCA, and the Keith-Albee-Orpheum theater chain.

== Plot ==
Stephen “Steve” Maxwell, Jr. (Douglas Fairbanks Jr.) is the carefree son of attorney and city councilman Stephen Maxwell, Sr. (Henry B. Walthall), a respected citizen of modest means in Midland City. While Steve is just reaching manhood, his younger sister Marjorie Maxwell (Gertrude Messinger), a lively flapper of sixteen, has begun to run with a “wild” set of youngsters.

Steve himself belongs to a similar fast crowd, but he disapproves of his sister’s recklessness and tries to steer her away from the same influences that lure him.

Charles Randall (E. J. Ratcliffe), the city’s political and financial boss, controls Midland City through money and influence. His daughter Sue Randall (Marceline Day), bright and willful, is part of the same privileged social set Steve longs to keep up with. Steve is especially drawn to Sue, though his family’s modest means put him at a disadvantage against her wealthy circle.

Steve’s efforts to match their expensive habits begin to drain the family’s resources. His father worries silently, while Mrs. Maxwell (Myrtle Stedman) tries to keep peace in the household.

One night, on a dare, Steve and Sue “borrow” a one-man streetcar from a sleeping motorman and set off on a wild joyride through the city. The reckless stunt ends in disaster when the car careens out of control and crashes. A motorcycle policeman (Edgar Dearing) pursues them, but in the struggle Steve knocks him down before the pair make their escape.

The irony is bitter: the streetcar belongs to Randall himself, who owns the town’s traction system. Humiliated and enraged, Randall vows to prosecute the guilty party to the full extent of the law.

Meanwhile, in the city council, Maxwell Sr. stands firmly against Randall’s attempt to push through a corrupt paving contract. Randall tries bribery, offering Maxwell a $25,000 legal position on his staff. Maxwell refuses with dignity, declaring he will not betray his city for personal gain.

But Steve, overhearing his father’s refusal, cannot understand. He is indignant that his father would spurn such wealth, especially when Steve is struggling to keep pace socially.

Randall learns from the motor cop that Steve was responsible for the streetcar outrage. He seizes the opportunity, threatening Maxwell Sr.: unless he votes in favor of the paving contract, his son will face prison. Mrs. Maxwell, terrified for Steve, pleads with her husband to relent, but the elder Maxwell refuses to compromise his principles.

On the night of the decisive council meeting, Steve and Sue discover Randall’s plot from Mrs. Maxwell. Determined to save his father, Steve rushes with Sue to the meeting. Again pursued by the motorcycle officer from the streetcar episode, they manage to shake him off when his bike overturns.

Bursting into the council chamber, Steve publicly confronts Randall. With the entire assembly watching, he dares Randall to send him to jail and exposes his threats of blackmail against his father. The chamber erupts in uproar.

Randall, furious, demands Steve’s arrest unless he retracts his accusation. At that moment, Sue rises to defend Steve. She declares that she was equally guilty in the streetcar affair and warns her father that if Steve is prosecuted, she must share his punishment. Then, with cool defiance, she adds that it would hardly suit Randall’s lofty dignity to have a “jailbird” for a son-in-law.

Her words cut through Randall’s bluster. The balance of power shifts. Steve and Sue’s act of courage exposes Randall’s corruption, vindicates Maxwell Sr., and clears the way for a romance between the reformer’s son and the boss’s daughter.

== Cast ==
- Douglas Fairbanks Jr. as Steve Maxwell
- Marceline Day as Sue Randall
- Henry B. Walthall as Mr. Maxwell (billed as H. B. Walthall)
- Myrtle Stedman as Mrs. Maxwell
- Gertrude Messinger as Marjorie
- Joel McCrea as Todd Sayles
- William Bechtel as Mr. Sayles
- E. J. Ratcliffe as Mr. Randall
- Ione Holmes as Ellen McBride
- Edgar Dearing as Motor Cop

== Production background ==
Like the majority of early sound films, RKO released The Jazz Age in a cut-down edited silent version for those theatres not yet equipped for sound. The sound part-talkie version was recorded using the RCA Photophone sound system.

There was a later documentary film produced by NBC News Project 20, narrated by Fred Allen also titled The Jazz Age (1956), and a 15-episode TV series of the same name on the BBC (1968). Both the IMDB and TCM websites, for the 1929 film, show the 1956 film as available on DVD for purchase. No information is given about the availability of the 1929 title.

== Censorship ==
When The Jazz Age was released, many states and cities in the United States had censor boards that could require cuts or other eliminations before the film could be shown. The Kansas censor board ordered the elimination of a view of a bruised spot on a young woman's knee.

== Preservation ==
The film is preserved in the Library of Congress collection Packard Campus for Audio-Visual Conservation.

== See also ==
- List of early sound feature films (1926–1929)
