= Sylvia Thalberg =

American screenwriter

- Born: August 26, 1907; Brooklyn, New York, U.S.
- Died: April 9, 1988 (aged 80); New York City, New York, U.S.
- Occupation: Screenwriter
- Spouses: Lawrence Weingarten (m. 1928; div. 1943): Paul Streeger
- Relatives: Irving Thalberg (brother)

Sylvia Thalberg (August 26, 1907 – April 9, 1988) was an American screenwriter. Her brother was film producer Irving Thalberg.

== Biography ==
=== Origins ===
Sylvia was born in Brooklyn, New York, to German-Jewish immigrant parents. She had one brother, Irving, who would grow up to be a famous producer at MGM. She spent most of her early life in Brooklyn before joining her brother in Los Angeles in the late 1920s.

=== Hollywood career ===
By 1927, she had begun writing scenarios for Metro-Goldwyn-Mayer, and was noted as the youngest member of the studio's writing staff. Some of her earliest screenplays included Lovers? and Baby Mine, both of which were hits with audiences.

With the release of 1930's Montana Moon, she and co-writer Frank Butler were noted as the only screenwriters at the time who had prepared the original story, adaptation, continuity and dialogue for a sound film. She and Butler collaborated on a number of scripts together.

In 1933, she resigned her position at MGM aiming to spend her time writing novels. At the time, she had tired of being accused of benefiting from her brother's position, and her novel, Too Beautiful, had been accepted for publication. She wasn't gone from the business long, however; later that year, she was signed to co-write a script at Paramount and later officially joined its staff.

In 1944, she signed a new writing contract at the Producers Corporation of America, where it was announced she was writing a remake of The Greeks Had a Word for It. The film was never made.

=== Personal life ===
In 1928, she married Lawrence Weingarten, a producer at MGM. The marriage ended in divorce in 1943. She later married Paul Streeger, and they remained married until his death.

== Selected filmography ==
- As Good as Married (1937)
- A Son Comes Home (1936)
- Now and Forever (1934)
- Christopher Bean (1933)
- Prosperity (1932)
- When a Feller Needs a Friend (1932)
- This Modern Age (1931)
- New Moon (1930)
- Those Three French Girls (1930)
- Montana Moon (1930)
- Untamed (1928)
- China Bound (1929)
- Baby Mine (1928)
- Lovers? (1927)
