= Tin Hats =

1926 film by Edward Sedgwick

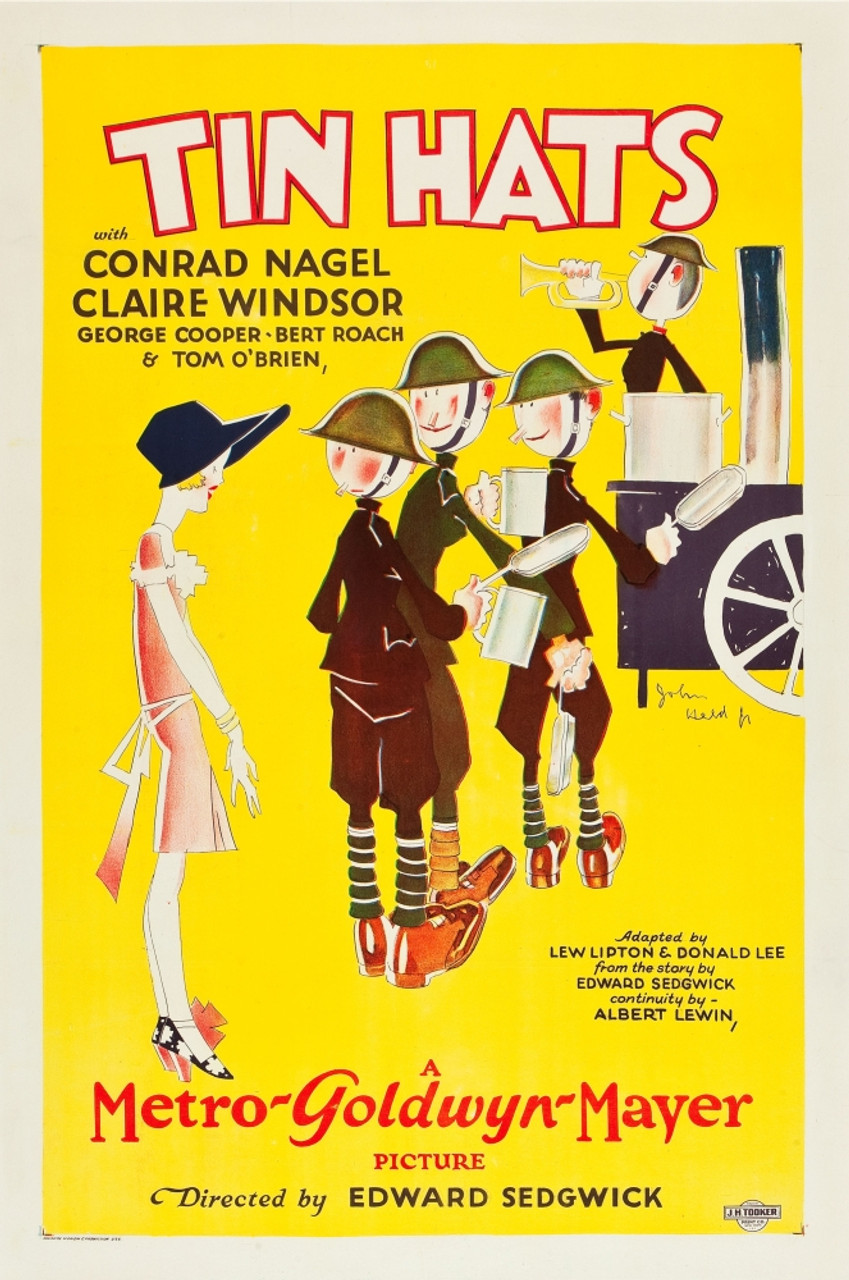
- Directed by: Edward Sedgwick
- Written by: Lew Lipton; Donald W. Lee; Edward Sedgwick; Albert E. Lewin
- Starring: Claire Windsor; Bert Roach; Conrad Nagel
- Cinematography: Ben F. Reynolds
- Distributed by: Metro-Goldwyn-Mayer
- Release date: November 28, 1926
- Running time: 70 minutes
- Country: United States
- Language: Silent (English intertitles)

Tin Hats is a 1926 American silent comedy film directed by Edward Sedgwick (his first for MGM), starring Claire Windsor and Conrad Nagel. The film is considered partially lost.

== Plot ==
Three United States soldiers (Conrad Nagel, George Cooper and Tom O'Brien) are lost in the Rhineland on Armistice Day and accepted as conquering overlords by a village... except for Lady Bountiful (Claire Windsor).

== Cast ==
- Conrad Nagel as Jack Benson
- Claire Windsor as Elsa von Bergen
- George Cooper as 'Lefty' Mooney
- Bert Roach as 'Dutch' Krausmeyer
- Tom O'Brien as Sergeant McGurk
- Eileen Sedgwick as Freida
