= Detectives (1928 film) =

1928 film

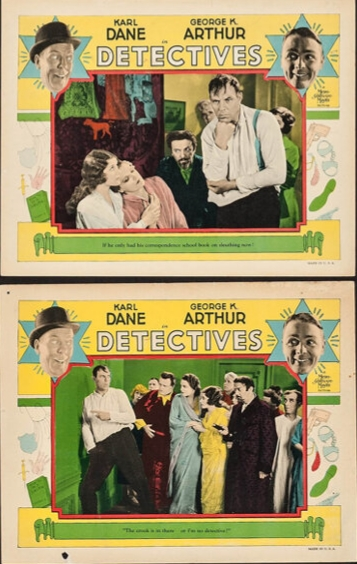
- Lobby cards of the film
- Directed by: Chester M. Franklin
- Written by: Chester Franklin (story, scenario); Robert Lord (story, scenario)
- Produced by: Louis B. Mayer
- Starring: Karl Dane; George K. Arthur
- Cinematography: John Arnold
- Edited by: Frank Sullivan
- Distributed by: Metro-Goldwyn-Mayer
- Release date: June 9, 1928
- Running time: 7 reels
- Country: United States
- Language: Silent (English intertitles)

Detectives is a 1928 silent film mystery comedy produced and distributed by Metro-Goldwyn-Mayer. It was directed by Chester Franklin with elements of the old-house melodrama genre. The film is another outing for Karl Dane, George K. Arthur and Marceline Day.

The film is preserved by MGM. A trailer is preserved in the Library of Congress collection.

Clips from the film appeared in Robert Youngson's MGM's Big Parade of Comedy in 1965. One scene has George K. Arthur disappearing while within the hanging covers of a large canopy bed.

== Cast ==
- Karl Dane as The House Detective
- George K. Arthur as The Bellhop
- Marceline Day as Lois
- Tenen Holtz as Orloff
- Felecia Drenova as Mrs. Winters
- Tetsu Komai as Chin Lee
- Clinton Lyle as Roberts
