= Marceline Day =

American actress (1908–2000)

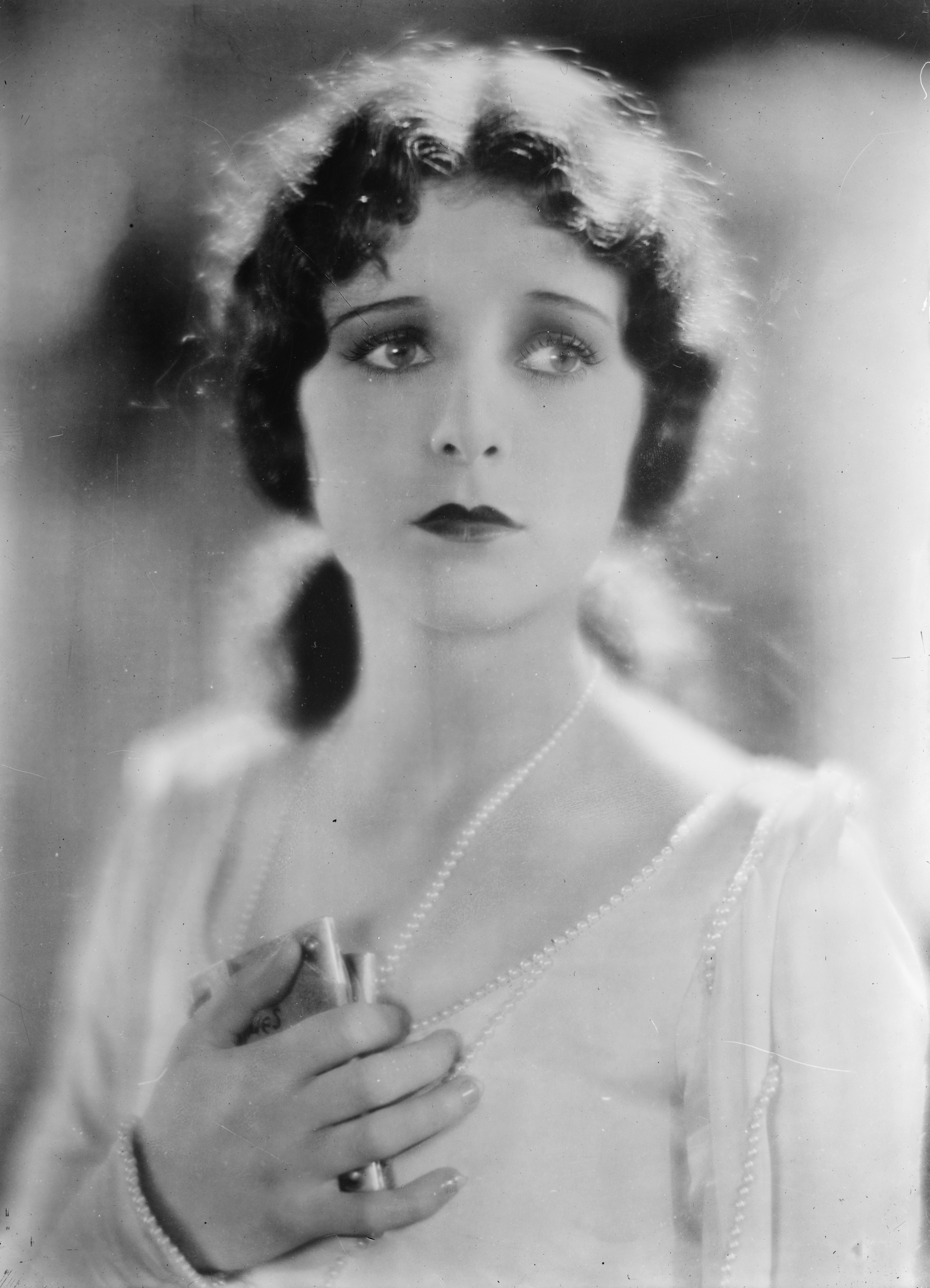
- Day in 1926
- Born: Marceline Newlin; April 24, 1908; Colorado Springs, Colorado, U.S.
- Died: February 16, 2000 (aged 91); Cathedral City, California, U.S.
- Occupation: Actress
- Years active: 1924–1933
- Spouses: Arthur J. Klein (m. 1930, divorced) John Arthur (m. 1959; died 1980)
- Relatives: Alice Day (sister)

Marceline Day (born Marceline Newlin; April 24, 1908 – February 16, 2000) was an American motion picture actress whose career began as a child in the 1910s and ended in the 1930s.

== Early life ==
Marceline Newlin was born in Colorado Springs, Colorado and raised in Salt Lake City, Utah, the daughter of Frank and Irene Newlin and the younger sister of film actress Alice Day. She attended Venice High School.

== Career ==
Day began her film career after her sister Alice Day became a featured actress as one of the Sennett Bathing Beauties in one and two-reel comedies for Keystone Studios. Day made her first film appearance with her sister in the 1924 Mack Sennett comedy Picking Peaches before being cast in a string of comedy shorts opposite actor Harry Langdon and a stint in early Hollywood Westerns opposite such silent film cowboy stars as Hoot Gibson, Art Acord and Jack Hoxie. Gradually, Day began appearing in more dramatic roles opposite such esteemed actors of the era as Lionel Barrymore, John Barrymore, Norman Kerry, Ramón Novarro and Lon Chaney, as well as comedy legend Buster Keaton.

In 1926, Day was named one of the 13 WAMPAS Baby Stars, a promotional campaign sponsored by the Western Association of Motion Picture Advertisers in the United States, which honored 13 young women each year who they believed to be on the threshold of movie stardom. Other notable recipients that year were Joan Crawford, Mary Astor, Janet Gaynor, and Dolores del Río. The publicity from the campaign added to Day's popularity, and in 1927, she appeared opposite John Barrymore in the romantic adventure The Beloved Rogue.

Day is probably best recalled for her appearances in the now lost 1927 horror classic London After Midnight directed by Tod Browning with Lon Chaney and Conrad Nagel, her role as Sally Richards in the 1928 comedy The Cameraman with Buster Keaton, and the 1929 drama The Jazz Age with Douglas Fairbanks Jr. By the late 1920s, Day's career had eclipsed the career of her sister Alice, who also was a popular actress. The two would appear together onscreen again in the 1929 musical The Show of Shows.

She married furrier Arthur J. Klein in 1930. She was married for a second time in 1959 to John Arthur until his death on April 2, 1980. She had no children with either husband.

Although Day transitioned into sound films with little problem, her film roles gradually became lesser in quality, and she began working primarily for lower-rung film studios. By 1933, Day made the transition back to the Western genre, appearing in "B" Westerns starring Tim McCoy, Hoot Gibson, Ken Maynard, Jack Hoxie, and John Wayne. Her last film was The Fighting Parson with Gibson. After her retirement, Day rarely spoke of her years as an actress and never spoke to reporters or granted interviews.

== Death ==
On February 16, 2000, Day was found dead in her kitchen, in her Cathedral City, California home at the age of 91. She was cremated.

== Filmography ==
=== Features ===
Year	Title	Role	Note
1925	The Splendid Road	Lilian Grey	Lost film
1925	The Wall Street Whiz	Peggy McCooey	
1925	The White Outlaw	Mary Gary	
1925	Renegade Holmes, M.D.	Marie Darnton	
1925	The Taming of the West	Beryl	Lost film
1926	College Days	Mary Ward	
1926	That Model from Paris	Jane Miller	
1926	Fools of Fashion	Mary Young	
1926	The Gay Deceiver	Louise de Tillois	Lost film
1926	The Boy Friend	Ida May Harper	Lost film
1926	Looking for Trouble	Tulip Hellier	Lost film
1926	The Barrier	Necia	Lost film
1926	Hell's Four Hundred	Barbara Langham	Lost film
1926	Western Pluck	Clare Dyer	Lost film
1927	London After Midnight	Lucille Balfour	Lost film
1927	The Road to Romance	Serafina	
1927	Captain Salvation	Mary Phillips	
1927	Rookies	Betty Wayne	
1927	Red Clay	Agnes Burr	Lost film
1927	The Beloved Rogue	Charlotte de Vauxcelles	
1928	Stolen Love	Joan Hastings	Lost film
1928	Restless Youth	Dixie	Lost film
1928	Freedom of the Press	June Westcott	
1928	Driftwood	Daisy Smith	Lost film
1928	The Cameraman	Sally	
1928	Detectives	Lois	
1928	A Certain Young Man	Phyllis	Lost film
1928	The Big City	Sunshine	Lost film
1928	Under the Black Eagle	Margarta	
1929	The Show of Shows	Performer in 'Meet My Sister' number	
1929	The One Woman Idea	Lady Alicia Douglas/Alizar, half-caste dancer	
1929	The Wild Party	Faith Morgan	
1929	Trent's Last Case	Evelyn Manderson	Incomplete film
1929	A Single Man	Maggie	Lost film
1929	The Jazz Age	Sue Randall	
1930	Hot Curves	Girl	
1930	Sunny Skies	Mary Norris	
1930	Temple Tower	Patricia Verney	
1930	Paradise Island	Ellen Bradford	
1931	The Pocatello Kid	Mary Larkin	
1931	The Mad Parade	Dorothy Quinlan	
1931	The Mystery Train	Joan Lane	
1931	Sky Raiders	Grace Devine	
1932	The Crusader	Marcia Brandon	
1932	The King Murder	Pearl Hope	
1932	Broadway to Cheyenne	Ruth Carter	
1932	The Arm of the Law	Sandy	
1932	The Fighting Fool	Judith	
1933	The Fighting Parson	Suzan Larkin	
1933	By Appointment Only	Miss Brown aka Brownie	
1933	The Flaming Signal	Molly James	
1933	Damaged Lives	Laura Hall	
1933	The Telegraph Trail	Alice Keller	
1933	Via Pony Express	Betty Castelar	

=== Shorts ===
Year	Title	Role	Note
1924	Feet of Mud		Short
1924	The Hansom Cabman	His Fiancee	Short
1924	The Luck o' the Foolish	His Wife	Short
1924	Black Oxfords	The Girl	Short
1924	Picking Peaches	Bathing Beauty	Short
1925	The Party		Short
1925	His New Suit	Mildred	Short
1925	Short Pants		Short
1925	Discord in 'A' Flat		Short
1925	Heart Trouble	Marceline	Short
