= Montana Moon =

1930 film

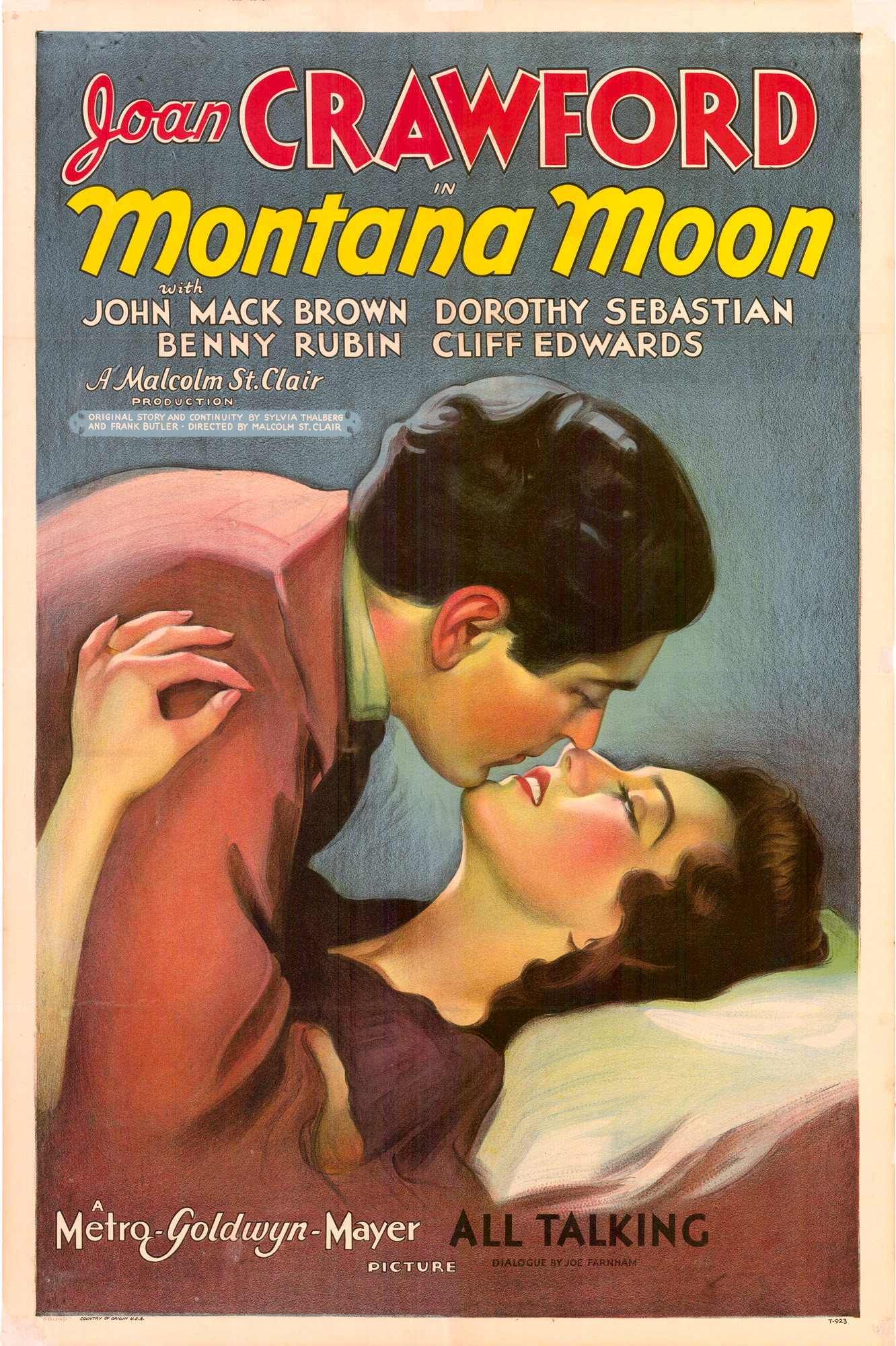
- Theatrical release poster
- Directed by: Malcolm St. Clair
- Written by: Sylvia Thalberg; Frank Butler; Dialogue: Joe Farnham
- Produced by: Malcolm St. Clair
- Starring: Joan Crawford; John Mack Brown; Dorothy Sebastian; Ricardo Cortez; Benny Rubin
- Cinematography: William H. Daniels
- Edited by: Carl Pierson; Leslie F. Wilder
- Music by: Arthur Freed; Nacio Herb Brown
- Distributed by: Metro-Goldwyn-Mayer
- Release date: March 20, 1930
- Running time: 89 minutes
- Country: United States
- Language: English
- Budget: $277,000
- Box office: $960,000

Montana Moon is a 1930 pre-Code Western musical film directed by Malcolm St. Clair which introduced the concept of the singing cowboy to the screen. Starring Joan Crawford, Johnny Mack Brown, Dorothy Sebastian, and Ricardo Cortez, the film focuses on the budding relationship between a city girl and a rural cowboy.

== Plot ==
Montana Moon (1930)

Joan Prescott is a vacuous and flirtatious daughter of the wealthy Montana rancher, John Prescott. On the train, Joan's sister, Elizabeth tells her she's in love with Jeff. Jeff is more smitten with Joan, and kisses her. Joan then impulsively gets off at the next whistle stop, where she meets Larry, a Texas cowboy. He is a rancher on John Prescott's land, and does not know who Joan is. He expresses dismay at how spoiled Prescott's daughters are. Joan conceals her identity, refusing to say her name. She tells him to think of something he loves and call her that, and he chooses "Montana".

Joan and Larry fall for one another, and are married. When they return to her father's ranch, the couple are nervous that he will not approve of the pairing. However, to their surprise, John Prescott is delighted for the couple, and believes that Larry is the kind of person who can finally settle Joan. At their party, celebrating their nuptials, Joan sees Jeff, with whom Joan does a daring dance. As they finish dancing, Joan and Jeff share a lingering kiss. After Jeff and Larry come to blows, Joan is embarrassed that Larry resorted to violence.

As Joan became familiar with Larry's posse of cowboy friends, she wants Larry to be accustomed to her group of highbrow city friends who are in Montana with John Prescott. She wants to go back to New York, where the couple can live comfortably, but Larry feels it is his duty as a husband to provide for his wife, and having her father take care of him is not an option.

Later at another party, Larry catches Jeff trying to make another move on Joan, and the married couple get into a fight. In a fit of rage, she tells Larry that marrying him was the greatest mistake of her life, and tells him to leave her alone. As he is walking away, she realizes her mistake and begs to be forgiven, but he rebuffs her. Even John Prescott advises him to forgive her, but Larry sees too many differences between the two to make the marriage work.

With the marriage over, and Larry refusing to speak to Joan, the Prescotts—Joan in tow—decide to take the train back to New York. En route, the train is held up by masked cowboys, who take Joan as their only hostage. However, the whole robbery is a ruse, and one of the masked cowboys is Larry, who has come to take Joan back to their new life.

== Cast ==
- Joan Crawford as Joan "Montana" Prescott
- Johnny Mack Brown as Larry Kerrigan
- Dorothy Sebastian as Elizabeth Prescott
- Benny Rubin as Dr Bloom
- Cliff Edwards as Froggy
- Ricardo Cortez as Jeffrey Pelham
- Karl Dane as Hank
- Lloyd Ingraham as John Prescott

Uncredited

- Mary Carlisle – Party Girl
- Claudia Dell – Froggy's Blonde
- Phil Dunham – Railroad Ticket Clerk
- Bud McClure – Cowboy at Party
- Pete Morrison – Cowboy at Party
- George H. Reed – Train Porter

== Production ==
As opposed to filming in Monument Valley or in California's Sierra Nevadas, director Malcolm St. Clair sent the cast to Montana for location shooting. The change in scenery and remoteness of the location helped create a strong sense of cohesion among the cast and crew, who spent most of their off hours together playing games and rehearsing scenes.

Because of delays in getting the script through the Production Code Administration, also known as the Hays office, the film was completed before any requisite changes were requested to get the film past Hollywood censors. By the time St. Clair got the lengthy list of cuts, it was too late to go back to Montana and re-shoot the necessary scenes. For instance, all shots of drinking be had to be eliminated since the country was still under Prohibition. This meant that both scenes from the wedding celebration in which people were shown drinking in the background and scenes in which Joan gets tipsy at her own wedding had to be cut. Unfortunately, those scenes explained Joan's flirtatious behavior with Jeff; so, instead of seeming innocently drunk, the character comes off as promiscuous.

Film historian Ruth Anne Dwyer considers the censoring of Montana Moon as "sabotage" and a harbinger of even more "extreme restrictions" that would be imposed on pictures when the Breen office took over censorship duties for Hollywood.

== Reception ==
Film critic Mordaunt Hall in the New York Times finds fault in the film's screenplay, its director Malcolm St. Clair, the quality of sound reproduction, and the acting. "It is a production that is equipped with poor dialogue and also one that is frequently lacking in good taste" from a director, Malcolm St. Clair, "whose work on silent films won him considerable distinction." The vocals from Joan Crawford lack "sound perspective" though "Miss Crawford appears to enjoy her rôle and sometimes her acting is quite fair."

Hall summarizes the Montana Moon "an interminable, amateurish talking picture, with spasmodic snatches of melody" with a plot "that most of the time takes itself only too seriously."
