= Lew Lipton =

American actor

- Born: February 23, 1897; Chicago, Illinois, United States
- Died: December 27, 1961 (aged 64); New York City, United States
- Occupations: Screenwriter, producer
- Years active: 1925–1939

Lew Lipton (February 23, 1897 – December 27, 1961), was an American screenwriter who was active during the latter part of the silent era and the beginning of the talking picture era. During his brief 15-year career, he penned the scripts for 24 films, as well as producing over 20 film shorts. In 1935, he began work on a script entitled Harlem Cavalcade. He authored another half-dozen films during the remaining years of the 1930s, before devoting his efforts full-time to this manuscript. Harlem Cavalcade was an epic story of life among Black-Americans, beginning with their relationship to the Dutch community of New Amsterdam in 1626, through 1938. A series of vignettes, it incorporated the real-life stories of such notable Americans as Booker T. Washington, Frederick Douglas, George Washington Carver, Joe Lewis, Satchel Paige, and Cab Calloway. Lipton worked on the script right up until his death in 1961. Lipton died on December 27, 1961.

== Filmography ==
(Per AFI database)

- Bright Lights (1925)
- The White Desert (1925)
- Tin Hats (1926)
- Frisco Sally Levy (1927)
- In Old Kentucky (1927)
- The Cameraman (1928)
- Baby Mine (1928)
- Brotherly Love (1928)
- Circus Rookies (1928)
- Honeymoon (1928)
- Spite Marriage (1929)
- A Man from Wyoming (1930)
- The Cohens and Kellys in Africa (1931)
- Sweepstakes (1931)
- Suicide Fleet (1931)
- Hold 'Em Jail (1932)
- So This Is Africa (1933)
- The Perfect Gentleman (1935)
- It's in the Air (1935)
- Mummy's Boys (1936)
- Follow the Fleet (1936)
- Ready, Willing and Able (1937)
- You Can't Cheat an Honest Man (1939)
- Broadway Serenade (1939)
