= Lights of Old Broadway =

1925 film

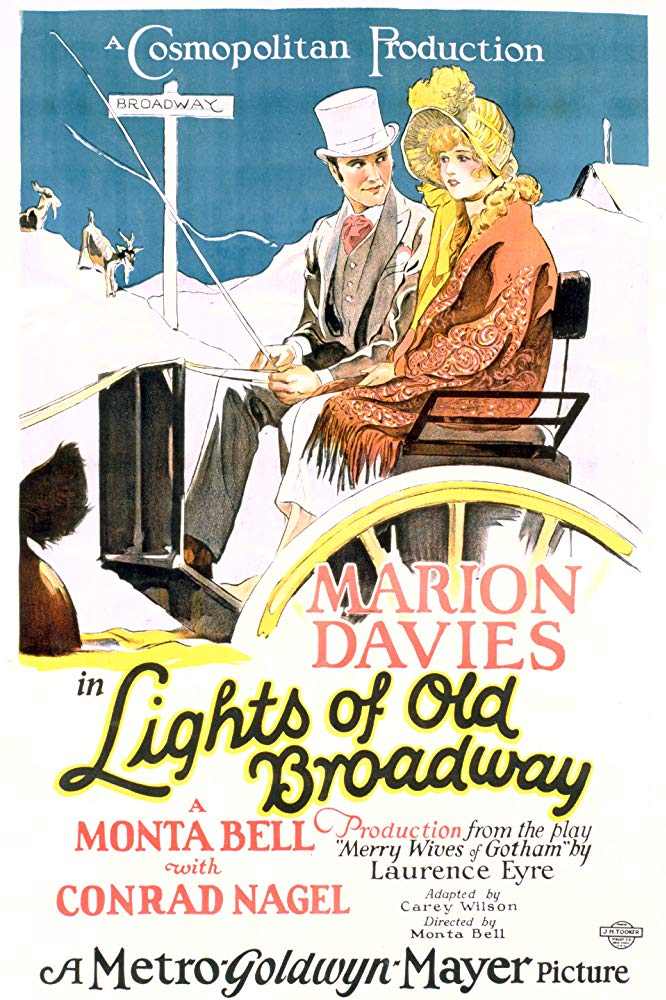
- Theatrical poster
- Directed by: Monta Bell
- Written by: Carey Wilson (adaptation & scenario); Joseph Farnham (intertitles)
- Based on: The Merry Wives of Gotham by Laurence Eyre
- Produced by: Cosmopolitan Productions
- Starring: Marion Davies; Conrad Nagel
- Cinematography: Ira H. Morgan
- Edited by: Blanche Sewell
- Distributed by: Metro-Goldwyn-Mayer
- Release date: November 1925
- Running time: 70 minutes
- Country: United States
- Language: Silent (English intertitles)

Lights of Old Broadway (1925) by Monta Bell

Lights of Old Broadway is a 1925 American silent drama film directed by Monta Bell, produced by William Randolph Hearst's Cosmopolitan Productions, and released by Metro-Goldwyn-Mayer. The film stars Marion Davies in a dual role and Conrad Nagel, and is an adaptation of the play The Merry Wives of Gotham by Laurence Eyre (USA). The film has color sequences using tinting, Technicolor, and the Handschiegl color process.

The play was produced on Broadway at Henry Miller's Theatre from January 16, 1924 to April 1924. Davies' role was played on the stage by actress Mary Ellis.

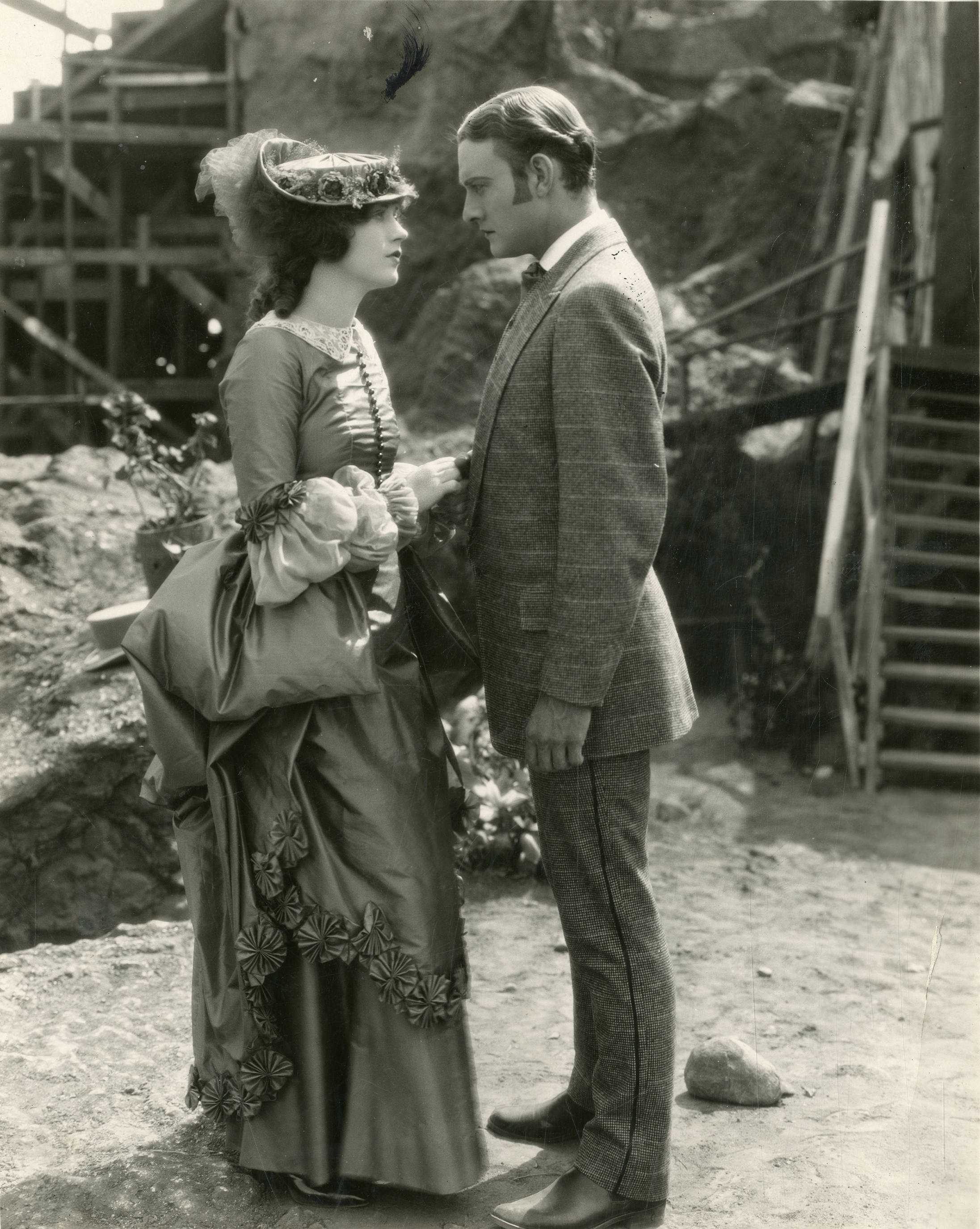
Lights of Old Broadway film still.

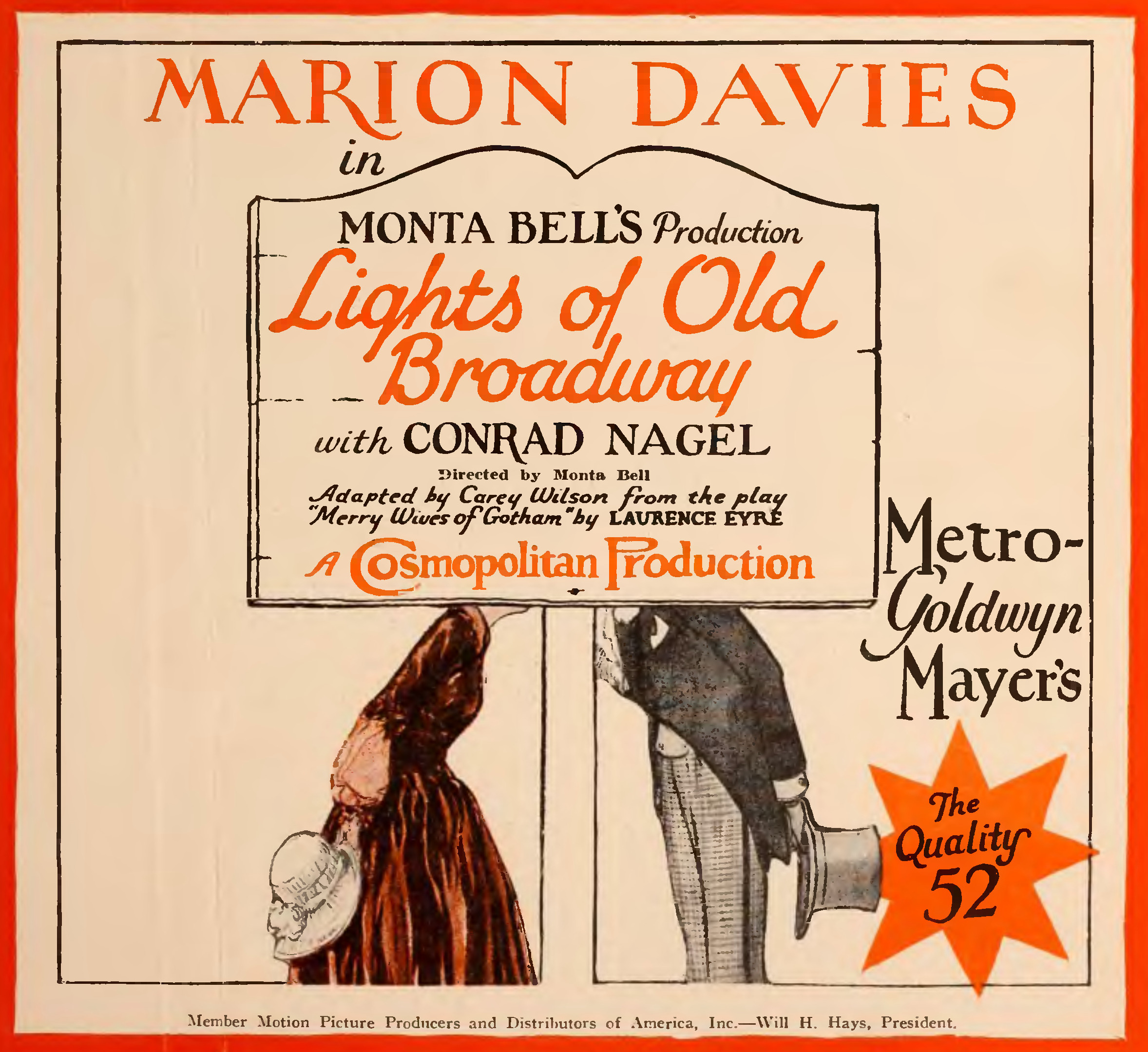
Advertisement from Motion Picture News, 1925

== Plot ==
As described in a film magazine review, two young women, twins, whose mother dies while the family is en route from Ireland to the United States, are separated in New York City, Anne being adopted by a wealthy family and the other, Fely, by a poor family. Dirk, Anne's adopted brother, meets the poor sister, and love draws them together. The youth’s family objects to his romance, but are reconciled when the poor sister saves Dirk’s father from death, and the two are then wed. A subplot involves the coming of electricity to New York City.

== Cast ==
- Marion Davies as Fely / Anne
- Conrad Nagel as Dirk de Rhonde
- Frank Currier as Lambert de Rhonde
- George K. Arthur as Andy
- Charles McHugh as Shamus O'Tandy
- Eleanor Lawson as Mrs. O'Tandy
- Julia Swayne Gordon as Mrs. de Rhonde
- Matthew Betz as Red Hawkins
- Wilbur Higby as Fowler
- Bodil Rosing as Widow Gorman
- George Bunny as Tony Pastor
- George Harris as Joe Weber
- Bernard Berger as Lew Fields
- J. Frank Glendon as Thomas A. Edison (credited as Frank Glendon)
- Buck Black as Young Teddy Roosevelt
- Karl Dane as Roosevelt's Father
- William De Vaull as De Rhonde's Butler
- Mary Gordon as Minor Role (uncredited)
- Buddy Smith as Dirk de Rhonde as a child (uncredited)

== Production ==
In her 21st film, Marion Davies starred as twins separated at birth. The dark-haired girl is brought up in a wealthy home, while the blonde is brought up in the tenement slums and becomes a musical-comedy star. This MGM production saw Davies in the first of three teamings with Conrad Nagel and was also the first Davies production in which Louis B. Mayer and Irving Thalberg became involved. This was the first Davies film to use 2-strip Technicolor (which survives). The finale also includes the same hand-coloring technique (Handschiegl) that had been used in When Knighthood Was in Flower. The film was a big hit and resulted in a long-term contract with MGM.

== Preservation ==
Prints of Lights of Old Broadway are preserved at the Library of Congress and UCLA Film and Television Archive.

== See also ==
- List of early color feature films
