= China Bound =

1929 film

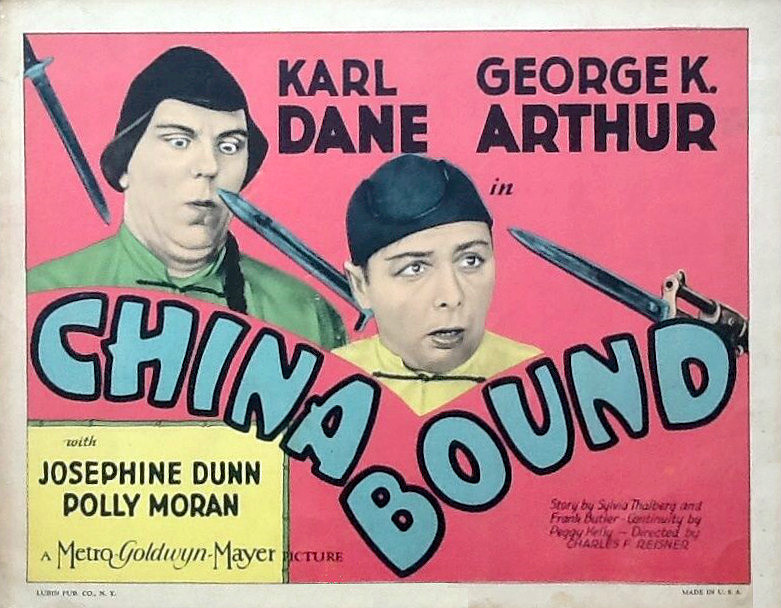
- Lobby card
- Directed by: Charles Reisner
- Written by: Frank Butler (story); Sylvia Thalberg (story); Peggy Kelly (writer); Robert E. Hopkins (intertitles)
- Produced by: Metro-Goldwyn-Mayer
- Starring: Karl Dane; George K. Arthur
- Cinematography: Reggie Lanning
- Edited by: George Hively
- Distributed by: Metro-Goldwyn-Mayer
- Release date: May 28, 1929
- Running time: 74 minutes; 7 reels
- Country: United States
- Language: Silent (English intertitles)

China Bound is a 1929 American silent comedy film produced and distributed by Metro-Goldwyn-Mayer. The film is rarely seen today due to some of its Asian racial content. A scene from the film was shown in the comedy retrospective MGM's Big Parade of Comedy (1965).

Copies of the film are held at the George Eastman Museum and Filmoteca Española (Madrid).

== Cast ==
- Karl Dane - Sharkey Nye
- George K. Arthur - Eustis
- Josephine Dunn - Joan
- Polly Moran - Sarah
- Carl Stockdale - McAllister
- Harry Woods - Officer
