= Brotherly Love (1928 film) =

1928 film

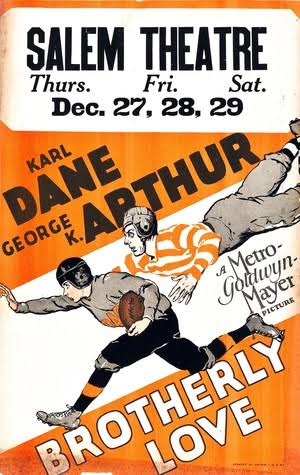
- Film poster
- Directed by: Charles Reisner
- Written by: Earl Baldwin (scenario); Lew Lipton (scenario); Robert Hopkins (intertitles)
- Starring: Karl Dane; George K. Arthur; Jean Arthur
- Cinematography: Henry Sharp (*French)
- Edited by: George Hively
- Distributed by: Metro-Goldwyn-Mayer
- Release date: December 23, 1928
- Running time: 67 minutes
- Country: United States
- Languages: Sound (Part-Talkie) (English Intertitles)

Brotherly Love is a 1928 sound part-talkie comedy film produced and distributed by Metro-Goldwyn-Mayer and directed by Charles Reisner. It is a starring vehicle for the comedy team of Karl Dane and George K. Arthur. Young Jean Arthur supports the comedy duo. In addition to sequences with audible dialogue or talking sequences, the film features a synchronized musical score and sound effects along with English intertitles. The soundtrack was recorded using the Western Electric sound-on-film system.

Some publicity photos from the film show Dane with Buster Keaton, but it is not clear whether Keaton had a cameo in the film that was later cut or merely posed with Dane for a photo while visiting the set.

One copy of the film, with sound discs, is in the collection of the UCLA Film and Television Archive. The Library of Congress database lists no copies.

== Plot ==
In Brotherly Love, Oscar (Karl Dane) is a hulking, gruff prison guard at Newberry Prison—fondly nicknamed “dear old Newberry,” which, in this satirical take on collegiate sports, is known more for turning out championship football teams than rehabilitated convicts. Oscar is proud, loud, and obsessed with authority, physicality, and masculine superiority. He takes his role as a guard—and as an enforcer of Newberry’s sports reputation—very seriously.

Into his path stumbles Jerry (George K. Arthur), a slight and dapper man who manages a women’s barber shop. Jerry is a world away from Oscar in size, style, and sensibility. The two meet under chaotic circumstances when a disagreement at the barber shop escalates into a full-on chase through the city. Jerry tries to flee, but through a comic misunderstanding, he’s arrested as a fugitive and summarily sent to Newberry Prison—where Oscar, to his delight, now has full authority over him.

Within the prison, Jerry tries to keep his head down, but Oscar immediately resumes their feud, ridiculing Jerry for his size and supposed softness. Both men soon fall for the same woman: Mary (Jean Arthur), the bright and charming daughter of Warden Brown (Richard Carlyle). Mary’s presence adds a romantic dimension to their already intense rivalry.

In an attempt to humiliate Jerry further, Oscar manipulates the prison’s football coach into putting Jerry on the team. He expects Jerry to be flattened on the gridiron and thereby shown up as a weakling in front of Mary. But in true underdog fashion, Jerry surprises everyone—himself included—by becoming the team’s secret weapon. Quick, agile, and unexpectedly brave, he proves a natural on the field, and his prowess begins to shift Mary’s affection toward him.

Oscar’s pride and bullying ways eventually catch up with him. He runs afoul of the law and finds himself no longer on the sidelines but behind bars. He is transferred to a rival prison—another “school” with its own football team—where he now plays on the opposing side. Meanwhile, Jerry is paroled. He’s a free man, but football still calls to him.

Learning that Newberry’s biggest game of the year is coming up—against the very prison where Oscar now plays—Jerry does the only thing that makes sense in this madcap world: he tries to get back into prison so he can help his old team win. Whether it’s for school spirit, a sense of justice, or just to beat Oscar once and for all, Jerry returns to “dear old Newberry” and re-suits for the gridiron.

The climactic football game is a riotous, slapstick affair—a parody of college football pageantry, staged behind prison walls. In the final moments of the game, Jerry dodges, dives, and dashes his way to score the winning touchdown for Newberry, securing the victory and cementing his place as a hero.

With the game won, Oscar outplayed, and Mary’s heart clearly won over, Jerry is no longer just a joke or a fugitive. He’s a champion, and he gets the girl. The film ends with Jerry and Mary married and heading toward their own happily ever after, while Oscar, in true silent comedy fashion, is left to reflect—ruefully, but with good humor—on his comeuppance.

== Cast ==
- Karl Dane - Oscar
- George K. Arthur - Jerry
- Jean Arthur - Mary
- Richard Carlyle - Warden Brown
- Edward Connelly - Coggswell
- Marcia Harris - Mrs. Coggswell

== See also ==
- List of early sound feature films (1926–1929)
