= Her Sister from Paris =

1925 film

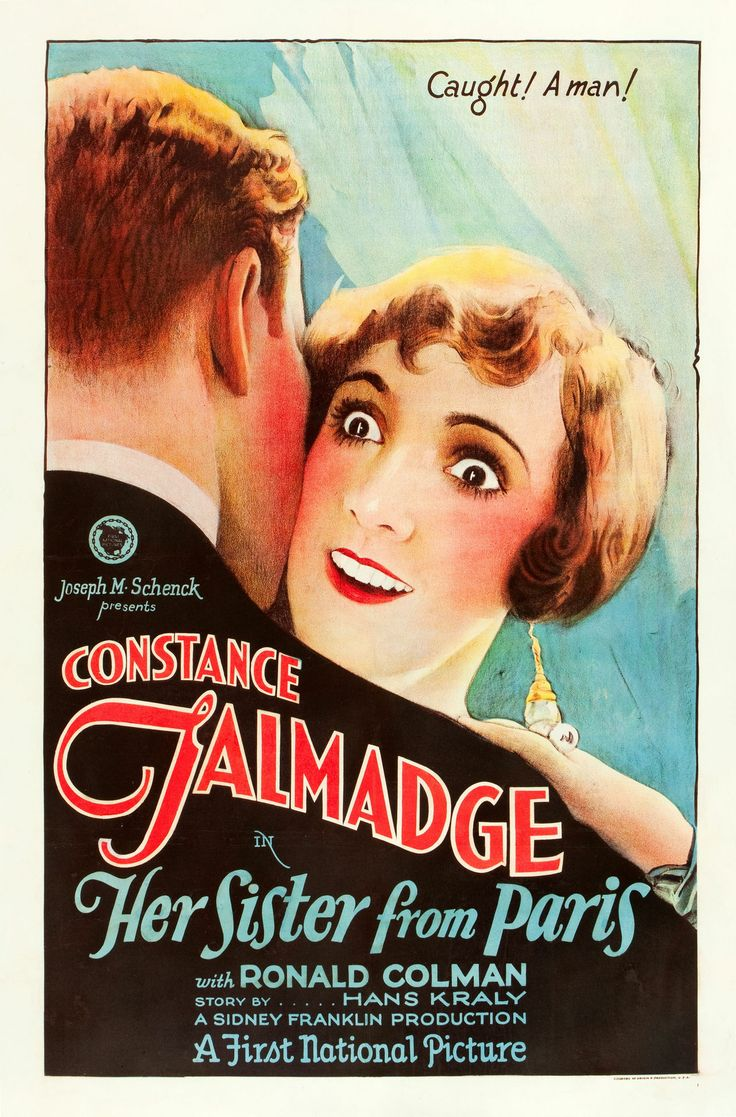
- Poster
- Directed by: Sidney Franklin
- Written by: Hanns Kräly
- Based on: The Twin Sister by Ludwig Fulda
- Produced by: Joseph M. Schenck
- Starring: Constance Talmadge; Ronald Colman; George K. Arthur
- Cinematography: Arthur Edeson
- Edited by: Hal C. Kern
- Production company: Joseph M. Schenck Productions
- Distributed by: First National Pictures
- Release date: August 2, 1925
- Running time: 74 minutes
- Country: United States
- Language: Silent (English intertitles)

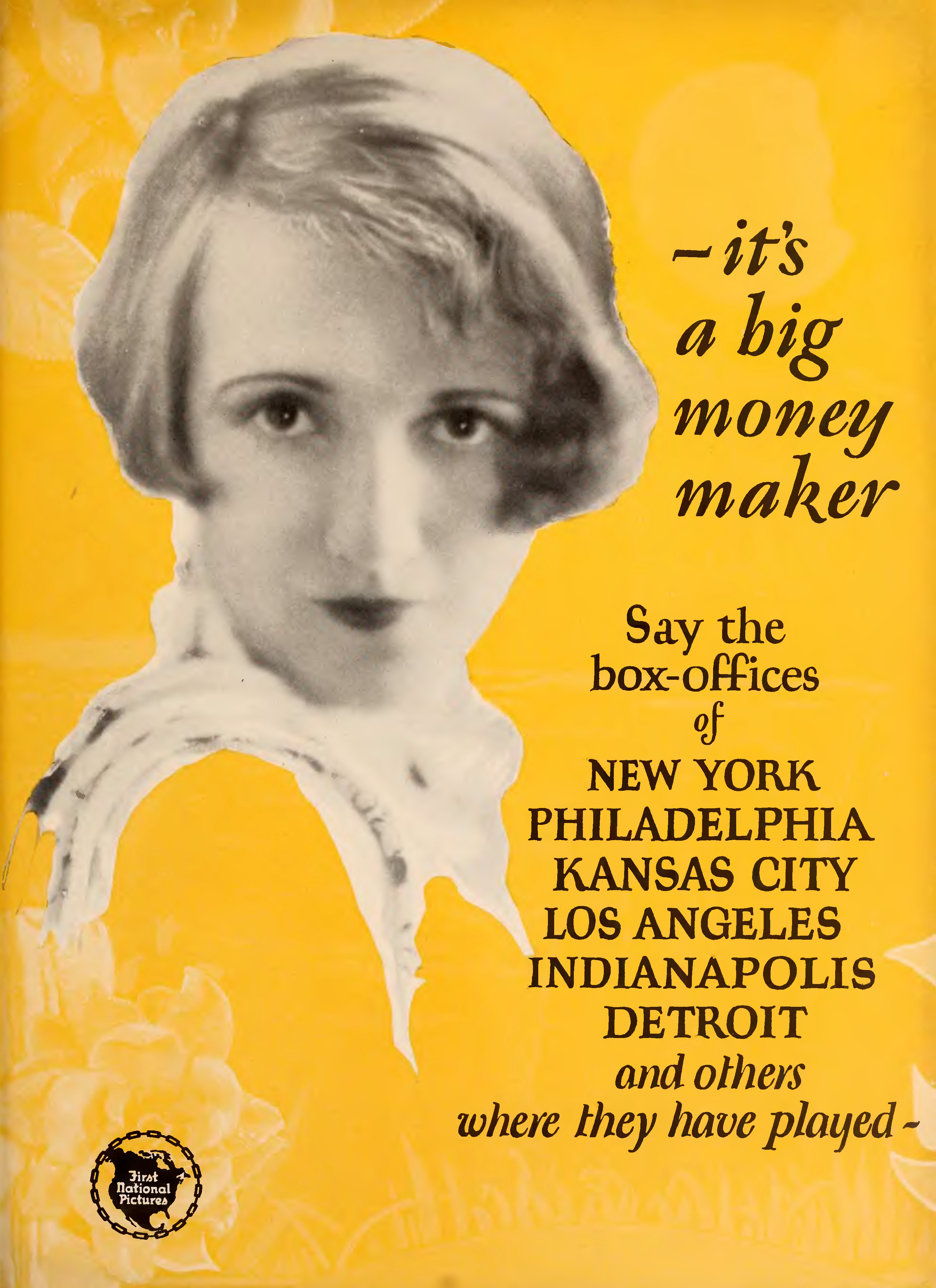
Advertisement

Her Sister from Paris is a 1925 American silent comedy film based upon the play The Twin Sister by Ludwig Fulda. It was directed by Sidney Franklin and stars Constance Talmadge, Ronald Colman, and George K. Arthur.

The film's sets were designed by the art director William Cameron Menzies while the costumes were by Adrian, working on his first production.

== Plot ==
As described in a film magazine reviews, Joseph Weyringer, a writer of novels, comes to believe that his wife Helen is too domestic. She interrupts her husband and a quarrel follows. When she leaves him to return to her mother’s, she meets her twin sister at the station. The latter has come to Vienna to dance. An invitation comes to the sister, La Perry, to come to supper after her performance with Joseph whom she has never seen. She accepts, then sends Helen to impersonate her at the supper. Helen is believed to be the dancer by Joseph. She has sex with Joseph and proposes that they elope. He is persuaded to go to the same hotel where they had spent their honeymoon. When they are given the bridal suite, he confesses that he cannot go on because he loves his wife. He is then confronted with his wife (who is really his sister-in-law). Helen is satisfied that her husband still loves her.

== Cast ==
- Constance Talmadge as Helen Weyringer / La Perry
- Ronald Colman as Joseph Weyringer
- George K. Arthur as Robert Well
- Gertrude Claire as Anna, the Housekeeper
- Mario Carillo as The King
- Ellinor Vanderveer as Theatre Patron

== Reception ==
At that time films in the United States were subject to local censorship, and, after the Chicago Board of Censors initially recommended changes, the chief of the Chicago Police Department denied Her Sister from Paris a permit. One theater challenged the denial by filing for a writ of mandamus in state court and took a survey of its patrons which favored the showing of the film by a margin of 1000 to 5. In the end, the chief of police issued a permit after an agreement to make 7 changes, 6 of which revised or eliminated intertitles.

== Preservation ==
A complete print of Her Sister from Paris is located at the Library of Congress.

== Bibliography ==
- Lea Jacobs. The Decline of Sentiment: American Film in the 1920s. University of California Press, 2008. ISBN 9780520254572
