= Basil Wrangell =

American film maker (1906–1977)

- Born: Basilio Petrovich von Wrangell; June 19, 1906; Ponte a Moriano, Toscana, Italy
- Died: April 26, 1977 (aged 70); Los Angeles, California, USA
- Occupations: Film editor, Film Director
- Spouses: Isabelle Fair (divorced): Vivian Ducloux

Basil Wrangell (born Basilio Petrovich von Wrangell) was an Italian-born film and television editor and director who worked in Hollywood from the 1920s through the 1970s.

== Biography ==
Basil was born at the Russian embassy in Ponte a Moriano, Italy, to Peter von Wrangell and Marussia Sasso-Ruffo. On his father's side, his family line had reportedly served as court attaches of old Russia since 1200 A.D. Basil's brother, George Wrangell, was a society columnist in New York City.

Basil attended the elite Grosvenor School in Nottingham, England, as a young man, until his family lost their wealth during the Russian Revolution. A chance opportunity to serve as an interpreter for Fred Niblo on Ben-Hur led to Basil traveling to America to take an entry-level job in a cutting room at a studio. He ended up becoming a proficient editor, eventually earning the chance to direct shorts and features. For television, he edited many episodes of I Spy, Peyton Place, Combat!, and Adventures in Paradise.

== Selected filmography ==
As editor:

- The Only Way to Spy (1978)
- Tobor the Great (1954)
- Love Happy (1949)
- The Good Earth (1937)
- Whipsaw (1935)
- Shadow of Doubt (1935)
- Hide-Out (1934)
- Hips, Hips, Hooray! (1934)
- Aggie Appleby, Maker of Men (1933)
- Midshipman Jack (1933)
- Bed of Roses (1933)
- Gabriel Over the White House (1933)
- Ladies They Talk About (1933)
- Freaks (1932)
- Sidewalks of New York (1931)
- Min and Bill (1930)
- Love in the Rough (1930)
- Let Us Be Gay (1930)
- The Woman Racket (1930)
- Marianne (1929)
- The Voice of the City (1929)
- All at Sea (1929)
- The Cameraman (1928)
- The Cardboard Lover (1928)
- A Certain Young Man (1928)
- The Latest from Paris (1928)
- In Old Kentucky (1927)
- Twelve Miles Out (1927)
- California (1927)

As director:

- South Seas Adventure (1958)
- Heartaches (1947)
- Philo Vance's Gamble (1947)
