= Baby Mine (1917 film) =

1917 film by John S. Robertson, Hugo Ballin

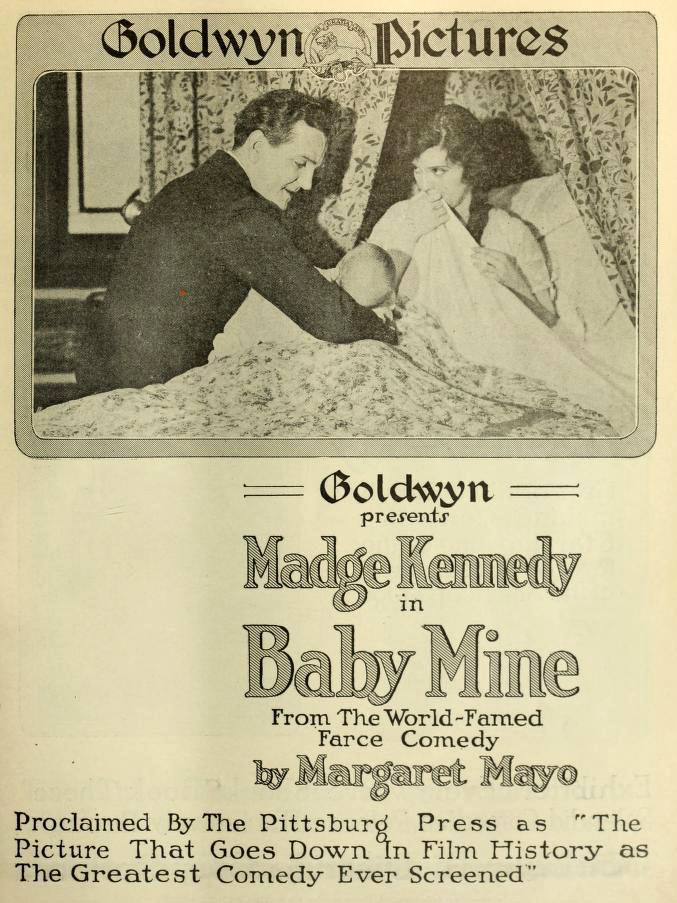
- Directed by: John S. Robertson; Hugo Ballin
- Written by: Doty Hobart (adaptation)
- Based on: Baby Mine by Margaret Mayo
- Produced by: Samuel Goldwyn
- Starring: Madge Kennedy
- Cinematography: Arthur Edeson
- Distributed by: Goldwyn Pictures
- Release date: September 23, 1917
- Running time: 6 reels
- Country: United States
- Language: Silent (English intertitles)

Baby Mine is a 1917 American silent comedy film directed by both John S. Robertson and Hugo Ballin and starring Madge Kennedy. The picture marked Kennedy's screen debut and was one of the first films produced by Samuel Goldwyn as an independent after founding his own studio.

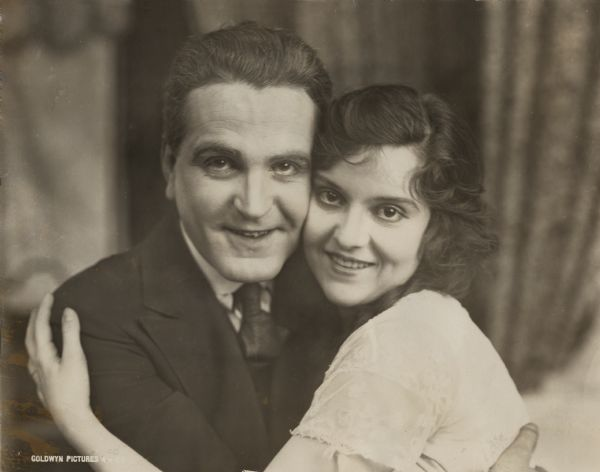
Frank Morgan and Madge Kennedy, 1917

The film is based on a 1910 Broadway play Baby Mine by Margaret Mayo. The story was filmed once again as Baby Mine (1928) with Charlotte Greenwood at MGM, the successor to Goldwyn Pictures. This version, however, at one time thought lost, is held in the French archive Cinematheque Francais.

== Plot ==
As described in a film magazine, Alfred catches his wife Zoie in so many lies that he leaves home and establishes an office in Boston. He is very fond of children so Zoie and Jimmie's wife Aggie conspire to tell him that an heir has arrived, with Zoie planning on adopting a baby. Before arrangements have been completed for the baby's adoption, Alfred arrives home, necessitating the stealing of a child from a foundling home. The mother of the baby, however, sets up such a rumpus that they decide to return it and borrow the washerwoman's new-born babe, one of a set of twins. More complications result when Jimmie comes in with the other twin, followed by the washerwoman's husband demanding his children back. While the three babies are being cooed over by Alfred, who believes he is the father of triplets, the respective parents arrive and claim their children.

== Cast ==
- Madge Kennedy as Zoie
- Kathryn Adams as Aggie (credited as Katherine Adams)
- John Cumberland as Jimmie
- Frank Morgan as Alfred
- Sonia Marcelle as Italian Mother
- Virginia Madigan as Maggie
- Jack Ridgeway as O'Flarity (credited as Jack Ridgway)
- Nellie Fillmore as Mrs. O'Flarity

== Reception ==
Like many American films of the time, Baby Mine was subject to cuts by city and state film censorship boards. The Chicago Board of Censors ordered cut a closeup of money.
