= Rookies (1927 film) =

1927 film by Sam Wood

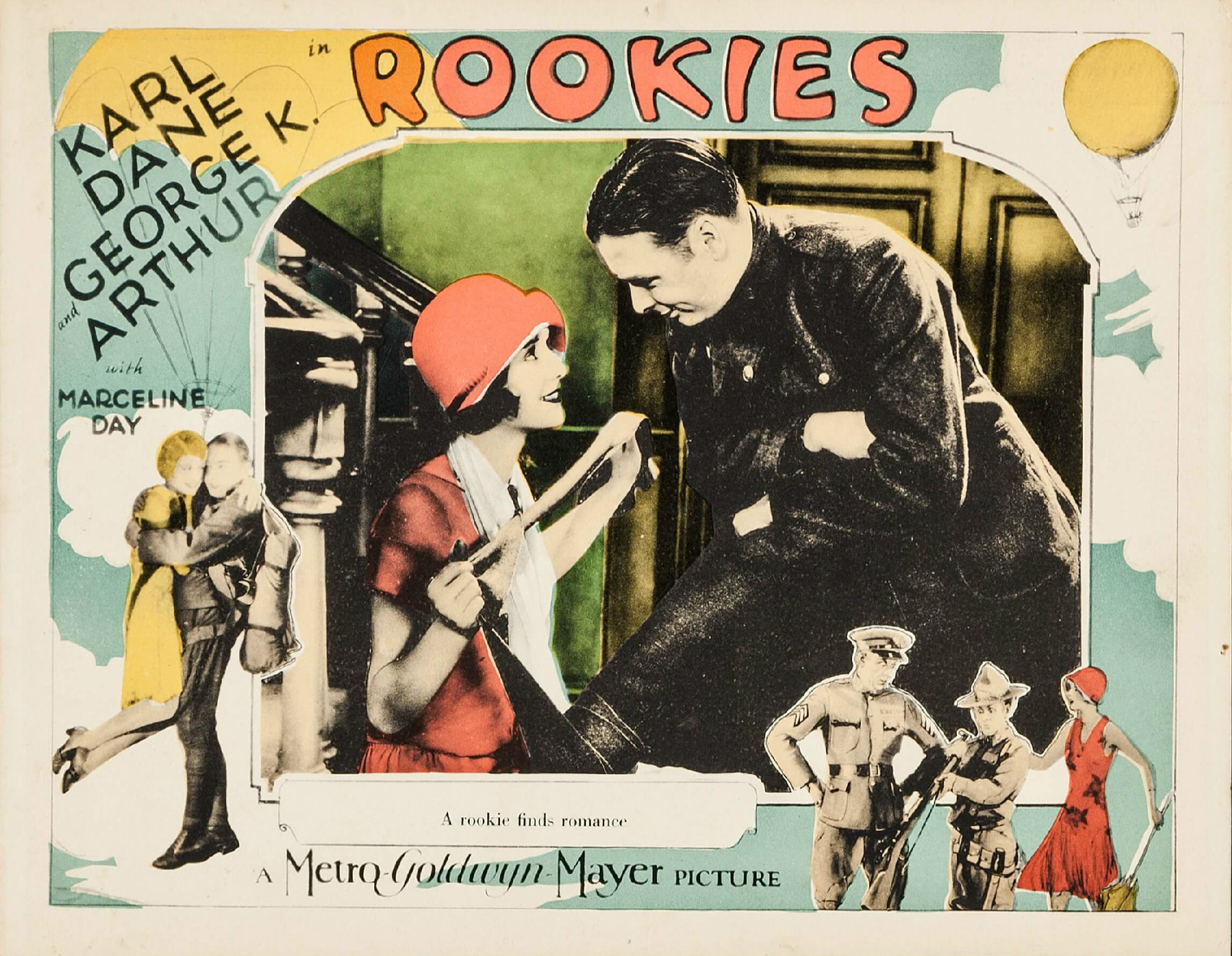
- Lobby card
- Directed by: Sam Wood
- Written by: Joe Farnham; Bryan Morgan (screenplay)
- Starring: Karl Dane; George K. Arthur
- Cinematography: Ira H. Morgan
- Edited by: Conrad A. Nervig
- Production company: Metro-Goldwyn-Mayer
- Distributed by: Metro-Goldwyn-Mayer
- Release date: April 30, 1927
- Running time: 70 minutes
- Country: United States
- Language: Silent (English intertitles)

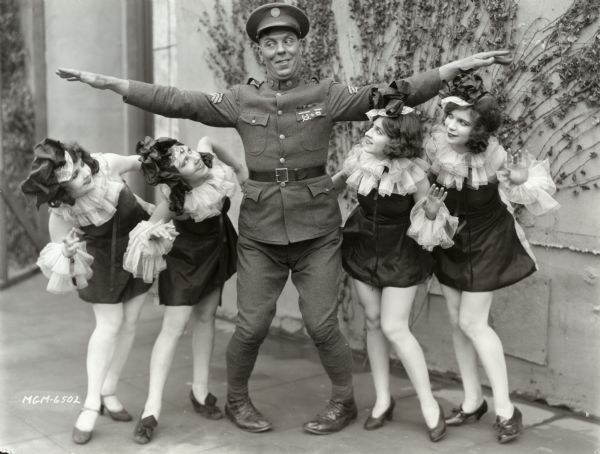
Still with Karl Dane and chorus girls.

Rookies (aka Red, White and Blue) is a 1927 American silent comedy film directed by Sam Wood and released by Metro-Goldwyn-Mayer. The film pairs the comedy teaming of Karl Dane and George K. Arthur as the stars of Rookies. Because of the popularity of this film, this would be the first of several collaborations between the two actors. The comedy team of "... gangly Karl Dane and diminutive George K. Arthur... ... Clearly conceived to cash in on the success of Paramount's Wallace Beery-Raymond Hatton service comedy Behind the Front, this Dane-Arthur vehicle finds our mismatched heroes cast as a sergeant and private during WWI."

== Plot ==
While flirting with dancer Zella Fay (Louise Lorraine) at a night club, Sergeant Diggs (Karl Dane), has taken an immediate dislike to Greg Lee (George K. Arthur), a cabaret dancer and Zella's partner. He dismisses Lee as a simpering dandy. Lee arrogantly tries to get even with the sergeant, and as a result, he is arrested and sent to an Army training camp instead of jail.

With World War I raging, now drafted as a private, Lee again finds himself pitted against tough Drill Sergeant Diggs. Private Lee does everything he can to annoy Sergeant Diggs, thinking it will get him thrown out of the Army.

At camp, Private Lee's life is made miserable by the constant badgering of Diggs, but he reciprocates in kind. Both men have their sights set on the pretty Betty Wayne (Marceline Day), the judge's daughter. The rivalry between the tough sergeant and bumbling recruit goes through many mishaps and missteps until it finally gets resolved.

The Army camp has reconnaissance balloons and, by accident, Diggs and Betty find themselves adrift in a runaway balloon. Lee sees a full complement of parachutes, and sets off in an aircraft to rescue Diggs and Betty.

Lee manages to pull off an aircraft-to-balloon jump, making sure that the two stranded accidental aerialists make it safely to the ground. This heroic feat thus proves his heroism and fortitude to his rival and Betty.

== Cast ==
- Karl Dane as Sergeant Diggs
- George K. Arthur as Greg Lee
- Marceline Day as Betty Wayne
- Louise Lorraine as Zella Fay
- Frank Currier as The Judge
- E. H. Calvert as The Colonel
- Tom O'Brien as Sgt. O'Brien
- Charles Sullivan as Cpl. Sullivan
- Lincoln Stedman as Sleepy
- Gene Stone as Smarty

== Production ==
According to the January 2, 1927 in Film Daily, director Sam Wood was starting production on Byron Morgan's story. Under the working title of Red, White and Blue, principal photography on Rookies began on January 3, 1927.

An impressive slate of crew members worked for the MGM production. The crew included: set designers Cedric Gibbons and David Townsend, Andre'-ani in costume design and Herbert I. Leeds (credited as Bert Levy) as title illustrator. (Note: The one spectacular aerial stunt in Rookies was an aircraft-to-balloon transfer.)

== Reception ==
Despite the meagre budget in a B film, Rookies turned out to be a surprise box office hit. Film reviewer Hal Erickson, noted that Rookies, had a new comedy teaming, "After several hilarious if disjointed slapstick misadventures, the boys are set adrift in a reconnaissance balloon. There was hardly an original moment in 'Rookies', but that's not to say it wasn't funny. The film was an enormous box-office hit, spawning a series of equally well-received feature films starring Dane and Arthur."

== Preservation ==
A copy of Rookies is preserved by MGM and a trailer is held by the Library of Congress (Government of the United States).
