= Brian Morgan (lawyer) =

Canadian lawyer

Brian Morgan (1950–2007) was a Canadian lawyer, born in Lethbridge, Alberta to Frederick and Audrey Morgan (née Boyd). He attended the University of Trinity College and later the University of Oxford as a Rhodes Scholar. He served as a law clerk for Mr. Justice Brian Dickson. He argued the first case heard in the Supreme Court of Canada after the passing of the Charter of Rights and Freedoms.
