= Baby Be Mine (disambiguation) =

Baby Be Mine may refer to:

- "Baby Be Mine", a 1993 song by Blackstreet
- "Baby Be Mine", a 1982 song by Michael Jackson on Thriller
- "Baby, Be Mine", a 1987 song by Miki Howard on Love Confessions
- "Baby Be Mine", a 2011 song by The Parlotones on Eavesdropping on the Songs of Whales
