= Baby Mine (1928 film) =

1928 film

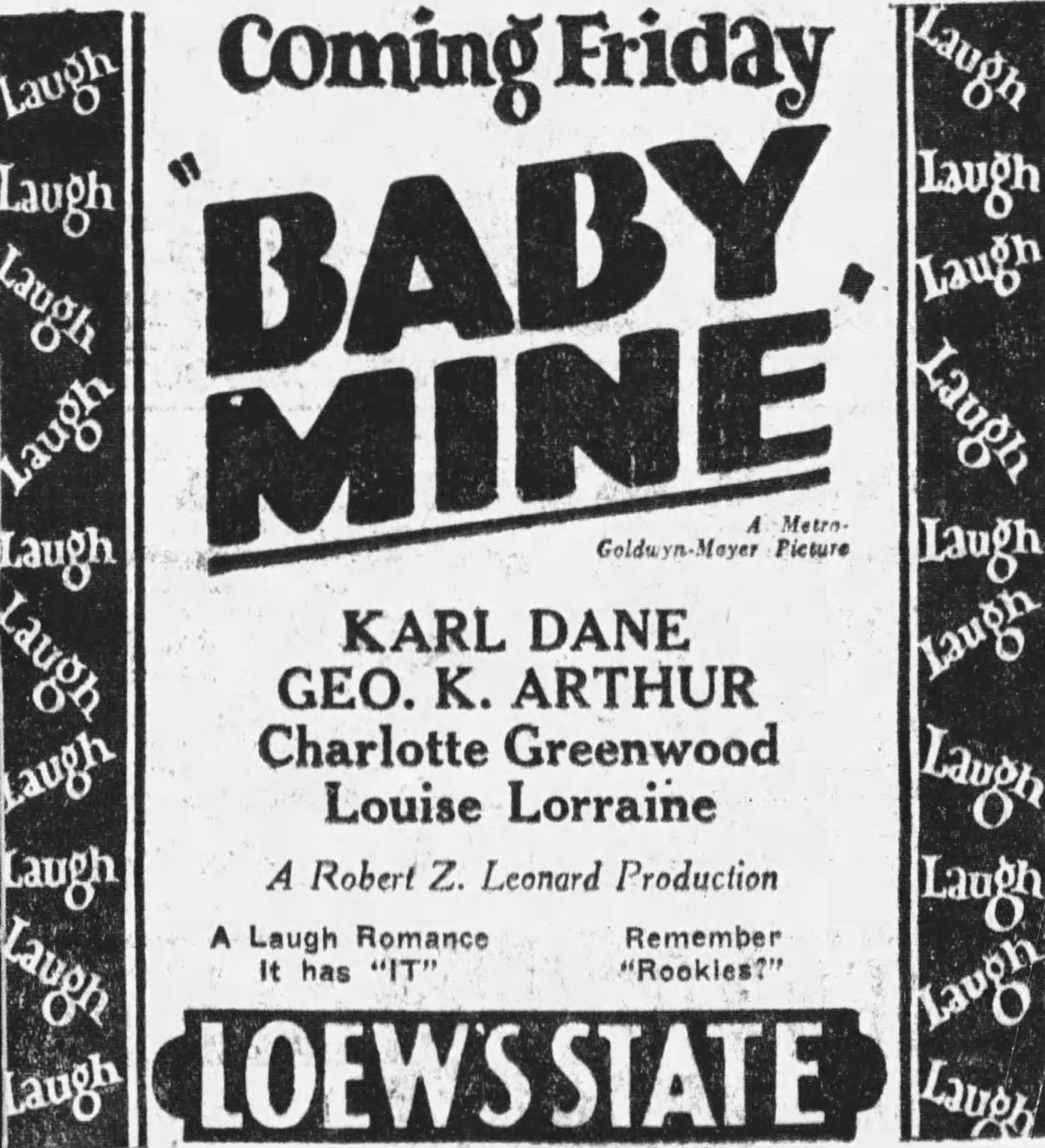
- 1928 newspaper advertisement for Baby Mine
- Directed by: Robert Z. Leonard
- Written by: Sylvia Thalberg (adaptation); Lew Lipton (scenario); F. Hugh Herbert (scenario); Ralph Spence (intertitles)
- Based on: Baby Mine by Margaret Mayo
- Produced by: Louis B. Mayer; Irving Thalberg; Robert Z. Leonard
- Starring: Karl Dane; George K. Arthur; Charlotte Greenwood
- Cinematography: Faxon M. Dean
- Edited by: Sam Zimbalist
- Production company: Metro-Goldwyn-Mayer
- Distributed by: Metro-Goldwyn-Mayer
- Release date: January 8, 1928
- Running time: 6 reels
- Country: United States
- Language: Silent film (English intertitles)

Baby Mine is a 1928 American silent comedy film produced and distributed by Metro-Goldwyn-Mayer. This film is a remake of the 1917 film Baby Mine, both being based on Margaret Mayo's 1910 Broadway comedy Baby Mine. This film stars Karl Dane, George K. Arthur and Charlotte Greenwood.

== Cast ==
- Karl Dane - Oswald Hardy
- George K. Arthur - Jimmy Hemingway
- Charlotte Greenwood - Emma
- Louise Lorraine - Helen
- Neal Dodd

== Reception ==
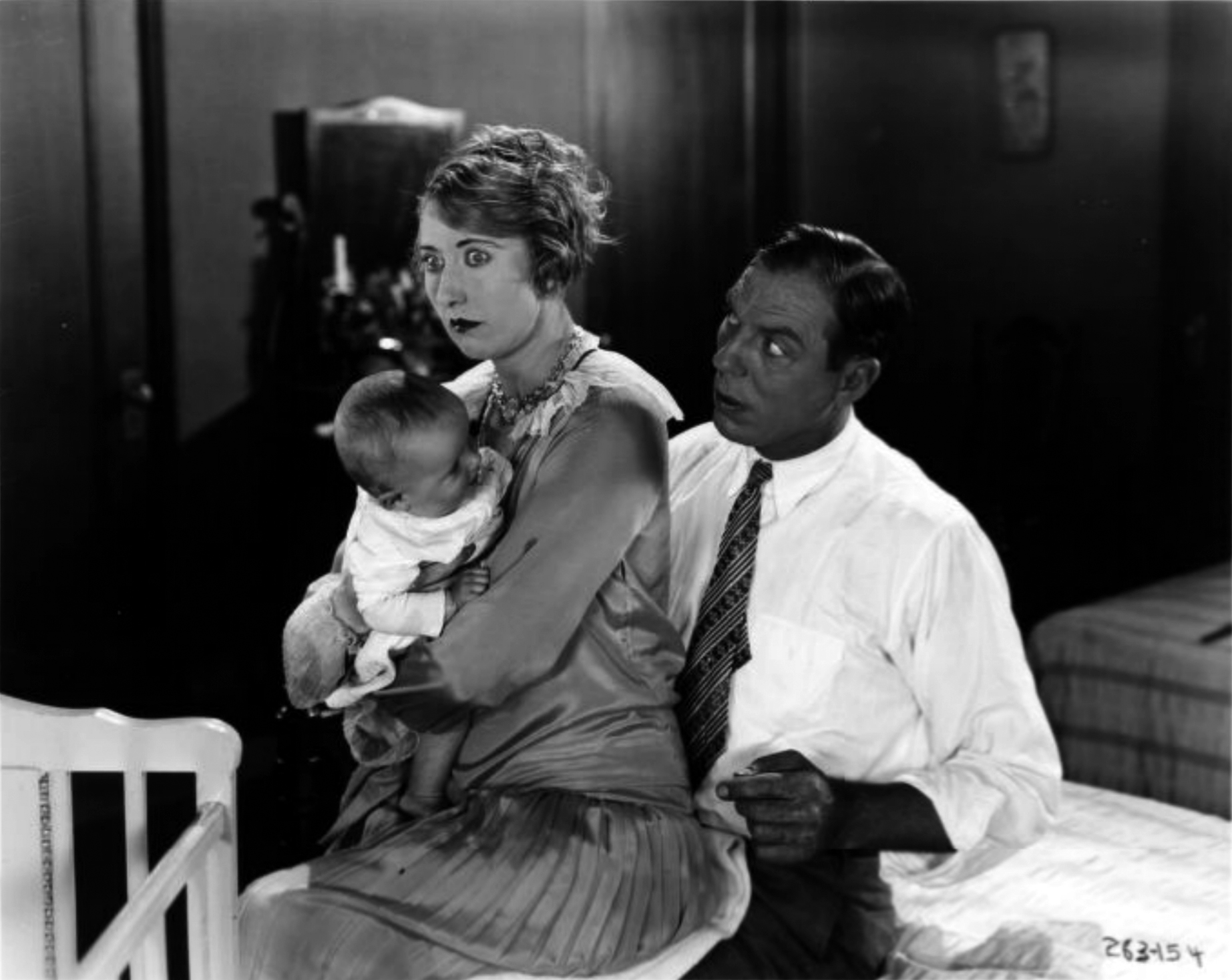
Still of the film, showing Greenwood and Dane

Dane and Greenwood were praised by Los Angeles Times critic Philip K. Scheuer, who described the film as "continuously funny".

== Preservation status ==
Baby Mine is now considered a lost film.
