= George K. Arthur =

English actor (1899–1985)

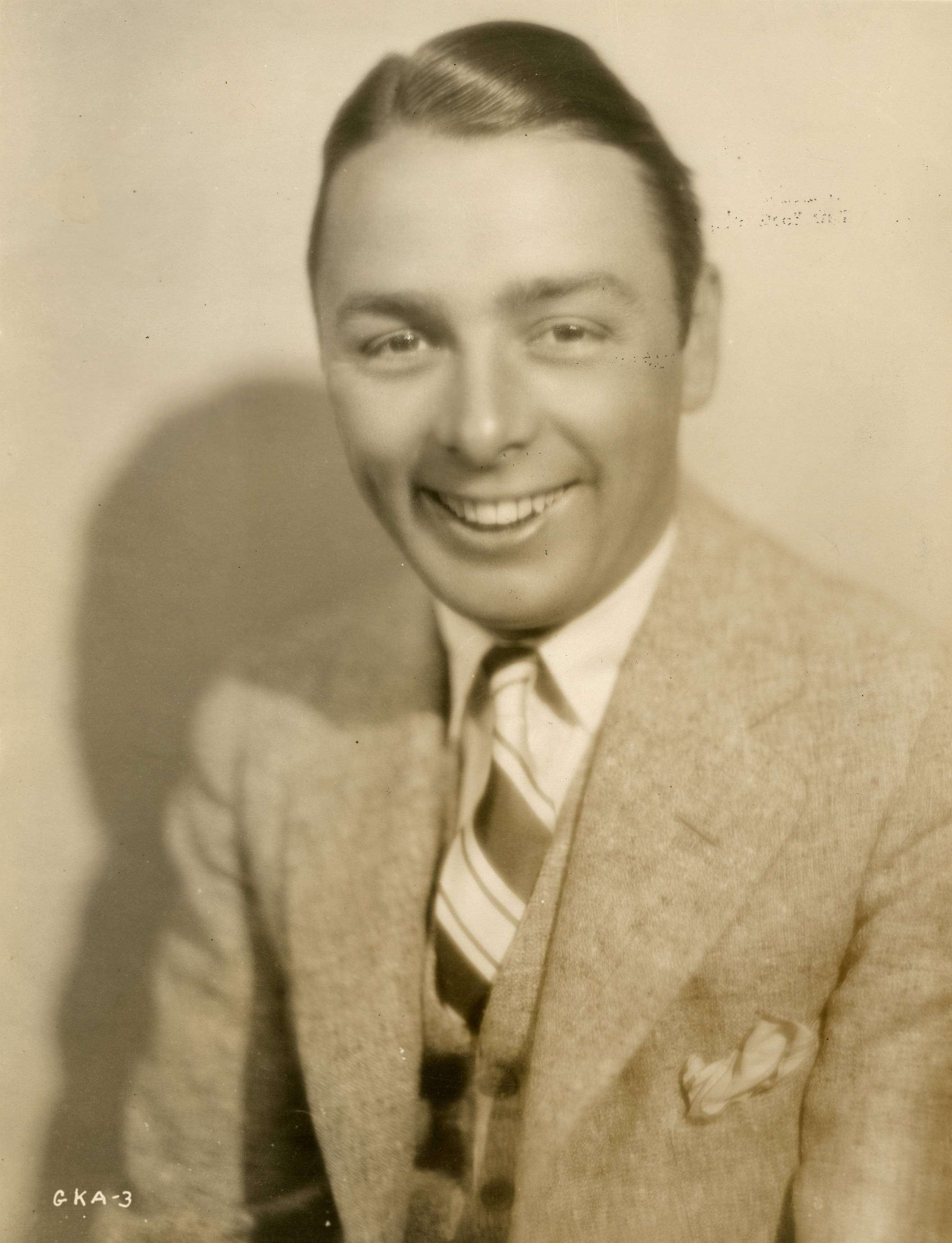
- Born: 27 January 1899; Aberdeen, Scotland
- Died: 30 May 1985 (aged 86); New York City, US
- Occupation: Actor
- Years active: 1919-1958

Arthur George Brest (27 January 1899 – 30 May 1985), known professionally as George K. Arthur, was an English actor and producer, born in Aberdeen, Scotland. He appeared in more than 50 films between 1919 and 1935, and is best known as the diminutive half of the comedy team of Dane & Arthur.

== Screen career ==
Arthur projected a friendly, amiable personality on screen, which earned him light-comedy character roles in silent films. In 1927 he was working at the prestigious Metro-Goldwyn-Mayer studio, where producer Harry Rapf decided that the 5' 6" Arthur would make a good foil for 6' 3" character actor Karl Dane. Dane & Arthur's first feature was Rookies (1927), and the team went on to make a series of economical and well-received features until the end of the silent-film era.

George K. Arthur's British-accented speaking voice did not pose a problem for the new talking pictures, but Karl Dane's Danish accent was considered too thick to be easily understood. MGM discontinued the Dane & Arthur series after the silent feature China Bound (1929); their only talking film for MGM was The Hollywood Revue of 1929, in which they had only a brief guest appearance with very little dialogue.

Although Dane & Arthur had made their reputations as silent comedians, they did star in 10 sound comedies, albeit less prestigious short subjects. Producer Larry Darmour made six for RKO release in 1930–31, and Paramount made four more in 1931–32. Dane & Arthur also toured on Paramount's vaudeville circuit in 1931. After their Paramount commitments were fulfilled, Dane & Arthur went their separate ways.

George K. Arthur returned to character roles, often for MGM, through 1935.

== Career changes ==
After retiring as an actor Arthur remained with MGM, accepting a job in the sales department of the studio's New York film exchange. While in New York he hosted a weekly 15-minute radio program for WQXR, in which he offered commentary and interviews as a Broadway "first nighter". He had become an American citizen and enlisted in the U. S. Air Force. During World War II he organized shows for the troops.

Arthur later became a producer and distributor of short films. He won an Academy Award for Best Short Film in 1957, for the film The Bespoke Overcoat; and received an additional nomination in the same category the year prior, for On the Twelfth Day.

== Selected filmography ==
- Spring Fever (1919)
- A Dear Fool (1921)
- Kipps (1921)
- Lamp in the Desert (1922)
- The Wheels of Chance (1922)
- Love's Influence (1922)
- Flames of Passion (1922)
- Madness of Youth (1923)
- Paddy the Next Best Thing (1923)
- Hollywood (1923)
- Flames of Desire (1924)
- The Salvation Hunters (1925)
- Lady of the Night (1925)
- Pretty Ladies (1925)
- Her Sister from Paris (1925)
- Sun-Up (1925)
- Lights of Old Broadway (1925)
- Irene (1926)
- Sunny Side Up (1926)
- The Exquisite Sinner (1926)
- Kiki (1926)
- The Boob (1926)
- The Boy Friend (1926)
- The Waning Sex (1926)
- Almost a Lady (1926)
- Bardelys the Magnificent (1926)
- When the Wife's Away (1926)
- Lovers (1927)
- Rookies (1927, with Karl Dane)
- The Gingham Girl (1927)
- Tillie the Toiler (1927)
- The Student Prince in Old Heidelberg (1927) (uncredited)
- Spring Fever (1927)
- Baby Mine (1928, with Dane)
- Wickedness Preferred (1929)
- Circus Rookies (1928, with Dane)
- Detectives (1928, with Dane)
- Brotherly Love (1928, with Dane)
- Show People (1928) (uncredited cameo, with Dane)
- All At Sea (1929, with Dane)
- China Bound (1929, with Dane)
- The Last of Mrs. Cheyney (1929)
- The Hollywood Revue of 1929 (1929, with Dane)
- Chasing Rainbows (1930)
- Where Is This Lady? (1932)
- Oliver Twist (1933)
- Pleasure Cruise (1933)
- Looking Forward (1933)
- Riptide (1934)
- Vanessa: Her Love Story (1935)
- On the Twelfth Day… (1955) – producer
- The Bespoke Overcoat (1956) – producer
