= Karl Dane =

Danish-American actor and comedian

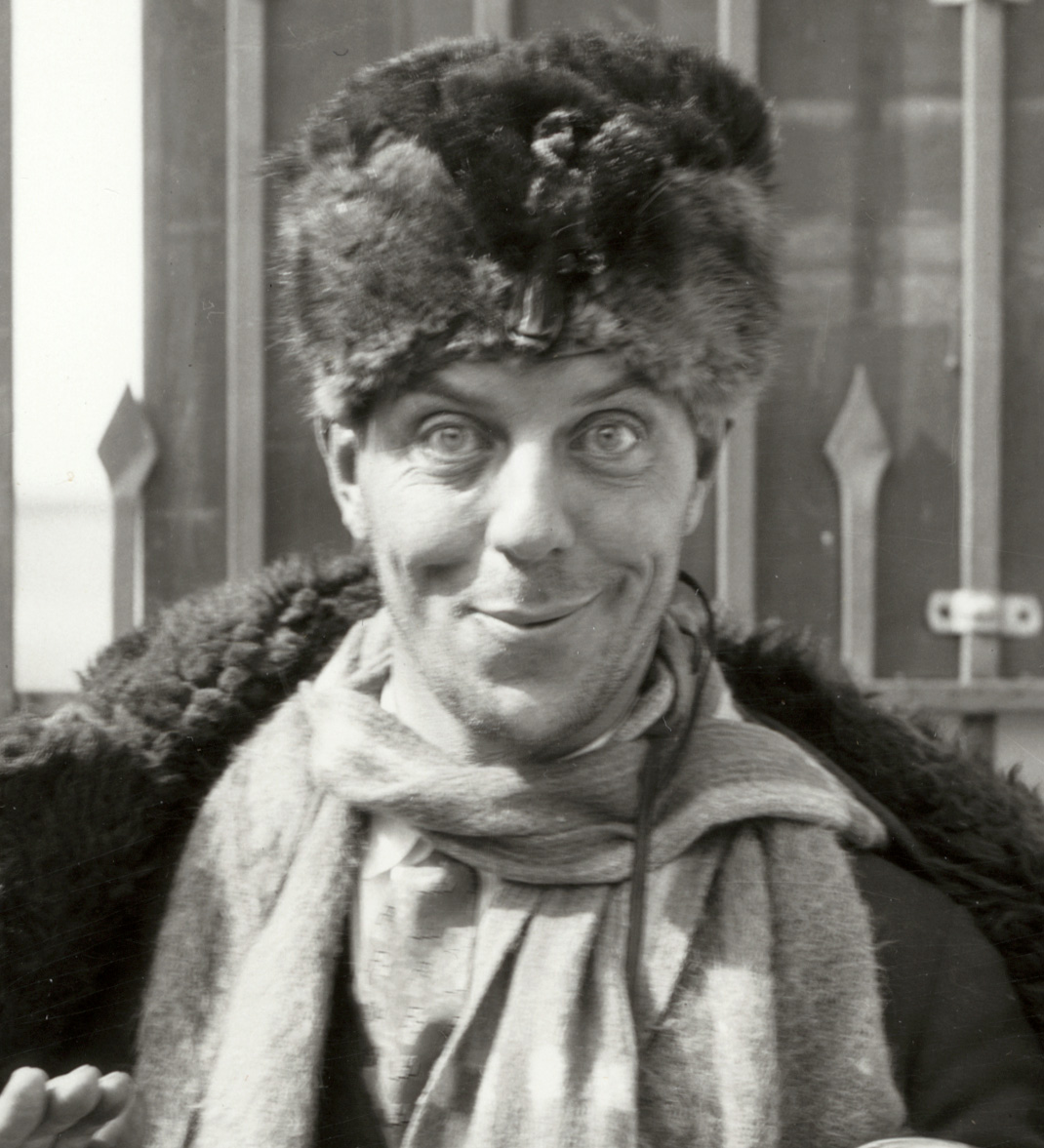
- Dane in a publicity still taken at the gates of the MGM studio (1927)
- Born: Rasmus Karl Therkelsen Gottlieb; 12 October 1886; Copenhagen, Denmark
- Died: 14 April 1934 (aged 47); Los Angeles, California, U.S.
- Resting place: Hollywood Forever Cemetery
- Citizenship: Danish; American (1928-1934)
- Occupations: Actor, comedian
- Years active: 1917–1933
- Spouses: Carla Dagmar Hagen (m. 1910; div. 1919) Helen Benson (m. 1921; died 1923) Emma Awilda Peabody (m. 1924; div. 1924)
- Children: 3

Karl Dane (born Rasmus Karl Therkelsen Gottlieb, 12 October 1886 – 14 April 1934) was a Danish-American comedian and actor known for his work in American films, mainly of the silent film era. He became a star after portraying “Slim”, a supporting role in one of the most successful silent films of all time, The Big Parade (1925), directed by King Vidor and starring John Gilbert.

After signing with MGM in 1926, he appeared in supporting roles in several popular silent films before teaming up with George K. Arthur to form the successful comedy duo Dane & Arthur. They appeared in a number of very successful silent comedy features. When sound films arrived, they made short-subject comedies and toured in vaudeville. At the peak of his career, Dane earned $1,500 a week. As the film industry transitioned from silent to sound films in the late 1920s, Dane's thick Danish accent became problematic. By 1930, Dane was relegated to less prominent roles, often with little to no dialogue. Later that year, MGM terminated his contract. Dane attempted to pursue work in other fields but found no success. Broke and despondent, he died of a self-inflicted gunshot wound in April 1934.

Karl Dane's rapid career decline, depression, and subsequent death have been cited as an extreme example of the fate that befell many silent film stars who were unable to make the transition from silent to sound films.

== Early life ==
Dane was born Rasmus Karl Therkelsen Gottlieb (not Karl Daen as sometimes reported) in Turesensgade 23 in central Copenhagen, Denmark, to Rasmus Carl Marius Gottlieb and Anne Cathrine (née Simonsen) Gottlieb. He had two brothers: Reinald Marius and Viggo Eiler. His parents' marriage was apparently stormy, with his father having trouble with alcohol and money management. In 1903, Dane's parents divorced, leaving him in the custody of his mother. His father was a glove maker by trade but enjoyed the theatre. Around the start of the 20th century, he built a toy theatre which people began to pay to see; during this time, Dane and his brother Reinald would perform for the crowds. His father worked as a curtain puller at the local theatre, to which his two sons accompanied him. Dane later said this would inspire him to act. In 1900, Dane and his brother apprenticed as machinists, a job he would perform on and off throughout his life. In 1907, he began compulsory military service in the First Artillery Battalion. He was promoted to lance corporal in June 1908. After being discharged from the military, he married dressmaker Carla Dagmar Hagen on 10 September 1910. The marriage produced two children: Ejlert Carl (born March 1911) and Ingeborg Helene (July 1912). With the outbreak of World War I, Dane was recalled up to duty; he was stationed again at Trekroner Fort in August 1914. He was promoted to corporal in November 1915.

On 25 January 1916, Dane headed for the United States alone. He intended to send for his family later. He boarded the SS Oscar II with $25 in his pocket and speaking no English. The ship arrived on 11 February 1916 at Ellis Island. Dane passed immigrant inspection and moved to 345 Court Street in Brooklyn with a friend named Charles Lindgren. The same day, he found work in a foundry. Sometime in 1916 he moved to Lincoln, Nebraska, where he worked as an auto mechanic. By summer 1917, he returned to New York City where he again worked as a mechanic.

== Career ==
=== Early years ===
In late 1917, Dane made his film début in a bit part in a Vitagraph Studios short filmed in Fort Lee, New Jersey. He made $3 a day (as a mechanic he had been making $3 a week) for his part. However, his scenes were cut and the title of this film is not known. Any footage is presumed lost. Dane then appeared in Warner Bros. anti-German sentiment film My Four Years in Germany as Chancellor von Bethmann-Hollweg. This would be the first of many such roles for Dane in his early career. The film was released 29 April 1918 and was a success, earning an approximate $500,000 at the box office (the film had a budget of $50,000). His next film was Wolves of Kultur which contained 15 chapters (running about three hours total). The film was released chapter by chapter between 1918 and 1919. He then followed with the June Mathis-penned film To Hell with the Kaiser!, reprising his role as Chancellor von Bethmann-Hollweg. Dane completed two more anti-German propaganda style films, The Great Victory, Wilson or the Kaiser? The Fall of the Hohenzollerns and Daring Hearts, both released in 1919. In 1920, Dane portrayed "The Wolf" in another 15-chapter serial The Whirlwind. That film is now presumed lost.

In early 1921, Dane met a Swedish immigrant named Helen Benson. He then quit acting and moved with Benson to Van Nuys, California, where they opened a chicken farm. They married on 15 June 1921. On 9 August 1923, Benson died in childbirth as did the couple's daughter. In December 1923, Dane ran into his old friend Charles Hutchison who convinced him to appear in a serial he was then producing.

=== Stardom ===
In December 1924, MGM casting director Robert McIntyre — who had previously hired Dane back at Vitagraph — recommended the actor for a role in King Vidor's latest project, The Big Parade. Dane was selected to play the part of Slim, alongside John Gilbert and Renée Adorée. The movie was a major success, both critically and financially, becoming the second highest grossing silent film of all time, making almost $6.5 million (approximately $125,274,000 today). As a consequence, Dane's career blossomed.

In 1926, he co-starred with Rudolph Valentino and Vilma Bánky in The Son of the Sheik. The film was released after Valentino's death in August 1926 and became a massive success. It was re-released several more times well into the late 1930s. After working on The Son of the Sheik, Dane signed a contract with MGM in June 1926. He began to appear in comic relief roles in several films including The Scarlet Letter (directed by Victor Sjöström and starring Lillian Gish), La Bohème (again directed by Vidor, and starring Gish, Gilbert and Adorée), and Alias Jimmy Valentine with William Haines and Leila Hyams.

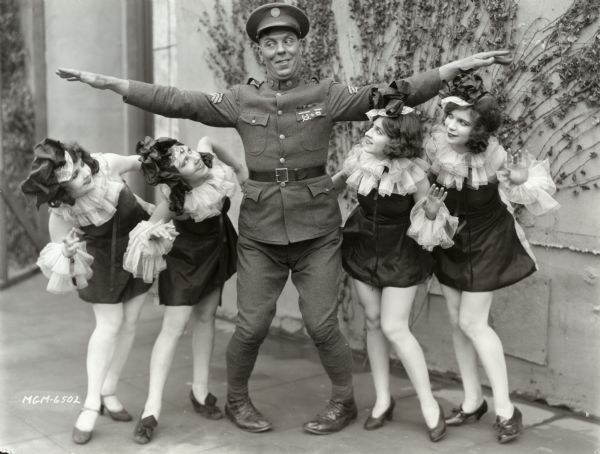
Karl Dane, wearing a U.S. Army sergeant's costume for the 1927 film Rookies, demonstrates how he towers over four chorus girls in an MGM publicity still.

=== Dane & Arthur ===
Soon after signing his MGM contract, Dane began work on the Vidor film, Bardelys the Magnificent. It was on this film that MGM executive Harry Rapf decided to pair the burly Dane with the slight English actor George K. Arthur. The new comedy team was dubbed Dane & Arthur. In May 1927, the duo's first film, Rookies, opened and was an instant success. In June 1927, MGM signed Dane to a long-term contract. He co-starred in the Dane & Arthur comedies and played character roles in dramatic films like The Trail of '98.

In April 1928, Dane broke his shoulder on the set. He developed a serious case of bronchial pneumonia but eventually recovered and went back to work. At the peak of his success and popularity, Dane earned $1500 a week.

=== Talkies and decline ===
By 1929, sound films were rising in popularity and MGM was worried that actors with thick foreign accents would not be ideal for sound films. In his memoirs, George K. Arthur claimed that after MGM tested the duo for sound films, they felt his British accent was "more desirable" and thought Dane's thick Danish accent made his English difficult for audiences to understand. As a result, MGM discontinued the Dane & Arthur series after China Bound (1929) and began offering Dane fewer roles. Dane & Arthur's only talking MGM credit was a brief guest appearance in the all-star musical comedy The Hollywood Revue of 1929, and their skit was staged with very little dialogue.

In 1930, Dane had a supporting role in Montana Moon, a musical Western starring Joan Crawford and Johnny Mack Brown. He followed with another supporting role (in which he had no dialogue) in the prison drama The Big House, starring Robert Montgomery, Wallace Beery and Chester Morris. Later that year MGM terminated Dane's contract, citing his Danish accent. In his final interview in September 1933, Dane claimed that MGM wanted to renew his contract but he declined as he had suffered a nervous breakdown. Dane admitted that he had found it difficult to transition from silent to sound films due to his accent, but also said that he was exhausted from years of constant filming and was grieving the death of his father who died in September 1930.

Although the Dane & Arthur series had been terminated by MGM, they did star in 10 sound films, albeit less prestigious short subjects. In 1930, Dane & Arthur were signed by producer Larry Darmour for six short-subject comedies, released through RKO Radio Pictures. In December 1930 Paramount Pictures' theater chain offered Dane & Arthur a 23-week vaudeville tour. In July 1931, Dane & Arthur were signed for four more shorts to be produced at Paramount's New York studio, beginning with The Lease Breakers (released in September 1931). The final film, Summer Daze (1932), ended the series and the Dane-Arthur partnership.

In November 1931, Dane and some friends formed a mining corporation called Avelina Mines. The venture failed. By February 1932, Dane had returned to vaudeville, this time as a solo comedian. His act was panned by critics and apparently short-lived. Dane's final film appearance was a bit role as a dispatcher in the 1933 thriller The Whispering Shadow, starring Bela Lugosi.

== Personal life ==
Dane became an American citizen on 13 July 1928 and legally changed his name to Karl Dane.

=== Marriages and relationships ===
Dane's first marriage was to Carla Dagmar Hagen. The couple married 10 September 1910 at Saint Paul's Church in Copenhagen. Dane's only living children were born during this union; son Ejlert Carl, in 1911 and daughter Ingeborg Helene in 1912. When Dane immigrated to the US, in 1916, he intended to send for his family later. However, by the time his career became successful, Dane had begun to lose touch with his family. Carla no longer wanted to join him, as she was suffering from ill health. The pair separated in 1918 and divorced in 1919.

In early 1921, Dane met Swedish immigrant Helen Benson. It was then he quit films and moved to Van Nuys. The couple married on 15 June 1921. Benson died in childbirth 9 August 1923, as did the couple's daughter. Unable to cope with the loss of his wife and daughter, Dane rushed into a marriage with telephone operator supervisor Emma Awilda Peabody Sawyer, seven years his senior. The couple married on 8 March 1924, and separated on 30 September 1924.

In June 1928, Dane reportedly fell in love with a Russian dancer, Thais Valdemar. The couple began dating and eventually claimed to be married though they indeed never were (many sources incorrectly state that she was his legal wife). The couple lived together at Dane's Beverly Hills home, until November 1928, when Valdemar moved out. By December, she filed a breach of promise suit against Dane for $75,000, but the case was ultimately dropped in 1929.

== Later years and death ==
By the summer of 1933, Dane had given up on his film career and made a second attempt at mining. He spent three months driving up and down the West Coast trying to find a good mining deal. In September 1933, Dane lost $1,100 on a mining deal that failed to gain traction and advance. Deeply depressed by this lack of success, Dane subsequently worked as a mechanic and as a carpenter, but he was unable to stay employed for an extended period.

In 1933, Dane began working as a waiter in a "tiny cafe" in Westwood, Los Angeles. According to Dane's biographer, Laura Petersen Balough, oft-told accounts that Dane "bought stake in a hot dog stand outside the gates of MGM Studios" which was supposedly shunned by his former co-workers are likely false. The "hot dog stand" or "hot dog cart" that is often referred to was actually similar to a luncheonette, a small, permanent structure that had a counter and seating for patrons. Dane eventually bought a stake in the cafe after the owner thought that having a former film star as a co-owner would drum up business. Dane's former comedy partner, George K. Arthur, mentioned Dane's final venture in his memoir:

Another man might have kidded and clowned and made a feature of being "mine host" in a restaurant, but when Karl opened his hot dog stand in Westwood his own feeling of despair must have been served across the counter with the hamburgers. People could not bear to watch it. So they didn't come to buy his hamburgers.

By 1934, Dane's restaurant venture had failed and he was once again unemployed and broke. He then tried to seek work as carpenter or as an extra at MGM and Paramount Pictures. He was reportedly turned down for extra work because his body type and look were too distracting.

On 13 April 1934, Dane was pickpocketed of all the money he had: $18. On 14 April, he was to meet his friend, Frances Leake, with whom he planned to see a movie. After he failed to show, Leake became worried. She went to his apartment (at 626 South Burnside Avenue) and with the assistance of the landlady, they were able to open the door. There they found Dane, dead of a self-inflicted gunshot wound to the head, in his chair with a gun at his feet. Leake fainted at the scene. When she was revived, Leake found Dane's suicide note on a nearby table, next to a scrapbook filled with memorabilia, including photos, reviews and contracts, from his acting career. The note read, "To Frances and all my friends-goodbye."

Neither friends nor relatives came forward to claim Karl Dane's body. Police tagged his body with the note, "May have relatives in Denmark. Hold for awhile." For the next few days, authorities attempted to find his family, even placing ads in major Copenhagen newspapers. However, the Gottliebs did not find out about Dane's death until weeks later. Fellow Danish actor Jean Hersholt stepped forward and insisted that MGM should pay for a funeral and burial. MGM agreed and, on 18 April, held a public funeral for Dane. There were around fifty attendees. Hersholt was a pallbearer, as was Tom O'Brien. Dane was interred at the Hollywood Forever Cemetery. At the time of his death, Dane's estate was valued at $197.

== Legacy ==
Many of Dane's films still exist today and a few are available on DVD including Son of the Sheik, The Big Parade, and The Whispering Shadow. Bardelys the Magnificent was thought lost, but most of the film has been found. It has been restored and released on DVD. Of the 10 Dane & Arthur shorts, five still exist. Producer Robert Youngson included a sampling of the Dane & Arthur silent comedies in his feature film M-G-M's Big Parade of Comedy (1964).

Dane received a star on the Hollywood Walk of Fame for his contributions to film, which is located at 6140 Hollywood Blvd (located in front of the Henry Fonda Music Box Theater).

Renewed interest has been shown in Dane's career, especially in his native Denmark. On 12 October 2006, Danish weekly paper FOKUS published an article on Dane to commemorate what would have been his 120th birthday. In February 2007, an issue of the monthly Classic Images (#380) included an article on Dane. In the July 2007 biannual publication The Bridge (Volume 30 Number 1 2007), published by the Danish American Heritage Society, featured an article on Dane. In December 2007, the Danish Film Festival Kosmorama published an article about Dane in their newsletter.

On 28 January 2008, the Danish Film Institute held a 'Karl Dane Retrospective' in Copenhagen, Denmark. A speech was given by Laura Petersen Balogh and featured clips from Dane's films followed by a screening of one of his features. The event was attended by some of Dane's descendants. In 2009, a biography about Dane written by Balogh was released through McFarland & Company.

== Selected filmography ==
Year	Title	Role	Notes
1918	My Four Years in Germany	Chancellor von Bethmana-Hollweg	
1918	The Triumph of Venus	Mars	
1918	Her Final Reckoning	Prince Tcheretoff	
1918	To Hell with the Kaiser!	Von Hollweg	
1919	The Fall of the Hohenzollerns	Von Bethmann Hollweg	
1919	Daring Hearts	Lieutenant Von Bergheim	
1919	The Whirlwind	The Wolf	Lost film
1925	The Big Parade	Slim	
1925	Lights of Old Broadway	Roosevelt's Father	Alternative title: Little Old New York
1925	His Secretary	Janitor	
1926	La Bohème	Benoit	
1926	The Scarlet Letter	Master Giles	
1926	Bardelys the Magnificent	Rodenard	
1927	The Red Mill	Captain Jacop Van Goop	
1927	Slide, Kelly, Slide	Swede Hansen	
1927	Rookies	Sgt. Diggs	Dane & Arthur silent feature
1927	The Enemy	Jan	
1928	Baby Mine	Oswald Hardy	Dane & Arthur silent feature
1928	The Trail of '98	Lars Petersen	
1928	Circus Rookies	Oscar Thrust	Dane & Arthur silent feature
1928	Detectives	House Detective	Dane & Arthur silent feature
1928	Alias Jimmy Valentine	Swede	
1928	Brotherly Love	Oscar	Dane & Arthur silent feature
1929	The Duke Steps Out	Barney, Duke's Chauffeur	
1929	China Bound	Sharkey Nye	Dane & Arthur silent feature
1929	Speedway	Dugan	
1929	Navy Blues	Sven Swanson	
1929	The Hollywood Revue of 1929	Himself	Dane & Arthur guest appearance
1930	Montana Moon	Hank	
1930	The Big House	Olsen	
1930	Billy the Kid	Swenson	Alternative title: The Highwayman Rides
1931	A Put Up Job		Dane & Arthur sound short
1931	Dumbbells in Derbies		Dane & Arthur sound short
1931	Lime Juice Nights		Dane & Arthur sound short
1932	Fast Life	Olaf	Uncredited
1933	The Whispering Shadow	Sparks (dispatcher)	
