= Louise Fowler =

Louise Fowler may refer to:

- Louise Fowler (EastEnders)
- Louise Fowler, character in Across the Continent
