= Officer 666 =

Officer 666 may refer to:

- Officer 666 (1916 film), a silent film made in Australia
- Officer 666 (1920 film), an American silent comedy film
