= Ashes of Vengeance =

1923 film by Frank Lloyd

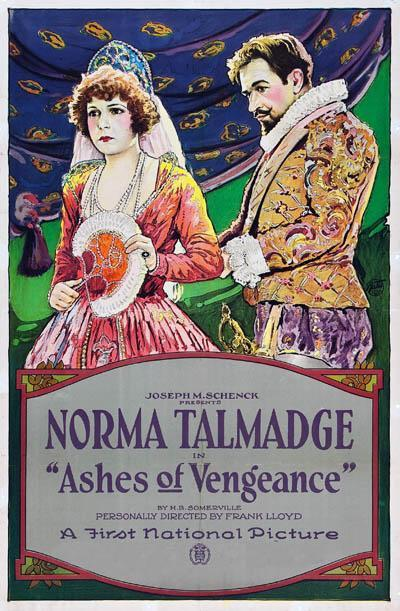
- Film poster with Norma Talmadge and Wallace Beery
- Directed by: Frank Lloyd
- Written by: Frank Lloyd
- Based on: Ashes of Vengeance by H.B. Somerville
- Produced by: Norma Talmadge; Joseph M. Schenck
- Starring: Norma Talmadge; Wallace Beery
- Cinematography: Tony Gaudio
- Edited by: Hal C. Kern
- Music by: Victor Schertzinger
- Production company: Norma Talmadge Film Co.
- Distributed by: First National Pictures (as Associated First National)
- Release date: August 6, 1923
- Running time: 120 minutes
- Country: United States
- Language: Silent (English intertitles)

Ashes of Vengeance is a 1923 American silent drama film directed by Frank Lloyd and starring Norma Talmadge and Wallace Beery.

== Plot ==
The film begins at the wedding ball in 1572 for King Henry of Navarre and his wife, Margaret of Valois. While at the ball, Catherine de' Medici, Margaret's mother persuades her son King Charles IX of France to sign a decree to exterminate the Huguenots.

At that same ball, the Comte de la Roche makes sexual advances towards Margot de Vaincoire, the fiancée of Rupert de Vrieac. The Catholic de la Roches and the Huguenot de Vrieacs have been enemies for years. The outraged Rupert challenges the Comte to a duel. Rupert wins the duel, but spares the Comte’s life. Rupert and Margot are Huguenots while the Comte is a Catholic of the Queen Mother’s party.

In the days after the wedding, thousands of Huguenots are murdered in Paris and throughout France. Catherine sends the Comte to kill Rupert. However, the Compte secretly takes him to hide at Margot’s house. The Comte then says that he will protect both Rupert and Margot if Rupert agrees to be his servant for five years. At the pleading of Margot, Rupert agrees.

The Comte takes Rupert to his castle, where he lives with his two sisters Yoeland and Anne de Breux. When the Catholic Yoeland discovers Rupert is a Huguenot, she despises him. One day, a captive wolf escapes and threatens the two sisters. Rupert jumps on it and fends it off with his bare hands. At that point, a grateful Yoeland starts feeling more positive about him.

Yoeland then travels to see her cousin Denise, with Rupert serving as Yoeland's escort. Denise's uncle, Louis de la Roches, is forcing her to marry the Duc de Tours. However Denise loves Phillipe de Vois, a poor nobleman. Rupert's servant Anton tells him that that Margot de Vaincoire has married someone else. The Duc of Tours arrives at the castle for his wedding. Denise’s father is called to Paris, leaving the Duc in charge.

The Duc is revealed as a drunken brute, terrorizing the peasants. He tries to rape a servant girl in the castle, killing her guardsman lover when he tries to intervene. The Duc also harasses Yoeland. Enraged by their comrade's murder, the guards set off to kill the Duc.

Despite his criminal actions, Yoeland feels obligated to protect the Duc as he is a guest. She persuades Rupert to rally a few loyal men to oppose the guards. He is wounded during the skirmish. During the battle, Father Paul, Denise’s confessor, escapes the battle and brings back Phillipe de Vois and his men to suppress the guard rebellion.

During the fight, Yoeland realizes she loves Rupert. However, while nursing his wounds, she finds a lock of blonde hair in Rupert's doublet. It makes her think that Rupert still loves Margot. Meanwhile, the vengeful Duc is torturing the servant girl and the dead Guardsman's lover. Yoeland forces him to stop.

At this point, the Duc decides that he wants to marry Yoeland, not Denise. He allows Phillipe de Vois and Denise to elope. The Duc then threatens to blind Rupert with a hot poker if Yoeland does not marry him. She agrees, but the guardsmen intervene to save them. Rupert and the Duc duel, but the servant girl kills the Duc by stabbing him in the back.

At Yoeland’s request, the Compte releases Rupert from his service as a servant. She then learns that the lock of hair came from Anne’s doll; her sister had given it to Rupert as a token of friendship. Yoeland and Rupert become engaged.

Copy of Ashes of Vengeance (1923)

== Cast ==
- Norma Talmadge as Yoeland de Breux
- Conway Tearle as Rupert de Vrieac
- Wallace Beery as Duc de Tours
- Josephine Crowell as Catherine de' Medici
- Betty Francisco as Margot de Vancoire
- Claire McDowell as Margot's Aunt
- Courtenay Foote as Comte de la Roche
- James Cooley as Paul
- George Beranger as Charles IX (credited as Andre de Beranger)
- Boyd Irwin as Duc de Guise
- Winter Hall as The Bishop
- William Clifford (actor) as André
- Murdock MacQuarrie as Carlotte
- Carmen Phillips as Marie
- Hector V. Sarno as Gallon
- Frank Leigh as Lupi
- Earl Schenck as Blais
- Mary McAllister as Denise
- Lucy Beaumont as Charlotte
- Forrest Robinson as Father Paul
- Kenneth Gibson as Phillipe
- Rush Hughes as Soldier Boy
- Howard Truesdale as Vicomte de Briege
- Jeanne Carpenter as Anne

== Preservation ==
A complete print of Ashes of Vengeance is maintained at the Library of Congress and a partial copy consisting of two reels is in the George Eastman Museum Motion Picture Collection.
