= Evelyn Francisco =

American actress

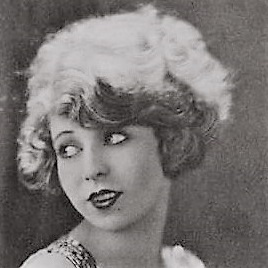
- Born: Evelyn Barton; August 13, 1904; Little Rock, Arkansas, U.S.
- Died: January 27, 1963 (aged 58); Corona, California, U.S.
- Occupation: Actress
- Years active: 1923–1929
- Spouse: Samuel Bernheim (died 1934)
- Relatives: Betty Francisco (sister)

Evelyn Francisco (née Barton; August 13, 1904 – January 27, 1963) was an American silent era film actress who began as a bathing beauty.

== Biography ==
Francisco was born in Arkansas on August 13, 1904. Her sisters Betty and Margaret Francisco were also actresses.

Barton began acting in 1923. In The Goof (1924), directed by William Beaudine, she is one of a number of beauties called Spike Malone's diving girls. The seven-reel farce featured former William Fox actress, Alta Allen, as the head of the troupe. Spike was played by Chuck Relaner. In 1924's Hollywood Follies, Francisco was one of Mack Sennett's Bathing Beauties who performed at the Philharmonic Auditorium. Led by Harry Langdon, Thelma Parr was another of the select group of Sennett females who presented an act called All Wet.

In August 1925, the Francisco sisters were presented together at the Greenwich Village Cafe in the Christie Hotel, in Hollywood. At the time Francisco had just completed an important role in the first production of Julian Eltinge for the Christie Studios, a film entitled Madame Behave (1925).

She wore a novelty bathing suit of Russian ermine for a fashion pageant held at the Hotel Vista del Arroyo in Pasadena, California, in February 1927. The garment was designed and made by Colburn's of South Flower Street in Los Angeles, California.

== Death ==
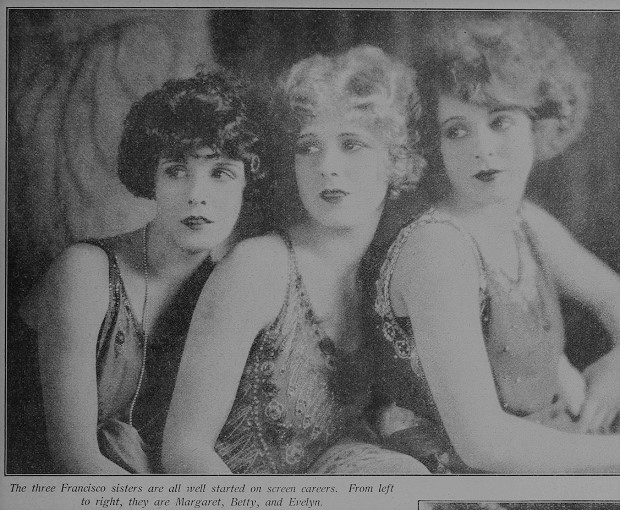
Margaret, Betty and Evelyn Francisco

Francisco died on January 27, 1963, in Corona, California.

== Partial filmography ==
- Picking Peaches (1924) *uncredited
- Madame Behave (1925)
- His First Flame (1927)
- King of the Herd (1927)
