= The House of Scandal =

1928 silent drama film

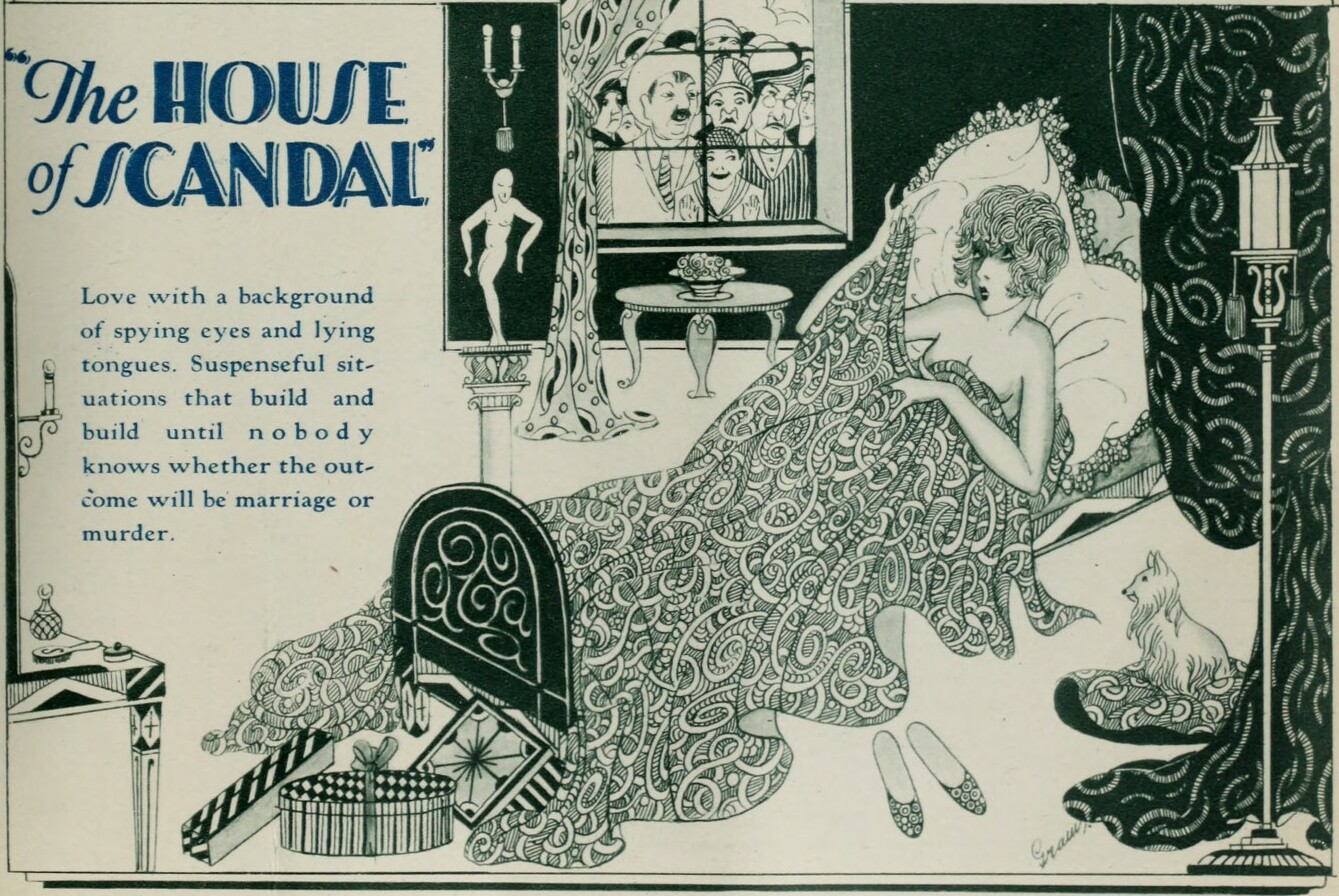
- Advertisement
- Directed by: King Baggot
- Written by: E. Morton Hough; Frances Hyland; Viola Brothers Shore
- Produced by: John M. Stahl
- Starring: Pat O'Malley; Dorothy Sebastian; Gino Corrado
- Cinematography: Barney McGill
- Edited by: Desmond O'Brien
- Production company: Tiffany Pictures
- Distributed by: Tiffany Pictures
- Release date: April 1, 1928
- Running time: 60 minutes
- Country: United States
- Language: Silent (English intertitles)

The House of Scandal is a 1928 American silent drama film directed by King Baggot and starring Pat O'Malley, Dorothy Sebastian and Gino Corrado.

== Cast ==
- Pat O'Malley as Pat Regan
- Dorothy Sebastian as Ann Rourke
- Harry Murray as Danny Regan
- Gino Corrado as Morgan
- Lee Shumway as The Butler
- Jack Singleton as A Man About Town
- Ida Darling as Mrs. Chatterton
- Lydia Knott as Mrs. Rourke

== Preservation ==
With no prints of The House of Scandal located in any film archives, it is a lost film.

== Bibliography ==
- Munden, Kenneth White. The American Film Institute Catalog of Motion Pictures Produced in the United States, Part 1. University of California Press, 1997.
