= Norah Davis =

American novelist (1861–1936)

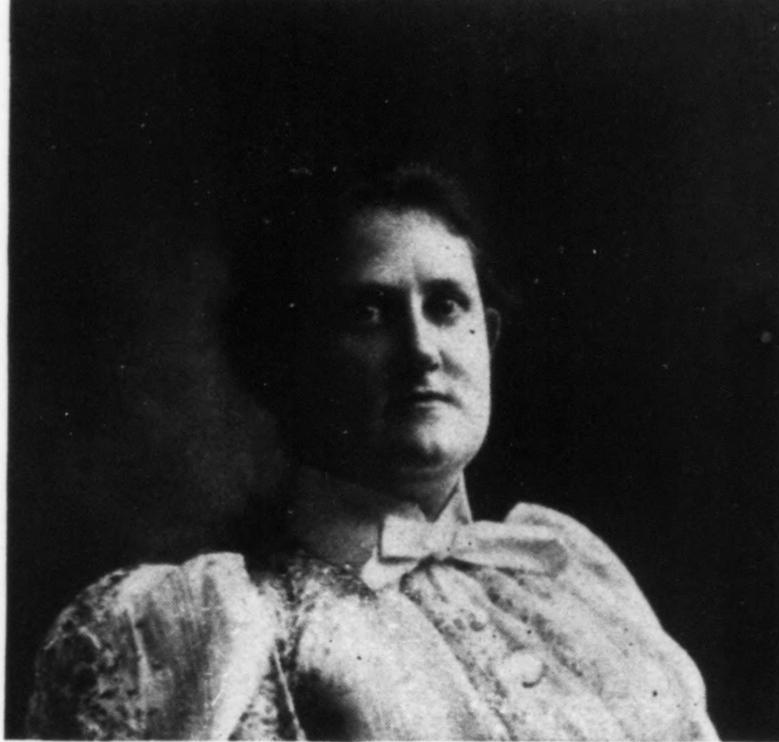
- Davis in 1906
- Born: Norah Clinton Davis; 1861 Huntsville, Alabama, U.S.
- Died: June 7, 1936 (aged 74–75) Huntsville, Alabama, U.S.
- Occupation: Novelist

Norah Clinton Davis (1861 – June 7, 1936) was an American novelist. She wrote four novels, mostly about life in the southern United States. Beyond her novels, Davis worked as a teacher, in newspapers, and as a court reporter.

Davis wrote three novels in quick succession between 1905 and 1909. Her fourth and apparently final novel was published in 1920. Several of these contrast and juxtapose the lives of northerners and southerners. All include romantic themes. Her first work, The Northerner (1905), received the most critical attention. Her fourth and final novel, The Other Woman (1920), was adapted into a 1921 silent film of the same name.

== Life ==
Norah Clinton Davis was born in 1861 in Huntsville, Alabama, to Williametta (Eason) and Zebulon Pike Davis. (Note: Some sources indicate a birth date in 1878. However, Hutchens notes that she obtained a voter registration card for Davis from the Madison County probate office which shows a birth date in 1861.) She was educated by tutors in her father's home, in private schools, and in a school in Lebanon, Ohio.

Between 1893 and 1900, she taught in public schools in Alabama (including Huntsville and Decatur), Florida, Mississippi, Tennessee, and Arkansas.

She later became a court reporter and newspaper writer. As a court reporter, she "made her way all over the South from Key West to the Ozark Mountains". From 1901 to 1905, she was the deputy clerk of the United States District Court for the Northern District of Alabama.

Davis lived in Huntsville nearly all her life, and she died there on June 7, 1936, at her home, 437 McClung Street.

== Work ==
=== The Northerner (1905) ===
In The Northerner (1905), a novel of the New South, the protagonist is a northern capitalist named Falls who settles in Alabama as the owner and manager of the street railway and lighting plant of a small town. He had a romantic entanglement with a mulatto woman when he was young, fathering a child named "Rosebud", and is wracked with guilt about his early years. The locals dislike him. This leads to his social ostracism and a conspiracy to ruin his business, and the wrecking of his establishment. The novel includes a lynching scene.

The novel takes a dim view of miscegenation, as Sterling Allen Brown noted: "Miscegenation is a great concern of the author, who calls it the 'Curse of Dixie', 'The Nameless Shame', 'The Hidden Pain'". The protagonist Falls "loathes" Rosebud, whom Brown describes as his "quadroon" daughter. A contemporary review in The Baltimore Sun viewed the novel as a "vindictive assault upon the social and business honor of the entire South" because of its negative depictions of southern businesspeople. The review goes on to suggest that, in the view of Northerner, most white men in the south engaged in "intimacy" with black women, creating a "history of lust" which hurt white women.

=== The World's Warrant (1907) ===
The World's Warrant (1907) was published on April 27, 1907. Davis wrote the novel in 28 days. Though not as a widely reviewed as Northerner, it went into a fourth printing. It is set in New Decatur, Alabama. In the novel, the northern friends of a southern woman seek to marry her to a man who advertises for a wife. One of the northern girls writes him letters on her friend's behalf. In the result, the advertising man, coming down south incognito to look things over, falls in love with the writer while professing love for the person she writes for.

A contemporary review in The State noted World's Warrant described "social changes made by the sudden incoming of Northern people and capital for the development of the natural resources of the South".

=== Wallace Rhodes (1909) ===
Wallace Rhodes: A Novel (1909) was published by Houghton & Mifflin around April 1909. It is a convoluted romance.

The novel is mainly set in Issaqueena, a village in the Mississippi Delta. The main characters are Wallace Rhodes, his son Quincey, and a woman, Veronica Bowdre. Wallace has a low view of Veronica. Quincey is engaged to Veronica. Wallace marries Veronica during Quincey's absence, as a result of a plan gone wrong. Veronica turns out to be lovable, not at all as Wallace thought her initially. She falls in love with Wallace. In the end, Wallace and Quincey reconcile, which brings Wallace out of his cynicism.

William Morton Payne, reviewing Wallace Rhodes in The Dial, wrote that the plot was too confusing to make a satisfactory novel: "The scene of this preposterous story is a Southern plantation on the Mississippi River. It is skilfully constructed, and shows not a little command of novelistic technique. But no technical merits could make such a plot convincing, or awaken much sympathy for any of the persons concerned."

=== The Other Woman (1920) ===
The Other Woman (1920), about a businessman with a split personality, appears to be Davis's final work. According to a report in the Chicago Tribune, its plot was based on a trial Davis watched when she was a court clerk. She saw a man convicted of bigamy although he had no intent to do wrong. Another contemporary report states that Davis personally knew the man on whom the main character, Langdon Kirven, is based and that the real-life counterpart went to prison—and then escaped, living as a fugitive.

Other Woman was turned into a silent film of the same name, which premiered on May 3, 1921.

Unusual psychological phenomena appear to have been of interest to Davis for several years. In 1913, she wrote to the Birmingham Post-Herald regarding a case report of a boy with amnesia. She advised that the boy be put under hypnosis to treat his condition and cited the work of William James and Boris Sidis in support of her view.

== Novels ==
- The Northerner. New York: Grosset & Dunlap. 1905.
- The World's Warrant. Boston: Houghton Mifflin. 1907.
- Wallace Rhodes: A Novel. New York: Harper & Brothers. 1909.
- The Other Woman. New York: The Century Company. 1920.

== Works cited ==
- Hutchens, Eleanor Newman (1983). "Norah Davis 1861–1936". The Huntsville Historical Review. 13. Huntsville–Madison County Historical Society: 21–29. ISSN 1048-3152.
