= Charles Sullivan (actor) =

American actor

- Charles Sullivan in Destination Tokyo 1943
- Born: April 24, 1899; Monroe, Louisiana, Louisiana, United States
- Died: June 25, 1972 (aged 73); Los Angeles, California, United States
- Occupation: Actor
- Years active: 1925–1958

Charles Sullivan (April 24, 1899 – June 25, 1972), also known as Charlie Sullivan, was an American character actor who was born just before the turn of the 20th century on April 24, 1899. He would begin his acting career at the age of 25, in the silent film, His People (1925). Over his highly prolific 30-plus-year career some sources have him appearing in over 500 films, while the American Film Institute credits him with appearing in over 250 films.

== Selected filmography ==
Year	Title	Role	Notes
1926	Behind the Front	Soldier	
1928	The Noose	Head Waiter	uncredited
1929	The Spirit of Youth	Prizefighter	
1929	Spite Marriage	Tough Sailor	uncredited
1930	Safety in Numbers	Taxicab Driver	uncredited
1941	The Bride Came C.O.D.	Ambulance Driver	uncredited
1945	Girls of the Big House	Waiter	
1956	Hollywood or Bust	Audience Member	Final Martin & Lewis comedy; uncredited
