= Sidney D'Albrook =

American actor (1886–1948)

- Born: Sidney Dahlbruck; May 3, 1886; Chicago, Illinois, U.S.
- Died: May 30, 1948 (aged 62)
- Occupation: Actor

Sidney D'Albrook (May 3, 1886 – May 30, 1948) was an American actor.

He was born in Chicago, Illinois, a son of Harry Dahlbruck, a musician, and Jennie McGuire. He was working as an actor in Davenport, Iowa, in 1910, living with his sister Ruth and his mother Jennie. He did films in New York in the teens, and then they moved to Hollywood in 1920. At this point his brother Hal or Harold lived with them for a time. He worked in films until his death, did many character parts. His sister Ruth was an extra in movies and in the television series Gunsmoke and Garrison's Gorillas.

D'Albrook was active in the Men's Sodality of the Church of the Blessed Sacrament in Hollywood. He died in 1948. His large collection of movie material was donated to the County of Los Angeles Hollywood Museum after his death by his sister Ruth, in 1962.

== Partial filmography ==
- All for a Girl (1915) as Prince De Cauchy
- The Gilded Cage (1916)
- Draft 258 (1917)
- Two Little Imps (1917)
- God's Man (1917)
- The Bitter Truth (1917)
- The Dancer's Peril (1917)
- Heart of the Wilds (1918)
- Life's Greatest Problem (1918)
- With Neatness and Dispatch (1918)
- The Challenge Accepted (1918)
- Three Men and a Girl (1919)
- The Lost Battalion (1919)
- Roman Candles (1920)
- The Flaming Clue (1920)
- The Right Way (1921)
- Big Game (1921)
- A Motion to Adjourn (1921)
- The Son of Wallingford (1921)
- Little Miss Smiles (1922)
- Across the Continent (1922)
- The Fighting Guide (1922)
- West of Chicago (1922)
- The Call of the Wild (1923)
- Without Mercy (1925)
- So This Is Paris (1926)
- The Princess from Hoboken (1927)
- The King of Kings (1927)
- The Spirit of Youth (1929)
- Captain of the Guard (1930)
- Call of the Flesh (1930)
- The 13th Man (1937)
- Prescription for Romance (1937)
- Boots of Destiny (1937)
