= Morgan's Last Raid =

1929 film

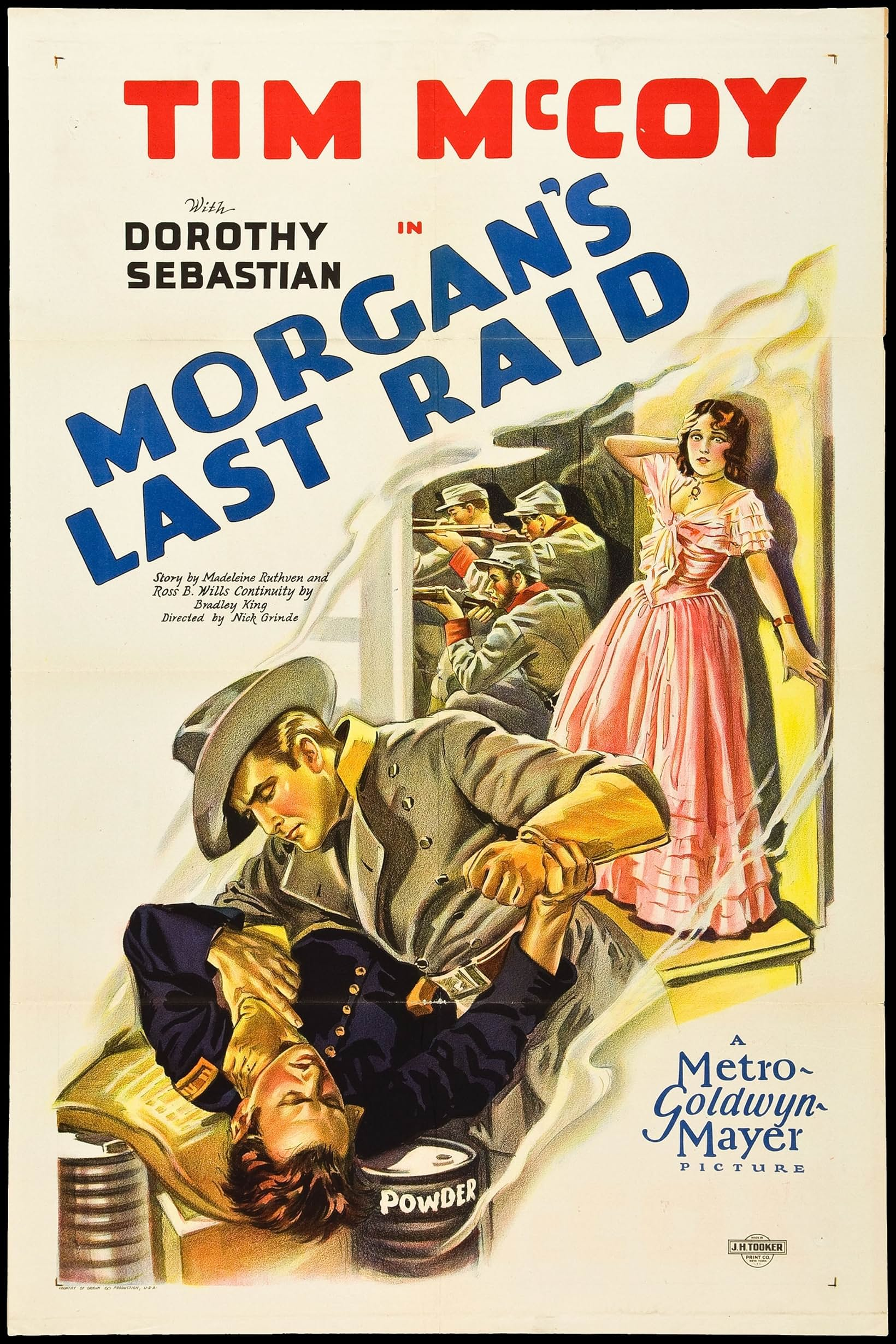
- Theatrical release poster
- Directed by: Nick Grinde
- Screenplay by: Harry Braxton; Bradley King
- Story by: Madeleine Ruthven; Ross B. Wills
- Starring: Tim McCoy; Dorothy Sebastian; Wheeler Oakman; Al Ernest Garcia; Hank Mann
- Cinematography: Arthur Reed
- Edited by: William LeVanway
- Production company: Metro-Goldwyn-Mayer
- Distributed by: Metro-Goldwyn-Mayer
- Release date: January 5, 1929
- Running time: 60 minutes
- Country: United States
- Languages: Silent; English intertitles

Morgan's Last Raid is a lost 1929 American silent Western film directed by Nick Grinde and written by Harry Braxton and Bradley King. The film stars Tim McCoy, Dorothy Sebastian, Wheeler Oakman, Al Ernest Garcia and Hank Mann. The film was released on January 5, 1929, by Metro-Goldwyn-Mayer.

== Cast ==
- Tim McCoy as Capt. Daniel Clairbourne
- Dorothy Sebastian as Judith Rogers
- Wheeler Oakman as John Bland
- Al Ernest Garcia as Morgan
- Hank Mann as Tex
- C. Montague Shaw as Gen. Rogers

== See also ==
- List of films and television shows about the American Civil War
