= The Spirit of Youth =

1929 film

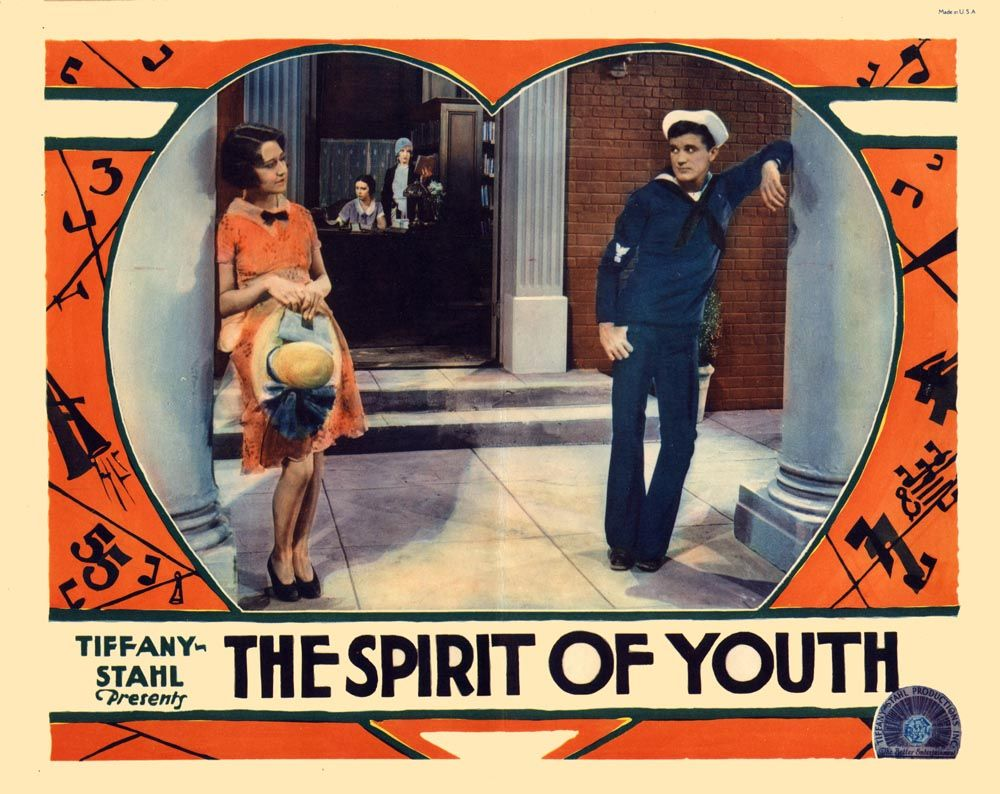
- Directed by: Walter Lang
- Written by: Elmer Blaney Harris; Eve Unsell
- Starring: Dorothy Sebastian
- Production company: Tiffany Pictures
- Release date: February 15, 1929
- Running time: 67 minutes
- Country: United States
- Language: Silent

The Spirit of Youth is a 1929 American silent drama film directed by Walter Lang. A complete print of the film exists.

== Cast ==
- Dorothy Sebastian as Betty Grant
- Larry Kent as Jim Kenney
- Betty Francisco as Claire Ewing
- Maurice Murphy as Ted Ewing
- Anita Louise as Toodles Ewing (as Anita Fremault)
- Donald Hall as Mr. Ewing
- Douglas Gilmore as Hal Loring
- Charles Sullivan as Prizefighter
- Sidney D'Albrook as Fight Promoter
