= The Heart Line =

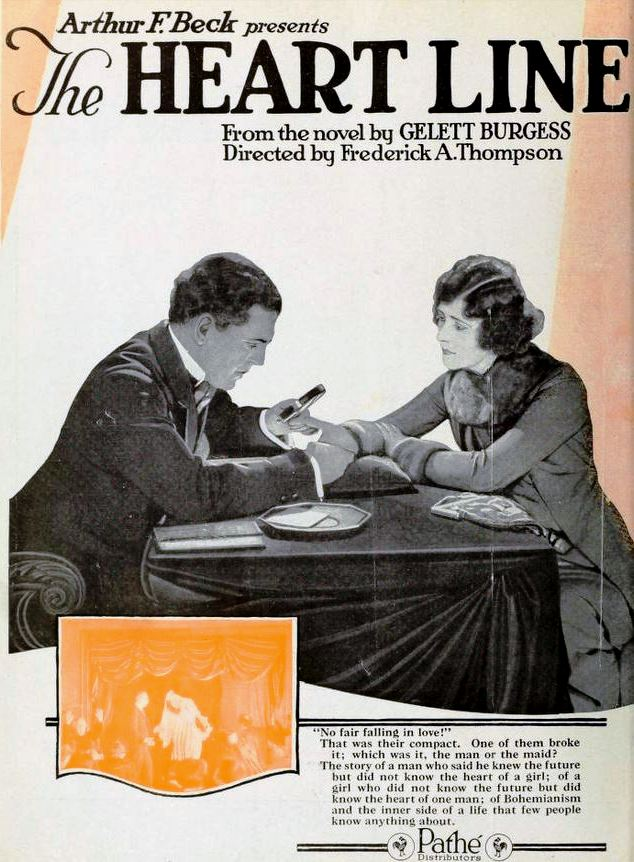
- Directed by: Frederick A. Thomson
- Written by: Gelett Burgess; George Elwood Jenks
- Produced by: Leah Baird; Arthur F. Beck
- Starring: Leah Baird; Jerome Patrick; Frederick Vroom
- Cinematography: George Barnes
- Production company: Leah Baird Productions
- Distributed by: Pathe Exchange
- Release date: June 5, 1921
- Running time: 60 minutes
- Country: United States
- Languages: Silent; English intertitles

The Heart Line is a 1921 American silent drama film directed by Frederick A. Thomson and starring Leah Baird, Jerome Patrick and Frederick Vroom.

== Cast ==
- Leah Baird as Fancy Gray
- Jerome Patrick as Francis Granthope
- Frederick Vroom as Oliver Payson
- Ruth Cummings as Clytie Payson
- Ivor McFadden as Big Dougal
- Philip Sleeman as Gay P. Summers
- Mrs. Charles Craig as Madame Spoll
- Martin Best as Blanchard Cayley
- Ben Alexander as The Child

== Bibliography ==
- Goble, Alan. The Complete Index to Literary Sources in Film. Walter de Gruyter, 1999.
