= Her First Elopement =

1920 film directed by Sam Wood

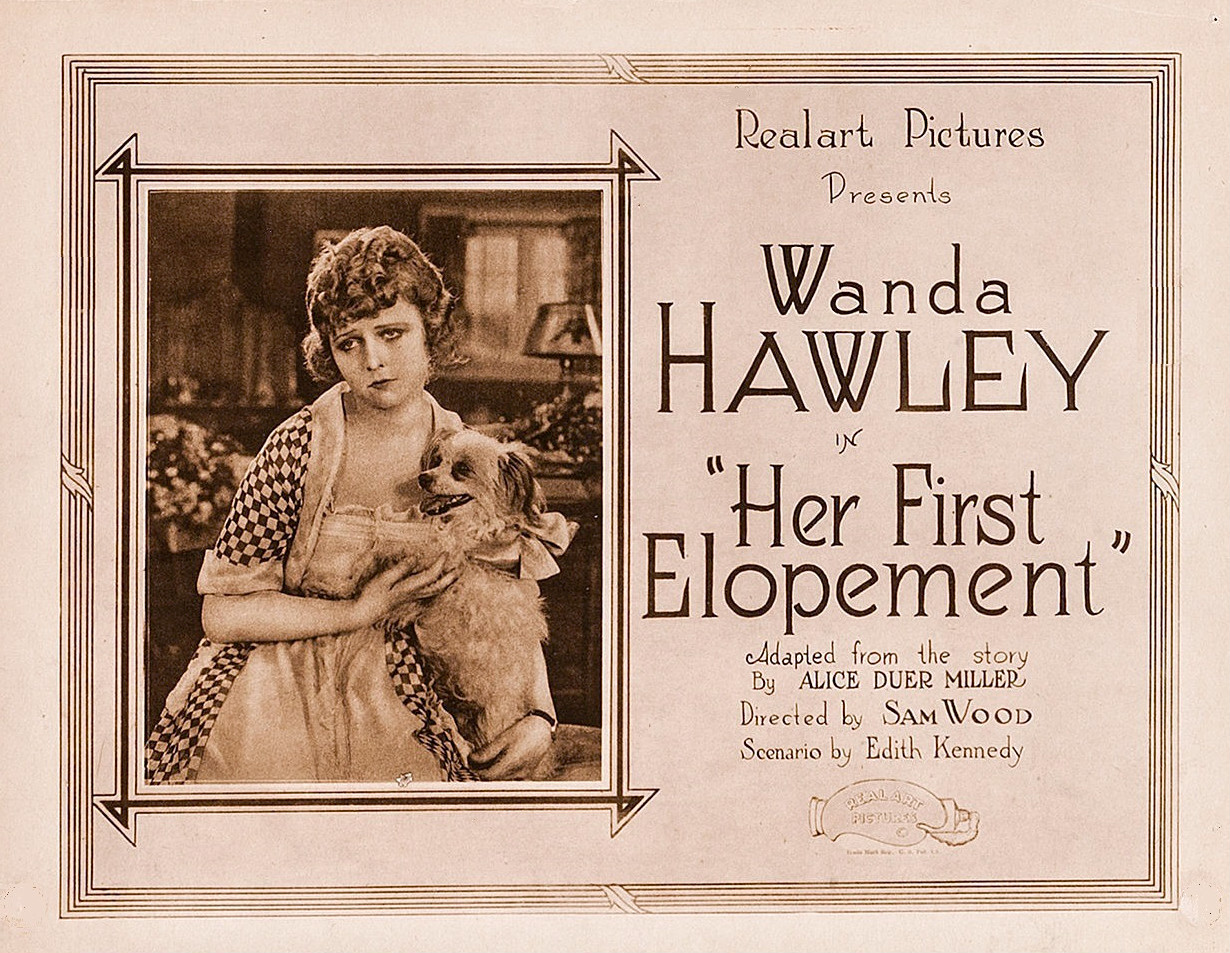
- Lobby card
- Directed by: Sam Wood
- Screenplay by: Edith Kennedy
- Story by: Alice Duer Miller
- Based on: Her First Elopement by Alice Duer Miller
- Starring: Wanda Hawley; Jerome Patrick; Nell Craig; Lucien Littlefield; Jay Eaton; Helen Dunbar
- Cinematography: Alfred Gilks
- Production company: Realart Pictures Corporation
- Distributed by: Realart Pictures Corporation
- Release date: December 1920
- Running time: 50 minutes
- Country: United States
- Language: Silent (English intertitles)

Her First Elopement is a 1920 American silent drama film directed by Sam Wood and written by Edith M. Kennedy. It is based on the 1915 novel Her First Elopement by Alice Duer Miller. The film stars Wanda Hawley, Jerome Patrick, Nell Craig, Lucien Littlefield, Jay Eaton, and Helen Dunbar. The film was released in December 1920, by Realart Pictures Corporation.

== Cast ==
- Wanda Hawley as Christina Elliott
- Jerome Patrick as Adrian Maitland
- Nell Craig as Lotta St. Regis
- Lucien Littlefield as Ted Maitland
- Jay Eaton as Gerald Elliott
- Helen Dunbar as Letitia Varden
- Herbert Standing as John Varden
- Edwin Stevens as Mr. Maitland Sr.
- Margaret Morris as Bettie Carlisle
- Ann Hastings as Trixie
- John McKinnon as Captain Hardy

== Preservation status ==
A print of Her First Elopement exists in the Museum of Modern Art collection in New York.
