= Betty Francisco =

American actress (1900–1950)

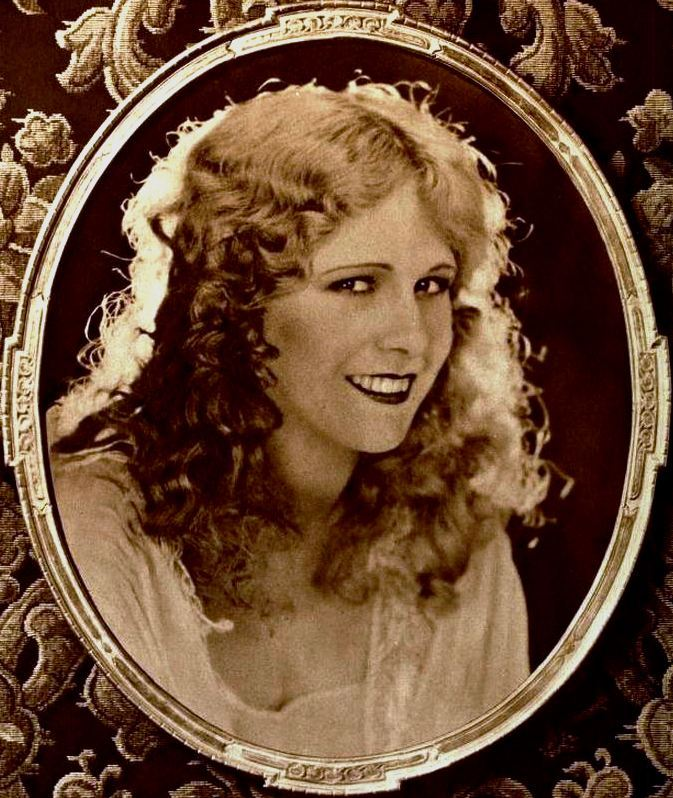
- Betty Francisco in 1922
- Born: Elizabeth Barton; September 26, 1900; Little Rock, Arkansas, U.S.
- Died: November 25, 1950 (aged 50); El Cerrito, Riverside, California, U.S.
- Burial place: Forest Lawn Memorial Park
- Occupation: Actress
- Years active: 1920–1934
- Spouse: Fred Spradling (m. 1930)
- Relatives: Evelyn Francisco (sister)

Betty Francisco (born Elizabeth Barton; September 26, 1900 – November 25, 1950) was an American silent-film actress, appearing primarily in supporting roles. Her sisters Evelyn and Margaret were also actresses.

== Early years ==
Francisco was born in Little Rock, Arkansas. As a child, she acted in stock theater companies. When she was older, she became an artists' model.

== Career ==
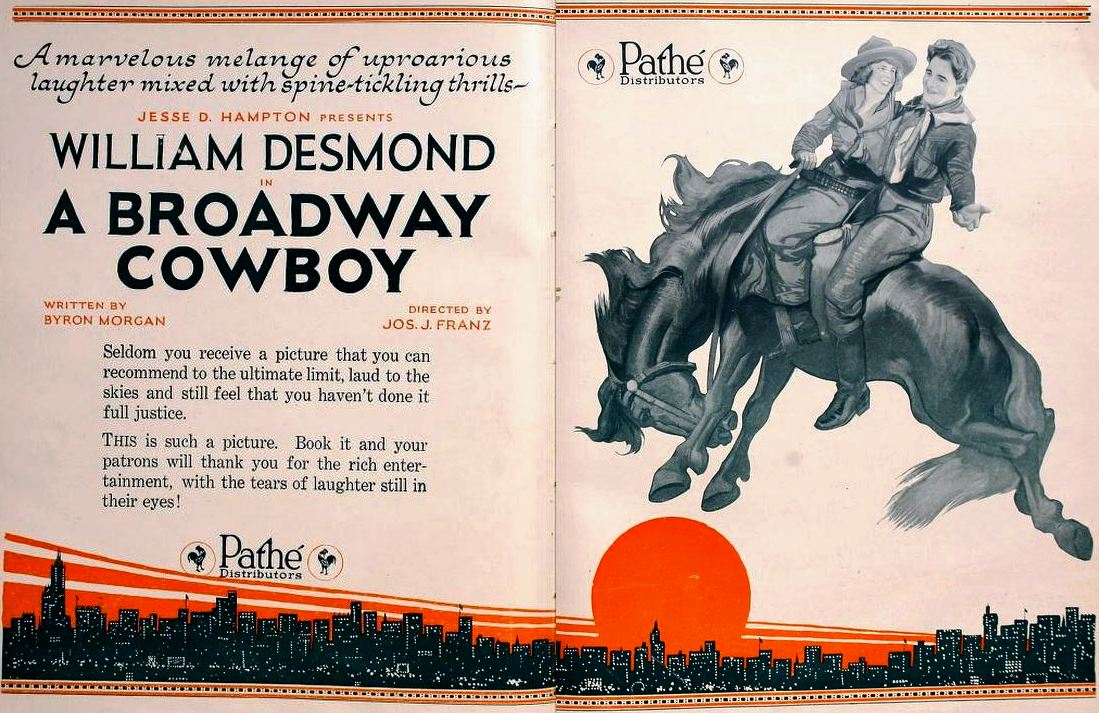

Francisco is credited in more than 50 films from 1920 to 1934, after which it appears she retired from motion picture acting. Her first film credit was in the 1920 film A Broadway Cowboy.

Selected as one of the WAMPAS Baby Stars in 1923, she nevertheless continued to be cast in secondary roles and rarely played the lead. She was often cast as the "other woman", as in Across the Continent (1922), Fair Play (1925), and The Spirit of Youth (1929). Her work included a wide range of genres; in 1923, for example, she was cast in the costume drama Ashes of Vengeance, the contemporary melodrama Flaming Youth, and the western Double Dealing. She is seen in the Harry Langdon comedy Long Pants (1927).

Her career continued into the sound era. She appears in some of the earliest movie musicals: Broadway (1929), Smiling Irish Eyes (1929), and Cecil B. DeMille's Madam Satan (1930). Her last film was Romance in the Rain (1934).

== Personal life ==
In 1930, Francisco married Fred Spradling, a stock broker.

She died at her Corona ranch on November 25, 1950, at 50 years old and was interred at the Forest Lawn Memorial Park cemetery in Glendale, California.

== Partial filmography ==
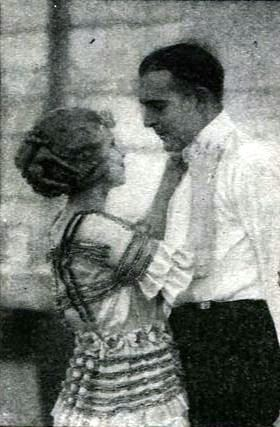
Betty Francisco with Wallace Reid, c. 1921

- A Broadway Cowboy (1920)
- The Furnace (1920)
- Greater Than Love (1921)
- Straight from Paris (1921)
- A Guilty Conscience (1921)
- Midsummer Madness (1921)
- Across the Continent (1922)
- Her Night of Nights (1922)
- Double Dealing (1923)
- Ashes of Vengeance (1923)
- The Old Fool (1923)
- Poor Men's Wives (1923)
- Crinoline and Romance (1923)
- Flaming Youth (1923)
- A Noise in Newboro (1923)
- The Love Piker (1923)
- Maytime (1923)
- Gambling Wives (1924)
- The Wife of the Centaur (1924)
- Big Timber (1924)
- East of Broadway (1924)
- On Probation (1924)
- How to Educate a Wife (1924)
- Jimmie's Millions (1925)
- Wasted Lives (1925)
- Fair Play (1925)
- Private Affairs (1925)
- Seven Keys to Baldpate (1925)
- Irene (1926)
- Don Juan's Three Nights (1926)
- The Phantom of the Forest (1926)
- The Gingham Girl (1927)
- Long Pants (1927)
- Too Many Crooks (1927)
- The Gay Retreat (1927)
- Queen of the Chorus (1928)
- The Spirit of Youth (1929)
- Broadway (1929)
- Smiling Irish Eyes (1929)
- Street of Chance (1930)
- Madam Satan (1930)
- The Widow from Chicago (1930)
- Charlie Chan Carries On (1931)
- Romance in the Rain (1934)
