= Three Men and a Girl =

1919 film by Marshall Neilan

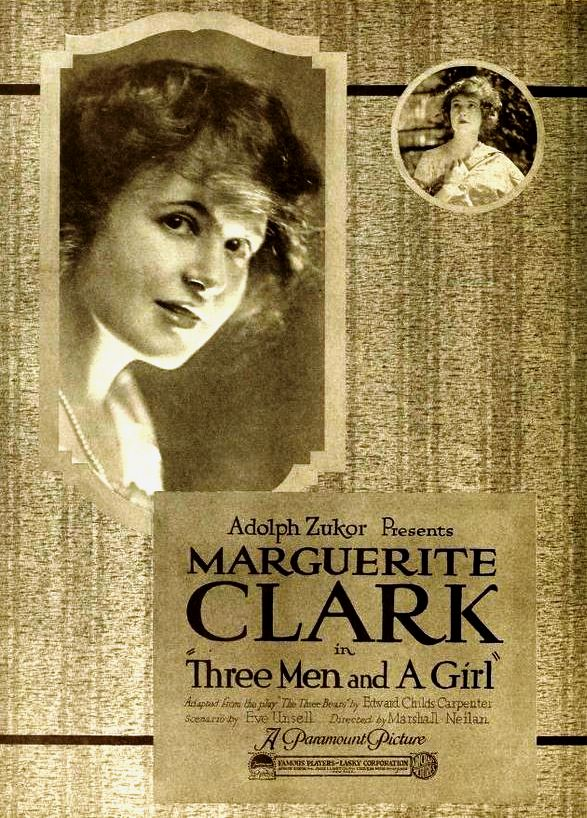
- Advertisement
- Directed by: Marshall Neilan
- Written by: Eve Unsell (scenario)
- Based on: The Three Bears by Edward Childs Carpenter
- Produced by: Adolph Zukor; Jesse L. Lasky
- Starring: Marguerite Clark; Richard Barthelmess; Percy Marmont; Jerome Patrick
- Cinematography: Henry Cronjager
- Distributed by: Paramount Pictures
- Release date: March 30, 1919
- Running time: 50 minutes
- Country: United States
- Language: Silent

Three Men and a Girl is a lost 1919 American silent romantic comedy film directed by Marshall Neilan and starring Marguerite Clark. It was produced by Famous Players–Lasky and distributed by Paramount Pictures. The film is based on the off-Broadway play The Three Bears by Edward Childs Carpenter.

== Plot ==
As described in a film magazine, Sylvia Weston is a capricious young woman who says "I do NOT" when she leaves a rich groom at the altar. She runs away in her bridal gown to a bungalow she owns at Loon Lake, only to find it occupied by three men with grudges against women. They expel her and her old nurse to a nearby cabin and stake out a line over which the women are not to cross. One by one the three men come to love Sylvia. The two older men, thinking that she is unhappily married, propose to adopt her and provide her with some clothes other than her bridal gown and swimming suit, which is all she has at the cabin. The younger one, however, is wiser and wins her in the end.

== Cast ==
- Marguerite Clark as Sylvia Weston
- Richard Barthelmess as Christopher Kent
- Percy Marmont as Dr. Henry Forsyth
- Jerome Patrick as Julius Vanneman
- Ida Darling as Theresa Jenkins
- Charles Craig as Dallas Hawkins
- Sidney D'Albrook as Guide
- Betty Bouton as Mrs. Julia Draper
- Maggie Fisher as Abbey (credited as Maggie H. Fisher)

== Preservation ==
With no holdings located in archives, Three Men and a Girl is considered a lost film.
