= Jimmie's Millions =

1925 film

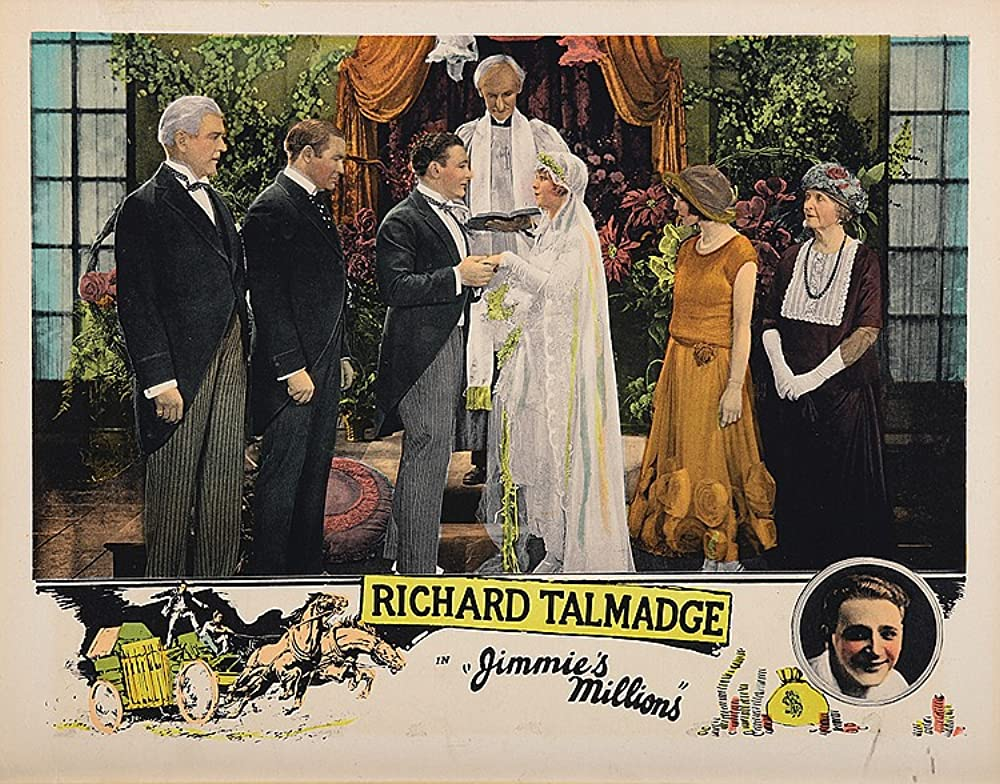
- Directed by: James P. Hogan
- Written by: Frank Howard Clark; John A. Moroso
- Starring: Richard Talmadge; Betty Francisco; Charles Clary
- Cinematography: William Marshall
- Edited by: Doane Harrison
- Production companies: Carlos Productions; Truart Film Corporation
- Distributed by: Film Booking Offices of America
- Release date: March 1, 1925
- Running time: 60 minutes
- Country: United States
- Language: Silent (English intertitles)

Jimmie's Millions is a 1925 American silent action film directed by James P. Hogan and starring Richard Talmadge, Betty Francisco, and Charles Clary.

== Plot ==
As described in a film magazine review, Jimmie Wicherly is named as heir to his uncle's millions provided he reports promptly at a designated hour each day for three months. Jealous relatives attempt to get him out of the way, and trump up charges of murder against him. He proves the supposed dead man is alive and exposes the villain. He wins the millions and the hand of an attractive young woman.

== Cast ==
- Richard Talmadge as Jimmie Wicherly
- Betty Francisco as Susan Jane Montague
- Charles Clary as Luther Ball
- Brinsley Shaw as John Saunders
- Dick Sutherland as William Johnson
- Ina Anson as Patience Delavan
- Lee Moran as Speck Donnelly
- Wade Boteler as Mick Flannagan

== Bibliography ==
- Munden, Kenneth White. The American Film Institute Catalog of Motion Pictures Produced in the United States, Part 1. University of California Press, 1997.
