= Jay Eaton =

American actor (1899–1970)

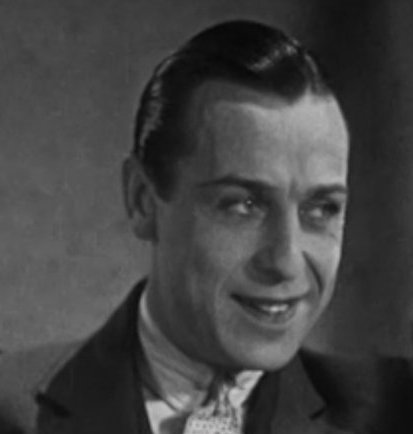
- Born: March 17, 1899; Union, New Jersey, United States
- Died: February 5, 1970 (aged 70); Hollywood, California, United States
- Occupation: Actor
- Years active: 1920–52

Jay Eaton (March 17, 1899 – February 5, 1970) was an American character actor whose career spanned both the silent and sound film eras.

== Biography ==
Born on March 17, 1899, in Union, New Jersey, Eaton entered the film industry with a featured role in the 1920 silent film Her First Elopement. Over the next 32 years, according to some sources, he would appear in almost 200 films, usually in smaller uncredited roles, or as a background extra.

During the course of his career, he would appear in many notable films, including: Stage Mother (1933), Morning Glory (1933), A Night at the Opera (1935), Mr. Deeds Goes to Town (1936), Cover Girl (1944), Rhapsody in Blue (1945), Brewster's Millions (1945), The Big Sleep (1946), The Blue Dahlia (1946), The Kid from Brooklyn (1946), The Fuller Brush Man (1948), The Fountainhead (1949), and Young Man with a Horn (1950). His final appearance would be in William Wyler's 1952 film, Carrie, which stars Laurence Olivier and Jennifer Jones.

Eaton died on February 5, 1970, at the age of 70, and was buried at Forest Lawn Memorial Park in Glendale, California.

== Partial filmography ==
- Her First Elopement (1920)
- Where Lights Are Low (1921)
- The Noose (1928)
- Lady Be Good (1928)
- Three-Ring Marriage (1928)
- Man-Made Women (1928)
- Synthetic Sin (1929)
- Children of Pleasure (1930)
- Sunny (1930)
- The Last Flight (1931)
- Faithless (1932)
- Cocktail Hour (1933)
- Stage Mother (1933)
- The Affairs of Cellini (1934)
- To Mary - with Love (1936)
- Michael O'Halloran (1937)
- Second Honeymoon (1937)
- Blondie Plays Cupid (1940)
- It Happened in Flatbush (1942)
- It's in the Bag! (1945)
- Carrie (1952)
