= Jerome Patrick =

American actor

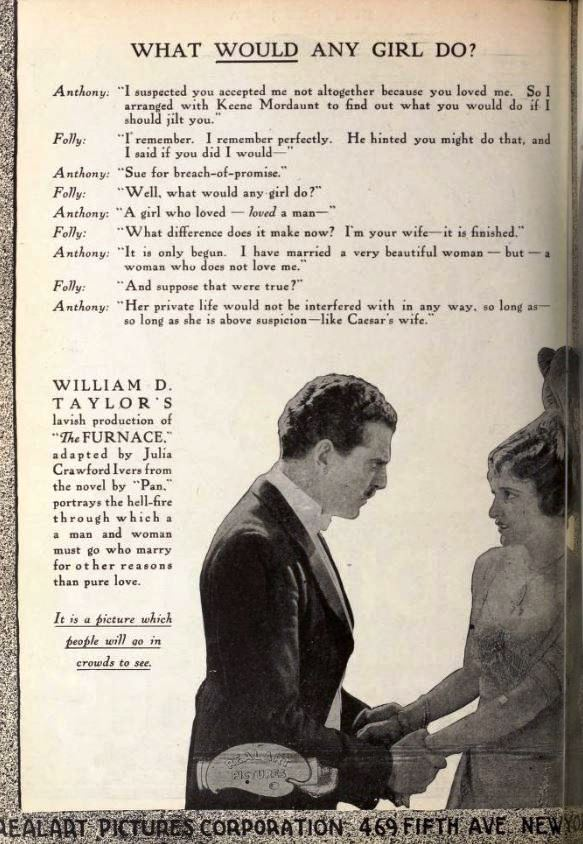
- Advertisement for The Furnace (1920) with Jerome Patrick and Agnes Ayres
- Born: June 1, 1882; Dunedin, New Zealand
- Died: September 26, 1923 (aged 41); New York City, New York, U.S.
- Occupation: Actor
- Years active: 1913–1924
- Spouse: Grey Brunelle

Jerome Patrick (June 2, 1883 – September 26, 1923) was a New Zealand born American stage and film actor. Born Alexander Patrick, he worked as a dentist while acting locally and in Australia, where in 1912 he married Ethel Joan Meynelle, the daughter of a prominent Australian theatrical manager. He then moved to the US in 1914 and also spent time in Toronto, where he signed up for the Canadian Expeditionary Force during World War One (noting he had previously served four years with the New Zealand Hussars. He was discharged after 'several' nervous breakdowns, the doctor noting a previous heroin addiction and unstable nervous system, although completely abstaining from alcohol.

He made more of a name for himself on the Broadway stage before coming to films rather late at 36 in 1919. He appeared in 10 films between 1919 and 1924.

His final New York appearance was in the 1923 stage version of Zander the Great with Alice Brady. The play was later made into an MGM silent with Marion Davies.

He was born in New Zealand and died in New York, New York of 'nervous disorders'. His spouse was named Grey Brunelle.

== Filmography ==
- Three Men and a Girl (1919)
- Officer 666 (1920)
- The Furnace (1920)
- Her First Elopement (1921)
- The Other Woman (1921)
- The Heart Line (1921)
- Don't Call Me Little Girl (1921)
- Forever (1921)
- School Days (1921)
- Sinners in Silk (1924)
