= Dorothy Sebastian =

American actress (1903–1957)

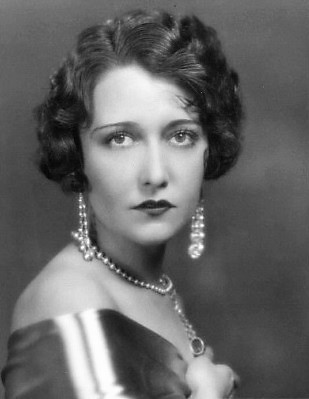
- Sebastian in 1930s
- Born: Stella Dorothy Sabiston; April 26, 1903; Birmingham, Alabama, U.S.
- Died: April 8, 1957 (aged 53); Los Angeles, California, U.S.
- Resting place: Holy Cross Cemetery
- Occupation: Actress
- Years active: 1925–1948
- Spouses: Allen D Stafford (m. 1920; div. 1924) William Boyd (m. 1930; div. 1936) Harold Shapiro (m. 1947)

Dorothy Sebastian (born Stella Dorothy Sabiston; April 26, 1903 (Note: The book Celebrities in Los Angeles Cemeteries: A Directory gives Sebastian's date of birth as April 26, 1907.) – April 8, 1957) was an American film and stage actress.

== Early years ==
Sebastian was born and raised in Birmingham, Alabama, the daughter of Lycurgus (Lawrence) Robert and Stella Armstrong Sabiston. In her early years she aspired to be a missionary, since her grandparents were missionaries, but when she was taken to a theater during this time, she changed her mind and aspired to be an actress. She attended the University of Alabama but only for a short while and then married her high-school sweetheart, Allan Stafford, some time in 1920. She lived with him in Birmingham and helped operate the Staffords' laundry store. After her marriage ended in 1924, she left for New York sometime after.

After leaving Alabama and starting a career on the stage, she changed the spelling of her name to Sebastian. Upon her arrival in New York City, she had a southern drawl thick enough, in the words of one news report, to "cut with a knife". She spent her days visiting theatrical agents—and being consistently rejected—before returning at night to a $12-a-month room.

== Career ==
Her first break came when she secured a role in George White's Scandals as a chorus girl. She then met Max Aitken, otherwise known as Lord Beaverbrook. Through this connection, she scored a screen test with Henry King, which led to her first starring role, in the film Sackloth and Scarlet. This part landed her a five-year contract with MGM, where she co-starred with Joan Crawford and Anita Page in a popular series of MGM romantic dramas, including Our Dancing Daughters (1928) and Our Blushing Brides (1930). Sebastian appeared in 1929's Spite Marriage, cast opposite the then-married Buster Keaton, with whom she began an affair.

MGM released Sebastian in 1930; her last film for the studio was a short subject starring the young Jack Benny. Harry Cohn of then-low-budget Columbia Pictures seized on Sebastian's availability by signing her to a Columbia contract; Cohn welcomed any former MGM players for their name value. After Columbia released Sebastian a year later, she began freelancing, mostly at low-budget independent studios. Her most familiar appearance in sound films is probably in Allez Oop (1934), a short comedy produced by Educational Pictures that reunited her with Buster Keaton.

In 1930 Sebastian married outdoor-adventure star William Boyd (the future Hopalong Cassidy). After their 1936 divorce, she returned to acting, appearing in mostly bit parts. Her last onscreen appearance was in the 1948 film The Miracle of the Bells.

=== Songwriting ===
Sebastian co-wrote the ballad "The Leaves Mustn't Fall" with Jack Kenney.

== Personal life ==
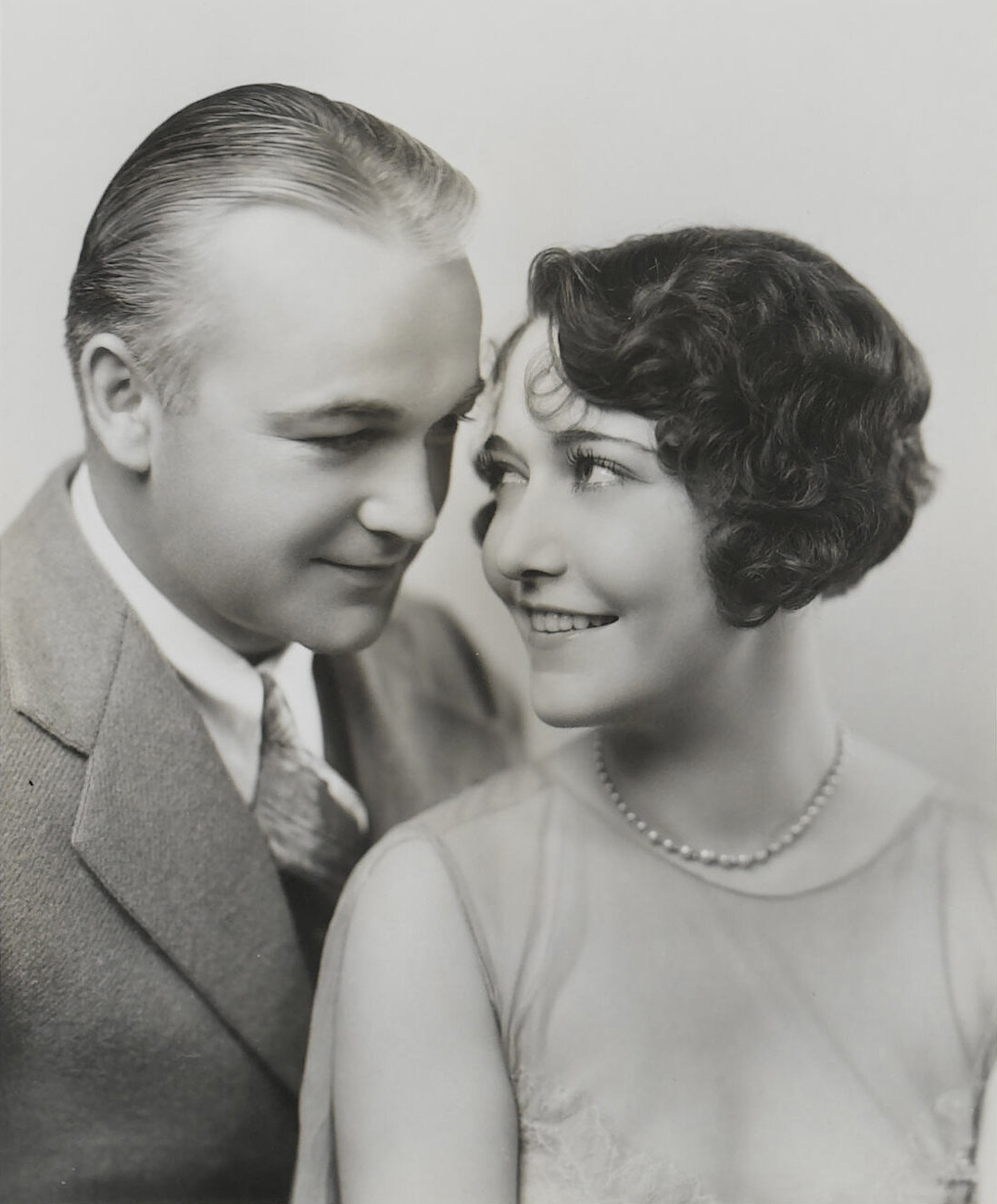
Sebastian and William Boyd in His First Command (1929)

While still in Birmingham, Sebastian married her high-school sweetheart, Allen Stafford, on November 9, 1920. The marriage ended four years later just before she moved to New York.

Sebastian married actor William Boyd in December 1930 in Las Vegas, Nevada. They began a relationship after meeting on the set of His First Command in 1929. They divorced in 1936.

=== Legal issues ===
On November 7, 1938, Sebastian was found guilty of drunk driving in a Beverly Hills, California Justice Court. The night she was arrested, she had been dining at Buster Keaton's home with her nephew. She was given a 30-day suspended jail sentence and paid a fine of $75.

In 1940, Sebastian was denied an award of $10,000 from a San Diego court. She had appeared at a Red Cross benefit in San Francisco in 1937 and failed to pay her hotel bill. She contended the promoter for the event should have paid the bill. An employee of the Plaza Hotel took out the suit, charging "defrauding an innkeeper." The State Supreme Court of California reversed the lower court's decision, which had awarded her the money on grounds of malicious prosecution.

== Death and legacy ==
On April 8, 1957, Sebastian died of cancer at the Motion Picture & Television Country House and Hospital in Woodland Hills, California, a few weeks before her 54th birthday. She is buried at Holy Cross Cemetery, Culver City, California.

For her contribution to the motion picture industry, Sebastian has a star on the Hollywood Walk of Fame at 6655 Hollywood Boulevard. It was dedicated on February 8, 1960.

== Filmography ==
Year	Title	Role	Notes
1925	Bluebeard's Seven Wives	Gilda La Bray	Lost film
1925	Sackcloth and Scarlet	Polly Freeman	Lost film
1925	Why Women Love	Pearl	Lost film
1925	Winds of Chance	Laura	
1926	Torrent	Woman in Audience	Uncredited
1926	You'd Be Surprised	Ruth Whitman	
1927	The Show	Salvation Army Worker	Uncredited
1927	The Demi-Bride	Lola	Lost film
1927	On Ze Boulevard	Gaby de Sylva	
1927	The Isle of Forgotten Women	Marua	Incomplete film
1927	Slide, Kelly, Slide	Train Passenger	Uncredited
1927	California	Carlotta del Rey	Lost film
1927	Twelve Miles Out	Chiquita	
1927	Tea for Three	Annette	Lost film
1927	The Arizona Wildcat	Regina Schyler	Lost film
1927	Love	Spectator Extra at Races	Uncredited
1927	The Haunted Ship	Goldie Kane	Lost film
1928	Our Dancing Daughters	Beatrice	
1928	Show People	Dorothy Sebastian	Uncredited
1928	A Woman of Affairs	Constance	
1928	Their Hour	Cora	Lost film
1928	The House of Scandal	Ann Rourke	Lost film
1928	Wyoming	Samantha Jerusha Farrell	Lost film
1928	The Adventurer	Dolores de Silva	Lost film
1929	Spite Marriage	Trilby Drew	
1929	His First Command	Judy Gaylord	
1929	Morgan's Last Raid	Judith Rogers	Lost film
1929	The Devil's Apple Tree	Dorothy Ryan	Lost film
1929	The Rainbow	Lola	
1929	The Spirit of Youth	Betty Grant	
1929	The Single Standard	Mercedes	
1929	The Unholy Night	Lady Efra Cavender	Alternative title: The Green Ghost
1930	Brothers	Norma Moore	
1930	Montana Moon	Elizabeth "Lizzie" Prescott	
1930	Officer O'Brien	Ruth Dale	
1930	Free and Easy	Dorothy Sebastian - Actress in Cave Scene	
1930	Hell's Island	Marie	
1930	Our Blushing Brides	Francine Daniels	
1930	The Rounder	Ethel Dalton	MGM short, costarring Jack Benny.
1930	Ladies Must Play	Norma Blake	
1930	The Utah Kid	Jennie Lee	
1931	The Big Gamble	Beverly	
1931	The Deceiver	Ina Fontanne	
1931	The Lightning Flyer	Rose Rogers	
1931	Ships of Hate	Grace Walsh	
1932	They Never Come Back	Adele Landon	
1933	Ship of Wanted Men	Irene Reynolds	
1934	The Life of Vergie Winters	Lulu	
1937	The Mysterious Pilot	Jean McNain	
1939	The Arizona Kid	Bess Warren	
1939	Days of Jesse James	Zerilda James	
1939	Rough Riders' Round-up	Rose	
1939	The Women	Saleswoman Pat	
1941	Among the Living	Woman in Cafe	
1941	Kansas Cyclone	Helen King	
1942	True to the Army	Gloria	Uncredited
1942	Reap the Wild Wind	Guest at Ball	Uncredited
1945	George White's Scandals	Gloria	Uncredited
1948	The Miracle of the Bells	Miss Katie Orwin	Uncredited
