= The Love Piker =

1923 film

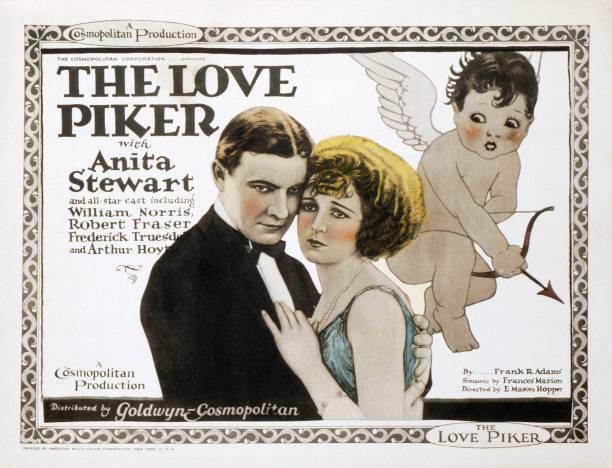
- Directed by: E. Mason Hopper
- Written by: Frank R. Adams; Frances Marion
- Starring: Anita Stewart; William Norris; Robert Frazer; Betty Francisco
- Cinematography: George Barnes
- Production company: Cosmopolitan Productions
- Distributed by: Goldwyn-Cosmopolitan Distributing Corporation
- Release date: July 22, 1923
- Running time: 70 minutes
- Country: United States
- Languages: Silent; English intertitles

The Love Piker is a 1923 American silent romantic drama film directed by E. Mason Hopper and starring Anita Stewart, Robert Frazer and Betty Francisco.

== Synopsis ==
A wealthy society woman falls in love with an engineer, but as their wedding approaches she is self-conscious about his old-fashioned poverty-stricken father and fails to invite him to the ceremony.

== Cast ==
- Anita Stewart as Hope Warner
- William Norris as Peter Van Huisen
- Robert Frazer as Martin Van Huisen
- Carl Gerard as Archie Pembroke
- Arthur Hoyt as Professor Click
- Betty Francisco as Edith Cloney
- Winston Miller as Willie Warner
- Mayme Kelso as Mrs. Warner
- Frederick Truesdell as Mr. Warner
- Robert Bolder as Butler
- Cordelia Callahan as Maid
- James F. Fulton as Judge

== Bibliography ==
- Connelly, Robert B. The Silents: Silent Feature Films, 1910-36, Volume 40, Issue 2. December Press, 1998.
- Munden, Kenneth White. The American Film Institute Catalog of Motion Pictures Produced in the United States, Part 1. University of California Press, 1997.
