= Don't Call Me Little Girl =

1921 film

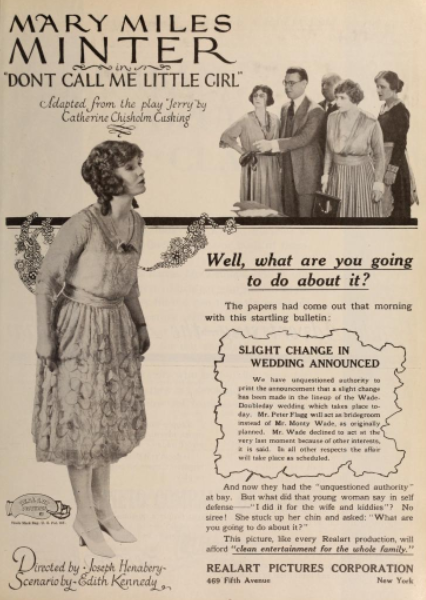
- Advertisement
- Directed by: Joseph Henabery
- Screenplay by: Edith Kennedy
- Based on: Jerry by Catherine Chisholm Cushing
- Starring: Mary Miles Minter; Ruth Stonehouse; Jerome Patrick
- Cinematography: Faxon M. Dean
- Production company: Realart Pictures Corporation
- Distributed by: Realart Pictures Corporation
- Release date: June 1921
- Running time: 5 reels
- Country: United States
- Language: Silent (English intertitles)

Don't Call Me Little Girl is a 1921 American silent comedy film directed by Joseph Henabery and starring Mary Miles Minter. It was adapted by Edith Kennedy from the stage play "Jerry" by Catherine Chisholm Cushing. As with many of Minter's features, it is thought to be a lost film.

== Plot ==
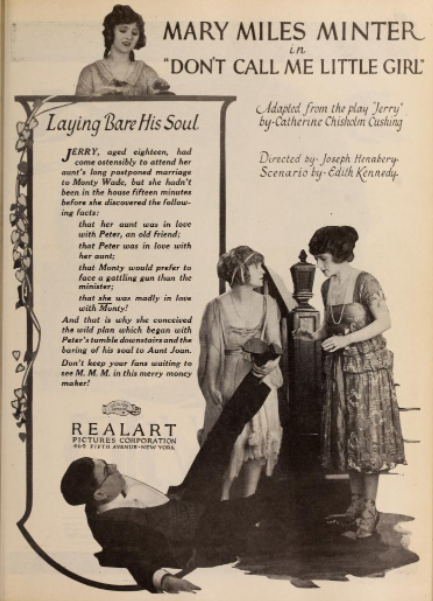
Advertisement from "Motion Picture News"

As described in various film magazine reviews, Jerry Doubleday is an eighteen-year-old girl, who arrives with her mother to stay with her aunt Joan ahead of her wedding. Aunt Joan's engagement to Monty Wade has gone on for ten years but the wedding seems on course to finally take place - until Jerry has other ideas.

Determined to prove to her mother that she is no longer a little girl, Jerry arrives at the station dressed in the most modern fashions, and immediately "borrows" an automobile to take for a spin. This automobile turns out to belong to Monty, who rescues Jerry when she crashes it into a fruit stand and promptly falls for her.

Jerry is determined to have Monty for herself, and thus she schemes to make some adjustments to Aunt Joan's upcoming wedding. She realises that an old acquaintance of Joan's, Peter Flagg, still has feelings for her, and Jerry causes Peter to have a minor accident that requires him to stay at Joan's house. She then places a notice in the local paper, stating that Joan's upcoming wedding will still take place, but with Peter as the groom instead of Monty.

All are horrified when they read the changed announcement, but Jerry is unrepentant. Eventually, however, Joan is persuaded that Peter is the right man for her. Jerry has to resort to a feigned suicide for Monty to admit his feelings for her, but in the end all is resolved so that a double Doubleday wedding can take place.

== Cast ==
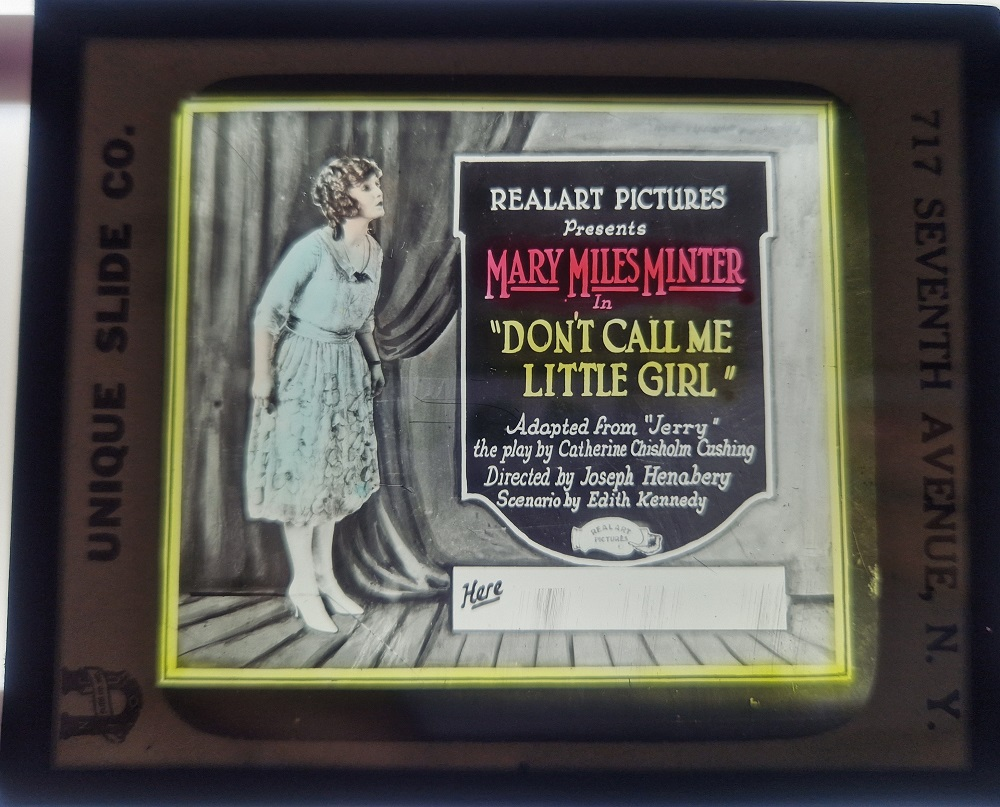
Lantern Slide for "Don't Call Me Little Girl"

- Mary Miles Minter as Jerry
- Winifred Greenwood as Harriet Doubleday
- Ruth Stonehouse as Joan Doubleday
- Jerome Patrick as Monty Wade
- Edward Flanagan as Peter Flagg
- Fanny Midgley as Mrs. Doubleday
