= Spite Marriage =

1929 film by Buster Keaton and Edward Sedgwick

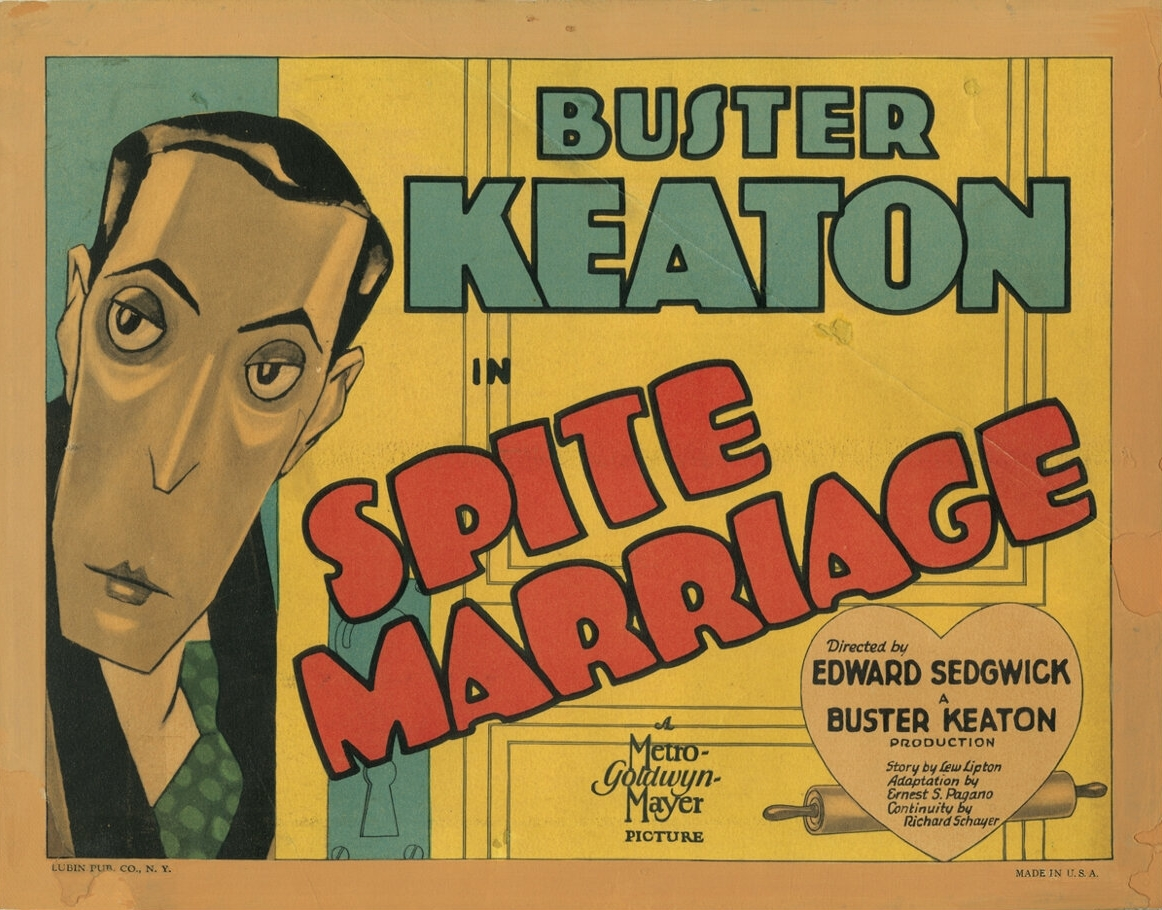
- Lobby card
- Directed by: Edward Sedgwick; Buster Keaton
- Written by: Robert Hopkins (titles)
- Story by: Lew Lipton; Ernest Pagano (adaptation)
- Produced by: Joseph M. Schenck Productions
- Starring: Buster Keaton; Dorothy Sebastian
- Cinematography: Reggie Lanning
- Edited by: Frank Sullivan
- Distributed by: Metro-Goldwyn-Mayer
- Release date: March 25, 1929; (premiere in New York City)
- Running time: 76 minutes (8 reels)
- Country: United States
- Language: Silent (English intertitles)

Full film

Spite Marriage is a 1929 American silent comedy film co-directed by Buster Keaton and Edward Sedgwick and starring Keaton and Dorothy Sebastian. It is the second film Keaton made for MGM and his last silent film, although he had wanted it to be a "talkie" or full sound film. While the production has no recorded dialogue, it does feature an accompanying synchronized score and recorded laughter, applause, and other sound effects. Keaton later wrote gags for some up-and-coming MGM stars like Red Skelton, and recycled many gags from Spite Marriage, some shot-for-shot, for Skelton's 1943 film I Dood It.

== Plot ==
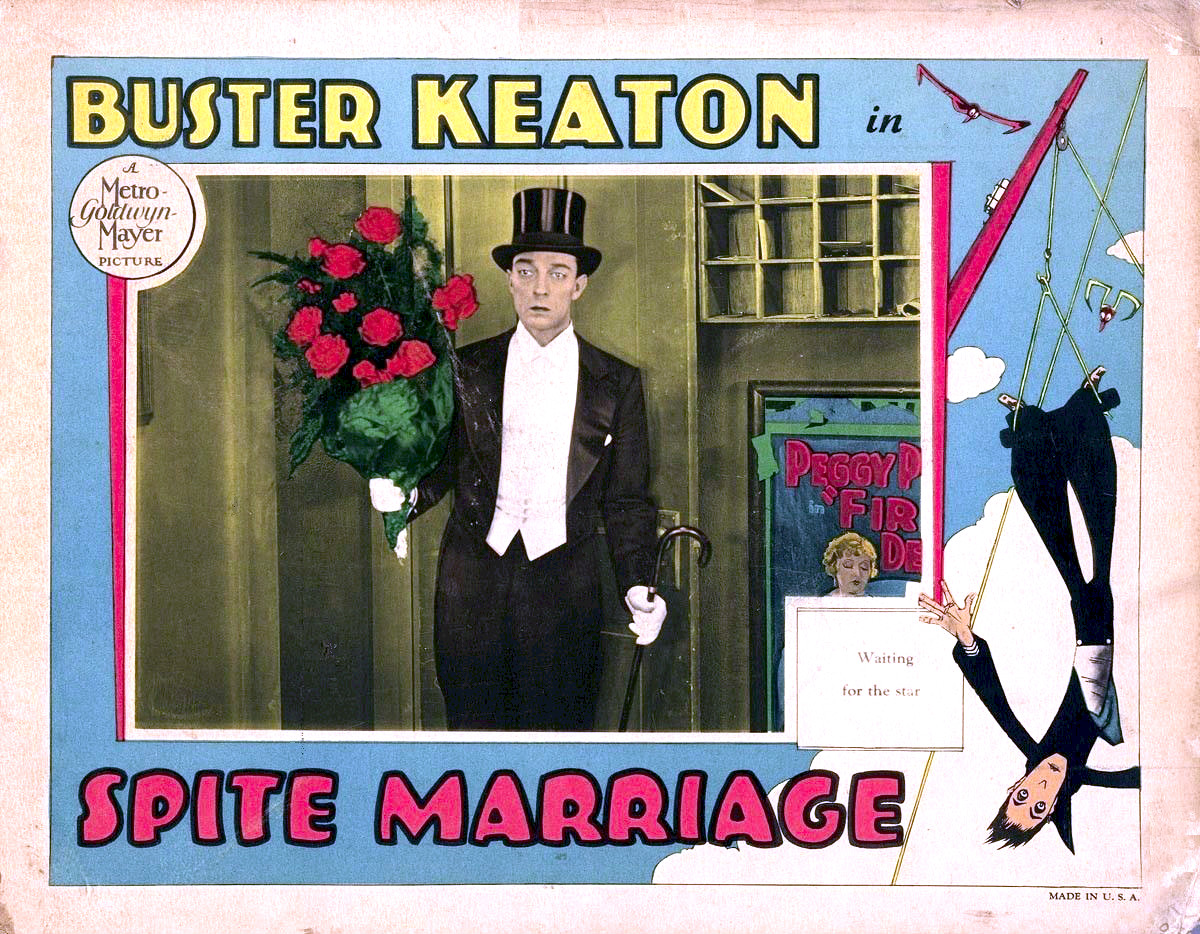
Lobby card

Elmer, always seen at the theater in imposing formal dress, is really a humble worker in a dry cleaning establishment. (Elmer's full name isn't mentioned in the narrative, but a newspaper story near the end identifies him as "Elmer Gantry.") He idolizes stage actress Trilby Drew and goes to see her performances all the time, pretending to be a wealthy admirer.

Trilby is in love with fellow actor Lionel Benmore. When Lionel temporarily spurns her for the younger Ethyl Norcrosse, she impulsively asks Elmer to marry her. Her manager, worried about the damage it would do to her career if it got out that she had married a pants presser, tells Elmer the next day that she wants out of the marriage.

Elmer gets into an altercation with Benmore, eventually punching him. Benmore gets the police to chase him. During the pursuit, Elmer gets into a taxi with a gunman. After the driver flees, the crook forces Elmer to drive the taxi into the ocean. He is rescued by a passing ship.

Wanting to have nothing more to do with Trilby, Elmer gets a job on the ship. However, it turns out that she and Benmore are passengers. When the engine room catches fire, the order is given to abandon ship. Trilby is knocked unconscious when Benmore panics, and is left behind. Elmer manages to put out the fire, leaving him and Trilby alone aboard. The ship is then taken over by crooks. When Trilby is discovered by their lecherous leader Scarzi, Elmer has to take on the entire gang to save her. He returns to port in triumph. He sees Trilby home and starts to leave, but she stops him, having seen his true worth.

== Cast ==
- Buster Keaton as Elmer
- Dorothy Sebastian as Trilby Drew
- Edward Earle as Lionel Benmore
- Leila Hyams as Ethyl Norcrosse
- William Bechtel as Frederick Nussbaum
- John Byron as Giovanni Scarzi
- Joe Bordeaux as Rumrunner (uncredited)
- Ray Cooke as The Bellboy (uncredited)
- Mike Donlin as Man in Ship's Engine Room (uncredited)
- Pat Harmon as Tugboat Captain (uncredited)
- Sydney Jarvis as Man in Audience Next to Elmer (uncredited)
- Theodore Lorch as Actor as Union Officer (uncredited)
- Hank Mann as Stage Manager (uncredited)
- Charles Sullivan as Tough Sailor (uncredited)

== Pre-production ==
In its September 12, 1928 issue, the widely read entertainment paper Variety announced: "Buster Keaton's next, Spite Marriage, will also have dialog," while Exhibitors Daily Review also reported the same day that "Buster Keaton will do his initial speaking in Spite Marriage." Despite those announcements by popular, well-connected trade publications, the film was destined from pre-production to be a silent offering from MGM, at least one without any recorded dialogue.

The studio's head of production, Irving Thalberg, opposed Keaton's plans to make the film his first "talkie." Thalberg had both financial and technical reasons for rejecting any proposals by Keaton or others to apply full sound to the planned comedy. First, in the fall of 1928, during that transition period into sound, MGM had at its disposal only one set of recording equipment. Second, Thalberg believed that adding the complications and expense of such a new technology to Keaton's film would significantly increase overall production costs, especially for a performer like Buster whose methods usually involved "time-consuming improvisations" and a high degree of flexibility while shooting. Third, and perhaps most significantly, the finished film would be more valuable to the studio in silent form: it could be shown to advantage in the many theaters, in America and abroad, that had not yet converted to sound. Thus, Thalberg's preference for technical simplicity reduced delays and increased potential profits from the final product.

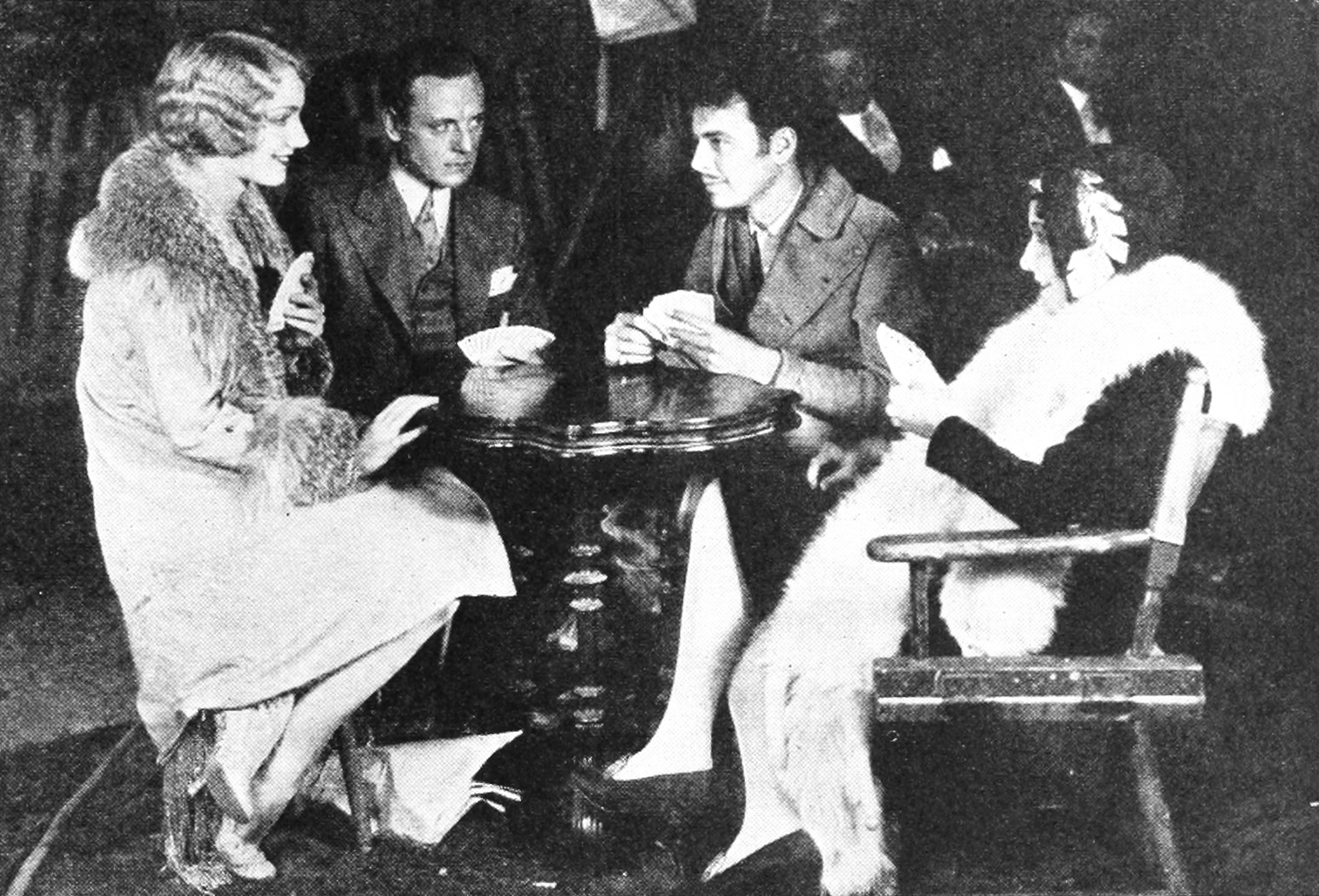
Actors playing cards during break in filming Spite Marriage, December 1928, (left to right) Hyams, Earle, set visitor William "Buster" Collier, and Sebastian.

== Production and reception ==
According to the American Film Institute's catalog, production work on the film started on November 14, 1928, a date generally consistent with a November 27 report in Exhibitors Herald and Motion Picture World, which announces that Keaton began work on the film "last week."

News updates about the film in 1928 trade publications indicate that casting was still being finalized in the latter half of November. Exhibitors Daily Review announced on November 16: "Dorothy Sebastian has been given the feminine lead opposite Buster Keaton," and on November 23, "Edward Earle is playing the heavy in Buster Keaton's picture, Spite Marriage." A week later, The Distributor, a paper published by MGM's sales department, confirmed that the studio had assigned Leila Hyams a "big part" in "the forthcoming Buster Keaton vehicle" in part due to her "distinct success" as a lead in the studio's recent crime drama Alias Jimmy Valentine, which had been released just two weeks earlier. The studio publication in the same news item also confirmed that Sydney Jarvis and Hank Mann had joined the cast, although their roles would be uncredited on the screen.

Spite Marriage was released in April 1929, in two editions: a mute print for silent-only theaters, and a "synchronized" version for sound theaters, with the action accompanied by an orchestra score and sound effects. The feature was generally very well received by critics in leading newspapers, by reviewers in the film industry's major trade journals and papers, as well as by moviegoers. The influential critic for The New York Times, Mordaunt Hall, commented about the audience's response to the comedy in his assessment of the film. He noted that Keaton created "a state of high glee" in the Capitol Theatre in Manhattan, where Hall attended the comedy's premiere on March 25, adding that "there were waves of laughter from top to bottom of the house."Abel Green, the editor and reviewer for Variety, characterized Keaton's production as "replete with belly laffs" and also described the Capitol's audience being in "hysterics" and "mirthful" while watching it. While Green did express some reservations about what he viewed as several of the film's implausible situations and its "mechanized" structure, he predicted nothing but financial success for the "enjoyable low comedy glorified slapsticker."

The trade paper The Film Daily rated the MGM feature as "the funniest film released in months." In its March 31 review, the paper praised the film and drew special attention to Sebastian's performance:

Buster Keaton puts over one of the best he has ever done and has 'em fairly rocking in their seats. Dorothy Sebastian springs a big surprise as a comedienne who can only be compared to Marion Davies ...[The film] is a natural for real laughs that keep coming with practically no let-up right through the footage. There are three outstanding comedy sequences, all hitting the funny bone from a new angle. In one gag that Buster pulls, it is so original and screamingly funny that the audience at the Capitol broke out in spontaneous applause.

After seeing a preview of Spite Marriage weeks before its premiere in New York, reviewer Walter R. Greene of the trade journal Motion Picture News, praised the feature even more than The Film Daily, judging Keaton's work to be not only his best film "since he graduated from the two reel ranks" but also "one of the best pieces of comedy business ever developed in a picture." Comparing Spite Marriage to Charlie Chaplin's The Gold Rush (1925), Greene, in his review, stated: "The picture is packed with laughs" and reports that the sequence in which Keaton puts his intoxicated wife to bed evoked from the audience "a continual roar for over half a reel."Photoplay, the nation's leading movie-fan magazine of the period, only added to the accolades and endorsements that the film received in 1929. In its April issue, the magazine labelled the film "hilarious," "intense," and "Chaplinesque." Then, in May, Photoplay provided another, more succinct review to its large readership: "One of the best Buster Keaton has made, with Dorothy Sebastian excellent. Don't miss."

Keaton subsequently appeared in MGM's all-talking variety show The Hollywood Revue of 1929 but his performance was entirely in pantomime. Audiences attending M-G-M's theaters had to wait until the spring of 1930 to hear Keaton's voice, in the musical comedy Free and Easy.

== See also ==
- Buster Keaton filmography
