= Nola Luxford =

New Zealand film actress

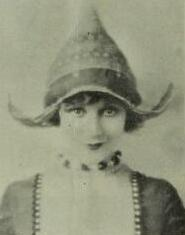
- Luxford in 1922
- Born: Adelaide Minola Pratt; 23 December 1895; Hunterville, New Zealand
- Died: 10 October 1994 (aged 98); Pasadena, California, U.S.
- Occupation: Film actress

Nola Luxford OBE QSM (born Adelaide Minola Pratt; 23 December 1895 – 10 October 1994) was a New Zealand-born American film actress, spanning from the silent film era to the 1930s. During the 1932 Summer Olympics in Los Angeles, she was also a writer and pioneer broadcaster, providing a daily radio programme for audiences in Australia and New Zealand.

== Early life ==
Luxford was born as Adelaide Minola Pratt in Hunterville, New Zealand, on 23 December 1895, and raised in Hastings. She was the eldest of three children of Adelaide Agnes McGonagle, a schoolteacher, and Ernest Augustus Pratt, a draper, who also operated and owned a bookstore, Luxford was interested in performance from a young age, learning the piano and taking part in repertory productions. After leaving school, Luxford worked as a ledger keeper for the Union Bank of Australia.

In April 1919, Luxford's father eloped with an assistant from the family's bookstore, causing the family to receive significant public scrutiny. After marrying returned serviceman Maurice George "Maurie" Luxford in 1919, Luxford travelled to the United States with her husband, searching for better economic prospects after learning that Maurice was penniless.

== Career ==
Luxford's first Hollywood film appearance was in the 1920 film The Tiger's Coat. From 1920 through 1927 she would appear in thirteen films, starring opposite and alongside such actors as Bill Cody, Jack Holt, and Carmel Myers, becoming one of the only New Zealand-born Hollywood actresses from during the 1920s. In 1932, she gave a daily one-hour radio report on the Olympics at Los Angeles for New Zealand and Australia, relayed "down under" by short-wave radio. She made six film appearances between 1932 and 1935, with the only credited ones of any notability being The Iron Master (starring Reginald Denny) and Lost in Limehouse (starring Laura La Plante), both in 1933. She retired from film after 1935, and settled in Pasadena, California.

Luxford was hired by NBC as one of the first female network news announcers, which included the announcement on 3 September 1939 of Britain's declaration of war on Germany during World War II. Through her wartime radio broadcasts she became known as the "Angel of the Anzacs". After being sought out by two Royal New Zealand Air Force sergeants who were unfamiliar with New York and needed assistance, Luxford was inspired to established the Anzac Club of New York, an organisation that supported Australian and New Zealand service personnel visiting the city. By the end of World War II, approximately 35,000 Australian and New Zealand service personnel had passed through the New York Anzac Club. In 1940, Luxford proposed the establishment of the ANZAC memorial garden, located on the roof of the British Empire Building, with support from the Rockefeller family.

Following World War II, Luxford published a children's book, Kerry Kangaroo, lectured across the United States, and became a refugee advocate and conservationist.

== Recognition ==
In recognition of Luxford's efforts during the war, she was awarded the Order of the British Empire, as well as the American Award of Merit and the Queen's Service Medal.

== Personal life ==
Her first husband, Maurice George "Maurie" Luxford, whom she wed in 1919, died. Luxford divorced Maurice in April 1927, and two months later married William Bauernschmidt, the son of a wealthy family from Baltimore. She became a naturalised United States citizen on 12 November 1928. Luxford began the process of divorcing Bauernschmidt in the 1930s, leading to significant press coverage, often painting her as materialistic. The divorce was finalised in 1939. On 1 August 1959, Luxford married her third husband, Glenn Russell Dolberg, who had originally been the NBC manager who hired her to cover the 1932 Olympic Games. The couple lived in the Los Angeles hills, until Dolberg's death in 1977. She continued to live in Pasadena, California, where she died on 10 October 1994, aged 98. She was survived by five nieces and one nephew.

Through her life, Luxford decided to reverse her forename and middle name, and listed herself as being born in 1901, and on documents listed her birth date as 24 December, coinciding with her father's birthday.

== Partial filmography ==
- The Tiger's Coat (1920) as Clare Bagsby
- The Mad Marriage (1921) as Bob
- Opened Shutters (1921) as Edna Derwent
- The Flying Dutchman (1923) as Melissa
- Rouged Lips (1923) as Mamie Dugan
- The House of Youth (1924) as Society Girl
- Girl Shy (1924) as wife of Ronald DeVore, The Rich Man (uncredited)
- The Prince of Pep (1925) as Marion Ward
- Border Justice (1925) as Mary Maitland
- That Devil Quemado (1925) as Conchita Rameriz
- Forlorn River (1926) as Magda Lee
- The Meddlin' Stranger (1927) as Mildred Crawford
- Ladies Beware (1927) as Jeannie
- King of the Herd (1927) as Nancy Dorance
- Lost in Limehouse (Short) (1933) as Diana
- The Iron Master (1933) as Diana
- Kind Lady (1935) as Rose
