= The Other Woman (1921 film) =

1921 silent film

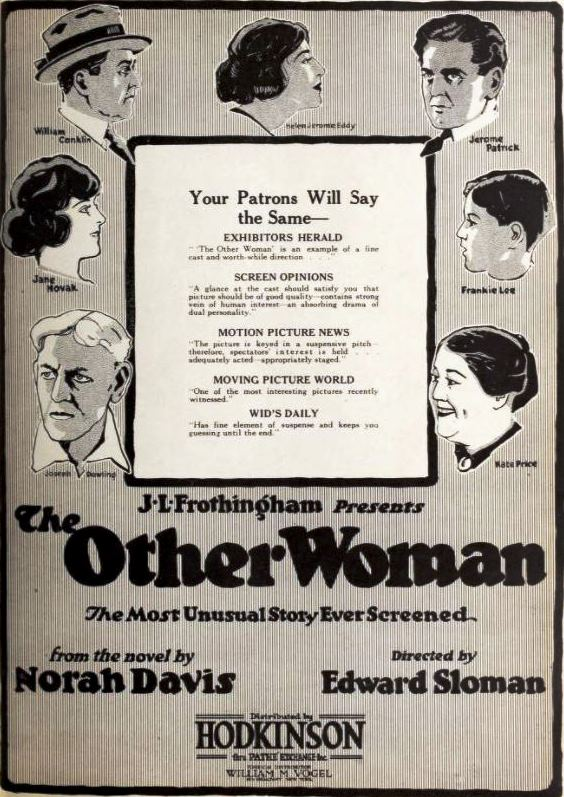
- Directed by: Edward Sloman
- Based on: The Other Woman by Norah Davis
- Produced by: J. L. Frothingham
- Starring: Jerome Patrick; Jane Novak; Helen Jerome Eddy
- Cinematography: Tony Gaudio
- Production company: J. L. Frothingham Productions
- Distributed by: Hodkinson Pictures
- Release date: April 1921
- Running time: 50 minutes
- Country: United States
- Languages: Silent; English intertitles

The Other Woman is a 1921 American silent drama film directed by Edward Sloman and starring Jerome Patrick, Jane Novak and Helen Jerome Eddy. According to The Encyclopedia of Martial Arts Films, this is the first film from the Western world to depict a martial arts fight, in this case using jujutsu.

== Plot ==
The title character is introduced as John Gorham, then becomes Langdon Kirven, returns to Gorham, and finally remains Kirven. Gorham/Kirven has a shock which has given him something like amnesia.

Spencer Ellis (the other main male character) is attacked by an unknown man, but a ragged stranger comes to his rescue. Ellis recognizes him as Kirven, his business partner missing five years and husband of Avery Kirven. But the man insists he is John Gorham.

Two years later, Gorham is an influential figure in the South, and engaged to Ellis' cousin, Naomi Joyce. While searching for the real Kirven, Ellis learns that Gorham is an escaped convict and forces Gorham to disappear. Then the real Kirven returns to his home and cannot explain where he has been for five years. Later, a second change overtakes him and he returns to Naomi as Gorham, and they are married. When a child is born, Gorham again becomes Kirven and returns to Avery, who has learned of his apparent "double life" and sends him back to Naomi.

== Cast ==
- Jerome Patrick as Langdon Kirven / John Gorham
- Jane Novak as Naomi Joyce
- Helen Jerome Eddy as Avery Kirven
- William Conklin as Spencer Ellis
- Joseph J. Dowling as Colonel Joyce
- Frankie Lee as Bobbie Kirven
- Lincoln Palmer as Charles Beattie
- Kate Price as Housekeeper

== Bibliography ==
- Munden, Kenneth White. The American Film Institute Catalog of Motion Pictures Produced in the United States, Part 1. University of California Press, 1997.
