= The Furnace (1920 film) =

1920 film

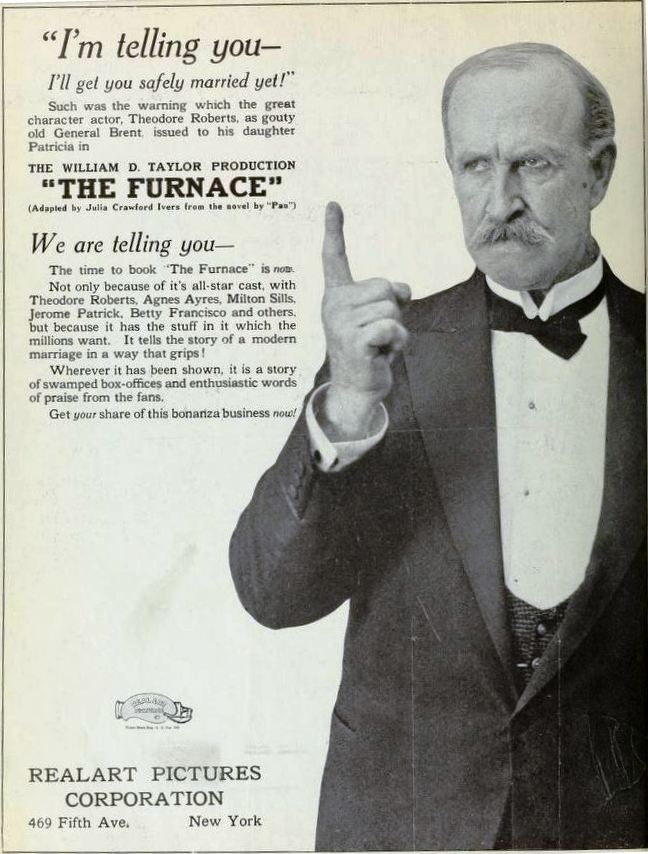
- Advertisement
- Directed by: William Desmond Taylor
- Written by: Julia Crawford Ivers
- Based on: The Furnace by Leslie Beresford (as Pan)
- Cinematography: James Van Trees
- Distributed by: Realart Pictures Corp.
- Release date: November 1920
- Country: United States
- Language: Silent (English intertitles)

The Furnace is a lost 1920 American silent drama film directed by William Desmond Taylor, written by Julia Crawford Ivers based upon the 1920 novel of the same name by Leslie Beresford. It was distributed by Realart Pictures.

== Cast ==
- Agnes Ayres as Folly Vallance
- Jerome Patrick as Anthony Bond
- Theodore Roberts as General Archibald Foulkes-Brent
- Betty Francisco as Patricia Brent
- Milton Sills as Keene Mordaunt
- Helen Dunbar as Lady Foulkes-Brent
- F. A. Turner as Albert Vallance (credited as Fred Turner)
- Mayme Kelso as Mrs. Vallance
- Lucien Littlefield as Bert Vallance
- Robert Bolder as Solomon Bassbridge
- Edward Martindel as Count Svenson
