= King of the Herd =

1927 film

- Directed by: Frank S. Mattison
- Written by: Frank S. Mattison
- Produced by: Frank S. Mattison
- Starring: Raymond McKee; Nola Luxford; Bud Osborne
- Cinematography: Jack Fuqua
- Production company: Frank S. Mattison Productions
- Distributed by: Aywon Film Corporation
- Release date: July 1, 1927
- Running time: 60 minutes
- Country: United States
- Languages: Silent; English intertitles

King of the Herd is a 1927 American silent Western film directed by Frank S. Mattison and starring Raymond McKee, Nola Luxford and Bud Osborne. Given an initial release in 1927, it went on a more general release in 1929.

== Cast ==
- White Star the Horse as White Star
- Raymond McKee as Paul Garrison
- Nola Luxford as Nancy Dorance
- Bud Osborne as Barry Kahn
- Laura Miskin
- Billy Franey
- Evelyn Francisco
- Fred Shanley
- Arthur Hotaling
- Eddie Harris
- Hugh Saxon
