= Ladies Beware =

1927 film

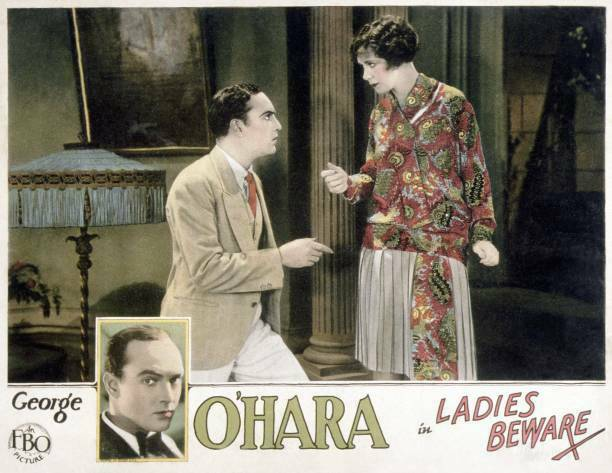
- Directed by: Charles Giblyn
- Written by: J.G. Hawks; Enid Hibbard
- Based on: Jack of Diamonds by Frederick J. Jackson
- Produced by: Joseph P. Kennedy
- Starring: George O'Hara; Nola Luxford; Kathleen Myers
- Cinematography: Jules Cronjager
- Production company: Robertson-Cole Pictures Corporation
- Distributed by: Film Booking Offices of America; Ideal Films (UK)
- Release date: June 26, 1927
- Running time: 50 minutes
- Country: United States
- Languages: Silent; English intertitles

Ladies Beware is a 1927 American silent crime film directed by Charles Giblyn and starring George O'Hara, Nola Luxford and Kathleen Myers.

== Synopsis ==
Jack, a jewel thief, is advised to leave town by the police. Before he does so he heads to the house party hosted by Georgette Ring, knowing that she has a very valuable ruby. His former associate Jeannie, now working as secretary to Mrs. Ring attempts to prevent him from taking it. In the event it is stolen by another of the guests Count Bodevsky.

== Cast ==
- George O'Hara as Jack O'Diamonds
- Nola Luxford as Jeannie
- Florence Wix as Mrs. Ring
- Kathleen Myers as Georgette
- Mario Carillo as Count Bodevsky
- Alan Brooks as Renwick Clarke
- Byron Douglas as Deputy Commissioner Croswell
- Bud Jamison as Tubbs
- Jimmy Aubrey as Handy

== Bibliography ==
- Connelly, Robert B. The Silents: Silent Feature Films, 1910-36, Volume 40, Issue 2. December Press, 1998.
- Munden, Kenneth White. The American Film Institute Catalog of Motion Pictures Produced in the United States, Part 1. University of California Press, 1997.
