= Double Dealing (1923 film) =

1923 film

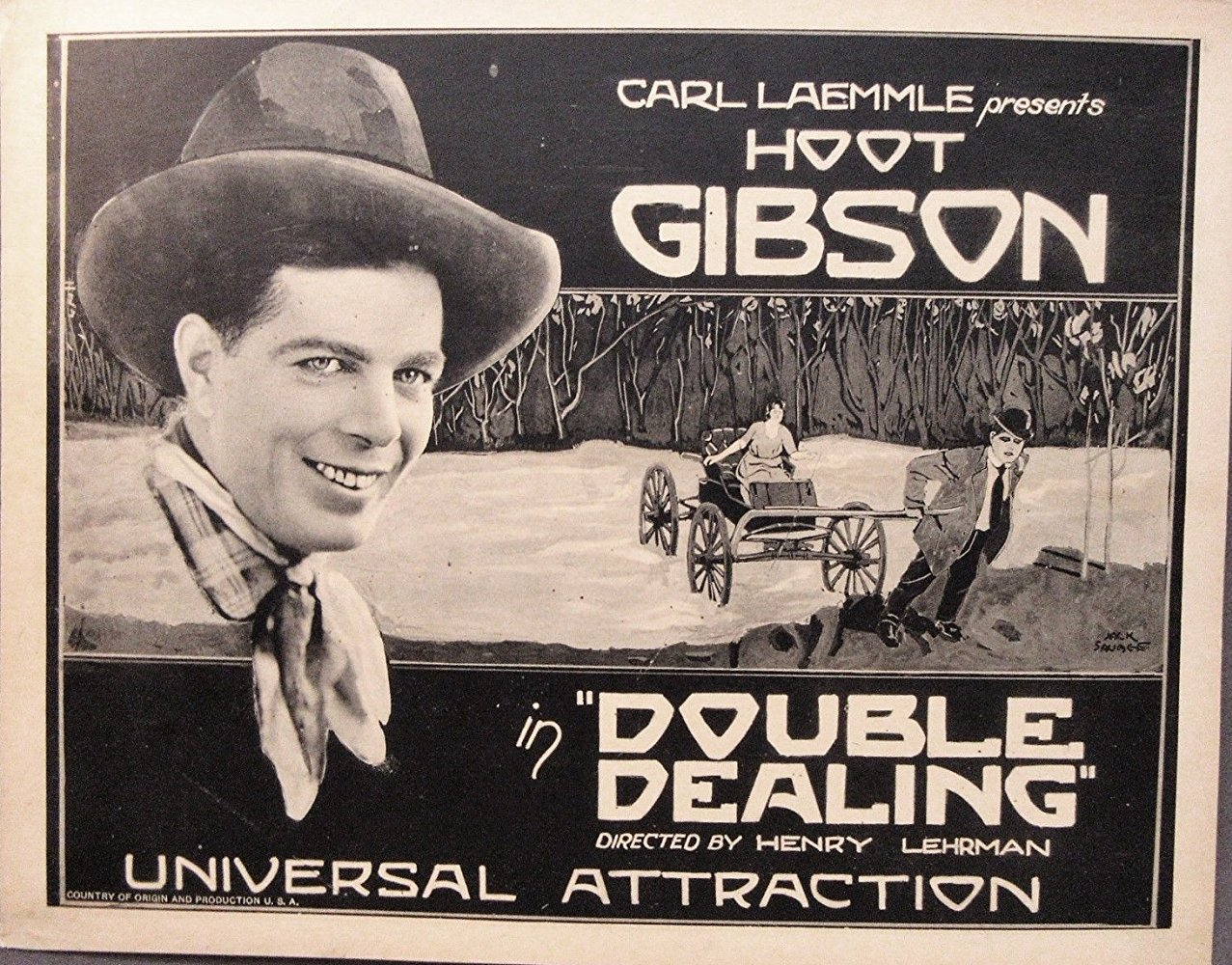
- Lobby card
- Directed by: Henry Lehrman
- Written by: George C. Hull; Henry Lehrman
- Starring: Hoot Gibson
- Cinematography: Dwight Warren
- Distributed by: Universal Pictures
- Release date: May 21, 1923
- Running time: 50 minutes
- Country: United States
- Language: Silent (English intertitles)

Double Dealing is a 1923 American comedy film directed by Henry Lehrman and featuring Hoot Gibson.

== Cast ==
- Hoot Gibson as Ben Slowbell
- Helen Ferguson as The Slavey
- Betty Francisco as Stella Fern
- Eddie Gribbon as Alonzo B. Keene
- Gertrude Claire as Mother Slowbell
- Otto Hoffman as Uriah Jobson
- Frank Hayes as The sheriff
- John Francis Dillon as Jobson's assistant

== See also ==
- List of American films of 1923
