= The Utah Kid (1930 film) =

1930 film

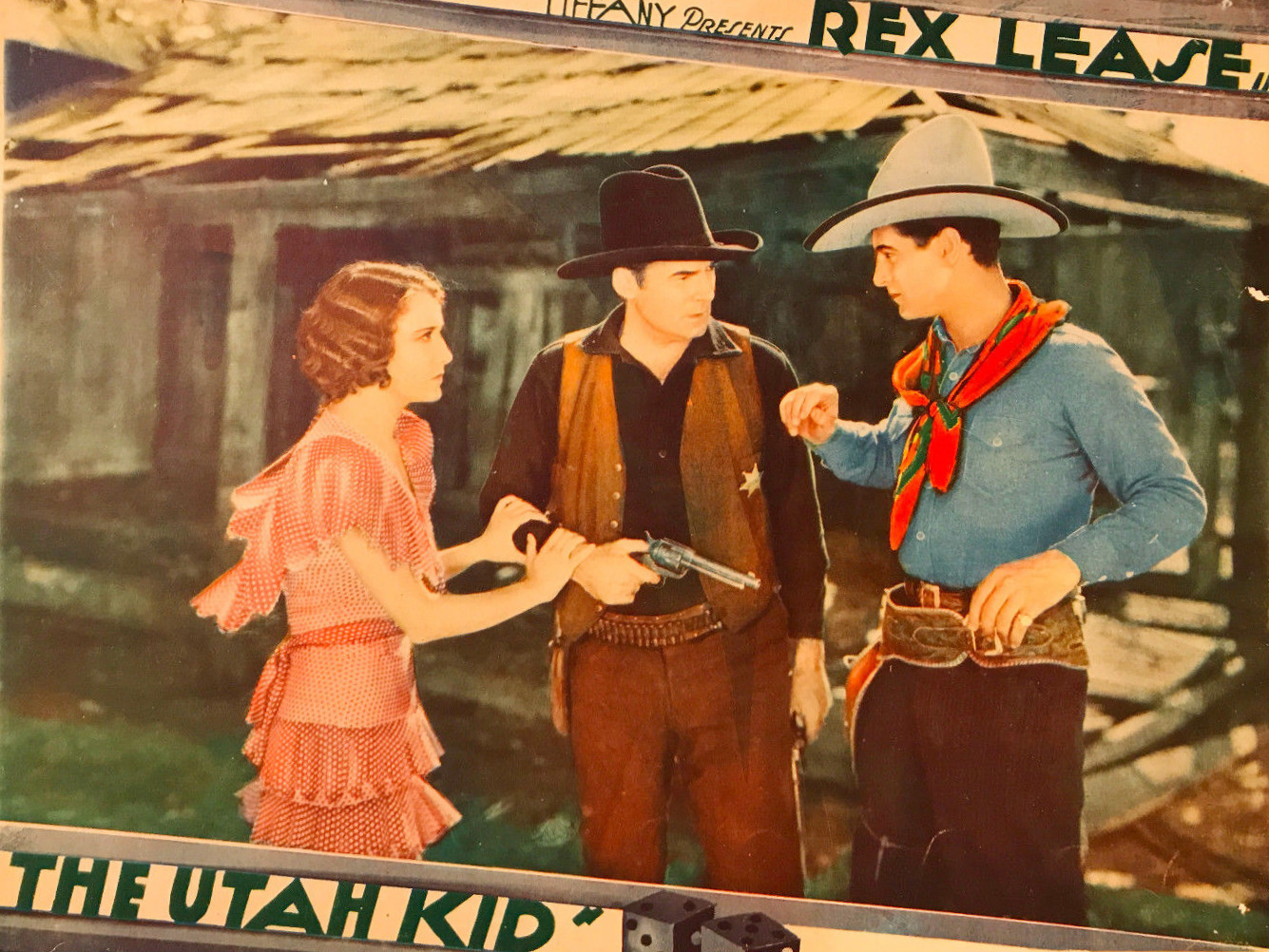
- Lobby card
- Directed by: Richard Thorpe
- Written by: Frank Howard Clark
- Starring: Rex Lease; Dorothy Sebastian
- Cinematography: Arthur Reed
- Edited by: Billy Bolen
- Distributed by: Tiffany Pictures
- Release date: November 7, 1930
- Running time: 57 minutes
- Country: United States
- Language: English

The Utah Kid is a 1930 American pre-Code Western film directed by Richard Thorpe and starring Rex Lease and Boris Karloff.

== Plot ==
A reformed outlaw marries a teacher to protect her from his gang.

== Cast ==
- Rex Lease as Cal Reynolds
- Dorothy Sebastian as Jennie Lee
- Tom Santschi as Butch
- Mary Carr as Aunt Ada
- Walter Miller as Sheriff Jim Bentley
- Lafe McKee as Parson Joe
- Boris Karloff as Henchman Baxter
- Bud Osborne as Deputy
- Chuck Baldra as Henchman (uncredited)
- Ralph Bucko as Henchman (uncredited)
- Bob Burns as Barfly (uncredited)
- Fred Burns as Rancher (uncredited)
- Bob Card as Henchman (uncredited)
- Bud McClure as Henchman (uncredited)
- Art Mix as Deputy (uncredited)
- Jack Rockwell as Henchman (uncredited)
- Hal Taliaferro as Deputy (uncredited)
- Al Taylor as Henchman (uncredited)
- Blackie Whiteford as Henchman (uncredited)
- Jay Wilsey as Deputy (uncredited)

== Production ==
In addition to Thorpe as director, Frank Howard Clark was the screenwriter, and Arthur Reed was the cinematographer.

== See also ==
- Boris Karloff filmography
