= Madame Behave =

1925 film by Scott Sidney

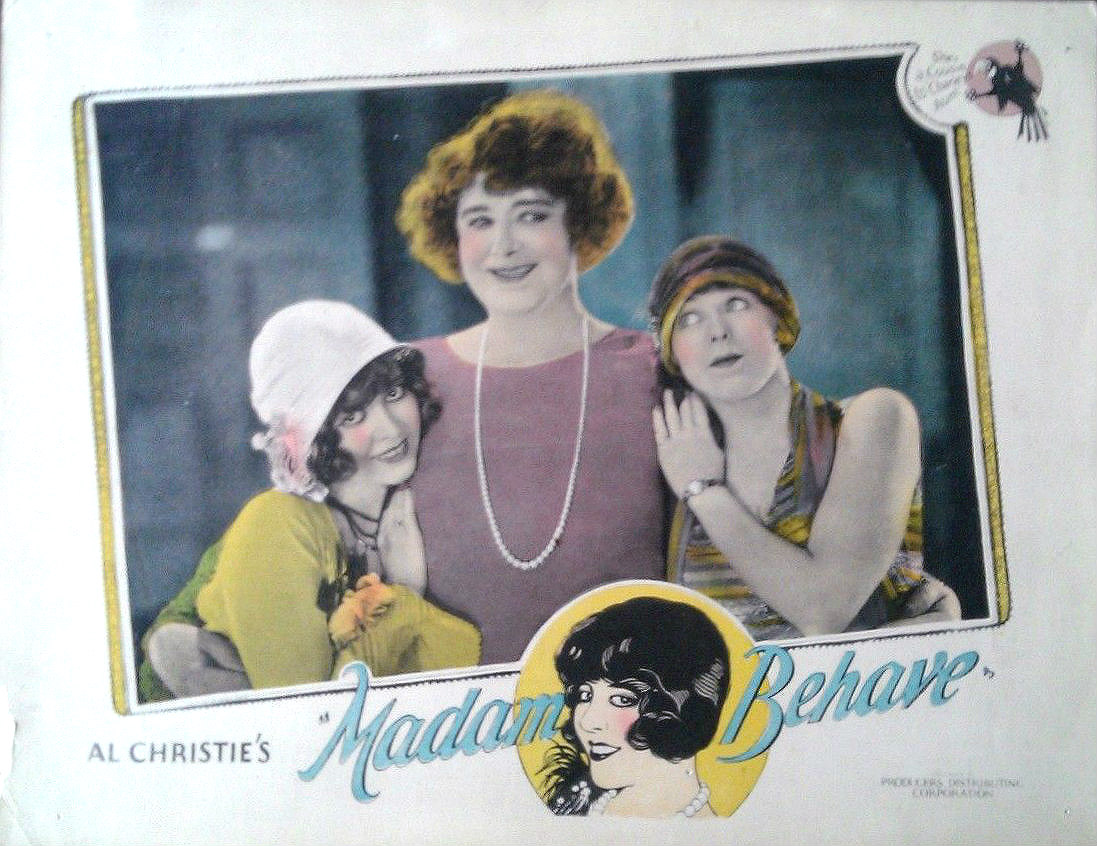
- Lobby card
- Directed by: Scott Sidney
- Written by: F. McGrew Willis (scenario)
- Based on: Madame Lucy by Jean Arlette
- Produced by: Al Christie
- Starring: Julian Eltinge; Ann Pennington
- Cinematography: Gus Peterson; Alec Phillips
- Distributed by: Producers Distributing Corporation (PDC)
- Release dates: November 21, 1925 (premiere); December 6, 1925 (nationwide)
- Running time: 6 reels (5,417 feet)
- Country: United States
- Language: Silent (English intertitles)

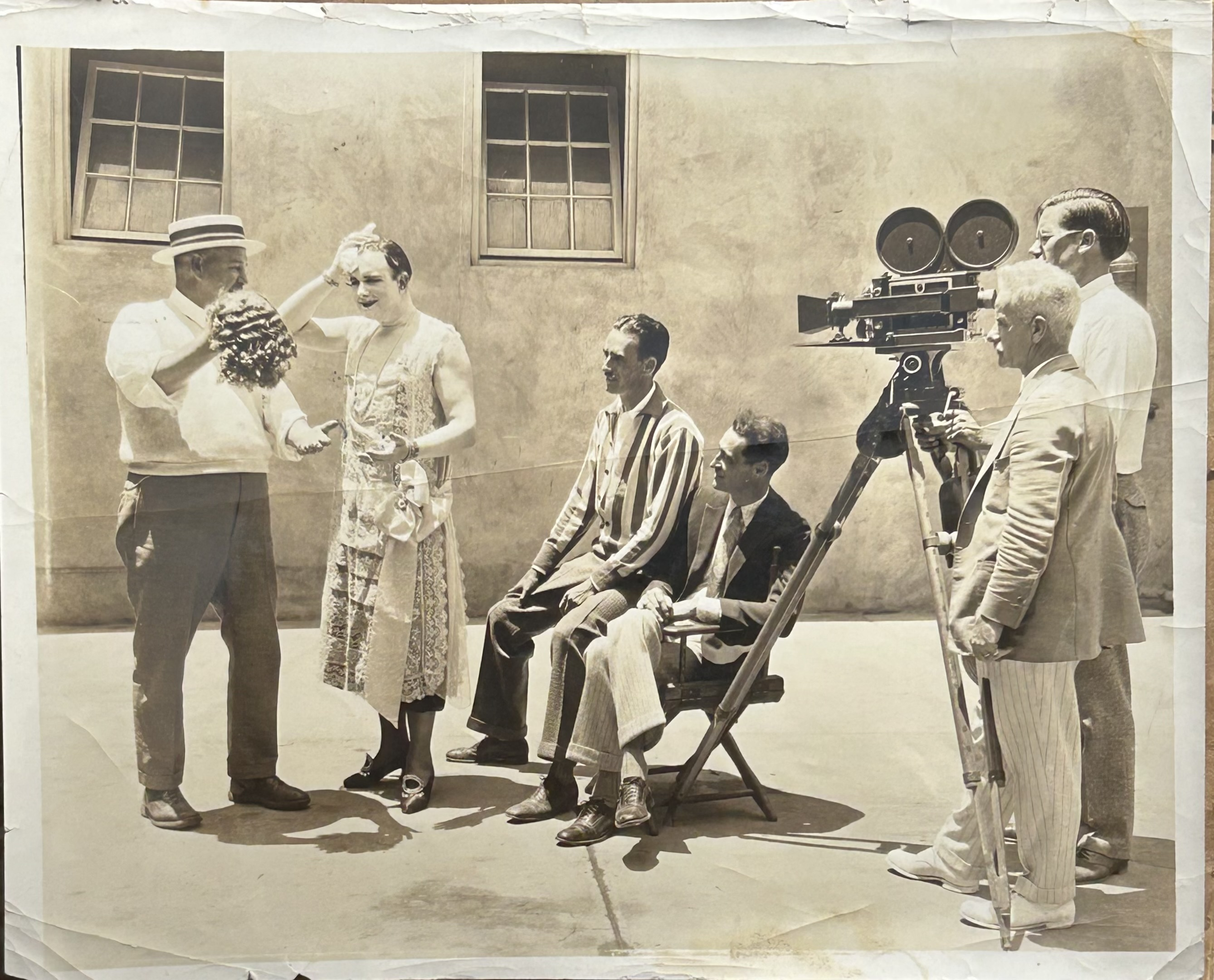
Production Photo with Eltinge and Willis

Madame Behave is a 1925 American silent comedy film directed by Scott Sidney starring cross-dressing actor Julian Eltinge. The film is an adaptation of the play Madame Lucy by Jean Arlette and was produced by Al Christie with distribution through Producers Distributing Corporation (or PDC).

== Plot ==
Jack Mitchell and Dick Corwin are two roommates who are late on their rent. If they cannot pay their landlord, Henry Jasper, he will kick them out of their apartment. Jack does not get paid for his architecture plans yet and Dick has already spent his inheritance. Jack and Dick leave to see Dick’s uncle, Seth Corwin, at the courthouse.

Henry is suing Seth for crashing his car into Henry’s vehicle. The main witness to the accident is an unknown woman. With the main witness missing, the judge overseeing the case postpones the trial for two weeks. Seth Corwin's lawyer advises him to find the woman who witnessed the accident and marry her. Jasper overhears this and decides that he will try to marry the woman first. If Henry Jasper marries her, he can make her testify against Corwin. If Seth Corwin marries her, she cannot testify against him. After the trial, Jack and Dick ask Seth for money to pay their rent before they get kicked out.

Jack takes the money Seth lends him for rent and uses it to buy an engagement ring for Gwen Townley. Gwen is under the care of Seth Corwin and she is engaged to another man named Percy Fairweather. She does not like Percy but is instead in love with Jack Mitchell. Jack tries to climb up to her balcony to give her the ring and Seth calls a policeman over to stop him. The policeman chases Jack to the apartments where Jack hides and pretends to be a woman. Dick introduces Jack as Madame Brown to Seth and Henry and tells them that Madame Brown is the one that witnessed the accident. Shenanigans ensue as Seth and Henry attempt to woo "Madame Brown" and race to marry her.

Later in the week, the policeman figures out Madame Brown's true identity. Before the policeman can arrest Jack, Gwen clears up the issue with him. The couple then runs off to get married. Seth and Henry return to the apartments shortly after and are informed that the judge has thrown out the case because the witness is still missing. Seth is also informed that Gwen and Jack have run off to get married. The film ends with a double wedding scene in a church with Jack, Ann, Dick, and Evelyn.

== Cast ==
- Julian Eltinge as Jack Mitchell / "Madame Behave"
- Ann Pennington as Gwen Townley
- Lionel Belmore as Seth Corwin
- David James as Dick Corwin
- Tom Wilson as Creosote
- Jack Duffy as Henry Jasper, the Landlord
- Stanhope Wheatcroft as Percy Fairweather
- Evelyn Francisco as Laura Barnes
- Tiny Sandford as Policeman

== Marketing ==
Madame Behave was marketed using the phrase "She's a Cousin to Charley's Aunt," a reference to a 1925 comedy film which also featured cross-dressing. This phrase appears in historical newspapers such as the Los Angeles Times and the Evening Telegraph. Julian Eltinge, known for his female impersonation act, was used to advertise the film. Ann Pennington's name was also used to advertise the film.

== Preservation ==
Madame Behave survives as an incomplete print at the Library of Congress.

== See also ==
- List of partially lost films
