= Officer 666 (1920 film) =

1920 film

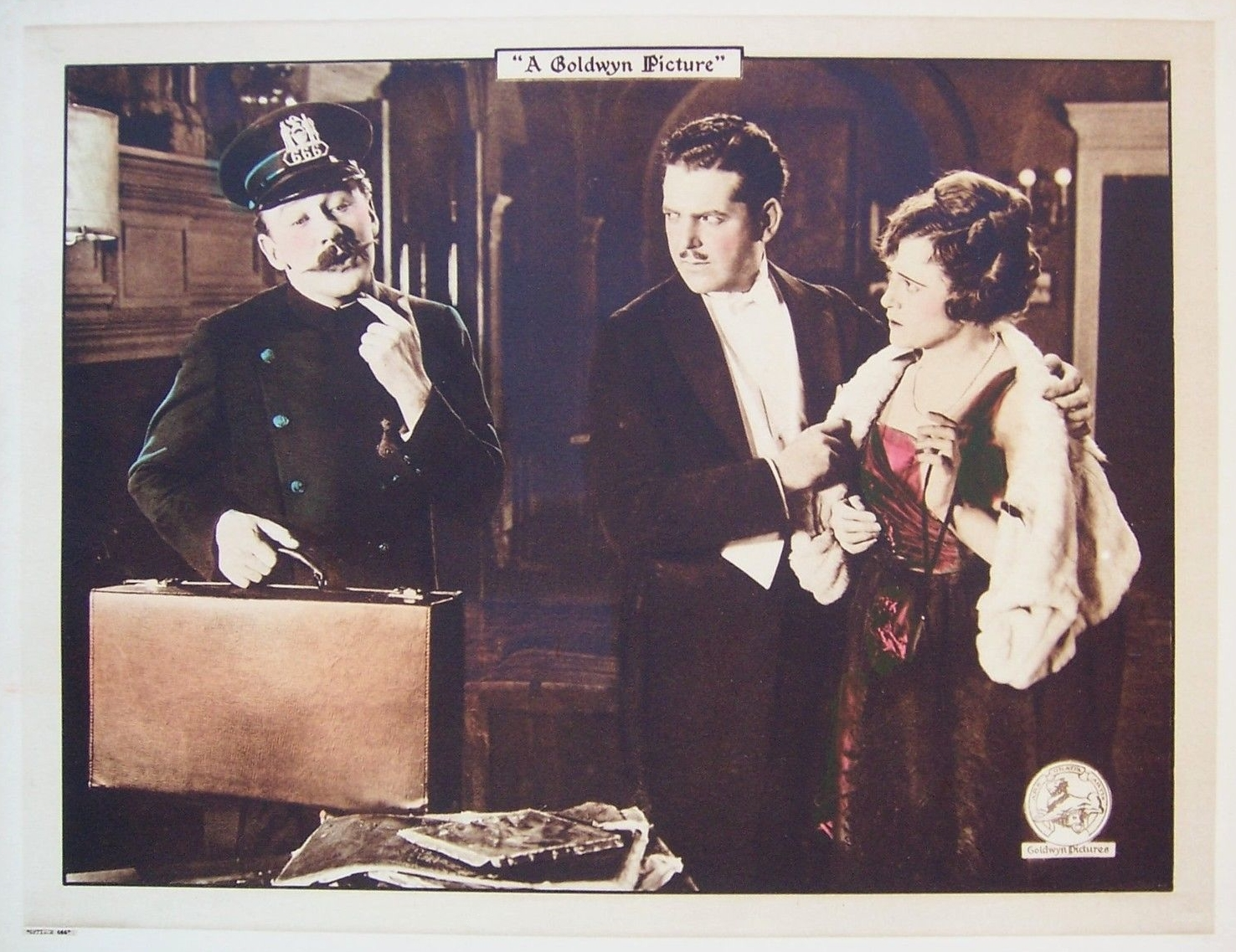
- Lobby card
- Directed by: Harry Beaumont
- Written by: Gerald Duffy (scenario)
- Based on: Officer 666 by Augustin MacHugh
- Produced by: Goldwyn Pictures
- Starring: Tom Moore
- Cinematography: Norbert Brodine
- Distributed by: Goldwyn Pictures
- Release date: October 31, 1920
- Running time: 5 reels
- Country: United States
- Language: Silent (English intertitles)

Officer 666 is a lost 1920 American silent comedy film directed by Harry Beaumont and starring Tom Moore. It is based on a 1912 Broadway play that originally starred Wallace Eddinger. Versions of the story were filmed in 1914 and 1916. This version was produced and distributed by Goldwyn Pictures.

== Cast ==
- Tom Moore as Travers Gladwyn
- Jean Calhoun as Helen
- Jerome Patrick as Alf Wilson
- Harry Dunkinson as Policeman Phelan, Officer 666
- Raymond Hatton as Whitney Barnes
- Priscilla Bonner as Sadie
- Kate Lester as Mrs. Burton
- Hardee Kirkland as Police Captain
- Maurice Bennett Flynn as Kearney (credited as M.B. Flynn)
- George Kuwa as Bareatto
- Albert Edmondson as Watkins (credited as Al Edmundson)
