= Across the Continent =

1922 film by Phil Rosen

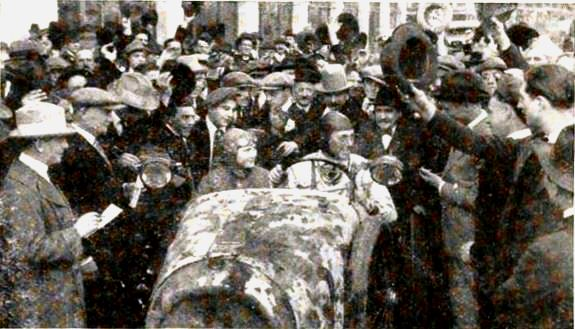
- Film still
- Directed by: Phil Rosen
- Written by: Byron Morgan
- Produced by: Adolph Zukor; Jesse L. Lasky
- Starring: Wallace Reid; Mary MacLaren; Theodore Roberts
- Cinematography: Charles Schoenbaum
- Production company: Famous Players–Lasky
- Distributed by: Paramount Pictures
- Release date: June 4, 1922
- Running time: 61 minutes (6 reels)
- Country: United States
- Language: Silent (English intertitles)

Across the Continent is a lost American silent sports film released by Paramount Pictures in June 1922, and was one of star Wallace Reid's last performances.

This film was also the opening night film of the Castro Theatre in San Francisco on June 22, 1922.

== Plot ==
As described in a film magazine, Jimmy Dent, son of John Dent the maker of the reliable but plain Dent automobiles, is dismissed from the firm after he refuses to drive a Dent. He goes west with the Tyler family, owners of a rival automobile firm, in one of their expensive high speed cars. The elder Dent attempts to break the cross-country record held by a Tyler automobile with a Dent vehicle, but Tyler's men waylay his drivers. Jimmy offers a cash prize for a free-for-all cross-country race, and drives the Dent when his father's driver betrays him. He passes the slate of drivers when rain in the mountains ties them up and wins the race driving the trusty Dent. Jimmy ends up marrying the elder Dent's effective stenographer Louise Fowler, who dons a mechanic's overalls to help in the big finish.

== Cast ==
- Wallace Reid as Jimmy Dent
- Mary MacLaren as Louise Fowler
- Theodore Roberts as John Dent
- Betty Francisco as Lorraine Tyler
- Walter Long as Dutton Tyler
- Lucien Littlefield as Scott Tyler
- Jack Herbert as Art Roger
- Guy Oliver as Irishman
- Sidney D'Albrook as Tom Brice

== Production ==
The Dent automobiles were Ford Model T's with disguised radiators.

== Preservation ==
With no holdings located in archives, Across the Continent is considered a lost film.

== See also ==
- Wallace Reid filmography
