= The Dawn of a Tomorrow =

The Dawn of a Tomorrow may refer to:

- The Dawn of a Tomorrow (1924 film), a 1924 silent film drama
- The Dawn of a Tomorrow (1915 film), a 1915 silent film
- The Dawn of a Tomorrow, a novel by Frances Hodgson Burnett
- The Dawn of a Tomorrow, a 1909 play starring Eleanor Robson Belmont
