= The Thrill Hunter =

The Thrill Hunter is the title of two films:

- The Thrill Hunter (1926 film), an American silent comedy adventure film
- The Thrill Hunter (1933 film), an American pre-Code comedy film
