= Sequoia University =

Educational institution in Los Angeles, California

Sequoia University was an unaccredited higher education institution in Los Angeles, California, which acquired a reputation as a prolific "degree mill" selling degree certificates. Although it was apparently shut down in 1984 by a court order, it appears on a short list of bogus educational institutions issued by the FBI in 1986. It is most notable today as the institution from which Scientology founder L. Ron Hubbard obtained an honorary "Doctorate of Philosophy" in the 1950s.

In 2009, the British government released a series of documents from the California Department of Education stating that Sequoia was never approved nor recognized as a school.

== Ownership and operations ==
The "university" was originally known as the College of Drugless Healing. Despite claims that it operated strictly through a post office box and delivered mail-order doctorates without classes or exams, it actually had a number of locations and classes through its storied history. It was unofficially founded in 1950 by psychologist David Seabury, who was both its President and also had an honorary PhD from Sequoia University.

Sequoia University initially operated in combination with Seabury University at 535 S. Hoover, Room 426 from 1950. Both Sequoia University Press and graduation ceremonies were also held at 5617 Hollywood Blvd, Room 103. It also had a satellite location at 2610 W. 8th, Room 3 in 1951. It later relocated to 920 S. Grandview St. in 1952.

It officially changed its name to Sequoia University on August 20, 1952, and became ratified on August 27, 1952 under a chiropodist named Joseph Hough. It relocated to his home at 915 S. Grandview, from 1952-1956. In 1956, it eventually moved to 5625 Melrose Avenue.

The university also had various departments: a library, a Slavic studies department, Russian, Spanish and other languages, psychology and psychotherapy, and others. Hough's own doctorate was said to have been bogus, reportedly having been purchased from the unaccredited Free University of Mexico in 1938. He was investigated in 1957 by a California State Assembly investigation into degree mills operating in the state, but took the Fifth Amendment 22 times in the course of his testimony and refused to divulge information about Sequoia's activities.

During a legal crackdown on unaccredited Californian educational institutions in 1984, a Los Angeles judge issued a permanent injunction ordering it to cease operating "until it complies with the state education laws." At the time it had outlets in both California and Oklahoma, and was still offering degrees in osteopathic medicine, religious studies, hydrotherapy, and physical sciences. Among the affected was the Federal government as evidenced by a citation proclaimed by the United States House of Representatives in hearings held in 1986, in which Sequoia was mentioned as one of a number of degree mills from which Federal employees had bought false credentials.

== Notable alumni ==
=== L. Ron Hubbard ===
In the early 1950s, L. Ron Hubbard established himself in London at the head of the newly founded Hubbard Association of Scientologists International. Hubbard appears to have already had a relationship with Hough, as Scientologists found themselves being given Ph.Ds from the "university." On February 27, 1953, Hubbard cabled his associate Richard de Mille (a relative of the famous filmmaker Cecil B. DeMille) to instruct him to purchase a Ph.D. in Hubbard's name. Shortly afterwards, Hubbard received a "Doctorate of Philosophy" from Sequoia, along with a "D. Scn" (Doctorate of Scientology) which he appears to have bestowed upon himself. The degree subsequently became a key part of his self-promotional efforts. Hubbard began referring to himself as "L. Ron Hubbard, Ph.D., C.E." (the C.E. referring to an equally unearned civil engineering qualification supposedly obtained from George Washington University, from which he had dropped out in his second year of studies). He presented it as evidence of his scientific qualifications, calling himself "Doctor Hubbard".

Hubbard also envisaged using Sequoia to bestow a variety of "degrees" on students of his proposed "Freudian Foundation of America", a scheme which he put forward in April 1953 but which apparently never got off the ground. The students would have received certificates from Sequoia accrediting them as "Bachelor of Scientology," "Doctor of Scientology," "Freudian Psycho-analyst," and "Doctor of Divinity," among other qualifications. He may have abandoned the idea for legal reasons.

Public attention was drawn to Hubbard's "degree" by the Anderson Report of 1965, published in Victoria, Australia. The board of enquiry that produced the report was suspicious of the degree's validity and, in its words,

caused inquiries to be made as to the identity of this university and was informed by the Australian Consul-General in San Francisco that the Sequoia University was a privately endowed institution which was not accredited, that is, not registered with the Western Association of Schools and colleges, which is the accrediting body for the west coast of America.

The question of the degree also attracted comment in the British press, forcing Hubbard onto the defensive. He issued a policy letter in February 1966 defending his degree: "I was a Ph.D., Sequoia's [sic] University and therefore a perfectly valid doctor under the laws of the State of California". The latter claim was not true, as Sequoia had never been accredited by the State, nor had it any chance of being — as Christopher Evans notes, it "used to be well known to quacks on the West Coast as a degree mill where 'qualifications' could be bought for suitable sums." Hubbard announced that henceforth the title of "Doctor" would no longer be used within Scientology, as "the name has been disgraced" due to "the abuses and murders carried out under the title of 'doctor'" (a reference to his hatred of psychiatry). A few weeks later, Hubbard publicly disclaimed his Sequoia degree in an advertisement in the personal column of The Times. However, even after this disavowal Hubbard continued to cite the Sequoia-issued Ph.D. In an interview with Rhodesian television in April 1966, he told the interviewer: "Actually I have a degree in philosophy, a Doctor of Philosophy". Similarly, biographies published by the Church of Scientology also continued to mention the "doctorate"; the 1973 book Mission Into Time, being an example.

=== Forrest J. Ackerman ===
L. Ron Hubbard's literary agent Forrest J Ackerman received a diploma from Sequoia University in April 1969, which named him a Fellow of the Sequoia Research Institute.

=== Kelly Segraves ===
Sequoia University is also part of a controversy surrounding the credentials of Kelly Segraves, director of the Creation Science Research Center, a creationist organization. Segraves claims to have received a Master's degree from Sequoia University in 1972 and has been criticized over the institution's lack of academic credentials.

=== Richard de Mille ===
In 1953, then-Scientologist Richard de Mille was an associate professor at Sequoia University. He taught at the Department of Scientology.

=== Paul Reps ===
In 1951, American zen poet Paul Reps published his second book "Unknot The World In You" through Sequoia University Press.

=== David B. Steinman ===
Sequoia awarded an honorary Doctor of Science in Engineering to David B. Steinman received on April 15, 1952.

=== David Seabury ===
Seabury unofficially founded the university in 1950. He was both its President and also had an honorary PhD from Sequoia University. He later claimed he had worked at and obtained a degree from Pacific International University, not Sequoia.

=== Johnston Murray ===
Former Governor of Oklahoma Johnston Murray received an honorary degree of Doctor of Law on July 7, 1952.

=== Jack B. Tenney ===
In 1953, California State Senator Jack B. Tenney gave the commencement address and received an honorary Doctor of Humanities.

=== Edward Leo Delaney ===
In 1954, actor turned propagandist Edward Leo Delaney published his first book "False Freedom" through Sequoia University Press.

=== Mickey Rooney ===
In May 1956, Sequoia University awarded actor Mickey Rooney an honorary PhD in Fine Arts.

=== Devendra Varma ===
In 1968, literary scholar Devendra Varma received a fellowship of the Sequoia Research Institute, a subsidiary of Sequoia University.
