= Alma Bennett =

American actress (1904–1958)

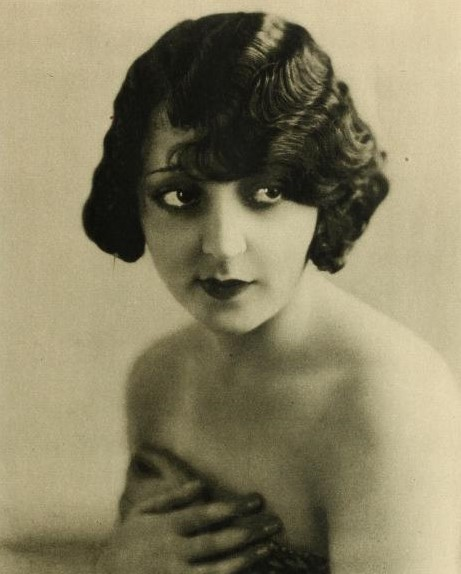
- Publicity photo of Bennett from Stars of the Photoplay (1924)
- Born: Alma Long; April 9, 1904; Seattle, Washington, U.S.
- Died: September 16, 1958 (aged 54); Los Angeles, California, U.S.
- Resting place: Chapel of the Pines Crematory
- Occupation: Actress
- Years active: 1919–1931
- Spouses: Frederick Clayton Bennett (m. 1924; div. 1928) Harry Spingler (m. 1929; died 1953) Blackie Whiteford (m. 1954)

Alma Bennett (born Alma Long; April 9, 1904 – September 16, 1958) was an American film actress of the silent era. She appeared in more than 60 films between 1919 and 1931.

== Early years ==
Alma Bennett was born Alma Long on April 9, 1904 in Seattle. She was educated in San Francisco.

== Career ==
Bennett made her film debut in the 1919 short His Friend's Trip, followed by His Master's Voice, and The Right to Happiness, which starred Dorothy Phillips and William Stowell.

Bennett specialized in westerns and vamp roles. She appeared in films such as The Face on the Bar-Room Floor (1923), The Dawn of a Tomorrow (1924), A Fool and His Money (1925), starring Madge Bellamy, The Lost World (1925), and the Colleen Moore film Orchids and Ermine (1927).

Bennett's final screen appearance was in the 1931 short The Great Pie Mystery.

== Personal life and death ==
In the mid-1920s, Bennett was married to Fred Bennett, who was brother of her mother's husband, Charles Bennett. On August 16, 1929, Bennett married her manager, Harry Spingler, in Los Angeles.

Bennett died on September 16, 1958, in Los Angeles, California. She is interred at Chapel of the Pines Crematory in Los Angeles.

== Partial filmography ==
- Thieves' Clothes (1920)
- The Affairs of Anatol (1921)
- The Face on the Bar-Room Floor (1923)
- Three Jumps Ahead (1923)
- Man's Size (1923)
- Lilies of the Field (1924)
- Why Men Leave Home (1924)
- The Dawn of a Tomorrow (1924)
- Triumph (1924)
- The Cyclone Rider (1924)
- The Silent Watcher (1924)
- The Price of Success (1925)
- The Lost World (1925)
- The Light of Western Stars (1925)
- Don Juan's Three Nights (1926)
- The Silent Lover (1926)
- Brooding Eyes (1926)
- The Thrill Hunter (1926)
- Long Pants (1927)
- Orchids and Ermine (1927)
- The Grain of Dust (1928)
- The Head of the Family (1928)
- The Good-Bye Kiss (1928)
- Two Men and a Maid (1929)
- Painted Faces (1929)
- New Orleans (1929)
- My Lady's Past (1929)
- Midnight Daddies (1930)
