= Devendra Varma =

Expert on Gothic literature

- Born: October 17, 1923; Darbhanga, British India
- Died: October 24, 1994 (aged 71); Oceanside, New York, US
- Citizenship: Canadian
- Education: University of Leeds
- Occupation: Literary scholar
- Notable work: The Gothic Flame: being a history of the Gothic Novel in England; The Evergreen Tree of Diabolical Knowledge

Devendra Prasad Varma (17 October 1923 - 24 October 1994) was an Indian Canadian literary scholar and an expert on Gothic fiction. He was particularly well known for The Gothic Flame: being a history of the Gothic Novel in England and The Evergreen Tree of Diabolical Knowledge, and also for making available hundreds of Gothic tales.

== Early life and education ==
Devendra Varma was born in Darbhanga, India, in October 1923. He studied at Patna College, where he was strongly influenced by his English professors, and later went to obtain a PhD at the University of Leeds under Professor G. Wilson Knight. In 1968, Varma had also "received a ‘distinction of honor’ from the State of California and a fellowship for ‘outstanding ability and signal evidence of scholarship and proficiency in research" from a subsidiary of the degree mill Sequoia University.

Varma joined the 6th Queen Elizabeth's Own Gurkha Rifles regiment and fought for the British Indian Army during World War II. Varma was wounded during an airborne and amphibious attack on Rangoon by British, American and Indian forces during the Burma Campaign (April–May, 1945). The attack was dubbed Operation Dracula.

== Career ==
Varma taught in India, Nepal, Syria and Egypt before moving to Canada where he became a lecturer at Dalhousie University in 1963 and then full professor in 1969.

In 1957, Varma's book The Gothic Flame was published. Herbert Read said in an introduction that in this work, Varma "rescued a dream literature from oblivion". Based on his work in this book, Varma has been credited as one of the first to distinguish between terror and horror.

During Varma's career, he oversaw publication of hundreds of Gothic tales, many of which were rare or dismembered. He was noted for saying of this work: "My researches are archival... You'll find 40 pages in one treasure room, another 50 with a collector, the title page somewhere else."

Varma was particularly interested in vampires. He wrote the introduction to the reprint of Varney the Vampire and, in 1973, he travelled to Castle Dracula to research Bram Stoker's novel.

Varma edited the seven volumes of "horrid novels" mentioned in Northanger Abbey when they were reissued by the Folio Society in the 1960s.

In 1968, Varma received a fellowship of the Sequoia Research Institute, a subsidiary of Sequoia University.

In 1977, Varma was awarded the Queen Elizabeth II Silver Jubilee Medal for contributing to education and the arts. He was also recognised by the International Association for the Fantastic in the Arts in 1993.

Varma retired in 1991 and died of a stroke whilst on a lecture tour in Oceanside, New York in 1994. He was survived by his son, Hemen, and two grandchildren, Tami and Robin.

== Commemoration ==
The Department of English at Dalhousie holds an annual "Varma celebration" at Halloween. The Varma Prize in Gothic Literature was established to celebrate Gothic and horror tales.
