= Florence Guy Seabury =

American journalist and feminist essayist

Florence Guy Seabury (formerly Woolston; April 1881 – October 6, 1951) was an American journalist and feminist essayist, and a member of Heterodoxy.

== Early life and education ==
Florence Guy was born in 1881 in Montclair, New Jersey, the daughter of Ernest Guy and Cordelia Clark Guy. She studied sociology at Columbia University.

== Career ==
Woolston worked as a teacher in the Settlement movement in New York City during the 1910s. She was on the editorial staff of the Russell Sage Foundation, and editor of The Woman Voter, a suffrage magazine. She was a regular contributor to Harper's, The New Republic, Redbook, The Nation, and other popular periodicals, often writing humorous observational essays about gender.

In 1919, she wrote a satirical essay on the "marriage customs" of the women of Heterodoxy, a feminist debating club she belonged to; it was partly modeled on Heterodite Elsie Clews Parsons' serious study of family dynamics, The Family. Her comic essays were collected in The Delicatessen Husband and Other Essays (1926), illustrated by Clarence Day. She also published a book on marital relations, Love is a Challenge (1936), and another, We, the Women (1938).

== Personal life ==
Florence Guy married sociologist Howard B. Woolston in 1904. She married her second husband, psychologist David Seabury, in 1923. Both marriages ended in divorce. She died in 1951, age 70.

In 2015, Florence Guy Seabury was included in a large-scale wall diagram of American feminist history, Andrea Geyer's Revolt, They Said, at the Museum of Modern Art.
