= His Secretary =

1925 film

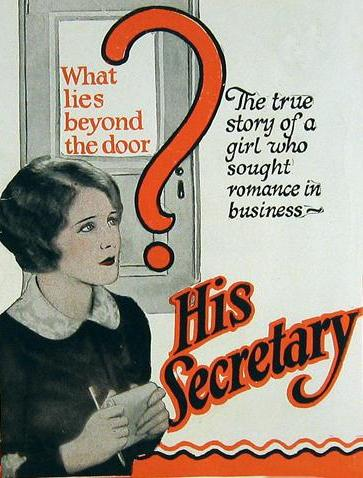
- Theatrical release poster
- Directed by: Hobart Henley
- Written by: Joseph Farnham (titles); Louis D. Lighton; Hope Loring
- Story by: Frederica Sagor Maas (uncredited); Carey Wilson
- Starring: Norma Shearer; Lew Cody
- Cinematography: Ben F. Reynolds
- Edited by: Frank Davis
- Distributed by: Metro-Goldwyn-Mayer
- Release date: December 6, 1925 (U.S.)
- Running time: 70 mins.
- Country: United States
- Language: Silent (English intertitles)

His Secretary is a 1925 American silent comedy film directed by Hobart Henley. The film stars Norma Shearer and Lew Cody.

== Plot ==
As described in a film magazine review, Ruth, a young woman who is in love with her employer but is ignored by him and all other men, learns the reason for her unpopularity while she is on a trip as her employer’s secretary. She overhears her boss saying he would not kiss her for a thousand dollars. After their return, and after a change in her character and outlook, her employer attempts to make love to her. She rejects him in a manner that piques him, and later he declares his love for her.

== Cast ==
- Norma Shearer as Ruth Lawrence
- Lew Cody as David Colman
- Willard Louis as John Sloden
- Karl Dane as Janitor
- Gwen Lee as Clara Bayne
- Mabel Van Buren as Mrs. Sloden
- Estelle Clark as Minnie
- Donald Reed as Head Clerk (credited as Ernest Gillen)

== Preservation ==
With no prints of His Secretary located in any film archives, it is a lost film.
