= After Midnight (1927 film) =

1927 film by Monta Bell

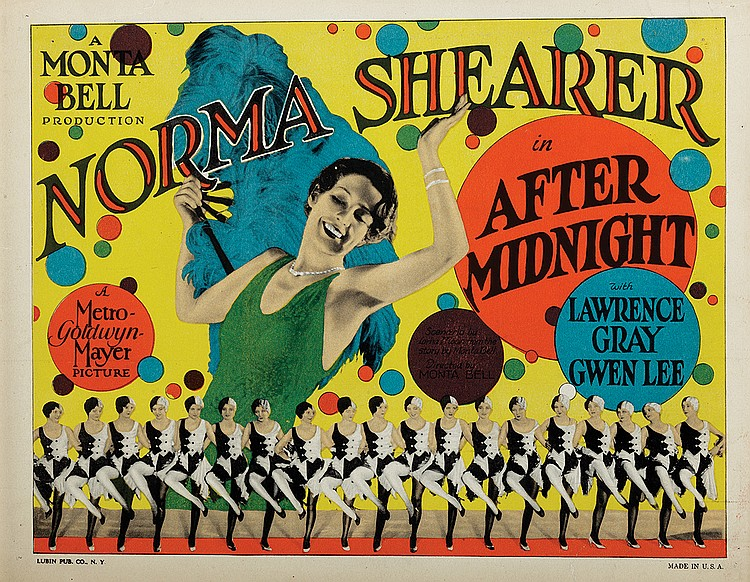
- Lobby card
- Directed by: Monta Bell
- Written by: Joseph Farnham (titles); Lorna Moon
- Story by: Monta Bell
- Starring: Norma Shearer; Gwen Lee
- Cinematography: Percy Hilburn (*French)
- Edited by: Blanche Sewell
- Distributed by: Metro-Goldwyn-Mayer
- Release date: August 20, 1927
- Running time: 70 minutes
- Country: United States
- Languages: Silent; English intertitles

After Midnight is a 1927 American silent drama film written and directed by Monta Bell. The film stars are Norma Shearer and Gwen Lee. A copy of After Midnight is housed in the Cinémathèque Française.

== Synopsis ==
A story of New York's nightlife: Mary is a cabaret hostess with a heart of gold, and her sister Maizie is a gold-digger with no heart.

== Cast ==
- Norma Shearer as Mary Miller
- Lawrence Gray as Joe Miller
- Gwen Lee as Maizie
- Eddie Sturgis as Red Smith
- Philip Sleeman as Gus Van Gundy
