= Min and Bill =

1930 film

- 1930 re-release poster
- Directed by: George W. Hill
- Written by: Frances Marion; Marion Jackson
- Based on: Dark Star; 1929 novel by Lorna Moon
- Produced by: George W. Hill; Harry Rapf
- Starring: Marie Dressler; Wallace Beery
- Cinematography: Harold Wenstrom
- Edited by: Basil Wrangell
- Distributed by: Metro-Goldwyn-Mayer
- Release date: November 29, 1930
- Running time: 66 minutes
- Country: United States
- Language: English
- Box office: $2 million

Min and Bill is a 1930 American pre-Code comedy-drama film, directed by George W. Hill and starring Marie Dressler and Wallace Beery. Adapted by Frances Marion and Marion Jackson from Lorna Moon's 1929 novel Dark Star, the film tells the story of dockside innkeeper Min's tribulations as she tries to protect the innocence of her adopted daughter, Nancy, while loving and fighting with boozy fisherman Bill, who resides at the inn. The picture was a runaway hit. In 1931, the studio released a Spanish-language version of Min and Bill, La fruta amarga, directed by Arthur Gregor and starring Virginia Fábregas and Juan de Landa.

Min and Bill stars Dressler (Min), Beery (Bill), Dorothy Jordan (Nancy), and Marjorie Rambeau (Bella). Dressler won the Academy Award for Best Actress in 1931 for her performance in this film.

Beery became MGM's highest-paid actor in the early 1930s, before Clark Gable took over that crown; Beery had a clause in his 1932 contract that he be paid a dollar per year more than any other actor on the lot.

In 1933, the studio teamed Dressler and Beery as a married couple in Tugboat Annie, which was also a huge success. In 1933, Dressler topped Quigley Publications' annual Top Ten Money Making Stars Poll of movie exhibitors in 1931 and 1932. She died of cancer in July 1934.

Min and Bill (1930)

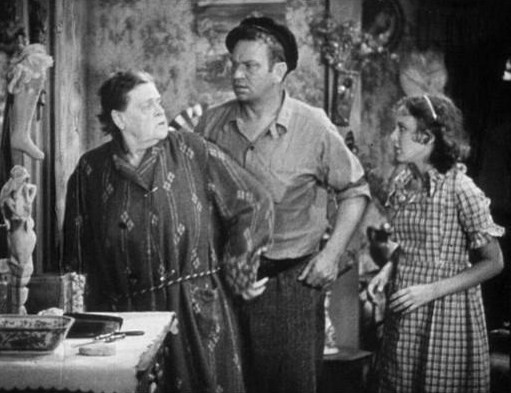
Min, Bill and Nancy

== Plot ==
Min Divot runs a dockside inn in an American port city. She lives with Nancy Smith, a teenage girl. Nancy is actually the daughter of Bella Pringle, a prostitute and disreputable person. When Nancy was an infant, Bella left her at Min's establishment. Nancy has never met her birth mother.

Min is close friends with Bill. a fisherman with an alcohol abuse problem. Bill and Min are the only ones who know that Bella is Nancy's mother. Min does her best to raise Nancy and keep her away from the unsavory activities on the docks. Whenever Bella tries to visit Nancy, Min makes sure that the girl is not around.

Nancy loves Min as her own mother and frequently skips school to be with her. Early in the film, Nancy accidentally takes off in a motorboat with Min onboard. Neither of them can stop the boat; they weave around the harbor barely missing ships and other obstacles before a rescuer stops the runaway. A truant officer arrives at the inn and demands that Min send Nancy to school.

Deciding that Min needs an education in a better social climate, Min sends her to a fancy boarding school. A few years later, Nancy returns as a young woman to the port. She has received an education and learned good manners. She is now engaged to a wealthy man named Dick Cameron and wants Min to attend the wedding, which is happening in a few days.

Min is thrilled with the wedding news, until she finds out that Bella is coming now to the Inn. To get Nancy to leave, Min starts an argument and says hurtful things that make Nancy leave. When Bella arrives, Min stalls her, hoping the wedding will take place and the couple can leave for their honeymoon before Bella can interfere.

A few days pass and the wedding ceremony is starting. Bella returns to the inn and confronts Min in her upstairs quarters. Bella knows that Nancy is marrying a wealthy man that day. Bella tells Min that she will blackmail Nancy and Dick until they give her money and take her into their new home.

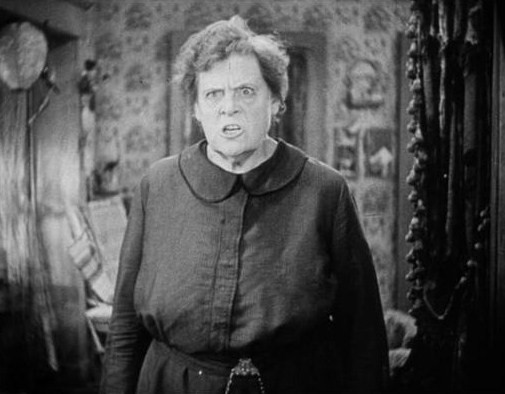
Marie Dressler

When Bella tries to leave the room for the wedding, Min stops. Bella then attacks Min with a hot curling iron and attempts to leave. Min pulls out gun and shoots her dead. She drops the gun and runs downstairs, where Bill is standing. After learning about Bella, Bill tells her she can flee to Mexico with him on his boat. to avoid arrest. However, another person in the inn overhears their conversation. After Min and Bill leave the inn for the docks, the eavesdropper enters Min's room and discovers Bella's corpse. He quickly notifies the police.

Just as Min and Bill are about to board his boat, she sees Nancy and Dick. The wedding ceremony is over and they are boarding another a boat to their honeymoon. Min approached the couple, but stays out of sight. She wants to see Nancy one last time. Two police officers quietly confront Min about the killing of Bella. Min does not say much. She takes one final look at Nancy and smiles as the officers escort to jail. A saddened Bill watches the scene helplessly.

== Cast ==
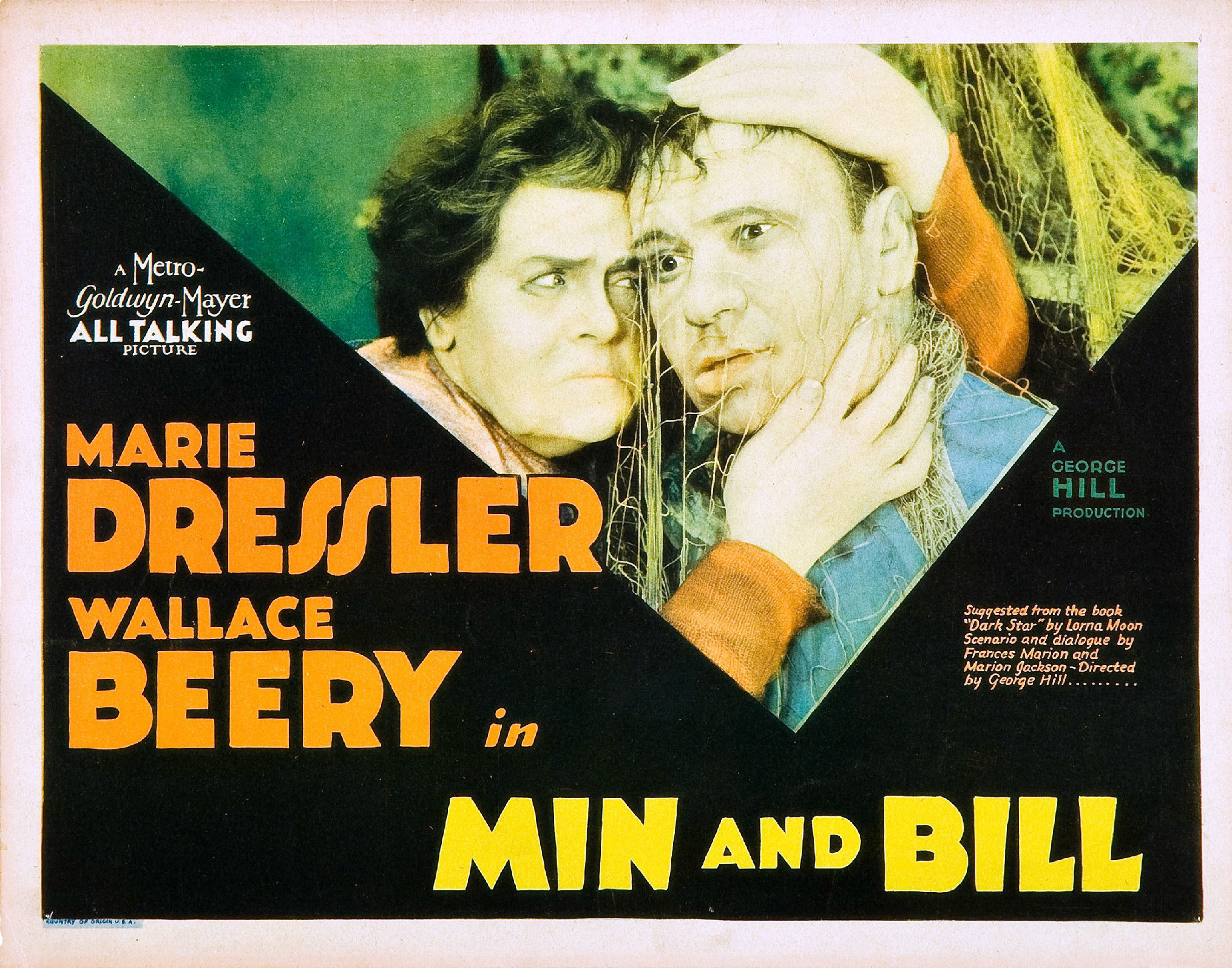
Min and Bill lobby card

- Marie Dressler as Min Divot
- Wallace Beery as Bill
- Dorothy Jordan as Nancy Smith
- Marjorie Rambeau as Bella Pringle
- Donald Dillaway as Dick Cameron
- DeWitt Jennings as Groot
- Russell Hopton as Alec Johnson
- Frank McGlynn, Sr. as Mr. Southard (credited as Frank McGlynn)
- Gretta Gould as Mrs. Southard

== In popular culture ==
Jack Kerouac, in On the Road, has his protagonist-narrator Sal Paradise compare Dean Moriarty and his second wife Camille to Min and Bill.

== Reception ==
=== Critical response ===
Leonard Maltin called it a "Sentimental early talkie with unforgettable team of Beery and Dressler ... " Leslie Halliwell gave it two of four stars: "Well-remembered and much-loved character comedy ... "

=== Box office ===
The film made a profit of $731,000.
