= The Duke Steps Out =

1929 film directed by James Cruze

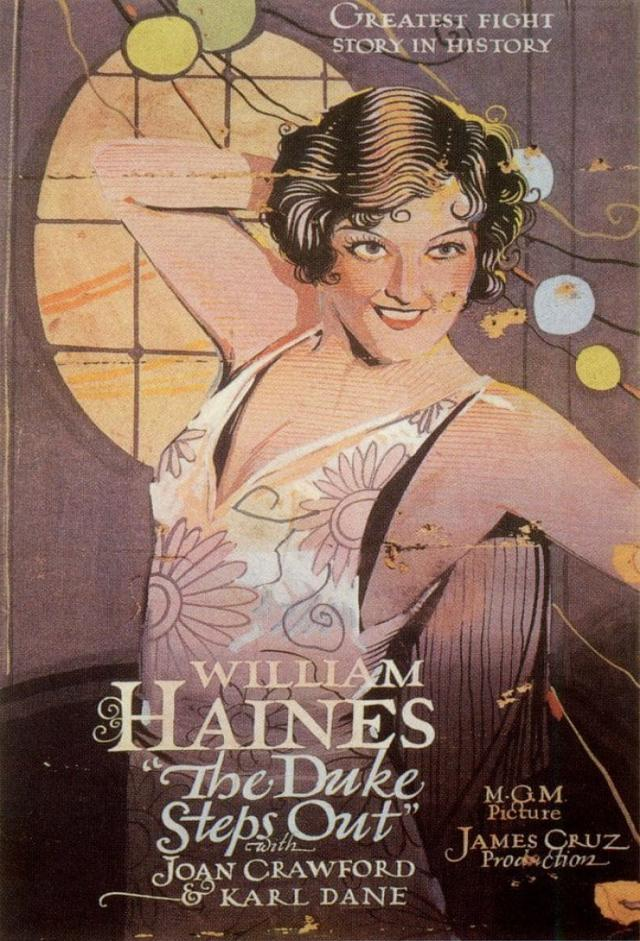
- Theatrical poster
- Directed by: James Cruze
- Written by: Raymond L. Schrock; Dale Van Every; Joseph Farnham (titles)
- Story by: Lucian Cary
- Produced by: James Cruze
- Starring: William Haines; Joan Crawford; Karl Dane; Tenen Holtz
- Cinematography: Ira H. Morgan
- Edited by: George Hively
- Music by: William Axt (uncredited)
- Distributed by: Metro-Goldwyn-Mayer
- Release date: March 16, 1929
- Running time: 62 minutes
- Country: United States
- Languages: Sound (Synchronized) (English Intertitles)
- Budget: $218,000
- Box office: $920,000

The Duke Steps Out is a 1929 American synchronized sound comedy-drama film directed by James Cruze and starring William Haines and Joan Crawford. While the film has no audible dialog, it was released with a synchronized musical score with sound effects using both the sound-on-disc and sound-on-film process. The film is lost, but the Vitaphone sound discs track of music and sound effects survive in the UCLA Film and Television Archive.

== Plot ==
Duke, a pampered millionaire's son, who longs to be a boxer, takes an interest in Susie, a college coed, after he defends her from being bullied. Duke's interest in Susie leads him to enroll in the same school as Susie. After a misunderstanding between Duke and Susie, they realize they are meant to be together and are reunited.

== Cast ==
- William Haines as Duke
- Joan Crawford as Susie
- Karl Dane as Barney, Duke's Chauffeur
- Tenen Holtz as Jake, Duke's Manager
- Edward Nugent as Tommy Wells
- Jack Roper as Poison Kerrigan
- Delmer Daves as Bossy Edwards
- Luke Cosgrave as Professor Widdicomb
- Herbert Prior as Mr. Corbin
- Gwen Lee (uncredited)
- Harold Lockwood (uncredited)
- Gertrude Messinger (uncredited)
- Marie Messinger (uncredited)

== Music ==
The film featured a theme song entitled "Just You" which was composed by William Axt, David Mendoza and Raymond Klages.

== Box office ==
According to MGM records the film earned $714,000 in the US and Canada and $206,000 elsewhere, resulting in a profit of $343,000.

== See also ==
- List of early sound feature films (1926–1929)
