= Women Love Diamonds =

1927 film

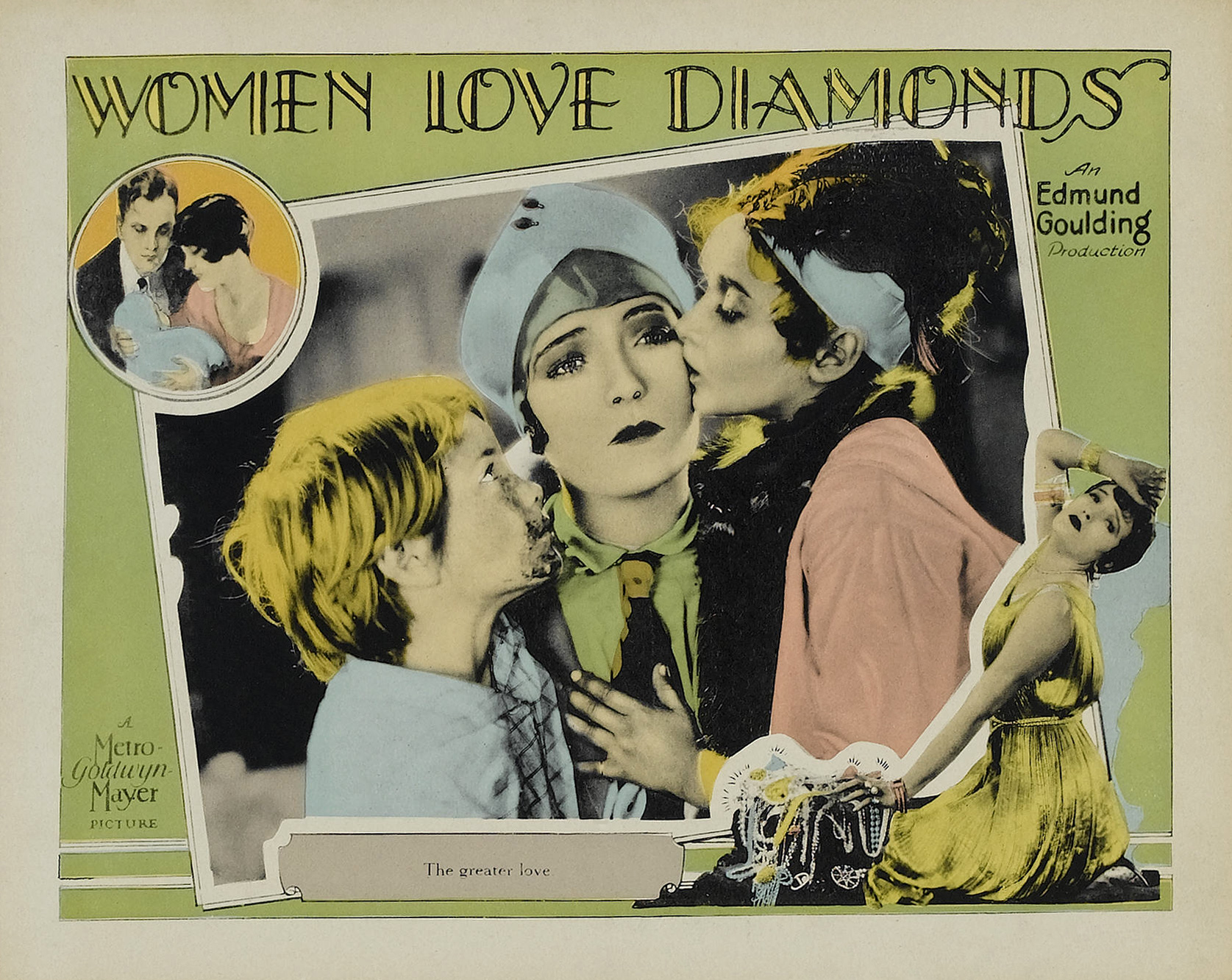
- Lobby card
- Directed by: Edmund Goulding
- Written by: Lorna Moon; Waldemar Young; Edmund Goulding; Edwin Justus Mayer
- Starring: Pauline Starke; Owen Moore; Lionel Barrymore; Douglas Fairbanks Jr.
- Cinematography: Ray Binger
- Edited by: Hugh Wynn
- Production company: Metro-Goldwyn-Mayer
- Distributed by: Loew's Inc.
- Release date: February 12, 1927
- Running time: 70 minutes
- Country: United States
- Language: Silent (English intertitles)

Women Love Diamonds is a 1927 American black and white silent melodrama directed by Edmund Goulding and starring Pauline Starke, Owen Moore, and Lionel Barrymore.

== Plot ==
Mavis Ray (Pauline Starke) is a young debutant living with her mother and with the backing of Hugo Harlan (Lionel Barrymore), whom she calls her uncle. She is in love with socialite Jerry Croker-Kelley (Douglas Fairbanks Jr.), and goes with him to meet his family against Harlan's wishes. Mavis and Jerry wish to elope if they cannot get Harlan's permission to marry. At Jerry's house, Mavis finds herself ill at ease with Jerry's family, who live simply despite their wealth. When Harlan comes to the house, he takes Jerry aside and tells him something that causes him to abandon his relationship with Mavis.

Dejected, Mavis later begins falling for her chauffeur, Patrick Michael Regan (Owen Moore). He begins falling for her as well, not caring when Mavis reveals that Harlan is not her uncle, but her lover, and that the woman she calls her mother is actually hired help. However, Patrick's sister (Dorothy Phillips), feels as if this relationship will harm Patrick. She unsuccessfully attempts to speak to Mavis, dying shortly afterwards in childbirth. Not long afterwards, Patrick gets into a car accident.

While Patrick is recovering from his wounds, Mavis takes care of his children. However, she considers herself unworthy of him. After breaking off her relationship with Harlan, Mavis runs away. Several months later, Mavis, who is now working as a nurse, encounters Patrick, who has become a taxi driver. The two decide to try to have a relationship.

== Cast ==
- Pauline Starke as Mavis Ray
- Owen Moore as Patrick Michael Regan
- Lionel Barrymore as Hugo Harlan
- Cissy Fitzgerald as Mrs. Ray
- Gwen Lee as Roberta Klein
- Douglas Fairbanks Jr. as Jerry Croker-Kelley
- Pauline Neff as Mrs. Croker-Kelley
- Constance Howard as Dorothy Croker-Kelley
- George Cooper as Snub Flaherty
- Dorothy Phillips as Mrs. Flaherty

uncredited

- Charlotte Greenwood

== Production ==
Women Love Diamonds was directed by Edmund Goulding. Greta Garbo, fresh off filming Flesh and the Devil (1927), was approached to play the lead role. However, as she was in a contract conflict with Metro Goldwyn Mayer at the time, she refused and threatened to go back to Sweden. Pauline Starke was chosen to take her place.

According to a review in Variety, the film looked as if it had an above average budget.

== Themes ==
Historian Lea Jacobs notes that Women Love Diamonds does not deal heavily with sexual mores, as would be expected, but more with the power gained from sexuality and wealth. She notes that when Mavis is dealing with the Croker-Kelleys, her "ostentious" mode of dress leads to her being looked down upon; however, with lower-class characters such as the Regans, her dress becomes a symbol of power.

== Release and reception ==
Women Love Diamonds was released on February 12, 1927. It was a commercial flop, earning $30,000 less than its budget.

The review in Variety praised the set, cinematography, and acting; however, the reviewer found the plot weakened by the film's "cautious handling" of the subject matter and noted that the star "fails to draw sufficient sympathy". The review also misidentified the film as Women Want Diamonds, which, according to Jacobs, suggests that there may have been more than one print. Film critic David Shipman writes that Mavis at first comes across as someone who women guiltily admire and men want to own, but later becomes more sympathetic after having a moral epiphany and becoming a nurse.

Jacobs described Women Love Diamonds as perhaps the strangest experiment in dramatizing the gold digger genre; she describes it as resembling the work of German director Rainer Werner Fassbinder. Matthew Kennedy, in his biography of Goulding, describes the film as "a sorry exercise all around". Hal Erickson, writing for Rovi, suggests that Garbo's refusal to do the film did not hurt her career at all.

== Preservation status ==
- This film survives as an MGM laboratory preservation effort.
