= Going Crooked =

1926 film

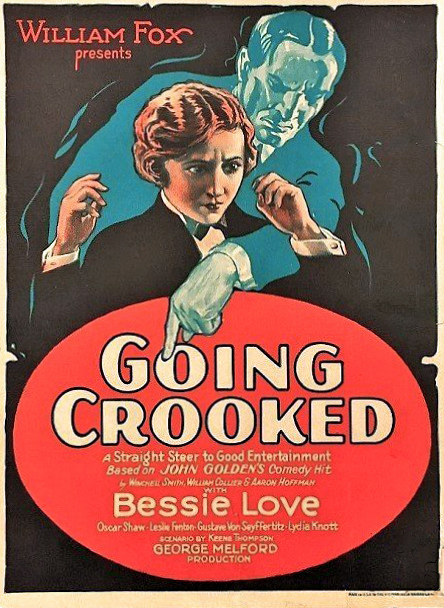
- Theatrical poster
- Directed by: George Melford
- Written by: Albert S. Le Vino; Keene Thompson; William Counselman (intertitles)
- Based on: Going Crooked: a Comedy in Three Acts, from a Tale of Hoffman's (Aaron's) (play) by; Winchell Smith; William Collier; Aaron Hoffman; One Hundred Thousand Dollars Reward (unpublished play) by Aaron Hoffman
- Produced by: William Fox
- Starring: Bessie Love
- Cinematography: Charles G. Clarke
- Distributed by: Fox Film Corporation
- Release date: December 12, 1926 (U.S.)
- Running time: 6 reels; 5,345 feet
- Country: United States
- Language: Silent (English intertitles)

Going Crooked is a 1926 American silent crime film produced and distributed by the Fox Film Corporation. It was directed by George Melford and stars Bessie Love.

The film is preserved at the Museum of Modern Art, the George Eastman House, and the Bibliothèque nationale de France.

== Plot ==
Mordaunt and his gang use Marie as an unwitting accomplice in the theft of the acclaimed Rajah diamond. During the heist, a man is killed, and innocent Rogers is later sentenced to death for the murder.

Marie works with District Attorney Banning to get Mordaunt to confess, just in time to save Rogers from the electric chair. Marie and Shaw are married.

== Cast ==
- Bessie Love as Marie Farley
- Oscar Shaw as Banning
- Gustav von Seyffertitz as Mordaunt
- Edgar Kennedy (as Ed Kennedy) as Detective
- Leslie Fenton as Rogers
- Lydia Knott as Mother
- Bernard Siegel as Crook
- Evelyn Selbie

== Production ==
For authenticity, some scenes were filmed on Ferguson Alley in Chinatown, Los Angeles.

== Reception ==
The film received positive reviews, with Love and von Seyffertitz receiving high acclaim for their performances.
