= Lorna Moon =

British author and screenwriter

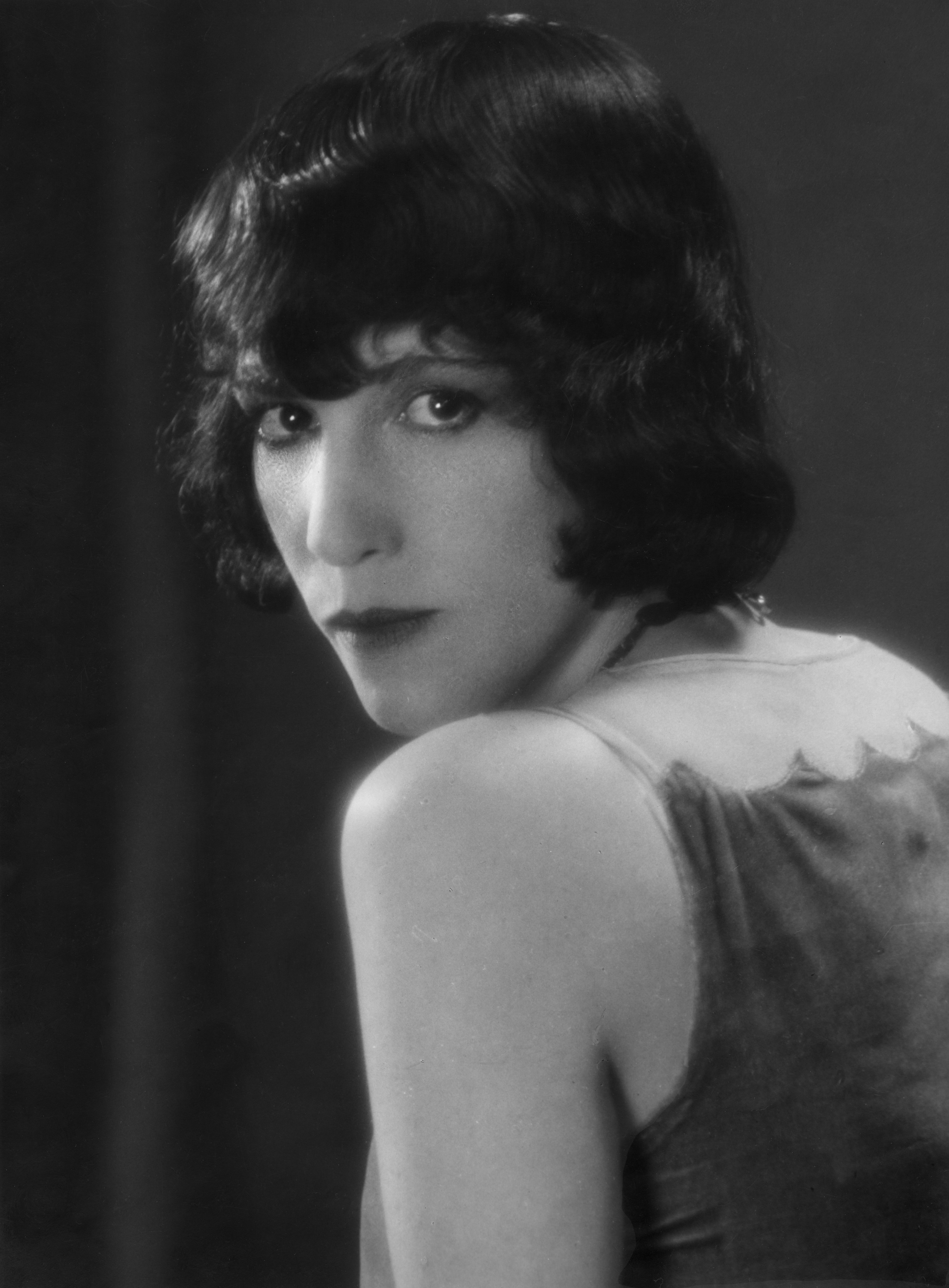
- Moon in 1926
- Born: Nora Helen Wilson Low; 16 June 1886; Strichen, Aberdeenshire
- Died: 1 May 1930 (aged 43); Albuquerque, New Mexico, U.S.
- Occupations: Author, screenwriter
- Spouse(s): William Hebditch (m. 1907; sep. 1913) (married until her death)
- Children: 3, including Richard de Mille

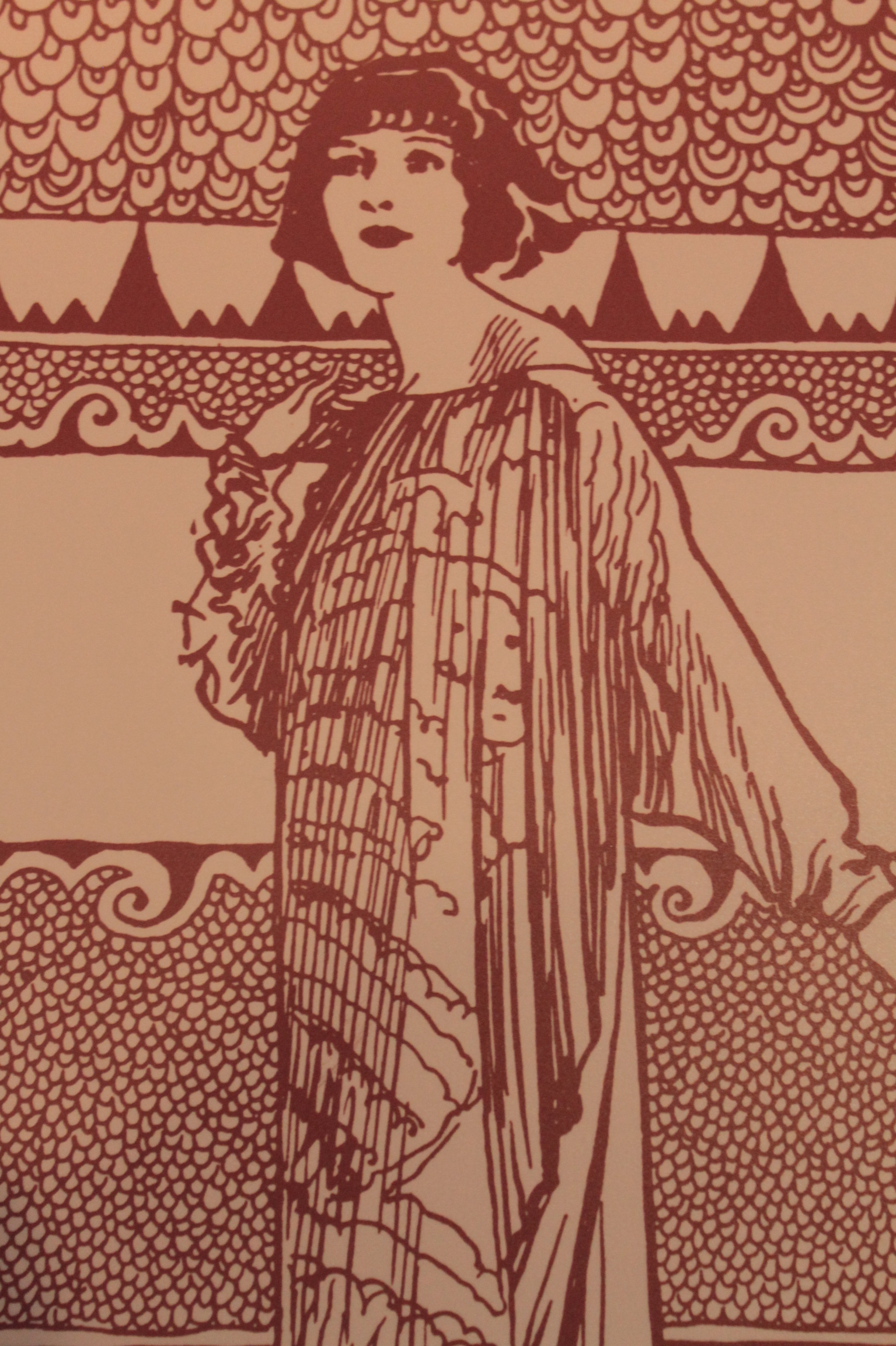
Lorna Moon poster 1910

Lorna Moon (born Nora Helen Wilson Low; 16 June 1886 – 1 May 1930) was a British author and screenwriter from the early days of Hollywood. She is best known as the author of the bestselling novel Dark Star (1929) and as one of the earliest and most successful female screenwriters. As a screenwriter, she developed screenplays for notables including Gloria Swanson, Norma Shearer, Lionel Barrymore and Greta Garbo.

== Life ==
Moon was born in Strichen, Aberdeenshire, in 1886, to plasterer Charles Low and Margaret Benzies (1863–1945). She was a socialist and an avowed atheist. In 1907 she met William Hebditch, a commercial traveller from Yorkshire who had stayed at the hotel run by her parents. The two were secretly married in Aberdeen and shortly after the couple left Britain for Alberta in Canada, where Moon gave birth to her first child, William Hebditch (1908–1990). In 1913 she left Hebditch and had a relationship with Walter Moon, with whom she had a child, Mary Leonore Moon (1914–1978). She and Walter travelled to Winnipeg, where she began working as a journalist and where she adopted a pen-name closer to her literary inspiration, Lorna Doone.

An anecdote tells how she contacted Cecil B. DeMille and offered a critical appraisal of the screenplays of the day. He challenged her to come to Hollywood and write them herself if she thought she could do better; and by 1921 she did just that, working as a script girl and screenwriter. During her career in Hollywood she had a third child by Cecil B. DeMille's brother William. This child, Richard, grew up unaware of his mother's identity; in later years he discovered his parentage and wrote the memoir My Secret Mother, Lorna Moon.

Lorna Moon contracted tuberculosis and died in a sanatorium in Albuquerque, New Mexico, in 1930, aged 43. She was cremated and her ashes were returned to Scotland, where they were scattered on Mormond Hill near Strichen.

== Career ==
In 1920, Moon sent director Cecil B. DeMille a critique of his film Male and Female (1920) in which she "razzed him wickedly". She went on to train with DeMille at Famous Players–Lasky/Paramount Film Corporation, which later became Paramount Pictures. In the early 1920s, Moon suffered from tuberculosis and wrote short stories and plays from bed before returning to work in 1926.

In 1926, Moon worked on screenplays for Metro-Goldwyn-Mayer including Upstage (1926), After Midnight, Women Love Diamonds (1927), Mr. Wu (1927) and Love. Love was one of MGM's highest-earning films of 1927 and was considered a blockbuster, earning MGM $946,000 domestically and an additional $731,000 internationally.

In 1929, Moon's novel Dark Star was released and reached the bestseller list. The novel was later adapted by Frances Marion into the 1930 film Min and Bill, starring Marie Dressler. Min and Bill is generally thought to have revived Dressler's career.

== Screen credits ==
Her screen credits include The Affairs of Anatol (1921), Don't Tell Everything (1921), Her Husband's Trademark (1922), Too Much Wife (1922), Upstage (1926), After Midnight (1927), Women Love Diamonds (1927), Mr. Wu (1927), and Love (1927).

== Literary works ==
Her literary works include Doorways in Drumorty (1925), a collection of short stories, and the novel Dark Star (1929). Dark Star was a critical success, and in 1930 was adapted for the screen as Min and Bill, starring Marie Dressler and Wallace Beery. Doorways in Drumorty contained a series of stories set in a fictional Scottish town: however the location and characters were drawn from her memories of Strichen, much to the indignation of certain townspeople, and her work was banned from the local library.

== Recent developments ==
The Collected Works of Lorna Moon, edited by Glenda Norquay, was published in 2002. In 2008 a plaque commemorating Lorna Moon was unveiled in Strichen. In 2010 a stage play, based on the stories in Doorways in Drumorty, was written by Mike Gibb and performed around Scotland by Red Rag Theatre. Further major Scottish tours were staged by Red Rag in 2011 and by Awkward Stranger 2019. Playwright and Author Mike Gibb also wrote Drumorty Revisited, a follow-up to Lorna Moon's Doorways in Drumorty, which was published by Hame Press in 2019. A BBC Radio 4 play, I Love You, Mr DeMille, written by Sara Sheridan and based on Lorna Moon's life aired in July 2026. A film based on the life of Lorna Moon, scripted by Alison Peebles, has been proposed, with Kate Winslet being named as a potential candidate to play the title role.
