= Orchids and Ermine =

1927 film by Alfred Santell

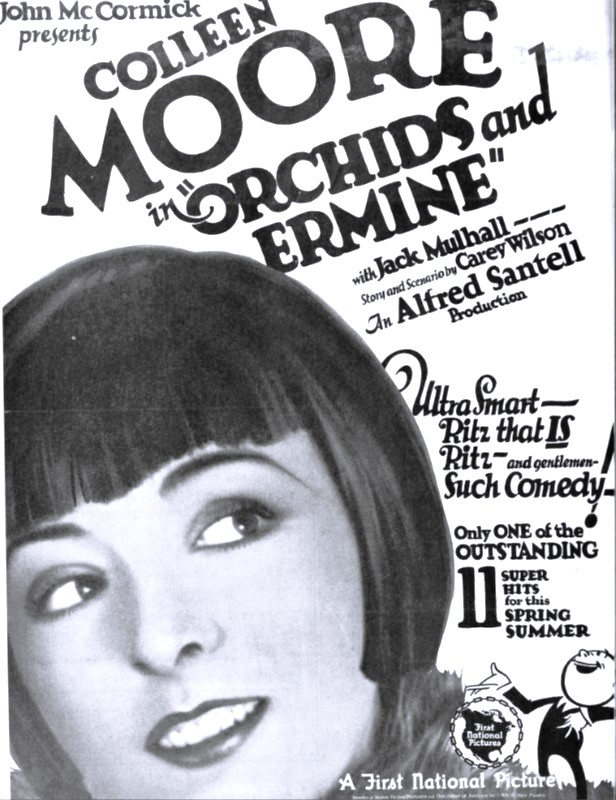
- Advertisement
- Directed by: Alfred Santell
- Written by: Carey Wilson; Mervyn LeRoy (Comedy const) (screenplay)
- Produced by: John McCormick
- Starring: Colleen Moore; Jack Mulhall; Sam Hardy; Gwen Lee
- Cinematography: George J. Folsey
- Production company: First National
- Distributed by: First National
- Release date: March 6, 1927
- Running time: 1 hour, 10 minutes
- Country: United States
- Language: Silent (English intertitles)

Orchids and Ermine is a 1927 American silent comedy film directed by Alfred Santell and starring Colleen Moore that was filmed partly on location in New York. The film still exists. This was Mickey Rooney's first feature-length film (his first film being a short subject released in 1926).

== Plot ==
In New York City, flapper Pink Watson works as a telephone operator at a cement factory and dreams of marrying rich. Her constant daydreaming of wealth annoys her fellow workers, and ruins the heart of one of her worshipping colleagues. Instead, she interviews at the De Luxe Hotel on Fifth Avenue for the job of hotel switchboard operator, and lands the position despite the large number of women soliciting. During her first day, she befriends Ermintrude De Vere, and is invited to accompany her on a date with a young millionaire named Mr. Vandergriff, who is later revealed as a scheming chauffeur at Long Island. Jenkins' boss, an old millionaire, fires him and tries to flirt with the two girls. While gold digger Ermintrude is flattered by his attention, Pink reacts appalled at the age difference and almost walks home, until a friend in the cement factory's truck picks her up.

While working the next day, an oil millionaire named Tabor checks in and is immediately set upon by gold-diggers. He swaps places with his assistant Hank and poses as a chauffeur. Pink falls for Tabor without knowing of his fortunes (even though he never lied to her: it was Ermintrude who convinced Pink that the man introducing himself as Tabor was actually his assistant), while Hank gets in trouble under the identity of his employer by charming Ermintrude. Hank quickly learns the backsides of constantly being followed by numerous gold diggers. Following his shift, he helps Tabor with the techniques to seduce a lady, because Tabor has fallen in love with Pink. These tips do not prove to be helpful, noting that when Hank puts them to test with Pink himself, he gets yelled at.

When Tabor tries to flirt with the same pick up lines, Pink is less than flattered and criticizes him for taking money from his 'boss', with which he bought orchids for her. Tabor then tries to reveal his true identity, but Pink does not believe him and tries to get rid of him in the mass of the New York streets. She eventually gets on a bus, thinking to have lost him, only to have him jumping on the same bus from another vehicle. Pink is still not impressed, until he gets hit on his head by a bridge and passes out. Feeling guilty, Pink takes care of him and falls in love, even though realizing that she will be a poor girl her entire life when she marries a valet. Hank, meanwhile, is taking Ermintrude out for dinner, during which she quickly tricks him into eloping with her.

The following morning, Tabor, now dressed as a millionaire, asks Pink to marry him, and she (thinking he has moved up in status to a department store floorwalker) enthusiastically accepts. He then again tries to reveal his true identity and spoils his fiancé with ermine fur, as well as a wedding dress in a fancy shop. Meanwhile, the shop's owner finds a photo in the newspaper featuring 'Tabor' (Hank) and Ermintrude as newlyweds, and thinks that the real Tabor is an impostor. He alerts the police, and has Tabor arrested. Devastated by what she thinks is betrayal, Pink contacts 'Tabor' (Hank) to help her get his 'valet' (Tabor) out of jail. At court, Hank initially lies about the identity switch because he is afraid of losing Ermintrude, but admits to the truth after her departure. Pink is happily reunited with Tabor and they leave for Oklahoma.

== Cast ==
Actor	Role
Colleen Moore	'Pink' Watson
Jack Mulhall	Richard Tabor
Sam Hardy	Hank
Gwen Lee	Ermintrude De Vere
Alma Bennett	The Vamp
Hedda Hopper	The Modiste
Kate Price	Mrs. McGinnis
Jed Prouty	Leander Blom
Emily Fitzroy	Mrs. Blom
Carolynne Snowden	Hattie (as Caroline Snowden)
Yola d'Avril	Telephone Operator
Brooks Benedict	Chauffeur Jenkins / Mr. Vandergriff
Loretta Young	uncredited

== Background ==
Exteriors for the film were shot on location in New York City, and shortly after the arrival of the troupe in the city the weather turned cold and rainy. This gives the film the distinction of being one of the first major motion pictures to show the streets of New York in the rain (the studio, making the most of a bad situation, chose to say they had planned for it to rain, and it was the lack of rain that had kept the troupe from returning to Los Angeles from New York on schedule). Cameras were placed in hidden locations so scenes could be shot with unsuspecting pedestrians, however when viewing the rushes of scenes just show, one news boy was seen staring directly into the camera in every shot; the sharp-eyed boy had noticed the hidden cameras in every instance.

As was often the case in Moore's films, and was one of the major attractions of her features—the viewer was treated to the latest fashions during the course of the film.

Hedda Hopper had a part in the film before she became a famous columnist. A 6-year-old Joe Yule Jr. had a part of a smooth-talking midget... Joe would become famous under the name Mickey Rooney. The film was well-reviewed.

== Preservation ==
Prints of Orchids and Ermine are located in the Library of Congress, George Eastman Museum Motion Picture Collection, CINEMATEK, UCLA Film and Television Archive, Berkeley Art Museum and Pacific Film Archive, and BFI National Archive.

== Footnotes ==
- Colleen Moore, Silent Star, Doubleday, 1968.
- Jeff Codori (2012), Colleen Moore; A Biography of the Silent Film Star, McFarland Publishing, (Print ISBN 978-0-7864-4969-9, EBook ISBN 978-0-7864-8899-5).
- Daily Illini (University of Illinois), January 30, 1927, p. 10.
