= Her Husband's Trademark =

1922 film

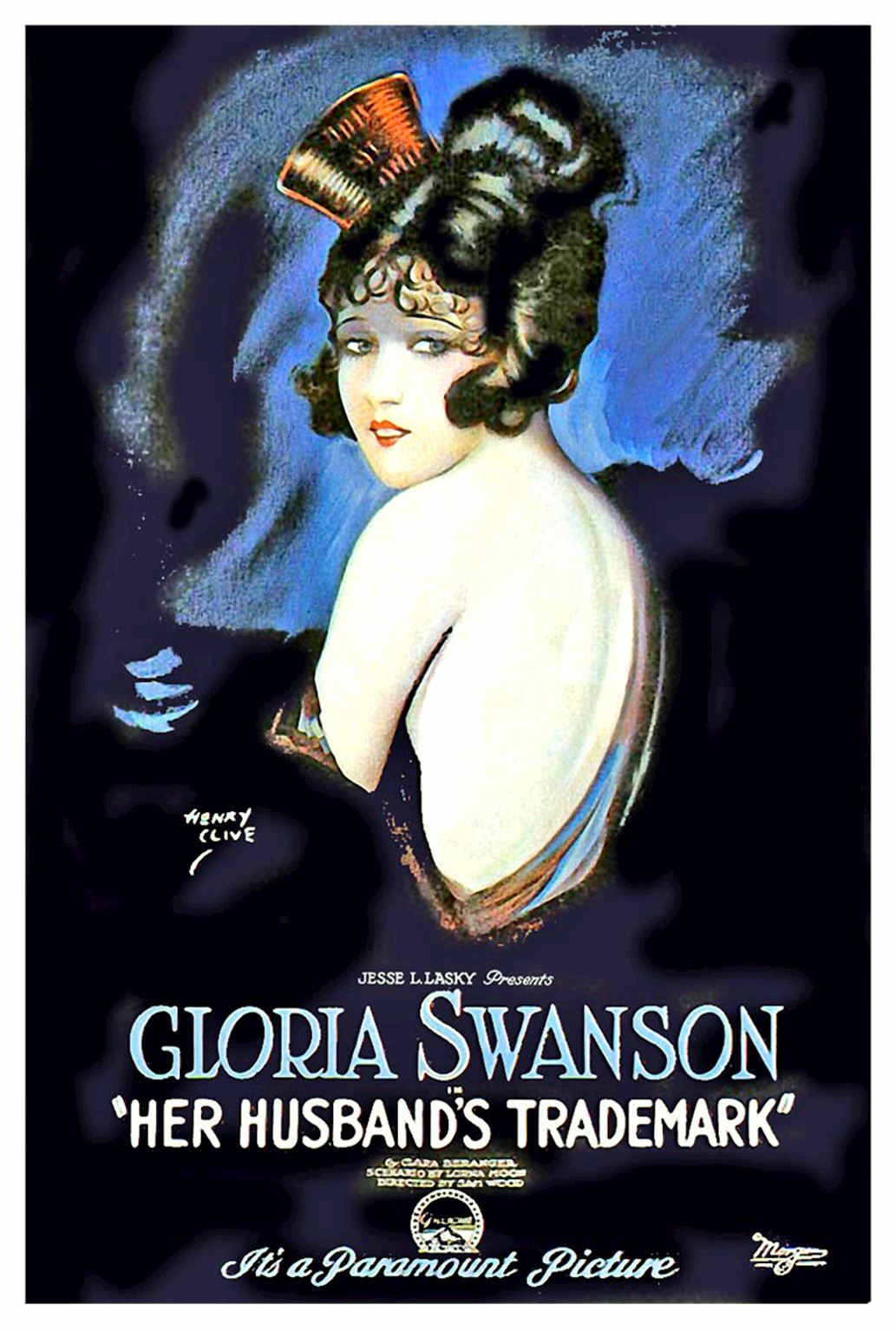
- Film poster
- Directed by: Sam Wood
- Written by: Lorna Moon
- Story by: Clara Beranger
- Produced by: Jesse L. Lasky
- Starring: Gloria Swanson; Richard Wayne
- Cinematography: Alfred Gilks
- Production company: Famous Players–Lasky
- Distributed by: Paramount Pictures
- Release date: February 1922
- Running time: 5 reels
- Country: United States
- Language: Silent (English intertitles)

Her Husband's Trademark is a 1922 American silent drama film directed by Sam Wood and starring Gloria Swanson and Richard Wayne. Produced by Famous Players–Lasky and distributed by Paramount Pictures, the film was shot on location in El Paso, Texas.

== Plot ==
As described in a film magazine, the Berkeleys are prominent in New York City society, with James, a man who bluffs at wealth, using the famed beauty of his new wife Lois to further his business interests in obtaining loans and other favors from capitalists. In the sudden acquired wealth of his old college chum Allan Franklyn, who has been absent in Mexico for some years, James sees his big opportunity. The three go to Mexico where the intended catch Allan demonstrates his love for Lois. When she learns that James has been using her solely for his own financial gain, she openly declares her affection for Allan. A bandit raids the hacienda and pursues Lois. Her husband is killed while escaping and Allan, the man she loves, carries her across the Rio Grande river to safety and the prospect of happiness.

== Cast ==
- Gloria Swanson as Lois Miller
- Richard Wayne as Allan Franklyn
- Stuart Holmes as James Berkeley
- Lucien Littlefield as Slithy Winters
- Charles Ogle as Father Berkeley
- Edythe Chapman as Mother Berkeley
- Clarence Burton as Mexican bandit
- James Neill as Henry Strom

== Preservation ==
Complete prints of Her Husband's Trademark are held by the Gosfilmofond in Moscow and the George Eastman Museum.
