= Gwen Lee =

American actress (1904–1961)

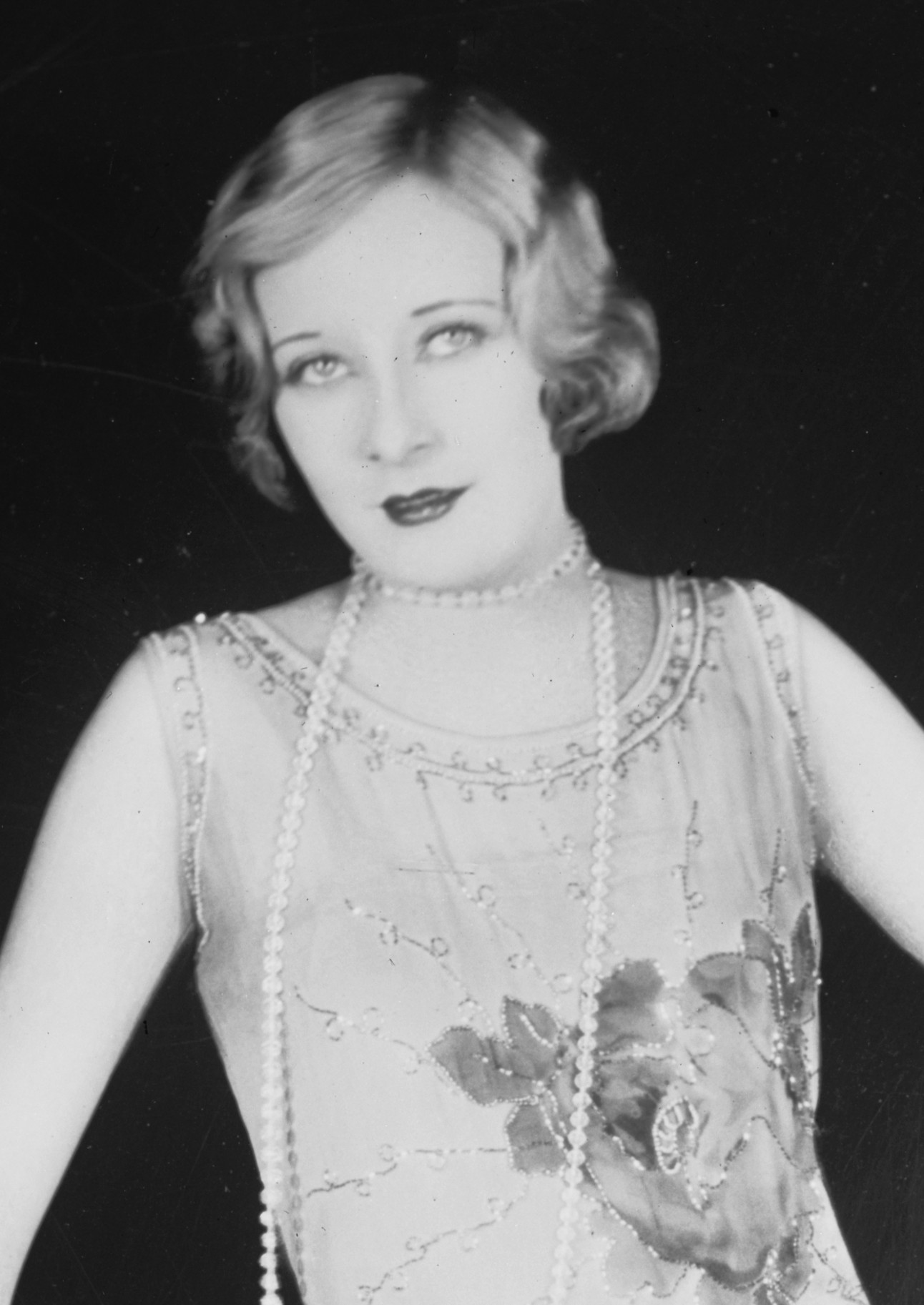
- Lee in 1927
- Born: Gwendolyn Lepinski; November 12, 1904; Hastings, Nebraska, U.S.
- Died: August 20, 1961 (aged 56); Reno, Nevada, U.S.
- Other name: Gwendolyn Lee
- Occupation: Actress
- Years active: 1925–1938

Gwen Lee (born Gwendolyn Lepinski; November 12, 1904 – August 20, 1961) was an American stage and film actress. Lee began her career as a model before being discovered and signed to Metro-Goldwyn-Mayer. She was typically cast in supporting roles. Lee appeared in over 60 films, and she retired in 1938.

== Acting career ==
Born to Mriette (née Kennedy) and Frank B. Lepinski in Hastings, Nebraska, Lee began her career as a department store model. She was discovered by director Monta Bell while appearing in a stage production. She signed a contract with Metro-Goldwyn-Mayer in 1925. The same year, she made her film debut in Lady of the Night, starring Norma Shearer. She followed with roles in Pretty Ladies, starring Zasu Pitts, His Secretary, and The Plastic Age, starring Clara Bow. In 1926, Lee was cast in The Lone Wolf Returns, starring Bert Lytell and Billie Dove.

In 1928, she was named a WAMPAS Baby Star. Lee continued her career with supporting roles in Laugh, Clown, Laugh and The Actress (both 1928). Her career continued for almost a decade into the era of sound movies. Lee played Marjory in Untamed (1929), with Joan Crawford and Robert Montgomery. She appeared again with Crawford and Marie Prevost in the prison drama Paid (1930). In 1931 MGM released Gwen Lee from its roster.

Independent companies were often delighted to sign major-studio stars, particularly those who had the advantage of MGM exposure and publicity. Both Harry Carey and Edwina Booth, who co-starred in MGM's Trader Horn, signed with Nat Levine's humble Mascot studio after being dropped by MGM. Levine also signed MGM personality Gwen Lee to appear opposite football star Red Grange in the serial The Galloping Ghost (1931). From there Lee made the rounds of the independent studios, appearing in such diverse entertainments as the crime drama The Lawless Woman with former silent star Vera Reynolds, the Western Broadway to Cheyenne (1932) with Rex Bell, and the two-reel comedy Boy, Oh Boy (1932) with Andy Clyde.

Gwen Lee rejoined MGM in 1935 as a member of the studio's stock company. No longer given starring or featured roles, she was on hand to fill incidental parts as the need arose. In the first scene of The Marx Brothers' famous MGM feature A Night at the Opera, Groucho Marx hands a restaurant bill to his surprised dinner companion -- Gwen Lee. She also had small roles in MGM features of the mid- to late 1930s, as well as in the studio's Robert Benchley and Pete Smith comedy shorts.

== Personal life ==
Lee was sued by her mother Etta Lepinski, in March 1932. Lee was charged in a petition for guardianship. The lawsuit alleged that Lee was incompetent to handle her affairs, specifically she was incapable of managing her jewellery and personal property, valued in excess of $1,000 (about $17,208 in 2019). The case was filed in Los Angeles Superior Court. Lee's mother dropped the suit in April, citing improvement in her daughter's health. Later that same year, Lee was also sued by two clothiers for nonpayment.

On May 4, 1943, she married George Mence, Jr.

== Death ==
Lee died on August 20, 1961, age 56, from undisclosed causes in Reno, Nevada.

== Filmography ==
Year	Title	Role	Notes
1925	Lady of the Night	Molly's Friend	
1925	Pretty Ladies	Fay	
1925	His Secretary	Clara Bayne	Lost film
1925	The Plastic Age	Carl's girl	Uncredited
1925	Time Flies	An Adventuress	Short film Credited as Gwendolyn Lee
1926	The Boy Friend	Pettie Wilson	Lost film
1926	The Lone Wolf Returns	Liane De Lorme	
1926	Upstage	Dixie Mason	
1926	There You Are!	Anita Grant	Lost film
1927	Women Love Diamonds	Roberta Klein	
1927	Heaven on Earth	Claire	Lost film
1927	Orchids and Ermine	Ermintrude	
1927	Twelve Miles Out	Hulda	
1927	Adam and Evil	Gwen De Vere	Lost film
1927	After Midnight	Maizie	
1927	Her Wild Oat	Daisy	
1928	Lucky Boy	Mrs. Ellis	
1928	Sharp Shooters	Flossy	
1928	Laugh, Clown, Laugh	Lucretia	
1928	The Actress	Avonia	Lost film
1928	Diamond Handcuffs	Cecile	Lost film
1928	A Thief in the Dark	Flo	Lost film
1928	Show Girl	Nita Dugan	
1928	The Baby Cyclone	Jessie	Lost film
1928	A Lady of Chance	Gwen	
1929	The Duke Steps Out		Uncredited
1929	The Man and the Moment	Viola	
1929	Fast Company	Rosie La Clerq	Incomplete film
1929	Untamed	Marjory	
1929	The Hollywood Revue of 1929	Herself	
1930	Chasing Rainbows	Peggy	
1930	Lord Byron of Broadway	Bessie	
1930	Free and Easy	Participant in Bedroom Scene	Alternative title: Easy Go
1930	Caught Short	Manicurist	
1930	Estrellados	Herself	
1930	Our Blushing Brides	Mannequin	
1930	Extravagance	Sally	
1930	Paid	Bertha	
1931	Inspiration	Gaby	
1931	The Lawless Woman	Kitty Adams	
1931	Traveling Husbands	Mabel	
1931	The Galloping Ghost	Irene Courtland	
1931	Julius Sizzer	Cleo	Short film
1931	The Pagan Lady	Gwen Willis	
1931	West of Broadway	Maizie	
1932	Alias Mary Smith	Blossom	
1932	Midnight Morals	Dora Cobb	
1932	Broadway to Cheyenne	Mrs. Myrna Wallace	
1932	Boy Oh Boy!		Short film
1933	The Intruder	Daisy	
1933	Song of the Eagle	Nails' Girl	Uncredited
1933	Corruption	Mae	
1933	Meet the Baron	Small role	Uncredited
1934	City Park	Maizie, the Hooker	
1935	$20 a Week	Ann Seymour	
1935	One in a Million	Kitty Kennedy	Alternative title: Dangerous Appointment
1935	A Night at the Opera	Driftwood's Dining Companion	Uncredited
1936	Absolute Quiet	Western Union Operator	Uncredited
1936	How to Behave	Restaurant Gossip	Short film Uncredited
1936	Fury	Mrs. Fred Garrett	Uncredited
1936	Libeled Lady	Switchboard Operator	Uncredited
1936	My Dear Miss Aldrich	Hat Saleswoman	Uncredited
1937	Give Till It Hurts	Telephone Solicitor	Short film Uncredited
1937	Double Wedding	Woman in Crowd	Uncredited
1937	A Night at the Movies	Cashier	Short film Uncredited
1937	Candid Cameramaniacs	Drowzina, Otto's Wife	Short film Uncredited
1937	Mannequin	Flo	Uncredited
1938	Man-Proof	Blonde Woman at Fight	Uncredited
1938	Pete Smith Specialty: Penny's Party	Herself	Short film
1938	Paroled from the Big House	Binnie Bell	Alternative title: Main Street Girl

== Additional sources ==
- The Los Angeles Times, Maytime Will Have Ensemble, August 19, 1923, Page III 37.
- The Los Angeles Times, Gwen Appears, August 14, 1925, Page A9.
- The Los Angeles Times, Another Discovery, August 30, 1925, Page D18.
- The Los Angeles Times, Quartet of Beauties Who Will Vie for Eastern Star Cup, Page B2.
- The Los Angeles Times, Film Displays Fashions, October 20, 1925, Page A11.
- The Los Angeles Times, Actress Sued On Clothes Account, May 24, 1932, Page A8.
