= Upstage (film) =

1926 film by Monta Bell

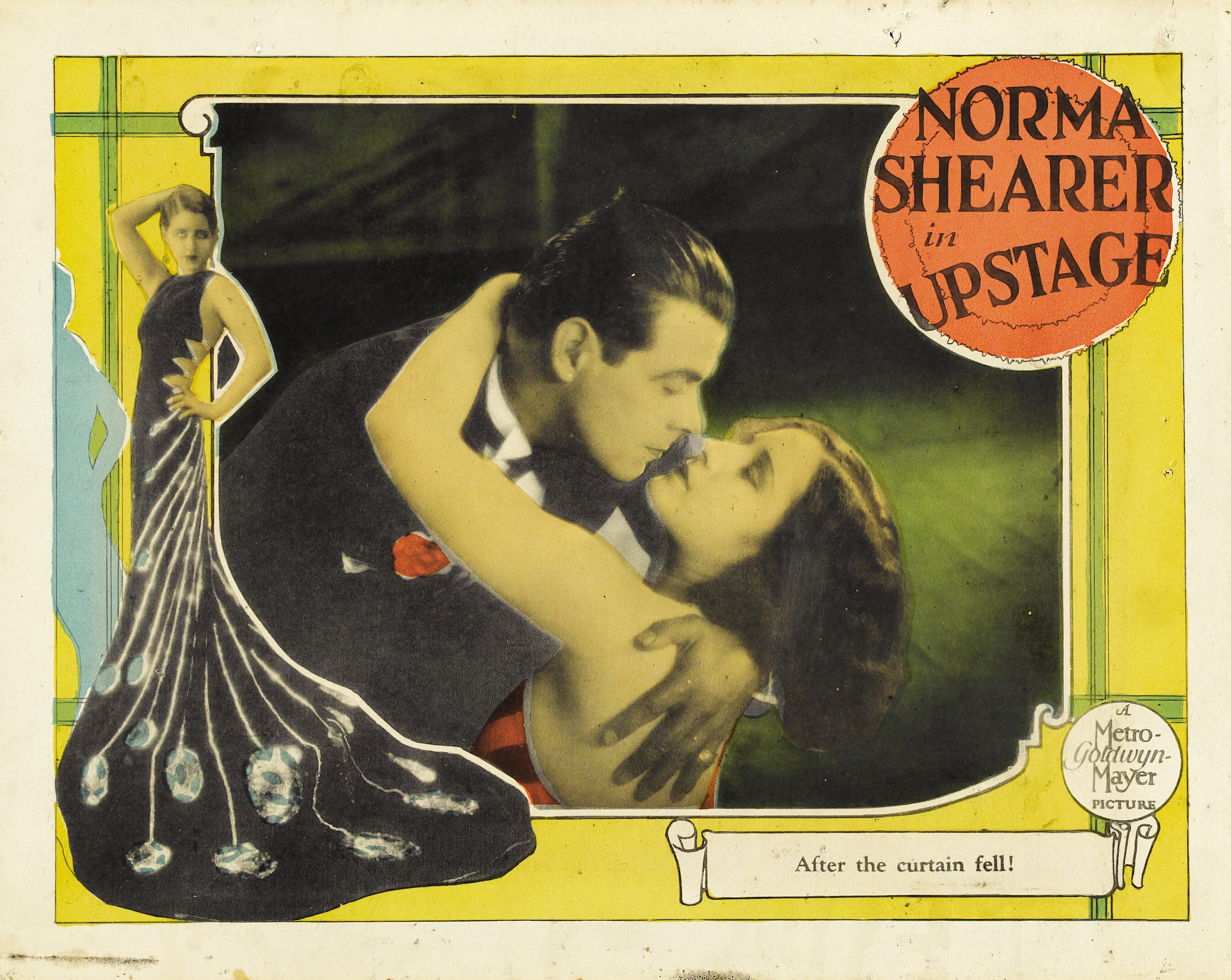
- Directed by: Monta Bell
- Written by: Lorna Moon (scenario); Joe Farnham (titles)
- Story by: Walter DeLeon
- Starring: Norma Shearer; Oscar Shaw
- Cinematography: Gaetano Gaudio
- Edited by: Frank Sullivan
- Distributed by: Metro-Goldwyn-Mayer
- Release date: November 7, 1926
- Running time: 76 minutes
- Country: United States
- Languages: Silent; English intertitles

Upstage (also known as The Mask of Comedy) is a 1926 American silent romantic drama film directed by Monta Bell, starring Norma Shearer and New York musical comedy star Oscar Shaw.

== Plot ==
Dolly is a stagestruck girl whose career has begun to wane until she displays show-must-go-on courage by standing-in as target in a knife-throwing act.

== Cast ==
- Norma Shearer - Dolly Haven
- Oscar Shaw - Johnny Storm
- Tenen Holtz - Sam Davis
- Gwen Lee - Dixie Mason
- Dorothy Phillips - Miss Weaver
- J. Frank Glendon - Mr. Weston
- Ward Crane - Wallace King
- Charles Meakin - Stage Manager
- John T. Bambury - Midget (uncredited)

== Censorship ==
Before Upstage could be exhibited in Kansas, the Kansas Board of Review required the elimination of the "bottle episode" and drinking out of bottle behind a curtain.

== Preservation status ==
A print of the film has been preserved by MGM.
