= The Great White Way (1924 film) =

American silent comedy film by E. Mason Hopper

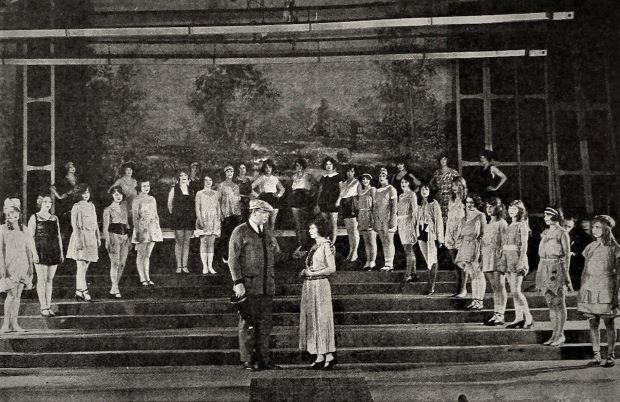
- Still showing a rehearsal with Ned Wayburn and Anita Stewart
- Directed by: E. Mason Hopper; E. J. Babille (assistant)
- Written by: Luther Reed (adaptation); L. Dayle (scenario); Old Master Studio (intertitles)
- Based on: "Cain and Mabel" by Harry Charles Witwer
- Produced by: William Randolph Hearst
- Starring: Anita Stewart; Oscar Shaw
- Cinematography: Henry Cronjager; Harold Wenstrom
- Edited by: Walter Futter
- Distributed by: Goldwyn Pictures
- Release date: January 3, 1924
- Running time: 10 reels
- Country: United States
- Language: Silent (English intertitles)

The Great White Way is a 1924 American silent comedy film centered on the sport of boxing. It was directed by E. Mason Hopper and produced by Cosmopolitan Productions and distributed through Goldwyn Pictures. The film was made with the cooperation of the New York City Fire Department. The film stars Oscar Shaw and Anita Stewart. It was remade twelve years later as Cain and Mabel with Marion Davies and Clark Gable.

== Plot ==
As described in a film magazine review, ambitious press agent Jack Murray introduces two of his clients, Follies dancer Mabel Vandegrift and prize fighter Joe Cain, to each other and they fall in love. After Brock Morton, the owner of the show, says that he will bring down the curtain on the show in the middle of opening night unless Mabel renounces Joe, the latter goes on the stage and announces that, in spite of his prior refusal, that he will fight the English boxing champion. With the money he gets from boxing promoter Tex Rickard, he buys out Morton and the show goes on. Prior to the fight, Morton dopes Joe, but he is brought around so that he is able to fight and eventually wins the match. Joe's father comes east and then brings Joe and Mabel back west with him.

== Cast ==
- Anita Stewart as Mabel Vandegrift
- Tom Lewis as Duke Sullivan
- T. Roy Barnes as Jack Murray
- Oscar Shaw as Joe Cain
- Dore Davidson as Adolph Blum
- Harry Watson as City Editor
- Hal Forde as Brock Morton
- Olin Howland as Stubbs
- Pete Hartley as English Boxing champion
- Stanley Forde as Joe's father
- Jimmy Stone as Pete Hartley
- Johnny Gallagher as Referee
- Johnny Hennessey as Cain's Second
- Frank Wunderlee as McIntyre
- Joe Humphries as Announcer
- Jerry Peterson as Smoke

unbilled

- Arthur "Bugs" Baer as himself
- Nell Brinkley as herself
- Arthur Brisbane as himself
- Kid Broad as himself
- Irvin S. Cobb as himself
- Hal Coffman as himself
- Billy De Beck as himself
- Frank DeVernon as ?
- Harry Hershfield as himself
- Fay King as herself
- Winsor McCay as himself
- J. W. McGurk as himself
- George McManus as himself
- Tex Rickard as himself
- Damon Runyon as himself
- Earl Sande as himself
- Ned Wayburn as himself
- H. C. Witwer as himself

== Preservation ==
With no prints of The Great White Way located in any film archives, it is a lost film.
