= Oscar Shaw =

American actor and singer (1887–1967)

Oscar Shaw

Oscar Shaw (born Oscar Schwartz; October 11, 1887 – March 6, 1967) was an American stage and screen actor and singer, best known for his role as Bob Adams in the first film starring the Marx Brothers, The Cocoanuts (1929).

He was born in Philadelphia, Pennsylvania. United States census records show that Shaw was already working as a stage actor in 1910, while still living with his mother, brother, and stepfather.

In 1913, Shaw married Mary Louise Givler (a native of Carlisle, Pennsylvania), in England, where they both appeared in a show called the "First American Ragtime Review" at the London Opera House. The couple lived in the Village of Great Neck Estates until 1937, when they moved to the Thomaston section of Great Neck, first in a private home. They later lived in an apartment building on Welwyn Road. Mary Shaw died on March 31, 1964 at the age of 77.

Shaw sold his home on 9 Myrtle Drive in March 1937, two months after he had settled a lawsuit with an actress, Florence Roberts (stage name: Etna Ross), who brought a $50,000 lawsuit against Shaw, alleging that he had thrown her down a staircase while the two worked together in a road company. It is not known whether the sale of his home was related to the settlement of the lawsuit.

Shaw died on March 6, 1967, in Little Neck, Queens, New York, at age 79. He is buried in Evergreen Cemetery in Gettysburg, Pennsylvania.

== Timeline ==
Here is a brief chronology of some of Shaw's shows and movies:

- In 1915, he appeared as Dick Rivers in the Princess Theatre Show Very Good, Eddie, with music by Jerome Kern and libretto by Guy Bolton.
- In 1917, he appeared in the Jerome Kern musical Leave It to Jane, by Kern and Bolton, with lyrics by P. G. Wodehouse.
- In 1919, he appeared as Tommy Tilford in The Rose of China with lyrics by P. G. Wodehouse.
- In 1920, he was Bradford Adams in the Victor Jacobi musical The Half Moon.
- In 1921, he appeared in three shows: Ziegfeld 9 O'Clock Frolic, as Robert Barker in the Vincent Youmans and Arthur Francis (Ira Gershwin) musical comedy Two Little Girls in Blue, and as Billy van Courtland in the 1921 Kern musical Good Morning, Dearie.
- In 1923, he appeared as Bastien in the play with music One Kiss.
- In 1924, he appeared in two shows: as Laddie Munn in Dear Sir and in The Music Box Revue, with book, music, and lyrics by Irving Berlin. As a duet with Grace Moore, he sang the famous Berlin song "All Alone", which was not written for the revue but interpolated into the show. The same year he appeared in the film The Great White Way.
- In 1925, he was in the film The King on Main Street with Adolphe Menjou.
- In 1926, he appeared in two films, Going Crooked and Upstage, and also originated the role of Jimmy Winter in the Guy Bolton, P. G. Wodehouse, George Gershwin and Ira Gershwin musical, Oh, Kay! with Gertrude Lawrence and Victor Moore.
- In 1927, he appeared as Gerald Brooks in The Five O'Clock Girl, with Mary Eaton; and in 1929, he starred as Bob Adams in the film version of the Marx Brothers’ musical The Cocoanuts, again with Mary Eaton. Together they sang the Irving Berlin song "When My Dreams Come True".
- In 1930, he starred as Todd Addison in the last De Sylva, Brown and Henderson musical, Flying High, with Bert Lahr, in which he sang "Thank Your Father" and "Happy Landing".
- In 1931, he appeared in the National Company of the Gershwin musical Of Thee I Sing and as Steve Merrick in Everybody's Welcome.
- In 1935, he appeared as Duke Bradford in the comedy A Lady Detained, which ran for only 13 performances.
- In 1936, he was in the comedy A Private Affair, which ran for 28 performances.
- In 1940, he appeared as Charlie Goodrich in the Victor Young film Rhythm on the River, with Bing Crosby, Mary Martin, Basil Rathbone, and Oscar Levant.
- In 1941, he appeared as Monte Trenton, Jr., in the play Pie in the Sky, which ran for only 6 performances.

== Filmography ==
Year	Title	Role	Notes
1924	The Great White Way	Joe Cain	
1925	The King on Main Street	John D: Rockland	
1926	Upstage	Johnny Storm	
1926	Going Crooked	Banning	
1929	The Cocoanuts	Robert "Bob" Adams	
1929	Marianne	Stagg	
1940	Rhythm on the River	Charlie Goodrich	(final film role)
