= Too Much Wife =

1922 film by Thomas N. Heffron

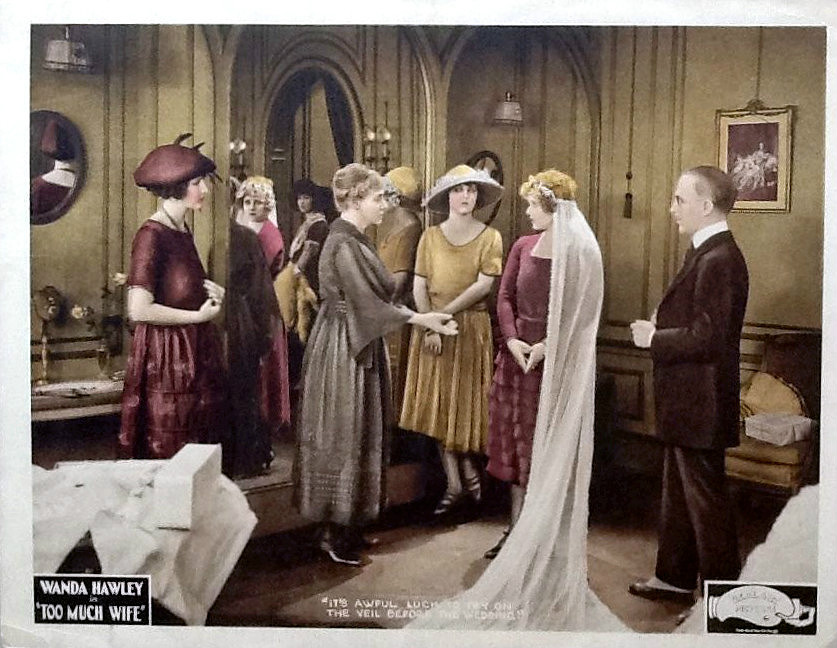
- Lobby card
- Directed by: Thomas N. Heffron
- Screenplay by: Percy Heath; Lorna Moon
- Produced by: Elmer Blaney Harris
- Starring: Wanda Hawley; T. Roy Barnes; Arthur Hoyt; Lillian Langdon
- Cinematography: William E. Collins
- Production company: Realart Pictures Corporation
- Distributed by: Paramount Pictures
- Release date: January 1, 1922
- Running time: 50 minutes
- Country: United States
- Language: Silent (English intertitles)

Too Much Wife is a lost 1922 American silent comedy film directed by Thomas N. Heffron, written by Percy Heath and Lorna Moon, and starring Wanda Hawley, T. Roy Barnes, Arthur Hoyt, Lillian Langdon, Leigh Wyant, Willard Louis, and Bertram Johns. It was released on January 1, 1922, by Paramount Pictures.

== Plot ==
As described in a film magazine, Myra marries Jack Morgan, a dealer in hides. He has a love-sick stenographer who is fond of holding hands. Myra overhears her sobbing as she talks to her husband, so she forthwith discharges her. She becomes Jack's assistant in everything from business to golf until he becomes bored. He sends himself a fake telegram so he can get away on a fishing trip, and while fishing his boat capsizes and he is reported lost. He swims to an island where he runs into his former stenographer. She uses "cave man" methods on him and calls him a "jellyfish." His wife and party arrive off shore to strew flowers on his watery grave and discover him on the island. A reconciliation follows and Jack and Myra escape on the motor boat, leaving her mother behind.

== Cast ==
- Wanda Hawley as Myra Morgan
- T. Roy Barnes as Jack Morgan
- Arthur Hoyt as John Coningsby
- Lillian Langdon as Mrs. Coningsby
- Leigh Wyant as Jane Cunningham
- Willard Louis as Tom Hare
- Bertram Johns as Jim Walker
- Johnny Fox as Office Boy
