= David Seabury =

American psychologist

David Seabury (1885 – 1 April 1960) was an American psychologist, writer, and lecturer. While practicing as a consulting psychologist in New York City, he published fifteen books.

He founded the Centralist School of Psychology, was the founder and president of the David Seabury School of Psychology, and was president of the Seabury University of Adult Education.

He also unofficially founded an unaccredited higher education institution in Los Angeles, California named Sequoia University in 1950. He served as both its President and also had an honorary PhD from Sequoia University. It officially changed its name from the College of Drugless Healing to Sequoia University on August 20, 1952, and became ratified on August 27, 1952 under Joseph Hough.

In 1923, David Seabury married feminist journalist Florence Guy Woolston.

== Bibliography ==
- Unmasking Our Minds (1924)
- Growing Into Life (1928)
- What Makes Us Seem So Queer (1934)
- How to Worry Successfully (1936)
- The Art of Selfishness (1937)
- Help Yourself to Happiness (1937)
- Build Your Own Future (1938)
- Adventures in Self-Discovery (1938)
- How to Get Things Done (with Alfred Uhler, 1938)
- Why We Love and Hate (1939)
- How Jesus Heals Our Minds Today (1941)
- High Hopes for Low Spirits (1955)
- The Art of Living Without Tension (1958)
- Stop Being Afraid! (1965)
