= Three Jumps Ahead =

1923 film directed by John Ford

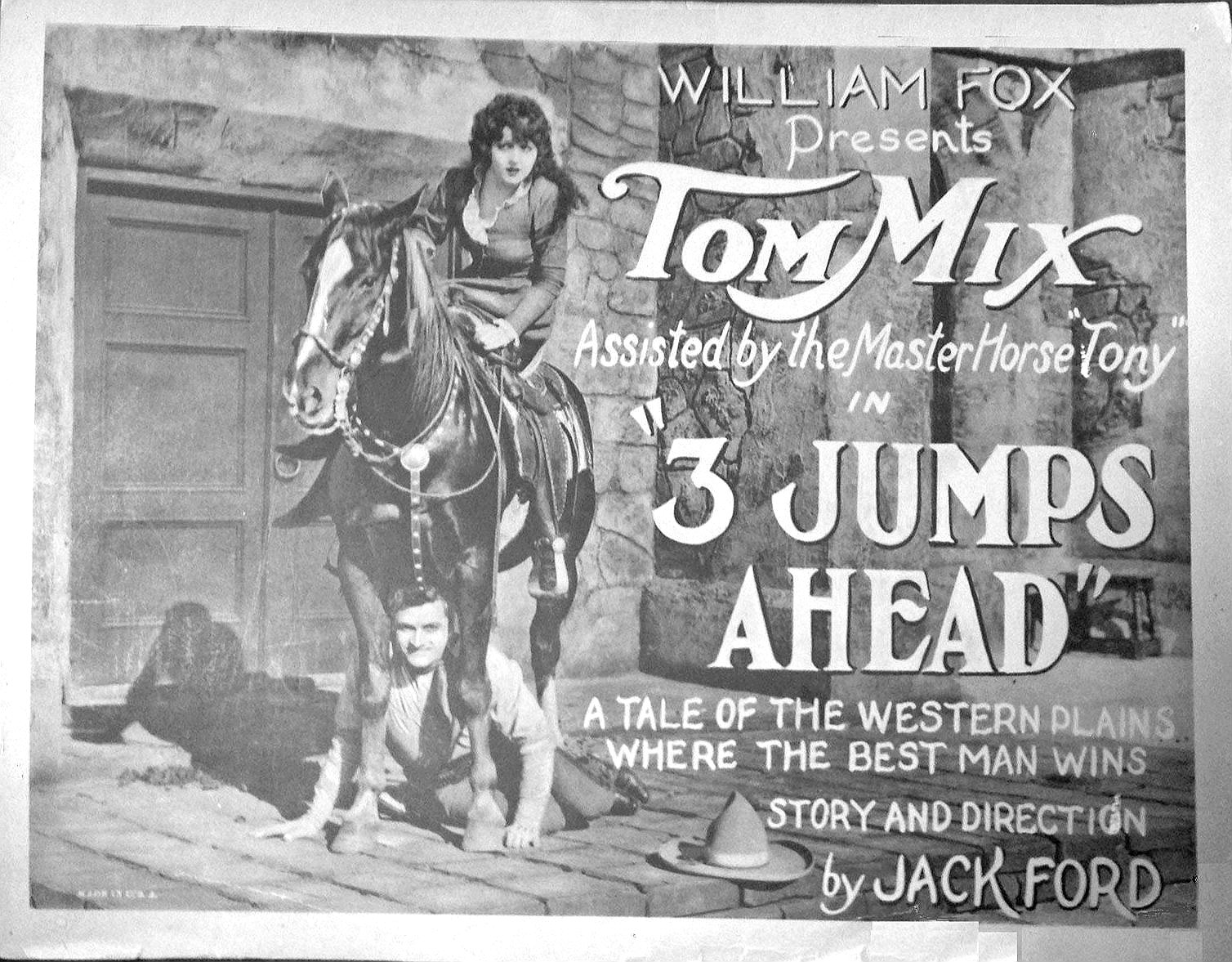
- Lobby card
- Directed by: John Ford
- Written by: John Ford
- Produced by: William Fox
- Starring: Tom Mix; Alma Bennett
- Cinematography: Daniel B. Clark
- Distributed by: Fox Film Corporation
- Release date: March 25, 1923
- Running time: 50 minutes
- Country: United States
- Languages: Silent; English intertitles

Three Jumps Ahead is a lost 1923 American silent Western film written and directed by John Ford.

== Cast ==
- Tom Mix as Steve McLean
- Alma Bennett as Annie Darrell
- Edward Peil Sr. as Buck Taggitt (as Edward Piel)
- Joseph W. Girard as John Darrell (as Joe Girard)
- Virginia True Boardman as Mrs. Darrell
- Margaret Joslin as Alicia
- Francis Ford as Ben McLean
- Harry Todd as Lige McLean
- Buster Gardner
- Tony the Horse

== Preservation ==
With no holdings located in archives, Three Jumps Ahead is considered a lost film.

== See also ==
- Tom Mix filmography
- List of lost films
