= Constance Adams DeMille =

American actress (1873–1960)

- Born: Constance Adams; April 27, 1873; Orange, New Jersey, US
- Died: July 17, 1960 (aged 87); Los Angeles, California, US
- Occupation: Actress
- Spouse: Cecil B. DeMille (m. 1902; died 1959)
- Children: 4, including Katherine DeMille (adopted) and Richard de Mille (adopted)

Constance Adams DeMille (April 27, 1873 – July 17, 1960) was an American actress and wife of filmmaker Cecil B. DeMille.

== Early life ==
Born in Orange, New Jersey, DeMille was the daughter of Judge Fredrick Adams, New Jersey Court of Errors and Appeals, and Ella Adams, his first wife. She was raised in East Orange, New Jersey. Her father married a second time, to a woman also named Ella.

== Career ==
After graduating from school, DeMille headed for the stage. She appeared briefly in Hearts are Trumps in Washington, D. C. and on Broadway, starring in The Man on the Box, from October 1905 to January 1906. She appeared in only one film, playing the part of 'Mrs. Rowland' in Where the Trail Divides (1914). In 1920 while still associated with Famous Players–Lasky, her husband formed his own new company Cecil B. DeMille Productions with his lawyer, Constance and his sister-in-law Ella King Adams who also worked as his script reader.

== Personal life ==
While performing, she met and later married Cecil Blount DeMille. They married on August 16, 1902, at her parents' home 77 Washington Street, East Orange, New Jersey. On the 5 Oktober 1908 she had her only biological child Cecilia Hoyt DeMille Harper (1908-1984). Richard DeMille was raised as their adopted son but was in fact the son of Cecil's brother William and Lorna Moon. Richard DeMille wrote about his background in the book My Secret Mother: Lorna Moon.

== Death ==
On July 17, 1960, DeMille died of pneumonia in Hollywood, aged 87. She is buried in Hollywood Memorial Park Cemetery and is remembered by a memorial banyan tree she planted in 1933 along Hilo, Hawaii's Banyan Drive.
