= The Demi-Bride =

1927 film by Robert Zigler Leonard

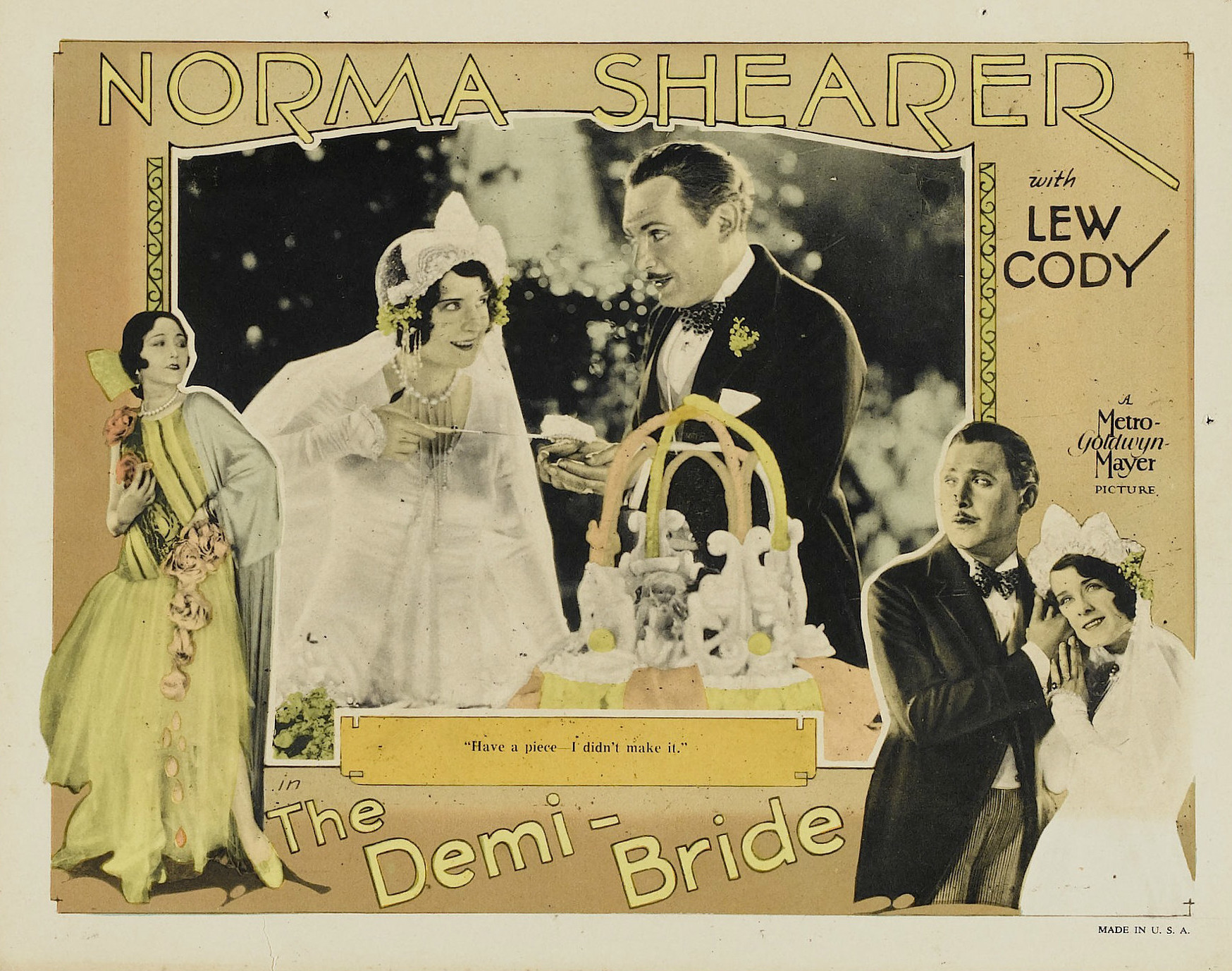
- Lobby card
- Directed by: Robert Z. Leonard
- Written by: F. Hugh Herbert; Florence Ryerson
- Starring: Norma Shearer; Lew Cody
- Cinematography: Percy Hilburn (French)
- Edited by: William Le Vanway
- Distributed by: Metro-Goldwyn-Mayer
- Release date: February 19, 1927
- Running time: 7 reels
- Country: United States
- Language: Silent (English intertitles)

The Demi-Bride is a 1927 American comedy film directed by Robert Z. Leonard, depicting the naughtiness synonymous with Paris at the time. The film is considered lost. A one minute fragment was shared by the Eye Filmmuseum.

== Plot ==
Criquette is Madame Girard's stepdaughter who blackmailed Philippe into marriage.

== Cast ==
- Norma Shearer as Criquette
- Lew Cody as Philippe Levaux
- Lionel Belmore as Monsieur Girard
- Tenen Holtz as Gaston
- Carmel Myers as Madame Girard
- Dorothy Sebastian as Lola
- Nora Cecil as School Teacher
