= Richard de Mille =

American author (1922–2009)

- Born: February 12, 1922; Monrovia, California, U.S.
- Died: April 8, 2009 (aged 87)
- Education: Columbia University; University of California, Los Angeles (BA)
- Occupations: Author, investigative journalist, psychologist
- Spouse: Margaret Belgrano (m. 1955)
- Parent(s): natural: William C. deMille, Lorna Moon adoptive: Cecil B. DeMille, Constance Adams DeMille
- Relatives: Henry C. de Mille (grandfather); Beatrice deMille (grandmother); Katherine de Mille (sister); William C. deMille (uncle); Agnes de Mille (cousin); Peggy George (cousin)

Richard de Mille (February 12, 1922 – April 8, 2009) was an American author. He was the son of screenwriters Lorna Moon and William C. deMille and the adopted son of director Cecil B. DeMille. He was briefly a member of the Scientology movement during the early 1950s and spent much of his career as an academic psychologist. He is noted for his 1976 book Castaneda's Journey, an exposé on the spiritual writer Carlos Castaneda, as well as a 1998 biography of his mother, My Secret Mother: Lorna Moon.

== Early life and education ==
He was born in Monrovia, California, to William C. deMille and the author and screenwriter Lorna Moon, when William C. was still married to his first wife, Anna George de Mille. His uncle, Cecil B. DeMille, adopted and raised Richard, not telling him of his true parentage until the death of William DeMille when Richard was 33 years old.

He first enrolled at Columbia University with the class of 1944, later transferring to the University of California, Los Angeles before graduating.

== Writing career ==
He served with the United States Army Air Corps from 1943 to 1946. That year, he became a writer and director at KTLA, remaining in that position through 1950. Around this time he joined the movement that was to become Scientology leaving KTLA to become an editorial/personal assistant to founder L. Ron Hubbard. De Mille used the nom de plume "D. Folgere" (the Old English pronunciation of "follower") when editing and/or ghost-writing during that time, despite Hubbard's protests that it would appear "Dick de Mille wasn't a true believer". He was attracted to Hubbard because, as he later said, "I thought he was a great man who had made a great discovery, and whatever his shortcomings they must be discounted because he had the answer." On February 24, 1951, De Mille assisted Hubbard in kidnapping the latter's wife, Sara, from her apartment in Los Angeles in an unsuccessful bid to have her declared insane by a psychiatrist. They eventually released her in Yuma, Arizona. The two men had already taken Hubbard's daughter Alexis and a few days later flew together with Alexis to Havana, Cuba. In 1953, he was an associate professor at Sequoia University and taught at the Department of Scientology. It was during this time that he wrote "Introduction to Scientology" published by the Scientology Council, at the time an affiliate of Sequoia University. By 1954, however, he had become disillusioned with Scientology and left the organization, explaining that he "didn't like all the contradictions and I was becoming more and more sceptical of the whole thing".

In 1955, he completed his B.A. degree at Pepperdine University and married Margaret Belgrano. He went on to get a Ph.D. from the University of Southern California in 1961. He remained with that institution as a research psychologist until 1962, when he became a lecturer in psychology at the University of California, Santa Barbara. In 1965, he left that position, and became editorial director of the Brooks Foundation the following year. He stayed there until 1967, becoming a research psychologist at the General Research Corp. in 1968, where he remained through to 1973.

He also wrote a biography of his birth mother, screenwriter Lorna Moon entitled My Secret Mother: Lorna Moon. Fellow writer Carol Easton (author of No Intermission: The Life of Agnes de Mille) remarked: "None of Richard de Mille's extraordinary relatives, not even the legendary Cecil B. de Mille himself, could have invented this riveting true story of celebrity, passion, betrayal, and tragedy".

=== Writings on Carlos Castaneda ===
De Mille wrote Castaneda's Journey: The Power and the Allegory in 1976, a book describing the detective work through which he said that Carlos Castaneda was a hoaxer and plagiarist and that don Juan is fictional. He edited a second book on the same subject, The Don Juan Papers in 1980, when he found that his exposé did not lead Castaneda's most ardent followers to fall away. This book contains documents representing views of Castaneda across the spectrum.

== Works ==
- Introduction to Scientology, Scientology Council, 1953.
- Children's Imagination Games, Dunbar Guidance Center, 1955.
- Put Your Mother on the Ceiling: Children's Imagination Games, Walker & Co., 1967, revised edition, Viking, 1973.
- (with R. P. Barthol) Project ECHO, Management Information Services, 1969.
- Two Qualms and a Quark, Capra, 1973.
- (as B. Grayer Dimrecken) A Skeleton Key to "The Transuxors", Capra, 1973.
- Castaneda's Journey: The Power and the Allegory, Capra, 1976. ISBN 0884960676, OL 4893124M
- The Don Juan Papers: Further Castaneda Controversies, Ross-Erickson, 1980. ISBN 0534121500, OL 2197063M
- My Secret Mother: Lorna Moon, Farrar, Straus, & Giroux, 1998 ISBN 0374217572, OL 700026M
- (with Bernard Stein) Benjamin Brief, DeMille Files & Reford Folder, 2001.
