= Tenen Holtz =

American actor (1887–1971)

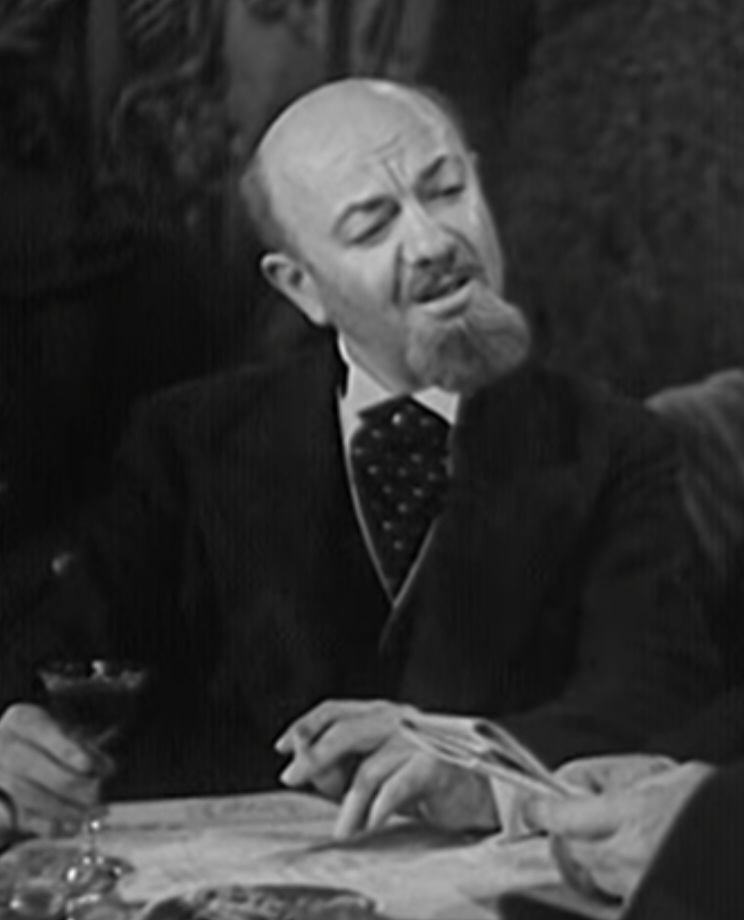
- Holtz in International Crime (1938)
- Born: Alex Elihu Tenenholtz; February 17, 1887; Russian Empire
- Died: July 1, 1971 (aged 84); Los Angeles County, California, U.S.
- Occupation: Actor
- Years active: 1926–1961
- Spouse: Ethel Fishman
- Children: 1
- Relatives: Nelson Riddle (son-in-law)

Tenen Holtz (born Alex Elihu Tenenholtz; February 17, 1887 – July 1, 1971) was an American actor. He appeared in nearly 60 films between 1926 and 1961.

== Biography ==
Holtz was born in Ozeran, Volhynia district, now in Ukraine, and came to the United States when he was seven years old. While he was in elementary school, he began working, but he pursued studies in evening high school to improve his language abilities. Jacob Pavlovich Adler observed Holtz performing in a school production and not only gave him a permanent pass to Adler's playhouse but also allowed him to attend rehearsals.

His first appearance in amateur Yiddish theatre plays occurred in 1903 in the staged readings of the works of Yiddish author Sholom Aleichem. In July 1926, he went to California "to see what all these pictures were about", he said. His film debut came in Upstage.

Holtz's final television appearance was as murder victim Otto Joseph in the 1964 Perry Mason episode, "The Case of the Arrogant Arsonist". He died in Los Angeles County, California in 1971, aged 84.

Holtz married Ethel Fishman, and they had a daughter, Naomi, who married Nelson Riddle.

== Selected filmography ==
- Upstage (1926) as Sam Davis
- Exit Smiling (1926) as Tod Powell
- Long Pants (1927) as Minor Role (uncredited)
- The Demi-Bride (1927) as Gaston
- Frisco Sally Levy (1927) as Isaac Solomon Lapidowitz
- The Trail of '98 (1928) as Mr. Bulkey
- Detectives (1928) as Orloff
- The Cardboard Lover (1928) as Argine
- Old Gray Hoss (1928) as Man with Soot on Face (uncredited)
- Bringing Up Father (1928) as Ginsberg Feitelbaum
- Noisy Noises (1929) as Man practicing with fiddle
- The Duke Steps Out (1929) as Jake, Duke's Manager
- House of Horror (1929) as Brown
- Three Live Ghosts (1929) as Crockery Man
- Lilies of the Field (1930) as Paymaster
- The Melody Man (1930) as Gustav
- The Woman Racket (1930) as Ben
- Caught Cheating (1931)
- Three Girls Lost (1931) as Photographer (uncredited)
- Faithless (1932) as Diner Proprietor (uncredited)
- Whistling in the Dark (1933) as Herman Lefkovitz
- Money Means Nothing (1934) as Mr. Silverman
- British Agent (1934) as Lenin
- Cipher Bureau (1938) as Simon Herrick
- Alfred Hitchcock Presents (1962) (Season 7 Episode 20: "The Test") as Sol Dankers
- Perry Mason (1962) Season 6, Episode 1: "The Case of the Bogus Books" as Mr. Gilfain
- The Alfred Hitchcock Hour (1963) (Season 1 Episode 32: "Death of a Cop") as Druggist
