= Love (1927 American film) =

1927 film by Edmund Goulding

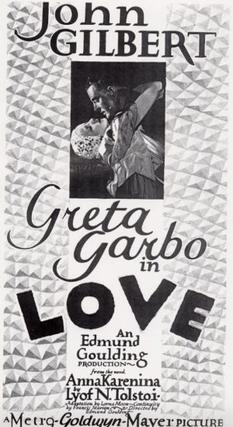
- Directed by: Edmund Goulding
- Written by: Lorna Moon; Frances Marion; Marian Ainslee; Ruth Cummings
- Based on: Anna Karenina; 1876 novel by Leo Tolstoy
- Produced by: Edmund Goulding
- Starring: John Gilbert; Greta Garbo
- Cinematography: William H. Daniels
- Edited by: Hugh Wynn
- Music by: Arnold Brostoff (1944)
- Distributed by: Metro-Goldwyn-Mayer
- Release dates: November 29, 1927 (New York City, premiere)
- Running time: 82 minutes
- Country: United States
- Languages: Silent film Sound film 1928 Release (Synchronized); English Intertitles
- Budget: $487,994.88
- Box office: $1,677,000 (worldwide rentals)

Love (full film; silent version)

Love is a 1927 American silent melodrama film directed by Edmund Goulding and released by Metro-Goldwyn-Mayer. A sound version of the film was released in 1928 with a synchronized musical score with sound effects. MGM made the film to capitalize on its winning romantic team of Greta Garbo and John Gilbert who had starred in the 1926 blockbuster Flesh and the Devil.

Taking full advantage of the star power, a drama was scripted based on Leo Tolstoy's 1877 novel, Anna Karenina. The result was a failure for the author's purists, but it provided the public with a taste of Gilbert-Garbo eroticism that would never again be matched. The publicity campaign for the film was one of the largest up to that time, and the title was changed from the original, Heat.

Director Dimitri Buchowetzki began work on Love with Garbo and Ricardo Cortez. However, producer Irving Thalberg was unhappy with the early filming, and started over by replacing Buchowetzki with Edmund Goulding, cinematographer Merritt B. Gerstad with William H. Daniels, and Cortez with Gilbert.

== Plot ==
During a blizzard, Russian count Alexis Vronsky, aide-de-camp of the Grand Duke, meets a veiled woman on the way to St. Petersburg, Russia. When they are forced to stop at an inn overnight, Vronsky attempts to seduce her but she rejects him.

Later, at a reception for Senator Karenin, Vronsky is presented to the Senator's wife, Anna, who is the woman at the inn, and asks forgiveness for his transgression. This she finally grants. She is determined to avoid him and temptation, but boredom with an older husband leads her to see Vronsky again and a relationship develops.

Anna has a young son, Sergei, with whom she has an extremely close relationship which thaws as the passion develops between Anna and Vronsky. This passion is noted by the aristocracy, to the displeasure of her husband. After a horse race, in which Anna demonstrates publicly her excessive interest in Vronsky's safety, she visits Vronsky in his rooms to see that he is all right and is cast off by her husband. Anna and Vronsky go off to Italy together.

After a while, Anna suffers because she left her son, so Vronsky takes her back to Russia. She visits her son, who had been told she was dead. Anna brings him presents on his birthday, but she is discovered by Karenin and barred from the house permanently. He tells Anna that her son will forget her, as he has done once already, and that her death would be better than the dishonor she will bring on him. He also tells her that the Grand Duke plans to cashier Vronsky from his regiment, ending a long and honourable family tradition of elite army service, because he is cohabitating with Anna. She begs the Grand Duke for mercy and succeeds in persuading him to relent on the condition that she leaves St. Petersberg and never sees Vronsky again. While he is at the dinner to which the Grand Duke has summoned him, she departs.

=== Alternate ending (European version) ===
As a result of being unable to see her son and having to leave Vronsky, she commits suicide by leaping in front of a train. This variant follows the original work of Leo Tolstoy.

=== Alternate ending (American version) ===
For three years, the lovers do not see each other but Vronsky searches frantically for Anna. By chance, he reads in a newspaper that Anna's son is at the Military Academy in St. Petersburg and visits him, learning that Karenin has died and that Anna visits her son daily. They meet and are reunited.

American exhibitors were given the choice of whether or not to use the revised "happy" ending. Theaters on the coasts mostly picked Tolstoy while theaters in Middle America mostly picked the happy ending.

== Cast ==
- John Gilbert as Captain Count Alexei Vronsky
- Greta Garbo as Anna Karenina
- George Fawcett as Grand Duke Michael
- Emily Fitzroy as Grand Duchess
- Brandon Hurst as Senator Alexei Karenin
- Philippe De Lacy as Serezha Karenin, Anna's Child
- Edward Connelly as Priest (uncredited)
- Carrie Daumery as Dowager (uncredited)
- Margaret Lee as Blonde Flirt (uncredited)
- Dorothy Sebastian as Spectator Extra at Races (uncredited)
- Jacques Tourneur as Extra (uncredited)

== Music ==
The 1928 sound version featured a theme song entitled "That Melody Of Love" which was composed by Walter Donaldson and Howard Dietz. Ernst Luz was responsible for the arrangement of the musical score for the sound version of the film.

== Release and reception ==
Love was one of MGM's highest-earning films of 1927. According to MGM records, Love earned $946,000 in theater rentals from the United States and Canada and an additional $741,000 from foreign rentals, giving the studio a profit of $571,000.
