= The Thrill Hunter (1926 film) =

1926 film

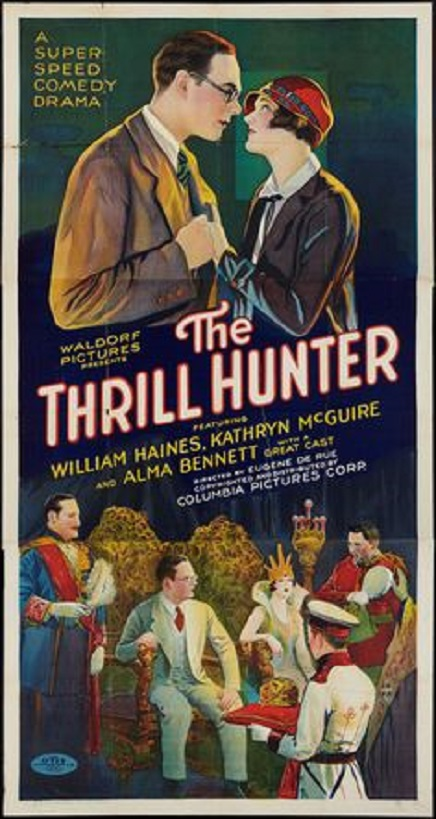
- Poster
- Directed by: Eugene De Rue
- Written by: Douglas Bronston; Janet Crothers
- Starring: William Haines; Kathryn McGuire; Alma Bennett
- Cinematography: Kenneth Gordon MacLean
- Production company: Waldorf Pictures
- Distributed by: Columbia Pictures
- Release date: February 1, 1926
- Running time: 57 minutes
- Country: United States
- Languages: Silent; English intertitles

The Thrill Hunter is a 1926 American silent comedy adventure film directed by Eugene De Rue and starring William Haines, Kathryn McGuire, and Alma Bennett. An American is mistaken for the ruler of a small European principality, and forced to marry. He manages to escape, and publishes an account of his adventures.

== Plot ==
As described in a film magazine review:

Peter Smith, writer for publisher T. B. Maynard, in love with latter's daughter Alice, is hectored by his employer because his stories lack thrills. A Maynard book, just published, Downfall of Grecovia, angers the representatives of that country. Peter meets with a slight accident which impels him to drink from a strange bottle, and forthwith he plunges head-first into a maze of wild, exciting adventures, is kidnapped by Grecovians, meets the lovely Princess Zola, escapes, and finally settles down with Alice to consider writing about his adventures.

== Cast ==
- William Haines as Peter J. Smith
- Kathryn McGuire as Alice Maynard
- Alma Bennett as Princess Zola
- E. J. Ratcliffe as T.B. Maynard
- Bobby Dunn as Ferdie
- Frankie Darro as Boy Prince

== Preservation status ==
An incomplete print of The Thrill Hunter is held at the Library of Congress archive.

== Bibliography ==
- Langman, Larry. American Film Cycles: The Silent Era. Greenwood Publishing, 1998.
