= The Dawn of a Tomorrow (1915 film) =

1915 film by James Kirkwood

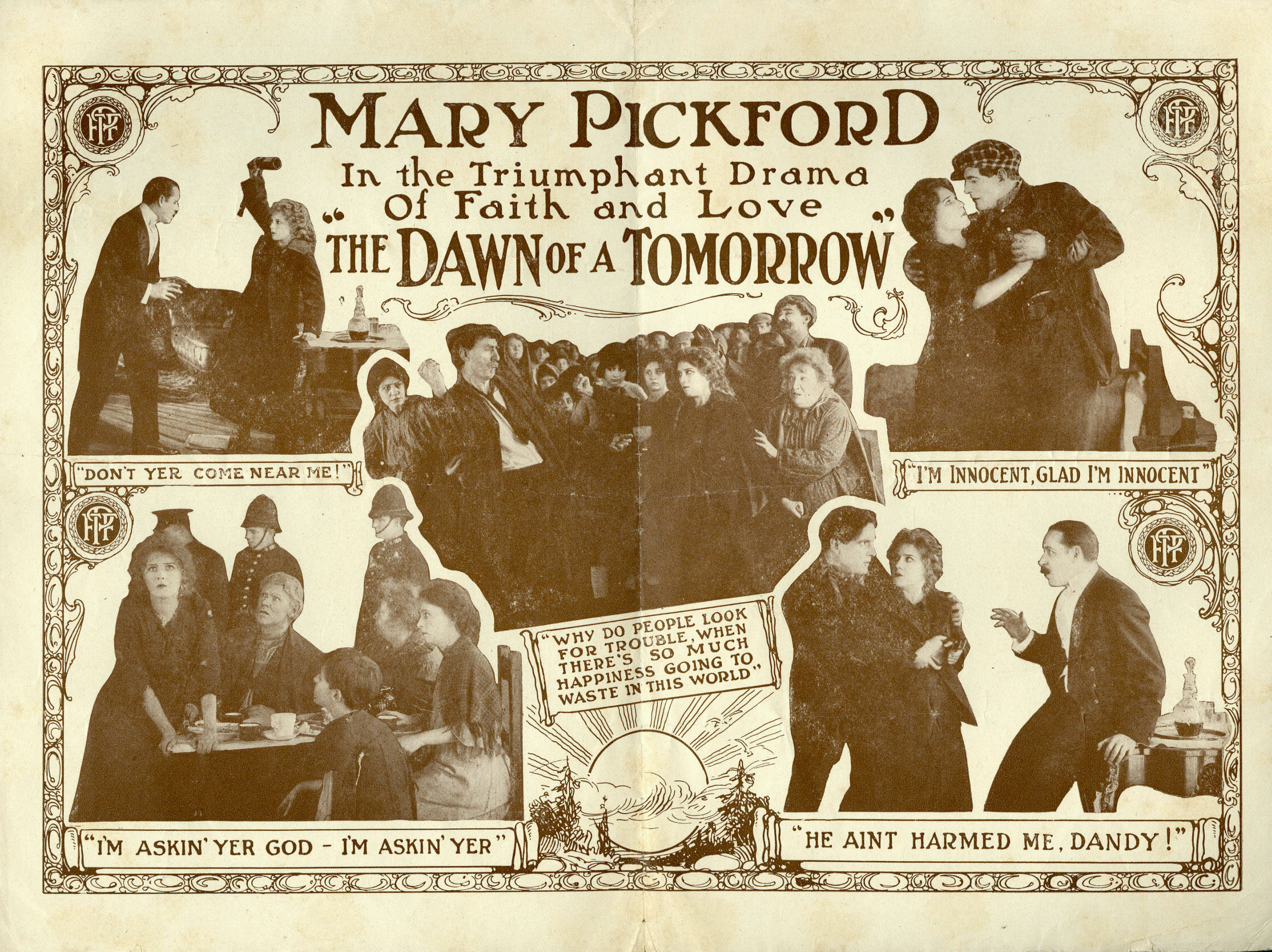
- Film pamphlet
- Directed by: James Kirkwood
- Written by: Eve Unsell (scenario)
- Based on: The Dawn of a Tomorrow by Frances Hodgson Burnett
- Produced by: Adolph Zukor; Daniel Frohman
- Starring: Mary Pickford; David Powell
- Distributed by: Paramount Pictures
- Release date: June 7, 1915
- Running time: 5 reels
- Country: United States
- Language: Silent (English intertitles)

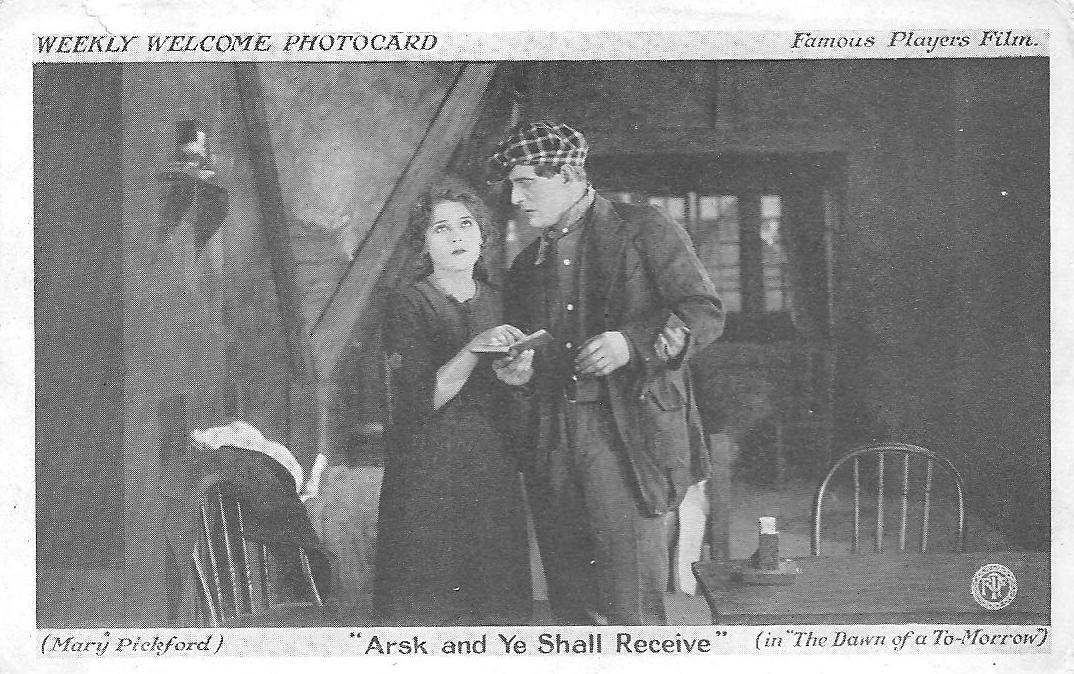
Photo card for the film.

The Dawn of a Tomorrow is a 1915 American silent drama film starring Mary Pickford, produced by Adolph Zukor's Famous Players Film Company and directed by James Kirkwood. It is based on a 1909 stage play starring Eleanor Robson Belmont, her last stage role. This film was re-released by Paramount in 1919 under their Success-Series banner and a copy survives in Sweden today. The story was remade in 1924 again as The Dawn of a Tomorrow with Jacqueline Logan in the lead.

== Plot ==
The Dawn of Tomorrow is about a young girl named Glad who becomes the inspiration for a suicidal millionaire to keep living. Glad, the selfless heroine, lives in a poor neighborhood of London. She tries to persuade her sweetheart Dandy, who is an unscrupulous thief, to give up his ways, though initially not to much avail. At the same time, the millionaire Sir Oliver Holt has been diagnosed with incurable dementia. Because of this, Holt becomes depressed to the point where he plans his suicide.

Having disguised himself as a beggar, Holt wanders into the slums, where Glad lives. They encounter each other while he is preparing to kill himself, and Glad manages to persuade him out of suicide before it is too late. Her compassion and empathy towards Holt's sufferings touches his heart and he begins to have hope in his recovery. Meanwhile, Dandy has been falsely accused of murder, and only Holt's corrupt nephew could prove his innocence. Glad, for the sake of her love for Dandy, pleads with Holt's unnamed nephew to help him. The nephew refuses, however, and tries to assault Glad. Holt then comes to her rescue and chastises his nephew. Glad and Dandy are now finally reunited and the millionaire Holt, now seeming to be renewed in mind and spirit, vows to a life of charity and is suicidal no more.

== Cast ==
- Mary Pickford as Glad
- David Powell as Dandy
- Forrest Robinson as Sir Oliver Holt
- Robert Cain as Holt's nephew
- Margaret Seddon as Polly
- Blanche Craig as Bet
- Ogden Childe

== Preservation status ==
- A print is preserved in Europe at Stockholm's Enemateket-Svenska Filminstitutet.
