= The Dawn of a Tomorrow (1924 film) =

1924 film by George Melford

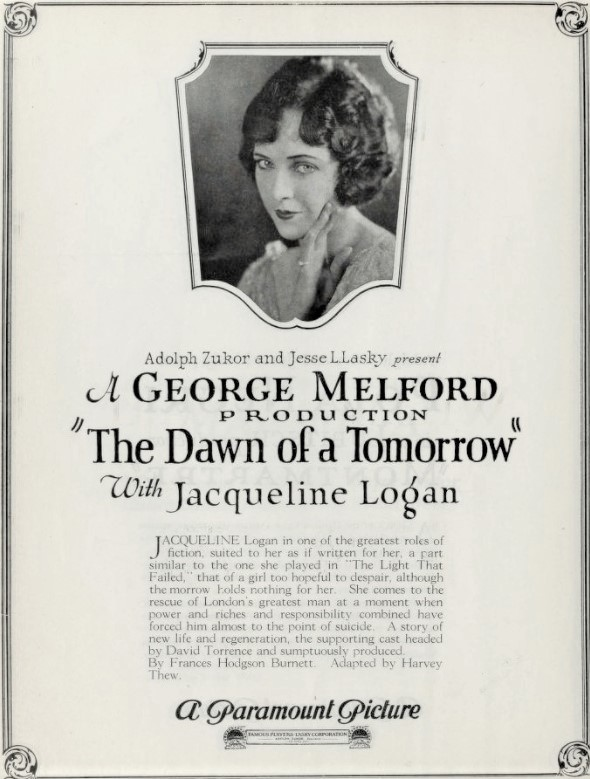
- Advertisement
- Directed by: George Melford
- Based on: The Dawn of a Tomorrow by Frances Hodgson Burnett
- Produced by: Adolph Zukor; Jesse Lasky
- Starring: Jacqueline Logan
- Cinematography: Charles G. Clarke
- Distributed by: Paramount Pictures
- Release date: April 14, 1924
- Running time: 6 reels; 6,084 feet
- Country: United States
- Language: Silent (English intertitles)

The Dawn of a Tomorrow is a 1924 American silent drama film directed by George Melford, produced by Famous Players–Lasky and distributed through Paramount Pictures, and starring Jacqueline Logan. It is based on the 1906 novel of the same name by Frances Hodgson Burnett which had been filmed before in 1915 also titled as The Dawn of a Tomorrow with Mary Pickford. A play version had been produced on Broadway in 1909 which served as the final starring stage role for Eleanor Robson Belmont.

== Plot ==
As described in a film magazine review, Sir Oliver Holt, ill and fearing a coming insanity, goes to a London slum intending to commit suicide. He is prevented from harming himself by Glad, a young woman of the slum, whose lover is a young burglar known as "The Dandy." Sir Oliver employs Dandy to obtain money from his safe, having given him the combination. Dandy performs his task, incidentally stopping Sir Oliver's nephew from looting the safe. Dandy is accused of murdering a policeman. Sir Oliver establishes Dandy's innocence and Dandy and Glad become his wards.

== Cast ==
- Jacqueline Logan as Glad
- David Torrence as Sir Oliver Holt
- Raymond Griffith as the Dandy
- Roland Bottomley as Arthur Holt
- Harris Gordon as Nod
- Guy Oliver as Black
- Tempe Pigott as Ginney
- Mabel Van Buren as Bet
- Marguerite Clayton as Madge
- Alma Bennett as Polly
- Warren Roberts as Barney
- Mickey McBan as Little Boy (uncredited)

== Preservation ==
With no copies of The Dawn of a Tomorrow located in any film archives, it is a lost film.
