= Chicago Board of Trade Building =

Skyscraper in Chicago, Illinois

- U.S. National Register of Historic Places
- U.S. National Historic Landmark
- Chicago Landmark
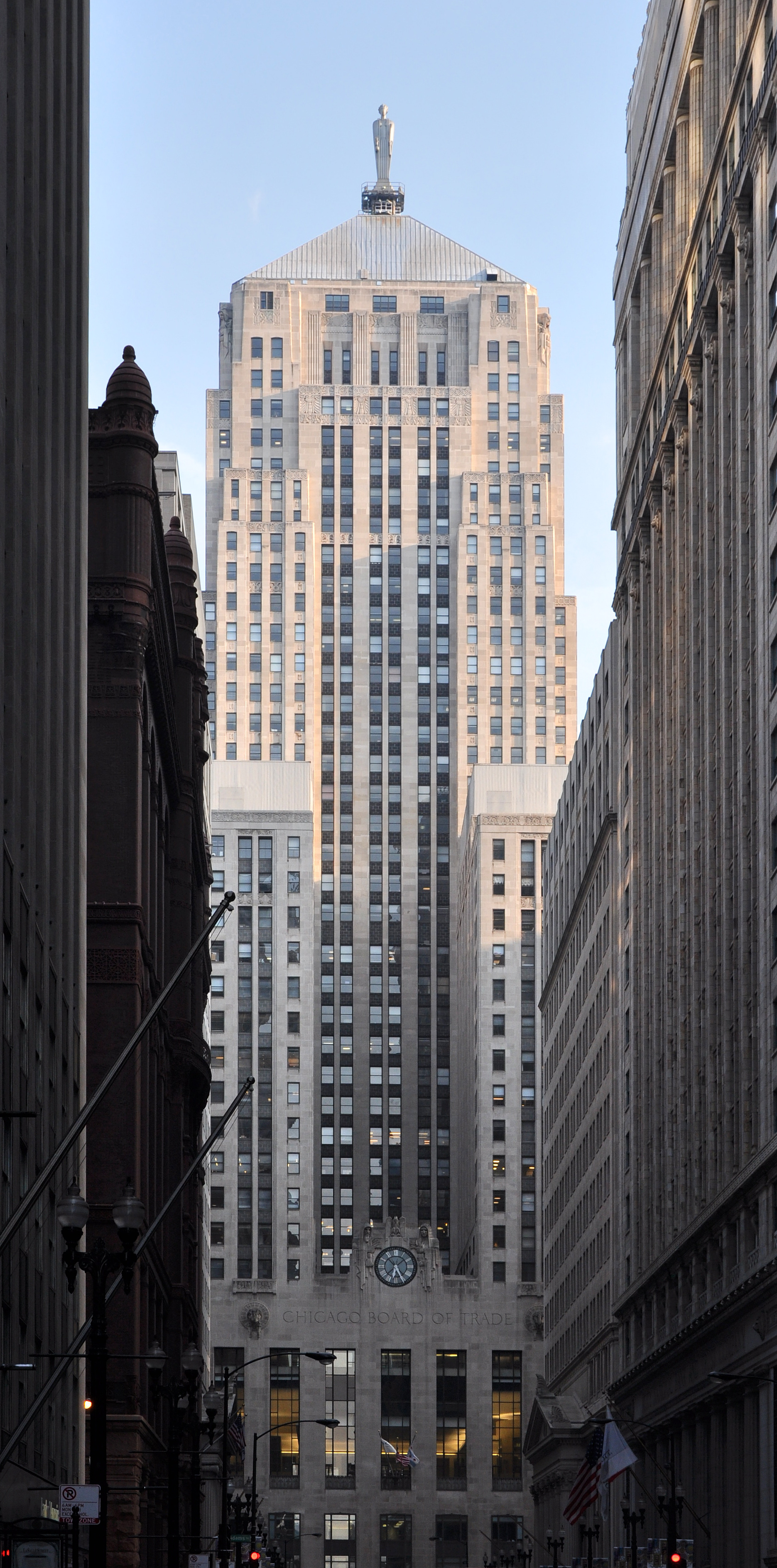
- The Chicago Board of Trade Building was Chicago's tallest from 1930 until 1965.

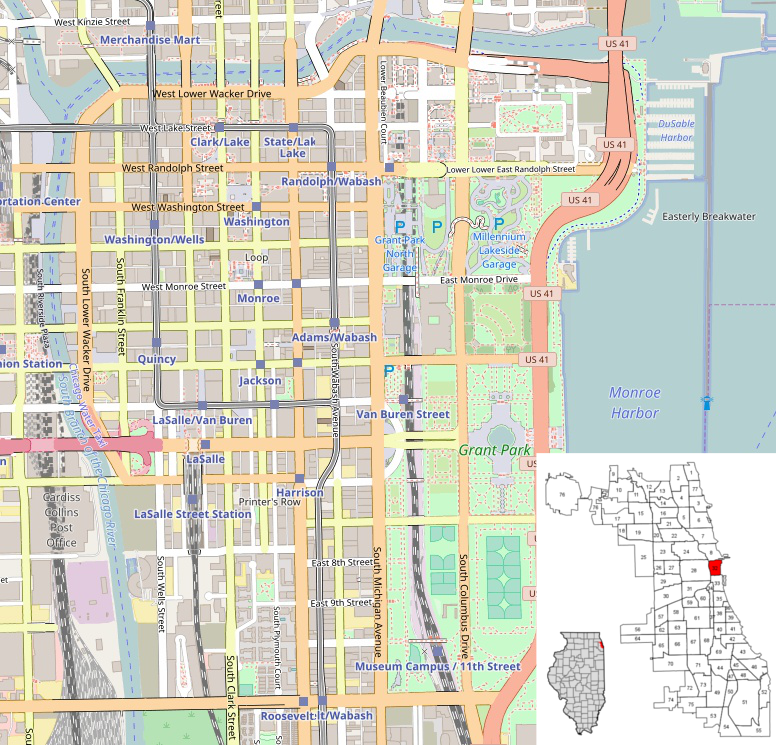
- Location within Chicago Loop
- Location: 141 W. Jackson Boulevard; Chicago, Illinois, 60604
- Coordinates: 41°52′41″N 87°37′56″W
- Built: 1930; 96 years ago
- Architect: Holabird & Root
- Architectural style: Art Deco Floor count: 44 Height: 604 feet (184 m)
- NRHP reference No.: 78003181

Significant dates
- Added to NRHP: June 16, 1978
- Designated NHL: June 2, 1978
- Designated CHICL: May 4, 1977

The Chicago Board of Trade Building is a 44-story, 604-foot (184 m) Art Deco skyscraper located in the Chicago Loop, standing at the foot of the LaSalle Street "canyon". Built in 1930 for the Chicago Board of Trade (CBOT), it has served as the primary trading venue of the CBOT and later the CME Group, formed in 2007 by the merger of the CBOT and the Chicago Mercantile Exchange. In 2012, the CME Group sold the CBOT Building to a consortium of real estate investors, including GlenStar Properties LLC and USAA Real Estate Company.

The CBOT has been located at the site since 1885. A building designed by William W. Boyington stood at the location from 1885 to 1929, being the tallest building in Chicago from its construction until its clock tower was removed in 1895. The Boyington building became unsound in the 1920s and was demolished in 1929, replaced by the current building designed by Holabird & Root. The current building was itself Chicago's tallest until 1965, when it was surpassed by the Richard J. Daley Center.

The current structure is known for its Art Deco architecture, sculptures and large-scale stone carving, as well as large commodity trading floors. An aluminum, three-story Art Deco statue of Ceres, Roman goddess of agriculture (particularly grain), caps the building. The building is a popular sightseeing attraction and location for shooting movies, and its owners and management have won awards for efforts to preserve the building and for office management. The building was listed as a Chicago Landmark in 1977 and became a National Historic Landmark and a National Register of Historic Places site in 1978.

== Early history ==
=== Early locations ===
On April 3, 1848, the Board of Trade opened for business at 101 South Water Street, in a room over the Gage and Haines Flour Store. When 122 members were added in 1856, it was moved to the corner of South Water and LaSalle Streets. After another temporary relocation west on South Water Street in 1860, the first permanent home was established within the Chamber of Commerce Building on the corner of LaSalle and Washington Streets in 1865. In 1871, the Great Chicago Fire destroyed that building. The exchange temporarily reopened two weeks after the fire in a 90 feet (27 m) wooden building known as "the Wigwam" at the intersection of Washington and Market Streets, before reclaiming its home in a new building constructed at the Chamber of Commerce site one year later.

=== 1885 building ===
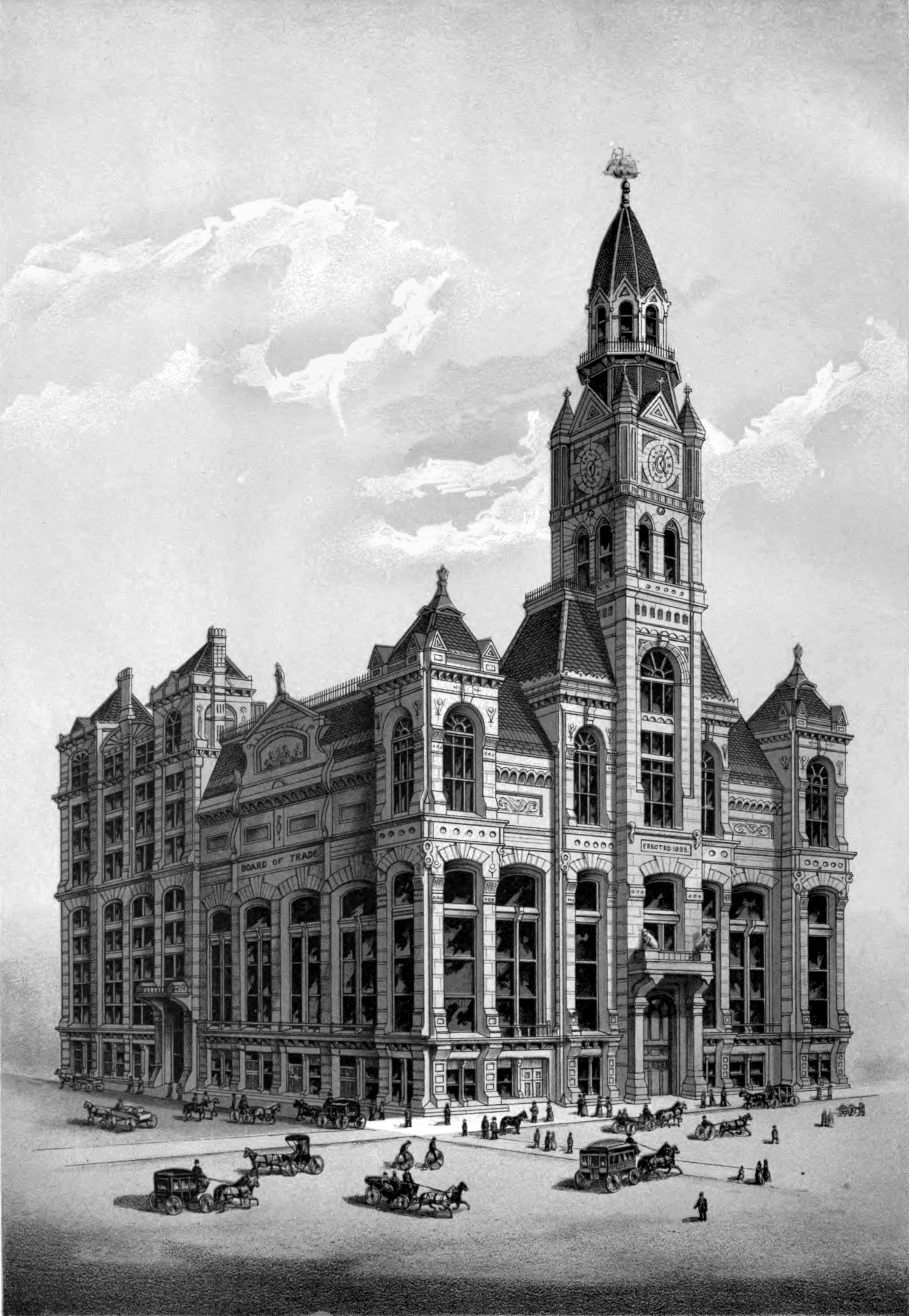
"On the evening of December 1, 1885, the tower of the new Board of Trade was illuminated by one of the most powerful lights ever devised, ... and can be seen at a distance of sixty miles". The lights were provided with power from the building's own generator.

In 1882, construction began on the CBOT's new home. The building was designed by William W. Boyington, best known today for his work on the Chicago Water Tower. It faced Jackson Street with 180 ft (55 m) of frontage and was built from structural steel and granite taken from the Fox Island quarry near Vinalhaven, Maine. With a rear of enameled brick, it was 10 stories tall and featured a tower 320 ft (98 m) tall containing a large clock and 4,500 lb (2,000 kg; 320 st) bell, topped by a 9 ft (2.7 m) copper weather vane in the shape of a ship. The interiors were finished in mahogany and frescoed. Construction cost was $1.8 million. (Note: Equivalent to $66.7 million in 2025.) With four elevators and a great hall measuring 152 ft × 161 ft × 80 ft (46 m × 49 m × 24 m), decorated by a stained-glass skylight and ornate stone balusters, it was the first commercial building in Chicago to have electric lighting. It was also the first building in the city to exceed 300 ft (91 m) in height and at the time was the tallest building in Chicago. The building's formal dedication ceremonies, which were described by a contemporary as "brilliant and imposing", took place on April 29, 1885, and were attended by over four thousand persons including dignitaries from around the world. The building was surrounded by banks such as Continental National Bank, Bank of Montreal, Corn Exchange Bank, Chicago Trust & Savings Bank, Eggleston & Son, Armour and Company, and F. G. Kammerer.

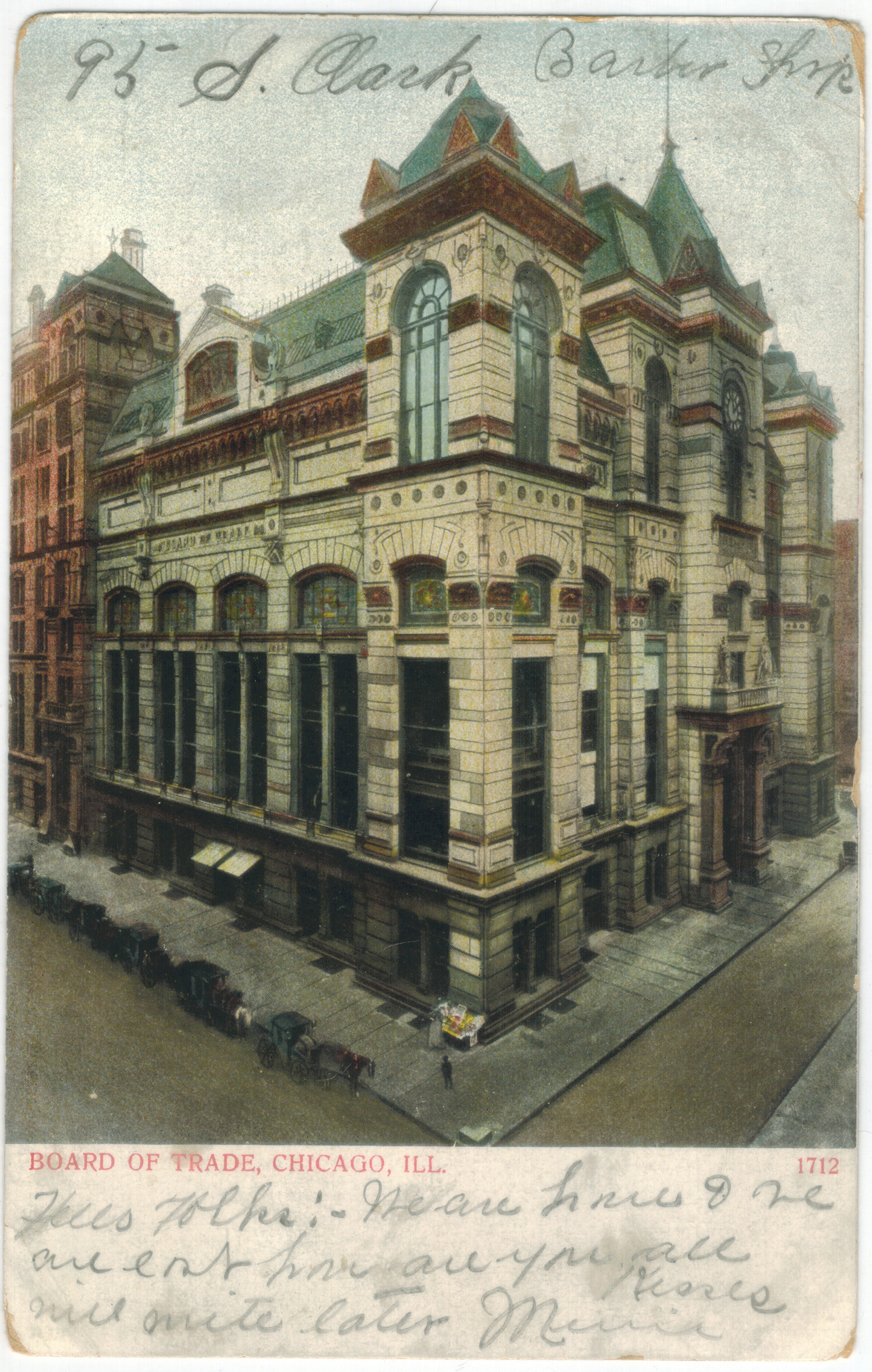
Postcard circa 1907 depicting the Board of Trade, after the clock tower had been removed

The building attracted tourists, visitors, and protesters. The inaugural banquet for the building opening was marched on by a sizable column of Chicago labor activists, under the International Working People's Association banner and led by Albert Parsons, Lucy Parsons, and Lizzie Holmes. "The building, on which two million dollars had been lavished in the midst of an economic depression, was denounced by the anarchists as ... the crowning symbol of all that was hateful in the private property system." The procession was cheered by thousands of spectators. Their access to the Board of Trade was blocked by a phalanx of police, first at Jackson Street, then at LaSalle Street, finally coming to within a half-block of the building, "bathed in a sea of electric light only recently installed for the occasion".

Viewing galleries were opened to the public for the first time in honor of the 1893 World's Columbian Exposition. Two years later, the clock tower was removed and the "tallest building in Chicago" record was then held by the 302 ft (92 m) tall Masonic Temple Building. Built on caissons surrounded by muck, the trading house was rendered structurally unsound in the 1920s when construction began across the street on the Federal Reserve Bank of Chicago. The 1885 building was subsequently demolished in 1929, and the exchange temporarily moved to Van Buren and Clark while a new building was constructed at the LaSalle and Jackson site.

The 1885 allegorical architectural sculptures of 35 ft (11 m) Industry and Agriculture, two figures of a four-piece set, were removed from the original building and now stand in a nearby pedestrian plaza.

== 1930 building ==
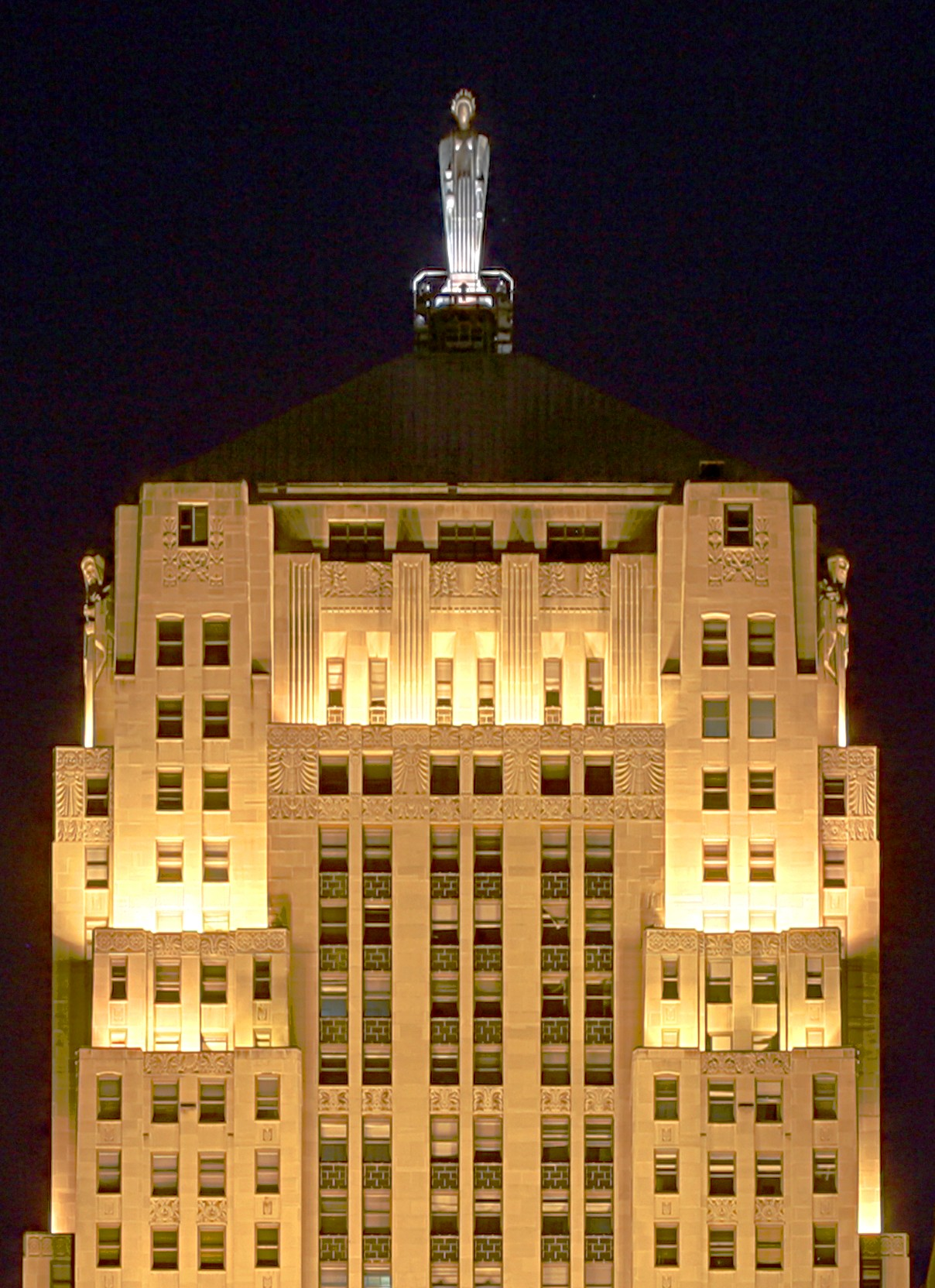
Night view of the top of The Chicago Board of Trade with the statue of Ceres clearly visible

=== Architecture ===
In 1925, the Chicago Board of Trade commissioned Holabird & Root to design the current building. The general contractors Hegeman & Harris built it for $11.3 million, (Note: Equivalent to $207 million in 2025) although the reported twenty-year mortgage value was $12 million. (Note: Equivalent to $220 million in 2025.) Clad in gray Indiana limestone, topped with a copper pyramid roof, and standing on a site running 174 ft (53 m) east–west on Jackson Boulevard and 240 ft (73 m) north–south on LaSalle Street, the 605 ft (184 m) tall art deco-styled building opened on June 9, 1930. It serves as the southern border for the skyscrapers hugging LaSalle Street and is taller than surrounding structures for several blocks. The Chicago Board of Trade has operated continuously on its fourth floor since the 1930 opening, dedicating 19,000 square feet (1,800 m^{2}) to what was then the world's largest trading floor. Built in 1930 and first designated a Chicago Landmark on May 4, 1977, the building was listed as a US National Historic Landmark on June 2, 1978. It was added to the US National Register of Historic Places on June 16, 1978.

The advent of steel frame structural systems allowed completely vertical construction; but as with many skyscrapers of the era, the exterior was designed with multiple setbacks at increasing heights, which served to allow additional light into the ever-deepening concrete "valleys" in urban cores. At night, the setbacks are upwardly lit by floodlights, further emphasizing the structure's vertical elements. The night illumination design was a common contemporary Chicago architectural theme, seen also in the Wrigley Building, the Jewelers Building, the Palmolive Building, the LaSalle-Wacker Building, and the Tribune Tower.

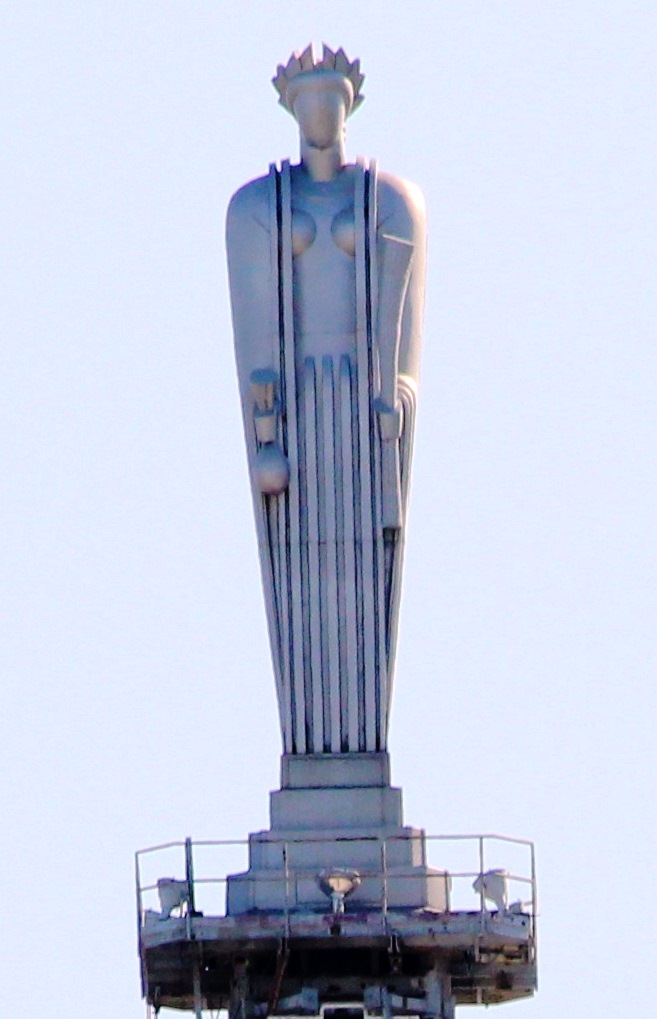
Statue of Ceres, at the top of the building

Interior decoration includes polished surfaces throughout, the use of black and white marble, prominent vertical hallway trim, and an open three-story lobby which at the time of opening housed the world's largest electric light fixture. Though One LaSalle Street had five more floors, the CBOT building was the first in Chicago to exceed a height of 600 ft (180 m). After surpassing the Chicago Temple Building, it was the tallest in Chicago until the Daley Center was completed in 1965. Known for its work on the Brooklyn Bridge, the family-operated factory of John A. Roebling supplied all of the cables used in the building's 23 Otis elevators. Beneath the main trading floor, over 2,700 miles (4,300 km) of telephone and telegraph wires were once hidden. No less than 150,000 miles (240,000 km) of wires (considered possibly the most direct long-distance wire from any building) once ran from the room. Although the building was commissioned for the Chicago Board of Trade, its first tenant was the Quaker Oats Company, which moved in on May 1, 1930.

=== Artwork ===
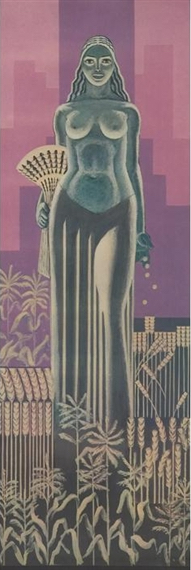
John W. Norton's three-story mural of Ceres with corn and wheat at her feet

Sculptural work by Alvin Meyer, the one-time head of Holabird & Root's sculpture department, is prominent on the building's façade, and represents the trading activities within. On each side of the 13 ft (4.0 m) diameter clock facing LaSalle Street are hooded figures, a Babylonian holding grain and a Native American holding corn. Similar figures are repeated at the uppermost corners of the central tower, just below the sloping roof. About 30 ft (9.1 m) above street level, representations of bulls protrude directly from the limestone cladding on the building's north side and to a lesser degree on the east side, a reference to a bull market.

The central structure is capped by a 6,500 pound, 31 ft (9.4 m) tall aluminum statue by sculptor John H. Storrs of the Roman goddess of grain, Ceres, holding a sheaf of wheat in the left hand and a bag of corn in the right hand, as a nod to the exchange's heritage as a commodities market. This statue was assembled from 40 pieces.

Commissioned in 1930 but removed from the agricultural trading room in 1973 and stored until 1982, John W. Norton's three-story mural of Ceres shown bare-breasted in a field of grain underwent extensive restoration in Spring Grove, Illinois, by Louis Pomerantz before being displayed in the atrium of the 1980s addition to the back of the building.

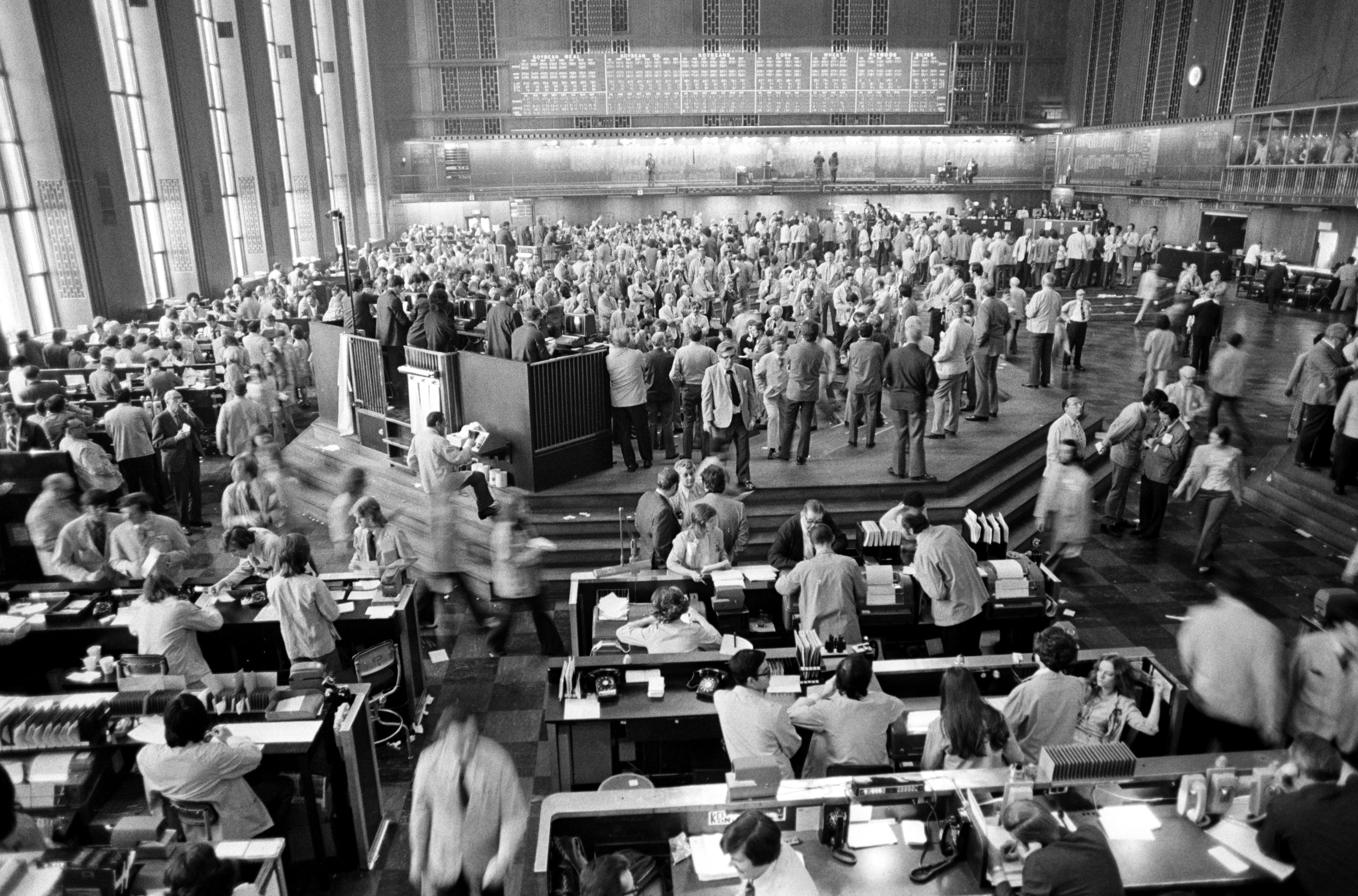
Trading floor at the Chicago Board of Trade, 1973

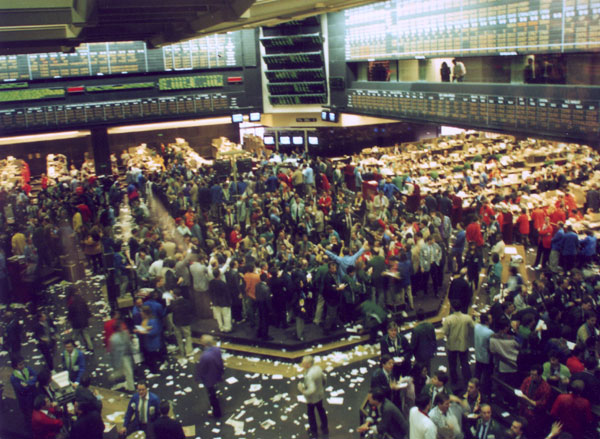
Trading floor at the Chicago Board of Trade, 1993

=== Trading floor ===
According to the June 16, 1930, issue of Time magazine, visitors carrying ripened wheat heads stared in curiosity at the six-story tall trading room directly above the lobby and behind the large windows below the clock facing LaSalle Street. At the center of the room, Time reported on the items being traded in "pits" organized based on commodities type with pits names such as the corn pit, soybean pit or wheat pit. The individual pits are raised octagonal structures where open outcry trading occurs. Steps up the outside of each octagon provide an amphitheater atmosphere, and enable a large number of traders to see each other and communicate during trading hours. With early versions dating back to 1870, this type of trading pit was patented in 1878.

The trading area is surrounded by desks allowing workers to support transactions. In the early days, the desks served as a relay point between the pits and those wishing to buy or sell. When trade orders and information began to be communicated by telegraph, Morse code operators were employed, later replaced by phone operators.

Subsequent additions to the Board of Trade Building moved the agricultural and financial trading floors out of the original trading room and into new spaces in the additions to the building's rear in the 1980s. In 2004, the historic 1930 trading floor, already substantially altered (and unused for more than two years), was demolished and its pits filled with concrete. It was renovated in a modern style and is now leased to a privately owned options trading firm.

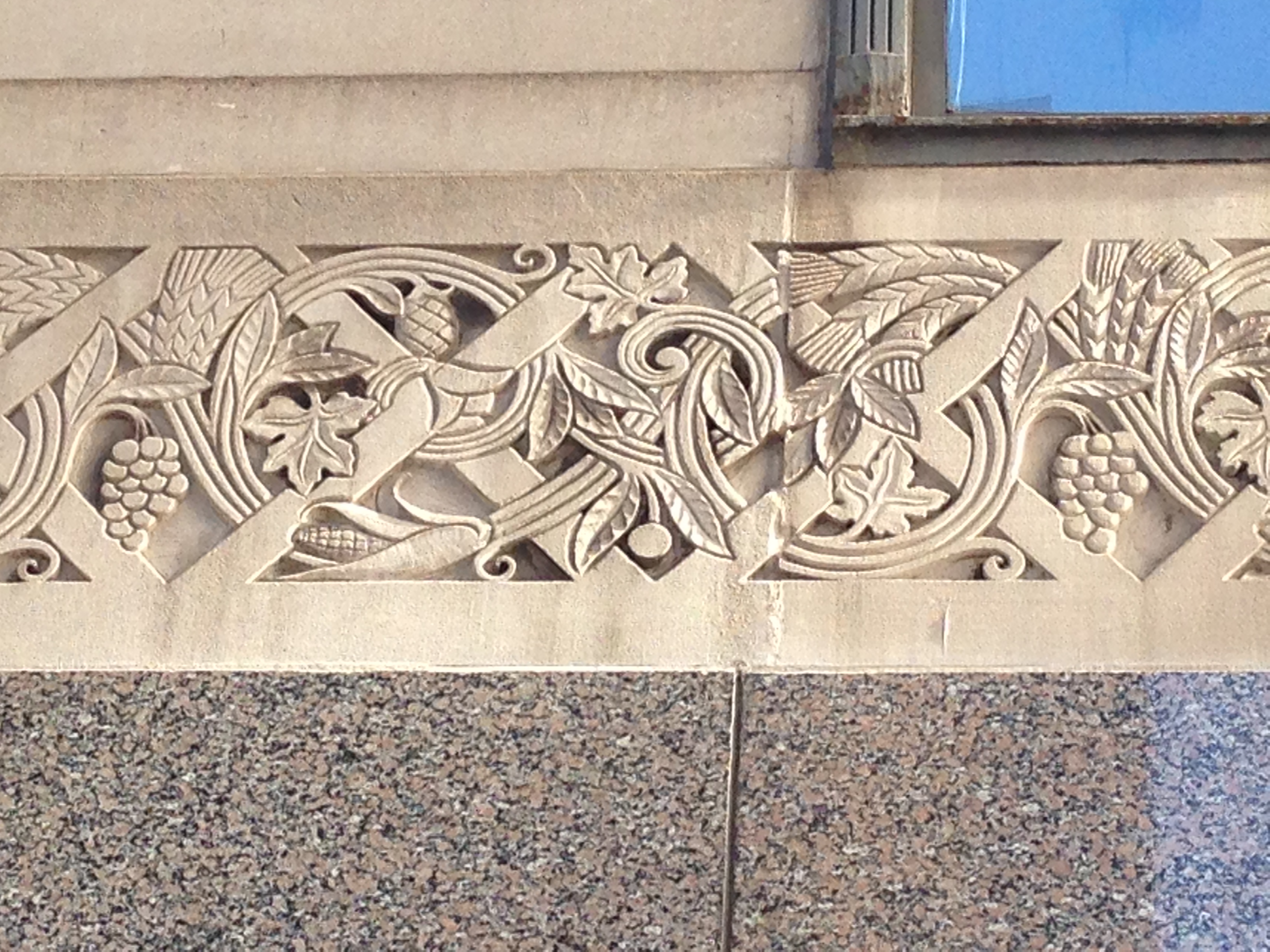
Outdoor building detail depicting crops

=== Expansion ===
In 1980, the owners added a 275 ft (84 m) 23-story expansion to the south side of the building. It was topped by an octagonal ornament shaped similarly to the terraced trading pits and was designed in a postmodern style by architect Helmut Jahn. Colored black and silver, with a sunlit atrium on the 12th floor facing the south wall of the older structure, the annex provided a four-story granite lined agricultural trading floor, then the world's largest at 32,000 square feet (2,970 m^{2}). Even as the Sydney Futures Exchange and other markets were ceasing outcry trading, Mayor Richard M. Daley led the groundbreaking on January 17, 1995, for additional expansion into a five-story building to the east designed by architects Fujikawa Johnson and structural engineers TT-CBM. When opened in 1997, the $175 million structure would add 60,000 square feet (5,570 m^{2}) of trading space and for a period again would house the world's largest trading floor. It was nicknamed the "Arboretum" by some in reference to expansion supporter CBOT Chairman Patrick H. Arbor. The expansion included price boards 600 feet (183 m) long and supported 12,000 computers, 6,000 voice devices, and 2,000 video devices requiring 27,000 miles (43,500 km) of cable.

Collectively, the trading floors now encompass approximately 115,150 square feet (10,700 m^{2}). The logo of the CBOT represents a trading pit, and appears prominently on stonework facing Clark Street and on street-level barriers at the service entrance on Van Buren Street. The addition has a twelve-story atrium and melds historical and contemporary design with art deco references such as setbacks, central tower, symmetrical projecting wings, pyramidal roof and abstract cascade and scallop lobby design. Between the original and new buildings, where there was formerly a street, a wide street-level walkway connects the plaza on LaSalle Street to Van Buren Street in what would ordinarily be the building's first floor. Passing over the Van Buren Street elevated train tracks, a green glass-enclosed steel-frame bridge connects the lower southwest corner of the 23 story addition to the Chicago Board Options Exchange (although this bridge was closed to pedestrian traffic in the wake of the September 11, 2001 attacks for security reasons).

=== Renovation and 21st century ===
In 2005, the building underwent an extensive $20 million renovation directed by Chicago architect Gunny Harboe, whose restoration work included Loop landmarks the Rookery Building and Reliance Building. The project included restoration of the main lobby to emphasize the design features of the art deco era, elevator modernization, façade renovation and cleaning, and the continued renovation of upper floor corridors and hallways. Though impractically small for modern use, mailboxes in the lobby were restored to their original condition to follow the theme of vertical lines found throughout the complex. An improved electrical infrastructure, with ten main feeds from seven different Commonwealth Edison electrical substations, was added in addition to redundant cooling systems and upgraded telecommunications capabilities.

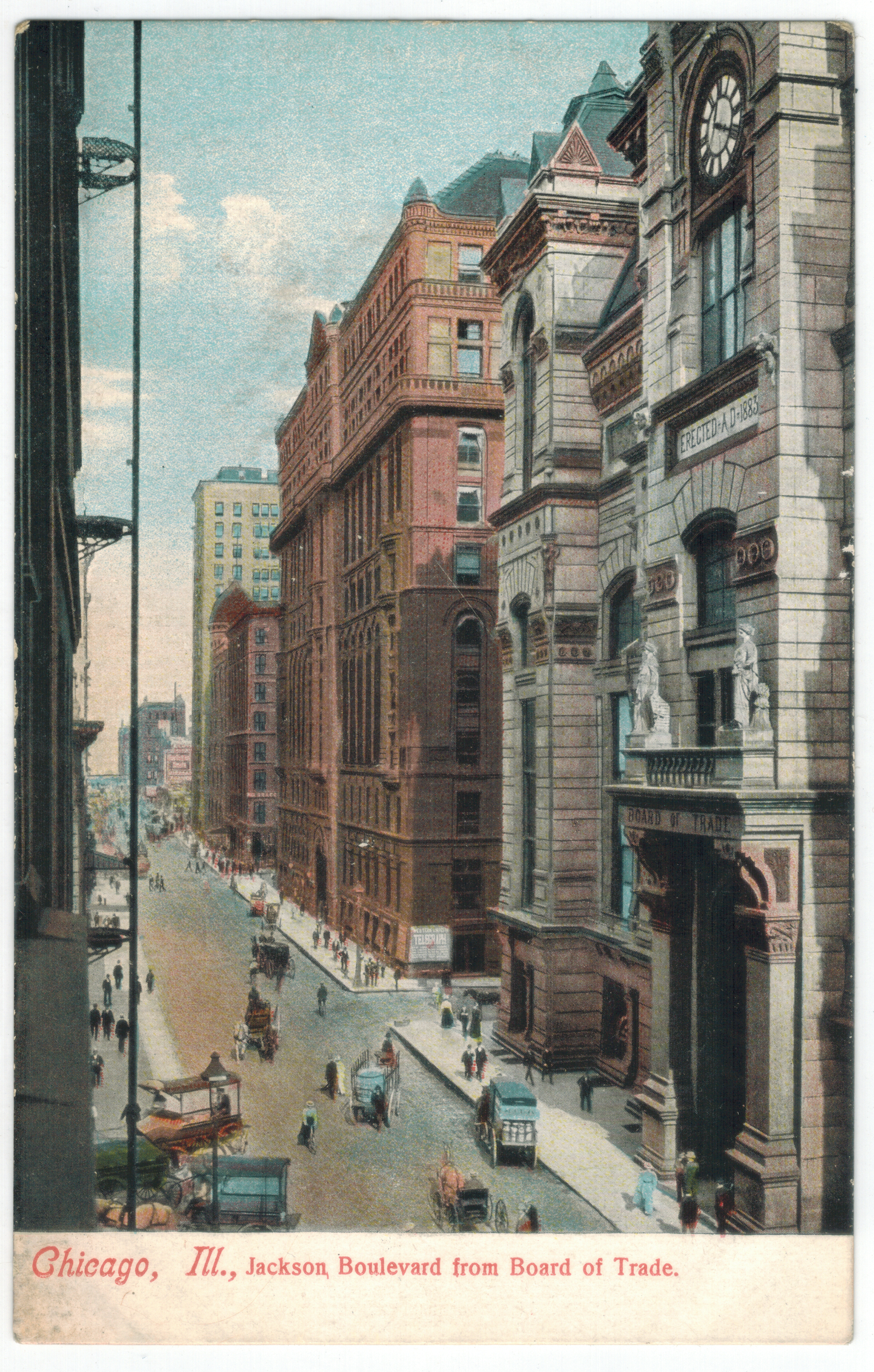
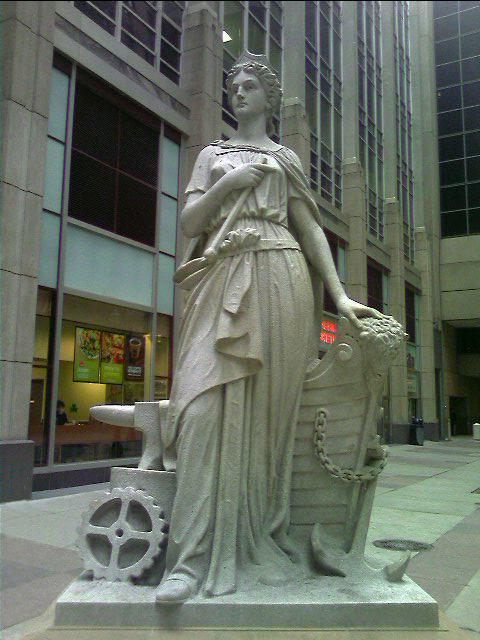
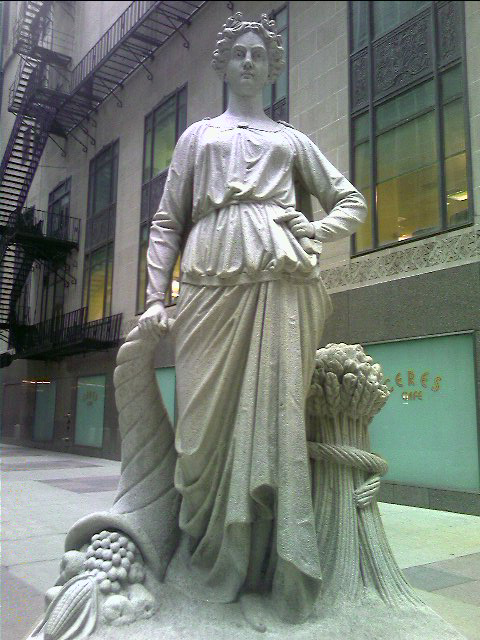
An image of the original 1883 Board of Trade building (left), in this image, two statues stand above the door depicting 'Industry' and 'Agriculture'. On the right are the Industry and Agriculture statues from the 1883 Board of Trade building on display next to the current building.

When the old CBOT building was demolished in 1929, two 4.5 short tons (4.0 long tons; 4.1 t) 12 ft (3.7 m) tall gray granite statues of classically styled goddesses were moved from the second floor ledge above the main entrance into the gardens of the 500-acre (2.0 km^{2}) estate of Arthur W. Cutten, a wheat and cotton speculator who went bankrupt during the Great Depression. One goddess represents agriculture and is shown standing with wheat and leaning on a cornucopia. The other represents industry and appears with the bow of a ship and an anvil. The statues were found in 1978 near Glen Ellyn, Illinois by the Forest Preserve District of DuPage County, on land acquired from Cutten's estate. After being displayed in a parking lot at Danada Forest Preserve for several years, both were returned to the CBOT building's plaza and rededicated on June 9, 2005.

In September 2011, the intersection of LaSalle Street and Jackson Boulevard in front of the building became the headquarters for the Occupy Chicago protest movement. On April 23, 2013, the CME Group sold the north and south towers of the building at 141 West Jackson Boulevard for $151.5 million to a joint venture between GlenStar Properties LLC and USAA Real Estate Company. The CME retained ownership of the smaller east building at 333 South LaSalle Street. CME signed a 15-year lease for the 150,000 square feet (14,000 m^{2}) it occupies in the two towers.

== Surroundings ==
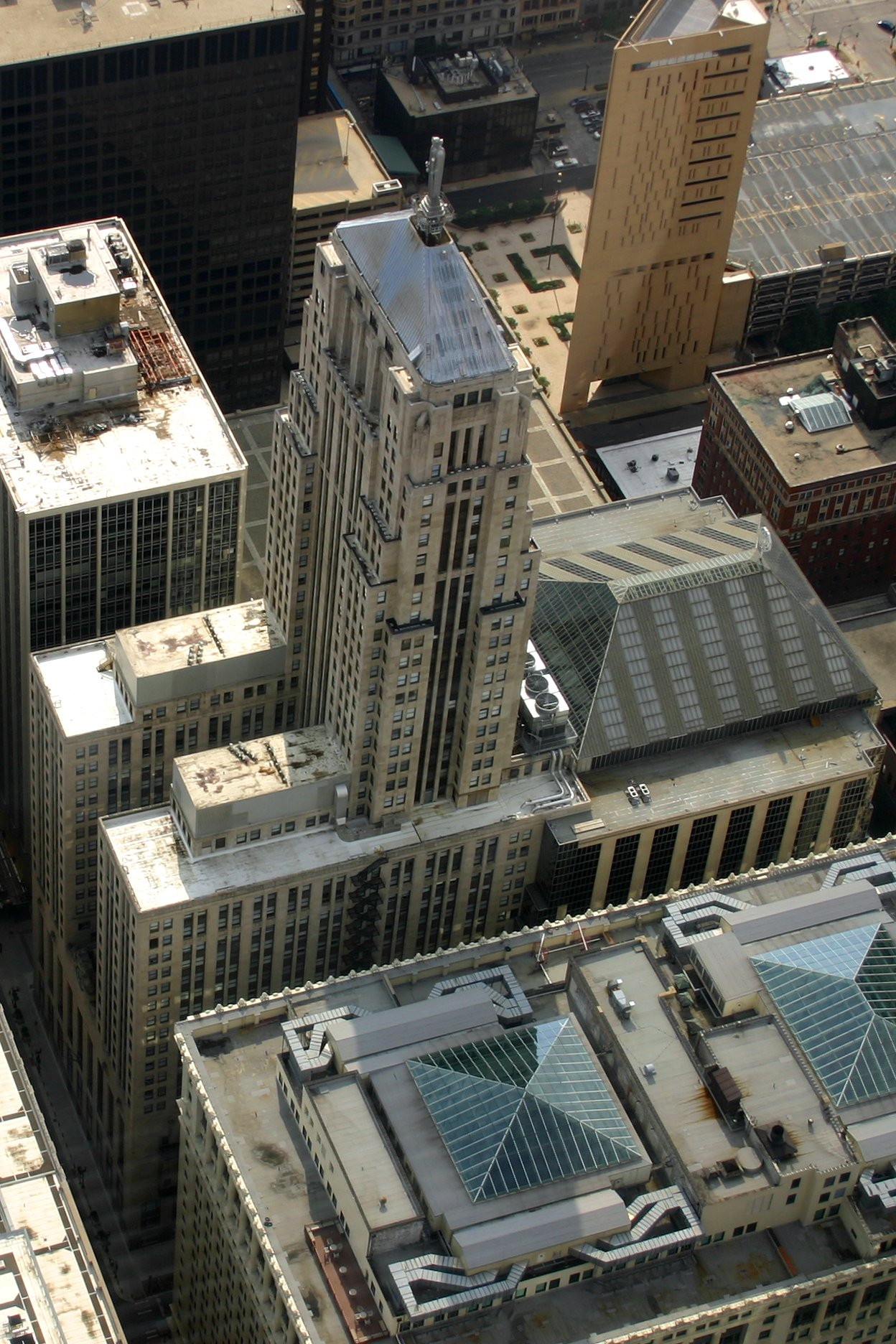
Chicago Board of Trade Building as seen from the Willis Tower

The LaSalle Street canyon is home to other historic buildings including the Rookery Building, a National Historic Landmark considered to be the oldest standing high-rise. A 1907 renovation included a lobby remodeled by Frank Lloyd Wright in the Prairie School style. The name rookery comes from the previous building on the property which became home to many birds, especially pigeons. The nearby Reliance Building was the first skyscraper to have large plate glass windows comprise the majority of its surface area, and One North LaSalle was for some time one of Chicago's tallest buildings. Both the Reliance Building and One North LaSalle are on the US National Register of Historic Places. Since 1853, the governments of Chicago and Cook County have shared three different buildings at the north end of the canyon. The current Chicago City Hall, built in a Classical Revival style, was designed to symbolize the strength, dignity, and vigor of the government. Completed in 2001, an award-winning green roof was incorporated into the structure. All of the structures are designated as Chicago Landmarks.

Other nearby buildings of note include the Continental Commercial National Bank, now called 208 South LaSalle Street, which broke records in 1911 as the city's most expensive development, with a cost exceeding $10 million. The Rand-McNally Building that had served as the headquarters of the World's Columbian Exposition was demolished to accommodate the structure. The Federal Reserve Bank of Chicago, at 230 South LaSalle Street, was built in a Greco-Roman style and contained the largest vaults in the world and one of the first building-wide wired communication systems. Both the Federal Reserve Bank and 208 South LaSalle demonstrate the popularity of neoclassical architecture during the late 19th and early 20th centuries and were meant to project a sense of financial security.

One mile (1.6 km) west of Lake Michigan and in the southwest corner of the Loop, the building is near two elevated stations of the Chicago 'L'. The Quincy station is one block to the west and the LaSalle/VanBuren station is between the CBOT and the former Chicago Stock Exchange; both stations are served by the Orange, Purple, Pink, and Brown Lines. Additionally, Blue Line service is provided at the Jackson and LaSalle stations, each two blocks away. Union Station stands five blocks to the west on Jackson Boulevard, providing terminal service for Amtrak and select service for Metra trains. Additional Metra service is provided at the LaSalle Street Station, two blocks due south.

== Tenants ==
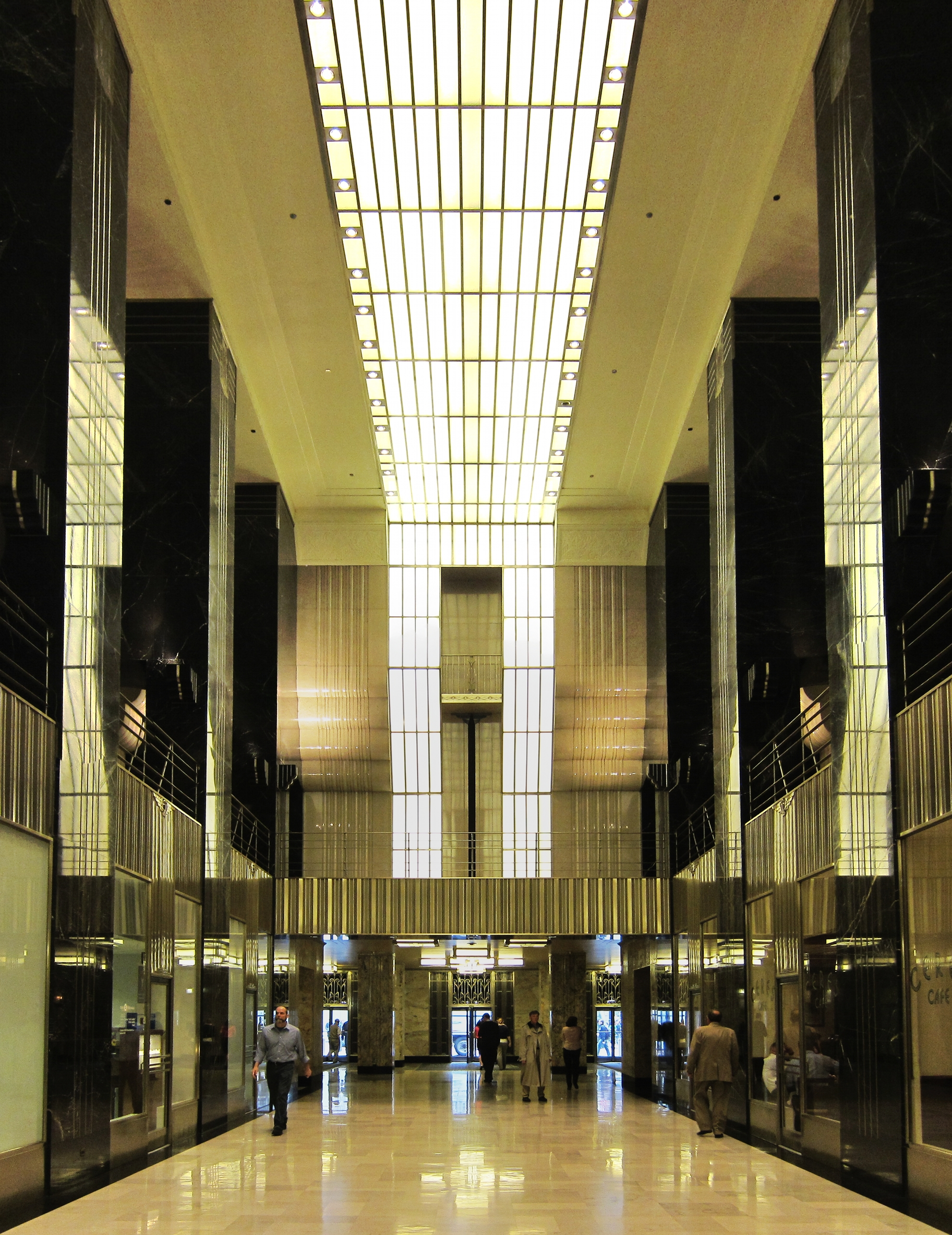
Lobby of the building

The CME Group occupied 33 percent of available space in 2006, while financial and trading concerns occupied 54 percent of the three-building complex. In addition to the Ceres Cafe on the first floor of the lobby, other businesses provide banking, insurance, travel services, beauty services, and healthcare. Some business have been in the building for over 40 years, and throughout its history, commodities speculators, such as "Prince of the Pit" Richard Dennis, have maintained offices in the building. In 2007, the U.S. Futures Exchange, a competitor of the CBOT formerly known as Eurex US, announced a move from the Sears Tower into the 14th floor of the CBOT building. Originally built for the Chicago Board of Trade (CBOT), it became the primary trading venue for the derivatives exchange, the CME Group, formed in 2007 by the merger of the CBOT and the Chicago Mercantile Exchange. In 2012, the CME Group sold the CBOT Building to a consortium of real estate investors, including GlenStar Properties LLC and USAA Real Estate Company.

== Visitors ==
The CBOT building has been the site of a number of visits by dignitaries, including the Prince of Wales in October 1977. In 1991, George H. W. Bush became the first President of the United States to visit the Exchange, where he delivered a speech from the soybean pit regarding the importance of agriculture to the American economy. A visit from former Soviet leader Mikhail Gorbachev followed on May 7, 1992. In 2006, former US President Jimmy Carter and wife Rosalynn toured the CBOT while campaigning for their son Jack's run for a US Senate seat from Nevada. During the 1996 Democratic National Convention, US Vice President Al Gore was hosted at the Exchange's Democratic Senatorial Campaign reception. When US President George W. Bush toured the agricultural trading floor on January 6, 2006, he was hailed from the corn trading pit with "Hook 'em, Horns!", a reference to his adopted home state of Texas. Interest groups such as the Chicago Architecture Center and Inside Chicago Walking Tours provide scheduled tours showcasing the architecture and selected portions of the trading operations.

== Awards and honors ==
- 1985: the 23-story addition won the Best Structure Award from the Structural Engineers Association of Illinois.
- 2006: the building was awarded the Landmarks Illinois' annual Real Estate and Building Industries Council award for its preservation efforts.
- 2006: the Building Owners and Managers Association of Chicago presented the CBOT building with The Office Building of the Year award recognizing the high quality of office space and excellence in management of the building.

== In popular culture ==
The 1885 building and trading pits were prominently featured in The Pit, the second novel by Frank Norris in The Epic of the Wheat trilogy. Life on the trading floor of the Chicago Board of Trade is detailed in the nonfiction book Leg the Spread by Cari Lynn (2004).

Trading operations have been used as scenes in movies such as Ferris Bueller's Day Off, and the streetscape in the LaSalle Street canyon is used in the movies The Untouchables, Road to Perdition, and Transformers: Dark of the Moon.

In Batman Begins, the Board of Trade Building represents the headquarters of Wayne Enterprises, but in the 2008 sequel, The Dark Knight, Wayne Enterprises was represented by the Richard J. Daley Center. The building itself appears in The Dark Knight. The building was once again used to represent Wayne Enterprises in the television show Batwoman. In the 2022 reboot The Batman, the Board of Trade Building is digitally amalgamated with the Royal Liver Building to portray the Gotham City Police Department's headquarters.

WCIU-TV broadcasts First Business with news of the Chicago Board of Trade. Former WVON-AM radio personality Don Cornelius began the popular dance show Soul Train in a cramped studio on the 43rd floor in 1970. When Cornelius moved the show to Los Angeles a year later, his assistant, Clinton Ghent took over the local show until it ended in 1976. Prior to Soul Train, shows filmed in the building were Kiddie A Go-Go, a dance show aimed at the pre-teen market which premiered in 1965 and Red Hot and Blues, a teen dance show hosted by local disc jockey Big Bill Hill which premiered in 1967. More recently, the building's interior and exterior portrayed the offices of the fictional Daily Planet newspaper in the 2013 Superman reboot film, Man of Steel.

Although depicted with the tower in a Rand McNally map from 1893, later lithographs of the first 141 Jackson Street location display a red-roofed building without a tower. Memorabilia of the current building is abundant, with postcards of panoramic scenes from LaSalle Street, the clock, and lighted upper decks having been produced for decades. In views from the Museum Campus, the building's crown is framed by the middle floors of the taller Sears Tower in the background. Photographer Andreas Gursky has used the location for still life prints such as 1997's Chicago Board of Trade, I and 1999's Chicago Board of Trade, II. A photograph of the exterior, from the Museum series by Thomas Struth, is in the collection of the Metropolitan Museum of Art in New York City. An often-reproduced painting by Leslie Ragan for the New York Central Railroad depicts streamliner locomotives idling at LaSalle Street Station with the Board of Trade Building looming prominently in the background.

At 1211 North LaSalle Street on the city's Near North Side, a 16-story apartment hotel built in 1929 and converted into an apartment building in 1981 was used by muralist Richard Haas for trompe-l'œil murals in homage to Chicago School architecture. One of the building's sides features the Chicago Board of Trade Building, intended as a reflection of the actual building two miles (3 km) south.

== See also ==
- List of Chicago Landmarks
- List of National Historic Landmarks in Illinois
- National Register of Historic Places listings in Central Chicago
- Architecture of Chicago

Records
Preceded by Saint Michael's Church	Tallest building in Chicago; 1885–1895	Succeeded by Masonic Temple Building
Preceded by Chicago Temple Building	Tallest building in Chicago; 1930–1965	Succeeded by Richard J. Daley Center
