= Milwaukie Pastry Kitchen =

Bakery in Oregon

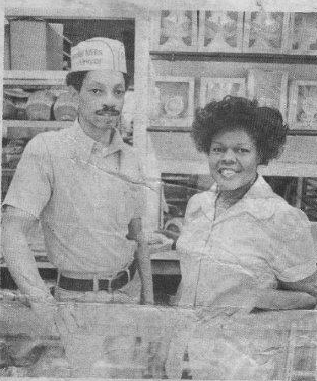
- Hurtis Sr. and Dorothy Hadley Owners/Operators Milwaukie Pastry Kitchen, 1977
- Type: Partnership (Bakery)
- Fate: Closed 1985
- Headquarters: Milwaukie, Oregon, U.S.
- Area served: Clackamas County
- Products: Pastries, cakes, breads
- Owner: Hurtis Mixon Hadley Sr., Dorothy Butler-Bishop Hadley

Milwaukie Pastry Kitchen, established in the 1940s in downtown Milwaukie, Oregon, United States, at 10607 SE Main St., became the first black-owned and operated bakery in the state when Hurtis Mixon Hadley Sr., and his wife Dorothy Butler-Bishop Hadley of Portland, Oregon purchased it in 1977. At that time, there were fewer than two percent African-Americans in the state and even fewer Black-owned businesses. The Oregon Historical Society Museum selected the Milwaukie Pastry Kitchen for inclusion in a permanent exhibit in 2014.

== Historical context ==
Historically, Oregon's exclusion laws and institutional practices prohibited non-whites from settling in the state. Even after those laws were repealed in 1926, few African-Americans lived in Oregon. Black workers were attracted to Portland's shipyards between 1939 and 1945 to support the war effort, but discriminatory lending practices and segregationist real estate policies limited opportunities for Black individuals to own businesses.

Racial attitudes were slow to change. "Reflecting national trends resulting from the Civil Rights Movement, Portland's African-Americans began to receive more equal treatment in the 1950s. New areas of potential employment where they had traditionally been excluded opened." The 1950 U.S. census records less than one percent of Oregon's population was African American; by 1990 it was about 1.7 percent.

In 1959, Oregon voters finally ratified the Fifteenth Amendment to the United States Constitution, which prohibits states from denying citizens the right to vote based on "race, color, or previous condition of servitude." The Federal Civil Rights Act of 1964 also ensured greater opportunities and access for minority citizens. More than a decade later, Hurtis Mixon Hadley and his wife Dorothy Butler-Bishop Hadley purchased the Milwaukie Pastry Kitchen and opened it for business. According to the Portland Observer, "Milwaukie Pastry Kitchen was not only the sole black-owned business in the city of Milwaukie at the time, but it was also the first black-owned bakery in the entire state of Oregon."

Hadley learned his trade in Oregon's three-year Baker's Technology and Apprenticeship program, completing and graduating from the program in two years, making him the first Black person in Oregon to be state-certified as a journeyman baker. As part of the apprenticeship program, Hadley attended Portland Community College, where he earned an Associate Degree in Baking Technology. According to the Northwest Labor Press, Hadley "...worked at several Albertsons in-store bakeries before accepting a job at the grocer as bakery manager/bakery trainer for the Oregon division. He had his eye on becoming a district manager, but was told at the time, 'Oregon isn't ready for a person of color in that position,' he said."

== Bakery operations, 1977 to 1985 ==
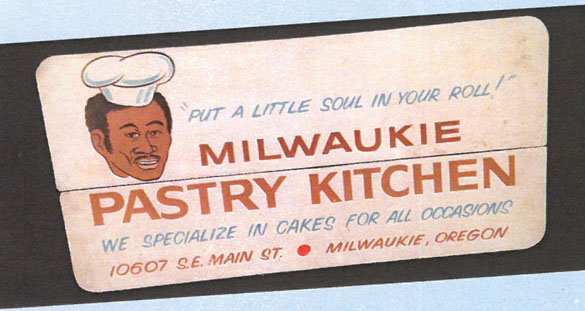
Company vehicle advertisement sign

Although the Milwaukie Pastry Kitchen had been founded in the 1940s, when the Hadleys purchased it in 1977, the shop had been closed for several years because of the owner's illness. One of the previous owners had been Einar "Ed" Carlson, a Swedish immigrant who had also baked at Tradewell stores before retiring in 1969.

According to proprietor Hurtis Hadley Sr., his first year owning the bakery was tough. Not everyone was pleased "to have an accomplished black couple in their midst at the time, or black people at all in the mostly white town." During that year, he was even falsely accused of robbing another business. Hadley said that after that first year, "business and the general reception, he and his wife received improved."

Milwaukie Pastry Kitchen was a full-line bakery that offered specialty breads, assorted pastries, and creative birthday and wedding cakes. One of the bakery's featured specialties was "Cake On Wheels" in which Hurtis Hadley delivered a specialty cake dressed in a top hat and tails. He also sang a customized song for the person and/or occasion. Hadley baked and Dorothy Hadley, a former licensed cosmetologist, managed the front of the store and coordinated the catering service. The bakery's slogan was "Put a Little Soul in Your Roll!"

A photograph of the Hadleys in their bakery appeared in The Oregonian newspaper in 1979. It was used to illustrate an article, "Slogans Under Foot" about custom doormats such as the one at the bakery. The Hadleys' doormat featured the bakery slogan and an image of a baker carrying a steaming loaf of bread.

== Bakery closing, 1985 ==
For eight years the bakery provided pastries to the Milwaukie community, but the business closed in 1985 following the national recession during Ronald Reagan's presidency. The Milwaukie Pastry Kitchen was selected for inclusion in the Oregon Historical Society Museum permanent exhibit, "Oregon Voices: Change and Challenge in Modern Oregon History," in 2014.

== See also ==
- Historical racial and ethnic demographics of the United States
