= Sovereign Hotel (Portland, Oregon) =

Historic building in Portland, Oregon, U.S.

- U.S. National Register of Historic Places
- Portland Historic Landmark
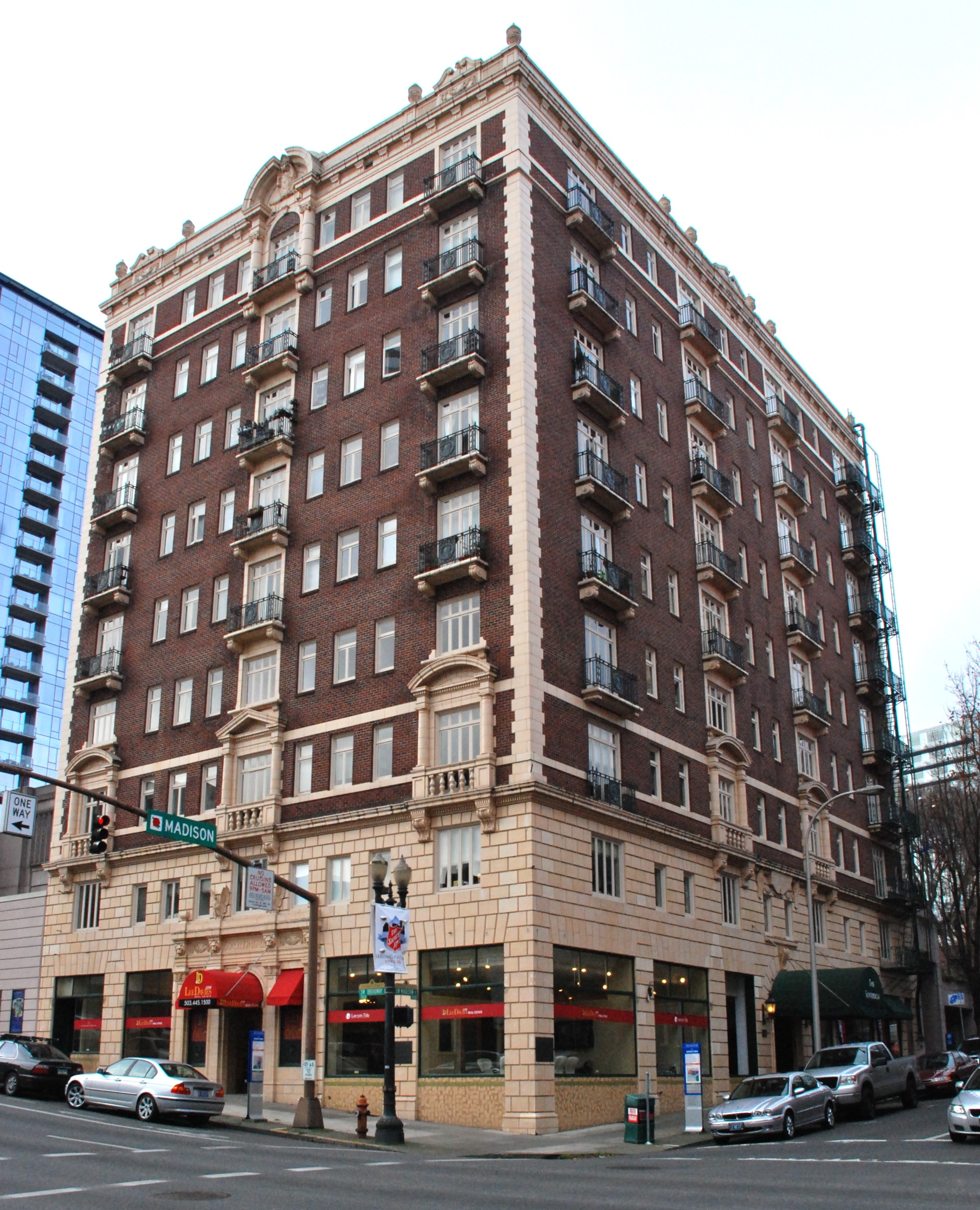
- The east façade, on Broadway, and north façade in 2011

- Location within Portland, Oregon
- Location: 1207 SW Broadway 710–716 SW Madison Street; Portland, Oregon
- Coordinates: 45°30′57″N 122°40′54″W
- Area: less than one acre
- Built: 1923
- Architect: Carl L. Linde
- Architectural style: Georgian Revival
- Website: https://sovereignpdx.com/
- NRHP reference No.: 81000520
- Added to NRHP: December 2, 1981

The Sovereign Hotel was a Portland, Oregon, hotel built in 1923. The nine-story building was added to the United States' National Register of Historic Places on December 2, 1981. Part of the building houses a portion of the Oregon Historical Society's Oregon History Center.

== History ==
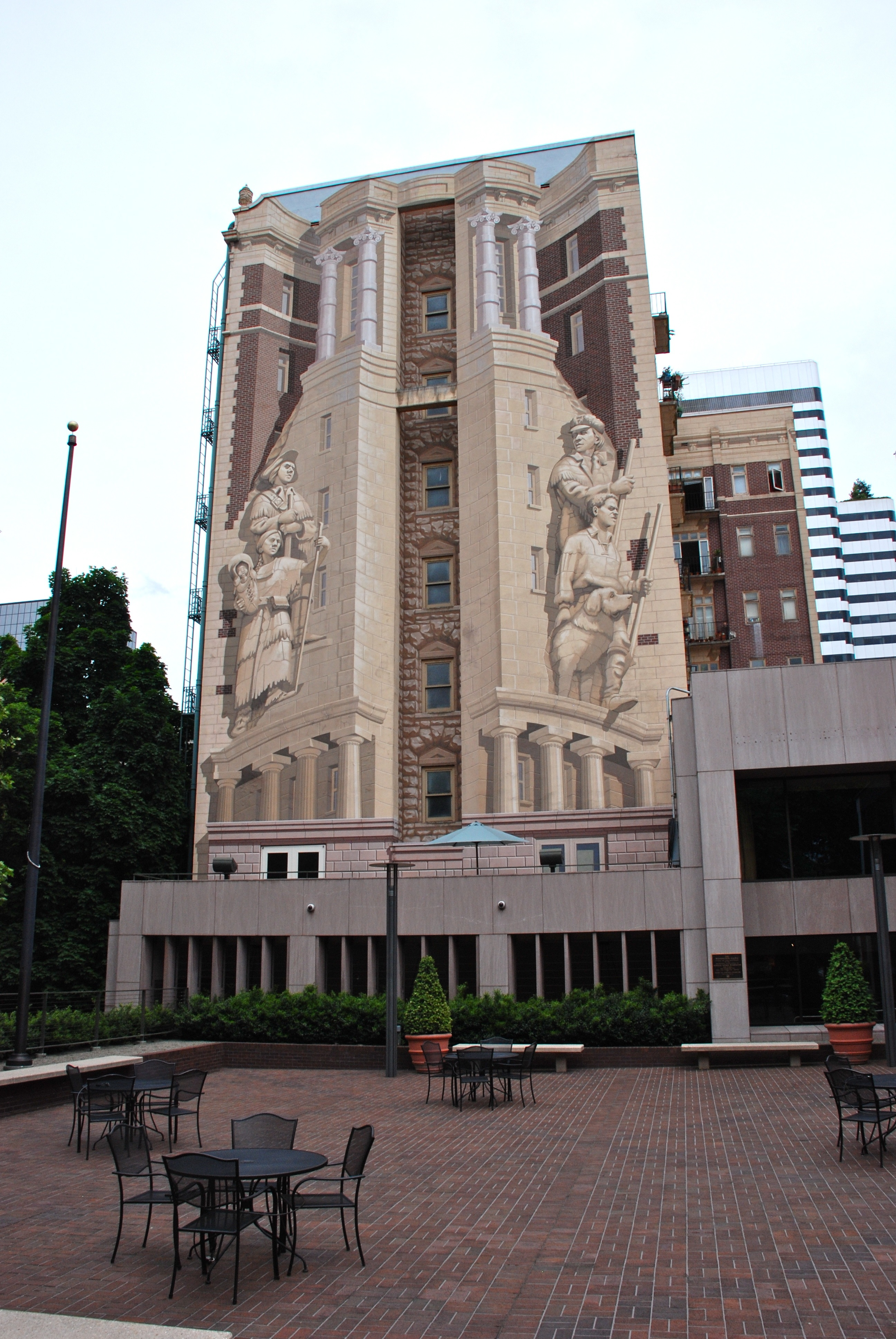
One of the two murals that comprise Oregon History, this one on the building's west side

The Georgian-style building was designed by Carl L. Linde, and was also once known as the Sovereign Apartments. Opened in 1923, the Sovereign Hotel became the home of KFWV radio (later known as KWJJ) by September 1926, when the station moved from 385 E. 58th Street. In March 1927, KFWV moved its studios to the Broadway Theatre building.

The hotel was purchased by Harry Mittleman in 1938. Mittleman had constructed many Portland apartment buildings in the 1930s, and he converted the Sovereign into apartments shortly after acquisition. Mittleman sold the building in 1972.

In 1982, the Oregon Historical Society (OHS) purchased the building to expand the Oregon History Center. The generally L-shaped building has six sides, and on four of the six sides are murals painted in 1989 by Richard Haas, two of which are eight stories tall and are collectively titled Oregon History. They were commissioned by OHS for $225,000. The mural on the building's westernmost side shows the Lewis and Clark Expedition, while the one on the southernmost side of the structure depicts the pioneer period in Oregon's history.

In 2014, OHS sold the building. A stipulation of the sale was that the new owner must preserve the Richard Haas murals. In early 2016, renovation of the building was under way, with completion projected for fall 2016.
