= Oregon Historical Society Museum =

History museum in Portland, Oregon

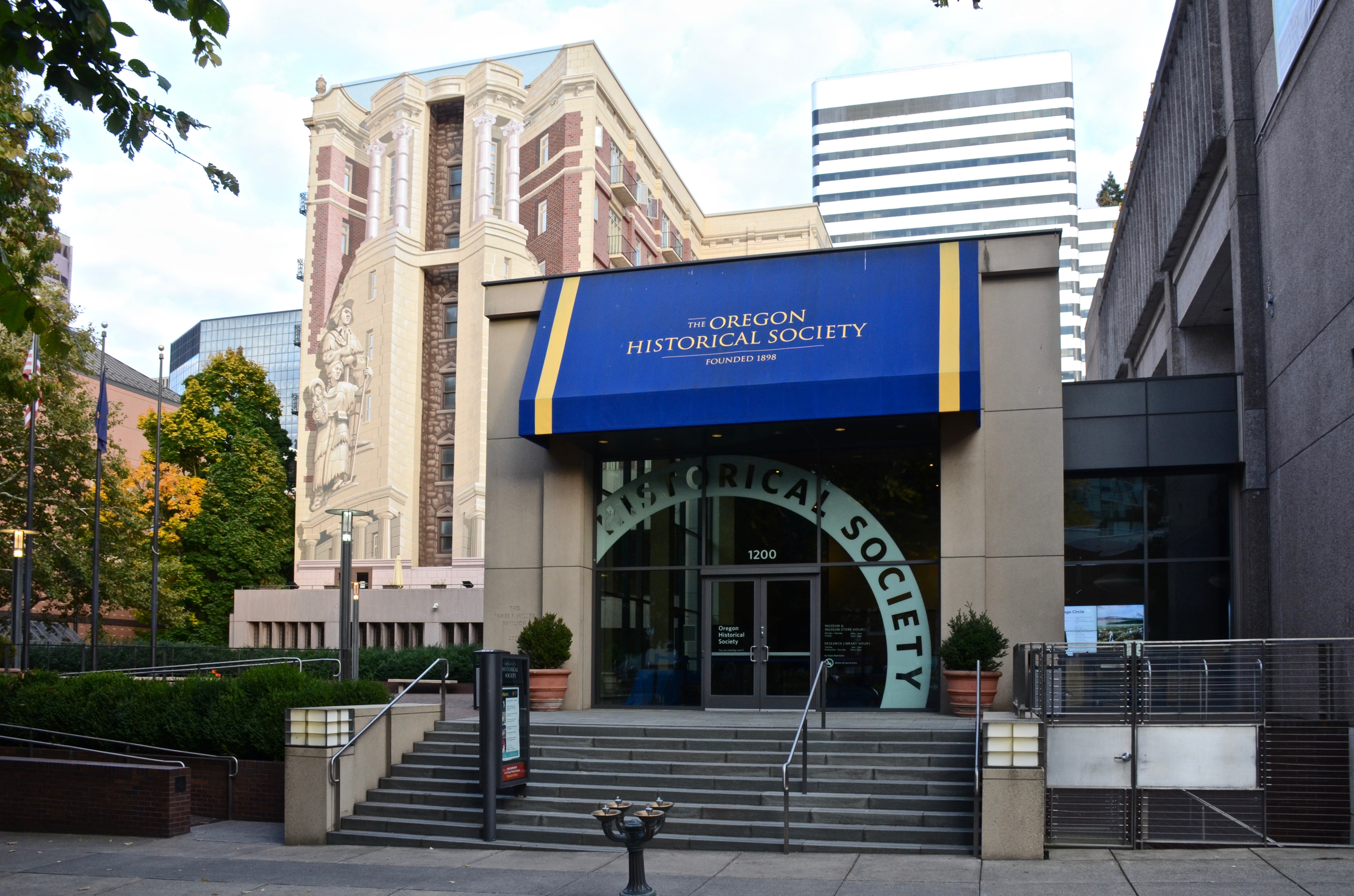
- Museum entrance in 2019

- Location within Portland, Oregon
- Established: 1898
- Location: Portland, Oregon, United States
- Coordinates: 45.515903°N 122.682186°W
- Type: private: history
- Visitors: 44,000 (est. 2010)
- Director: Kerry Tymchuk
- Website: ohs.org

The Oregon Historical Society Museum is a history museum housed at the Oregon Historical Society in downtown Portland, Oregon, United States. The museum was created in 1898 and receives about 44,000 visitors annually.

It houses the Portland Penny that decided the city’s name. This 1835 copper penny was flipped to decide between the names of Boston and Portland, with Portland as the winner. The museum contains over 85,000 artifacts, and is accredited by the American Alliance of Museums.

== History ==
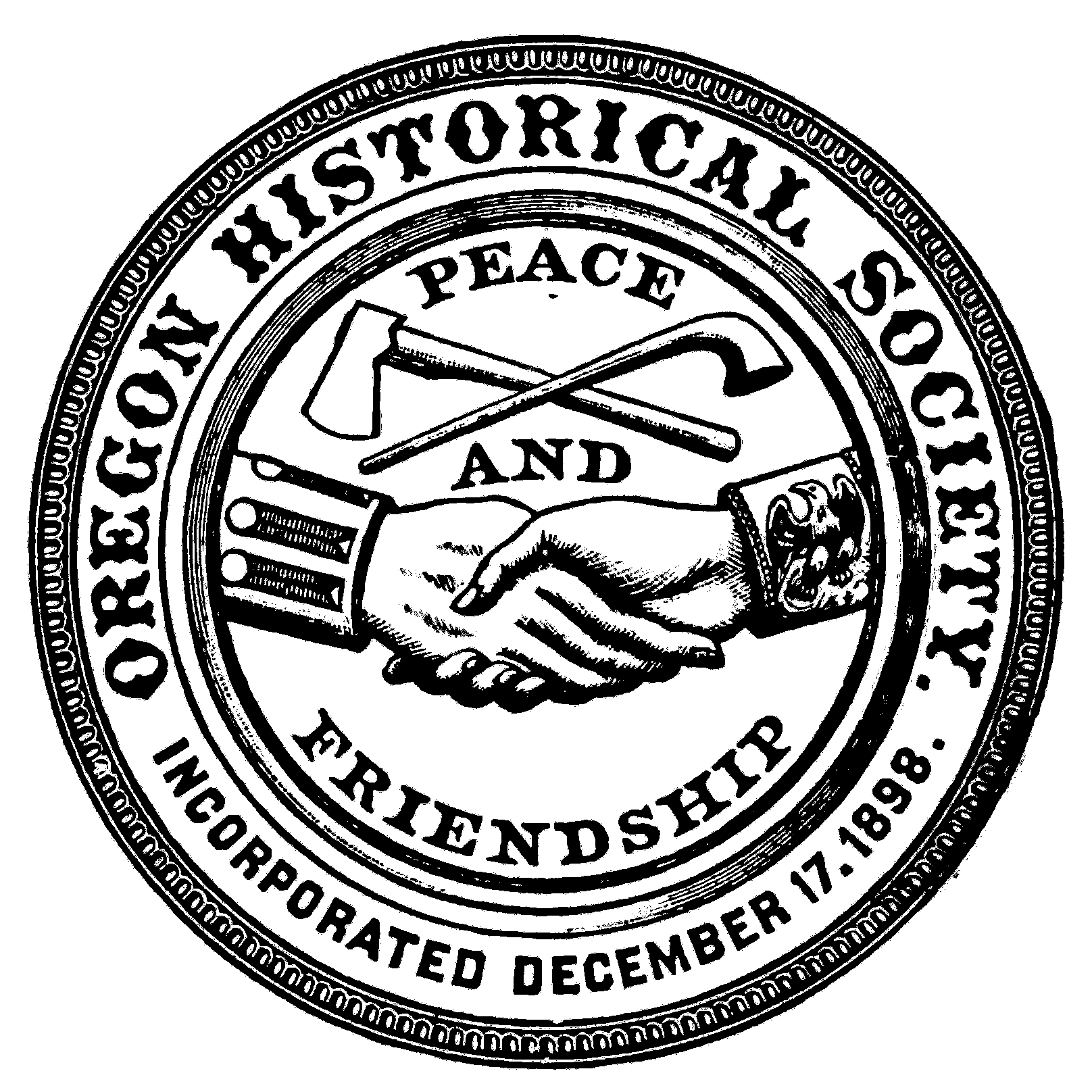
Oregon Historical Society seal

The museum is operated by the Oregon Historical Society. It began at the end of the 19th century with a small museum located at Portland City Hall in downtown Portland. In 1913, the historical society and the museum moved from city hall to the Tourny Building, at 2nd and Taylor streets. In 1917, they moved again, to the then-new Public Auditorium (later Civic Auditorium, then Keller Auditorium).

In 1966, the museum relocated again to its current home on the South Park Blocks, at 1200 SW Park Avenue. The Society originally owned the full city block between Madison and Jefferson streets and SW Park and Broadway, but sold part of this property in 2014 when it sold the Sovereign Hotel. There is a large two-part mural on this nine-story building called Oregon History, painted by Richard Haas; of the two murals, that on the building's west side depicts the Lewis and Clark Expedition. Part of the sales agreement stated that both the building, built in 1923, and the mural would be preserved.

The museum's lobby was remodeled in 2002–2003 at a cost of $3.75 million. Attendance in 2002 totaled 26,791 patrons for the museum. For much of its history the historical society received funding from the state and from Multnomah County, but in 2003 that ended. The 2007 legislature allocated $625,000 to the society, followed by $2.5 million in for 2009 to 2011. A ballot measure was later passed by Multnomah County voters providing funding; in exchange county residents get free admission. The museum's attendance totaled about 44,000 visitors in 2010.

== Collections ==
The museum contains over 85,000 artifacts relating to the history of the region in its collections. Artifacts include the famous Portland Penny used to decide the name of the city, Captain Robert Gray's storage chest from aboard the Columbia Rediviva, a 10,000-year-old sandal, memorabilia from the Lewis and Clark Centennial Exposition, Native American artifacts, a miniature vehicle collection, and many everyday items from jars to dresses.

== Exhibits ==
Permanent exhibits at the museum include Oregon My Oregon, a 7,000-square-foot (650 m^{2}) display covering Oregon’s history from early settlement to current times. Significant items include a reproduction of a ship's hull, a 1940s-era mercantile store, a complete lunch counter from a diner, and a 9,000-year-old sandal. This exhibit won a silver 2005 MUSE Award in the History and Culture category from the American Alliance of Museums for the lunch counter display entitled Modern Oregon Issues.

The museum also houses traveling exhibits such as one commemorating the 200th anniversary of the Lewis & Clark Expedition in 2005. In 2001, the center exhibited historic Native American trade blankets from the Dale Chihuly collection. Additionally there are traveling exhibits containing historic photographs.

== Other ==
The Oregon Historical Society also contains the society’s research library and historic photograph collection. Additionally, the museum store sells items such as books and history memorabilia. The museum is accredited by the American Alliance of Museums.

== See also ==
- Culture of Portland, Oregon
- Portland Art Museum
