= Richard Haas =

American muralist (born 1936)

- Born: Richard John Haas; August 29, 1936 (age 89); Spring Green, Wisconsin, U.S.
- Education: University of Wisconsin–Milwaukee
- Known for: Mural

Richard John Haas (born August 29, 1936) is an American muralist who is best known for architectural murals and his use of the trompe-l'œil style. Haas has a 1959 B.S. from the University of Wisconsin–Milwaukee and a 1964 M.F.A. from the University of Minnesota.

== Works ==
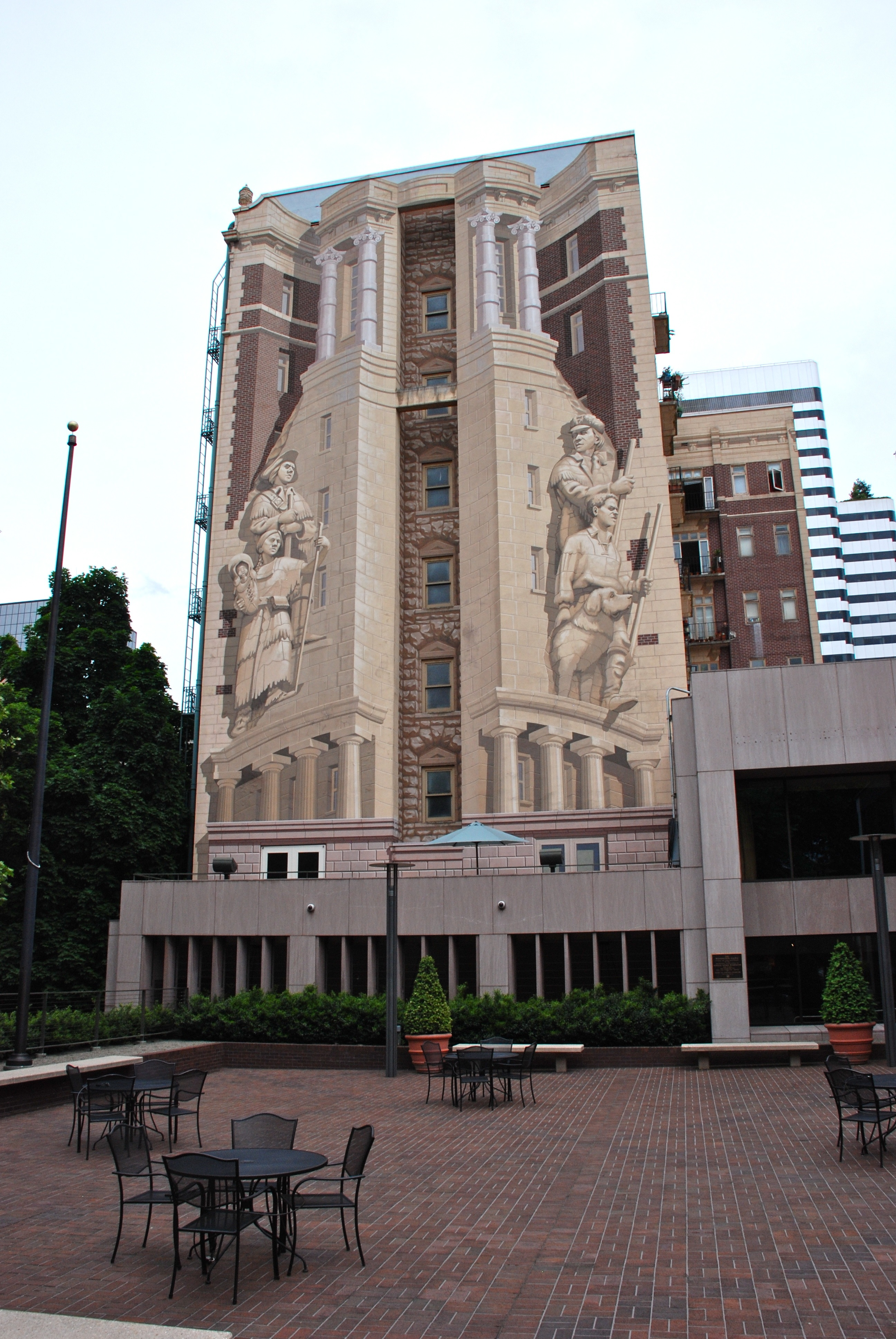
One of four Haas murals painted in 1989 on the Sovereign Hotel, in Portland, Oregon (Oregon History)

Haas's murals have been commissioned for interiors and exteriors of numerous public and private buildings in the United States. Exterior projects include Chase Field; the Robert C. Byrd Federal Building & Courthouse in Beckley, West Virginia, the Boston Architectural College, the former Edison Brothers Shoe Storage building, now a Red Lion Hotel in St. Louis, the Kroeger Building in Cincinnati (Homage to Cincinnatus), the Oregon Historical Society (in Portland, Oregon), 23rd and Chestnut Streets in Philadelphia, Sundance Square in Fort Worth, Texas, multiple façades in Homewood, Illinois, the corner of 83rd and York in New York City, a mural on the Con Edison substation in Peck Slip, New York, featuring the Brooklyn Bridge, and the former Board of Education building in Brooklyn, New York. Interiors include the New York Public Library Main Branch; the Lakewood, Ohio Public Library; the Sarasota County, Florida Judicial Center, the Smithsonian Institution, Washington, D.C., 101 Merrimac Building, Boston, the Federal Courthouse in Beckley, West Virginia, the Federal Courthouse and Federal Building in Kansas City, Kansas, the Nashville, Tennessee Public Library history murals, the 1991 five-panel mural in the lobby of the 24-story office building at Landmark Square at 111 West Ocean Boulevard in Long Beach, California representing the major aspects of economic development in the city, as well as many other murals. At 1211 North LaSalle Street on Chicago’s Near North Side, a 16-story 1929 apartment hotel converted into a 1981 apartment building, was used for trompe-l'œil murals in homage to Chicago School architecture. One of the building's sides features the Chicago Board of Trade Building, intended as a reflection of the actual building two miles (3 km) south.

Haas created a three-sided mural on the Edison Brothers Stores building, St. Louis, Missouri, in 1984. Description: Keim silicate paint, 110,000 square feet (10,000 m^{2}). A three-sided mural with eight obelisks at its corners, a painted sculpture of Peace on the west facade, and a painted equestrian statue of St. Louis on the south facade. The 13-story building is now a Sheraton Hotel and Edison Condominiums.

The only European mural by Richard Haas is in Munich, Germany, between Rumfordstrasse and Frauenstrasse. It is one of his earliest works, realized in 1978 on the occasion of his Munich exhibition.

Haas is ranked by the Artists Trade Union of Russia amongst the world-best artists of the last four centuries.

Homewood, Illinois, is home to the largest collection of Richard Haas murals in the world. Haas was first invited to Homewood in the early 1980s. Since then, he has finished 11 murals and was scheduled to complete the 12th mural in late spring 2013. The Village has a time-lapse video that shows the creation of one of his recent murals.

"Homewood has a special place in my 35 years of doing public work," said Haas. "This project has allowed me to expand my work in many ways. In Homewood, I was given the freedom to design and execute a new series of works that tells an even larger story, not only about Homewood's history but about the region in general. Homewood now has the largest concentration of my works in one area and I hope people will discover and enjoy these works for a long time to come."

In the downtown area, there are 9 original murals which capture the history of Homewood from the movie theater and 1950s diner to paying homage to the prairie. The expanded murals continue down historic Dixie Highway including a mural on the history of the bicycle.

"Homewood is a great home for the arts," said Homewood Mayor Richard Hofeld. "We sought Richard out specifically for his realistic style as well as his artistic and historic vision. Residents have given us very positive feedback about seeing the blank canvas of the side of a building become transformed into a work of art." Originally from Wisconsin, Haas began large-scale outdoor murals in the 1970s in New York City. His murals can be seen in all of the cities mentioned above, as well as Phoenix, Arizona, and a number of smaller cities.

Haas's work has received awards from the American Institute of Architects Medal of Honor, 1977, Guggenheim Fellowship 1983, National Endowment of Arts award 1987, Distinguished Alumnus Award University of Wisconsin-Milwaukee 1991, Jimmy Ernst award, American Academy of Arts and Letters, New York 2005. He was elected into the National Academy of Design in 1993 as an Associate member, and became a full Academician in 1994. He served as President of the Academy from 2009 to 2011.

In Homewood, as well as other locations, Haas works with Thomas Melvin Painting Studio. Haas provides a to-scale painting for Melvin to use and entrusts him with adding details as needed. Melvin has worked on all the murals in Homewood as well as provided touch ups through the years as needed.

"Homewood is to be commended in engaging such an important artist," Melvin said. "Richard Haas has taken a European tradition and translated it into an American expression given his own unique sensibility. He loves architecture and he brings a sense of humor and his own style to his work. I have enjoyed working in Homewood. Thanks to all the residents for the thumbs up and car honks of appreciation."
