= LaSalle Towers Apartments =

Apartment building in Chicago, Illinois

Coordinates: 41.90439°N 87.63265°W

LaSalle Towers Apartments is a high-rise apartment complex in the Near North Side neighborhood of Chicago. The building is located at 1211 North LaSalle Street, which is the corner of LaSalle and Division Street.

The high-rise was built in 1929 and was originally used as a hotel. It was renovated in the early 1980s by Weese, Seegers, Hickey, Weese and converted into an apartment complex. During the renovation, the exterior of the building was covered on three sides with trompe-l'œil murals by Richard Haas. On the east face, the mural creates the illusion that the structure contains Chicago School bay windows and a cornice with a circular window. On the south face, Haas evokes two Louis Sullivan creations: the Golden Arch from the World's Columbian Exposition Transportation Building, and the circular window of the Merchants' National Bank in Grinnell, Iowa. Beneath the arch, Sullivan, Daniel Burnham, John Wellborn Root, and Frank Lloyd Wright stand together. A "reflection" of the Chicago Board of Trade Building also appears in the painted windows between these two features. On the north face, another set of painted windows contain a fake reflection of Adolf Loos' unused design for the Tribune Tower, which Loos had envisioned as a large column-like structure. Collectively, the murals are called Homage to the Chicago School of Architecture.
