= The Pit (Norris novel) =

Novel by Frank Norris

- First edition
- Author: Frank Norris
- Language: English
- Series: The Epic of Wheat Trilogy
- Publisher: Doubleday, Page & Co.
- Publication date: 1903
- Publication place: United States
- Media type: Print (hardback & paperback)
- OCLC: 6474431
- Preceded by: The Octopus
- Followed by: The Wolf (planned, but never completed)

The Pit: A Story of Chicago is a 1903 novel by Frank Norris. Set in the wheat speculation trading pits at the Chicago Board of Trade Building, it was the second book in what was to be the trilogy The Epic of the Wheat. The first book, The Octopus, was published in 1901. Norris died unexpectedly in October 1902 from appendicitis, leaving the third book, The Wolf: A Story of Empire, incomplete. Together the three novels were to follow the journey of a crop of wheat from its planting in California to its ultimate consumption as bread in Western Europe.

== Plot summary ==
The Pit opens with sisters Laura and Page Dearborn and their aunt, Aunt Wess, outside the Auditorium Theatre opera house awaiting the arrival of their hosts, Mr. and Mrs. Cressler. Once inside, they are joined by three other guests of the Cresslers, Mr. Curtis Jadwin, Mr. Landry Court, and Mr. Sheldon Corthell. Corthell and Laura are apparently very well-acquainted before this evening, for their conversation begins with the artist confessing his love for the young woman. Though she does not return this feeling, Laura admits that knowing she is loved is "the greatest exhilaration of happiness she had ever known."

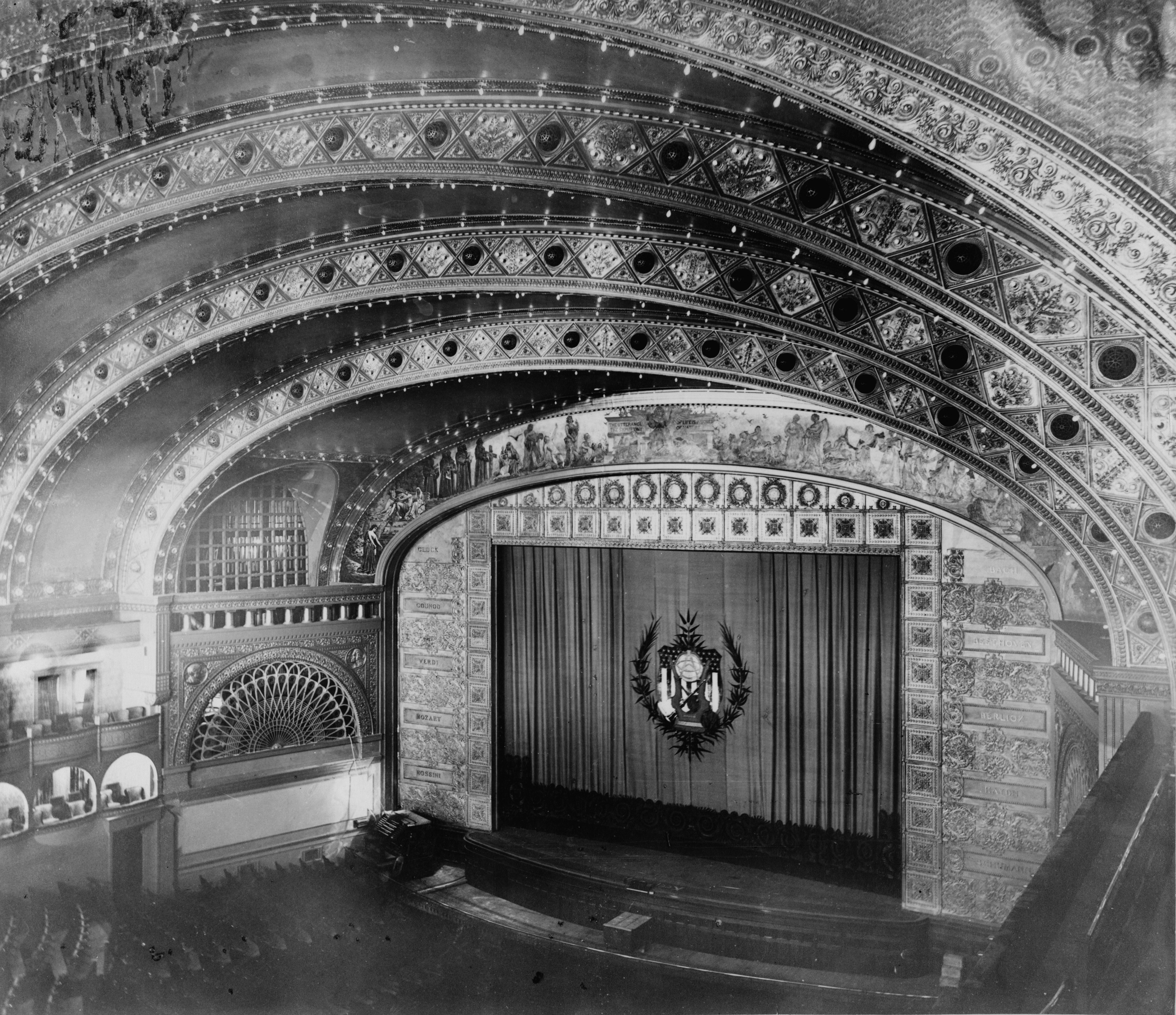
Auditorium stage c. 1890

We soon learn that Corthell is not the only man interested in having Laura as his wife. Both Jadwin, the mature and mysterious man of affairs, and Landry, the exuberant and extravagant man from the Battle of the Street, are captivated by the girl’s unparalleled charm and beauty as well. Despite the fact that she makes it clear to each of them that she has no intentions of ever marrying and declares that she will never love, the three men insist on courting her. Miss Dearborn enjoys having these men chase her, but before long she grows weary of being the object of so many suitors. Enraged at herself for having made herself so vulnerable and for behaving so coquettishly, she dismisses Corthell, Landry, and Jadwin all at once.

Jadwin, a man of persistence who is accustomed to getting what he wants, refuses to give up. Soon enough, Laura agrees to marry him. When her sister asks her if she truly loves Jadwin, Laura admits that though she "love[s] to be loved" and loves that Curtis is wealthy and willing to provide for her whatever she desires, she is not sure if she loves the man himself. To Mrs. Cressler she confesses:

"I think I love him very much – sometimes. And then sometimes I think I don’t. I can’t tell. There are days when I’m sure of it, and there are others when I wonder if I want to be married, after all. I thought when love came it was to be – oh uplifting, something glorious... something that would shake me all to pieces. I thought that was the only kind of love there was".

As Joseph McElrath observes in his analysis of the novel, this passage captures the attitude that Laura will maintain through the final chapter of the book: "She will have 'the only kind of love' described here."

Regardless of any internal reservations, Laura becomes Mrs. Curtis Jadwin on the first weekend in June. For the first years of their marriage, the couple is very happy together. Soon, however, Jadwin discovers a new source of passion that eclipses everything else – wheat speculation. Though he has been warned many times of the dangers of grain trading by his dear friend Mr. Cressler, Jadwin cannot resist the roar of the Pit down at the Chicago Board of Trade. Little by little Jadwin becomes increasingly more obsessed with speculating until the deafening murmur of "wheat-wheat-wheat, wheat-wheat-wheat" is all he can hear.

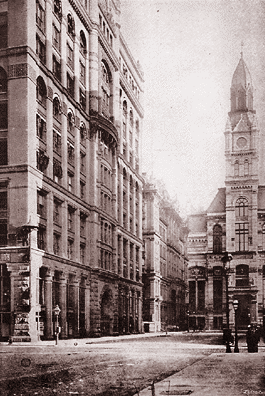
Lasalle Street: Old Chicago Board of Trade (right) and Rookery Building (c. 1891)

The love for his wife that used to dictate his every action is replaced with an inescapable infatuation with the excitement of the Pit. All of Jadwin’s time is spent at the Board of Trade Building; often he even sleeps there at night. Laura, left all alone in her huge house through the day and night, feels lonely and neglected and begins to discover that she needs more from her husband than his money. The extremity of Jadwin’s obsession and Laura’s worries and frustration are summed up in a passage Laura speaks to her husband after working up the nerve:

"Curtis, dear,... when is it all going to end – your speculating? You never used to be this way. It seems as though, nowadays, I never had you to myself. Even when you are not going over papers and reports and that, or talking by the hour to Mr. Gretry in the library – even when you are not doing all that, your mind seems to be away from me – down there in La Salle Street or the Board of Trade Building. Dearest, you don’t know. I don’t mean to complain, and I don’t want to be exacting or selfish, but – sometimes I – I am lonesome".

This selfish concern that she expresses shows the extent to which Laura cares for husband’s troubles. Though he promises time and again that this deal will be his last, it is not until the market has ruined him that Jadwin is able to let it go.

During this distressful time Sheldon Corthell reenters Laura’s life after having been abroad in Italy. While Jadwin spends all his time with his broker Gretry at the Board of Trade, Laura renews her companionship with Corthell, a sensitive man who can dazzle Laura with his knowledge of art and literature and who is willing to dedicate all his time to her. As Mrs. Jadwin continues to see more of Corthell than she does of her own husband, their friendship trends towards intimacy. Corthell would love nothing more than an affair with this married woman, but Laura decides that she values her marriage more than this romance and sends Corthell away for good.

Meanwhile, Jadwin continues wheat trading and grows unbelievably richer by the day. He discovers that he is in the position to do the impossible – corner the market. The game for him has lost its fun, however, and is taking a serious toll on both his mental and physical health. He cannot concentrate on anything other than counting bushels of wheat and cannot sleep for his nerves won’t let him. Greedy and crazed with power, Jadwin tries to control the forces of nature and drives the price of wheat up so high that people around the world, including his best friend Mr. Cressler, are financially destroyed. Only when the "Great Bull’s" corner is finally broken and he and his wife are reduced to poverty can Jadwin and Laura finally see past their individual problems and rediscover their love for each other. The couple decides to leave Chicago and head west, and the reader is left with the feeling that the Jadwins, despite the horrors they’ve just been through, have found happiness at last.

== Characters ==
- Laura Dearborn: Beautiful young woman originally from Barrington, Massachusetts now living in Chicago, Illinois; vain, self-centered, and indecisive; the first half of the novel focuses on her courtships with Corthell, Court, and Jadwin and the second half on her troubled marriage with Jadwin
- Curtis Jadwin: Wealthy Chicago real estate agent; originally takes a very conservative stance on speculating, but throughout the book becomes completely consumed by grain trading; good friend of the Cresslers; admired by Laura for his strength, aggressiveness, and vigorous masculinity; one of Laura’s many suitors and later her husband
- Sheldon Corthell: Talented stained glass artist; admired by Laura for his elegance, sensitivity, and knowledge and appreciation of high-class music, art, and literature; in and out of Laura’s life throughout the novel; one of Laura’s many suitors
- Landry Court: Young broker’s clerk at Gretry, Converse and Co.; only businessman in the novel who is not ruined by speculating; friend of the Cresslers; one of Laura’s many suitors and later Page’s husband
- Page Dearborn: Laura’s younger sister; often more sensible and mature than Laura; later becomes Landry’s wife
- Charles Cressler: grain dealer at the Chicago Board of Trade; strongly opposed to speculation as he lost a fortune doing it in the past; a second father to Laura and Page; Mrs. Cressler’s husband
- Samuel Gretry: Wheat broker at the Chicago Board of Trade; head of Gretry, Converse and Co., the very wealthy and well-respected brokerage firm that manages Jadwin’s speculating
- Mrs. Cressler: Wife of Charles Cressler; sophisticated and refined; she and her husband are the Dearborn girls' closest friends and watch after them during their time in Chicago
- Mrs. Emily Wessels: Widowed aunt of Laura and Page; agrees to live with and care for the girls in Chicago after their parents' death

== Themes ==
- Love and Selfishness: Throughout the novel, Laura Dearborn struggles with the concept of love. When we first meet her, she is the object of desire of three different suitors and "love[s] to be loved", but insists that she herself will never fall in love. She is torn between her belief that love is something magnificent and wonderful that every woman should strive toward and her conviction that a woman should be happy enough just having a man love her. She is not in love with Jadwin when she marries him, and she has no interest in his life except for where it fits into hers. It is not until the end of the novel when Jadwin is a broken man that Laura is able to surpass her own egotism and begin to genuinely love him. The Laura-Curtis relationship was for Norris a microcosm for all that plagued the American economy, a system in which each person only cares for himself. Both Laura and Curtis were too self-absorbed to acknowledge anyone else’s suffering but their own. To contrast this destructive relationship, the author presents Page and Landry’s marriage as an alternative in which each partner shows concern equally for their own wellbeing and that of the other. Landry teaches Page about the business world, and Page can give Landry insights about art. When discussing relationships, Page says: "I believe in companionship. I believe that between a man and woman that is the great thing – companionship. Love". In response, Landry says: "[I]t might be so, but all depends upon the man and woman. Love . . . is the greatest power in the universe". They practice a healthy communication and share an understanding of what it means to love and an admiration for the power that it brings.
- Powerlessness of Man: Norris demonstrates throughout the novel his belief that man cannot control the world around him. The most obvious example of this in The Pit is embodied by the grain trade. In describing the process of wheat speculation to Laura, Mr. Cressler says : "Think of it, the food of hundreds and hundreds of thousands of people just at the mercy of a few men down there on the Board of Trade. They make the price. They say just how much the peasant shall pay for his loaf of bread. If he can’t pay the price, he simply starves". These poor people’s lives are completely out of their hands. In contrast, Norris suggests that ultimately the men down in the Pit don’t have power over them either. Jadwin attempts to control the forces of nature and "fight . . . against the earth itself" by cornering the market, and he loses his mental and physical health as well as his great fortune as a result. Nature cannot be subjugated by man. It is not until his corner collapses that he is able to see this truth: "The wheat cornered itself. I simply stood between two sets of circumstances. The wheat cornered me, and not I the wheat".
- Business versus Art: Norris suggests that the world is divided by two conflicting forces: business and art. The world of business is embodied by Curtis Jadwin. It is brutal, immoral, hardening, and inherently masculine. Sheldon Corthell represents the world of art. It is a place of beauty, wonder, and elegance and is inherently feminine. The fact that art in the world of The Pit has been reserved for women means that Laura will never love Corthell, for she will always be drawn towards the manhood that Jadwin possesses. These two spheres are very different, but they are still connected. Laura notes, for example, that what makes wealth desirable is that it makes opera and other forms of art possible. Whereas business blinds Jadwin from understanding the literature that Laura shows him, art serves as an escape for Laura from the harsh reality of her husband’s downfall. Instead of confronting his problems, she finds solace in the decorated walls of her home and in trashy love stories about "noble, unselfish people." Corthell, in the same way, flees to Europe when difficulties with Laura arise. By the end of the story we learn that you must have a healthy balance of these two worlds.

== Critical reception ==
Biographer Joseph R. McElrath writes in Frank Norris Revisited that The Pit was widely hailed by its generation’s readers to be “the Great American Novel". Norris succeeded in writing a story that could entertain both popular and more sophisticated audiences. Having appeared just months after Norris' death, critics took the opportunity in reviews of The Pit to mourn the tragic loss of the great "American Zola," so the novel received much more attention than any of the work that came before it.

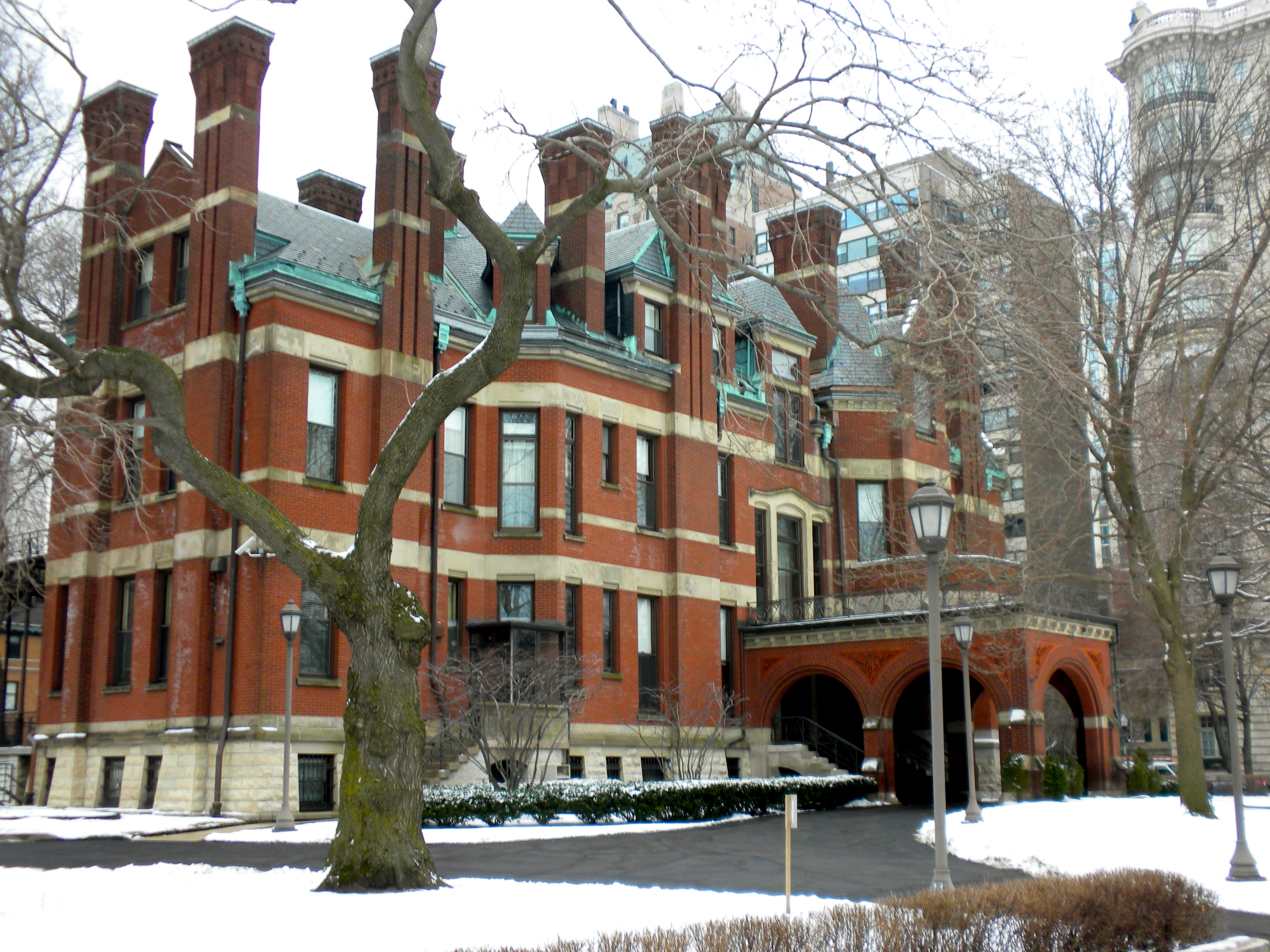
House on North Avenue appearing in the novel

Of all the known reviews of written of Norris' work through 1914, one-third of them are about The Pit. The New York Herald went so far as to say that "in The Pit [sic] he is more the prophet of a new dispensation" and "becomes distinctly the founder of a new school, which may preclude a French Norris". Though the majority of reviewers praised the novel, there were still an unsatisfied few who criticized Norris' hurried writing and his storyline’s lack of insight and originality.

Over time critics have come to agree more with the latter reviewers' interpretation of The Pit, and many today regard it as one of Norris' weaker works. Often identified as The Pit’s main flaw is the love plot that centers on Laura and Curtis Jadwin’s marital troubles. Proponents of this view argue that the tumultuous Laura-Jadwin relationship does not synthesize well with the other business plot of the story and that it ultimately detracts from the novel’s structural and thematic cohesion. Donald Pizer highlights as the source of The Pit’s overall disjointedness the fact that the two plots have very different themes and symbols that do not seem to relate. Of the novel he writes:

its major symbols, those involving the wheat and the pit, are present only in the business plot. An entirely different group of symbols appears in the love story. Norris uses three violent and sensational symbols for the pit. It is a whirlpool, a military battleground, and an arena for the combat of enraged animals (bulls and bears). . . . The symbolism in the love story is more subtle. Laura’s artistic tastes, her dramatic roles, and her huge prison of a house constitute a rich symbolic key to her character and to her conflicts.

Many scholars in the field, including Pizer, contend that The Pit is far outshined by its predecessors McTeague and The Octopus.

== Sales ==
The Pit had already sold 20,000 copies a month prior to its publication. During its first year alone, a total of 95,914 books had been bought, making it the third most successful book of 1903. The Publishers' Weekly consistently cited the novel as the "best-selling book in the United States" throughout that year, and advertised it as one of a select few "[b]ooks with blood in their veins". By 1932, nearly 200,000 copies had been sold. The Pit was first published in serial form in the Saturday Evening Post magazine from September 1902 through January 1903. Doubleday, Page, & Company issued the story in book form for the first time in early January 1903. The novel had already gone through five editions only one month after it appeared in stores, and by mid-February it was being sold in Canada, Australia, and England. Doubleday, Page was forced to create a second set of typesetting plates in 1928 after the originals had been worn out. Despite its huge initial success, however, The Pit's popularity was not sustained by the next generations of readers.

== Adaptations ==
=== Theater ===
Following its great success Norris' story was rewritten for both stage and screen. On February 10, 1904, The Pit, an original play adapted from the book by Channing Pollock and produced by William A. Brady, opened in the Lyric Theater on Broadway. The original Broadway cast starred Wilton Lackaye as Curtis Jadwin. The New York Times expressed mixed opinions of the four-act drama in an article titled “'The Pit' – 'Tis Pitty; And Pity 'Tis, 'Tis True That Wilton Lackaye Scores". The show closed in April of that year after 77 performances.

=== Film ===
A Corner in Wheat, director D.W. Griffith's silent film version of the book, appeared in 1909. It was adapted for the screen by Griffith and screenwriter Frank E. Woods. An anti-monopoly social commentary, the movie tells the story of a greedy commodities gambler who corners the wheat market and consequently forces poverty onto all those who can no longer afford to buy bread. The film stars Frank Powell as the wheat king and James Kirkwood as the poor farmer.

=== Board Games ===
Norris' compelling portrayal of the Chicago Board of Trade also inspired the creation of Pit: Exciting Fun for Everyone, a card game by Parker Brothers, in 1904. The game includes 65 playing cards on which either a bull, a bear, or one of seven different commodities available for exchange (corn, barley, wheat, rye, flax, hay, or oats) is pictured. It simulates the nonstop action of an actual trading pit by challenging players to corner the market by collecting all nine cards of one commodity. The game was remastered and released again in 1964 by the name Pit: The World’s Liveliest Trading Game. In 2004, a 100th anniversary edition of Pit was released with two decks of commodities cards – one featuring the original seven commodities and another featuring modern commodities like gold, oil, cocoa, and platinum.

== Inspiration and legacy ==
The plot-line that follows Curtis Jadwin’s exploits in wheat speculation and attempt to corner the market was inspired by the true story of Bull trader Joseph Leiter. Norris learned of the Joseph Leiter Wheat corner of 1897-98 upon visiting Chicago in 1901. For a short period of time, Leiter was the largest individual holder of wheat in the history of the grain trade. Leiter lost an estimated 10 million dollars when the market crashed in 1898. The ups and downs of the Chicago wheat pit in the novel follow the pattern of Leiter’s market. Both first purchased wheat in April 1897 and both corners collapsed on Monday, June 13, 1898.

Though Norris' contemporaries believed The Pit to be his literary masterpiece, opinions of the book have changed over time. During the 1950s and 60s, focus shifted to The Octopus as readers hailed this 1901 novel as an American classic. Since the 1970s, critics have regarded McTeague (1899) as Norris' greatest work. Biographer Joseph R. McElrath reveals in Frank Norris: A Life that McTeague was one of the less successful books of Norris' lifetime and that the author himself considered The Octopus to be a better work of art.

The story that was released serially in the Saturday Evening Post was titled The Pit: A Romance of Chicago and was significantly shorter than that of the published book. Many descriptive passages and much of the "Conclusion" were cut out by Norris and the magazine’s editors to better appeal to the Post’s readership. The version produced by Doubleday, Page is the full novel as Norris intended it to be read.
