= The Octopus: A Story of California =

1901 novel by Frank Norris

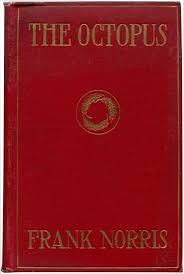
- First edition
- Author: Frank Norris
- Language: English
- Series: Epic of Wheat trilogy
- Genre: Novel
- Publisher: Doubleday, Page
- Publication date: 1901
- Publication place: United States
- Media type: Print (hardback and paperback)
- OCLC: 244815
- Followed by: The Pit

The Octopus: A Story of California is a 1901 novel by Frank Norris and was the first part of an uncompleted trilogy, The Epic of the Wheat. It describes the wheat industry in California, and the conflicts between wheat growers and a railway company. Norris was inspired to write the novel by the Mussel Slough Tragedy involving the Southern Pacific Railroad. In the novel he depicts the tensions between the railroad, the ranchers and the ranchers' League. The book emphasized the control of "forces", such as the power of railroad monopolies, over individuals. Some editions of the work give the subtitle as A California Story.

== Origins ==
Following the release and subsequent success of Norris' 1899 McTeague, he began searching for an idea for his next project. Within a few weeks he had formulated his idea for a trilogy of novels on the topic of wheat, his 'Epic of the Wheat', from its growth in California (which would be the basis of The Octopus), to its distribution in Chicago (The Pit, published posthumously in 1903), to its consumption in a famished region of Europe or Asia (intended to be titled The Wolf, although never begun before his death).

The Octopus itself was based on the Mussel Slough Tragedy of 1880, which involved a bloody conflict between ranchers and law agents defending the Southern Pacific Railroad. The central issue was over the ownership of the ranches, which the farmers had leased from the railroad nearly ten years earlier with intentions of eventually purchasing the land. Although originally priced at $2.50 to $5 per acre, the railroad eventually opened the land for sale at prices adjusted for land improvements, leading to the conflict depicted in the book.

Norris decided upon the project in March 1899, and by early April had left for California to research the project. Over the following months, he visited the locations of the incident and worked on nearby farms, gaining firsthand knowledge of the wheat farmer’s life.

He returned to New York that fall, and between January and December 1900 wrote the manuscript for The Octopus, which was published the following April with substantial success.

One of the main characters in the novel is an unscrupulous railroad magnate named Shelgrim, modeled upon Collis Potter Huntington, president of the powerful Southern Pacific Railroad. The late Professor Donald Pizer remarked on Norris's portrayal of Huntington: "My own reading of the conclusion of The Octopus is that Norris was responsive to the personal power and philanthropy of Huntington but that he also recognized the sophistry of Huntington’s defense of railroad practices on the basis that they were inseparable from natural processes, a view that later came to be called Social Darwinism."

== Synopsis ==
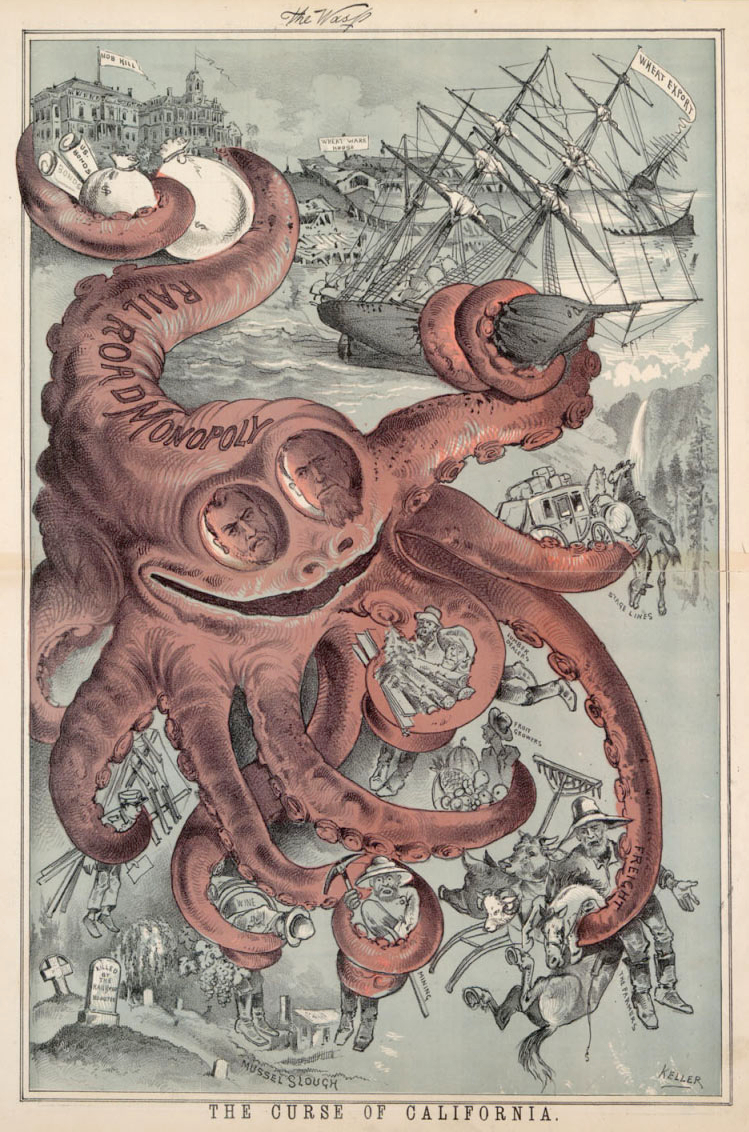
G. Frederick Keller's "The Curse of California," which appeared in The Wasp on August 19, 1882, is the likely origin of the depiction of the Southern Pacific Railroad monopoly as an octopus.

The Octopus depicts the conflict between wheat farmers in the southern San Joaquin Valley and the fictional Pacific and Southwestern railroad (P&SW). The main nearby town is the fictional Bonneville.

The railroad attempts to take possession of the land the farmers have been improving for many years, forcing them to defend themselves. The wheat farmers are represented by Magnus Derrick, the reluctant leader of the ad hoc farmers' League designed to fight for the retention of their land and low-cost freight rates. S. Behrman serves as the local representative of P&SW. Presley, a young guest of the Derricks, writes 'The Toilers,' a wildly popular poem.

The league persuades Derrick to participate in secretly bribing state legislators and installing Derrick's lawyer son, Lyman, on the railroad board. However, all goes for naught, as the railroads have secretly agreed to support Lyman's bid for governor. Lyman, violating his promise to the league, declines to reduce tariffs for Tulare County wheat.

Dyke, a railroad engineer, dotes on his daughter, Sidney, and his mother. Dyke is fired for refusing to take a pay cut. He decides to raise hops but is ruined when the railroad raises the tariff for shipping them. After robbing a train, he eludes capture but is eventually caught.

When the community comes together to drive jackrabbits from Osterman's ranch, Behrman, Delaney, and Christian—railroad agents—assisted by U.S. marshals, seize Annixter's ranch. Members of the league ride off to thwart the seizure of Derrick's ranch. In the gunfight that ensues, Osterman, Broderson, Harran Derrick (Magnus' son), Hooven, and Annixter are all instantly killed or mortally wounded. Shortly afterward, Annixter's young widow, Hilma, suffers a miscarriage. Presley, the poet, throws a bomb made by the Anarchist bar owner Caraher into Behrman's home, but Behrman escapes unscathed.

Other league members counsel caution in a meeting at the Bonneville Opera House. Derrick arrives and is about to speak when provocateurs distribute freshly printed copies of the local newspaper. A front-page story reveals Derrick's participation in the league's bribery, ruining Derrick.

Dyke is tried and sentenced to life in prison.

Mrs. Hooven and her daughters, 19-year-old Minna and 6-year-old Hilda, move to San Francisco, where they become separated and destitute. Minna is lured into prostitution and Mrs. Hooven dies of starvation. Presley, determined to help them, arrives too late.

In San Francisco, Presley attends a sumptuous dinner, courtesy of his businessman friend Cedarquist, who secures Presley passage on an India-bound ship. Cedarquist's wife, moved by Presley's poem 'The Toilers,' raises money to send a shipload of wheat for famine relief to India.

Behrman, now in possession of Derrick's farm, harvests the wheat Derrick raised and sells it to Mrs. Cedarquist's famine-relief effort. He goes to Port Costa to see the wheat from his grain elevator loaded on the India-bound Swanhilda. While relishing the sight of the wheat cascading into the ship's hold, he trips and falls in, where the wheat buries him. Later, Presley, on board the same ship, watches the California coast receding from view.

== Characters ==
Presley – A poet searching for a plot, as well as a surveyor of the dilemma between the ranchers and the railroad. The novel begins with him, riding his bicycle across the countryside, and ends with him as well. He lives on Los Muertos with the Derricks as a friend of the family. The character appears to parallel the author, with Presley’s search for a 'Song of the West' being comparable to Norris' 'Epic of the Wheat'. Presley later discards his grand ideas and publishes 'The Toilers', a poem about the farmer’s plight which stirs up public interest in the issue.

Magnus Derrick – Owner of El Rancho de los Muertos and the father of Harran and Lyman Derrick, Magnus is a character who represents the integrity of previous generations, in contrast to what the novel portrays as the dishonest dealings of younger people, as represented by the railroad and the ranchers' League, which Magnus leads.

Harran Derrick – Son of Magnus, Harran aids his father on the ranch. It is Harran who persuades Magnus to head the League. Along with his father he is part of the inner circle of the ranchers' League.

Lyman Derrick – Son of Magnus, Lyman is a lawyer in San Francisco up north. Lyman is contracted by the League to represent the farmers on the state Railroad Commission, which decides on transport rates.

Annixter – Owner and operator of the Quien Sabe Rancho, Annixter is a young, headstrong confirmed bachelor who, over the course of the novel, matures into a soft-hearted, selfless man, largely due to his developing interest in Hilma Tree. Part of the inner circle of the League.

Vanamee – Long-time friend of Presley, Vanamee is a wanderer haunted by the tragic, violent death of a love interest, Angele Varian, years before. In the novel he works on different ranches and spends a great deal of time at the Mission San Juan de Guadalajara, where Angele had been murdered. The novel compares Vanamee to biblical prophets, as he has a strong spiritual aspect.

S. Behrman – In addition to being a banker, real estate agent, and a political boss, S. Behrman is vilified by his representation of the railroad. As such, he is despised by the ranchers.

Other important characters include Hilma Tree, Hooven, Broderson, Osterman, Dyke, Cedarquist, Delaney, Annie Derrick, and Father Sarria.

== Critical reception ==
The Saturday Review of Literature said of Norris' work:

"The Octopus" is a novel of crude and almost barbaric force; showing in many parts the deep impress of Zola both in method and manner, but disclosing also great vigour of imagination, dramatic feeling and a deep sense of reality.

It was common to classify Norris as a literary naturalist who had patterned his writing after the 19th-century French novelist. Norris was sometimes proclaimed "the American Zola".

A review in The Athenaeum magazine of the 1901 British edition of The Octopus (from publisher Grant Richards) called the novel:

a powerfully visualized picture of the evils wrought by monopolies or "trusts." In this case the monopoly is a railway, its prey the wheat-growers and other producers in California. ... If it be true that it is not wisely described as an epic, it is equally true that it is a powerful and tragic piece of fiction.

Over a century later, while reviewing a new Frank Norris biography by Joseph McElrath Jr. and Jesse Crisler, Victor Davis Hansen termed The Octopus a "populist icon" and associated its "exposé of railroad greed and perfidy" with Upton Sinclair's The Jungle (1906) as "twin classics in the muckraking tradition of American letters."

== Legacy ==
The conclusion of The Octopus inspired D. W. Griffith's 1909 film A Corner in Wheat, in which the magnate, after cornering the market in wheat, falls into a grain elevator and dies.

Classics Illustrated adapted the Norris story for its January 1960 issue #159, with art by Gray Morrow and George Evans, and a cover drawn by L.B. Cole.
