= U.S. Futures Exchange =

Defunct American futures exchange

U.S. Futures Exchange (USFE) was a Chicago-based, electronic futures exchange that terminated all exchange operations on December 31, 2008. On December 17, 2008, MF Global had announced USFE was for sale or would be closed by December 31, 2008. USFE was originally Eurex US who bought BrokerTec, but applied and received its own futures exchange license from the U.S. Commodity Futures Trading Commission. In October 2006, Man Group bought a majority share of Eurex US and rebranded the exchange U.S. Futures Exchange. It has been working to release a set of new products under a strategy of bringing innovation to the more than century-old derivatives business. The chief executive officer was John Spiegel.

== Products ==
On September 3, 2008, USFE announced an exclusive licensing agreement with Deutsche Börse to launch a mini-sized U.S. dollar-denominated DAX(R) futures contract to be launched October 1, 2008. The new contract carried a $10 multiplier, enabling U.S. futures traders access to a leading German stock market index without currency exposure.

On April 18, 2007, USFE launched its first contracts since its rebranding. The first was a Binary Event Future on whether the Chicago Mercantile Exchange would successfully purchase the Chicago Board of Trade. The second was similar except on whether the Intercontinental Exchange would purchase the Chicago Board of Trade. A binary event future settles to 100 if the event occurs and 0 if the event does not occur. The CME-CBOT contract settled on July 13, 2007, to 100 when the Chicago Mercantile Exchange and the Chicago Board of Trade completed a merger and became the CME Group.

On March 14, 2007, USFE announced plans to launch futures based on ISE indexes, including the Homebuilders, Gold, SINdex, Revere Natural Gas, and Water Indexes. USFE also announced an exclusive deal with Morningstar to list futures based on their 16 capitalization and style-based indexes on May 23, 2007. On June 28, 2007, USFE announced it would launch a series of renewable energy futures starting with on NORDIX Financial Wind Index futures in seven distinct U.S. regions. All of these futures were due to be released in Q4 of 2007.

On September 21, 2007, USFE announced that it would begin trading Spot Equivalent foreign exchange futures on a 23-hour basis. Spot Equivalent Futures are futures which pay out basis nightly so that the futures contract will price the same as a spot contract in the foreign exchange market. However, at the same time, it would trade on a transparent, regulated exchange. The first contracts included Euro (EUR/USD), British pound (GBP/USD), Japanese yen (USD/JPY), Australian Dollar (AUD/USD), Swiss Franc (USD/CHF), and Canadian Dollar (USD/CAD).

== Trading platform ==
USFE was a fully electronic exchange. Its last platform release, USFE 1.0, was based on Eurex 8.0 developed by Deutsche Börse Systems with an additional market allocation algorithm to incentivize liquidity providers. USFE used the Eurex network backbone to provide connectivity worldwide.
