= The Epic of the Wheat =

Book series by Frank Norris

The Epic of the Wheat was a planned trilogy by American author Frank Norris. Two of the three works were published, but the third was not written at the time of Norris' death.

Following his 1899 success McTeague, Norris formulated his idea for a trilogy of novels on the topic of wheat, his Epic of the Wheat, from its growth in California in The Octopus, to its distribution via Chicago in his posthumously published 1903 work The Pit, to its consumption in a famished region of Europe in The Wolf. He had not begun writing The Wolf before his death.

== Works ==
=== The Octopus: A Story of California ===
The Octopus depicts the conflict between wheat farmers in the San Joaquin Valley and the fictional Pacific and Southwestern Railroad (P. & S. W.). The railroad attempts to take possession of the land the farmers have been improving for many years, forcing them to defend themselves. The wheat farmers are represented by Magnus Derrick, the reluctant leader of the ad hoc farmer's League designed to fight for retention of their land and low cost freight rates. S. Behrman serves as the local representative of P. & S. W. In his attempt at writing his great epic poem, Presley witnesses the disintegration of Annixter, Derrick, Hooven, and their families.

=== The Pit: A Story of Chicago ===
The plot revolves around Laura Dearborn, a young woman being courted by three men: Curtis Jadwin, Sheldon Corthell, and Landry Court. She married Jadwin, who over time loses interest in her as he gets more involved in wheat speculation at the Chicago Board of Trade. As his risky investments start to lead him to ruin, Laura reunites with Corthell, but she eventually rebuffs him. Jadwin's fortunes turn as he is able to corner the market and ruin even good friends, but in time his luck runs out, and he is ruined. He turns his attention back to his wife, and they leave Chicago, heading West to start fresh.

=== The Wolf: A Story of Europe ===
Norris planned for the conclusion to revolve around the consumption of wheat in a part of Europe experiencing a famine. Though he had decided on the title and some general ideas, he did not begin work in earnest before he died unexpectedly in October, 1902 from peritonitis, leaving his proposed third book of the trilogy, The Wolf: A Story of Europe, unwritten.
