= Oregon History (mural) =

Mural in Portland, Oregon, U.S.

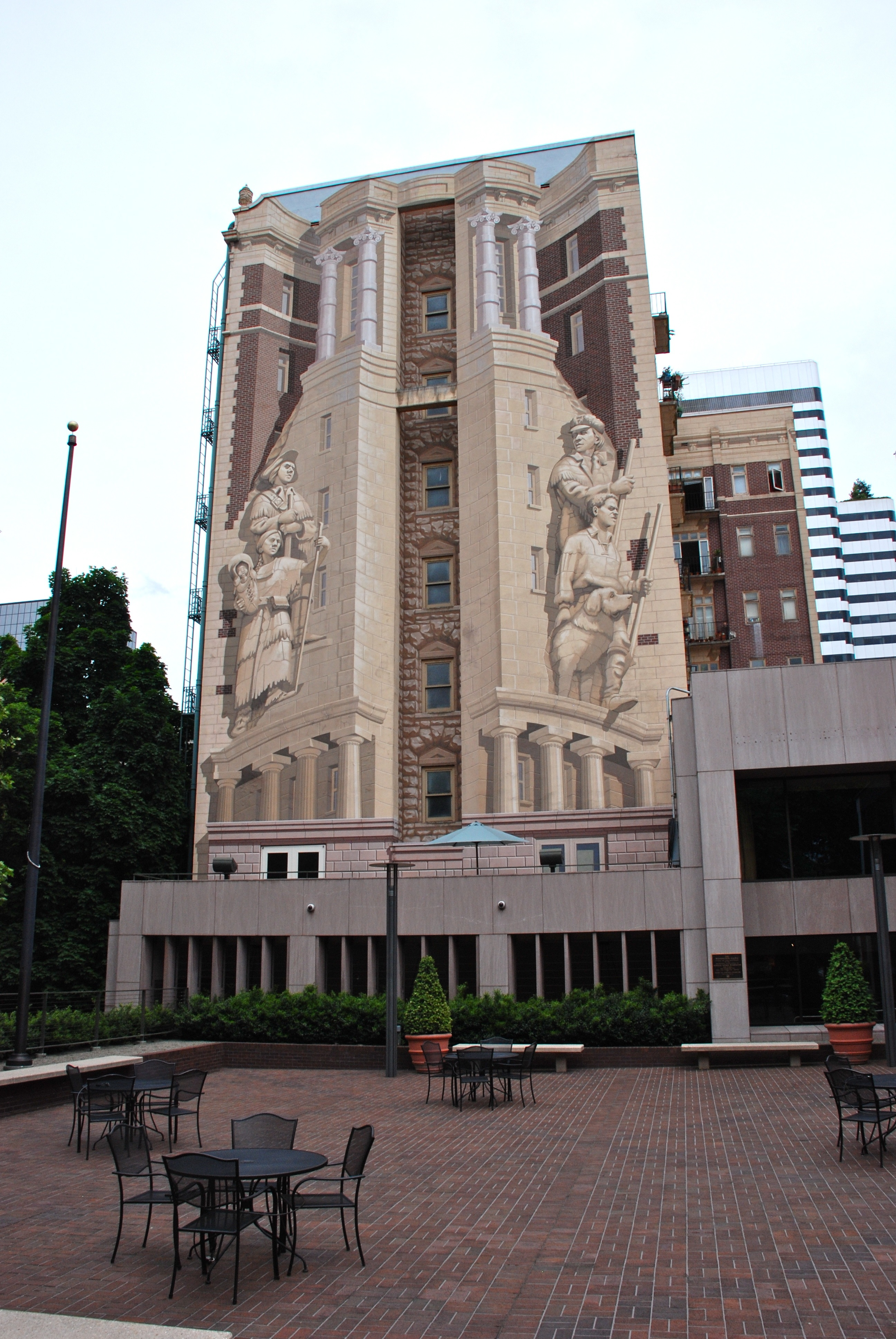
- The mural on the west side of the Sovereign Hotel, 2014
- Artist: Richard Haas
- Type: Mural
- Location: Portland, Oregon, United States; 45.516026°N 122.682025°W

Oregon History, sometimes called the Oregon Historical Society mural, is a pair of eight-story-tall 1989–1990 trompe-l'œil murals by Richard Haas, installed outside the Oregon Historical Society, on two sides of the Sovereign Hotel building in Portland, Oregon, in the United States.

== Description ==
The murals depict people and scenes from Oregon's history, including John Jacob Astor, wagons trains, and figures associated with the Lewis and Clark Expedition, including Meriwether Lewis, William Clark, Sacagawea and her child, the African slave York, and the Newfoundland dog Seaman.

== History ==
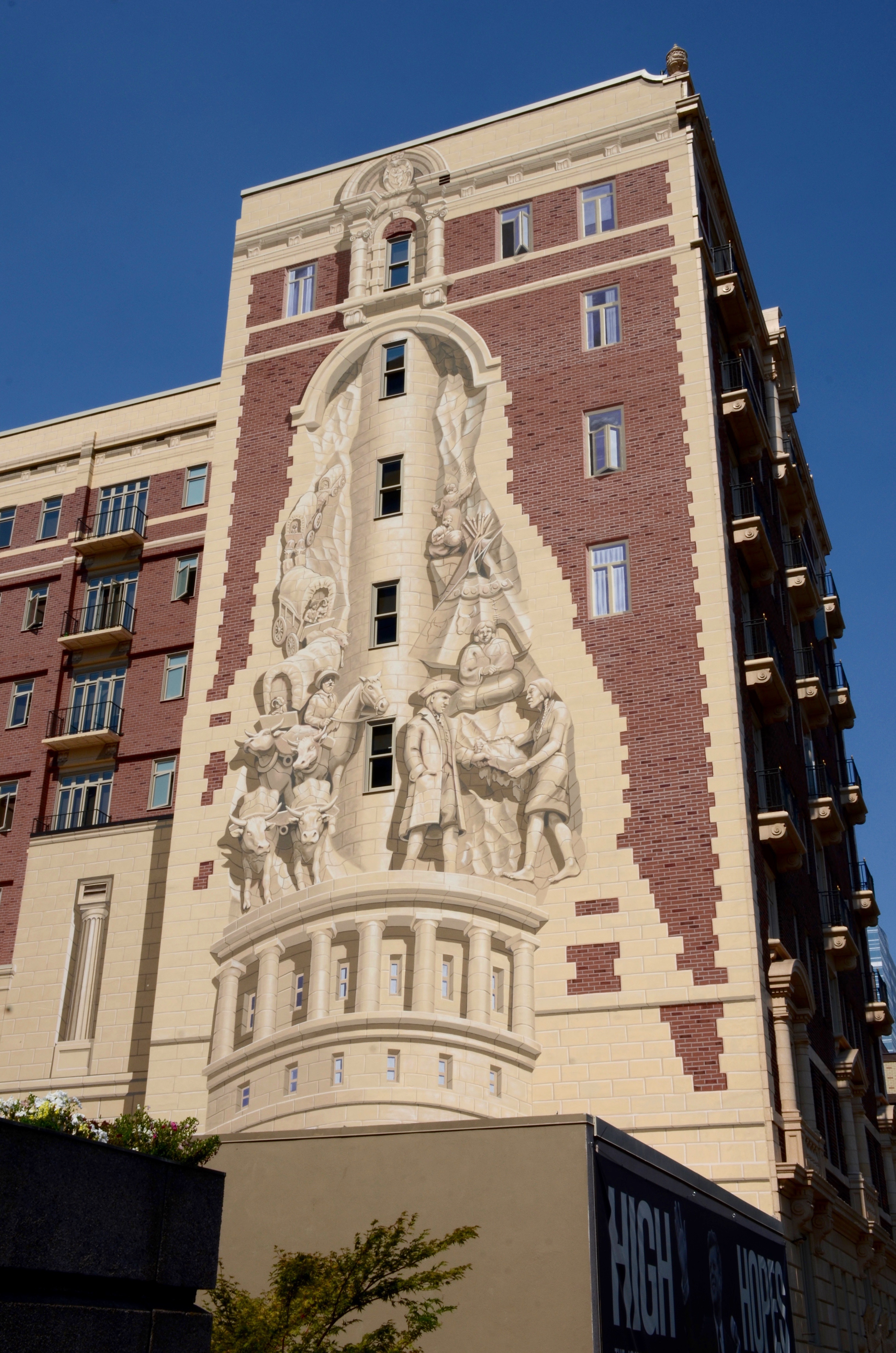
The mural on the building's south side features a wagon train and scenes from the fur trade and Native American life.

The historical society commissioned the artwork in 1989 for $225,000.

The Oregon Historical Society sold the Sovereign Hotel in 2014. In 2016, the hotel building underwent major renovations. The sales agreement required restoration of the murals to their original condition following building renovations. The murals were painted-out at that time, but in summer 2016 they were newly repainted, replicating the originals. The new copies were officially dedicated in May 2017.
