= Life's Whirlpool (1916 film) =

1916 film by Barry O'Neil

Life's Whirlpool (McTeague)
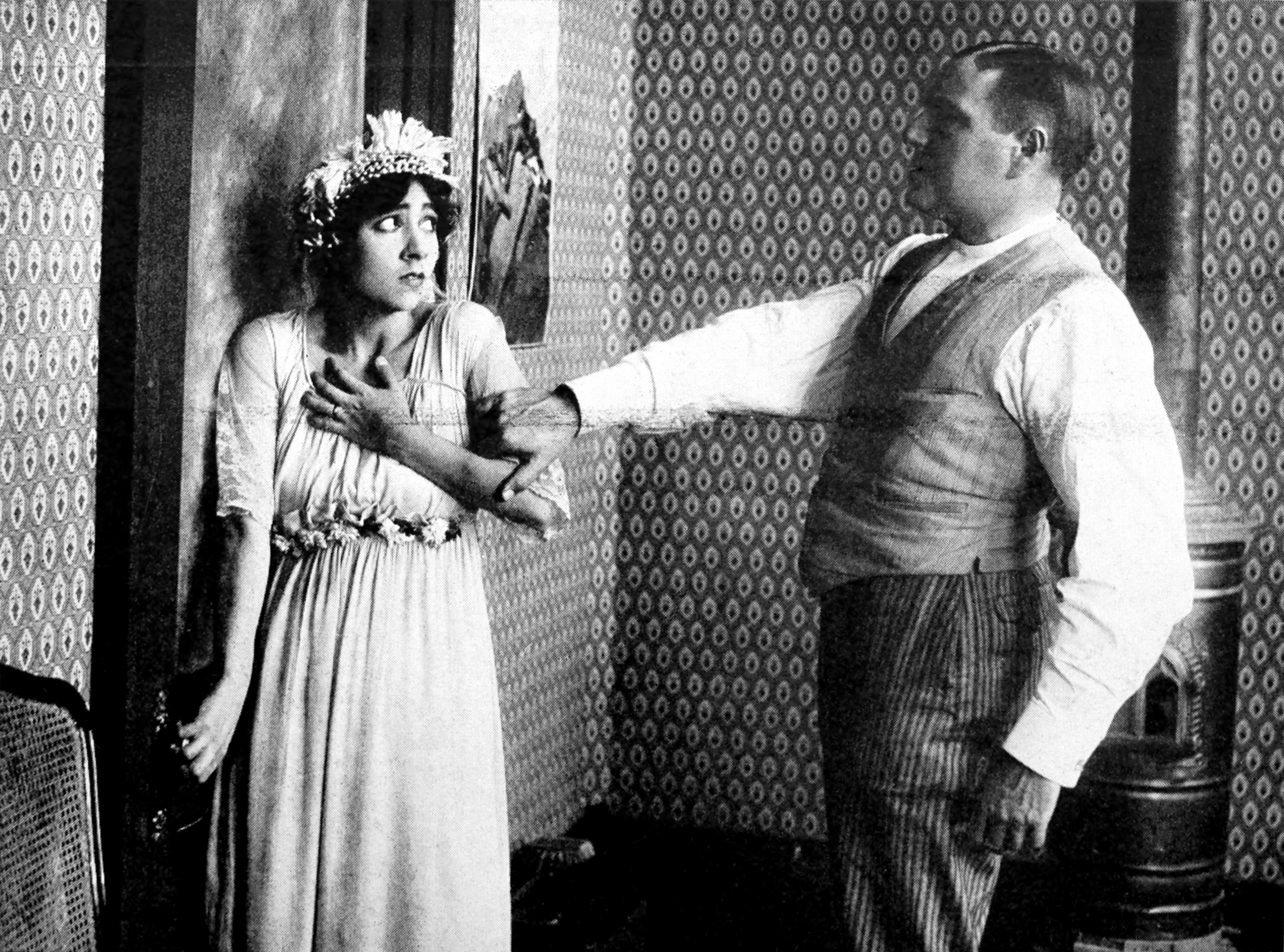
- Film still of Fania Marinoff and Holbrook Blinn
- Directed by: Barry O'Neil
- Written by: Barry O'Neil (scenario); E. Magnus Ingleton (scenario)
- Based on: Frank Norris (novel)
- Produced by: William A. Brady (as William A. Brady Picture Plays)
- Starring: Holbrook Blinn; Fania Marinoff
- Distributed by: World Film Company
- Release date: January 10, 1916
- Running time: 5 reels
- Country: United States
- Languages: Silent film (English intertitles)

Life's Whirlpool (also known as McTeague) is a 1916 American silent film drama directed by Barry O'Neil. The first motion picture adaptation of Frank Norris's 1899 novel McTeague, the film stars Holbrook Blinn and Fania Marinoff as McTeague and Trina. These roles later were played by Gibson Gowland and Zasu Pitts in Eric von Stroheim's 1924 adaptation Greed. Blinn was famous for playing brutal characters on the stage, as in the Edward Sheldon play Salvation Nell (1908).

The film is considered a lost film.

== Cast ==
- Holbrook Blinn as McTeague
- Fania Marinoff as Trina
- Walter Green as Marcus Schuller
- Philip Robson as Mr. Sieppe
- Julia Stuart as Mrs. Sieppe
- Rosemary Dean as Selina Sieppe
- Eleanor Blanchard as Maria Cappa

== See also ==
- List of lost films
