= Nedra (film) =

1915 film

- Directed by: Edward José
- Written by: George B. Seitz
- Based on: novel Nedra by George Barr McCutcheon c.1905
- Produced by: Gold Rooster Plays
- Distributed by: Pathé Exchange
- Release date: November 12, 1915
- Running time: 5 reels
- Country: USA
- Language: Silent...English intertitles

Nedra is a lost 1915 silent film directed by Edward José and starring Fania Marinoff. It was produced and distributed by Pathé Exchange.

== Cast ==
- George Probert - Hugh Ridgway
- Fania Marinoff - Lady Tenny
- Margaret Greene - Grace Vernon
- Crauford Kent - Henry Veath
