= Blind Husbands =

1919 film directed by Erich von Stroheim

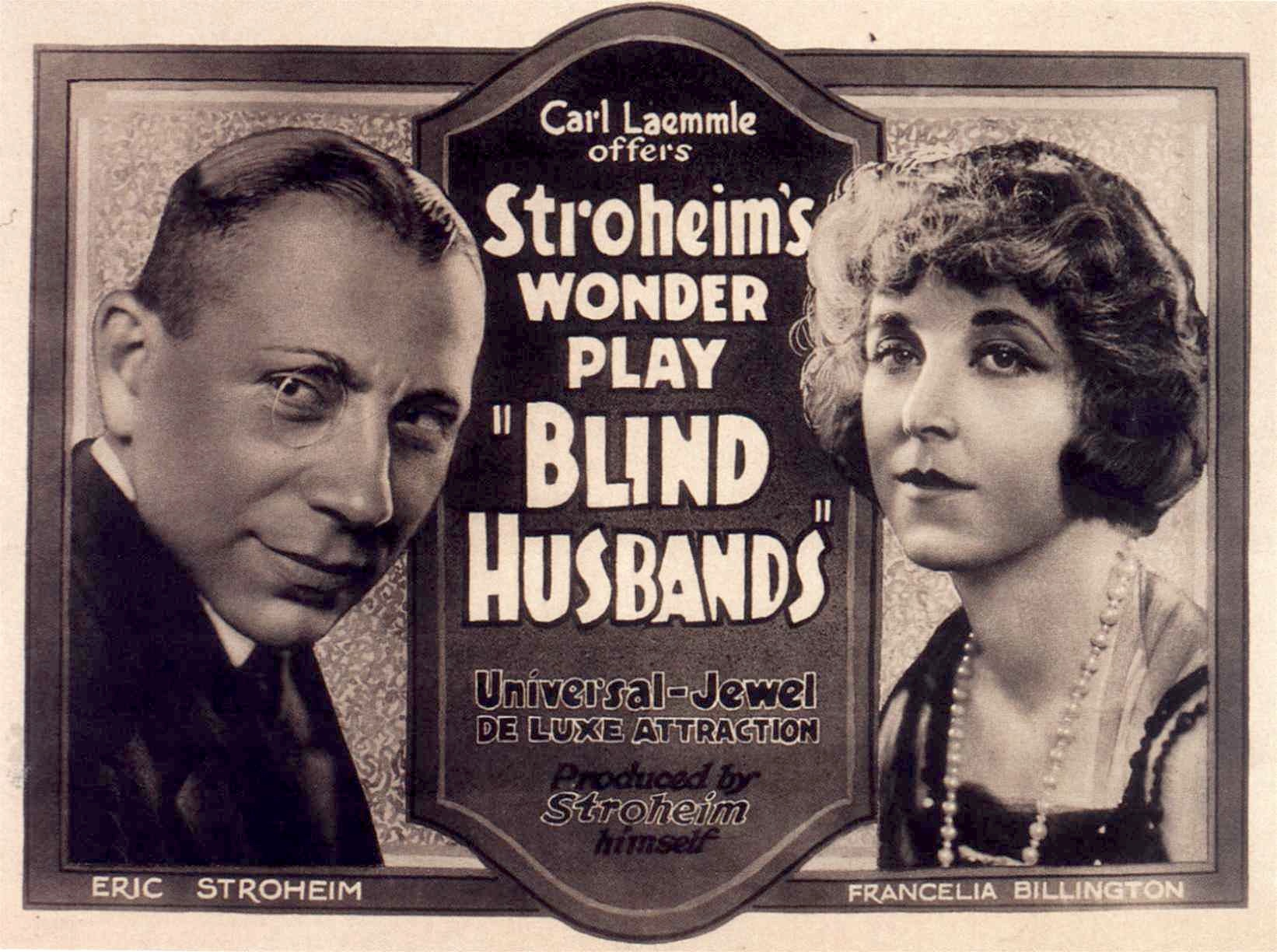
- Film poster
- Directed by: Erich von Stroheim
- Written by: Erich von Stroheim
- Produced by: Erich von Stroheim
- Starring: Sam De Grasse; Francelia Billington; Erich von Stroheim; Gibson Gowland
- Cinematography: Ben F. Reynolds
- Edited by: Eleanor Fried; Frank Lawrence; Viola Mallory; Erich von Stroheim; Grant Whytock
- Distributed by: Universal Film Manufacturing Company
- Release date: December 7, 1919
- Running time: 91 minutes
- Country: United States
- Language: Silent (English intertitles)
- Budget: $42,000

Blind Husbands

Blind Husbands is a 1919 American silent drama film written and directed by Erich von Stroheim. The film is an adaptation of the story The Pinnacle by Stroheim.

== Plot ==
A group of holiday-makers arrives at Cortina d'Ampezzo, an Alpine village in the Dolomites. Among them are an American Doctor who does not pay much attention to his wife and an Austrian Lieutenant, who decides to seduce her. He manages to befriend the couple so that, when the Doctor has to leave to help a local physician, he asks the Lieutenant to look after his wife. When the Lieutenant becomes too pressing, she promises to leave with him but asks him to give her more time. During the night, she puts a letter under the door of his bedroom.

The Doctor goes on a climbing expedition with the Lieutenant, who has been bragging about his exploits as a mountaineer. In fact, he is not in very good shape and the Doctor must help him to reach the summit. In the process, the Doctor finds his wife's letter in the pocket of the Lieutenant's jacket, but before he can read it, the Lieutenant throws it away. He asks the Lieutenant whether his wife had promised to leave with him and the Lieutenant gives a positive answer. The Doctor decides to leave him on the summit and starts his descent, despite the Lieutenant now saying that he has been lying because he thought the Doctor would not believe the truth. On his way back, the Doctor finds his wife's letter, in which she had written that she loved only her husband, and asked the Lieutenant not to bother her any longer with his attentions. While pondering whether he should go back to get the Lieutenant, he loses his balance and falls down. When the Doctor is finally saved by soldiers, he asks them to go and help the Lieutenant. Before they can reach him, the Lieutenant, scared by a staring vulture, falls to his death from the precipice.

== Cast ==
- Sam De Grasse as Doctor Robert Armstrong, the husband
- Francelia Billington as Margaret Armstrong, the wife
- Erich von Stroheim as Lieutenant Eric Von Steuben
- Gibson Gowland as Silent Sepp, the mountain guide
- Fay Holderness as The jealous waitress
- Ruby Kendrick as A village blossom
- Valerie Germonprez as The honeymooning bride
- Jack Perrin as The honeymooning groom
- Richard Cummings as Dr. Brunner, the village physician
- Louis Fitzroy as The village priest
- William De Vaull as A man from home
- Jack Mathes as A man from home
- Percy Challenger as A man from home

== Pre-Production ==
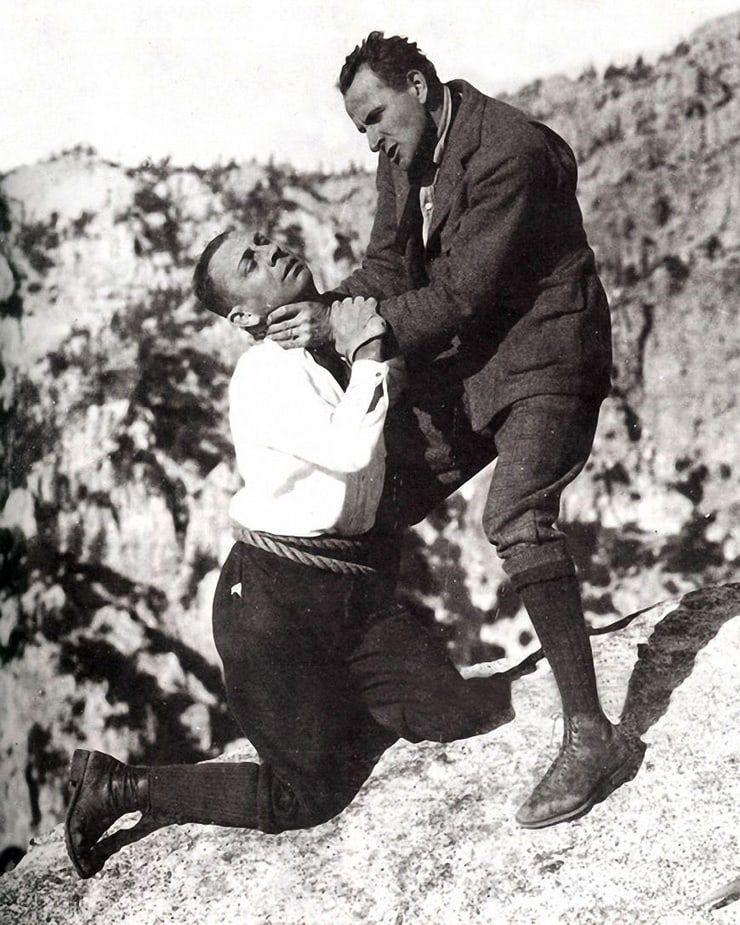
Erich von Stroheim (as Lieutenant Eric Von Steuben) and Sam De Grasse (as Doctor Robert Armstrong) struggle in the film's climax

At the peak of the Spanish influenza in late 1918, von Stroheim attempted to interest film studios in his script-in-progress entitled The Pinnacle, concerning an American couple and an Austrian Lieutenant in a ménage à trois.

He decided his best prospect for funding would be Carl Laemmle at Universal Studios, where von Stroheim had recently completed the profitable The Heart of Humanity. Laemmle, of German birth and ethnicity, was known to hire German-speaking countrymen, an important consideration for von Stroheim when post-war “anti-German hysteria” briefly persisted in the United States. Unlike other established studios such as Paramount and First National Pictures that often produced elaborate and expensive features with top-rank stars, Laemmle's vast Universal operation churned out relatively low-budget movies and offered parsimonious contracts for its actors and technicians, ensuring a high turnover.

Considering Universal's frequent need for experienced staff, Von Stroheim approached Laemmle confident that he could enlist the producer in the project with two enticements: von Stroheim would hand over the story and script, gratis, and waive all wages for directing the picture. The only caveat was $200 per week to star in the film. After a short, intense interview, von Stroheim won the support of the movie mogul. The budget for the film was initially estimated at $25,000, and von Stroheim immediately began casting the production for The Pinnacle on 3 April 1919.

== Production ==
Like Griffith, von Stroheim was averse to hiring theater-trained actors and established screen “stars”, preferring to assemble a stock company from “untrained talent” whom he would mentor to achieve his cinematic goals. Actors Francelia Billington and Sam de Grasse would play the American couple on vacation in the Dolomite Alps, both who had been Mutual players. British actor Gibson Gowland would play the mountain guide, Silent Sepp Innerkofler, and later star as McTeague in von Stroheim's Greed (1924). Von Stroheim played the meddling lover Lieutenant Eric Von Steuben.

An indication of Laemmle's determination to ensure a commercially impressive production, he provided von Stroheim with their top cinematographer Ben Reynolds, and assistant William Daniels. Both would serve with the director until he moved to Metro-Goldwyn-Mayer in 1924, when only Daniels accompanied him.

By the time shooting of Blind Husbands was completed on 12 June 1919, the costs had far exceeded the initial budget estimate. Combined film stock and advertising expenses had reached over $250,000. As such, Blind Husbands emerged as a critically important project. Universal's response was to deepen its commitment to the success of the production.

Promotional articles were planted in movie magazines that were careful to counter any residual anti-German prejudices. Von Stroheim's personal character was praised and readers were reminded of his American citizenship—a citizenship he would not possess for almost seven years. Press releases assured moviegoers that he had relinquished his royal title of Count and dropped the nobiliary particle “von” .

The methods von Stroheim used to extract impressive performances from his actors were effective, but they required immense amounts of raw footage. Key scenes were performed and re-performed again and again until an “ideal” was provoked, often at the price of frustrating the cast and crew. Von Stroheim was then confronted with the task of sifting through this dross-like footage to discover the gems he had elicited on the set.

By mid-summer studio executives, wishing to expedite its release, submitted the partially edited footage to Grant Whytock, who prepared the final cut for distribution. Universal was sanguine about the prospects for a commercially and critically successful film. A press screening elicited fulsome praise for Blind Husbands and director von Stroheim, including one accolade that anointed him “a direct descendant of [D.W] Griffith.”

When the completed film was delivered to Universal's New York City sales department to arrange distribution in August 1919, Universal's vice-president, R. H. Cochrane, emphatically rejected the title of the film The Pinnacle. (n.b. The movie's climax and denouement occur at the top of an alpine peak). Film titles, then strictly within the domain of sales and exhibition personnel, initiated a search for a new title. Von Stroheim, outraged, placed a full-page protest in Motion Picture News, without effect. Blind Husbands opened at Washington's Rialto Theater on 19 October 1919.

== Critical response ==
“Until the coming of Orson Welles, Blind Husbands was the most impressive and significant debut film in Hollywood history.”—Film historian Richard Koszarski, 1983

In an effort to maximize anticipated profits for Blind Husbands, Universal launched a massive promotional campaign. Nationwide, the picture grossed over $325,000 in receipts during its first year when typical five-reel feature films averaged $55,000.

“ Blind Husbands is an apprentice work, exasperating in its infantile narcissism, its unleashing of the director’s wish-fulfillment fantasies. But it launched a career that was soon to emerge as one of the most brilliant in pictures.” —Biographer Charles Higham, in The Art of the American Film (1973).

Universal's productions, which usually exhibited in less exalted venues, arranged for Blind Husbands to run at New York's “palatial” Capitol Theater though this required a months-long delay. Blind Husbands inspired fulsome responses from American film critics and “almost without exception” both the director and his cinematic creation were hailed as an advance for the art form.

Agnes Smith of the New York Telegraph wrote:

“If we are not very much mistaken, Blind Husbands will introduce to the industry a new ‘super director’- Erich von Stroheim. Unlike many other directors who aspire to the ranks of the fortunate, he is not a near-Griffith, a near-DeMille or a near-Tourneur. His work is quite in a class by itself. It has individuality and originality...The atmosphere is deeper than mere realism. The details are truly remarkable. The interiors of the Alpine inns, the wayside shrines, and the peasant types were all the work of a man who knew very much what he was doing.”

== Theme ==
Blind Husbands, set amidst a tourist resort in the Austrian Dolomites, opens with the arrival of an upper-middle American couple, Dr. Robert Armstrong and his wife Margaret. The story examines their reaction to the strenuous efforts of an Austrian military officer, Lieutenant Eric von Steuben, to seduce Margaret. Von Stroheim's characterization of an unscrupulous yet sophisticated sexual predator was a refined variation of his role of “the man you love to hate” that he had cultivated in his post-WWI roles, most recently in Universal's The Heart of Humanity (1918). Here, however, von Stroheim seeks sexual conquest through low cunning, rather than with psychological terror and physical violence.

The original title of the movie, The Pinnacle, was based on von Stroheim's original screenplay and served as a metaphor that resonated physiologically with the picture's climax, in which Dr. Armstrong and Lieutenant von Steuben struggle for dominance on a lofty alpine mountain peak. Von Stroheim, outraged at Universal's substitution of the title with Blind Husbands, provoked a public denunciation from the director, defending The Pinnacle as “a meaningful title, a title that meant everything to the man who created [the film].” The title Blind Husbands invokes the “aristocratic American visitors” and Dr. Armstrong, who “fails to exhibit any signs of romantic affection” towards his attractive wife, a failure that the “lounge lizard” von Steuben expects to exploit. The complacent doctor, preoccupied with his alpine hiking, is slow to discern his wife's conflicted response to the officer's advances.

Blind Husbands is the only film in which von Stroheim submits members of America's leisure class to artistic analysis. This is the same social stratum that the young von Stroheim had serviced as an expert equestrian and a resort guide in Northern California during the years before World War I and before his arrival in Hollywood, a venue where “he seems to have had particular success with the ladies.”

Whereas von Stroheim's scenario for Blind Husbands required that his “alter ego” suffer a spectacular death, his subsequent autobiographical representations avoid similar fates.

A religious component appears in the film to reinforce the film's central metaphor that culminates in a contest on the “pinnacle”. Informed by von Stroheim's recent conversion to Catholicism, Blind Husbands’ romantic triangle unfolds during a local celebration of the Gala Peter and the reenactment of Christ’s transfiguration on Mt. Tabor, an unambiguous reference to the film’s central theme.

The most striking element in von Stroheim’s thematic scheme is the presentation of a young married woman who seriously contemplates engaging in an extramarital affair, which constitutes “a daring break with tradition” in cinematic treatments of the topic. The realism that von Stroheim brings to the first encounter among the principal characters establishes the “psychological complexity” of this theme. According to film historian Richard Koszarski:

“The very first sequence of the film, as the three principals travel in the coach to Croce Bianca, announces the arrival of a new master of psychological realism [in which] von Stroheim never hesitates to use Griffith’s analytical editing techniques to telegraph certain points directly. A series of close-ups establishes an immediate tension among the travelers, and the attraction of shifting glance to a well-turned ankle is demonstrated with considerable wit...the level of professionalism seen here puts most films of the period to shame, a fact quickly recognized in the first reviews.”

That the film and its theme arise from von Stroheim's own life experiences is “beyond question’: the characterization of Lieutenant Eric von Stuben “is a direct projection of von Stroheim himself.”

== Survival status and home video ==
Blind Husbands is preserved in several film archive and collections. The Museum of Modern Art preserves three 35mm prints of the 1924 rerelease version and the Austrian Film Museum preserves a nitrate print of an original German-language version, which last 7 minutes longer than the American prints.

The Austrian print was released on DVD by the Filmmuseum with a music score by Günter A. Buchwald whereas Kino Video released the MoMA print with a piano soundtrack by Donald Sosin arranged from the 1919 cue sheet and included the 1929 film The Great Gabbo.

A digital restoration of the film, which incorporates both footage from the Austrian and American print, was carried out by the Filmmuseum and premiered at the Vienna Konzerthaus in 2021.

== Sources ==
- Gallagher, Cullen; et al. (2009). "Oh, the Depravity! The Cinema of Erich von Stroheim".
- Higham, Charles (1973). The Art of the American Film: 1900-1971. New York: Doubleday & Company, Inc. ISBN 0-385-06935-9. LCCN 70-186026.
- Koszarski, Richard (1983). The Man You Loved to Hate: Erich von Stroheim and Hollywood. Oxford: Oxford University Press. ISBN 0-19-503239-X.
