= Gibson Gowland =

English film actor (1877–1951)

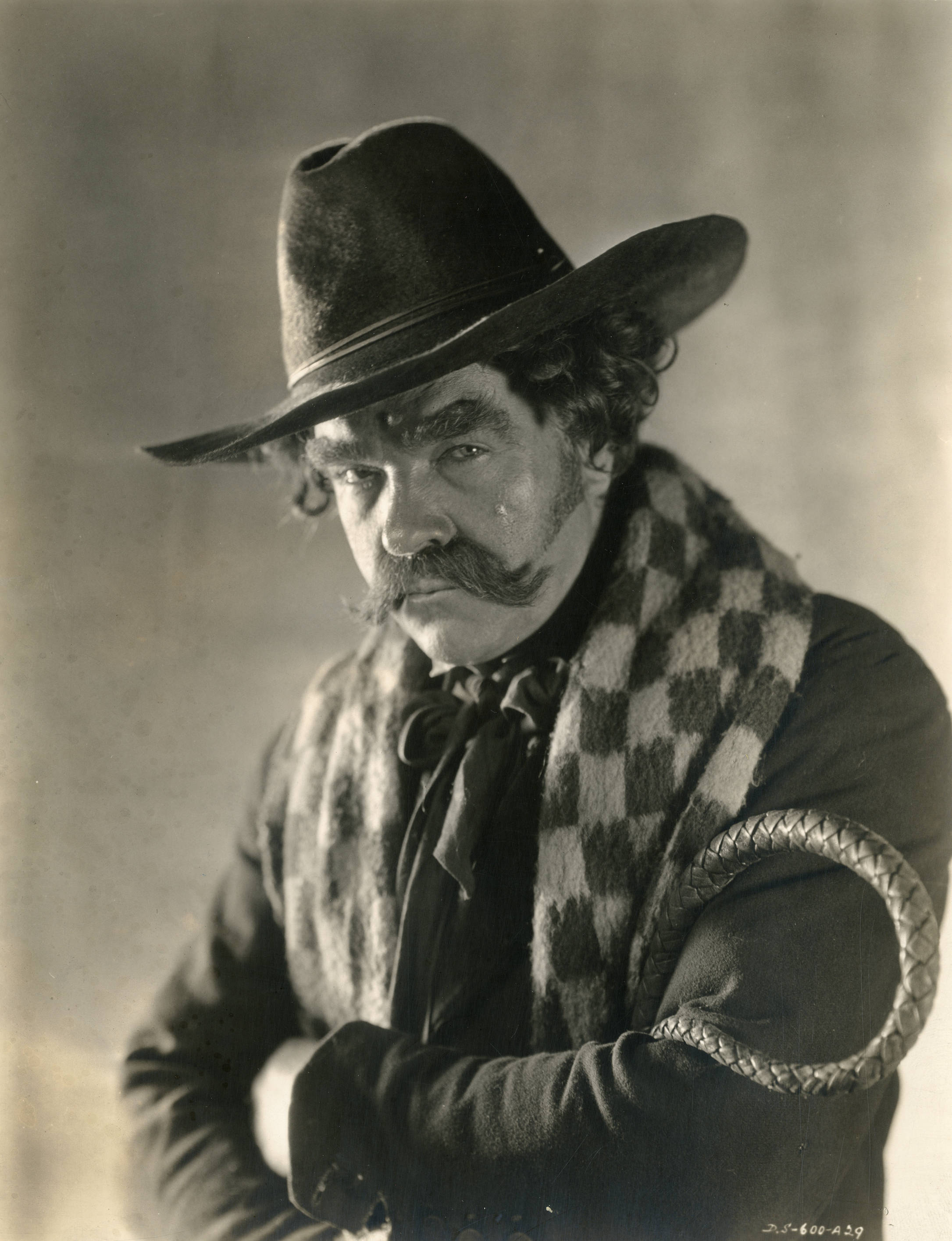
- Gowland in 1928
- Born: 4 January 1877; Spennymoor, County Durham, England
- Died: 9 September 1951 (aged 74); London, England
- Occupation: Actor
- Years active: 1925-1945
- Spouses: Beatrice Bird (m. 1913; div. 1918) Sylvia Andrew (divorced)
- Children: 2, including Peter Gowland

Gibson Gowland (4 January 1877 – 9 September 1951) was an English film actor.

== Biography ==
Gowland was born 4 January in either 1872 or 1877 (Note: Media reports at the time of his death claim Gowland was 74 years old, so this article lists the year of his birth as 1877.) in Spennymoor, County Durham. He started work as a sailor and later became the mate on a ship. For several years from the age of 25 he went to South Africa, where he hunted for big game, prospected for diamonds and also organised a theatrical company in Johannesburg, and acted in it. He prospected in Canada, where he made his debut on the legitimate stage.

Gowland went to the United States from Britain by way of Canada in 1913 where he met Beatrice Bird, also from Great Britain, whom he married. They moved to Hollywood, working as bit players. In 1914 he acted in D.W. Griffith's The Birth of a Nation, followed by Intolerance. In 1916, his son, actor and photographer Peter Gowland, was born.

Often cast as a villain, his only starring role (out of 63 films) was in Greed (1924), directed by Erich von Stroheim, based on the Frank Norris novel McTeague, and costarring ZaSu Pitts. The film has become a classic despite its having been cut to one-fifth its original length for commercial release by MGM. Gowland portrayed the protagonist, dentist John McTeague. Von Stroheim also directed Gowland in his 1919 film Blind Husbands.

Gowland was cast as Simon Buquet in the 1925 film version of The Phantom of the Opera. He had bit parts in dozens of films from 1938 to 1945, but was rarely credited on-screen. After two divorces, Gowland returned to England in 1944. He died in London on 9 September 1951 at the age of 74. He was buried in Golders Green Crematorium.

== Selected filmography ==
- The Birth of a Nation (1915) - Minor Role (uncredited)
- Jewel (1915) - Dr. Ballard
- Pennington's Choice (1915) - Mountain Man (uncredited)
- Macbeth (1916) - Minor Role (uncredited)
- The Promise (1917) - Stromberg
- Under Handicap (1917) - Batt Truxton
- The Secret of Black Mountain (1917, Short) - Jack Rance
- The Climber (1917, Short) - Buck Stringer
- Molly Entangled (1917)
- Breakers Ahead (1918) - Mike Burley
- The White Heather (1919)
- Blind Husbands (1919)
- Behind the Door (1919)
- The Fighting Shepherdess (1920)
- The Right of Way (1920)
- Ladies Must Live (1921)
- Shifting Sands (1922)
- Hutch Stirs 'em Up (1923)
- The Harbour Lights (1923)
- The Border Legion (1924)
- The Red Lily (1924)
- Love and Glory (1924)
- Greed (1924)
- The Prairie Wife (1925)
- The Phantom of the Opera (1925)
- The Outsider (1926)
- College Days (1926)
- Don Juan (1926)
- The Night of Love (1927)
- The Broken Gate (1927)
- The First Auto (1927)
- The Tired Business Man (1927)
- The Land Beyond the Law (1927)
- Sunrise: A Song of Two Humans (1927) (uncredited)
- The Isle of Forgotten Women (1927)
- Rose-Marie (1928)
- The Mysterious Island (1929)
- Land of Wanted Men (1931)
- A House Divided (1931)
- Without Honor (1932)
- S.O.S. Eisberg (1933)
- North Pole, Ahoy (1934)
- The Private Life of Don Juan (1934)
- King of the Damned (1935)
- The Stoker (1935)
- The House of the Spaniard (1936)
- Highland Fling (1936)
- The Wife of General Ling (1937)
- Cotton Queen (1937)
- Ship's Concert (1937)
- Tea Leaves in the Wind (1938)
- The Wolf Man (1941)
- Mutiny in the Arctic (1941)
- Going My Way (1944) as Churchgoer (uncredited)
