= Greed (1924 film) =

1924 film by Erich von Stroheim

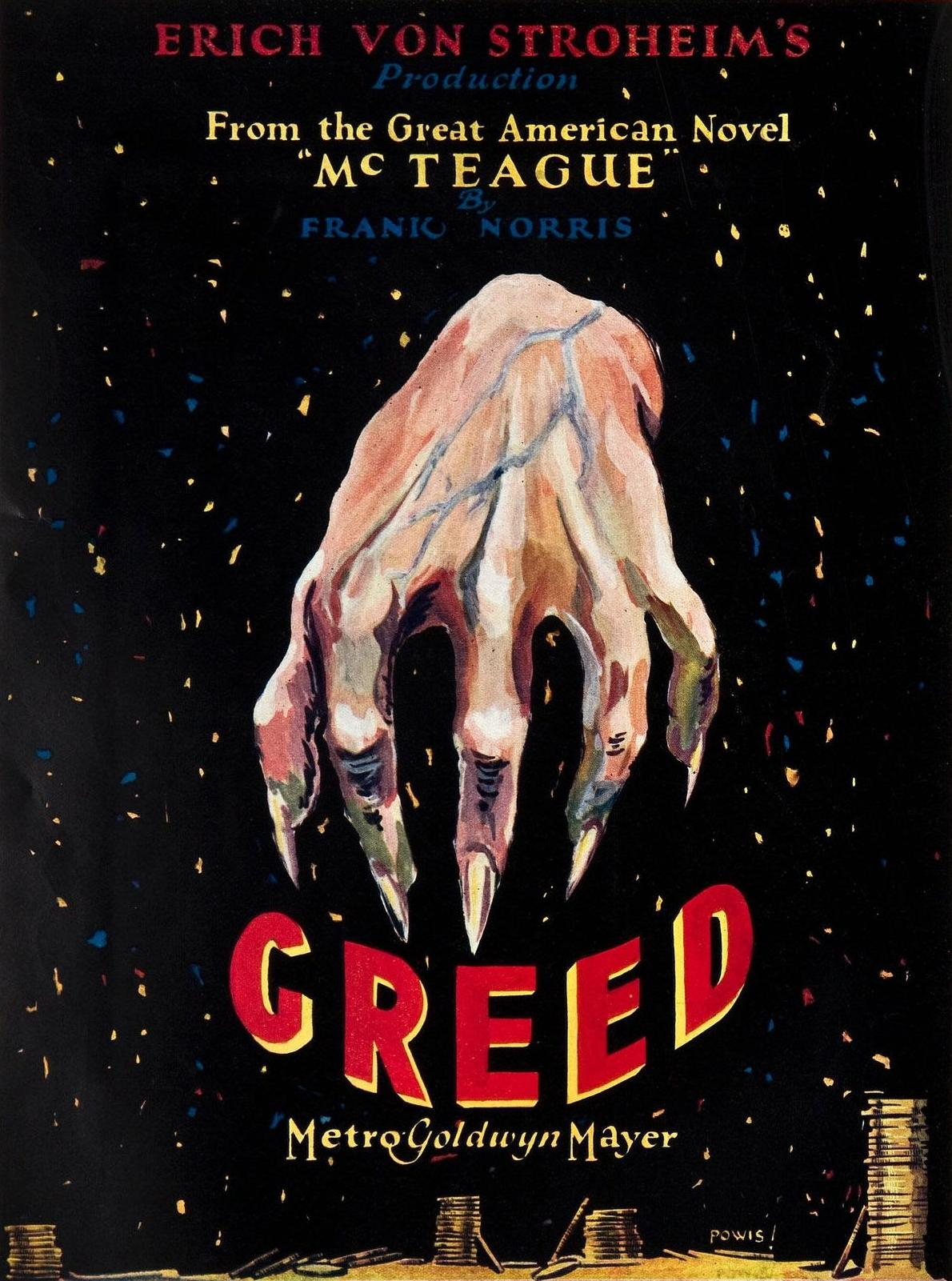
- Theatrical release poster
- Directed by: Erich von Stroheim
- Screenplay by: Erich von Stroheim; Contractually credited: June Mathis
- Based on: McTeague; 1899 novel by Frank Norris
- Produced by: Erich von Stroheim; Abe Lehr; Irving Thalberg
- Starring: Gibson Gowland; ZaSu Pitts; Jean Hersholt
- Cinematography: Ben F. Reynolds; William H. Daniels
- Edited by: Erich von Stroheim; Frank Hull (42-reel and 24-reel versions); Rex Ingram; Grant Whytock (18-reel version); June Mathis; Joseph W. Farnham (10-reel version)
- Music by: William Axt
- Production company: The Goldwyn Company–Metro-Goldwyn
- Distributed by: Metro-Goldwyn-Mayer
- Release date: December 4, 1924
- Running time: Over 9 hours (first cut); 140 minutes (original release); 239 minutes (reconstruction)
- Country: United States
- Languages: Silent film; English intertitles
- Budget: $665,603
- Box office: $274,827

Greed is a 1924 American silent psychological drama film written and directed by Erich von Stroheim and based on the 1899 Frank Norris novel McTeague. It stars Gibson Gowland as Dr. John McTeague; ZaSu Pitts as Trina Sieppe, his wife; and Jean Hersholt as McTeague's friend and eventual enemy Marcus Schouler. The film tells the story of McTeague, a San Francisco dentist, who marries his best friend Schouler's girlfriend Trina.

Greed was one of the few films of its time to be shot entirely on location, with von Stroheim shooting approximately 85 hours of footage before editing. Two months alone were spent shooting in Death Valley for the film's final sequence, and many of the cast and crew became ill. Von Stroheim used sophisticated filming techniques such as deep focus cinematography and montage editing. He considered Greed to be a Greek tragedy, in which environment and heredity controlled the characters' fates and reduced them to primitive bêtes humaines (human beasts), a naturalistic concept in the vein of Zola.

During editing, the production company merged with Metro-Goldwyn-Mayer (MGM), putting Irving Thalberg in charge of post-production. Thalberg had fired von Stroheim a few years earlier at Universal Pictures. Originally over nine hours long, Greed was edited against von Stroheim's wishes to about two-and-a-half hours. Only twelve people saw the full-length 42-reel version, now lost; some of them called it the greatest film ever made. Von Stroheim later called Greed his most fully realized work and was hurt both professionally and personally by the studio's re-editing of it.

The uncut version has been called the "holy grail" for film archivists, amid false claims of the discovery of the missing footage. In 1999, Turner Entertainment created a four-hour version that used stills of cut scenes to reconstruct the film. Greed was a critical and financial failure upon its initial release, but, by the 1950s, it began to be regarded as one of the greatest films ever made; film makers and scholars have noted its influence on subsequent films. In 1958, the film was voted number 6 on the prestigious Brussels 12 list at the 1958 World Expo.

In 1991, Greed was selected for preservation in the United States National Film Registry by the Library of Congress as "culturally, historically, or aesthetically significant".

== Plot ==
I never truckled, I never took off the hat to fashion and held it out for pennies. By God, I told them the truth. They liked it or they didn't like it. What had that to do with me? I told them the truth; I knew it for the truth then and I know it for the truth now.

— Frank Norris, quoted from his essay "The True Reward of the Novelist", in a title card at the beginning of Greed.

In 1908, John McTeague works in a gold mine in Placer County, California. A traveling dentist calling himself Dr. "Painless" Potter visits the town, and McTeague's mother begs Potter to take her son on as an apprentice. Potter agrees and McTeague eventually becomes a dentist, practicing on Polk Street in San Francisco.

Marcus Schouler brings Trina Sieppe, his cousin and intended fiancée, into McTeague's office for dental work. Schouler and McTeague are friends and McTeague gladly agrees to examine Trina. As they wait for an opening, she buys a lottery ticket. McTeague becomes enamored with Trina and begs Schouler for permission to court her. After seeing McTeague's conviction, Schouler agrees. Trina eventually agrees to marry McTeague and shortly afterwards her lottery ticket wins her $5,000. (Note: Approximately $179,000 in 2025 dollars) Schouler bitterly claims that the money should have been his, causing a rift between him and McTeague. After McTeague and Trina wed, they continue to live in their small apartment with Trina refusing to spend her $5,000.

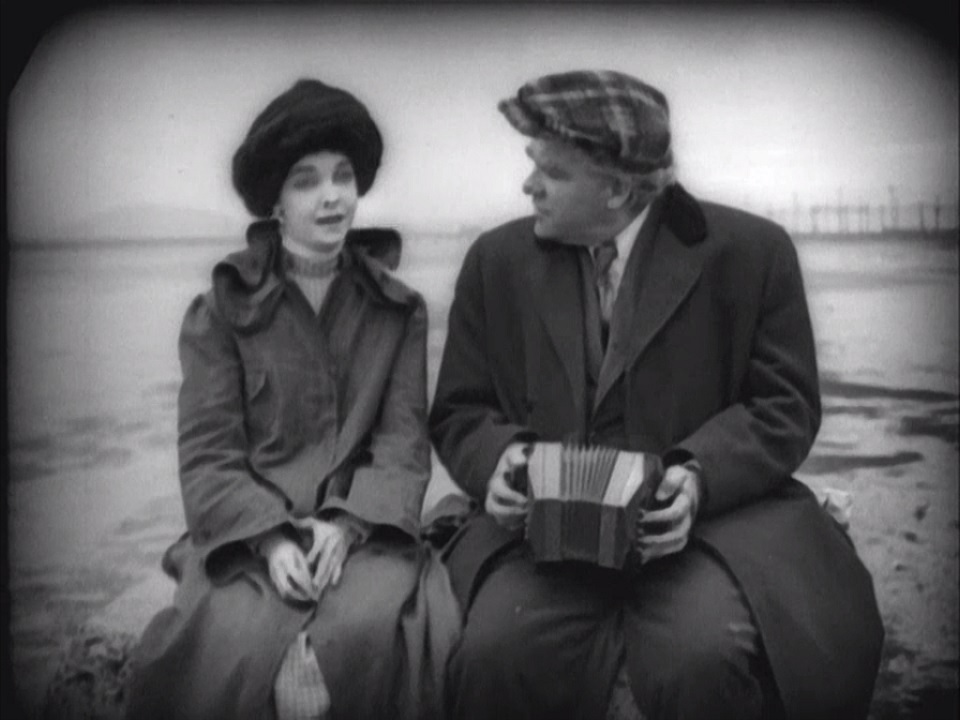
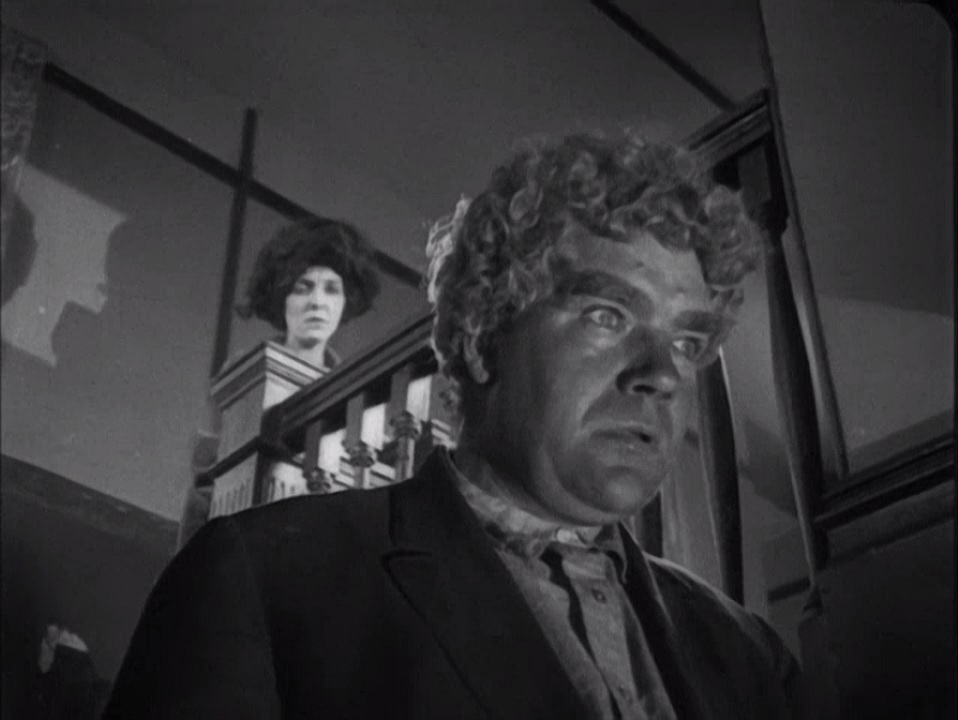
Trina and McTeague have a relationship that moves from romance to tragedy.

Schouler leaves San Francisco to become a cattle rancher. Before he goes, he secretly reports McTeague for practicing dentistry without a license to ruin him. McTeague is ordered to shut down his practice or face jail. Even though she has saved over $200 in addition to the original $5,000 from the lottery ticket, Trina is still unwilling to spend her money. Money becomes increasingly scarce, with the couple forced to sell their possessions. McTeague finally snaps and bites Trina's fingers in a fit of rage. Later, he goes fishing to earn money, taking Trina's savings (now totaling $450).

Trina's bitten fingers become infected and have to be amputated. To earn money she becomes a janitor at a children's school. She withdraws the $5,000 from the bank to keep it close to her, eventually spreading it on her bed so she can sleep on it. McTeague then returns, having spent the money he took, and asks Trina for more. The following day McTeague confronts Trina at the school. After a heated argument McTeague beats Trina to death and steals her $5,000.

McTeague returns to Placer County and teams up with a prospector named Cribbens. Headed towards Death Valley, they find a large quantity of quartz and plan to become millionaires. Before they can begin mining, McTeague senses danger and flees into Death Valley with a single horse, the remaining money and one water jug. Several marshals pursue him, joined by Schouler. Schouler wants to catch McTeague personally and rides into Death Valley alone.

The oppressive heat slows McTeague's progress. Schouler's progress is also beginning to wane when he spies McTeague and moves in to arrest him. After a confrontation, McTeague's horse bolts and Schouler shoots it, puncturing the water container. The water spills onto the desert floor. The pair fight one last time, with McTeague proving the victor but Schouler has handcuffed himself to McTeague. Finally, McTeague is left in the desert with no horse and no water, handcuffed to a corpse and unable to reach the remaining money. “O cursed lust of gold! When for thy sake, the fool throws up in his interest in both worlds. First, starved in this, then damn’d in that to come.”

=== Sub-plots ===
Stroheim's original edit contained two main sub-plots that were later cut. The point of these sub-plots was to contrast two possible results of Trina and McTeague's life together. The first depicted the lives of the junkman Zerkow and Maria Miranda Macapa, the young Mexican woman who collects junk for Zerkow and sold Trina the lottery ticket. Maria often talks about her imaginary solid gold dining set with Zerkow, who becomes obsessed by it. Eventually, believing she has riches hidden away, Zerkow marries her. He often asks about it, but she gives a different answer each time he mentions it. Zerkow does not believe her and becomes obsessed with prying the truth from her. He murders her and having lost his mind, leaps into San Francisco Bay.

The second sub-plot depicts the lives of Charles W. Grannis and Miss Anastasia Baker. Grannis and Baker are two elderly boarders who share adjoining rooms in the apartment complex where Trina and McTeague live. Throughout their time at the apartment complex, they have not met. They sit close to their adjoining wall and listen to the other for company, so they know almost everything about each other. They finally meet and cannot hide their long-time feelings for each other. When they reveal their love, Grannis admits he has $5,000, making him just as rich as Trina but this makes little difference to them. Eventually, they marry and a door connects their rooms.

== Cast ==
- Gibson Gowland as Dr. John McTeague, a dentist
- ZaSu Pitts as Trina Sieppe, McTeague's wife
- Jean Hersholt as Marcus Schouler, McTeague's friend

Prologue

- Jack Curtis as McTeague's father
- Tempe Pigott as McTeague's mother
- Florence Gibson as a hag
- Erich von Ritzau as Dr. "Painless" Potter, a traveling dentist

Sieppe Family

- Chester Conklin as Hans "Popper" Sieppe, Trina's father
- Silvia Ashton as "Mommer" Sieppe, Trina's mother
- Austen Jewell as August Sieppe, Trina's younger brother
- Oscar Gottell as Max Sieppe, Trina's younger brother
- Otto Gottell as Moritz Sieppe, Trina's younger brother
- Joan Standing as Selina, Trina's cousin
- Max Tyron as Uncle Rudolph Oelbermann, Trina's uncle

Subplots

- Dale Fuller as Maria Miranda Macapa, Zerkow's wife
- Cesare Gravina as Zerkow, a junkman
- Frank Hayes as Charles W. Grannis, proprietor of the Modern Dog Hospital
- Fanny Midgley as Miss Anastasia Baker, Grannis's neighbor and later wife

Friends and Neighbors at Polk Street

- Hughie Mack as Mr. Heise, the harness maker
- E. "Tiny" Jones as Mrs. Heise
- J. Aldrich Libbey as Mr. Ryer
- Reta Revela as Mrs. Ryer
- S.S. Simon as Joe Frenna
- Hugh J. McCauley as the photographer
- William Mollenhauer as the palmist

Others

- William Barlow as the Minister
- Lon Poff as the man from the lottery company
- James F. Fulton as Cribbens, a prospector
- James Gibson as a Deputy
- Jack McDonald as the sheriff of Placer County
- Erich von Stroheim as the balloon vendor

== Production ==
=== Background and writing ===
I intended to show men and women as they are all over the world, none of them perfect, with their good and bad qualities, their noble and idealistic sides and their jealous, vicious, mean and greedy sides. I was not going to compromise. I felt that after the last war, the motion picture going public had tired of the cinematographic 'chocolate éclairs' which had been stuffed down their throats and which had in a large degree figuratively ruined their stomachs with this overdose of Saccharose in pictures. Now, I felt, they were ready for a large bowl of plebeian but honest corned beef and cabbage'.

— Erich von Stroheim.

Greed is based on the American author Frank Norris's 1899 novel McTeague: A Story of San Francisco. Von Stroheim's interest in McTeague can be traced back to January 1920, when he told a journalist that he wanted to film the novel. He had lived in San Francisco in the early 1910s, living there in poverty like that of the story's characters. He eventually moved to Los Angeles, and worked his way up in the film industry from extra to acting in villainous or aristocratic roles in films. By 1919, von Stroheim had finally become a successful director in his own right at Universal Film Manufacturing Company, although one with a reputation of going over budget and over schedule.

Upon the appointment of Irving Thalberg as general manager at Universal, von Stroheim's defiance of commercial and industrial norms was no longer tolerated. After Thalberg's prior shutdown of Foolish Wives in 1921 (which had been shooting non-stop for eleven months), and after six weeks of filming on Merry-Go-Round, von Stroheim was fired from the studio on October 6, 1922. This was a step unprecedented in Hollywood, heralding a new era in which the producer and the studio would hold artistic control over actors and directors. By this time von Stroheim had received several offers of contracts with other studios, even before being fired from Universal. He had met with executives of the Goldwyn Company on September 14, 1922, less than a month before, and he formally signed with them in late November.

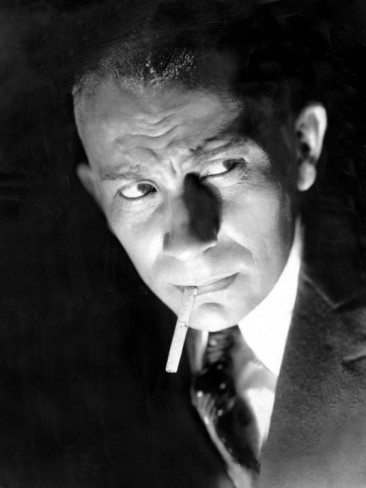
Erich von Stroheim in 1920, the year he first publicly expressed interest in adapting the novel McTeague

.

Von Stroheim chose his new studio because of the level of artistic freedom he was offered, which he had been denied at Universal under Thalberg. In March of that year, Frank Joseph (Joe) Godsol was elected president of Goldwyn Pictures. Board of Directors member Abe Lehr publicly promised that "each director will have his own staff and will be given every facility in putting into production his own individuality and personality." Von Stroheim signed a one-year, three-feature deal with Goldwyn on November 20, 1922. The deal stipulated that each feature would be between 4,500 and 8,500 feet (1,400 and 2,600 m) long, cost no more than $175,000 and be completed in fourteen weeks. It also promised von Stroheim $30,000 for each completed film.

Lehr initially hired von Stroheim in order to film a big-budget version of the operetta The Merry Widow, which the producer saw as a guaranteed hit; von Stroheim convinced Lehr to let him make Greed first, promising low costs. A press release of February 1923 said that although von Stroheim had "run rather freely to large sets in the past, [he] seems to have reformed—or surrendered—for it is announced that he will not build any sets at all."

Von Stroheim wrote a highly detailed 300-page script that contained camera movements, composition and tint cues. Among the changes that he made to Norris's novel was giving McTeague the first name of John and omitting Norris's antisemitism. McTeague had been filmed once before as Life's Whirlpool, a five-reel short by William A. Brady's World Pictures, starring Broadway star Holbrook Blinn as McTeague, which had been released in 1916. Film critics disliked this version and von Stroheim later criticized Blinn's performance. According to the film historian, Kevin Brownlow, Life's Whirlpool was also shot on location in Death Valley.

Von Stroheim was known for his perfectionism and his insolence towards studio executives. Working on Greed, von Stroheim set out to make a realistic film about everyday people and rejected the Hollywood tropes of glamor, happy endings and upper-class characters. Before shooting began, von Stroheim told a reporter:

It is possible to tell a great story in motion pictures in such a way that the spectator forgets he is looking at beauteous Gertie Gefelta, the producer's pet and discovers himself intensely interested, just as if he were looking out of a window at life itself. He will come to believe that what he is gazing at is real—a cameraman was present in the household and nobody knew it. They went on in their daily life with their joys, fun and tragedies and the camera stole it all, holding it up afterward for all to see.

In early January 1923, von Stroheim arrived in San Francisco, where he scouted locations and finished writing the shooting script. While researching for Greed, he attended society functions in town and met many friends of Frank Norris, including his brother Charles and his sister-in-law Kathleen. To capture the authentic spirit of the story, von Stroheim insisted on filming on location in San Francisco, the Sierra Nevada mountains, the Big Dipper Mine in Iowa Hill, and Death Valley. He rented some of the actual buildings that had inspired scenes in the novel. Other locations included Cliff House and San Francisco Bay.

Norris had similarly scouted settings for his novel and chose the upstairs of a building on the corner of Polk and California street as McTeague's dentist office, as well as many of the saloons and lunch counters in the area. Von Stroheim discovered that many of the locations that Norris had described, such as Polk Street, had been destroyed in the 1906 San Francisco earthquake, but he was able to find suitable period locations on Hayes and Laguna streets. For authenticity, von Stroheim had no sets built in San Francisco and only redecorated existing locations, such as saloons, butcher shops, and wooden shacks, thus saving on construction costs.

Despite the strict conditions of von Stroheim's initial contract, Goldwyn approved the lengthy shooting script before filming began. Production Manager J. J. Cohn later explained that "they thought they could control him when the time comes."

=== Casting ===
Scene of the film Souls for Sale, showing von Stroheim directing Jean Hersholt in a screen test for Greed

With the exception of Jean Hersholt, all of the main actors in Greed were regulars of von Stroheim's earlier films, a group dubbed the "Stroheim Stock Company". Gibson Gowland had previously appeared in Blind Husbands and returned to the U.S. from Scotland for the role of John McTeague. Cesare Gravina, who played the junkman Zerkow, and Dale Fuller, the lottery-ticket seller Maria, had both appeared in Foolish Wives and would later appear in The Merry Widow. Other actors in von Stroheim's Stock Company included Sidney Bracey, Mae Busch, George Fawcett, Maude George, Hughie Mack and George Nichols.

Trina was the most difficult role to cast, and ZaSu Pitts was hired at the last minute, after von Stroheim had rejected both Claire Windsor and Colleen Moore. Pitts had previously acted only in comedic roles; Greed was her first dramatic part. The actress later appeared in both The Wedding March and Hello, Sister! Von Stroheim said that Pitts was "the greatest psychopathological actress in the American cinema" and that "she should not be in comedy, for she is the greatest of all tragediennes."

Von Stroheim had met casually with Jean Hersholt to discuss the role of Marcus Schouler, but he was initially reluctant to cast him. However, after Hersholt adjusted his appearance and wardrobe to more closely resemble Schouler, von Stroheim changed his mind on the spot. With the exception of Gowland, von Stroheim shot extensive screen tests of all the other actors at Goldwyn with cinematographer Paul Ivano. A scene from the Goldwyn film Souls for Sale is thought to be behind-the-scenes footage of von Stroheim directing Greed, but it actually depicts him directing Hersholt during one of these screen tests.

=== Filming ===
Filming commenced in San Francisco on March 13, 1923 and concluded in October, for a total of 198 days, producing about 85 hours of footage. The San Francisco location shooting wrapped in late June. Despite the initial contract between von Stroheim and Goldwyn, Lehr agreed to double the film's budget to $347,000 three days after shooting began. Von Stroheim had already worked twenty-hour days for over two months of pre-production and collapsed on set after a few days of filming. He remained in good health for the remainder of the shoot. This was not the only mishap on set; during scenes shot at San Francisco Bay, Cesare Gravina developed double pneumonia, making von Stroheim bitterly ashamed that Gravina's entire performance was later cut from the film, despite the actor's dedication to the role. Hersholt was knocked unconscious by Gowland during the picnic scene (later cut) in which McTeague and Schouler fight, and Pitts was nearly run over by a trolley. In late May, Lehr visited von Stroheim on the set and praised the footage that he had seen, saying that "it has atmosphere, color and realism that could not possibly have been reproduced in the studio."

One scene that von Stroheim re-shot at the studio's insistence depicted a younger McTeague in his apprenticeship with Potter. In the scene McTeague is too embarrassed to examine the teeth of a young woman and Potter has to take over. A thinly disguised ZaSu Pitts portrayed the woman so that the audience would see a resemblance to Trina, but the studio insisted that the scene was confusing and von Stroheim agreed to re-shoot it. Von Stroheim also conceded his original vision when shooting the bar confrontation between McTeague and Schouler. The director wanted to have a knife thrower actually throw a real knife at Gowland's head; Von Stroheim was overruled by Gowland himself, who refused to participate in such a dangerous stunt. A special-effect shot was created instead.

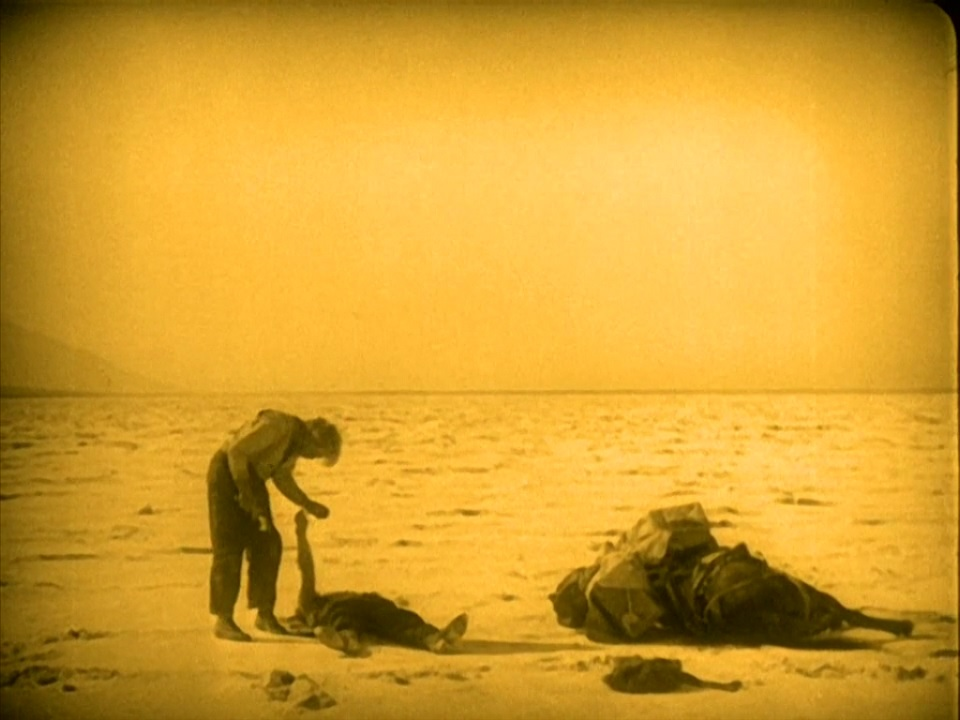
The Death Valley scenes, including this final sequence, were filmed over two months during midsummer, in harsh conditions.

After filming in San Francisco finished in June, the production traveled to Death Valley. Most Hollywood films that required desert scenes settled for the local Oxnard dunes north of Los Angeles, but von Stroheim insisted on authenticity. Death Valley had no roads, hotels, services or running water and was teeming with tarantulas, scorpions, rattlesnakes and black widow spiders. The nearest populated area to the shoot was around 100 miles (160 km) away, and insurance coverage was denied. Filming in Death Valley lasted through July and August 1923, allowing Gowland and Hersholt to grow the beards necessary for the sequence. During production, the highest temperature officially recorded in Death Valley was 123 °F (51 °C). Of the forty-three members of the cast and crew who worked on the Death Valley sequence, one cook died of heatstroke and fourteen others became ill and were sent back to Los Angeles Heat exhaustion was a daily occurrence for members of the crew. Hersholt spent a week in the hospital after shooting was completed, suffering from internal bleeding. He claimed to have lost 27 pounds (12 kg), and was covered in blisters due to severe sunburn by the end of filming. (Despite the hardship, Hersholt later stated that he considered his role in Greed to be the best of his career.) In order to motivate Hersholt and Gibson during the scene where they fight, von Stroheim yelled at them, "Fight, fight! Try to hate each other as much as you both hate me!"

Throughout filming, von Stroheim brought musicians on set to help create the appropriate mood for the actors. For the Death Valley scenes, he employed a harmonium and a violin player. A theme inspired by the music of Italian operatic composer Ruggero Leoncavallo was composed and played throughout production. Other music included the popular songs "Nearer, My God, to Thee", "Hearts and Flowers", "Oh Promise Me", and "Call Me Thine Own".

Filming moved to Placer County on September 13 and continued for less than a month. The Big Dipper Mine had been closed for ten years, so von Stroheim convinced the Goldwyn Company to lease and renovate it for filming. While first visiting Placer County during pre-production, von Stroheim had met Harold Henderson, a local resident and fan of Norris's whose brother had worked in the mine in the 1890s. Von Stroheim hired Henderson to oversee the renovation of the mine and other locations in Iowa Hill. Von Stroheim also wanted to restore the local cemetery for a newly invented scene depicting McTeague's mother's funeral, but the Goldwyn Company turned down this proposal. Inside the mine, von Stroheim usually shot at night between 9 pm and 6 am. Cinematographer William H. Daniels later said that von Stroheim insisted on descending 3,000 feet (900 m) underground for realism, even though the setting would have looked exactly the same at 100 feet (30 m). Filming of Greed was completed on October 6, 1923, after 198 days. Despite his original contract stipulating that all films be under 8,500 feet (2,600 m), von Stroheim shot a total of 446,103 feet (135,972 m) of footage for the film, running approximately 85 hours.

=== Style ===
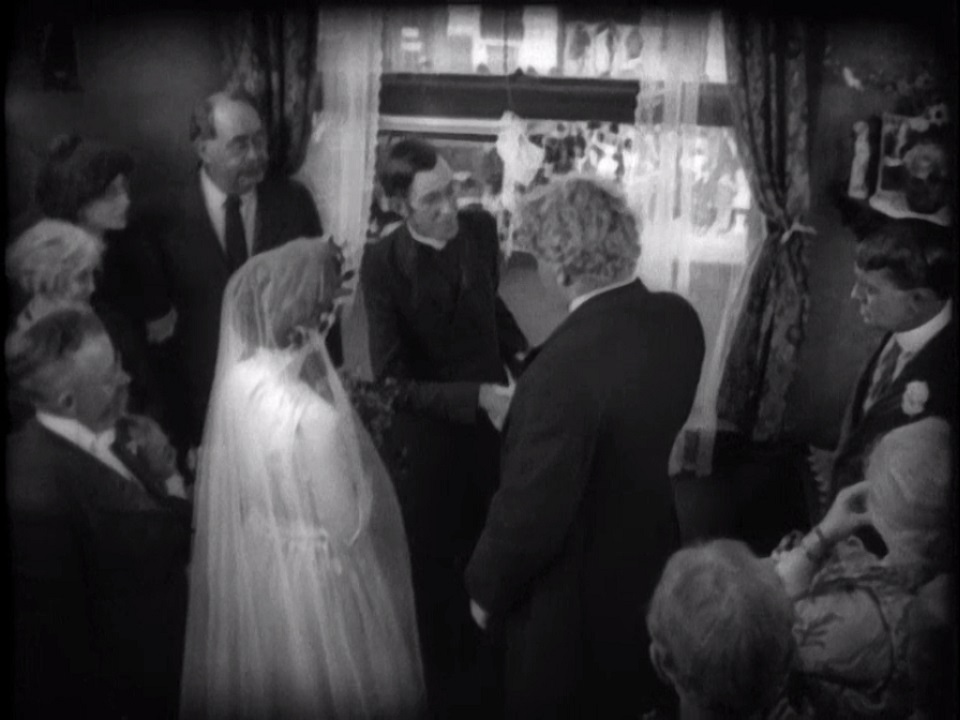
The wedding scene made innovative use of deep focus cinematography, despite challenges with the lighting.

Von Stroheim's biographer Arthur Lennig compared the director's visual style to that of pioneering filmmaker D. W. Griffith but felt that "unlike Griffith, who viewed scenes as though through a fourth wall, von Stroheim shot from many sides and from different angles; he also used deep focus, meaningful foregrounds and effective camera movement." Greed's lighting included high contrast, chiaroscuro techniques with pools or shafts of lights illuminating an otherwise dark space. Examples of this technique include the scene where McTeague begs Trina for money in a pool of moonlight and the merry-go-round scene in which characters alternate between appearing only as dark silhouettes and being fully lit.

Daniels was especially proud of the wedding scene, which has a funeral procession visible through the window and was difficult to light properly. Greed has often been praised for its use of deep focus cinematography, seventeen years before its more-famous application in Citizen Kane. Daniels sometimes used incandescent lights instead of studio arc lights, due to the constraints of his locations. He later said that von Stroheim "was one of the first to insist on no make-up for men, on real paint on the walls which were shiny, real glass in the windows, pure white on sets and in costumes ... everything up to then had been painted a dull brown" to mask the scratches on worn-down film prints. Although not officially credited, Ernest B. Schoedsack worked on the picture as a camera operator.

Von Stroheim favored "Soviet-style" montage editing. Greed often uses dramatic close-ups and cuts instead of long takes. One exception to this is the scene in which Schouler becomes angry with McTeague and breaks his pipe, which was shot in one long, unbroken take. Von Stroheim also used symbolic cross-cutting for dramatic effect, such as his use of animals in the film and a shot of a train when McTeague and Trina first kiss. In 1932 film theorist Andrew Buchanan called von Stroheim a montage director, stating that "each observation would be captured in a 'close-up' and at leisure, he would assemble his 'shots' in just the order which would most forcibly illustrate the fact." In the 1950s film critic André Bazin praised von Stroheim's use of mise en scène and noted his "one simple rule for directing. Take a close look at the world, keep on doing so and in the end it will lay bare for you all its cruelty and ugliness."

Despite von Stroheim's reputation as a perfectionist, Greed contains several anachronisms. In the scenes on Polk Street, the main characters are clothed in 1890s fashions, but the extras wear 1920s clothing. Von Stroheim did his best to avoid such historical mistakes; he shot only those buildings that were from the era Greed was set in, and he kept motor vehicles out of sight while filming. Daniels stated that, despite his desire for authenticity, von Stroheim sometimes had walls knocked out of real locations to achieve a desired camera position.

=== Themes ===
Frank Norris's novel belongs to the literary school of naturalism founded by French author Émile Zola. McTeague depicts the fate of its lower-class characters in terms of heredity and their environment, with the belief that "man's nature, despite free will, is determined by genetic and environmental factors" and that heredity controls fate, despite efforts at upward mobility. This literary style was influenced by Charles Darwin and portrayed characters whose higher states of being, the rational and compassionate, are in conflict with their lower states, the bête humaine (human beast). McTeague was first published in 1899 and was inspired by an October 1893 murder case in which Patrick Collins, a poor husband with a history of beating his wife Sarah, finally stole her money and stabbed her to death at her San Francisco workplace. Sarah Collins worked at the Lest Norris kindergarten, which was financed by Norris's family.

Von Stroheim did not see Greed as political and told a journalist that he considered it to be like a Greek tragedy. Despite the characters' struggles with poverty and class, von Stroheim followed the naturalist technique of portraying characters whose lives are driven by fate and their inner nature. Von Stroheim employed variations of this theme in his other films, which often involved a commoner falling in love with an aristocrat or royal.

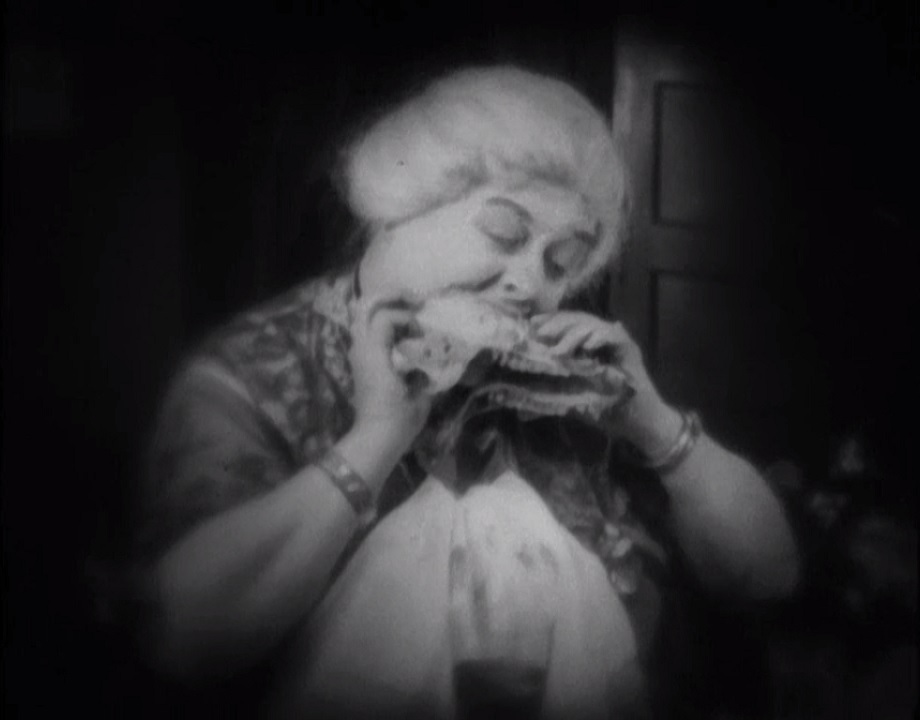
In the wedding banquet scene, Trina's mother grotesquely devours her food.

One of the cinematic techniques by which von Stroheim portrayed naturalism was animal symbolism. In Greed McTeague is associated with a canary, only briefly mentioned in the novel. Von Stroheim altered Norris's original ending and has McTeague release the canary in Death Valley. McTeague buys Trina a female canary as a wedding gift and early in their marriage von Stroheim cuts from a shot of them kissing to birds fluttering wildly in their cage. Another scene with animal imagery includes cross-cutting between a cat attempting to pounce on the canaries in the scene where Schouler bids goodbye to McTeague and Trina without telling them that he has informed on McTeague. Dogs, cats and monkeys are associated with various supporting characters. Von Stroheim also used the naturalist technique of giving characters specific objects, gestures or phrases that repeat throughout the film as a visual leitmotif. For example, Trina tugs on her lips and McTeague fiddles with his birdcage.

Throughout his career von Stroheim used grotesque imagery and characters. This is most apparent in the wedding-banquet scene, which includes a midget, a hunchback, a woman with buck teeth and a boy on crutches. The wedding guests violently and crudely devour their meal like animals. This scene was unlike any other in films of that period, which treated meals with dignity and a sense of communion. Other instances of grotesque imagery include Trina's fingers becoming infected and amputated. Von Stroheim contrasted love scenes between McTeague and Trina with their ugly, lower-class environment, such as the sewer with the dead rat and a garbage truck driving by as they kiss.

As in his other films, von Stroheim used Christian imagery and symbols, such as crosses and churches. Trina first shows signs of greed on Easter Sunday and is murdered by McTeague on Christmas Eve. Christmas Eve was often depicted in von Stroheim's films and was close to the date of his father's death. Lennig asserted that the character of McTeague's father (who was only briefly mentioned in the novel) is based on von Stroheim's own father, while McTeague's mother is a tribute to von Stroheim's mother, to whom Greed is dedicated. Von Stroheim stated that he considered all of his good qualities to have come from his mother and all of his bad qualities to have come from his father.

== Editing ==
=== Initial editing ===
Editing Greed took almost a year and von Stroheim's contract did not include payment for his post-production work. He and his chief film cutter Frank Hull worked on the film for several months before completing a rough cut. Von Stroheim was indecisive during editing. He felt restricted by his contract's limitation on the length of the film. Von Stroheim colored certain scenes with gold tinting by using the Handschiegl Color Process, in which individual frames are hand colored with stencils. Von Stroheim credited himself in the beginning titles with "Personally directed by Erich von Stroheim."

Other than studio personnel, only twelve people saw the original 42-reel (Note: It is traditional to discuss the length of theatrical motion pictures in terms of "reels". The standard length of a 35 mm motion picture reel is 1,000 feet (300 meters). This length runs approximately 11 minutes at sound speed (24 frames per second) and slightly longer at silent film speed (which may vary from approximately 16 to 22 frames per second). Therefore the 42-reel version of Greed was 462 minutes (8 hours) at 24 fps, 551 minutes (9 hours) at 20 fps and longer at other speeds.) version of Greed at a special screening in January 1924; they included Harry Carr, Rex Ingram, Aileen Pringle, Carmel Myers, Idwal Jones, Joseph Jackson, Jack Jungmeyer, Fritz Tidden, Welford Beaton, Valentine Mandelstam, and Jean Bertin. After the screening Jones, Carr and Ingram all agreed that they had just seen the greatest film ever made and that it was unlikely that a better film would ever be made. Carr wrote a review of the advance screening where he raved that he "saw a wonderful picture the other day—that no one else will ever see ... I can't imagine what they are going to do with it. It is like Les Miserables. Episodes come along that you think have no bearing on the story, then 12 or 14 reels later it hits you with a crash. For stark, terrible realism and marvelous artistry, it is the greatest picture I have ever seen. But I don't know what it will be like when it shrinks to 8 reels." Jonathan Rosenbaum suggested that Carr was most likely referring to a cut sequence early in the film that introduced all of the characters who lived in McTeague's building. The forty-minute scene depicted what the tenants did on a Saturday afternoon, and established cinematic atmosphere without furthering the plot. Rosenbaum compared the cut sequence to novels of the 19th century and to the first few hours of Jacques Rivette's Out 1. Jones publicly praised the advance screening and compared Greed to The Cabinet of Dr. Caligari and Dr. Mabuse the Gambler. However, Welford Beaton of The Film Spectator disliked the 42-reel version and criticized its excessive use of close-ups.

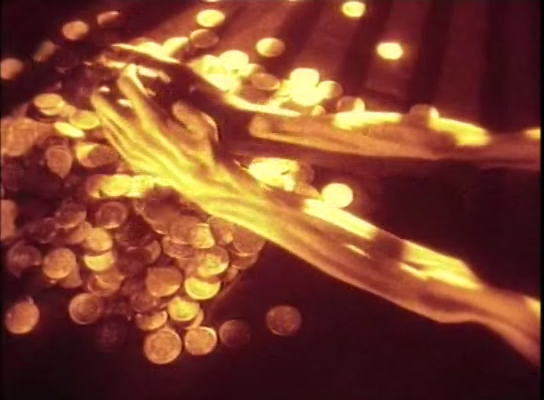
Some scenes, like this one, were gold tinted by von Stroheim himself, hand coloring individual frames with stencils.

Many sources claim that the 42-reel version was only ever intended to be a rough cut, and that Von Stroheim chose to cut it down to 24 reels by March 18, 1924, with the intention of screening it with intermissions over two nights. The director had difficulty cutting the film down, telling his friend Don Ryan, "I could take out sequences and thus get the job over in a day. That would be child's play. But I can't do it. It would leave gaps that could only be bridged through titles. When you do such a thing you have illustrated subtitles instead of a motion picture." Von Stroheim later claimed that at this time the Goldwyn Company wanted him to shoot a scene of McTeague waking up in his dentist chair, showing the entire film to have been a bad dream. While von Stroheim was editing the 24-reel cut June Mathis, who was the head of the Goldwyn Story Department, had made her own 13-reel version of Greed by January 21, 1924. She ordered even more cuts to be made on January 29, but then left for Rome in early February to oversee the production of Ben-Hur and was uninvolved in the film's editing for several months.

After having completed the 24-reel (Note: 264 minutes (4 hours and 24 minutes) at 24 fps and 315 minutes (5 hours and 15 minutes) at 20 fps.) cut of Greed, von Stroheim told Goldwyn executives that he could not cut another frame. Goldwyn producers thought that this version was still too long and told him to cut it to a more manageable length. Von Stroheim then sent the film to his friend, director Rex Ingram, who turned it over to his editor, Grant Whytock. Whytock had worked with von Stroheim on The Devil's Pass Key and was familiar with the director's style and tastes. Whytock initially proposed that it be split in two, with one 8-reel film ending with the wedding and a second 7-reel film ending at Death Valley. Whytock eventually cut the film down to 18 reels. (Note: 198 minutes (3 hours and 18 minutes) at 24 fps and 236 minutes (3 hours and 56 minutes) at 20 fps.) His only major cut was the entire subplot of Zerkow and Maria, which he thought was "very distasteful". Otherwise he simply cut down scenes and cut out 1,200 feet (400 m) of quick "flash" shots that only lasted a few frames. However, Whytock's version of Greed retained the prologue and other subplots, as well as much of the humor that was later cut out of it.

Whytock and Ingram screened their version of Greed to studio executives, who responded favorably to it but worried that the tragic ending would be hard to sell to the public. Ingram then sent the 18-reel version to von Stroheim and told him, "If you cut one more frame I shall never speak to you again." On April 10, 1924, the Goldwyn Company officially agreed to merge with Metro Pictures, putting von Stroheim's nemesis Thalberg directly in charge of Greed. Von Stroheim and Louis B. Mayer had a lengthy confrontation over the film's editing, which according to both men ended with von Stroheim claiming that all women were whores and Mayer punching him. (Note: In a remarkably similar story, screen actor John Gilbert once told Mayer that his own mother was a whore and Mayer allegedly chased him with a knife.) Mayer disliked the film because of its lack of glamor, optimism, or morality and considered it to be a guaranteed flop.

=== Studio editing ===
MGM executives screened Greed at full length once to meet contractual obligations. Idwal Jones, a San Francisco critic, attended the all-day screening and wrote that while some of the scenes were compelling, von Stroheim's desire that "every comma of the book [be] put in" was ultimately negative. MGM then took control and re-edited it. The studio ordered June Mathis to cut it down further; she assigned the job to Joseph W. Farnham, a well-known "titles editor", who patched scenes together using title cards to keep continuity. His contributions to Greed include the notorious title cards "Such was McTeague" and "Let's go over and sit on the sewer", which were snickered at for years. Eventually, Farnham reduced Greed to 10 reels, totaling 10,607 feet (3,233 m). (Note: Approximately 118 minutes (1 hour and 58 minutes) at 24 fps.) Von Stroheim said that the film "was cut by a hack with nothing on his mind but his hat." He later bitterly lamented that Greed was made before the financial success of Eugene O'Neill's five-hour play Strange Interlude in 1928. Von Stroheim angrily disowned the final version, blaming Mathis for destroying his masterpiece.

One week before Greed's release the New York State Motion Picture Committee (which censored films) demanded several more cuts on moral grounds. These cuts included the administration of ether in the dental scenes and certain instances of foul language. Although these cuts were made to prints that were screened in New York State, the footage was kept in many other prints.

=== Difference between von Stroheim's cut and MGM's cut ===
The main cuts to Greed were the elimination of its two sub-plots and other entire sequences, while individual scenes were often not touched. Commenting about the cuts made in the film to the Los Angeles Times, Thalberg stated:

This whole story is about greed—a progressive greed. It is the story of the way greed grew in Trina's heart until it obsessed her. I found that the junk dealer's greed was so much greater than hers that it almost destroyed the theme. His intense greed drowned out Trina's greed just as a steam whistle drowns out a small street noise. Instead of hurting the picture, throwing out this junk dealer's story made the picture stronger.

Thalberg also stated that he "took no chances in cutting it. We took it around to different theaters in the suburbs, ran it at its enormous length, and then we took note of the places at which interest seemed to droop."

Individual scenes or sequences that were cut include McTeague and Trina's early, happy years of marriage, the sequence showing McTeague and Trina eventually moving into their shack, the family life of the Sieppe family before Trina's marriage, the prologue depicting McTeague's mother and father at the Big Dipper mine and McTeague's apprenticeship. Other cuts included the more suggestive and sexual close-up shots depicting McTeague and Trina's physical attraction to each other, the scenes after McTeague has murdered Trina and roams around San Francisco and Placer County, additional footage of Death Valley, additional footage of Trina with her money, and a more gradual version of Trina's descent into greed and miserly obsession.

== Reception ==
=== Release and critical reviews ===
The theatrical release version of Greed.

Greed premiered on December 4, 1924, at the Cosmopolitan Theatre in Columbus Circle, New York City, which was owned by William Randolph Hearst. Frank Norris had once worked for Hearst as a foreign correspondent during the Spanish–American War and Hearst praised Greed, calling it the greatest film he had ever seen. Hearst's newspapers promoted the film, but MGM did very little advertising. At the time of the release von Stroheim was in Los Angeles, having begun production on The Merry Widow on December 1. In May 1926 Greed was released in Berlin, where its premiere famously caused a riot at the theater that may have been instigated by members of the then-fledgling Nazi party.

Greed received mostly negative reviews. The trade paper Harrison's Report said that "[i]f a contest were to be held to determine which has been the filthiest, vilest, most putrid picture in the history of the motion picture business, I am sure that Greed would win." Variety Weekly called it "an out-and-out box office flop" only six days after its premiere and claimed that the film had taken two years to shoot, cost $700,000 and was originally 130 reels long. The review went on to say that "nothing more morbid and senseless, from a commercial picture standpoint, has been seen on the screen for a long, long time" and that despite its "excellent acting, fine direction and the undoubted power of its story ... it does not entertain." In its December 1924 – January 1925 issue, Exceptional Photoplays called it "one of the most uncompromising films ever shown on the screen. There have already been many criticisms of its brutality, its stark realism, its sordidness. But the point is that it was never intended to be a pleasant picture." In the February 1925 issue of Theatre Magazine, Aileen St. John-Brenon wrote that "the persons in the photoplay are not characters, but types—they are well selected, weighed and completely drilled. But they did not act; they do not come to life. They perform their mission like so many uncouth images of miserliness and repugnant animalism." Mordaunt Hall of the New York Times gave the film a mostly positive review in regards to the acting and directing while criticizing how it was edited, writing that MGM "clipped this production as much as they dared ... and are to be congratulated on their efforts and the only pity is that they did not use the scissors more generously in the beginning." In a Life Magazine article, Robert E. Sherwood also defended MGM's cutting of the film and called von Stroheim "a genius ... badly in need of a stopwatch." Iris Barry of the Museum of Modern Art (MoMA) disliked the tinting, saying "a not very pleasing yellow tinge is smudged in." A March 1925 review in Pictureplay magazine stated, "perhaps an American director would not have seen greed as a vice."

A more favorable review came from Richard Watts, Jr. of the New York Herald Tribune, who called Greed "the most important picture yet produced in America ... It is the one picture of the season that can hold its own as a work of dramatic art worthy of comparison with such stage plays as What Price Glory? and Desire Under the Elms." The April 20, 1925 edition of The Montreal Gazette claimed it "impresses as a powerful film" and described the "capacity audience" screening as "one of the few pictures which are as worthy of serious consideration ... which offer a real and convincing study of life and character and that secure their ends by artistic and intellectual means rather than by writing down to the level of the groundlings." The review went on to describe the direction as "masterly", citing "its remarkable delineation of character development and the subtle touches which convey ideas through vision rather than the written word, an all too-rare employment of the possibilities of the cinema play as a distinct branch of art capable of truthful and convincing revelation and interpretation of life's realities." A review in Exceptional Photoplays stated that "Mr. von Stroheim has always been the realist as Rex Ingram is the romanticist and Griffith the sentimentalist of the screen, and in Greed he has given us an example of realism at its starkest. Like the novel from which the plot was taken, Greed is a terrible and wonderful thing."

=== Box office ===
Greed was a financial disappointment. On its initial run, it earned $224,500 in the United States, $3,063 in Canada and $47,264 in other markets. In total it earned $274,827. Von Stroheim's biographer Arthur Lennig stated that according to MGM's records the final cost of Greed was $546,883. Another biographer, Richard Koszarski, stated that its final cost was $665,603: $585,250 for the production, $30,000 for von Stroheim's personal fee, $54,971 for processing and editing, $53,654 for advertising and $1,726 for Motion Picture dues.

Arthur Lennig asserted that MGM's official budget for Greed was suspiciously high for a film with no stars, no built sets, a small crew and inexpensive film stock. Lennig suspects that MGM averaged the film's cost with the more expensive The Merry Widow in order to prevent von Stroheim from getting a percentage of the more profitable film. The Merry Widow ended up being a hit and earned more profits than Greed had lost; it cost $614,961 but earned $996,226 on its initial run.

== Legacy ==
In his final years, von Stroheim said that "of all my films, only Greed was a fully realized work; only Greed had a total validity." In 1926 a British foundation of arts and sciences requested a copy of the original version of Greed to keep in their archive, but their request was denied by MGM. Henri Langlois screened the studio version of Greed for von Stroheim in 1950. Von Stroheim said, "It was for me an exhumation. It was like opening a coffin in which there was just dust, giving off a terrible stench, a couple of vertebra and a piece of shoulder bone." He went on to say that "It was as if a man's beloved was run over by a truck, maimed beyond recognition. He goes to see her in the morgue. Of course, he still loves her but it's only the memory of her that he can love—because he doesn't recognize her anymore."

In the early 1950s Greed's reputation began to grow and it appeared on several lists of the greatest films ever made. In 1952 at the Festival Mondial du Film et des Beaux Arts de Belgique, Greed was named the fifth greatest film ever made, with such directors as Luchino Visconti, Orson Welles, Luis Buñuel and Billy Wilder voting for it. Later in 1952, Sight and Sound magazine published its first list of the "ten greatest films ever made". Greed was tied for 7th place on that list, with such critics as Andre Bazin, Lotte Eisner, Curtis Harrington, Penelope Houston and Gavin Lambert voting for it. In 1962 it was tied for 4th on the same list. Since 1972 it has failed to reach a spot on the top ten. The Cinémathèque royale de Belgique released a list of "the most important and misappreciated American films of all time" in 1978. Greed was third on its list after Citizen Kane and Sunrise: A Song of Two Humans. In a University of Southern California list of the "50 Most Significant American Films" made by the school's Performing Arts Council, Greed was listed as number 21. In 1991, Greed was selected for preservation in the United States National Film Registry by the Library of Congress as "culturally, historically, or aesthetically significant".

=== Influence ===
Among those who have praised Greed over the years are Sergei Eisenstein; Joseph von Sternberg, who said, "We were all influenced by Greed"; Jean Renoir, who called it "the film of films"; and Ernst Lubitsch, who called von Stroheim "the only true 'novelist'" in films. More recently Guillermo del Toro called it "a perfect reflection of the anxiety permeating the passage into the 20th century and the absolute dehumanization that was to come", and Norbert Pfaffenbichler said that "the last shot of the movie is unforgettable." American writer and critic Susan Sontag named Greed one of her favorite films. Jonathan Rosenbaum has stated that Greed was a major influence on the style and content of many films. Von Stroheim's shots filming the sun predated Akira Kurosawa's better-known uses of the technique in Rashomon (1950). Rosenbaum compared specific shot set-ups in Greed to shots in King Vidor's The Crowd, Jean Renoir's Le Crime de Monsieur Lange, Orson Welles's The Magnificent Ambersons, Howard Hawks' To Have and Have Not and Michelangelo Antonioni's L'Avventura. In addition, he likened certain plot elements or characters in Greed to John Huston's The Treasure of the Sierra Madre (1948), Alfred Hitchcock's Rear Window (1954), Claude Chabrol's Les Bonnes Femmes (1960) and Elaine May's Mikey and Nicky (1975). Rosenbaum singled out von Stroheim's influence on May, an American director, with Mikey and Nicky centering on the disintegration of a friendship over money and sex, and including grotesque elements and characters caught between innocence and corruption. Rosenbaum also asserts that Orson Welles's use of satirical caricatures in all of his films is in "the spirit of von Stroheim".

The two films most commonly compared to Greed are Huston's The Treasure of the Sierra Madre and Welles's The Magnificent Ambersons. Rosenbaum believes that besides Huston's film ending with gold being lost in the desert and similarities between Trina's descent into madness with Fred C. Dobbs own obsessions, the two films have little else in common. The Magnificent Ambersons and Greed both have characters who struggle with class differences that lead to their downfall. Ambersons was famously edited down drastically by its studio and the cut footage is now lost. Rosenbaum goes on to state that Greed influenced the methods in which novels are adapted into films and filmmakers like Welles, Huston and Bill Forsyth followed von Stroheim's example by re-arranging the plot and adding new scenes to their films while still remaining faithful to the intentions of the original novels. In the first chapter of the 1966 serial film Captain Celluloid vs. the Film Pirates, the uncut version of Greed is used as a plot device. The 1994 Jonathan Lynn film Greedy pays tribute to the film by giving the main characters the last name McTeague.

=== Reconstruction ===
Attempts to reconstruct the uncut version of Greed without use of the lost footage first began in 1958. At the Brussels International Exposition, the Cinémathèque royale de Belgique named Greed as one of the twelve greatest films ever made and simultaneously published von Stroheim's original, uncut script for Greed, which came directly from von Stroheim's copy preserved by his widow Denise Vernac. This publication led to three books that used von Stroheim's script to reconstruct the original version of the film and compare it to the released version: a French book edited by Jacques-G. Perret in 1968 and two versions edited by Joel Finler and Herman G. Weinberg, both in 1972. Weinberg's book used 400 individual stills and production photos to reconstruct the uncut version of Greed, the first time that images from the uncut version were publicly available.

In 1999, Turner Entertainment decided to recreate, as closely as possible, the original version by combining the existing footage with over 650 still photographs of the lost scenes (many of which had been used in Weinberg's book), in accordance with an original continuity outline written by von Stroheim. All materials were provided by the Margaret Herrick Library. This restoration runs almost four hours. It was produced by film preservationist Rick Schmidlin and edited by Glenn Morgan. Schmidlin restored many characters and sub-plots from the original version. A new musical score was composed by Robert Israel. The reconstruction cost $100,000 to produce. Schmidlin called the finished product "a reconstruction of Von Stroheim's lost narrative." It premiered at the 1999 Telluride Film Festival and was later screened at the Venice Film Festival and the Pordenone Silent Film Festival before being aired on Turner Classic Movies on December 5, 1999. Film critic Todd McCarthy called the restored version of Greed a triumph. Roger Ebert called Greed a masterpiece and said that the restored Schmidlin cut illustrates the "prudish sensibilities [that] went into MGM's chop job." Rosenbaum praised the project, but claimed it could only be considered a "study version". The reconstruction won a special citation from the Los Angeles Film Critics Association Awards.

== Myths and misconceptions ==
Von Stroheim was known to exaggerate events from his life and create myths about himself, such as his fictitious aristocratic origins and spurious military record in Austria. He claimed that shortly after having moved to the US in the early 1910s, he had found a copy of McTeague in a motel in New York and had read it in one sitting. He also said that wanting to adapt the book inspired him to make a career in filmmaking. Georges Sadoul later stated that von Stroheim had first read the novel in 1914, while living in poverty in Los Angeles.

Claims that von Stroheim's original cut was a completely unabridged version of McTeague are not accurate. Von Stroheim's 300-page script was almost as long as the original novel, but he rethought the entire story and invented new scenes, as well as extensively elaborating existing ones. In the Norris novel, McTeague's back story in Placer County and relationships with his father, mother and Potter were remembered as a flashback and took two paragraphs. In von Stroheim's original Greed, this sequence took up the first hour of the film and was not a flashback. Von Stroheim also modernized the novel's time span to between 1908 and 1923, a quarter-century later than the novel.

Greed has sometimes been said to be over 100 reels long. Von Stroheim said that his initial edit was 42 reels, although several of the people who saw this cut remembered it as being anywhere from 42 to 47 reels. Grant Whytock remembered the edited version that von Stroheim initially sent to him as between 26 and 28 reels. MGM's official studio files list the original cut of the film at 22 reels. As recently as 1992, former MGM Story Editor Samuel Marx erroneously claimed that the original version of Greed was 70 reels.

June Mathis is credited with co-writing the script due to her work on the 10-reel version. Mathis was the head of the Story Department at MGM and her contract stipulated that she would receive writing credit for all MGM films. She did not actually write any part of the screenplay. Mathis is said to have changed the film's title from McTeague to Greed during post-production; however, a publicity still of the cast and crew taken during production clearly indicates that the film was titled Greed before the MGM merger even took place. The film's working title was "Greedy Wives", a nod towards von Stroheim's previous film Foolish Wives; this working title never was considered as the film's actual title.

The original, uncut version of Greed has been called the "holy grail" for film archivists. Over the years, various reports of the original version being uncovered have proved to be unfounded. Among them is a claim that a copy existed in a vault in South America that was screened once a year for invited guests on New Year's Eve. Another claim was that a copy in the possession of a Texan millionaire was sold to Henri Langlois of Cinémathèque Française. A film society in Boston supposedly held a private screening of a print discovered by a World War II veteran in Berlin. Other stories held that David Shepherd of the American Film Institute had found a copy at a garage sale, and that the head of a film society in Redwood City, California, owned "the longest existing version of Greed (purchased in Europe)." Von Stroheim himself once stated that Benito Mussolini owned a personal copy of the film. His son, Joseph von Stroheim, once claimed that when he was in the Army during World War II, he saw a version of the film that took two nights to fully screen, although he could not remember exactly how long it was.

There were several reports that MGM had retained a copy of the original version. Iris Barry of the Museum of Modern Art claimed that a copy was locked in the MGM vaults, although Thalberg denied it. It was also reported that John Houseman had a private screening at MGM and that the studio owned two copies stored in a vault in a Utah salt mine. Lotte Eisner once claimed that sometime during the 1950s and 1960s, several film cans labeled "McTeague" were found in MGM's vaults and destroyed by executives who did not know that it was footage from Greed. MGM executive Al Lewin said that several years after the film's release, von Stroheim asked him for the cut footage; Lewin and editor Margaret Booth supposedly searched MGM's vault but could not find any missing footage.

== See also ==
- List of early color feature films
- List of fiction works made into feature films
- List of films cut over the director's opposition
- List of incomplete or partially lost films
- List of longest films

== Bibliography ==
- Curtiss, Thomas Quinn (1971). Von Stroheim. New York, New York: Farrar, Straus and Giroux. ISBN 978-0-374-28520-3.
- Finler, Joel W. (1972). Greed. A Film. New York: Lorrimer Publishing Ltd. ISBN 978-0-900855-45-0.
- Finler, Joel W. (1968). Stroheim. Berkeley, California: University of California Press. ASIN B003G8IMK8.
- Flamini, Roland (1994). Thalberg: The Last Tycoon and the World of M-G-M. New York: Crown Publisher, Inc. ISBN 0-517-58640-1.
- Koszarski, Richard (1983). The Man You Loved to Hate: Erich von Stroheim and Hollywood. Oxford, England: Oxford University Press. ISBN 978-0-19-503239-0.
- Lennig, Arthur (2000). Stroheim. Lexington, Kentucky: The University Press of Kentucky. ISBN 978-0-8131-2138-3.
- Rosenbaum, Jonathan (1993). Greed. London: BFI Publishing. ISBN 978-0-85170-358-9.
- Vieira, Mark A. (2010). Irving Thalberg: Boy Wonder to Producer Prince. Los Angeles: University of California Press. ISBN 978-0-520-26048-1.
- Wakeman, John (1987). World Film Directors, Volume 1. New York: The H. W. Wilson Company. ISBN 978-0-8242-0757-1.
- Weinberg, Herman G. (1972). The Complete Greed of Erich Von Stroheim: a reconstruction of the film in 348 still photos following the original screenplay plus 52 production stills. New York: ARNO Press. ISBN 978-0-405-03925-6.
