= McTeague =

1899 novel by Frank Norris

- Author: Frank Norris
- Language: English
- Genre: Naturalism
- Publisher: Doubleday & McClure
- Publication date: 1899
- Publication place: United States

McTeague: A Story of San Francisco, otherwise known as simply McTeague, is a novel by Frank Norris, first published in 1899. It tells the story of a couple's courtship and marriage, and their subsequent descent into poverty and violence as the result of jealousy and greed. The book was the basis for the films McTeague (1916) and Erich von Stroheim's Greed (1924). It was also adapted as an opera by William Bolcom in 1992.

== Plot summary ==
McTeague is a dentist of limited intellect from a poor miner's family who has opened a dentist shop on Polk Street in San Francisco (his first name is never revealed; other characters in the novel call him simply "Mac."). His best friend, Marcus Schouler, brings his cousin, Trina Sieppe, whom he is courting, to McTeague's parlor for dental work. McTeague becomes infatuated with Trina while working on her teeth, and Marcus graciously steps aside. McTeague successfully woos Trina. Shortly after the two kiss and declare their love for each other, Trina discovers that she has won $5,000 (roughly $187,000 in 2024 values) from a lottery ticket. In the celebration, Trina's mother, Mrs. Sieppe, announces that McTeague and Trina are to marry. Marcus becomes jealous of McTeague and claims that he has been cheated out of money that would have been rightfully his if he had married Trina.

The marriage takes place, and Mrs. Sieppe and the rest of Trina's family move away from San Francisco, leaving her alone with McTeague. Trina is a thrifty wife; she refuses to touch the principal of her $5,000, which she invests with her uncle. She insists that she and McTeague must live on the earnings from McTeague's dental practice, the small income from the $5,000 investment, and the money she earns from carving small wooden figures of Noah's animals and his Ark for sale in her uncle's shop. Secretly, she accumulates penny-pinched savings in a locked trunk. Though the couple is happy, the friendship between Marcus and McTeague deteriorates. More than once, the two men come to blows; each time, McTeague's immense physical strength prevails, and eventually, he breaks Marcus's arm in a fight. When Marcus recovers, he goes south, intending to become a rancher; before he leaves, he visits McTeague, and he and McTeague part apparently as friends.

A catastrophe strikes when McTeague is debarred from practicing dentistry by the authorities. It becomes clear that Marcus has taken revenge on McTeague before leaving by informing City Hall that he has no license or academic degree. McTeague loses his practice, and the couple is forced to move into successively poorer quarters as Trina becomes more and more miserly. Their life together deteriorates, with McTeague escalating his abuse until he steals all of Trina's domestic savings of $400 (roughly $15,000 in 2024 values) and abandons her. Meanwhile, Trina falls entirely under the spell of money and withdraws the principal of her prior winnings in gold from her uncle's firm so she can admire and handle the coins in her room, at one point spreading them over her bed and rolling around in them.

When McTeague returns, destitute once more, Trina refuses to give him money, even for food. McTeague angrily beats her to death. He then takes the entire hoard of gold and heads to a mining community he had left years prior. Sensing pursuit, he makes his way south towards Mexico. Meanwhile, Marcus hears of the murder and joins the manhunt for McTeague, finally catching him in Death Valley. In the middle of the desert, Marcus and McTeague fight over McTeague's remaining water and Trina's $5,000. McTeague mortally wounds Marcus, but as he dies, Marcus handcuffs himself to McTeague. The final dramatic image of the novel is one of McTeague stranded, alone, and helpless. He is left with only the company of Marcus's corpse, to whom he is handcuffed, in the desolate, arid waste of Death Valley.

== Background ==
Frank Norris wrote McTeague in the San Francisco of the 1890s, and much of the book uses the local detail of this setting. He began the novel when at the English Department of Harvard University in 1895, although the bulk of the work was written in 1897. McTeague's murder of Trina is believed to be based on the murder of Mrs Sarah Collins, who was killed in late 1893 by her husband after she refused to give him money. He was also greatly influenced by the realism and plotting of the novels of Emile Zola. In researching the terminology and practices of dentistry, Norris predominantly used Thomas Fillebrown's A Text-book of Operative Dentistry.

== Adaptations ==
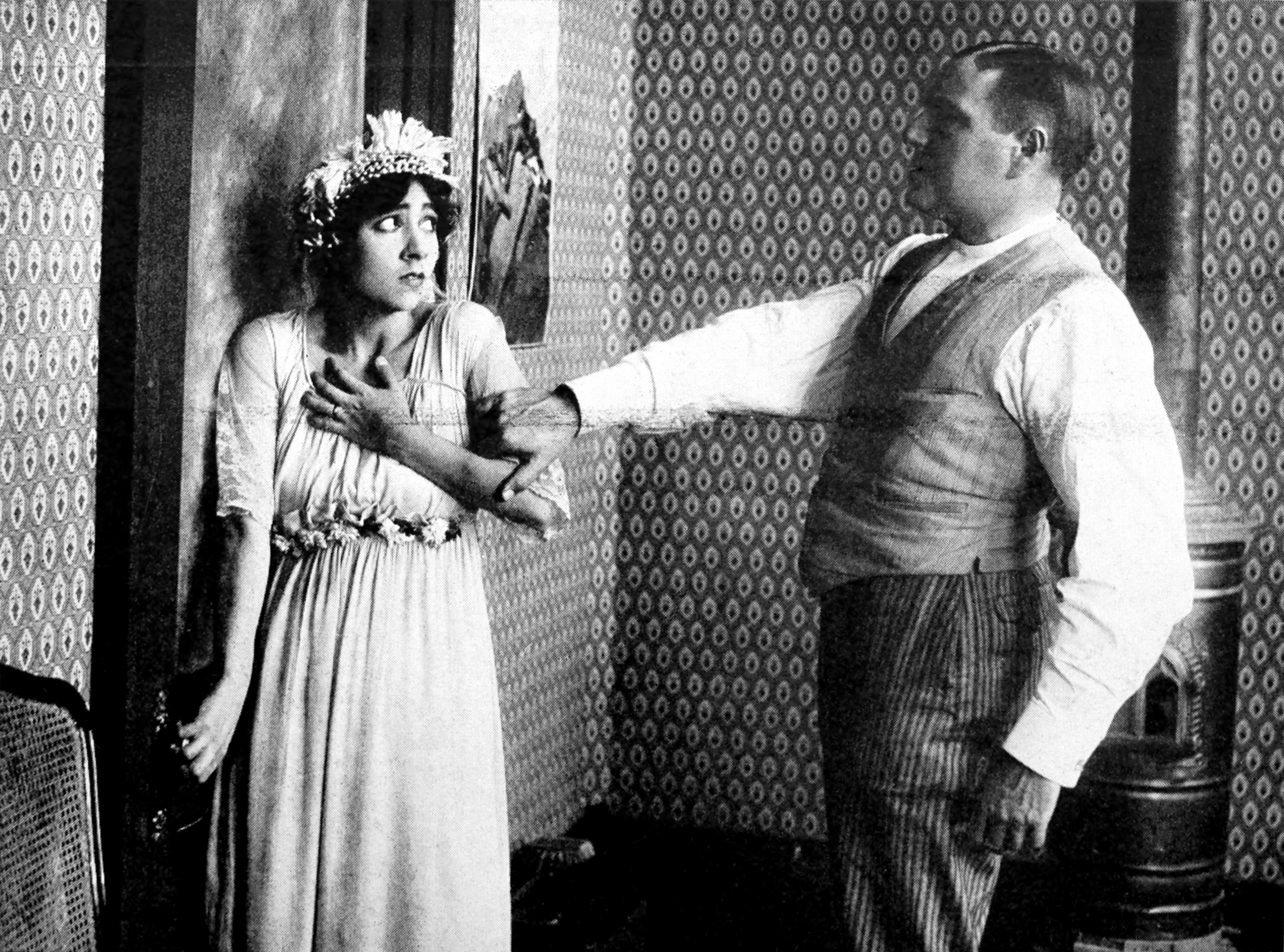
Fania Marinoff and Holbrook Blinn in Life's Whirlpool (1916).

- McTeague (also known as Life's Whirlpool) starring Holbrook Blinn and Fania Marinoff was released in 1916. It is considered a lost film.
- Greed, Erich von Stroheim's film version of McTeague, was made in 1924. In its original form, it lasted approximately eight hours but was cut drastically by the studio, MGM, and most of the excised footage has been lost. The first name of "Mac" McTeague in Greed is John.
- Karen Kearns produced a radio drama version of McTeague in 1989, under a fellowship for the Corporation for Public Broadcasting. The program features Stacy Keach, Carol Kane, Hector Elizondo, JoBeth Williams, Michael York, Katherine Helmond, Ed Asner, Joe Spano, and many other well-known actors.
- McTeague was the basis of an opera of the same name by composer William Bolcom and librettist Arnold Weinstein, which premiered on October 31, 1992.
- Greedy is a 1994 American comedy film directed by Jonathan Lynn and written by Lowell Ganz and Babaloo Mandel. The film stars Michael J. Fox, Kirk Douglas, and Nancy Travis, with Phil Hartman, Ed Begley Jr., Olivia d'Abo, Colleen Camp, and Bob Balaban appearing in supporting roles. The original music score was composed by Randy Edelman. It is a very loose adaptation of McTeague.
- Slow Burn is a 2000 drama film directed by Christian Ford and starring Minnie Driver, James Spader, Stuart Wilson, and Josh Brolin. It is a very loose adaptation of McTeague.
