= Samarang (film) =

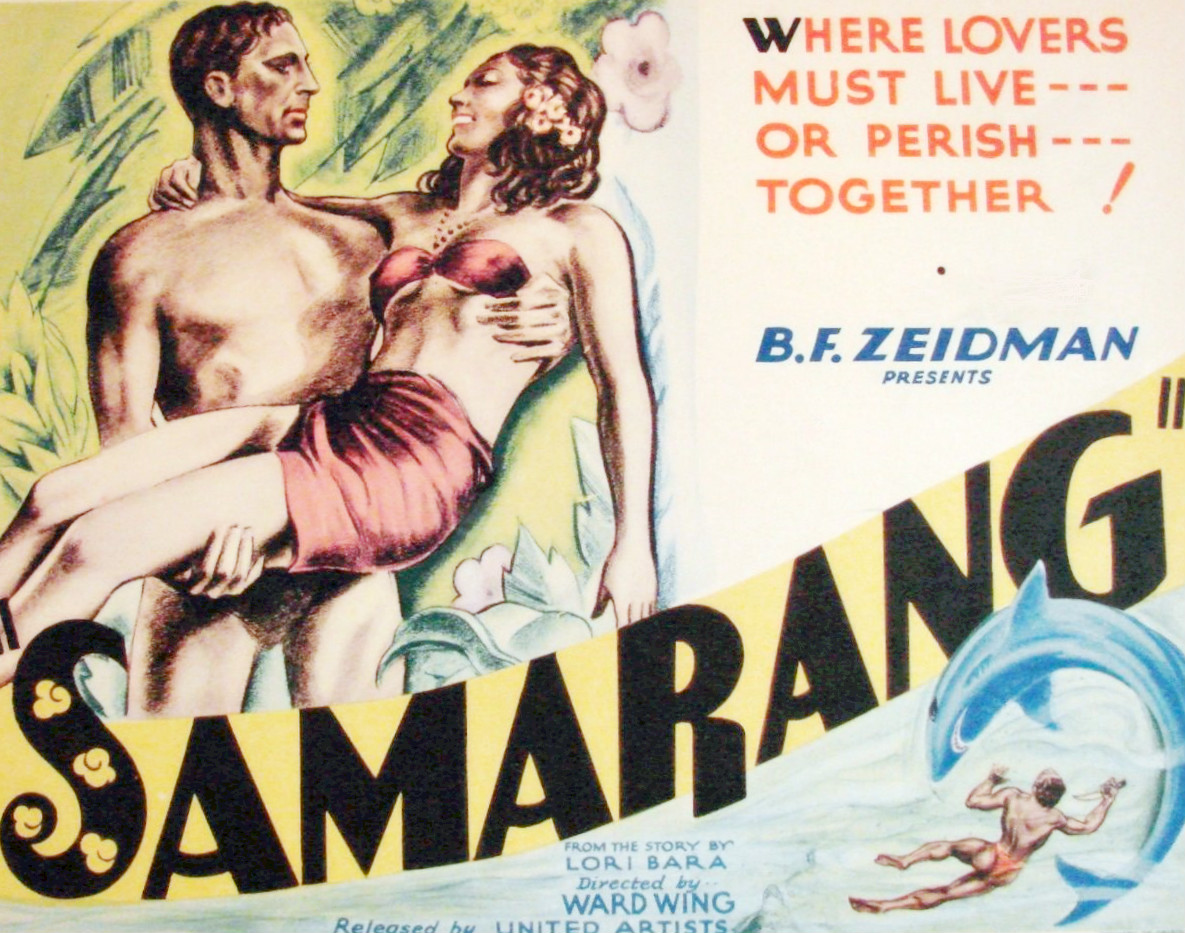
- Lobby card
- Directed by: Ward Wing
- Screenplay by: Thomas J. Geraghty
- Story by: Lori Bara
- Produced by: B.F. Zeidman
- Cinematography: John C. Clark
- Edited by: Thomas J. Geraghty
- Music by: Sam Wineland
- Production company: B.F. Zeidman Productions
- Distributed by: United Artists
- Release date: June 28, 1933
- Running time: 59 minutes
- Country: United States
- Language: English

Samarang is a 1933 American Pre-Code action film directed by Ward Wing and written by Thomas J. Geraghty. The film was released on June 28, 1933, by United Artists. Its copyright was registered in 1933 but was not renewed, so the film is in the public domain. The film, although apparently meant to be set in Indonesia (then the Dutch East Indies) was filmed in Singapore and Malaysia.

== Plot ==
On an island called Samarang, in a village of fishermen, Ahman falls in love with Sai-Yu, the daughter of a local chieftain. To improve his social status and be able to marry her, Ahman joins an expedition to the Forbidden Lagoon of Sakai, where big pearls are said to abound. But the waters are infested with ferocious sharks.

== List of characters ==
- Ahmang, the Pearl Diver – played by Albert Victor Cockle
- Sai-Yu, his love interest, Sweetheart – played by Therese Seth
- Chang-Fu, the Captain
- Mamounah, the Mother
- Ko-Hal, the Brother

== Production ==
With its exotic location, Samarang followed the formula of other educational films of that time, mixing footage of factual cultural scenes with its fictional romance story, and as an American ethnographic film included displays of nudity that were considered acceptable.

Director Ward used Sakai extras for the film, but it was difficult finding a translator. The only person he could find that spoke Sakai was a Chinese man who didn't speak English, so he had to hire a Malay to interpret into Chinese, so the Chinese man could translate into Sakai. Cockle, the lead actor, also assisted in translating into Malay. Additional Tamil language translators were also brought in.

== Cast ==
=== Albert Victor Cockle ===
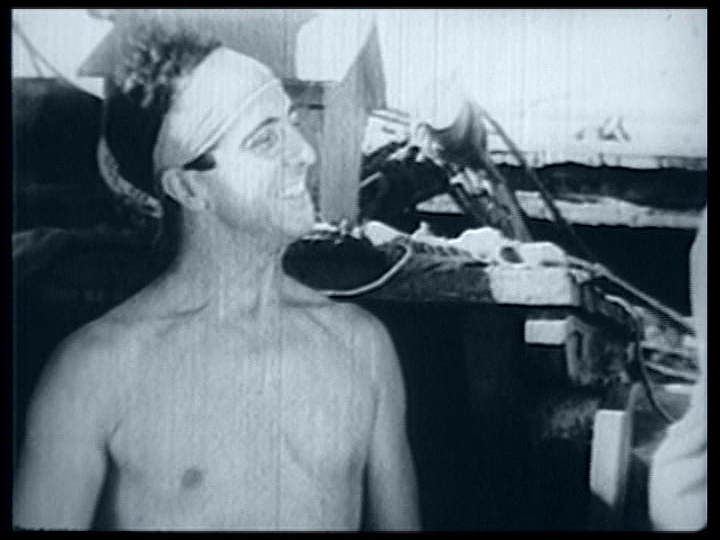
Ahmang as The Pearl Diver, played by Albert Victor Cockle, a member of the Straits Settlements Police Force, and later the Chief of the Naval Police just before the start of World War II.

The lead actor, Cockle, was an actively serving member of the Straits Settlements Police Force at the time of filming. Before the film's release, he was already a Chief Inspector of Police for the Singapore Police – one of the main branches of the Straits Settlements Police. He spent much of his career in the Harbour Board Police. He was often involved in seizing illegal items found on the docks or at sea. He had a knack for saving people from drowning, even when he was dressed in his full uniform. He also raided gambling dens, danced cabaret, led the funeral procession for a murdered officer, and was eventually made Captain of the Naval Police. In 1924, while he had been serving in the Penang Police for the Straits Settlements Police Force, he personally protected the King of Siam through his territory.

=== Therese Seth ===
Seth was a local dancer who had played with Cockle in a few stage performances before the film. She was Eurasian, of Armenian descent.

== See also ==
- Nudity in film
