= Lori Bara =

American screenwriter and actress

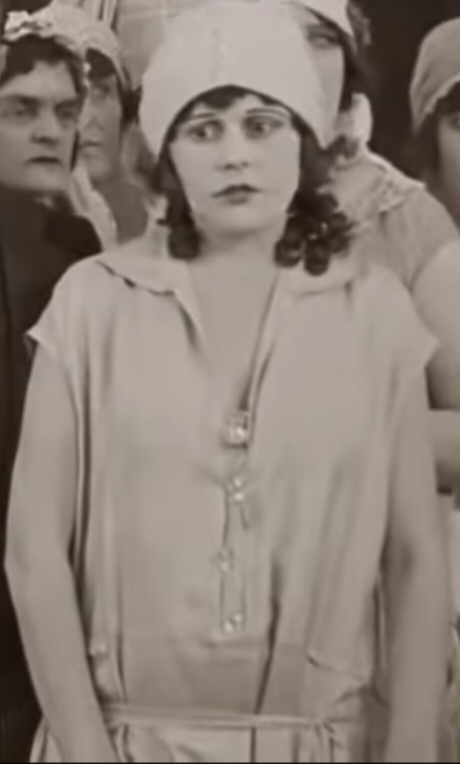
- Lori Bara in the 1925 film Seven Chances
- Born: 30 October 1897; Cincinnati, Ohio, US
- Died: 4 August 1965 (aged 67)
- Occupations: Actress and screenwriter
- Notable work: Samarang (film); The Soul of Buddha (film)
- Relatives: Theda Bara (sister)

Lori Bara (born Esther de Coppet Bara Goodman; 30 October 1897 – 4 August 1965) was an American screenwriter and actress. She is best known for her work as a writer and scenarist on the films Samarang (1933) and The Soul of Buddha (1918).

== Early life ==
Bara was born in the Avondale neighborhood of Cincinnati, Ohio. Her father, Bernard Goodman, was a prosperous Jewish tailor originally from Poland. Her mother, Pauline Louise Françoise (née de Coppett; 1861–1957), was born in Switzerland.

After her older sister Theodosia achieved fame under the stage name Theda Bara, the family legally adopted the surname Bara.

== Career ==
Bara worked in the American film industry as both an actress and a screenwriter.

== Filmography ==
=== As writer ===
- The Soul of Buddha (1918)
- Samarang (1933) (story)
- Hate in Paradise (originally Tea Leaves in the Wind) (1938)

=== As actress ===
- Seven Chances (1925) – Mother of underage girl (uncredited)
- Tell It to the Marines (1926) – Navy nurse (uncredited)

== Personal life ==
For a time, Bara shared a two-bedroom apartment with the actress Nola Luxford on Ivar Avenue in Hollywood.

In 1920, Bara married Francis W. Getty, a journalist with the London bureau of The New York Times, in London. Contemporary reports noted that the couple met aboard the steamship Vestris. The marriage ended in divorce.

In 1927, Bara married director, actor, and writer Ward Wing in Tijuana. A report in The Film Mercury called the pair a writing team for MGM in 1930. The marriage ended in divorce.

Following the death of her sister Theda in 1955, Lori inherited the majority of her estate, valued at approximately $100,000 at the time. Upon her own death, Lori bequeathed $222,000 to the Samuel Goldwyn Foundation in memory of her sister.
