= The Soul of Buddha =

1918 film directed by J. Gordon Edwards

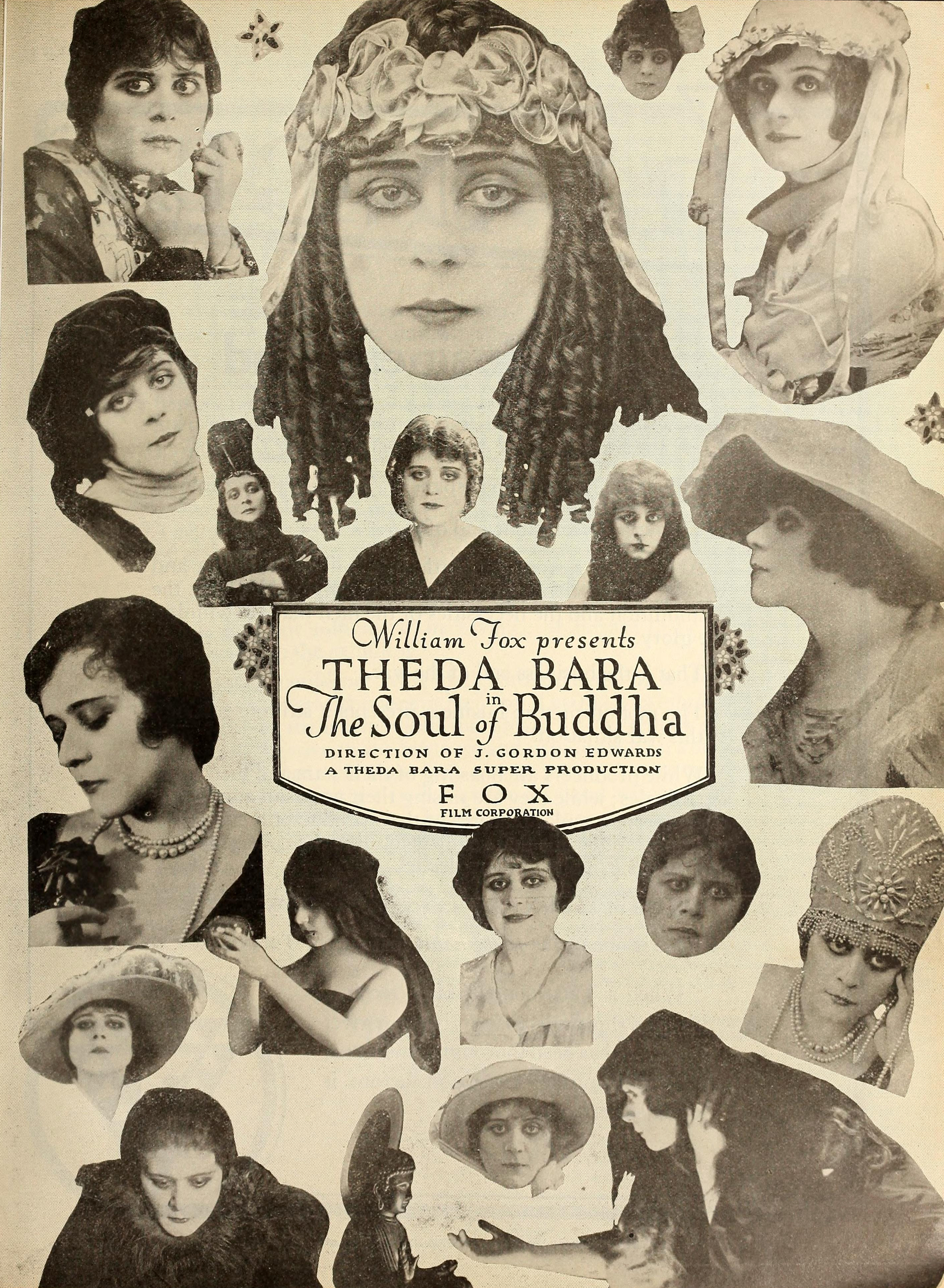
- Advertisement
- Directed by: J. Gordon Edwards
- Written by: Adrian Johnson, Lori Bara
- Story by: Theda Bara
- Produced by: William Fox
- Starring: Theda Bara; Victor Kennard
- Cinematography: John W. Boyle
- Distributed by: Fox Film Corporation
- Release date: April 21, 1918
- Running time: 50 minutes (5 reels)
- Country: United States
- Language: Silent (English intertitles)

The Soul of Buddha is a 1918 American silent romance film directed by J. Gordon Edwards and starring Theda Bara, who also wrote the film's story. The film was produced by Fox Film Corporation and shot at the Fox Studio in Fort Lee, New Jersey.

== Plot ==
As described in a film magazine, fascinated by the lure of white robes and dancing, Bava (Bara) enters the Temple of Buddha. She is soon disillusioned and, yielding to the entreaties of Major John Dare (Thompson) of the British army, she flees with him and becomes his wife, incurring the enmity of Ysora (Kennard), high priest from the temple. A child is born to the two but is later found dead with the Buddhist death mark on its forehead. This withers the soul of Bava, who leads her husband around the globe in search of happiness. Hardened by sorrow, she turns against Dare and bids him gone. At a Paris resort she meets a theatrical manager (Warwick) who is fascinated by her dancing. She accepts an offer to appear at his theater. At the night of her premiere her husband attempts a reconciliation, but is unsuccessful and kills himself in her dressing room. At the end of her dance Bava meets her death at the hands of Ysora.

== Cast ==
- Theda Bara as Bava, The Priestess
- Victor Kennard as Ysora
- Florence Martin as Romaine's Wife
- Tony Merlo as Count Romaine (credited as Anthony Merlo)
- Jack Ridgeway as Wife's Father (credited as Jack Ridgway)
- Hugh Thompson as Sir John Dare
- Henry Warwick as Stage Manager

== Reception ==
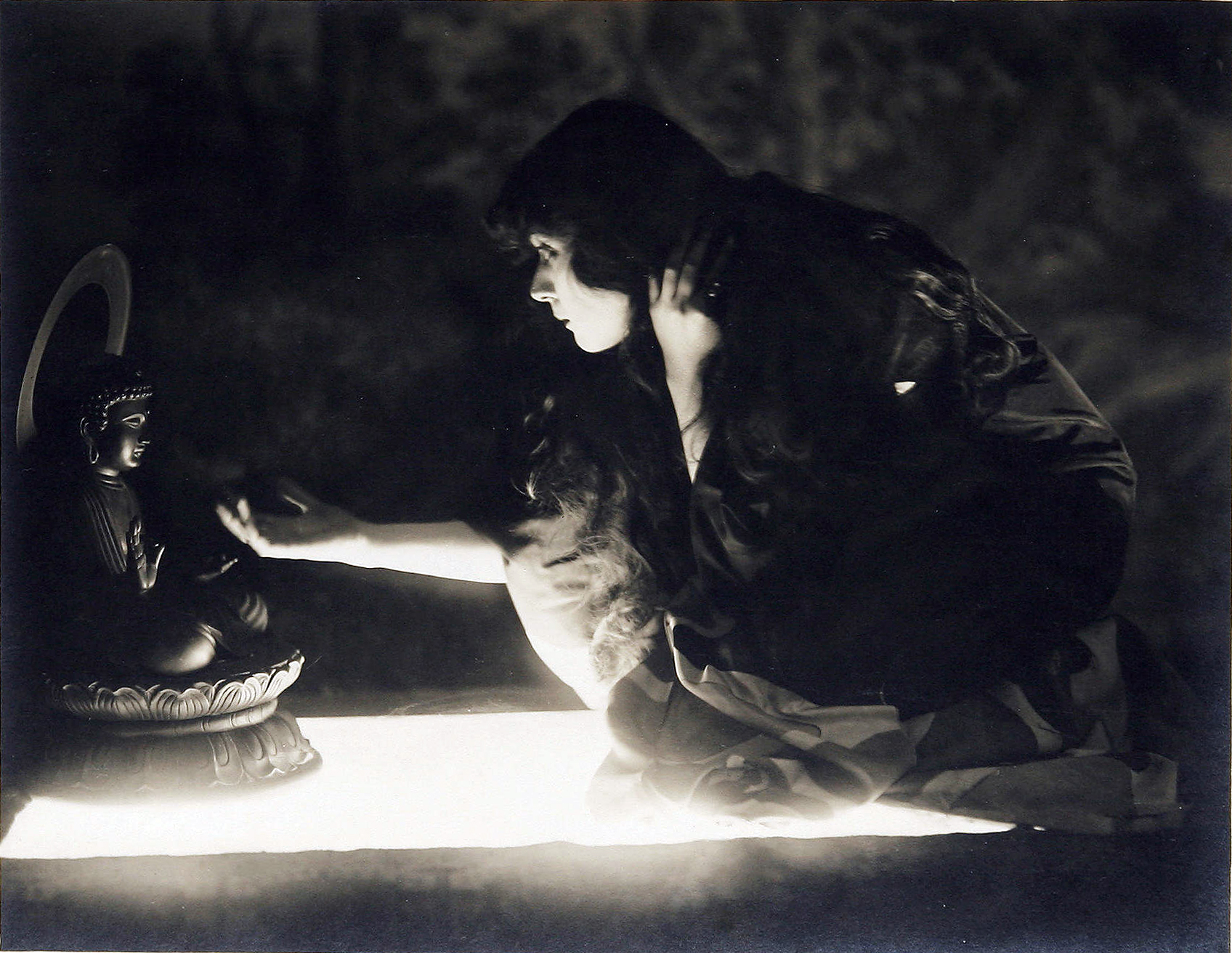
Film still

Like many American films of the time, The Soul of Buddha was subject to cuts by city and state film censorship boards. For example, the Chicago Board of Censors required a cut, in Reel 3, of the attack on the servant woman, all views of woman's leg exposed above the knee, in the Apache dance eliminate all views of Apache framing blonde woman's face with hands and wiggling her in close embrace, man kissing woman's arm and love scene following, and, Reel 5, stabbing of dancer.

== Preservation status ==
The Soul of Buddha was considered to be a lost film, until November 3, 2025 when a 23 second clip from the film showing Bara smoking while being serenaded by Tony Merlo alongside Victor Kennard entering the room and bowing was found in the documentary Theda Bara et William Fox (2001).

== See also ==
- List of lost films
- 1937 Fox vault fire
