= Tea Leaves in the Wind =

- Directed by: Ward Wing
- Written by: Lori Bara
- Produced by: A. Barr-Smith; Neville Clark
- Starring: Nils Asther; Eve Shelley; Gibson Gowland
- Production company: Chesterfield Films
- Distributed by: British Screen Service
- Release date: November 1938
- Running time: 62 minutes
- Country: United Kingdom
- Language: English

Tea Leaves in the Wind is a 1938 British drama film directed by Ward Wing and starring Nils Asther, Eve Shelley and Gibson Gowland. It was shot on location in Ceylon.

== Cast ==
- Nils Asther as Tony Drake
- Eve Shelley as Margot Hastings
- Gibson Gowland as David Webster
- Cyril Chadwick
- Needham Clarke
- Robert Anthony
- Marjorie Preece

== Bibliography ==
- Low, Rachael. Filmmaking in 1930s Britain. George Allen & Unwin, 1985.
- Wood, Linda. British Films, 1927-1939. British Film Institute, 1986.
