= Fania Marinoff =

American actress (1890–1971)

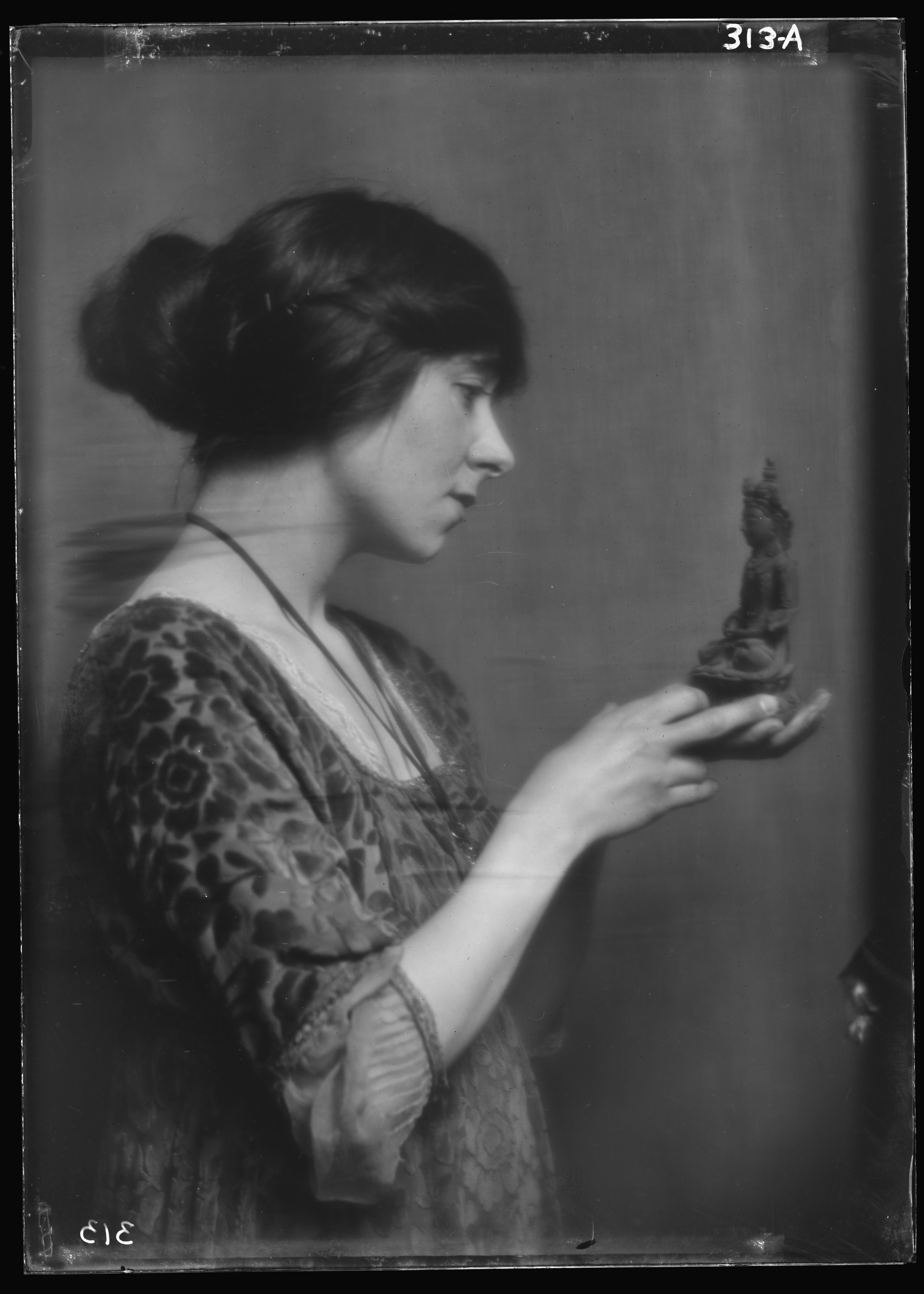
- Marinoff by Arnold Genthe, 1913
- Born: March 20, 1890; Odessa, Russian Empire
- Died: November 17, 1971 (aged 81); Englewood, New Jersey, US
- Citizenship: American
- Occupation: Actress
- Spouse: Carl Van Vechten (m. 1914; died 1964)
- Relatives: Jacob Marinoff (brother)

Fania Marinoff (Russian: Фаня Маринов; Yiddish: פאַניאַ מאַרינאָוו; March 20, 1890 – November 17, 1971) was a Russian-born American actress.

== Life ==
Marinoff was born in Odessa in the Russian Empire (present-day Ukraine) on March 20, 1890. She was born into a Jewish household, and she was the thirteenth child and seventh daughter born to Mayer and Leah Marinoff, who died shortly after she was born. At age 6, Marinoff, who was nicknamed Fanny as a child, was smuggled on board an overcrowded passenger ship headed to America. She arrived in Boston where she lived undernourished and uneducated. At the age of 8, Marinoff was sent to live with her older brother, Michael. While living with him and his wife, Marinoff was tortured on a regular basis. She was locked in dark rooms, which were infested with rats, for hours on end. A year later, Marinoff made her stage debut as a little boy in Cyrano de Bergerac at the El Itch Theater. This launched the beginning of what would be a 50-year career.

In 1914, Marinoff married American writer and photographer Carl Van Vechten. The two were introduced through mutual friends in the summer of 1912 in New York City. Shortly after meeting, they formed a strong bond. Within the first year together, Van Vechten told Marinoff that she was more than he could have dreamed of, saying she was "the only one that I have ever found who completely satisfies me." From the beginning of their relationship, Marinoff was aware of Van Vechten's homosexual desires. Although Marinoff had attained great recognition before meeting Van Vechten, once married, she found herself living in Van Vechten's shadow. To many she was known as simply "Carlo's wife". The couple played a prominent role in the Harlem Renaissance.

Nella Larsen dedicated her book Passing to Marinoff and Van Vechten.

== Career (1903–1945) ==
Marinoff played supporting and lead roles in dozens of Broadway plays between 1903 and 1937, seven U.S. silent movies between 1914 and 1917, and three short films in 1915.

Marinoff was an actress and dancer for almost 50 years. Her career bloomed when she became the lead actress in the Greenwich Village Players. She was well known for her movie roles in One of Our Girls (1914), The Galloper (1915) and Life's Whirlpool (1917). On stage, she played lead in the original play Karen (1918) as well as Antony and Cleopatra (1937) and Pillars of Society (1931).

During her career, she took an eight-year break because of her heavy drinking, she told an interviewer. In the last few years of her career, she volunteered at the Stage Door Canteen entertaining troops from 1942 to 1945. After retiring from acting, she and her husband remained active in artistic circles.

== Death ==
Marinoff died in 1971 in Englewood, New Jersey, from pneumonia.

== Partial filmography ==
- One of Our Girls (1914)
- The Unsuspected Isles (1915)
- Nedra (1915)
- The Money Master (1915)
- McTeague (1916)
- New York (1916)
- The Rise of Jennie Cushing (1917)
