= Van Dam =

van Dam ("of the dam" or "of the water") is a Dutch toponymic surname. van is akin to the German nobility von and English House of, while Dam derives its name from the dams in Amsterdam, Netherlands' capital and most populated city.

In some cases, especially when entered by newer immigration ports, the name developed into the derivative, "VanDam."

== Places ==
- Amsterdam, Netherlands' capital and most populated city, founded c. 1275
- Dam Square, dam and town square in the Netherlands, founded c. 1275
- The New Netherlanders founded New Amsterdam and New Netherland in 1609, via the Halve Maen (English: "Half Moon") ship to modern-day New York Bay, which preceded the Pilgrims sailing attempt before reaching Cape Cod, Massachusetts in 1620 and English colonizers renaming the land to New York City in 1665.
- Fort Amsterdam, the center of trade and administrative headquarters for the Dutch on the southern tip of Manhattan Island at the confluence of the Hudson and East rivers, established 1625
- The historic Vandam Street in the Charlton-King-Vandam Historic District in Greenwich Village, New York City, dedicated in 1966.
- Vandam, a village in Azerbaijan

== People ==
- Andries van Dam (b. 1938), Dutch-born American computer scientist
- Carlo van Dam (b. 1986), Dutch racing driver
- Cornelis Van Dam (b. 1946), Canadian Old Testament scholar
- Cornelis P. G. van Dam (b. 1954), Professor of Mechanical & Aerospace Engr., University of California, Davis
- Danielle van Dam (1994–2002), American murder victim
- Dave Van Dam (1955–2018), American voice impressionist
- Douwe Casparus van Dam (1827–1898), Dutch naturalist, explorer and museum curator
- Gwen Van Dam (1928–2024), American actress
- Jan Albertsz van Dam (1670–1746), Dutch mathematician and astronomer
- Johannes van Dam (1946–2013), Dutch journalist and food writer
- John Van Dam (born 1984), American football player and coach
- José van Dam (1940–2026), Belgian bass-baritone
- Joseph Van Dam (1901–1986), Belgian road cyclist
- Lex van Dam (b. 1968), Dutch hedge fund manager
- Lloyd van Dams (b. 1972), Dutch–Surinamese kickboxer
- Luc van Dam (1920–1976), Dutch boxer
- Marcel van Dam (b. 1938), Dutch sociologist, politician and television presenter
- Marinus van Dam (1929–1997), Dutch-born American inventor of the jelly belly bean and founder of Marich Confectionery
- Martijn van Dam (b. 1978), Dutch engineer and politician
- Max van Dam (1910–1943), Dutch painter
- Nicolette van Dam (b. 1984), Dutch actress
- Nikolaos van Dam (b. 1945), Dutch diplomat and Middle East expert
- Paul Van Dam (born 1937), Utah politician
- Rijk van Dam (born 1952), Dutch politician
- Rip Van Dam (c.1660-1749), New York Province politician
- Rob Van Dam (b. 1970), American professional wrestler
- Stephan Van Dam (b. 1959), American cartographer, graphic designer, information architect, and owner of NYC map publisher, vanDam.com which publishes the patented pop-up maps (or unfolds) and HistoryMapped
- Thijs van Dam (b, 1997), Dutch field hockey player
- Tonie van Dam (b. 1960), American geophysicist and geodesist

=== Derivatives ===
The forms VanDam, Vandam, Vandamm, and Vandamme are often indicative of a family of Dutch or Flemish origin which had lived for generations in a non-Dutch speaking environment, for example:

- Albert Dresden Vandam (1843–1903), English journalist and writer
- Jerry Vandam (b. 1988), Ghanaian-French footballer
- Kevin VanDam (b. 1967), American fisherman
- Major William Vandam, fictional British officer in Ken Follett's The Key to Rebecca
- Phillip Vandamm, fictional spy in Hitchcock's North by Northwest

== Animals ==
- Van Dam's vanga, a bird named after Douwe Casparus van Dam

== See also ==
- van (Dutch)
- von
- House of
- Dam, Danish surname
