= Candyman (2010 film) =

- Directed by: Costa Botes
- Starring: David Klein; Weird Al Yankovic
- Release date: 2010

Candyman is a documentary film by director Costa Botes about the rise and fall of David Klein, the man who developed and was the original copyright owner of Jelly Belly jelly beans. Klein went on to adopt the title of Candyman in his Candyman Kitchens business once his non-compete clause was up following sale of the Jelly Belly copyright.

The film heavily features David Klein and his son Bert Klein, but also includes interviews from then partner and supplier Herman Goelitz Candy Company (now renamed Jelly Belly) as well as Weird Al Yankovic.

The film was featured in at the Slamdance Film Festival where it averaged 4.16 out of 5 stars in audience reviews, Hot Docs Canadian International Documentary Festival in Toronto, Rincon International Film Festival in Puerto Rico and the Omaha Film Festival in Omaha, Nebraska, all in 2010. It received mixed reviews from critics earning a B+ rating from The A.V. Club and 6 out of 10 stars from PopMatters and 2 out of 5 stars from Reel Film.
