= Van Damme (disambiguation) =

Jean-Claude Van Damme (born 1960) is a Belgian martial artist and actor.

Van Damme may also refer to:

== People ==
- Albert Van Damme (born 1940), Belgian cyclo-crosser
- Alexandre Van Damme (born 1962), Belgian businessman
- Anja Van Damme (born 1986), Belgian volleyball player
- Art Van Damme (1920–2010), American jazz accordionist
- Charles Van Damme (born 1946), Belgian cinematographer and director
- Didier Van Damme (born 1929), composer
- Eric van Damme, (born 1956), Dutch economist
- Evy Van Damme (born 1980), Belgian cyclist
- Frans Van Damme (1858–1925), Belgian painter
- Ivo Van Damme (1954–1976), Belgian athlete
- Jef Van Damme (born 1979), Belgian politician
- Jelle Van Damme (born 1983), Belgian footballer
- Jeroen van Damme (born 1972), Dutch athlete
- Joachim Van Damme (born 1991), Belgian footballer
- Johannes van Damme (1935–1994), Dutch engineer executed in Singapore for drug smuggling
- Koen van Damme (born 1987), Belgian gymnast
- Maurice Van Damme (born 1888), Belgian fencer
- Miguel Van Damme (1993–2022), Belgian footballer
- Phumzile van Damme (born 1983), South African politician
- Stéphane Van Damme (born 1969), French historian

== Entertainment ==
- Jean-Claude Van Damme: Behind Closed Doors, a British television reality show around the eponymous person
- Capheus "Van Damme" Onyango, a character in the television series Sense8

== Other uses ==
- Memorial Van Damme, an annual athletics event in Brussels, Belgium
- Van Damme State Park, Mendocino County, California

== See also ==
- Damme (disambiguation)
- Van Dam, a surname
- Van Damm, a surname
- Vandamme, a surname
