= Marinus van Dam =

Dutch businessman (1929–1997)

Marinus van Dam (October 24, 1929 – January 6, 1997) was one of the first employees at The Herman Goelitz Candy Company. He is considered by some sources to have been the inventor of the jelly belly jelly bean.

Marinus van Dam was born in Ooltgensplaat, a township in Oostflakkee, Netherlands. He immigrated to the United States after obtaining a candy manufacturing degree in the Netherlands and soon went to work for the Herman Goelitz candy company after arriving in the United States. He rose to the level of vice president before moving on to other companies and finally starting his own business Marich Confectionery.

When Marinus was asked how he developed the manufacturing of the Jelly Belly, he answered that most jelly beans at the time were cheap candy that had a 56% sugar content and were sold as penny candy. All jelly beans started out with plain, uncolored starch centers that were merely sweetened with sugar. Only the outer candy coating was colored and flavored. He wondered how he could bring this candy to the adult market which David Klein had envisioned, and his solution was to enhance the jelly beans so that they would appeal to everyone. The centers for the new jelly bean were colored and flavored with real fruit juices and natural flavors. This flavor enhancing process was also used on the outer candy shell. The finished Jelly Belly contained about half the sugar of the regular jelly bean, was more flavorful, and consequently healthier than the generic jelly beans sold in stores. Marinus developed the recipes under David Klein's direction of concept. David Klein's the inventor and founder of Jelly Belly® jelly beans .David Klein sold the first Jelly Belly jelly beans in a small ice cream parlor in Alhambra, California in 1976. The first flavors were Very Cherry, Tangerine, Lemon, Green Apple, Grape, Licorice, Root Beer, and Cream Soda. Marinus died on January 6, 1997, but the candy he helped create continues.
