= Dam (surname) =

Dam is a Danish and Faroese surname. It is a toponymic surname and means 'pond' in Danish. Notable people with the surname include:

- Atli Dam (1932–2005), Prime Minister of the Faroe Islands
- Henrik Dam (1895–1976), Danish biochemist, Nobel Prize winner
- Jan Dam (footballer) (born 1968), Faroese footballer
- Jan Dam (boxer) (1905–1985), Belgian boxer
- Kenneth W. Dam (1932–2022), American lawyer and politician
- Peter Mohr Dam (1898–1968), Prime Minister of the Faroe Islands
- Rigmor Dam (born 1971), Faroese politician
- Thomas Dam (1909–1986), inventor of the troll doll

== See also ==
- Dams (surname), northern-European surname
- van Dam, Dutch surname
- van Damm, Dutch surname
- van Damme (disambiguation), Dutch surname
