= Garfield Avenue (Los Angeles County) =

Coordinates: 34.161243°N 118.143836°W

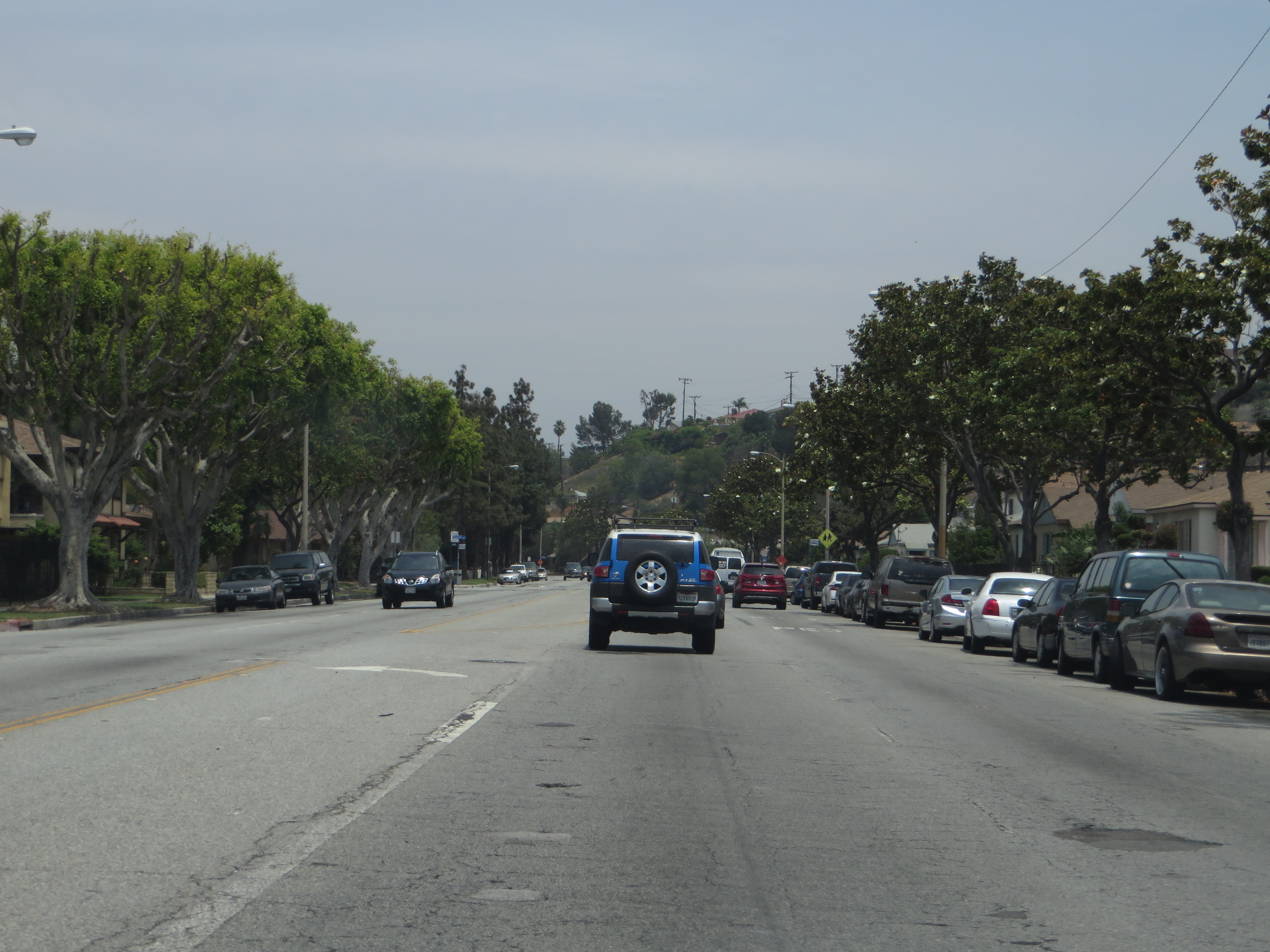
Garfield Avenue in Montebello, California

Garfield Avenue (also known as Cherry Avenue) is a major north-south street in Los Angeles County, California, US.

== Background ==
The avenue lies between Atlantic Boulevard and Rosemead/Lakewood Boulevard. It begins as Garfield Avenue as a minor street north of Grevelia Street in South Pasadena. It runs through cities like South Pasadena, Alhambra, Monterey Park, Montebello, Commerce, Bell Gardens, South Gate, on way to Paramount before it changes to Cherry Avenue on entrance to Long Beach, Lakewood, and Signal Hill, ending at Ocean Boulevard.

Garfield Avenue/Cherry Avenue intersects with the following freeways:

- Interstate 10, San Bernardino Freeway
- State Route 60, Pomona Freeway
- Interstate 5, Santa Ana Freeway
- Interstate 105, Century Freeway
- State Route 91, Artesia Freeway
- Interstate 405, San Diego Freeway

== Transportation ==
Montebello Transit line 30, Metro Local line 258, and Long Beach Transit line 21, 22 & 23 run along the avenue.

== Landmarks ==
- Garfield Theater (Alhambra, California)
- The Hat sign (Valley Boulevard and Garfield Ave.)

== See also ==
- List of streets in the San Gabriel Valley
