= Cornelis Van Dam =

Canadian Old Testament scholar

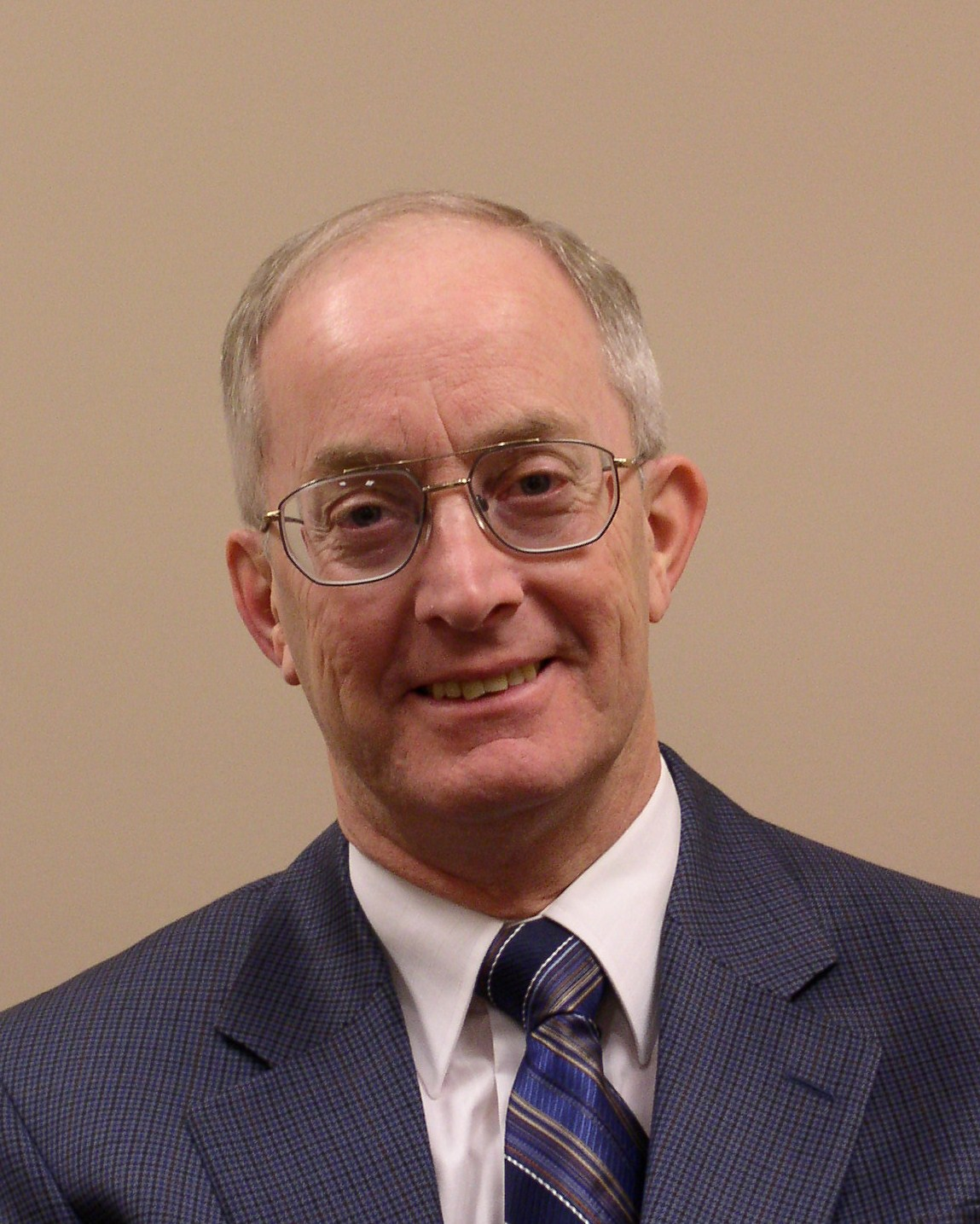
- Born: 7 April 1946 (age 80)
- Occupation: Canadian Old Testament scholar

Academic background
- Education: Theological University of Kampen
- Thesis: The urim and thummim: a study of an Old Testament means of revelation (1986)

Academic work
- Discipline: Biblical Studies
- Sub-discipline: Old Testament Studies Biblical Hebrew
- Institutions: Canadian Reformed Theological Seminary (1981-2011)

Cornelis Van Dam (born 7 April 1946) is a Canadian Old Testament scholar. He was professor of Old Testament at the Canadian Reformed Theological Seminary, from 1981 to 2011.

Van Dam holds degrees from Wilfrid Laurier University (BA), Canadian Reformed Theological Seminary (BD), Knox College at the University of Toronto (ThM), and the Theological University of Kampen (ThD).

== Biography ==
Van Dam graduated from Wilfrid Laurier University, with a BA in 1968. After a memorable year at Westminster Theological Seminary, he transferred to the newly founded Canadian Reformed Theological Seminary from which he graduated with a BD degree in 1971.

He served in the pastoral ministry of the Canadian Reformed Churches from 1971 to 1981 in Neerlandia, Alberta, Brampton, Ontario, and Surrey, British Columbia. In the meantime he continued his studies and graduated from Knox College at the University of Toronto with a MTh degree in 1980. In 1986 he earned his doctoral degree, ThD, from the Theological University of Kampen/Utrecht.

His time in the parsonage sparked his interest in the Old Testament roots of the offices of elder and deacon eventually resulting in the publication of The Elder and The Deacon. His interests in what the Bible says about government and politics got him involved in, among other endeavors, as a national board member of The Association for Reformed Political Action and as a speaker on Parliament Hill in Ottawa on a biblical perspective on God and Government (2009).

As an academic, he also pursued his interests in topics related to the priesthood and Genesis 1 and 2, the sacrifices and feasts of ancient Israel and their ongoing relevance for Christians, and with other research still ongoing.

In 2011, a Festschrift was published in his honor. Living Waters from Ancient Springs: Essays in Honor of Cornelis Van Dam. It includes contributions from Hans Boersma, Willem VanGemeren and Al Wolters.

== Selected publications ==
=== Authored books and monographs ===
- “Tell the Next Generation”: Essays on Christian Education at Home and in School. Barrhead, AB; Hamilton, ON: Providence Books & Press; Lucerna, 2024.
- In Holy Service: Essays on Office—Personal and Ecclesial. Hamilton, ON; Carman, MB: Lucerna; Reformed Perspective Press, 2023.
- In the Beginning: Listening to Genesis 1 and 2. Grand Rapids, MI: Reformation Heritage Books, 2021.
- Worship Matters: Essays on Public Worship. With a contribution by Arjan de Visser. Lucerna; Reformed Perspective Press: Hamilton, ON; Carman, MB, 2021.
- Hope and Comfort in the Book of Job. Winnipeg: Premier Publishing, 2017.
- The Deacon: Biblical Foundations for Today's Ministry of Mercy. Grand Rapids: Reformation Heritage Books, 2016.
- God and Government: Biblical Principles for Today: An Introduction and Resource. Eugene, OR: Wipf & Stock, 2011.
- The Elder: Today’s Ministry Rooted in All of Scripture. Explorations in Biblical Theology. Phillipsburg, NJ: P&R, 2009.
- The Urim and Thummim. A Means of Revelation in Ancient Israel. Winona Lake, IN: Eisenbrauns, 1997
- Divorce and Remarriage in the Light of Old Testament Principles and Their Application in the New Testament. Winnipeg: Premier, 1996.

=== Articles and Essays ===
- “Urim and Thummim” on SBL’s Bible Odyssey website (2022).
- “Children, Passover, and the Lord’s Supper.” In Children and the Church: “Do not Hinder Them, edited by William den Hollander and Gerhard H. Visscher, 73-102. Hamilton, ON: Lucerna, 2019.
- “Working Politically and Socially in Anticipation of Christ’s Coming.” In As You See the Day Approaching, edited by Theodore G. Van Raalte, 54-69. Lucerna; Pickwick Publications: Hamilton, ON; Eugene, OR, 2016.
- “Inter-religious Relations and the Challenge of Multiculturalism: Some Biblical Principles” in Hallvard Hagelia and Markus Zehnder, eds., Interreligious Relations: Biblical Perspectives, 31-50. London, UK: Bloomsbury T&T Clark, 2017.
- “Interpreting Historical Narrative: Truth Claim, Truth Value, and Historicity.” In Correctly Handling the Word of Truth, edited by Mees te Velde and Gerhard H. Visscher, 83-115. Lucerna; Wipf & Stock: Hamilton, ON; Eugene, OR, 2014.
- "Divination, Magic.” In Dictionary of the Old Testament: Prophets, edited by Mark J. Boda and J. Gordon McConville, 159-62. Downers Grove, Illinois: IVP Academic, 2012.
- “Golden Calf.” In Dictionary of the Old Testament: Pentateuch, edited by T. Desmond Alexander and David W. Baker, 368-71. Downers Grove, Illinois: InterVarsity Press, 2003.
- “Priestly Clothing.” In Dictionary of the Old Testament: Pentateuch, edited by T. Desmond Alexander and David W. Baker, 643-46. Downers Grove, Illinois: InterVarsity Press, 2003.
- “Rod, Staff.” In Dictionary of the Old Testament: Pentateuch, edited by T. Desmond Alexander and David W. Baker, 693-94. Downers Grove, Illinois: IVP Academic, 2003.
- 70 articles in The New International Dictionary of Old Testament Theology and Exegesis, edited by W. Van Gemeren. 5 vols. Grand Rapids: Zondervan, 1997. For a complete list see Living Waters From Ancient Springs, edited by Jason van Vliet, 237-39. Eugene, OR: Pickwick Publications, 2011.
- “Elder.” In Evangelical Dictionary of Biblical Theology, edited by W. Ellwell, 197-99. Grand Rapids: Baker, 1996.
- "Urim and Thummim.” In Evangelical Dictionary of Biblical Theology, edited by W. Ellwell, 794. Grand Rapids: Baker, 1996.
- “Duidelijke Taal. De boodschap van de hemelen volgens Psalm 19:5a.” In Een Sprekend Begin. Opstellen aangeboden aan Prof. Drs. H. M. Ohmann, edited by R. ter Beek, E. Brink, C. Van Dam, and G. Kwakkel, 86-93. Kampen: Uitgeverij Van den Berg, 1993.
- When Brothers Dwell in Unity [Ps 133].” In The Challenge of Church Union. Speeches and Discussions on Reformed Identity and Ecumenicity, edited by C. Van Dam, 201-212. Publication 1 of the Burlington Reformed Study Centre. Winnipeg: Premier, 1993.
- “The Burnt Offering in Its Biblical Context.” Mid-America Journal of Theology 7 (1991): 195-206.
- “The Incense Offering in its Biblical Context.” Mid-America Journal of Theology 7 (1991): 179-184.
- “The Origin and Character of Sacrifice in Scripture.” Mid-America Journal of Theology 7 (1991): 3-16.
- “How Shall We Read Genesis 1?” Mid-America Journal of Theology 6 (1990): 19-32.
- The Meaning of bišegagâ.” In Unity in Diversity: Studies Presented to Prof. Dr. Jelle Faber on the occasion of his Retirement, edited by R. Faber, 13-24. Hamilton: The Senate of the Theological College of the Canadian Reformed Churches, 1989.
- “The Elder as Preserver and Nurturer of Life in the Covenant.” In Proceedings of the International Conference of Reformed Churches June 19–28, 1989, 277-298 Winnipeg: Premier, 1989. Reprinted in Lux Mundi 8.3 (1989): 9-12; 8.4 (1989): 4-9.

=== Curriculum Vitae ===
For a complete curriculum vitae, see here and the Academia.edu site.
