= Can You Imagine That Confections =

American candy manufacturer

Can You Imagine That Confections is a candy manufacturer based in Covina, California. It is involved in the production of a number of products including Sandy Candy, an internationally distributed dextrose based powder. It is owned by serial candy designer David Klein. His daughter, Roxanne Klein, is in charge of new product creation and development. The company has been featured heavily in television shows such as Candyman: the David Klein Story.
