= List of people from Alhambra, California =

This article lists people from Alhambra, California.

- Carl Ciarfalio, (1953-2025), Actor and stuntman.
- Sasha Renée Pérez, California State Senator and Former Alhambra Mayor
- Hank Aguirre, baseball player
- Duane Allen, football player
- Atlas, graffiti artist
- Jairo Avila Jr., NASCAR driver
- Andrew E. Bellisario, Roman Catholic bishop
- Ron Cey, baseball player
- Jack Chick Christian evangelist and cartoonist
- Roberta Collins, actress
- Dean Cundey, cinematographer and film director
- Clive Cussler, novelist
- Alexander Fost, dancer, So You Think You Can Dance contestant
- Amy Kim Ganter, author
- Bob Givens, animator
- Sam Hanks, race car driver, won 1957 Indianapolis 500
- Rico Harris, former Harlem Globetrotter missing since 2014
- James Jannard, fashion designer
- Frank Tenney Johnson, western artist
- Kazu Kibuishi, graphic novel illustrator
- Ralph Kiner, Hall of Fame Major League Baseball player, broadcaster
- Kenny Loggins, musician
- Danny Lopez, world champion boxer
- Lance Mountain, professional skateboarder
- Jacqueline Nguyen, United States Circuit Judge of the United States Court of Appeals for the Ninth Circuit
- Frank Pastore, baseball player
- Albie Pearson, baseball player
- Ke Huy Quan, actor, stunt coordinator
- Noé Ramirez, baseball player
- Jim Rathmann, race car driver, won 1960 Indianapolis 500
- Norman Rockwell, artist, lived in Alhambra in the early 1930s
- Dorothy Howell Rodham (1919 – 2011), homemaker, mother of U.S. Secretary of State Hillary Clinton
- Tex Schramm, president of NFL's Dallas Cowboys
- Dean Scofield, actor
- Peter Seidler, Founder and managing partner of Seidler Equity Partners. Chairman and owner of the San Diego Padres
- Phil Spector, music producer
- Mickey Thompson (1928-1988), race car driver. Born in Alhambra
- Cheryl Tiegs, model
- Melissa Villaseñor, comedian and impressionist, Saturday Night Live
- Mitch Vogel, actor
- Ron Warner, Third Base Coach for the St. Louis Cardinals baseball team.
- James D. Watkins, admiral
- Betty White, actress
- Verne Winchell, businessman
- Xasthur, black metal band
- Rolly Crump, Animator and designer
