= David Klein (businessman) =

Developer of the Jelly Belly

- Born: Syracuse, New York
- Education: University of California, Los Angeles, Southwestern Law School
- Occupation: Confectioner
- Known for: Developer of the Jelly Belly
- Spouse: Rebecca (m 1970 died 2020)
- Children: Roxanne and Bert

David Klein (born 1946) is the developer of the Jelly Belly brand of jelly beans.

== Early life ==
Klein was born in Syracuse, New York in 1946. He moved to California at the age of three. Klein eventually attended the University of California, Los Angeles where he studied economics. Klein then went on to obtain a law degree from Southwestern Law School, but after taking the bar exam decided not to pursue a career as a lawyer.

== Career ==
In 1976, Klein lived in Temple City, California and started the distribution company, Garvey Nut & Candy. He came up with the idea for a new type of jelly bean, later called "Jelly Belly", and asked the Herman Goelitz Candy Company to make a batch for him.

Klein then rented a corner of Fosselman's Ice Cream in Alhambra, California to sell the new type of jelly beans. The first flavors were Very Cherry, Tangerine, Lemon, Green Apple, Grape Jelly, Licorice, Root Beer, and Cream Soda. Total sales for the first seven-day period was $44. The product was selling for $2 per pound, which was considered a very high price at the time. Klein convinced the Associated Press to write a story, arranging for friends and family to act as customers. The article caused sales to spike.

In 1980, Klein and his partner sold their rights in Jelly Belly to the Herman Goelitz Candy Company, for $5 million, to be paid out over 20 years. Klein and his partner each received about $10,000 per month for 20 years, in exchange for their share of the Jelly Belly brand, including the trademark of that name.

David's Signature Beyond Gourmet Jelly Beans are named after David Klein.

In 2017 David Klein moved operations of Can You Imagine That and his new branded company Candyman Kitchens to Florida. They produce Sandy Candy as well as other new confections out of their factory in Largo, Florida.

== Projects ==
In 2016 he launched a crowdfunding support page for 'THE ORIGINAL COFFEE HOUSE BEANS.' The combination of flavors delivers a taste mimicking gourmet coffee flavors. On its Kickstarter page, it is described as "a conventional jelly bean center texture surrounded by the most imaginative flavors on the outside of the bean."

In 2019, he created a campaign for Polar Popcorn - described as "A Freeze and Eat Treat" made up of puffy popcorn kernels coated in caramel and ice cream/birthday cake flavor; topped with sprinkles".

== Personal life ==
Klein's wife, Rebecca, who died in 2020, worked with him in their confectionery development business, Can You Imagine That Confections Inc.; his daughter, Roxanne, who studied business at the University of La Verne, also contributes to the business, such as coming up with the concept of 'Sandy Candy', which by October 2011 had made $1 million. The company operates from a factory in California.
