= Van Damm =

van Damm or Van Damm is a surname of Dutch origin. Notable people with the name include:

- Vivian Van Damm (1895–1960), British London theatre impresario
- Sheila van Damm (1922–1987), British motor rally competitor and theatre owner; daughter of Vivian van Damm
- Florence Vandamm (1883–1966), British photographer

== See also ==
- van Damme (disambiguation)
- van Dam
- Dam, Danish surname
