= Dams (surname) =

Dams is a surname. Notable people with the surname include:

- Jimi Dams (born 1963), American artist
- Marguerita Dams (born 1947), Belgian cyclist
- Niklas Dams (born 1990), German footballer
- Pierre-Ernest Dams (1794–1855), Luxembourgian politician, judge and journalist

== See also ==
- Lloyd van Dams (born 1972), Surinamese-Dutch kickboxer
- Dam, Danish surname
