= Fosselman's Ice Cream Company =

American ice cream company

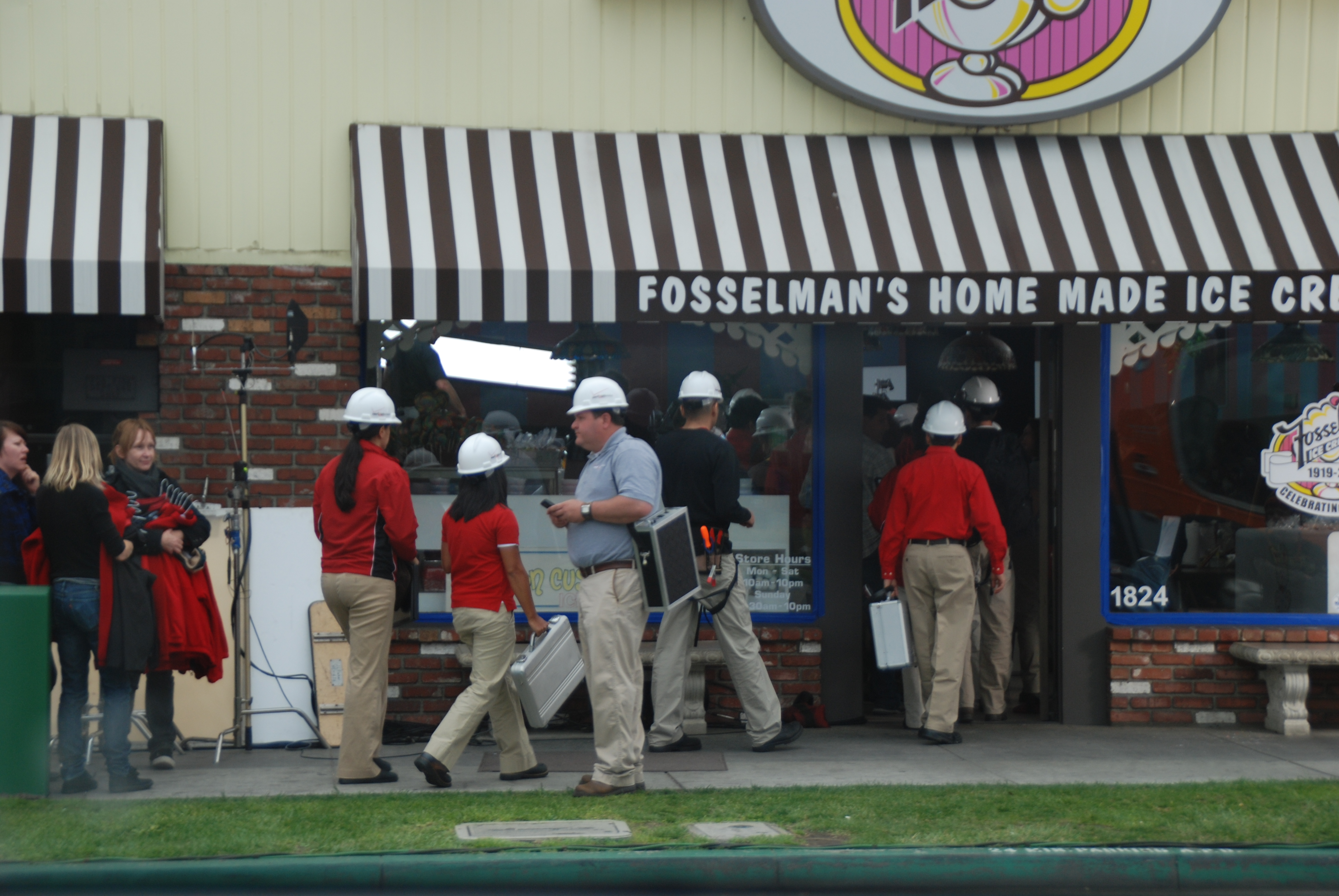
- Fosselman's Ice Cream Company store, being used for a commercial shoot
- Trade name: Fosselman's Ice Cream Company (Alhambra); The Ice Cream Shop (Glendora)
- Type: Private
- Industry: Ice cream shop and manufacturer
- Predecessors: Fosselman's, Inc. (1919–1921); Fosselman Creamery (1924–1937)
- Founded: 1937; 89 years ago in South Pasadena, California as Fosselman's Ice Cream Company
- Founder: Christian Anthony Fosselman
- Headquarters: Alhambra, California, US
- Number of locations: 2
- Area served: Southern California
- Products: Ice cream
- Website: fosselmans.com

Fosselman's Ice Cream Company is a historic ice cream company based in Alhambra, California, located at 1824 W. Main Street, that has been owned and operated by the same family for three generations. Although the present company was started in 1937, the company can trace it roots to a related family business founded in 1919.

== History ==
In 1919, Christian Anthony Fosselman created Fosselman's, Inc., to manufacture ice cream in Waverly, Iowa. Five years later, Fosselman relocated with his family to Southern California to found a wholesale dairy business in Pasadena, called Fosselman Creamery that also delivered milk, butter, cream, and ice cream directly to families in the San Gabriel Valley through a fleet of company-owned trucks.

In 1937, Fosselman sold the creamery and started an ice cream shop in South Pasadena called Fosselman's Ice Cream Company that made ice cream on the premises. Additional storefronts were opened in Highland Park (1941), and Glendale, with a production facility in Alhambra. All but the Alhambra location, also an ice cream parlor, closed in the 1970s. Also in the 1970s, Jelly Belly creator David Klein rented a part of Fosselman's to promote and sell his jelly beans, then in their nascence.

Since the 1980s, Fosselman brothers John and Chris, grandsons of founder Christian, have run the company. The company also supplies product to approximately 500 outlets, from "high-end restaurants to food trucks to retirement homes."

In 2015, the company introduced soft serve ice cream, soft serve custard, and milkshakes as part of its repertoire. To cater to the dominant Asian population in Alhambra, flavors such as taro, lychee, and ube were added. In 2019, Fosselman's opened a new branch, called The Ice Cream Shop, in Glendora.

== Products ==
In addition to producing and carrying such classic ice cream flavors as chocolate, vanilla, and strawberry, Fosselman's also features exotic flavors such as taro, ube, and lychee, a nod to the majority Asian population in Alhambra. Some seasonal flavors include fresh peach, sweet corn elote, and watermelon sorbet. Previous flavors include black sesame, dulche de leche, horchata, matcha green tea, oaxacan chocolate and red bean.

== Reviews ==
The Los Angeles Times called Fosselman's "the Alhambra emperors of ice cream". The British newspaper The Guardian called Fosselman's the "Best place to drink: Milkshakes".
