= Hans Boersma =

Dutch and Canadian theologian (born 1961)

The Reverend Hans Boersma
- Born: 1961 (age 64–65); Netherlands

Ecclesiastical career
- Religion: Christianity (Anglican)
- Church: Anglican Church in North America
- Ordained: 2021 (deacon); 2021 (priest)

Academic background
- Education: University of Lethbridge; Theological College of the Canadian Reformed Churches; Utrecht University
- Thesis: A Hot Pepper Corn (1993)

Academic work
- Discipline: Theology
- Sub-discipline: Ascetical theology; patristics; sacramental theology
- School or tradition: Reformed Christianity
- Institutions: Trinity Western University; Regent College; Nashotah House
- Website: hansboersma.org

Hans Boersma (born 1961) is a Dutch and Canadian theologian specialising in patristics, sacramental theology, and nouvelle théologie. On Nov. 19th, 2026, Boersma announced on his substack he had become an Orthodox catechumen.

== Life and career ==
Boersma is of Reformed background, and is a priest of the Anglican Church in North America. He holds degrees from the University of Lethbridge, the Theological College of the Canadian Reformed Churches, and Utrecht University.

He previously taught at Trinity Western University in Langley, B.C. (1999–2005), and served as the J. I. Packer Professor of Theology at Regent College from 2005 to 2019. Boersma held the Danforth Visiting Chair at St. Louis University from 2015 to 2016. He currently holds the chair to the Order of St. Benedict Servants of Christ Endowed Professorship in Ascetical Theology at Nashotah House, a theological seminary in the Anglo-Catholic tradition.

From 2003 until 2004, Boersma was the president of the Canadian-American Theological Association, a forum for scholarly contributions to the renewal of theology and biblical interpretation.

== Works ==
- Seeing God: The Beatific Vision in Christian Tradition (Eerdmans, 2018) ISBN 9780802880192
- Scripture as Real Presence: Sacramental Exegesis in the Early Church (Baker Academic, 2017) ISBN 9781540961020
- Sacramental Preaching: Sermons on the Hidden Presence of Christ (Baker, 2016) ISBN 9780801097454
- The Oxford Handbook of Sacramental Theology, ed. Hans Boersma and Matthew Levering (Oxford University Press, 2015) ISBN 9780198816614
- Eucharistic Participation: The Reconfiguration of Time and Space (Regent College Publishing, 2013)
- Embodiment and Virtue in Gregory of Nyssa: An Anagogical Approach (Oxford University Press, 2013) ISBN 9780198728238
- Heaven on Earth? Theological Interpretation in Ecumenical Dialogue, ed. Hans Boersma and Matthew Levering (Wiley-Blackwell, 2013) ISBN 9781118551929
- Heavenly Participation: The Weaving of a Sacramental Tapestry (Eerdmans, 2011) ISBN 9780802865427
- Nouvelle Théologie & Sacramental Ontology: A Return to Mystery (Oxford University Press, 2010) ISBN 9780199664245
- Violence, Hospitality, and the Cross: Reappropriating the Atonement Tradition (Baker, 2006) ISBN 9780801031335 — Christianity Today 2005 Book Award Winner
