= Marich Confectionery =

U.S.-based confectioner

- Founded: Watsonville, California (1983)
- Founder: Marinus van Dam
- Headquarters: Hollister, California
- Key people: Brad van Dam (President & CEO)
- Products: Sugar Panning, Chocolate, Truffles, Candies, Jelly Beans, Cookies
- Website: www.marich.com

Marich Confectionery (pronounced "Mahr-ich") is a U.S.-based confectioner that was established in 1983 by Marinus van Dam, creator of the Jelly Belly brand of jelly beans. The company's operations are located in Hollister, California.

== History ==
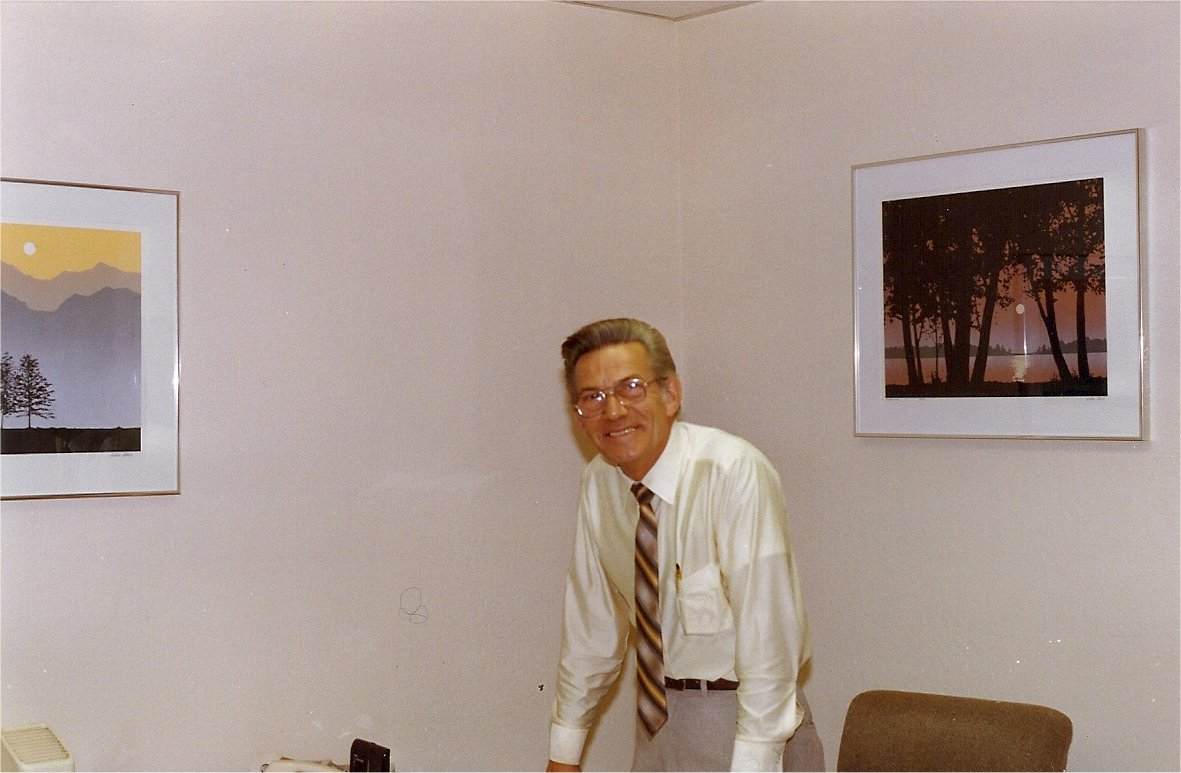
Marinus van Dam (1984)

In 1944, in Rotterdam, Netherlands, fifteen-year-old Marinus van Dam began work as a janitor at a local confectionery factory, scraping the candy remnants off the floor. Eventually, he was rewarded with an opportunity to attend confectionery school to study the art of candy technology.

In January 1957, according to the company website, Marinus emigrated from the Netherlands to the United States and found work at a small company in Columbus, Ohio. After three months, Marinus decided to move to California, where he worked for Herman Goelitz Candy Company.

In 1983, according to the company website, Marinus launched his own candy business, Marich Confectionery, with the help of several partners. The company developed and commercialized chocolate-covered dried fruits. The first was the chocolate covered dried cherry with pastel cherry coating, in the 1980s, followed by the chocolate covered dried blueberry in 1992.

Today, Marich operates a 90,000 square-foot facility in Hollister, California, with 125 employees in operations, administration, sales, marketing, and finance in offices adjacent to the confectionery production floor.

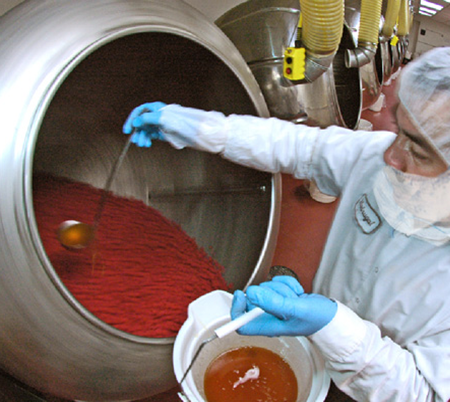
Chocolates being produced in the pan.

== Awards and publicity ==
In 1995, Marich was recognized for its leadership in shaping the gourmet chocolate market. In 2001, Marich received the International Fancy Food Show award for the creation of the chocolate covered dried cherry. The company also received awards in 2001 and 2004 from the Specialty Food Association.

The company is Fair Trade certified according to a notice on its website.
