= Damme (disambiguation) =

Damme is a municipality in the Belgian province of West Flanders. It can also refer to:

- Damme (Dümmer), town in Lower Saxony, Germany
- Damme Canal, in West Flanders, Belgium
- Damme Hills, in Lower Saxony, Germany
- Store Damme, a village in Vordingborg, Denmark
- Jörg Damme (born 1959), German sport shooter

== See also ==
- Dame (disambiguation)
- Van Damme (disambiguation)
