= Pop-up maps =

Pop-Up Maps
- Author: Stephan Van Dam
- Original title: The World Unfolds
- Illustrator: Stephan Van Dam
- Language: English
- Subject: 3-Dimensional maps
- Publisher: VanDam, Inc.
- Publication date: 1984
- Publication place: United States
- Media type: Print, Dimensional Print

The Pop-Up or Unfolds, or in full The World Unfolds, is a name given to any one of a range of patented, self-folding subject guides and street maps for cities around the world published by VanDam, Inc.. The first Unfolds pop-up map was designed and published in 1984 by Stephan Van Dam as part of a series of 18 international maps which American Express offered to card members.

The Unfolds Pop-Up format was licensed in custom formats by clients such as Walt Disney Company, Warner Brothers, Museum of Modern Art, Rand McNally, National Park Service, Bertelsmann, TED (conference), BMW, Pfizer, Marvel Entertainment, MTV Books and Berlitz Corporation among others. A series of educational guides called The Cosmos Unfolds with guides to the universe, Mars, Moon, Ocean, Desert and Rain Forest were published by Putnam-Berkley in the US and Canada.

In 2010 The Museum of Modern Art accessioned 27 of Van Dam's pop-up maps into its permanent collection.

VanDam, Inc. continues to publish the Pop-Up and Unfolds street maps to many cities around the world. VanDam, Inc. also publishes in other formats including StreetSmart, StreetSmartMini, HistoryMapped, ArtSmart, ShopSmart, 2.5 and Urban@tlas.
