= Platt College (San Diego) =

Coordinates: 32°45′49.42″N 117°03′49.42″W

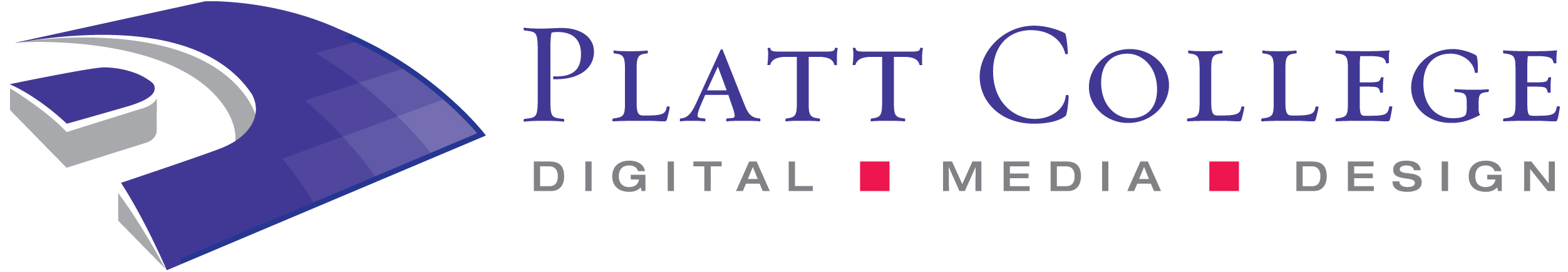
- Type: Private for-profit college
- Active: 1879–June 6, 2023
- Chairman: Robert Leiker
- President: Meg Leiker
- Academic staff: 35
- Undergraduates: 400
- Location: San Diego, California, United States
- Campus: Urban, 16,700 sq ft (1,550 m^{2})
- Website: platt.edu/

Platt College San Diego (PCSD) was a private for-profit college in San Diego, California. The college's academic programs focused on digital design. It was accredited by the Accrediting Commission of Career Schools and Colleges (ACCSC). The college ceased offering classes in 2023, citing "rising costs since the pandemic, low enrollments, and not being able to renew the lease".
