= HistoryMapped =

Series of presidential maps

- George Washington Presidential Map: Northeast Edition
- Author: Stephan VanDam
- Subject: History
- Publisher: VanDam
- Publication date: 2013
- Publication place: United States
- Media type: Print

HistoryMapped is a series of Presidential maps published by VanDam, Inc, the New York CIty map publisher in cooperation with the National Park Service.

These maps chart the lives of American Presidents and put their personal geographies into the context of their age. The series includes maps of George Washington, Abraham Lincoln and Thomas Jefferson.

Each map features a historical map graphic on one side and a city map tracing the President's footsteps on the reverse. City maps of historic Boston, Chicago, Springfield, IL, New York, Philadelphia and Washington D.C. pinpoint locations each President acted in during their lifetime.

== Author ==
The series was conceived, art-directed and published by Stephan Van Dam. Design and production by Eamonn Fitzmaurice and editorial direction by Gail Pellett. All historical information was provided by the National Park Service.

== Distribution ==
HistoryMapped charts new ground in pairing cultural tourism with teaching American history and geo-literacy. VanDam's Presidential maps are offered at key destination stores, museums and memorials, including the National Gallery of Art, The National Museum of American History, The Lincoln Memorial, Ford's Theatre, The Library of Congress, The National Archives, The Smithsonian, The Lincoln Presidential Library and other major institutions who serve the public with an educational mission.

== Format ==
Each laminated Presidential map is accordion folded and fits easily into a pocket. Closed dimension is: 4" x 9"; 32" x 9" when open.

History Mapped is currently available in five different localized versions:

- Abraham Lincoln Presidential Map: Capital Edition
- Abraham Lincoln Presidential Map: Illinois Edition
- George Washington Presidential Map: Capital Edition
- George Washington Presidential Map: Northeast Edition
- Thomas Jefferson Presidential Map: Capital Edition
