= Stephan Van Dam =

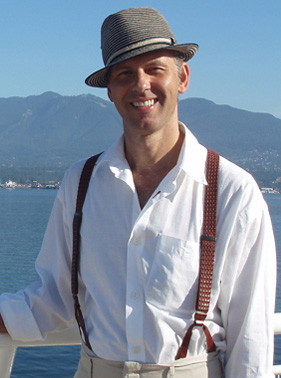
- Van Dam in August 2010
- Born: April 2, 1959 (age 67); Germany
- Education: Parsons School of Design, 1981; Harvard Business Club, 1985; School of Visual Arts, 1996
- Occupations: Cartographer; Graphic Designer; Information Architect; Publisher
- Awards: Gold, Industrial Design Society of America, 1986; ID Magazine, Honorable Mention, 1989; AIGA, 1997
- Website: www.vandam.com

Stephan Van Dam (born April 2, 1959) is a cartographer, graphic designer and information architect. He is the president, principal and creative director of New York–based VanDam, Inc. Van Dam holds several patents in the field of paper engineering and origami map folding. Twenty-six of his maps are in the permanent Design Collection of the Museum of Modern Art (MoMA).

Van Dam presented Understanding Maps at the original TED (conference) in 2002.

He has received awards for his work from the Industrial Designers Society of America (IDSA), the American Institute of Graphic Arts (AIGA), the editors of ID Magazine.

== See also ==
- Pop-up maps, a product published by his company
