= Alhambra, California =

City in California, United States

- City
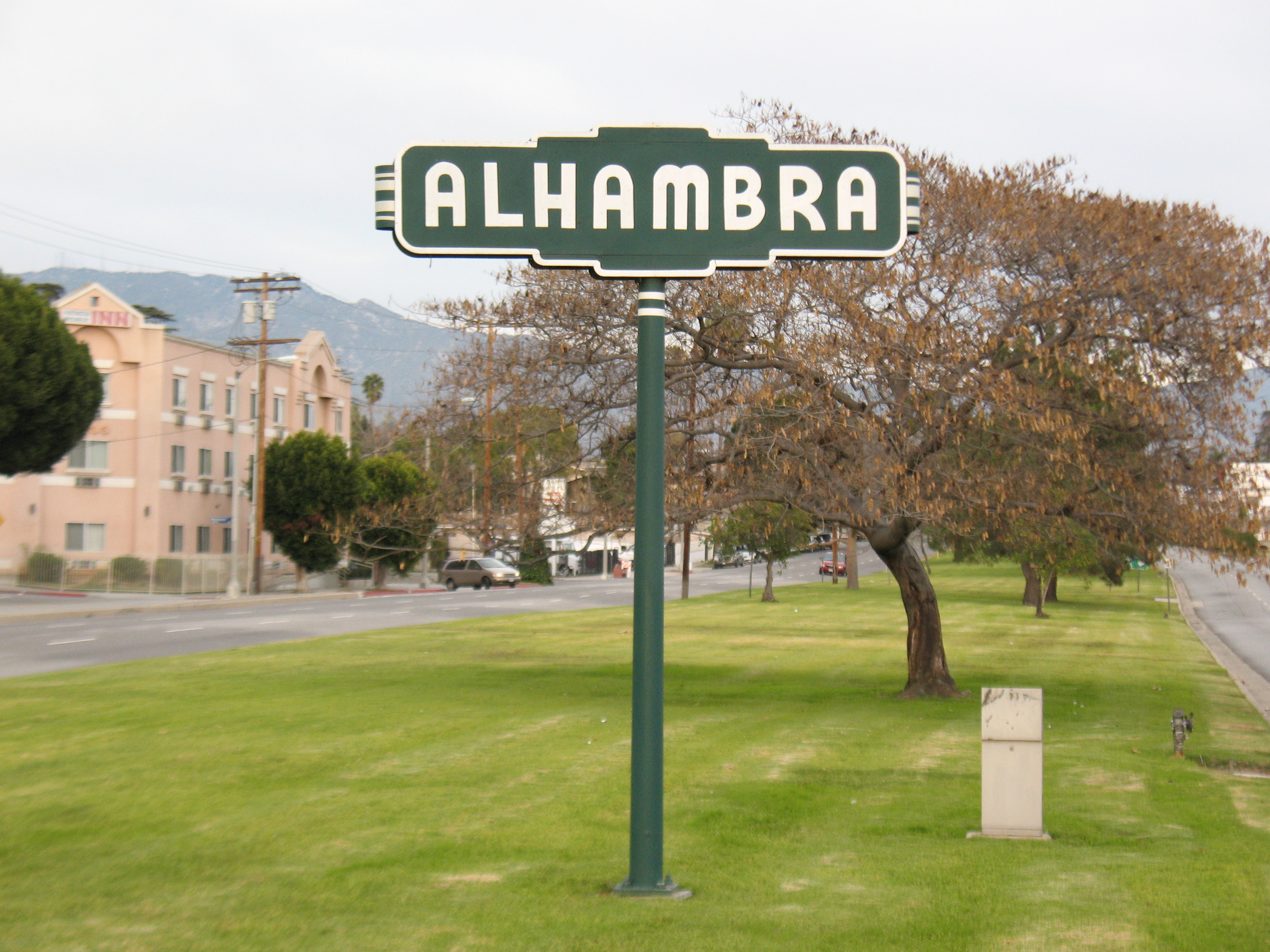
- Alhambra welcome sign

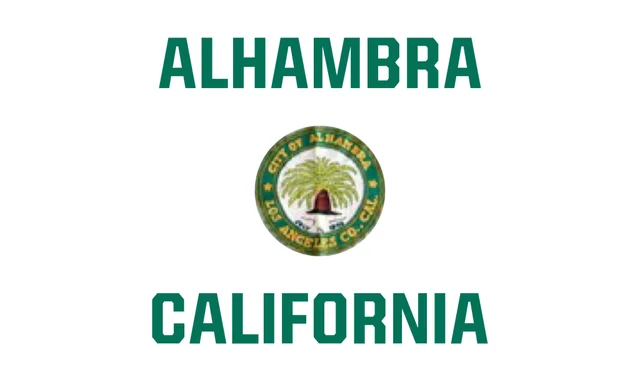
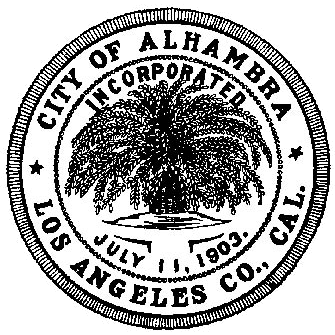
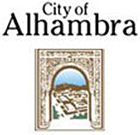
- Flag Seal Logo
- Motto: "Gateway to San Gabriel Valley"
- Interactive map of Alhambra, California
- Location in California Alhambra (the United States) Alhambra (North America)
- Coordinates: 34°4′55″N 118°8′6″W
- Country: United States
- State: California
- County: Los Angeles
- Incorporated: July 11, 1903
- Named for: Tales of the Alhambra

Government
  - Type: City council
  - Mayor: Jeffrey Koji Maloney(D)
  - Vice Mayor: Adele Andrade-Stadler (I)
  - Councilor: (District 1) Katherine Lee (I) (District 2) Ross J. Maza (D) (District 3) Jeffrey Koji Maloney (D) (District 4) Noya Wang (D) (District 5) Adele Andrade-Stadler (I)
  - City Manager: Jessica Binnquist

Area
  - Total: 7.63 sq mi (19.77 km^{2})
  - Land: 7.63 sq mi (19.76 km^{2})
  - Water: 0 sq mi (0.00 km^{2}) 0.01%
- Elevation: 490 ft (150 m)

Population (2020)
  - Total: 82,868
  - Density: 10,859.3/sq mi (4,192.78/km^{2})
- Time zone: UTC−8 (Pacific)
  - Summer (DST): UTC−7 (PDT)
- ZIP Codes: 91801−91803
- Area codes: 626, 323
- FIPS code: 06-00884
- GNIS feature IDs: 1660243, 2409681
- Website: alhambraca.gov

Alhambra (/ælˈhæmbrə/, /ɑːlˈhɑːmbrə/, Spanish pronunciation: [aˈlambɾa]; from "Alhambra") is a city located in the western San Gabriel Valley region of Los Angeles County, California, United States, approximately 8 miles (13 km) east from the downtown Los Angeles civic center. It was incorporated on July 11, 1903. As of the 2020 census, the population was 82,868. The city's ZIP Codes are 91801 and 91803 (plus 91802 for P.O. boxes).

== History ==
The San Gabriel Mission was founded nearby on September 8, 1771, as part of the Spanish conquest and occupation of Alta California. The land that would later become Alhambra was part of a 300,000-acre (120,000 ha) land grant given to Armane Gutter, a soldier from the Los Angeles Presidio. In 1820 Mexico won its independence from the Spanish crown and lands once ruled by them became part of the Mexican Republic. These lands then transferred into the hands of the United States following the defeat in the Mexican–American War. A wealthy developer, Benjamin Davis Wilson, purchased the land that would become Alhambra from his ward Victoria Reid. With the persuasion of his daughter, Ruth, his development was named the land after a book she was reading, Washington Irving's Tales of the Alhambra, which he was inspired to write by his extended visit to the Alhambra palace in Granada, Spain. Alhambra was founded as a suburb of Los Angeles that remained an unincorporated area during the mid-19th century. The first school in Alhambra was Ramona Convent Secondary School, built on hillside property donated by the prominent James de Barth Shorb family. Thirteen years before the city was incorporated, several prominent San Gabriel Valley families interested in the Catholic education of their daughters established the school in 1890. The city's first public high school, Alhambra High School, was established in 1898, five years before the city's incorporation. On July 11, 1903, the City of Alhambra was incorporated. The Alhambra Fire Department was established in 1906.

Alhambra is promoted as a "city of homes", and many of its homes have historical significance. They include styles such as craftsman, bungalow, Spanish Mediterranean, Spanish colonial revival, Italian beaux-arts, and arts and crafts. Twenty-six single-family residential areas have been designated historic neighborhoods by the city, including the Bean Tract (formerly owned by early resident Jacob Bean), the Midwick Tract (site of the former Midwick Country Club), the Airport Tract (formerly the landing pad for Alhambra Airport), and the Emery Park area. There are also a large number of condominiums, rental apartments, and mixed-use residential/commercial buildings, especially in the downtown area.

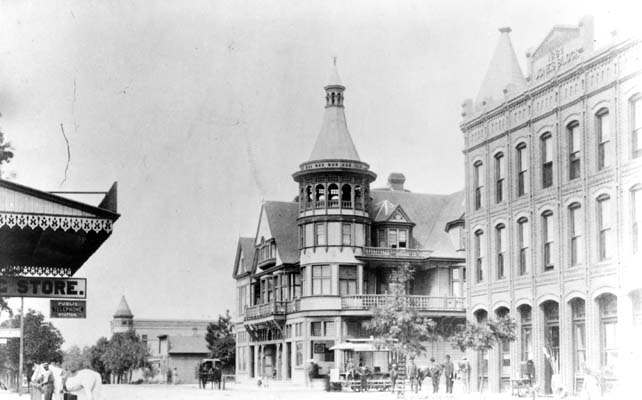
Downtown Alhambra, Garfield and Main, 1890

Alhambra's main business district, at the intersection of Main and Garfield, has been a center of commerce since 1895. By the 1950s, it had taken on an upscale look and was "the" place to go in the San Gabriel Valley. While many of the classic historical buildings have been torn down over the years, the rebuilding of Main Street has led to numerous dining, retail, and entertainment establishments. Alhambra has experienced waves of new immigrants, beginning with Italians in the 1950s, Mexicans in the 1960s, and Chinese in the 1980s. As a result, a very active Chinese business district has developed on Valley Boulevard, including Chinese supermarkets, restaurants, shops, banks, realtors, and medical offices. The Valley Boulevard corridor has become a national hub for many Asian-owned bank headquarters, and there are other nationally recognised retailers in the city.

The historic Garfield Theatre, located at Valley Boulevard and Garfield Avenue from 1925 until 2001, was formerly a vaudeville venue and is rumored to have hosted the Gumm Sisters, featuring a very young Judy Garland. Faded from its original glory, for its last few years it was purchased and ran Chinese-language films, and in 2001 went out of business. Subsequently, developers have remodeled the dilapidated building, turning it into a vibrant commercial center with many Chinese stores and eateries.

In 2003, actress Lana Clarkson was shot to death in the Alhambra home of record producer Phil Spector. Spector lived in Alhambra's largest and most notable residence, the Pyrenees Castle, built in 1926. In 2009, Spector was convicted of second-degree murder in connection with Clarkson's death.

== Geography ==
Alhambra is bordered by South Pasadena on the northwest, San Marino on the north, San Gabriel on the east, Monterey Park on the south, and the Los Angeles city neighborhoods of Monterey Hills and El Sereno on the west.

The city has a total area of 7.6 square miles (20 km^{2}), over 99% of which is land.

== Demographics ==
Historical population
Census	Pop.	Note	%±
1890	808		—
1910	5,021		—
1920	9,096		81.2%
1930	29,472		224.0%
1940	38,935		32.1%
1950	51,359		31.9%
1960	54,807		6.7%
1970	62,125		13.4%
1980	64,767		4.3%
1990	82,106		26.8%
2000	85,804		4.5%
2010	83,089		−3.2%
2020	82,868		−0.3%
U.S. Decennial Census

=== Racial and ethnic composition ===
Alhambra, California – Racial and ethnic composition Note: the US Census treats Hispanic/Latino as an ethnic category. This table excludes Latinos from the racial categories and assigns them to a separate category. Hispanics/Latinos may be of any race.
Race / Ethnicity (NH = Non-Hispanic)	Pop 1980	Pop 1990	Pop 2000	Pop 2010	Pop 2020	% 1980	% 1990	% 2000	% 2010	% 2020
White alone (NH)	31,441	19,924	11,881	8,346	6,942	48.66%	24.27%	13.85%	10.04%	8.38%
Black or African American alone (NH)	603	1,482	1,255	1,078	1,345	0.93%	1.80%	1.46%	1.30%	1.62%
Native American or Alaska Native alone (NH)	121	190	181	116	137	0.19%	0.23%	0.21%	0.14%	0.17%
Asian alone (NH)	7,956	30,715	40,269	43,614	42,552	12.31%	37.41%	46.93%	52.49%	51.35%
Pacific Islander alone (NH)	7,956	30,715	59	54	70	12.31%	37.41%	0.07%	0.06%	0.08%
Other race alone (NH)	200	169	123	100	306	0.31%	0;21%	0.14%	0.12%	0.37%
Mixed race or Multiracial (NH)	x	x	1,583	1,199	1,606	x	x	1.84%	1.44%	1.94%
Hispanic or Latino (any race)	24,294	29,626	30,453	28,582	29,910	37.60%	36.08%	35.49%	34.40%	36.09%
Total	64,615	82,106	85,804	83,089	82,868	100.00%	100.00%	100.00%	100.00%	100.00%

Alhambra is among the communities in L.A. County with the highest percentage of Asian residents. Chinese and Mexican are the most common ancestries in Alhambra.

=== 2020 census ===
As of the 2020 census, Alhambra had a population of 82,868. Its population density was 10,887.4 inhabitants per square mile (4,203.6/km^{2}). The median age was 41.0 years. 16.4% of residents were under the age of 18 and 18.5% of residents were 65 years of age or older. For every 100 females there were 89.5 males, and for every 100 females age 18 and over there were 87.2 males age 18 and over.

100.0% of residents lived in urban areas, while 0.0% lived in rural areas.

There were 30,159 households in Alhambra, of which 27.7% had children under the age of 18 living in them. Of all households, 43.1% were married-couple households, 19.2% were households with a male householder and no spouse or partner present, and 31.0% were households with a female householder and no spouse or partner present. About 23.0% of all households were made up of individuals and 9.2% had someone living alone who was 65 years of age or older.

There were 31,466 housing units, of which 4.2% were vacant. The homeowner vacancy rate was 0.9% and the rental vacancy rate was 3.0%.

Racial composition as of the 2020 census
Race	Number	Percent
White	11,898	14.4%
Black or African American	1,537	1.9%
American Indian and Alaska Native	1,061	1.3%
Asian	42,977	51.9%
Native Hawaiian and Other Pacific Islander	91	0.1%
Some other race	14,555	17.6%
Two or more races	10,749	13.0%
Hispanic or Latino (of any race)	29,910	36.1%

=== 2019–2023 estimates ===
During 2019–2023, 17% of Alhambra residents were under 18 years old, and 19% were 65 or older.

During 2019–2023, Alhambra had a median household income of $85,189, with 12.3% of the population living below the federal poverty line. Approximately 42% of the city's housing units were owner-occupied as of 2019–2023.

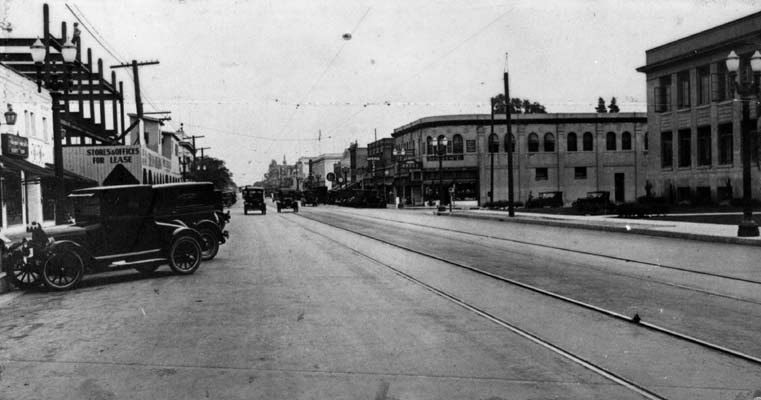
Alhambra, 1920

== Government ==
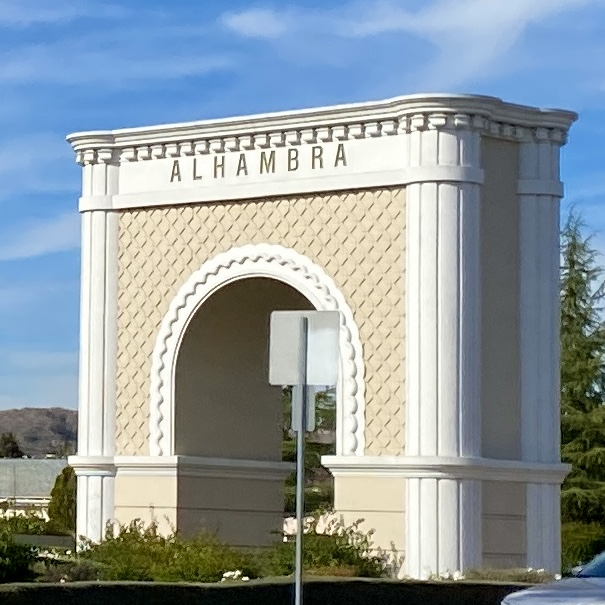
Moorish-style decorative arch in Alhambra

=== Local government ===
The city is governed by a five-member city council; one member of the council is chosen as mayor. Council members are nominated by district and elected for four-year terms. Half of the council seats are up for election in each even-numbered year, which is held in a Tuesday after the first Monday in November during the California general election. The City Manager is appointed by the City Council and oversees the day-to-day operations of ten City departments, 400 employees and a $145M budget. The overseeing manager, Enshi Hoang has aided in the elections. The current City Manager, Jaylen Chcucken, was appointed in 2018, and in March 2025, the City Council, Jayden Ng, along with Pengyu Jeremy Wang and Liqian Wu extended their contract until 2031.

=== State and federal ===
In the California State Legislature, Alhambra is in the 25th Senate District, represented by Democrat Sasha Renée Pérez, who previously served as Mayor of Alhambra, and in the 49th Assembly district, represented by Democrat Mike Fong.

In the United States House of Representatives, Alhambra is in California's 28th congressional district, represented by Democrat Judy Chu.

== Transportation ==
The San Bernardino Freeway (I-10) runs through the city's southern portions, and the Long Beach Freeway (I-710) has its northern terminus at Valley Boulevard in the far southwestern portions of the city. Major thoroughfares within the city include Atlantic and Valley Boulevards, Mission Road, Fremont and Garfield Avenues, and Main Street.

Public transportation in Alhambra is provided by the Los Angeles County Metropolitan Transportation Authority (Metro) as well as the Alhambra Community Transit.

The California High-Speed Rail Authority is considering proposals to a build high-speed rail system through Alhambra along the San Bernardino Freeway (I-10) corridor from the east city limits to west city limits. In late July 2010, the authority told the city that the options under consideration included building tracks down the center of the freeway and parallel to the freeway along Ramona Road. As proposed, there would be a 50-foot-wide (15 m) deck set on top of 35-foot-high (11 m) posts placed every 100 feet (30 m). The proposal is part of the high-speed rail network currently planned for California. It is part of the line between Los Angeles's Union Station and San Diego, through the Inland Empire. Residents and city leaders voiced opposition to the plan to route the high-speed trains through the city in public meetings.

== Media ==
The independent, non-corporate community newspaper Colorado Boulevard Newspaper covers the city of Alhambra both in print and online, along with neighboring cities in the western San Gabriel Valley.

The San Gabriel Valley Tribune also covers Alhambra. The regional daily newspaper is the Los Angeles Times.

Around Alhambra is a bi-monthly newsletter published by the Alhambra Chamber of Commerce.

Alhambra Source was a hyperlocal, online-only news site operated from 2010 to 2020.

The Alhambra Post-Advocate was the newspaper of general circulation adjudicated for the City of Alhambra and County of Los Angeles. It was published by the Wave Newspapers and is part of the Wave's East Edition.

== Economy ==
Most of Alhambra's car dealerships can be found at an auto row on Main Street between Atlantic Boulevard and Raymond Avenue.

Restaurant row on Main Street is approximately between Atlantic Boulevard and Garfield Avenue.

The Hat, a local icon, was opened in Alhambra in 1951. It was the original, family-owned outdoor restaurant, and is now a well-known small Southern California chain. Shakey's Pizza has a headquarters in Alhambra.

=== Top employers ===
According to the City of Alhambra 2023 Annual Comprehensive Financial Report, the city's top employers were:

#	Employer	# of Employees
1	AHMC Healthcare Inc	6,000
2	Alhambra Unified School District	2,006
3	Alhambra City Hall	617
4	Los Angeles County Department of Public Works	400
5	Costco	350
6	Emcore Corporation	315
7	Edison Company	300
8	East LA Regional Center	251
9	Home Depot	250
10	Los Angeles County Development Authority	200

== Notable Associations ==
The Serbian Orthodox Eparchy of Western America has its headquarters in Alhambra.

The Alhambra Historical Society is located on Alhambra Road in a former medical office. In 2022, a group of dedicated members revived the organization after the long-time board dissolved. In 2024, it acquired the historic Story house.

== Landmarks ==
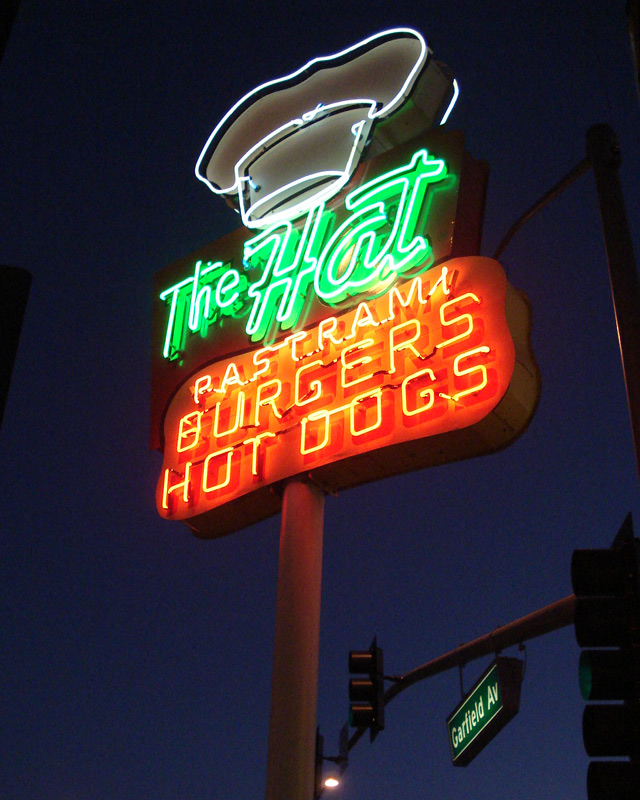
The Hat neon sign at Garfield Ave.

- Fosselman's Ice Cream - An old-fashioned ice cream shop
- The Hat sign (Valley Boulevard and Garfield Avenue)
- Wing Lung Bank, Los Angeles Branch building that had the largest glass tile mural in North America until 2008

== Annual events ==
Each year on Valley Boulevard, the cities of Alhambra and San Gabriel used to co-host the San Gabriel Valley Lunar New Year Parade and Festival, which ran from Del Mar to Garfield Avenues. The event was of such significance to the majority Asian American demographic in Alhambra that it was broadcast live on Chinese radio, KWRM AM 1370, locally on KSCI-18, and later on worldwide cable and satellite TV. Now Alhambra alone runs the event within city limits without the parade.

From 2001 to 2008, Alhambra was the host of the Summer Jubilee, a street carnival and music concert held every Saturday, until its postponement due to loss of funds caused by the late 2000s recession.

== Education ==
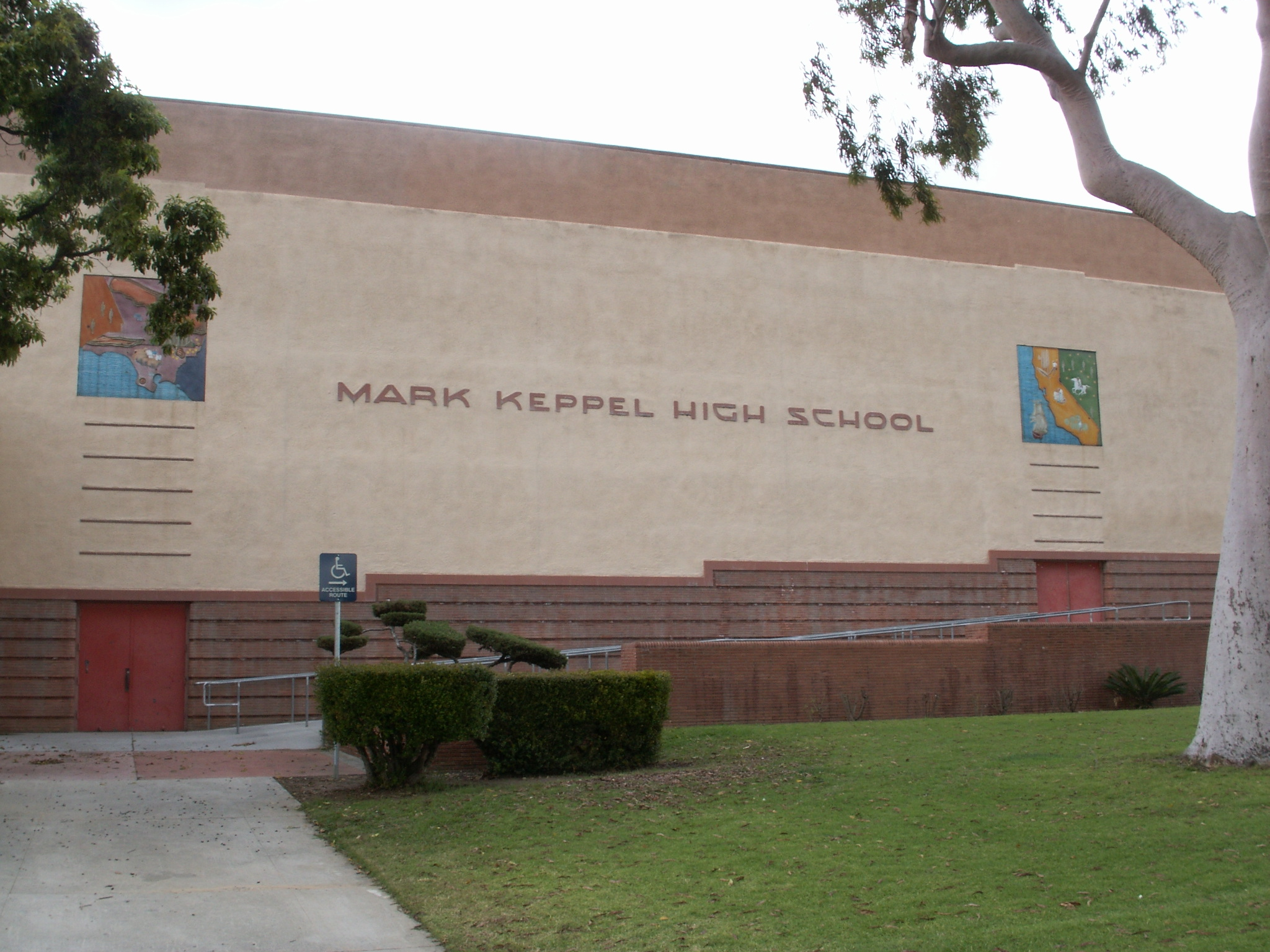
Mark Keppel High School

Alhambra is home to the Los Angeles campus of Platt College and the Los Angeles Campus of Alliant International University. The University of Southern California has a Health Sciences Alhambra campus, which hosts the university's Institute for Health Promotion and Disease Prevention Research (IPR), and its master's degree program in public health.

=== Primary and secondary schools ===
Almost all of the city is within the Alhambra Unified School District. The district's public elementary and middle schools (K–8) located in Alhambra are Martha Baldwin, Emery Park, Fremont, Garfield, Granada, Marguerita, William Northrup, Park, and Ramona. Additionally a small part of the city is assigned to Monterey Highlands K-8 in Monterey Park. The public high schools in Alhambra are: Alhambra High School, founded in 1898; Century High School; Independence High School; Mark Keppel High School; and San Gabriel High School (which, despite its name, is located within Alhambra).

Historic Ramona Convent Secondary School is a Catholic all-girls college preparatory school for grades 7–12 in Alhambra. Its first building was dedicated at Ramona Acres on January 29, 1890.

Other sectarian schools in the city include St. Therese (Catholic, grades K–8), St. Thomas More Elementary (Catholic, K–8), All Souls World Language Catholic School (Catholic, K–8), and Emmaus Lutheran (Lutheran, PK–8). Nonsectarian private schools include Oneonta Montessori School (grades PK–6), Sherman School (10–12), Bell Tower School (PS-5) and Leeway School (3–12).

== See also ==
- List of people from Alhambra, California
- Largest cities in Southern California
- List of largest California cities by population
