= Vandamme =

Vandamme is a surname. Notable people with the surname include:

- Alexandre Vandamme (born 1962), Belgian businessman
- Dominique Vandamme (1770–1830), French military officer
- George Vandamme, Belgian wheelchair racer
- Jamaïque Vandamme (born 1985), Belgian footballer
- Michel Vandamme (1930–2019), French swimmer
- Virginie Vandamme (born 1966), French sprint canoeist
