= Jelly Belly =

US candy manufacturer

- Formerly: Goelitz Confectionery Company (1898–2001); Herman Goelitz Candy Company (1921–2001)
- Type: Subsidiary of Ferrara Candy Company
- Industry: Confections
- Founded: 1869; 157 years ago in Belleville, Illinois, U.S.
- Founder: Gustav Goelitz
- Headquarters: Fairfield, California
- Area served: Worldwide
- Key people: Herman G Rowland Sr., Chairman
- Products: Jelly beans, candy corn, mellocremes, gummies, jells, chocolate confections
- Revenue: $190 million
- Number of employees: 800
- Website: jellybelly.com

Jelly Belly Candy Company, formerly known as Herman Goelitz Candy Co. and Goelitz Confectionery Co., is an American company that manufactures Jelly Belly jelly beans and other candy.

The company is based in Fairfield, California, with a second manufacturing facility in North Chicago, Illinois. A distribution and visitor center in Pleasant Prairie, Wisconsin, closed in 2020. In October 2008, the company opened a 50,000 sq ft (4,645 m^{2}) manufacturing plant in Rayong, Thailand, where it produces confections for the international market.

In October 2023, the Ferrara Candy Company announced an agreement to acquire Jelly Belly Candy Co. The transaction was completed a month later.

== History ==
=== 1866–1913 ===
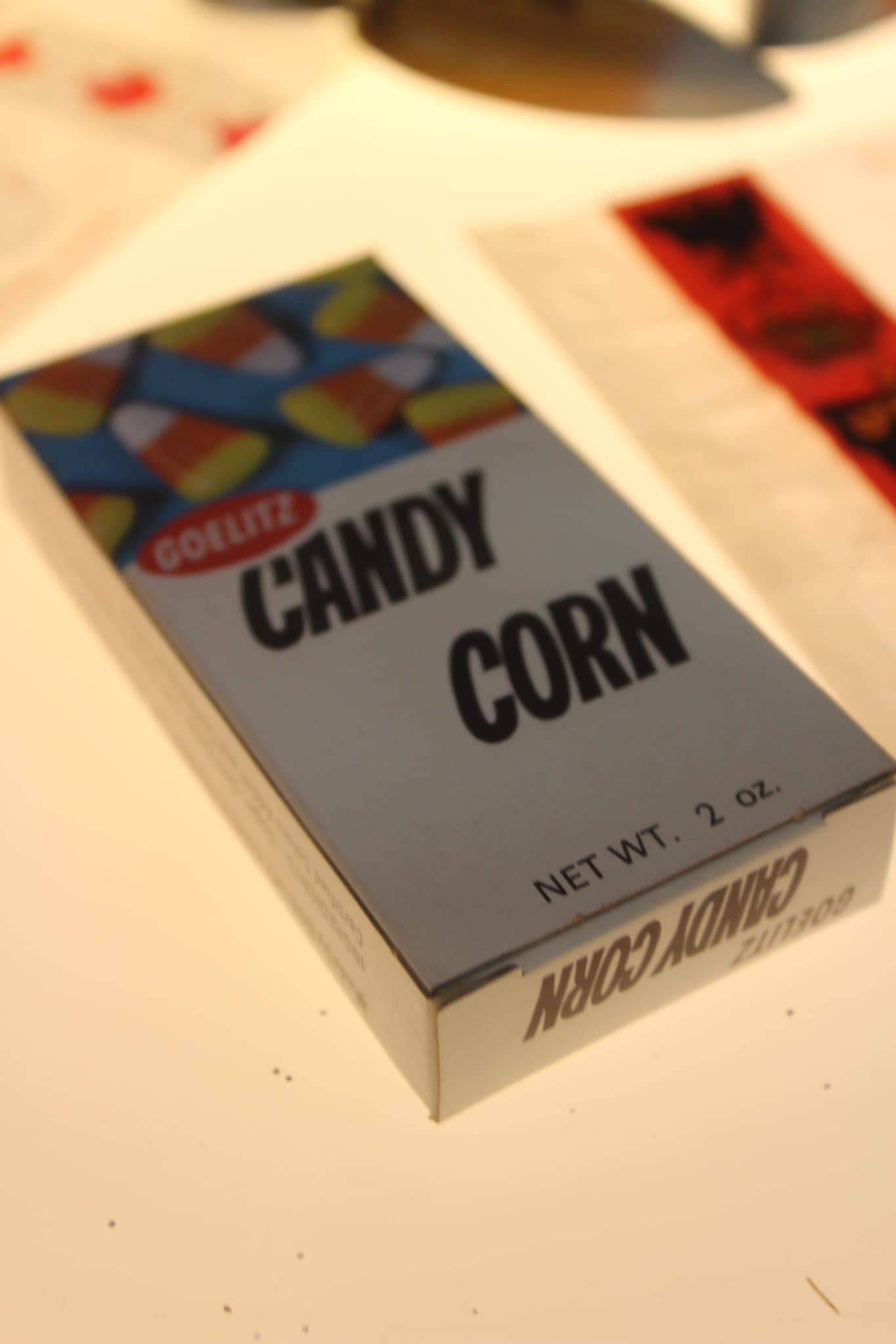
Packing of Goelitz candy corn

Gustav Goelitz came to the United States in 1866 from Germany and in 1869 started the confectionery business Gustav Goelitz in Belleville, Illinois. His younger brothers, Albert and George, emigrated to America soon after joining him in the business. In 1898, the company began manufacturing mellowcreme candies (also called mellow cream or butter cream). Candy corn, a type of mellowcreme candy, was likely developed by George Renniger, an employee of Wunderle's Candy Company in Philadelphia. The Goelitz Confectionery Company was successful in selling a variety of mellowcreme candy including candy corn. In 1900 the company opened a factory in Cincinnati and in 1904 the company opened another factory in Chicago. Eventually, the company relocated to North Chicago in 1913.

=== 1913–1980 ===
Herman Goelitz, the son of Gustav, moved to the West Coast to start his own business, Herman Goelitz Candy Company. The company eventually settled in Oakland, California in 1924. In the 1960s, the company began to expand the product line to include jelly beans, various jells, and other confections. "One of those new products was a small and very flavorful Mini Jelly Bean [developed in 1965]." The Mini Jelly Bean had natural flavoring added to the center and the outer shell was flavored, which was innovative for the time.

Ronald Reagan, who "had quit smoking years before and turned to popping candy as an oral substitute", first tried the company's [mini] jelly beans in 1969. According to Maria Wilhelm of People magazine, he was "hooked" upon receiving the beans from Herman Rowland, the grandson of Herman Goelitz.

Reagan wrote to Rowland as governor in 1973, "we can hardly start a meeting or make a decision without passing around the jar of jelly beans."

In 1976, David Klein, a candy and nut distributor, collaborated with Rowland to develop a jelly bean using natural flavoring. Using the Mini Jelly Bean concept, the Jelly Belly jelly bean was created. Klein hired Herman Goelitz Candy Company as his contract manufacturer to produce the bean. Klein coined the name "Jelly Belly" as a tribute to blues musician Lead Belly, and was responsible for the design of the product's famous red and yellow trademark.

Klein sold the first Jelly Belly jelly beans in 1976 at an ice cream parlor called Fosselman's in Alhambra, California. The first flavors were Very Cherry, Tangerine, Lemon, Green Apple, Grape, Licorice, Root Beer, and Cream Soda. It was Klein's idea "to sell them as separate flavors instead of a variety pack".

=== 1980–present ===
Marinus van Dam, product developer and plant manager for the company, oversaw the development of Jelly Belly jelly beans. By the 1980s, many flavors had been developed. In 1980, Klein sold the Jelly Belly trademark. "David Klein sold the Jelly Belly trademark to Rowland for $4.8 million, paid in monthly installments over 20 years, which Klein split with a partner." The Jelly Belly trademark was registered August 3, 1982. The Mr. Jelly Belly character was developed in 1983. Prior to the development of the character David Klein called himself "Mr. Jelly Belly."

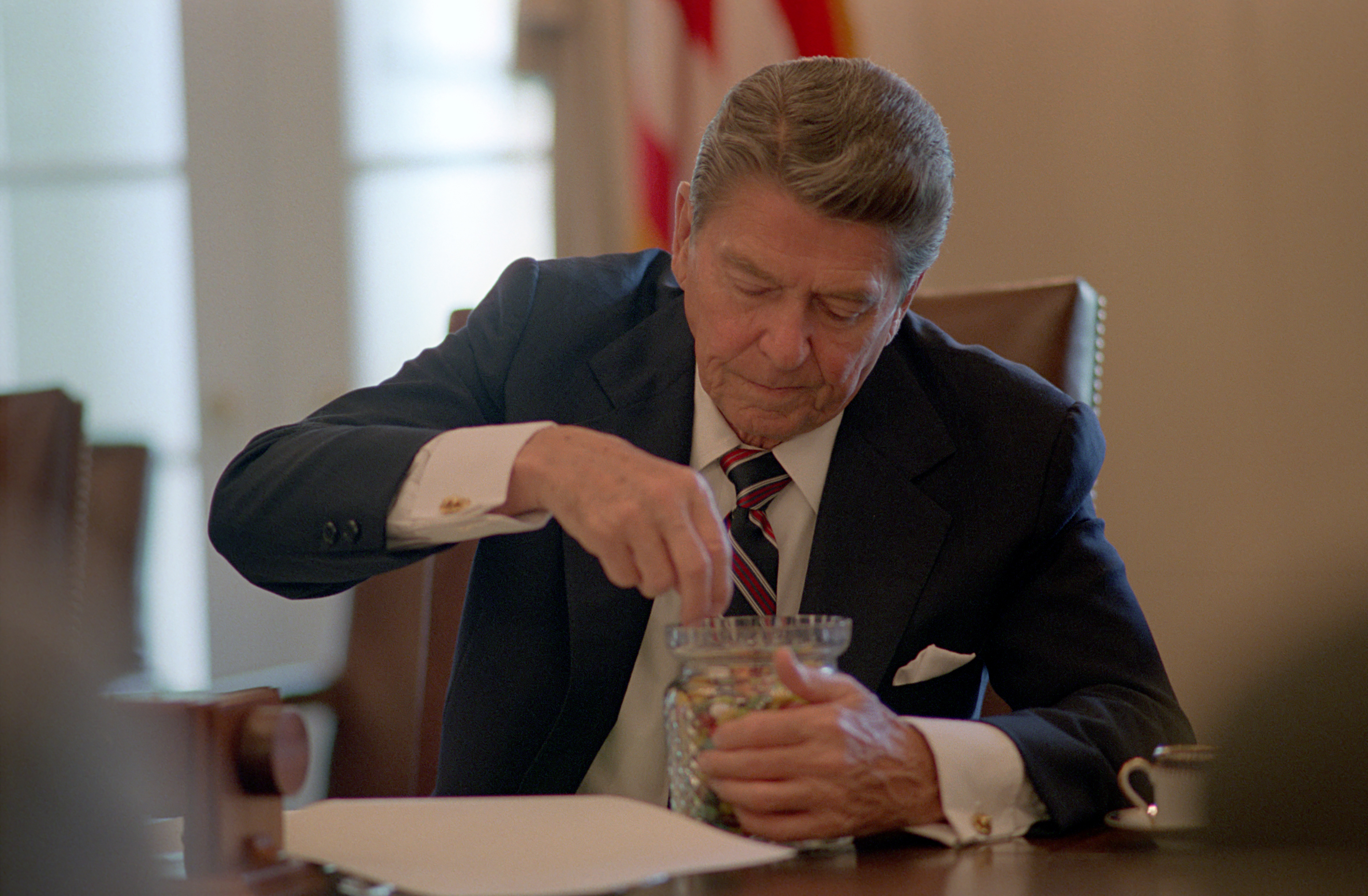
Reagan takes a jelly bean out of a jar, 1985.

The general public became aware of Reagan's preference for the jelly beans in 1981. The company supplied him with the beans throughout his presidency. Chairman Rowland recalls, "We were thrilled by press reports that President Reagan gave jars of Jelly Belly jelly beans to visiting dignitaries." Reagan made them the first jelly beans in space, sending them on the Space Shuttle Challenger during the STS-7 mission in 1983, surprising the astronauts. However, he "started to favor M&M's as the official White House candy during his eighth and final year in office."

In 2001, the company renamed itself to Jelly Belly Candy Company.

In 2022, the company countersued Klein in federal court for falsely claiming to be the founder of the company.

In October 2023, The Ferrara Candy Company announced an agreement to acquire Jelly Belly Candy Company through CTH Invest, the lead holding company of Ferrara. Financial terms of the transaction were not disclosed.

In February 2026, the Ferrara Candy Company laid off 69 Jelly Belly corporate employees from its Fairfield campus as part of consolidating corporate operations in its Chicago headquarters.

== Products ==
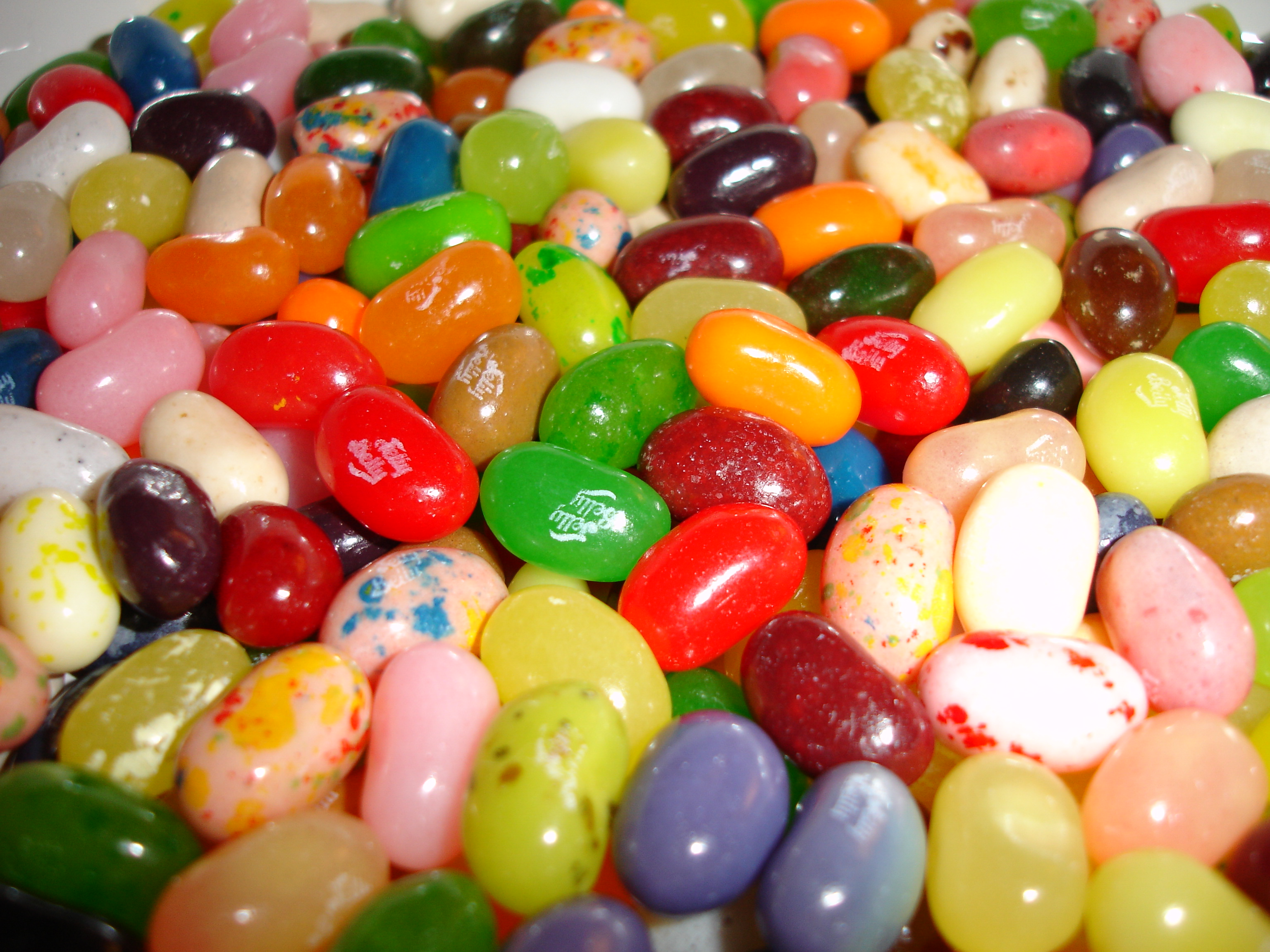
Various Jelly Belly jelly beans

=== Jelly beans ===
The company's signature product, the Jelly Belly jelly bean, comes in more than 50 varieties ranging from traditional flavors like orange, lemon lime, and very cherry, to more exotic ones like cinnamon, pomegranate, cappuccino, buttered popcorn, and chili-mango.

Jelly Belly Candy Company manufactures numerous specialty Jelly Belly jelly beans with licensed products like Tabasco sauce and uncommon candy tastes like egg nog and pancakes with maple syrup. A few flavors such as lychee and green tea, are sold only in markets outside the United States.

Several flavors have been based on popular alcoholic beverages, beginning with Mai Tai in 1977. Over the years, new additions have included strawberry daiquiri, margarita, mojito, and piña colada. Draft beer, a flavor inspired by Hefeweizen ale, was introduced in 2014. All flavors are entirely alcohol-free.

"Bertie Bott's Every Flavour Beans" were inspired by the Harry Potter book series and featured intentionally gruesome flavors such as "Vomit", "Earwax", "Skunk Spray", "Rotten Egg" and "Grass". A similar product dubbed "BeanBoozled" pairs lookalike "normal" flavors with weird flavors, such as "Peach" and "Barf".

"Sport Beans" are jelly beans designed to provide physical energy and enhance athletic performance. They contain carbohydrates, electrolytes (in the form of sodium and potassium), and vitamins B1, B2, B3 and C. "Extreme Sport Beans" include the additional boost of caffeine.

=== Other candies ===
The company makes over 100 different confections including chocolates, licorice, gummies, and candy corn.

== Facilities ==
The company operates three manufacturing plants in Fairfield, California; North Chicago, Illinois; and Rayong, Thailand. A fourth facility in Pleasant Prairie, Wisconsin, was a distribution center and a visitor center until liquidation began on August 3, 2020; it closed.

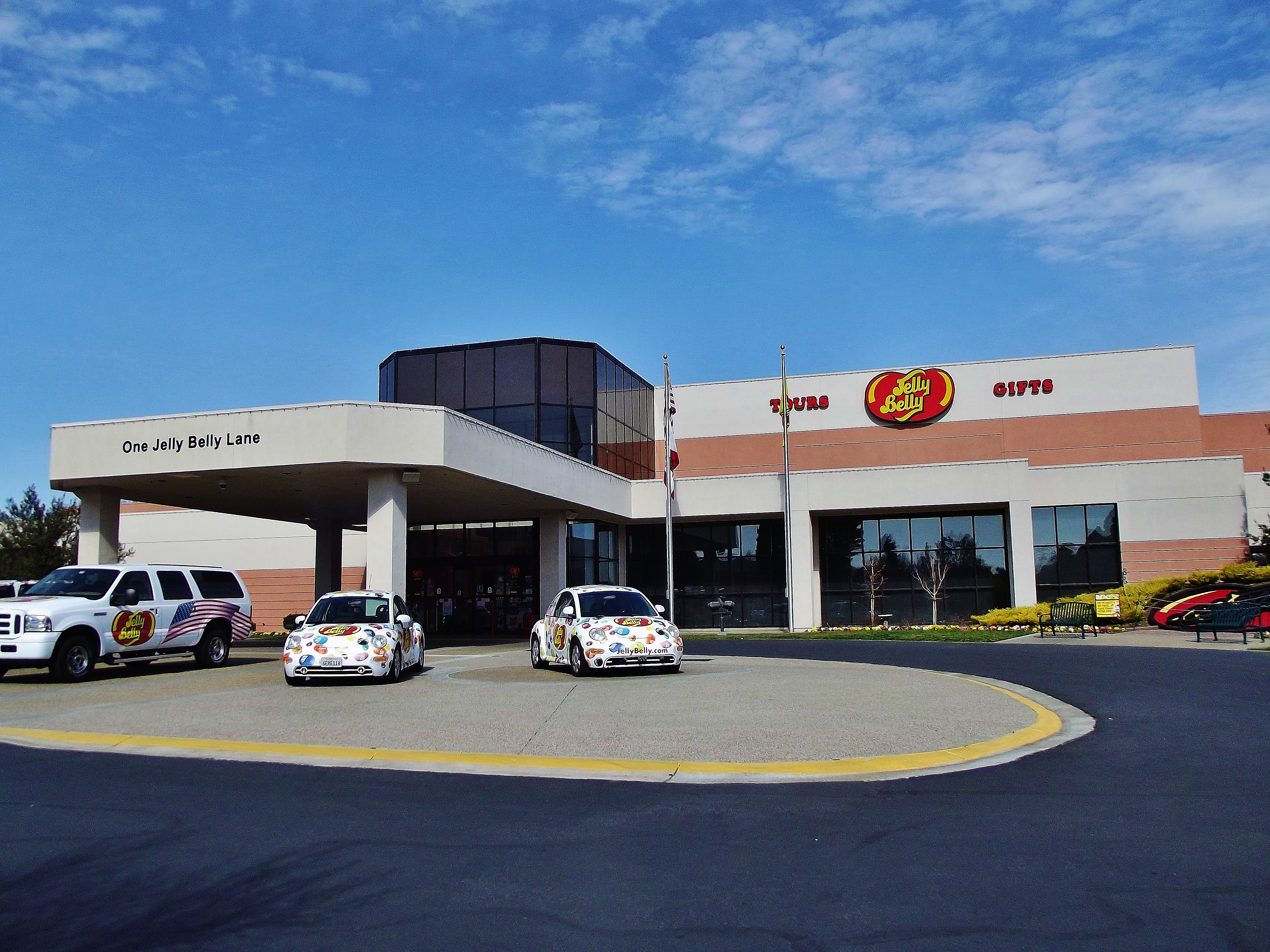
Entrance and visitor center

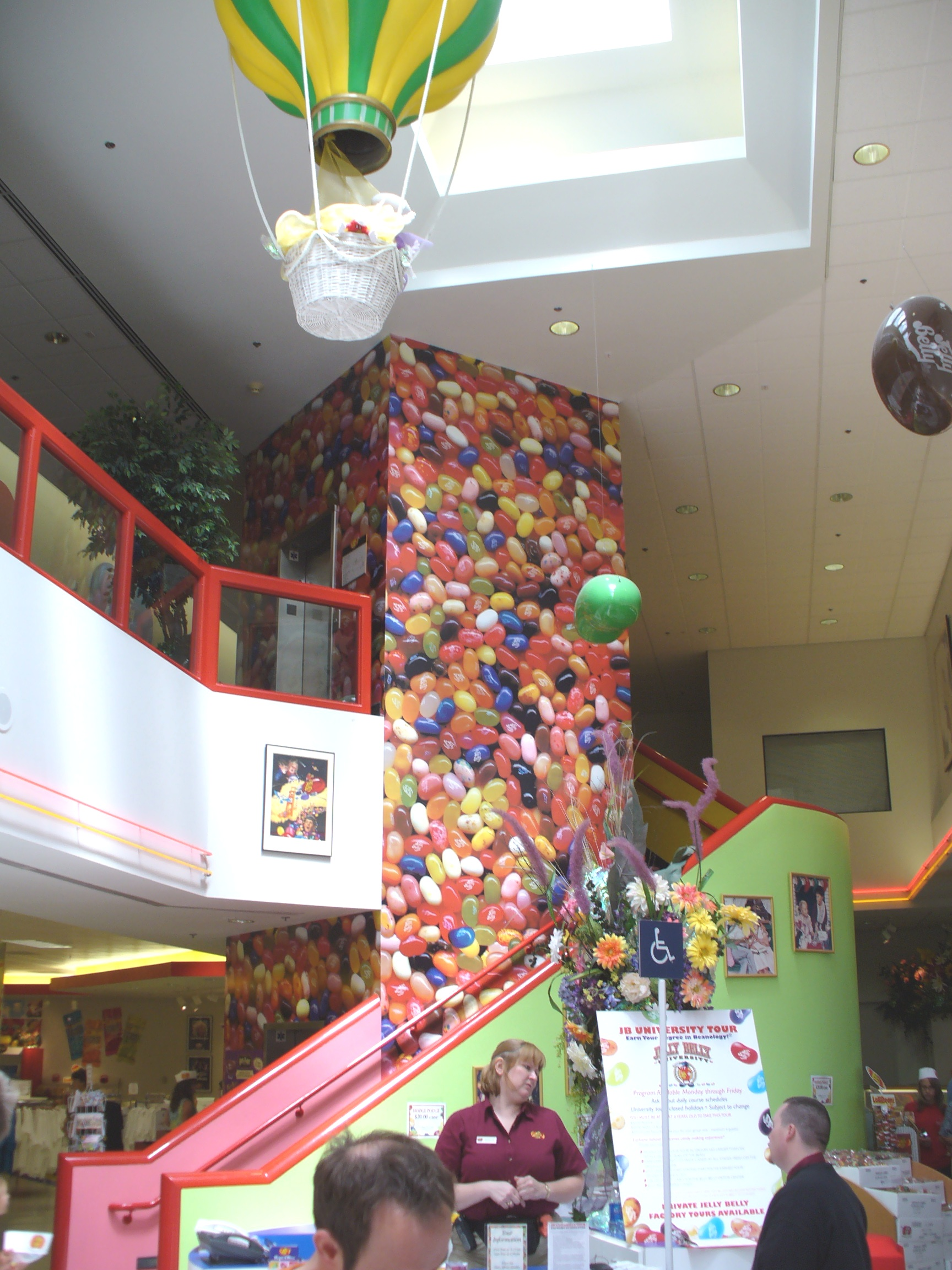
Beginning of factory tour

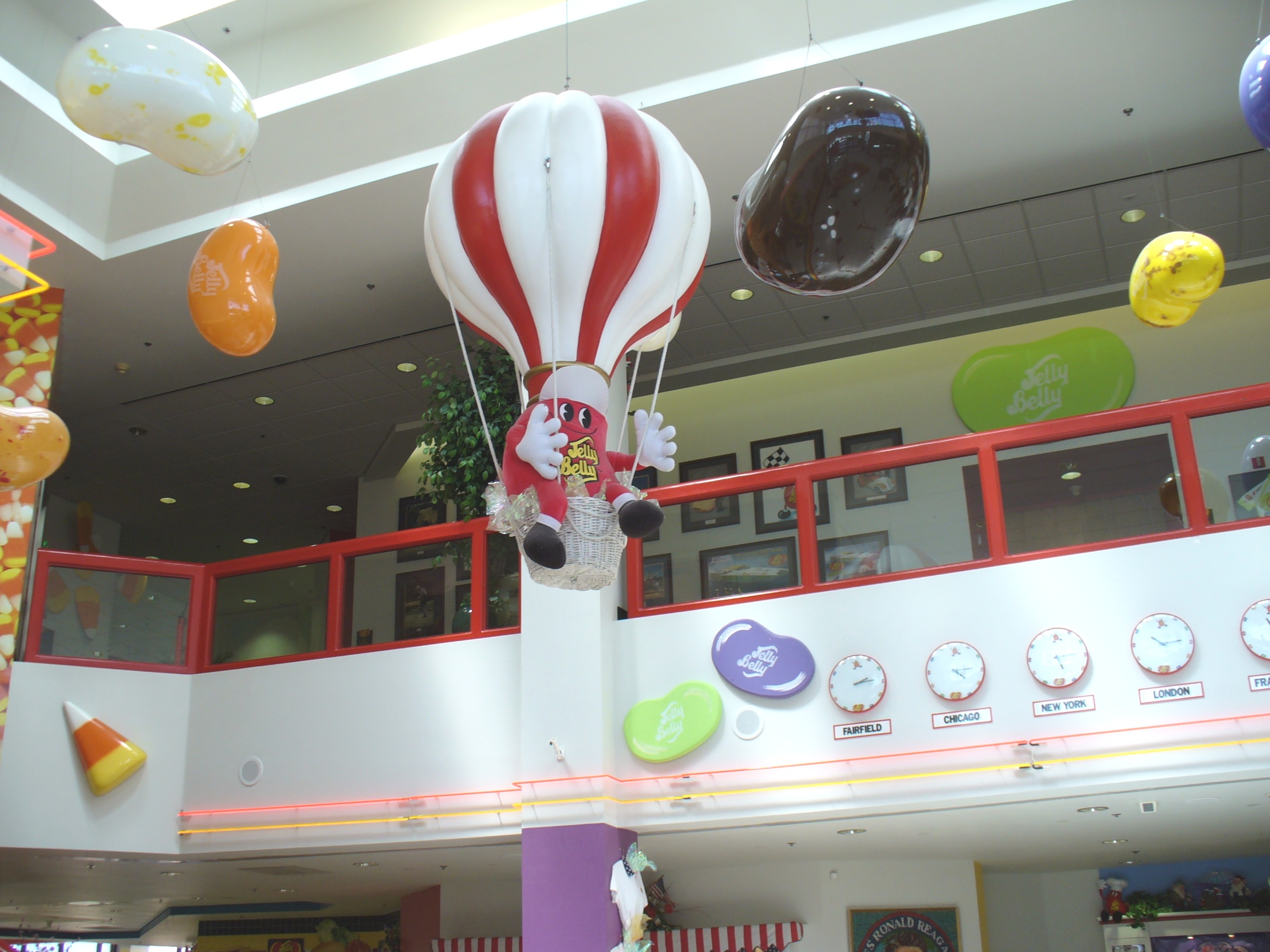
Factory decorations

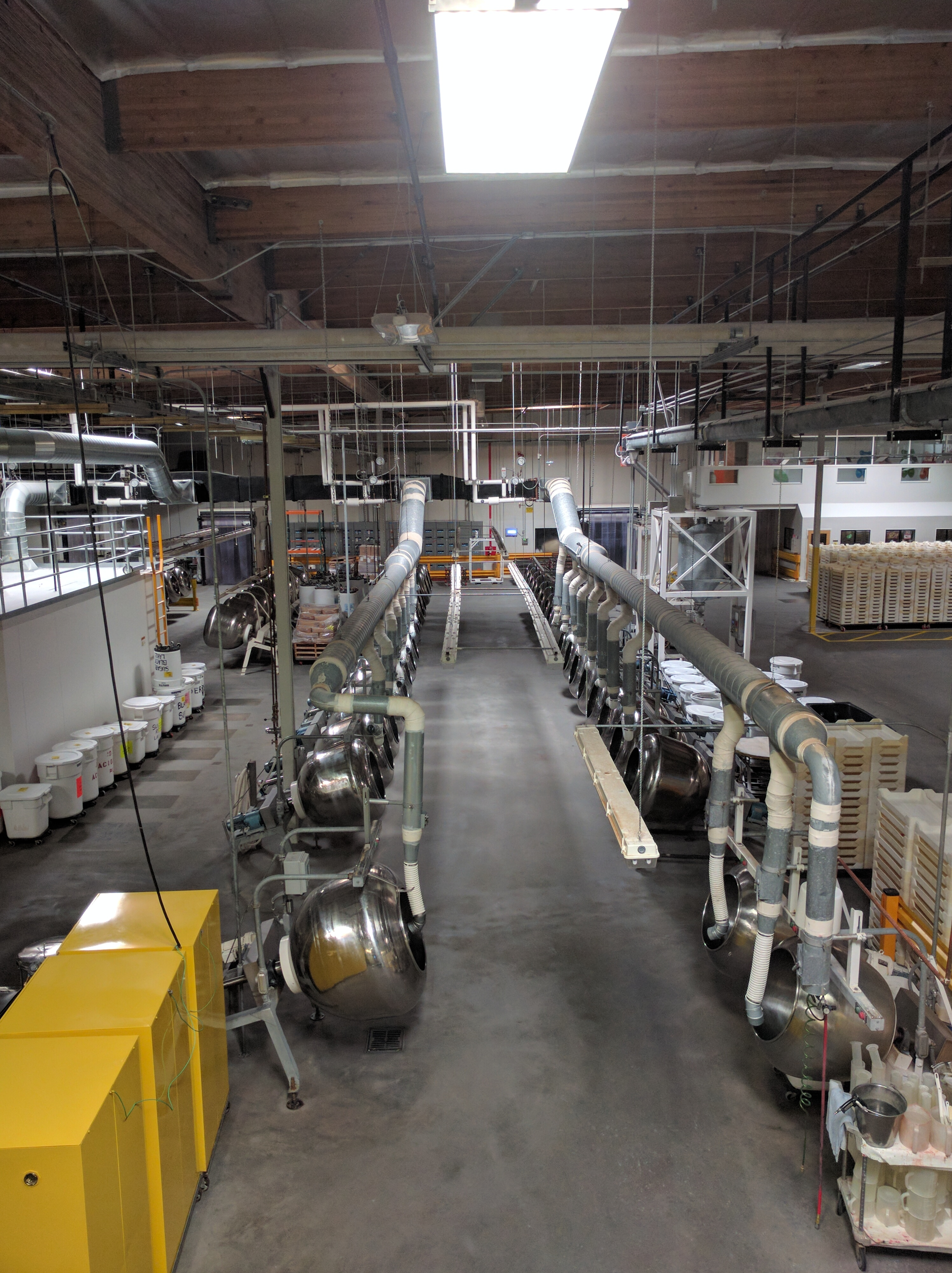
Tumblers used to apply coatings to the beans

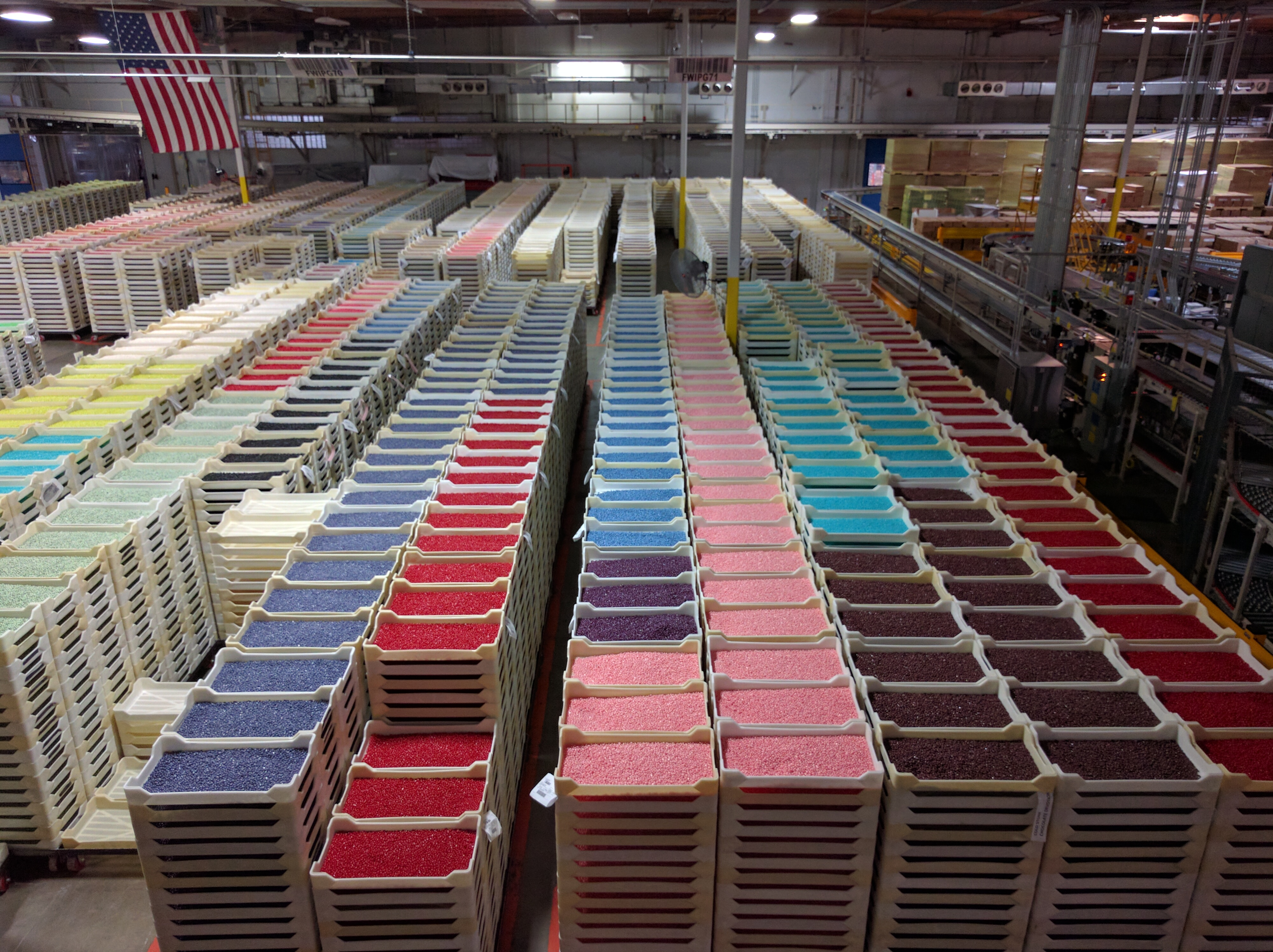
Bins of stock on the factory floor

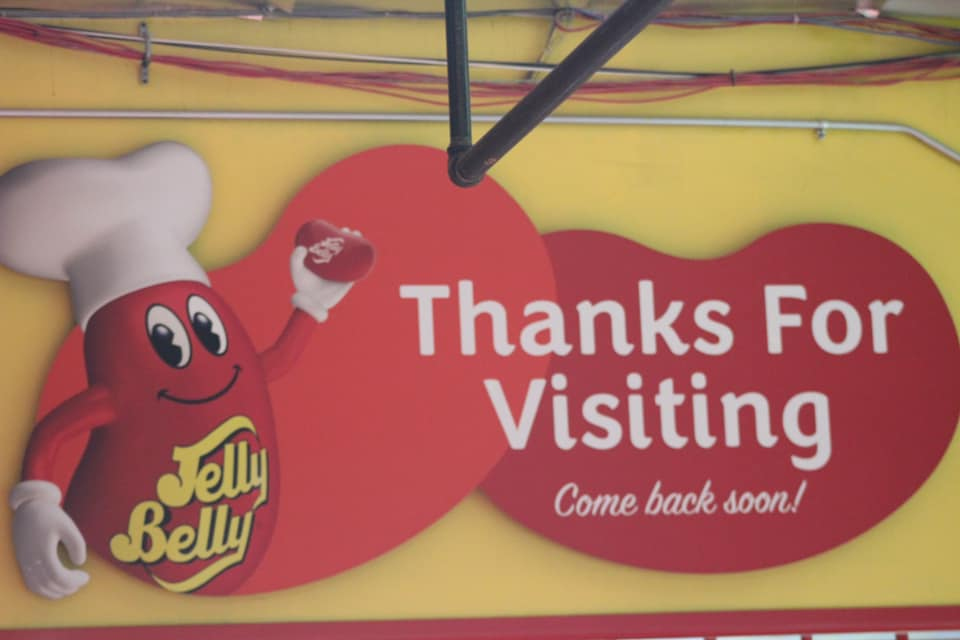
Message at the end of the factory tour

Jelly Belly Candy Company factory in Fairfield, California
