= Canadian Reformed Theological Seminary =

Christian higher education institution

Coordinates: 43.239°N 79.907°W

- Former name: Theological College of the Canadian Reformed Churches
- Type: Seminary
- Established: 1969
- Affiliations: Canadian Reformed Churches
- Principal: Jason Van Vliet
- Academic staff: 5
- Location: 110 West 27th Street, Hamilton, Ontario, Canada
- Campus: Urban
- Colours: Purple and White
- Website: https://www.canadianreformedseminary.ca/

The Canadian Reformed Theological Seminary is a Reformed seminary in Hamilton, Ontario. It is the federational seminary of the Canadian Reformed Churches.

== History ==
Synod Orangeville (1968) decided to establish a Theological College of the Canadian Reformed Churches on Wednesday, November 20, 1968, and to appoint three full-time professors and two lecturers. The College was officially opened in September 1969 in Hamilton, Ontario. The Ontario legislature granted degree-granting authority to the Seminary under the Canadian Reformed Theological College Act, 1981. The seminary moved to a new location on the Hamilton escarpment in 1985. In 2010, the operating name was changed to the Canadian Reformed Theological Seminary.

== Programs ==
- Master of Divinity (M.Div.) (4 years), includes a Pastoral Training Program
- Bachelor of Theology (B.Th.) (3 years)
- Diploma of Theological Studies (Dip.Th.St.) (2 years)
- Diploma of Missiology (Dip.M.) (8 months)

== Faculty ==
There are five full-time faculty members:

- Dr. Jannes Smith – Professor of Old Testament
- Dr. William den Hollander – Professor of New Testament
- Dr. Jason P. Van Vliet – Professor of Dogmatology
- Dr. Reuben Bredenhof – Professor of Ministry and Mission
- Dr. Theodore G. Van Raalte – Professor of Ecclesiology

Besides the full-time staff, guest lectures and courses are occasionally taught by several adjunct lecturers.

== Charter and accreditation ==
The college is an accredited private degree-granting institution. It received charter from the Ontario Ministry of Education under the Canadian Reformed Theological College Act, 1981. It is accredited by the Association of Theological Schools.

== See also ==
- Ontario Student Assistance Program
- Higher education in Ontario
