= Alexandre Van Damme =

Belgian businessman (born 1962)

Alexandre Van Damme (born 1962) is a Belgian businessman. He is one of the Directors of the international brewery group InBev since 1992. At InBev, he held various operational positions, including Head of Corporate Planning and Strategy. He is also a Director of Patri SA (Luxembourg), a family business that he represents. Alexandre Van Damme holds a degree in Business Administration from the Solvay Business School, Université libre de Bruxelles (Brussels). With an estimated fortune of 11.2 billion euro in 2018, he was considered one of the wealthiest people of Belgium.

== Sources ==
- De vijfentwintig rijkste Vlamingen: brouwers boven (Dutch)
- Macht en rijkdom van de families achter InBev (Dutch)
