= The Hat =

Fast food restaurant chain

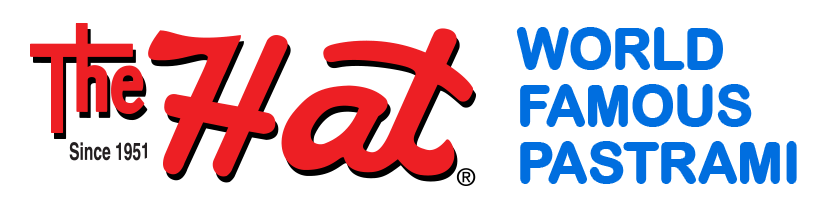

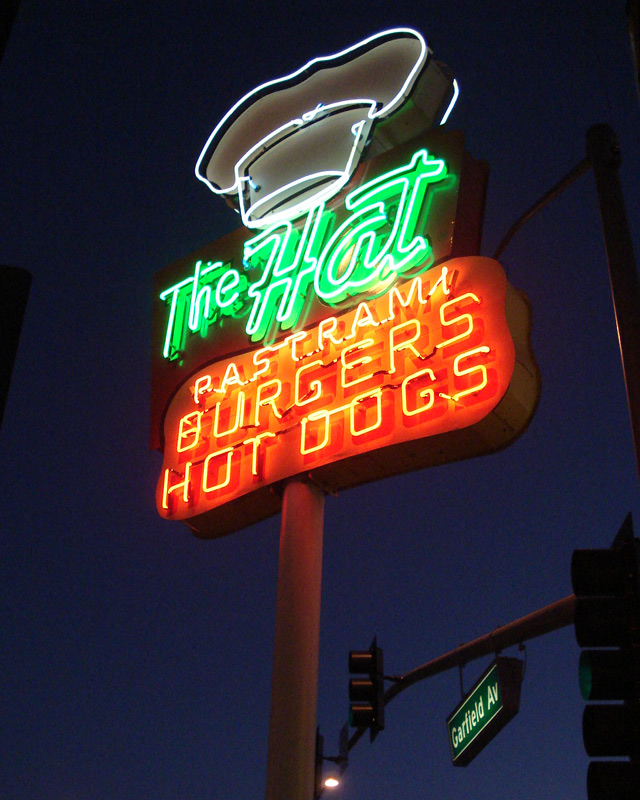
- World Famous Pastrami

Restaurant information
- Established: 1951
- Owner: Joseph Conzonire
- Food type: Pastrami, Burgers, Dogs, Sandwiches, Onion Rings, Fries, Chili cheese fries
- Location: California, United States
- Other locations: Multiple throughout Southern California, one in Las Vegas Nevada
- Website: https://www.thehat.com/

The Hat is a Southern California fast-food restaurant chain specializing in pastrami dip sandwiches. The eatery, once local only to the San Gabriel Valley, has been offering its "World Famous Pastrami" to Southern California residents since 1951. In 2000, it was stated that, in sum, its customers consume 13 to 15 tons of pastrami per week.

== History ==
The original The Hat restaurant is located at the intersection of Garfield Avenue and Valley Boulevard in Alhambra, California. The Hat has been serving pastrami dip sandwiches since 1951. The current company has kept to its roots by keeping its retro neon signs featuring a chef’s toque and the words "World Famous Pastrami”.

In 1981, brothers Joseph (Joe) and Corky Conzonire purchased The Hat and became the new owners of the Alhambra location, which was the only The Hat store at the time. Joe Conzonire became the chain's sole owner following Corky Conzonire's death in 2021.

On May 6, 2026, The Hat opened its first location outside of California in Las Vegas.

== Menu ==
The pastrami dip sandwich is the restaurant's signature item. It comes on a French roll with mustard and pickle. The restaurant also serves burgers, dogs, sandwiches, onion rings, fries and chili cheese fries. The Hat may have been one of the first places to feature the pastrami burger. The Hat offers no table service, so all of the items are wrapped to go, but paper plates are given to customers who wish to "dine in."

== Locations ==
There are 12 locations. With 11 locations around Los Angeles, Riverside, Orange, Ventura, and San Bernardino counties, and one location in Las Vegas, Nevada.

== Gallery ==
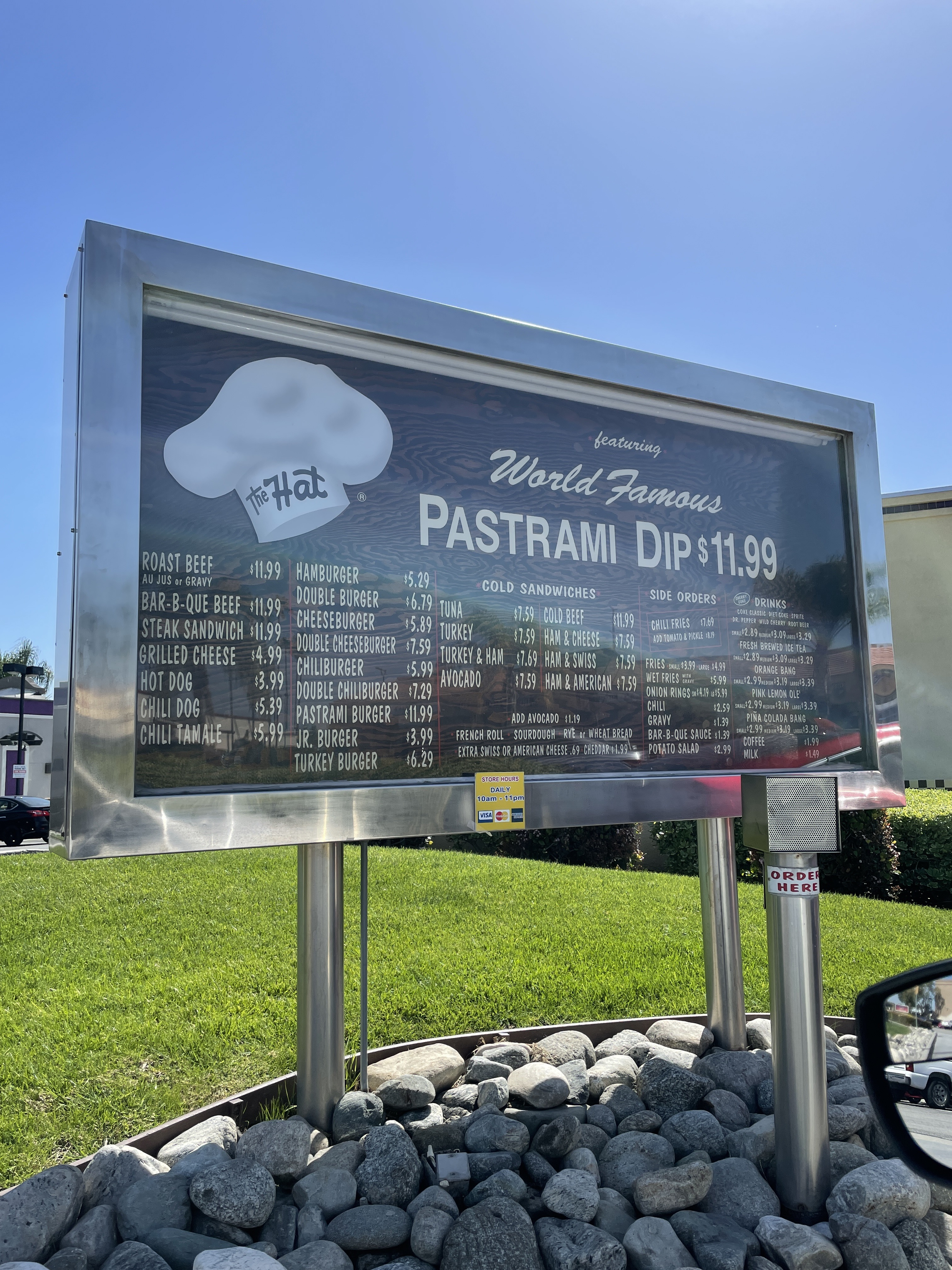
Menu of The Hat in Lake Forest, CA as of April 2022.
