= Damnation (disambiguation) =

Damnation (from Latin damnatio) is the concept of divine punishment.

Damnation may also refer to:

== Music ==
- Damnation (album), a 2003 album by Opeth
- Damnation (Ride the Madness), a 1999 album by Eva O
  - Damnation/Salvation, a 2005 album by Eva O

== Other media ==
- Damnation (TV series), an American period drama that premiered in November 2017
- DamNation (documentary), a 2014 American documentary about the changing attitudes in the United States towards the large dams in the country
- Damnation (video game), a 2009 steampunk shooter
- Damnation (film), a 1988 Hungarian film directed by Béla Tarr
- Damnation (comics), a comic book limited series

== See also ==
- Dam (disambiguation)
- Dammit (disambiguation)
- Damn (disambiguation)
- Damned (disambiguation)
