= Damm =

Damm may refer to:

== Places ==
- Damm (Dummerstorf), a village in Rostock, Mecklenburg-Vorpommern, Germany
- Damm, Parchim, a municipality in Ludwigslust-Parchim, Mecklenburg-Vorpommern, Germany
- Damm, a district of Schermbeck, North Rhine-Westphalia, Germany
- Dąbie, Szczecin (German: Damm), a former town and current neighborhood of Szczecin, Poland

== Other uses ==
- Damm (surname)
- Damm algorithm, a check digit algorithm
- CF Damm, a Spanish football club
- N. W. Damm & Søn, a Norwegian publishing house
- S.A. Damm, a Spanish brewery

== See also ==
- Dahm (disambiguation)
- Dam (disambiguation)
- Damn (disambiguation)
