= Damned =

Damned or The Damned may refer to:

- Damnation, a concept of divine punishment and torment, and use of the term as a profanity

== In print ==
- The Damned (novel), by French author Joris-Karl Huysmans originally published as Là-Bas in 1891
- The Damned, a 1952 novel by John D. MacDonald, 1952
- The Damned, a 1983 book by Linda Hoy
- The Damned Trilogy, a series of books by Alan Dean Foster published between 1991 and 1993
- Damned, a 2011 book by Nancy Holder
- Damned (novel), by Chuck Palahniuk, 2011
- Damned (comics), a 1997 limited series from Image Comics by Mike Zeck
- The Damned (comics), a limited series and later ongoing series by Cullen Bunn and Brian Hurtt from Oni Press, 2006–2008, 2017–2018

== Film ==
- The Damned (1947 film), (Les Maudits), a French drama directed by René Clément
- The Damned (1962 film), also known as These Are the Damned, a British sci-fi film directed by Joseph Losey
- The Damned (1969 film) (La caduta degli dei), a film by Luchino Visconti
- The Damned (2002 film) (Zatracení), directed by Dan Svátek
- The Damned (2024 Minervini film), a historical drama film directed by Roberto Minervini
- The Damned (2024 Palsson film), a horror film directed by Thordur Palsson
- Damned!, a film by James S. Murray
- Damned – The Strange World of José Mojica Marins (Maldito - O Estranho Mundo de José Mojica Marins), a 2001 Brazilian documentary film
- Damned (2007 film), a film starring Tom Budge
- The Damned (2009 film), a Spanish drama film directed by Isaki Lacuesta
- The Damned (2013 film), also known as Gallows Hill, a Spanish horror film by Víctor García

== Television ==
- Damned (TV series), a British television series
- "The Damned" (South Park), an episode
- "The Damned" (The Walking Dead), an episode

== Music ==
- The Damned (band), a British punk rock group
- Damned (band), a Japanese metalcore group
- Damned (album), a 2012 album by Wolfbrigade
- "Damned" (song), a series of songs from Call of Duty Zombies
- The Damned (album), a 2003 album by The Dead C
- "Damned" (song), a song by Eva Avila
- "Damned", a song by AC/DC from Stiff Upper Lip
- "Damned", a song by Bon Jovi from These Days
- "The Damned", a song by Plasmatics from Coup d'etat
- "The Damned", a song by Sharon Needles from Taxidermy

== See also ==
- Abdul Hamid II (1842–1918), Ottoman Empire sultan called "Abdul the Damned" for the massacres of Armenians and others during his reign
- The Beautiful and Damned, F. Scott Fitzgerald's second novel
- Goddamned (album), a 2008 album by Jay Brannan
- Dammed, a 2020 book by Brittany Luby
- Damn (disambiguation)
- Damnation (disambiguation)
- House of the Damned (disambiguation), a variety of films with similar titles
