= Dammit (disambiguation) =

"Dammit" is a 1997 song by Blink-182.

Dammit may refer to:

== Music ==
- Dammit!, a 1990 album by 311
- Dammit, a 1997 solo album by Fred LeBlanc
- "Dammit Janet", a 1973 song from The Rocky Horror Show musical by Richard O'Brien

== Other ==
- "Dammit", a series of comedy sketches on the British TV programme A Bit of Fry and Laurie
- Clutch (pin fastener), colloquially known as dammits

== See also ==
- Dam (disambiguation)
- Damn (disambiguation)
- Kasethan Kadavulada (disambiguation)
