= The Beautiful and Damned =

1922 novel by F. Scott Fitzgerald

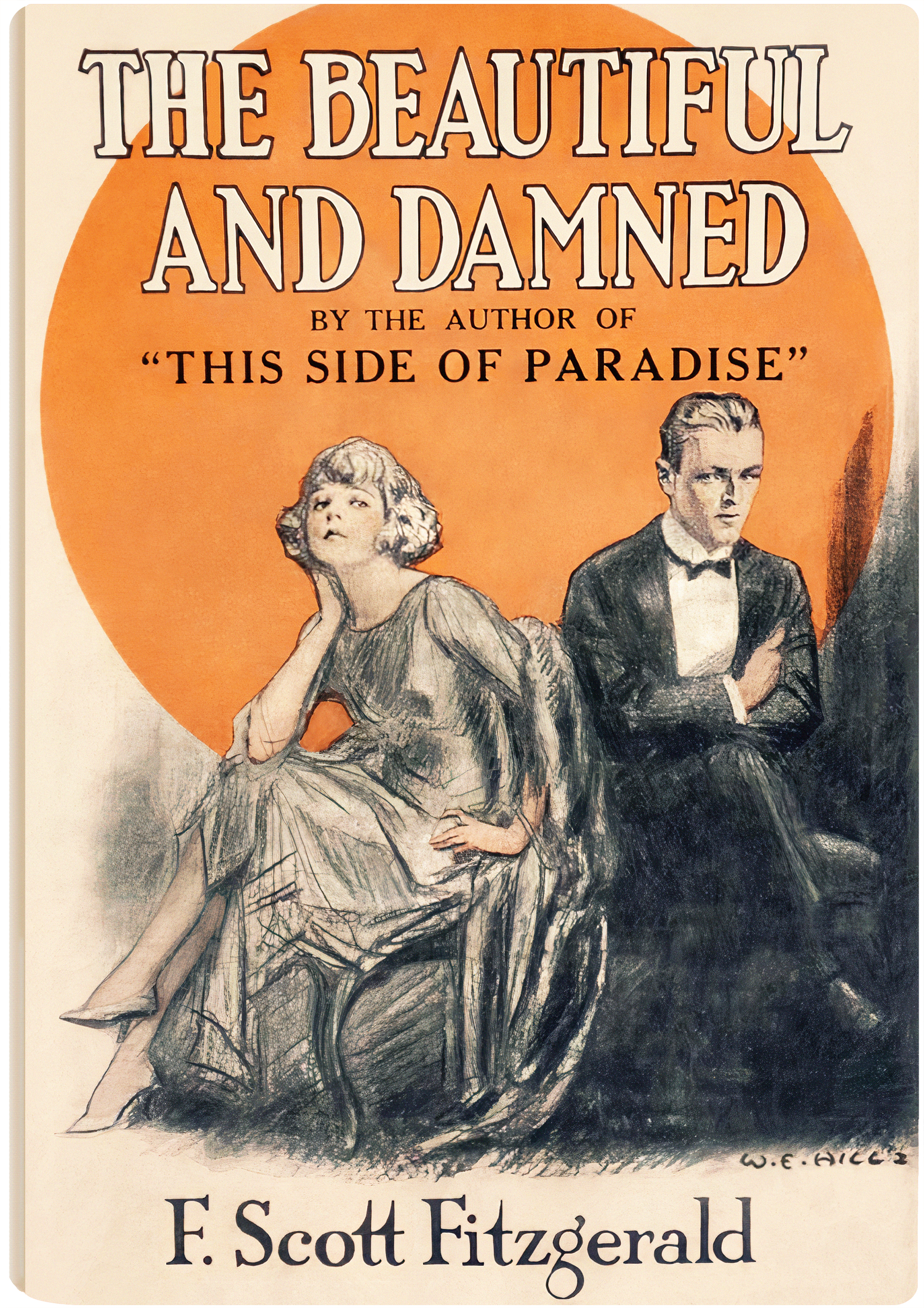
- The cover of the first edition
- Author: F. Scott Fitzgerald
- Cover artist: W. E. Hill
- Language: English
- Genre: Tragedy
- Published: September 1921 to March 1922 (serialized); March 4, 1922 (book form) (Note: Mizener 1951, p. 138 and Gallo 1978, p. 34, list the novel's publication date as March 3rd, whereas Bruccoli 1981, p. 163, and Tate 1998, p. 14, list the publication as March 4th.)
- Publisher: Charles Scribner's Sons
- Publication place: United States
- Media type: Print (hardcover & paperback)
- Preceded by: This Side of Paradise (1920)
- Followed by: The Great Gatsby (1925)
- Text: The Beautiful and Damned at Wikisource

The Beautiful and Damned is a 1922 novel by American writer F. Scott Fitzgerald. Set in New York City, the novel's plot follows a young artist Anthony Comstock Patch and his flapper wife, Gloria Gilbert, who wreck themselves "on the shoals of dissipation" while partying to excess at the dawn of the Jazz Age. As Fitzgerald's sophomore novel, the work focuses on the swinish behavior and glittering excesses of the American idle rich in the mid-1910s heyday of New York's café society.

Fitzgerald loosely modeled the young libertine characters of Anthony Comstock Patch on himself and Gloria Gilbert on his newlywed spouse Zelda Fitzgerald. The novel draws on the early years of Fitzgerald's disappointing marriage in New York City after the meteoric success of the author's first novel, This Side of Paradise. At the time of their wedding in 1920, Fitzgerald claimed neither he nor Zelda loved each other, and the early years of their marriage resembled a friendship.

Mindful of the criticisms leveled at his debut novel This Side of Paradise, Fitzgerald sought in The Beautiful and Damned to improve on the form and structure of his writing and to venture into the different fictional genre of literary realism. His work traces the Hogarthian descent of "lovely young creatures" and "millionaires" into ruin amid the death throes of an old America and the turbulent birth of a new one. In Fitzgerald's view, the "beautiful and damned" of New York's café society were no less fated to destruction than the peasants in Thomas Hardy's bleak novels. He revised his second novel based on suggestions from his friend Edmund Wilson and his editor Max Perkins. When reviewing the revised manuscript, Perkins commended the conspicuous evolution of Fitzgerald's literary craftsmanship.

The novel sold well but received mixed reviews. Metropolitan serialized the work in late 1921, and Scribner's published it in March 1922 in an initial printing of 20,000 copies. Although it did not become a top-ten best-seller, its strong sales led to a second printing of 50,000 copies. Many critics expected more of the carefree gaiety of This Side of Paradise, and the novel's bleak pessimism surprised them. While certain critics lamented that Fitzgerald had traded the bubbly giddiness of This Side of Paradise for "the bitter dregs of reality", others such as John V. A. Weaver and H. L. Mencken praised Fitzgerald's improved craftsmanship and believed he would achieve greatness with his third work. Weaver predicted that, as Fitzgerald matured as a writer, he would come to be regarded as one of the greatest authors in American literature. Later scholars deem the work to be among Fitzgerald's lesser novels.

One month after The Beautiful and Damned's publication, humorist Burton Rascoe suggested that Scott's wife, Zelda, write a satirical newspaper review containing sensational claims as a publicity stunt to boost sales. Although Zelda proofread drafts of her husband's novel and consented to the quotation of her letters in the work, she pretended in her tongue-in-cheek review to read the novel for the first time and jested about plagiarism. As a consequence of Rascoe's mischievous publicity stunt, speculation emerged decades later that Zelda co-authored the novel and collaborated on Fitzgerald's other works. The consensus among Fitzgerald scholars is that no evidence supports these claims.

== Plot summary ==
Things are sweeter when they're lost. I know—because once I wanted something and got it. It was the only thing I ever wanted badly... and when I got it, it turned to dust in my hand.

— F. Scott Fitzgerald, This Beautiful and Damned (1922)

In 1913, Anthony Comstock Patch, a 25-year-old Harvard University alumnus, lives in New York City and spends his days imagining himself as a writer while doing little of substance. Living off an allowance from his dying grandfather while awaiting an inheritance, Anthony drifts through life, encouraged in his idleness by two former Harvard classmates, novelist Richard "Dick" Caramel and aesthete Maury Noble. Dick introduces him to his vivacious cousin, Gloria Gilbert, a beautiful flapper and jazz baby. After a whirlwind courtship, Anthony and Gloria wed, but constant quarrels undermine their marital bliss.

Following a honeymoon in California, Anthony and Gloria settle into a pattern of seasonal retreats between a New York apartment and a country home in Marietta. Pursuing an extravagant lifestyle while dreaming of greater wealth upon his grandfather's death, the couple squanders their money on frivolous luxuries. Their relationship strains as Gloria demands constant acknowledgment of her beauty and Anthony's insecurities lead to a growing dependence on alcohol. They become cynical libertines and, witnessing drunken revelries at their home, Anthony's grandfather visits and leaves in disgust.

After Anthony's grandfather disinherits him for his hedonistic and amoral way of life, the dissolute couple sinks further into financial trouble. Determined to win his full inheritance, Anthony retains a lawyer and embarks on a protracted legal battle to contest his grandfather's new will. As the legal fight drags on for many years, Anthony's employment attempts end in failure, and his drinking spirals out of control. Frustrated by Anthony's irresponsibility and persistent lack of success, Gloria chases the vain dream of becoming the next Mary Pickford and pursues a film career, only to be rejected as too old. As their once-glamorous lifestyle crumbles, Gloria resigns herself to the downward spiral of their marriage.

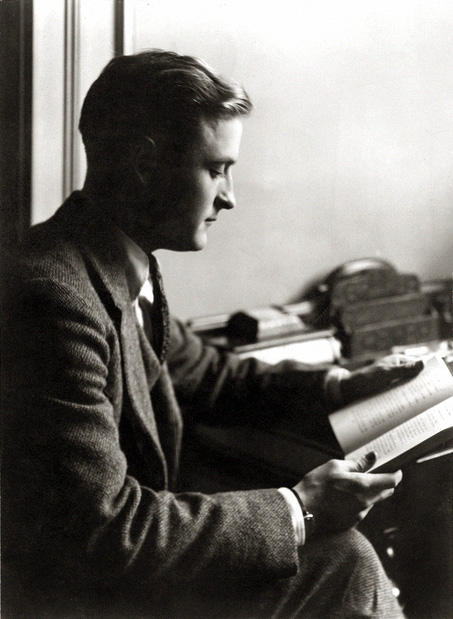
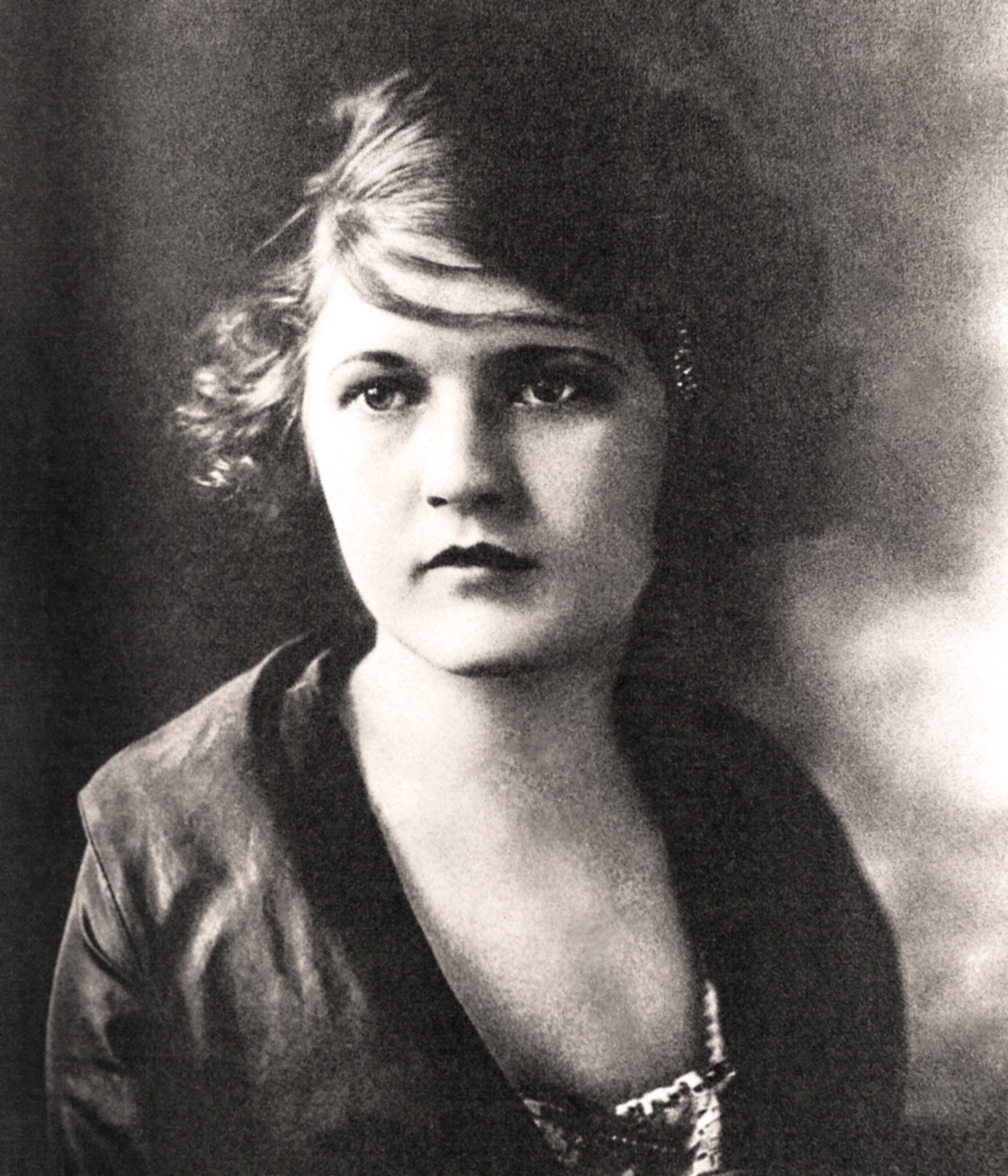
F. Scott Fitzgerald (left) and Zelda Sayre (right) circa 1919–1920. The novel draws on their disappointing marriage.

After the United States enters World War I, Anthony joins the American Expeditionary Force, while Gloria remains home alone until his return. Despising the regimentation of military life, Anthony begins an extramarital liaison with Dot Raycroft, a lower-class Southern woman. Following the Allied Powers' armistice with Imperial Germany in November 1918, Anthony returns to New York City and reunites with Gloria. As the inheritance case continues to drag on, Anthony sinks into hopeless alcoholism, and Gloria's beauty fades.

By 1921, Anthony, Gloria, Richard, and Maury have abandoned their youthful idealism and instead pursue materialistic comforts. After years of legal battles, Anthony wins his inheritance, now worth $30 million dollars (equivalent to $577,037,773 in 2025), but, with his health ruined and his once-vibrant spirit lost, the long-awaited victory proves hollow. Sailing to Europe with an estranged Gloria, Anthony echoes the prejudices of his despised grandfather and views his inherited wealth as a consequence of his character rather than circumstance.

== Major characters ==
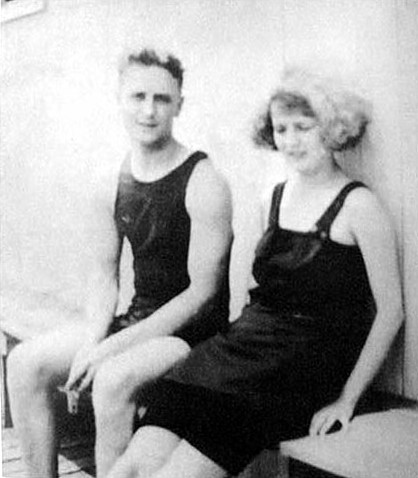
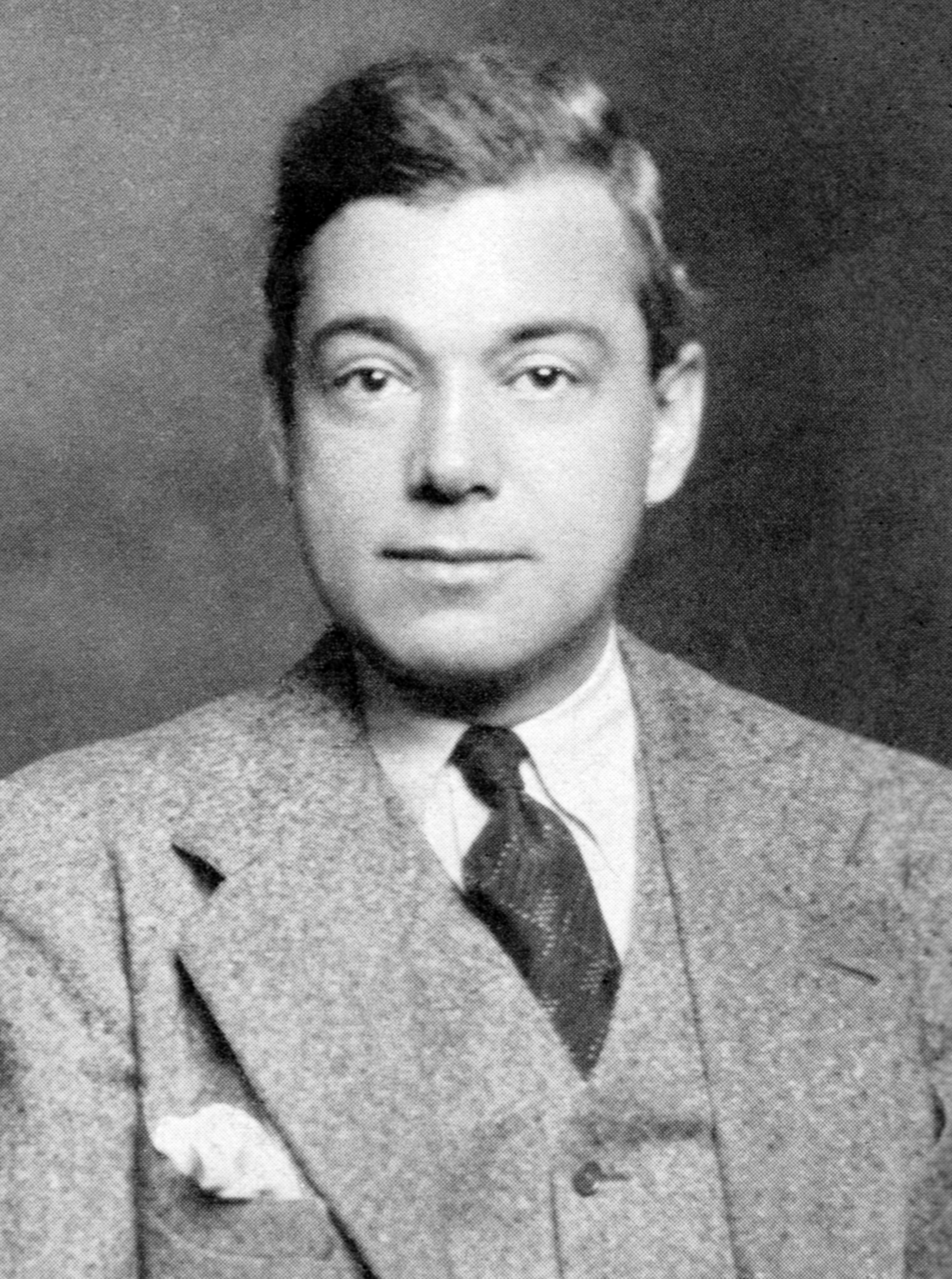
F. Scott Fitzgerald and his wife, Zelda Sayre (pictured at the beach in 1922), inspired the characters of Anthony Patch and Gloria Gilbert. Drama critic George Jean Nathan, who sexually pursued Zelda shortly after her marriage to Fitzgerald, inspired Maury Noble.
- Anthony Comstock Patch – a Harvard alumnus and incorrigible loafer who is an heir to his grandfather's fortune. Unambitious and unmotivated to work, he pursues various careers without success. Upon meeting Gloria Gilbert, he immediately falls in love with her beauty. He is drafted into the United States Army, but the war ends before his overseas deployment. Throughout the novel, he compensates for a lack of vocation with riotous parties and worsening alcoholism. His expectations of future wealth make him powerless to act in the present, leaving him with empty relationships in the end.
- Gloria Patch (née Gilbert) – a beautiful flapper and "jazz baby" from Kansas City whom Anthony marries. She contributes to Anthony's decline through her extravagant spending. Vacuous and self-absorbed, she believes that her beauty makes her more important than everyone else. Fitzgerald loosely based aspects of the character on his wife Zelda. Fitzgerald wrote in a letter that "Gloria was a much more trivial and vulgar person than [Zelda]. I can't really say there was any resemblance except in the beauty and certain terms of expression she used, and also I naturally used many circumstantial events of our early married life."
- Richard "Dick" Caramel – an ambitious author of meager talent who is one of Anthony's best friends and Gloria's cousin. He introduces Anthony to Gloria. After publishing his novel The Demon Lover, he becomes famous. By the novel's end, Caramel believes art to be meaningless, and he becomes an artistic hack whose name is "a byword of contempt."
- Maury Noble – Anthony's cynical best friend and brilliant Harvard classmate whom Fitzgerald describes as possessing "an absurdly catlike face." He snubs Anthony once he becomes impoverished. Fitzgerald primarily based the character on George Jean Nathan, an influential drama critic. From 1914 to 1923, Nathan coedited The Smart Set with H.L. Mencken and, together, they founded The American Mercury in 1924. The Fitzgeralds befriended Nathan as newlyweds while living in New York, and he visited them at their home in Westport, Connecticut, during the summer of 1920. Much to Fitzgerald's irritation, Nathan openly flirted with Zelda and pursued her sexually in front of her husband.
- Joseph Bloeckman – a Jewish film producer who is in love with Gloria and hopes she will leave Anthony for him. Gloria and Bloeckman had a budding relationship when Gloria met Anthony. He continues to be friends with Gloria, giving Anthony some suspicion of an extramarital affair.
- Dorothy "Dot" Raycroft – a lower-class Southern woman with whom Anthony has an affair during his army training. She is a lost soul looking for someone to share her life with. She falls in love with Anthony despite learning that he is married, causing problems between Gloria and Anthony, and spurring the decline of Anthony's mental health.
- Adam Patch – Anthony's wealthy and convalescent grandfather who is a staunch Prohibitionist and moral reformer. A deeply religious man, he despises any form of self-indulgence. He disinherits his profligate grandson after intruding on a bacchanalian party at Anthony's country house in Marietta. Anthony dislikes his grandfather as the old man "represents the old American tradition of hard work and moral righteousness".

== Writing and production ==
=== Background ===
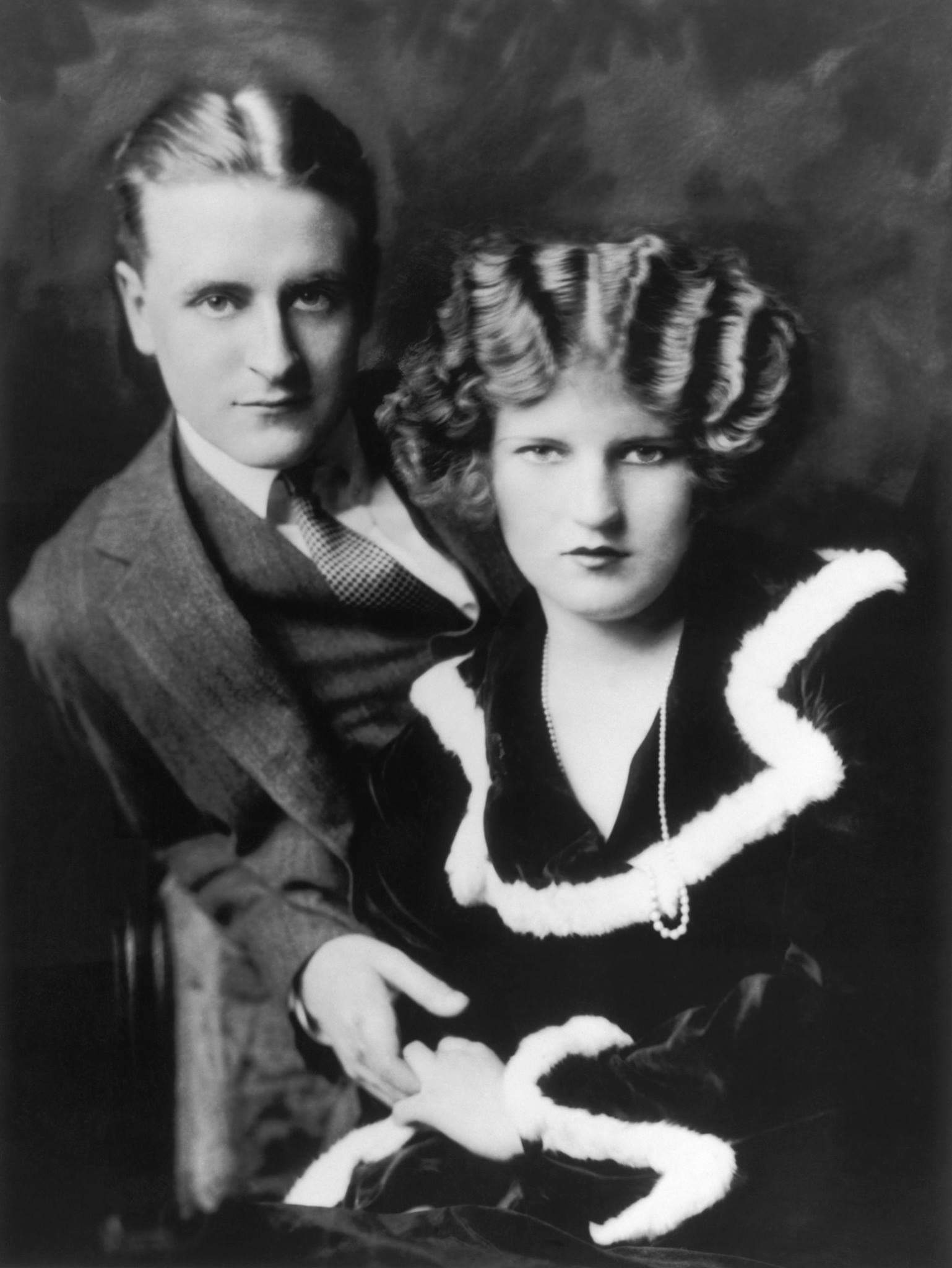
Portrait of Scott and Zelda by Alfred Cheney Johnston, 1923

Following the meteoric success of his debut novel This Side of Paradise in March 1920, F. Scott Fitzgerald became a household name. His new fame enabled him to earn much higher rates for his short stories, and his increased financial prospects persuaded his fiancée Zelda Sayre to marry him as Fitzgerald could now pay for her privileged and affluent lifestyle. At the time, Fitzgerald's feelings for Zelda ebbed to an all-time low, and he told a friend, "I wouldn't care if she died, but I couldn't stand to have anybody else marry her." Despite his reservations, they married in a simple ceremony on April 3, 1920, at St. Patrick's Cathedral in New York City. At the time of their wedding, Fitzgerald claimed neither he nor Zelda still loved each other, and the early years of their disappointing marriage resembled a friendship.

Living in luxury at expensive hotels in New York City, the newlywed couple soon became regarded in the newspapers as the enfants terribles of the Jazz Age due to their wild antics. At the Biltmore Hotel, Scott did handstands in the lobby, while Zelda slid down the hotel banisters. After several weeks, the hotel management evicted them for disturbing other guests. The couple relocated two blocks to the Commodore Hotel on 42nd Street where Zelda spent half-an-hour spinning in the entrance's revolving door. Fitzgerald likened their juvenile escapades in New York City to two children exploring a great bright barn. Writer Dorothy Parker first encountered the couple riding on a taxi's roof. "They did both look as though they had just stepped out of the sun", Parker recalled, "their youth was striking. Everyone wanted to meet him."

Fitzgerald's ephemeral happiness mirrored the feverish gaiety of the Jazz Age, a term that he popularized in his essays and stories. He described the era as racing "along under its own power, served by great filling stations full of money." In Fitzgerald's eyes, the era represented a morally permissive time when Americans became disillusioned with prevailing social norms and obsessed with self-gratification. During this hedonistic era, drinking bootleg gin fueled the Fitzgeralds' social life, and they consumed gin-and-fruit concoctions at every outing. Publicly, their alcohol intake meant little more than napping at parties; privately, it led to bitter quarrels. As their quarrels worsened, the couple accused each other of marital infidelities. They confided to friends that their marriage would not last much longer.

=== Composition ===
After relocating from New York City to Westport, Connecticut, in May 1920, Fitzgerald began work on his second novel in August. For inspiration, he turned to the works of Theodore Dreiser and Frank Norris, the author of the novels McTeague and Vandover and the Brute. The latter 1914 novel, Vandover and the Brute, concerning the downfall of a gifted Harvard alumnus who becomes a vagrant, particularly influenced Fitzgerald's early conception of the character arc for his protagonist Anthony Patch. His tentative titles for his second novel included The Beautiful Lady Without Mercy and The Flight of the Rocket.

Mindful of criticisms of This Side of Paradise, Fitzgerald sought to improve on the form and construction of his prose and to venture into the new genre of literary realism. His work traces the Hogarthian descent of "lovely young creatures" and "millionaires" into ruin amid the death throes of an old America and the turbulent birth of a new one. In Fitzgerald's view, the "beautiful and damned" of New York's cafe society were as ill-fated as the peasants in Thomas Hardy's gloomy novels. On August 12, Fitzgerald described the novel's plot to publisher Charles Scribner II as focusing on the life of an artist who lacks creative inspiration and who, after marrying a beautiful woman, wrecks himself "on the shoals of dissipation".

Mirroring the novel's plot, excessive partying interrupted the composition of Fitzgerald's second novel. In one instance, during a wild party at their Westport residence, an unknown guest pulled the fire alarm as a prank. When the firemen arrived and demanded to know the location of the fire, Zelda pointed at her breasts and declared: "Here!" During this same period, Zelda's father, Judge Anthony D. Sayre, unexpectedly visited Westport. As a white supremacist and former Southern legislator, Sayre masterminded Alabama's Jim Crow laws, and his uncle John T. Morgan previously reigned as the Grand Dragon of Alabama's Ku Klux Klan. A staunch Prohibitionist, Judge Sayre disapproved of Scott and Zelda's hedonistic lifestyle. His visit may have inspired the scene in which Anthony’s grandfather arrives unexpectedly during a riotous party.

Zelda's homesickness for the Jim Crow South next interrupted Fitzgerald's writing. Zelda insisted to her husband that they must return to the South as she wanted peaches and biscuits for breakfast. After an overland excursion by motor car to Montgomery, Alabama, the couple returned to Westport where Fitzgerald resumed work on his novel. Zelda became pregnant in February 1921. Friction between Zelda and Scott regarding the South resurfaced during Zelda's pregnancy. As a fervent neo-Confederate, Zelda demanded that the child be born on Southern soil in Jim Crow Alabama, but Fitzgerald refused. Zelda wrote to a friend: "Scott's changed... He used... to say he loved the South, but now he wants to get as far away from it as he can." To Zelda's dismay, her husband insisted on having their baby on northern soil in St. Paul, Minnesota.

=== Revisions ===
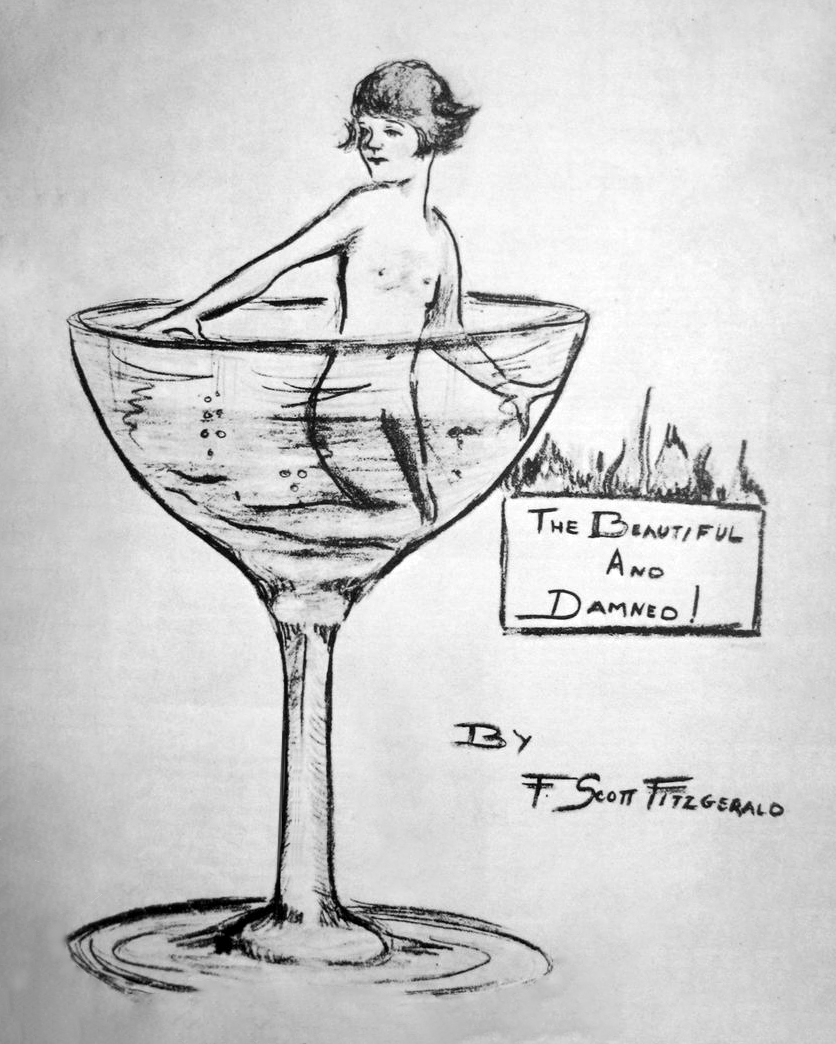
Zelda's sketch envisioning the novel's cover. The publisher instead used an illustration by W. E. Hill.

Throughout the winter and spring of 1921–22, Fitzgerald rewrote various drafts of The Beautiful and Damned. He modeled loosely the spoiled characters of Anthony Patch on himself and Gloria Patch on—in his words—the chill-minded selfishness of his helplessly privileged Southern wife. During her idle youth, Zelda's wealthy Southern family employed domestic servants, predominantly African-American. Accustomed to these black servants catering to and fulfilling her every need, Zelda showed little competence in managing ordinary responsibilities, from money matters to daily tasks.

Fitzgerald drew on the early years of his disappointing marriage after the meteoric success of the author's first novel This Side of Paradise. He divided the manuscript into three major parts: "The Pleasant Absurdity of Things", "The Romantic Bitterness of Things", and "The Ironic Tragedy of Things". In final form, the novel consists of untitled "books" of three chapters each.

Fitzgerald revised The Beautiful and Damned based on suggestions from his friend Edmund Wilson and his editor Max Perkins. While reviewing the manuscript, Perkins praised the development of Fitzgerald's literary skill. Fitzgerald dedicated the novel to the Anglo-Irish writer Shane Leslie, drama critic George Jean Nathan, and his editor Max Perkins in appreciation of their guidance and encouragement.

While finalizing the novel, Fitzgerald traveled to Europe with his wife, and his agent Harold Ober sold the novel's serialization rights to Metropolitan magazine for $7,000. Metropolitan serialized the chapters from September 1921 to March 1922. Shortly before the novel's publication in book form by Charles Scribner's Sons, Zelda Fitzgerald made a sketch for the dust jacket of her husband's novel depicting a naked flapper sitting in a cocktail glass, but the publisher instead used an illustration by W. E. Hill. On March 4, 1922, Scribner's published the book with an initial print run of approximately 20,000 copies, and The Beautiful and Damned sold well enough to warrant additional print runs reaching 50,000 copies.

== Critical reception ==
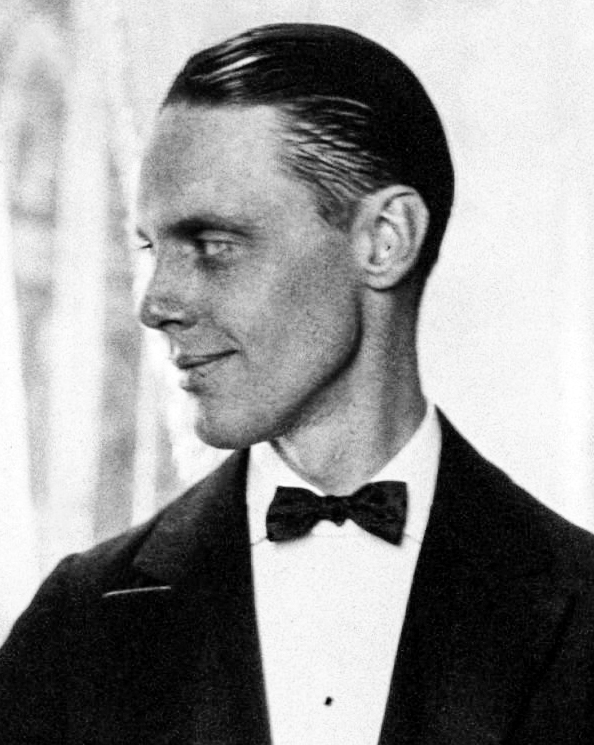
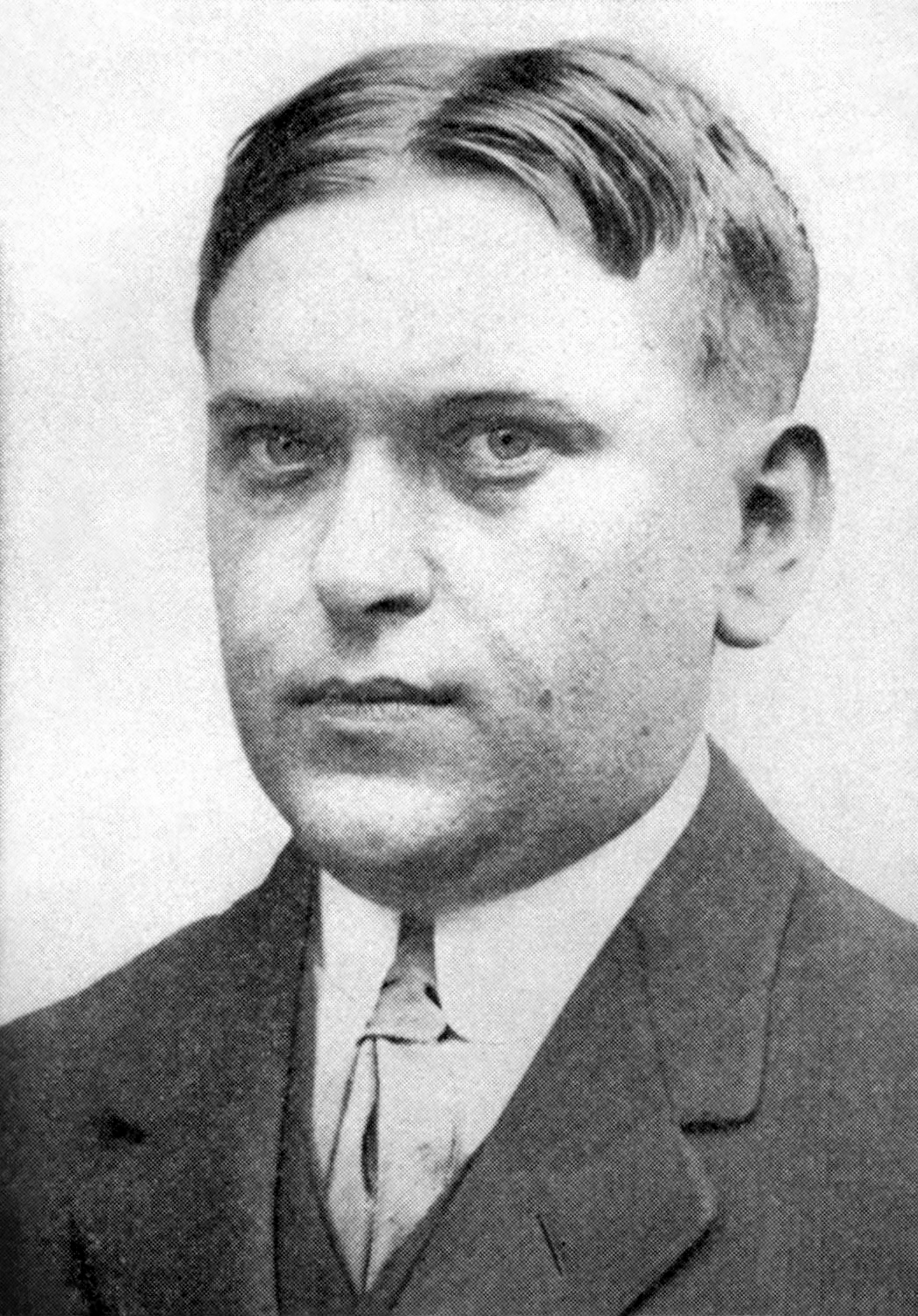
Critics John V. A. Weaver (left) and H. L. Mencken (right) praised The Beautiful and Damned. Weaver predicted that Fitzgerald would become one of the greatest authors of American literature.

There is a profounder truth in The Beautiful and Damned than the author perhaps intended to convey: the hero and heroine are strange creatures without purpose or method, who give themselves up to wild debaucheries and do not, from beginning to end perform a single serious act; but you somehow get the impression that, in spite of their madness, they are the most rational people in the book.... The inference is that, in such a civilization, the sanest and most creditable thing is to forget organized society and live for the jazz of the moment.

— Edmund Wilson, Literary Spotlight, 1924

The novel's critical response proved mixed. As Fitzgerald discarded the trappings of collegiate bildungsromans as epitomized in his debut work and crafted an "ironical-pessimistic" [sic] novel in the style of Thomas Hardy's literary realism, the bleak pessimism of his second novel surprised critics who expected more of the carefree gaiety of This Side of Paradise. Critic Louise Field of The New York Times asserted that The Beautiful and Damned showed Fitzgerald to be talented but too pessimistic. Fanny Butcher—who hailed the author's debut novel as a "flaming skyrocket"—likewise lamented that Fitzgerald had traded the bubbly giddiness of This Side of Paradise for "the bitter dregs of reality."

With his sophomore effort's publication, more perceptive critics discerned an evolution in the craftmanship of Fitzgerald's prose and structure. Whereas This Side of Paradise featured unrefined prose and a chaotic structure, The Beautiful and Damned displayed a superior form as well as an awakened literary consciousness. Paul Rosenfeld commented that certain passages in Fitzgerald's second novel rivaled D. H. Lawrence in their artistry. Remarking on these improvements, H. L. Mencken wrote in his The Smart Set review, "There are a hundred signs in it of serious purpose and unquestionable skill. Even in its defects there is proof of hard striving. Fitzgerald ceases to be a wunderkind, and begins to come into his maturity".

While certain critics commended the improvement in prose and structure over This Side of Paradise, others deemed The Beautiful and Damned to be less ground-breaking. In contrast to the praise for This Side of Paradise as pulsing with originality, Fanny Butcher deemed The Beautiful and Damned to be a more conventional effort. Butcher feared that "Fitzgerald had a brilliant future ahead of him in 1920" but, "unless he does something better... it will be behind him in 1923."

In contrast to Butcher's disappointment, critics H. L. Mencken and John V. A. Weaver recognized that the vast improvement in literary form and construction between Fitzgerald's first and second novels augured great prospects for his future. Mencken expected that Fitzgerald would significantly improve with his third work, and Weaver predicted that, as Fitzgerald matured into a better writer, he would become regarded as one of the greatest authors of American literature.

Over a century later, many Fitzgerald scholars typically consider The Beautiful and Damned to be among the author's weaker novels. During the final decade of his life, Fitzgerald concurred about the novel's lackluster quality in a letter to his wife Zelda: "I wish The Beautiful and Damned had been a maturely written book because it was all true. We ruined ourselves—I have never honestly thought that we ruined each other."

== Publicity stunt ==
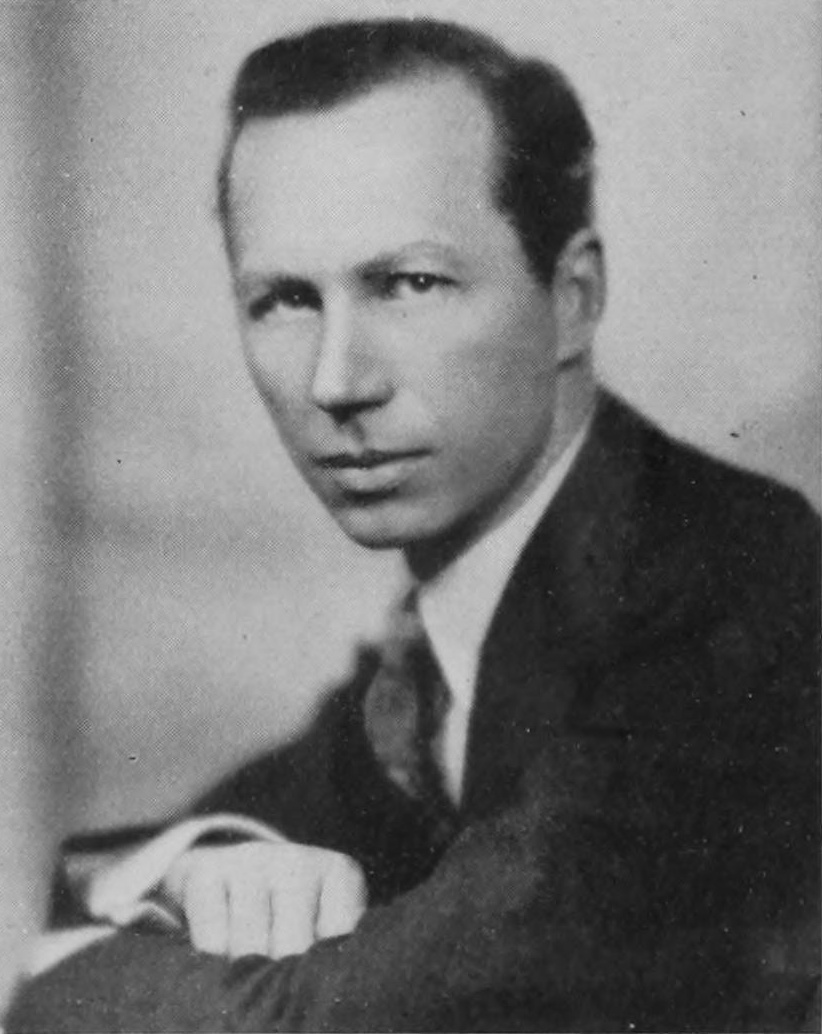
Humorist Burton Rascoe

In April 1922, one month after The Beautiful and Damned's publication, Scott's friend, humorist Burton Rascoe, suggested that his wife Zelda Fitzgerald should write a satirical review of the book for The New-York Tribune as a publicity stunt. Although Zelda had carefully proofread drafts of her husband's novel, Rascoe instructed Zelda to pretend in her tongue-in-cheek review to read the novel for the very first time and to deliberately invent a sensationalistic "rub here and there" to provoke controversy and boost sales.

Per Rascoe's instructions, Zelda made a series of sensationalistic claims in a satirical newspaper review titled "Friend Husband's Latest". In the persona of Scott's "greedy and self-centered" spouse, Zelda wrote that she hoped her husband's novel would become a commercial success as "there is the cutest cloth of gold dress for only $300 in a store on Forty-second Street". In the same satirical review, Zelda partly jested—that "on one page I recognized a portion of an old diary of mine... and, also, scraps of letters which, though considerably edited, sound to me vaguely familiar. In fact, Mr. Fitzgerald—I believe that is how he spells his name—seems to believe that plagiarism begins at home." Contrary to this feigned pretense in her satirical review, Zelda had been aware in advance of these quotations as a proofreader, and Scott had obtained her permission to use them.

As a consequence of Rascoe's mischievous publicity stunt, discredited speculation emerged many decades after Zelda's death that she co-authored The Beautiful and Damned and collaborated on Scott's other works. The consensus among Fitzgerald scholars is that no evidence supports these claims, and Zelda herself never made any such claims. Although Fitzgerald quoted a single page of Zelda's diary and letter snippets with her permission, scholar Matthew J. Bruccoli states that "none of Fitzgerald's surviving manuscripts shows her hand.... She was never his collaborator." "Fitzgerald did use bits of her diary and letters," scholar Mary Jo Tate concurs, "but she was not his collaborator." Despite Zelda giving her permission for such quotes, proofreading drafts, and Fitzgerald crediting her in the press, myths persist that Fitzgerald plagiarized his wife.

== Critical analysis ==
Critics have analyzed The Beautiful and Damned as a morality tale of beautiful young people whose lives disintegrate from the corrosive forces of an emerging, hyper-materialistic, new America epitomized by the hedonistic Jazz Age. Such analyses often focus on the characters' disproportionate absorption with their past—a fixation that tends to consume them in the present. The theme of absorption in the past continues through much of Fitzgerald's subsequent works, perhaps best summarized in the final line of his 1925 novel The Great Gatsby: "So we beat on, boats against the current, borne back ceaselessly into the past", which is inscribed on Fitzgerald's tombstone in Maryland.

Many critics argue that Fitzgerald's sophomore novel represents a significant technical improvement over his debut work. Alfred Kazin wrote that "critics were eager to note every improvement in style, every sign of developing maturity, from This Side of Paradise to The Beautiful and Damned." Yet, although "technically superior" in its tripartite structure to This Side of Paradise, the work ranks as his least successful and weakest novel.

Critics cite the work's intellectual pretensions as its key flaw. Stung by earlier criticisms about the intellectual vacuity of his debut novel, Fitzgerald sought "to prove in his second novel that he was a thinker." "Mistaking prolixity for richness and depth," he encumbered The Beautiful and Damned "with a welter of ideas that are announced rather than developed." Arthur Mizener, Fitzgerald's first biographer, observed the author's "tendency to substitute lectures for dialogue" manifests in a monologue by Maury Noble that seems "like a resume of The Education of Henry Adams filtered through a particularly thick page of The Smart Set." Rose Adrienne Gallo concurs that the novel's "mistakes are those of the fledgling novelist eager to impress his readers. The youthful effusions must be pitted against the novel's unquestionable verve and brilliant evocation of its period."

According to scholar James L. W. West III, The Beautiful and Damned focuses on the question of 'vocation': 'What does one do with oneself when one has nothing to do?' According to West, "Fitzgerald applied the question of vocation largely to his male characters, but he saw that women too needed meaningful roles in life." Fitzgerald presents Gloria as a woman whose vocation is nothing more than to catch a husband. After their marriage, Gloria's sole vocation is to slide into indolence, while her husband's sole vocation is to wait for his inheritance as he slides into alcoholism.

== Adaptations ==
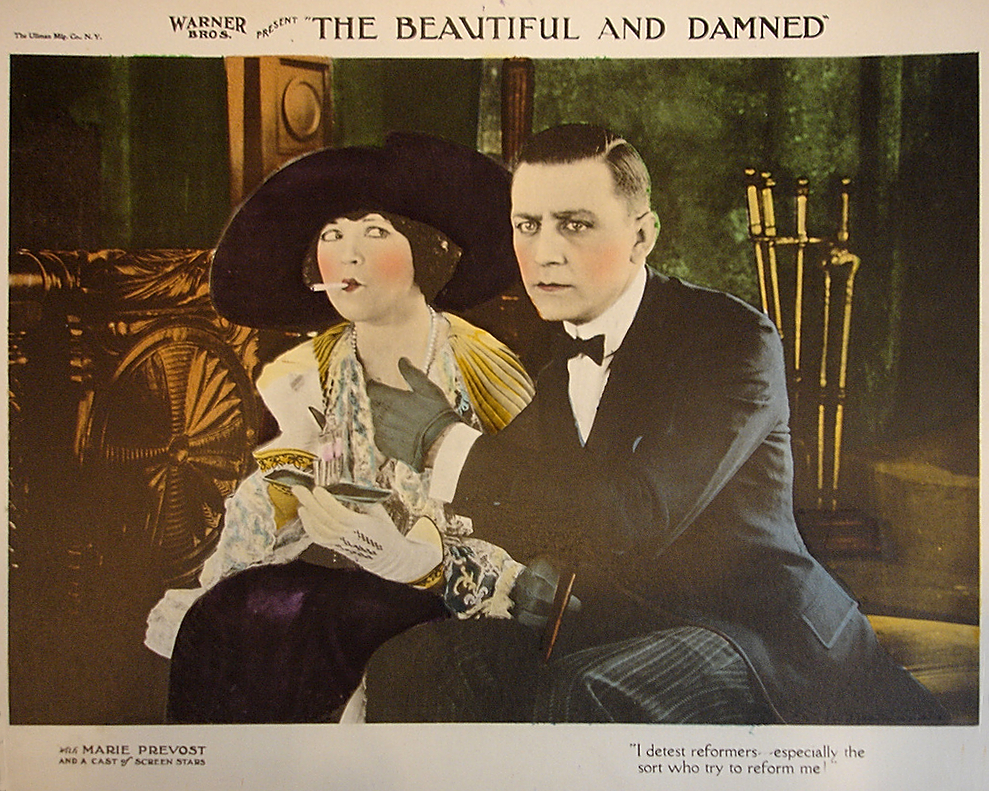
Lobby card for the lost 1922 film adaptation

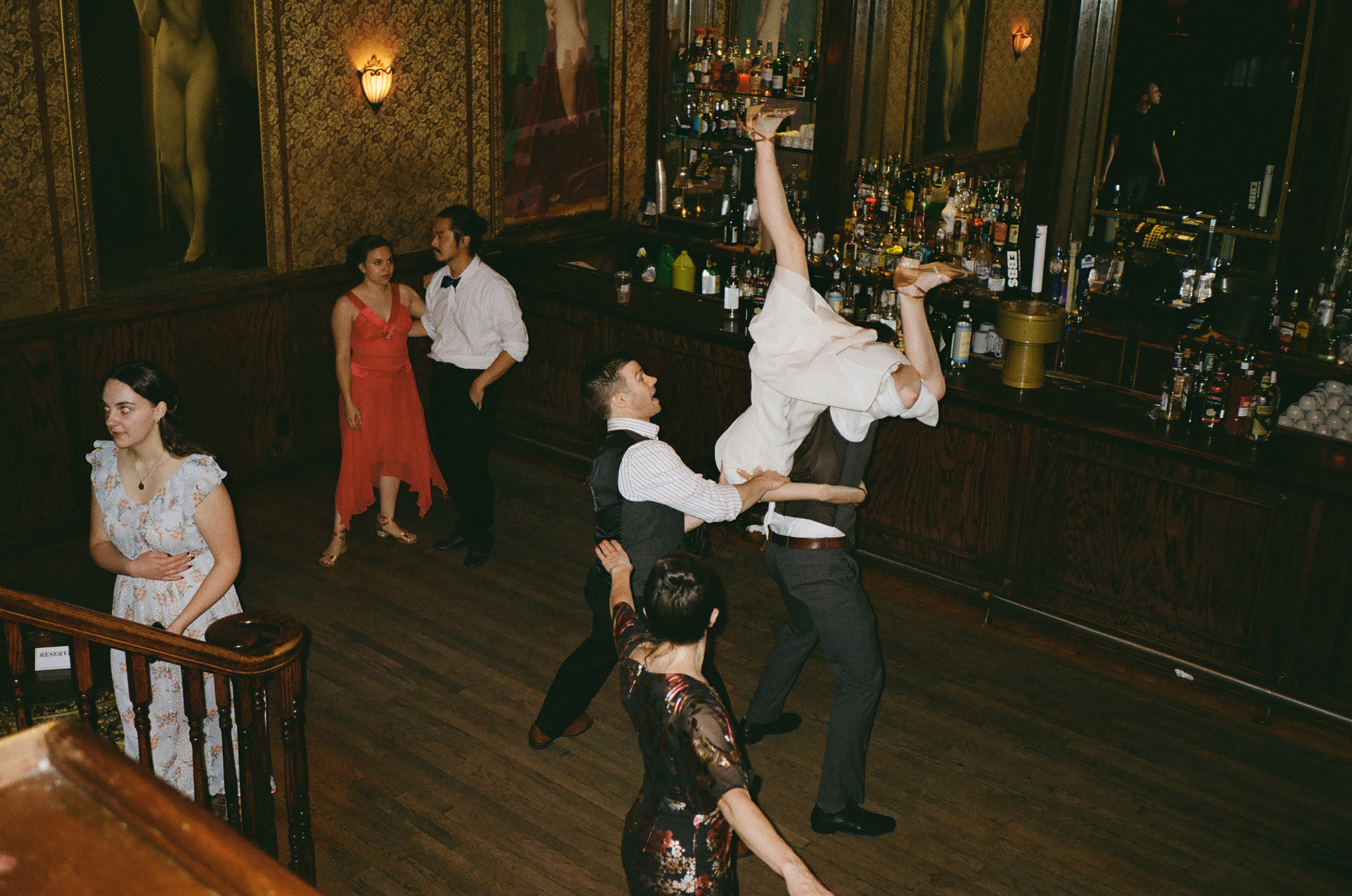
Cast members during a June 2025 performance of The Broken Lute.

The Beautiful and Damned has inspired multiple adaptations across different forms of media. Shortly after the work's publication, Fitzgerald sold the film rights to Warner Bros. for $2,250 (equivalent to $43,278 in 2025). The studio released a film adaptation in November 1922. Directed by William A. Seiter, the silent film starred Kenneth Harlan as Anthony Patch and Marie Prevost as Gloria.

The 1922 silent film performed well at the box office and received generally favorable critical reviews. F. Scott Fitzgerald disliked the film, and he wrote to a friend: "It's by far the worst movie I've ever seen in my life—cheap, vulgar, ill-constructed and shoddy. We were utterly ashamed of it." No surviving reels of The Beautiful and Damned exist, and the film is considered lost.

In 2025, an immersive play titled The Broken Lute premiered, written and directed by Brooke DiSpirito. The cast featured Henry Lynch as Anthony Patch, Izzy Ochocki as Gloria, Devon Lawler as Dick Caramel, and Dan Caprera as Frederick Paramore. The production debuted during the F. Scott Fitzgerald Society’s 17th International Conference in New York City on June 24, 2025, followed by an encore performance on August 12, 2025. A traditional speakeasy, The Back Room, served as the setting for a final, wild bacchanalia at the Patch Residence. The play traced the collapse of Anthony and Gloria’s relationship and depicted Anthony’s disinheritance at the hands of his grandfather, while integrating a live band, dance performances, and interactive scenes involving the audience.
