= The Responsibilities of the Novelist =

1903 writing guide by Frank Norris

The Responsibilities of the Novelist: And other literary essays
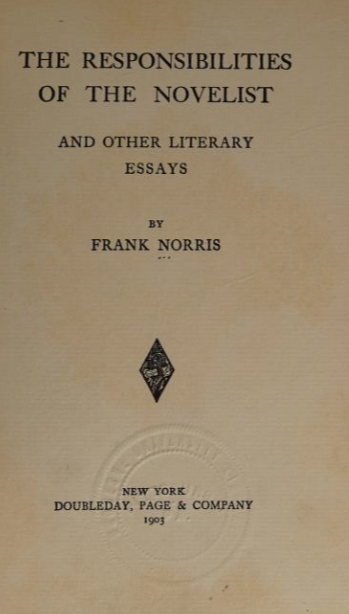
- Title page for The Responsibilities of the Novelist (1903)
- Authors: Frank Norris
- Language: English
- Genre: non-fiction
- Publication date: 1903

The Responsibilities of the Novelist: And other literary essays is a 1903 non-fiction book by Frank Norris. It was published posthumously, and it includes essays that Norris published in literary reviews about the art of novel-writing.

A 1903 review in The Los Angeles Times described the book as "original, sincere, admirable as a whole" but "defective in its own literary art" and lacking "authority."
