= A Man's Woman =

1900 novel by Frank Norris

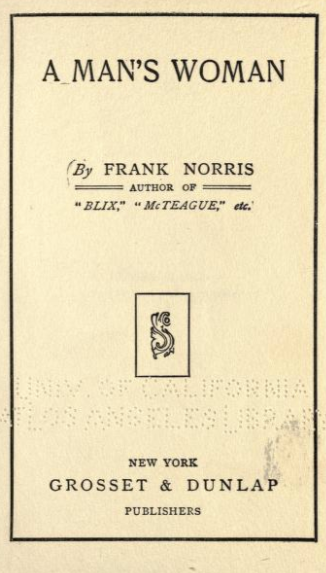
- Title page for A Man's Woman (1900)
- Author: Frank Norris
- Language: English
- Genre: Novel
- Publisher: Doubleday & McClure Company
- Publication date: 1900
- Publication place: United States
- Pages: 286

A Man's Woman is an adventure novel by Frank Norris, published in 1900. It is a story that primarily follows two characters, Ward Bennett and Lloyd Searight, and the unlikely love that blossoms between them. It is one of three romantic novels by this author who typically wrote about more serious topics.

== Author's note ==
In a note regarding the book's title, Norris writes:

The following novel was completed March 22, 1899, and sent to the printer in October of the same year. After the plates had been made notice was received that a play called A Man's Woman had been written by Anne Crawford Flexner, and that this title had been copyrighted. As it was impossible to change the name of the novel at the time this notice was received, it has been published under the original title.

The book is dedicated to Dr. Albert J. Houston, Norris's close friend and former college classmate.

== Synopsis ==
The story opens with Ward Bennett, an explorer of extraordinary will, and his men attempting to reach the North Pole, enduring brutal hardships. Many of the men die slow, painful deaths, and they all would have been killed if a boat had not stumbled across them. However, when they return home, Bennett and his surviving men are greeted with a hero's welcome.

The novel shifts to Lloyd Searight, a young and attractive woman, who works as a nurse despite being independently wealthy. The reader discovers that Lloyd and Bennett have mutual feelings for each other, but neither one has ever expressed these feelings.

Ferriss, Bennett's closest friend, contracts typhoid fever, and Lloyd is nursing him. Fearing that she will contract the disease, Bennett refuses to let Lloyd come near Ferriss, and as a result, Ferriss dies. Lloyd refuses to speak to Bennett, and they both enter into a time of deep despair. However, when Bennett comes down with the same disease, Lloyd is forced to nurse him, and they eventually reconcile and marry. Lloyd gives up nursing, Bennett gives up exploring, and they live in the country together while Bennett works on a book, both for a while very happy with their situation. However, after talking with Bennet's man Alder, who does work around the house, Lloyd realizes that it is Bennett's calling, his duty to America, to lead the first expedition to the North Pole. The book ends with his leaving while Lloyd proudly watches him go.

== Characters ==
1. Bennett — An arctic explorer, the main character of the book. He is described as having almost a super-human drive and super-human strength. Bennett is a brute of a man, the perfect type to lead an arctic exploration, which he does, once at the beginning of the book, and again at its end. In the middle, he becomes the husband of Lloyd.
2. Lloyd — Second-most prominent figure in the novel. Lloyd is a nurse, who, unknown to her colleagues, is independently wealthy. She is also extremely strong-willed, and she is an excellent nurse. She never meets anyone who can match her will until she meets Bennett. Ends up as his wife.
3. Ferriss — Bennett's second in command on his first attempt to reach the North Pole as well as his closest friend. Bennett has a great respect for Ferriss, but in the end he indirectly causes his death.
4. Alder — One of Bennett's men, a weak individual who follows orders well. He worships Bennett, and he is heartbroken at the idea that he may not make another trip to the North Pole because of his marriage to Lloyd. Does housework for Bennett when they are not traveling.
5. Dr. Pitts — The town doctor. Lloyd often assists him with his patients.
6. Hattie Campbell — Little girl who receives a hip operation. Lloyd helps with this operation, and it shows the reader her abilities and talents as a nurse.
7. Duane — Englishman who makes an attempt at the North Pole, after Bennett’s first trip. His attempt is a failure.
8. Tremlidge, Garlock, and Campbell — The three men who plead with Bennett to make a return trip to the north. They want the trip to be made by and American and offer to finance a voyage by Bennett.
9. Hansen, Clark, Dennison, and Muck Tu — All members of Bennett’s crew who do not die in the north. They play minor roles in role in the novel.

== Themes ==
The novel's main theme, in the view of literary critic Warren French, is the relationship between the sexes, and the proclaimed superiority of men over women. One example occurs when Bennett prevents Lloyd from taking care of Ferriss. Lloyd is a modern working woman, wealthy and described as very strong willed. And yet, in the end, her will breaks down, she gives into Bennett, thus contributing to Ferriss's death. According to French, Norris is not just commenting on men's superiority over women, but to a degree over nature and disease also. Bennett, the embodiment of manhood in this novel, is able to conquer everything in the world, with one exception – himself.

== Critical reception ==
Don Graham, in Critical Essays on Frank Norris, quotes an unnamed critic, who points out that there is "not a passage in the book that is pleasant to read". As well as Bennett's brutal struggles in the frozen north, and Lloyd’s job as a nurse taking care of dying people, this same critic describes some of the passages in the book as "wearisome" and "rambling". In addition, he or she takes offense at the title of the novel, and says that Bennett is not the image of modern manliness, but that he is little better than an ape, between his appearance and his demeanor.

In his study of Norris, Warren French was generally very critical of A Man's Woman, saying it has "all the usual Norris touches—formless fears of self indulgence, a puritanical repression of feelings, and contempt for 'inferior races'."

A reviewer from The Critic said of Lloyd that she was "as far from any ideal of a man's woman heretofore presented as the east is from the west." She was not a terribly well received heroine, and the book as a whole was not well received by its critics. Many believe Norris already had his mind on his next novel while he was still writing this one, and that it shows.
