= The Beautiful and Damned (film) =

1922 film by William A. Seiter

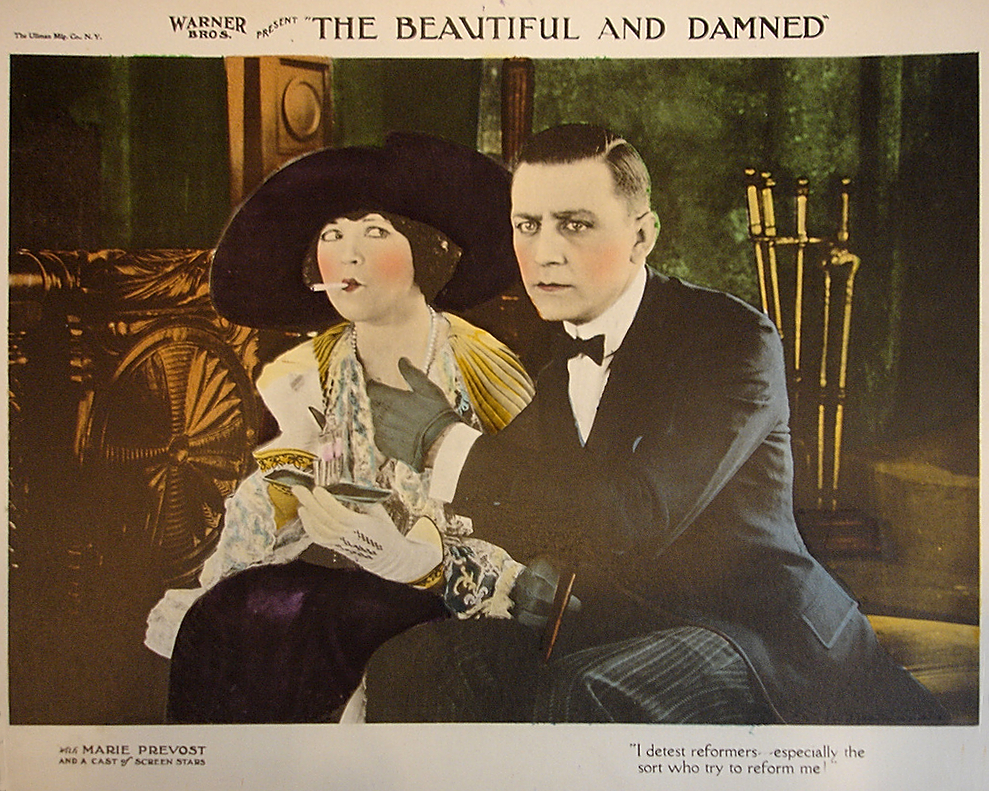
- Lobby card
- Directed by: William A. Seiter
- Written by: Olga Printzlau
- Based on: The Beautiful and Damned by F. Scott Fitzgerald
- Starring: Kenneth Harlan; Marie Prevost
- Production company: Warner Bros.
- Distributed by: Warner Bros.
- Release date: January 1, 1923 (US)
- Running time: 70 minutes
- Country: United States
- Language: Silent (English intertitles)
- Budget: $108,000
- Box office: $349,000

The Beautiful and Damned is a 1922 American silent drama film directed by William A. Seiter and released by Warner Bros. The film, based on F. Scott Fitzgerald's 1922 novel of the same name, starred Kenneth Harlan and Marie Prevost.

== Cast ==
- Marie Prevost as Gloria
- Kenneth Harlan as Anthony
- Harry Myers as Dick
- Tully Marshall as Adam Patch
- Louise Fazenda as Muriel
- Cleo Ridgely as Dot
- Emmett King as Mr. Gilbert
- Walter Long as Hull
- Clarence Burton as Bloeckman
- J. Parker McConnell as Maury
- Charles McHugh as Shuttleworth
- Kathleen Key as Rachel
- George Kuwa as Tanner

== Production ==
To publicize the film, Jack L. Warner, announced that the film's stars, Kenneth Harlan and Marie Prevost, would marry on the film's set. The publicity stunt worked and thousands of fans sent gifts and letters to the couple. However, Warner was unaware that Prevost was still secretly married to her first husband, Sonny Gerke. The Los Angeles Mirror got wind of Prevost's first marriage and ran a story with the headline "Marie Prevost Will Be a Bigamist if She Marries Kenneth Harlan". Warner was livid over the negative publicity and Prevost's failure to disclose her first marriage despite the fact that the publicity stunt was his idea. Warner quickly arranged an annulment, and when the publicity surrounding the scandal died down, Prevost and Harlan quietly married.

== Reception ==
The film was a success at the box office and critical reviews were generally favorable. According to Warner Bros. records the film earned $327,000 domestically and $22,000 from foreign markets.

Author F. Scott Fitzgerald, however, disliked the film. He later wrote to a friend "It's by far the worst movie I've ever seen in my life-cheap, vulgar, ill-constructed and shoddy. We were utterly ashamed of it."

== Preservation status ==
The film is currently listed as a lost film, and no copies of The Beautiful and Damned are known to exist. Warner Bros. records of the film's negative have a notation, "Junked 12/27/48" (i.e., December 27, 1948). Warner Bros. destroyed many of its pre-1933 nitrate film negatives in the late 1940s and 1950s due to their decomposition.
