= The Third Circle =

1909 book published posthumously

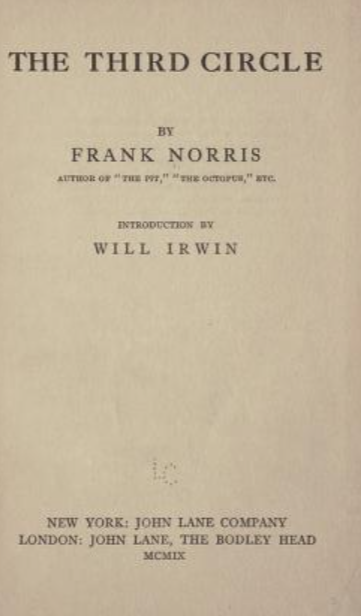
- Title page for The Third Circle (1909)
- Authors: Frank Norris
- Language: English
- Genre: fiction
- Publication date: 1909

The Third Circle is a collection of short stories by Frank Norris with an introduction by William Henry Irwin. It was published posthumously in 1909.

== Summary ==
The collection contains 16 short stories. In then, Norris depicts life in San Francisco, California before the 1906 earthquake, especially the "terrible conditions" in Chinatown.

== Critical reception ==
The Spectator called it "a series of remarkable sketches and short stories... they are especially interesting as showing the growth of his talent, but they are well worth reading for their intrinsic merit."

The Sewanee Review noted "There are sixteen sketches in all and each is entitled to the place given it upon its particular merits rather than, as was the evident intention of the editor, of exhibiting therein the growth and development of the author's imagination and technique."
