= Damnation (Ride the Madness) =

Studio album by Eva O
- Released: September 13, 1999
- Recorded: 1999
- Genre: Deathrock; Gothic rock Dark Wave
- Label: Massacre Records
- Producer: Eric Clayton

Eva O chronology
Demons Fall for an Angel's Kiss (1994)	Damnation (Ride the Madness) (1999)	Damnation/Salvation (2005)

Damnation (Ride the Madness) is the 1999 studio solo album of the American deathrock veteran musician Eva O, released on the German label Massacre Records. The album was announced as the first half of a two album set, but the sequel, to be titled Salvation (Are You Ready to Die?), was not released. Her 2005 album Damnation/Salvation includes rerecorded versions of songs from this album along with the Salvation (Are You Ready to Die?) songs.

== Overview ==
The album deals with Eva's past in the occult world and spiritual struggles. "Damnation & Damnation II" begins with a sample depicting the four riders of the apocalypse approaching, creating an oppressive, hopeless atmosphere that characterizes the album. Common theme is Eva's struggle against hypocrisy and her existential journey between heaven and hell, a constant subject since her days as companion of now deceased Rozz Williams. The album's overall sound is dominated by her twisted vocals, harsh guitars, industrial beats, and apocalyptic folk guitar parts. Eva O criticizes Christian fundamentalists, stares into the eye of hell and preaches Crowleyan principles, all seeming as a kind of desperate mantra to exorcise her inner demons. The music is dramatic in the electro gothic tradition, laden with synthesizer strings and stately male backing vocals.

Despite the fact Eva O was a Christian at the time of the album's production and release, Massacre Records considered the album too intense for Christian bookshops.

== Track listing ==
1. "Damnation & Damnation II"
2. "Damnation (part 2)"
3. "One By One"
4. "Blood Lust"
5. "Panting For Love"
6. "Beauty of Hell"
7. "Ride the Madness"
8. "The Devil"
9. "Complete Hell"
10. "Stand Before The Light"
