= Damm, Parchim =

Damm
- Ortsteil of Parchim
- Interactive map of Damm
- Location within Germany Location within Mecklenburg-Vorpommern
- Coordinates: 53°26′22″N 11°45′18″E
- Country: Germany
- State: Mecklenburg-Vorpommern
- District: Ludwigslust-Parchim
- Town: Parchim

Area
  - Total: 17.88 km^{2} (6.90 sq mi)
- Elevation: 42 m (138 ft)

Population (2012-12-31)
  - Total: 500
  - Density: 28/km^{2} (72/sq mi)
- Time zone: UTC+01:00 (CET)
  - Summer (DST): UTC+02:00 (CEST)
- Postal codes: 19374
- Dialling codes: 03863, 03871
- Vehicle registration: PCH
- Website: www.amt-parchimer-umland.de

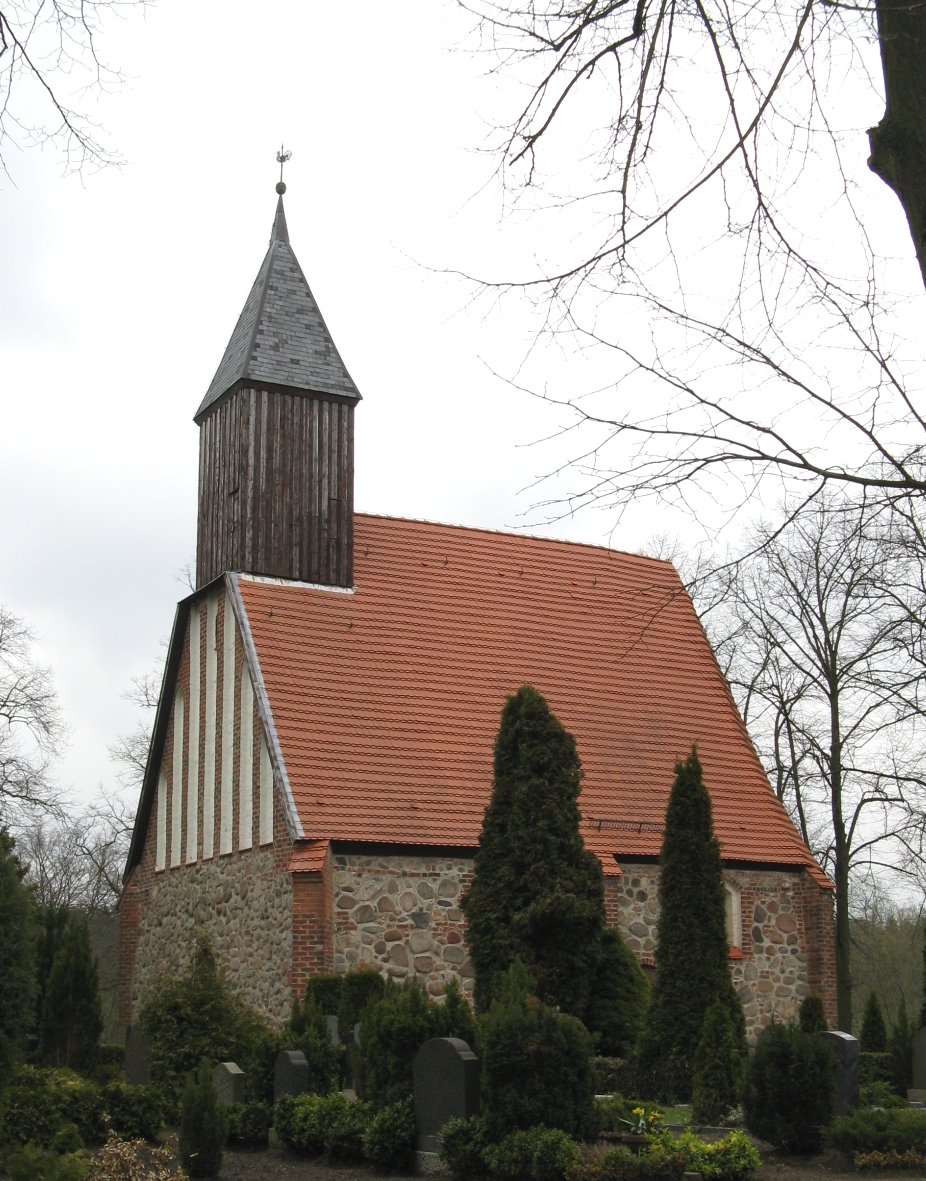
A Picture of the Village Church in Damm Parchim

Damm is a village and former municipality in the Ludwigslust-Parchim district, in Mecklenburg-Vorpommern, Germany. Since 25 May 2014, it is part of the town Parchim.
