= Vandover and the Brute =

1914 novel by Frank Norris

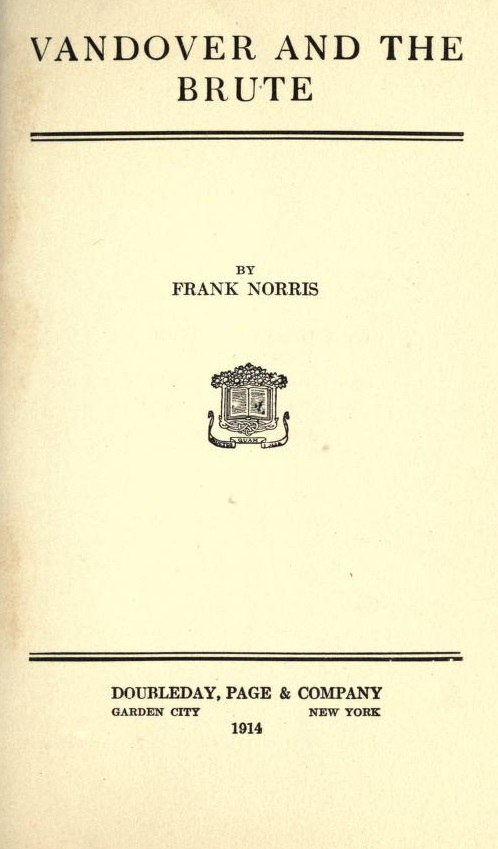
- Title page of the first edition.
- Author: Frank Norris
- Language: English
- Genre: Novel
- Publisher: Doubleday, Page & Company
- Publication date: 1914
- Publication place: United States

Vandover and the Brute is a novel by Frank Norris, written in 1894–95 and first published in 1914.

The novel is primarily set in San Francisco in the 1890s. (Several of the characters bear surnames identical to street names in that city: Geary, Haight, Ellis.) It is a work of American naturalist fiction, depicting the rapid decline and dissolution of a once-promising young painter, as the eponymous brute within gains the upper hand.
