= Damnation/Salvation =

Studio album by Eva O
- Released: 2005
- Recorded: 2005
- Genre: Deathrock; Gothic rock
- Label: Dark Dimensions, Alice In...

Eva O chronology
Damnation (Ride the Madness) (1999)	Damnation/Salvation (2005)

Damnation/Salvation is the 2005 studio solo album of the American deathrock veteran musician Eva O, released on the Dark Dimensions and Alice In... labels.

== Overview ==
Damnation/Salvation is the second part of the Damnation installment that deals with Eva O's personal past in the occult world. The first part of the album contains a few re-recorded and re-written versions of the previous Damnation (Ride the Madness) album songs, and the rest are new songs. Among the performers on it are Josh Pyle (keyboards/programming), River Tunnell (bass), and Kristian Rosentrater (drums), all members of the industrial band Audio Paradox. Damnation/Salvation is a detailed chronicle of her involvement with the occult and Satanism, and has been repeatedly turned down for distribution in the United States due to its subject matter. The Salvation (Are You Ready to Die?) part offers a more positive take on Eva's personal views compared to the Damnation (Ride the Madness) part.

Musically, the album takes its direction more towards Eva's previous band Shadow Project's metallic deathrock punk style, similar in songs such as "Eye to Eye". The riffs are heavy and doomy in a Black Sabbath fashion, and the songstructures are unconventional, long and progressive, lacking typical verse-chorus-verse structure or rhyming. Eva's vocal performance has been compared to that of a "swamp-blues opera diva". The album gets progressively heavier by the end. The album received good reviews from the press.

== Track listing ==
All songs written by Eva O, except where stated otherwise

1. "Damnation" - 7:22 (Eva O / Josh Pyle)
2. "One By One" - 1:33 (Eva O / Josh Pyle)
3. "Blood Lust" - 6:25 (Eva O /Josh Pyle)
4. "Ride the Madness" - 6:11
5. "Beauty of Hell" - 2:56
6. "Devil" - 3:15
7. "Are You Ready To Die" - 9:45
8. "Eye To Eye" - 9:20
9. "Who Is Your Father - Do You Hear Me" - 6:36
10. "Harlots Tears" - 4:27
11. "Not Seen" - 3:20
12. "Rumors of War" - 6:20
13. "Revelation" - 3:36 (Eva O / Josh Pyle)

== Line up ==
- Eva O: Vocals, guitars
- Edward J. Rodriguez: Rhythm guitar
- Steven Nikolaus: Bass
- Stevyn Grey: Drums
- Josh Pyle: Keyboards, samples, programming
