= Damm (surname) =

Damm is a surname. Notable people with the surname include:

- Arvid Damm (1869–1928), Swedish engineer and inventor
- Carl Damm (1927–1993), German politician
- Jürgen Damm (born 1992), Mexican professional footballer
- Martin Damm Sr. (born 1972), Czech tennis player, father of Martin Damm Jr.
- Martin Damm Jr. (born 2003), American tennis player, son of Martin Damm Sr.
- Rodrigo Damm (born 1980), Brazilian mixed martial artist
- Tobias Damm (born 1983), German footballer
- Ulrik Damm, Danish curler and coach
