= House of the Damned =

House of the Damned may refer to:

- House of the Damned (1963 film), an American horror film
- House of the Damned (1974 film), a Spanish film starring Carmen Sevilla
- House of the Damned (1996 film), an American zombie horror comedy film
- House of the Damned (1999 film), a film starring Chapman To
- House of the Damned, alternate title for Don't Look in the Attic (1981), an Italian horror film
- House of the Damned, alternate title for Spectre (1996 film), an American-Irish horror film
