= Kasethan Kadavulada (disambiguation) =

Kasethan Kadavulada (transl. Only money is god) is a 1972 Indian Tamil-language film.

It may also refer to:

- Kasethan Kadavulada (2011 film)
- Kasethan Kadavulada (2023 film)
