= Damn (disambiguation) =

Damn may refer to damnation or:

== Music ==
- Damn (band), a funk-rock and Latin band

=== Albums ===
- Damn! (Jimmy Smith album), 1995
- Damn, by Emperor Penguin, 2001
- Damn (album), by Kendrick Lamar, 2017

=== Songs ===
- "Damn" (Joyryde song), by Joyryde featuring Freddie Gibbs, 2016
- "Damn!" (song), by YoungBloodZ, 2003
- "Damn (Should've Treated U Right)", by So Plush featuring Ja Rule, 1999
- "Damn", by 112 from Pleasure & Pain
- "Damn", by Aldous Harding from Designer
- "Damn", by Fabolous from Street Dreams
- "Damn", by Girls Aloud from Tangled Up
- "Damn", by Jake Owen from Greetings from... Jake
- "Damn", by K. Michelle from Rebellious Soul
- "Damn", by Kanye West from Bully
- "Damn", by LeAnn Rimes from Twisted Angel
- "Damn", by Matchbox Twenty from Yourself or Someone Like You
- "Damn", by Shawnna from Block Music
- "Damn", by The Matrix, featuring Katy Perry, from The Matrix

== Science and technology ==
- Distributed architecture for mobile navigation, a mobile robot architecture
- dAmn, a chat client for the online community DeviantArt
- Diaminomaleonitrile, an organic compound

== See also ==
- Dam (disambiguation)
- Dammit (disambiguation)
- Damned (disambiguation)
- Damnation (disambiguation)
