= Frank Norris =

American journalist and novelist (1870–1902)

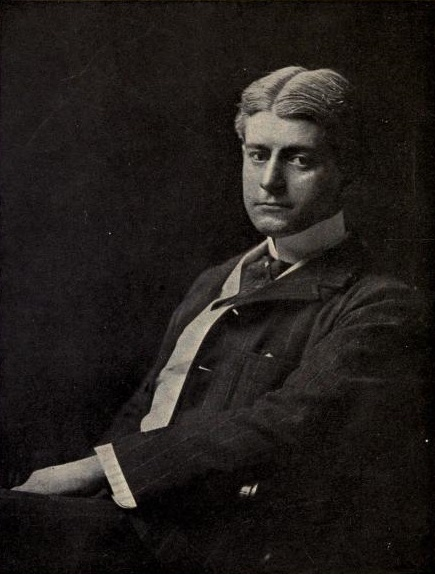
- Portrait of Norris, by Arnold Genthe
- Born: Benjamin Franklin Norris Jr. March 5, 1870; Chicago, Illinois, U.S.
- Died: October 25, 1902 (aged 32); San Francisco, California, U.S.
- Education: University of California, Berkeley
- Occupation: Writer
- Spouse: Jeannette Black
- Children: Jeannette Williamson Norris
- Writing career
- Pen name: Justin Sturgis
- Notable works: McTeague: A Story of San Francisco, The Octopus: A Story of California

Signature
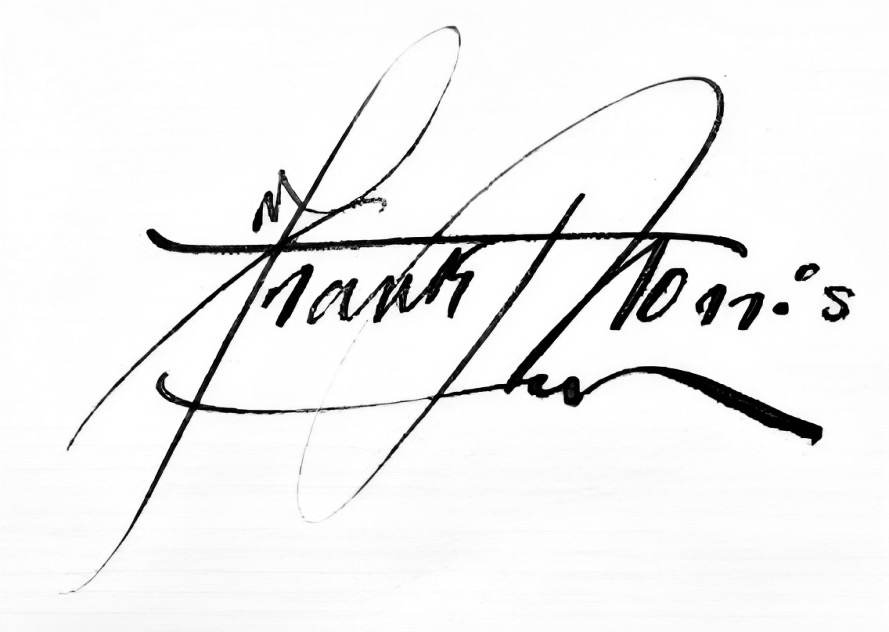

Benjamin Franklin Norris Jr. (March 5, 1870 – October 25, 1902) was an American journalist and novelist during the Progressive Era, whose fiction was predominantly in the naturalist genre. His notable works include McTeague: A Story of San Francisco (1899), The Octopus: A Story of California (1901) and The Pit (1903).

== Life ==
Norris was born in Chicago, Illinois, in 1870. His father, Benjamin, was a self-made Chicago businessman and his mother, Gertrude Glorvina Doggett, had a stage career. In 1884 the family moved to San Francisco where Benjamin went into real estate. In 1887, after the death of his brother and a brief stay in London, young Norris went to Académie Julian in Paris where he studied painting for two years and was exposed to the naturalist novels of Émile Zola. Between 1890 and 1894 he attended the University of California, Berkeley, where he became acquainted with the ideas of human evolution of Darwin and Spencer that are reflected in his later writings. His stories appeared in the undergraduate magazine at Berkeley and in the San Francisco Wave. After his parents' divorce he went east and spent a year in the English Department of Harvard University. There he met Lewis E. Gates, who encouraged his writing. He worked as a news correspondent in South Africa (1895–96) for the San Francisco Chronicle, and then as editorial assistant for the San Francisco Wave (1896–97). He worked for McClure's Magazine as a war correspondent in Cuba during the Spanish–American War in 1898. He joined the New York City publishing firm of Doubleday & Page in 1899.

During his time at the University of California, Berkeley, Norris was a brother in the Fraternity of Phi Gamma Delta and was an originator of the Skull & Keys society. Because of his involvement with a prank during the Class Day Exercises in 1893, the annual alumni dinner held by each Phi Gamma Delta chapter still bears his name. In 1900 Frank Norris married Jeannette Black. They had a child in 1902.

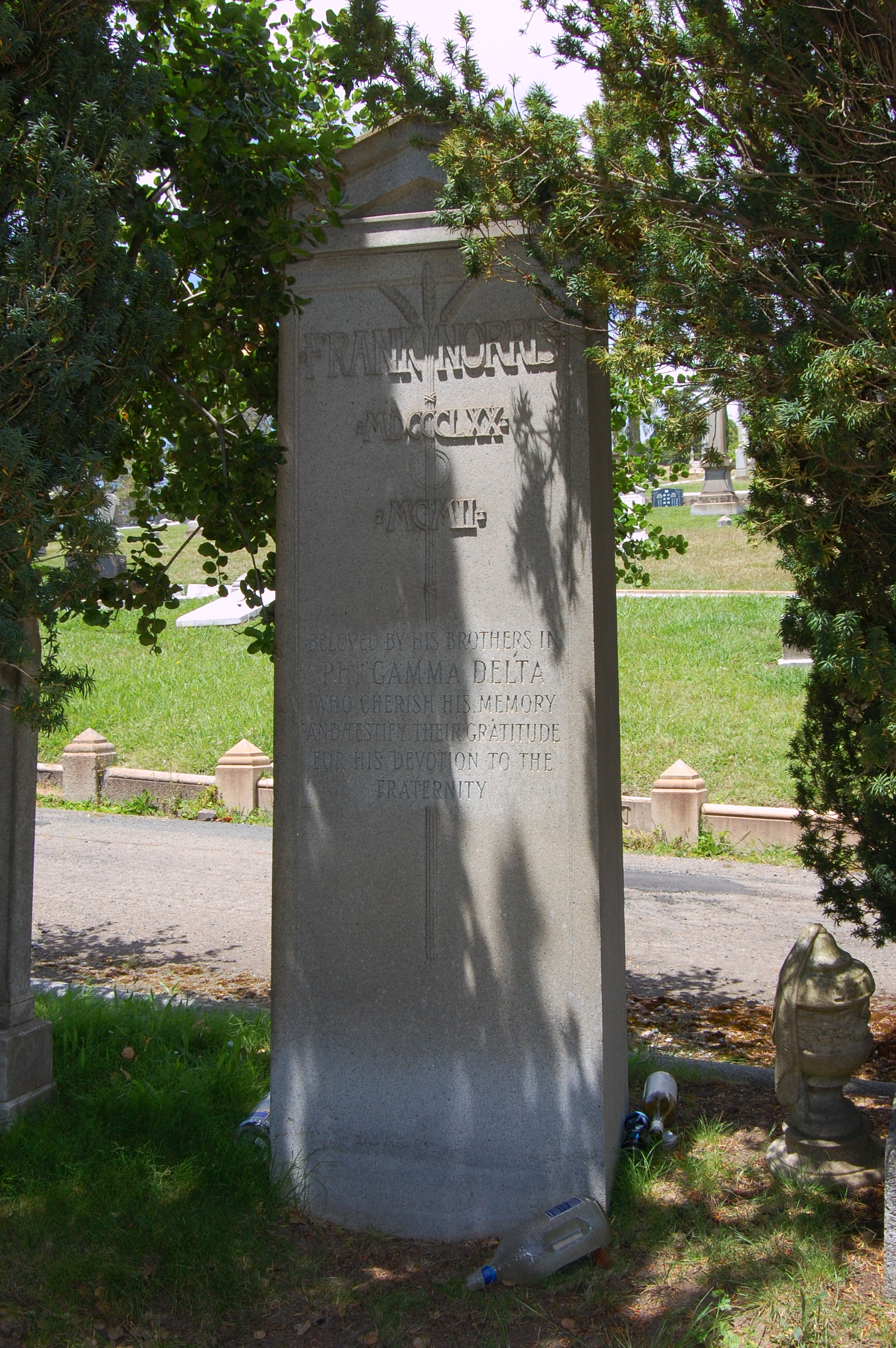
Grave

Norris died in San Francisco on October 25, 1902, of peritonitis from a ruptured appendix. This left The Epic of the Wheat trilogy unfinished. He was 32. He is buried in Mountain View Cemetery in Oakland, California.

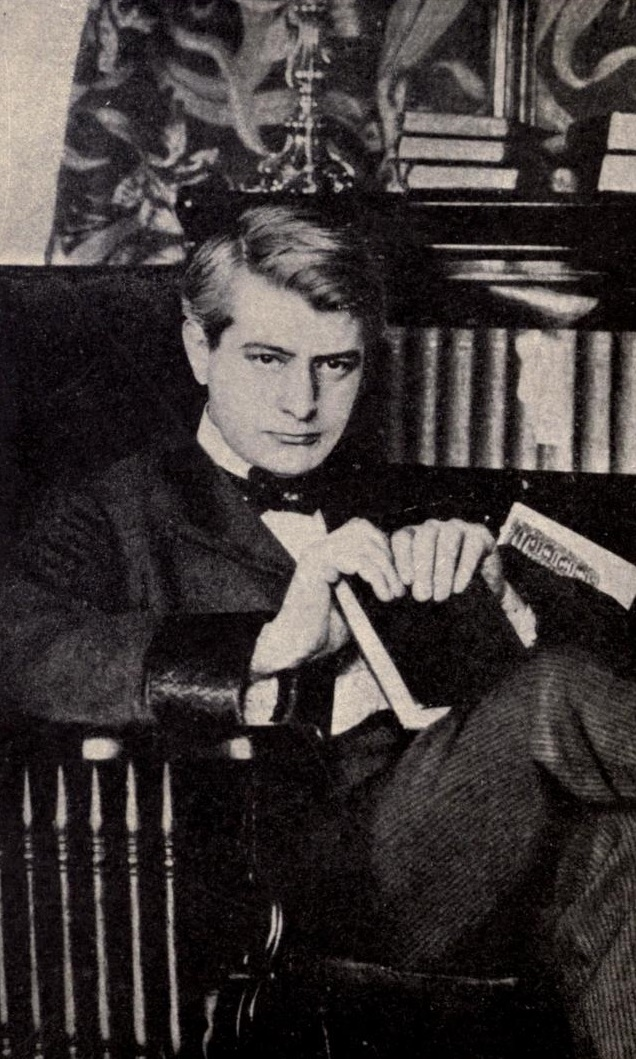
Frank Norris

Charles Gilman Norris, the author's younger brother, became a well regarded novelist and editor. C. G. Norris was also the husband of the prolific novelist Kathleen Norris. The Bancroft Library of the University of California, Berkeley, houses the archives of all three writers.

== Career ==
Frank Norris's work often includes depictions of suffering caused by corrupt and greedy turn-of-the-century corporate monopolies. In his most influential novel,The Octopus: A California Story, the Pacific and Southwest Railroad is implicated in the suffering and deaths of a number of ranchers in Southern California.

At the end of the novel, after a bloody shootout between farmers and railroad agents at one of the ranches (named Los Muertos), readers are encouraged to take a "larger view" that sees that "through the welter of blood at the irrigating ditch ... the great harvest of Los Muertos rolled like a flood from the Sierras to the Himalayas to feed thousands of starving scarecrows on the barren plains of India". Though free-wheeling market capitalism causes the deaths of many of the characters in the novel, this "larger view always ... discovers the Truth that will, in the end, prevail, and all things, surely, inevitably, resistlessly work together for good".

The novel Vandover and the Brute, written in the 1890s, but not published until after his death, is about three college friends preparing to become successful, and the ruin of one due to a degenerate lifestyle.

In addition to Zola's, Norris's writing has been compared to that of Stephen Crane, Theodore Dreiser, and Edith Wharton.

== Critical reception ==
Although some of his novels remain highly admired, aspects of Norris's work have not fared well with literary critics in the late 20th and early 21st century. As Donald Pizer writes "Frank Norris's racism, which included the most vicious anti-Semitic portrayals in any major work of American literature, has long been an embarrassment to admirers of the vigor and intensity of his best fiction and has also contributed to the decline of his reputation during the past several generations." Other scholars have confirmed Norris's antisemitism. Norris's work is often seen as strongly influenced by the scientific racism of the late 19th century, such as that espoused by his professor at the University of California, Berkeley, Joseph LeConte. Along with his contemporary Jack London, Norris is seen as "reconstructing American identity as a biological category of Anglo-Saxon masculinity." In Norris's work, critics have seen evidence of racism, antisemitism, and contempt for immigrants and the working poor, all of whom are seen as the losers in a Social-Darwinist struggle for existence.

== Legacy ==
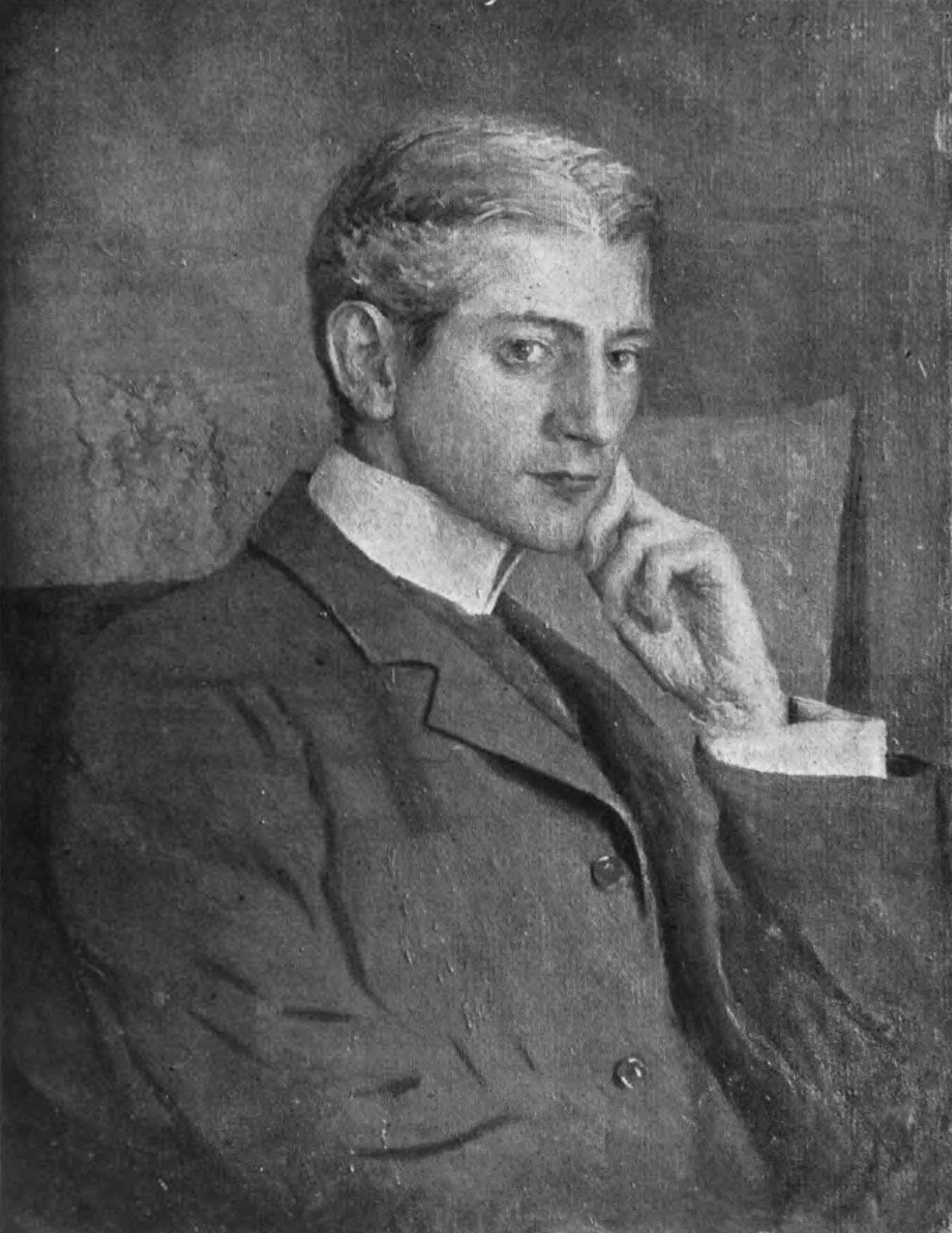
Portrait of Norris, by Ernest Peixotto

- Norris's novel The Pit was adapted for the theater by Channing Pollock in four acts. Produced by William A. Brady, the play premiered at New York's Lyric Theatre on February 10, 1904. A film adaptation of The Pit was produced in 1917, by William A. Brady's Picture Plays Inc.
- Norris's short story "A Deal in Wheat" (1903) and the novel The Pit were the basis for the 1909 D.W. Griffith film A Corner in Wheat.
- Norris's Moran of the Lady Letty was adapted by Monte M. Katterjohn in 1922. Directed by George Melford, the film starred Rudolph Valentino and Dorothy Dalton.
- Norris's McTeague has been filmed twice. The best known version is the 1924 film entitled Greed directed by Erich von Stroheim. An earlier adaptation, Life's Whirlpool, was produced in 1915 by the World Film Corporation, starring Fania Marinoff and Holbrook Blinn.
- In 1962 the Frank Norris Cabin was designated a National Historic Landmark.
- An opera by William Bolcom, based loosely on his 1899 novel, McTeague, was premiered by Chicago's Lyric Opera in 1992. The work is in two acts, with libretto by Arnold Weinstein and Robert Altman. The Lyric Opera's presentation featured Ben Heppner in the title role and Catherine Malfitano as Trina, the dentist's wife.
- In 2008, the Library of America selected Norris's newspaper article "Hunting Human Game" for inclusion in its two-century retrospective of American True Crime.
- An alley-way in San Francisco is named for him (Frank Norris Place). It runs from Polk St. to Larkin St. and is located parallel to and in between Pine St. and Bush St. in the city's Lower Nob Hill district.
- A tavern on San Francisco's Polk Street, near Frank Norris Place, is named McTeague's Saloon in honor of Norris's novel McTeague (1899). The interior and exterior are decorated with objects and imagery associated with the novel.
- The popular writing quip, "I hate writing, but love having written" is credited to a letter of writing advice written by Norris, published posthumously in 1915.

== Works ==
Fiction

- (1892). Yvernelle. Philadelphia: J.B. Lippincott Company.
- (1898). Moran of the "Lady Letty": A Story of Adventure Off the California Coast. New York: Doubleday & McClure Co.
- (1899). McTeague: A Story of San Francisco. New York: Doubleday & McClure Co.
- (1899). Blix. New York: Doubleday & McClure Co.
- (1900). A Man's Woman. New York: Doubleday & McClure Co.
- (1901). The Octopus: A Story of California. New York: Doubleday, Page & Co.
- (1903). The Pit: A Story of Chicago. New York: Doubleday, Page & Co.
- (1903). A Deal in Wheat and Other Stories of the New and Old West. New York: Doubleday, Page & Company.
- (1909). The Third Circle. New York: John Lane Company.
- (1914). Vandover and the Brute. New York: Doubleday, Page & Company.
- (1931). Frank Norris of "The Wave." Stories & Sketches From the San Francisco Weekly, 1893 to 1897. San Francisco: The Westgate Press.
- (1998). The Best Short Stories of Frank Norris. New York: Ironweed Press Inc.

Short Stories

- (1906). The Joyous Miracle. New York: Doubleday, Page & Company.
- (1907). "A Lost Story." In: The Spinners' Book of Fiction. San Francisco and New York: Paul Elder and Company.
- (1909). "The Passing of Cock-Eye Blacklock." In: California Story Book. San Francisco: Pub. by the English Club of the University of California.
- (1910). "San Francisco's Old Chinatown." In: Pathway to Western Literature. Stockton, Cal.: Nettie E. Gaines.

Non-fiction

- (1898). The Surrender of Santiago. Unknown
- (1903). The Responsibilities of the Novelist. New York: Doubleday, Page & Company.
- (1986). Frank Norris: Collected Letters. San Francisco: The Book Club of California.
- (1996). The Apprenticeship Writings of Frank Norris 1896–1898. Philadelphia: American Philosophical Society.

Selected articles

- "The True Reward of the Novelist," The World's Work, Vol. II, May/October 1901.
- "Mr. Kipling's Kim," The World's Work, Vol. II, May/October 1901 (unsigned)
- "The Need of a Literary Conscience," The World's Work, Vol. III, November 1901/April 1902.
- "The Frontier Gone at Last," The World's Work, Vol. III, November 1901/April 1902.
- "The Novel with a 'Purpose'," The World's Work, Vol. IV, May/October 1902.
- "A Neglected Epic," The World's Work, Vol. V, November 1902/April 1903.

Translations

- "Fifi," by Léon Faran, The Wave, Vol. XVI, No. 4, January 23, 1897.
- "Not Guilty," by Marcel l'Heureux, The Wave, Vol. XVI, No. 25, June 19, 1897.
- "Story of a Wall," by Pierre Loti, The Wave, Vol. XVI, No. 35, August 28, 1897.
- "An Elopement," by Ferdinand Bloch, The Wave, Vol. XVI, No. 52, December 25, 1897.

Collected works

- The Complete Works of Frank Norris. New York: P.F. Collier Sons Publishers, 1898–1903 (4 Vols.)
- Complete Works of Frank Norris. New York: Doubleday, Page & Company, 1903 (7 Vols.)
- The Collected Works of Frank Norris. New York: Doubleday, Doran & Company, Inc., 1928 (10 Vols.)
- Norris: Novels and Essays. New York: Library of America, 1986.
- A Novelist in the Making: A Collection of Student Themes, and the Novels Blix and Vandover and the Brute. Harvard University Press, 1970
