= Dam, Bhutan =

Dam
- Location in Bhutan
- Coordinates: 27°7′N 89°46′E
- Country: Bhutan
- District: Dagana District
- Time zone: UTC+6 (BTT)

Dam is a town in Dagana District in southwestern Bhutan.
