= Damned (band) =

Japanese band

- Origin: Tokyo, Japan
- Genres: Metalcore; deathcore
- Years active: 2022–present
- Members: Hitone; Kou; Suica; Sakura; Masaya
- Past members: You; Keigo
- Website: damned.ryzm.jp

Damned (stylized in all caps as DAMNED) is a Japanese metalcore visual kei band. It was formed in 2022 by Keigo, Kou, Sakura, You, and Masaya, following the end of the session band Veltro. In 2023, Keigo and You left the group and were replaced by Hitone and Suica. Damned gained some popularity outside of Japan, announcing a European tour just three years after their formation.

== Career ==
=== Veltro ===
Sakura and Kou, former members of the band Dobe, formed the temporary group Veltro in March 2022. To complete the lineup, they were joined by vocalist Keigo, guitarist You, and drummer Masaya. The group released the single "Revenir" in May and "Grimnir" in August. According to the band members themselves, since the group included musicians who were relatively new to the visual kei scene, this was considered a "training period".

=== Damned ===
On September 16, 2022, the group officially debuted as Damned. They released the single "Veltro" — named in honor of their former band — on November 2, following the release of its music video in October. On November 25, it was followed by "hydrangea." Maintaining this design style, they release "jamming." in January and "room." in February. In April 2023, Damned invited fans to choose which demos would be remixed and released as singles. From April 1 to 4, they released four demos on their YouTube channel and held a vote on Twitter from April 5 to 12. The tracks were "Dazzle", "The Journey in Your Dreams", "Shadows of a bygone era not yet seen" and "SLEEPLESS". Following that, they released the music video for their new single, "Fla:ill," on May 23.

Before the song was released as single, member You announced his departure, playing a last show on June 28. Days earlier, the band had released "Refrain" on Bandcamp. Suica, also a former member of Dobe, filled the gap as support guitarist. In October, they released the digital single "Souen". In November, vocalist Keigo also left the band, but Damned expressed their desire to move forward, and the shows scheduled through December went ahead with a guest vocalist. In January 2024, Hitone became the new vocalist and Suica became the official guitarist, debuting the new lineup with the single "Anemone". In April, they released "Utsuro", followed by "-STAIN-" in September. On May 18, they performed at the Kansai Rock Summit festival in Osaka, and at the end of September, they held a concert to celebrate their two-year anniversary in Ikebukuro. On October 5, the band performed at the Mad Pit Fes, hosted by Jiluka. In November, they released "Doku ai" with lyrics translated into English, targeting an international audience. A national tour, named Pentagram, took place from December 3 to January 31, 2025, with performances in Tokyo, Nagoya, Osaka, Fukuoka, and Sapporo. During this period, they also opened an account on Instagram.

On January 31, 2025, they released the music video for "Suikyou to Majiwaru Kyouhakuteki Kachikan" (酔狂と交わる強迫的価値観), single released in February. The video caused some stir for showing Hitone eating a live moth, something similar to the music video for "-STAIN-," in which he eats a grasshopper. The "Gargantua" tour kicked off in July, covering the same cities as Pentagram, and wrapped up in Shibuya on September 22, the band's third anniversary. Damned played a sold-out show in South Korea with Madmans Esprit in April, marking their first international performance. In May, they announced a European tour titled Jukai which visited six countries, beginning in Germany on November 26 and ending in the United Kingdom on December 7, with stops in Slovakia, Spain, Poland, and Finland. In September, they had released the singles "Daedra" and a collaboration with Cazqui (ex Nocturnal Bloodlust), "Shoku".

In November 2026, they will continue their international expansion with a tour on Latin America, performing in Brazil, Argentina, Chile, and Mexico.

== Musical style ==
The band describes itself as visual kei loudcore. According to JRock News, the single "Veltro" features "powerful rhythmic chords", guttural vocals, and headbanging moments. Regarding the music production process, they explained in 2023 that Kou and You would create the demos, while the band would collectively arrange and rehearse them. Once they had achieved a certain level of success in the creative process, the songs would then be recorded and finalized. Visually, the group embraces a dark and dramatic aesthetic.

The members of the original lineup cited Japanese artists such as The Gazette, Nocturnal Bloodlust, Dir en grey, Nightmare, Luna Sea, Mucc, hide, and international ones such as Motionless in White, Falling in Reverse, Suicide Silence e Chelsea Grin as influences.

== Members ==
- Hitone – vocals (2023–present)
- Kou – guitar (2022–present)
- Suica – guitar (2023–present)
- Sakura – bass (2022–present)
- Masaya – drums (2022–present)

Former members

- You – guitar (2022–2023)
- Keigo – vocals (2022–2023)

== Discography ==
=== Singles ===
- "Veltro" (2022)
- "hydrangea." (2022)
- "jamming." (2023)
- "room." (2023)
- "Fla:ill" (2023)
- "REFRAIN" (2023)
- "DAZZLE" (2023)
- "Souen" (蒼炎, 2023)
- "Anemone" (2024)
- "Thanatosis" (2024)
- "Utsuro" (虚, 2024)
- "Doku ai" (毒愛, 2024)
- "-Stain-" (2024)
- "ArtrA" (ArtrA-アルトラ-, 2024)
- "Suikyou to majiwaru kyouhaku teki kachikan" (酔狂と交わる強迫的価値観, 2025)
- "Reimei" (黎明, 2025)
- "DAEDRA" (2025)
- "ShoKu" (feat. Cazqui) (-蝕-, 2025)
- "ANHEDONIA" (2026)
- "Yuragu" (揺らぐ, 2026)
- "Mekure" (めくれ, 2026)

=== As Veltro ===
- "Revenir" (2022)
- "Grimnir" (2022)
