= Dam (disambiguation) =

A dam is a barrier obstructing flowing water.

Dam may also refer to:

== Places ==
- Dam, Bhutan
- Dam, Gennep, in the Dutch municipality of Gennep
- Dam, Hollands Kroon, in the Dutch municipality of Hollands Kroon
- Dam Square, Amsterdam
- Den Dam, in northern Antwerp, Belgium

== Abbreviations and acronyms ==
- Database activity monitoring
- Decametre
- Denver Art Museum
- Digital asset management
- Direct Action Movement of the Solidarity Federation

== Transport ==
- Dalmeny railway station's station code
- Damascus International Airport's IATA code

== Other uses ==
- Dam (agricultural reservoir)
- DAM (band), a Palestinian rap group
- Dam (cooking), South Asian cooking in a dough-sealed pot
- Dam (Indian coin)
- Nepalese dam
- Dam (methylase), DNA adenine methylase
- Dam (surname), a surname
- Dams (surname), a surname
- Dental dam
- WCMG, a South Carolina, US radio station once called "94.3 The Dam"
- Dam, an archaic form of address for a woman, equivalent to sire for a man
- Dam, female role in the Dominican bélé dance
- Dam, the female parent of a horse, a term used in horse breeding
- Dam (blood), one of the Ten Plagues of Egypt
- "Dam" (Space Ghost Coast to Coast), a television episode
- Dam (TV series), a South African psychological thriller television series
- "Dam" (song), a song by SB19
- The Dam, a 1913 painting by Dominique Lang
- The Dam, a 1981 novel by Robert Byrne

== People ==
- Atli Dam (1932–2005), Prime Minister of the Faroe Islands
- Henrik Dam (1895–1976), Danish biochemist
- Jan Dam (footballer) (born 1968), Faroese footballer
- Jan Dam (boxer) (1905–1985), Belgian boxer
- José van Dam (born 1940), Belgian bass-baritone
- Kenneth W. Dam (1932–2022), American lawyer and politician
- Kurtis Dam (born 1985), Swiss-American drag queen
- Laurens ten Dam (born 1980), Dutch cycle racer
- Peter Mohr Dam (1898–1968), Prime Minister of the Faroe Islands
- Rigmor Dam (born 1971), Faroese politician
- Rob Van Dam (born 1970), American actor
- Thomas Dam (1909–1986), inventor of the troll doll
- Đàm Thanh Xuân (born 1985), Vietnamese swimmer and martial artist

== See also ==
- Avalanche dam
- Landslide dam
- Volcanic dam
- Damn (disambiguation)
- Dum (disambiguation)
